= 2022 Canadian federal electoral redistribution =

Redistribution of Canadian electoral ridings

A redistribution of federal electoral districts ("ridings") began in Canada following the results of the 2021 Canadian census. The Constitution of Canada requires that federal electoral districts that compose the House of Commons undergo a redistribution of boundaries following each decennial Canadian census. The redistribution process began in October 2021; it was completed in October 2023. It is based on data obtained during the 2021 Canadian census. It is also based on the practice of giving each district only one member, which has been in effect since the 1968 election.

The changes to the federal electoral district boundaries took effect for the 2025 Canadian federal election, which was the first general election called after April 22, 2024. If the election had been called before this date, that election would have used the existing electoral district boundaries, which had been in effect since the 2015 federal election was called on August 4, 2015.

The redistribution formula for federal electoral districts is set out in Section 51 of the Constitution Act, 1867. The formula in Section 51 was amended to its current form in 2022 by the Preserving Provincial Representation in the House of Commons Act. Section 52 permits additional seats to be added to the House of Commons provided proportionate representation between the provinces is maintained.

Under the Electoral Boundaries Readjustment Act, to redistribute the electoral boundaries within each province, ten independent electoral boundary commissions will be established, one for each province. The commissions are composed of three members, one appointed by the chief justice of each province, and two members appointed by the speaker of the House of Commons. Nunavut, the Northwest Territories and Yukon do not require commissions as each territory is allotted only a single member in the House of Commons, resulting in the entirety of each territory being a single electoral district.

== Allocation of seats ==
=== Initial proposal ===
The initial allocation of seats to the provinces and territories was based on rules in the Constitution of Canada established in 2012 by the Fair Representation Act, as well as estimates of the Canadian population on July 1, 2021, made by Statistics Canada. The chief electoral officer announced the allocation of seats on October 15, 2021.

Allocation of seats in the House of Commons under the Fair Representation Act
Province or territory	2012 redistribution	Initial 2022 seat allocation	Change
Ontario	121	122	1 ▲
Quebec	78	77	1 ▼
British Columbia	42	43	1 ▲
Alberta	34	37	3 ▲
Manitoba	14	14	Steady
Saskatchewan	14	14	Steady
Nova Scotia	11	11	Steady
New Brunswick	10	10	Steady
Newfoundland and Labrador	7	7	Steady
Prince Edward Island	4	4	Steady
Northwest Territories	1	1	Steady
Nunavut	1	1	Steady
Yukon	1	1	Steady
Canada	338	342	4 ▲

=== Final apportionment ===
Notwithstanding the chief electoral officer's announcement, Parliament retained certain powers to amend the Constitution Act, 1867 and thus the redistricting process. Such a change occurred during the 2012 redistribution. Amendments affecting proportionate representation between the provinces, however, required support of seven provinces representing at least 50 percent of the population of Canada.

Several days after the chief electoral officer's announcement of the allocation, Quebec provincial minister of justice Sonia LeBel said that Quebec's "special status" as Canada's "only francophone province" meant that the province must not lose any seats. LeBel said the province represents one of the "founding peoples of Canada", saying that represents much more than "a simple calculation of population". In November 2021, both the Premier of Quebec François Legault and the opposition Bloc Québécois (BQ) also called for Quebec to maintain its current number of seats of 78.

The same month, The Toronto Star editorial board called for further seats to be added in Ontario, British Columbia and Alberta, to provide fair representation for voters in those provinces. It also said calls to institute a minimum threshold of seats for Quebec should be rejected. The Globe and Mail's editorial board also called on Parliament to add additional seats to ensure the principle of "one person, one vote" would be realized.

On February 8, 2022, BQ shadow minister Martin Champoux introduced a private member's bill entitled An Act to amend the Constitution Act, 1867 (representation in the House of Commons). The bill proposed that Quebec would be guaranteed never to be allotted less than 25% of the seats in the House. This had previously been a provision in the failed 1992 Charlottetown Accord. The bill was defeated at second reading on June 8, 2022, by a vote of 51 to 264, with the BQ and New Democratic Party (NDP) voting for the bill, and the Liberals and Conservatives voting against it.

On March 2, 2022, the House of Commons called for the rules for apportioning seats to be amended in a non-binding motion. The motion was introduced by the Bloc to avoid Quebec losing a seat in the House of Commons. Following the vote, the government announced it would reject any scenario where Quebec loses a seat and would be working on a way to ensure the existing number of Quebec seats would be maintained. Following the announcement, Conservative MP Michelle Rempel Garner said that the decision could contribute to western alienation and raised new questions about Canada's electoral system. She said Conservatives should consider advocating for the adoption of proportional representation.

On March 24, 2022, the government tabled legislation to prevent Quebec (or any other province) from losing any seats relative to the number of seats it was apportioned in 2012 Canadian federal electoral redistribution. Bill C-14 amended Rule 2 of subsection 51(1) of the Constitution Act, 1867, commonly known as the "grandfather clause". The Bill passed the House of Commons on June 15, 2022, passed the Senate on June 21, 2022, and received royal assent on June 23, 2022.

The chief electoral officer announced the new allocation of seats under the Preserving Provincial Representation in the House of Commons Act on July 8, 2022.

Allocation of seats in the House of Commons under the Preserving Provincial Representation in the House of Commons Act
Province or territory	2012 redistribution	2022 seat allocation	Average population per electoral district	Change
Ontario	121	122	116,590	1 ▲
Quebec	78	78	108,998	Steady
British Columbia	42	43	116,300	1 ▲
Alberta	34	37	115,206	3 ▲
Manitoba	14	14	95,868	Steady
Saskatchewan	14	14	80,893	Steady
Nova Scotia	11	11	88,126	Steady
New Brunswick	10	10	77,561	Steady
Newfoundland and Labrador	7	7	72,935	Steady
Prince Edward Island	4	4	38,583	Steady
Northwest Territories	1	1	41,070	Steady
Nunavut	1	1	36,858	Steady
Yukon	1	1	40,232	Steady
Canada	338	343	107,848	5 ▲

==== Transposed 2021 results ====
2021 results transposed onto 2023 boundaries
Party	MPs		
Party	2021 actual result	2021 notional result	Change
Liberal	160	157	▼3
Conservative	119	126	▲7
Bloc Québécois	32	34	▲2
New Democratic	25	24	▼1
Green	2	2	Steady
Total seats	338	343	5 ▲

== Initial proposals ==
=== Alberta ===
On June 10, 2022, the Federal Electoral Boundaries Commission for Alberta released their initial proposal, proposing the following ridings:

- Airdrie—Chestermere: new district, takes in the Airdrie area from Banff—Airdrie and the Chestermere area from Bow River
- Battle River—Crowfoot: expanded to take in the Alberta side of Lloydminster, Vegreville, portions of Beaver County and Minburn County from Lakeland; loses much of its area to Bow River
- Bow River: expanded to include the town of Bowden, village of Elnora, and portions of Red Deer County and Mountain View County from Red Deer—Mountain View: the M.D. of Acadia No. 34, Starland County, Special Area No. 2 and No. 3, portions of Stettler County from Battle River—Crowfoot; portions of Cypress County including CFB Suffield from Medicine Hat—Cardston—Warner; portions of Lethbridge County from Lethbridge;
- Calgary Centre
- Calgary Confederation
- Calgary Crowchild: largely replaces Calgary Rocky Ridge
- Calgary Forest Lawn
- Calgary Heritage
- Calgary McKnight: new district, takes in the Calgary neighbourhoods of Sadle Ridge, Martindale, Taradale, Castleridge, Falconridge, Whitehorn and Temple from Calgary Skyview and the neighbourhoods of Coral Springs, Monterey Park, Rundle and Prineridge from Calgary Forest Lawn
- Calgary Midnapore
- Calgary Nose Hill
- Calgary Shepard
- Calgary Signal Hill
- Calgary Skyview
- Canmore—Cochrane—Olds: new district, takes in the Canmore and Cochrane areas from Banff—Airdrie plus the Olds area from Red Deer—Mountain View
- Edmonton Centre: expanded to take in the Edmonton neighbourhoods of Boyle Street, McCauley; portions of the neighbourhoods of Cromdale and Alberta Avenue from Edmonton Griesbach
- Edmonton Gateway: new district, takes in the Edmonton neighbourhoods of Tweddle Place, Richfield, Lee Ridge, Tipaskan, Kameyosek, Meyonohk, Ekota, Satoo and Menisa from Edmonton Mill Woods; the neighbourhoods of Steinhauer, Ermineskin, Keheewin, Bearspaw, Blackburn, Richford and the western half of Duggan from Edmonton Riverbend; and the neighbourhoods of Ellerslie, Summerside, the Orchards at Ellerslie, Rutherford, Blackbud Creek, Cavanagh, Callaghan and Allard from Edmonton—Wetaskiwin
- Edmonton Griesbach: expanded to take in the Edmonton neighbourhoods of Ozerna, Mayliewan, Belle Rive, Eaux Claires, Beaumaris, Lorelei, Klarvatten, and Lago Lindo from Edmonton Manning; the neighbourhoods of Canossa, Chambéry, Elsinore, and Baturyn from St. Albert—Edmonton
- Edmonton Manning: expanded to take in the Edmonton neighbourhoods of Bergman, Beacon Heights, Rundle Heights, and Abbottsfield from Edmonton Griesbach
- Edmonton Mill Woods: expanded to take in the Edmonton neighbourhood of Charlesworth, a portion of Walker, and southeast rural areas to city limits from Edmonton—Wetaskiwin
- Edmonton Riverbend: expanded to take in the Edmonton neighbourhoods of Glenridding Heights, Glenridding Ravine, Keswick, Hays Ridge, Graydon Hill, Paisley, Chappelle, Desrochers, and southwest rural areas to city limits from Edmonton—Wetaskiwin
- Edmonton Strathcona: expanded to take in the Edmonton neighbourhoods of Rideau Park, Royal Gardens, Aspen Gardens, and a portion of Duggan from Edmonton Riverbend
- Edmonton West: expanded to take in the Edmonton neighbourhood of Windermere from Edmonton Riverbend; the neighbourhoods of Patricia Heights, Rio Terrace, Quesnell Heights, Lynnwood, Jasper Park, Sherwood, Parkview, and Laurier Heights from Edmonton Centre
- Edmonton Winterburn: new district, takes in the Edmonton neighbourhoods of Mayfield, Britannia Youngstown, Glenwood, Terra Losa, La Perle, Belmead, Secord, Rosenthal, Stewart Greens, Webber Greens, Suder Greens, Breckenridge Greens, Potter Greens and Westview Village from Edmonton West; the neighbourhoods of Hawkes Ridge, Trumpeter, Starling, Albany, Rapperswill, Carlton, Oxford, Dunluce, Cumberland, Hudson, Baranow, Caernarvon, Pembina and Carlisle from St. Albert—Edmonton; and the neighbourhoods of Wellington, Athlone, Calder and Kensington from Edmonton Griesbach
- Foothills: expanded to take in the Blood 148 and 148A reserves from Medicine Hat—Cardston—Warner; the town of Vulcan and portions of Vulcan County from Bow River; and portions of Lethbridge County from Lethbridge
- Fort McMurray—Cold Lake
- Grande Prairie: largely replaces Grande Prairie—Mackenzie; loses Mackenzie County to Peace River—Westlock
- Lakeland: expanded to take in Fort Saskatchewan and portions of Strathcona County from Sherwood Park—Fort Saskatchewan; the towns of Redwater, Gibbons, portions of Sturgeon County from Sturgeon River—Parkland
- Lethbridge: loses a large portion of Lethbridge County to Bow River and Foothills
- Medicine Hat—Cardston—Warner: expanded to take in the town of Taber, village of Barnwell, and portions of the MD of Taber from Bow River
- Peace River—Westlock: expanded to take in Mackenzie County from Grande Prairie—Mackenzie; Birch Cove and portions of Lac Ste. Anne County from Sturgeon River—Parkland
- Red Deer: new district, unites all of Red Deer in one riding, plus some rural area south and southeast of the city
- Sherwood Park—Beaumont: new district, takes in Sherwood Park area from Sherwood Park—Fort Saskatchewan and the Beaumont area from Edmonton—Wetaskiwin
- Spruce Grove—Leduc: new district; takes in Spruce Grove area from Sturgeon River—Parkland and the Leduc area from Edmonton—Wetaskiwin
- Sturgeon River: new district; includes much of Sturgeon County and St. Albert
- Wetaskiwin—Lacombe: new district, takes in the Wetaskiwin area from Edmonton—Wetaskiwin and the Lacombe area from Red Deer—Lacombe
- Yellowhead: expanded to take in Banff National Park and the town of Banff from Banff—Airdrie; portions of Wetaskiwin County from Edmonton—Wetaskiwin; portions of Wetaskiwin County, Clearwater County and Ponoka County from Red Deer—Lacombe; and portions of Lac Ste. Anne County from Sturgeon River—Parkland

=== British Columbia ===
On May 2, 2022, the Federal Electoral Boundaries Commission for British Columbia released their initial proposal, proposing the following ridings:

- Abbotsford
- Burnaby North—Seymour
- Burnaby South
- Cariboo—Prince George
- Chilliwack: Replaces Chilliwack—Hope; loses Hope; gains some of the Sumas Prairie area of Abbotsford
- Cloverdale—Langley City
- Coquihalla: Replaces Central Okanagan—Similkameen—Nicola
- Coquitlam—Port Coquitlam
- Courtenay—Alberni
- Cowichan—Malahat—Langford: No boundary changes proposed
- Delta
- Esquimalt—Saanich—Sooke
- Fleetwood—Port Kells
- Kamloops—Thompson—Lytton: Replaces Kamloops—Thompson—Cariboo
- Kelowna: New district; contains Kelowna part of Central Okanagan—Similkameen—Nicola and southern and eastern parts of Kelowna—Lake Country
- Kootenay—Columbia
- Langley—Aldergrove
- Mission—Maple Ridge: New district; contains eastern half of Maple Ridge from Pitt Meadows—Maple Ridge; and Mission and Agassiz from Mission—Matsqui—Fraser Canyon
- Nanaimo—Ladysmith
- New Westminster—Bridgeview: Replaces New Westminster—Burnaby, and includes the Bridgeview neighbourhood of Surrey
- North Island—Powell River: Gains the eastern half of Courtenay from Courtenay—Alberni
- North Okanagan—Shuswap
- North Vancouver
- Pitt Meadows—Fort Langley: New district; contains Pitt Meadows and the western half of Maple Ridge from Pitt Meadows—Maple Ridge; Surrey Bend area from Fleetwood—Port Kells; and northern third of Langley Township from Langley—Aldergrove
- Port Moody—Coquitlam
- Prince George—Peace River—Northern Rockies: Gains area north of the Cariboo Highway and west of the Fraser River in Prince George from Cariboo—Prince George
- Richmond East: replaces Steveston—Richmond East; gains Queensborough from New Westminster—Burnaby; loses Steveston
- Richmond West: replaces Richmond Centre; gains Steveston from Steveston—Richmond East
- Saanich—Gulf Islands
- Skeena—Bulkley Valley: No boundary changes proposed
- South Okanagan—West Kootenay
- South Surrey—White Rock
- Surrey Centre
- Surrey West: Replaces Surrey—Newton
- Vancouver Centre
- Vancouver East
- Vancouver Granville
- Vancouver Kingsway
- Vancouver Quadra
- Vancouver South
- Vernon—Lake Country: New district; contains northern half of Kelowna and Lake Country, from Kelowna—Lake Country; and Vernon area from North Okanagan—Shuswap
- Victoria: No boundary changes proposed
- West Vancouver—Sunshine Coast—Sea to Sky Country

=== Manitoba ===
On June 16, 2022, the Federal Electoral Boundaries Commission for Manitoba released their initial proposal, proposing the following ridings:

- Brandon—Souris: Loses Virden and the former Rural Municipality of Wallace and gains the CFB Shilo area from Dauphin—Swan River—Neepawa; gains the Municipality of Lorne, the Municipality of Pembina and Swan Lake 7 from Portage—Lisgar
- Churchill—Keewatinook Aski: Gains the Rural Municipality of Mountain, the Municipality of Minitonas–Bowsman, and the remainder of Division No. 19 not already in the riding from Dauphin—Swan River—Neepawa; gains the Obushkudayang and Little Saskatchewan 48 area from Selkirk—Interlake—Eastman
- Dauphin—Swan River—Neepawa: Loses the Rural Municipality of Mountain, the Municipality of Minitonas–Bowsman, and the parts of Division No. 19 in the riding to Churchill—Keewatinook Aski; gains Virden and the former Rural Municipality of Wallace and loses the CFB Shilo area to Brandon—Souris; gains the Municipality of Norfolk Treherne and the area around Long Plain 6 from Portage—Lisgar
- Elmwood—Transcona: Loses the Winnipeg neighbourhood of Grassie to Kildonan—St. Paul; gains that part of the Rural Municipality of Springfield located within the Red River Floodway from Provencher; gains the Winnipeg neighbourhood of Southland Park from St. Boniface—St. Vital
- Kildonan—St. Paul: Gains the Winnipeg neighbourhood of Grassie from Elmwood—Transcona; loses the Winnipeg neighbourhood of Leila North to Winnipeg North
- Portage—Lisgar: Loses the Municipality of Lorne, the Municipality of Pembina and Swan Lake 7 to Brandon—Souris; loses the Municipality of Norfolk Treherne and the area around Long Plain 6 to Dauphin—Swan River—Neepawa; gains the Rural Municipality of Woodlands from Selkirk—Interlake—Eastman; loses the Rural Municipality of St. François Xavier and the Rural Municipality of Cartier to Winnipeg West; gains the Rural Municipality of De Salaberry, the Rural Municipality of Montcalm, the Municipality of Emerson-Franklin, and the Village of St-Pierre-Jolys, and the Indian Reserves of Roseau River 2 and Roseau Rapids 2A from Provencher
- Provencher: Loses the Rural Municipality of De Salaberry, the Rural Municipality of Montcalm, the Municipality of Emerson-Franklin, and the Village of St-Pierre-Jolys, and the Indian Reserves of Roseau River 2 and Roseau Rapids 2A to Portage—Lisgar; loses that part of the Rural Municipality of Springfield located within the Red River Floodway to Elmwood—Transcona; loses the Rural Municipality of Whitemouth to Selkirk—Interlake—Eastman
- St. Boniface—St. Vital: Loses the Winnipeg neighbourhood of Southland Park from Elmwood—Transcona; gains the neighbourhood of Minnetonka from Winnipeg South
- Selkirk—Interlake—Eastman: Loses the Obushkudayang and Little Saskatchewan 48 area to Churchill—Keewatinook Aski; loses the Rural Municipality of Woodlands to Portage—Lisgar; gains the Rural Municipality of Whitemouth from Provencher
- Winnipeg Centre: Gains the Winnipeg neighbourhoods of North Point Douglas, Lord Selkirk Park and the eastern half of Dufferin from Winnipeg North
- Winnipeg North: Loses the Winnipeg neighbourhoods of North Point Douglas, Lord Selkirk Park and the eastern half of Dufferin to Winnipeg Centre; gains the Winnipeg neighbourhood of Leila North from Kildonan—St. Paul
- Winnipeg South: Loses the Winnipeg neighbourhood of Minnetonka to St. Boniface—St. Vital; loses the Winnipeg neighbourhoods of Whyte Ridge and Linden Ridge to Winnipeg South Centre
- Winnipeg South Centre: Gains the Winnipeg neighbourhoods of Whyte Ridge and Linden Ridge from Winnipeg South; loses the Winnipeg neighbourhoods of Tuxedo, Tuxedo South, Old Tuxedo and Edgeland to Winnipeg West
- Winnipeg West: Replaces Charleswood—St. James—Assiniboia—Headingley; gains the Winnipeg neighbourhoods of Tuxedo, Tuxedo South, Old Tuxedo and Edgeland from Winnipeg South Centre; gains the Rural Municipality of St. François Xavier and the Rural Municipality of Cartier from Portage—Lisgar

=== New Brunswick ===
On June 16, 2022, the Federal Electoral Boundaries Commission for New Brunswick released their initial proposal, proposing the following ridings:

- Acadie—Bathurst: Gains the remainder of the Regional Municipality of Tracadie from Miramichi—Grand Lake
- Beauséjour: Loses the remainder of Moncton to Moncton—Dieppe
- Fredericton—Oromocto: Replaces Fredericton; border with Tobique—Mactaquac rerouted to follow the northern border of the City of Fredericton (2023 borders); loses the remainder of the Parishes of Maugerville, Sheffield and Canning to Miramichi—Grand Lake; loses Burton Parish to Saint John—St. Croix
- Fundy Royal—Riverview: Replaces Fundy Royal; gains the remainder of the Town of Riverview from Moncton—Riverview—Dieppe; loses Waterborough to Miramichi—Grand Lake; loses Quispamsis to Saint John—Kennebecasis
- Madawaska—Restigouche: Gains the parishes of Drummond and Grand Falls and the municipalities of Saint-André, Grand Falls and Drummond from Tobique—Mactaquac. Boundary with Miramichi—Grand Lake rerouted around Mount Carleton Provincial Park and the Nepisiguit Protected Natural Area
- Miramichi—Grand Lake: Boundary with Madawaska—Restigouche rerouted around Mount Carleton Provincial Park and the Nepisiguit Protected Natural Area; loses the remainder of the Regional Municipality of Tracadie from Acadie—Bathurst; gains the remainder of the Parishes of Maugerville, Sheffield and Canning from Fredericton; gains Waterborough from Fundy Royal
- Moncton—Dieppe: Replaces Moncton—Riverview—Dieppe; loses the remainder of the Town of Riverview to Fundy Royal—Riverview; gains the remainder of Moncton from Beauséjour
- Saint John—Kennebecasis: New riding, consists of that part of the riding of Saint John—Rothesay east of the St. John River, plus the Town of Quispamsis
- Saint John—St. Croix: New riding, largely replacing New Brunswick Southwest; gains the City of Saint John west of the St. John River from Saint John—Rothesay; gains Burton from Fredericton; loses the Parishes of McAdam, Dumfries, Prince William, Manners Sutton, Kingsclear, and the municipalities of Hanwell, McAdam, Harvey and the Indian Reserve of Kingsclear 6 to Tobique—Mactaquac
- Tobique—Mactaquac: Gains the Parishes of McAdam, Dumfries, Prince William, Manners Sutton, Kingsclear, and the municipalities of Hanwell, McAdam, Harvey and the Indian Reserve of Kingsclear 6 from New Brunswick Southwest; border with Fredericton—Oromocto (replacing Fredericton) rerouted to follow the northern border of the City of Fredericton (2023 borders); loses the parishes of Drummond and Grand Falls and the municipalities of Saint-André, Grand Falls and Drummond to Madawaska—Restigouche

=== Newfoundland and Labrador ===
On June 28, 2022, the Federal Electoral Boundaries Commission for Newfoundland and Labrador released their initial proposal, proposing the following ridings:

- Avalon: Loses the communities of Victoria, Carbonear, Harbour Grace, Bryant's Cove, Upper Island Cove and Spaniard's Bay to Terra Nova—The Peninsulas; gains the remainder of Paradise from St. John's East; gains that part of St. John's west of Highway 1 from St. John's South—Mount Pearl
- Cape Spear: Replaces St. John's South—Mount Pearl; loses that part of St. John's west of Highway 1 to Avalon; loses the remainder of St. John's Harbour to St. John's East
- Labrador: No changes
- Long Range Mountains: Gains the communities of Galeville, Georges Cove and The Beaches from Coast of Bays—Central—Notre Dame
- Notre Dame—Bay d'Espoir: Replaces Coast of Bays—Central—Notre Dame; loses the communities of Galeville, Georges Cove and The Beaches to Long Range Mountains; gains the communities of Carmanville, Musgrave Harbour, Lumsden, New-Wes-Valley, Greenspond, Indian Bay and Centreville-Wareham-Trinity from Bonavista—Burin—Trinity
- St. John's East: Loses the remainder of Paradise to Avalon; gains the remainder of St. John's Harbour from St. John's South—Mount Pearl
- Terra Nova—The Peninsulas: Replaces Bonavista—Burin—Trinity; loses the communities of Carmanville, Musgrave Harbour, Lumsden, New-Wes-Valley, Greenspond, Indian Bay and Centreville-Wareham-Trinity to Coast of Bays—Central—Notre Dame; gains the communities of Victoria, Carbonear, Harbour Grace, Bryant's Cove, Upper Island Cove and Spaniard's Bay from Avalon.

=== Nova Scotia ===
On April 27, 2022, the Federal Electoral Boundaries Commission for Nova Scotia released their initial proposal, proposing the following ridings:

- Acadian Shore—Shelburne: Replaces West Nova; loses some territory (Berwick area) in Kings County to Kings—Hants; gains Shelburne County from South Shore—St. Margarets
- Cape Breton—Antigonish: Replaces Cape Breton—Canso, gains remainder of Antigonish County from Central Nova
- Cumberland—Colchester: No boundary changes proposed
- Dartmouth—Cole Harbour: Gains the Eastern Passage area from Sackville—Preston—Chezzetcook; loses all of the area north of Highways 111 and 7 to Shubenacadie—Bedford Basin
- Halifax: Loses the southern rural part of the riding to South Shore—St. Margarets and the Fairmount area to Halifax West
- Halifax West: Gains Fairmount area from Halifax; loses Parkdale, Lakeside and Beechville communities to South Shore—St. Margarets; loses Hammonds Plains area and northern part of Bedford to Shubenacadie—Bedford Basin
- Kings—Hants: Gains some territory in Kings County (Berwick area) from West Nova; loses Lantz area to Pictou—Eastern Shore—Preston
- Pictou—Eastern Shore—Preston: Replaces Central Nova; loses remainder of Antigonish County to Cape Breton—Antigonish; gains Lantz area from Kings—Hants; gains Preston, Chezzetcook and Lawrencetown areas from Sackville—Preston—Chezzetcook
- Shubenacadie—Bedford Basin: Replaces Sackville—Preston—Chezzetcook; gains Hammonds Plains and northern part of Bedford from Halifax West; loses Preston, Chezzetcook and Lawrencetown areas to Pictou—Eastern Shore—Preston
- South Shore—St. Margarets: Loses Shelburne County to Acadian Shore—Shelburne; Parkdale, Lakeside and Beechville communities from Halifax West; gains remainder of the rural part of the Chebucto Peninsula from Halifax
- Sydney—Victoria: No boundary changes proposed

=== Ontario ===
On August 19, 2022, the Federal Electoral Boundaries Commission for Ontario released their initial proposal, proposing the following ridings:

- Ajax: No boundary changes proposed
- Algonquin—Renfrew—Pembroke: Largely Replaces Renfrew—Nipissing—Pembroke
- Aurora—Oak Ridges—Richmond Hill
- Barrie—Innisfil: No boundary changes proposed
- Barrie—Springwater—Oro-Medonte
- Bay of Quinte: No boundary changes proposed
- Bayview—Finch: Largely replaces Willowdale
- Black Creek: Largely replaces Humber River—Black Creek
- Bowmanville—Oshawa North: Contains all of Durham south of Highway 407 and east of Oshawa Creek
- Brampton Centre: Re-oriented to a more central location within Brampton compared to its current location in the south-central part of the city
- Brampton—Chinguacousy: Largely replaces Brampton North
- Brampton—Mayfield West: New riding carved from Dufferin—Caledon, Brampton North and Brampton West
- Brampton North: Largely replaces Brampton East. Shares no territory with the current riding of Brampton North
- Brampton Southeast: New riding carved from parts of Brampton South, Brampton Centre and Brampton East
- Brampton Southwest: Largely replaces Brampton West
- Brantford: Largely replaces Brantford—Brant
- Bruce—Grey—Owen Sound
- Burlington Lakeshore: Largely replaces Burlington
- Burlington—Milton West: Largely replaces Milton
- Cambridge
- Carleton
- Chatham-Kent—Leamington—Kingsville: Largely replaces Chatham-Kent—Leamington
- Cochrane—Timmins—Timiskaming: Largely replaces Timmins-James Bay
- Collingwood—Blue Mountains: Largely replaces Simcoe—Grey
- Davenport
- Don Valley East
- Don Valley North
- Don Valley West
- Dufferin—Caledon
- Eglinton—Lawrence
- Elgin—Middlesex—Thames: New riding carved from Lambton—Kent—Middlesex and Elgin—Middlesex—London
- Essex
- Etobicoke Centre
- Etobicoke—Lakeshore
- Etobicoke North
- Flamborough—Glanbrook
- Gananoque—Brockville—Prescott: Largely replaces Leeds—Grenville—Thousand Islands and Rideau Lakes
- Georgetown—Milton East: New riding carved out of Wellington—Halton Hills, Milton and Oakville North—Burlington
- Guelph
- Haldimand—Norfolk—Six Nations: Largely replaces Haldimand—Norfolk
- Haliburton—Kawartha Lakes—Brock
- Hamilton Centre
- Hamilton Mountain
- Hamilton—Stoney Creek—Grimsby Lakeshore: Largely replaces Hamilton East—Stoney Creek
- Hamilton West—Ancaster—Dundas
- Hastings—Lennox and Addington—Tyendinaga: Largely replaces Hastings—Lennox and Addington
- Humber: Largely replaces York South—Weston
- Kanata: Largely replaces Kanata—Carleton
- Kenora—Thunder Bay—Rainy River: Largely replaces Thunder Bay—Rainy River
- Kiiwetinoong—Mushkegowuk: New riding carved out of Kenora, Timmins-James Bay, Thunder Bay—Superior North and a small part of Thunder Bay—Rainy River. Located in the far north of Ontario, the riding is a "special consideration" riding with small population due to its geographic size, isolated character, and the majority of its population being Indigenous
- King—Vaughan
- Kingston and the Islands: No boundary changes proposed
- Kitchener Centre
- Kitchener—Conestoga
- Kitchener South—North Dumfries: Largely replaces Kitchener South—Hespeler
- Lake Simcoe—Uxbridge: New riding carved out of York—Simcoe, Markham—Stouffville, Pickering—Uxbridge and Durham, 72% within York Region
- Lanark—Frontenac: Largely replaces Lanark—Frontenac—Kingston
- London Centre: Largely replaces London North Centre
- London Northeast: Largely replaces London—Fanshawe
- London South—St. Thomas: New riding carved out of parts of London—Fanshawe and Elgin—Middlesex—London
- London West
- Manitoulin—Nickel Belt: Combines parts of Nickel Belt with parts of Algoma—Manitoulin—Kapuskasing
- Markham—Stouffville
- Markham—Thornhill
- Markham—Unionville
- Mississauga Centre
- Mississauga East—Cooksville
- Mississauga—Erin Mills
- Mississauga—Lakeshore
- Mississauga—Malton
- Mississauga—Meadowvale: Largely replaces Mississauga—Streetsville
- Nepean
- New Tecumseth—Bradford: new riding carved out of parts of Simcoe—Grey, York—Simcoe and King—Vaughan, 73% within Simcoe County giving it a fifth riding
- Newmarket—Aurora
- Niagara Falls
- Niagara South: Largely replaces Niagara Centre
- Niagara West
- Nipissing: Largely replaces Nipissing—Timiskaming
- Northumberland: Largely replaces Northumberland—Peterborough South
- Oakville Lakeshore: Largely replaces Oakville
- Oakville North: Largely replaces Oakville North—Burlington
- Orléans
- Oshawa
- Ottawa Centre
- Ottawa South
- Ottawa—Vanier
- Ottawa West—Nepean
- Oxford—Brant: Largely replaces Oxford
- Parry Sound-Muskoka
- Penetanguishene—Couchiching: Largely replaces Simcoe North
- Perth Wellington
- Peterborough: Largely replaces Peterborough—Kawartha
- Pickering—Brooklin: Largely replaces Pickering—Uxbridge
- Prescott—Russell: Largely replaces Glengarry—Prescott—Russell
- Richmond Hill South: Largely replaces Richmond Hill
- Sarnia—Lambton—Bkejwanong: Largely replaces Sarnia—Lambton
- Sault Ste. Marie
- Scarborough Centre
- Scarborough-Guildwood
- Scarborough Northwest: Largely replaces Scarborough North and Scarborough—Agincourt
- Scarborough—Rouge Park
- Scarborough Southwest
- South Huron Shores: Largely replaces Huron—Bruce
- Spadina—Harbourfront: Largely replaces Spadina—Fort York
- St. Catharines
- St. Clair—Mount Pleasant: Largely replaces Toronto—St. Paul's
- Stormont—Dundas—Glengarry: Largely replaces Stormont—Dundas—South Glengarry
- Sudbury
- Taiaiako'n—High Park: Largely replaces Parkdale—High Park
- The Beaches—East York: Largely replaces Beaches—East York
- Thunder Bay—Superior North
- Toronto Centre
- Toronto—Danforth
- University—Rosedale
- Vaughan—Thornhill: Largely replaces Thornhill
- Vaughan—Woodbridge
- Waterloo
- Wellington—Halton: Largely replaces Wellington—Halton Hills
- Whitby
- Windsor—Tecumseh
- Windsor West
- York Centre

=== Prince Edward Island ===
On May 2, 2022, the Federal Electoral Boundaries Commission for Prince Edward Island released their initial proposal, proposing the following ridings:

- Cardigan: Loses all of its territory in North Shore and the North Shore Fire District, plus everything west of Highway 6 between them to Malpeque
- Charlottetown: No boundary changes proposed
- Egmont: Gains the Bedeque area plus some areas east and southeast of Summerside from Malpeque
- Malpeque: Gains the remainder of North Shore and the North Shore Fire District, plus everything west of Highway 6 between them from Cardigan; loses the Bedeque area plus some areas east and southeast of Summerside to Egmont.

=== Quebec ===
On July 29, 2022, the Federal Electoral Boundaries Commission for Quebec released their initial proposal, proposing the following ridings:

- Abitibi—Baie–James—Nunavik—Eeyou: No boundary changes proposed
- Abitibi—Témiscamingue: No boundary changes proposed
- Ahuntsic-Cartierville
- Alfred-Pellan
- Argenteuil—La Petite-Nation
- Beauce: No boundary changes proposed
- Beauport—Limoilou
- Bécancour—Nicolet—Saurel—Odanak: largely replaces Bécancour—Nicolet—Saurel
- Bellechasse—Les Etchemins—Lévis
- Beloeil—Chambly
- Berthier—Maskinongé
- Bourassa: No boundary changes proposed
- Brome—Missisquoi: No boundary changes proposed
- Brossard—Saint-Lambert: No boundary changes proposed
- Charlesbourg—Haute–Saint–Charles
- Châteauguay—Les Jardins-de-Napierville: largely replaces Châteauguay—Lacolle
- Chicoutimi—Le Fjord
- Compton—Stanstead
- Côte-de-Beaupré—Île d'Orléans—Charlevoix: largely replaces Beauport—Côte-de-Beaupré—Île d'Orléans—Charlevoix
- Dorval—Lachine—LaSalle
- Drummond
- Gaspésie—Les Îles-de-la-Madeleine—Listuguj: largely replaces Gaspésie—Les Îles-de-la-Madeleine
- Gatineau
- Hochelaga
- Honoré-Mercier
- Hull—Aylmer
- Joliette—Manawan: largely replaces Joliette
- Jonquière
- La Pointe-de-l'Île: No boundary changes proposed
- La Prairie—Atateken: replaces La Prairie
- Lac-Saint-Jean
- Lac-Saint-Louis: No boundary changes proposed
- LaSalle—Émard—Verdun
- Laurentides—Labelle
- Laurier—Sainte-Marie
- Laval—Les Îles
- Les Pays-d'en-Haut: new district
- Lévis—Lotbinière
- Longueuil—Charles-LeMoyne: No boundary changes proposed
- Longueuil—Saint-Hubert
- Louis-Hébert
- Louis-Saint-Laurent
- Manicouagan—Kawawachikamach—Uapishka: renamed from Manicouagan; no boundary changes proposed
- Marc-Aurèle-Fortin
- Mégantic—L'Érable
- Mirabel
- Mont-Royal
- Montarville
- Montcalm
- Montmagny—Témiscouata—Kataskomiq: largely replaces Montmagny—L'Islet—Kamouraska—Rivière-du-Loup
- Notre-Dame-de-Grâce—Westmount
- Outremont
- Papineau: No boundary changes proposed
- Pierre-Boucher—Les Patriotes—Verchères
- Pierrefonds—Dollard: No boundary changes proposed
- Pontiac—Kitigan Zibi: largely replaces Pontiac
- Portneuf—Jacques-Cartier
- Québec
- Repentigny
- Richmond—Arthabaska
- Rimouski—Matane: replaces about half of Rimouski-Neigette—Témiscouata—Les Basques
- Rivière-des-Mille-Îles
- Rivière-du-Nord
- Rosemont—La Petite-Patrie: No boundary changes proposed
- Saint-Hyacinthe—Bagot
- Saint-Jean: No boundary changes proposed
- Saint-Laurent
- Saint-Léonard—Saint-Michel
- Saint-Maurice—Champlain: No boundary changes proposed
- Salaberry—Suroît—Soulanges: largely replaces Salaberry—Suroît
- Shefford
- Sherbrooke
- Terrebonne
- Thérèse-De Blainville
- Trois-Rivières: No boundary changes proposed
- Vaudreuil: largely replaces Vaudreuil—Soulanges
- Ville-Marie—Le Sud-Ouest—Île-des-Sœurs
- Vimy

=== Saskatchewan ===
On May 9, 2022, the Federal Electoral Boundaries Commission for Saskatchewan released their initial proposal, proposing the following ridings:

- Desnethé—Missinippi—Churchill River: Loses Beaver River, Loon Lake, Medstead, Big River, Spiritwood, Canwood, Shellbrook, Lakeland, Paddockwood, Torch River and Hudson Bay rural municipalities and Prince Albert National Park
- Battlefords—Lloydminster: Gains Beaver River, Loon Lake, Medstead, Spiritwood, Big River and the western half of Canwood rural municipality; loses Heart's Hill, Progress, Mairposa, Grandview, Antelope Park, Prairiedale, Oakdale and Winslow rural municipalities
- Prince Albert: Gains eastern half of Canwood, and Shellbrook, Lakeland, Paddockwood and Torch River rural municipalities, Prince Albert National Park, and Duck Lake rural municipality east of Highway 11; loses Moose Range and Aborfield rural municipalities
- Saskatoon—Wanuskewin: Successor riding of Carlton Trail—Eagle Creek; loses territory southwest of Saskatoon, Duck Lake rural municipality east of Highway 11; gains Lake Lenore rural municipality, Humboldt Lake area, and the Silverwood Heights and Lawson Heights neighbourhoods of Saskatoon
- Saskatoon Centre: New riding located in the core of Saskatoon, encircled by Circle Drive except for the University of Saskatchewan
- Saskatoon—University: Loses Nutana, Varsity View, Grosvenor Park, Greystone Heights, Richmond Heights, North Park, Silverwood Heights and Lawson Heights neighbourhoods of Saskatoon; gains College Park East, Wildwood, Briarwood and Rosewood neighbourhoods
- Saskatoon—Grasswood: Vastly changes from its current iteration; gains all of area west of Circle Drive West and south of Graypool Drive from Saskatoon West; loses area north of Highway 11 and west of Circle Drive East to new riding of Saskatoon Centre; loses College Park East, Wildwood, Briarwood and Rosewood neighbourhoods to Saskatoon—University; gains area of Corman Park rural municipality from Carlton Trail—Eagle Creek
- Kindersley—Rosetown: New riding stretching from the Alberta border in the west, to the Quill Lakes in the east, from Saskatoon in the north to Regina in the south
- Regina—Qu'Appelle: Loses the rural municipalities of Big Quill, Elfros, Mount Hope, Emerald, Touchwood, Kellross, Ituna Bon Accord, Tullymet and Stanley; gains Lakeridge, Walsh Acres, Normanview and Regent Park neighbourhoods; loses area around Mosaic Stadium
- Regina—Lewvan: Lakeridge, Walsh Acres, Normanview and Regent Park neighbourhoods; gains Downtown Regina area and area around Mosaic Stadium
- Regina—Wascana: Loses Downtown Regina area, and rural areas in Sherwood Park rural municipality
- Yorkton—Melville: Gains rural municipalities of Moose Range, Aborfield, Hudson Bay, Elfros, Emerald, Touchwood, Kellross, Ituna Bon Accord, Tullymet and Stanley; loses rural municipality of Lakeside
- Moose Jaw—Swift Current—Grasslands: Largely made up of Cypress Hills—Grasslands south of the South Saskatchewan River (except for the Stonehenge, Lake of the Rivers, Old Post, Willow Bunch, Poplar Valley, Maple Bush and Enfield rural municipalities), plus the city of Moose Jaw, and the rural municipalities of Moose Jaw, Baildon and Terrell
- Souris—Moose Mountain: Gains rural municipalities of Stonehenge, Lake of the Rivers, Old Post, Willow Bunch, Poplar Valley, Pense, Sherwood, Redburn, Bratt's Lake, Elmsthorpe and Caledonia.

== Public hearings ==
The publication of the initial proposals by each of the Boundary Commissions was followed by 150 virtual and in person public hearings.

Province	Publication of initial proposal	Public hearings	No. of public hearings	Publication of final report (Note: The 10 month deadline to publish the final report for all commissions except Quebec was December 9, 2022, with a 2 month extension to February 9, 2023, available to commissions that requested it.)
Newfoundland and Labrador	June 28, 2022	August 15, 2022 – September 16, 2022	15	December 7, 2022
Prince Edward Island	May 2, 2022	June 7, 2022 – June 9, 2022	3	November 29, 2022
Nova Scotia	April 27, 2022	May 30, 2022 – June 27, 2022	9	November 17, 2022
New Brunswick	June 16, 2022	September 7, 2022 – September 29, 2022	9 (Note: Two public hearings were cancelled)	November 30, 2022
Quebec	July 29, 2022	September 6, 2022 – October 13, 2022	20	February 1, 2023
Ontario	August 19, 2022	September 26, 2022 – November 8, 2022	23	February 10, 2023
Manitoba	June 16, 2022	September 7, 2022 – September 22, 2022	4 (Note: One public hearing was cancelled)	December 6, 2022
Saskatchewan	May 9, 2022	June 20, 2022 – July 14, 2022	15	December 6, 2022
Alberta	June 10, 2022	September 6, 2022 – October 14, 2022	25	February 2, 2023
British Columbia	May 2, 2022	June 6, 2022 – September 29, 2022	27	February 8, 2023

== Final report ==
=== Alberta ===
On February 2, 2023, the Federal Electoral Boundaries Commission for Alberta released their final report, submitting to the House of Commons the following ridings:

- Airdrie—Cochrane: Carved out of Banff—Airdrie. Consists of Airdie, Cochrane and the central part of Rocky View County
- Battle River—Crowfoot: Gains the remainder of Kneehill County, including the villages of Linden, Acme and Carbon from Bow River; loses all of its territory in Leduc County to Leduc—Wetaskiwin
- Bow River: Loses all of its territory in Kneehill County, including the villages of Linden, Acme and Carbon to Battle River—Crowfoot; loses all of its territory west of Highways 23 and Highway 24 in Vulcan County, including all of the Town of Vulcan to Foothills; gains a bit of area in Rocky View County east of Airdrie from Banff—Airdrie
- Calgary Centre: Loses the neighbourhoods of Lincoln Park, Rutland Park, CFB Currie and that part of Richmond west of Crowchild Trail and south of Richmond Road and all of its territory in Shaganappi and Rosscarrock to Calgary Signal Hill
- Calgary Confederation: Loses the neighbourhoods of Dalhousie, Highland Park, Highwood, Queens Park Village and Greemview to Calgary Nose Hill; gains the neighbourhoods of Bowness and Greenwood/Greenbriar from Calgary Signal Hill
- Calgary Crowfoot: Largely replaces Calgary Rocky Ridge; loses the neighbourhood of Kincora to Calgary Nose Hill, and the neighbourhoods of Evanston and Sage Hill east of Symons Valley Rd to Calgary Skyview
- Calgary East: New riding created out of Calgary Forest Lawn south of 16 Ave NE plus part of Vista Heights; and that part of Calgary Shepard north of a line following 130 Ave SE to 52 St SE to Glenmore Trail
- Calgary Heritage: Loses the neighbourhood of Kingsland to Calgary Midnapore; gains the neighbourhoods of Millrise and Shawnessy from Calgary Midnapore
- Calgary McKnight: New riding created out of Calgary Forest Lawn north of 16 Ave NE excluding part of Vista Heights; and that part of Calgary Skyview south of a line following Deerfoot Trail NE to Country Hills Blvd. NE to Metis Trail NE to 96 Ave NE to 68 St NE to 80 Ave NE
- Calgary Midnapore: Gains the neighbourhood of Kingsland from Calgary Heritage; loses the neighbourhoods of Millrise and Shawnessy to Calgary Heritage
- Calgary Nose Hill: Gains the neighbourhoods of Dalhousie, Highland Park, Highwood, Queens Park Village and Greemview from Calgary Confederation; gains the neighbourhood of Kincora from Calgary Rocky Ridge; loses the neighbourhood of Panorama Hills to Calgary Skyview; gains the neighbourhood of Harvest Hills from Calgary Skyview
- Calgary Shepard: Loses all of its territory north of a line following 130 Ave SE to 52 St SE to Glenmore Trail to Calgary East
- Calgary Signal Hill: Gains the neighbourhoods of Lincoln Park, Rutland Park, CFB Currie, Shaganappi, Rosscarrock and that part of Richmond west of Crowchild Trail and south of Richmond Road from Calgary Centre; loses the neighbourhoods of Bowness and Greenwood/Greenbriar to Calgary Confederation
- Calgary Skyview: Loses all of its territory south of a line following Deerfoot Trail NE to Country Hills Blvd. NE to Metis Trail NE to 96 Ave NE to 68 St NE to 80 Ave NE to Calgary McKnight; loses the neighbourhood of Harvest Hills to Calgary Nose Hill; gains the neighbourhood of Panorama Hills from Calgary Nose Hill; gains the neighbourhoods of Evanston and Sage Hill east of Symons Valley Rd from Calgary Rocky Ridge
- Edmonton Centre: Gains the neighbourhoods of Athlone, Kensington and Calder from Edmonton Griesbach; loses the remainder of the neighbourhood of McCauley to Edmonton Griesbach; loses all of its territory south of the Mackenzie Ravine to 95 Ave to Edmonton West; gains the neighbourhoods of Glenwood, Britannia Youngstown and Mayfield from Edmonton West
- Edmonton Gateway: New riding; consists of Edmonton Mill Woods west of 66 St (except for the area north of 34 Ave and west of 99 St); Edmonton Riverbend east of 111 St (except the neighbourhood of Twin Brooks); and the neighbourhoods of Rutherford, Blackmud Creek, Cashman, Cavanagh, Callaghan, Allard, Desrochers, Ellerslie, Summerside, The Orchards at Ellerslie, and the southern half of Walker from Edmonton—Wetaskiwin
- Edmonton Griesbach: Gains the neighbourhoods of Eaux Claires, Belle Rive and Mayliewan from Edmonton Manning; gains the neighbourhood of Riverdale from Edmonton Strathcona; gains the remainder of McCauley from Edmonton Centre; loses the neighbourhoods of Athlone, Kensington and Calder to Edmonton Centre; loses the neighbourhood of Wellington to Edmonton Northwest
- Edmonton Manning: Loses the neighbourhoods of Lorelei and Beaumaris to Edmonton Northwest; loses the neighbourhoods of Eaux Claires, Belle Rive and Mayliewan to Edmonton Griesbach
- Edmonton Northwest: New riding, consisting mostly of the Edmonton portions of St. Albert—Edmonton, plus the neighbourhoods of Lorelei and Beaumaris from Edmonton Manning; Wellington from Edmonton Griesbach; and that part of Edmonton West north of a line following Whitemud Dr to Anthony Henday Dr to 87 Av to 178 St to 95 Av, to 170 St to Mayfield Rd to 111 Av
- Edmonton Riverbend: Loses the neighbourhoods of Aspen Gardens, Royal Gardens, Rideau Park and Duggan to Edmonton Strathcona; loses the area east of 111 St (except the neighbourhood of Twin Brooks) to Edmonton Gateway; gains the neighbourhoods of Keswick, the remainder of Ambleside, Glenridding Heights, Glenridding Ravine, Hays Ridge, Graydon Hill, Paisley, and Chappelle and everything in Edmonton south of those neighbourhoods and west of the Queen Elizabeth Highway in Edmonton—Wetaskiwin; loses the neighbourhood of Windermere to Edmonton West
- Edmonton Southeast: Largely replaces Edmonton Mill Woods; loses the area west of 66 St to Edmonton Gateway (except for the area north of 34 Ave and west of 99 St which is being transferred to Edmonton Strathcona); gains the neighbourhoods of Charlesworth and the northern half of Walker plus the rural south-eastern part of the city from Edmonton—Wetaskiwin
- Edmonton Strathcona: Loses the neighbourhood of Riverdale to Edmonton Griesbach; gains the neighbourhoods of Aspen Gardens, Royal Gardens, Rideau Park and Duggan from Edmonton Riverbend; gains the area north of 34 Ave and west of 99 St from Edmonton Mill Woods
- Edmonton West: Gains the neighbourhood of Windermere from Edmonton Riverbend; loses the area north of a line following Whitemud Dr to Anthony Henday Dr to 87 Av to 178 St to 95 Av, to 170 St to Mayfield Rd to 111 Av. to Edmonton Northwest; loses the neighbourhoods of Glenwood, Britannia Youngstown and Mayfield to Edmonton Centre; gains all of Edmonton Centre south of the Mackenzie Ravine to 95 Ave
- Foothills: Loses remainder of Kananaskis and Rocky View County (except Bragg Creek area) to Jasper—Banff—Canmore; gains territory west of Highways 23 and Highway 24 in Vulcan County, including all of the Town of Vulcan from Bow River; gains Blood 148 and Blood 148A Indian Reserves plus the remainder of Improvement District No. 4 Waterton from Medicine Hat—Cardston—Warner
- Fort McMurray—Cold Lake: Gains area north of Highway 659 and east of Durlingville from Lakeland
- Grande Prairie: Replaces Grande Prairie—Mackenzie; loses its territory east of the Smoky River and its north-eastern pan-handle generally east of Hay River to Peace River—Westlock
- Jasper—Banff—Canmore: New district based along the Rocky Mountains. Contains Jasper, Edson, Hinton, Rocky Mountain House, Caroline, Sundre, Cremona, Carstairs, Crossfield, Canmore and Banff
- Lakeland: Loses area north of Highway 659 and east of Durlingville to Fort McMurray—Cold Lake
- Leduc—Wetaskiwin: New district mostly containing the non-Edmonton parts of Edmonton—Wetaskiwin, but contains all of Leduc County (including Warburg and Thorsby), and all of the Indian Reserves between Wetaskiwin and Ponoka
- Lethbridge: No change
- Medicine Hat—Cardston—Warner: Loses Blood 148 and Blood 148A Indian Reserves plus the remainder of Improvement District No. 4 Waterton to Foothills
- Parkland: New district based in the western exurbs of Edmonton. Includes all of Parkland County including Spruce Grove, Stony Plain, Spring Lake; Brazeau County including Drayton Valley and Breton; the eastern part of Yellowhead County around Chip Lake and the part of Lac Ste. Anne County around Mayerthorpe
- Peace River—Westlock: Gains the territory east of the Smoky River and the north-eastern pan-handle generally east of Hay River from Grande Prairie—Mackenzie
- Ponoka—Didsbury: New district created from much of the rural areas of the two Red Deer based ridings. Contains Ponoka County, Lacombe County, and the municipalities they surround, the western half of Red Deer County including Innisfail and Bowden and the northeastern half of Mountain View County including Olds and Didsbury
- Red Deer: New district. Contains Red Deer and the eastern half of Red Deer County including Penhold, Delburne and Elnora
- Sherwood Park—Fort Saskatchewan: No change
- St. Albert—Sturgeon River: New district. Contains St. Albert, Sturgeon County and the municipalities it surrounds, and most of Lac Ste. Anne County and the municipalities it surrounds except for the Mayerthorpe area.

=== British Columbia ===
On February 8, 2023, the Federal Electoral Boundaries Commission for British Columbia released their final report, submitting to the House of Commons the following ridings:

- Abbotsford—South Langley
- Burnaby Central
- Burnaby North—Seymour
- Capilano—North Vancouver
- Cariboo—Prince George
- Chilliwack—Hope
- Cloverdale—Langley City
- Columbia—Kootenay—Southern Rockies
- Coquitlam—Port Coquitlam
- Courtenay—Alberni
- Cowichan—Malahat—Langford
- Delta
- Esquimalt—Saanich—Sooke
- Fleetwood—Port Kells
- Howe Sound—West Vancouver
- Kamloops—Shuswap—Central Rockies
- Kamloops—Thompson—Nicola
- Kelowna
- Langley Township
- Mission—Matsqui—Abbotsford
- Nanaimo—Ladysmith
- New Westminster—Burnaby—Maillardville
- North Island—Powell River
- Okanagan Lake West—South Kelowna
- Pitt Meadows—Maple Ridge
- Port Moody—Coquitlam
- Prince George—Peace River—Northern Rockies
- Richmond Centre—Marpole
- Richmond East—Steveston
- Saanich—Gulf Islands
- Similkameen—West Kootenay
- Skeena—Bulkley Valley
- South Surrey—White Rock
- Surrey Centre
- Surrey Newton
- Vancouver Arbutus
- Vancouver Centre
- Vancouver East
- Vancouver Fraserview—South Burnaby
- Vancouver Kingsway
- Vancouver West Broadway
- Vernon—Monashee
- Victoria

=== Manitoba ===
On December 6, 2022, the Federal Electoral Boundaries Commission for Manitoba released their final report, submitting to the House of Commons the following ridings:

- Brandon—Souris: Gains Sioux Valley Dakota Nation plus the part of the Rural Municipality of Wallace – Woodworth that it exclaves, and the CFB Shilo area from Dauphin—Swan River—Neepawa; gains the Municipality of Pembina from Portage—Lisgar
- Churchill—Keewatinook Aski: Loses the Peonan Point area and the remainder of Little Saskatchewan 48 to Selkirk—Interlake—Eastman
- Elmwood—Transcona: Loses area north of Leighton Avenue and west of Raleigh Street to Kildonan—St. Paul; gains the Navin, Norcan and Dugald areas from Provencher
- Kildonan—St. Paul: Loses the Winnipeg neighbourhood of Leila North to Winnipeg North; gains the area north of Leighton Avenue and west of Raleigh Street from Elmwood—Transcona; gains that part of the Rural Municipality of Springfield north of Springfield Road and west of Spruce Road (Oakbank area) from Provencher
- Portage—Lisgar: Loses the Municipality of Pembina to Brandon—Souris; loses the Municipality of Norfolk Treherne and the area around Long Plain 6 to Riding Mountain
- Provencher: Loses the Navin, Norcan and Dugald areas to Elmwood—Transcona; loses that part of the Rural Municipality of Springfield north of Springfield Road and west of Spruce Road (Oakbank area) to Kildonan—St. Paul
- Riding Mountain: Largely replaces Dauphin—Swan River—Neepawa; loses the Sioux Valley Dakota Nation plus the part of the Rural Municipality of Wallace – Woodworth that it exclaves, and the CFB Shilo area to Brandon—Souris; gains the Municipality of Norfolk Treherne and the area around Long Plain 6 to Portage—Lisgar
- Selkirk—Interlake—Eastman: Gains the Peonan Point area and the remainder of Little Saskatchewan 48 from Churchill—Keewatinook Aski; loses the Rural Municipality of Rosser to Winnipeg West
- St. Boniface—St. Vital: Gains the neighbourhood of Minnetonka from Winnipeg South
- Winnipeg Centre: Gains the Winnipeg neighbourhoods of North Point Douglas, Lord Selkirk Park and the eastern half of Dufferin from Winnipeg North
- Winnipeg North: Loses the Winnipeg neighbourhoods of North Point Douglas, Lord Selkirk Park and the eastern half of Dufferin to Winnipeg Centre; gains the Winnipeg neighbourhood of Leila North from Kildonan—St. Paul
- Winnipeg South: Loses the Winnipeg neighbourhood of Minnetonka to St. Boniface—St. Vital; loses the Winnipeg neighbourhoods of Whyte Ridge and Linden Ridge to Winnipeg South Centre
- Winnipeg South Centre: Gains the Winnipeg neighbourhoods of Whyte Ridge and Linden Ridge from Winnipeg South; loses the Winnipeg neighbourhoods of Tuxedo, Tuxedo South, Old Tuxedo and Edgeland to Winnipeg West
- Winnipeg West: Replaces Charleswood—St. James—Assiniboia—Headingley; gains the Rural Municipality of Rosser from Selkirk—Interlake—Eastman.

=== New Brunswick ===
On November 30, 2022, the Federal Electoral Boundaries Commission for New Brunswick released their final report, submitting to the House of Commons the following ridings:

- Acadie—Bathurst: Gains the remainder of the Regional Municipality of Tracadie from Miramichi—Grand Lake
- Beauséjour: Loses the remainder of Moncton to Moncton—Dieppe
- Fredericton—Oromocto: Replaces Fredericton; border with Tobique—Mactaquac rerouted to follow the northern border of the City of Fredericton (2023 borders); loses the remainder of the Parishes of Maugerville, Sheffield and Canning to Miramichi—Grand Lake; loses Burton Parish to Saint John—St. Croix, except for those parts of the parish that will be transferred to the Town of Oromocto in 2023
- Fundy Royal: Gains the remainder of the Town of Riverview from Moncton—Riverview—Dieppe; loses Waterborough to Miramichi—Grand Lake; loses Quispamsis to Saint John—Kennebecasis
- Madawaska—Restigouche: Gains the parishes of Drummond and the northern half of Grand Falls and the municipalities of Saint-André, Grand Falls and Drummond from Tobique—Mactaquac. Boundary with Miramichi—Grand Lake rerouted around Mount Carleton Provincial Park and the Nepisiguit Protected Natural Area
- Miramichi—Grand Lake: Boundary with Madawaska—Restigouche rerouted around Mount Carleton Provincial Park and the Nepisiguit Protected Natural Area; loses the remainder of the Regional Municipality of Tracadie to Acadie—Bathurst; gains the remainder of the Parishes of Maugerville, Sheffield and Canning from Fredericton; gains Waterborough from Fundy Royal
- Moncton—Dieppe: Replaces Moncton—Riverview—Dieppe; loses the remainder of the Town of Riverview to Fundy Royal; gains the remainder of the City of Moncton from Beauséjour and Fundy Royal (2023 borders)
- Saint John—Kennebecasis: New riding, consists of the City of Saint John east of the St. John River, plus the Towns of Quispamsis and Rothesay (2023 borders)
- Saint John—St. Croix: New riding, largely replacing New Brunswick Southwest; gains the City of Saint John west of the St. John River from Saint John—Rothesay; gains Burton from Fredericton; loses the Parishes of Dumfries, Prince William, Manners Sutton, Kingsclear, and the municipalities of Hanwell, and Harvey and the Indian Reserve of Kingsclear 6 to Tobique—Mactaquac
- Tobique—Mactaquac: Gains the Parishes of Dumfries, Prince William, Manners Sutton, and Kingsclear, and the municipalities of Hanwell, and Harvey and the Indian Reserve of Kingsclear 6 from New Brunswick Southwest; border with Fredericton—Oromocto (replacing Fredericton) rerouted to follow the northern border of the City of Fredericton (2023 borders); loses the parishes of Drummond and Grand Falls and the municipalities of Saint-André, Grand Falls and Drummond to Madawaska—Restigouche

=== Newfoundland and Labrador ===
On December 7, 2022, the Federal Electoral Boundaries Commission for Newfoundland and Labrador released their final report, submitting to the House of Commons the following ridings:

- Avalon: Loses the eastern shore of Placentia Bay to Terra Nova—The Peninsulas; gains Salmon Cove from Bonavista—Burin—Trinity; loses the remainder of Paradise to Cape Spear; gains Witless Bay, Bay Bulls and the Southlands and Goulds areas of St. John's from St. John's South—Mount Pearl
- Cape Spear: Largely replaces St. John's South—Mount Pearl; gains Paradise from Avalon and St. John's East; loses Witless Bay, Bay Bulls and the Southlands and Goulds areas of St. John's to Avalon; loses the remainder of St. John's Harbour, the Wishingwell Park area and the Ayre Athletic Field area to St. John's East
- Central Newfoundland: Replaces Coast of Bays—Central—Notre Dame; loses the communities of Galeville, Georges Cove and The Beaches to Long Range Mountains
- Labrador: No changes
- Long Range Mountains: Gains the communities of Galeville, Georges Cove and The Beaches from Coast of Bays—Central—Notre Dame
- St. John's East: Loses the remainder of Paradise to Cape Spear; gains the remainder of St. John's Harbour, the Wishingwell Park area and the Ayre Athletic Field area from St. John's South—Mount Pearl
- Terra Nova—The Peninsulas. Largely replaces Bonavista—Burin—Trinity; gains the eastern shore of Placentia Bay from Avalon; loses Salmon Cove to Avalon.

=== Nova Scotia ===
On November 17, 2022, the Federal Electoral Boundaries Commission for Nova Scotia released their final report, submitting to the House of Commons the following ridings:

- Acadie—Annapolis: Replaces West Nova; loses some territory (Berwick area) in Kings County to Kings—Hants
- Cape Breton—Canso—Antigonish: Mostly replaces Cape Breton—Canso; gains remainder of Antigonish County from Central Nova. Exchanges territory with Sydney—Victoria (gains Victoria, remainder of Inverness and rural western part of the Cape Breton Regional Municipality; loses urban part of the Cape Breton Regional Municipality from Sydney Forks to Morien, including Glace Bay area)
- Cumberland—Colchester (no changes)
- Dartmouth—Cole Harbour: Gains the Eastern Passage area from Sackville—Preston—Chezzetcook; loses all of the area north of Highways 111 and 118 plus the Lake Charles area to Sackville—Bedford—Preston
- Halifax: Loses the Fairmount area to Halifax West
- Halifax West: Gains the Fairmount area from Halifax and the Chebucto Peninsula from South Shore—St. Margarets; loses the Bedford, Hammonds Plains and Lucasville areas to Sackville—Bedford—Preston
- Kings—Hants: Gains some territory (Berwick area) in Kings County from West Nova
- Pictou—Eastern Shore: Replaces Central Nova; loses the remainder of Antigonish County to Cape Breton—Canso—Antigonish; gains the Lawrencetown, Porters Lake and Chezzetcook from Sackville—Preston—Chezzetcook
- Sackville—Bedford—Preston: Replaces Sackville—Preston—Chezzetcook; gains the Bedford, Hammonds Plains and Lucasville areas from Halifax West; gains the area north of Highways 111 and 118 plus the Lake Charles area from Dartmouth—Cole Harbour; loses the Lawrencetown, Porters Lake and Chezzetcook areas to Pictou—Eastern Shore
- South Shore—St. Margarets: Loses the Chebucto Peninsula to Halifax West
- Sydney—Glace Bay: Mostly replaces Sydney—Victoria. Exchanges territory with Cape Breton—Canso (loses Victoria, remainder of Inverness and rural western part of the Cape Breton Regional Municipality; gains urban part of the Cape Breton Regional Municipality from Sydney Forks to Morien, including Glace Bay area).

=== Ontario ===
On February 10, 2023, the Federal Electoral Boundaries Commission for Ontario released their final report, submitting to the House of Commons the following ridings:

- Ajax
- Algonquin—Renfrew—Pembroke
- Aurora—Oak Ridges—Richmond Hill
- Barrie North—Springwater—Oro-Medonte
- Barrie South—Innisfil
- Bay of Quinte
- Beaches—East York
- Bowmanville—Oshawa North
- Brampton Centre
- Brampton East
- Brampton North—Caledon
- Brampton South
- Brampton West
- Brampton—Chinguacousy Park
- Brantford—Brant South—Six Nations
- Bruce—Grey—Owen Sound
- Burlington
- Burlington North—Milton West
- Cambridge
- Carleton
- Chatham-Kent—Leamington
- Davenport
- Don Valley North
- Don Valley South
- Dufferin—Caledon
- Eglinton—Lawrence
- Elgin—St. Thomas—London South
- Essex
- Etobicoke Centre
- Etobicoke North
- Etobicoke—Lakeshore
- Flamborough—Glanbrook—Brant North
- Guelph
- Haldimand—Norfolk
- Haliburton—Kawartha Lakes
- Hamilton Centre
- Hamilton East—Stoney Creek
- Hamilton Mountain
- Hamilton West—Ancaster—Dundas
- Hastings—Lennox and Addington—Tyendinaga
- Humber River—Black Creek
- Huron—Bruce
- Kanata
- Kapuskasing—Timmins—Mushkegowuk
- Kenora—Kiiwetinoong
- Kingston and the Islands
- King—Vaughan
- Kitchener Centre
- Kitchener South—Hespeler
- Kitchener—Conestoga
- Lanark—Frontenac
- Leeds—Grenville—Thousand Islands—Rideau Lakes
- London Centre
- London West
- London—Fanshawe
- Manitoulin—Nickel Belt
- Markham—Stouffville
- Markham—Thornhill
- Markham—Unionville
- Middlesex—London
- Milton East—Halton Hills South
- Mississauga Centre
- Mississauga East—Cooksville
- Mississauga—Erin Mills
- Mississauga—Lakeshore
- Mississauga—Malton
- Mississauga—Streetsville
- Nepean
- New Tecumseth—Gwillimbury new riding carved out of parts of Simcoe—Grey and York—Simcoe, 72% within Simcoe County giving it a fifth riding
- Newmarket—Aurora
- Niagara North
- Niagara South
- Niagara West
- Nipissing—Timiskaming
- Northumberland—Clarke
- Oakville East
- Oakville West
- Orléans
- Oshawa
- Ottawa Centre
- Ottawa South
- Ottawa West—Nepean
- Ottawa—Vanier—Gloucester
- Oxford
- Parry Sound-Muskoka
- Perth Wellington
- Peterborough
- Pickering—Brooklin
- Prescott—Russell—Cumberland
- Richmond Hill South
- Sarnia—Lambton—Bkejwanong
- Sault Ste. Marie—Algoma
- Scarborough Centre—Don Valley East
- Scarborough North
- Scarborough Southwest
- Scarborough—Agincourt
- Scarborough—Guildwood—Rouge Park
- Scarborough—Woburn
- Simcoe North
- Simcoe—Grey
- Spadina—Harbourfront
- St. Catharines
- Stormont—Dundas—Glengarry
- Sudbury
- Taiaiko'n—Parkdale—High Park
- Thunder Bay—Rainy River
- Thunder Bay—Superior North
- Toronto Centre
- Toronto—Danforth
- Toronto—St. Paul's
- University—Rosedale
- Vaughan—Thornhill
- Vaughan—Woodbridge
- Waterloo
- Wellington—Halton Hills North
- Whitby
- Willowdale
- Windsor West
- Windsor—Tecumseh
- York Centre
- York South—Weston—Etobicoke
- York—Durham

=== Prince Edward Island ===
On November 29, 2022, the Federal Electoral Boundaries Commission for Prince Edward Island released their final report, submitting to the House of Commons the following ridings: The map is nearly identical to the commission's initial proposal, save for a small part of what had been the North Shore Fire District located west of Highway 25 and north of Highway 2 being transferred to Charlottetown. This area was annexed into the City of Charlottetown in June 2022.

- Cardigan: Loses all of its territory in North Shore and the North Shore Fire District, plus everything west of Highway 6 between them to Malpeque
- Charlottetown: Gains newly annexed territory by the City of Charlottetown in the Marshfield area from Malpeque
- Egmont: Gains the Bedeque area plus some areas east and southeast of Summerside from Malpeque
- Malpeque: Gains the remainder of North Shore and the North Shore Fire District, plus everything west of Highway 6 between them from Cardigan; loses the Bedeque area plus some areas east and southeast of Summerside to Egmont; loses newly annexed territory by the City of Charlottetown in the Marshfield area to Charlottetown.

=== Quebec ===
On February 1, 2023, the Federal Electoral Boundaries Commission for Quebec released their final report, submitting to the House of Commons the following ridings:

- Abitibi—Baie-James—Nunavik—Eeyou: No change
- Abitibi—Témiscamingue: No change
- Ahuntsic-Cartierville: Loses the territory south of Boul. Acadie and east of Boul. Henri-Bourassa to Saint-Laurent
- Alfred-Pellan: Gains the territory east of Boul. des Laurentides from Vimy
- Argenteuil—La Petite-Nation: Loses the municipalities of Wentworth-Nord, Lac-des-Seize-Îles, Wentworth, Saint-Adolphe-d'Howard, Morin-Heights, Mille-Isles and Gore to Les Pays-d'en-Haut; gains Val-des-Monts from Pontiac; gains that part of the city of Gatineau north of Autoroute 50; and that part of Gatineau east of Av. du Cheval-Blanc, and south of a line that follows Rivière Blanche to Highway 148 from the riding of Gatineau
- Beauce: No change
- Beauharnois—Soulanges: Largely replaces Salaberry—Suroît; gains Les Cèdres and Pointe-des-Cascades from Vaudreuil—Soulanges; loses the remainder of the Le Haut-Saint-Laurent MRC and both the Town and Township of Hemmingford to Châteauguay—Les Jardins-de-Napierville
- Beauport—Limoilou: Gains the remainder of the Chutes-Montmorency neighbourhood from Beauport—Côte-de-Beaupré—Île d'Orléans—Charlevoix; gains territory from Charlesbourg—Haute-Saint-Charles south of a line that follows Rue de Chamonix, 10e Av. East, and Boul. Louix-XIV; and an additional territory south of a line that follows 41e Rue West, to Boul. Henri-Bourassa to Autoroute 40
- Bécancour—Saurel—Odanak: Largely replaces Bécancour—Nicolet—Saurel; gains Leclercville and Val-Alain from Lévis—Lotbinière; gains Villeroy from Mégantic—L'Érable
- Bellechasse—Les Etchemins—Lévis: Loses area west of 4e Av. and Rue St-Eustache in Lévis to Lévis—Lotbinière
- Beloeil—Chambly: Loses Carignan to Montarville
- Berthier—Maskinongé: Gains Saint-Sulpice from Repentigny
- Bourassa: No change
- Brome—Missisquoi: No change
- Brossard—Saint-Lambert: No change
- Charlesbourg—Haute-Saint-Charles: Gains territory from Louis-Saint-Laurent east of the following line: Boul. Val-Cartier to Rue de la Rivière-Nelson, Rivière Saint-Charles, the eastern limits of the Wendake Indian Reserve, Boul. Bastien, Boul. Pierre-Bertrand; loses the territory east of Ch. de Château-Bigot and Av. du Bourg-Royal and north of Boul. Louis-XIV to Montmorency—Charlevoix; loses territory to Beauport—Limoilou south of a line that follows Rue de Chamonix, 10e Av. East, and Boul. Louix-XIV; and an additional territory south of a line that follows 41e Rue West, to Boul. Henri-Bourassa to Autoroute 40
- Châteauguay—Les Jardins-de-Napierville: Largely replaces Châteauguay—Lacolle; gains both the Village and Township of Hemmingford, and the municipalities of Très-Saint-Sacrement, Howick, Saint-Chrysostome, Havelock, and Franklin from Salaberry—Suroît; loses a small piece of territory north of Autoroute 30 in Saint-Isidore and a small piece of territory near Ch. St-Bernard in Châteauguay to La Prairie—Atateken
- Chicoutimi—Le Fjord: Gains the unorganized territories of Lac-Ministuk and Mont-Valin, and the municipalities of Sainte-Rose-du-Nord and Saint-Fulgence, and the remainder of the borough of Chicoutimi from Jonquière
- Compton—Stanstead: Loses Weedon, Lingwick and Scotstown to Mégantic—L'Érable; gains the Parc-Belvédère area from Sherbrooke
- Côte-Nord—Kawawachikamach—Uapashke: New name for Manicouagan. No other changes
- Dorval—Lachine: Replaces Dorval—Lachine—LaSalle; loses area east of Av. 90e East and south of Rue Airlie to LaSalle—Verdun
- Drummond: No change
- Gaspésie—Les Îles-de-la-Madeleine—Listuguj: Replaces Gaspésie—Les Îles-de-la-Madeleine; gains the entirety of the MRCs of La Matanie and Avignon from Avignon—La Mitis—Matane—Matapédia
- Gatineau: Loses that part of the city of Gatineau north of Autoroute 50; and that part of the City of Gatineau east of Av. du Cheval-Blanc, and south of a line that follows Rivière Blanche to Highway 148 to Argenteuil—La Petite-Nation; gains the remainder of the City of Gatineau west of Montée Paiement from Pontiac
- Hochelaga: The boundary with Saint-Léonard—Saint-Michel along Rue Bélanger moved to the borough boundary between Rosemont—La-Petite-Patrie and Saint-Léonard
- Honoré-Mercier: Gains the territory north of Boul. Langelier and west of Rue Bombardier from Saint-Léonard—Saint-Michel
- Hull—Aylmer: Loses the remainder of the Plateau neighbourhood to Pontiac—Kitigan Zibi
- Joliette—Manawan: Replaces Joliette; loses the municipalities of Saint-Donat and Notre-Dame-de-la-Merci to Laurentides—Labelle; loses Entrelacs and Chertsey to Les Pays-d'en-Haut; gains the Domaine-Ouellet area from Repentigny
- Jonquière—Alma: Largely replaces Jonquière; gains the city of Alma from Lac-Saint-Jean; loses the unorganized territories of Lac-Ministuk and Mont-Valin, and the municipalities of Sainte-Rose-du-Nord and Saint-Fulgence, and its territory in the borough of Chicoutimi to Chicoutimi—Le Fjord; loses La Marche, Labrecque, Saint-Nazaire, Bégin, Saint-David-de-Falardeau, Saint-Ambroise, Saint-Charles-de-Bourget, and Saint-Honoré to Lac-Saint-Jean
- La Pointe-de-l'Île: No changes
- La Prairie—Atateken: Replaces La Prairie; gains a small piece of territory north of Autoroute 30 in Saint-Isidore and a small piece of territory near Ch. St-Bernard in Châteauguay from Châteauguay—Lacolle
- Lac-Saint-Jean: Loses the city of Alma to Jonquière—Alma; gains La Marche, Labrecque, Saint-Nazaire, Bégin, Saint-David-de-Falardeau, Saint-Ambroise, Saint-Charles-de-Bourget, and Saint-Honoré from Jonquière—Alma
- Lac-Saint-Louis: No change
- LaSalle—Verdun: Replaces LaSalle—Émard—Verdun; gains area east of Av. 90e East and south of Rue Airlie from Dorval—Lachine
- Laurentides—Labelle: Gains the municipalities of Saint-Donat and Notre-Dame-de-la-Merci from Joliette; loses all of its territory in the MRC of Les Pays-d'en-Haut to the new riding of Les Pays-d'en-Haut
- Laurier—Sainte-Marie: Loses the territory south of Av. Christophe-Colombe and west of Rue Rachel to Outremont; gains territory north of Boul. Robert-Bourassa and east of Av. Viger (including Saint Helen's Island and Notre Dame Island) from Ville-Marie—Le Sud-Ouest—Île-des-Soeurs
- Laval—Les Îles: No change
- Les Pays-d'en-Haut: New riding; takes the municipalities of Wentworth-Nord, Lac-des-Seize-Îles, Wentworth, Saint-Adolphe-d'Howard, Morin-Heights, Mille-Isles and Gore from Argenteuil—La Petite-Nation; takes Saint-Colomban from Mirabel; takes the municipalities of Sainte-Anne-des-Lacs, Saint-Sauveur, Piedmont, Sainte-Adèle, Sainte-Marguerite-du-Lac-Masson and Estérel from Laurentides—Labelle; takes Prévost and Saint-Hippolyte from Rivière-du-Nord; takes Saint-Calixte from Montcalm; takes Entrelacs and Chertsey from Joliette
- Lévis—Lotbinière: Gains area west of 4e Av. and Rue St-Eustache in Lévis from Bellechasse—Les Etchemins—Lévis; loses Leclercville and Val-Alain to Bécancour—Saurel—Odanak; loses the municipalities of Lotbinère, Saint-Croix, Saint-Édouard-de-Lotbinière, Notre-Dame-du-Sacré-Coeur-d'Issoudun, Saint-Janvier-de-Joly, Laurier-Station, Saint-Flavien, Dosquet, and Sainte-Agathe-de-Lotbinière to Mégantic—L'Érable
- Longueuil—Charles-LeMoyne: No change
- Longueuil—Saint-Hubert: No change
- Louis-Hébert: Loses the area east of Av. Maguire to Québec Centre
- Louis-Saint-Laurent—Akiawenhrahk: Replaces Louis-Saint-Laurent; loses territory to Charlesbourg—Haute-Saint-Charles east of the following line: Boul. Val-Cartier to Rue de la Rivière-Nelson, Rivière Saint-Charles, the eastern limits of the Wendake Indian Reserve, Boul. Bastien, Boul. Pierre-Bertrand
- Marc-Aurèle-Fortin: No change
- Mégantic—L'Érable: Gains Weedon, Lingwick and Scotstown from Compton—Stanstead; loses Villeroy to Bécancour—Saurel—Odanak; gains the municipalities of Lotbinère, Saint-Croix, Saint-Édouard-de-Lotbinière, Notre-Dame-du-Sacré-Coeur-d'Issoudun, Saint-Janvier-de-Joly, Laurier-Station, Saint-Flavien, Dosquet, and Sainte-Agathe-de-Lotbinière from Lévis—Lotbinière
- Mirabel: Loses Saint-Colomban to Les Pays-d'en-Haut; gains the territory west of Montée Laurin, south of Ch. de la Rivière-Sud and west of Boul. Industriel in Saint-Eustache from Rivière-des-Mille-Îles; loses Sainte-Anne-des-Plaines to Rivière-du-Nord
- Mount Royal: Gains the territory south of Boul. Décaire and west of Ch. Côte-Saint-Luc from Notre-Dame-de-Grâce—Westmount
- Montarville: Gains Carignan from Beloeil—Chambly
- Montcalm: Loses Saint-Calixte to Les Pays-d'en-Haut
- Montmagny—Témiscouata—Kataskomiq: Largely replaces Montmagny—L'Islet—Kamouraska—Rivière-du-Loup; gains the MRC of Témiscouata from Rimouski-Neigette—Témiscouata—Les Basques
- Montmorency—Charlevoix: Largely replaces Beauport—Côte-de-Beaupré—Île d'Orléans—Charlevoix; loses the Chutes-Montmorency area to Beauport—Limoilou; gains the territory east of Ch. de Château-Bigot and Av. du Bourg-Royal and north of Boul. Louis-XIV from Charlesbourg—Haute-Saint-Charles; gains the municipalities of Lac-Beauport and Sainte-Brigitte-de-Laval from Portneuf—Jacques-Cartier
- Notre-Dame-de-Grâce—Westmount: Loses the territory south of Boul. Décaire and west of Ch. Côte-Saint-Luc to Mount Royal; gains the territory west of Rue Notre-Dame and Av. Atwater from Ville-Marie—Le Sud-Ouest—Île-des-Sœurs
- Outremont: Gains the territory south of Av. Christophe-Colombe and west of Rue Rachel from Laurier—Sainte-Marie
- Papineau: No change
- Pierre-Boucher—Les Patriotes—Verchères: No change
- Pierrefonds—Dollard: No change
- Pontiac—Kitigan Zibi: Replaces Pontiac; loses Val-des-Monts to Argenteuil—La Petite-Nation; loses that part of the City of Gatineau west of Montée Paiement to the riding of Gatineau; gains the rest of the Plateau neighbourhood from Hull—Aylmer
- Portneuf—Jacques-Cartier: Loses the municipalities of Lac-Beauport and Sainte-Brigitte-de-Laval to Montmorency—Charlevoix
- Québec Centre: Replaces Québec; gains the area east of Av. Maguire from Louis-Hébert
- Repentigny: Loses the Domaine-Ouellet area to Joliette—Manawan; loses Saint-Sulpice to Berthier—Maskinongé
- Richmond—Arthabaska: No change
- Rimouski—La Matapédia: Merger of the Rimouski-Neigette—Témiscouata—Les Basques and Avignon—La Mitis—Matane—Matapédia districts; takes the MRCs of Les Basuqes and Rimouski-Neigette from Rimouski-Neigette—Témiscouata—Les Basques; takes the MRCs of La Mitis and Matapédia from Avignon—La Mitis—Matane—Matapédia
- Rivière-des-Mille-Îles: Loses the territory west of Montée Laurin, south of Ch. de la Rivière-Sud and west of Boul. Industriel in Saint-Eustache to Mirabel
- Rivière-du-Nord: Gains Sainte-Anne-des-Plaines from Mirabel; loses the municipalities of Prévost and Saint-Hippolyte to Les Pays-d'en-Haut
- Rosemont—La Petite-Patrie: No change
- Saint-Hyacinthe—Bagot—Acton. New name for Saint-Hyacinthe—Bagot. No other changes
- Saint-Jean: No change
- Saint-Laurent: Gains the territory south of Boul. Acadie and east of Boul. Henri-Bourassa from Ahuntsic-Cartierville
- Saint-Léonard—Saint-Michel: Loses the territory north of Boul. Langelier and west of Rue Bombardier to Honoré-Mercier; boundary with Hochelaga along Rue Bélanger moved to the borough boundary between Rosemont—La-Petite-Patrie and Saint-Léonard
- Saint-Maurice—Champlain
- Shefford: No change
- Sherbrooke: Loses the Parc-Belvédère area to Compton—Stanstead
- Terrebonne: Loses area west of Boul. des Laurentides to Thérèse-De Blainville
- Thérèse-De Blainville: Gains area west of Boul. des Laurentides from Terrebonne
- Trois-Rivières: No change
- Vaudreuil: Largely replaces Vaudreuil—Soulanges; loses Les Cèdres and Pointe-des-Cascades to Beauharnois—Soulanges
- Ville-Marie—Le Sud-Ouest—Île-des-Sœurs: Loses the territory north of Boul. Robert-Bourassa and east of Av. Viger (including Saint Helen's Island and Notre Dame Island) to Laurier—Sainte-Marie; loses the territory west of Rue Notre-Dame and Av. Atwater to Notre-Dame-de-Grâce—Westmount
- Vimy: Loses the territory east of Boul. des Laurentides to Alfred-Pellan.

=== Saskatchewan ===
On December 6, 2022, the Federal Electoral Boundaries Commission for Saskatchewan released their final report, submitting to the House of Commons the following ridings:

- Battlefords—Lloydminster—Meadow Lake: Replaces Battlefords—Lloydminster; gains the Beaver Lake, Spiritwood, Meadow Lake, Loon Lake and the remainder of the Medstead Rural Municipalities, including enclosed Indian Reserves, Villages and the City of Meadow Lake from Desnethé—Missinippi—Churchill River; loses the Rural Municipalities of Eye Hill, Grass Lake, Tramping Lake, Reford, Rosemount, Heart's Hill, Progress, Mariposa, Grandview, Antelope Park, Prairiedale, Oakdale, Winslow and all enclosed towns and villages in those RMs to Swift Current—Grasslands—Kindersley
- Carlton Trail—Eagle Creek: Gains the Rural Municipalities of St. Louis, Invergordon, and Flett's Springs, including the One Arrow 95 Indian Reserve, and the villages of St. Louis and Beatty from Prince Albert; gains the Rural Municipality of Lake Lenore and the Town of St. Brieux from Yorkton—Melville; gains the Humboldt Lake area, the Rural Municipality of Blucher, and the municipalities of Allan, Bradwell and Clavet from Moose Jaw—Lake Centre—Lanigan; gains the remainder of the Rural Municipality of Corman Park in the riding of Saskatoon—Grasswood; loses the Rural Municipalities of Biggar, Perdue, Mountain View, Marriott, Harris, Montrose, Pleasant Valley, St. Andrews, Milden and Fertile Valley, including all enclosed towns and villages to Swift Current—Grasslands—Kindersley; loses newly annexed territory by the City of Saskatoon to Saskatoon West, but also gains all of Saskatoon West not in the City of Saskatoon
- Desnethé—Missinippi—Churchill River: Loses the Beaver Lake, Spiritwood, Meadow Lake, Loon Lake and the remainder of the Medstead Rural Municipalities, including enclosed Indian Reserves, Villages and the City of Meadow Lake to Battlefords—Lloydminster—Meadow Lake; loses the Rural Municipalities of Big River, Canwood, Lakeland, plus Prince Albert National Park, and the remainder of the Rural Municipalities of Leask, Shellbrook, Paddowckwood and Torchwood, plus all enclosed and partially enclosed Indian Reserves, Towns and Villages to Prince Albert
- Moose Jaw—Lake Centre—Lanigan: Gains the remainder of the Rural Municipality of Prairie Rose from Regina—Qu'Appelle; gains the Rural Municipalities of Maple Bush, Enfield, Chaplin, Wheatlands, Caron, Shamrock, Rodgers, Hillsborough, Gravelbourg, Sutton, and Lake Johnston plus all enclosed towns and villages from Cypress Hills—Grasslands; loses the Humboldt Lake area, the Rural Municipality of Blucher, and the municipalities of Allan, Bradwell and Clavet to Carlton Trail—Eagle Creek; loses all newly annexed territory by the City of Regina to Regina—Lewvan (west of McCarthy Blvd) or Regina—Qu'Appelle (east of McCarthy); gains the parts of Regina—Lewvan and Regina—Wascana (south of Highway 33) not in the City of Regina
- Prince Albert: Gains the Rural Municipalities of Big River, Canwood, Lakeland, plus Prince Albert National Park, and the remainder of the Rural Municipalities of Leask, Shellbrook, Paddowckwood and Torchwood, plus all enclosed and partially enclosed Indian Reserves, Towns and Villages from Desnethé—Missinippi—Churchill River; loses the Rural Municipalities of Arborfield and Moose Range, and the municipalities of Tobin Lake, Carrot River and Arborfield to Yorkton—Melville; loses the Rural Municipalities of St. Louis, Invergordon, and Flett's Springs, including the One Arrow 95 Indian Reserve, and the villages of St. Louis and Beatty to Carlton Trail—Eagle Creek
- Regina—Lewvan: Gains the area south of 4th Avenue and West of Albert Street in Regina from Regina—Qu'Appelle; loses all of the City of Regina north of 1st Avenue and east of McCarthy Blvd to Regina—Qu'Appelle; gains all newly annexed territory by the City of Regina west of McCarthy Blvd from Moose Jaw—Lake Centre—Lanigan; loses the parts not in the City of Regina to Moose Jaw—Lake Centre—Lanigan
- Regina—Qu'Appelle: Loses the remainder of the Rural Municipality of Prairie Rose to Moose Jaw—Lake Centre—Lanigan; loses the Rural Municipalities of Big Quill, Elfros and Ituna Bon Accord plus all enclosed Indian Reserves, towns and villages to Yorkton—Melville; loses the area south of 4th Avenue and West of Albert Street in Regina to Regina—Lewvan; gains all of the City of Regina north of 1st Avenue and east of McCarthy Blvd from Regina—Lewvan and Moose Jaw—Lake Centre—Lanigan; loses all newly annexed territory in the city of Regina south of the CP Railway to Regina—Wascana; gains that part of Regina—Wascana between Highways 1 and 33 not in the City of Regina
- Regina—Wascana: Loses all of its territory outside the City of Regina to either Moose Jaw—Lake Centre—Lanigan (west of Highway 33) or Regina—Qu'Appelle (east of Highway 33); gains newly annexed territory in the City of Regina from Regina—Qu'Appelle north of Highway 1
- Saskatoon South: Replaces Saskatoon—Grasswood; loses all of its territory outside of the City of Saskatoon to Carlton Trail—Eagle Creek; loses the area north of 8th Street and west of Highway 11 to Saskatoon—University
- Saskatoon—University: Gains that part of Saskatoon—Grasswood north of 8th Street and west of Highway 11
- Saskatoon West: Western border reconfigured to follow the new Saskatoon city limits
- Souris—Moose Mountain: Gains the Rural Municipalities of Stonehenge, Lake of the Rivers, Willow Bunch, Old Post and Poplar Valley, and all enclosed towns and villages from Cypress Hills—Grasslands
- Swift Current—Grasslands—Kindersley: Replaces Cypress Hills—Grasslands; loses the Rural Municipalities of Stonehenge, Lake of the Rivers, Willow Bunch, Old Post and Poplar Valley, and all enclosed towns and villages to Souris—Moose Mountain; loses the Rural Municipalities of Maple Bush, Enfield, Chaplin, Wheatlands, Caron, Shamrock, Rodgers, Hillsborough, Gravelbourg, Sutton, and Lake Johnston plus all enclosed towns and villages to Moose Jaw—Lake Centre—Lanigan; gains the Rural Municipalities of Eye Hill, Grass Lake, Tramping Lake, Reford, Rosemount, Heart's Hill, Progress, Mariposa, Grandview, Antelope Park, Prairiedale, Oakdale, Winslow and all enclosed towns and villages in those RMs from Battlefords—Lloydminster; gainsthe Rural Municipalities of Biggar, Perdue, Mountain View, Marriott, Harris, Montrose, Pleasant Valley, St. Andrews, Milden and Fertile Valley, including all enclosed towns and villages from Carlton Trail—Eagle Creek
- Yorkton—Melville: Loses the Rural Municipality of Lake Lenore and the Town of St. Brieux to Carlton Trail—Eagle Creek; gains the Rural Municipalities of Arborfield and Moose Range, and the municipalities of Tobin Lake, Carrot River and Arborfield from Prince Albert; gains the Rural Municipalities of Big Quill, Elfros and Ituna Bon Accord plus all enclosed Indian Reserves, towns and villages from Regina—Qu'Appelle.

== Objections from MPs ==
After the publication of each commission's final report, the reports were referred to the House of Commons Standing Committee on Procedure and House Affairs. MPs could file written objections to a report with the standing committee within 30 days of the tabling of the final report. Members had to specify the provisions objected to in the reports and the reasons for their objection, and objections had to be signed by at least 10 MPs.

After the filling deadline, the standing committee had 30 days to consider the objections, with a 30-day extension available, after which the reports along with a copy of all the objections, including those the committee did not support, were returned to the commissions through the speaker of the House of Commons.

The commissions had to consider the objections within the following 30 days, but they were not compelled to make any changes as a result of the objections.

=== New Brunswick ===
- Conservative MP John Williamson objected to the name "Saint John—St. Croix", and proposed instead the name "New Brunswick Southwest". The standing committee supported the objection. The Federal Electoral Boundaries Commission for New Brunswick dismissed the objection.

The standing committee completed its consideration of the New Brunswick Final Report on February 16, 2023, and reported the objection back to the House of Commons on March 20, 2023.

=== Newfoundland and Labrador ===
There were no MP objections to the Newfoundland and Labrador Final Report.

The standing committee completed its consideration of the Newfoundland and Labrador Final Report on January 31, 2023, and reported the lack of objections back to the House of Commons on February 8, 2023.

=== Nova Scotia ===
- Liberal MP Sean Fraser objected to the division of Antigonish County and Pictou County into separate electoral districts (Cape Breton—Canso—Antigonish and Pictou—Eastern Shore respectively), objected to the inclusion of Antigonish County in Cape Breton—Canso, and objected to the inclusion of Lawrencetown, Porters Lake and Chezzetcook in Pictou—Eastern Shore. The standing committee supported the objection, with the four Conservative members of the committee dissenting.
- Liberal MP Sean Fraser objected to the name "Pictou—Eastern Shore" and proposed instead the name "Central Nova". The standing committee supported the objection.
- Liberal MP Jaime Battiste objected to the territory exchange between Cape Breton—Canso and Sydney—Victoria. The standing committee supported the objection, with the four Conservative members of the committee dissenting.
- Liberal MP Lena Diab objected to the removal of the area around Larry Uteck Boulevard from Halifax West and objected to the inclusion of the Chebucto Peninsula in Halifax West. The standing committee supported the objection, with the four Conservative members of the committee dissenting.

The Federal Electoral Boundaries Commission for Nova Scotia dismissed all four objections.

The standing committee completed its consideration of the Nova Scotia Final Report on February 14, 2023, and reported the objections back to the House of Commons on March 20, 2023.

=== Prince Edward Island ===
There were no MP objections to the Prince Edward Island Final Report.

The standing committee completed its consideration of the Prince Edward Island Final Report on January 31, 2023, and reported the lack of objections back to the House of Commons on February 8, 2023.

=== Manitoba ===
- New Democratic MP Niki Ashton and Conservative MP James Bezan jointly objected to the removal of Little Saskatchewan First Nation and part of Lake St. Martin First Nation from Churchill—Keewatinook Aski. The standing committee supported the objection. The Commission accepted the objection.
- New Democratic MP Daniel Blaikie objected to the inclusion of Navin, Norcan and Dugald in Elmwood—Transcona. The standing committee supported the objection, with the four Conservative members of the committee dissenting. The Commission dismissed the objection.

The standing committee completed its consideration of the Manitoba Final Report on February 16, 2023, and reported the objections back to the House of Commons on March 20, 2023.

=== Saskatchewan ===
- New Democratic MP Daniel Blaikie objected to the boundaries in Saskatoon, and proposed instead that the commission restore to the proposed "Saskatoon Centre" from the initial proposal. The standing committee supported the objection, with the four Conservative members of the committee dissenting. The Federal Electoral Boundaries Commission for Saskatchewan dismissed the objection.
- Conservative MPs Warren Steinley and Andrew Scheer jointly objected to the territory exchange between Regina—Lewvan and Regina—Qu'Appelle. The standing committee supported the objection. The Commission accepted the objection.
- Scheer also objected to the removal of Wynyard and Ituna from Regina—Qu'Appelle. The standing committee supported the objection. The Commission accepted the objection.

The standing committee completed its consideration of the Saskatchewan Final Report on February 16, 2023, and reported the objections back to the House of Commons on March 20, 2023.

== Submissions to the House of Commons ==
=== Alberta ===
On July 20, 2023, the Federal Electoral Boundaries Commission for Alberta completed its work, with the final report as submitted to the House of Commons being considered final.

- Airdrie—Cochrane: Carved out of Banff—Airdrie. Consists of Airdie, Cochrane and the central part of Rocky View County
- Battle River—Crowfoot: Gains the remainder of Kneehill County, including the villages of Linden, Acme and Carbon from Bow River; loses all of its territory in Leduc County to Leduc—Wetaskiwin
- Bow River: Loses all of its territory in Kneehill County, including the villages of Linden, Acme and Carbon to Battle River—Crowfoot; loses all of its territory west of Highways 23 and Highway 24 in Vulcan County, including all of the Town of Vulcan to Foothills; gains a bit of area in Rocky View County east of Airdrie from Banff—Airdrie
- Calgary Centre: Loses the neighbourhoods of Lincoln Park, Rutland Park, CFB Currie and that part of Richmond west of Crowchild Trail and south of Richmond Road and all of its territory in Shaganappi and Rosscarrock to Calgary Signal Hill
- Calgary Confederation: Loses the neighbourhoods of Dalhousie, Highland Park, Highwood, Queens Park Village and Greemview to Calgary Nose Hill; gains the neighbourhoods of Bowness and Greenwood/Greenbriar from Calgary Signal Hill
- Calgary Crowfoot: Largely replaces Calgary Rocky Ridge; loses the neighbourhood of Kincora to Calgary Nose Hill, and the neighbourhoods of Evanston and Sage Hill east of Symons Valley Rd to Calgary Skyview
- Calgary East: New riding created out of Calgary Forest Lawn south of 16 Ave NE plus part of Vista Heights; and that part of Calgary Shepard north of a line following 130 Ave SE to 52 St SE to Glenmore Trail
- Calgary Heritage: Loses the neighbourhood of Kingsland to Calgary Midnapore; gains the neighbourhoods of Millrise and Shawnessy from Calgary Midnapore
- Calgary McKnight: New riding created out of Calgary Forest Lawn north of 16 Ave NE excluding part of Vista Heights; and that part of Calgary Skyview south of a line following Deerfoot Trail NE to Country Hills Blvd. NE to Metis Trail NE to 96 Ave NE to 68 St NE to 80 Ave NE
- Calgary Midnapore: Gains the neighbourhood of Kingsland from Calgary Heritage; loses the neighbourhoods of Millrise and Shawnessy to Calgary Heritage
- Calgary Nose Hill: Gains the neighbourhoods of Dalhousie, Highland Park, Highwood, Queens Park Village and Greemview from Calgary Confederation; gains the neighbourhood of Kincora from Calgary Rocky Ridge; loses the neighbourhood of Panorama Hills to Calgary Skyview; gains the neighbourhood of Harvest Hills from Calgary Skyview
- Calgary Shepard: Loses all of its territory north of a line following 130 Ave SE to 52 St SE to Glenmore Trail to Calgary East
- Calgary Signal Hill: Gains the neighbourhoods of Lincoln Park, Rutland Park, CFB Currie, Shaganappi, Rosscarrock and that part of Richmond west of Crowchild Trail and south of Richmond Road from Calgary Centre; loses the neighbourhoods of Bowness and Greenwood/Greenbriar to Calgary Confederation
- Calgary Skyview: Loses all of its territory south of a line following Deerfoot Trail NE to Country Hills Blvd. NE to Metis Trail NE to 96 Ave NE to 68 St NE to 80 Ave NE to Calgary McKnight; loses the neighbourhood of Harvest Hills to Calgary Nose Hill; gains the neighbourhood of Panorama Hills from Calgary Nose Hill; gains the neighbourhoods of Evanston and Sage Hill east of Symons Valley Rd from Calgary Rocky Ridge
- Edmonton Centre: Gains the neighbourhoods of Athlone, Kensington and Calder from Edmonton Griesbach; loses the remainder of the neighbourhood of McCauley to Edmonton Griesbach; loses all of its territory south of the Mackenzie Ravine to 95 Ave to Edmonton West; gains the neighbourhoods of Glenwood, Britannia Youngstown and Mayfield from Edmonton West
- Edmonton Gateway: New riding; consists of Edmonton Mill Woods west of 66 St (except for the area north of 34 Ave and west of 99 St); Edmonton Riverbend east of 111 St (except the neighbourhood of Twin Brooks); and the neighbourhoods of Rutherford, Blackmud Creek, Cashman, Cavanagh, Callaghan, Allard, Desrochers, Ellerslie, Summerside, The Orchards at Ellerslie, and the southern half of Walker from Edmonton—Wetaskiwin
- Edmonton Griesbach: Gains the neighbourhoods of Eaux Claires, Belle Rive and Mayliewan from Edmonton Manning; gains the neighbourhood of Riverdale from Edmonton Strathcona; gains the remainder of McCauley from Edmonton Centre; loses the neighbourhoods of Athlone, Kensington and Calder to Edmonton Centre; loses the neighbourhood of Wellington to Edmonton Northwest
- Edmonton Manning: Loses the neighbourhoods of Lorelei and Beaumaris to Edmonton Northwest; loses the neighbourhoods of Eaux Claires, Belle Rive and Mayliewan to Edmonton Griesbach
- Edmonton Northwest: New riding, consisting mostly of the Edmonton portions of St. Albert—Edmonton, plus the neighbourhoods of Lorelei and Beaumaris from Edmonton Manning; Wellington from Edmonton Griesbach; and that part of Edmonton West north of a line following Whitemud Dr to Anthony Henday Dr to 87 Av to 178 St to 95 Av, to 170 St to Mayfield Rd to 111 Av
- Edmonton Riverbend: Loses the neighbourhoods of Aspen Gardens, Royal Gardens, Rideau Park and Duggan to Edmonton Strathcona; loses the area east of 111 St (except the neighbourhood of Twin Brooks) to Edmonton Gateway; gains the neighbourhoods of Kewsiwck, the remainder of Ambleside, Glenridding Heights, Glenridding Ravine, Hays Ridge, Graydon Hill, Paisley, and Chappelle and everything in Edmonton south of those neighbourhoods and west of the Queen Elizabeth Highway in Edmonton—Wetaskiwin; loses the neighbourhood of Windermere to Edmonton West
- Edmonton Southeast: Largely replaces Edmonton Mill Woods; loses the area west of 66 St to Edmonton Gateway (except for the area north of 34 Ave and west of 99 St which is being transferred to Edmonton Strathcona); gains the neighbourhoods of Charlesworth and the northern half of Walker plus the rural south-eastern part of the city from Edmonton—Wetaskiwin
- Edmonton Strathcona: Loses the neighbourhood of Riverdale to Edmonton Griesbach; gains the neighbourhoods of Aspen Gardens, Royal Gardens, Rideau Park and Duggan from Edmonton Riverbend; gains the area north of 34 Ave and west of 99 St from Edmonton Mill Woods
- Edmonton West: Gains the neighbourhood of Windermere from Edmonton Riverbend; loses the area north of a line following Whitemud Dr to Anthony Henday Dr to 87 Av to 178 St to 95 Av, to 170 St to Mayfield Rd to 111 Av. to Edmonton Northwest; loses the neighbourhoods of Glenwood, Britannia Youngstown and Mayfield to Edmonton Centre; gains all of Edmonton Centre south of the Mackenzie Ravine to 95 Ave
- Foothills: Loses remainder of Kananaskis and Rocky View County (except Bragg Creek area) to Yellowhead; gains territory west of Highways 23 and Highway 24 in Vulcan County, including all of the Town of Vulcan from Bow River; gains Blood 148 and Blood 148A Indian Reserves plus the remainder of Improvement District No. 4 Waterton from Medicine Hat—Cardston—Warner
- Fort McMurray—Cold Lake: Gains area north of Highway 659 and east of Durlingville from Lakeland
- Grande Prairie: Replaces Grande Prairie—Mackenzie; loses the remainder of Mackenzie County including the communities of Rainbow Lake, Hay Lake 209, Upper Hay River 212, High Level and Bushe River 207 to Peace River—Westlock
- Lakeland: Loses area north of Highway 659 and east of Durlingville to Fort McMurray—Cold Lake
- Leduc—Wetaskiwin: New district mostly containing the non-Edmonton parts of Edmonton—Wetaskiwin, but contains all of Leduc County (including Warburg and Thorsby), and all of the Indian Reserves between Wetaskiwin and Ponoka
- Lethbridge: No changes.
- Medicine Hat—Cardston—Warner: Loses Blood 148 and Blood 148A Indian Reserves plus the remainder of Improvement District No. 4 Waterton to Foothills
- Parkland: New district based in the western exurbs of Edmonton. Includes all of Parkland County including Spruce Grove, Stony Plain, Spring Lake; Brazeau County including Drayton Valley and Breton; the eastern part of Yellowhead County around Chip Lake and the part of Lac Ste. Anne County around Mayerthorpe
- Peace River—Westlock: Gains the remainder of Mackenzie County including the communities of Rainbow Lake, Hay Lake 209, Upper Hay River 212, High Level and Bushe River 207 from Grande Prairie—Mackenzie.
- Ponoka—Didsbury: New district created from much of the rural areas of the two Red Deer based ridings. Contains Ponoka County, Lacombe County, and the municipalities they surround, the western half of Red Deer County including Innisfail and Bowden and the northeastern half of Mountain View County including Olds and Didsbury
- Red Deer: New district. Contains Red Deer and the eastern half of Red Deer County including Penhold, Delburne and Elnora
- Sherwood Park—Fort Saskatchewan: No changes.
- St. Albert—Sturgeon River: New district. Contains St. Albert, Sturgeon County and the municipalities it surrounds, and most of Lac Ste. Anne County and the municipalities it surrounds except for the Mayerthorpe area.
- Yellowhead: A major reconfiguration of the present district. Gains the Sundre, Cremona and Carstairs areas from Red Deer—Mountain View; Gains most of the district of Banff—Airdrie except for the Airdrie and Cochrane areas; Gains part of Rocky View County (around Pirmez Creek) and the remainder of the Kananaskis Improvement District from Foothills. Loses all of its territory in Parkland County, Lac Ste. Anne County, Brazeau County, Leduc County and surrounded municipalities, plus that part of Yellowhead County in the Chip Lake area to Parkland, St. Albert—Sturgeon River, and Leduc—Wetaskiwin.

=== British Columbia ===
On July 20, 2023, the Federal Electoral Boundaries Commission for British Columbia completed its work, with the final report as submitted to the House of Commons being considered final.

- Abbotsford—South Langley: New district. Carved out of Abbotsford west of Highway 11 and the communities of Brookswood, Fern Ridge, Aldergrove and the rural southern part of Langley Township plus the and Matsqui 4 Indian Reserve from Langley—Aldergrove.
- Burnaby Central: Mostly replaces Burnaby South. Gains the Sullivan Heights area as far west as Arden Avenue from Burnaby North—Seymour. Gains that part of Burnaby west of Canada Way and north of the Kingsway Highway from New Westminster—Burnaby. Loses all of Burnaby south of both Imperial Street and Kingsway Highway to Vancouver Fraserview—South Burnaby.
- Burnaby North—Seymour: Gains the Lynn Valley and Lynmour areas from North Vancouver. Loses the Sullivan Heights area as far west as Arden Avenue to Burnaby Central.
- Cariboo—Prince George: Gains the regional district electoral areas of Cariboo G, Cariboo H and Cariboo L, the District Municipality of One Hundred Mile House, and the Indian Reserves of Canim Lake 1, Canim Lake 2, Canim Lake 4 and Windy Mouth 7 from Kamloops—Thompson—Cariboo. Loses the area northeast of the Cariboo Highway and west of the Fraser River (South Fort George area) to Prince George—Peace River—Northern Rockies.
- Chilliwack—Hope: Gains most of the District Municipality of Kent (Agassiz and points eastward), the regional district electoral area of Fraser Valley A and the remainder of Fraser Valley B, and the Indian Reserves of Albert Flat 5, Boothroyd 13, Boston Bar 1A, Bucktum 4, Chawathil 4, Inkahtsaph 6, Kahmoose 4, Kopchitchin 2, Lukseetsissum 9, Puckatholetchin 11, Ruby Creek 2, Saddle Rock 9, Seabird Island, Skawahlook 1, Speyum 3, Spuzzum 1, Stullawheets 8, Tseatah 2, Tuckkwiowhum 1, and Yale Town 1 from Mission—Matsqui—Fraser Canyon.
- Cloverdale—Langley City: Loses all of its territory in Langley Township to Langley Township—Fraser Heights. Loses the area south of 64 Ave and west of 146 Street to Surrey Newton. Loses all of its territory north of 80 Avenue to Fleetwood—Port Kells.
- Columbia—Kootenay—Southern Rockies: Replaces Kootenay—Columbia. Gains Fruitvale, Montrose, Trail, the regional district electoral area of Kootenay Boundary A and that part of Kootenay Boundary B / Lower Columbia-Old-Glory southeast of Trail from South Okanagan—West Kootenay. Loses Golden, Revelstoke and the regional district electoral areas of Columbia Shuswap A and Columbia-Shuswap B to Kamloops—Shuswap—Central Rockies.
- Coquitlam—Port Coquitlam: Loses the Eagle Ridge area and the western half of the Westwood Plateau to Port Moody—Coquitlam.
- Courtenay—Alberni: Gains Lantzville, the Indian Reserve of Nanoose, and the Dover area of Nanaimo from Nanaimo—Ladysmith. Loses all of its territory east of the Courtenay River to North Island—Powell River.
- Cowichan—Malahat—Langford: Gains the remainder of Langford and all of the area west of the Jordan River from Esquimalt—Saanich—Sooke.
- Delta: Gains that part of Surrey—Newton south of 64 Ave and west of 126 Street and the Mud Bay area from South Surrey—White Rock.
- Esquimalt—Saanich—Sooke: Loses the remainder of Langford and all of the area west of the Jordan River to Cowichan—Malahat—Langford. Loses the area around Elk Lake / Beaver Lake to Saanich—Gulf Islands.
- Fleetwood—Port Kells: Gains all of Cloverdale—Langley City north of 80 Avenue. Gains all of Surrey Centre south of 108 Avenue and east of 148 Street. Loses all of its territory north of the Trans-Canada Highway to Langley Township—Fraser Heights.
- Kamloops—Shuswap—Central Rockies: New district created out of Kamloops—Thompson—Cariboo, Kootenay—Columbia and North Okanagan—Shuswap. Consists of the southeastern third of Kamloops, the northern half of Spallumcheen, the municipalities of Armstrong, Chase, Enderby, Golden, Revelstoke, Salmon Arm, Sicamous, the regional district electoral areas of Columbia Shuswap A, Columbia Shuswap B, Columbia Shuswap C, Columbia Shuswap D, Columbia Shuswap E, Columbia Shuswap F, North Okanagan F, Thompson-Nicola L (Grasslands), a small part of Thompson-Nicola P (Rivers and the Peaks) around Adams Lake, and the Indian Reserves Chum Creek 2, Enderby 2, Hustalen 1, Neskonlith, North Bay 5, Okanagan (Part) 1, Quaaout 1, Sahhaltkum 4, Salmon River 1, Scotch Creek 4, Stequmwhulpa 5, Switsemalph and Switsemalph 3.
- Kamloops—Thompson—Nicola: Mostly replaces Kamloops—Thompson—Cariboo. Gains Logan Lake, Merritt, the regional district electoral areas of Thompson-Nicola M (Beautiful Nicola Valley – North) and Thompson-Nicola N (Beautiful Nicola Valley – South), and the Indian Reserves of Coldwater 1, Douglas Lake 3, Joeyaska 2, Nicola Lake 1, Nicola Mameet 1, Nooaitch 10, Paul's Basin 2 and Zoht 4 from Central Okanagan—Similkameen—Nicola. Gains the regional district electoral areas of Squamish-Lillooet A, Squamish-Lillooet B, Thompson-Nicola I (Blue Sky Country) and all enclosed municipalities and Indian Reserves from Mission—Matsqui—Fraser Canyon. Loses the southeastern third of Kamloops and the remainder of Thompson-Nicola L (Grasslands) to Kamloops—Shuswap—Central Rockies.
- Kelowna: Mostly replaces Kelowna—Lake Country. Gains the non coastal part of Kelowna from Central Okanagan—Similkameen—Nicola; Gains the northern half of the Kootenay Boundary E / West Boundary regional district electoral area from South Okanagan—West Kootenay. Loses the District Municipality of Lake Country, the Indian Reserve of Duck Lake 7, and the Central Okanagan regional district electoral area north of Highway 33 to Vernon—Lake Country—Monashee. Loses the Central Okanagan regional district electoral area south of Hydraulic Lake Road and Kelowna south of Mission Creek to Okanagan Lake West—South Kelowna.
- Langley Township—Fraser Heights: Largely replaces Langley—Aldergrove. Gains all of Fleetwood—Port Kells north of the Trans-Canada Highway. Gains all of Cloverdale—Langley City in Langley Township. Loses the communities of Brookswood, Fern Ridge, Aldergrove and the rural southern part of Langley Township plus the and Matsqui 4 Indian Reserve to Abbotsford—South Langley. Loses all of its territory in Abbotsford to Abbotsford—South Langley and Mission—Matsqui—Abbotsford.
- Mission—Matsqui—Abbotsford: Largely replaces Mission—Matsqui—Fraser Canyon. Gains all of Abbotsford east of Highway 11. Gains that part of the City of Abbotsford north of the Trans-Canada Highway located in Langley—Aldergrove. Loses the rural parts of north and west Mission to Pitt Meadows—Maple Ridge. Loses most of the District Municipality of Kent (Agassiz and points eastward), the regional district electoral area of Fraser Valley A and the remainder of Fraser Valley B, and the Indian Reserves of Albert Flat 5, Boothroyd 13, Boston Bar 1A, Bucktum 4, Chawathil 4, Inkahtsaph 6, Kahmoose 4, Kopchitchin 2, Lukseetsissum 9, Puckatholetchin 11, Ruby Creek 2, Saddle Rock 9, Seabird Island, Skawahlook 1, Speyum 3, Spuzzum 1, Stullawheets 8, Tseatah 2, Tuckkwiowhum 1, and Yale Town 1 to Chilliwack—Hope.
- Nanaimo—Ladysmith: Loses Lantzville, the Indian Reserve of Nanoose, and the Dover area of Nanaimo to Courtenay—Alberni.
- New Westminster—Burnaby—Maillardville: Replaces New Westminster—Burnaby. Gains much of the Maillardville area from Port Moody—Coquitlam. Loses all of its territory in Burnaby west of Canada Way to either Burnaby Central or Vancouver Fraserview—South Burnaby.
- North Island—Powell River: Gains all of Courtenay—Alberni north of the Courtenay River.
- North Vancouver—Capilano: Replaces North Vancouver. Gains all of West Vancouver—Sunshine Coast—Sea to Sky Country south of the Trans-Canada Highway and east of 21 St. Loses the Lynn Valley and Lynmour areas to Burnaby North—Seymour.
- Okanagan Lake West—South Kelowna: New district. Carved out of Kelowna—Lake Country and Central Okanagan—Similkameen—Nicola. Consists of the southern third of Kelowna, plus the municipalities of Peachland, Summerland and West Kelowna, the Indian Reserves of Tsinstikeptum 9 and Tsinstikeptum 10, most of the Central Okanagan West regional district electoral area (excluding the Fintry area) and most of the Okanagan-Similkameen F regional district area (excluding the area south of Summerland).
- Pitt Meadows—Maple Ridge: Gains the rural parts of north and west Mission from Mission—Matsqui—Fraser Canyon.
- Port Moody—Coquitlam: Gains the Eagle Ridge area and the western half of the Westwood Plateau from Coquitlam—Port Coquitlam. Loses much of the Maillardville area to New Westminster—Burnaby—Maillardville.
- Prince George—Peace River—Northern Rockies: Gains that part of Cariboo—Prince George northeast of the Cariboo Highway and west of the Fraser River (South Fort George area)
- Richmond Centre—Marpole: Replaces Richmond Centre. Gains much of the Marpole area from Vancouver Granville and Vancouver Quadra. Loses the area south of Williams Road to Richmond East—Steveston.
- Richmond East—Steveston: Replaces Steveston—Richmond East. Gains the area south of Williams Road from Richmond Centre.
- Saanich—Gulf Islands: Gains the area around Elk Lake / Beaver Lake from Esquimalt—Saanich—Sooke.
- Similkameen—South Okanagan—West Kootenay: Replaces South Okanagan—West Kootenay. Gains Keremeos and Princeton, the Indian Reserves of Alexis 9, Ashnola 10, Blind Creek 6, Chopaka 7 & 8, Chuchuwayha 2 and Lower Similkameen 2 and the regional district electoral areas of Okanagan-Similkameen B, Okanagan-Similkameen G, Okanagan-Similkameen H, and the remainder of Okanagan-Similkameen I from Central Okanagan—Similkameen—Nicola. Loses the northern half of the Kootenay Boundary E / West Boundary regional district electoral area to Kelowna. Loses Fruitvale, Montrose, Trail, the regional district electoral area of Kootenay Boundary A and that part of Kootenay Boundary B / Lower Columbia-Old-Glory southeast of Trail to Columbia—Kootenay—Southern Rockies. Loses the regional district electoral area of Central Kootenay H and the remainder of Central Kootenay K, plus Nakusp, New Denver, Silverton and Slocan to Vernon—Lake Country—Monashee.
- Skeena—Bulkley Valley: No changes.
- South Surrey—White Rock: Loses the Mud Bay area to Delta.
- Surrey Centre: Loses the area south of 108 Avenue and east of 148 Street to Fleetwood—Port Kells.
- Surrey Newton: Renamed from Surrey—Newton. Loses the area south of 64 Ave and west of 126 Street to Delta.
- Vancouver Centre: Loses the area south of False Creek and west of Cambie Street to Vancouver Granville.
- Vancouver East: No changes.
- Vancouver Fraserview—South Burnaby: Mostly replaces Vancouver South. Loses the Sunset neighbourhood of Vancouver west of Fraser Street and north of 49th Avenue and points westward to Vancouver Granville and Vancouver Kingsway. Gains all of Burnaby south of both Imperial Street and Kingsway Highway from Burnaby South and New Westminster—Burnaby.
- Vancouver Granville: Gains the area south of False Creek and west of Cambie Street from Vancouver Centre; Gains the remainder of the Oakridge neighbourhood of Vancouver and everything south of 49th Avenue and east of Cambie from Vancouver South; Loses everything south of 57th Avenue and west of Cambie to Richmond Centre—Marpole; Loses everything west of Granville Street between 41st and 57th Avenue to Vancouver Quadra.
- Vancouver Kingsway: Gains that part of Vancouver South between Main Street and Knight Street and north of 49th Avenue.
- Vancouver Quadra: Gains everything west of Granville Street between 41st and 57th Avenue from Vancouver Granville. Loses everything east of Angus Drive to Richmond Centre—Marpole
- Vernon—Lake Country—Monashee: Largely replaces North Okanagan—Shuswap. Gains the Fintry area from Central Okanagan—Similkameen—Nicola. Gains the District Municipality of Lake Country, the Indian Reserve of Duck Lake 7, and the Central Okanagan regional district electoral area north of Highway 33 from Kelowna—Lake Country. Gains the regional district electoral area of Central Kootenay H and the remainder of Central Kootenay K, plus Nakusp, New Denver, Silverton and Slocan from South Okanagan—West Kootenay. Loses the northern half of Spallumcheen, the municipalities of Armstrong, Chase, Enderby, Salmon Arm, Sicamous, the regional district electoral areas of Columbia Shuswap C, Columbia Shuswap D, Columbia Shuswap E, Columbia Shuswap F, North Okanagan F, the remainder of Thompson-Nicola L (Grasslands), the remainder of Thompson-Nicola P (Rivers and the Peaks), and the Indian Reserves Chum Creek 2, Enderby 2, Hustalen 1, Neskonlith, North Bay 5, Okanagan (Part) 1, Quaaout 1, Sahhaltkum 4, Salmon River 1, Scotch Creek 4, Stequmwhulpa 5, Switsemalph and Switsemalph 3 to Kamloops—Shuswap—Central Rockies and Kamloops—Thompson—Nicola.
- Victoria: No changes.
- West Vancouver—Sunshine Coast—Sea to Sky Country: Loses the area south of the Trans-Canada Highway and east of 21 St to North Vancouver—Capilano.

=== Manitoba ===
On April 26, 2023, the Federal Electoral Boundaries Commission for Manitoba completed its work, with the final report as submitted to the House of Commons being considered final. Only one minor change was approved after the final report.

- Brandon—Souris: Gains Sioux Valley Dakota Nation plus the part of the Rural Municipality of Wallace – Woodworth that it exclaves, and the CFB Shilo area from Dauphin—Swan River—Neepawa; gains the Municipality of Pembina from Portage—Lisgar
- Churchill—Keewatinook Aski: Loses the Peonan Point area and gains the Little Saskatchewan 48 area from Selkirk—Interlake—Eastman
- Elmwood—Transcona: Loses area north of Leighton Avenue and west of Raleigh Street to Kildonan—St. Paul; gains the Navin, Norcan and Dugald areas from Provencher
- Kildonan—St. Paul: Loses the Winnipeg neighbourhood of Leila North to Winnipeg North; gains the area north of Leighton Avenue and west of Raleigh Street from Elmwood—Transcona; gains that part of the Rural Municipality of Springfield north of Springfield Road and west of Spruce Road (Oakbank area) from Provencher
- Portage—Lisgar: Loses the Municipality of Pembina to Brandon—Souris; loses the Municipality of Norfolk Treherne and the area around Long Plain 6 to Riding Mountain
- Provencher: Loses the Navin, Norcan and Dugald areas to Elmwood—Transcona; loses that part of the Rural Municipality of Springfield north of Springfield Road and west of Spruce Road (Oakbank area) to Kildonan—St. Paul
- Riding Mountain: Largely replaces Dauphin—Swan River—Neepawa; loses the Sioux Valley Dakota Nation plus the part of the Rural Municipality of Wallace – Woodworth that it exclaves, and the CFB Shilo area to Brandon—Souris; gains the Municipality of Norfolk Treherne and the area around Long Plain 6 from Portage—Lisgar
- Selkirk—Interlake—Eastman: Gains the Peonan Point area and loses the Little Saskatchewan 48 area from Churchill—Keewatinook Aski; loses the Rural Municipality of Rosser to Winnipeg West
- St. Boniface—St. Vital: Replaces Saint Boniface—Saint Vital; gains the neighbourhood of Minnetonka from Winnipeg South
- Winnipeg Centre: Gains the Winnipeg neighbourhoods of North Point Douglas, Lord Selkirk Park and the eastern half of Dufferin from Winnipeg North
- Winnipeg North: Loses the Winnipeg neighbourhoods of North Point Douglas, Lord Selkirk Park and the eastern half of Dufferin to Winnipeg Centre; gains the Winnipeg neighbourhood of Leila North from Kildonan—St. Paul
- Winnipeg South: Loses the Winnipeg neighbourhood of Minnetonka to St. Boniface—St. Vital; loses the Winnipeg neighbourhoods of Whyte Ridge and Linden Ridge to Winnipeg South Centre
- Winnipeg South Centre: Gains the Winnipeg neighbourhoods of Whyte Ridge and Linden Ridge from Winnipeg South; loses the Winnipeg neighbourhoods of Tuxedo, Tuxedo South, Old Tuxedo and Edgeland to Winnipeg West
- Winnipeg West: Replaces Charleswood—St. James—Assiniboia—Headingley; gains the Rural Municipality of Rosser from Selkirk—Interlake—Eastman.

=== New Brunswick ===
On April 18, 2023, the Federal Electoral Boundaries Commission for New Brunswick completed its work, with the final report as submitted to the House of Commons being considered final.

- Acadie—Bathurst: Gains the remainder of the Regional Municipality of Tracadie from Miramichi—Grand Lake
- Beauséjour: Loses the remainder of Moncton to Moncton—Dieppe
- Fredericton—Oromocto: Replaces Fredericton; border with Tobique—Mactaquac rerouted to follow the northern border of the City of Fredericton (2023 borders); loses the remainder of the Parishes of Maugerville, Sheffield and Canning to Miramichi—Grand Lake; loses Burton Parish to Saint John—St. Croix, except for those parts of the parish that will be transferred to the Town of Oromocto in 2023
- Fundy Royal: Gains the remainder of the Town of Riverview from Moncton—Riverview—Dieppe; loses Waterborough to Miramichi—Grand Lake; loses Quispamsis to Saint John—Kennebecasis
- Madawaska—Restigouche: Gains the parishes of Drummond and the northern half of Grand Falls and the municipalities of Saint-André, Grand Falls and Drummond from Tobique—Mactaquac. Boundary with Miramichi—Grand Lake rerouted around Mount Carleton Provincial Park and the Nepisiguit Protected Natural Area
- Miramichi—Grand Lake: Boundary with Madawaska—Restigouche rerouted around Mount Carleton Provincial Park and the Nepisiguit Protected Natural Area; loses the remainder of the Regional Municipality of Tracadie to Acadie—Bathurst; gains the remainder of the Parishes of Maugerville, Sheffield and Canning from Fredericton; gains Waterborough from Fundy Royal
- Moncton—Dieppe: Replaces Moncton—Riverview—Dieppe; loses the remainder of the Town of Riverview to Fundy Royal; gains the remainder of the City of Moncton from Beauséjour and Fundy Royal (2023 borders)
- Saint John—Kennebecasis: New riding, consists of the City of Saint John east of the St. John River, plus the Towns of Quispamsis and Rothesay (2023 borders)
- Saint John—St. Croix: New riding, largely replacing New Brunswick Southwest; gains the City of Saint John west of the St. John River from Saint John—Rothesay; gains Burton from Fredericton; loses the Parishes of Dumfries, Prince William, Manners Sutton, Kingsclear, and the municipalities of Hanwell, and Harvey and the Indian Reserve of Kingsclear 6 to Tobique—Mactaquac
- Tobique—Mactaquac: Gains the Parishes of Dumfries, Prince William, Manners Sutton, and Kingsclear, and the municipalities of Hanwell, and Harvey and the Indian Reserve of Kingsclear 6 from New Brunswick Southwest; border with Fredericton—Oromocto (replacing Fredericton) rerouted to follow the northern border of the City of Fredericton (2023 borders); loses the parishes of Drummond and Grand Falls and the municipalities of Saint-André, Grand Falls and Drummond to Madawaska—Restigouche

=== Newfoundland and Labrador ===
On March 23, 2023, the Federal Electoral Boundaries Commission for Newfoundland and Labrador completed its work, with the final report as submitted to the House of Commons being considered final.

- Avalon: Loses the eastern shore of Placentia Bay to Terra Nova—The Peninsulas; gains Salmon Cove from Bonavista—Burin—Trinity; loses the remainder of Paradise to Cape Spear; gains Witless Bay, Bay Bulls and the Southlands and Goulds areas of St. John's from St. John's South—Mount Pearl
- Cape Spear: Largely replaces St. John's South—Mount Pearl; gains Paradise from Avalon and St. John's East; loses Witless Bay, Bay Bulls and the Southlands and Goulds areas of St. John's to Avalon; loses the remainder of St. John's Harbour, the Wishingwell Park area and the Ayre Athletic Field area to St. John's East
- Central Newfoundland: Replaces Coast of Bays—Central—Notre Dame; loses the communities of Galeville, Georges Cove and The Beaches to Long Range Mountains
- Labrador: No changes.
- Long Range Mountains: Gains the communities of Galeville, Georges Cove and The Beaches from Coast of Bays—Central—Notre Dame
- St. John's East: Loses the remainder of Paradise to Cape Spear; gains the remainder of St. John's Harbour, the Wishingwell Park area and the Ayre Athletic Field area from St. John's South—Mount Pearl
- Terra Nova—The Peninsulas: Largely replaces Bonavista—Burin—Trinity; gains the eastern shore of Placentia Bay from Avalon; loses Salmon Cove to Avalon.

=== Nova Scotia ===
On April 26, 2023, the Federal Electoral Boundaries Commission for Nova Scotia completed its work, with the final report as submitted to the House of Commons being considered final.

- Acadie—Annapolis: Replaces West Nova; loses some territory (Berwick area) in Kings County to Kings—Hants.
- Cape Breton—Canso—Antigonish: Mostly replaces Cape Breton—Canso; gains remainder of Antigonish County from Central Nova. Exchanges territory with Sydney—Victoria (gains Victoria, remainder of Inverness and rural western part of the Cape Breton Regional Municipality; loses urban part of the Cape Breton Regional Municipality from Sydney Forks to Morien, including Glace Bay area).
- Central Nova: Originally named "Pictou—Eastern Shore" in the final report; loses the remainder of Antigonish County to Cape Breton—Canso—Antigonish; gains the Lawrencetown, Porters Lake and Chezzetcook from Sackville—Preston—Chezzetcook.
- Cumberland—Colchester: No changes.
- Dartmouth—Cole Harbour: Gains the Eastern Passage area from Sackville—Preston—Chezzetcook; loses all of the area north of Highways 111 and 118 plus the Lake Charles area to Sackville—Bedford—Preston.
- Halifax: Loses the Fairmount area to Halifax West.
- Halifax West: Gains the Fairmount area from Halifax and the Chebucto Peninsula from South Shore—St. Margarets; loses the Bedford, Hammonds Plains and Lucasville areas to Sackville—Bedford—Preston.
- Kings—Hants: Gains some territory (Berwick area) in Kings County from West Nova.
- Sackville—Bedford—Preston: Replaces Sackville—Preston—Chezzetcook; gains the Bedford, Hammonds Plains and Lucasville areas from Halifax West; gains the area north of Highways 111 and 118 plus the Lake Charles area from Dartmouth—Cole Harbour; loses the Lawrencetown, Porters Lake and Chezzetcook areas to Central Nova.
- South Shore—St. Margarets: Loses the Chebucto Peninsula to Halifax West.
- Sydney—Glace Bay: Mostly replaces Sydney—Victoria. Exchanges territory with Cape Breton—Canso (loses Victoria, remainder of Inverness and rural western part of the Cape Breton Regional Municipality; gains urban part of the Cape Breton Regional Municipality from Sydney Forks to Morien, including Glace Bay area).

=== Ontario ===
On July 20, 2023, the Federal Electoral Boundaries Commission for Ontario completed its work, with the final report as submitted to the House of Commons being considered final.

- Ajax: No changes.
- Algonquin—Renfrew—Pembroke: Replaces Renfrew—Nipissing—Pembroke. No changes.
- Aurora—Oak Ridges—Richmond Hill: Gains the Aurora neighbourhoods of Hills of St. Andrew and Aurora Heights from Newmarket—Aurora. Loses all of its territory south of Elgin Mills Road (Rouge Woods area of Richmond Hill) to Richmond Hill South.
- Barrie—Springwater—Oro-Medonte: Gains the remainder of Oro-Medonte from Simcoe North.
- Barrie South—Innisfil: Replaces Barrie—Innisfil. No boundary changes.
- Bay of Quinte: Loses the area of Quinte West north of the 401 and east of the Trent River (except for the Frankford area) to Hastings—Lennox and Addington—Tyendinaga.
- Beaches—East York: Eastern border south of Queen Street moved to Nursewood Road, losing a small piece of territory to Scarborough Southwest.
- Bowmanville—Oshawa North: Replaces Durham. Loses Scugog and Mississaugas of Scugog Island to York—Durham.
- Brampton Centre: Riding shifts westward substantially, losing all of its territory east of Highway 410 to Brampton—Chinguacousy Park and south of Etobicoke Creek to Brampton South. Gains the neighbourhood of Fletcher's Creek Village from Brampton West; gains the neighbourhood of Brampton West (currently split between Brampton West and Brampton South); gains the neighbourhoods of Downtown Brampton, Brampton South and Brampton East from Brampton South.
- Brampton East: Loses all of its territory west of Airport Road to Brampton North—Caledon.
- Brampton North—Caledon: Replaces Brampton North. Gains all of Dufferin—Caledon in Caledon south of King Street and west of The Gore Road. Gains all of Brampton East west of Airport Road; Loses all of the neighbourhoods of Westgate, Central Park, and Northgate plus all of Sandringham-Wellington east of Dixie Road and south of Sandalwood Parkway to Brampton—Chinguacousy Park.
- Brampton South: Gains Huttonville and Northwood Park, plus that part of Credit Valley south of Williams Parkway from Brampton West. Gains all of Brampton Centre south of Etobicoke Creek. Loses the neighbourhoods of Brampton West, Downtown Brampton, Brampton South and Brampton East to Brampton Centre.
- Brampton West: Loses Huttonville and Northwood Park, plus that part of Credit Valley south of Williams Parkway to Brampton South. Loses the neighbourhoods of Fletcher's Creek Village and Brampton West to Brampton Centre.
- Brampton—Chinguacousy Park: New riding carved out of all of Brampton Centre east of Highway 410 plus the neighbourhoods of Westgate, Central Park, and Northgate plus all of Sandringham-Wellington east of Dixie Road and south of Sandalwood Parkway carved out of Brampton North.
- Brantford—Brant South—Six Nations: Replaces Brantford—Brant. Gains the remainder of the County of Brant from Oxford. Loses that part of the County of Brant located roughly north of Brantford (Paris and St. George areas) to Flamborough—Glanbrook—Brant North.
- Bruce—Grey—Owen Sound: No changes.
- Burlington: No changes.
- Burlington North—Milton West: New riding carved out of that part of Milton west of Regional Road 25, and that part of Oakville North—Burlington in the City of Burlington.
- Cambridge: Loses all of its territory in the County of Brant to Flamborough—Glanbrook—Brant North.
- Carleton: Gains all of Kanata—Carleton west of the 417 and north of Craig's Side Road / Murphy Side Road / Constance Lake Road / Berry Side Road, and south of Hazeldean Road and west of Terry Fox Drive. Gains the rural parts (south of Bells Corners, west of the 416 and south of Barnsdale Road) of Nepean. Gains all of Orléans and Glengarry—Prescott—Russell south of Highway 417 and within the city of Ottawa, and that part of Ottawa South south of the 417 and Hunt Club Road and east of Hawthorne Road. Loses all of its territory north of Hazeldean Road to Kanata. Loses the Findlay Creek area to Ottawa South.
- Chatham-Kent—Leamington: Gains the remainder of Chatham-Kent from Lambton—Kent—Middlesex. Loses all of its territory in Lakeshore to Essex.
- Davenport: Gains area south of Eglinton Avenue and east of the CPR from York South—Weston (Keelesdale-Eglinton West); Gains the area south of Vaughan Road and west of Winona Drive from Toronto—St. Paul's (in Oakwood Village); Gains area north of Queen Street and west of Ossington Avenue (in Beaconsfield Village) from Spadina—Fort York.
- Don Valley North: Gains that part of Don Valley West and Don Valley East north of York Mills Road and west of the Don River (York Ridge, St. Andrew's, Fifeshire, and York Mills). Loses all of its territory east of the 404 (Pleasantview) to Scarborough—Agincourt.
- Don Valley West: Gains all of Don Valley East west of the Don River and south of York Mills Road (Don Mills, Wynford-Concorde, Flemingdon Park); Loses all of its territory north of York Mills Road (York Ridge, St. Andrew's, Fifeshire, and York Mills); Loses the remainder of Davisville Village to Toronto—St. Paul's.
- Dufferin—Caledon: Loses Caledon south of King Street and west of The Gore Road to Brampton North—Caledon.
- Eglinton—Lawrence: No boundary changes.
- Elgin—St. Thomas—London South: Replaces Elgin—Middlesex—London. Loses Thames Centre to Middlesex—London.
- Essex: Gains that part of Lakeshore in Chatham-Kent—Leamington. Loses that part of Lakeshore north of the 401 and west of the Puce River to Windsor—Tecumseh—Lakeshore.
- Etobicoke Centre: Gains Willowridge from Etobicoke North. Gains all of Etobicoke—Lakeshore north of the CPR. Loses all of its territory south of Dundas Street to Etobicoke—Lakeshore; Loses that part of The Westway neighbourhood east of Kipling Avenue to Etobicoke North. Loses Humber Heights-Westmount to York South—Weston—Etobicoke.
- Etobicoke North: Gains that part of The Westway neighbourhood east of Kipling Avenue from Etobicoke Centre. Loses Willowridge to Etobicoke Centre. Loses its small part of Humber Heights-Westmount to York South—Weston—Etobicoke.
- Etobicoke—Lakeshore: Gains all of that part of Etobicoke Centre south of Dundas Street. Loses all of its territory north of the CPR to Etobicoke Centre.
- Flamborough—Glanbrook—Brant North: Replaces Flamborough—Glanbrook. Gains that part of the County of Brant located roughly north of Brantford (Paris and St. George areas) from Brantford—Brant. Gains the remainder of the County of Brant from Cambridge. Loses all of its territory north of the Hydro corridor between Glancaster Road and Upper Centennial Parkway to Hamilton Mountain and Hamilton East—Stoney Creek.
- Guelph: Loses the Guelph neighbourhoods of University Village, Kortright Hills, Clairfields and Westminster to Wellington—Halton Hills North.
- Haldimand—Norfolk: No boundary changes.
- Haliburton—Kawartha Lakes: Replaces Haliburton—Kawartha Lakes—Brock. Gains Trent Lakes and North Kawartha from Peterborough—Kawartha; Loses Brock to York—Durham.
- Hamilton Centre: Gains the remainder of the Dundurn neighbourhood from Hamilton West—Ancaster—Dundas. Gains the neighbourhoods of Homeside, Normanhurst, Bartonville, Glenview, and Rosedale from Hamilton East—Stoney Creek.
- Hamilton East—Stoney Creek: Gains the area north of the Hydro corridor between Glover Road and the Upper Centennial Parkway from Flamborough—Glanbrook. Loses the neighbourhoods of Homeside, Normanhurst, Bartonville, Glenview, and Rosedale to Hamilton Centre.
- Hamilton Mountain: Gains the area north of the Hyrdro corridor between Garth Street and Glover Road from Flamborough—Glanbrook.
- Hamilton West—Ancaster—Dundas: Gains the Carpenter neighbourhood from Flamborough—Glanbrook. Loses the remainder of the Dundurn to Hamilton Centre.
- Hastings—Lennox and Addington—Tyendinaga: Replaces Hastings—Lennox and Addington. Gains the area of Quinte West north of the 401 and east of the Trent River (except for the Frankford area) from Bay of Quinte.
- Humber River—Black Creek: No changes.
- Huron—Bruce: No changes.
- Kanata: Largely replaces Kanata—Carleton. Gains Bells Corners from Nepean; Gains Shirleys Bay area from Ottawa West—Nepean; Gains area north of Hazeldean Road from Carleton. Loses all territory west of the 417 and north of Craig's Side Road / Murphy Side Road / Constance Lake Road / Berry Side Road, and south of Hazeldean Road and west of Terry Fox Drive to Carleton.
- Kapuskasing—Timmins—Mushkegowuk: Largely replaces Timmins-James Bay. Gains the Highway 11 corridor and the Chapleau area from Algoma—Manitoulin—Kapuskasing. Loses Marten Falls 65 and the area south of the Albany River and generally west of the Kenogami River to Thunder Bay—Superior North. Loses the southeastern quarter of Timiskaming District (James eastward and Chamberlain southward) to Nipissing—Timiskaming
- Kenora—Kiiwetinoong: Replaces Kenora. Loses Fort Hope 64, Neskantaga, Webequie, and Summer Beaver to Thunder Bay—Superior North.
- Kingston and the Islands: Gains the remainder of Kingston from Lanark—Frontenac—Kingston.
- King—Vaughan: Gains the remainder of King from York—Simcoe. Gains the Sherwood area from Thornhill. Its border with Vaughan—Woodbridge west of Islington Avenue is re-routed to follow Major Mackenzie Drive for its entirety. Loses Vellore Village west of Highway 400 to Vaughan—Woodbridge. Loses the area south of Major Mackenzie and east of Dufferin Street to Thornhill.
- Kitchener Centre: Gains the remainder of the City of Kitchener from Waterloo. Loses the Forest Hill neighbourhood to Kitchener—Conestoga.
- Kitchener South—Hespeler: No changes.
- Kitchener—Conestoga: Gains the Forest Hill neighbourhood from Kitchener Centre.
- Lanark—Frontenac: Replaces Lanark—Frontenac—Kingston. Loses the remainder of the City of Kingston to Kingston and the Islands.
- Leeds—Grenville—Thousand Islands—Rideau Lakes: Replaces Leeds—Grenville—Thousand Islands and Rideau Lakes. No changes.
- London Centre: Replaces London North Centre. Gains the London neighbourhoods of South London and Highland north of Commissioners Road from London West. Loses the area north of Fanshawe Park Road to Middlesex—London.
- London West: Loses the London neighbourhoods of South London and Highland north of Commissioners Road to London Centre. Loses the area north of Fanshawe Park Road to Middlesex—London.
- London—Fanshawe. Loses the area north of Fanshawe Park Road to Middlesex—London.
- Markham—Stouffville: Gains that part of Markham—Unionville south of Bur Oak Avenue and east of McCowan Road. Loses all of its territory south of the 407 to Markham—Thornhill; Loses all of its territory north and west of Stouffville to York—Durham.
- Markham—Thornhill: Gains all of Markham—Stouffville south of the 407.
- Markham—Unionville: Loses the areas south of Bur Oak Avenue and east of McCowan Road to Markham—Stouffville.
- Middlesex—London: Partially replaces Lambton—Kent—Middlesex. Gains Thames Centre from Elgin—Middlesex—London; Gains all of the City of London north of Fanshawe Park Road from London West, London North Centre and London—Fanshawe. Loses all of its territory in Lambton County to Sarnia—Lambton—Bkejwanong; Loses all of its territory in Chatham-Kent to Chatham-Kent—Leamington.
- Milton East—Halton Hills South: New district, containing that part of Milton east of Regional Road 25, plus the Georgetown area and that part of Halton Hills south of Sideroad 15 taken from Wellington—Halton Hills.
- Mississauga Centre: Gains that part of Mississauga—Malton south of Bristol Road and east of Fairwind Drive; Gains the Fairview area and that part of Cooksville west of Confederation Parkway and north of Dundas Street from Mississauga East—Cooksville. Loses the area north of the 403 and west of Creditview Road to Mississauga—Streetsville; Loses all of its territory east of Hurontario Street to Mississauga East—Cooksville.
- Mississauga East—Cooksville: Gains all of Mississauga Centre east of Hurontario Street. Loses the Fairview area and that part of Cooksville west of Confederation Parkway and north of Dundas Street to Mississauga Centre. Loses the area west of Stillmeadow Road to Mississauga—Lakeshore.
- Mississauga—Erin Mills: Loses all of its territory east of Erin Mills Parkway and north of the 403 to Mississauga—Streetsville.
- Mississauga—Lakeshore: Gains that part of Mississauga East—Cooksville south of Dundas Street and west of Stillmeadow Road.
- Mississauga—Malton: Gains that part of Meadowvale Village east of the Credit River from Mississauga—Streetsville. Loses its territory south of Bristol Road and east of Fairwind Drive to Mississauga Centre.
- Mississauga—Streetsville: Gains the area north of the 403 and west of Creditview Road from Mississauga Centre; Gains the territory north of the 403 and east of Erin Mills Parkway from Mississauga—Erin Mills. Loses that part of Meadowvale Village east of the Credit River to Mississauga—Malton.
- Nepean: Gains that part of Ottawa West—Nepean north of the CNR. Loses all of its territory west of Highway 416 to Kanata and Carleton. Loses its territory south of Barnsdale Road to Carleton. Loses a small piece of territory east of the 416 and north of Richmond Road to Ottawa West—Nepean.
- New Tecumseth—Gwillimbury: Largely replaces York—Simcoe. Gains New Tecumseth from Simcoe—Grey. Loses Georgina and the Chippewas of Georgina Island First Nation to York—Durham; Loses the remainder of King to King—Vaughan.
- Newmarket—Aurora: Loses the Aurora neighbourhoods of Hills of St. Andrew and Aurora Heights to Aurora—Oak Ridges—Richmond Hill.
- Niagara Falls—Niagara-on-the-Lake: Replaces Niagara Falls. Loses Fort Erie to Niagara South.
- Niagara South: Replaces Niagara Centre. Gains Fort Erie from Niagara Falls. Loses all of its territory in the City of St. Catharines to Niagara West and St. Catharines.
- Niagara West: Gains the Western Hill neighbourhood of the City of St. Catharines from St. Catharines and Niagara Centre.
- Nipissing—Timiskaming: Gains the southeastern quarter of Timiskaming District (James eastward and Chamberlain southward) from Timmins-James Bay.
- Northumberland—Clarke: Replaces Northumberland—Peterborough South. Loses all of its territory in Peterborough County to Peterborough.
- Oakville East: New electoral district. Contains all of the Town of Oakville east of Sixteen Mile Creek. Takes in parts of Oakville and Oakville North—Burlington.
- Oakville West: New electoral district. Contains all of the Town of Oakville west of Sixteen Mile Creek. Takes in parts of Oakville and Oakville North—Burlington.
- Orléans: Loses Blackburn Hamlet to Ottawa—Vanier—Gloucester; Loses the area east of Cardinal Creek to Prescott—Russell—Cumberland; Loses all of its rural territory Mer Bleue Bog southward to Prescott—Russell—Cumberland and Carleton.
- Oshawa: No changes.
- Ottawa Centre: Gains Riverside Park and Heron Park from Ottawa South; Loses the remainder of Carlington, plus the neighbourhoods of McKellar Park, McKellar Heights and Highland Park to Ottawa West—Nepean.
- Ottawa South: Gains Findlay Creek area from Carleton. Loses Riverside Park and Heron Park to Ottawa Centre.
- Ottawa West—Nepean: Gains the neighbourhoods of McKellar Park, McKellar Heights and Highland Park from Ottawa Centre; Gains a small piece of territory east of the 416 and north of Richmond Road to Nepean. Loses Shirleys Bay and a small piece of territory west of the 416 to Kanata; Loses the area south of the CNR to Nepean.
- Ottawa—Vanier—Gloucester: Replaces Ottawa—Vanier. Gains Blackburn Hamlet from Orléans. Loses territory south of Innes Road to Prescott—Russell—Cumberland.
- Oxford: Loses all of its territory in the County of Brant to Brantford—Brant South—Six Nations.
- Parry Sound—Muskoka: Gains a small piece of territory near Port Severn as well as the Sawdust Islands, Green Island, Canary Island and Marshal Island from Simcoe North that was annexed by the Municipality of Georgian Bay.
- Perth—Wellington: No boundary changes.
- Peterborough: Replaces Peterborough—Kawartha. Gains the remainder of Peterborough County from Northumberland—Peterborough South. Loses Trent Lakes and North Kawartha to Haliburton—Kawartha Lakes.
- Pickering—Brooklin: Replaces Pickering—Uxbridge. Gains that part of Whitby north of the 407. Loses Uxbridge to York—Durham.
- Prescott—Russell—Cumberland: Replaces Glengarry—Prescott—Russell. Gains area east of Cardinal Creek and rural area around the Mer Bleue Bog south to Highway 417 from Orléans; Gains a small piece of territory south of Innes Road from Ottawa—Vanier. Loses all of the City of Ottawa south of Highway 417 to Carleton; Loses North Glengarry to Stormont—Dundas—Glengarry.
- Richmond Hill South: Replaces Richmond Hill. Gains all of Aurora—Oak Ridges—Richmond Hill south of Elgin Mills Road (Rouge Woods area of Richmond Hill).
- Sarnia—Lambton—Bkejwanong: Replaces Sarnia—Lambton. Gains the remainder of Lambton County from Lambton—Kent—Middlesex.
- Sault Ste. Marie—Algoma: Replaces Sault Ste. Marie. Gains the eastern shore of Lake Superior part of Algoma District including Hornepayne, and the north shore of Lake Huron area of Algoma as far east as Sagamok from Algoma—Manitoulin—Kapuskasing.
- Scarborough Centre—Don Valley East: Merger of Scarborough Centre and Don Valley East. Loses all of Don Valley East west of the Don River to Don Valley North and Don Valley West. Loses Eglinton East, Bendale South and Bendale-Glen Andrew neighbourhoods of Scarborough Centre to Scarborough—Woburn.
- Scarborough North: Gains all of Scarborough—Rouge Park west of Morningside Drive, uniting all of Malvern in one riding.
- Scarborough Southwest: Gains the remainder of Scarborough Village from Scarborough-Guildwood, while loses the Sylvan Park area east of Bellamy Ravine Creek to Scarborough—Guildwood—Rouge Park.
- Scarborough—Agincourt: Gains all of Don Valley North east of the 404 (Pleasantview area)
- Scarborough—Guildwood—Rouge Park: Replaces Scarborough—Rouge Park. Loses all of its territory west of Morningside Drive (Malvern) to Scarborough North. Gains the neighbourhoods of Morningside, Guildwood and the remainder of West Hill from Scarborough-Guildwood, with a small piece of Guildwood coming from Scarborough Southwest.
- Scarborough—Woburn. Largely replaces Scarborough-Guildwood. Gains the Eglinton East, Bendale South and Bendale-Glen Andrew neighbourhoods from Scarborough Centre. Loses the neighbourhoods of Morningside, Guildwood and the remainder of West Hill to Scarborough—Guildwood—Rouge Park.
- Simcoe North: Loses the remainder of Oro-Medonte to Barrie—Springwater—Oro-Medonte. Loses a small piece of territory near Port Severn as well as the Sawdust Islands, Green Island, Canary Island and Marshal Island that was annexed by the Municipality of Georgian Bay to Parry Sound-Muskoka.
- Simcoe—Grey: Loses New Tecumseth to New Tecumseth—Gwillimbury.
- Spadina—Harbourfront: Replaces Spadina—Fort York. Gains that part of Toronto Centre south of Queen Street and west of Yonge Street. Loses its territory north of Queen Street to Davenport and University—Rosedale; Loses its territory east of Yonge Street and north of the Gardiner Expressway to Toronto Centre. Loses a small area east of Parliament Street and south of the Gardiner to Toronto—Danforth. Loses its territory north of the Gardiner and west of Atlantic Street to Taiaiko'n—Parkdale—High Park.
- St. Catharines: Gains that part of Niagara Centre in the City of St. Catharines that is east of Twelve Mile Creek. Loses its territory in the Western Hill neighbourhood to Niagara West.
- Stormont—Dundas—Glengarry: Replaces Stormont—Dundas—South Glengarry. Gains North Glengarry from Glengarry—Prescott—Russell.
- Sudbury: Gains Nickel Centre, Wanup and the remainder of the former city of Sudbury from Nickel Belt. Loses all of its territory west of Highway 144 to Sudbury East—Manitoulin—Nickel Belt.
- Sudbury East—Manitoulin—Nickel Belt. Replaces Nickel Belt. Gains all of Sudbury west of Highway 144. Gains Manitoulin District and that part of Sudbury District near Lake Huron from Algoma—Manitoulin—Kapuskasing. Loses Nickel Centre, Wanup and the remainder of the former city of Sudbury to Sudbury.
- Taiaiko'n—Parkdale—High Park: Replaces Parkdale—High Park. Gains the area south of a powerline corridor north of St. Clair Avenue from York South—Weston. Gains the territory north of the Gardiner Expressway and west of Atlantic Street from Spadina—Fort York.
- Thornhill: Gains the area south of Major Mackenzie Drive and east of Dufferin Street in Vaughan from King—Vaughan. Loses the Sherwood area to King—Vaughan.
- Thunder Bay—Rainy River: No changes.
- Thunder Bay—Superior North: Gains Fort Hope 64, Neskantaga, Webequie, and Summer Beaver from Kenora. Gains Marten Falls 65 and the area south of the Albany River and generally west of the Kenogami River from Timmins-James Bay. Gains Pic Mobert North, Pic Mobert South and Pukaskwa National Park area from Algoma—Manitoulin—Kapuskasing.
- Toronto Centre: Gains the area east of Yonge Street and north of the Gardiner Expressway from Spadina—Fort York. Gains all territory south of Bloor Street and east of Yonge from University—Rosedale. Loses all territory west of Yonge to University—Rosedale and Spadina—Harbourfront.
- Toronto—Danforth: Gains small area east of Parliament Street and south of the Gardiner Expressway from Spadina—Fort York.
- Toronto—St. Paul's: Gains the remainder of Davisville Village from Don Valley West. Gains the area north of the CPR (Moore Park area) in University—Rosedale. Loses the area south of Vaughan Road and west of Winona Drive (in Oakwood Village) to Davenport.
- University—Rosedale: Gains that part of Spadina—Fort York north of Queen Street and east of Ossington Avenue. Gains that part of Toronto Centre north of Queen and west of Yonge Street. Loses the area south of Bloor Street and east of Yonge to Toronto Centre. Loses the area north of the CPR (Moore Park area) to Toronto—St. Paul's.
- Vaughan—Woodbridge: Its border with King—Vaughan west of Islington Avenue is re-routed to follow Major Mackenzie Drive for its entirety. Gains Vellore Village west of Highway 400 from King—Vaughan.
- Waterloo: Loses all of the riding that is in the City of Kitchener to Kitchener Centre.
- Wellington—Halton Hills North: Replaces Wellington—Halton Hills. Gains the City of Guelph neighbourhoods of University Village, Kortright Hills, Clairfields and Westminster from Guelph. Loses the Georgetown area and that part of Halton Hills south of Sideroad 15 to Milton East—Halton Hills South.
- Whitby: Loses the area north of Highway 407 to Pickering—Brooklin.
- Willowdale: No changes.
- Windsor West: Gains some small parcels near the Windsor Airport from Windsor—Tecumseh.
- Windsor—Tecumseh—Lakeshore: Replaces Windsor—Tecumseh. Gains that part of Lakeshore north of the 401 and west of the Puce River from Essex. Loses some small parcels near the Windsor Airport to Windsor West.
- York Centre: No changes.
- York South—Weston—Etobicoke: Replaces York South—Weston. Gains the Humber Heights-Westmount neighbourhood from Etobicoke North and Etobicoke Centre. Loses the area south of Eglinton Avenue and east of the CPR to Davenport (Keelesdale-Eglinton West area); Loses the area south of a powerline corridor north of St. Clair Avenue to Taiaiko'n—Parkdale—High Park.
- York—Durham: New district. Takes Georgina and the Chippewas of Georgina Island First Nation from York—Simcoe. Takes Brock from Haliburton—Kawartha Lakes—Brock. Takes Uxbridge from Pickering—Uxbridge. Gains Scugog and Mississaugas of Scugog Island from Durham.

=== Prince Edward Island ===
On March 23, 2023, the Federal Electoral Boundaries Commission for Prince Edward Island completed its work, with the final report as submitted to the House of Commons being considered final.

- Cardigan: Loses all of its territory in North Shore and the North Shore Fire District, plus everything west of Highway 6 between them to Malpeque
- Charlottetown: Gains newly annexed territory by the City of Charlottetown in the Marshfield area from Malpeque
- Egmont: Gains the Bedeque area plus some areas east and southeast of Summerside from Malpeque
- Malpeque: Gains the remainder of North Shore and the North Shore Fire District, plus everything west of Highway 6 between them from Cardigan; loses the Bedeque area plus some areas east and southeast of Summerside from Malpeque; loses newly annexed territory by the City of Charlottetown in the Marshfield area to Charlottetown.

=== Quebec ===
On June 22, 2023, the Federal Electoral Boundaries Commission for Quebec completed its work, with the final report as submitted to the House of Commons being considered final.

- Abitibi—Baie-James—Nunavik—Eeyou: No change
- Abitibi—Témiscamingue: No change
- Ahuntsic-Cartierville: Loses the territory south of Boul. Acadie and east of Boul. Henri-Bourassa to Saint-Laurent
- Alfred-Pellan: Gains the territory east of Boul. des Laurentides from Vimy
- Argenteuil—La Petite-Nation: Loses the municipalities of Wentworth-Nord, Lac-des-Seize-Îles, Wentworth, Saint-Adolphe-d'Howard, Morin-Heights, Mille-Isles and Gore to Les Pays-d'en-Haut; gains Val-des-Monts from Pontiac; gains that part of the city of Gatineau north of Autoroute 50; and that part of Gatineau east of Av. du Cheval-Blanc, and south of a line that follows Rivière Blanche to Highway 148 from the riding of Gatineau
- Beauce: No change
- Beauharnois—Salaberry—Soulanges—Huntingdon: Largely replaces Salaberry—Suroît; gains Les Cèdres and Pointe-des-Cascades from Vaudreuil—Soulanges; loses the remainder of the Le Haut-Saint-Laurent MRC and both the Town and Township of Hemmingford to Châteauguay—Les Jardins-de-Napierville
- Beauport—Limoilou: Gains the remainder of the Chutes-Montmorency neighbourhood from Beauport—Côte-de-Beaupré—Île d'Orléans—Charlevoix; gains territory from Charlesbourg—Haute-Saint-Charles south of a line that follows Rue de Chamonix, 10e Av. East, and Boul. Louix-XIV; and an additional territory south of a line that follows 41e Rue West, to Boul. Henri-Bourassa to Autoroute 40
- Bécancour—Nicolet—Saurel—Alnôbak: New name for Bécancour—Nicolet—Saurel. No border changes
- Bellechasse—Les Etchemins—Lévis: Loses area west of 4e Av. and Rue St-Eustache in Lévis to Lévis—Lotbinière
- Beloeil—Chambly: Loses Carignan to Mont-Saint-Bruno—L'Acadie
- Berthier—Maskinongé: Gains Saint-Sulpice from Repentigny
- Bourassa: No change
- Brome—Missisquoi: No change
- Brossard—Saint-Lambert: No change
- Charlesbourg—Haute-Saint-Charles: Gains territory from Louis-Saint-Laurent east of the following line: Boul. Val-Cartier to Rue de la Rivière-Nelson, Rivière Saint-Charles, the eastern limits of the Wendake Indian Reserve, Boul. Bastien, Boul. Pierre-Bertrand; loses the territory east of Ch. de Château-Bigot and Av. du Bourg-Royal and north of Boul. Louis-XIV to Montmorency—Charlevoix; loses territory to Beauport—Limoilou south of a line that follows Rue de Chamonix, 10e Av. East, and Boul. Louix-XIV; and an additional territory south of a line that follows 41e Rue West, to Boul. Henri-Bourassa to Autoroute 40
- Châteauguay—Les Jardins-de-Napierville: Largely replaces Châteauguay—Lacolle; gains both the Village and Township of Hemmingford, and the municipalities of Très-Saint-Sacrement, Howick, Saint-Chrysostome, Havelock, and Franklin from Salaberry—Suroît; loses a small piece of territory north of Autoroute 30 in Saint-Isidore and a small piece of territory near Ch. St-Bernard in Châteauguay to La Prairie—Atateken
- Chicoutimi—Le Fjord: Gains the municipalities of Saint-David-de-Falardeau, Sainte-Rose-du-Nord, Saint-Fulgence, and Saint-Honoré from Jonquière
- Compton—Stanstead: Gains the Parc-Belvédère area from Sherbrooke
- Côte-du-Sud—Rivière-du-Loup—Kataskomiq—Témiscouata. Largely replaces Montmagny—L'Islet—Kamouraska—Rivière-du-Loup; gains the MRC of Témiscouata from Rimouski-Neigette—Témiscouata—Les Basques
- Côte-Nord—Kawawachikamach—Nitassinan: New name for Manicouagan. No other changes
- Dorval—Lachine—LaSalle; loses area east of Av. 90e East and south of Rue Airlie to LaSalle—Émard—Verdun
- Drummond: No change
- Gaspésie—Les Îles-de-la-Madeleine—Listuguj: Replaces Gaspésie—Les Îles-de-la-Madeleine; gains the entirety of the MRCs of La Matanie and Avignon from Avignon—La Mitis—Matane—Matapédia
- Gatineau: Loses that part of the city of Gatineau north of Autoroute 50; and that part of the City of Gatineau east of Av. du Cheval-Blanc, and south of a line that follows Rivière Blanche to Highway 148 to Argenteuil—La Petite-Nation; gains the remainder of the City of Gatineau west of Montée Paiement from Pontiac
- Hochelaga—Rosemont-Est: Replaces Hochelaga. The boundary with Saint-Léonard—Saint-Michel along Rue Bélanger moves to the borough boundary between Rosemont—La-Petite-Patrie and Saint-Léonard
- Honoré-Mercier: Gains the territory north of Boul. Langelier and west of Rue Bombardier from Saint-Léonard—Saint-Michel
- Hull—Aylmer: Loses the remainder of the Plateau neighbourhood to Pontiac—Kitigan Zibi
- Joliette—Manawan: Replaces Joliette; loses the municipalities of Saint-Donat and Notre-Dame-de-la-Merci to Laurentides—Labelle; loses Entrelacs and Chertsey to Les Pays-d'en-Haut; gains the Domaine-Ouellet area from Repentigny
- Jonquière; loses the municipalities of Saint-David-de-Falardeau, Sainte-Rose-du-Nord, Saint-Fulgence, and Saint-Honoré to Chicoutimi—Le Fjord; gains the municipalities of Hébertville, Hébertville-Station, L'Ascension-de-Notre-Seigneur, Saint-Augustin, Saint-Bruno, Sainte-Jeanne-d'Arc, Saint-Eugène-d'Argentenay, Saint-Ludger-de-Milot and Saint-Stanislas as well as the Passes-Dangereuses unorganized area from Lac-Saint-Jean
- La Pointe-de-l'Île: No changes
- La Prairie—Atateken: Replaces La Prairie; gains a small piece of territory north of Autoroute 30 in Saint-Isidore and a small piece of territory near Ch. St-Bernard in Châteauguay from Châteauguay—Lacolle
- Lac-Saint-Jean: Loses the municipalities of Hébertville, Hébertville-Station, L'Ascension-de-Notre-Seigneur, Saint-Augustin, Saint-Bruno, Sainte-Jeanne-d'Arc, Saint-Eugène-d'Argentenay, Saint-Ludger-de-Milot and Saint-Stanislas as well as the Passes-Dangereuses unorganized area to Jonquière
- Lac-Saint-Louis: No change
- LaSalle—Émard—Verdun; gains area east of Av. 90e East and south of Rue Airlie from Dorval—Lachine
- Laurentides—Labelle: Gains the municipalities of Saint-Donat and Notre-Dame-de-la-Merci from Joliette; loses all of its territory in the MRC of Les Pays-d'en-Haut to the new riding of Les Pays-d'en-Haut
- Laurier—Sainte-Marie: Loses the territory south of Av. Christophe-Colombe and west of Rue Rachel to Outremont; gains territory north of Boul. Robert-Bourassa and east of Av. Viger (including Saint Helen's Island and Notre Dame Island) from Ville-Marie—Le Sud-Ouest—Île-des-Soeurs
- Laval—Les Îles: No change
- Les Pays-d'en-Haut: New riding; takes the municipalities of Wentworth-Nord, Lac-des-Seize-Îles, Wentworth, Saint-Adolphe-d'Howard, Morin-Heights, Mille-Isles and Gore from Argenteuil—La Petite-Nation; takes Saint-Colomban from Mirabel; takes the municipalities of Sainte-Anne-des-Lacs, Saint-Sauveur, Piedmont, Sainte-Adèle, Sainte-Marguerite-du-Lac-Masson and Estérel from Laurentides—Labelle; takes Prévost and Saint-Hippolyte from Rivière-du-Nord; takes Saint-Calixte from Montcalm; takes Entrelacs and Chertsey from Joliette
- Lévis—Lotbinière: Gains area west of 4e Av. and Rue St-Eustache in Lévis from Bellechasse—Les Etchemins—Lévis; loses the municipalities of Leclercville, Val-Alain, Lotbinière, Sainte-Croix, Saint-Édouard-de-Lotbinière, Notre-Dame-du-Sacré-Coeur-d'Issoudun, Saint-Janvier-de-Joly, Laurier-Station, Saint-Flavien, Dosquet, and Sainte-Agathe-de-Lotbinière to Mégantic—L'Érable—Lotbinière
- Longueuil—Charles-LeMoyne: No change
- Longueuil—Saint-Hubert: No change
- Louis-Hébert: Loses the area east of Av. Maguire to Québec Centre
- Louis-Saint-Laurent—Akiawenhrahk: Replaces Louis-Saint-Laurent; loses territory to Charlesbourg—Haute-Saint-Charles east of the following line: Boul. Val-Cartier to Rue de la Rivière-Nelson, Rivière Saint-Charles, the eastern limits of the Wendake Indian Reserve, Boul. Bastien, Boul. Pierre-Bertrand
- Marc-Aurèle-Fortin: No change
- Mégantic—L'Érable—Lotbinière: Replaces Mégantic—L'Érable: Gains the municipalities of Dosquet, Laurier-Station, Leclercville, Lotbinière, Notre-Dame-du-Sacré-Coeur-d'Issoudun, Sainte-Agathe-de-Lotbinière, Sainte-Croix, Saint-Édouard-de-Lotbinière, Saint-Flavien, Saint-Janvier-de-Joly and Val-Alain from Lévis—Lotbinière
- Mirabel: Loses Saint-Colomban to Les Pays-d'en-Haut; gains the territory west of Montée Laurin, south of Ch. de la Rivière-Sud and west of Boul. Industriel in Saint-Eustache from Rivière-des-Mille-Îles; loses Sainte-Anne-des-Plaines to Rivière-du-Nord
- Mount Royal: Gains the territory south of Boul. Décaire and west of Ch. Côte-Saint-Luc from Notre-Dame-de-Grâce—Westmount
- Mont-Saint-Bruno—L'Acadie: Replaces Montarville; gains Carignan from Beloeil—Chambly
- Montcalm: Loses Saint-Calixte to Les Pays-d'en-Haut
- Montmorency—Charlevoix: Largely replaces Beauport—Côte-de-Beaupré—Île d'Orléans—Charlevoix; loses the Chutes-Montmorency area to Beauport—Limoilou; gains the territory east of Ch. de Château-Bigot and Av. du Bourg-Royal and north of Boul. Louis-XIV from Charlesbourg—Haute-Saint-Charles; gains the municipalities of Lac-Beauport and Sainte-Brigitte-de-Laval from Portneuf—Jacques-Cartier
- Notre-Dame-de-Grâce—Westmount: Loses the territory south of Boul. Décaire and west of Ch. Côte-Saint-Luc to Mount Royal; gains the territory west of Rue Notre-Dame and Av. Atwater from Ville-Marie—Le Sud-Ouest—Île-des-Sœurs
- Outremont: Gains the territory south of Av. Christophe-Colombe and west of Rue Rachel from Laurier—Sainte-Marie
- Papineau: No change
- Pierre-Boucher—Les Patriotes—Verchères: No change
- Pierrefonds—Dollard: No change
- Pontiac—Kitigan Zibi: Replaces Pontiac; loses Val-des-Monts to Argenteuil—La Petite-Nation; loses that part of the City of Gatineau west of Montée Paiement to the riding of Gatineau; gains the rest of the Plateau neighbourhood from Hull—Aylmer
- Portneuf—Jacques-Cartier: Loses the municipalities of Lac-Beauport and Sainte-Brigitte-de-Laval to Montmorency—Charlevoix
- Québec Centre: Replaces Québec; gains the area east of Av. Maguire from Louis-Hébert
- Repentigny: Loses the Domaine-Ouellet area to Joliette—Manawan; loses Saint-Sulpice to Berthier—Maskinongé
- Richmond—Arthabaska: No change
- Rimouski—La Matapédia: Merger of the Rimouski-Neigette—Témiscouata—Les Basques and Avignon—La Mitis—Matane—Matapédia districts; takes the MRCs of Les Basuqes and Rimouski-Neigette from Rimouski-Neigette—Témiscouata—Les Basques; takes the MRCs of La Mitis and Matapédia from Avignon—La Mitis—Matane—Matapédia
- Rivière-des-Mille-Îles: Loses the territory west of Montée Laurin, south of Ch. de la Rivière-Sud and west of Boul. Industriel in Saint-Eustache to Mirabel
- Rivière-du-Nord: Gains Sainte-Anne-des-Plaines from Mirabel; loses the municipalities of Prévost and Saint-Hippolyte to Les Pays-d'en-Haut
- Rosemont—La Petite-Patrie: No change
- Saint-Hyacinthe—Bagot—Acton. New name for Saint-Hyacinthe—Bagot. No other changes
- Saint-Jean: No change
- Saint-Laurent: Gains the territory south of Boul. Acadie and east of Boul. Henri-Bourassa from Ahuntsic-Cartierville
- Saint-Léonard—Saint-Michel: Loses the territory north of Boul. Langelier and west of Rue Bombardier to Honoré-Mercier; the boundary with Hochelaga along Rue Bélanger moved to the borough boundary between Rosemont—La-Petite-Patrie and Saint-Léonard
- Saint-Maurice—Champlain: No change
- Shefford: No change
- Sherbrooke: Loses the Parc-Belvédère area to Compton—Stanstead
- Terrebonne: Loses area west of Boul. des Laurentides to Thérèse-De Blainville
- Thérèse-De Blainville: Gains area west of Boul. des Laurentides from Terrebonne
- Trois-Rivières: No change
- Vaudreuil: Largely replaces Vaudreuil—Soulanges; loses Les Cèdres and Pointe-des-Cascades to Beauharnois—Salaberry—Soulanges—Huntingdon
- Ville-Marie—Le Sud-Ouest—Île-des-Sœurs: Loses the territory north of Boul. Robert-Bourassa and east of Av. Viger (including Saint Helen's Island and Notre Dame Island) to Laurier—Sainte-Marie; loses the territory west of Rue Notre-Dame and Av. Atwater to Notre-Dame-de-Grâce—Westmount
- Vimy: Loses the territory east of Boul. des Laurentides to Alfred-Pellan.

=== Saskatchewan ===
On April 26, 2023, the Federal Electoral Boundaries Commission for Saskatchewan completed its work, with the final report as submitted to the House of Commons being considered final. There were two modifications from the final report.

- Battlefords—Lloydminster—Meadow Lake: Replaces Battlefords—Lloydminster; gains the Beaver Lake, Spiritwood, Meadow Lake, Loon Lake and the remainder of the Medstead Rural Municipalities, including enclosed Indian Reserves, Villages and the City of Meadow Lake from Desnethé—Missinippi—Churchill River; loses the Rural Municipalities of Eye Hill, Grass Lake, Tramping Lake, Reford, Rosemount, Heart's Hill, Progress, Mariposa, Grandview, Antelope Park, Prairiedale, Oakdale, Winslow and all enclosed towns and villages in those RMs to Swift Current—Grasslands—Kindersley
- Carlton Trail—Eagle Creek: Gains the Rural Municipalities of St. Louis, Invergordon, and Flett's Springs, including the One Arrow 95 Indian Reserve, and the villages of St. Louis and Beatty from Prince Albert; gains the Rural Municipality of Lake Lenore and the Town of St. Brieux from Yorkton—Melville; gains the Humboldt Lake area, the Rural Municipality of Blucher, and the municipalities of Allan, Bradwell and Clavet from Moose Jaw—Lake Centre—Lanigan; gains the remainder of the Rural Municipality of Corman Park in the riding of Saskatoon—Grasswood; loses the Rural Municipalities of Biggar, Perdue, Mountain View, Marriott, Harris, Montrose, Pleasant Valley, St. Andrews, Milden and Fertile Valley, including all enclosed towns and villages to Swift Current—Grasslands—Kindersley; loses newly annexed territory by the City of Saskatoon to Saskatoon West, but also gains all of Saskatoon West not in the City of Saskatoon
- Desnethé—Missinippi—Churchill River: Loses the Beaver Lake, Spiritwood, Meadow Lake, Loon Lake and the remainder of the Medstead Rural Municipalities, including enclosed Indian Reserves, Villages and the City of Meadow Lake to Battlefords—Lloydminster—Meadow Lake; loses the Rural Municipalities of Big River, Canwood, Lakeland, plus Prince Albert National Park, and the remainder of the Rural Municipalities of Leask, Shellbrook, Paddowckwood and Torchwood, plus all enclosed and partially enclosed Indian Reserves, Towns and Villages to Prince Albert
- Moose Jaw—Lake Centre—Lanigan: Gains the remainder of the Rural Municipality of Prairie Rose from Regina—Qu'Appelle; gains the Rural Municipalities of Maple Bush, Enfield, Chaplin, Wheatlands, Caron, Shamrock, Rodgers, Hillsborough, Gravelbourg, Sutton, and Lake Johnston plus all enclosed towns and villages from Cypress Hills—Grasslands; loses the Humboldt Lake area, the Rural Municipality of Blucher, and the municipalities of Allan, Bradwell and Clavet to Carlton Trail—Eagle Creek; loses all newly annexed territory by the City of Regina to Regina—Lewvan (west of McCarthy Blvd) or Regina—Qu'Appelle (east of McCarthy); gains the parts of Regina—Lewvan and Regina—Wascana (south of Highway 33) not in the City of Regina
- Prince Albert: Gains the Rural Municipalities of Big River, Canwood, Lakeland, plus Prince Albert National Park, and the remainder of the Rural Municipalities of Leask, Shellbrook, Paddowckwood and Torchwood, plus all enclosed and partially enclosed Indian Reserves, Towns and Villages from Desnethé—Missinippi—Churchill River; loses the Rural Municipalities of Arborfield and Moose Range, and the municipalities of Tobin Lake, Carrot River and Arborfield to Yorkton—Melville; loses the Rural Municipalities of St. Louis, Invergordon, and Flett's Springs, including the One Arrow 95 Indian Reserve, and the villages of St. Louis and Beatty to Carlton Trail—Eagle Creek
- Regina—Lewvan: Gains the area south of 4th Avenue and West of Albert Street in Regina from Regina—Qu'Appelle; loses the neighbourhoods of Walsh Acres, Normanview and Regent Park to Regina—Qu'Appelle; gains all newly annexed territory by the City of Regina west of McCarthy Blvd from Moose Jaw—Lake Centre—Lanigan; loses the parts not in the City of Regina to Moose Jaw—Lake Centre—Lanigan
- Regina—Qu'Appelle: Loses the remainder of the Rural Municipality of Prairie Rose to Moose Jaw—Lake Centre—Lanigan; loses the Rural Municipality of Elfros No. 307 and the Village of Elfros to Yorkton—Melville; loses the area south of 4th Avenue and West of Albert Street in Regina to Regina—Lewvan; gains the neighbourhoods of Walsh Acres, Normanview and Regent Park; loses all newly annexed territory in the city of Regina south of the CP Railway to Regina—Wascana; gains that part of Regina—Wascana between Highways 1 and 33 not in the City of Regina
- Regina—Wascana: Loses all of its territory outside the City of Regina to either Moose Jaw—Lake Centre—Lanigan (west of Highway 33) or Regina—Qu'Appelle (east of Highway 33); gains newly annexed territory in the City of Regina from Regina—Qu'Appelle north of Highway 1
- Saskatoon South: Replaces Saskatoon—Grasswood; loses all of its territory outside of the City of Saskatoon to Carlton Trail—Eagle Creek; loses the area north of 8th Street and west of Highway 11 to Saskatoon—University
- Saskatoon—University: Gains that part of Saskatoon—Grasswood north of 8th Street and west of Highway 11
- Saskatoon West: Western border reconfigured to follow the new Saskatoon city limits
- Souris—Moose Mountain: Gains the Rural Municipalities of Stonehenge, Lake of the Rivers, Willow Bunch, Old Post and Poplar Valley, and all enclosed towns and villages from Cypress Hills—Grasslands
- Swift Current—Grasslands—Kindersley: Replaces Cypress Hills—Grasslands; loses the Rural Municipalities of Stonehenge, Lake of the Rivers, Willow Bunch, Old Post and Poplar Valley, and all enclosed towns and villages to Souris—Moose Mountain; loses the Rural Municipalities of Maple Bush, Enfield, Chaplin, Wheatlands, Caron, Shamrock, Rodgers, Hillsborough, Gravelbourg, Sutton, and Lake Johnston plus all enclosed towns and villages to Moose Jaw—Lake Centre—Lanigan; gains the Rural Municipalities of Eye Hill, Grass Lake, Tramping Lake, Reford, Rosemount, Heart's Hill, Progress, Mariposa, Grandview, Antelope Park, Prairiedale, Oakdale, Winslow and all enclosed towns and villages in those RMs from Battlefords—Lloydminster; gainsthe Rural Municipalities of Biggar, Perdue, Mountain View, Marriott, Harris, Montrose, Pleasant Valley, St. Andrews, Milden and Fertile Valley, including all enclosed towns and villages from Carlton Trail—Eagle Creek
- Yorkton—Melville: Loses the Rural Municipality of Lake Lenore and the Town of St. Brieux to Carlton Trail—Eagle Creek; gains the Rural Municipalities of Arborfield and Moose Range, and the municipalities of Tobin Lake, Carrot River and Arborfield from Prince Albert; gains Rural Municipality of Elfros No. 307 and the Village of Elfros from Regina—Qu'Appelle.

== Detailed transposed 2021 results ==
Ternary plot of 2021 transposed electoral results identified by Conservative (blue), Liberal (red), NDP (orange), BQ (cyan) and Green (green)

Interactive map using transposed results of the 2021 election, if they had taken place under the 2023 Representation Order

The 2025 Canadian federal election was the first election contested under the new electoral districts established in this redistribution. Consequently, media outlets tend to report seat gains and losses as compared to notional results. These are the results if all votes cast in 2021 were unchanged but regrouped by new electoral district boundaries, as published by Elections Canada.

2021 results transposed onto 2023 boundaries
Party	MPs		
Party	2021 actual result	2021 notional result	Change
Liberal	160	157	▼3
Conservative	119	126	▲7
Bloc Québécois	32	34	▲2
New Democratic	25	24	▼1
Green	2	2	Steady
Total seats	338	343	5 ▲

2021 election results transposed to 2023 redistribution of ridings
Constituency (Note: Sorted in order of electoral district number)		Turnout (pp)	Top 3 parties			Share of vote (pp) (Note: Sorted in order of national share for those parties achieving at least 1% of the total. All others grouped under Other.)							
Prov	Name	Turnout (pp)	1st	2nd	3rd	Con	Lib	NDP	BQ	PPC	Green	Other	Margin (1st vs 2nd)
NL	Avalon	52.89	Lib	Con	NDP	33.04	50.88	14.25	–	1.83	–	–	17.83
NL	Cape Spear	52.31	Lib	NDP	Con	20.38	54.72	23.13	–	1.77	–	–	31.60
NL	Central Newfoundland	51.12	Con	Lib	NDP	46.89	46.01	7.10	–	–	–	–	0.88
NL	Labrador	48.16	Lib	Con	NDP	30.35	42.67	23.80	–	3.18	–	–	12.32
NL	Long Range Mountains	52.57	Lib	Con	NDP	39.36	44.39	11.93	–	4.33	–	–	5.03
NL	St. John's East	57.46	Lib	NDP	Con	18.09	45.14	34.84	–	1.94	–	–	10.30
NL	Terra Nova—The Peninsulas	51.58	Lib	Con	NDP	40.45	47.26	8.33	–	3.96	–	–	6.81
PE	Cardigan	72.09	Lib	Con	NDP	30.91	50.57	9.77	–	3.28	4.81	0.66	19.65
PE	Charlottetown	70.47	Lib	Con	NDP	31.06	46.70	10.72	–	1.93	9.59	–	15.64
PE	Egmont	69.30	Lib	Con	Green	31.04	45.94	8.65	–	4.96	9.41	–	14.90
PE	Malpeque	74.68	Lib	Con	Green	33.13	42.02	8.03	–	2.79	14.02	0.01	8.89
NS	Acadie—Annapolis	62.68	Con	Lib	NDP	51.31	30.69	12.69	–	5.30	–	–	20.62
NS	Cape Breton—Canso—Antigonish	67.31	Lib	Con	NDP	35.11	45.43	14.75	–	3.95	0.49	0.27	10.33
NS	Central Nova	63.71	Lib	Con	NDP	32.85	44.30	16.15	–	3.99	1.52	1.19	11.45
NS	Cumberland—Colchester	60.05	Con	Lib	NDP	46.02	34.20	12.33	–	4.17	2.59	0.69	11.82
NS	Dartmouth—Cole Harbour	61.34	Lib	NDP	PPC	2.87	51.50	32.97	–	9.75	2.91	–	18.54
NS	Halifax	66.29	Lib	NDP	Con	12.75	42.24	40.29	–	2.11	2.21	0.40	1.95
NS	Halifax West	64.29	Lib	NDP	Con	21.55	47.55	26.00	–	2.30	2.45	0.15	21.56
NS	Kings—Hants	62.23	Lib	Con	NDP	30.25	44.39	18.90	–	4.53	1.93	–	14.15
NS	Sackville—Bedford—Preston	64.39	Lib	Con	NDP	24.99	44.65	24.78	–	3.48	2.05	0.05	19.66
NS	South Shore—St. Margarets	62.15	Con	Lib	NDP	43.39	35.58	18.20	–	–	2.83	–	7.82
NS	Sydney—Glace Bay	61.55	Lib	Con	NDP	34.17	41.93	19.76	–	3.27	0.64	0.23	7.76
NB	Acadie—Bathurst	64.81	Lib	Con	NDP	13.85	64.96	11.25	–	5.87	2.82	1.24	51.11
NB	Beauséjour	67.54	Lib	Con	NDP	19.42	55.54	10.97	–	7.58	5.70	0.79	36.11
NB	Fredericton—Oromocto	65.91	Lib	Con	NDP	34.51	37.79	13.00	–	0.34	12.89	1.48	3.28
NB	Fundy Royal	65.97	Con	Lib	NDP	46.33	25.59	14.50	–	8.58	5.00	–	20.74
NB	Madawaska—Restigouche	61.94	Lib	Con	PPC	27.77	51.99	6.16	–	7.54	2.72	3.83	24.22
NB	Miramichi—Grand Lake	67.34	Con	Lib	NDP	45.46	37.00	7.39	–	5.38	4.69	0.09	8.46
NB	Moncton—Dieppe	61.09	Lib	Con	NDP	22.60	50.03	16.80	–	6.30	4.26	–	27.44
NB	Saint John—Kennebecasis	60.57	Lib	Con	NDP	36.39	42.60	13.18	–	4.90	2.93	–	6.21
NB	Saint John—St. Croix	65.38	Con	Lib	NDP	47.00	28.07	13.09	–	7.64	4.05	0.15	18.93
NB	Tobique—Mactaquac	62.77	Con	Lib	NDP	52.83	22.65	11.53	–	7.23	4.90	0.86	30.18
QC	Abitibi—Baie-James—Nunavik—Eeyou	44.69	BQ	Lib	Con	15.85	25.97	11.69	37.92	3.77	1.55	3.25	11.96
QC	Abitibi—Témiscamingue	56.44	BQ	Lib	Con	11.69	24.11	6.12	50.61	3.37	1.64	2.48	26.50
QC	Ahuntsic-Cartierville	64.70	Lib	BQ	NDP	8.16	51.91	11.72	22.62	2.59	2.99	–	29.28
QC	Alfred-Pellan	66.22	Lib	BQ	Con	13.28	47.71	7.82	26.58	0.34	1.66	2.60	21.13
QC	Argenteuil—La Petite-Nation	60.31	Lib	BQ	Con	13.48	39.16	7.13	32.81	5.77	0.38	1.27	6.36
QC	Beauce	66.63	Con	PPC	BQ	48.29	12.32	2.90	15.17	18.19	0.85	2.29	30.10
QC	Beauharnois—Salaberry—Soulanges—Huntingdon	62.75	BQ	Lib	Con	11.85	27.30	7.42	48.32	3.31	0.19	1.61	21.02
QC	Beauport—Limoilou	65.41	BQ	Con	Lib	30.54	24.64	9.71	31.06	0.33	2.04	1.68	0.52
QC	Bécancour—Nicolet—Saurel—Alnôbak	63.40	BQ	Lib	Con	16.81	16.90	5.10	54.80	2.43	1.54	2.43	37.90
QC	Bellechasse—Les Etchemins—Lévis	66.47	Con	BQ	Lib	52.00	15.55	4.92	22.76	–	1.44	3.33	29.24
QC	Beloeil—Chambly	69.17	BQ	Lib	NDP	8.39	23.43	8.52	53.53	2.02	2.00	2.11	30.10
QC	Berthier—Maskinongé	64.87	BQ	NDP	Lib	10.92	15.40	32.69	35.93	2.64	0.97	1.46	3.25
QC	Bourassa	56.41	Lib	BQ	NDP	7.00	60.39	8.00	18.70	3.65	1.84	0.41	41.69
QC	Brome—Missisquoi	66.07	Lib	BQ	Con	16.20	34.96	6.23	34.64	3.22	2.38	2.37	0.32
QC	Brossard—Saint-Lambert	63.88	Lib	BQ	Con	11.99	54.10	10.39	19.94	2.46	–	1.11	34.16
QC	Charlesbourg—Haute-Saint-Charles	68.39	Con	BQ	Lib	45.02	19.65	5.92	24.64	2.20	1.67	0.89	20.39
QC	Châteauguay—Les Jardins-de-Napierville	62.59	BQ	Lib	Con	12.16	36.51	7.82	36.59	3.77	1.49	1.66	0.08
QC	Chicoutimi—Le Fjord	64.65	Con	BQ	Lib	40.37	18.22	4.70	34.07	1.37	1.17	0.09	6.30
QC	Compton—Stanstead	67.25	Lib	BQ	Con	17.41	36.66	7.54	30.51	3.76	2.81	1.31	6.15
QC	Côte-du-Sud—Rivière-du-Loup—Kataskomiq—Témiscouata	61.52	Con	BQ	Lib	44.88	19.05	3.38	29.81	0.35	–	2.52	15.08
QC	Côte-Nord—Kawawachikamach—Nitassinan	50.09	BQ	Con	Lib	21.83	18.70	4.31	52.63	–	–	2.53	30.80
QC	Dorval—Lachine—LaSalle	59.37	Lib	BQ	NDP	11.93	52.23	13.11	15.72	4.19	2.83	–	36.51
QC	Drummond	61.33	BQ	Lib	Con	17.93	18.78	11.15	46.62	–	–	5.51	27.84
QC	Gaspésie—Les Îles-de-la-Madeleine—Listuguj	57.02	BQ	Lib	Con	8.26	39.76	4.27	44.34	2.01	–	1.37	4.58
QC	Gatineau	64.80	Lib	BQ	Con	11.11	50.05	8.62	23.42	4.05	1.56	1.18	26.64
QC	Hochelaga—Rosemont-Est	61.37	Lib	BQ	NDP	4.71	38.43	20.28	31.42	2.27	2.00	0.89	7.02
QC	Honoré-Mercier	63.84	Lib	BQ	Con	10.54	59.99	7.31	16.28	4.18	1.50	0.18	43.71
QC	Hull—Aylmer	66.11	Lib	BQ	NDP	10.78	52.46	12.74	16.10	3.65	2.82	1.44	36.36
QC	Joliette—Manawan	62.15	BQ	Lib	Con	9.47	22.28	5.79	55.14	3.02	1.95	2.34	32.85
QC	Jonquière	63.12	BQ	Con	Lib	28.31	20.80	5.37	43.11	–	1.70	0.72	14.81
QC	La Pointe-de-l'Île	62.19	BQ	Lib	NDP	6.71	32.32	9.70	46.66	2.74	–	1.87	14.34
QC	La Prairie—Atateken	67.79	BQ	Lib	Con	9.94	34.61	7.30	43.73	2.59	1.66	0.17	9.12
QC	Lac-Saint-Jean	60.56	BQ	Con	Lib	25.27	18.97	3.27	50.90	–	1.60	–	25.64
QC	Lac-Saint-Louis	69.58	Lib	Con	NDP	18.90	56.26	13.30	5.33	2.97	3.24	–	37.36
QC	LaSalle—Émard—Verdun	60.28	Lib	BQ	NDP	7.63	43.42	19.01	21.83	3.41	3.01	1.70	21.59
QC	Laurentides—Labelle	60.99	BQ	Lib	Con	10.50	23.47	5.56	52.31	3.64	2.42	2.10	28.84
QC	Laurier—Sainte-Marie	56.28	Lib	NDP	BQ	4.50	39.51	30.43	20.13	1.77	2.23	1.44	9.08
QC	Laval—Les Îles	61.52	Lib	BQ	Con	17.71	48.93	7.69	19.08	5.08	1.50	–	29.85
QC	Les Pays-d'en-Haut	63.14	BQ	Lib	Con	11.66	25.89	6.89	47.54	4.33	1.53	2.16	21.65
QC	Lévis—Lotbinière	70.87	Con	BQ	Lib	49.70	15.37	7.28	22.82	2.38	1.35	1.10	26.88
QC	Longueuil—Charles-LeMoyne	59.80	Lib	BQ	NDP	8.31	40.44	10.33	35.28	2.94	2.44	0.25	5.16
QC	Longueuil—Saint-Hubert	67.64	BQ	Lib	NDP	6.93	38.32	7.95	41.20	2.37	2.79	0.44	2.88
QC	Louis-Hébert	74.18	Lib	BQ	Con	24.31	38.21	7.23	27.00	–	2.60	0.64	11.21
QC	Louis-Saint-Laurent—Akiawenhrahk	67.67	Con	BQ	Lib	52.03	17.34	5.28	20.13	2.13	1.42	1.68	31.90
QC	Marc-Aurèle-Fortin	67.21	Lib	BQ	Con	11.74	44.11	8.56	30.80	2.89	–	1.90	13.31
QC	Mégantic—L'Érable—Lotbinière	65.29	Con	BQ	Lib	56.71	13.50	3.12	19.61	3.52	1.31	2.24	37.10
QC	Mirabel	64.13	BQ	Lib	Con	13.31	24.39	8.61	45.82	3.80	2.16	1.91	21.43
QC	Mount Royal	57.37	Lib	Con	NDP	24.07	57.41	8.83	4.07	2.65	2.73	0.24	33.34
QC	Mont-Saint-Bruno—L'Acadie	73.74	BQ	Lib	Con	9.69	34.12	8.32	45.49	2.11	0.15	0.13	11.37
QC	Montcalm	57.45	BQ	Lib	Con	11.68	19.98	6.27	53.22	4.28	2.55	2.02	33.24
QC	Montmorency—Charlevoix	66.23	BQ	Con	Lib	33.88	20.20	4.63	36.70	1.88	1.19	1.51	2.82
QC	Notre-Dame-de-Grâce—Westmount	62.44	Lib	NDP	Con	13.45	52.83	20.08	5.98	3.25	4.00	0.40	32.76
QC	Outremont	56.88	Lib	NDP	BQ	7.31	44.36	27.30	15.44	2.13	3.12	0.33	17.06
QC	Papineau	63.47	Lib	NDP	BQ	4.84	50.30	22.68	15.04	2.34	3.19	1.61	27.62
QC	Pierre-Boucher—Les Patriotes—Verchères	68.98	BQ	Lib	Con	8.82	25.85	7.71	54.26	1.95	–	1.41	28.41
QC	Pierrefonds—Dollard	64.62	Lib	Con	NDP	20.83	56.01	11.54	7.92	3.71	–	–	35.18
QC	Pontiac—Kitigan Zibi	65.49	Lib	Con	BQ	21.40	43.86	11.35	15.17	4.48	2.90	0.85	22.46
QC	Portneuf—Jacques-Cartier	68.58	Con	BQ	Lib	52.35	15.15	4.72	23.74	2.45	–	1.60	28.61
QC	Québec Centre	67.46	Lib	BQ	Con	18.02	35.72	12.70	29.03	1.58	2.36	0.59	6.69
QC	Repentigny	66.03	BQ	Lib	Con	8.84	28.14	7.46	51.37	–	–	4.20	23.23
QC	Richmond—Arthabaska	66.16	Con	BQ	Lib	49.88	14.95	4.46	24.76	3.60	–	2.35	25.13
QC	Rimouski—La Matapédia	59.74	BQ	Lib	Con	11.20	22.08	5.86	54.30	2.06	–	4.51	32.21
QC	Rivière-des-Mille-Îles	65.46	BQ	Lib	Con	10.25	35.36	7.20	40.54	2.75	1.82	2.09	5.18
QC	Rivière-du-Nord	57.92	BQ	Lib	Con	12.04	22.47	6.88	51.60	3.83	0.29	2.89	29.13
QC	Rosemont—La Petite-Patrie	67.76	NDP	Lib	BQ	4.00	23.17	48.57	21.37	–	2.38	0.52	25.41
QC	Saint-Hyacinthe—Bagot—Acton	65.43	BQ	Lib	Con	13.51	22.68	11.63	47.45	2.72	–	1.99	24.77
QC	Saint-Jean	65.90	BQ	Lib	Con	12.74	28.12	7.28	46.01	–	2.13	3.72	17.89
QC	Saint-Laurent	56.88	Lib	Con	NDP	18.31	59.35	10.76	7.95	3.15	0.11	0.37	41.03
QC	Saint-Léonard—Saint-Michel	57.44	Lib	Con	NDP	10.46	69.60	8.20	7.98	3.76	–	–	59.14
QC	Saint-Maurice—Champlain	61.55	Lib	BQ	Con	18.00	42.45	5.06	30.07	–	1.30	3.13	12.38
QC	Shefford	65.14	BQ	Lib	Con	12.13	33.49	5.32	41.92	3.48	1.78	1.88	8.43
QC	Sherbrooke	65.15	Lib	BQ	NDP	12.83	37.53	13.93	29.01	2.46	2.87	1.36	8.52
QC	Terrebonne	66.19	BQ	Lib	Con	10.46	29.37	6.65	41.40	2.68	1.43	8.03	12.03
QC	Thérèse-De Blainville	63.92	BQ	Lib	Con	11.04	35.20	7.27	40.94	2.68	1.93	0.93	5.74
QC	Trois-Rivières	64.19	BQ	Con	Lib	29.35	28.63	8.05	29.49	1.92	1.30	1.26	0.14
QC	Vaudreuil	66.70	Lib	BQ	Con	16.47	47.47	10.64	20.96	–	2.53	1.93	26.51
QC	Ville-Marie—Le Sud-Ouest—Île-des-Sœurs	55.87	Lib	NDP	Con	12.82	51.37	18.08	11.94	2.61	2.67	0.51	33.28
QC	Vimy	58.39	Lib	BQ	Con	13.85	50.14	9.33	22.34	4.34	–	–	27.80
ON	Ajax	54.10	Lib	Con	NDP	26.60	56.83	14.04	–	–	2.52	–	30.23
ON	Algonquin—Renfrew—Pembroke	66.54	Con	NDP	Lib	49.50	19.37	20.96	–	7.64	1.90	0.64	28.55
ON	Aurora—Oak Ridges—Richmond Hill	56.69	Lib	Con	NDP	42.12	44.76	8.03	–	3.87	0.18	1.02	2.64
ON	Barrie South—Innisfil	59.16	Con	Lib	NDP	47.67	28.89	15.77	–	7.67	–	–	18.78
ON	Barrie—Springwater—Oro-Medonte	64.31	Con	Lib	NDP	45.79	30.41	16.62	–	6.93	0.21	0.03	15.37
ON	Bay of Quinte	64.56	Con	Lib	NDP	40.59	37.02	15.25	–	4.93	2.20	–	3.57
ON	Beaches—East York	64.91	Lib	NDP	Con	14.35	56.58	22.52	–	3.16	2.72	0.68	34.05
ON	Bowmanville—Oshawa North	59.63	Con	Lib	NDP	44.75	30.80	18.38	–	5.41	–	0.66	13.94
ON	Brampton Centre	53.03	Lib	Con	NDP	31.42	48.32	15.78	–	3.60	–	0.88	16.90
ON	Brampton—Chinguacousy Park	55.62	Lib	Con	NDP	31.01	50.81	16.82	–	–	–	1.37	19.80
ON	Brampton East	54.29	Lib	Con	NDP	28.56	53.19	15.62	–	2.63	–	–	24.64
ON	Brampton North—Caledon	57.62	Lib	Con	NDP	33.19	51.44	13.95	–	0.96	0.40	0.05	18.25
ON	Brampton South	55.90	Lib	Con	NDP	29.46	53.88	13.53	–	2.87	–	0.26	24.42
ON	Brampton West	53.41	Lib	Con	NDP	27.73	56.29	12.76	–	2.47	–	0.74	28.57
ON	Brantford—Brant South—Six Nations	58.22	Con	Lib	NDP	40.08	27.73	20.29	–	8.78	2.64	0.48	12.35
ON	Bruce—Grey—Owen Sound	64.09	Con	Lib	NDP	49.18	25.23	13.59	–	8.04	3.06	0.90	23.95
ON	Burlington	69.69	Lib	Con	NDP	37.25	45.73	10.86	–	4.00	1.98	0.18	8.48
ON	Burlington North—Milton West	65.45	Lib	Con	NDP	36.60	47.89	9.60	–	3.96	1.94	–	11.30
ON	Cambridge	60.98	Lib	Con	NDP	34.14	38.24	17.09	–	7.15	3.39	–	4.10
ON	Carleton	75.83	Con	Lib	NDP	51.86	31.86	11.37	–	2.75	2.15	0.01	19.99
ON	Chatham-Kent—Leamington	63.35	Con	Lib	PPC	42.43	26.74	14.61	–	14.71	1.52	–	15.70
ON	Davenport	60.26	Lib	NDP	Con	10.85	43.60	39.57	–	3.27	2.40	0.31	4.03
ON	Don Valley North	56.00	Lib	Con	NDP	32.54	52.77	9.92	–	2.95	1.81	0.01	20.23
ON	Don Valley West	64.34	Lib	Con	NDP	29.91	57.23	9.16	–	2.54	1.06	0.11	27.32
ON	Dufferin—Caledon	61.61	Con	Lib	NDP	49.04	28.63	10.38	–	7.12	4.51	0.33	20.42
ON	Eglinton—Lawrence	61.78	Lib	Con	NDP	36.45	48.48	9.16	–	2.91	3.00	–	12.03
ON	Elgin—St. Thomas—London South	64.20	Con	Lib	NDP	49.25	19.65	16.18	–	12.18	2.21	0.53	29.60
ON	Essex	66.64	Con	NDP	Lib	40.96	15.45	31.66	–	10.20	1.23	0.49	9.31
ON	Etobicoke Centre	63.38	Lib	Con	NDP	34.09	48.14	10.76	–	6.59	0.32	0.11	14.04
ON	Etobicoke—Lakeshore	62.99	Lib	Con	NDP	32.47	47.14	13.49	–	4.40	2.12	0.39	14.67
ON	Etobicoke North	50.84	Lib	Con	NDP	25.44	58.88	10.54	–	4.34	–	0.80	33.44
ON	Flamborough—Glanbrook—Brant North	68.12	Con	Lib	NDP	43.78	32.54	14.62	–	6.53	2.44	0.09	11.25
ON	Guelph	64.75	Lib	Con	NDP	23.45	41.37	22.02	–	4.66	7.85	0.66	17.92
ON	Haldimand—Norfolk	66.86	Con	Lib	NDP	47.39	27.52	13.29	–	10.50	–	1.30	19.87
ON	Haliburton—Kawartha Lakes	66.54	Con	Lib	NDP	51.97	23.87	14.23	–	6.85	2.46	0.62	28.11
ON	Hamilton Centre	55.71	NDP	Lib	Con	16.52	26.73	46.96	–	6.57	2.66	0.57	20.23
ON	Hamilton East—Stoney Creek	59.26	Lib	Con	NDP	30.12	39.07	21.68	–	7.26	1.86	–	8.95
ON	Hamilton Mountain	60.99	Lib	NDP	Con	25.05	34.50	31.56	–	6.32	2.00	0.59	2.94
ON	Hamilton West—Ancaster—Dundas	69.57	Lib	Con	NDP	29.07	44.30	19.71	–	4.10	2.61	0.21	15.23
ON	Hastings—Lennox and Addington—Tyendinaga	66.04	Con	Lib	NDP	45.58	34.47	11.04	–	5.68	1.78	1.44	11.11
ON	Humber River—Black Creek	48.93	Lib	Con	NDP	17.40	60.69	16.40	–	3.91	1.21	0.40	43.29
ON	Huron—Bruce	69.72	Con	Lib	NDP	50.93	26.17	14.80	–	7.25	–	0.85	24.76
ON	Kanata	72.51	Lib	Con	NDP	36.85	43.16	14.69	–	2.76	2.54	–	6.31
ON	Kapuskasing—Timmins—Mushkegowuk	54.89	NDP	Lib	Con	25.18	26.22	35.79	–	12.27	0.40	0.14	9.57
ON	Kenora—Kiiwetinoong	56.66	Con	NDP	Lib	43.32	19.85	29.14	–	6.31	1.39	–	14.18
ON	Kingston and the Islands	66.91	Lib	NDP	Con	24.55	40.69	28.80	–	3.49	2.46	0.01	11.89
ON	King—Vaughan	50.59	Con	Lib	NDP	44.86	42.90	6.62	–	4.35	1.27	–	1.96
ON	Kitchener Centre	62.90	Green	Con	NDP	24.84	17.36	17.50	–	6.65	33.37	0.28	8.53
ON	Kitchener—Conestoga	67.73	Lib	Con	NDP	37.64	38.29	11.93	–	7.22	4.91	0.01	0.65
ON	Kitchener South—Hespeler	61.82	Lib	Con	NDP	35.54	37.45	16.27	–	6.75	3.44	0.54	1.91
ON	Lanark—Frontenac	70.09	Con	Lib	NDP	49.69	25.83	15.25	–	6.21	2.68	0.34	23.86
ON	Leeds—Grenville—Thousand Islands—Rideau Lakes	68.17	Con	Lib	NDP	50.53	25.20	14.95	–	5.73	3.60	–	25.33
ON	London Centre	59.96	Lib	NDP	Con	24.80	37.55	30.38	–	5.15	1.96	0.15	7.17
ON	London—Fanshawe	56.29	NDP	Con	Lib	24.27	23.05	43.50	–	9.18	–	–	19.23
ON	London West	68.29	Lib	Con	NDP	34.15	36.87	22.88	–	4.99	–	1.11	2.72
ON	Markham—Stouffville	59.39	Lib	Con	NDP	34.75	51.55	8.79	–	2.94	1.97	–	16.80
ON	Markham—Thornhill	56.06	Lib	Con	NDP	26.38	61.54	8.36	–	1.72	2.00	–	35.15
ON	Markham—Unionville	52.27	Lib	Con	NDP	42.43	48.23	6.55	–	–	2.79	–	5.80
ON	Middlesex—London	68.01	Con	Lib	NDP	45.25	27.16	17.85	–	7.76	1.81	0.17	18.10
ON	Milton East—Halton Hills South	63.82	Lib	Con	NDP	41.25	41.71	9.57	–	4.88	2.60	–	0.46
ON	Mississauga Centre	55.01	Lib	Con	NDP	28.85	53.88	11.32	–	4.19	1.62	0.13	25.03
ON	Mississauga East—Cooksville	56.08	Lib	Con	NDP	31.60	50.28	10.50	–	6.45	0.32	0.84	18.67
ON	Mississauga—Erin Mills	58.12	Lib	Con	NDP	33.51	51.19	10.30	–	3.36	1.63	–	17.68
ON	Mississauga—Lakeshore	63.52	Lib	Con	NDP	38.58	45.01	9.77	–	4.26	2.20	0.18	6.43
ON	Mississauga—Malton	54.44	Lib	Con	NDP	30.79	52.68	13.74	–	0.30	1.86	0.63	21.89
ON	Mississauga—Streetsville	59.13	Lib	Con	NDP	34.32	47.34	12.09	–	3.73	2.13	0.39	13.02
ON	Nepean	70.62	Lib	Con	NDP	33.37	45.74	16.22	–	2.73	1.94	–	12.37
ON	Newmarket—Aurora	60.44	Lib	Con	NDP	38.16	43.78	11.55	–	4.19	1.84	0.48	5.62
ON	New Tecumseth—Gwillimbury	57.01	Con	Lib	NDP	47.67	30.27	13.05	–	7.49	1.24	0.28	17.40
ON	Niagara Falls—Niagara-on-the-Lake	61.85	Con	Lib	NDP	37.42	35.19	17.85	–	7.58	1.95	–	2.23
ON	Niagara South	62.53	Con	Lib	NDP	33.41	32.96	22.79	–	8.95	1.90	–	0.45
ON	Niagara West	70.41	Con	Lib	NDP	44.03	31.05	13.97	–	7.09	2.80	1.05	12.98
ON	Nipissing—Timiskaming	62.72	Lib	Con	NDP	31.88	36.86	23.33	–	7.93	–	–	4.98
ON	Northumberland—Clarke	69.74	Con	Lib	NDP	43.99	34.02	13.95	–	5.48	2.57	–	9.97
ON	Oakville East	67.10	Lib	Con	NDP	39.43	46.22	9.40	–	3.31	1.64	–	6.78
ON	Oakville West	67.54	Lib	Con	NDP	38.47	47.49	8.70	–	3.62	1.72	–	9.02
ON	Orléans	70.85	Lib	Con	NDP	28.67	52.34	14.45	–	2.64	1.62	0.28	23.67
ON	Oshawa	56.29	Con	NDP	Lib	39.71	23.12	28.50	–	7.14	1.53	–	11.22
ON	Ottawa Centre	74.55	Lib	NDP	Con	16.28	45.24	32.71	–	2.24	2.80	0.74	12.53
ON	Ottawa South	65.76	Lib	Con	NDP	26.97	49.41	18.12	–	3.09	2.20	0.21	22.45
ON	Ottawa—Vanier—Gloucester	65.23	Lib	NDP	Con	20.54	49.00	23.26	–	3.19	3.05	0.96	25.74
ON	Ottawa West—Nepean	68.64	Lib	Con	NDP	27.67	45.42	20.22	–	3.20	2.89	0.61	17.75
ON	Oxford	64.82	Con	Lib	NDP	46.79	20.67	18.44	–	10.64	2.70	0.76	26.11
ON	Parry Sound—Muskoka	64.67	Con	Lib	NDP	47.93	21.65	16.83	–	7.54	5.58	0.48	26.28
ON	Perth—Wellington	65.56	Con	Lib	NDP	48.55	24.62	17.19	–	9.64	–	–	23.93
ON	Peterborough	69.03	Con	Lib	NDP	39.19	34.82	19.16	–	4.31	2.23	0.28	4.37
ON	Pickering—Brooklin	60.39	Lib	Con	NDP	34.26	48.16	13.48	–	3.85	0.25	–	13.90
ON	Prescott—Russell—Cumberland	70.26	Lib	Con	NDP	32.40	47.22	10.80	–	6.42	2.04	1.12	14.81
ON	Richmond Hill South	54.86	Lib	Con	NDP	38.76	47.83	8.75	–	2.95	–	1.71	9.07
ON	Sarnia—Lambton—Bkejwanong	66.71	Con	NDP	Lib	46.50	19.39	20.99	–	11.00	1.49	0.63	25.51
ON	Sault Ste. Marie—Algoma	61.10	Con	Lib	NDP	35.59	32.36	25.89	–	5.24	0.63	0.28	3.23
ON	Scarborough—Agincourt	53.00	Lib	Con	NDP	29.17	56.24	10.08	–	2.79	1.72	–	27.07
ON	Scarborough Centre—Don Valley East	56.12	Lib	Con	NDP	25.32	56.32	13.75	–	4.26	–	0.36	30.99
ON	Scarborough—Guildwood—Rouge Park	60.76	Lib	Con	NDP	22.07	61.28	13.38	–	3.01	–	0.26	39.22
ON	Scarborough North	51.33	Lib	Con	NDP	18.09	66.98	11.59	–	2.43	–	0.90	48.89
ON	Scarborough Southwest	57.17	Lib	Con	NDP	20.59	57.96	15.99	–	2.88	2.25	0.33	37.36
ON	Scarborough—Woburn	56.13	Lib	Con	NDP	22.55	60.41	13.16	–	3.08	–	0.81	37.86
ON	Simcoe—Grey	64.71	Con	Lib	NDP	47.42	27.88	13.17	–	6.94	4.15	0.43	19.54
ON	Simcoe North	62.40	Con	Lib	NDP	42.18	30.83	15.96	–	7.65	3.05	0.33	11.35
ON	Spadina—Harbourfront	52.98	Lib	NDP	Con	21.70	38.23	33.84	–	3.02	3.22	–	4.39
ON	St. Catharines	64.57	Lib	Con	NDP	32.37	37.87	21.31	–	6.59	1.87	–	5.50
ON	Stormont—Dundas—Glengarry	62.45	Con	Lib	NDP	54.32	24.71	10.90	–	7.67	2.32	0.08	29.61
ON	Sudbury	61.93	Lib	NDP	Con	27.82	34.98	28.90	–	6.12	1.98	0.20	6.08
ON	Sudbury East—Manitoulin—Nickel Belt	62.27	Lib	NDP	Con	26.91	31.98	30.34	–	8.90	1.73	0.14	1.65
ON	Taiaiko'n—Parkdale—High Park	64.79	Lib	NDP	Con	13.33	42.79	38.40	–	3.20	1.89	0.39	4.40
ON	Thornhill	57.38	Con	Lib	NDP	51.72	36.06	5.97	–	4.60	1.64	–	15.66
ON	Thunder Bay—Rainy River	61.17	Lib	Con	NDP	29.28	34.26	28.45	–	6.58	1.43	–	4.98
ON	Thunder Bay—Superior North	62.80	Lib	NDP	Con	23.96	40.40	27.71	–	5.89	1.77	0.26	12.69
ON	Toronto Centre	56.86	Lib	NDP	Con	12.93	49.83	26.25	–	2.35	8.05	0.59	23.59
ON	Toronto—Danforth	65.47	Lib	NDP	Con	12.56	48.36	33.67	–	2.46	1.96	1.00	14.69
ON	Toronto—St. Paul's	66.13	Lib	Con	NDP	26.51	49.51	15.89	–	2.50	5.56	0.03	23.00
ON	University—Rosedale	59.12	Lib	NDP	Con	17.94	46.48	28.07	–	2.59	4.44	0.47	18.41
ON	Vaughan—Woodbridge	57.21	Lib	Con	NDP	40.27	46.15	6.93	–	5.39	0.96	0.31	5.88
ON	Waterloo	67.34	Lib	Con	NDP	27.44	45.48	19.12	–	4.55	3.41	–	18.04
ON	Wellington—Halton Hills North	68.11	Con	Lib	NDP	46.78	30.25	11.96	–	6.19	4.70	0.12	16.53
ON	Whitby	61.19	Lib	Con	NDP	34.48	45.09	14.41	–	4.40	1.61	–	10.61
ON	Willowdale	54.47	Lib	Con	NDP	33.86	51.19	10.29	–	2.68	1.98	–	17.34
ON	Windsor—Tecumseh—Lakeshore	60.96	Lib	NDP	Con	27.03	30.88	30.30	–	10.29	1.21	0.29	0.58
ON	Windsor West	53.10	NDP	Lib	Con	19.34	27.77	44.24	–	8.34	–	0.31	16.46
ON	York Centre	53.37	Lib	Con	NDP	37.85	47.29	10.18	–	4.68	–	–	9.44
ON	York—Durham	62.09	Con	Lib	NDP	51.75	28.50	12.57	–	6.37	0.55	0.26	23.25
ON	York South—Weston—Etobicoke	52.02	Lib	Con	NDP	22.48	55.58	15.09	–	4.94	1.91	0.01	33.10
MB	Brandon—Souris	61.55	Con	NDP	Lib	59.37	11.94	20.39	–	8.22	0.02	0.05	38.98
MB	Churchill—Keewatinook Aski	35.82	NDP	Lib	Con	24.17	25.18	42.56	–	5.02	3.08	–	17.39
MB	Elmwood—Transcona	59.46	NDP	Con	Lib	28.45	14.88	49.12	–	5.95	1.59	0.01	20.67
MB	Kildonan—St. Paul	66.36	Con	Lib	NDP	42.45	27.91	23.80	–	5.42	0.31	0.12	14.54
MB	Portage—Lisgar	66.56	Con	PPC	NDP	52.15	10.97	13.42	–	21.88	–	1.58	30.27
MB	Provencher	66.15	Con	PPC	Lib	48.34	16.50	12.21	–	17.49	2.56	2.90	30.85
MB	Riding Mountain	61.23	Con	NDP	Lib	59.19	12.74	14.51	–	10.55	2.11	0.90	44.68
MB	St. Boniface—St. Vital	66.12	Lib	Con	NDP	28.29	43.90	21.17	–	4.32	1.50	0.82	15.61
MB	Selkirk—Interlake—Eastman	65.48	Con	NDP	Lib	56.97	13.24	19.43	–	7.67	2.69	–	37.55
MB	Winnipeg Centre	49.74	NDP	Lib	Con	12.80	28.95	49.65	–	4.28	2.39	1.92	20.70
MB	Winnipeg North	52.93	Lib	NDP	Con	13.49	53.21	27.75	–	4.04	1.23	0.29	25.46
MB	Winnipeg South	67.23	Lib	Con	NDP	32.70	48.15	14.34	–	3.34	1.48	–	15.45
MB	Winnipeg South Centre	69.70	Lib	Con	NDP	28.12	45.29	20.67	–	2.81	2.65	0.46	17.17
MB	Winnipeg West	69.34	Con	Lib	NDP	40.35	39.24	14.91	–	3.42	2.06	0.02	1.10
SK	Battlefords—Lloydminster—Meadow Lake	58.18	Con	NDP	Lib	67.26	7.32	12.91	–	5.99	0.78	5.74	54.35
SK	Carlton Trail—Eagle Creek	70.05	Con	NDP	PPC	68.00	5.47	14.04	–	9.26	0.93	2.29	53.97
SK	Desnethé—Missinippi—Churchill River	32.96	Lib	NDP	Con	23.57	46.35	24.02	–	3.13	1.17	1.78	22.33
SK	Moose Jaw—Lake Centre—Lanigan	69.16	Con	NDP	PPC	60.99	6.03	18.93	–	11.32	1.03	1.70	42.06
SK	Prince Albert	58.55	Con	NDP	Lib	64.09	11.81	15.02	–	6.88	1.10	1.11	49.07
SK	Regina—Lewvan	67.14	Con	NDP	Lib	46.16	14.30	34.81	–	3.50	1.24	–	11.35
SK	Regina—Qu'Appelle	60.07	Con	NDP	Lib	60.28	10.23	22.67	–	4.93	1.89	–	37.61
SK	Regina—Wascana	63.73	Con	Lib	NDP	49.90	26.92	18.07	–	3.50	1.61	–	22.98
SK	Saskatoon South	67.99	Con	NDP	Lib	49.25	14.37	30.63	–	4.52	1.23	–	18.62
SK	Saskatoon—University	68.33	Con	NDP	Lib	47.92	10.86	35.40	–	4.18	0.95	0.69	12.53
SK	Saskatoon West	55.59	Con	NDP	Lib	45.37	8.19	39.30	–	6.09	1.05	–	6.06
SK	Souris—Moose Mountain	76.13	Con	PPC	NDP	76.01	4.20	8.05	–	9.17	0.06	2.51	66.84
SK	Swift Current—Grasslands—Kindersley	68.55	Con	NDP	PPC	72.46	4.11	10.27	–	7.58	0.84	4.74	62.18
SK	Yorkton—Melville	65.62	Con	NDP	PPC	68.79	6.31	12.11	–	9.21	1.74	1.84	56.68
AB	Airdrie—Cochrane	69.38	Con	NDP	Lib	59.90	10.16	14.92	–	8.23	1.26	5.52	44.97
AB	Battle River—Crowfoot	71.51	Con	NDP	PPC	71.38	4.26	9.70	–	9.33	0.91	4.42	61.68
AB	Bow River	62.39	Con	PPC	NDP	69.57	7.86	9.37	–	9.85	–	3.35	59.72
AB	Calgary Centre	62.16	Con	Lib	NDP	50.92	30.06	16.42	–	–	1.63	0.97	20.85
AB	Calgary Confederation	67.19	Con	Lib	NDP	45.69	27.89	17.72	–	4.64	3.68	0.38	17.80
AB	Calgary Crowfoot	67.61	Con	Lib	NDP	54.94	21.69	16.18	–	4.63	1.68	0.87	33.25
AB	Calgary East	53.48	Con	Lib	NDP	52.86	18.54	18.08	–	7.17	2.12	1.24	34.32
AB	Calgary Heritage	66.35	Con	NDP	Lib	58.32	16.19	17.28	–	5.11	1.42	1.67	41.05
AB	Calgary McKnight	51.55	Lib	Con	NDP	34.22	43.76	16.18	–	3.94	1.13	0.77	9.54
AB	Calgary Midnapore	67.70	Con	NDP	Lib	60.27	12.46	18.54	–	6.09	1.34	1.31	41.73
AB	Calgary Nose Hill	62.88	Con	Lib	NDP	55.32	20.23	16.92	–	4.80	1.62	1.12	35.09
AB	Calgary Shepard	65.39	Con	NDP	Lib	61.20	13.92	16.03	–	5.73	1.70	1.42	45.17
AB	Calgary Signal Hill	68.32	Con	Lib	NDP	59.81	19.38	14.13	–	4.04	1.70	0.93	40.43
AB	Calgary Skyview	55.97	Con	Lib	NDP	44.96	33.12	16.53	–	3.74	0.91	0.73	11.84
AB	Edmonton Centre	59.94	Con	Lib	NDP	32.60	31.21	30.41	–	4.86	0.11	0.81	1.39
AB	Edmonton Gateway	62.36	Con	Lib	NDP	43.12	25.41	25.32	–	5.66	0.21	0.27	17.70
AB	Edmonton Griesbach	53.43	NDP	Con	Lib	36.31	15.17	40.36	–	5.94	1.13	1.08	4.05
AB	Edmonton Manning	55.06	Con	NDP	Lib	41.12	20.57	31.01	–	7.01	–	0.28	10.11
AB	Edmonton Northwest	58.74	Con	NDP	Lib	43.10	22.87	27.63	–	6.24	0.03	0.13	15.47
AB	Edmonton Riverbend	65.03	Con	Lib	NDP	45.44	24.93	24.43	–	4.02	1.15	0.04	20.51
AB	Edmonton Southeast	62.57	Con	Lib	NDP	37.70	34.00	22.32	–	5.68	–	0.29	3.70
AB	Edmonton Strathcona	69.14	NDP	Con	Lib	26.77	9.02	57.95	–	4.52	1.25	0.49	31.18
AB	Edmonton West	64.13	Con	NDP	Lib	45.62	24.45	24.52	–	5.10	0.05	0.27	21.10
AB	Foothills	69.24	Con	NDP	PPC	68.43	6.94	11.39	–	8.21	1.32	3.70	57.03
AB	Fort McMurray—Cold Lake	56.25	Con	PPC	NDP	67.81	7.07	10.12	–	12.70	0.98	1.32	55.11
AB	Grande Prairie	64.25	Con	NDP	PPC	68.96	4.22	11.85	–	10.20	–	4.77	57.11
AB	Lakeland	66.85	Con	PPC	NDP	69.40	4.96	10.51	–	11.06	0.88	3.19	58.34
AB	Leduc—Wetaskiwin	66.69	Con	NDP	PPC	63.37	7.10	17.60	–	11.20	0.02	0.71	45.77
AB	Lethbridge	65.23	Con	NDP	Lib	55.65	15.14	19.31	–	6.95	–	2.96	36.34
AB	Medicine Hat—Cardston—Warner	62.60	Con	NDP	PPC	65.80	7.07	13.89	–	9.32	1.38	2.55	51.90
AB	Parkland	69.64	Con	NDP	PPC	63.09	6.24	16.28	–	11.28	–	3.11	46.81
AB	Peace River—Westlock	61.27	Con	NDP	PPC	62.65	5.48	13.16	–	12.53	0.75	5.42	49.49
AB	Ponoka—Didsbury	71.65	Con	PPC	NDP	67.87	4.65	10.95	–	13.36	–	3.16	54.52
AB	Red Deer	64.92	Con	NDP	PPC	60.51	8.17	17.35	–	11.29	–	2.68	43.15
AB	Sherwood Park—Fort Saskatchewan	73.46	Con	NDP	Lib	57.55	12.23	20.64	–	7.01	0.98	1.59	36.91
AB	St. Albert—Sturgeon River	71.62	Con	NDP	Lib	56.03	11.38	23.55	–	7.80	–	1.23	32.48
AB	Yellowhead	68.45	Con	NDP	Lib	60.23	10.62	14.67	–	9.25	1.25	3.98	45.57
BC	Abbotsford—South Langley	58.87	Con	Lib	NDP	45.59	26.05	18.22	–	7.00	3.14	–	19.54
BC	Burnaby Central	50.68	NDP	Lib	Con	22.16	31.25	39.78	–	3.38	2.92	0.52	8.53
BC	Burnaby North—Seymour	63.44	Lib	Con	NDP	26.56	40.88	26.52	–	2.65	3.39	–	14.32
BC	Cariboo—Prince George	61.33	Con	NDP	Lib	51.17	16.26	20.40	–	8.21	3.48	0.47	30.77
BC	Chilliwack—Hope	60.85	Con	NDP	Lib	45.99	17.12	26.42	–	7.65	2.81	–	19.57
BC	Cloverdale—Langley City	61.04	Lib	Con	NDP	36.12	39.10	19.96	–	4.82	–	–	2.98
BC	Columbia—Kootenay—Southern Rockies	67.59	Con	NDP	Lib	43.62	8.94	36.64	–	7.09	3.71	–	6.98
BC	Coquitlam—Port Coquitlam	59.84	Lib	Con	NDP	30.12	37.92	27.60	–	4.37	–	–	7.80
BC	Courtenay—Alberni	65.16	NDP	Con	Lib	31.30	13.61	42.88	–	5.00	7.05	0.16	11.57
BC	Cowichan—Malahat—Langford	63.96	NDP	Con	Lib	28.36	16.38	42.78	–	6.27	6.22	–	14.43
BC	Delta	67.10	Lib	Con	NDP	33.54	42.54	18.45	–	2.48	2.23	0.76	9.00
BC	Esquimalt—Saanich—Sooke	63.79	NDP	Lib	Con	20.97	21.88	43.23	–	4.65	8.89	0.38	21.35
BC	Fleetwood—Port Kells	57.31	Lib	Con	NDP	28.53	45.93	20.34	–	2.89	1.92	0.39	17.40
BC	Kamloops—Shuswap—Central Rockies	67.22	Con	NDP	Lib	45.01	16.61	25.04	–	8.15	5.09	0.10	19.98
BC	Kamloops—Thompson—Nicola	63.56	Con	NDP	Lib	43.50	17.70	28.56	–	5.97	3.76	0.52	14.94
BC	Kelowna	61.89	Con	Lib	NDP	42.31	26.24	21.15	–	7.29	3.01	–	16.07
BC	Langley Township—Fraser Heights	63.75	Con	Lib	NDP	43.92	29.58	19.53	–	4.50	2.42	0.05	14.34
BC	Mission—Matsqui—Abbotsford	63.48	Con	Lib	NDP	47.12	24.22	17.99	–	6.97	3.71	–	22.91
BC	Nanaimo—Ladysmith	63.32	NDP	Con	Green	26.58	13.18	29.38	–	5.01	25.85	–	2.79
BC	New Westminster—Burnaby—Maillardville	58.75	NDP	Lib	Con	21.02	23.44	47.98	–	3.74	3.79	0.03	24.55
BC	North Island—Powell River	65.49	NDP	Con	Lib	36.22	13.30	39.46	–	4.56	5.86	0.59	3.24
BC	North Vancouver—Capilano	64.67	Lib	Con	NDP	29.38	44.69	19.05	–	2.57	4.27	0.03	15.31
BC	Okanagan Lake West—South Kelowna	65.68	Con	Lib	NDP	48.35	23.22	18.89	–	6.79	2.75	–	25.13
BC	Pitt Meadows—Maple Ridge	64.00	Con	NDP	Lib	37.14	24.65	31.29	–	5.53	0.29	1.10	5.85
BC	Port Moody—Coquitlam	63.25	NDP	Con	Lib	31.96	29.48	35.04	–	3.32	–	0.20	3.08
BC	Prince George—Peace River—Northern Rockies	60.27	Con	NDP	PPC	59.33	9.25	14.37	–	10.40	3.48	3.17	44.96
BC	Richmond Centre—Marpole	46.55	Lib	Con	NDP	35.45	38.58	20.38	–	2.46	3.13	–	3.12
BC	Richmond East—Steveston	52.88	Lib	Con	NDP	33.99	41.91	19.38	–	2.38	2.34	–	7.92
BC	Saanich—Gulf Islands	69.77	Green	Con	NDP	22.65	18.81	19.55	–	3.01	35.77	0.22	13.12
BC	Similkameen—South Okanagan—West Kootenay	65.09	NDP	Con	Lib	37.58	13.23	38.97	–	6.87	3.35	–	1.39
BC	Skeena—Bulkley Valley	55.20	NDP	Con	PPC	36.14	7.66	42.58	–	7.72	3.76	2.13	6.44
BC	South Surrey—White Rock	64.75	Con	Lib	NDP	42.44	38.90	14.80	–	3.86	–	–	3.54
BC	Surrey Centre	52.32	Lib	NDP	Con	20.66	44.63	27.57	–	3.86	2.21	1.07	17.07
BC	Surrey Newton	55.67	Lib	NDP	Con	15.22	54.43	26.08	–	2.61	–	1.66	28.35
BC	Vancouver Centre	55.52	Lib	NDP	Con	21.90	40.67	30.34	–	3.28	3.81	–	10.33
BC	Vancouver East	54.85	NDP	Lib	Con	10.89	19.76	56.40	–	2.79	7.72	2.46	36.64
BC	Vancouver Fraserview—South Burnaby	53.50	Lib	NDP	Con	21.88	42.32	31.10	–	2.99	1.01	0.70	11.22
BC	Vancouver Granville	62.17	Lib	NDP	Con	24.66	37.23	32.91	–	2.38	2.73	0.09	4.31
BC	Vancouver Kingsway	54.28	NDP	Lib	Con	14.14	29.02	50.40	–	2.20	3.63	0.60	21.38
BC	Vancouver Quadra	61.89	Lib	Con	NDP	29.22	43.39	19.39	–	2.03	5.96	–	14.17
BC	Vernon—Lake Country—Monashee	64.09	Con	NDP	Lib	43.83	19.77	21.71	–	9.51	5.18	–	22.11
BC	Victoria	66.45	NDP	Lib	Con	13.71	27.26	43.90	–	3.09	11.19	0.84	16.64
BC	West Vancouver—Sunshine Coast—Sea to Sky Country	65.13	Lib	Con	NDP	29.14	33.05	26.89	–	3.76	6.80	0.37	3.91
Terr	Yukon	64.13	Lib	Con	NDP	26.26	33.35	22.44	–	–	4.36	13.60	7.09
Terr	Northwest Territories	46.69	Lib	NDP	Con	14.41	38.22	32.34	–	–	2.33	12.71	5.88
Terr	Nunavut	33.80	NDP	Lib	Con	16.47	35.86	47.67	–	–	–	–	11.81

== See also ==
- 2012 Canadian federal electoral redistribution
