= Kelowna-Lake Country =

Kelowna-Lake Country can refer to one of two electoral districts in British Columbia, Canada:

- Kelowna—Lake Country (federal electoral district), a federal electoral district in use from 2003 to 2023
- Kelowna-Lake Country (provincial electoral district), a provincial electoral district in use since 2001
