= Kelowna (electoral district) =

Federal electoral district in British Columbia, Canada

British Columbia electoral district
- Interactive map of riding boundaries from the 2025 federal election

Federal electoral district
- Legislature: House of Commons
MP
Stephen Fuhr
Liberal
- District created: 1996
- First contested: 2025
- Last contested: 2025
- District webpage: profile, map

Demographics
- Population (2011): 110,051
- Electors (2019): 99,992
- Area (km²): 1,670
- Pop. density (per km²): 65.9
- Census subdivision: Kelowna (part)

Kelowna is a federal electoral district in the Canadian province of British Columbia, Canada, that was created as a result of the 2022 Canadian federal electoral redistribution. It was first contested in the 2025 Canadian federal election.

== Geography ==
Under the 2022 Canadian federal electoral redistribution, the district was created from portions of Kelowna—Lake Country, Vernon—Lake Country—Monashee, and Okanagan Lake West—South Kelowna.

== Demographics ==
Panethnic groups in Kelowna (2011−2021)
Panethnic group	2021		2016		2011	
Panethnic group	Pop.	%	Pop.	%	Pop.	%
European (Note: Statistic includes all persons that did not make up part of a visible minority or an indigenous identity.)	109,310	81.22%	100,480	85.46%	96,565	89.09%
Indigenous	7,940	5.9%	6,605	5.62%	4,540	4.19%
South Asian	5,955	4.42%	3,170	2.7%	2,505	2.31%
East Asian (Note: Statistic includes total responses of "Chinese", "Korean", and "Japanese" under visible minority section on census.)	4,005	2.98%	3,045	2.59%	2,340	2.16%
Southeast Asian (Note: Statistic includes total responses of "Filipino" and "Southeast Asian" under visible minority section on census.)	2,880	2.14%	1,800	1.53%	920	0.85%
African	1,515	1.13%	825	0.7%	420	0.39%
Latin American	1,090	0.81%	655	0.56%	475	0.44%
Middle Eastern (Note: Statistic includes total responses of "West Asian" and "Arab" under visible minority section on census.)	995	0.74%	455	0.39%	225	0.21%
Other (Note: Statistic includes total responses of "Visible minority, n.i.e." and "Multiple visible minorities" under visible minority section on census.)	875	0.65%	520	0.44%	400	0.37%
Total responses	134,580	98.75%	117,570	98.48%	108,390	98.49%
Total population	136,290	100%	119,388	100%	110,051	100%
Notes: Totals greater than 100% due to multiple origin responses. Demographics based on 2012 Canadian federal electoral redistribution riding boundaries.

== Members of Parliament ==
Kelowna
Parliament	Years	Member	Party
Riding created from Okanagan Centre
36th	1997–2000	Werner Schmidt	Reform
36th	2000–2000	Werner Schmidt	Alliance
37th	2000–2003	Werner Schmidt	Alliance
37th	2003–2004	Werner Schmidt	Conservative
Kelowna; Riding created from Kelowna–Lake Country, Vernon—Lake Country—Monashee, and Okanagan Lake West—South Kelowna.
45th	2025–present	Stephen Fuhr	Liberal

== Election results ==
=== Kelowna, 2023–present ===
2025 Canadian federal election
Party	Candidate	Votes	%	±%	Expenditures
Liberal	Stephen Fuhr	28,702	48.78	+22.54	$118,108.03
Conservative	Tracy Gray	27,620	46.94	+4.63	$116,654.48
New Democratic	Trevor McAleese	1,941	3.30	–17.85	$12,285.91
Green	Catriona Wright	578	0.98	–2.03	none listed
Total valid votes/expense limit		58,841	99.34	–	$129,900.20
Total rejected ballots		392	0.66	+0.36	
Turnout		59,233	70.20	+8.07	
Eligible voters		84,374			
Liberal gain from Conservative		Swing		+8.96	
Source: Elections Canada

2021 federal election redistributed results
Party	Vote	%
Conservative	21,407	42.31
Liberal	13,277	26.24
New Democratic	10,702	21.15
People's	3,686	7.29
Green	1,525	3.01

=== Kelowna, 1996–2003 ===
Graph of election results in Kelowna (minor parties that never got 2% of the vote or didn't run consistently are omitted)

2000 Canadian federal election
Party	Candidate	Votes	%	±%	Expenditures
Alliance	Werner Schmidt	33,810	59.47	+9.46	$44,990
Liberal	Joe Leask	13,564	23.86	+1.46	$46,876
Progressive Conservative	Doug Mallo	4,708	8.28	–8.51	$9,791
New Democratic	John O. Powell	3,572	6.28	–1.32	$9,493
Canadian Action	Jack William Peach	1,199	2.11	–	$3,652
Total valid votes		56,853	99.61		
Total rejected ballots		223	0.39	+0.15	
Turnout		57,076	64.02	+1.21	
Eligible voters		89,153			
Alliance hold		Swing		+3.50	
Source: Elections Canada

1997 Canadian federal election
Party	Candidate	Votes	%	Expenditures
Reform	Werner Schmidt	25,246	50.01	$48,355
Liberal	Janna Francis	11,306	22.40	$32,838
Progressive Conservative	Al Horning	8,477	16.79	$47,498
New Democratic	Fred Steele	3,838	7.60	$11,443
Green	David Hughes	1,612	3.19	$1,014
Total valid votes		50,479	99.76	
Total rejected ballots		123	0.24	
Turnout		50,602	62.81	
Eligible voters		80,568		
Source: Elections Canada

== See also ==
- List of Canadian electoral districts
