= Norm Letnick =

Canadian politician

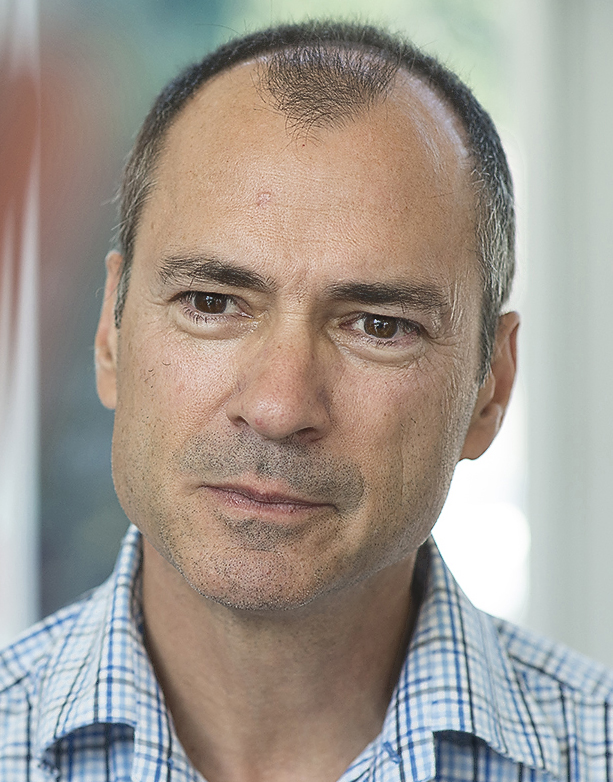

Member of the British Columbia Legislative Assembly for Kelowna-Lake Country
- In office May 12, 2009 – September 21, 2024
- Preceded by: Al Horning

Minister of Agriculture of British Columbia
- In office September 5, 2012 – July 18, 2017
- Premier: Christy Clark
- Preceded by: Don McRae
- Succeeded by: Lana Popham

Personal details
- Born: 1957 (age 68–69) Montreal, Quebec, Canada
- Party: BC Liberal
- Spouse: Helene
- Children: 3
- Occupation: Businessman, Professor, Retired Sept 2024

Norm Letnick (born 1957) is a Canadian politician, who was first elected as a member of the Legislative Assembly of British Columbia in the 2009 provincial election and re-elected in 2013, 2017, and 2020. During his terms in office, Letnick served over four years as British Columbia's minister of Agriculture, the longest period in this portfolio of any BC Liberal. He was elected as a member of the BC Liberal Party in the riding of Kelowna-Lake Country. While his party formed a majority government in the 39th Parliament, Letnick was not initially included in the cabinet but was appointed to several committees, including the Select Standing Committee on Health where he was chair and tasked to report on the impacts of baby boomers and alternative strategies on the health care system. Prior to being appointed assistant deputy speaker he served as opposition health critic for three years. During that time he worked in close collaboration with health minister Adrian Dix on many files but none more important than the 2020 COVID-19 pandemic response.

As a private member, Letnick also introduced one piece of legislation, the Emergency Intervention Disclosure Act, which was adopted by government. This was the first time in six years that a private member was successful in introducing and getting legislation passed in the legislature.

As the MLA for the Kelowna Lake Country riding Letnick worked in close collaboration with his municipal, provincial, and federal colleagues to deliver several important capital priorities to the region including a passing lane on Walker's Hill through Rutland on Highway 33, six laning and intersection improvements on Highway 97 from Highway 33 to Edward's Road, a new highway 97 from Winfield to Oyama, an expanded library at UBCO, the purchase of the rail trail from CN, expansion of Kelowna General Hospital, new Lake Country Middle School, and several new supportive housing projects.

Prior to his election to the legislature, he was a business professor at the Okanagan School of Business. He graduated from Heriot-Watt University with a master of business administration and achieved candidacy status toward a doctorate in health economics at the University of British Columbia before setting the pursuit of a PhD aside to focus on his public duties as minister of Agriculture. He served as a municipal councillor in the Town of Banff in the 1990s and in the City of Kelowna between 2005 and 2008.

== Background ==
Born and raised in Montreal, Letnick is fluent in English and French. Letnick earned a living as a businessman, starting up several businesses before selling them including two H&R Block franchises, a Motorola Dealership, a computer store and a video store. He married Helene in 1981 and they have three children and two grandchildren.

He graduated in 1980 from the University of Calgary with a Bachelor of Commerce Degree and a nomination for a Rhodes Scholarship and then in 2002 from Scotland's Heriot-Watt University with a Master of Business Administration degree. In 2011 the University of British Columbia conferred upon him candidacy for a PhD in Health Economics.

=== Banff ===
Letnick was elected to the municipal council in Banff, Alberta in 1992, and re-elected in 1995. In Banff, he was an advocate for affordable housing, proper land use planning, and increased commercial development. He served as the chairman of Banff council's housing advisory committee and became the charter president of the non-profit Banff Housing Corporation and served as such for six years. As president he led the Banff Housing Corporation delivering affordable housing. He campaigned in favour of developing Banff by an additional 850,000 square feet of commercial space during a town-wide plebiscite, which was supported by the residents but reduced by the federal Minister of Canadian Heritage, Sheila Copps, who had jurisdiction over the development of Banff. In 1991 Letnick was a member of the Banff Mineral Springs Hospital board of directors. He was appointed chairman in 1995. As chair Letnick lead the hospital board through a strategic planning process, the creation of a new service agreement with the Regional Health Authority, and the hiring of a new CEO. He also led an initiative to stop the hospital from offering morning after pills in accordance with the guidelines of the owners of the hospital the Catholic Health Association of Canada. However, the initiative met with significant opposition and was abandoned later that year. In 1998 the 40-year-old Letnick ran for mayor of Banff and was the pre-election favorite, but came second to a 51-year-old lawyer.

In Banff Letnick also served as president of the Banff Rotary Club, Secretary/Treasurer of the Banff Shrine Club, member of the Banff Lake Louise Tourism Bureau and member of the Knights of Columbus.

=== Kelowna ===
Letnick and his family moved to Kelowna, British Columbia in 1999 taking a faculty position at Okanagan University College teaching business administration. He participated in several community service organizations such as the Rotary and Gyro clubs. He was recruited to join Kelowna's Advisory Planning Commission, and was appointed to municipal task forces looking into access to the new Kelowna bridge and the downtown entertainment district. In the spring of 2005, with Member of Parliament Werner Schmidt announcing his retirement, Letnick sought the Conservative Party nomination in the Kelowna—Lake Country riding. Six other candidates ran, including Ben Stewart, Letnick placed second by 55 votes to Ron Cannan who went on to win the riding for the Conservatives. In the 2005 local government elections, he won a seat on the Kelowna City Council. In his efforts to get elected, Letnick campaign totalled $19,000 from cash and in-kind donations and visited an estimated 6,000 residents in a door-knocking campaign. Letnick was appointed to a two-person task force, with fellow councilor Michele Rule, to investigate and provide City Council with recommendations on affordable housing. In November 2006, they presented the results, eight recommendations which included density bonuses for developers and starting a municipal housing corporation. Based on the recommendations Kelowna council immediately decided to reserve 20% of a city-owned old school site for affordable housing development. On other local issues, Letnick voted against condominium development on agricultural land and voted in favour of holding a referendum on amalgamation with Westside which the council refused.

== Provincial politics ==
Letnick began positioning himself in April 2008 to run for provincial office, informing his MLA Sindi Hawkins who had been diagnosed with cancer, that he would seek to replace her if she did not seek re-election. However, it was retiring MLA Al Horning in a neighbouring riding that asked Letnick to replace him. Letnick accepted and, as no one else contested, he was acclaimed BC Liberal candidate in the Kelowna—Lake Country riding. In the May 2009 election, Letnick defeated the New Democratic candidate Matthew Reed who was an audio engineer and instructor, the BC Conservative Party candidate Mary-Ann Graham who was a Rutland café owner, the Green Party candidate Ryan Fugger who was a freelance software and web developer, and independent candidate and fruit farmer Alan Clarke. Letnick won his riding with 52% of the vote and his BC Liberal Party won its third consecutive majority government. In 2013 Letnick won his riding for a second term with 57% of the vote and was appointed parliamentary secretary to premier Clark responsible for Intergovernmental Affairs.

=== 39th Parliament ===
As the 39th Parliament began, Premier Gordon Campbell did not include Letnick in the cabinet. For the first two sessions Letnick was appointed to serve on two committees: the Select Standing Committee on Public Accounts, and the Select Standing Committee on Finance and Government Services. As part of the finance committee he traveled the province for public consultation regarding government budget prioritization. In the third and fourth sessions he was reassigned to the Select Standing Committee on Education and the Select Standing Committee on Parliamentary Reform, Ethical Conduct, Standing Orders and Private Bills - though neither committee was convened in third session and only the Select Standing Committee on Parliamentary Reform, Ethical Conduct, Standing Orders and Private Bills held a meeting in the fourth session. In Fall 2009 Letnick was appointed by Randy Hawes, fellow BC Liberal MLA and the Minister of State for Mining, to lead a committee investigating a management strategy for aggregate extraction and processing in the Central Okanagan area.

Letnick distinguished himself from the BC Liberals in November 2009 when he voted against their Assistance to Shelter Act which allowed police to use force in taking a person at risk to emergency shelters. Letnick voted against the bill as "a matter of conscience" saying that he supported the current methods used and that the act may dis-locate persons into unfamiliar parts of town without a means to return. He still stands as the only MLA in the legislature since 2009 who has voted against his party.

Letnick was a vocal proponent of independent power producers and of the Harmonized Sales Tax, though he delivered a local petition against the HST to the Legislative Assembly on behalf of some of the constituents in his riding and those of Westside Kelowna and Kelowna Mission. The unpopularity of the HST within his riding led to Letnick being included in a list of 24 MLAs, in June 2010, who the FightHST group would explore for potential recall. The group short-listed Letnick in their list of 18 MLAs, in September 2010, where they thought recall was possible — though the group did not follow through with the recall campaign with Letnick.

Following the resignation of party leader Gordon Campbell, the BC Liberal Party leadership election was held. Letnick endorsed George Abbott as soon as he entered the race, citing the respect Abbott has of people within and outside the party. Christy Clark won the leadership election and became Premier, but also did not include Letnick in her cabinet. However, Clark directed Letnick to chair the Select Standing Committee on Health with the specific task of assessing the sustainability of the health care system, given expected demographic trends, to 2036 and to report on potential alternative strategies.

In May 2011, Letnick introduced a private member bill called the Emergency Intervention Disclosure Act (M-210) into the Legislative Assembly. The bill would have enabled people, like emergency workers or victims of crimes, to obtain blood tests from people who had their bodily fluids come in contact with them. Letnick cited encouragement from fire fighters and paramedics, as well as a Clark campaign pledge to debate more private member bills, as reasons for bringing the proposed legislation forward.

Currently emergency workers and victims of crime who suspect they have been exposed to serious illness cannot determine their exposure until many months later, often past the window of preventative treatments. Because of this doubt, suspected exposed people usually ingest a concoction of prophylactic drugs, and they, with their families, carry the mental burden of uncertainty. This bill allows those individuals to ask the authorities to compel source individuals to get a blood test in a timely manner and, if a communicable disease is determined, to have the source individual's doctor communicate the results in confidence to the applicant's doctor.

— Norm Letnick May 31, 2011

The legislation only received first reading in the third session but Letnick brought it back in the fourth session as Bill M-204 in November 2011. Letnick's private members bill was picked up by government and passed unanimously as Bill 39 in May 2012, the first time in 6 years that a private member successfully introduced a Bill that became Law.

In September 2012 Letnick was appointed Minister of Agriculture for the province of British Columbia.

On November 22, 2023, Letnick announced that he would not be seeking a fifth term in the Legislature. As of May 6, 2024, he serves as the Shadow Minister for Children & Family Development.

== Electoral history ==
2020 British Columbia general election: Kelowna-Lake Country
Party	Candidate	Votes	%	±%	Expenditures
Liberal	Norm Letnick	14,679	55.73	−4.41	$42,026.78
New Democratic	Justin Kulik	7,121	27.04	+6.38	$977.00
Green	John Janmaat	3,833	14.55	−4.65	$4,490.00
Libertarian	Kyle Geronazzo	515	1.96	–	$0.00
Independent	Silverado Socrates	190	0.72	–	$0.00
Total valid votes		26,338	100.00	–	
Total rejected ballots					
Turnout					
Registered voters					
Source: Elections BC

2017 British Columbia general election: Kelowna-Lake Country
Party	Candidate	Votes	%	±%	Expenditures
Liberal	Norm Letnick	15,287	59.76	+2.98	$55,200
New Democratic	Erik Olesen	5,344	20.89	−3.91	$7,120
Green	Alison Shaw	4,951	19.35	+11.91	$16,300
Total valid votes		25,582	100.00		
Total rejected ballots		149	0.58		
Turnout		25,731	54.21		
Source: Elections BC

2013 British Columbia general election: Kelowna-Lake Country
Party	Candidate	Votes	%
Liberal	Norm Letnick	12,149	56.78
New Democratic	Mike Nuyens	5,306	24.80
Conservative	Graeme James	2,351	10.99
Green	Gary Adams	1,591	7.44
Total valid votes		21,397	100.00
Total rejected ballots		88	0.41
Turnout		21,485	47.71
Source: Elections BC

2009 British Columbia general election: Kelowna-Lake Country
Party	Candidate	Votes	%	Expenditures
Liberal	Norm Letnick	10,281	52.11	$119,561
New Democratic	Matthew Reed	5,250	26.61	$17,764
Conservative	Mary-Ann Graham	2,253	11.42	$21,044
Green	Ryan Fugger	1,375	6.97	$350
Independent	Alan Clarke	571	2.89	$8,830
Total valid votes		19,730	100.00	
Total rejected ballots		89	0.45	
Turnout		19,819	47.25	
