= Population of Canadian federal ridings =

List of electoral districts

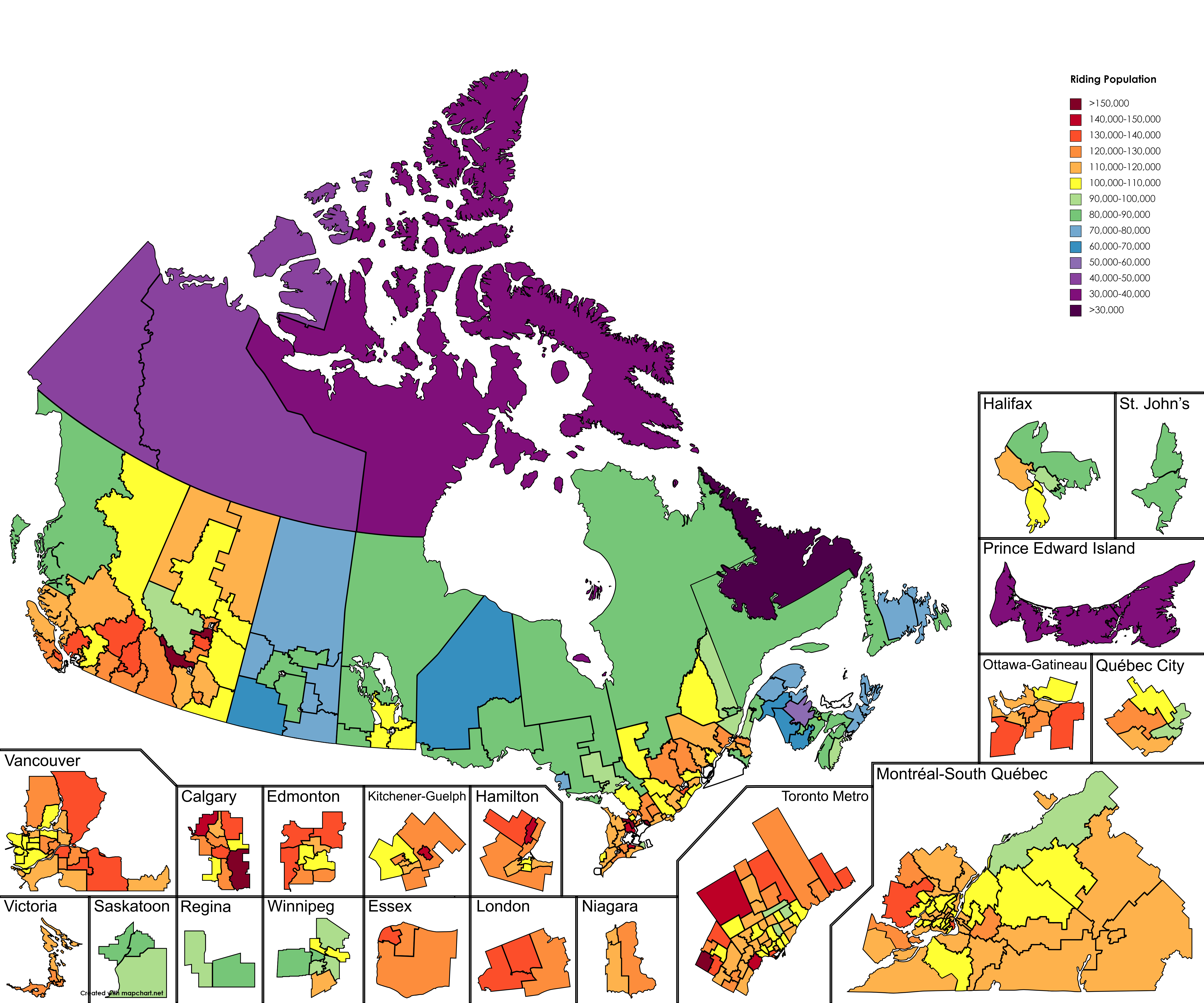
Population map of Canadian ridings (2021)

This is a list of the 338 federal electoral districts as they existed between 2015 and 2025 (also known as ridings in Canadian English) as defined by the 2013 Representation Order, which came into effect on August 2, 2015.

== Population 2011–2021 ==
District code	Province or Territory	Name	Population (2011)	Electors (2011)	Area (km^{2})	Population (2021)
10001	NL	Avalon	81,540	66,653	7,303	87,191
10002	NL	Bonavista—Burin—Trinity	76,704	61,088	18,961	71,898
10003	NL	Coast of Bays—Central—Notre Dame	78,092	63,621	43,596	74,201
10004	NL	Labrador	26,728	20,084	294,330	26,655
10005	NL	Long Range Mountains	87,592	70,272	41,606	81,716
10006	NL	St. John's East	81,936	64,137	363	87,345
10007	NL	St. John's South—Mount Pearl	81,944	66,020	503	81,544
11001	PE	Cardigan	36,005	27,958	2,658	39,866
11002	PE	Charlottetown	34,562	26,400	46	38,809
11003	PE	Egmont	34,598	26,908	1,527	35,925
11004	PE	Malpeque	35,039	27,677	1,663	39,731
12001	NS	Cape Breton—Canso	75,247	60,238	10,039	71,380
12002	NS	Central Nova	74,597	58,513	10,347	73,188
12003	NS	Cumberland—Colchester	82,321	64,065	8,269	82,014
12004	NS	Dartmouth—Cole Harbour	91,212	71,949	102	96,165
12005	NS	Halifax	92,643	68,609	244	107,010
12006	NS	Halifax West	87,275	68,266	260	111,944
12007	NS	Kings—Hants	83,306	65,347	4,440	87,744
12008	NS	Sackville—Preston—Chezzetcook	85,583	66,578	777	89,524
12009	NS	South Shore—St. Margarets	92,561	75,086	9,855	94,482
12010	NS	Sydney—Victoria	73,328	58,932	5,085	72,361
12011	NS	West Nova	83,654	65,963	9,965	83,571
13001	NB	Acadie—Bathurst	79,340	66,374	5,183	77,594
13002	NB	Beauséjour	80,416	65,927	4,214	88,797
13003	NB	Fredericton	81,759	59,284	1,678	87,436
13004	NB	Fundy Royal	79,331	62,270	7,686	83,721
13005	NB	Madawaska—Restigouche	62,540	50,442	11,962	60,184
13006	NB	Miramichi—Grand Lake	59,343	47,813	17,420	57,520
13007	NB	Moncton—Riverview—Dieppe	89,484	70,357	168	101,237
13008	NB	New Brunswick Southwest	66,197	51,004	10,770	67,781
13009	NB	Saint John—Rothesay	82,129	61,223	457	81,996
13010	NB	Tobique—Mactaquac	70,632	53,129	15,130	69,344
24001	QC	Abitibi—Baie-James—Nunavik—Eeyou	85,475	62,881	854,754	89,087
24002	QC	Abitibi—Témiscamingue	102,794	82,695	37,429	103,735
24003	QC	Ahuntsic-Cartierville	110,473	82,863	22	118,170
24004	QC	Alfred-Pellan	98,045	77,898	116	102,020
24005	QC	Argenteuil—La Petite-Nation	94,208	78,234	5,412	102,311
24006	QC	Avignon—La Mitis—Matane—Matapédia	74,547	60,721	14,723	70,253
24007	QC	Beauce	106,337	84,518	4,242	111,034
24020	QC	Beauport—Côte-de-Beaupré—Île d’Orléans—Charlevoix	92,496	75,750	11,634	95,736
24008	QC	Beauport—Limoilou	92,944	78,601	35	96,064
24009	QC	Bécancour—Nicolet—Saurel	93,779	77,971	2,870	96,439
24010	QC	Bellechasse—Les Etchemins—Lévis	112,385	91,899	3,293	120,179
24011	QC	Beloeil—Chambly	109,955	90,271	402	125,359
24012	QC	Berthier—Maskinongé	98,590	82,109	4,420	105,280
24015	QC	Bourassa	100,286	70,444	14	105,637
24016	QC	Brome—Missisquoi	98,616	84,274	3,035	113,913
24017	QC	Brossard—Saint-Lambert	100,828	83,194	58	114,286
24019	QC	Charlesbourg—Haute-Saint-Charles	103,331	83,648	118	109,690
24021	QC	Châteauguay—Lacolle	92,169	75,157	940	105,111
24022	QC	Chicoutimi—Le Fjord	81,501	66,674	2,819	80,593
24023	QC	Compton—Stanstead	101,946	81,405	4,815	111,088
24024	QC	Dorval—Lachine—LaSalle	106,886	85,471	51	119,395
24025	QC	Drummond	98,681	80,750	1,670	107,967
24026	QC	Gaspésie—Les Îles-de-la-Madeleine	78,833	65,717	17,145	75,927
24027	QC	Gatineau	106,424	83,651	125	107,286
24028	QC	Hochelaga	103,436	82,245	20	108,264
24029	QC	Honoré-Mercier	102,587	78,428	39	104,578
24030	QC	Hull—Aylmer	103,447	78,679	65	110,881
24031	QC	Joliette	100,683	85,545	9,102	112,418
24032	QC	Jonquière	87,596	72,605	42,453	91,073
24033	QC	La Pointe-de-l'Île	103,512	84,335	43	110,486
24034	QC	La Prairie	99,811	81,637	295	114,968
24035	QC	Lac-Saint-Jean	105,783	85,092	60,405	103,886
24036	QC	Lac-Saint-Louis	105,622	85,663	81	110,093
24037	QC	LaSalle—Émard—Verdun	105,317	83,876	19	107,564
24038	QC	Laurentides—Labelle	111,357	95,907	19,694	123,796
24039	QC	Laurier—Sainte-Marie	107,034	83,730	11	116,932
24040	QC	Laval—Les Îles	103,053	81,562	47	111,784
24042	QC	Lévis—Lotbinière	107,593	86,700	2,123	118,608
24041	QC	Longueuil—Charles-LeMoyne	104,895	83,360	39	112,257
24043	QC	Longueuil—Saint-Hubert	104,366	85,657	56	115,082
24044	QC	Louis-Hébert	104,038	81,285	97	111,322
24045	QC	Louis-Saint-Laurent	106,888	91,332	141	123,123
24046	QC	Manicouagan	94,766	75,124	264,226	88,525
24065	QC	Marc-Aurèle-Fortin	96,082	75,579	54	104,636
24047	QC	Mégantic—L'Érable	88,745	71,133	6,278	88,894
24048	QC	Mirabel	103,536	86,304	868	132,930
24049	QC	Montarville	95,095	75,181	158	100,515
24050	QC	Montcalm	99,518	82,538	906	118,746
24051	QC	Montmagny—L'Islet—Kamouraska—Rivière-du-Loup	97,261	78,291	7,495	96,724
24052	QC	Mount Royal	101,258	74,055	23	108,494
24053	QC	Notre-Dame-de-Grâce—Westmount	104,410	79,071	17	105,601
24054	QC	Outremont	100,916	71,300	12	103,620
24055	QC	Papineau	108,977	78,515	10	110,813
24014	QC	Pierre-Boucher—Les Patriotes—Verchères	95,326	78,251	688	103,020
24056	QC	Pierrefonds—Dollard	108,740	84,978	53	109,497
24057	QC	Pontiac	106,499	86,585	30,586	129,781
24058	QC	Portneuf—Jacques-Cartier	104,394	86,884	7,617	123,243
24059	QC	Québec	96,525	79,277	36	98,772
24060	QC	Repentigny	111,191	91,542	198	119,204
24061	QC	Richmond—Arthabaska	103,897	85,118	3,571	110,651
24018	QC	Rimouski-Neigette—Témiscouata—Les Basques	84,809	69,631	8,061	85,556
24062	QC	Rivière-des-Mille-Îles	102,816	80,957	117	105,589
24063	QC	Rivière-du-Nord	102,085	88,586	381	122,654
24064	QC	Rosemont—La Petite-Patrie	106,293	83,936	11	112,909
24066	QC	Saint-Hyacinthe—Bagot	99,629	80,577	1,948	105,086
24067	QC	Saint-Jean	108,244	88,081	734	114,617
24068	QC	Saint-Laurent	93,842	68,685	44	102,104
24069	QC	Saint-Léonard—Saint-Michel	110,649	76,351	21	115,553
24070	QC	Saint-Maurice—Champlain	110,273	91,588	38,904	111,997
24071	QC	Salaberry—Suroît	107,036	91,444	2,271	119,351
24072	QC	Shefford	107,538	87,902	1,434	115,924
24073	QC	Sherbrooke	107,988	86,809	105	119,038
24075	QC	Terrebonne	106,322	83,775	159	119,944
24013	QC	Thérèse-De Blainville	98,499	78,804	77	106,013
24076	QC	Trois-Rivières	108,774	90,709	133	114,064
24074	QC	Vaudreuil—Soulanges	111,905	89,766	408	129,612
24077	QC	Ville-Marie—Le Sud-Ouest—Île-des-Sœurs	103,070	83,351	19	134,555
24078	QC	Vimy	104,373	85,511	35	119,926
35001	ON	Ajax	109,600	83,542	71	126,666
35002	ON	Algoma—Manitoulin—Kapuskasing	79,801	62,230	100,103	80,310
35003	ON	Aurora—Oak Ridges—Richmond Hill	106,064	77,411	100	118,883
35004	ON	Barrie—Innisfil	101,584	76,389	386	120,378
35005	ON	Barrie—Springwater—Oro-Medonte	97,876	74,783	1,027	106,871
35006	ON	Bay of Quinte	109,488	83,427	2,000	116,016
35007	ON	Beaches—East York	107,084	75,169	17	109,359
35008	ON	Brampton Centre	103,122	64,148	46	104,557
35009	ON	Brampton East	99,712	65,818	89	131,677
35010	ON	Brampton North	111,951	72,312	36	125,141
35011	ON	Brampton South	107,364	70,449	49	132,752
35012	ON	Brampton West	101,762	68,796	61	162,353
35013	ON	Brantford—Brant	132,443	95,616	886	140,139
35014	ON	Bruce—Grey—Owen Sound	106,475	81,389	6,447	113,348
35015	ON	Burlington	120,569	94,679	84	125,435
35016	ON	Cambridge	111,693	82,103	373	121,301
35088	ON	Carleton	89,522	71,947	1,229	131,375
35017	ON	Chatham-Kent—Leamington	111,866	78,803	2,183	113,654
35018	ON	Davenport	102,360	70,794	13	105,946
35019	ON	Don Valley East	93,007	62,362	24	95,039
35020	ON	Don Valley North	103,073	71,081	26	113,663
35021	ON	Don Valley West	99,820	69,333	32	101,959
35022	ON	Dufferin—Caledon	116,341	91,269	2,293	142,838
35023	ON	Durham	115,395	92,317	953	150,235
35024	ON	Eglinton—Lawrence	113,150	76,739	24	115,832
35025	ON	Elgin—Middlesex—London	110,109	82,062	2,640	126,428
35026	ON	Essex	120,477	90,591	1,177	134,656
35027	ON	Etobicoke Centre	114,910	86,412	37	118,483
35028	ON	Etobicoke—Lakeshore	115,437	90,167	53	141,751
35029	ON	Etobicoke North	117,601	67,544	57	116,003
35030	ON	Flamborough—Glanbrook	97,081	77,774	941	125,692
35031	ON	Glengarry—Prescott—Russell	106,240	84,340	3,018	116,463
35032	ON	Guelph	121,688	94,632	92	143,740
35033	ON	Haldimand—Norfolk	108,051	81,773	3,061	116,706
35034	ON	Haliburton—Kawartha Lakes—Brock	110,182	90,594	8,941	122,401
35035	ON	Hamilton Centre	101,932	68,247	32	106,439
35036	ON	Hamilton East—Stoney Creek	107,786	79,750	72	112,028
35037	ON	Hamilton Mountain	103,615	76,549	35	107,629
35038	ON	Hamilton West—Ancaster—Dundas	109,535	82,929	110	117,565
35039	ON	Hastings—Lennox and Addington	92,528	71,818	9,217	100,636
35121	ON	Humber River—Black Creek	108,198	60,343	32	111,593
35040	ON	Huron—Bruce	104,842	79,533	5,896	112,929
35041	ON	Kanata—Carleton	100,846	78,431	795	116,651
35042	ON	Kenora	55,977	42,138	321,741	64,261
35043	ON	King—Vaughan	109,235	83,550	449	147,695
35044	ON	Kingston and the Islands	116,996	87,460	434	126,106
35045	ON	Kitchener Centre	102,433	76,163	44	113,452
35046	ON	Kitchener—Conestoga	93,827	67,890	949	107,134
35047	ON	Kitchener South—Hespeler	97,763	71,873	111	119,851
35048	ON	Lambton—Kent—Middlesex	105,919	80,027	5,278	111,242
35049	ON	Lanark—Frontenac—Kingston	98,409	77,808	7,322	111,424
35050	ON	Leeds—Grenville—Thousand Islands and Rideau Lakes	99,306	78,225	3,751	104,070
35051	ON	London—Fanshawe	119,334	85,124	124	127,068
35052	ON	London North Centre	118,079	87,668	63	138,255
35053	ON	London West	119,090	91,601	82	139,305
35054	ON	Markham—Stouffville	109,780	86,464	299	135,944
35055	ON	Markham—Thornhill	102,221	70,211	44	97,510
35056	ON	Markham—Unionville	104,693	81,583	89	128,308
35057	ON	Milton	88,065	70,430	472	136,993
35058	ON	Mississauga Centre	118,756	81,920	24	127,377
35059	ON	Mississauga East—Cooksville	121,792	80,906	34	116,346
35060	ON	Mississauga—Erin Mills	117,199	80,912	36	123,371
35061	ON	Mississauga—Lakeshore	118,893	85,379	92	117,095
35062	ON	Mississauga—Malton	118,046	73,591	102	116,908
35063	ON	Mississauga—Streetsville	118,757	82,618	49	116,864
35064	ON	Nepean	104,775	81,062	179	132,769
35065	ON	Newmarket—Aurora	109,457	82,454	62	127,134
35066	ON	Niagara Centre	105,860	81,364	334	119,809
35067	ON	Niagara Falls	128,357	101,505	579	146,404
35068	ON	Niagara West	86,533	68,333	1,057	96,946
35069	ON	Nickel Belt	90,962	72,134	30,490	94,947
35070	ON	Nipissing—Timiskaming	90,996	70,342	15,313	89,781
35071	ON	Northumberland—Peterborough South	107,840	88,276	3,001	118,756
35072	ON	Oakville	119,649	87,670	83	122,322
35073	ON	Oakville North—Burlington	114,378	84,100	92	148,936
35076	ON	Orléans	119,247	94,830	211	139,309
35074	ON	Oshawa	125,771	94,928	65	131,067
35075	ON	Ottawa Centre	113,619	89,360	35	126,360
35077	ON	Ottawa South	121,894	85,946	73	125,090
35078	ON	Ottawa—Vanier	110,999	82,040	41	118,806
35079	ON	Ottawa West—Nepean	111,881	81,646	71	116,409
35080	ON	Oxford	108,656	83,003	2,384	124,790
35081	ON	Parkdale—High Park	105,103	76,952	16	106,750
35082	ON	Parry Sound-Muskoka	91,263	74,977	14,402	104,494
35083	ON	Perth Wellington	104,912	75,217	3,782	113,910
35084	ON	Peterborough—Kawartha	115,269	90,352	3,473	125,478
35085	ON	Pickering—Uxbridge	109,344	84,997	687	120,742
35086	ON	Renfrew—Nipissing—Pembroke	102,537	77,520	12,583	107,420
35087	ON	Richmond Hill	108,658	79,513	42	114,180
35089	ON	St. Catharines	110,596	83,821	61	114,782
35091	ON	Sarnia—Lambton	106,293	80,029	1,568	107,077
35092	ON	Sault Ste. Marie	82,052	63,417	5,921	79,331
35093	ON	Scarborough—Agincourt	104,499	68,748	22	104,423
35094	ON	Scarborough Centre	108,826	70,145	30	113,104
35095	ON	Scarborough-Guildwood	101,914	63,296	27	103,449
35096	ON	Scarborough North	101,080	64,427	32	94,717
35097	ON	Scarborough—Rouge Park	102,646	71,291	57	102,254
35098	ON	Scarborough Southwest	106,733	71,577	29	111,994
35099	ON	Simcoe—Grey	116,307	95,511	1,950	151,784
35100	ON	Simcoe North	108,672	85,156	1,894	120,656
35101	ON	Spadina—Fort York	82,480	73,179	21	136,213
35102	ON	Stormont—Dundas—South Glengarry	100,913	78,167	2,765	104,493
35103	ON	Sudbury	92,048	71,844	977	95,537
35104	ON	Thornhill	110,427	80,288	66	115,292
35105	ON	Thunder Bay—Rainy River	82,984	62,207	39,545	82,357
35106	ON	Thunder Bay—Superior North	82,827	63,192	87,965	83,325
35107	ON	Timmins-James Bay	83,104	60,202	251,599	80,785
35108	ON	Toronto Centre	93,971	66,351	6	119,901
35109	ON	Toronto—Danforth	104,017	76,567	26	105,472
35090	ON	Toronto—St. Paul's	103,983	75,852	14	116,953
35110	ON	University—Rosedale	98,605	71,945	14	106,216
35111	ON	Vaughan—Woodbridge	105,450	73,190	84	106,810
35112	ON	Waterloo	103,192	77,312	78	127,235
35113	ON	Wellington—Halton Hills	115,880	88,674	1,584	127,873
35114	ON	Whitby	122,022	90,964	155	138,501
35115	ON	Willowdale	109,680	74,205	21	118,218
35116	ON	Windsor—Tecumseh	115,528	86,351	174	122,798
35117	ON	Windsor West	118,973	84,700	83	130,162
35118	ON	York Centre	100,277	63,682	37	108,307
35119	ON	York—Simcoe	94,616	74,911	844	124,458
35120	ON	York South—Weston	116,606	69,754	26	116,757
46001	MB	Brandon—Souris	83,814	59,459	18,290	89,812
46002	MB	Charleswood—St. James—Assiniboia—Headingley	81,864	62,583	207	84,767
46003	MB	Churchill—Keewatinook Aski	85,148	47,940	494,701	81,258
46004	MB	Dauphin—Swan River—Neepawa	87,374	61,579	56,820	89,503
46005	MB	Elmwood—Transcona	85,906	64,395	50	101,691
46006	MB	Kildonan—St. Paul	81,794	61,252	172	91,480
46007	MB	Portage—Lisgar	91,019	61,350	12,665	100,417
46008	MB	Provencher	88,640	63,356	18,773	109,445
46009	MB	Saint Boniface—Saint Vital	84,353	64,202	65	95,514
46010	MB	Selkirk—Interlake—Eastman	91,463	69,587	25,824	101,373
46011	MB	Winnipeg Centre	82,026	54,719	29	87,499
46012	MB	Winnipeg North	88,616	56,380	38	101,221
46013	MB	Winnipeg South	85,540	62,156	105	113,370
46014	MB	Winnipeg South Centre	90,711	67,988	46	94,803
47001	SK	Battlefords—Lloydminster	70,034	48,638	30,125	70,918
47004	SK	Carlton Trail—Eagle Creek	72,607	53,836	29,040	83,395
47002	SK	Cypress Hills—Grasslands	67,834	49,713	77,822	68,314
47003	SK	Desnethé—Missinippi—Churchill River	69,471	43,128	342,903	71,488
47005	SK	Moose Jaw—Lake Centre—Lanigan	76,106	56,621	32,882	80,547
47006	SK	Prince Albert	79,344	55,873	18,927	80,845
47007	SK	Regina—Lewvan	79,587	61,879	58	98,492
47008	SK	Regina—Qu'Appelle	72,891	52,220	13,430	78,140
47009	SK	Regina—Wascana	77,208	55,497	63	89,087
47010	SK	Saskatoon—Grasswood	72,010	57,268	342	93,277
47011	SK	Saskatoon—University	76,257	55,219	71	88,348
47012	SK	Saskatoon West	76,704	54,086	93	87,855
47013	SK	Souris—Moose Mountain	72,058	51,580	43,184	70,579
47014	SK	Yorkton—Melville	71,270	53,446	43,272	71,220
48001	AB	Banff—Airdrie	105,442	87,666	12,282	155,580
48002	AB	Battle River—Crowfoot	107,140	79,873	53,072	107,979
48003	AB	Bow River	103,871	73,598	24,427	119,458
48004	AB	Calgary Centre	108,931	83,497	49	130,010
48005	AB	Calgary Confederation	111,785	85,997	54	124,064
48006	AB	Calgary Forest Lawn	108,251	73,857	53	107,939
48007	AB	Calgary Heritage	108,320	79,349	70	109,141
48008	AB	Calgary Midnapore	111,227	85,280	87	129,110
48009	AB	Calgary Nose Hill	109,286	80,629	57	115,287
48010	AB	Calgary Rocky Ridge	108,901	84,093	90	145,326
48011	AB	Calgary Shepard	110,296	93,794	186	163,447
48012	AB	Calgary Signal Hill	109,647	83,227	66	122,818
48013	AB	Calgary Skyview	110,189	71,741	123	159,642
48014	AB	Edmonton Centre	106,121	76,739	46	109,125
48015	AB	Edmonton Griesbach	107,809	78,785	46	111,699
48016	AB	Edmonton Manning	106,262	78,003	158	132,224
48017	AB	Edmonton Mill Woods	106,103	72,151	50	125,992
48018	AB	Edmonton Riverbend	106,302	79,932	60	124,144
48019	AB	Edmonton Strathcona	103,183	74,710	80	102,188
48020	AB	Edmonton West	104,422	78,293	105	134,194
48021	AB	Edmonton—Wetaskiwin	110,644	95,162	4,947	209,431
48022	AB	Foothills	105,515	80,188	20,877	115,118
48023	AB	Fort McMurray—Cold Lake	101,538	75,312	147,412	110,163
48024	AB	Grande Prairie-Mackenzie	106,738	79,309	109,194	119,586
48025	AB	Lakeland	104,616	77,809	31,877	105,993
48026	AB	Lethbridge	105,999	80,020	3,028	123,847
48027	AB	Medicine Hat—Cardston—Warner	102,847	75,944	29,982	108,391
48028	AB	Peace River—Westlock	108,095	73,627	105,924	107,223
48030	AB	Red Deer—Lacombe	113,693	83,963	6,316	131,575
48029	AB	Red Deer—Mountain View	110,793	84,758	7,659	120,739
48031	AB	St. Albert—Edmonton	105,162	82,120	104	130,822
48032	AB	Sherwood Park—Fort Saskatchewan	111,541	87,943	1,271	126,313
48033	AB	Sturgeon River—Parkland	105,733	82,718	4,000	124,849
48034	AB	Yellowhead	98,855	72,816	76,127	99,218
59001	BC	Abbotsford	96,819	67,509	176	110,331
59002	BC	Burnaby North—Seymour	100,632	72,393	115	108,794
59003	BC	Burnaby South	105,037	73,925	47	120,305
59004	BC	Cariboo—Prince George	108,252	77,042	83,193	111,226
59005	BC	Central Okanagan—Similkameen—Nicola	104,398	84,348	16,208	122,340
59006	BC	Chilliwack—Hope	92,734	70,240	3,355	112,037
59007	BC	Cloverdale—Langley City	100,318	75,076	60	130,665
59008	BC	Coquitlam-Port Coquitlam	110,277	82,358	650	132,004
59009	BC	Courtenay—Alberni	110,391	88,673	8,571	125,116
59010	BC	Cowichan—Malahat—Langford	99,160	78,148	4,749	124,247
59011	BC	Delta	100,588	72,865	207	110,721
59026	BC	Esquimalt—Saanich—Sooke	113,004	87,281	404	128,644
59012	BC	Fleetwood—Port Kells	109,742	72,487	74	124,987
59013	BC	Kamloops—Thompson—Cariboo	118,618	92,130	38,320	135,492
59014	BC	Kelowna—Lake Country	110,051	86,934	1,670	136,290
59015	BC	Kootenay—Columbia	107,589	83,190	64,336	120,759
59016	BC	Langley—Aldergrove	103,084	80,360	382	133,168
59017	BC	Mission—Matsqui—Fraser Canyon	90,871	61,105	21,769	101,216
59018	BC	Nanaimo—Ladysmith	114,998	91,240	1,753	134,509
59019	BC	New Westminster—Burnaby	108,652	77,639	29	125,253
59037	BC	North Island—Powell River	103,458	57,911	79,517	111,825
59020	BC	North Okanagan—Shuswap	121,474	94,179	16,734	136,520
59021	BC	North Vancouver	109,639	82,085	342	123,025
59022	BC	Pitt Meadows—Maple Ridge	94,111	70,289	2,141	110,416
59023	BC	Port Moody—Coquitlam	108,326	77,368	101	114,853
59024	BC	Prince George—Peace River—Northern Rockies	107,382	75,063	243,276	108,998
59025	BC	Richmond Centre	93,863	67,734	49	107,707
59027	BC	Saanich—Gulf Islands	104,285	83,970	518	113,541
59028	BC	Skeena—Bulkley Valley	90,586	62,234	327,275	89,689
59029	BC	South Okanagan—West Kootenay	112,096	88,519	18,139	123,487
59030	BC	South Surrey—White Rock	94,678	74,649	154	119,672
59031	BC	Steveston—Richmond East	96,610	70,676	102	102,230
59032	BC	Surrey Centre	111,486	68,719	44	131,670
59033	BC	Surrey—Newton	105,183	62,855	30	122,264
59034	BC	Vancouver Centre	102,480	84,273	14	126,995
59035	BC	Vancouver East	110,097	85,900	21	118,675
59036	BC	Vancouver Granville	99,886	76,973	23	109,799
59038	BC	Vancouver Kingsway	102,003	69,812	15	108,054
59039	BC	Vancouver Quadra	102,416	72,409	42	109,328
59040	BC	Vancouver South	100,966	68,733	21	109,339
59041	BC	Victoria	110,942	90,217	43	123,482
59042	BC	West Vancouver—Sunshine Coast—Sea to Sky Country	112,875	86,370	13,237	131,206
60001	YT	Yukon	33,897	25,264	482,443	40,232
61001	NT	Northwest Territories	41,462	28,795	1,346,106	41,070
62001	NU	Nunavut	31,906	18,124	2,093,190	36,858

== 2021 electoral population and ridings by province/territory ==
On October 15, 2021, the Chief Electoral Officer calculated the House of Commons seats to be allocated to each province using the representation formula found in the Constitution and the population estimates provided by Statistics Canada. This seat allocation will only take effect when a new representation order comes into force. Consult the federal redistribution timeline to find out more.

== Allocation of seats in the House of Commons after the 2021 census ==
Which took effect as of the April 2025 Federal Election

Province/ Territory	Population estimate	÷ Electoral quotient	= Initial seat allocation	+ Senatorial clause	+ Grandfather clause	+ Representation rule	= Total seats	Actual 2021 Census Population	Average Population per District
British Columbia	5,214,805	121,891	43	-	-	-	43	5,000,879	116,299
Alberta	4,442,879	121,891	37	-	-	-	37	4,262,635	115,206
Saskatchewan	1,179,844	121,891	10	-	4	-	14	1,132,505	80,893
Manitoba	1,383,765	121,891	12	-	2	-	14	1,342,153	95,868
Ontario	14,826,276	121,891	122	-	-	-	122	14,223,942	116,589
Quebec	8,604,495	121,891	71	-	7	-	78	8,501,833	108,997
New Brunswick	789,225	121,891	7	3	-	-	10	775,610	77,561
Nova Scotia	992,055	121,891	9	1	1	-	11	969,383	88,125
Prince Edward Island	164,318	121,891	2	2	-	-	4	154,331	38,582
Newfoundland and Labrador	520,553	121,891	5	1	1	-	7	510,550	72,935
Yukon	42,986	n/a					1	40,232	40,232
Northwest Territories	45,504	n/a					1	41,070	41,070
Nunavut	39,403	n/a					1	36,858	36,858
Total	38,246,108						343	36,991,981	107,848

== 2016 demographics of ridings ==
A 2017 study found that 41 of the 338 federal ridings have populations where visible minorities/non-whites form the majority of the riding.
Ontario and British Columbia have the largest number of ridings where visible minorities form the majority of the population. Quebec has the most ridings with less than 5% visible minorities.
