= Tracy Gray =

Canadian politician

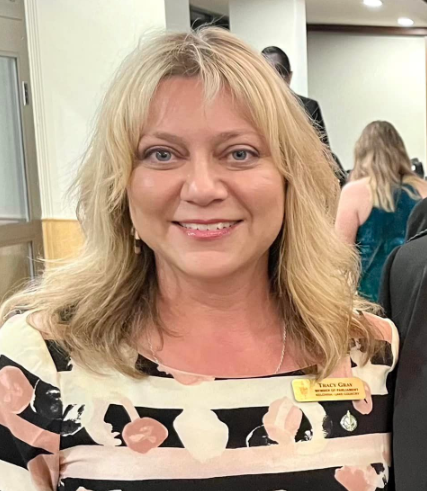

Member of Parliament for Kelowna—Lake Country
- In office October 21, 2019 – April 28, 2025
- Preceded by: Stephen Fuhr
- Succeeded by: Stephen Fuhr

Kelowna city councillor
- In office November 15, 2014 – October 20, 2018

Personal details
- Born: 1969 or 1970 (age 56–57) Edmonton, Alberta, Canada
- Party: Conservative Party of Canada
- Other political affiliations: Conservative Party of British Columbia
- Spouse: Larry Gray
- Children: 1
- Education: University of Calgary
- Profession: Small Business Owner; Business Executive

Tracy Gray is a Canadian politician and businesswoman who served as a member of Parliament (MP) representing the riding of Kelowna—Lake Country in the House of Commons from 2019 to 2025. A member of the Conservative Party, she was first elected to the 2019 federal election. She also served as a city councillor for Kelowna City from 2014 to 2018.

== Early career ==
Prior to entering public service, Gray had worked extensively in the British Columbia liquor industry. She served in senior managerial capacities at several breweries and wineries in the Okanagan Valley, including Mission Hill Winery and Granville Island Brewing. She ran the Retail and Hospitality department at Mission Hill when it was awarded the International Wine and Spirit Competition Avery Trophy for Best Chardonnay in the World.

In 2003, Gray launched a chain of VQA wine stores in the British Columbia Interior. Throughout its operation, the chain included the highest ranked wine store in British Columbia in terms of sales, and carried over 800 varieties of local British Columbia wine. Gray has guest lectured at the University of British Columbia Okanagan and Okanagan College about entrepreneurship and has been an advocate and mentor for women in business. Gray hosted a weekly wine lifestyle segment on Global Okanagan and has also served as a judge at several international wine competitions.

Gray was a director on the Okanagan Film Commission, an organization that promotes regional economic development in film and animation. She was also a board member for Prospera Credit Union. Gray was on the board when Prospera merged with Westminster Savings, the largest credit union merger in Canadian history, making the new organization the 6th largest credit union in Canada. She also served as a director on the Kelowna Chamber of Commerce.

Gray was appointed by British Columbia's cabinet to serve on the Passenger Transportation Board.

== Political career ==
=== Kelowna City Councillor (2014–2018) ===
Gray was elected as a Kelowna City Councillor following the 2014 municipal election. While on City Council, Gray was also elected as Chair of the Okanagan Basin Water Board, and spearheaded the region's flood mitigation strategy and invasive Quagga mussel prevention campaign. In April 2017, the provincial government responded to the concerns raised by Gray and the Water Board about invasive mussels by hiring more conservation officers and providing funding for two more boat inspection stations in the area. She was also appointed as a Trustee on the Okanagan Regional Library board.

She also served at the regional government level as a director on the Central Okanagan Regional District board.

=== Federal politics (2018–2025) ===
On September 6, 2018, Gray announced she would seek the federal Conservative nomination for the electoral district of Kelowna—Lake Country, stating she felt compelled to run following the Liberal government's proposed small business tax changes. She won the contested nomination on April 6, 2019. Gray was elected as the Member of Parliament for the riding on October 21, defeating Liberal incumbent Stephen Fuhr. She is the first woman to be elected as a Member of Parliament for the riding.

Gray was named to the Official Opposition Shadow Cabinet in November 2019 as Shadow Minister for Interprovincial Trade. Following the election of Erin O'Toole as Conservative party leader, in September 2020 Gray became Shadow Minister for Export Promotion and International Trade. In her capacity as Shadow Minister for International Trade, Gray moved and passed a motion in the House of Commons to establish the Special Committee on the Economic Relationship between Canada and the United States, composed of members from recognized parties to study trade issues between the two countries.

She was re-elected for a second term in September 2021. Following the election, Gray was re-appointed to Shadow Cabinet in a new role as Shadow Minister for Small Business Recovery and Growth.

After the election of Pierre Poilievre as leader of the Conservative Party, Gray was given an updated role as the Shadow Minister for Employment, Future Workforce Development and Persons with Disabilities. She was also appointed vice-chair of the Committee on Human Resources, Skills and the Status of Persons with Disabilities.

Gray has advocated in Parliament for the federal government to do their part to complete the Okanagan Rail Trail, a multi-use path crossing the Okanagan region converting the former Okanagan Valley Railway. Presently, a 2 kilometer middle portion of the trail is incomplete while awaiting a federal government land transfer to the Okanagan Indian Band via an addition-to-reserve. Gray has written to the federal government and has asked numerous questions seeking updates on the completion of this addition-to-reserve process.

Gray voted against a bill that would prohibit compelling people to undergo conversion therapy intended to alter their sexual orientations. Gray supported an updated bill to ban conversion therapy in Canada which passed unanimously in Parliament, Bill C-4, stating that this revised legislation addressed her concerns from the previous iteration.

Abortion Rights Coalition of Canada has identified Gray as anti-abortion. Gray voted at second reading to send Bill C-233 - An Act to amend the Criminal Code (sex-selective abortion) to the committee stage for further study, which would make it an indictable offence for a medical practitioner to knowingly perform an abortion solely on the grounds of the child's genetic sex.

Gray successfully advocated for the full re-opening of the Kelowna International Airport to international flights in November 2021. Transborder flights at the airport were initially halted at the onset of the COVID-19 pandemic, with the resumption of these flights from Kelowna delayed by Transport Canada despite airports with lesser passenger volumes being returned their international designation earlier. She has also advocated for the expansion of passport services offered in the Okanagan, requesting the federal government allow Kelowna's passport office to provide urgent, same-day passport pick-up. Presently, individuals in BC's Interior must commute to either Surrey or Calgary for urgent passport requests.

In the 44th Parliament, Gray tabled Private Member's Bill C-283, titled End the Revolving Door Act. This bill sought to amend the Corrections and Conditional Release Act to allow a penitentiary to be used as an addiction treatment facility and to insert into the Criminal Code an ability for a person sentenced to imprisonment to request they serve their sentence there, with the objective of reducing recidivism and addressing mental health and addictions issues for federal inmates. Despite being supported by the Conservative Party and Bloc Québécois, the bill was defeated at second reading. As a person who was adopted at birth, she has also tabled a Private Member's Motion M-46 to recognize November as 'National Adoption Awareness Month'. Gray also jointly seconded a number of Private Member's Bills such as C-321, An Act to amend the Criminal Code (assaults against persons who provide health services and first responders), C-323, An Act to amend the Excise Tax Act (mental health services), and C-389, Improving Accessibility to Automated External Defibrillators Act.

She was unseated in the 2025 Canadian federal election, by Stephen Fuhr in the new seat of Kelowna.

=== Provincial politics (2026) ===
On September 23, 2026, Gray announced her intention to seek the nomination in Kelowna-Lake Country-Coldstream for the Conservative Party of British Columbia for the snap 2026 British Columbia general election. However, later that day, the party announced that Pavneet Singh would be the candidate.

== Committee assignments ==
=== Previous ===
- Committee on Human Resources, Skills and the Status of Persons with Disabilities (Vice Chair)
  - Subcommittee on Agenda and Procedure of the Standing Committee on Human Resources
- Committee on International Trade (Vice Chair) (September 2020 to September 2021)
  - Subcommittee on Agenda and Procedure of the Standing Committee on International Trade
- Committee on Industry, Science and Technology (February 2020 to August 2020, October 2021 to October 2022)
- Special Committee on the COVID-19 Pandemic (April 2020 to June 2020)

== Personal life ==
Gray is married with one adult son. She was born in Edmonton and grew up in Lethbridge, moving to Kelowna in 1989. She is a graduate of the Haskayne School of Business at the University of Calgary.

In her free time, Gray enjoys skiing and used to sing in a volunteer community rock band composed of elected officials in the Kelowna-area. Gray also volunteers with organizations in her communities of Kelowna and Lake Country. She has volunteered in Rutland's annual fall and spring cleanups and served food with Kelowna's Gospel Missions.

== Awards and recognition ==
In 2006, Gray was named RBC Canadian Woman Entrepreneur of the Year.

In 2008, she was named by the Women's Enterprise Centre as one of 100 'New Pioneers' in British Columbia involved in entrepreneurship.

In 2015, she was named as a 'Woman to Watch' by the Kelowna Chamber of Commerce and Kelowna Capital News for her work in the local wine industry and on city council.

== Electoral record ==
=== Federal ===
2025 Canadian federal election: Kelowna
Party	Candidate	Votes	%	±%	Expenditures
Liberal	Stephen Fuhr	28,702	48.78	+22.54	$118,108.03
Conservative	Tracy Gray	27,620	46.94	+4.63	$116,654.48
New Democratic	Trevor McAleese	1,941	3.30	–17.85	$12,285.91
Green	Catriona Wright	578	0.98	–2.03	none listed
Total valid votes/expense limit		58,841	99.34	–	$129,900.20
Total rejected ballots		392	0.66	+0.36	
Turnout		59,233	70.20	+8.07	
Eligible voters		84,374			
Liberal gain from Conservative		Swing		+8.96	
Source: Elections Canada

2021 Canadian federal election: Kelowna—Lake Country
Party	Candidate	Votes	%	±%	Expenditures
Conservative	Tracy Gray	30,409	45.29	–0.28	$120,346.39
Liberal	Tim Krupa	17,767	26.46	–6.27	$120,498.91
New Democratic	Cade Desjarlais	12,204	18.18	+6.05	$5,052.71
People's	Brian Rogers	4,688	6.98	+5.21	none listed
Green	Imre Szeman	2,074	3.09	–4.39	$14,210.33
Total valid votes/expense limit		67,142	99.49	–	$131,152.01
Total rejected ballots		346	0.51	+0.07	
Turnout		67,488	63.32	–5.08	
Eligible voters		106,585			
Conservative hold		Swing		+3.01	
Source: Elections Canada

2019 Canadian federal election: Kelowna—Lake Country
Party	Candidate	Votes	%	±%	Expenditures
Conservative	Tracy Gray	31,497	45.57	+5.82	$109,422.53
Liberal	Stephen Fuhr	22,627	32.74	–13.42	$103,263.61
New Democratic	Justin Kulik	8,381	12.13	–1.96	$8,811.35
Green	Travis Ashley	5,171	7.48	–	$6,745.70
People's	John Barr	1,225	1.77	–	$7,213.32
Independent	Daniel Joseph	152	0.22	–	none listed
Independent	Nicola-Silverado Socrates	67	0.10	–	none listed
Total valid votes/expense limit		69,120	99.56	–	$123,247.35
Total rejected ballots		305	0.44	+0.08	
Turnout		69,425	68.39	–2.26	
Eligible voters		101,507			
Conservative gain from Liberal		Swing		+9.62	
Source: Elections Canada

=== Municipal ===
Kelowna Municipal Election (2014) Top 8 candidates elected
Party	Council candidate	Vote	%
Independent	Luke Stack (X)	16,524	9.20
Independent	Gail Given (X)	15,559	8.66
Independent	Maxime DeHart (X)	15,522	8.64
Independent	Mohini Singh (X)	15,415	8.58
Independent	Brad Sieben	12,587	7.01
Independent	Tracy Gray	11,515	6.41
Independent	Ryan Donn	9,565	5.32
Independent	Charles Hodge	9,444	5.26
Independent	Beryl Itani	8,119	4.52
Independent	Laura Thurnheer	7,71	4.33
Independent	Alan Monk	6,185	3.44
Independent	David Mossman	5,262	2.93
TaxPayersFirst	Graeme James	4,835	2.69
TaxPayersFirst	Michael Gorman	4,391	2.44
Propser Kelowna	Mike McLoughlin	4,327	2.41
Propser Kelowna	Sean Upshaw	3,909	2.18
TaxPayersFirst	Carol Gran	3,803	2.12
Independent	Bobby Kennedy	3,107	1.73
Independent	Mo Rajabally	3,024	1.68
TaxPayersFirst	Dale Olson	2,491	1.39
Independent	Dayleen Van Ryswyk	2,294	1.28
TaxPayersFirst	Billie Aaltonen	2,191	1.22
Independent	Leslie Lendall	2,071	1.15
Independent	Rawle James	1,739	0.97
Independent	Connor P.J. O'Reilly	1,493	0.83
Independent	Ken Chung	1,474	0.82
Independent	Gwen Miles	1,272	0.71
Independent	Ken Finney	1,263	0.70
Independent	Cal Condy	989	0.55
Independent	Krista Jessacher	773	0.43
Independent	Red Somer	751	0.42
