= Stephen Fuhr =

Canadian politician (born 1969)

The Honourable Stephen Fuhr PC CD MP
- Fuhr in 2026

Secretary of State for Defence Procurement
- Incumbent
- Assumed office May 13, 2025
- Prime Minister: Mark Carney
- Preceded by: Position established

Member of Parliament for Kelowna
- Incumbent
- Assumed office April 28, 2025
- Preceded by: Tracy Gray

Member of Parliament for Kelowna—Lake Country
- In office October 19, 2015 – September 11, 2019
- Preceded by: Ron Cannan
- Succeeded by: Tracy Gray

Chairman of the Standing Committee on National Defence
- In office February 18, 2016 – September 11, 2019
- Preceded by: Peter Kent
- Succeeded by: Karen McCrimmon

Personal details
- Born: Stephen Bradley Fuhr; May 27, 1969 (age 57) Edmonton, Alberta, Canada
- Party: Liberal (2010–present); Conservative (2003–2010); Canadian Alliance (2000–2003); Reform (c. 2000)
- Education: Trinity Western University
- Profession: Politician; entrepreneur; fighter pilot

Military service
- Allegiance: Canada
- Branch/service: Air Command
- Years of service: 1989–2009
- Rank: Major

Stephen Bradley Fuhr MP (born May 27, 1969) is a Canadian politician and retired military officer who has served as the secretary of state for defence procurement since 2025. A member of the Liberal Party, Fuhr has been the member of Parliament (MP) for Kelowna since 2025, previously representing its predecessor Kelowna—Lake Country from 2015 to 2019. Fuhr served as a pilot with the Canadian Armed Forces (CAF) for 20 years, retiring in 2009 with the rank of Major.

== Early life and education ==
Fuhr was born in Edmonton, Alberta, and was raised in Kamloops, British Columbia. He pursued post-secondary studies in aviation technology at Trinity Western University, earning a diploma that enabled him to begin an aviation career.

== Military career ==
In 1989, Fuhr joined the Royal Canadian Air Force. Over a 20-year career, he served in various roles, including A2 flight instructor, standards officer, CF-18 Hornet fighter pilot, and fleet manager. He was a qualified NORAD and NATO operations evaluation officer. In his last year of service, Fuhr led the team that restructured the course delivery method of the RCAF Instrument Check Pilot School (ICPS).

== Aviation career ==
Following his military retirement, Fuhr transitioned to the civilian aviation industry. He served as Vice President and Director of Business Development, and later the president and CEO of SkyTrac Systems, an aerospace and satellite communications company, from 2009 to 2012. From 2013 to 2015, Fuhr was qualified as an aircraft captain on several different transport category aircraft for a private part 91 operator. Fuhr is currently a Transport Canada pilot examiner, with delegated authority to issue and renew pilot instrument ratings.

== Political career ==
=== Shift from Conservative to Liberal ===
Fuhr was previously a supporter of the Conservative Party but became disillusioned with its policy direction, particularly concerning defence and procurement issues. In his own words, he grew concerned with how the government under Prime Minister Stephen Harper was "mismanaging" defence files. In 2010, Fuhr joined the Liberal Party of Canada, believing it better aligned with his values.

=== Member of Parliament (2015–2019) ===
In the 2015 federal election, Fuhr ran as the Liberal candidate for Kelowna—Lake Country. He defeated incumbent Conservative MP Ron Cannan, marking a significant upset in a historically Conservative riding. Fuhr became the first Liberal elected in Kelowna—Lake Country since 1972. During his term, Fuhr was appointed Chair of the House of Commons Standing Committee on National Defence. In this role, he oversaw committee studies on Canada's defence posture, procurement processes, and military support for international missions. Fuhr also spoke publicly on issues related to veterans' affairs, defence strategy, and national security, emphasizing a pragmatic approach to foreign policy. Fuhr tabled a private members motion in the House of Commons asking the Standing Committee on Transport to examine how the Government of Canada could better support flight training and flight schools to combat Canada’s pilot shortage. The motion passed unanimously 288–0. In the 2019 federal election, Fuhr was defeated by Tracy Gray, the Conservative Party candidate, returning the riding to Conservative control.

=== Return to politics (2025–present) ===
On March 21, 2025, Fuhr was acclaimed as the Liberal candidate for the newly restructured Kelowna riding for the forthcoming federal election. Speaking about his decision to return to politics, Fuhr cited the turmoil that has ensued in the Canada–U.S. relationship following the 2024 United States presidential election. He described the national situation as an "all hands on deck moment for the country". On April 29, 2025, Fuhr was elected in the Kelowna riding, returning to the House of Commons as a member of the 45th Canadian Parliament.

On May 13, 2025, Fuhr was appointed Secretary of State for Defence Procurement, a role in which he is tasked with overseeing military acquisitions and ensuring the Canadian Armed Forces are adequately equipped to meet national and international commitments.

While in that role Fuhr has been responsible for the procurement of:

- 14 additional F35s from Lockheed Martin
- $307 million worth of Canadian Modular Assault Rifles from Colt Canada
- HIMARS missiles and 26 launchers from Lockheed Martin
- 12 submarines from ThyssenKrupp

== Community involvement ==
Outside of his professional and political career, Fuhr has been involved in veterans and community organizations. His affiliations have included: the Rotary Club of Kelowna, the Royal Canadian Legion, Kelowna Branch 26, and the Kelowna Army Navy & Air Force Veterans Unit 376.

== Personal life ==
Fuhr is a father of one.

In August 2023, Fuhr's home in West Kelowna was destroyed in the McDougall Creek fire, which ravaged hundreds of properties in the area. Fuhr publicly vowed to rebuild and expressed gratitude for community support in the aftermath of the disaster.

== Electoral record ==
2025 Canadian federal election: Kelowna
Party	Candidate	Votes	%	±%	Expenditures
Liberal	Stephen Fuhr	28,702	48.78	+22.54	$118,108.03
Conservative	Tracy Gray	27,620	46.94	+4.63	$116,654.48
New Democratic	Trevor McAleese	1,941	3.30	–17.85	$12,285.91
Green	Catriona Wright	578	0.98	–2.03	none listed
Total valid votes/expense limit		58,841	99.34	–	$129,900.20
Total rejected ballots		392	0.66	+0.36	
Turnout		59,233	70.20	+8.07	
Eligible voters		84,374			
Liberal gain from Conservative		Swing		+8.96	
Source: Elections Canada

2019 Canadian federal election: Kelowna—Lake Country
Party	Candidate	Votes	%	±%	Expenditures
Conservative	Tracy Gray	31,497	45.57	+5.82	$109,422.53
Liberal	Stephen Fuhr	22,627	32.74	–13.42	$103,263.61
New Democratic	Justin Kulik	8,381	12.13	–1.96	$8,811.35
Green	Travis Ashley	5,171	7.48	–	$6,745.70
People's	John Barr	1,225	1.77	–	$7,213.32
Independent	Daniel Joseph	152	0.22	–	none listed
Independent	Nicola-Silverado Socrates	67	0.10	–	none listed
Total valid votes/expense limit		69,120	99.56	–	$123,247.35
Total rejected ballots		305	0.44	+0.08	
Turnout		69,425	68.39	–2.26	
Eligible voters		101,507			
Conservative gain from Liberal		Swing		+9.62	
Source: Elections Canada

2015 Canadian federal election: Kelowna—Lake Country
Party	Candidate	Votes	%	±%	Expenditures
Liberal	Stephen Fuhr	29,614	46.16	+34.69	$127,725.08
Conservative	Ron Cannan	25,502	39.75	–18.63	$70,942.48
New Democratic	Norah Mary Bowman	9,039	14.09	–7.28	$33,945.86
Total valid votes/expense limit		64,155	99.64	–	$228,718.18
Total rejected ballots		230	0.36		
Turnout		64,385	70.65		
Eligible voters		91,131			
Liberal gain from Conservative		Swing		+26.66	
Source: Elections Canada

Order of precedence
Preceded by Buckley Belanger as Secretary of State	Order of Precedence of Canada as Secretary of State	Succeeded by Anna Gainey as Secretary of State
