= John Weisbeck =

Canadian politician

MLA for Kelowna-Lake Country
- In office 1996–2005
- Preceded by: Judi Tyabji
- Succeeded by: Al Horning

Personal details
- Born: 1943 (age 82–83)
- Party: BC Liberal
- Education: University of British Columbia; University of Alberta
- Occupation: dentist

John Weisbeck is a former Canadian politician, who served as a BC Liberal Member of the Legislative Assembly of British Columbia from 1996 to 2005, representing the riding of Kelowna-Lake Country.

Weisbeck received his Bachelor of Science degree from the University of British Columbia in 1963 then attained his Doctor of Dental Surgery Degree from the University of Alberta before working as a dentist in Kelowna for 25 years.

In 1988, he was elected as a city councillor for Kelowna City Council where he ended up serving for two terms. He then went on to serve for two terms provincially as the MLA for Okanagan East (unseating Judi Tyabji) and then Kelowna, Lake Country. During his first term, he served as Official Opposition Critic for Advanced Education, Training and Technology. In his final term he served as Deputy Speaker.

== Election results ==
2001 British Columbia general election: Kelowna-Lake Country
Party	Candidate	Votes	%	Expenditures
Liberal	John Weisbeck	14,093	63.19	$38,373
New Democratic	Janet Elizabeth Scotland	3,102	13.91	$9,340
Green	Devra Lynn Rice	2,606	11.68	$1,098
Unity	Kevin Wendland	1,496	6.71	$1,493
Marijuana	Paul Halonen	734	3.29	$444
Action	David Thomson	272	1.22	$790
Total valid votes		22,303	100.00	
Total rejected ballots		104	0.47	
Turnout		22,407	66.91	

1996 British Columbia general election: Okanagan East
Party	Candidate	Votes	%
Liberal	John Weisbeck	9,382	38.37%
Progressive Democrat	Judi Tyabji	6,432	26.30%
New Democratic	Janet Elizabeth Gooch	5,176	21.17%
Reform	Paul Halonen	3,116	12.74%
Green	Dave Cursons	347	1.47%
Total valid votes		24,453	
Total rejected ballots		108	
