= Central Okanagan—Similkameen—Nicola =

Federal electoral district in British Columbia, Canada

British Columbia electoral district
- Central_Okanagan—Similkameen—Nicola in relation to other British Columbia federal electoral districts

Federal electoral district
- Legislature: House of Commons
- District created: 2013
- District abolished: 2023
- First contested: 2015
- Last contested: 2021
- District webpage: profile, map

Demographics
- Population (2011): 104,398
- Electors (2019): 94,331
- Area (km²): 16,208
- Census division(s): Central Okanagan, Okanagan-Similkameen, Thompson-Nicola
- Census subdivision(s): Kelowna, Logan Lake, Merritt, Okanagan-Similkameen F, Okanagan-Similkameen G, Peachland, Princeton, Summerland, Tsinstikeptum 9, West Kelowna

Central Okanagan—Similkameen—Nicola was a former federal electoral district in British Columbia. It encompassed a portion of British Columbia formerly included in the electoral districts of Okanagan—Coquihalla (66%), Kelowna—Lake Country (25%) and British Columbia Southern Interior (10%).

Central Okanagan—Similkameen—Nicola was created by the 2012 federal electoral boundaries redistribution and was legally defined in the 2013 representation order. It came into effect upon the call of the 42nd Canadian federal election, in October 2015. As a result of the 2022 federal electoral boundaries redistribution, the district was dissolved and the 44th Canadian federal election remains the last time it was contested.

== Demographics ==
Panethnic groups in Central Okanagan—Similkameen—Nicola (2011−2021)
Panethnic group	2021		2016		2011	
Panethnic group	Pop.	%	Pop.	%	Pop.	%
European (Note: Statistic includes all persons that did not make up part of a visible minority or an indigenous identity.)	99,175	83.13%	90,780	85.04%	89,275	87.79%
Indigenous	10,905	9.14%	9,765	9.15%	7,680	7.55%
South Asian	2,400	2.01%	1,665	1.56%	1,525	1.5%
East Asian (Note: Statistic includes total responses of "Chinese", "Korean", and "Japanese" under visible minority section on census.)	2,325	1.95%	1,840	1.72%	1,390	1.37%
Southeast Asian (Note: Statistic includes total responses of "Filipino" and "Southeast Asian" under visible minority section on census.)	1,645	1.38%	1,070	1%	675	0.66%
African	1,030	0.86%	570	0.53%	470	0.46%
Latin American	815	0.68%	475	0.44%	270	0.27%
Middle Eastern (Note: Statistic includes total responses of "West Asian" and "Arab" under visible minority section on census.)	530	0.44%	260	0.24%	180	0.18%
Other (Note: Statistic includes total responses of "Visible minority, n.i.e." and "Multiple visible minorities" under visible minority section on census.)	465	0.39%	315	0.3%	220	0.22%
Total responses	119,295	97.51%	106,750	96.79%	101,690	97.41%
Total population	122,340	100%	110,293	100%	104,398	100%
Notes: Totals greater than 100% due to multiple origin responses. Demographics based on 2012 Canadian federal electoral redistribution riding boundaries.

== Members of Parliament ==
This riding has elected the following members of the House of Commons of Canada:

Parliament	Years	Member	Party
Central Okanagan—Similkameen—Nicola; Riding created from British Columbia Southern Interior, Kelowna—Lake Country and Okanagan—Coquihalla
42nd	2015–2019	Dan Albas	Conservative
43rd	2019–2021	Dan Albas	Conservative
44th	2021–2025	Dan Albas	Conservative
Riding dissolved into Kamloops—Thompson—Nicola, Okanagan Lake West—South Kelowna, Similkameen—South Okanagan—West Kootenay, and Vernon—Lake Country—Monashee

== Election results ==
View source data.
Graph of election results in Central Okanagan—Similkameen—Nicola (minor parties that never got 2% of the vote or didn't run consistently are omitted)

2021 Canadian federal election
Party	Candidate	Votes	%	±%	Expenditures
Conservative	Dan Albas	30,563	47.60	–0.35	$56,271.94
New Democratic	Joan Phillip	13,813	21.51	+4.72	$22,670.21
Liberal	Sarah Eves	13,291	20.70	–4.33	$46,717.01
People's	Kathryn Mcdonald	4,788	7.46	+5.39	$9,005.35
Green	Brennan Wauters	1,755	2.73	–5.10	$93.76
Total valid votes/expense limit		64,210	99.28	–	$134,576.18
Total rejected ballots		466	0.72	+0.20	
Turnout		64,676	64.53	–3.75	
Eligible voters		100,229			
Conservative hold		Swing		–	
Source: Elections Canada

2019 Canadian federal election
Party	Candidate	Votes	%	±%	Expenditures
Conservative	Dan Albas	31,135	47.95	+8.39	$37,003.45
Liberal	Mary Ann Murphy	16,252	25.03	–12.18	$46,702.69
New Democratic	Joan Phillip	10,904	16.79	–2.51	$29,000.61
Green	Robert Mellalieu	5,086	7.83	+3.90	$800.00
People's	Allan Duncan	1,345	2.07	–	$3,071.16
Libertarian	Jesse Regier	213	0.33	–	none listed
Total valid votes/expense limit		64,935	99.48	–	$126,719.22
Total rejected ballots		341	0.52	+0.22	
Turnout		65,276	68.28	–2.68	
Eligible voters		95,597			
Conservative hold		Swing		+10.28	
Source: Elections Canada

2015 Canadian federal election
Party	Candidate	Votes	%	±%	Expenditures
Conservative	Dan Albas	24,517	39.56	–15.03	$88,485.90
Liberal	Karley Scott	23,059	37.21	+27.15	$41,589.74
New Democratic	Angelique Wood	11,961	19.30	–6.75	$56,283.82
Green	Robert Mellalieu	2,436	3.93	–3.83	$4,769.09
Total valid votes/expense limit		61,973	99.69	–	$239,209.56
Total rejected ballots		191	0.31	–	
Turnout		62,164	70.96	–	
Eligible voters		87,600			
Conservative notional hold		Swing		–21.09	
Source: Elections Canada

2011 federal election redistributed results
Party	Vote	%
Conservative	26,691	54.59
New Democratic	12,735	26.05
Liberal	4,917	10.06
Green	3,795	7.76
Others	754	1.54

== See also ==
- List of Canadian electoral districts
- Historical federal electoral districts of Canada
