= Dan Albas =

Canadian politician (born 1976)

Dan Albas MP
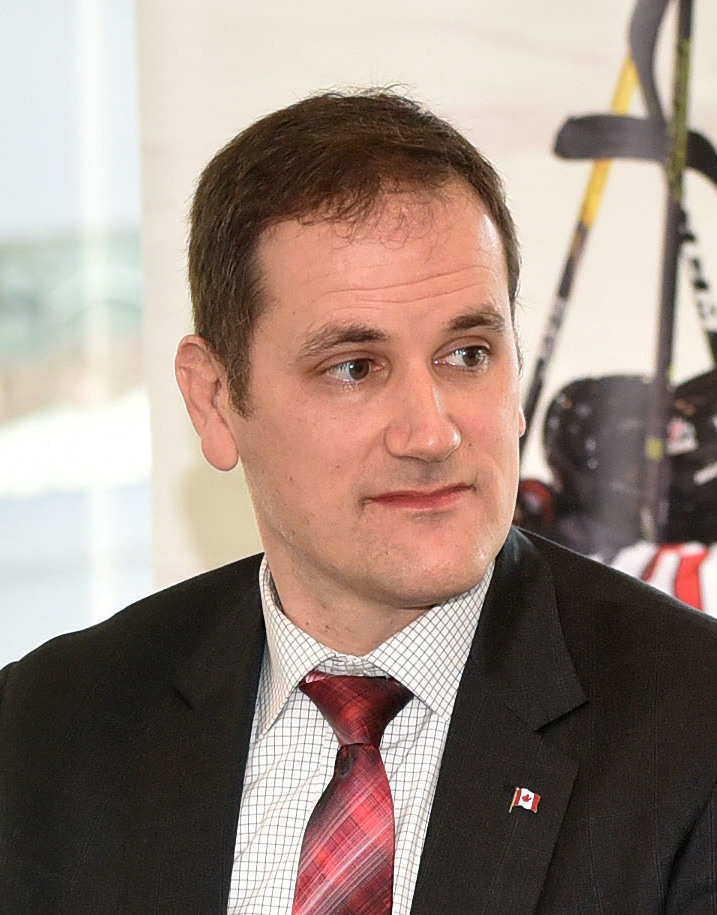
- Albas in 2018

Shadow Minister for Environment and Climate Change
- Incumbent
- Assumed office September 8, 2020
- Leader: Erin O'Toole; Candice Bergen; Pierre Poilievre
- Shadowing: Jonathan Wilkinson; Steven Guilbeault; Terry Duguid; Julie Dabrusin
- Preceded by: Kerry-Lynne Findlay

Shadow Minister for Employment and Workforce Development
- In office November 29, 2019 – September 7, 2020
- Leader: Andrew Scheer
- Shadowing: Carla Qualtrough
- Preceded by: John Barlow
- Succeeded by: Peter Kent

Shadow Minister for Innovation, Science & Economic Development
- In office September 7, 2018 – November 29, 2019 Serving with Michael Chong
- Leader: Andrew Scheer
- Shadowing: Navdeep Bains
- Preceded by: Maxime Bernier
- Succeeded by: Michelle Rempel

Shadow Minister for Small Business
- In office August 30, 2017 – September 6, 2018
- Leader: Andrew Scheer
- Shadowing: Bardish Chagger; Mary Ng
- Preceded by: Alice Wong
- Succeeded by: Blake Richards

Shadow Minister for Interprovincial Trade
- In office November 20, 2015 – October 15, 2016
- Leader: Rona Ambrose (interim)
- Shadowing: Navdeep Bains
- Preceded by: Peggy Nash
- Succeeded by: John Barlow

Member of Parliament for Okanagan Lake West—South Kelowna Central Okanagan—Similkameen—Nicola (2015–2025)
- Incumbent
- Assumed office October 19, 2015
- Preceded by: New riding

Member of Parliament for Okanagan—Coquihalla
- In office May 2, 2011 – October 19, 2015
- Preceded by: Stockwell Day
- Succeeded by: Riding redistributed

Penticton City Councillor
- In office December 1, 2008 – May 2, 2011

Personal details
- Born: December 1, 1976 (age 49) Victoria, British Columbia, Canada
- Party: Conservative
- Spouse: Tara
- Profession: martial arts instructor

Dan Albas MP (/ˈælbəs/ ALB-bəss; born December 1, 1976) is a Canadian politician, who was elected to the House of Commons of Canada in the 2011 election. He represents the electoral district of Okanagan Lake West—South Kelowna as a member of the Conservative Party.

In the 41st Canadian Parliament, Albas was appointed to the Standing Committee on Transport, Infrastructure and Communities and introduced one piece of legislation, a private members bill called An Act to amend the Importation of Intoxicating Liquors Act (interprovincial importation of wine for personal use) which would allow individuals to import wine from another province for personal consumption. He was elected vice chair of the Canadian House of Commons Standing Committee on Transport, Infrastructure and Communities in the 45th Canadian Parliament in 2025.

== Background ==
Born in 1976 in Victoria, British Columbia, Albas's family moved to Penticton when he was three years old. With his two sisters, he was raised mostly in Penticton by a father who worked as a lawyer and was active in conservative politics and a mother who worked as a social worker. The family spent a short time living in Whitehorse, Yukon, but moved to Alberta to seek medical treatment after an accident left Dan with severe burns over much of his body. They moved back to Penticton where Albas attended Penticton Secondary School and Okanagan University College. He worked as a martial arts instructor and in the late-1990s he opened his own martial arts studio, Kick City Martial Arts (later renamed Premier Martial Arts). In 2005 his studio held a fund-raiser in which pledges were taken by students who would break boards with martial arts moves in support of a Hurricane Katrina-related charity. The Penticton and Wine Country Chamber of Commerce named Albas the 2005 young entrepreneur of the year. In the same year Albas became a board member on the Chamber of Commerce and was appointed to represent the region on the British Columbia Chamber of Commerce. He helped merge the independent Chambers of Commerce in Penticton, Okanagan Falls, Oliver and Osoyoos into the South Okanagan Chamber of Commerce. He ran the regional United Way fund-raising campaign in 2007 and again in 2010. In 2008 he became active with a community group called the Penticton Housing Coalition advocating for affordable housing in the city, like secondary suites.

At the time of the 2025 Canadian federal election, he lived in Peachland, British Columbia.

== Municipal politics ==
In the 2008 local government elections the 31-year-old Albas ran, and placed first with 5,656 votes, for a seat on the Penticton City Council. Albas became known as the most fiscally-conservative councillor on an already fiscally-conservative council. Beyond the measures agreed to by the council, Albas sought to avoid having the city purchase or pay for a fire-rescue boat, the restoration of the SS Sicamous, landscaping improvements at the South Okanagan Events Centre and the beaches, mobile radar speed signs, building an agricultural centre in the downtown area and unsuccessfully tried to defer the hiring of additional fire department officers and eliminate a 2.1% raise in councillor salaries (though all were approved by council despite Albas opposing the motions). He voted against opening public library on Sundays to avoid the extra costs and against raising the electricity rate to match FortisBC rate increases (the city purchases power from FortisBC and sells it to citizens), and requiring developers who work with the city to have professional liability insurance, though all were approved by council. Initiatives that Albas began or assisted with included bylaw enforcement fines for aggressive pan-handling, keeping a Canada Post outlet in the downtown area. Believing public transit should be funded through user fees, he voted against acquiring new buses from BC Transit unless it was paid for through higher fares and later sought to raise fares by 25% to fund operational costs. He drew criticism as a councillor for interfering with staff management and for posting speculative comments on his blog regarding privatization of city services. Albas was appointed to be a director at the Regional District of Okanagan-Similkameen where he was successful he reducing the Regional District's contribution to the Okanagan Film Commission by 50%; Albas became an alternate director in 2009 and 2010.

== Federal politics ==
In March 2011, after Stockwell Day, the MP for Okanagan—Coquihalla for the last 11 years, unexpectedly announced his retirement, a nomination election was held to seek his replacement as the Conservative Party nominee. Albas faced two other candidates: Marshall Neufeld who had worked as Day's parliamentary assistant and West Kelowna landscaper Russell Ensign. A fourth candidate, Chamber of Commerce president Jason Cox, campaigned but missed the deadline for submitting his nomination papers. The nomination election came under criticism from Conservative Party members for being rushed; the vote was held only 10 days after Day's announcement leaving several potential candidates unable to participate and leading to accusations that the three candidates had been given advanced notice of events.

The 2011 federal election campaign began soon after the nomination vote. Albas faced former Summerland councillor David Finnis of the New Democratic Party, semi-retired Ashcroft businessman John Kidder for the Liberal Party, Penticton marketer Dan Bouchard for the Green Party, Penticton doctor Dietrich Wittel (independent), and West Kelowna real estate agent Sean Upshaw who campaign in protest of the Conservative Party nomination process which he felt excluded from due to its rushed vote. Albas won the election in the Okanagan—Coquihalla riding with 54% of the vote and his Conservative Party formed a majority government.

=== 41st Canadian Parliament ===
When the 41st Parliament began Albas was appointed to the 'Standing Committee on Transport, Infrastructure and Communities' and the 'Standing Joint Committee on Scrutiny of Regulations'. In the House of Commons, Albas introduced Private Members Bill C-311, entitled An Act to amend the Importation of Intoxicating Liquors Act (interprovincial importation of wine for personal use) (Bill C-311) which would allow individuals to import wine from another province for the purpose of personal consumption. The existing law, which dates back to the Prohibition era, only allows provincial liquor boards to do this.

Some 83 years ago during the prohibition era, a law was passed to make it illegal for everyday citizens to transport or ship wine across provincial borders. It is, for all intents and purposes, an interprovincial trade barrier, meaning that a winery in Quebec cannot legally send a bottle of wine to a customer in Alberta. Here is where it gets more redundant. That same Quebec winery that cannot legally send a bottle of wine to Alberta can send that exact same bottle of wine to Texas. Many small Canadian wineries can access markets outside our borders more easily than they can inside our own great country.

— Mr. Dan Albas (Okanagan—Coquihalla, CPC), October 20, 2011

Bill C-311 received first reading on October 3, second reading on December 7, 2011. It received unanimous support by all parties at third reading on June 6, 2012.

On Sept. 19, 2013, he became Parliamentary Secretary to the President of the Treasury Board.

=== 42nd Canadian Parliament ===
Albas won re-election 2015 Canadian federal election, though his Conservative Party lost seats overall and formed the Official Opposition in the 42nd Canadian Parliament. Under interim leader Rona Ambrose, Albas was appointed to be the critic of interprovincial trade until October 2016 when he was reassigned to be deputy critic (to Gérard Deltell) of finance. In the 2017 Conservative Party of Canada leadership election, Albas endorsed Maxime Bernier. After Andrew Scheer won the leadership race, Scheer reassigned Albas to be critic of small business issues. Albas introduced several private member bills into the House of Commons during this parliament, though none advanced beyond first reading. Bill C-379, An Act to amend the Bank Act (use of word "bank", "banker" or "banking"), proposed to allow credit unions and caisses populaires to use the terms bank, banker and banking to describe the services they offer. Bill C-410, An Act to amend the Bankruptcy and Insolvency Act (property of bankrupt – exclusion), proposed to protect Registered Education Savings Plan or Registered Disability Savings Plan from creditors in a bankruptcy settlement; the Minister of Finance subsequently incorporated this protection of Registered Disability Savings Plan funds in Bill C-97; in response, Albas introduced Bill C-453 which contained the same language but specifically extended the protection to Registered Education Savings Plan as well. Bill C-447, An Act to amend the Criminal Code (aggravating circumstance — evacuation order or emergency), proposed to make taking advantage of a natural disaster or other emergency to commit a crime as an aggravating circumstance. Bill C-452, An Act to amend the Income Tax Act (gift in virtual currency), proposed to exempt from the capital gains tax funds acquired from the appreciation of a virtual currency which are donated to a charity. (Note: Private Member Bills that impose a cost on the Treasury Board are not eligible for adoption as Private Member Bills.)

=== 43rd Canadian Parliament ===
On September 8, 2020, Albas was appointed as the Opposition Critic for Environment and Climate Change by Erin O'Toole.

== Committee assignments ==
=== Current ===
- Committee on Environment and Sustainable Development (Vice Chair)
  - Subcommittee on Agenda and Procedure of the Standing Committee on Environment and Sustainable Development

=== Previous ===
- Special Committee on Canada-China Relations (January 2020 to August 2020)
- Committee on Human Resources, Skills and Social Development and the Status of Persons with Disabilities (February 2020 to August 2020)

== Election history ==
2025 Canadian federal election: Okanagan Lake West—South Kelowna
Party	Candidate	Votes	%	±%	Expenditures
Conservative	Dan Albas	33,219	50.92	+2.57	$76,604.00
Liberal	Juliette Sicotte	28,827	44.19	+20.97	$44,087.00
New Democratic	Harpreet Badohal	2,189	3.36	–15.53	$20,508.97
Green	Louise Lecouffe	602	0.92	–1.83	none listed
People's	Debbie Robinson	307	0.47	–6.32	none listed
Canadian Future	Gary Suddard	90	0.14	–	none listed
Total valid votes/expense limit		65,234	99.42	–	$135,076.06
Total rejected ballots		382	0.58	–	
Turnout		65,616	72.83	–	
Eligible voters		90,095			
Conservative notional hold		Swing		–9.20	
Source: Elections Canada

2021 Canadian federal election: Central Okanagan—Similkameen—Nicola
Party	Candidate	Votes	%	±%	Expenditures
Conservative	Dan Albas	30,563	47.60	–0.35	$56,271.94
New Democratic	Joan Phillip	13,813	21.51	+4.72	$22,670.21
Liberal	Sarah Eves	13,291	20.70	–4.33	$46,717.01
People's	Kathryn Mcdonald	4,788	7.46	+5.39	$9,005.35
Green	Brennan Wauters	1,755	2.73	–5.10	$93.76
Total valid votes/expense limit		64,210	99.28	–	$134,576.18
Total rejected ballots		466	0.72	+0.20	
Turnout		64,676	64.53	–3.75	
Eligible voters		100,229			
Conservative hold		Swing		–	
Source: Elections Canada

2019 Canadian federal election: Central Okanagan—Similkameen—Nicola
Party	Candidate	Votes	%	±%	Expenditures
Conservative	Dan Albas	31,135	47.95	+8.39	$37,003.45
Liberal	Mary Ann Murphy	16,252	25.03	–12.18	$46,702.69
New Democratic	Joan Phillip	10,904	16.79	–2.51	$29,000.61
Green	Robert Mellalieu	5,086	7.83	+3.90	$800.00
People's	Allan Duncan	1,345	2.07	–	$3,071.16
Libertarian	Jesse Regier	213	0.33	–	none listed
Total valid votes/expense limit		64,935	99.48	–	$126,719.22
Total rejected ballots		341	0.52	+0.22	
Turnout		65,276	68.28	–2.68	
Eligible voters		95,597			
Conservative hold		Swing		+10.28	
Source: Elections Canada

2015 Canadian federal election: Central Okanagan—Similkameen—Nicola
Party	Candidate	Votes	%	±%	Expenditures
Conservative	Dan Albas	24,517	39.56	–15.03	$88,485.90
Liberal	Karley Scott	23,059	37.21	+27.15	$41,589.74
New Democratic	Angelique Wood	11,961	19.30	–6.75	$56,283.82
Green	Robert Mellalieu	2,436	3.93	–3.83	$4,769.09
Total valid votes/expense limit		61,973	99.69	–	$239,209.56
Total rejected ballots		191	0.31	–	
Turnout		62,164	70.96	–	
Eligible voters		87,600			
Conservative notional hold		Swing		–21.09	
Source: Elections Canada

2011 Canadian federal election: Okanagan—Coquihalla
Party	Candidate	Votes	%	±%	Expenditures
Conservative	Dan Albas	28,525	53.58	–4.55	$72,229.02
New Democratic	David Finnis	12,853	24.14	+7.50	$6,933.05
Liberal	John Kidder	5,815	10.92	–0.97	$58,313.83
Green	Dan Bouchard	5,005	9.40	–3.94	$8,848.42
Independent	Sean Upshaw	860	1.62	–	$1,935.62
Independent	Dietrich Wittel	180	0.34	–	none listed
Total valid votes/expense limit		53,238	99.77	–	$95,494.58
Total rejected ballots		121	0.23	–0.07	
Turnout		53,359	61.91	+2.28	
Eligible voters		86,195			
Conservative hold		Swing		–6.03	
Source: Elections Canada
