= Kelowna—Lake Country (federal electoral district) =

Federal electoral district in British Columbia, Canada

British Columbia electoral district
- Interactive map of riding boundaries

Federal electoral district
- Legislature: House of Commons
MP
Tracy Gray
Conservative
- District created: 1996
- First contested: 1997
- Last contested: 2021
- District webpage: profile, map

Demographics
- Population (2011): 110,051
- Electors (2019): 99,992
- Area (km²): 1,670
- Pop. density (per km²): 65.9
- Census subdivision: Kelowna (part)

Kelowna—Lake Country was a federal electoral district in the province of British Columbia, Canada, that has been represented in the House of Commons of Canada from 1997 to 2023. From 1997 to 2003, the district was known simply as Kelowna.

== History ==
This district was created as Kelowna electoral district in 1996 from a portion of Okanagan Centre district.

In 2003, it was renamed Kelowna—Lake Country.

The 2012 federal electoral boundaries redistribution concluded that the electoral boundaries of Kelowna—Lake Country should be adjusted, and a modified electoral district of the same name would be contested in future elections. The redefined Kelowna—Lake Country lost a portion of its current territory to the new district of Central Okanagan—Similkameen—Nicola. These new boundaries were legally defined in the 2013 representation order, which came into effect upon the call of the 2015 Canadian federal election.

As a result of the 2022 Canadian federal electoral redistribution, the district was dissolved, with parts of the district moving to a newly redefined Kelowna district, the Vernon—Lake Country—Monashee district, and the Okanagan Lake West—South Kelowna district.

== Demographics ==
Panethnic groups in Kelowna—Lake Country (2011−2021)
| Panethnic group | 2021 | | 2016 | | 2011 | |
| Panethnic group | Pop. | % | Pop. | % | Pop. | % |
|---|---|---|---|---|---|---|
| European (Note: Statistic includes all persons that did not make up part of a visible minority or an indigenous identity.) | 109,310 | 81.22% | 100,480 | 85.46% | 96,565 | 89.09% |
| Indigenous | 7,940 | 5.9% | 6,605 | 5.62% | 4,540 | 4.19% |
| South Asian | 5,955 | 4.42% | 3,170 | 2.7% | 2,505 | 2.31% |
| East Asian (Note: Statistic includes total responses of "Chinese", "Korean", and "Japanese" under visible minority section on census.) | 4,005 | 2.98% | 3,045 | 2.59% | 2,340 | 2.16% |
| Southeast Asian (Note: Statistic includes total responses of "Filipino" and "Southeast Asian" under visible minority section on census.) | 2,880 | 2.14% | 1,800 | 1.53% | 920 | 0.85% |
| African | 1,515 | 1.13% | 825 | 0.7% | 420 | 0.39% |
| Latin American | 1,090 | 0.81% | 655 | 0.56% | 475 | 0.44% |
| Middle Eastern (Note: Statistic includes total responses of "West Asian" and "Arab" under visible minority section on census.) | 995 | 0.74% | 455 | 0.39% | 225 | 0.21% |
| Other (Note: Statistic includes total responses of "Visible minority, n.i.e." and "Multiple visible minorities" under visible minority section on census.) | 875 | 0.65% | 520 | 0.44% | 400 | 0.37% |
| Total responses | 134,580 | 98.75% | 117,570 | 98.48% | 108,390 | 98.49% |
| Total population | 136,290 | 100% | 119,388 | 100% | 110,051 | 100% |
Notes: Totals greater than 100% due to multiple origin responses. Demographics based on 2012 Canadian federal electoral redistribution riding boundaries.

== Members of Parliament ==
Kelowna—Lake Country
| Parliament | Years | Member | Party |
|---|---|---|---|
Kelowna—Lake Country
| 38th | 2004–2006 | Werner Schmidt | Conservative |
| 39th | 2006–2008 | Ron Cannan | Conservative |
| 40th | 2008–2011 | Ron Cannan | Conservative |
| 41st | 2011–2015 | Ron Cannan | Conservative |
| 42nd | 2015–2019 | Stephen Fuhr | Liberal |
| 43rd | 2019–2021 | Tracy Gray | Conservative |
| 44th | 2021–2025 | Tracy Gray | Conservative |
Riding dissolved into Kelowna, Vernon—Lake Country—Monashee, and Okanagan Lake West—South Kelowna

== Election results ==
=== Kelowna—Lake Country, 2003–2021 ===
Graph of election results in Kelowna—Lake Country (minor parties that never got 2% of the vote or didn't run consistently are omitted)

2021 Canadian federal election
| Party | Candidate | Votes | % | ±% | Expenditures |
|---|---|---|---|---|---|
| Conservative | Tracy Gray | 30,409 | 45.29 | –0.28 | $120,346.39 |
| Liberal | Tim Krupa | 17,767 | 26.46 | –6.27 | $120,498.91 |
| New Democratic | Cade Desjarlais | 12,204 | 18.18 | +6.05 | $5,052.71 |
| People's | Brian Rogers | 4,688 | 6.98 | +5.21 | none listed |
| Green | Imre Szeman | 2,074 | 3.09 | –4.39 | $14,210.33 |
| Total valid votes/expense limit | | 67,142 | 99.49 | – | $131,152.01 |
| Total rejected ballots | | 346 | 0.51 | +0.07 | |
| Turnout | | 67,488 | 63.32 | –5.08 | |
| Eligible voters | | 106,585 | | | |
| Conservative hold | | Swing | | +3.01 | |
Source: Elections Canada

2019 Canadian federal election
| Party | Candidate | Votes | % | ±% | Expenditures |
|---|---|---|---|---|---|
| Conservative | Tracy Gray | 31,497 | 45.57 | +5.82 | $109,422.53 |
| Liberal | Stephen Fuhr | 22,627 | 32.74 | –13.42 | $103,263.61 |
| New Democratic | Justin Kulik | 8,381 | 12.13 | –1.96 | $8,811.35 |
| Green | Travis Ashley | 5,171 | 7.48 | – | $6,745.70 |
| People's | John Barr | 1,225 | 1.77 | – | $7,213.32 |
| Independent | Daniel Joseph | 152 | 0.22 | – | none listed |
| Independent | Nicola-Silverado Socrates | 67 | 0.10 | – | none listed |
| Total valid votes/expense limit | | 69,120 | 99.56 | – | $123,247.35 |
| Total rejected ballots | | 305 | 0.44 | +0.08 | |
| Turnout | | 69,425 | 68.39 | –2.26 | |
| Eligible voters | | 101,507 | | | |
| Conservative gain from Liberal | | Swing | | +9.62 | |
Source: Elections Canada

2015 Canadian federal election
| Party | Candidate | Votes | % | ±% | Expenditures |
|---|---|---|---|---|---|
| Liberal | Stephen Fuhr | 29,614 | 46.16 | +34.69 | $127,725.08 |
| Conservative | Ron Cannan | 25,502 | 39.75 | –18.63 | $70,942.48 |
| New Democratic | Norah Mary Bowman | 9,039 | 14.09 | –7.28 | $33,945.86 |
| Total valid votes/expense limit | | 64,155 | 99.64 | – | $228,718.18 |
| Total rejected ballots | | 230 | 0.36 | | |
| Turnout | | 64,385 | 70.65 | | |
| Eligible voters | | 91,131 | | | |
| Liberal gain from Conservative | | Swing | | +26.66 | |
Source: Elections Canada

2011 federal election redistributed results
| Party | Vote | % |
|---|---|---|
| Conservative | 28,220 | 58.38 |
| New Democratic | 10,329 | 21.37 |
| Liberal | 5,546 | 11.47 |
| Green | 4,244 | 8.78 |

2011 Canadian federal election
| Party | Candidate | Votes | % | ±% | Expenditures |
|---|---|---|---|---|---|
| Conservative | Ron Cannan | 34,566 | 57.40 | +1.46 | $88,677.16 |
| New Democratic | Patricia (Tisha) Kalmanovitch | 13,322 | 22.12 | +7.00 | $11,822.65 |
| Liberal | Kris Stewart | 7,069 | 11.74 | –3.11 | $49,198.04 |
| Green | Alice Hooper | 5,265 | 8.74 | –4.97 | $12,374.76 |
| Total valid votes/expense limit | | 60,222 | 99.76 | – | $100,986.29 |
| Total rejected ballots | | 146 | 0.24 | –0.05 | |
| Turnout | | 60,368 | 59.84 | +1.08 | |
| Eligible voters | | 100,884 | | | |
| Conservative hold | | Swing | | +4.23 | |
Source: Elections Canada

2008 Canadian federal election
| Party | Candidate | Votes | % | ±% | Expenditures |
|---|---|---|---|---|---|
| Conservative | Ron Cannan | 31,907 | 55.94 | +6.77 | $67,837.92 |
| New Democratic | Tish Lakes | 8,624 | 15.12 | –1.53 | $8,272.92 |
| Liberal | Diana Cabott | 8,469 | 14.85 | –10.99 | $37,536.07 |
| Green | Angela Reid | 7,821 | 13.71 | +5.75 | $13,138.26 |
| Communist | Mark Haley | 218 | 0.38 | – | $566.35 |
| Total valid votes/expense limit | | 57,039 | 99.71 | – | $95,647.41 |
| Total rejected ballots | | 168 | 0.29 | +0.09 | |
| Turnout | | 57,207 | 58.76 | –4.63 | |
| Eligible voters | | 97,351 | | | |
| Conservative hold | | Swing | | +4.15 | |
Source: Elections Canada

2006 Canadian federal election
| Party | Candidate | Votes | % | ±% | Expenditures |
|---|---|---|---|---|---|
| Conservative | Ron Cannan | 28,174 | 49.17 | +1.17 | $63,555.52 |
| Liberal | Vern Nielsen | 14,807 | 25.84 | –0.66 | $50,271.52 |
| New Democratic | Kevin M. Hagglund | 9,538 | 16.64 | –0.16 | $12,393.35 |
| Green | Angela Reid | 4,562 | 7.96 | +0.66 | $5,359.73 |
| Canadian Action | David Thomson | 223 | 0.39 | –0.11 | $1,290.73 |
| Total valid votes/expense limit | | 57,304 | 99.80 | – | $85,928.84 |
| Total rejected ballots | | 116 | 0.20 | – | |
| Turnout | | 57,420 | 63.40 | – | |
| Eligible voters | | 90,574 | | | |
| Conservative hold | | Swing | | – | |
Source: Elections Canada

2004 Canadian federal election: Kelowna
| Party | Candidate | Votes | % | ±% | Expenditures |
|---|---|---|---|---|---|
| Conservative | Werner Schmidt | 25,553 | 48.00 | –19.75 | $60,102.04 |
| Liberal | Vern Nielson | 14,109 | 26.50 | +2.64 | $55,532.88 |
| New Democratic | Starleigh Grass | 8,954 | 16.82 | +10.54 | $14,000.99 |
| Green | Kevin Ade | 3,903 | 7.33 | – | $4,993.86 |
| Marijuana | Huguette Plourde | 447 | 0.84 | – | none listed |
| Canadian Action | Michael Cassidyne-Hook | 271 | 0.51 | –1.60 | none listed |
| Total valid votes/expense limit | | 53,237 | 99.70 | – | $81,764.67 |
| Total rejected ballots | | 159 | 0.30 | –0.09 | |
| Turnout | | 53,396 | 62.14 | –1.88 | |
| Eligible voters | | 85,932 | | | |
| Conservative hold | | Swing | | –9.88 | |
Source: Elections Canada

== See also ==
- List of Canadian electoral districts
- Historical federal electoral districts of Canada
