= Al Horning =

Canadian politician (1939–2023)

Member of Parliament for Okanagan Centre
- In office November 21, 1988 – October 25, 1993
- Preceded by: Riding Established
- Succeeded by: Werner Schmidt

Member of the Legislative Assembly of British Columbia for Kelowna-Lake Country
- In office May 17, 2005 – May 12, 2009
- Preceded by: John Weisbeck
- Succeeded by: Norm Letnick

Personal details
- Born: June 11, 1939 Regina, Saskatchewan, Canada
- Died: March 20, 2023 (aged 83) Kelowna, British Columbia, Canada
- Party: Progressive Conservative; BC Liberal
- Spouse: Donna Ann Wilderman (m. 1960; died 2019)
- Profession: Businessman

Edward Allan Horning (June 11, 1939 – March 20, 2023) was a Canadian politician. His career included real estate, shipping, business and orchards.

Horning attended secondary school at Rutland, British Columbia then studied at the University of British Columbia. In 1980, he became an alderman for the Kelowna City Council, where he remained until 1988.

Horning was elected to the House of Commons of Canada in the 1988 federal election at the Okanagan Centre electoral district for the Progressive Conservative party. He served in the 34th Canadian Parliament but lost to Werner Schmidt of the Reform Party in the 1993 federal election. He made another unsuccessful bid to return to federal Parliament in the 1997 federal election at the Kelowna riding. In 2002, he returned to Kelowna City Council as a councillor.

In the 2005 provincial election in British Columbia, Horning was elected to the Legislative Assembly of British Columbia, representing Kelowna-Lake Country as a member of the BC Liberals. He did not run for re-election in the 2009 election.

Horning died in Kelowna on March 20, 2023, at the age of 83.
