= Okanagan Centre =

Former federal electoral district in British Columbia, Canada

British Columbia electoral district

Defunct federal electoral district
- Legislature: House of Commons
- District created: 1987
- District abolished: 1996
- First contested: 1988
- Last contested: 1993

Okanagan Centre was a federal electoral district in British Columbia, Canada, that was represented in the House of Commons of Canada from 1988 to 1997. This riding was created in 1987 from parts of Okanagan North and Okanagan—Similkameen, and eliminated in 1996 when it was merged into Kelowna.

Okanagan Centre consisted of the Central Okanagan Regional District.

== Members of Parliament ==
Parliament	Years	Member	Party
Riding created from Okanagan North and Okanagan—Similkameen
34th	1988–1993	Al Horning	Progressive Conservative
35th	1993–1997	Werner Schmidt	Reform
Riding dissolved into Kelowna

== Election results ==
1993 Canadian federal election
Party	Candidate	Votes	%	±%
Reform	Werner Schmidt	30,703	46.62	+32.09
Liberal	Murli Pendharkar	15,688	23.82	+6.76
Progressive Conservative	Al Horning	12,629	19.18	–18.08
New Democratic	Bryan McIver	4,562	6.93	–23.28
National	Jack Davis	1,082	1.64	–
Green	David Hughes	666	1.01	+0.06
Natural Law	Douglas Walker	211	0.32	–
Canada Party	Faye Stroo	179	0.27	–
Independent	Trevor L. Adams	134	0.20	–
Total valid votes		65,854	99.61	
Total rejected ballots		257	0.39	+0.04
Turnout		66,111	70.63	–7.93
Eligible voters		93,596		
Reform gain from Progressive Conservative		Swing		+12.67
Source: Elections Canada

1988 Canadian federal election
Party	Candidate	Votes	%	±%
Progressive Conservative	Al Horning	19,485	37.25	–
New Democratic	Bryan McIver	15,800	30.21	–
Liberal	Murli Pendharkar	8,922	17.06	–
Reform	Werner Schmidt	7,599	14.53	–
Green	David Hughes	496	0.95	–
Total valid votes		52,302	99.66	
Total rejected ballots		181	0.34	–
Turnout		52,483	78.56	–
Eligible voters		66,806		
Progressive Conservative notional hold		Swing		–
This riding was created from parts of Okanagan North and Okanagan—Similkameen, both of which elected a Progressive Conservative in the previous election.
Source: Elections Canada

== See also ==
- List of Canadian electoral districts
- Historical federal electoral districts of Canada
