= Canadian House of Commons Standing Committee on Transport, Infrastructure and Communities =

Standing committee of the House of Commons of Canada

The Standing Committee on Transport, Infrastructure and Communities (TRAN) is a committee in the House of Commons of Canada. It focuses on transport, infrastructure and communities. Before the 39th Parliament (2006–2008), the committee was known as just the Standing Committee on Transport.

== Studies ==
- Canada Post
- Rail Safety
- Safety solutions on all modes of transport
- Transport security
- Study on the review of Toronto Port Authority Report

== Membership ==
As of the 45th Canadian Parliament:

Party	Member	District
Liberal	Peter Schiefke, chair	Vaudreuil, QC
Conservative	Dan Albas, vice chair	Okanagan Lake West—South Kelowna, BC
Bloc Québécois	Xavier Barsalou-Duval, vice chair	Pierre-Boucher—Les Patriotes—Verchères, QC
Liberal	Will Greaves	Victoria, BC
Liberal	Mike Kelloway	Sydney—Glace Bay, NS
Liberal	Stéphane Lauzon	Argenteuil—La Petite-Nation, QC
Conservative	Philip Lawrence	Northumberland—Clarke, ON
Conservative	Leslyn Lewis	Haldimand—Norfolk, ON
Conservative	Dan Muys	Flamborough—Glanbrook—Brant North, ON
Liberal	Chi Nguyen	Spadina—Harbourfront, ON

== Subcommittees ==
- Subcommittee on Agenda and Procedure (STRA)

== See also ==
- Canadian Senate Standing Committee on Transport and Communication
- Transport Canada
