= List of Canadian electoral districts =

Map of the ridings as they existed prior to the 2025 election, showing major city areas as insets

This is a list of Canada's 343 federal electoral districts (commonly referred to as ridings in Canadian English) as defined by the 2023 Representation Order.

Canadian federal electoral districts elect members of Parliament to the House of Commons of Canada in every election. Provincial electoral districts often have names similar to their local federal counterpart but usually have different geographic boundaries. Canadians elected members for each federal electoral district most recently in the 2025 federal election on April 28, 2025.

Four districts established by the British North America Act 1867 have existed continuously without changes to their names and without being abolished and reconstituted as a different riding due to redistricting: Beauce (Quebec), Halifax (Nova Scotia), Shefford (Quebec), and Simcoe North (Ontario). These districts, however, have undergone territorial changes since their inception.

== Alberta – 37 seats ==
- Airdrie—Cochrane
- Battle River—Crowfoot
- Bow River
- Calgary Centre
- Calgary Confederation
- Calgary Crowfoot
- Calgary East
- Calgary Heritage
- Calgary McKnight
- Calgary Midnapore
- Calgary Nose Hill
- Calgary Shepard
- Calgary Signal Hill
- Calgary Skyview
- Edmonton Centre
- Edmonton Gateway
- Edmonton Griesbach
- Edmonton Manning
- Edmonton Northwest
- Edmonton Riverbend
- Edmonton Southeast
- Edmonton Strathcona
- Edmonton West
- Foothills
- Fort McMurray—Cold Lake
- Grande Prairie
- Lakeland
- Leduc—Wetaskiwin
- Lethbridge
- Medicine Hat—Cardston—Warner
- Parkland
- Peace River—Westlock
- Ponoka—Didsbury
- Red Deer
- Sherwood Park—Fort Saskatchewan
- St. Albert—Sturgeon River
- Yellowhead

== British Columbia – 43 seats ==
- Abbotsford—South Langley
- Burnaby Central
- Burnaby North—Seymour
- Cariboo—Prince George—Omineca
- Chilliwack—Hope
- Cloverdale—Langley City
- Columbia—Kootenay—Southern Rockies
- Coquitlam—Port Coquitlam
- Courtenay—Alberni
- Cowichan—Malahat—Langford
- Delta
- Esquimalt—Saanich—Sooke
- Fleetwood—Port Kells
- Kamloops—Shuswap—Central Rockies
- Kamloops—Thompson—Nicola
- Kelowna
- Langley Township—Fraser Heights
- Mission—Matsqui—Abbotsford
- Nanaimo—Ladysmith
- New Westminster—Burnaby—Maillardville
- North Island—Powell River
- North Vancouver—Capilano
- Okanagan Lake West—South Kelowna
- Pitt Meadows—Maple Ridge
- Port Moody—Coquitlam
- Prince George—Peace River—Northern Rockies
- Richmond Centre—Marpole
- Richmond East—Steveston
- Saanich—Gulf Islands
- Similkameen—South Okanagan—West Kootenay
- Skeena—Bulkley Valley
- South Surrey—White Rock
- Surrey Centre
- Surrey Newton
- Vancouver Centre
- Vancouver East
- Vancouver Fraserview—South Burnaby
- Vancouver Granville
- Vancouver Kingsway
- Vancouver Quadra
- Vernon—Lake Country—Monashee
- Victoria
- West Vancouver—Sunshine Coast—Sea to Sky Country

== Manitoba – 14 seats ==
- Brandon—Souris
- Churchill—Keewatinook Aski
- Elmwood—Transcona
- Kildonan—St. Paul
- Portage—Lisgar
- Provencher
- Riding Mountain
- Selkirk—Interlake—Eastman
- St. Boniface—St. Vital
- Winnipeg Centre
- Winnipeg North
- Winnipeg South
- Winnipeg South Centre
- Winnipeg West

== New Brunswick – 10 seats ==
- Acadie—Bathurst
- Beauséjour
- Fredericton—Oromocto
- Fundy Royal
- Madawaska—Restigouche
- Miramichi—Grand Lake
- Moncton—Dieppe
- New Brunswick Southwest
- Saint John—Kennebecasis
- Tobique—Mactaquac

== Newfoundland and Labrador – 7 seats ==
- Avalon
- Cape Spear—Mount Pearl—Paradise
- Coast of Bays—Central—Notre Dame
- Labrador
- Long Range Mountains
- St. John's East
- The Eastern Peninsulas

== Northwest Territories – 1 seat ==
- Northwest Territories

== Nova Scotia – 11 seats ==
- Acadie—Annapolis
- Cape Breton—Canso—Antigonish
- Central Nova
- Cumberland—Colchester
- Dartmouth—Cole Harbour
- Halifax
- Halifax West—Peggy's Cove
- Kings—Hants
- Sackville—Bedford—Preston
- South Shore—St. Margarets
- Sydney—Glace Bay

== Nunavut – 1 seat ==
- Nunavut

== Ontario – 122 seats ==
- Ajax
- Algonquin—Renfrew—Pembroke
- Aurora—Oak Ridges—Richmond Hill
- Barrie South—Innisfil
- Barrie—Springwater—Oro-Medonte
- Bay of Quinte
- Beaches—East York
- Bowmanville—Oshawa North
- Brampton Centre
- Brampton—Chinguacousy Park
- Brampton East
- Brampton North—Caledon
- Brampton South
- Brampton West
- Brantford—Brant South
- Bruce—Grey—Owen Sound
- Burlington
- Burlington North—Milton West
- Cambridge
- Carleton
- Chatham-Kent—Leamington
- Davenport
- Don Valley North
- Don Valley West
- Dufferin—Caledon
- Eglinton—Lawrence
- Elgin—St. Thomas—London South
- Essex
- Etobicoke Centre
- Etobicoke—Lakeshore
- Etobicoke North
- Flamborough—Glanbrook—Brant North
- Guelph
- Haldimand—Norfolk
- Haliburton—Kawartha Lakes
- Hamilton Centre
- Hamilton East—Stoney Creek
- Hamilton Mountain
- Hamilton West—Ancaster—Dundas
- Hastings—Lennox and Addington—Tyendinaga
- Humber River—Black Creek
- Huron—Bruce
- Kanata
- Kapuskasing—Timmins—Mushkegowuk
- Kenora—Kiiwetinoong
- Kingston and the Islands
- King—Vaughan
- Kitchener Centre
- Kitchener—Conestoga
- Kitchener South—Hespeler
- Lanark—Frontenac
- Leeds—Grenville—Thousand Islands—Rideau Lakes
- London Centre
- London—Fanshawe
- London West
- Markham—Stouffville
- Markham—Thornhill
- Markham—Unionville
- Middlesex—London
- Milton East—Halton Hills South
- Mississauga Centre
- Mississauga East—Cooksville
- Mississauga—Erin Mills
- Mississauga—Lakeshore
- Mississauga—Malton
- Mississauga—Streetsville
- Nepean
- Newmarket—Aurora
- Niagara Falls—Niagara-on-the-Lake
- Niagara South
- Niagara West
- Nipissing—Timiskaming
- Northumberland—Clarke
- North York
- Oakville East
- Oakville West
- Orléans
- Oshawa
- Ottawa Centre
- Ottawa South
- Ottawa—Vanier—Gloucester
- Ottawa West—Nepean
- Oxford
- Parry Sound—Muskoka
- Perth—Wellington
- Peterborough
- Pickering—Brooklin
- Prescott—Russell—Cumberland
- Richmond Hill South
- Sarnia—Lambton—Bkejwanong
- Sault Ste. Marie—Algoma
- Scarborough—Agincourt
- Scarborough Centre—Don Valley East
- Scarborough—Guildwood—Rouge Park
- Scarborough North
- Scarborough Southwest
- Scarborough—Woburn
- Simcoe—Grey
- Simcoe North
- Spadina—Harbourfront
- St. Catharines
- Stormont—Dundas—Glengarry
- Sudbury
- Sudbury East—Manitoulin—Nickel Belt
- Taiaiako'n—Parkdale—High Park
- Thornhill
- Thunder Bay—Rainy River
- Thunder Bay—Superior North
- Toronto Centre
- Toronto—Danforth
- Toronto—St. Paul's
- University—Rosedale
- Vaughan—Woodbridge
- Waterloo
- Wellington—Halton Hills North
- Whitby
- Willowdale
- Windsor—Tecumseh—Lakeshore
- Windsor West
- York—Durham
- York South—Weston—Etobicoke
- York—South Simcoe

== Prince Edward Island – 4 seats ==
- Cardigan
- Charlottetown
- Egmont
- Malpeque

== Quebec – 78 seats ==
- Abitibi—Baie-James—Nunavik—Eeyou
- Abitibi—Témiscamingue
- Ahuntsic-Cartierville
- Alfred-Pellan
- Argenteuil—Papineau—Des Collines
- Beauce
- Beauport—Limoilou
- Bécancour—Nicolet—Saurel—Alnôbak
- Bellechasse—Les Etchemins—Lévis
- Beloeil—Chambly
- Berthier—Maskinongé
- Bourassa
- Brome—Missisquoi
- Brossard—Saint-Lambert
- Charlesbourg—Haute-Saint-Charles
- Châteauguay—Les Jardins-de-Napierville
- Chicoutimi—Le Fjord
- Compton—Stanstead
- Côte-du-Sud—Rivière-du-Loup—Kataskomiq—Témiscouata
- Côte-Nord—Kawawachikamach—Nitassinan
- Dorval—Lachine—LaSalle
- Drummond
- Gaspésie—Les Îles-de-la-Madeleine—Listuguj
- Gatineau
- Hochelaga—Rosemont-Est
- Honoré-Mercier
- Hull—Aylmer
- Joliette—Manawan
- Jonquière—Hébertville—Pays-des-Bleuets
- La Pointe-de-l'Île
- La Prairie—Atateken
- Lac-Saint-Jean
- Lac-Saint-Louis
- LaSalle—Émard—Verdun
- Laurentides—Labelle
- Laurier—Sainte-Marie
- Laval—Les Îles
- Les Pays-d'en-Haut
- Lévis—Lotbinière
- Longueuil—Charles-LeMoyne—Greenfield Park
- Longueuil—Saint-Hubert
- Louis-Hébert
- Louis-Saint-Laurent—Akiawenhrahk
- Marc-Aurèle-Fortin
- Mégantic—L'Érable—Lotbinière
- Mirabel
- Mont-Saint-Bruno—L’Acadie
- Montcalm
- Montmorency—Charlevoix
- Mount Royal
- Notre-Dame-de-Grâce—Westmount
- Outremont
- Papineau
- Pierre-Boucher—Les Patriotes—Verchères
- Pierrefonds—Dollard
- Pontiac—Kitigan Zibi
- Québec Centre
- Repentigny
- Richmond—Arthabaska—des-Sources
- Rimouski-Neigette—Mitis—Matapédia—Les Basques
- Rivière-des-Mille-Îles
- Rivière-du-Nord
- Rosemont—La Petite-Patrie
- Saint-Augustin—Portneuf—Jacques-Cartier
- Saint-Hyacinthe—Bagot—Acton
- Saint-Jean
- Saint-Laurent
- Saint-Léonard—Saint-Michel
- Saint-Maurice—Champlain
- Shefford
- Sherbrooke
- Terrebonne
- Thérèse-De Blainville
- Trois-Rivières
- Vallée-du-Haut-Saint-Laurent
- Vaudreuil
- Ville-Marie–Le Sud-Ouest–Île-des-Sœurs
- Vimy

== Saskatchewan – 14 seats ==
- Battlefords—Lloydminster—Meadow Lake
- Carlton Trail—Eagle Creek
- Desnethé—Missinippi—Churchill River
- Moose Jaw—Lake Centre—Lanigan
- Prince Albert
- Regina—Lewvan
- Regina—Qu'Appelle
- Regina—Wascana
- Saskatoon East
- Saskatoon South
- Saskatoon West
- Souris—Moose Mountain
- Swift Current—Grasslands—Kindersley
- Yorkton—Melville

== Yukon – 1 seat ==
- Yukon

== See also ==
- Historical federal electoral districts of Canada
- Population of Canadian federal ridings
- Canadian provincial electoral districts
- 2012 Canadian federal electoral redistribution
- 2022 Canadian federal electoral redistribution

Preceded by Electoral districts 2013–2023	Past Canadian electoral districts	Succeeded by TBD
