= Kelowna-Lake Country (provincial electoral district) =

Defunct provincial electoral district in British Columbia, Canada

British Columbia electoral district
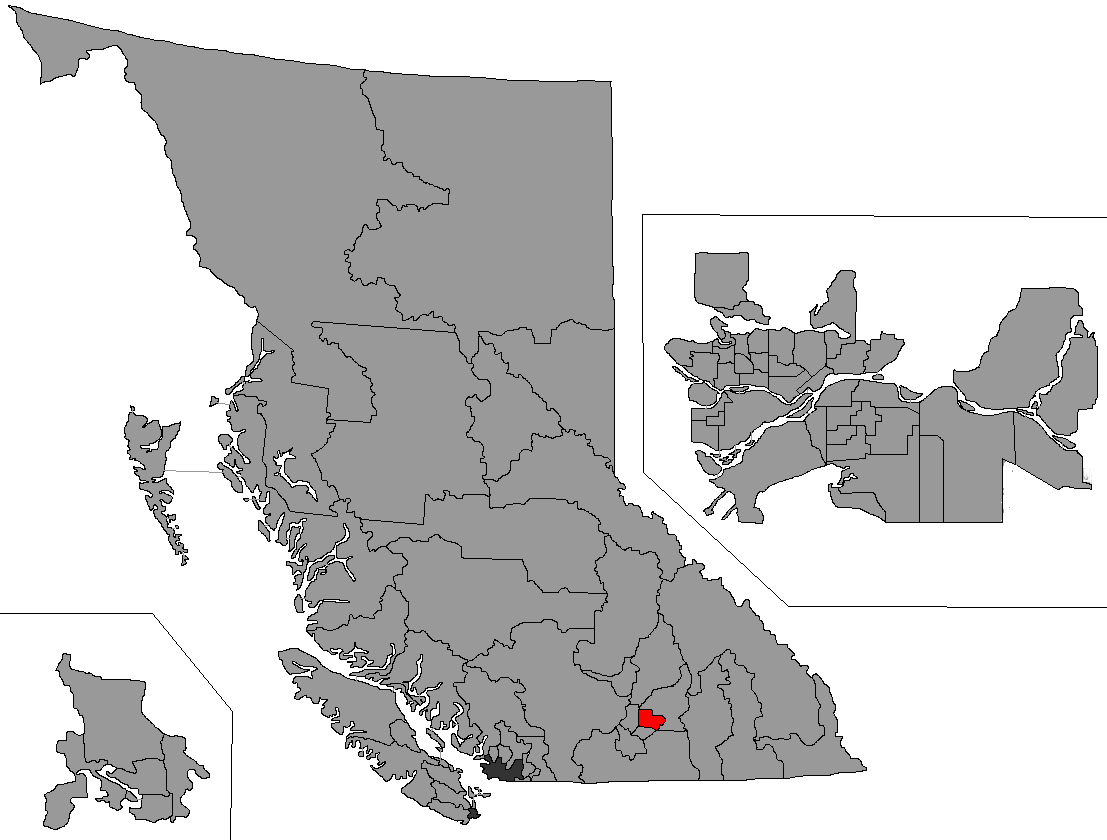

Provincial electoral district
- Legislature: Legislative Assembly of British Columbia
- First contested: 2001
- Last contested: 2020

Demographics
- Population (2001): 56,166
- Area (km²): 1,408
- Census division: Regional District of Central Okanagan
- Census subdivision: Kelowna

Kelowna-Lake Country is a former provincial electoral district for the Legislative Assembly of British Columbia, Canada, in use from 2001 to 2024.

Under the 2021 redistribution that took effect for the 2024 election, the electoral districts in the Kelowna area were substantially redrawn. A significant number of the riding's residents shifted into the new district of Kelowna Centre, while the balance joined with the community of Coldstream in the new district of Kelowna-Lake Country-Coldstream.

== Demographics ==
Population, 2001	56,166
Population change, 1996–2001	9.5%
Area (km^{2})	1,408
Population density (people per km^{2})	40

== Geography ==
Until the 2024 provincial election, Kelowna—Lake Country comprised the northeastern portion of the Regional District of Central Okanagan. This included the entire area of the district municipality of Lake Country and the northern area of Kelowna. It was located in southern British Columbia.

== History ==
=== 1999 redistribution ===
Changes from Okanagan East to Kelowna-Lake Country include:

- removal of area south and southeast of Kelowna
- addition of area north of Kelowna

== Members of the Legislative Assembly ==
Assembly	Years	Member	Party
South Okanagan
14th	1916–1920	James William Jones	Conservative
15th	1920–1924	James William Jones	Conservative
16th	1924–1928	James William Jones	Conservative
17th	1928–1933	James William Jones	Conservative
18th	1933–1937	Joseph Allen Harris	Liberal
19th	1937–1941	Cecil Robert Bull	Liberal
20th	1941–1945	William Andrew Cecil Bennett	Conservative
21st	1945–1949	William Andrew Cecil Bennett	Coalition
22nd	1949–1951	William Andrew Cecil Bennett	Coalition
22nd	1951–1952	William Andrew Cecil Bennett	Social Credit
23rd	1952–1953	William Andrew Cecil Bennett	Social Credit
24th	1953–1956	William Andrew Cecil Bennett	Social Credit
25th	1956–1960	William Andrew Cecil Bennett	Social Credit
26th	1960–1963	William Andrew Cecil Bennett	Social Credit
27th	1963–1966	William Andrew Cecil Bennett	Social Credit
28th	1966–1969	William Andrew Cecil Bennett	Social Credit
29th	1969–1972	William Andrew Cecil Bennett	Social Credit
30th	1972–1973	William Andrew Cecil Bennett	Social Credit
30th	1973–1975	William Richards Bennett	Social Credit
31st	1975–1979	William Richards Bennett	Social Credit
Okanagan South
32nd	1979–1983	William Richards Bennett	Social Credit
33rd	1983–1986	William Richards Bennett	Social Credit
Two Member District
34th	1986–1991	Larry Chalmers	Social Credit
34th	1986–1991	Cliff Serwa	Social Credit
Okanagan East
35th	1991–1993	Judi Tyabji	Liberal
35th	1993–1996	Judi Tyabji	Independent
35th	1996	Judi Tyabji	Progressive Democratic Alliance
Kelowna—Lake Country
36th	1996–2001	John Weisbeck	Liberal
37th	2001–2005	John Weisbeck	Liberal
38th	2005–2009	Al Horning	Liberal
39th	2009–2013	Norm Letnick	Liberal
40th	2013–2017	Norm Letnick	Liberal
41st	2017–2020	Norm Letnick	Liberal
42nd	2020–2023	Norm Letnick	Liberal
42nd	2023–2024	Norm Letnick	BC United

== Election results ==
2020 British Columbia general election
Party	Candidate	Votes	%	±%	Expenditures
Liberal	Norm Letnick	14,679	55.73	−4.41	$42,026.78
New Democratic	Justin Kulik	7,121	27.04	+6.38	$977.00
Green	John Janmaat	3,833	14.55	−4.65	$4,490.00
Libertarian	Kyle Geronazzo	515	1.96	–	$0.00
Independent	Silverado Socrates	190	0.72	–	$0.00
Total valid votes		26,338	100.00	–	
Total rejected ballots					
Turnout					
Registered voters					
Source: Elections BC

2017 British Columbia general election
Party	Candidate	Votes	%	±%	Expenditures
Liberal	Norm Letnick	15,287	59.76	+2.98	$55,200
New Democratic	Erik Olesen	5,344	20.89	−3.91	$7,120
Green	Alison Shaw	4,951	19.35	+11.91	$16,300
Total valid votes		25,582	100.00		
Total rejected ballots		149	0.58		
Turnout		25,731	54.21		
Source: Elections BC

2013 British Columbia general election
Party	Candidate	Votes	%
Liberal	Norm Letnick	12,149	56.78
New Democratic	Mike Nuyens	5,306	24.80
Conservative	Graeme James	2,351	10.99
Green	Gary Adams	1,591	7.44
Total valid votes		21,397	100.00
Total rejected ballots		88	0.41
Turnout		21,485	47.71
Source: Elections BC

2009 British Columbia general election
Party	Candidate	Votes	%	Expenditures
Liberal	Norm Letnick	10,281	52.11	$119,561
New Democratic	Matthew Reed	5,250	26.61	$17,764
Conservative	Mary-Ann Graham	2,253	11.42	$21,044
Green	Ryan Fugger	1,375	6.97	$350
Independent	Alan Clarke	571	2.89	$8,830
Total valid votes		19,730	100.00	
Total rejected ballots		89	0.45	
Turnout		19,819	47.25	

2005 British Columbia general election
Party	Candidate	Votes	%	Expenditures
Liberal	Al Horning	12,247	50.37	$51, 907
New Democratic	John Pugsley	7,390	30.40	$18,967
Green	Kevin Ade	2,541	10.45	$4,735
Democratic Reform	Al Clarke	1,793	7.37	$31,253
Marijuana	David Hunter Thomson	341	1.40	$1,002
Total valid votes		24,312	100.00	
Total rejected ballots		147	0.60	
Turnout		24,459	54.88	

2001 British Columbia general election
Party	Candidate	Votes	%	Expenditures
Liberal	John Weisbeck	14,093	63.19	$38,373
New Democratic	Janet Elizabeth Scotland	3,102	13.91	$9,340
Green	Devra Lynn Rice	2,606	11.68	$1,098
Unity	Kevin Wendland	1,496	6.71	$1,493
Marijuana	Paul Halonen	734	3.29	$444
Action	David Thomson	272	1.22	$790
Total valid votes		22,303	100.00	
Total rejected ballots		104	0.47	
Turnout		22,407	66.91	

== See also ==
- List of British Columbia provincial electoral districts
- Canadian provincial electoral districts
