= Imre Szeman =

Canadian academic and writer (born 1968)

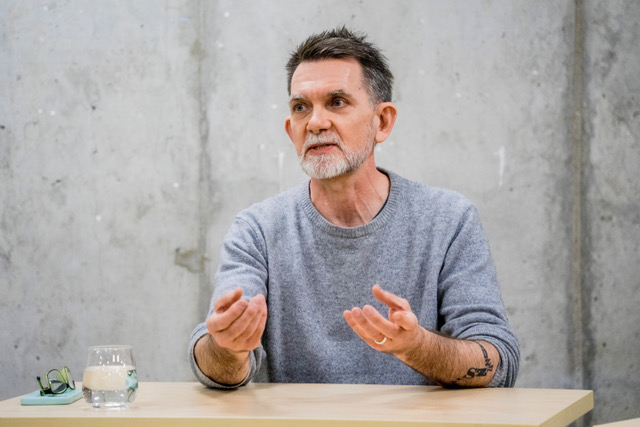
Imre Szeman in January 2023

Imre Szeman (born 26 July 1968) is a Canadian cultural theorist, professor, and public intellectual. He is Director of the Institute for Environment, Conservation, and Sustainability and Professor of Human Geography at the University of Toronto Scarborough. Szeman was previously University Research Chair of Environmental Communication at the University of Waterloo (2017–2022), Canada Research Chair of Cultural Studies at the University of Alberta (2009–2016), and Senator William McMaster Chair in Globalization and Cultural Studies at McMaster University. In 2020, Szeman was named as a Fellow of the Royal Society of Canada. In 2022, he was the Leverhulme Visiting professor in Critical Studies at the University of Glasgow. From 2021 to 2022, Szeman served as the Climate Critic for the Green Party of Canada. In 2024, he became the Critic for Electoral Reform in the Green Party's Shadow Cabinet but resigned from the party in early 2025.

== Career ==
Szeman received his B.A. from Queen's University in 1990 and his M.A. from the University of Western Ontario in 1993. He began doctoral studies under Fredric Jameson at Duke University in 1993, where he completed a Ph.D. in literature in 1998.

Szeman has made contributions to debates in critical theory and cultural studies, as well as globalization, postcolonial, and Canadian studies. His early work explored the relationship between national identity and global modernity in postcolonial literature and the impact of globalization on contemporary political thought.

Szeman is best known for his foundational contributions to the emerging field of “energy humanities,” which applies theories and methods from the humanities to problems of energy production, consumption, and transition. The starting point for this work, and for the analysis of “petroculture,” is Szeman’s question: “What if oil is fundamental to the societies we have now?” Szeman’s work has dealt with the problem of the representation of oil and energy, the ways in which forms of energy shape cultural forms, expectations, and values, and role of the humanities in discussions of climate change and energy transition. He is an editor of Energy Humanities.

Szeman has authored, edited, or co-edited 23 books, as well as numerous journal and magazine articles, book chapters, and special journal issues. Szeman founded the Canadian Association of Cultural Studies and co-founded the U.S. Cultural Studies Association, Banff Research in Culture, and the Petrocultures Research Group. He has received the John Polanyi Prize in Literature (2000), the Alexander von Humboldt-Foundation Fellowship (2005), a Killiam Annual Professorship (2013), the J. Gordin Kaplan Award for Excellence in Research (2015), and the Arts Award for Excellence in Research (U Waterloo).

== Publications ==
=== Books ===
- Zones of Instability: Literature, Postcolonialism, and the Nation (Johns Hopkins University Press, 2003)
- After Globalization (with Eric Cazdyn) (Wiley-Blackwell, 2011)
- Popular Culture: A User’s Guide, 4 Editions (with Susie O’Brien) (Wiley-Blackwell, 2004–2017)
- After Oil. (West Virginia University Press, 2016).
- On Petrocultures: Globalization, Culture, Energy (West Virginia University Press, 2019)
- Futures of the Sun: The Struggle Over Renewable Life (University of Minnesota Press, 2024)

=== Selected journal articles ===
- "The Persistence of the Nation: Interdisciplinarity and Canadian Literary Criticism." Essays on Canadian Writing 65 (Fall 1998): 16–37.
- "The Rhetoric of Culture: Some Notes on Magazines, Canadian Culture and Globalization.” Journal of Canadian Studies 35.3 (2000): 212–230.
- "Who’s Afraid of National Allegory? Jameson, Literary Criticism, Globalization." South Atlantic Quarterly 100.3 (2001): 801–25.
- “System Failure: Oil, Futurity and the Anticipation of Disaster." South Atlantic Quarterly 106.4 (2007): 805–823.
- “How to Know About Oil: Energy Epistemologies and Political Futures.” Journal of Canadian Studies 47.3 (2013): 145–168.
- “Crude Aesthetics: The Politics of Oil Documentaries.” Journal of American Studies 46.2 (2012): 423–439.
- “Entrepreneurship as the New Common Sense.” South Atlantic Quarterly 114.3 (2015): 471–490.
- “Conjectures on World Energy Literature.” Journal of Postcolonial Writing 53.2 (2017): 1–12.
- “Solarity” (with Darin Barney). South Atlantic Quarterly 120.1 (2021): 1–11.
- “Quitting (the) Habit: Fossil Fuels, Governmentality and the Politics of Energy Dependency.” new formations 103 (2021): 63–77.
- “What Do We Talk About When We Talk About Extractivism?” (with Jennifer Wenzel). Textual Practice 35.3 (2021): 505–523.

=== Selected edited collections ===
- Pierre Bourdieu: Fieldwork in Culture (with Nicholas Brown) (Rowman & Littlefield, 2000)
- The Johns Hopkins Guide to Literary Theory and Criticism (with Michael Groden and Martin Kreiswirth) (Johns Hopkins University Press, 2005).
- Canadian Cultural Studies: A Reader (with Sourayan Mookerjea and Gail Faurschou) (Duke University Press, 2009)
- Cultural Theory: An Anthology (with Tim Kaposy) (Wiley-Blackwell, 2010)
- Energy Humanities: An Anthology (with Dominic Boyer) (Johns Hopkins University Press, 2017)
- A Companion to Critical and Cultural Theory with Sarah Blacker and Justin Sully) (Wiley-Blackwell, 2017)
- Fueling Culture: 101 Words for Energy and Environment (with Jennifer Wenzel and Patricia Yaeger) (Fordham University Press, 2017)
- Petrocultures: Oil, Politics, Culture (with Sheena Wilson and Adam Carlson) (McGill-Queen’s University Press, 2017)
- Power Shift: Keywords for a New Politics of Energy (with Jennifer Wenzel) (West Virginia University Press, 2025)
