= Werner Schmidt =

Canadian politician (1932–2024)

Leader of the Alberta Social Credit Party
- In office 1973–1975
- Preceded by: James Douglas Henderson (acting)
- Succeeded by: Robert Curtis Clark

Member of Parliament for Kelowna (Okanagan Centre; 1993–1997)
- In office October 25, 1993 – January 23, 2006
- Preceded by: Al Horning
- Succeeded by: Ron Cannan

Personal details
- Born: January 18, 1932 Coaldale, Alberta, Canada
- Died: March 29, 2024 (aged 92) Edmonton, Alberta, Canada
- Party: Conservative (from 2004)
- Other political affiliations: Reform (1993–2004); Alberta Social Credit Party (1973–1975)

Werner George Schmidt (January 18, 1932 – March 29, 2024) was a Canadian politician, teacher, and school principal.

== Political career ==
Schmidt was vice-president of Lethbridge Community College when he was chosen to succeed Harry Strom as leader of the Alberta Social Credit Party following the defeat of Strom's government in 1971 despite the fact that Schmidt had never held a seat in the Alberta legislature. Schmidt defeated former Highways Minister Gordon Taylor and former Education Minister Robert Curtis Clark in an upset victory at the 1973 Alberta Social Credit leadership convention. After his leadership election, Schmidt ran in the electoral district of Calgary-Foothills in a by-election held on June 25, 1973, but was defeated by Stewart McCrae.

Under his leadership, the party won only four seats in the 1975 provincial election and Schmidt, failing to win his own seat, returned to private life.

Schmidt left Alberta and moved to British Columbia joining the Reform Party of Canada at its inception and was a member of its first Executive Council. He was an unsuccessful candidate in the 1988 federal election before winning a seat in the 1993 election representing Okanagan Centre. He was re-elected in 1997 representing Kelowna. He won election again in 2000 as a Canadian Alliance MP with 60% of the vote and won his fourth straight victory in the 2004, this time as a Conservative.

As a member of Parliament, Schmidt served as Critic for Industry, Critic for Public Works and Government Services and Critic for Seniors. He has also been a member of several Standing Committees including the Standing Committee on Industry, the Standing Committee on Finance, and the Standing Committee on Procedure and House Affairs.

He served as Caucus Chair of the Canadian Alliance and Caucus Vice Chair when the party became the Conservative Party of Canada.

Schmidt retired from politics with the dissolution of parliament for the 2006 federal election. He died in Edmonton on March 29, 2024, at the age of 92.

== Electoral history ==
2004 Canadian federal election: Kelowna
Party	Candidate	Votes	%	±%	Expenditures
Conservative	Werner Schmidt	25,553	48.00	–19.75	$60,102.04
Liberal	Vern Nielson	14,109	26.50	+2.64	$55,532.88
New Democratic	Starleigh Grass	8,954	16.82	+10.54	$14,000.99
Green	Kevin Ade	3,903	7.33	–	$4,993.86
Marijuana	Huguette Plourde	447	0.84	–	none listed
Canadian Action	Michael Cassidyne-Hook	271	0.51	–1.60	none listed
Total valid votes/expense limit		53,237	99.70	–	$81,764.67
Total rejected ballots		159	0.30	–0.09	
Turnout		53,396	62.14	–1.88	
Eligible voters		85,932			
Conservative hold		Swing		–9.88	
Source: Elections Canada

2000 Canadian federal election: Kelowna
Party	Candidate	Votes	%	±%	Expenditures
Alliance	Werner Schmidt	33,810	59.47	+9.46	$44,990
Liberal	Joe Leask	13,564	23.86	+1.46	$46,876
Progressive Conservative	Doug Mallo	4,708	8.28	–8.51	$9,791
New Democratic	John O. Powell	3,572	6.28	–1.32	$9,493
Canadian Action	Jack William Peach	1,199	2.11	–	$3,652
Total valid votes		56,853	99.61		
Total rejected ballots		223	0.39	+0.15	
Turnout		57,076	64.02	+1.21	
Eligible voters		89,153			
Alliance hold		Swing		+3.50	
Source: Elections Canada

1997 Canadian federal election: Kelowna
Party	Candidate	Votes	%	Expenditures
Reform	Werner Schmidt	25,246	50.01	$48,355
Liberal	Janna Francis	11,306	22.40	$32,838
Progressive Conservative	Al Horning	8,477	16.79	$47,498
New Democratic	Fred Steele	3,838	7.60	$11,443
Green	David Hughes	1,612	3.19	$1,014
Total valid votes		50,479	99.76	
Total rejected ballots		123	0.24	
Turnout		50,602	62.81	
Eligible voters		80,568		
Source: Elections Canada
