= Okanagan Lake West—South Kelowna =

Federal electoral district in British Columbia, Canada

British Columbia electoral district
- Interactive map of riding boundaries from the 2025 federal election

Federal electoral district
- Legislature: House of Commons
MP
Dan Albas
Conservative
- District created: 2023
- First contested: 2025
- Last contested: 2025
- District webpage: profile, map

Demographics
- Population (2021): 106,794
- Electors (2025): 88,663
- Area (km²): 1,915
- Pop. density (per km²): 55.8
- Census division(s): Central Okanagan, Okanagan-Similkameen
- Census subdivision(s): Kelowna (part), West Kelowna, Summerland, Tsinstikeptum, Peachland, Tsinstikeptum

Okanagan Lake West—South Kelowna (French: Okanagan Lake-Ouest—Kelowna-Sud) is a federal electoral district in British Columbia, Canada. It came into effect upon the call of the 2025 Canadian federal election.

== Geography ==
Under the 2022 Canadian federal electoral redistribution the riding will be created out of Kelowna—Lake Country and Central Okanagan—Similkameen—Nicola.

It will consist of the southern third of Kelowna, plus the municipalities of Peachland, Summerland and West Kelowna, the Indian Reserves of Tsinstikeptum 9 and Tsinstikeptum 10, most of the Central Okanagan West regional district electoral area (excluding the Fintry area) and most of the Okanagan-Similkameen F regional district area (excluding the area south of Summerland).

== Demographics ==
According to the 2021 Canadian census

Languages: 88.2% English, 2.1% German, 1.9% French

Religions: 55.4% No religion, 41.2% Christian (12.8% Catholic, 4.4% United Church, 3.8% Anglican, 2.0% Baptist, 1.9% Lutheran, 16.3% Other),

Median income: $42,800 (2020)

Average income: $57,900 (2020)

Panethnic groups in Okanagan Lake West—South Kelowna (2021)
Panethnic group	2021	
Panethnic group	Pop.	%
European (Note: Statistic includes all persons that did not make up part of a visible minority or an indigenous identity.)	90,605	85.88%
Indigenous	6,200	5.49%
East Asian (Note: Statistic includes total responses of "Chinese", "Korean", and "Japanese" under visible minority section on census.)	2,730	2.59%
South Asian	1,935	1.83%
Southeast Asian (Note: Statistic includes total responses of "Filipino" and "Southeast Asian" under visible minority section on census.)	1,220	1.16%
African	890	0.84%
Latin American	750	0.71%
Middle Eastern (Note: Statistic includes total responses of "West Asian" and "Arab" under visible minority section on census.)	490	0.46%
Other/multiracial (Note: Statistic includes total responses of "Visible minority, n.i.e." and "Multiple visible minorities" under visible minority section on census.)	540	0.51%
Total responses	105,500	98.79%
Total population	106,795	100%
Notes: Totals greater than 100% due to multiple origin responses. Demographics based on 2022 Canadian federal electoral redistribution riding boundaries.

== History ==
Parliament	Years	Member	Party
Okanagan Lake West—South Kelowna; Riding created from Central Okanagan—Similkameen—Nicola and Kelowna—Lake Country
45th	2025–present	Dan Albas	Conservative

== Electoral results ==
2025 Canadian federal election
Party	Candidate	Votes	%	±%	Expenditures
Conservative	Dan Albas	33,219	50.92	+2.57	$76,604.00
Liberal	Juliette Sicotte	28,827	44.19	+20.97	$44,087.00
New Democratic	Harpreet Badohal	2,189	3.36	–15.53	$20,508.97
Green	Louise Lecouffe	602	0.92	–1.83	none listed
People's	Debbie Robinson	307	0.47	–6.32	none listed
Canadian Future	Gary Suddard	90	0.14	–	none listed
Total valid votes/expense limit		65,234	99.42	–	$135,076.06
Total rejected ballots		382	0.58	–	
Turnout		65,616	72.83	–	
Eligible voters		90,095			
Conservative notional hold		Swing		–9.20	
Source: Elections Canada

2021 federal election redistributed results
Party	Vote	%
Conservative	27,129	48.35
Liberal	13,028	23.22
New Democratic	10,598	18.89
People's	3,812	6.79
Green	1,541	2.75
