= 2012 Canadian federal electoral redistribution =

Redistribution of Canadian electoral ridings

The federal electoral redistribution of 2012 was a redistribution of electoral districts (also known as ridings in Canadian English) in Canada following the results of the 2011 Canadian census. As a result of amendments to the Constitution Act, 1867, the number of seats in the House of Commons of Canada increased from 308 to 338. The previous electoral redistribution was in 2003.

The redistribution was implemented by proclamation under the Electoral Boundaries Readjustment Act on October 5, 2013, and came into effect upon the dissolution of the 41st Canadian Parliament on August 2, 2015. The resulting electoral districts and boundaries were used in the 2015, the 2019, and the 2021 federal elections.

Federal electoral districts were next redistributed in 2022, which came into effect upon the dissolution of the 44th Canadian Parliament on March 23, 2025.

== Background and previous attempts at reform ==
Prior to 2012, the redistribution rules for increasing the number of seats in the House of Commons of Canada was governed by section 51 of the Constitution Act, 1867, as last amended in 1985. As early as 2007, attempts were made to reform the calculation of how that number was determined, as the 1985 formula did not fully take into account the rapid population growth being experienced in the provinces of Alberta, British Columbia and Ontario.

The revised formula, as originally presented, was estimated to have the following impact:

Allocation of seats in the House of Commons (2010 proposal)
Province/territory	Current seats	Projected seats after the 2011 census	
Province/territory	Current seats	Under the 1985 formula	Under the new formula
British Columbia	36	38	43
Alberta	28	29	33
Saskatchewan	14	14	14
Manitoba	14	14	14
Ontario	106	110	124
Quebec	75	75	75
New Brunswick	10	10	10
Nova Scotia	11	11	11
Prince Edward Island	4	4	4
Newfoundland and Labrador	7	7	7
Yukon	1	1	1
Northwest Territories	1	1	1
Nunavut	1	1	1
Total	308	315	338

Three successive bills were presented by the Government of Canada before its final form was passed by the House of Commons and Senate in 2011.

== Passage of the Fair Representation Act (2011) ==
The expansion of the House from 308 seats to 338 seats was pursuant to the Fair Representation Act, which came into force on December 16, 2011. In introducing the bill, the government's stated aims were:

1. allocating more seats to better reflect population grown in Ontario, British Columbia, and Alberta;
2. maintaining the number of seats for slower-growing provinces; and
3. maintaining the proportional representation of Quebec according to population.

The act replaced s. 51(1) of the Constitution Act, 1867 with the following formula:

1. Divide the estimated population of a province by a determined electoral quotient (initially set at 111,166).
2. If the number of members determined is less than what a province had in 1985, increase its seat count to that number (the "grandfather clause").
3. If a province's population was overrepresented in the House of Commons at the completion of the last redistribution process, and would now be under-represented based on the calculations above, give it extra seats so that its share of House of Commons seats is proportional to its share of the population (the "representation rule").
4. Add one seat for each of the territories.

The 1985 minimum has two components:

1. No province can have fewer members of Parliament than it has senators (the "senatorial clause").
2. Otherwise, the calculation determined in 1985 under the Constitution Act, 1985 (Representation) will govern the amount.

Allocation of seats in the House of Commons (electoral quotient of 111,166)
Province/territory	July 1, 2011 population estimate	Initial seat allocation	Senatorial clause	Grandfather clause	Representation rule	Total seats
British Columbia	4,573,321	42	–	–	–	42
Alberta	3,779,353	34	–	–	–	34
Saskatchewan	1,057,884	10	–	4	–	14
Manitoba	1,250,574	12	–	2	–	14
Ontario	13,372,996	121	–	–	–	121
Quebec	7,979,663	72	–	3	3	78
New Brunswick	755,455	7	3	–	–	10
Nova Scotia	945,437	9	1	1	–	11
Prince Edward Island	145,855	2	2	–	–	4
Newfoundland and Labrador	510,578	5	1	1	–	7
Yukon	34,666	n/a				1
Northwest Territories	43,675	n/a				1
Nunavut	33,322	n/a				1
Total	34,482,779					338

The addition of three seats in Quebec marked the first time since the adoption of the 1985 electoral redistribution formula that any province besides Ontario, Alberta and British Columbia gained new seats.

== Process of redistribution ==
The allocation of seats to the provinces and territories was based on rules in the Constitution of Canada as well as population estimates made by Statistics Canada based on the 2006 Canadian census (in particular, the allocation is based on an estimate for the population as of July 1, 2011, "based on 2006 Census population counts adjusted for census net undercoverage and incompletely enumerated Indian reserves").

A final report was tabled October 2013, with the changes proclaimed to take effect as of the first dissolution of Parliament occurring after May 1, 2014. The names of some ridings were changed when the Riding Name Change Act, 2014 came into force on June 19, 2014.

In a report issued in 2014, Elections Canada noted: "While some administrative tasks remained to be done after that point, Elections Canada's role of supporting the federal electoral boundaries commissions, which had worked for up to 18 months in their respective provinces, was complete." The report concluded that "the process for the 2012 redistribution of federal electoral boundaries was a success".

== Effect of 2013 representation orders ==
Effect of 2012 redistribution (by province/territory)
Status	BC	AB	SK	MB	ON	QC	NB	NS	PE	NL	YT	NT	NU	Total
New seats	6	7			15	3								31
Merged seat		1												1
No change in riding boundary	2			2	20	9		3	4	1	1	1	1	44
Redistributed – change in party ranking	3		2	1	2	2				1				11
Redistributed – no change of party	31	26	12	11	84	64	10	8		5				251
Total	42	34	14	14	121	78	10	11	4	7	1	1	1	338

Effect of 2012 redistribution on notional number of seats held
Party	2011 (election)	New seats	Merged seat	Adjt +	Adjt -	2011 (redistributed)
Liberal	34	2		2	(2)	36
Conservative	166	23	(1)	4	(4)	188
New Democratic	103	6		4	(4)	109
Bloc Québécois	4			1	(1)	4
Green	1					1
Total	308	31	(1)	11	(11)	338

Notional seats by party by province
Party	BC	AB	SK	MB	ON	QC	NB	PE	NS	NL	Territories	Total
Conservative	28	33	11	11	83	5	8	1	4	2	2	188
New Democratic	11	1	2	3	24	61	1		3	2	1	109
Liberal	2		1		14	8	1	3	4	3		36
Bloc Québécois						4						4
Green	1											1
Total	42	34	14	14	121	78	10	4	11	7	3	338

Compared to the House of Commons seat allocation in effect for the 41st Canadian Parliament (which convened in 2011), the changes were as follows:

Redistribution by province and territory
Province	Seats	±	Initial report	Final report
Alberta	34	6	Banff—Airdrie: Created mostly out of the southern portion of Wild Rose and a small part of Macleod south of Cochrane. Contains the Highway corridor west of Calgary to the B.C. border as well as Calgary's northern exurbs.; Battle River: Created out of the southern half of Vegreville—Wainwright and the northern half of Crowfoot and a small part of the eastern part of Red Deer. Contains much of rural Central Eastern Alberta. Named for the Battle River which flows through it.; Bow River: Created out of the eastern half of Macleod, the northwestern corner of Medicine Hat and the southwestern quadrannt of Crowfoot. Contains the Highway 1 corridor east of Calgary past Brooks. The riding also includes Vulcan and the Highway 2 corridor roughly between Nanton and Fort Macleod. Named for the Bow River which flows through it.; Calgary Centre: This riding shifts eastward, moving the western boundary to 37 St SW and moving the eastern boundary to the Bow River.; Calgary Confederation: Created mostly from Calgary Centre-North, except losing the area north of McKnight Blvd and John Laurie Blvd. It also takes in the part of Calgary West north of the Bow River and east of Nose Hill Drive and Stony Trail. Named for Confederation Park.; Calgary Forest Lawn: Created mostly from parts of Calgary Northeast and Calgary Southeast and newly annexed territory of the City of Calgary that is now in the riding of Crowfoot. The riding takes in the part of Calgary Northeast south of a line following McKnight Blvd to Falconbridge Blvd to 32nd Ave and takes in the part of Calgary Southeast north of a line following the Bow River to 32 Ave SE to the CNR to 17 Ave SE. Riding named for the neighbourhood of Forest Lawn.; Calgary Heritage: Created mostly out of Calgary Southwest, except a few small parts of Calgary Southeast caused by adjusting the eastern boundary of the riding to follow Macleod Trail. The southern boundary of the riding is also adjusted compared to Calgary Southwest, as it would follow 24 St SW to Spruce Meadows Trail to James McKevitt Rd. The riding is likely named for Heritage Park.; Calgary McCall: Created almost entirely out of Calgary Northeast except for newly annexed territory of the City of Calgary now in the riding of Wild Rose. The riding would contain all of Calgary Northeast not in the proposed riding of Calgary Forest Lawn. The riding is likely named after the McCall Industrial Park or the provincial riding of the same name.; Calgary Midnapore: Created mostly out of Calgary Southeast but also contains parts of Calgary Southwest, Calgary East and newly annexed territory by the city of Calgary in the current riding of Macleod. The riding follows the Bow River to Glenmore Trail to Macleod Trail to James McKevitt Rd. The riding is named after the Midnapore neighbourhood.; Calgary Nose Hill: Apart from losing the emdash in the riding name, this riding loses all of its territory north of Stoney Trail and west of Sacree Trail and John Laurie Blvd. However, the riding also gains some territory from Calgary Centre-North. This is the area north of a line following John Laurie Blvd to McKnight Blvd. The riding name most likely comes from Nose Hill Park.; Calgary Shepard: This riding is created out of parts of Calgary East and Calgary Southeast as well as newly annexed parts of the city of Calgary now in Crowfoot. The riding would be bounded on the west by the Bow River and on the north by a line following 26 Ave SE to the CNR to 17 Ave SE. The riding is named after the former hamlet of Shepard, which was annexed by Calgary in 2007.; Calgary Signal Hill: This riding is mostly created out of Calgary West, except for newly annexed parts of the City of Calgary now in Macleod and that part of Calgary Centre west of 37 Ave SW. The riding would contain all of Calgary Southwest south the Bow River. The riding is named after the neighbourhood of the same name.; Calgary Rocky Ridge: This riding is created mostly out of Calgary—Nose Hill except for some new areas contained in newly annexed territories of the City of Calgary now in Wild Rose and the part of Calgary West not contained in Calgary Signal Hill or Calgary Confederation. The riding would consist of all of Calgary—Nose Hill not in the new riding of Calgary Nose Hill. The riding name comes from the neighbourhood of Rocky Ridge.; Edmonton Callingwood; Edmonton Griesbach; Edmonton Manning; Edmonton McDougall; Edmonton Mill Woods; Edmonton Riverbend; Edmonton Strathcona; Edmonton—Wetaskiwin; Foothills; Fort McMurray—Athabasca; Grande Prairie; Lakeland; Lethbridge; Medicine Hat; Peace River—Westlock; Red Deer—Mountain View; Red Deer—Wolf Creek; Sherwood Park—Fort Saskatchewan; St. Albert—Edmonton; Sturgeon River; Yellowhead	Banff—Airdrie; Battle River—Crowfoot; Bow River; Calgary Centre; Calgary Confederation; Calgary Forest Lawn; Calgary Heritage; Calgary Midnapore; Calgary Nose Hill; Calgary Rocky Ridge; Calgary Shepard; Calgary Signal Hill; Calgary Skyview; Edmonton Centre; Edmonton Griesbach; Edmonton Manning; Edmonton Mill Woods; Edmonton Riverbend; Edmonton Strathcona; Edmonton West; Edmonton—Wetaskiwin; Foothills; Fort McMurray—Cold Lake; Grande Prairie-Mackenzie* (initially Grande Prairie); Lakeland; Lethbridge; Medicine Hat—Cardston—Warner* (initially Medicine Hat); Peace River—Westlock; Red Deer—Lacombe* (initially Red Deer—Wolf Creek); Red Deer—Mountain View; Sherwood Park—Fort Saskatchewan; St. Albert—Edmonton; Sturgeon River—Parkland* (initially Sturgeon River); Yellowhead
British Columbia	42	6	Abbotsford—Sumas; Burnaby North—Seymour; Burnaby South—Deer Lake; Cariboo—Prince George; Central Okanagan—Coquihalla; Chilliwack—Fraser Canyon; Coquitlam—Port Coquitlam; Delta; Esquimalt—Colwood; Fort Langley—Aldergrove; Kamloops—Thompson—Cariboo; Kelowna—Lake Country; Kootenay—Columbia; Langley—Cloverdale; Mission—Matsqui; Nanaimo—Alberni; Nanaimo—Cowichan; New Westminster—Burnaby East; North Okanagan—Shuswap; North Surrey—Guildford; North Vancouver; Pitt Meadows—Maple Ridge; Port Moody—Coquitlam; Prince George—Peace River; Richmond East; Richmond West; Saanich—Gulf Islands; Skeena—Bulkley Valley; South Cowichan—Juan de Fuca; South Okanagan—West Kootenay; South Surrey—White Rock; Surrey Centre; Vancouver Centre; Vancouver East; Vancouver Granville; Vancouver Island North; Vancouver Kingsway; Vancouver Quadra; Vancouver South; Victoria; West Surrey—Whalley; West Vancouver—Sunshine Coast—Sea to Sky Country	Abbotsford; Burnaby North—Seymour; Burnaby South; Cariboo—Prince George; Central Okanagan—Similkameen—Nicola; Chilliwack—Hope; Cloverdale—Langley City; Coquitlam—Port Coquitlam; Courtenay—Alberni; Cowichan—Malahat—Langford; Delta; Esquimalt—Saanich—Sooke* (initially Saanich—Esquimalt—Juan de Fuca); Fleetwood—Port Kells; Kamloops—Thompson—Cariboo; Kelowna—Lake Country; Kootenay—Columbia; Langley—Aldergrove; Mission—Matsqui—Fraser Canyon; Nanaimo—Ladysmith; New Westminster—Burnaby; North Island—Powell River* (initially Vancouver Island North—Comox—Powell River); North Okanagan—Shuswap; North Vancouver; Pitt Meadows—Maple Ridge; Port Moody—Coquitlam; Prince George—Peace River—Northern Rockies; Richmond Centre; Saanich—Gulf Islands; Skeena—Bulkley Valley; South Okanagan—West Kootenay; South Surrey—White Rock; Steveston—Richmond East; Surrey Centre; Surrey—Newton; Vancouver Centre; Vancouver East; Vancouver Granville; Vancouver Kingsway; Vancouver Quadra; Vancouver South; Victoria; West Vancouver—Sunshine Coast—Sea to Sky Country
Manitoba	14		Brandon—Souris; Charleswood—St. James—Assiniboia; Churchill—Keewatinook Aski; Dauphin—Swan River—Neepawa; Elmwood—Transcona; Kildonan—St. Paul; Portage—Lisgar; Provencher; Saint Boniface; Selkirk—Interlake; Winnipeg Centre; Winnipeg North; Winnipeg South; Winnipeg South Centre	Brandon—Souris; Charleswood—St. James—Assiniboia—Headingley; Churchill—Keewatinook Aski; Dauphin—Swan River—Neepawa; Elmwood—Transcona; Kildonan—St. Paul; Portage—Lisgar; Provencher; Saint Boniface—Saint Vital; Selkirk—Interlake—Eastman; Winnipeg Centre; Winnipeg North; Winnipeg South; Winnipeg South Centre
New Brunswick	10		Acadie—Bathurst; Beauséjour—Dieppe; Fredericton; Fundy—Quispamsis; Madawaska—Restigouche; Miramichi; Moncton—Riverview; New Brunswick Southwest; Saint John; Tobique—Saint John River Valley	Acadie—Bathurst; Beauséjour; Fredericton; Fundy Royal; Madawaska—Restigouche; Miramichi—Grand Lake; Moncton—Riverview—Dieppe; New Brunswick Southwest; Saint John—Rothesay; Tobique—Mactaquac
Newfoundland and Labrador			Avalon - gains the rest of Conception Bay South, part of Paradise, while loses the Trinity Bay area from the current district.; Bay d'Espoir–Central–Notre Dame - new; includes central Newfoundland; Bonavista–Burin–Trinity - new; Includes the area around Bonavista and Trinity Bays, as well as the Burin Peninsula.; Labrador - no changes; Long Range Mountains - new; Includes the west coast of the Island of Newfoundland; St. John's North - Smaller version of St. John's East, losing all of Conception Bay South and part of Paradise.; St. John's South—Mount Pearl - no changes	Avalon; Bonavista—Burin—Trinity; Coast of Bays—Central—Notre Dame; Labrador; Long Range Mountains; St. John's East; St. John's South—Mount Pearl
Northwest Territories	1		A commission was not required for the Northwest Territories since the territory is a single electoral district and under an amendment to the Electoral Boundaries Readjustment Act, it used the name Northwest Territories again, instead of Western Arctic.	
Nova Scotia	11		Cape Breton—Canso; Central Nova; Cumberland—Colchester; Dartmouth—Cole Harbour; Halifax; Halifax West; Kings—Hants; Sackville—Porters Lake; South Shore—St. Margarets; Sydney—Victoria; West Nova	Cape Breton—Canso; Central Nova; Cumberland—Colchester; Dartmouth—Cole Harbour; Halifax; Halifax West; Kings—Hants; Sackville—Preston—Chezzetcook; South Shore—St. Margarets; Sydney—Victoria; West Nova
Nunavut	1		A commission was not required for Nunavut since the territory is a single electoral district.	
Ontario	121	15	Ajax; Algoma—Manitoulin—Killarney; Ancaster; Aurora—Richmond Hill; Barrie North; Barrie South; Beaches—East York; Belleville—Napanee—Frontenac; Brampton Centre; Brampton—Gore; Brampton North; Brampton South; Brampton West; Brant; Bruce—Grey—Owen Sound; Burlington; Cambridge; Carleton—Kanata; Chatham-Kent; Davenport; Don Valley East; Don Valley North; Dufferin—Caledon; Eglinton—Lawrence; Elgin—Middlesex—London; Essex; Etobicoke Centre; Etobicoke—Lakeshore; Etobicoke North; Glengarry—Prescott—Russell; Guelph; Haldiman—Norfolk; Haliburton—Uxbridge; Halton; Hamilton Centre; Hamilton East—Stoney Creek; Hamilton Mountain; Huron—Bruce; Kawartha Lakes—Port Hope—Cobourg; Kenora; Kingston and the Islands; Kitchener Centre; Kitchener—Conestoga; Kitchener South—North Dumfries—Brant; Lambton—Kent—Middlesex; Lanark—Frontenac—Hastings; Leeds—Grenville; London—Fanshawe; London North Centre; London West; Markham; Markham—Stouffville; Markham—Unionville; Milton; Mississauga Centre; Mississauga East—Cooksville; Mississauga—Erin Mills; Mississauga North; Mississauga South; Mississauga West—Streetsville; Mount Pleasant; Nepean; Nepean—Carleton; Newmarket—Aurora; Niagara Falls; Niagara West; Nickel Belt—Timiskaming; Nipissing; Oak Ridges; Oakville; Oshawa—Bowmanville; Oshawa—Durham; Ottawa Centre; Ottawa—Orléans; Ottawa South; Ottawa—Vanier; Ottawa West—Nepean; Oxford; Parkdale—High Park; Parry Sound—Muskoka; Perth—Wellington; Peterborough; Pickering—Brooklin; Prince Edward—Quinte West; Renfrew—Pembroke; Richmond Hill; St. Catharines; St. Paul's; Sarnia—Lambton; Sault Ste. Marie; Scarborough—Agincourt; Scarborough Centre; Scarborough East; Scarborough—Guildwood; Scarborough North; Scarborough Southwest; Simcoe—Grey; Simcoe North; Stormont—Dundas—South Glengarry; Sudbury; Thunder Bay—Rainy River; Thunder Bay—Superior North; Timmins—Cochrane—James Bay; Toronto Centre; Toronto—Danforth; Toronto North; Trinity—Spadina; Vaughan—Thornhill; Vaughan—Woodbridge; Waterdown—Glanbrook; Waterloo; Welland—Fort Erie; Wellington—Halton Hills; Whitby; Willowdale; Windsor—Tecumseh; Windsor West; York Centre; York—Simcoe; York South—Weston; York West	Ajax; Algoma—Manitoulin—Kapuskasing; Aurora—Oak Ridges—Richmond Hill; Barrie—Innisfil; Barrie—Springwater—Oro-Medonte; Bay of Quinte; Beaches—East York; Brampton Centre; Brampton East; Brampton North; Brampton South; Brampton West; Brantford—Brant* (initially Brant); Bruce—Grey—Owen Sound; Burlington; Cambridge; Carleton* (initially Rideau—Carleton); Chatham-Kent—Leamington; Davenport; Don Valley East; Don Valley North; Don Valley West; Dufferin—Caledon; Durham; Eglinton—Lawrence; Elgin—Middlesex—London; Essex; Etobicoke Centre; Etobicoke—Lakeshore; Etobicoke North; Flamborough—Glanbrook; Glengarry—Prescott—Russell; Guelph; Haldimand—Norfolk; Haliburton—Kawartha Lakes—Brock; Hamilton Centre; Hamilton East—Stoney Creek; Hamilton Mountain; Hamilton West—Ancaster—Dundas; Hastings—Lennox and Addington; Humber River—Black Creek* (initially York West); Huron—Bruce; Kanata—Carleton; Kenora; King—Vaughan; Kingston and the Islands; Kitchener Centre; Kitchener—Conestoga; Kitchener South—Hespeler; Lambton—Kent—Middlesex; Lanark—Frontenac—Kingston* (initially Lanark—Frontenac); Leeds—Grenville—Thousand Islands and Rideau Lakes* (initially Leeds—Grenville); London—Fanshawe; London North Centre; London West; Markham—Stouffville; Markham—Thornhill; Markham—Unionville; Milton; Mississauga Centre; Mississauga East—Cooksville* (change to Mississauga—Cooksville was reversed); Mississauga—Erin Mills; Mississauga—Lakeshore; Mississauga—Malton; Mississauga—Streetsville; Nepean; Newmarket—Aurora; Niagara Centre; Niagara Falls; Niagara West; Nickel Belt; Nipissing—Timiskaming; Northumberland—Peterborough South* (initially Northumberland—Pine Ridge); Oakville; Oakville North—Burlington; Orléans* (initially Ottawa—Orléans); Oshawa; Ottawa Centre; Ottawa South; Ottawa—Vanier; Ottawa West—Nepean; Oxford; Parkdale—High Park; Parry Sound-Muskoka; Perth Wellington; Peterborough—Kawartha* (initially Peterborough); Pickering—Uxbridge; Renfrew—Nipissing—Pembroke; Richmond Hill; St. Catharines; Sarnia—Lambton; Sault Ste. Marie; Scarborough—Agincourt; Scarborough Centre; Scarborough-Guildwood; Scarborough North; Scarborough—Rouge Park; Scarborough Southwest; Simcoe—Grey; Simcoe North; Spadina—Fort York; Stormont—Dundas—South Glengarry; Sudbury; Thornhill; Thunder Bay—Rainy River; Thunder Bay—Superior North; Timmins-James Bay; Toronto Centre; Toronto—Danforth; Toronto—St. Paul's* (initially St. Paul's); University—Rosedale; Vaughan—Woodbridge; Waterloo; Wellington—Halton Hills; Whitby; Willowdale; Windsor—Tecumseh; Windsor West; York Centre; York—Simcoe; York South—Weston
Prince Edward Island	4		Cardigan; Charlottetown; Egmont; Malpeque	
Quebec	78	3	Abitibi—Nunavik; Abitibi—Témiscamingue; Alfred-Dubuc; Alfred-Pellan; Anne-Hébert; Aylmer; Beauce; Bourassa; Brome—Missisquoi; Cap-Rouge; Charlevoix—Saguenay; Châteauguay; Compton—Stanstead; Côte-de-Beaupré; Curé-Labelle; Denis-Benjamin-Viger; Drummond; Elzéar-Bernier; Étienne-Parent; Gaspésie—Les Îles; George-Étienne-Cartier; Gilles-Villeneuve; Hautes-Laurentides—Pontiac; Hochelaga; Idola-Saint-Jean; John-Peters-Humphrey; Joliette; La Chute; Lachine—LaSalle; Lac-Saint-Jean; Lac-Saint-Louis; Laurentides; Lévis; Lignery; Longueuil; Lotbinière—Mégantic; Louis-Fréchette; MacDonald-Langstaff; Manicouagan; Maurice-Richard; Mille-Îles; Montarville; Montcalm; Montréal-Est; Nicolas-Vincent; Outaouais; Outremont; Ozias-Leduc; Papineau; Paul-Comtois; Paul-Ragueneau; Paul-Sauvé; Petite-Nation; Pierre-Legardeur; Plateau—Mile End; Québec; Richmond—Arthabaska; Rimouski; Rivière-des-Prairies; Roger-Lemelin; Sainte-Rose; Saint-Hyacinthe—Bagot; Saint-Jean; Saint-Lambert; Saint-Léonard; Sault-au-Récollet; Shawinigane; Shefford; Sherbrooke; Soulanges; Terrebonne; Trois-Rivières; Urbain-Brossard; Vaudreuil; Verchères—Les Patriotes; Verdun; Ville-Marie; Wilder-Penfield	Abitibi—Baie-James—Nunavik—Eeyou; Abitibi—Témiscamingue; Ahuntsic-Cartierville; Alfred-Pellan; Argenteuil—La Petite-Nation; Avignon—La Mitis—Matane—Matapédia; Beauce; Beauport—Côte-de-Beaupré—Île d'Orléans—Charlevoix* (initially Charlevoix—Montmorency); Beauport—Limoilou; Bécancour—Nicolet—Saurel; Bellechasse—Les Etchemins—Lévis; Beloeil—Chambly; Berthier—Maskinongé; Bourassa; Brome—Missisquoi; Brossard—Saint-Lambert; Charlesbourg—Haute-Saint-Charles; Châteauguay—Lacolle; Chicoutimi—Le Fjord* (change to Chicoutimi was reversed); Compton—Stanstead; Dorval—Lachine—LaSalle* (initially Dorval—Lachine); Drummond; Gaspésie—Les Îles-de-la-Madeleine; Gatineau; Hochelaga; Honoré-Mercier; Hull—Aylmer; Joliette; Jonquière; La Pointe-de-l'Île; La Prairie; Lac-Saint-Jean; Lac-Saint-Louis; LaSalle—Émard—Verdun* (initially LaSalle—Verdun); Laurentides—Labelle; Laurier—Sainte-Marie; Laval—Les Îles; Lévis—Lotbinière; Longueuil—Charles-LeMoyne* (initially LeMoyne); Longueuil—Saint-Hubert* (initially Longueuil); Louis-Hébert; Louis-Saint-Laurent; Manicouagan; Marc-Aurèle-Fortin* (change to Sainte-Rose reversed); Mégantic—L'Érable; Mirabel; Montarville; Montcalm; Montmagny—L'Islet—Kamouraska—Rivière-du-Loup; Mount Royal; Notre-Dame-de-Grâce—Westmount; Outremont; Papineau; Pierre-Boucher—Les Patriotes—Verchères* (initially Boucher—Les Patriotes—Verchères); Pierrefonds—Dollard; Pontiac; Portneuf—Jacques-Cartier; Québec; Repentigny; Richmond—Arthabaska; Rimouski-Neigette—Témiscouata—Les Basques* (change to Centre-du-Bas-Saint-Laurent was reversed); Rivière-des-Mille-Îles; Rivière-du-Nord; Rosemont—La Petite-Patrie; Saint-Hyacinthe—Bagot; Saint-Jean; Saint-Laurent; Saint-Léonard—Saint-Michel; Saint-Maurice—Champlain; Salaberry—Suroît; Shefford; Sherbrooke; Terrebonne; Thérèse-De Blainville* (initially Blainville); Trois-Rivières; Vaudreuil—Soulanges* (initially Soulanges—Vaudreuil); Ville-Marie—Le Sud-Ouest—Île-des-Sœurs* (initially Ville-Marie); Vimy
Saskatchewan	14		Cypress Hills—Grasslands; Desnethé—Missinippi—Churchill River; Kindersley—Rosetown—Humboldt; Lloydminster—Battlefords—Rosthern; Moose Jaw—Lake Centre—Lanigan; Prince Albert; Regina—Lewvan; Regina—Qu'Appelle; Saskatoon Centre—University; Saskatoon—Grasswood; Saskatoon West; Souris—Moose Mountain; Wascana; Yorkton—Melville	Battlefords—Lloydminster; Carlton Trail—Eagle Creek* (initially Humboldt—Warman—Martensville—Rosetown); Cypress Hills—Grasslands; Desnethé—Missinippi—Churchill River; Moose Jaw—Lake Centre—Lanigan; Prince Albert; Regina—Lewvan; Regina—Qu'Appelle; Regina—Wascana; Saskatoon—Grasswood; Saskatoon—University; Saskatoon West; Souris—Moose Mountain; Yorkton—Melville
Yukon	1		A commission was not required for Yukon since the territory is a single electoral district.	
Total	338	30		
