= Electoral district (Canada) =

Federal or provincial electoral district in Canada

Map of the 343 Canadian electoral districts represented in the House of Commons ( Interactive map version)

An electoral district in Canada is a geographical division upon which Canada's representative democracy is based. It is officially known in Canadian French as a circonscription but frequently called a comté ('county'). In Canadian English, it is also colloquially, and more commonly known as a riding or constituency.

Each federal electoral district returns one Member of Parliament (MP) to the House of Commons of Canada; each provincial or territorial electoral district returns one representative—called, depending on the province or territory, Member of the Legislative Assembly (MLA), Member of the National Assembly (MNA) (Note: Used in Québec.), Member of Provincial Parliament (MPP) (Note: Used in Ontario.) or Member of the House of Assembly (MHA) (Note: Used in Newfoundland.)—to the provincial or territorial legislature.

Beginning with the 2025 federal election, there have been 343 federal electoral districts in Canada. In provincial and territorial legislatures, the provinces and territories each set their own number of electoral districts independently of their federal representation. The province of Ontario used to define most of its provincial electoral districts to align with federal boundaries; no other province does so, and even Ontario maintains a few variances from federal boundaries. However the practice stopped in 2024, when the Ford government did not follow the 2022 Canadian federal electoral redistribution and held the 2025 Ontario general election using the same 2012 Canadian federal electoral redistribution boundaries used in the previous provincial election. The ward boundaries of Toronto City Council also correspond to provincial electoral district boundaries. They are numbered with the provincial names in brackets.

Elections Canada is the independent body set up by Parliament to oversee Canadian federal elections, while each province and territory has its own separate elections agency, such as Elections Ontario, to oversee the provincial and territorial elections.

== Terminology ==
In Canada, the most commonly used colloquial term for electoral district is riding in English, and comté in French (meaning "county"). The usage of both terms reflect the fact of electoral divisions being organized around counties in the 1800s. While both these terms were used in England and France and their respective spheres of cultural influence as divisions for feudal or local governance, their usage to denote electoral division is unique to Canada.

The word "riding", from Old English and Old Norse *þriðing, meaning one-third (compare farthing, literally "one-fourth"), is an English term denoting the three sub-divisions of Yorkshire each with its own local administration. The origin of ridings stem from the ancient county of Yorkshire being subdivided into the North, West and East ridings when Yorkshire was ruled by the Vikings in the late 9th century.

The term "riding" was introduced to Upper Canada via the royal proclamation issued by Lieutanant Governor John Graves Simcoe on July 16, 1792. The proclamation defined the province's original nineteen counties, and further divided three crucial counties — Glengarry (the eastern most county, bordering Quebec), Lincoln (where the provincial capital was located) and York (where the capital would move to in a few years) — further into "ridings". Ridings were however not initially defined for electoral purposes, but instead as judicial districts "for the speedy execution of justice". The two York ridings, for example, were not granted seats either individually or together in the 1st Parliament of Upper Canada, convened in 1792. York County, with its two ridings, had to share a seat with Durham County and the first riding of Lincoln County.

It was not until the 12th Parliament of Upper Canada, convened in 1834, that every defined riding had its own representative. Even then, riding seats only accounted for eight of the House of Assembly's sixty-one seats, with counties accounting for forty-seven of the remaining fifty-five. As the population of the counties grew, more and more of them needed to be further divided for administrative reasons. The creation of more ridings naturally led to the increasing use of the term in an electoral context.

At the time of Canadian Confederation, the first schedule of the British North America Act (in 1982 retitled the Constitution Act, 1867) specifically named Ontario's original 82 electoral districts to be used for both the dominion and provincial elections held that year, with details of how the counties with multiple seats are to be divided. While riding meant one-third, the term was applied to counties with two electoral districts as well. In fact, only three counties — Middlesex, Wellington and York — were divided to three ridings. The Country of York (at Confederation consisted of the area of present day York Region and City of Toronto, excluding the downtown area) were divided as East Riding, West Riding, and North Riding of York, as Yorkshire was divided, possibly by design to pay tribute to its origin.

In some of Canada's earliest censuses, in fact, some citizens in the Ontario ridings of Bothwell, Cardwell, Monck and Niagara listed their electoral district as their "county" of residence instead of their actual county.

Although the term "riding" is no longer used officially to indicate an electoral district, it remains the colloquial term most commonly used in English Canada. Soon after Confederation, the urban population grew—and more importantly, most city dwellers gained the franchise after property ownership was no longer required to gain the vote, and the term was adopted even for urban constituencies. A political party's local organization is generally known as a riding association; the legal term is electoral district association or EDA at the federal level, and constituency association in most provinces.

== Historical multi-member districts ==
While electoral districts at both the federal and provincial levels are now exclusively single-member districts, multiple-member districts were used in the past. The federal riding of Ottawa elected two members from 1872 to 1933. The federal riding of Halifax elected two members from 1867 to 1966 as prescribed in the British North America Act. The federal riding of Victoria elected two members from 1872 to 1903. As well, eight other federal ridings elected multiple (two) members at different times.

As well, every province plus the territories of Yukon and North-West Territories at one time or another used multi-seat districts. The use of multi-member districts usually led to the use of plurality block voting but occasionally other forms of voting were used in the multi-seat districts.

In the 1914 and 1915 Manitoba elections, Winnipeg was divided into three districts. Each time each district elected two members using a separate contest for each seat.

From 1920 to 1949 Winnipeg used single transferable vote (STV) to elect 10 MLAs in a single city-wide district. And then the city was made into three four-member districts, again with the seats in each district filled through STV. St. Boniface elected two MLAs in 1949 and 1953 through STV.

Alberta had three provincial districts that at various times returned two, five, six or seven members: see Calgary, Edmonton and Medicine Hat. Prior to 1924 these seats were filled through plurality block voting but from 1924 to 1956 the seats were filled through single transferable voting (STV). The Medicine Hat district reverted to being a single-member district prior to the 1930 election.

Saskatchewan used multi-member provincial districts from 1921 to 1967. Saskatoon, Regina and Moose Jaw used multiple-member districts from 1921 to 1967. These seats were filled through plurality block voting. District magnitude in each place varied from two to four between 1921 and 1964. Regina was broken up into two two-seat districts and two single-member districts in 1964; Saskatoon was given a fifth seat in the 1964.

British Columbia provincially had a mix of multiple-member districts and single-member districts at the provincial level from 1871 to the 1991 election. Members were elected through plurality (first past the post or plurality block voting). The only exception were the 1952 and 1953 elections, when instant-runoff voting was used. In the case of multi-member districts, separate contests were used to elect separate MLAs in the same district.

Prince Edward Island had two-member districts at the provincial level from Confederation to the 1996 election. MLAs in each were elected in each district using a separate contest for each seat.

In the case of New Brunswick, between 1935 and 1974, some ridings were multi member districts, electing more than one MLA in a district at each election. In 1935, districts ranged in size from two to four members. Block voting was used to fill the seats in each district.

In the case of Ontario, Toronto in 1886 and 1890 was a multi-member provincial district. limited voting was used to ensure mixed representation and voter satisfaction. From 1908 to 1914, the four Toronto districts elected two MLAs each, using a separate contest for each seat.

With just a few exceptions, voters in multiple-member districts were able to cast as many votes as there were seats in the district (block voting). Usually, under block voting, one single party took all the seats in the district. STV was used in Alberta and Manitoba multi-member districts from 1920s to 1950s. STV almost always produced mixed representation with no one-party sweep.

As mentioned, limited voting was used in Toronto when it was covered by a city-wide district in 1886 and 1890.

IRV was used in all BC districts including the multi-member districts, in 1952 and 1953. This voting system ensured that the winner had the support of a majority of votes in each contest (although in some cases member elected with majority of votes still in play at the end of the vote count, instead of majority of votes cast originally), but the seat/post system and instant-runoff voting election system did not produce proportional representation.

== Naming conventions ==
Electoral district names are usually geographic in nature, and chosen to represent the community or region within the electoral district boundaries. Some electoral districts in Quebec are named for historical figures rather than geography, e.g., Louis-Hébert, Honoré-Mercier. Similarly in Alberta, provincial districts mix geographic names with those of historical personages (e.g., Edmonton-Decore after Laurence Decore, Calgary-Lougheed after Peter Lougheed and James Alexander Lougheed). This practice is no longer employed in the other provinces and territories.

== Redistribution – Boundary adjustment for federal electoral districts ==
Electoral district boundaries are adjusted to reflect population changes after each decennial census through a process formally known as redistribution. Depending on the significance of a boundary change, an electoral district's name may change as well. Any adjustment of electoral district boundaries is official as of the date the changes are legislated, but is not put into actual effect until the first subsequent election. Thus, an electoral district may officially cease to exist, but will continue to be represented status quo in the House of Commons until the next election is called. This, for example, gives new riding associations time to organize, and prevents the confusion that would result from changing elected MPs' electoral district assignments in the middle of a Parliament.

On some occasions (e.g., Timiskaming—French River, Toronto—Danforth), a riding's name may be changed without a boundary adjustment. This usually happens when it is determined at a later date that the existing name is not sufficiently representative of the district's geographic boundaries. This is the only circumstance in which a sitting MP's riding name may change between elections.

=== Redistribution Occurrences ===
At Canadian Confederation, the boundaries were defined by the British North America Act, 1867 (renamed in 1982 as the Constitution Act, 1867).

Seats allocations to provinces based on the immediate prior decennial census, and consequently the electoral boundaries, were updated in 1872, 1882, 1892, 1903, 1914, 1924, 1933, 1947 and 1952 by statutes titled Representation Act, [YEAR].

Seats were further added to provide representation for new provinces at the elections held in 1874 (for Prince Edward Island), 1887 (For the Northwest Territories), 1908 (for Alberta and Saskatchewan) and 1949 (for Newfoundland).

The redistribution process was significantly revised by the Electoral Boundaries Readjustment Act passed in November 1964. Non partisan electoral boundaries commissions were to be established to revise the electoral district boundaries in each province. The descriptions of the electoral districts resulting from the process are included in a Representation Order prepared by the Chief Electoral Officer, given legal effect by proclamation of the Governor-in-Council and published in the Gazette. Due to the lateness of the passage of the legislation and the longer period required for the work of the commissions, the population data from the 1961 census was not reflected until the proclamation of the 1966 Representation Order and did not take effect until the 1968 federal election.

Electoral boundaries were update by Representation Orders issued in 1966, 1976, 1987, 1996, 2003, 2013 and 2023. Such changes come into force "on the first dissolution of Parliament that occurs at least seven months after the day on which that proclamation was issued".

=== Seats allocation on principle of representation by population ===
The electoral districts for the first federal election in 1867 were prescribed on the principle of representation by population. Quebec was allocated 65 to retain the 65 seats Canada East in the Parliament of the Province of Canada prior to confederation. Seats were allocated to other three provinces by dividing the average population of Quebec's 65 electoral districts to determine the number of seats for other provinces. The British North America Act also specified that distribution and boundary reviews should occur after each 10 year census.

The formula currently in effect for seat allocations to provinces was adopted in 2022. It starts by calculating an electoral quotient, based on the average of the growth rate of the provinces since the time of the last redistribution, the previous redistribution's electoral quotient is then multiplied by this average, and then the population of each individual province is divided by this electoral quotient then rounded up to determine the number of seats to which the province is officially entitled. Additionally, one seat is automatically allocated to each of Canada's three territories.

Initial Election	1867	1872	1874	1882	1887	1896	1904	1908	1917	1925	1935	1949	1953	1968	1979	1988	1997	2004	2015	2025
Newfoundland												7	7	7	7	7	7	7	7	7
Prince Edward Island			6	6	6	5	4	4	4	4	4	4	4	4	4	4	4	4	4	4
Nova Scotia	19	21	21	21	21	20	18	18	16	14	12	13	12	11	11	11	11	11	11	11
New Brunswick	15	16	16	16	16	14	13	13	11	11	10	10	10	10	10	10	10	10	10	10
Quebec	65	65	65	65	65	65	65	65	65	65	65	73	75	74	75	75	75	75	78	78
Ontario	82	88	88	92	92	92	86	86	82	82	82	83	85	88	95	99	103	106	121	122
Manitoba		4	4	5	5	7	10	10	15	17	17	16	14	13	14	14	14	14	14	14
Saskatchewan								10	16	21	21	20	17	13	14	14	14	14	14	14
Alberta								7	12	16	17	17	17	19	21	26	26	28	34	37
British Columbia		6	6	6	6	6	7	7	13	14	16	18	22	23	28	32	34	36	42	43
Territories					4	4	11	1	1	1	1	1	2	2	3	3	3	3	3	3
Total	181	200	206	211	215	213	214	221	235	245	245	262	265	264	282	295	301	308	338	343
Initial Election	1867	1872	1874	1882	1887	1896	1904	1908	1917	1925	1935	1949	1953	1968	1979	1988	1997	2004	2015	2025
Elections Held	1	1	2	1	2	2	1	2	2	3	3	1	6	3	3	2	2	4	3	1
Base Census	-	1871		1881		1891	1901		1911	1921	1931	1941	1951	1961	1971	1981	1991	2001	2011	2021
Legislative Source	BNA	Representation Acts												Representation Orders						
Legislative Source	1867	1872		1882		1892	1903		1914	1924	1933	1947	1952	1966	1976	1987	1996	2003	2013	2023

=== Deviations from representation by population ===
Two special rules are prescribed in the in effect to maintain the number of seats allocated to provinces with declining shares of the national population.

The Senatorial Clause, incorporated into the Constitution Act, 1867 (as section 51A) in 1915, prescribed that a province's number of seats in the House of Commons can never be lower than the province's representation in the Senate.

The Grandfather Clause, first enacted in the Representation Act, 1985, guarantees each province no fewer seats than it had at a particular point in history. The 1985 legislation was designed to limit rapid increase of the total number of MPs expected under the previous formular. To mitigate the likely corresponding decrease, a special provision was included to set each province's baseline number to their seat count in 33rd Parliament that was in session in 1985. The baseline numbers were further updated to the provinces' seat counts in the 43rd parliament (in session 2019 - 2021) by the government of Prime Minister Justin Trudeau in 2022 through the passing of the Preserving Provincial Representation in the House of Commons Act . As a result, the Chief Electoral Officer announced the new allocation of seats in July 2022 with a total 343 seats.

The Representation Rule, enacted in 2012 by the Fair Representation Act, further prescribes that no province that had a higher share of seats than its population share in the last redistribution can have its share of seats drop below its population share. In 2008 the government of Prime Minister Stephen Harper proposed an amendment to the process which would have given Alberta, British Columbia and Ontario, the three provinces whose electoral districts have an average size larger than those in Quebec, a total of 32 additional seats by applying Quebec's average of 105,000. In response to the ensuing opposition in Quebec, three new seats were allotted to Quebec as well. The measure was not pass before the 2011 election but was reintroduced and adopted in December 2011 and was put in effect through the 2012 redistribution process.

A province may be allocated extra seats over its base entitlement to ensure that these rules are met. In 2022, for example, Prince Edward Island would have only received two seats according to the electoral quotient, but through the senatorial clause the province maintained its four seats in the Commons, equal to its four senators. New Brunswick similarly maintained ten seats under the senatorial clause. Quebec would have 71 seats by the electoral quotient alone, but through the historic seats provision the province maintained the 78 seats it had in the 43rd Parliament. Saskatchewan, Manitoba, Nova Scotia and Newfoundland and Labrador also maintained seats under the historic seats provision.

In practice, the process results in most provinces maintaining the same number of seats from one redistribution to the next, due to the senatorial and historic seats provision. From 1985 onwards, only Ontario, Alberta and British Columbia, traditionally the country's three fastest-growing provinces, had gained seats in a redistribution. All other provinces still held the same number of seats that they held in 1985, and were thus already protected from losing any seats by the other clauses. The 2012 redistribution, which added three new seats in Quebec under the newly added representation rule, was the first and so far only time since 1985 that any of the other seven provinces had gained new seats.

Some sources incorrectly state that a special provision guaranteeing a certain number of seats to Quebec is also applied. While such a provision was proposed in the failed Charlottetown Accord, no such rule currently exists—Quebec's seat allotment in the House of Commons is in fact governed by the same adjustment clauses as all other provinces, and not by any provisions unique to Quebec alone. However, such provisions have existed at various times in the past. From 1867 to 1946 Quebec was allocated 65 seats, with the other provinces allocated seats based on their size relative to Quebec. The "amalgam formula" of 1976 set the number of Quebec seats to 75, which was to be increased by 4 after each decennial census. Other "large" provinces (over 2.5 million) would be assigned seats based on their relative population to Quebec. The amalgam formula was applied only once, based on the 1971 census. After the 1981 census it was realized that adding an additional four seats to Quebec every ten years would rapidly inflate the size of the House of Commons, so that formula was abandoned in favour of the 1985 Representation Act.

=== Boundary review of federal electoral districts ===
When the province's final seat allotment is determined, an independent election boundaries commission in each province reviews the existing boundaries and proposes adjustments. Public input is then sought, which may then lead to changes in the final boundary proposal. For instance, the proposed boundaries may not accurately reflect a community's historical, political or economic relationship with its surrounding region; the community would thus advise the boundary commission that it wished to be included in a different electoral district.

For example, in the 2003 boundary adjustment, the boundary commission in Ontario originally proposed dividing the city of Greater Sudbury into three districts. The urban core would have remained largely unchanged as Sudbury, while communities west of the central city would have been merged with Algoma—Manitoulin to form the new riding of Greater Sudbury—Manitoulin, and those east and north of the central city would have been merged with Timiskaming to create the riding of Timiskaming—Greater Sudbury.

Due to the region's economic and transportation patterns, however, "Timiskaming—Greater Sudbury" was particularly opposed by its potential residents — voters in Sudbury were concerned about the weakening of their representation if the city were divided into one city-based riding and two large rural ones rather than two city-based ridings, while the Timiskaming District is much more strongly aligned with and connected to North Bay, to which it has a direct highway link, than to Sudbury. In a deputation to the boundary commission, Sudbury's deputy mayor Ron Dupuis stated that "An electoral district must be more than a mere conglomeration of arbitrary and random groups of individuals. Districts should, as much as possible, be cohesive units with common interests related to representation. This makes a representative's job of articulating the interests of his or her constituency much easier." Instead, in the final report that was passed by the House of Commons, the Sudbury area's existing ridings of Sudbury and Nickel Belt were retained with only minor boundary adjustments, while the Timiskaming riding was merged with Nipissing. Despite the opposition that arose to the 2003 process, however, virtually the same tripartite division of the city was proposed in the boundary adjustment of 2012, although due to concerns around balancing the Northern Ontario region's population against its geographic size, the commission announced in 2013 that it would retain the existing electoral districts again.

Similarly, opposition arose in Toronto during the 2012 redistribution process, especially to a proposal which would have divided the Church and Wellesley neighbourhood, the city's primary gay village, between the existing riding of Toronto Centre and a new riding of Mount Pleasant along the length of Wellesley Street. In the final report, the northern boundary of Toronto Centre was shifted north to Charles Street.

Once the final report is produced, it is then submitted to Parliament, MPs may offer objections to the boundaries, but the boundary commissions are not compelled to make any changes as a result of the objections.

== Boundary adjustment for provincial and territorial electoral districts ==
The boundary adjustment processes for electoral districts in provincial or territorial legislative assemblies follow provincial or territorial, rather than federal, law; they are overseen by each province's or territory's own election agency rather than by Elections Canada, and legislated by the provincial legislature rather than the federal parliament. Each province is free to decide its own number of legislative assembly seats, and is not required to comply with the federal quotas that govern its number of parliamentary districts.

=== Ontario ===
Prior to 1999, provincial electoral districts were defined independently of federal districts; at the time of the 1995 Ontario general election, the province had 103 seats in the Canadian House of Commons but 130 in its provincial legislature. For the 1999 Ontario general election, however, the government of Mike Harris passed legislation which mandated that seats in the provincial legislature would follow federal electoral district boundaries, both reducing the size of the legislature and eliminating the cost of the province conducting its own boundary adjustment process. After each federal boundary adjustment, seats in the legislative assembly would henceforth be automatically realigned to match the federal boundaries at the first subsequent provincial election.

Although most electoral districts in the province still conform to federal boundaries, later amendments to the 1999 legislation have reauthorized the introduction of some differences from the federal map. In the Southern Ontario region, provincial districts remain in precise alignment with the federal ones; in the Northern Ontario region, however, because the region's slower growth would result in the gradual loss of seats compared to the more rapidly growing south, most districts still retain the same boundaries as the federal districts that were in place as of 2003, and are not readjusted to correspond to current federal boundaries. For the 2018 Ontario general election, further, two new uniquely provincial districts were added to increase representation for the far north of the province. As a result, the province currently has 121 seats in the House of Commons, but 124 seats in the provincial legislature.

Following the 2022 federal electoral redistribution, Premier Doug Ford announced his government would break with tradition and not update the provincial boundaries to match those of the new federal ridings, meaning the majority of Ontario's provincial ridings will have different names and/or borders from their federal counterparts following the 2025 federal election.

=== Prince Edward Island ===
When Prince Edward Island joined Confederation in 1873, it set a fixed formula in which each of the province's three counties was divided into five electoral districts per county, each of which elected two representatives to the provincial legislature. These districts were never adjusted for demographic changes, except in 1966 when the district for the capital city of Charlottetown was divided into two. After 1966, however, the electoral district boundaries again remained unchanged until 1996, when the province adopted new single-member districts. Under the new model, electoral districts are now adjusted every ten years, although most adjustments are geographically modest and the district's name is sometimes, but not always, the only substantive change that actually occurs.

== Political issues ==
Because electoral district boundaries are proposed by an arm's-length body, rather than directly by political parties themselves, gerrymandering is not generally seen as an issue in Canada. However, in 2006 the provincial government of Prince Edward Island was accused of gerrymandering after it rejected the independent boundary commission's report and instead proposed a new map that would have seen the cities of Charlottetown and Summerside each gain one additional seat, with two fewer seats allocated to rural areas of the province. The alternate map gave every incumbent member of the governing party a "safe" seat to run in, while the original report would have forced some of the party's MLAs to compete against each other in nomination contests.

The unequal size of electoral districts across Canada has sometimes given rise to discussion of whether all Canadians enjoy equal democratic representation by population. For example, the four federal electoral districts in Prince Edward Island have an average size of just 33,963 voters each, while federal electoral districts in Ontario, Alberta and British Columbia have an average size of over 125,000 voters each—only slightly smaller than the entire population of Prince Edward Island.

Conversely, pure representation by population creates distinct disadvantages for some Canadians, giving rise to frequent debate about how to balance the population size of electoral districts against their geographic size. Whereas urban districts, such as Toronto Centre, Vancouver Centre or Papineau, may be as small as 15 square kilometres (5.8 sq mi) or less, more rural districts, such as Timmins-James Bay, Abitibi—Baie-James—Nunavik—Eeyou or Desnethé—Missinippi—Churchill River may encompass tens or hundreds of thousands of square kilometres. Thus, while Canadians who reside in major urban centres typically live within walking distance of their federal or provincial representatives' constituency offices, a rural resident may not even be able to call their federal or provincial representative's constituency offices without incurring long-distance calling charges.

Further, a rural politician who represents dozens of geographically dispersed small towns must normally incur much greater travel expenses, being forced to drive for several hours, or even to travel by air, in order to visit parts of their own district—and may even need to maintain more than one constituency office in order to properly represent all of their constituents. In Ontario, for example, the highest annual expense budgets among members of the Legislative Assembly of Ontario are consistently filed by the representatives for Mushkegowuk—James Bay and Kiiwetinoong, the province's two largest and northernmost electoral districts; both must spend far more on travel to and from Toronto, travel within their own ridings and additional support staff in multiple communities within their ridings than any other legislator in the province.

== Demographics of ridings ==
A 2017 study found, that 41 of the 338 federal ridings at the time, have populations where visible minorities/non-Whites form the majority of the riding. Ontario and British Columbia have the largest number of ridings where visible minorities form the majority. Quebec has the most ridings with less than 5% visible minorities.

== See also ==
- Electoral district
- Constituency
- List of Canadian electoral districts
- Historical federal electoral districts of Canada
- Canadian provincial electoral districts
- Population of Canadian federal ridings
- Riding (division)
