= Representation Act =

The Representation Act has been the title of several acts of the Parliament of Canada. Notable acts with this designation include:

- The Representation Act, 1985, an amendment to the Constitution Act, 1867.
- The Representation Act, an act that formerly governed Electoral Redistributions.
