= Member of Parliament (Canada) =

Federal representative elected by Canadian voters

- Député (French)
- Arms of the House of Commons

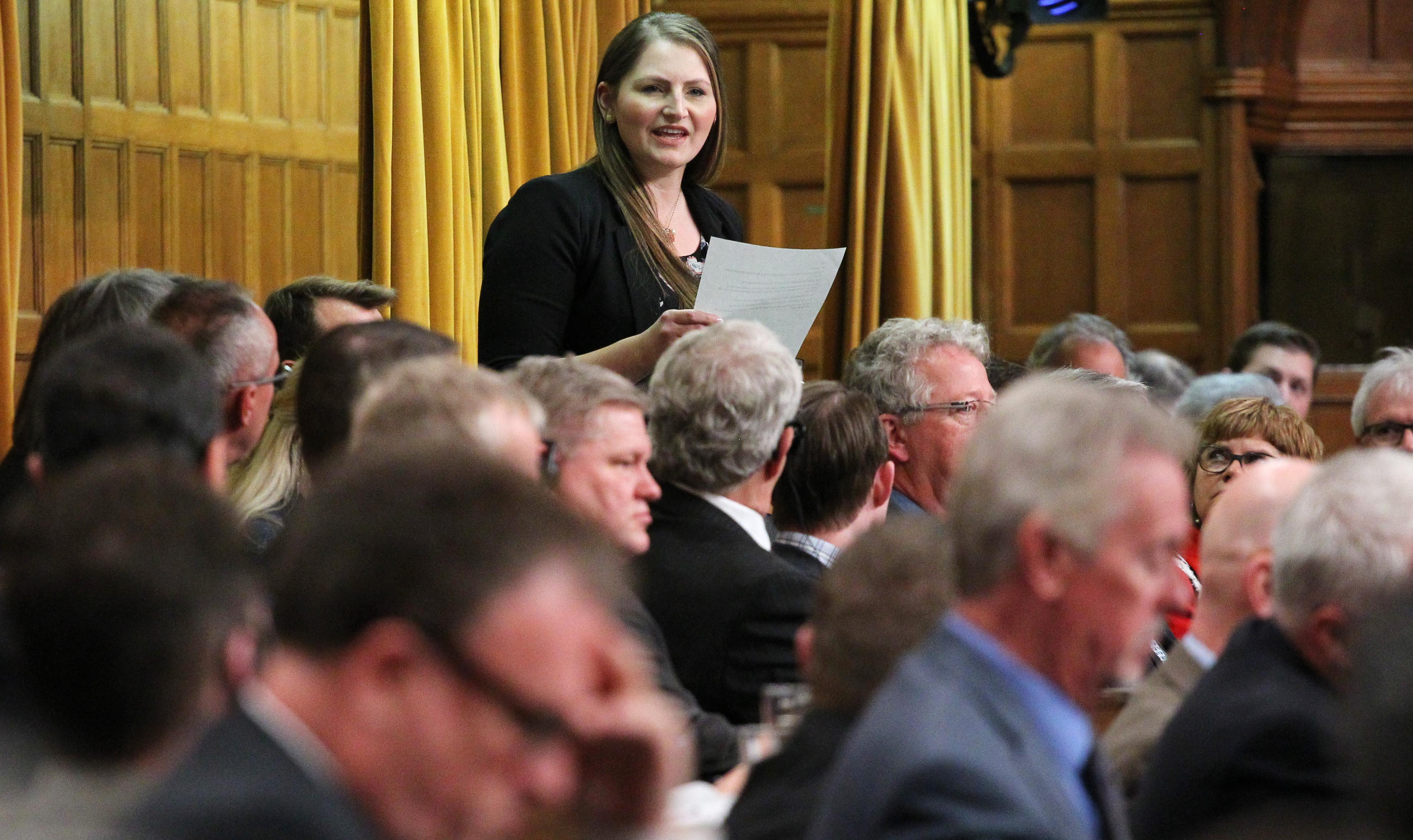
- Members of Parliament debate in the Centre Block in Ottawa, 2018
- Abbreviation: MP
- Member of: House of Commons of Canada
- Seat: Canadian Parliament Buildings
- Term length: Up to 5 years, renewable
- Constituting instrument: Constitution Act, 1867
- Salary: CA$217,700/year

A member of Parliament (post-nominal letters: MP; French: député, [depyte]) is an elected politician who serves in the House of Commons of Canada, the lower house of the Parliament of Canada.

== Terminology ==
The term's primary use is in reference to the members of the House of Commons. In legislation, it can also refer to the members of the Senate of Canada, but in common usage, the title senator (French: sénateur (masculine), sénatrice (feminine)) is typically used. By contrast, no such alternate title exists for members of the House of Commons. A less ambiguous term for members of both chambers is parliamentarian.

MPs each represent an individual electoral district, also known as a constituency or riding. MPs are elected using the first-past-the-post system in a general election or by-election, usually held every four years or less. In contrast, the 105 members of the Senate are appointed by the Crown on the advice of the prime minister.

== Representation ==
Seats are distributed among the provinces in proportion to population, as determined by each decennial census, subject to the following exceptions made by the Constitution of Canada. Firstly, the "Senate floor" guarantees that each province will have at least as many elected MPs as senators. Secondly, the "grandfather clause" guarantees each province has at least as many seats now as it had allocated in the 1985 Representation Act.

Following the 2022 Canadian federal electoral redistribution, the number of members is 343.

== Oath and affirmation ==
The oath for members of Parliament has stood the same since Confederation; according to Section IX.128 of the Constitution Act, 1867: "Every member of the Senate and the House of Commons of Canada shall before taking his Seat therein take and subscribe before the Governor General or some Person authorized by him, and every Member of a Legislative Council or Legislative Assembly of any Province shall before the Lieutenant Governor of the Province or some Person authorized by him, the Oath of Allegiance contained in the Fifth Schedule to the Act." The oath set out in said schedule is: I, [name], do swear, that I will be faithful and bear true Allegiance to Her Majesty Queen Victoria, with the further instruction that "the name of the King or Queen of the United Kingdom of Great Britain and Ireland for the Time being is to be substituted from Time to Time, with Proper Terms of Reference thereto." The oath reads as follows:

I, [name], do swear, that I will be faithful and bear true allegiance to His Majesty King Charles III.

Or in French:

Je, [nom], jure que je serai fidèle et porterai une vraie allégeance à Sa Majesté le Roi Charles III.

For those parliamentarians whose religion prohibits the swearing of oaths, there exists a compromise affirmation, first instituted in 1905:

I, [name], do solemnly, sincerely and truly affirm and declare the taking of an oath is according to my religious belief unlawful, and I do also solemnly, sincerely and truly affirm and declare that I will be faithful and bear true allegiance to His Majesty King Charles III.

== Number of members ==
Parliament(s)	Years	# of Ridings	+/–
1st	1867–1872	180	Steady
2nd	1872–1874	200	▲20
3rd, 4th	1874–1882	206	▲6
5th	1882–1887	211	▲5
6th, 7th	1887–1896	215	▲4
8th, 9th	1896–1904	213	▼2
10th	1904–1908	214	▲1
11th, 12th	1908–1917	221	▲7
13th, 14th	1917–1925	235	▲14
15th, 16th, 17th, 18th, 19th, 20th	1925–1949	245	▲10
21st	1949–1953	262	▲17
22nd, 23rd, 24th, 25th, 26th, 27th	1953–1968	265	▲3
28th, 29th, 30th	1968–1979	264	▼1
31st, 32nd, 33rd	1979–1988	282	▲18
34th, 35th	1988–1997	295	▲13
36th, 37th	1997–2004	301	▲6
38th, 39th, 40th, 41st	2004–2015	308	▲7
42nd, 43rd, 44th	2015–2025	338	▲30
45th	Since 2025	343	▲5

== Privileges ==
Parliamentarians enjoy parliamentary privilege, as derived from common law.

In 2024, the annual salary of each MP was CA$203,100. Members may receive additional sums by virtue of other positions or functions they hold, such as that of Prime Minister, Speaker of the House or a minister of the Crown.

== See also ==
- Member of parliament
