= House of Commons of Canada =

Lower house of the Parliament of Canada

Coordinates: 45°25′24″N 75°42′2″W

House of Commons of Canada Chambre des communes du Canada
- 45th Parliament

Type
- Type: Lower house of the Parliament of Canada

History
- Founded: July 1, 1867 (commencement of the Constitution Act); September 24, 1867 (first summoned)

Leadership
- Speaker: Francis Scarpaleggia, Liberal since May 26, 2025
- Prime Minister: Mark Carney, Liberal since March 14, 2025
- Leader of the Opposition: Pierre Poilievre, Conservative since August 18, 2025
- Government House Leader: Steven MacKinnon, Liberal since May 13, 2025
- Opposition House Leader: Andrew Scheer, Conservative since September 13, 2022

Structure
- Seats: 343 (172 needed for a majority)
- Political groups: His Majesty's Government: Liberal (173); His Majesty's Loyal Opposition: Conservative (137); Parties with official status: Bloc Québécois (21); Parties without official status: New Democratic (5); Green (1); Vacancies: Vacant (6)
- Salary: CA$209,800

Elections
- Voting system: First-past-the-post
- First election: August 7 – September 20, 1867
- Last election: April 28, 2025
- Next election: On or before October 15, 2029
- Redistricting: Every ten years, under the Electoral Boundaries Readjustment Act

Meeting place
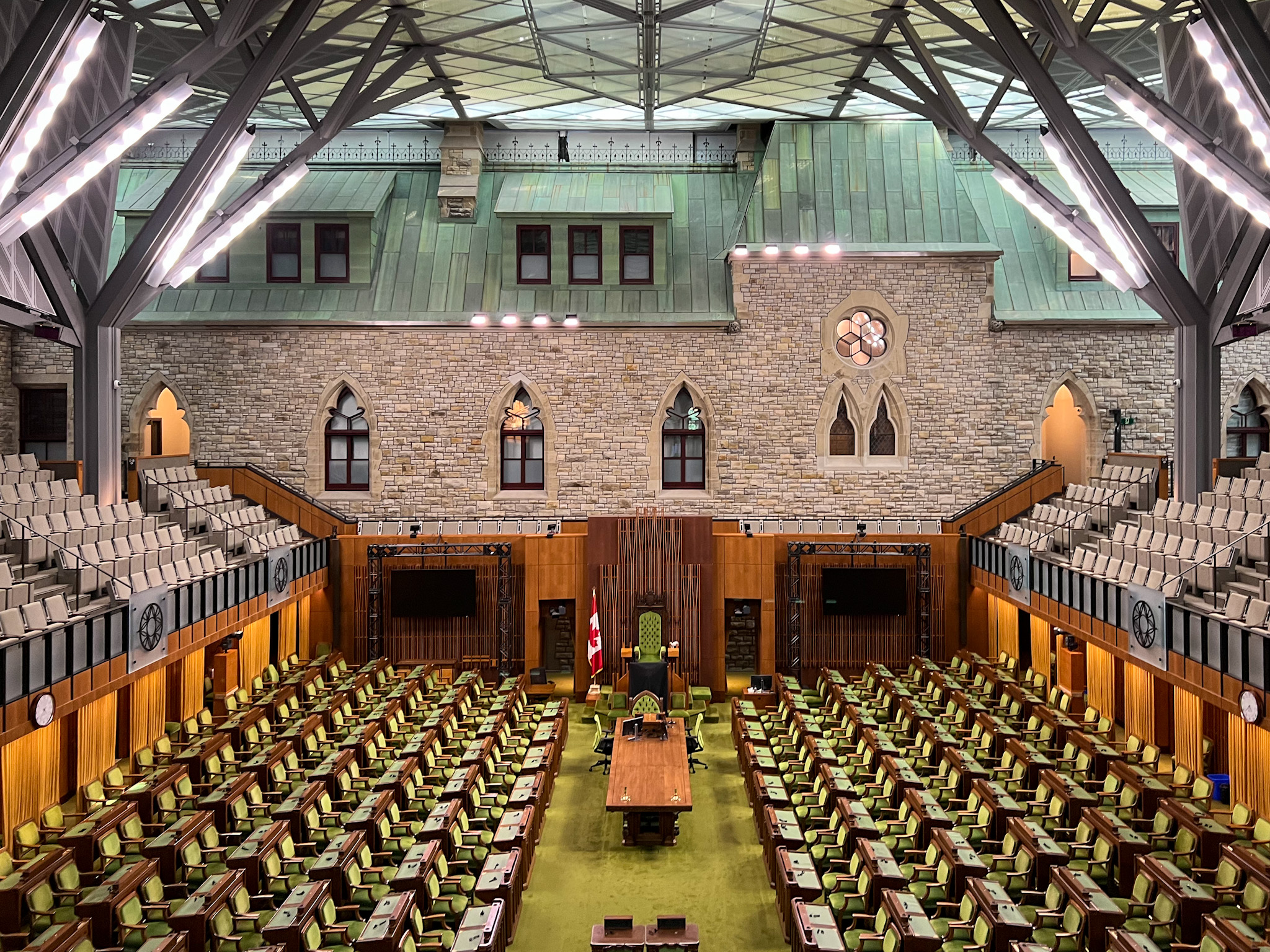
- House of Commons Chamber; West Block – Parliament Hill; Ottawa, Ontario; Canada

Website
- www.ourcommons.ca

Constitution
- Constitution Act, 1867

Rules
- Standing Orders of the House of Commons (English, French)

The House of Commons of Canada (French: Chambre des communes du Canada) is the lower house of the Parliament of Canada. Together with the King and the Senate of Canada, it forms the bicameral legislature of Canada.

The House of Commons is a democratically elected body whose members are known as members of Parliament (MPs). The number of MPs is adjusted periodically in alignment with each decennial census. Since the 2025 federal election, the number of seats in the House of Commons has been 343.

Members are elected by single-member plurality (the "first-past-the-post" system) in each of the country's electoral districts, which are colloquially known as ridings. MPs may hold office until Parliament is dissolved and serve for constitutionally limited terms of up to five years after an election. Historically, however, terms have ended before their expiry and the sitting government has typically dissolved parliament within four years of an election according to a long-standing convention. In any case, an act of Parliament now limits each term to four years. Seats in the House of Commons are distributed roughly in proportion to the population of each province and territory. However, some ridings are more populous than others, and the Canadian constitution contains provisions regarding provincial representation. As a result, there is some interprovincial and regional malapportionment relative to the population.

The British North America Act, 1867 (now called the Constitution Act, 1867) created the House of Commons, modelling it on the British House of Commons. As the lower of the two houses of Parliament, the House of Commons holds far more power in practice than the upper house, the Senate. Although the approval of both chambers is necessary for legislation to become law, the Senate only occasionally amends bills passed by the House of Commons and rarely rejects them. Moreover, the Cabinet is responsible primarily to the House of Commons. The government stays in office only as long as it retains the support, or "confidence", of the lower house.

The traditional meeting chamber of the House of Commons is in the Centre Block of the Parliament Hill complex in Ottawa. However, as of 2026, Centre Block is undergoing renovations; the House of Commons is therefore meeting in a temporary chamber in the West Block of the complex.

== Etymology ==
The term derives from the Anglo-Norman word communes, referring to the geographic and collective "communities" represented in Parliament rather than the third estate, or commonality. This distinction is made clear in the official French name of the body, Chambre des communes. Canada and the United Kingdom remain the only countries to use the name "House of Commons" for a lower house of parliament. The body's formal name is The Honourable the Commons of Canada in Parliament assembled (French: l'Honorable Chambre des communes du Canada, en Parlement assemblée).

== History ==
The House of Commons came into existence in 1867, when the British Parliament passed the British North America Act 1867, uniting the Province of Canada (which was divided into Quebec and Ontario), Nova Scotia and New Brunswick into a single federation called Canada. The new Parliament of Canada consisted of the monarch (represented by the governor general, who also represented the Colonial Office), the Senate and the House of Commons. The Parliament of Canada was based on the Westminster model (that is, the model of the Parliament of the United Kingdom). Unlike the UK Parliament, the powers of the Parliament of Canada were limited in that other powers were assigned exclusively to the provincial legislatures. The Parliament of Canada also remained subordinate to the British Parliament, the supreme legislative authority for the entire British Empire. Greater autonomy was granted by the Statute of Westminster 1931, after which new acts of the British Parliament did not apply to Canada, with some exceptions. These exceptions were removed by the Canada Act 1982.

From 1867, the Commons met in the chamber previously used by the Legislative Assembly of Canada until the building was destroyed by fire in 1916. It relocated to the amphitheatre of the Victoria Memorial Museum – what is today the Canadian Museum of Nature, where it met until 1922. Until the end of 2018, the Commons sat in the Centre Block chamber. Since the final sitting before the 2019 federal election, the Commons has sat in a temporary chamber in the West Block until at least 2032, while renovations are undertaken in the Centre Block of Parliament.

== Leadership ==
=== Standings in the 45th Canadian Parliament ===
Standings in the 45th Canadian Parliament
Affiliation	House members			Senate members		
Affiliation	2025 election results	Oct. 2026	+/–	On election day 2025	Oct. 2026	+/–
Liberal	169	173	▲4	–	–	Steady
Conservative	144	137	▼7	12	13	▲1
Bloc Québécois	22	21	▼1	–	–	Steady
New Democratic	7	5	▼2	–	–	Steady
Green	1	1	Steady	–	–	Steady
Independent Senators Group	–	–	Steady	45	37	▼8
Canadian Senators Group	–	–	Steady	18	15	▼3
Progressive Senate Group	–	–	Steady	18	17	▼1
Government Representative’s Office	–	–	Steady	–	5	▲5
Independent or non-affiliated	–	–	Steady	12	5	▼7
Total members	343	337		105	93	
Vacant	0	6	▲6	0	12	▲12
Total seats	343			105		
* As of 23 September 2026

=== Ceremonial and Constitutional officers ===
Following an election, the House of Commons elects a presiding officer, known as the speaker, at the beginning of each new parliamentary term, and also whenever a vacancy arises. Formerly, the prime minister determined who would serve as speaker. Although the House voted on the matter, the voting constituted a mere formality. Since 1986, however, the House has elected speakers by secret ballot. The speaker is assisted by a deputy speaker, who also holds the title of chair of Committees of the Whole. Two other deputies—the deputy chair of Committees of the Whole and the assistant deputy chair of Committees of the Whole—also preside. The duties of presiding over the House are divided among the four officers; however, the speaker usually presides over Question Period and over the most important debates.

Officers of the House who are not members include the clerk of the House of Commons, the deputy clerk, the law clerk and parliamentary counsel, and several other clerks. These officers advise the speaker and members on the rules and procedure of the House in addition to exercising senior management functions within the House administration. Another important officer is the sergeant-at-arms, whose duties include the maintenance of order and security on the House's premises and inside the buildings of the parliamentary precinct. (The Royal Canadian Mounted Police patrol Parliament Hill but are not allowed into the buildings unless asked by the speaker). The sergeant-at-arms also carries the ceremonial mace, a symbol of the authority of the Crown and the House of Commons, into the House each sitting. The House is also staffed by parliamentary pages, who carry messages to the members in the chamber and otherwise provide assistance to the House.

The term member of Parliament is usually used only to refer to elected members of the House of Commons, even though the Senate is also a part of Parliament. Members of the House of Commons may use the post-nominal letters "MP". The annual salary of each MP, as of November 2024, was $203,100; members may receive additional salaries for other offices they hold (for instance, the speakership). MPs rank immediately below senators in the order of precedence.

=== Committees ===
The Parliament of Canada uses committees for a variety of purposes. Committees consider bills in detail and may make amendments. Other committees scrutinize various Government agencies and ministries.

Potentially, the largest of the Commons committees are the Committees of the Whole, which, as the name suggests, consist of all the members of the House. A Committee of the Whole meets in the Chamber of the House but proceeds under slightly modified rules of debate. (For example, a member may make more than one speech on a motion in a Committee of the Whole, but not during a normal session of the House.) Instead of the speaker, the chair, deputy chair, or assistant deputy chair presides. The House resolves itself into a Committee of the Whole to discuss appropriation bills, and sometimes for other legislation.

The House of Commons also has several standing committees, each of which has responsibility for a particular area of government (for example, finance or transport). These committees oversee the relevant government departments, may hold hearings and collect evidence on governmental operations and review departmental spending plans. Standing committees may also consider and amend bills. Standing committees consist of between sixteen and eighteen members each, and elect their chairs.

Some bills are considered by legislative committees, each of which consists of up to fifteen members. The membership of each legislative committee roughly reflects the strength of the parties in the whole House. A legislative committee is appointed on an ad hoc basis to study and amend a specific bill. Also, the chair of a legislative committee is not elected by the members of the committee but is instead appointed by the speaker, normally from among the speaker's deputies. Most bills, however, are referred to standing committees rather than legislative committees.

The House may also create ad hoc committees to study matters other than bills. Such committees are known as special committees. Each such body, like a legislative committee, may consist of no more than fifteen members. Other committees include joint committees, which include both members of the House of Commons and senators; such committees may hold hearings and oversee government, but do not revise legislation.

Current committees:

- Indigenous and Northern Affairs
- Access to Information, Privacy and Ethics
- Agriculture and Agri-Food
- Canadian Heritage
- Citizenship and Immigration
- Environment and Sustainable Development
- Finance
- Fisheries and Oceans
- Foreign Affairs and International Development
- Government Operations and Estimates
- Health
- Human Resources, Skills and Social Development and the Status of Persons with Disabilities
- Industry, Science and Technology
- International Trade
- Justice and Human Rights
- Liaison Committee
- National Defence
- Natural Resources
- Official Languages
- Procedure and House Affairs
- Public Accounts
- Public Safety and National Security
- Status of Women
- Transport, Infrastructure and Communities
- Veterans Affairs

Former committees:

- Electoral Reform

== Members and electoral districts ==
=== Composition ===
The House of Commons is composed of Members of Parliament (MPs), each of whom represents a single geographic constituency called an electoral district (also known colloquially as a riding). The constitution specifies that each province is entitled to one MP for every unit of population (called the "electoral quotient") it has, or part thereof, but additional MPs are allocated according to various clauses described below. Territorial representation is independent of the population; each territory is entitled to one seat.

The number of MPs is adjusted periodically through a process called redistribution conducted in alignment with each decennial census. Since 2025, when the most recent redistribution took effect, there have been 343 MPs, distributed by province and territory as follows:

Province	Population (2021 census)	Total MPs	Average population per MP
Ontario	14,223,942	122	116,589
Quebec	8,501,833	78	108,998
British Columbia	5,000,879	43	116,299
Alberta	4,262,635	37	115,206
Manitoba	1,342,153	14	95,868
Saskatchewan	1,132,505	14	80,893
Nova Scotia	969,383	11	88,126
New Brunswick	775,610	10	77,561
Newfoundland and Labrador	510,550	7	72,936
Prince Edward Island	154,331	4	38,583
Total for provinces	36,873,821	340	108,452
Northwest Territories	41,070	1	41,070
Yukon	40,232	1	40,232
Nunavut	36,858	1	36,858
Total for territories	118,160	3	39,387
National total	36,991,981	343	107,848

Section 51 of the Constitution Act, 1867 specifies how seats are to be distributed among the provinces in proportion to population, subject to the following exceptions:

- Firstly, the "senatorial clause" guarantees that each province will have at least as many MPs as senators. This provision was added to the constitution in 1915.
- Secondly, the "grandfather clause" guarantees that each province has at least as many Members of Parliament now as it has had since the 2015 election. This clause was added in 1985, when it originally set the floor for each province as the number of MPs it had in 1985 (in effect the number of seats since the 1979 election), but it was amended in 2022 to be the number of members in the 43rd Canadian Parliament.
- Finally, the "representation rule" ensures that any province that has historically been over-represented in proportion to its population (seven of the ten provinces, as of 2022) remains so, even if application of the other provisions would result in it becoming under-represented. This clause was added in 2011.

As a result of these clauses, the six smallest provinces are over-represented in the House. Ontario, British Columbia, and Alberta are under-represented in proportion to their populations, while Quebec's representation is close to the national average (107,848 as at the 2025 election, based on the 2021 census). The "representation rule" was added in 2011 with the intent of adding a de facto backstop to ensure that the disproportionate representation afforded the six smallest provinces, which are all majority English-speaking, did not result in an overall linguistic bias in the composition of the House of Commons by ensuring French-speaking Quebec obtained sufficient additional MPs of its own to always remain just under the national average.

In Canada, the calculation of provincial representation considers the entire permanent population rather than citizens or eligible electors, in effect giving children and adults who do not qualify to vote equal weight to registrable persons. The electoral quotient was 111,166 for the redistribution of seats after the 2011 census and is adjusted pro rata following each decennial census to account for population changes since the previous census. The population of the province is then divided by the electoral quotient and rounded upwards to the next whole number, giving the base provincial-seat allocation. The "special clauses" are then applied to increase the number of seats for certain provinces. The most recent reapportionment in seats resulted in 318 seats (including upward rounding) being assigned to provinces based on population, 22 more assigned to provinces via special clauses, and 3 seats assigned to the territories for a total of 343.

The application of the above-noted constitutional provisions has meant every census since 1941 has triggered an increase in the size of the House of Commons. However, the House has grown in size considerably more slowly than the Canadian population and the ratio of residents to MPs has widened steadily.

Following the apportionment of seats among the provinces, boundary commissions appointed by the federal government draw electoral district boundaries in each province.

=== Prerequisites and qualifications ===
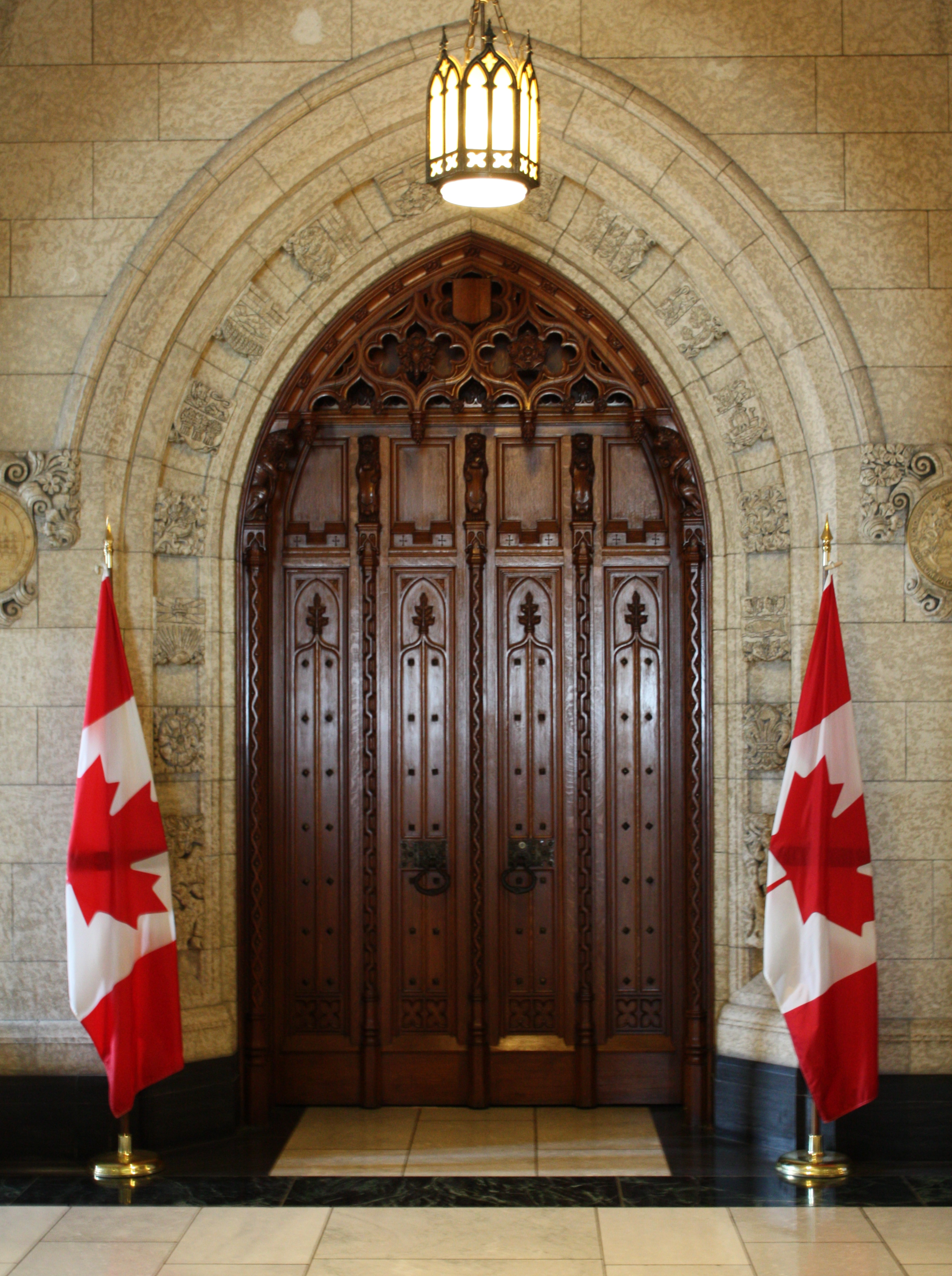
The main doorway into the chamber of the House of Commons

Under the Constitution Act, 1867, Parliament is empowered to determine the qualifications of members of the House of Commons. The present qualifications are outlined in the Canada Elections Act, which was passed in 2000. Under the Act, in order to stand as a candidate, individuals must be eligible voters as of the day of nomination. Thus, minors and individuals who are not citizens of Canada are not allowed to become candidates. The Canada Elections Act also bars prisoners from standing for election (although they may vote). Moreover, individuals found guilty of election-related crimes are prohibited from becoming members for five years (in some cases, seven years) after conviction.

The Act also prohibits certain officials from standing for the House of Commons. These officers include members of provincial and territorial legislatures (although this was not always the case), sheriffs, crown attorneys, most judges, and election officers. The chief electoral officer (the head of Elections Canada, the federal agency responsible for conducting elections) is prohibited from standing as a candidate and, until recently, was prohibited from voting. Finally, under the Constitution Act, 1867, a member of the Senate may not also become a member of the House of Commons, and MPs must give up their seats when appointed to the Senate or the bench.

== General elections ==
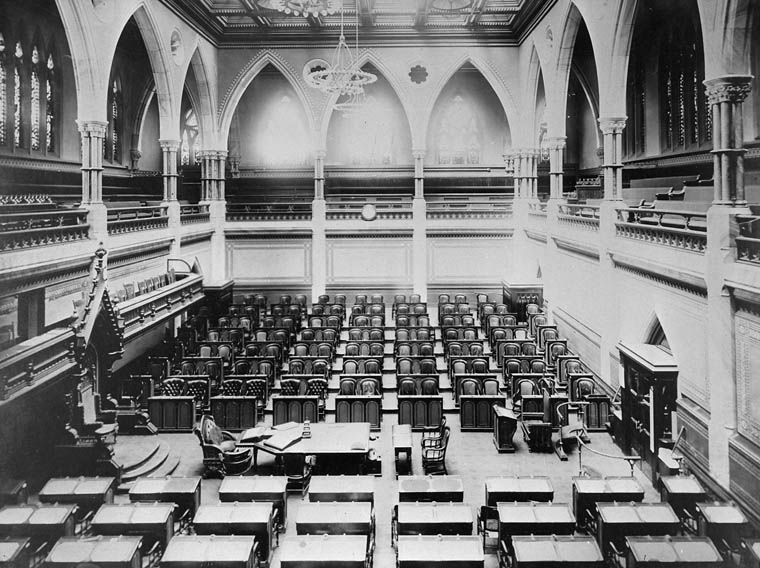
The Canadian House of Commons, 1916

Elections Canada is the independent, non-partisan agency responsible for conducting federal elections and referendums.

General elections occur whenever Parliament is dissolved by the governor general on the monarch's behalf. The timing of the dissolution has historically been chosen by the prime minister. The Constitution Act, 1867 provides that a Parliament may last no longer than five years. Canadian election law requires that elections must be held on the third Monday in October in the fourth year after the last election, subject to the discretion of the Crown. Campaigns must be at least 36 days long. Candidates are usually nominated by political parties. A candidate can run independently, although it is rare for such a candidate to win. Most successful independent candidates have been incumbents who were expelled from their political parties (for example, John Nunziata in 1997 or Jody Wilson-Raybould in 2019) or who failed to win their parties' nomination (for example, Chuck Cadman in 2004). Most Canadian candidates are chosen in meetings called by their party's local association. In practice, the candidate who signs up the most local party members generally wins the nomination. There is no set date for an election to take place.

To run for a seat in the House, candidates must file nomination papers bearing the signatures of at least 50 or 100 constituents (depending on the size of the electoral district). Each electoral district returns one member using the first-past-the-post electoral system, under which the candidate with a plurality of votes wins. To vote, one must be a citizen of Canada and at least eighteen years of age. Declining the ballot, which is possible in several provinces, is not an option under current federal regulations.

Once elected, a member of Parliament normally continues to serve until the next dissolution of parliament. If a member dies, resigns, or ceases to be qualified, their seat falls vacant. It is also possible for the House of Commons to expel a member, but this power is only exercised when the member has engaged in serious misconduct or criminal activity. Formerly, MPs appointed to the cabinet were expected to resign their seats, though this practice ceased in 1931. In each case, a vacancy may be filled by a by-election in the appropriate electoral district. The first-past-the-post system is used in by-elections, as in general elections.

== Roles and procedures ==
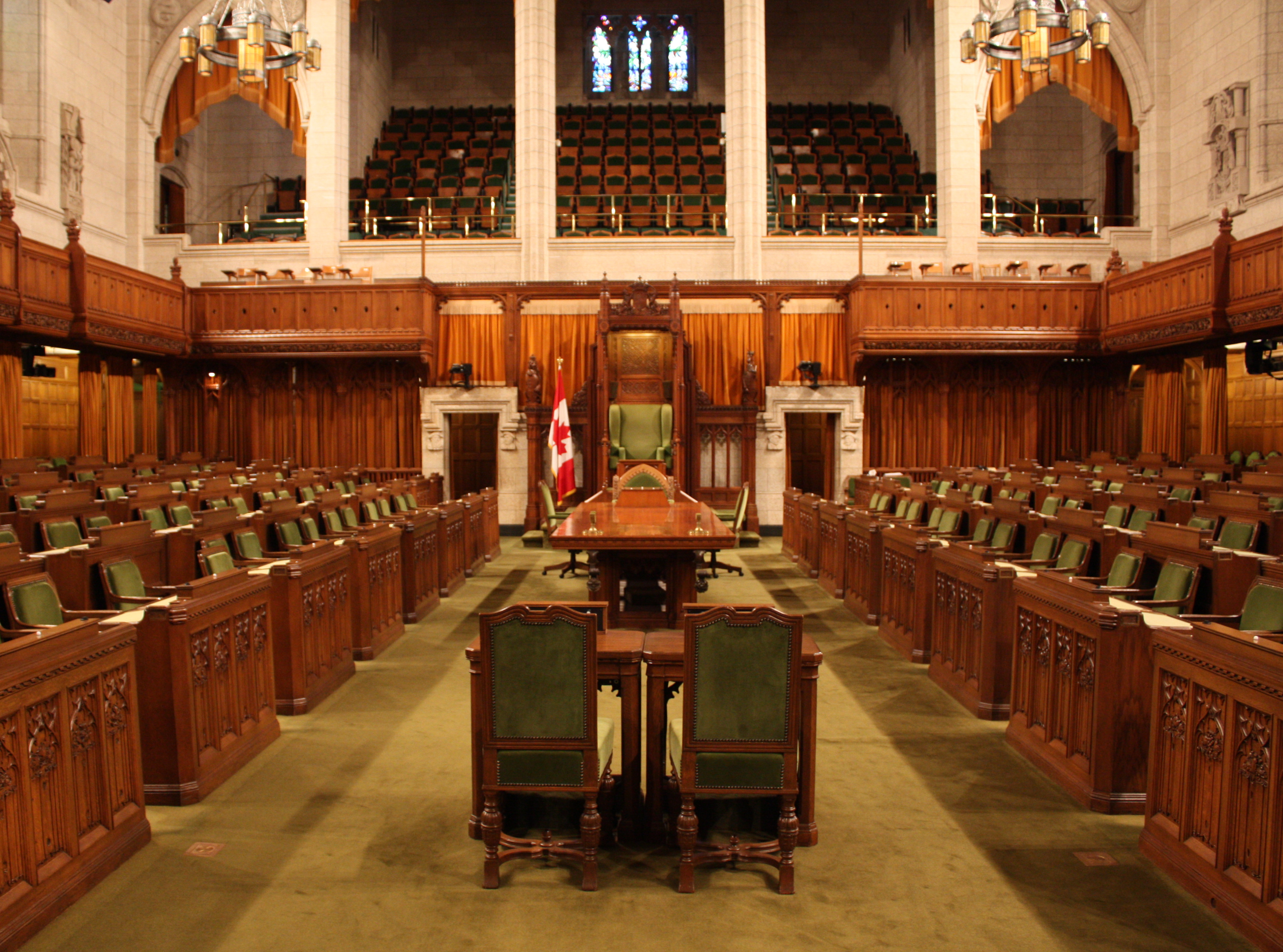
The chamber of the House of Commons; the speaker's chair is at the rear and centre in the room.

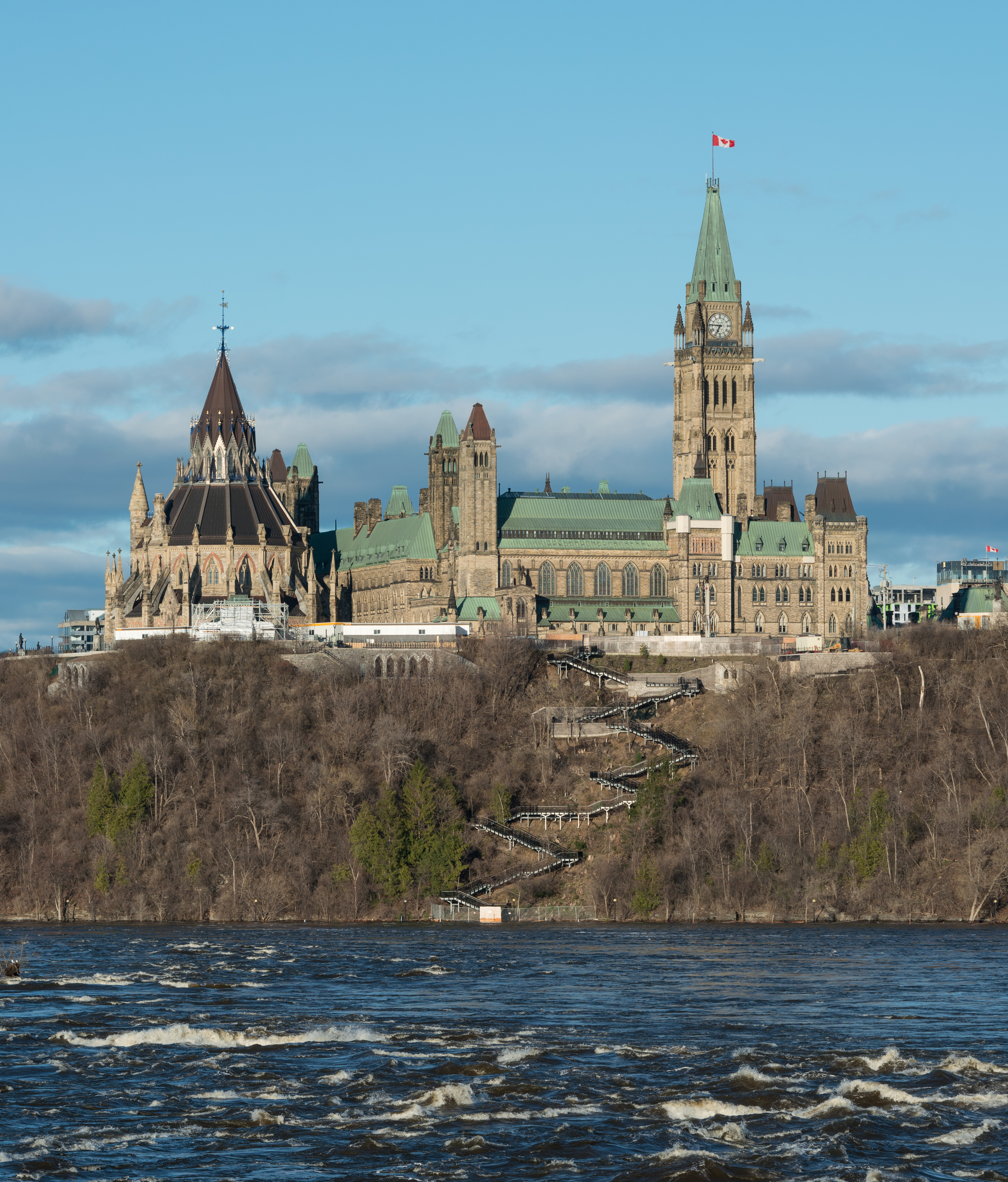
The Centre Block in Ottawa, where the House of Commons met until December 13, 2018.

Though it does not formally elect the prime minister, the House of Commons indirectly controls who becomes prime minister. By convention, the prime minister is answerable to and must maintain the support of the House of Commons. Thus, whenever the office of prime minister falls vacant, the governor general has the duty of appointing the person most likely to command the support of the House—normally the leader of the largest party in the lower house, although the system allows a coalition of two or more parties. This has not happened in the Canadian federal parliament but has occurred in Canadian provinces. The leader of the second-largest party (or in the case of a coalition, the largest party out of government) usually becomes the leader of the Official Opposition. Moreover, the prime minister is, by unwritten convention, a member of the House of Commons, rather than of the Senate. Only two prime ministers governed from the Senate: Sir John Abbott (1891–1892) and Sir Mackenzie Bowell (1894–1896). Both men got the job following the death of a prime minister and did not contest elections.

=== Meeting times and procedures ===
The House usually sits Monday to Friday from late January to mid-June and from mid-September to mid-December according to an established calendar, though it can modify the calendar if additional or fewer sittings are required. During these periods, the House generally rises for one week per month to allow members to work in their constituencies. Sittings of the House are open to the public. Proceedings are broadcast over cable and satellite television and over live streaming video on the Internet by CPAC owned by a consortium of Canadian cable companies. They are also recorded in text form in print and online in Hansard, the official report of parliamentary debates.

The Constitution Act, 1867 establishes a quorum of twenty members (including the member presiding) for the House of Commons. Any member may request a count of the members to ascertain the presence of a quorum; if, however, the speaker feels that at least twenty members are clearly in the Chamber, the request may be denied. If a count does occur and reveals that fewer than twenty members are present, the speaker orders bells to be rung, so that other members in the parliamentary precinct may come to the Chamber. If, after a second count, a quorum is still not present, the speaker must adjourn the House until the next sitting day.

The member of the government responsible for steering legislation through the House is the leader of the Government in the House of Commons. The government house leader (as they are more commonly known) is a member of Parliament selected by the prime minister and holds cabinet rank. The leader manages the schedule of the House of Commons and attempts to secure the Opposition's support for the Government's legislative agenda.

=== Question period ===
The House of Commons scrutinizes the ministers of the Crown through Question Period, a daily forty-five-minute period during which members have the opportunity to ask questions of the prime minister and other Cabinet ministers. Questions must relate to the responding minister's official government activities, not to their activities as a party leader or as a private Member of Parliament. Members may also question committee chairmen on the work of their respective committees. Members of each party are entitled to a number of questions proportional to the strength of their party's caucus in the House. In addition to questions asked orally during Question Period, Members of Parliament may also make inquiries in writing.

Under a majority government, scrutiny of the government by the House of Commons can be limited. Since elections use the first-past-the-post electoral system, the governing party tends to enjoy a large majority in the Commons; there is often limited need to compromise with other parties. (Minority governments, however, are not uncommon.) Canadian political parties generally maintain strong caucus discipline, leaving relatively little room for MPs to vote independently. In many cases, MPs may be expelled from their parties for voting against the instructions of party leaders. As well, the major parties require candidates' nominations to be signed by party leaders, giving party leaders considerable influence over a politician's career. Thus, defeats of majority governments on issues of confidence are very rare. Paul Martin's Liberal minority government lost a vote of no confidence in 2005; the last time this had occurred was in 1979, when Joe Clark's Progressive Conservative minority government was defeated after a term of just six months.

=== Role in Federation ===
In Canada's Westminster-modelled democracy, the Government of Canada, or more specifically the Governor-in-Council, exercises executive power on behalf of the prime minister and Cabinet and has a complementary relationship with the House of Commons, similar to the UK model rather than the US model of separation of powers.

The prime minister stays in office by retaining the confidence of the House of Commons. The lower house may indicate its lack of support for the ruling party administration by rejecting a motion of confidence, or by passing a motion of no confidence. Important bills that form a part of the government's agenda are generally considered matters of confidence, as is any taxation or spending bill and the annual budget. When a government has lost the confidence of the House of Commons, the prime minister is obliged to either resign or request the governor general to dissolve parliament, thereby precipitating a general election. The governor general may theoretically refuse to dissolve parliament, thereby forcing the prime minister to resign. The last instance of a governor general refusing to grant a dissolution was in 1926.

In modern times, the Government of Canada has strengthened its relationship with First Nations groups in Canada in place of the Crown.

=== Dissolution of term ===
Except when compelled to request a dissolution by an adverse vote on a confidence issue, the prime minister is allowed to choose the timing of dissolutions, and consequently the timing of general elections. The timing often reflects political considerations that favour the prime minister's party. However, no parliamentary term can last for more than five years from the first sitting of Parliament; a dissolution is automatic upon the expiry of this period. Normally, Parliaments do not last for full five-year terms; prime ministers typically ask for dissolutions after about three or four years. In 2006, the Harper government introduced a bill to set fixed election dates every four years, although snap elections are still permitted. The bill was approved by Parliament and has now become law.

Whatever the reason—the expiry of parliament's term, the choice of the prime minister, or a government defeat in the House of Commons—a dissolution is followed by general elections. If the prime minister's party retains its majority in the House of Commons, then the prime minister may remain in power. On the other hand, if their party has lost its majority, the prime minister may resign or may attempt to retain leadership by winning support from members of other parties. A prime minister may resign even without being defeated at the polls (for example, for personal health reasons). If the prime minister resigns, the new leader of the outgoing prime minister's party becomes prime minister.

=== Legislative functions ===
Although legislation may be introduced in either chamber, most bills originate in the House of Commons.

In conformity with the British model, the lower house alone is authorized to originate bills imposing taxes or appropriating public funds. This restriction on the power of the Senate is not merely a matter of convention, but is explicitly stated in the Constitution Act, 1867. Otherwise, the power of the two Houses of Parliament is theoretically equal; the approval of each is necessary for a bill's passage.

In practice, however, the House of Commons is the dominant chamber of Parliament, with the Senate very rarely exercising its powers in a way that opposes the will of the democratically elected chamber. The last major bill defeated in the Senate came in 2010, when a bill passed by the Commons concerning climate change was rejected in the Senate.

A clause in the Constitution Act, 1867 permits the governor general (with the approval of the monarch) to appoint up to eight extra senators to resolve a deadlock between the two houses. The clause was invoked only once, in 1990, when Prime Minister Brian Mulroney advised the appointment of an additional eight senators to secure the Senate's approval for the Goods and Services Tax.

=== Debates ===
During debates, members may only speak if called upon by the speaker (or, as is most often the case, a deputy presiding officer). The speaker is responsible for ensuring that members of all parties have an opportunity to be heard. The speaker also determines who is to speak if two or more members rise simultaneously, but the decision may be altered by the House. Motions must be moved by one member and seconded by another before debate may begin. Some motions, however, are non-debatable.

Speeches may be made in either of Canada's official languages (English and French), and it is customary for bilingual members of Parliament to respond in the same language. It is common for bilingual MPs to switch between languages during speeches. Members must address their speeches to the presiding officer, not the House, using the words "Mr. Speaker" (French: Monsieur le Président) or "Madam Speaker" (French: Madame la Présidente). Other members must be referred to in the third person. Traditionally, members do not refer to each other by name, but by constituency or cabinet post, using forms such as "the honourable member for [electoral district]" or "the minister of..." Members' names are routinely used only during roll call votes, in which members stand and are named to have their vote recorded; at that point they are referred to by title (Ms. or Mr. for Anglophones and madame, mademoiselle, or monsieur for Francophones) and last name, except where members have the same or similar last names, at which point they would be listed by their name and riding ("M. Massé, Avignon—La Mitis—Matane—Matapédia; Mr. Masse, Windsor West....).

No member may speak more than once on the same question (except that the mover of a motion is entitled to make one speech at the beginning of the debate and another at the end). Moreover, tediously repetitive or irrelevant remarks are prohibited, as are written remarks read into the record (although this practice has become more common in modern debates). The speaker may order a member making such remarks to cease speaking. The Standing Orders of the House of Commons prescribe time limits for speeches. The limits depend on the nature of the motion but are most commonly between ten and twenty minutes. However, under certain circumstances, the prime minister, the Opposition leader, and others are entitled to make longer speeches. The debate may be further restricted by the passage of "time allocation" motions. Alternatively, the House may end debate more quickly by passing a motion for "closure".

=== Member roll-call ===
When the debate concludes, the motion in question is put to a vote. The House first votes by voice vote; the presiding officer puts the question, and members respond either "yea" (in favour of the motion) or "nay" (against the motion). The presiding officer then announces the result of the voice vote, but five or more members may challenge the assessment, thereby forcing a recorded vote (known as a division, although, in fact, the House does not divide for votes the way the British House of Commons does). First, members in favour of the motion rise, so that the clerks may record their names and votes. Then, the same procedure is repeated for members who oppose the motion. There are no formal means for recording an abstention, though a member may informally abstain by remaining seated during the division. If there is an equality of votes, the speaker has a casting vote.

The member of the government responsible for steering legislation through the House is the leader of the Government in the House of Commons. The government house leader (as they are more commonly known) is a member of Parliament selected by the prime minister and holds cabinet rank. The leader manages the schedule of the House of Commons and attempts to secure the Opposition's support for the Government's legislative agenda.

The outcome of most votes is largely known beforehand since political parties in Cabinet normally instruct members on how to vote. A party normally entrusts some members of Parliament, known as whips, with the task of ensuring that all party members vote as desired. Members of Parliament do not tend to vote against such instructions since those who do so are unlikely to reach higher political ranks in their parties. Members who disregard party instructions may be deselected as official party candidates during future elections, and, in serious cases, may be expelled from their parties outright. Thus, members of Parliament may have limited independence, and "backbench rebellions" by members who oppose their party's policies are rare. In some circumstances, however, parties announce "free votes", allowing members to vote as they please. This may be done on moral issues and is routine on private members' bills.

=== Points of order ===
The speaker controls debates by calling on members to speak. If a member in the house believes that a rule (or standing order) has been breached, they may raise a "point of order", on which the speaker makes a ruling that is not subject to any debate or appeal. The speaker may also discipline members who fail to observe the rules of the House. When presiding, the speaker must remain impartial. The speaker also oversees the administration of the House and is chair of the Board of Internal Economy, the governing body for the House of Commons. The current speaker of the House of Commons is Francis Scarpaleggia.

== Symbols ==
The Commons' mace resembles a medieval mace used as a weapon, but is made of brass and decorated with elaborate symbolism. At its bulbous head is a replica of the Imperial State Crown; the choice of this crown for the Commons' mace differentiates it from the Senate's mace, which has St. Edward's Crown at its apex. The Commons mace is placed upon the table in front of the speaker for the duration of the sitting with the crown pointing towards the prime minister and the other cabinet ministers, who advise the monarch and governor general and are accountable to this chamber (in the Senate chamber, the mace points towards the throne, where the King may sit).

Carved above the speaker's chair is the royal arms of the United Kingdom. This chair was a gift from the United Kingdom Branch of the Empire Parliamentary Association in 1921, to replace the chair that was destroyed by the fire of 1916, and was a replica of the chair in the British House of Commons at the time. These arms at its apex were considered the royal arms for general purposes throughout the British Empire at the time. Since 1931, however, Canada has been an independent country and the Canadian coat of arms are now understood to be the royal arms of the monarch. Escutcheons of the same original royal arms can be found on each side of the speaker's chair held by a lion and a unicorn.

Bruce Hicks campaigned to Canadianize symbols of royal authority and strengthen the identity of parliamentary institutions. The proposal was supported by House of Commons speakers John Fraser and Gilbert Parent. Following a motion by MP Derek Lee, a Commons committee was struck. Hicks and Robert Watt, the first chief herald of Canada, were called as its only two expert witnesses, while Senator Serge Joyal joined the committee on behalf of the Senate. Commons' speaker Peter Milliken then asked the governor general to authorize such a symbol. In the United Kingdom, the House of Commons and the House of Lords use the royal badge of the portcullis, in green and red respectively, to represent those institutions and to distinguish them from the government, the courts and the monarch. The Canadian Heraldic Authority on April 15, 2008, granted the House of Commons, as an institution, a badge consisting of the chamber's mace (as described above) behind the escutcheon of the shield of the royal arms of Canada (representing the monarch, in whose name the House of Commons deliberates).

== Chamber and building characteristics ==
=== Chamber design ===
The current and original Canadian House of Commons chambers were influenced by the British House of Commons rectangular layout and that of the original St Stephen's Chapel in the Palace of Westminster. Unlike the British Commons, the Canadian chamber has individual chairs and tables for members.

With the exception of the legislatures in Nunavut (circular seating), the Northwest Territories (circular seating), and Manitoba (U-shaped seating), all other Canadian provincial legislatures share the common design of the Canadian House of Commons.

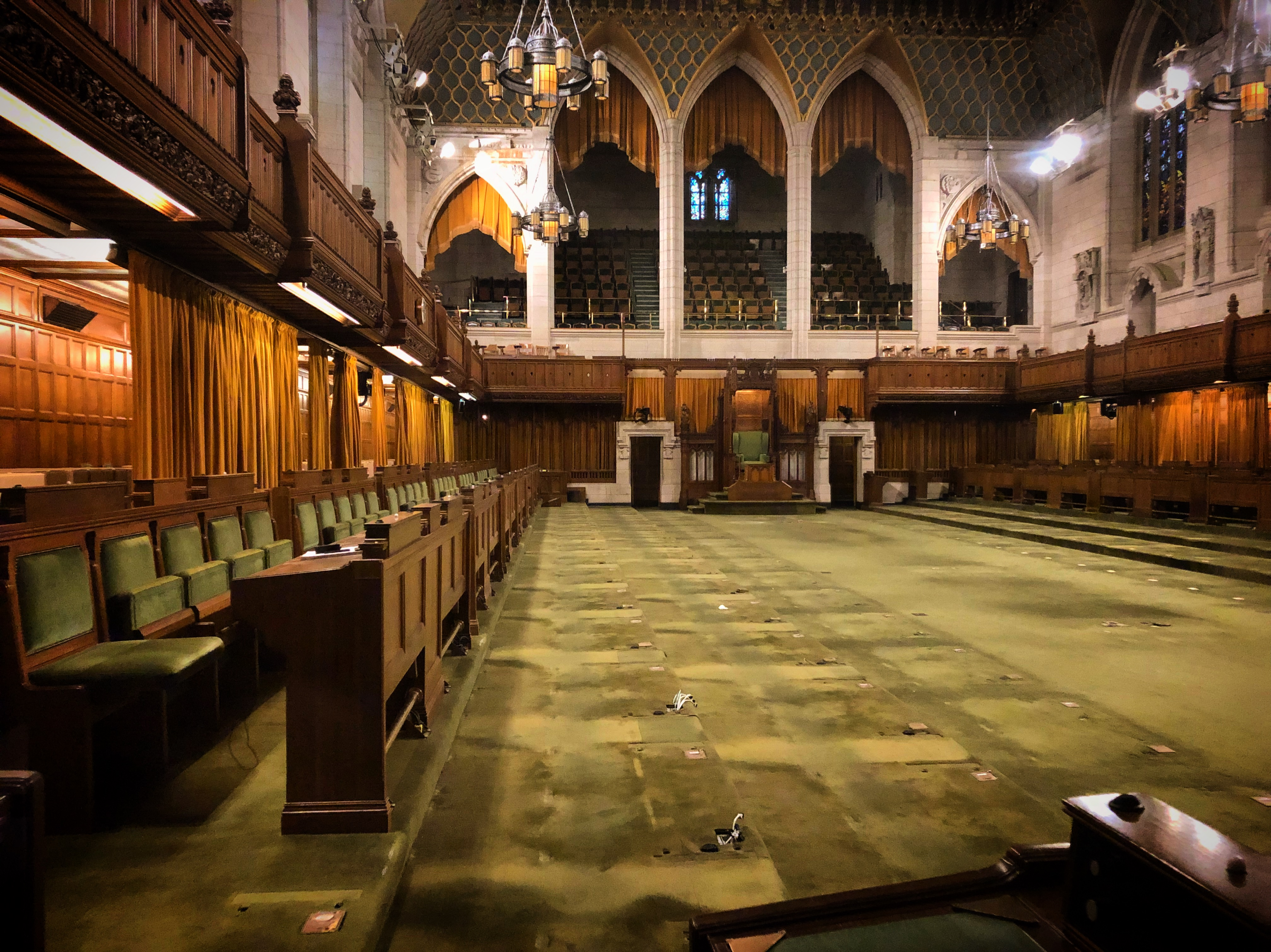
House of Commons Chamber after desks were removed for renovations, December 2018.

The Department of Public Works and Government Services undertook work during the 41st Parliament to determine how the seating arrangement could be modified to accommodate the additional 30 seats added in the 2015 election. Ultimately, new "theatre" seats were designed, with five fold-down seats in a row at one desk. Such seat sets now form almost the entire length of the last two rows on each side of the chamber.

=== Seating plan ===
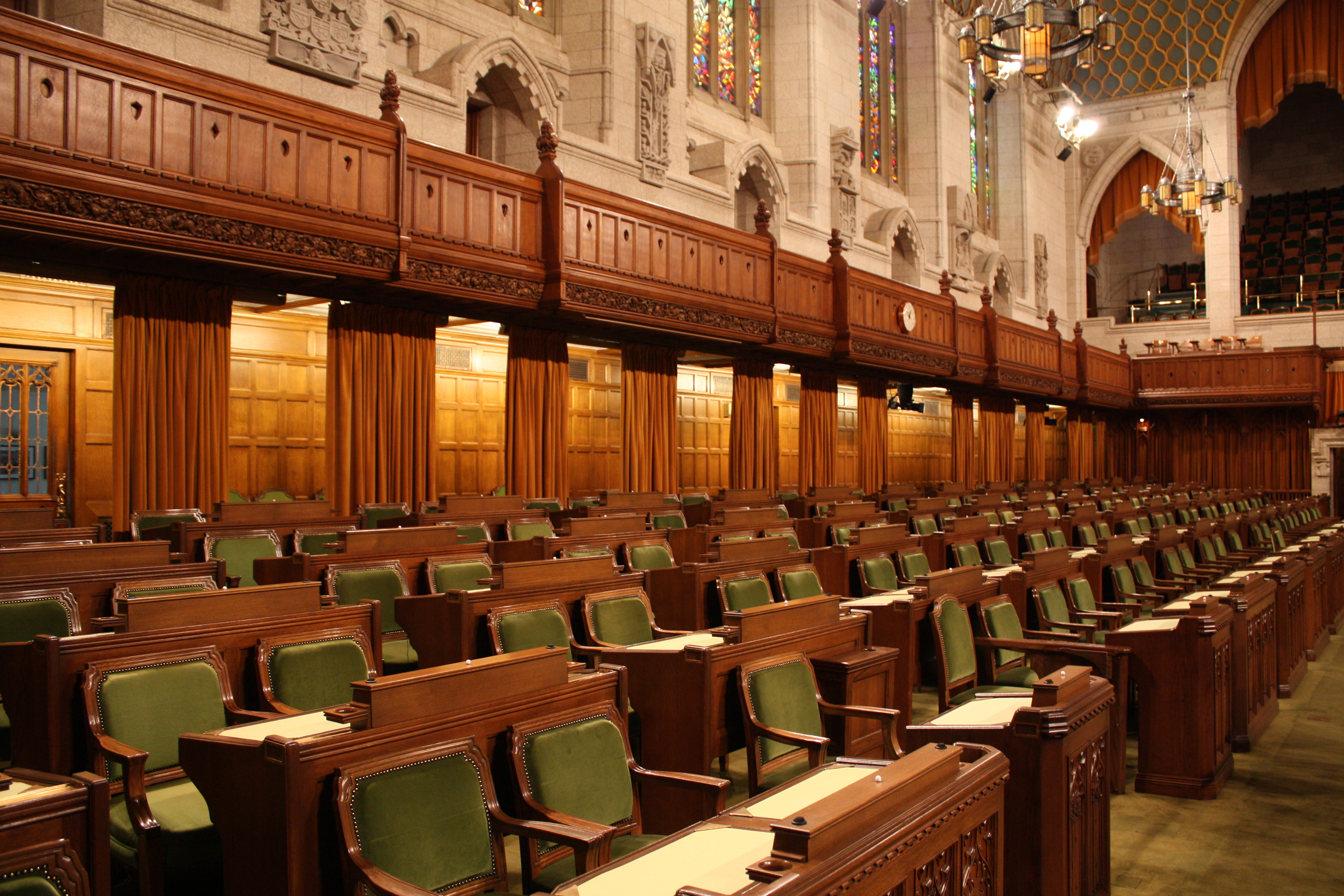
The governing party sits to the Speaker's right in the House of Commons.

Like the Senate, the House of Commons meets on Parliament Hill in Ottawa. The Commons Chamber is modestly decorated in green, in contrast with the more lavishly furnished red Senate Chamber. The arrangement is similar to the design of the Chamber of the British House of Commons. The seats are evenly divided between both sides of the Chamber, three sword-lengths apart (about three metres). The speaker's chair (which can be adjusted for height) is at the north end of the Chamber. In front of it is the Table of the House, on which rests the ceremonial mace. Various "table officers"—clerks and other officials—sit at the table, ready to advise the speaker on procedure when necessary. Members of the Government sit on the benches on the speaker's right, while members of the Opposition occupy the benches on the speaker's left. Government ministers sit around the prime minister, who is traditionally assigned the 11th seat in the front row on the speaker's right-hand side. The leader of the Official Opposition sits directly across from the prime minister and is surrounded by a Shadow Cabinet or critics for the government portfolios. The remaining party leaders sit in the front rows. Other members of Parliament who do not hold any kind of special responsibilities are known as "backbenchers".

Seating plan for the current House of Commons:

- Party leaders are italicized. Bold indicates cabinet ministers.

Kmiec	Nater	Dawson	Aman. Gill	Amar. Gill	D. Gill	S. Gill	Guglielmin	Holman	Jackson	Konanz	Mahal	Ruff	McKenzie	Rowe	Stevenson	Strauss	Kram	Vacant	Vacant	Vacant			May	Vacant	Gazan	Johns
C. Lewis	Dowdall	Patzer	Jivani	Waugh	Williamson	Epp	Diotte	Dalton	Leslie	T. Falk	Cody	Kirkland	Malette	Reynolds	Anderson	Au	Bailey	Bélanger	Bexte	Bonk	Borrelli	F. Davies	Vacant	Vacant	Kwan	D. Davies	McPherson
Morrison	Arnold	Steinley	Lefebvre	Gallant	Reid	Hoback	Allison	Viersen	Motz	Kuruc	Kibble	H. Gill	McCauley	Menegakis	Baber	Ho	Kronis	R. Falk	Groleau	G. McLean	Tolmie	Mantle	Goodridge	Plamondon	Barsalou-Duval	Blanchette-Joncas	Lemire
Tochor	Kelly	Généreux	Gourde	Lloyd	van Popta	Jansen	Zimmer	Lobb	Baldinelli	Davidson	Melillo	Calkins	Redekopp	Muys	Aboultaif	Cobena	Lawton	Hardy	Roberts	Vis	DeRidder	Bragdon	Shipley	Beaulieu	Ste-Marie	Larouche	DeBellefeuille	Gaudreau
Lake	Caputo	Richards	Aitchison	Mazier	Small	Strahl	Genuis	Brassard	Moore	Berthold	Rood	Warkentin	Kramp-Neuman	Khanna	Anstey	Morin	Ross	Vien	Godin	Duncan	Majumdar	Cooper	Gunn	Lawrence	Champoux	Perron	Deschênes	M. Gill	Bonin
		Doherty	Schmale	Barrett	Bezan	Albas	Rempel Garner	Deltell	Chong	Scheer	Uppal	Poilievre	Lantsman	Paul-Hus	L. Lewis	Dancho	Barlow	Seeback	Chambers	Thomas	Hallan	Kusie	Stubbs	Block	Garon	Blanchet	Normandin	Brunelle-Duceppe	Simard	Fortin	Thériault
Scarpaleggia
		**Ali**	**Diab**	**MacDonald**	**McGuinty**	**Lightbound**	**Robertson**	**Dabrusin**	**LeBlanc**	**Joly**	**MacKinnon**	**Carney**	**Champagne**	**Thompson**	**Hodgson**	**Anandasangaree**	**Hajdu**	**Michel**	**Fraser**	**Miller**	**M. Sidhu**	**Olszewski**	**Solomon**	**Valdez**	Duclos	Hussen	Gould	Petitpas Taylor	Chagger	Jaczek	Beech
Fry	Sgro	Osborne	Fragiskatos	**Fuhr**	**van Koeverden**	**Gainey**	**Provost**	**Sahota**	**Belanger**	**McKnight**	**Chartrand**	Gerretsen	**Anand**	**Alty**	**Gull-Masty**	**Sarai**	**S. McLean**	**Long**	**Zerucelli**	Chenette	Lattanzio	Naqvi	Housefather	Noormohamed	Ménard	Duguid	Fisher	Dhaliwal	Bittle
Cormier	Dhillon	Dzerowicz	El-Khoury	Chatel	Romanado	Louis	Ehsassi	Grant	Leitão	Bardeesy	Kayabaga	Lamoureux	Brière	Turnbull	Kelloway	Guay	Hogan	Koutrakis	Chi	Myles	Fergus	Fonseca	Gladu	Iacono	Jeneroux	Khalid	Lauzon	Maloney
McKinnon	Morrissey	Schiefke	Sheehan	Sudds	Desrochers	McKelvie	Gasparro	Hanley	Rochefort	Casey	Blois	Bendayan	Fortier	Oliphant	Battiste	Klassen	Lavack	Ramsay	Church	S. Sidhu	Vandenbeld	Zahid	Lambropoulos	Yip	Baker	d'Entremont	Lalonde
Powlowski	Weiler	Zuberi	Eyolfson	L. Lapointe	Bains	Coteau	Gaheer	Hepfner	Idlout	V. Lapointe	Sousa	Carr	Acan	Al Soud	Auguste	Chang	Clark	Connors	Dandurand	Danko	Deschênes-Thériault	Earle	Fancy-Landry	Fanjoy	Greaves	Harrison	Hirtle
Mendès	Joseph	Lavoie	Ma	MacDonald	Malette	Miedema	Mingarelli	Nathan	Nguyen	Ntumba	O'Rourke	Rana	Royer	Saini	Sari	Sawatzky	Sodhi	St-Pierre	Tesser Derksen	Villeneuve	Watchorn	Begum	Martin	Caley	Gobeil	Shahnawaz

=== Members' offices ===
Some MPs have offices off Parliament Hill in the Justice Building or Confederation Building on Wellington Street near the Supreme Court.

=== Renovations ===
The Centre Block chamber is undergoing an estimated decade-long restoration and renovation, which began in December 2018. Parliamentarians have relocated to the courtyard of the West Block, which also underwent seven years of renovations and repairs to get ready for the move. Prime Minister Justin Trudeau marked the closing of the Centre Block on December 12, 2018. The final sittings of both the House of Commons and the Senate in Centre Block took place on December 13, 2018.

== See also ==
Parties and elections

- Elections Canada
- List of Canadian federal electoral districts
- List of Canadian federal general elections
- List of political parties in Canada

Parliaments and members

- List of Canadian federal parliaments
- Procedural officers and senior officials of the Parliament of Canada
- Senate of Canada
- Centre Block
- Joint Address

== Bibliography ==
- David E. Smith (2007). The people's House of Commons: theories of democracy in contention. University of Toronto Press. ISBN 978-0-8020-9465-0.
- Department of Justice. (2004). Constitution Acts, 1867 to 1982. Archived March 21, 2005, at the Wayback Machine
- Dawson, W F (1962). Procedure in the Canadian House of Commons. University of Toronto Press. ISBN 9780802070494. OCLC 502155. Also under OCLC 252298936.
- House of Commons Table Research Branch. (2006). Compendium of Procedure. Archived February 9, 2010, at the Wayback Machine
- The Parliament of Canada. Official Website. Archived May 14, 2017, at the Wayback Machine
- Canada's House of Commons from The Canadian Encyclopedia Archived September 24, 2017, at the Wayback Machine
- About parliament – House of Commons, Inter-Parliamentary Union
