= Preserving Provincial Representation in the House of Commons Act =

Canadian federal legislation

Parliament of Canada
- Long title: An Act to amend the Constitution Act, 1867 (electoral representation)
- Passed by: House of Commons of Canada
- Passed: June 15, 2022
- Passed by: Senate of Canada
- Passed: June 21, 2022
- Royal assent: June 23, 2022
- Commenced: June 23, 2022 (Note: The Act is silent as to its commencement date. The default rule for Canadian Acts of Parliament is that when an Act is silent it comes into force on the day it received Royal Assent.)

Legislative history

Initiating chamber: House of Commons of Canada
- Bill title: Bill C-14
- Introduced by: Minister of Intergovernmental Affairs, Infrastructure and Communities Dominic LeBlanc
- First reading: March 24, 2022
- Second reading: May 18, 2022
- Third reading: June 15, 2022
- Committee report

Revising chamber: Senate of Canada
- Bill title: Bill C-14
- Member(s) in charge: Representative of the Government in the Senate Marc Gold
- First reading: June 16, 2022
- Second reading: June 20, 2022
- Third reading: June 21, 2022

Amends
- Constitution Act, 1867; Electoral Boundaries Readjustment Act

Related legislation
- Fair Representation Act
- Status: Current legislation

The Preserving Provincial Representation in the House of Commons Act (French: Loi sur le maintien de la représentation des provinces à la Chambre des communes), also referred to as Bill C-14, is an act of the Parliament of Canada that was passed by the 44th Canadian Parliament in 2022. It made a section 44 amendment to the Constitution of Canada to guarantee that the province of Quebec would not lose a seat in the 2022 Canadian federal electoral redistribution. The bill was introduced as Bill C-14 with the long title An Act to amend the Constitution Act, 1867 (electoral representation).

== Objectives ==
The act amended section 51 of the Constitution Act, 1867 to provide that, when the number of members of the House of Commons and the representation of the provinces in that House are readjusted on the completion of each decennial census, a province would not have fewer members assigned to it than were assigned during the 43rd Parliament (2019-2021). It also includes transitional measures providing for the application of that amendment to the readjustment of electoral boundaries under the Electoral Boundaries Readjustment Act following the 2021 decennial census. The act was introduced after a Bloc Québécois motion calling for government action to protect the number of seats assigned to Quebec after redistribution.

== Provisions ==
=== Constitutional Amendment (Sections 2 and 3) ===
The act amended the redistribution formula in Rule 2 of section 51(1) of the Constitution Act, 1867, commonly known as the grandfather clause. This rule was first put in place by the government of Brian Mulroney in 1985, guaranteeing that no province can be allocated a number of seats that is less than the number of seats it had in 1985. Bill C-14 alters the grandfather clause by amending it to be that no province can be allocated a number of seats that is less than the number of seats it had in the 43rd Canadian Parliament.

=== Changes to 2022 Redistribution Timeline (Sections 4-7) ===
With regards to the then ongoing 2022 Canadian federal electoral redistribution, while the act granted an extension for the Quebec commission to submit its final report should it require extra time due to the mid redistribution seat change, the commission did not use the extra time extension granted by the act, and submitted its final report on February 1, 2023, within the initial 12 months (ten months plus a two-month available extension) deadline for other commissions.
