= Electoral Boundaries Readjustment Act =

1964 act of the Parliament of Canada

Parliament of Canada
- Long title: An Act to provide for the establishment of electoral boundaries commissions to report on the readjustment of the representation of the provinces in the House of Commons and to provide for the readjustment of such representation in accordance therewith
- Citation: Electoral Boundaries Readjustment Act, R.S.C. 1985, c. E-3
- Passed by: House of Commons
- Passed: November 16, 1964
- Passed by: Senate
- Passed: November 20, 1964
- Royal assent: November 20, 1964
- Commenced: Partially on November 20, 1964 (Note: Section 32(1) of the Act as originally enacted prescribes that all sections except 29 to 31 came into force upon Royal Assent.); Fully on April 23, 1968 (Note: Section 32(2) of the Act as originally enacted prescribes that sections 29 to 31 came into force on the day the first representation order made under EBRA became effective. The first representation order made under EBRA in 1966 prescribed that it would come into effect upon the dissolution of the 27th Canadian Parliament. That dissolution occurred on April 23, 1968.)

Legislative history

First chamber: House of Commons
- Bill title: Bill C-72
- Introduced by: Prime Minister Lester B. Pearson
- First reading: March 2, 1964
- Second reading: April 15, 1964
- Third reading: November 16, 1964

Second chamber: Senate
- Bill title: Bill C-72
- Member(s) in charge: Leader of the Government in the Senate John Joseph Connolly
- First reading: November 18, 1964
- Second reading: November 19, 1964
- Third reading: November 20, 1964

Repeals
- Representation Act
- Status: Amended

The Electoral Boundaries Readjustment Act (French: Loi sur la révision des limites des circonscriptions électorales), commonly known by its acronym EBRA, is an act of the Parliament of Canada that was passed by the 26th Canadian Parliament in 1964.

Under the EBRA, every ten years, ten electoral boundaries commissions (one in each province) are established to revise the electoral district boundaries in their province. Each commission is composed of three members. It is chaired by a judge appointed by the chief justice of the province and has two other members appointed by the Speaker of the House of Commons.

== Background ==
In the early years after Confederation, after each decennial census, the government would introduce a bill describing the boundaries of each electoral district and then have the bill adopted like any other piece of legislation. This was subject to criticism as being a highly biased task focused on maximizing the governing party's electoral successes, often referred to as “gerrymandering”. In 1903, Prime Minister Wilfrid Laurier altered this procedure by placing the readjustment of boundaries in the hands of a special committee of the House of Commons on which MPs from all parties were represented. Each time a redistribution of seats was scheduled to occur under the Constitution Act, 1867, the government brought in a bill which did not contain any details about the boundaries of the various ridings. After the bill was read a second time, it was referred to a special committee instructed to “prepare schedules to contain and describe the several electoral divisions entitled to return Members to this House”.

== Passage ==
Even before Canadian Confederation, suggestions had been made to place the drawing of electoral boundaries into the hands of an impartial body and not with Partisan MPs. This continued to be a concern after Confederation and, on a number of occasions, it was recommended that the process be placed instead into the hands of judges.

=== Diefenbaker Government ===
In 1962, Prime Minister John Diefenbaker proposed a motion that called for a 5 Member national electoral boundaries commission, composed of 4 superior court judges, and the electoral commissioner. With Parliamentary approval required before the commission's electoral districts became effective. The Motion Passed, and a bill to that effect was introduced, but died on the order paper when parliament was dissolved for the 1962 election.

During the short 25th Canadian Parliament, no progress was made on the subject.

=== Pearson Government ===
Following the Liberal Party victory in the 1963 election, on November 26, 1963 Secretary of State Jack Pickersgill introduced a new motion, which prepared the way for a bill to provide for the establishment of electoral boundaries commissions.

In accordance with the motion, Prime Minister Pearson introduced the Electoral Boundaries Readjustment Act, the bill took a full year to get through Parliament, with prolonged delays because of disagreements over its major clauses.

== Provisions ==
=== Appointment of Electoral Boundaries Commissions ===
As soon as possible after the completion of each decennial census, the Chief Statistician of Canada prepares and sends the relevant population figures to the Chief Electoral Officer. The Chief Electoral Officer then calculates the total number of House of Commons seats and their distribution among the provinces. After the Chief Electoral Officer has this information published in the Canada Gazette, the process of appointing the members of each commission begins.

An electoral boundaries commission is established for each province by the government within 60 days of the government receiving the population figures or within six months of the first day of the month fixed for the taking of the census, whichever is earlier. No commission is appointed for Yukon, the Northwest Territories or Nunavut, as these territories only have one seat each. Each commission consists of a chairperson, normally a provincial superior court judge who is appointed by the chief justice of the province, and two other individuals appointed by the Speaker of the House of Commons. No sitting member of the Senate or of the House of Commons or of a provincial legislature can be appointed to a commission.

As soon as the electoral boundaries commissions have been established, the Chief Electoral Officer provides each chairperson with the relevant population figures. Each commission has up to 10 months from the date it receives this return to recommend constituency boundaries in a report to the Chief Electoral Officer.

=== Drawing of Boundaries ===
Each commission is required to draw constituency boundaries in such a way that the population of each constituency is as close as possible to the quotient obtained by dividing the provincial population as determined by the census by the new number of seats allocated to the province. No constituency is permitted to have a population smaller than 75% of the quotient or greater than 125%, although in extraordinary circumstances a commission may exceed these limits.

As soon as possible, each commission prepares a proposal for the number of seats, the boundaries of the electoral districts and the names of those districts. Each proposal is accompanied by a notice inviting electors and Members of the House of Commons to one or more public meetings.

Following the hearings, each commission reviews its proposals, prepares a report and transmits it to the Chief Electoral Officer before the end of the 10-month period. The Chief Electoral Officer transmits a copy of each report to the Speaker of the House of Commons as soon as the report is received. The Speaker tables these reports in the House and ensures that they are referred to a committee designated to deal with electoral matters.

=== Consideration by the House ===
Members have 30 days following the tabling or publication of the reports to file an objection in writing with the clerk of the committee to which the matter was referred. Members must specify the provisions objected to in the reports and the reasons for their objection. These representations are made in the form of a motion signed by at least 10 Members. Following the filing deadline, the committee has 30 sitting days to review the Members’ representations. At the conclusion of its consideration of the reports and the objections, the committee returns the reports to the Speaker of the House. The Speaker then immediately sends the reports and attached documents to the Chief Electoral Officer for distribution, if necessary, to the various electoral boundaries commissions for reconsideration in light of the objections. No discussion of the reports or the objections takes place in the House.

The commissions must consider the objections within the following 30 days, but they are not compelled to make any changes as a result of the objections. Each commission then submits a final report, with or without amendment, to the Chief Electoral Officer, who forwards it to the Speaker of the House. Once tabled in the House by the Speaker, the commission's decision is final and without appeal.

=== Representation Order ===
After each commission has submitted its final report, the Chief Electoral Officer prepares a representation order. The representation order specifies the number of Members to be elected in each province, divides each province into electoral districts, describes the boundaries of each district, and specifies the population of and the name to be given to each district. The new boundaries cannot be used at the time of an election unless at least seven months have passed between the date the representation order was proclaimed and the date that Parliament is dissolved for a general election.

== Redistributions under the EBRA ==
=== 1966, 1976 and 1987 Redistributions ===
In every decade between 1960 and 2000, Parliament adopted legislation either to temporarily suspend or to amend the redistribution process. After both the 1971 and 1981 censuses, the readjustment process was suspended to permit amendments to section 51 of the Constitution Act, 1867, setting out the formula for representation in the House and to make some changes to the readjustment process itself.

=== 1996 Redistribution ===
After an initial suspension of the process in 1992, in 1995 the government of Jean Chrétien proposed the Electoral Boundaries Readjustment Act, 1995. It proposed the repeal and re-enactment of the Electoral Boundaries Readjustment Act. The objective of the bill was to stop the ongoing redistribution plans and to start the process over again, allowing the next election to be held on the basis of the 1981 boundaries. The bill would have also brought about a redistribution every five years in provinces where the shift in population warranted it, a new triggering mechanism for holding a decennial redistribution which would have eliminated an unnecessary redistribution in provinces without a significant change in population, and parliamentary oversight of appointments to electoral boundaries commissions. However, while it was passed by both houses of parliament, it ended up being subject to a dispute over amendments between the House of Commons and Senate, and died on the order paper without receiving royal assent.

=== 2003 Redistribution ===
The 2003 redistribution was the first under the EBRA to go ahead on schedule. The effective date of a representation order was changed from 12 months after it is proclaimed to 7 months after it is proclaimed by an act of parliament to allow for the 2004 Canadian federal election to occur on the new map.

=== 2012 Redistribution ===
The 2012 redistribution was the second under the EBRA to not be temporarily suspended. This was primarily due to the Government of Stephen Harper having already previously passed an amendment to section 51 of the Constitution Act, 1867 through the Fair Representation Act before the process began. The act received royal assent on December 16, 2011, several months before the commissions were established on February 21, 2012, allowing the redistribution to go ahead on schedule.

=== 2022 Redistribution ===
In 2022, the government of Justin Trudeau passed the Preserving Provincial Representation in the House of Commons Act, that amended section 51 of the Constitution Act, 1867 to require that each province have no fewer seats than what they had in the 43rd Parliament (2019 - 2021). This was done to prevent Quebec from losing a seat in the House of Commons with the 2022 redistribution. Since the redistribution of the reduced Quebec seats was already underway, the bill re-started for the province of Quebec the 10-month deadline to recommend constituency boundaries, but did not change the schedule for any other provinces.
