= Fair Representation Act (Canada) =

Canadian law regulating district redistribution

Parliament of Canada
- Long title: An Act to amend the Constitution Act, 1867, the Electoral Boundaries Readjustment Act and the Canada Elections Act
- Citation: S.C. 2011, c. 26
- Considered by: House of Commons of Canada
- Considered by: Senate of Canada
- Assented to: December 16, 2011

Legislative history

First chamber: House of Commons of Canada
- Bill citation: Bill C-20
- Introduced by: Tim Uppal, Minister of State (Democratic Reform)
- First reading: October 27, 2011
- Second reading: November 3, 2011
- Third reading: December 13, 2011

Second chamber: Senate of Canada
- Member(s) in charge: Claude Carignan, Deputy Leader of the Government in the Senate
- First reading: December 13, 2011
- Second reading: December 13, 2011
- Third reading: December 16, 2011

Amends
- Constitution Act, 1867; Electoral Boundaries Readjustment Act; Canada Elections Act

Related legislation
- Preserving Provincial Representation in the House of Commons Act
- Status: Amended

The Fair Representation Act (French: Loi sur la représentation équitable) was an act of the Parliament of Canada and was passed by the 41st Canadian Parliament in 2011. The Act was introduced as Bill C-20 with the long title An Act to amend the Constitution Act, 1867, the Electoral Boundaries Readjustment Act and the Canada Elections Act.

The legislation amended the Constitution Act, 1867 and modified the redistribution process contained within it. Amendments affecting proportionate representation between the provinces, require support of seven provinces representing at least 50% of the population of Canada. Because the Fair Representation Act did not affect the proportionate representation of the provinces, it was passed without approval of the provinces. The legislation could be passed by the Parliament of Canada alone, under section 44 of the Constitution Act, 1982.

In 2012, the federal electoral redistribution was conducted using the amended formula introduced by the Fair Representation Act. It increased the number of MPs in the most populous provinces: Quebec gained three, Ontario gained 15, British Columbia gained six and Alberta gained six.

The 2022 federal electoral redistribution began under the formula created by the Act, but in March 2022 the House of Commons rejected the allocation it produced. As a result, the government introduced the Preserving Provincial Representation in the House of Commons Act. The Act received royal assent on June 23, 2022, further amending the representation formula.
