= Representation Act, 1985 =

Canadian federal legislation

Parliament of Canada
- Long title: An Act to amend the Constitution Act, 1867 and the Electoral Boundaries Readjustment Act and to provide for certain matters in relation to the 1981 decennial census
- Citation: S.C. 1986, c. 8
- Royal assent: March 4, 1986
- Status: Current legislation

The Representation Act, 1985 (French: Loi de 1985 sur la représentation électorale) is an act of the Parliament of Canada and was passed by the 33rd Canadian Parliament in 1985.

Included within the act is the Constitution Act, 1985 (Representation), it guaranteed that no province would drop below the number of seats it had in 1985.

The act was replaced by the Fair Representation Act in 2011.
