= Endorsements in the 2022 Conservative Party of Canada leadership election =

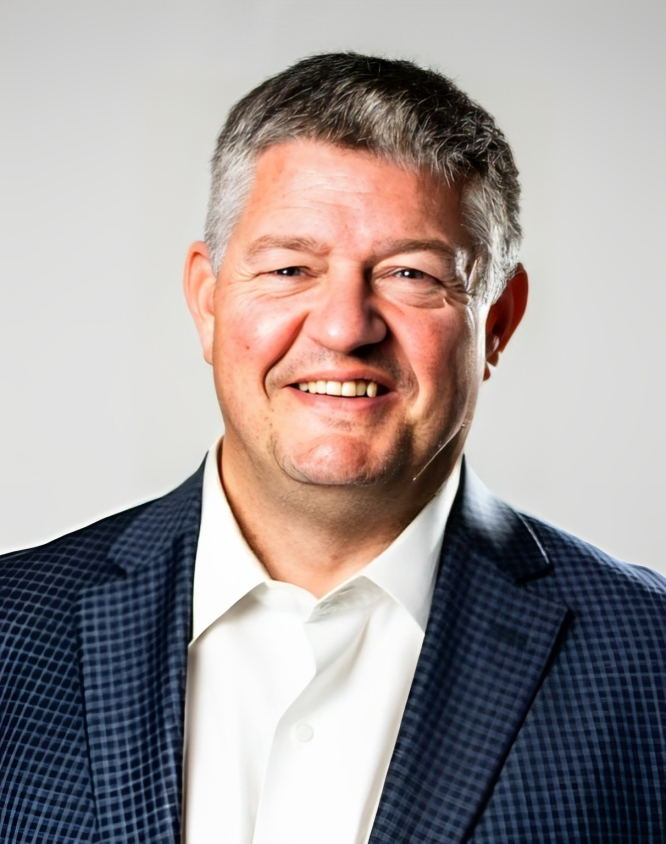
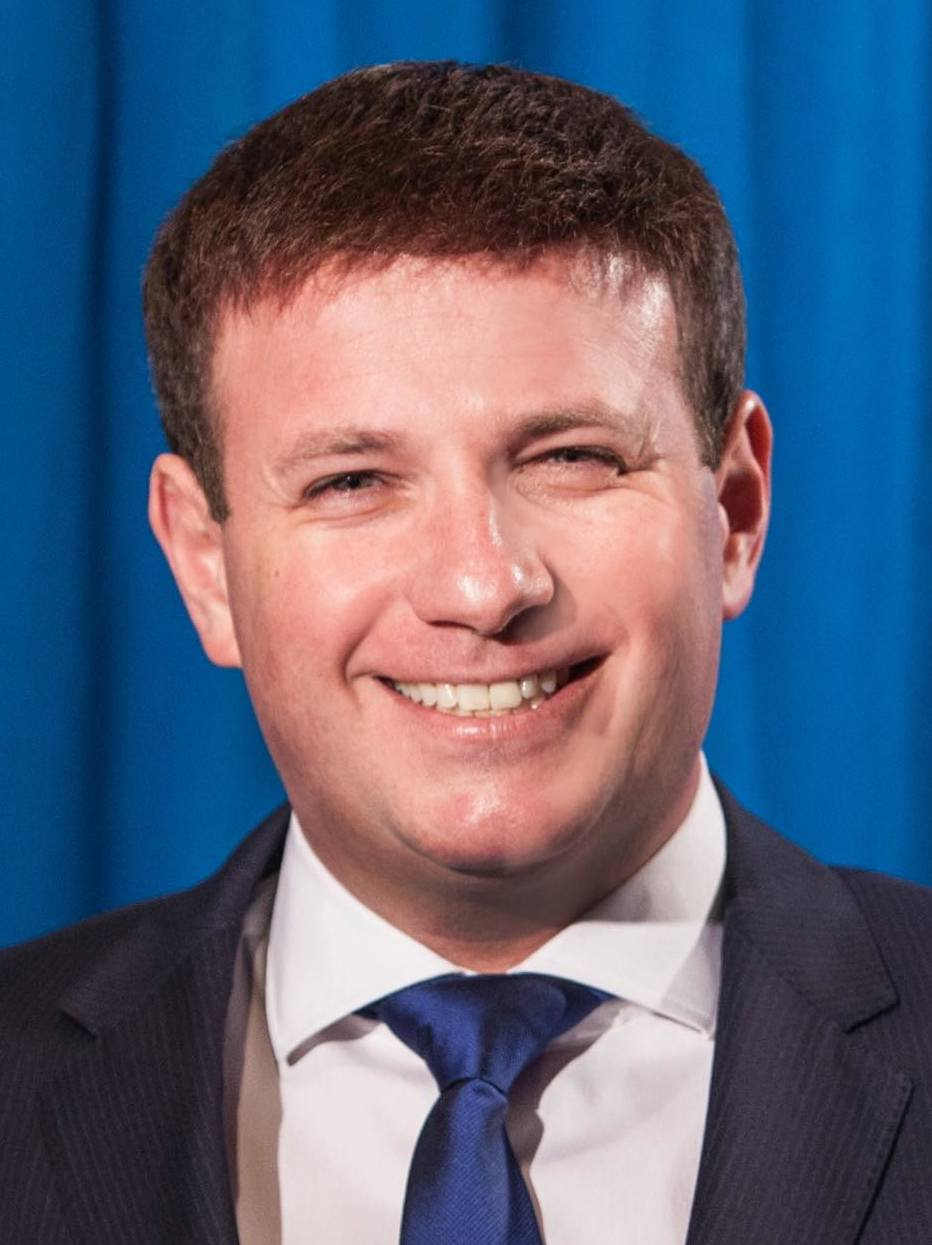
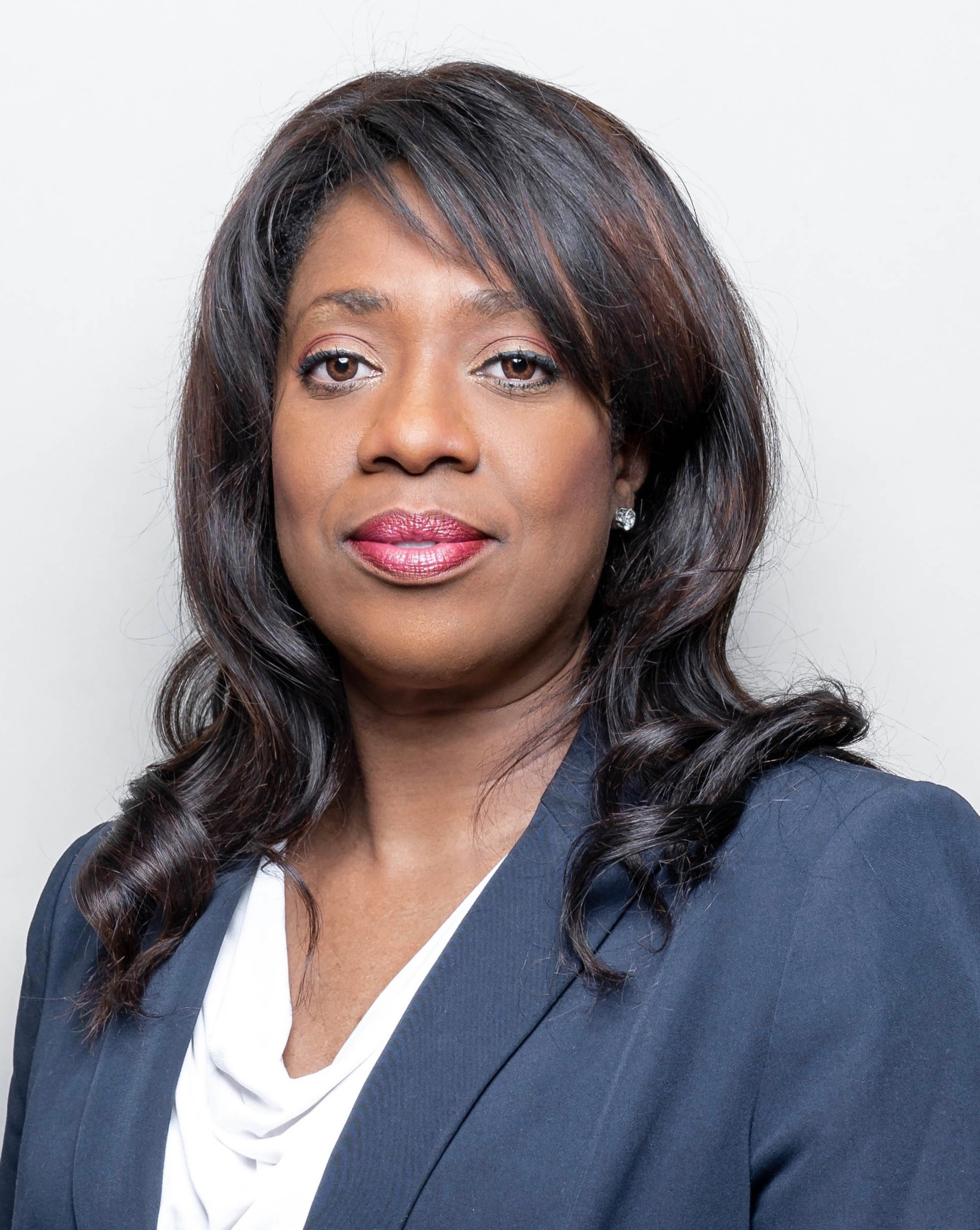
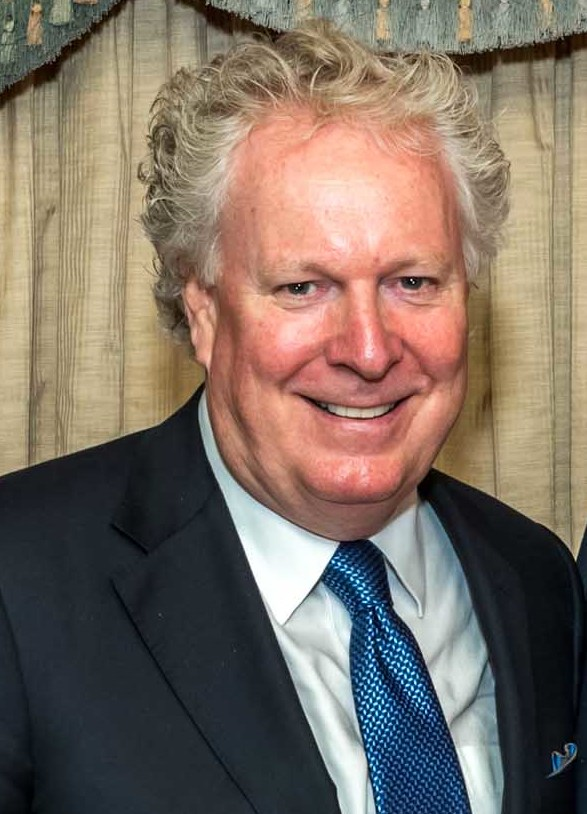
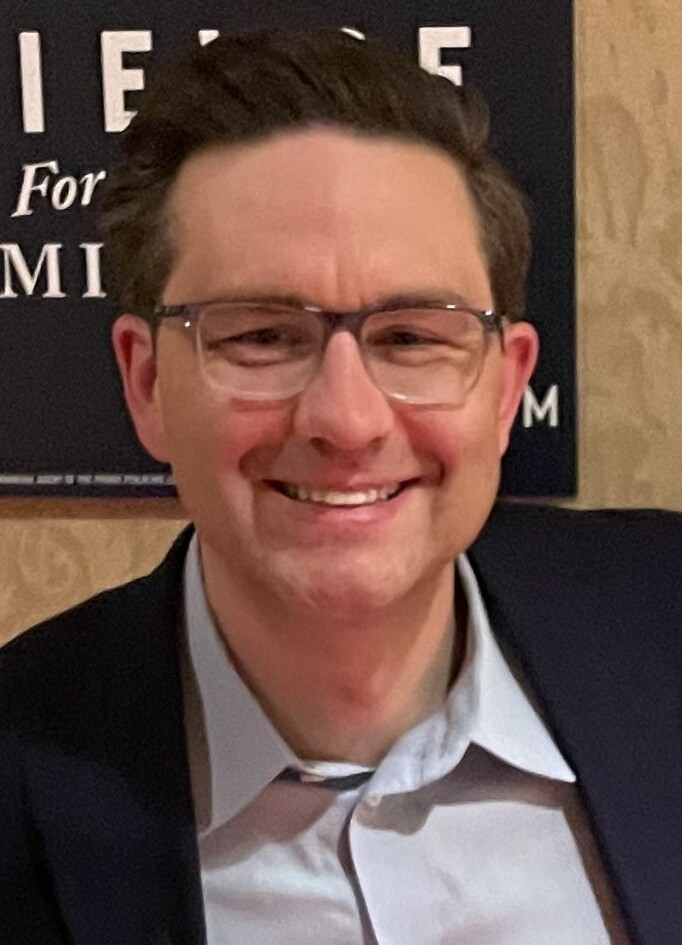
Candidates for the 2022 leadership election.
From left to right: Aitchison, Baber, Lewis, Charest, Poilievre.

The following lists contain the endorsements given to candidates in the 2022 Conservative Party of Canada leadership election.

== Endorsements ==
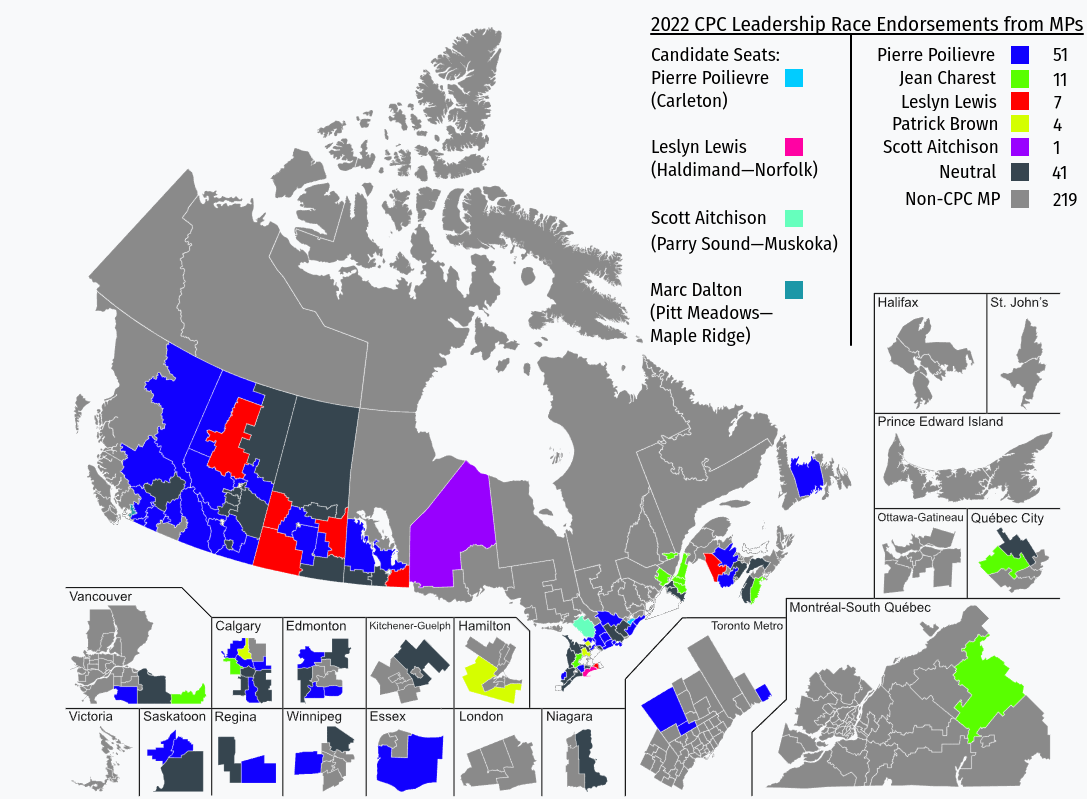
Map of endorsements from CPC MPs to candidates in the 2022 Conservative Party of Canada Leadership Election. As of April 11, 2022.

Candidate	Current politicians				Former politicians				Other prominent individuals	Organizations	Media	Total
Candidate	Members of Parliament	Senators	Provincial politicians	Municipal politicians	Former MPs	Former Senators	Former provincial politicians	Former municipal politicians	Other prominent individuals	Organizations	Media	Total
Verified candidates
Scott Aitchison	1	–	–	–	–	–	–	–	–	–	–	1
Roman Baber	–	–	–	–	1	–	–	–	–	–	–	1
Patrick Brown	1	2	1	1	3	1	–	–	–	–	–	9
Jean Charest	16	8	8	1	15	6	19	3	4	–	–	79
Leslyn Lewis	10	–	–	–	6	–	2	–	2	1	–	21
Pierre Poilievre	62	7	37	–	19	2	5	2	8	–	1	143
Failed to qualify
Grant Abraham	–	–	–	–	–	–	–	–	–	1	–	1
Leona Alleslev	–	–	–	–	–	–	1	–	–	–	–	1
Joseph Bourgault	–	–	–	–	1	–	–	–	1	1	–	3
Marc Dalton	–	–	–	–	–	–	–	–	–	1	–	1
Joel Etienne	–	–	–	–	–	–	–	–	–	–	–	0
Bobby Singh	–	–	–	–	–	–	–	–	–	–	–	0

== Summary of endorsements from caucus members by province ==
Candidate		BC	AB	SK	MB	ON	QC	NB	NS	NL	Total
Scott Aitchison	MPs:	0	0	0	0	1	0	0	0	0	1
Scott Aitchison	Senators:	0	-	0	0	0	0	0	0	0	0
Roman Baber	MPs:	0	0	0	0	0	0	0	0	0	0
Roman Baber	Senators:	0	-	0	0	0	0	0	0	0	0
Patrick Brown	MPs:	0	1	0	0	0	0	0	0	0	1
Patrick Brown	Senators:	0	-	0	0	2	0	0	0	0	2
Jean Charest	MPs:	2	1	0	1	4	7	0	1	0	16
Jean Charest	Senators:	0	-	0	0	0	2	2	0	0	4
Leslyn Lewis	MPs:	1	2	3	1	1	0	2	0	0	10
Leslyn Lewis	Senators:	0	-	0	0	0	0	0	0	0	0
Pierre Poilievre	MPs:	10	19	7	3	18	1	2	1	1	62
Pierre Poilievre	Senators:	1	-	1	1	0	2	0	1	1	7
No endorsement	MPs:	0	7	4	2	10	2	0	1	0	26
No endorsement	Senators:	0	-	0	0	0	1	0	0	2	3
Total	MPs:	13	30	14	7	34	10	4	3	1	116 (Note: This total does not include sitting members currently running for the leadership.)
Total	Senators:	1	-	1	1	2	5	2	1	3	16

== Scott Aitchison ==
=== Members of Parliament ===
- Eric Melillo (MP for Kenora, ON)

== Roman Baber ==
=== Former Members of Parliament ===
- David Sweet (MP for Flamborough—Glanbrook, 2015–2021, and Ancaster—Dundas—Flamborough—Westdale, 2006–2015)

== Patrick Brown ==
=== Members of Parliament ===
- ~~Dan Muys (MP for Flamborough—Glanbrook, ON)~~ (Switched endorsement to Pierre Poilievre on June 7)
- Michelle Rempel Garner (MP for Calgary Nose Hill, AB; former Minister of Western Economic Diversification, 2013–2015)
- ~~Kyle Seeback (MP for Dufferin—Caledon, ON)~~ (Switched endorsement to Pierre Poilievre on June 7)
- ~~Doug Shipley (MP for Barrie—Springwater—Oro-Medonte, ON)~~ (Endorsed Pierre Poilievre on July 24, following Brown's disqualification)

=== Senators ===
- Salma Ataullahjan (Senator for Ontario)
- Victor Oh (Senator for Ontario)

=== Provincial & territorial politicians ===
- Devinder Toor (Alberta MLA for Calgary-Falconridge)

=== Municipal politicians ===
- Gordon Krantz (Mayor of Milton, Ontario)

=== Former Members of Parliament ===
- Scott Armstrong (MP for Cumberland—Colchester—Musquodoboit Valley, 2009–2015)
- Chungsen Leung (MP for Willowdale, 2011–2015)
- ~~John Reynolds (MP for West Vancouver—Sunshine Coast, 1997–2004; Interim Leader of the Canadian Alliance 2001–2002)~~ (Endorsed Jean Charest on July 12, following Brown's disqualification)
- Rodney Weston (MP for Saint John, 2008–2015)

=== Former Senators ===
- Asha Seth (Senator for Ontario, 2012–2014)
- ~~Gerry St. Germain (Senator for British Columbia, 1993–2012) and MP for Mission—Port Moody, 1983–1988)~~ (Endorsed Jean Charest following Brown's disqualification)

== Jean Charest ==
=== Members of Parliament ===
- Larry Brock (MP for Brantford—Brant, ON)
- Frank Caputo (MP for Kamloops—Thompson—Cariboo, BC)
- Gérard Deltell (MP for Louis-Saint-Laurent, QC; former Opposition House Leader, 2020–2022)
- Dave Epp (MP for Chatham-Kent—Leamington, ON)
- Ed Fast (MP for Abbotsford, BC; former Minister of International Trade, 2011–2015)
- Bernard Généreux (MP for Montmagny—L'Islet—Kamouraska—Rivière-du-Loup, QC)
- Joël Godin (MP for Portneuf—Jacques-Cartier, QC)
- Richard Lehoux (MP for Beauce, QC)
- Ron Liepert (MP for Calgary Signal Hill, AB; former Alberta Minister of Finance, 2011–2012)
- Larry Maguire (MP for Brandon—Souris, MB; former Manitoba MLA for Arthur-Virden, 1999–2013)
- Richard Martel (MP for Chicoutimi—Le Fjord, QC)
- John Nater (MP for Perth Wellington, ON)
- Rick Perkins (MP for South Shore—St. Margarets, NS)
- Alain Rayes (MP for Richmond—Arthabaska, QC; former party Quebec lieutenant, 2017–2020; 2021–2022, former mayor of Victoriaville, 2009–2015)
- Karen Vecchio (MP for Elgin—Middlesex—London, ON)
- Dominique Vien (MP for Bellechasse—Les Etchemins—Lévis, QC; former MNA for Bellechasse, 2003–2007; 2008–2018)

=== Senators ===
- Pierre-Hugues Boisvenu (Senator for Quebec)
- Jean-Guy Dagenais (Senator for Quebec) (CSG)
- Percy Mockler (Senator for New Brunswick)
- Dennis Patterson (Senator for Nunavut, Premier of the Northwest Territories 1987–1991) (CSG)
- Rose-May Poirier (Senator for New Brunswick, Chair of the Senate Conservative Caucus; former New Brunswick MLA for Rogersville-Kouchibouguac, 1999–2010, Minister responsible for Human Resources, 2003–2006)
- Larry Smith (Senator for Quebec)
- Scott Tannas (Senator for Alberta, Leader of the Canadian Senators Group)
- Vernon White (Senator for Ontario, Chief of the Ottawa Police Service, 2007–2012) (CSG)

=== Provincial & territorial politicians ===
- Richard Ames (New Brunswick MLA for Carleton-York)
- Dominic Cardy (New Brunswick MLA for Fredericton West-Hanwell; Minister of Education and Early Childhood)
- Helen Conway-Ottenheimer (Newfoundland and Labrador MHA for Harbour Main)
- Bill Hogan (New Brunswick MLA for Carleton; Minister of Public Safety)
- Margaret Johnson (New Brunswick MLA for Carleton-Victoria; Minister of Agriculture, Aquaculture, and Fisheries
- Christine St-Pierre (Quebec MNA for Acadie; former Minister of International Relations and La Francophonie, 2014–2018)
- Lise Thériault (Quebec MNA for Anjou—Louis-Riel; former Deputy Premier of Quebec, 2014–2017)
- Kathleen Weil (Quebec MNA for Notre-Dame-de-Grâce (provincial electoral district); former Minister of Justice, 2008–2010, and former Minister of Immigration, 2010–2012)

=== Municipal politicians ===
- Gilles Lehouillier (Mayor of Lévis, 2013–present, and Quebec MNA for Lévis, 2008–2012)

=== Former Members of Parliament ===
- Chris Alexander (MP for Ajax—Pickering, 2011–2015; former Minister of Citizenship and Immigration, 2013–2015)
- Joyce Bateman (MP for Winnipeg South Centre, 2011–2015)
- Pierre Blais (MP for Bellechasse, 1984–1993; former Minister of Justice, 1993–1993)
- Sylvie Boucher (MP for Beauport—Côte-de-Beaupré—Île d'Orléans—Charlevoix), 2015–2019; MP for Beauport-Limoilou, 2006–2011)
- Lawrence Cannon (MP for Pontiac, 2006–2011; former Minister of Foreign Affairs, 2008–2011)
- Dorothy Dobbie (MP for Winnipeg South, 1988–1993)
- Jean F. Dubé (MP for Madawaska—Restigouche, 1997–2000, and New Brunswick MLA for Campbellton 2001–2003)
- Laurie Hawn (MP for Edmonton Centre, 2006–2015)
- Peter Kent (MP for Thornhill, 2008–2021; former Minister of the Environment, 2011–2013)
- Cathy McLeod (MP for Kamloops—Thompson—Cariboo, 2008–2021)
- Rob Nicholson (MP for Niagara Falls, 1984–1993, 2004–2019; former Minister of Justice, 2007–2013)
- Christian Paradis (MP for Megantic—L'Erable, 2006–2015; former Minister of Industry, 2011–2013)
- Lisa Raitt (MP for Halton, 2008–2015, and Milton, 2015–2019; former Minister of Transport, 2013–2015; former Deputy Leader of the Official Opposition and of the Conservative Party, 2017–2019)
- John Reynolds (MP for West Vancouver—Sunshine Coast, 1997–2004; Interim Leader of the Canadian Alliance 2001–2002)
- ~~David Sweet (MP for Flamborough—Glanbrook, 2006–2021)~~ (Joined Roman Baber's campaign)
- Mike Wallace (MP for Burlington, 2006–2015)

=== Former Senators ===
- Consiglio Di Nino (Senator for Ontario, 1990–2012)
- Ghislain Maltais (Senator for Shawinegan, Quebec, 2012–2019)
- André Pratte (Senator for De Salaberry, Quebec, 2016–2019)
- Michel Rivard (Senator for The Laurentides, Quebec, 2009–2016)
- Bob Runciman (Senator for Ontario, 2010–2017, and MPP for Leeds—Grenville, 1981–2010)
- Gerry St. Germain (Senator for British Columbia, 1993–2012) and MP for Mission—Port Moody, 1983–1988)

=== Former provincial & territorial politicians ===
- David Alward (Premier of New Brunswick, 2010–2014)
- Jamie Baillie (Leader of the Progressive Conservative Party of Nova Scotia, 2010–2018, Leader of the Opposition, 2013–2018, and MLA for Cumberland South, 2010–2018)
- Julie Boulet (Quebec MNA for Laviolette, 2011–2018, former Minister of Tourism, 2016–2018)
- Christy Clark (Premier of British Columbia, 2011–2017)
- Jean D'Amour (Quebec MNA for Rivière-du-Loup, 2009–2012, and Rivière-du-Loup–Témiscouata, 2012–2018)
- Luc Fortin (Quebec MNA for Sherbrooke, 2014–2018; former Minister of Families, 2017–2018)
- Sam Hamad (Quebec MNA for Louis-Hébert, 2003–2017; former Minister of Labour, 2014-2016)
- Mike Harris (Premier of Ontario, 1995–2002)
- Rodney MacDonald (Premier of Nova Scotia, 2006–2009)
- Wes McLean (New Brunswick MLA for Victoria-Tobique, 2010–2014)
- Norbert Morin (Quebec MNA for Montmagny-L'Islet, 2003–2007 and 2008–2012, and Côte-du-Sud, 2012–2018)
- Rob Norris (Saskatchewan MLA for Saskatoon Greystone, 2007–2015)
- John Ottenheimer (Newfoundland and Labrador MHA for St. John's East, 1996–2007, former Minister of Intergovernmental Affairs, 2006–2007)
- Dave Quest (Alberta MLA for Strathcona-Sherwood Park, 2008–2015)
- Shiraz Shariff (Alberta MLA for Calgary-McCall, 1995–2008)
- Serge Simard (Quebec MNA for Dubuc, 2008–2012 and 2014–2018)
- Moira Stilwell (British Columbia MLA for Vancouver-Langara, 2009–2017, former Minister of Advanced Education and Labour Market Development, 2009–2010)
- Rick Swenson (Saskatchewan MLA for Thunder Creek, 1985–1995, former Minister of Energy and Mines, 1989–1991, Minister of Indian and Métis Affairs, 1991, Interim leader of the Progressive Conservative Party of Saskatchewan, 1992–1994; leader, 2006–2018, Leader of the Opposition in Saskatchewan, 1993–1994)
- Allan Warrack (Alberta MLA for Three Hills, 1971–1979, former Minister of Lands and Forests, 1971–1975, former Minister of Utilities and Telephones, 1975–1979)

=== Former municipal politicians ===
- Jean Perrault (Mayor of Sherbrooke, QC, 1994–2009)
- Rick Goldring (Mayor of Burlington, Ontario, 2010–2018 and Burlington City Councillor for Ward 5, 2006–2010)
- Steve Shanahan (Montreal City Councillor for Peter-McGill, 2013–2017 and Conservative candidate for Ville-Marie—Le Sud-Ouest—Île-des-Sœurs in 2015 and 2021)

=== Other prominent individuals ===
- Vincenzo Guzzo (Businessman and television personality)
- Tasha Kheiriddin (Postmedia political columnist and author; one of Charest's campaign co-chairs)
- Kevin O'Leary (Businessman, television personality, and 2017 leadership election candidate)
- Greg Smith (Curler, two time Newfoundland and Labrador champion)

== Leslyn Lewis ==
=== Members of Parliament ===
- Dean Allison (MP for Niagara West, ON)
- Richard Bragdon (MP for Tobique—Mactaquac, NB)
- Marc Dalton (MP for Pitt Meadows—Maple Ridge, BC; former MLA for Maple Ridge-Mission, 2009–2017)
- Rosemarie Falk (MP for Battlefords—Lloydminster, SK)
- Ted Falk (MP for Provencher, MB)
- Garnett Genuis (MP for Sherwood Park—Fort Saskatchewan, AB)
- Rob Moore (MP for Fundy Royal, NB)
- Jeremy Patzer (MP for Cypress Hills—Grasslands, SK)
- Arnold Viersen (MP for Peace River—Westlock, AB)
- Cathay Wagantall (MP for Yorkton—Melville, SK)

=== Former Members of Parliament ===
- Harold Albrecht (MP for Kitchener—Conestoga, 2006–2019)
- Stockwell Day (MP for Okanagan—Coquihalla, 2000–2011; former leader of the Canadian Alliance, 2000–2001; former President of the Treasury Board, 2010–2011)
- Reed Elley (MP for Nanaimo—Cowichan, 1997–2004)
- Tamara Jansen (MP for Cloverdale-Langley City, 2019–2021)
- Brad Trost (MP for Saskatoon—University, 2015–2019 and Saskatoon—Humboldt, 2004–2015)
- Maurice Vellacott (MP for Saskatoon—Wanuskewin, 1997–2015)

=== Former provincial & territorial politicians ===
- Greg Brkich (Saskatchewan MLA for Arm River, 1999–2020)
- Patterk Netser (Nunavut MLA for Aivilik, 2017–2021 and Nanulik, 2004–2008)

=== Other prominent individuals ===
- Craig Chandler (Businessman, lobbyist, and political activist)
- Charles McVety (President of Canada Christian College)

=== Organizations ===
- Campaign Life Coalition

== Pierre Poilievre ==
=== Members of Parliament ===
- Ziad Aboultaif (MP for Edmonton Manning, AB)
- Dan Albas (MP for Central Okanagan—Similkameen—Nicola, BC)
- Mel Arnold (MP for North Okanagan—Shuswap, BC)
- John Barlow (MP for Foothills, AB)
- Michael Barrett (MP for Leeds—Grenville—Thousand Islands and Rideau Lakes, ON; Shadow Minister for Ethics)
- James Bezan (MP for Selkirk—Interlake—Eastman, MB)
- Kelly Block (MP for Carlton Trail—Eagle Creek, SK)
- Adam Chambers (MP for Simcoe North, ON)
- Colin Carrie (MP for Oshawa, ON)
- Michael Cooper (MP for St. Albert—Edmonton, AB)
- Scot Davidson (MP for York—Simcoe, ON)
- Todd Doherty (MP for Cariboo—Prince George, BC)
- Earl Dreeshen (MP for Red Deer—Mountain View, AB)
- Eric Duncan (MP for Stormont—Dundas—South Glengarry, ON)
- Stephen Ellis (MP for Cumberland—Colchester, NS)
- Michelle Ferreri (MP for Peterborough—Kawartha, ON)
- Kerry-Lynne Findlay (MP for South Surrey—White Rock, BC; former Minister of National Revenue, 2013–2015)
- Cheryl Gallant (MP for Renfrew—Nipissing—Pembroke, ON)
- Marilyn Gladu (MP for Sarnia—Lambton, ON; former Shadow President of the Queen's Privy Council for Canada, 2020–2021, Shadow Minister of Health, 2017–2020)
- Tracy Gray (MP for Kelowna—Lake Country, BC)
- Jasraj Hallan (MP for Calgary Forest Lawn, AB)
- Matt Jeneroux (MP for Edmonton Riverbend, AB)
- Pat Kelly (MP for Calgary Rocky Ridge, AB)
- Robert Kitchen (MP for Souris—Moose Mountain, SK)
- Michael Kram (MP for Regina—Wascana, SK)
- Damien Kurek (MP for Battle River—Crowfoot, AB)
- Stephanie Kusie (MP for Calgary Midnapore, AB)
- Melissa Lantsman (MP for Thornhill, ON)
- Phillip Lawrence (MP for Northumberland—Peterborough South, ON)
- Chris Lewis (MP for Essex, ON)
- Dane Lloyd (MP for Sturgeon River—Parkland, AB)
- Dave Mackenzie (MP for Oxford, ON)
- Dan Mazier (MP for Dauphin—Swan River—Neepawa, MB)
- Kelly McCauley (MP for Edmonton West, AB)
- Marty Morantz (MP for Charleswood—St. James—Assiniboia—Headingley, MB)
- Rob Morrison (MP for Kootenay—Columbia, BC)
- Glen Motz (MP for Medicine Hat—Cardston—Warner, AB)
- Dan Muys (MP for Flamborough—Glanbrook, ON)
- Pierre Paul-Hus (MP for Charlesbourg—Haute-Saint-Charles, QC)
- Brad Redekopp (MP for Saskatoon West, SK)
- Blake Richards (MP for Banff—Airdrie, AB; former Chief Opposition Whip, 2020–2022)
- Anna Roberts (MP for King—Vaughan, ON)
- Kyle Seeback (MP for Dufferin—Caledon)
- Andrew Scheer (MP for Regina—Qu'Appelle, SK; former leader of the Conservative Party, 2017–2020, Speaker of the House of Commons, 2011–2015; chair of Poilievre's campaign in Saskatchewan)
- Jamie Schmale (MP for Haliburton—Kawartha Lakes—Brock, ON)
- Martin Shields (MP for Bow River, AB)
- Doug Shipley (MP for Barrie—Springwater—Oro-Medonte, ON)
- Clifford Small (MP for Coast of Bays—Central—Notre Dame, NL)
- Gerald Soroka (MP for Yellowhead, AB)
- Jake Stewart (MP for Miramichi—Grand Lake, NB)
- Mark Strahl (MP for Chilliwack—Hope, BC; former Chief Opposition Whip, 2017–2020)
- Shannon Stubbs (MP for Lakeland, AB)
- Corey Tochor (MP for Saskatoon—University, SK)
- Fraser Tolmie (MP for Moose Jaw—Lake Centre—Lanigan, SK)
- Tim Uppal (MP for Edmonton Mill Woods, AB; former Minister of State (Multiculturalism), 2013–2015; former Conservative Party Caucus Liaison, 2020–2022; co-chair of Poilievre's campaign)
- Tako van Popta (MP for Langley—Aldergrove, BC)
- Brad Vis (MP for Mission—Matsqui—Fraser Canyon, BC)
- Chris Warkentin (MP for Grande Prairie-Mackenzie, AB)
- Len Webber (MP for Calgary Confederation, AB)
- Ryan Williams (MP for Bay of Quinte, ON)
- John Williamson (MP for New Brunswick Southwest, NB)
- Bob Zimmer (MP for Prince George—Peace River—Northern Rockies, BC)

=== Senators ===
- Denise Batters (Senator for Saskatchewan)
- Claude Carignan (Senator for Quebec)
- Leo Housakos (Senator for Quebec and former Speaker of the Senate of Canada)
- Michael L. MacDonald (Senator for Nova Scotia)
- Yonah Martin (Senator for British Columbia)
- Don Plett (Senator for Manitoba, Leader of the Opposition in the Senate, and former President of the Conservative Party, 2003-2009)
- David Wells (Senator for Newfoundland and Labrador)

=== Provincial & territorial politicians ===
- Steven Bonk (Saskatchewan MLA for Moosomin)
- Fred Bradshaw (Saskatchewan MLA for Carrot River Valley)
- David Buckingham (Saskatchewan MLA for Saskatoon Westview)
- Ken Cheveldayoff (Saskatchewan MLA for Saskatoon Willowgrove)
- Dan Davies (British Columbia MLA for Peace River North)
- Mike de Jong (British Columbia MLA for Abbotsford West, former British Columbia Minister of Finance, 2012–2017)
- Terry Dennis (Saskatchewan MLA for Canora-Pelly)
- Devin Dreeshen (Alberta MLA for Innisfail-Sylvan Lake)
- Dustin Duncan (Saskatchewan MLA for Weyburn-Big Muddy)
- Tanya Fir (Alberta MLA for Calgary-Peigan and Associate Minister of Red Tape Reduction)
- Ken Francis (Saskatchewan MLA for Kindersley)
- Shane Getson (Alberta MLA for Lac Ste. Anne-Parkland)
- Nate Glubish (Alberta MLA for Strathcona-Sherwood Park and Minister of Service Alberta)
- Kelvin Goertzen (Manitoba MLA for Steinbach and former Premier of Manitoba, 2021)
- Todd Goudy (Saskatchewan MLA for Melfort)
- Gary Grewal (Saskatchewan MLA for Regina Northeast)
- Josh Guenter (Manitoba MLA for Borderland)
- Joe Hargrave (Saskatchewan MLA for Prince Albert Carlton)
- Daryl Harrison (Saskatchewan MLA for Cannington)
- Brian Jean (Alberta MLA for Fort McMurray-Lac La Biche and 2022 UCP leadership candidate; former leader of the Wildrose Party (2015–2017), Leader of the Opposition (2015–2017), MLA for Fort McMurray-Conklin (2015–2017), MP for Athabasca (2004–2006) and Fort McMurray—Athabasca (2006–2014)
- Terry Jenson (Saskatchewan MLA for Martensville-Warman)
- Travis Keisig (Saskatchewan MLA for Last Mountain-Touchwood)
- Delbert Kirsch (Saskatchewan MLA for Batoche)
- Greg Lawrence (Saskatchewan MLA for Moose Jaw Wakamow)
- Tim McLeod (Saskatchewan MLA for Moose Jaw North)
- Hugh Nerlien (Saskatchewan MLA for Kelvington-Wadena)
- Demetrios Nicolaides (Alberta MLA for Calgary-Bow and Minister of Advanced Education)
- Greg Ottenbreit (Saskatchewan MLA for Yorkton)
- Ron Schuler (Manitoba MLA for Springfield-Ritchot)
- Rebecca Schulz (Alberta MLA for Calgary-Shaw and 2022 UCP leadership candidate)
- Dana Skoropad (Saskatchewan MLA for Arm River)
- Doug Steele (Saskatchewan MLA for Cypress Hills)
- Christine Tell (Saskatchewan MLA for Regina Wascana Plains)
- Travis Toews (Alberta MLA for Grande Prairie-Wapiti and 2022 UCP leadership candidate; former Alberta Minister of Finance, 2019–2022)
- Searle Turton (Alberta MLA for Spruce Grove-Stony Plain)
- Jordan Walker (Alberta MLA for Sherwood Park)
- Colleen Young (Saskatchewan MLA for Lloydminster)

=== Former Members of Parliament ===
- John Baird (MP for Ottawa West—Nepean, 2006–2015; former Minister of Foreign Affairs, 2011–2015)
- Jean-Pierre Blackburn (MP for Jonquière—Alma, 2006–2011 and Jonquière, 1984–1993; former Minister of Veterans Affairs, 2010–2011)
- Kenny Chiu (MP for Steveston—Richmond East, 2019–2021)
- Tony Clement (MP for Parry Sound-Muskoka, 2006–2019; former President of the Treasury Board, 2011–2015; national director of fundraising for Poilievre's campaign)
- Kerry Diotte (MP for Edmonton Griesbach, 2015–2021)
- Bal Gosal (MP for Bramalea—Gore—Malton, 2011–2015; former Minister of State (Sport), 2011–2015)
- Stephen Harper (MP for Calgary Heritage, 2015–2016, Calgary Southwest, 2002–2015, and Calgary West, 1993–1997; Prime Minister of Canada, 2006–2015)
- Wladyslaw Lizon (MP for Mississauga East—Cooksville, 2011–2015)
- Elmer MacKay (MP for Central Nova, 1984–1993, 1971–1983)
- Inky Mark (MP for Dauphin—Swan River—Marquette, 1997–2010)
- Rob Merrifield (MP for Yellowhead, 2000–2014)
- Joe Oliver (MP for Eglinton—Lawrence, 2011–2015; former Minister of Finance, 2014–2015)
- Bob Saroya (MP for Markham—Unionville, 2015–2021)
- Gail Shea (MP for Egmont, 2008–2015; former Minister of Fisheries and Oceans, 2013–2015)
- Devinder Shory (MP for Calgary Northeast, 2008–2015)
- Lawrence Toet (MP for Elmwood—Transcona, 2011–2015)
- Jeff Watson (MP for Essex, 2004–2015)
- David Wilks (MP for Kootenay—Columbia, 2011–2015)
- David Yurdiga (MP for Fort McMurray—Cold Lake, 2014–2021)

=== Former Senators ===
- Nicole Eaton (Senator for Ontario, 2009–2020)
- David Tkachuk (Senator for Saskatchewan, 1993–2020)

=== Former provincial & territorial politicians ===
- Ches Crosbie (Newfoundland and Labrador MHA for Windsor Lake, 2018–2021; Leader of the PC Party of Newfoundland and Labrador, 2018–2021)
- Heather Forsyth (Alberta MLA for Calgary-Fish Creek, 1993–2015; Interim Leader of the Wildrose Party, 2014–2015)
- Brian Macdonald (New Brunswick MLA for Fredericton-Silverwood, 2010–2014, and Fredericton West-Hanwell, 2014–2018)
- Christina Mitas (Ontario MPP for Scarborough Centre, 2018–2022)
- Danielle Smith (2022 UCP leadership candidate, Alberta MLA for Highwood, 2012–2015, Leader of the Wildrose Party, 2009–2014, and Leader of the Opposition, 2012–2014)

=== Former municipal politicians ===
- Yves Lévesque (Mayor of Trois-Rivières, Quebec, 2001–2018, and Conservative candidate for Trois-Rivières in 2019 and 2021)
- Larry O'Brien (Mayor of Ottawa, Ontario, 2006–2010)

=== Other prominent individuals ===
- Jenni Byrne (Political advisor, political commentator, and government relations expert; Co-Deputy Chief of Staff, Prime Minister's Office, 2013–2015, and Director of Political Operations, Conservative Party of Canada, 2009–2013)
- Nathalie Elgrably-Lévy (Economics teacher at HEC Montréal)
- Daniel Hannan (Adviser to the UK Board of Trade, Member of the House of Lords, and Former Member of the European Parliament for South East England, 1999–2020)
- Mark McEwan (Celebrity chef)
- Rex Murphy (Political commentator and author for National Post)
- Tom Pentefountas (Vice-chairman of Broadcasting of the CRTC (2011–2015), President of the Action démocratique du Québec (2007–2008), and 2019 candidate in Laval—Les Îles)
- Jordan Peterson (Clinical psychologist, YouTube personality, author, and a professor emeritus at the University of Toronto)
- W. Brett Wilson (Businessman)

=== Media ===
- Ontario Proud

== Failed to qualify ==
=== Grant Abraham ===
==== Organizations ====
- Campaign Life Coalition

=== Leona Alleslev ===
==== Former provincial & territorial politicians ====
- Steve Gilchrist (Ontario MPP for Scarborough East, 1995–2003)

=== Joseph Bourgault ===
==== Former Members of Parliament ====
- Rob Anders (MP for Calgary West, 1997–2015)

==== Other prominent individuals ====
- Theoren Fleury (Former professional ice hockey player, author, and motivational speaker)

==== Organizations ====
- Campaign Life Coalition

=== Marc Dalton ===
==== Organizations ====
- Campaign Life Coalition

=== Joel Etienne ===
No endorsements.

=== Bobby Singh ===
No endorsements.
