= Sean O'Sullivan (priest) =

Canadian politician

The Reverend Sean O'Sullivan CM

Member of Parliament for Hamilton—Wentworth
- In office 30 October 1972 – 13 September 1977
- Preceded by: Colin D. Gibson
- Succeeded by: Geoffrey Scott

Personal details
- Born: Sean Patrick Paul O'Sullivan; 1 January 1952 Hamilton, Ontario, Canada
- Died: 9 March 1989 (aged 37) Toronto, Ontario, Canada
- Party: Progressive Conservative

Sean Patrick Paul O'Sullivan CM (1 January 1952– 9 March 1989), was a Canadian politician who left politics to become a Roman Catholic priest.

Born in 1952 in Hamilton, Ontario, O'Sullivan showed an interest in politics at a young age. When he was 11 years old, he worked for Ellen Fairclough in her election campaign and met John Diefenbaker for the first time. He was educated at Bishop Ryan Catholic Secondary School and Brock University in St. Catharines. When he was just 15 years old, he was named Western Ontario representative of the Youth for Diefenbaker movement. This movement was formed in Ottawa to engage the support of Canada's young conservatives for John Diefenbaker at the leadership convention. In 1970, at age 18, he was chosen as president of the Young Progressive Conservatives of Canada.

In 1971, Diefenbaker appointed O'Sullivan as his executive assistant. In the 1972 election, O'Sullivan was elected as the Progressive Conservative MP for the riding of Hamilton-Wentworth. At 20 years and 10 months, O'Sullivan became the youngest member elected to the House of Commons of Canada at that time. In 1974, Liberal Claude-André Lachance, elected at 20 years and 3 months, became the youngest-ever MP, and later, New Democrat Pierre-Luc Dusseault beat that record in 2011, being elected at 19 years and 11 months. O'Sullivan was re-elected in 1974. It was O'Sullivan's private member's bill in 1975 that gained recognition for the beaver as Canada's official animal symbol.

In 1977, O'Sullivan announced that he was leaving politics to enter the Roman Catholic priesthood, eventually becoming Director of Vocations for the Archdiocese of Toronto, as well as publisher of The Catholic Register newspaper.

O'Sullivan learned he was suffering from leukaemia in 1983. After treatment, the disease went into remission. During a Brock University convocation ceremony in 1985, Father O'Sullivan was conferred an honorary degree, and he delivered the convocation address. In 1986, he was made a Member of the Order of Canada. With the return of his illness in 1989, O'Sullivan entered Princess Margaret Hospital in Toronto for a bone marrow transplant. He died there on 9 March 1989, aged 37.

Parliament of Canada
Preceded by Colin Gibson	Member of Parliament from Hamilton—Wentworth; 1972-1977	Succeeded by Geoffrey Scott
