= David Sweet =

Canadian politician (born 1957)

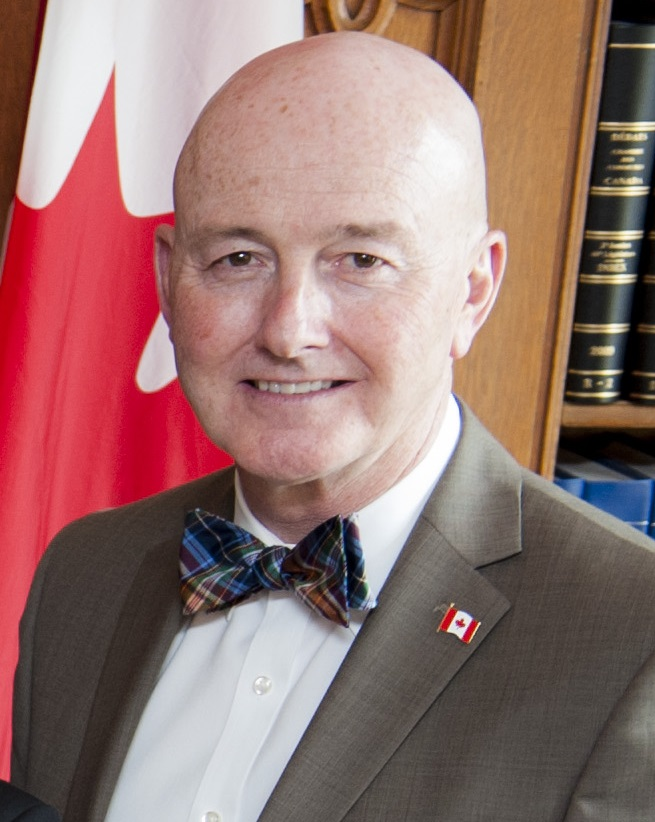

Member of Parliament for Flamborough—Glanbrook Ancaster—Dundas—Flamborough—Westdale (2006–2015)
- In office January 23, 2006 – September 20, 2021
- Preceded by: Russ Powers
- Succeeded by: Dan Muys

Chair of the Standing Committee on Access to Information, Privacy and Ethics
- In office October 8, 2020 – August 15, 2021
- Preceded by: Rachael Harder
- Succeeded by: TBD

Shadow Minister for Shadow Minister for International Human Rights and Religious Freedom
- In office November 29, 2019 – September 8, 2020
- Preceded by: David Anderson
- Succeeded by: Garnett Genuis

Chair of the Conservative Party Parliamentary House Caucus
- In office November 5, 2015 – September 11, 2019
- Preceded by: Guy Lauzon
- Succeeded by: Tom Kmiec

Chair of the Standing Committee on Industry, Science & Technology
- In office September 30, 2010 – August 2, 2015
- Minister: Tony Clement; Christian Paradis; James Moore
- Preceded by: Michael Chong
- Succeeded by: Dan Ruimy

Personal details
- Born: June 24, 1957 (age 69) Kingston, Ontario, Canada
- Party: Conservative
- Spouse: Almut Sweet
- Profession: Business consultant, Real estate broker

David Sweet (born June 24, 1957) is a former Canadian politician who served as a Member of Parliament (MP) from 2006 to 2021. He represented the riding of Ancaster—Dundas—Flamborough—Westdale from 2006 to 2015 and, following the 2012 federal electoral district redistribution, he represented the riding of Flamborough—Glanbrook from 2015 to 2021. A member of the Conservative Party, he served as the Shadow Minister for International Rights and Religious Freedom from 2019 to 2020. Throughout his tenure, Sweet served as chair and vice chair for a number of committees. During the 42nd Canadian Parliament, he served as the chair of the Conservative Party's parliamentary national caucus.

== Early life ==
Sweet was born and raised in Kingston, Ontario to Gordon, a former sergeant of the Canadian Armed Forces and television repairman, and Jean Sweet, where he was raised alongside five siblings. At the age of thirteen, Sweet ran away from home and lived on the street for several months, eventually being caught and sent to St. Joseph's Training School in Alfred, Ontario. At St. Joseph's, one of the province-run training schools for "incorrigible" youth, Sweet endured physical beatings by the Catholic brothers who ran the school, and was regularly bullied and beaten by other boys, beatings which were ignored by the guards. Sweet attempted to run away from the reformatory, but was caught and put in solitary confinement for ten days. At one point, Sweet was made to scrub walls with bleach using his bare hands for three hours as punishment. Sweet remained at the institution until he was 16 years old.

== Business career ==
Prior to being elected a Member of Parliament, Sweet owned and operated a variety of businesses. He and wife, Almut, ran a tow truck business in Mississauga, Ontario from 1978 through the early 1980s and lead a real estate brokerage during the 1980s building boom. In the years leading up to his political career, Sweet owned a management consulting firm, which he operated for 17 years based on his experience in his previous business ventures. Sweet's business offered training services to a variety of corporate, public, and not-for-profit clients.

In 1996, Sweet was the founding President of the Canadian Association of Professional Speakers, an organization that provides training opportunities for and promotes professional speakers.

== Political career ==
=== 2004 federal election ===
In 2004, Sweet contested the nomination for the newly formed Conservative Party of Canada in the riding of Ancaster—Dundas—Flamborough—Westdale, defeating incumbent Liberal-turned-Conservative MP John Bryden. In the 38th federal election, Sweet placed second to former Hamilton City Councillor Russ Powers.

=== Member of parliament ===
In advance of the 39th federal election, Sweet secured the Conservative Party's nomination again. On January 23, 2006, Sweet won the right to represent Ancaster-Dundas-Flamborough-Westdale in the 39th Parliament, beating incumbent Russ Powers, whom Sweet had lost to in the previous election. Upon his arrival in Ottawa, Sweet was appointed a Member and later elected vice-chair on the House of Commons Standing Committees on Public Accounts, as well as a Member of the Veterans Affairs Committee and the Subcommittee on International Human Rights. On June 22, 2006, Sweet obtained the unanimous consent of the House of Commons for a motion awarding honorary Canadian citizenship to the 14th Dalai Lama of Tibet, Tenzin Gyatso. Gyatso was the 3rd person to receive such an honour, after Raoul Wallenberg in 1985 and Nelson Mandela in 2001.

Sweet won re-election in Ancaster—Dundas—Flamborough—Westdale during the 2008 Canadian election, defeating Liberal candidate Arlene MacFarlane-VanderBeek by over 10,000 votes. During the 40th Parliament, Sweet served as a Member of the Veterans Affairs Committee, of the Liaison Committee and the International Human Rights Subcommittee. At the beginning of the third session, Sweet was named Chair of the Industry, Science and Technology Committee in addition to his roles from the second session, which he maintained as well. On February 17, 2009, he was elected Chair of the Veterans’ Affairs Committee, which he served on since he was elected in 2006. Sweet also served as vice-chair of the Public Accounts Committee. On February 10, 2011, Sweet introduced a Private Member's Bill, Bill C-620, An Act to amend the Corrections and Conditional Release Act (parole review and victim impact statement) which was debated only once, on March 23, 2011, before the 40th Parliament was dissolved for the 2011 General Election.

In the 2011 Canadian election, Sweet won re-election in the riding of Ancaster—Dundas—Flamborough—Westdale, winning more than double the votes of Liberal candidate Dave Braden. During the 41st Parliament, Sweet remained as Chair of the Standing Committee on Industry, Science and Technology, as well as a Member of the Liaison Committee and the International Human Rights Subcommittee. On February 27, 2013, he introduced Private Member's Bill C-479, An Act to Bring Fairness to Victims of Violent Offenders. In his introductory speech, Sweet argued that his bill is aimed at "strengthening the voice of victims of violent crime and providing additional support to victims in the parole process" and "to modify parole and detention review dates giving the Parole Board of Canada the option of increasing the time between parole hearings for violent offenders." Sweet's Bill passed through the House of Commons and Senate, receiving all party support and receiving Royal Assent on April 23, 2015.

Pursuant to the 2012 federal electoral district redistribution, the riding of Ancaster—Dundas—Flamborough—Westdale was redistributed, primarily into the ridings of Hamilton West—Ancaster—Dundas and Flamborough—Glanbrook. In the 42nd Canadian election, Sweet sought and won re-election over Liberal candidate Jennifer Stebbing in Flamborough—Glanbrook. On November 5, 2015, Sweet became the first elected Chair of the National Conservative Parliamentary Caucus, as prior to the 42nd Parliament the position was appointed by the party leader. In this role Sweet was responsible for organizing and chairing the meetings of the Conservative Caucus. During the 42nd Parliament, Sweet served as the Vice Chair of the Subcommittee on International Human Rights. Sweet also briefly served on the Standing Committee on Canadian Heritage during the study brought on by Motion 103.

Sweet was re-elected as the Member of Parliament for Flamborough-Glanbrook in the 2019 federal election, defeating Stebbing once again. On November 29, 2019, Sweet was named Shadow Minister for International Human Rights and Religious Freedoms by then-leader Andrew Scheer. On October 8, 2020, Sweet was elected Chair of the Standing Committee on Access to Information, Privacy, and Ethics.

==== COVID-19 travel scandal ====
In January 2021, Sweet was discovered to have travelled to the United States during the COVID-19 pandemic, despite the border between Canada and the United States being closed to nonessential travel and public health advisories to avoid unnecessary travel. Sweet received prior approval from Conservative Party leader Erin O'Toole for the trip, which was initially for a property issue but also, according to Sweet, for leisure. Sweet resigned from his role on the ethics committee and announced he would not be seeking re-election.

=== Political views ===
==== Mental health ====
Mental health is an issue that Sweet has repeatedly spoken about, particularly after the death of his daughter Lara in 2017. In his Member's statement following Lara's passing, he called upon the Government of Canada "to continue to adequately fund the Canadian Mental Health Commission" and "to be generous to the Canadian Mental Health Association and others who are deeply committed to the fight for mental wholeness."

in 2019, Sweet supported Private Members' Motion 174, which sought to introduce a National Strategy on Suicide Prevention. In the House of Commons, Sweet focused on speaking to the importance of such a strategy and, during his speech, gave an account of the day that his daughter committed suicide. "I share this painful and personal story to shed light on the importance of the initiative that the member from Timmins—James Bay is asking the House to consider, approve and undertake. Four thousand times a year someone takes their life in this country. It is true that it is not always someone's child or a youth or young adult, but all too often it is. I wanted my colleagues to know that their important and thoughtful vote to move this motion to a committee for study could eventually mean that the pain our family and thousands of other families endured could be significantly reduced. A national strategy could bring together all those individuals and organizations that are already doing great work on the front lines to address the mental health and suicide crisis, and bring them together to create synergies and best practices so that so many more people who are struggling could be helped."

During the 2019 Canadian Federal Election, Sweet campaigned on his record as an advocate for Mental Health by making it one of his five priorities if re-elected. He committed to advocating for increased funding for mental health research and programs, as well as promoting policies like the National Strategy on Suicide Prevention.

==== Training schools ====
Though not an area of federal jurisdiction, Sweet has repeatedly called for the Government of Ontario to launch a public inquiry into so-called "training schools" like the one he was sent to as a child. In a letter to then Attorney General Yasir Naqvi, Sweet told Naqvi that it was "disappointing that victims of only three of the sixteen institutions had been appropriately recognized, provided support and compensation", pointing out that of the thirteen that had not been recognized, all of them had been run by the provincial government. In his letter, Sweet argued that an inquiry would bring forward recommendations on how to avoid similar injustices in the future, inform the public who he said "deserve to know what happened to their children with their tax dollars", and demonstrate the Ontario government's commitment to justice for those harmed by flawed policies and actions. In response, Naqvi declined Sweet's request.

==== Foreign affairs and international human rights ====
Sweet is an outspoken critic of Iran, which he has described as a state that "terror, supports terrorist groups like Hamas and Hezbollah, imprisons, tortures and executes their own people and others." He has presented multiple petitions to the House of Commons calling upon the Government of Canada "to maintain the listing of the Islamic Republic of Iran as a state supporter of terrorism" and has opposed any rollback of sanctions against the country. Sweet has highlighted the plight of followers of the Baháʼí Faith in Iran, where they are subject to state sanctioned persecution, calling for the release of the Baháʼí Seven, Fariba Kamalabadi, Jamaloddin Khanjani, Mahvash Sabet, Afif Naeimi, Saeid Rezaei, Vahid Tizfahm, and Behrouz Tavakkoli, all of whom Sweet says were "wrongfully imprisoned".

A staunch supporter of the state of Israel, Sweet has traveled to Israel on multiple occasions, including alongside Prime Minister Stephen Harper and Governor General David Johnston. He has spoken out repeatedly in the House of Commons to condemn antisemitism and anti-Israel sentiments, including to denounce the Boycott, Divestment and Sanctions movement, which Sweet has referred to as "nothing but thinly veiled antisemitism, and to be very frank, Jew hatred." Sweet has also condemned Israel Apartheid Week as being "a concerted effort to demonize and delegitimize the right of the State of Israel to exist and the Jewish people to have a safe homeland therein". He has similarly held both the position of chair and Vice Chair of the Canada-Israel Interparliamentary Group.

Sweet is a vocal advocate for human rights and religious freedoms, having served on the House of Commons Subcommittee on International Human Rights since he was first elected in 2006. Since then, the subcommittee has studied a wide variety of international human rights situations, including the situation Rohingya Muslims in Myanmar; child slavery and modern slavery; the persecution of Uyghur Muslims in China; the treatment of religious minorities in Pakistan; the protection of woman human rights defenders; and much more.

He served on the Steering Committee of the Canadian Parliamentary Committee to Combat Antisemitism Canadian Parliamentary Coalition to Combat Antisemitism (CPCCA) and on the CPCCA's Inquiry Panel which released a public report on July 7, 2011. In November 2012, Sweet received the 2012 Humanitarian Award from the Hamilton Jewish Federation for his work on CPCCA and in speaking out against racism.

==== Scleroderma ====
Sweet makes an annual Members Statement in the House of Commons each June to recognize Scleroderma Month in Canada, saying on June 1, 2006: "If there is a note of passion in my voice, it is because my own family has had to deal with the devastating effects of scleroderma. My mother passed away from complications of this disease and cancer." Sweet also attends annual Scleroderma walks in Hamilton and across Ontario to advocate for research to find a cure for the rare disease.

== Personal life ==
Sweet lives in Ancaster, Ontario with his wife Almut. The two have five children (Chris, Lucian, Reuben, David Jr., and Lara) and four grandchildren. He also has a daughter, Theresa, from a previous marriage.

In 2017, Lara, whom David and Almut had adopted, died from an intentional drug overdose. On September 19, 2017, Sweet rose in the House of Commons to deliver a Member's statement in Lara's memory, crediting her with reshaping his "thinking on whether someone has to have it all together to assist others".

Sweet is a motorcycle enthusiast, speaking in the House of Commons on several occasions to promote road safety for motorcyclists. Sweet also participates in a number of charity motorcycle rides across Ontario, including Hamilton's Liberty for Youth Eagle Ride.

In April 2014, he was inducted as a Knight in the Order of St. George.

== Electoral record ==
2019 Canadian federal election: Flamborough—Glanbrook
Party	Candidate	Votes	%	±%	Expenditures
Conservative	David Sweet	24,527	39.22	-4.26	$113,962.62
Liberal	Jennifer Stebbing	22,875	36.58	-2.57	$55,126.88
New Democratic	Allison Cillis	10,322	16.50	+2.49	$12,541.49
Green	Janet Errygers	3,833	6.13	+2.77	$1,506.25
People's	David Tilden	982	1.57	-	none listed
Total valid votes/expense limit		62,539	99.39		
Total rejected ballots		381	0.61	+0.21	
Turnout		62,920	70.05	-0.14	
Eligible voters		89,823			
Conservative hold		Swing		-0.85	
Source: Elections Canada

2015 Canadian federal election: Flamborough—Glanbrook
Party	Candidate	Votes	%	±%	Expenditures
Conservative	David Sweet	24,137	43.48	-11.92	$157,159.87
Liberal	Jennifer Stebbing	21,728	39.14	+22.24	$37,599.55
New Democratic	Mike DiLivio	7,779	14.01	-8.78	$2,280.27
Green	Dave Allan Urquhart	1,866	3.36	-0.80	$2,276.63
Total valid votes/expense limit		55,510	99.61		$213,168.27
Total rejected ballots		220	0.39	–	
Turnout		55,730	70.19	–	
Eligible voters		79,397			
Conservative hold		Swing		-17.08	
Source: Elections Canada

2011 Canadian federal election: Ancaster—Dundas—Flamborough—Westdale
Party	Candidate	Votes	%	±%
Conservative	David Sweet	30,240	51.25	+4.75
Liberal	Dave Braden	14,594	24.74	-2.35
New Democratic	Nancy MacBain	10,956	18.57	+1.54
Green	Peter Ormond	2,963	5.02	-4.08
Libertarian	Anthony Giles	170	0.29	–
Marxist–Leninist	Jamilé Ghaddar	77	0.13	-0.13
Total valid votes/Expense limit		59,000	100.00	
Total rejected ballots		193	0.33	+0.03
Turnout		59,193	69.38	+2.68
Conservative hold		Swing		+3.55

2008 Canadian federal election: Ancaster—Dundas—Flamborough—Westdale
Party	Candidate	Votes	%	±%	Expenditures
Conservative	David Sweet	26,297	46.5%	+7.4%	$69,185
Liberal	Arlene MacFarlane-VanderBeek	15,322	27.1%	-7.4%	$42,231
New Democratic	Gordon Guyatt	9,632	17.0%	-4.3%	$44,859
Green	Peter Ormond	5,149	9.1%	+4.7%	$21,445
Marxist–Leninist	Jamilé Ghaddar	148	0.3%	+0.1%	
Total number of valid votes		56,548	99.7%		
Rejected ballots		170	0.3%		
Total number of votes		56,718	100%		

2006 Canadian federal election: Ancaster—Dundas—Flamborough—Westdale
Party	Candidate	Votes	%	±%
Conservative	David Sweet	24,530	39.1%	+4.5%
Liberal	Russ Powers	21,656	34.5%	-5.2%
New Democratic	Gordon Guyatt	13,376	21.3%	+0.4%
Green	David Januczkowski	2,767	4.4%	-0.4%
Independent	Ben Cowie	303	0.5%	-
Marxist–Leninist	Jamilé Ghaddar	112	0.2%	-
Total number of valid votes		62,744	99.9%	
Rejected ballots		175	0.1%	
Total number of votes		62,919	100%	

2004 Canadian federal election: Ancaster—Dundas—Flamborough—Westdale
Party	Candidate	Votes	%	±%
Liberal	Russ Powers	21,935	39.7%	
Conservative	David Sweet	19,135	34.6%	
New Democratic	Gordon Guyatt	11,557	20.9%	
Green	David Januczkowski	2,636	4.8%	
Total number of valid votes		55,263	99.5%	
Rejected ballots		252	0.5%	
Total number of votes		55,515	100%	
