= Geoffrey Scott (politician) =

Canadian politician (1938–2021)

Geoffrey Douglas Scott (March 2, 1938 — August 5, 2021) was a Canadian journalist and politician who was a Member of Parliament for the riding of Hamilton—Wentworth (now Ancaster—Dundas—Flamborough—Westdale). He was a member of the Progressive Conservative Party of Canada caucus.

The riding of Hamilton-Wentworth became open when Tory incumbent Sean O'Sullivan resigned to become a Catholic priest in 1977. Scott won it in a by-election held on October 16, 1978, and remained in office until 1993.

In his teenage years, Scott was a budding impressionist, a talent he occasionally displayed, but only on request, during his political career. He formed a partnership with another budding impressionist, Rich Little, in the mid-1950s.

For many years, prior to becoming a politician, Scott worked as a political television reporter and commentator in Ottawa's Parliamentary Press Gallery for CHCH Television (now CHCH-DT) of Hamilton and CFCF TV-12 (now CFCF-DT) of Montreal.

Parliament of Canada
Preceded by Sean O'Sullivan	Member of Parliament from Hamilton—Wentworth; 1978-1993	Succeeded by John Bryden
