= Colin D. Gibson =

Canadian politician

Colin David Gibson (November 2, 1922 – July 3, 2002) was a Canadian lawyer and politician.

Gibson was born into a political family. He was the son of Colin W. G. Gibson, a prominent Liberal cabinet minister during World War II, and the grandson of John Morison Gibson, former Attorney General of Ontario. He was educated at Upper Canada College.

On June 1, 1942, he enlisted in the Canadian army, stating a "desire to help the nation and defeat Hitler" As a platoon commander with the rank of Lieutenant in the Royal Hamilton Light Infantry, he fought on D-Day and was wounded several days later.

After returning to civilian life he practised law. In the 1968 federal election he was elected as a Liberal in the riding of Hamilton—Wentworth.

He was defeated in the 1972 federal election by Progressive Conservative Sean O'Sullivan, who at 20 years old was the youngest MP ever elected to that point.

Gibson was married and had two children.

Parliament of Canada
Preceded by riding created	Member of Parliament from Hamilton—Wentworth; 1968-1972	Succeeded by Sean O'Sullivan
