= Flamborough—Glanbrook—Brant North =

Federal electoral district in Ontario, Canada

Ontario electoral district
- Interactive map of riding boundaries from the 2025 federal election

Federal electoral district
- Legislature: House of Commons
MP
Dan Muys
Conservative
- District created: 2023
- First contested: 2025

Demographics
- Population (2021): 103,836
- Electors (2025): 86,541
- Area (km²): 1,097
- Pop. density (per km²): 94.7
- Census division(s): Brant, Hamilton
- Census subdivision(s): Hamilton (part), Brant (part)

Flamborough—Glanbrook—Brant North (French: Flamborough—Glanbrook—Brant-Nord) is a federal electoral district in Ontario, Canada. It came into effect upon the call of the 2025 Canadian federal election.

== Geography ==
Under the 2022 Canadian federal electoral redistribution the riding will largely replace Flamborough—Glanbrook.

- Gains that part of the County of Brant located roughly north of Brantford (Paris and St. George areas) from Brantford—Brant.
- Gains the remainder of the County of Brant from Cambridge.
- Loses all of its territory north of the Hydro corridor between Glancaster Road and Upper Centennial Parkway to Hamilton Mountain and Hamilton East—Stoney Creek.

== Demographics ==
According to the 2021 Canadian census

Languages: 85.8% English, 1.4% French, 1.2% Italian, 1.1% Portuguese

Religions: 61.2% Christian (27.3% Catholic, 6.3% United Church, 5.4% Anglican, 2.7% Reformed, 2.4% Presbyterian, 1.9% Baptist, 1.8% Christian Orthodox, 1.3% Pentecostal, 12.1% Other), 23.9% No religion, 2.7% Muslim, 1.2% Sikh, 1.1% Hindu

Median income: $48,400 (2020)

Average income: $62,350 (2020)

Panethnic groups
Panethnic group	2021	
Panethnic group	Pop.	%
European (Note: Statistic includes all persons that did not make up part of a visible minority or an indigenous identity.)	88,510	86.2%
South Asian	4,670	4.55%
African	2,370	2.31%
Indigenous	1,635	1.59%
Middle Eastern (Note: Statistic includes total responses of "West Asian" and "Arab" under visible minority section on census.)	1,325	1.29%
East Asian (Note: Statistic includes total responses of "Chinese", "Korean", and "Japanese" under visible minority section on census.)	1,170	1.14%
Southeast Asian (Note: Statistic includes total responses of "Filipino" and "Southeast Asian" under visible minority section on census.)	1,160	1.13%
Latin American	965	0.94%
Other/multiracial (Note: Statistic includes total responses of "Visible minority, n.i.e." and "Multiple visible minorities" under visible minority section on census.)	885	0.86%
Total responses	102,685	99%
Total population	103,720	100%
Notes: Totals greater than 100% due to multiple origin responses. Demographics based on 2022 Canadian federal electoral redistribution riding boundaries.

== History ==
Parliament	Years	Member	Party
Flamborough—Glanbrook—Brant North; Riding created from Brantford—Brant, Cambridge, and Flamborough—Glanbrook
45th	2025–present	Dan Muys	Conservative

== Electoral results ==
2025 Canadian federal election
Party	Candidate	Votes	%	±%	Expenditures
Conservative	Dan Muys	35,246	52.70	+8.92	$132,398.96
Liberal	Chuck Phillips	28,915	43.23	+10.69	$48,420.14
New Democratic	Peter Werhun	1,630	2.44	–12.18	$8,050.01
Green	Anita Payne	594	0.89	–1.55	$0.00
People's	Nikita Mahood	499	0.75	–5.78	$8,483.38
Total valid votes/expense limit		66,884	99.34	–	$133,287.78
Total rejected ballots		447	0.66		
Turnout		67,331	77.04		
Eligible voters		87,393			
Conservative notional hold		Swing		–1.26	
Source: Elections Canada

2021 federal election redistributed results
Party	Vote	%
Conservative	23,563	43.78
Liberal	17,511	32.54
New Democratic	7,866	14.62
People's	3,516	6.53
Green	1,314	2.44
Others	49	0.09

== See also ==
- List of Canadian electoral districts
