= John H. Bryden =

Canadian politician, journalist and historian (born 1943)

- Born: July 15, 1943 (age 82); Dundas, Ontario, Canada
- Occupations: Politician, journalist, historian

John H. Bryden (born July 15, 1943) is a Canadian politician, journalist, and historian.

== Education ==
Bryden received an Honours Bachelor of Arts degree in English and History from McMaster University in 1966, and a Masters of Philosophy in English from the University of Leeds in 1968.

== Early career ==
From 1969 to 1989, Bryden held a number of positions as a journalist at several Canadian newspapers including the Hamilton Spectator, The Globe and Mail and the Toronto Star.

== Political career ==
Bryden was first elected to the House of Commons of Canada as a member of the Liberal Party of Canada during the Liberal sweep of Ontario in the 1993 election.

He was re-elected in the 1997 election for the riding of Wentworth-Burlington, and again in the 2000 election, in the riding of Ancaster-Dundas-Flamborough-Aldershot.

He supported Deputy Prime Minister John Manley to succeed the retiring Jean Chrétien. This brought an end to his political career, as Manley was unable to make much headway against front runner Paul Martin, who not only had a large lead in polls but also controlled much of the party machinery. Bryden's electoral district was abolished, forcing him into an uphill battle against a Martin loyalist. In February 2004, he left the Liberal Party to join the Conservative Party of Canada, citing disagreement with the actions and policies of the newly chosen Liberal leader Martin, notably criticizing Martin's vindictiveness and blaming him for triggering the Sponsorship scandal, which proved politically disastrous for the Liberal Party. Bryden was unable to gain the Conservative nomination for his riding of Ancaster-Dundas-Flamborough-Westdale in the 2004 federal election, and he retired from politics.

== As a writer ==
To date, his books have focused on World War II, including the area of chemical and biological warfare (Deadly Allies), signal intelligence (Best Kept Secret) and German secret intelligence (Fighting To Lose). His writing career was interrupted by his political career after his first two books. He subsequently published Fighting To Lose in 2014.

=== Publications include ===
- Deadly Allies: Canada's Secret War 1937-1947, Diane Books Publishing Company, 1989. ISBN 0-7710-1724-3
- Best Kept Secret: Canadian Secret Intelligence in the Second World War, Lester, 1993. ISBN 1-895555-29-9
- Fighting To Lose: How the German Secret Intelligence Service Helped the Allies Win the Second World War, Dundurn Press, 2014. ISBN 978-1-4597-1959-0

Parliament of Canada
Preceded by Geoffrey Scott	Member of Parliament from Hamilton—Wentworth; 1993-1997	Succeeded by riding abolished
Preceded by riding created	Member of Parliament from Wentworth—Burlington; 1997-2000	Succeeded by riding abolished
Preceded by riding created	Member of Parliament from Ancaster—Dundas—Flamborough—Aldershot; 2000-2004	Succeeded by riding abolished
