= Dan Muys =

Canadian politician (born 1970)

Dan Muys MP

Member of Parliament for Flamborough—Glanbrook—Brant North Flamborough—Glanbrook (2021–2025)
- Incumbent
- Assumed office September 20, 2021
- Preceded by: David Sweet

Personal details
- Born: December 25, 1970 (age 55) Copetown, Ontario, Canada
- Party: Conservative
- Profession: Communications/PR professional

Dan Muys (born December 25, 1970) is a Canadian politician and public relations consultant who serves in the House of Commons of Canada as the Member of Parliament for Flamborough—Glanbrook—Brant North.

A member of the Conservative Party of Canada, he was elected in the 2021 Canadian federal election.

Prior to being elected, Muys worked behind the scenes politically for many years. From 2008–2020, he was the Chief of Staff for his predecessor, former MP David Sweet. He has held office positions at Queen’s Park and on Parliament Hill, including the provincial Minister’s Office for Economic Development, Job Creation & Trade, and for Brian Mulroney-era federal trade minister Michael Wilson. He is also the Ontario PC Party Regional Vice President for South Central Ontario.

Muys worked in the private sector for 20 years as a public relations and communications consultant, mostly in the sectors of agriculture, agri-food and energy. His work included large-scale projects with Cargill and TransCanada (now TC Energy). A Cargill campaign that he managed led to a CAMA award for public relations in 2004.

His community involvement includes serving as a board member for both the Royal Botanical Gardens and Canadian Public Relations Society, as well as membership with the Ancaster Rotary Club.

In 2021, Muys was acclaimed as the federal Conservative candidate for Flamborough-Glanbrook upon the retirement of David Sweet.

Muys currently serves as Associate Shadow Minister for Transport. He previously served as the Deputy Shadow Minister for Infrastructure and Communities.

He is married and lives in Lynden, Ontario.

== Electoral record ==
2025 Canadian federal election: Flamborough—Glanbrook—Brant North
Party	Candidate	Votes	%	±%	Expenditures
Conservative	Dan Muys	35,246	52.70	+8.92	$132,398.96
Liberal	Chuck Phillips	28,915	43.23	+10.69	$48,420.14
New Democratic	Peter Werhun	1,630	2.44	–12.18	$8,050.01
Green	Anita Payne	594	0.89	–1.55	$0.00
People's	Nikita Mahood	499	0.75	–5.78	$8,483.38
Total valid votes/expense limit		66,884	99.34	–	$133,287.78
Total rejected ballots		447	0.66		
Turnout		67,331	77.04		
Eligible voters		87,393			
Conservative notional hold		Swing		–1.26	
Source: Elections Canada

2021 Canadian federal election: Flamborough—Glanbrook
Party	Candidate	Votes	%	±%	Expenditures
Conservative	Dan Muys	24,370	40.57	+1.35	$116,881.82
Liberal	Vito Sgro	21,350	35.54	-1.04	$93,270.60
New Democratic	Lorne Newick	9,409	15.66	-0.84	$7,701.15
People's	Bill Panchyshyn	3,686	6.14	+4.57	$1,804.90
Green	Thomas Hatch	1254	2.07	-4.06	$2,724.93
Total valid votes/expense limit		60,069	99.27	-0.12	$120,288.26
Total rejected ballots		439	0.73	+0.12	
Turnout		60,508	65.45	-4.60	
Eligible voters		92,527			
Source: Elections Canada Elections Canada
