= Ancaster—Dundas—Flamborough—Westdale (federal electoral district) =

Former federal electoral district in Ontario, Canada

Coordinates: 43.2605°N 80.0251°W

Ontario electoral district
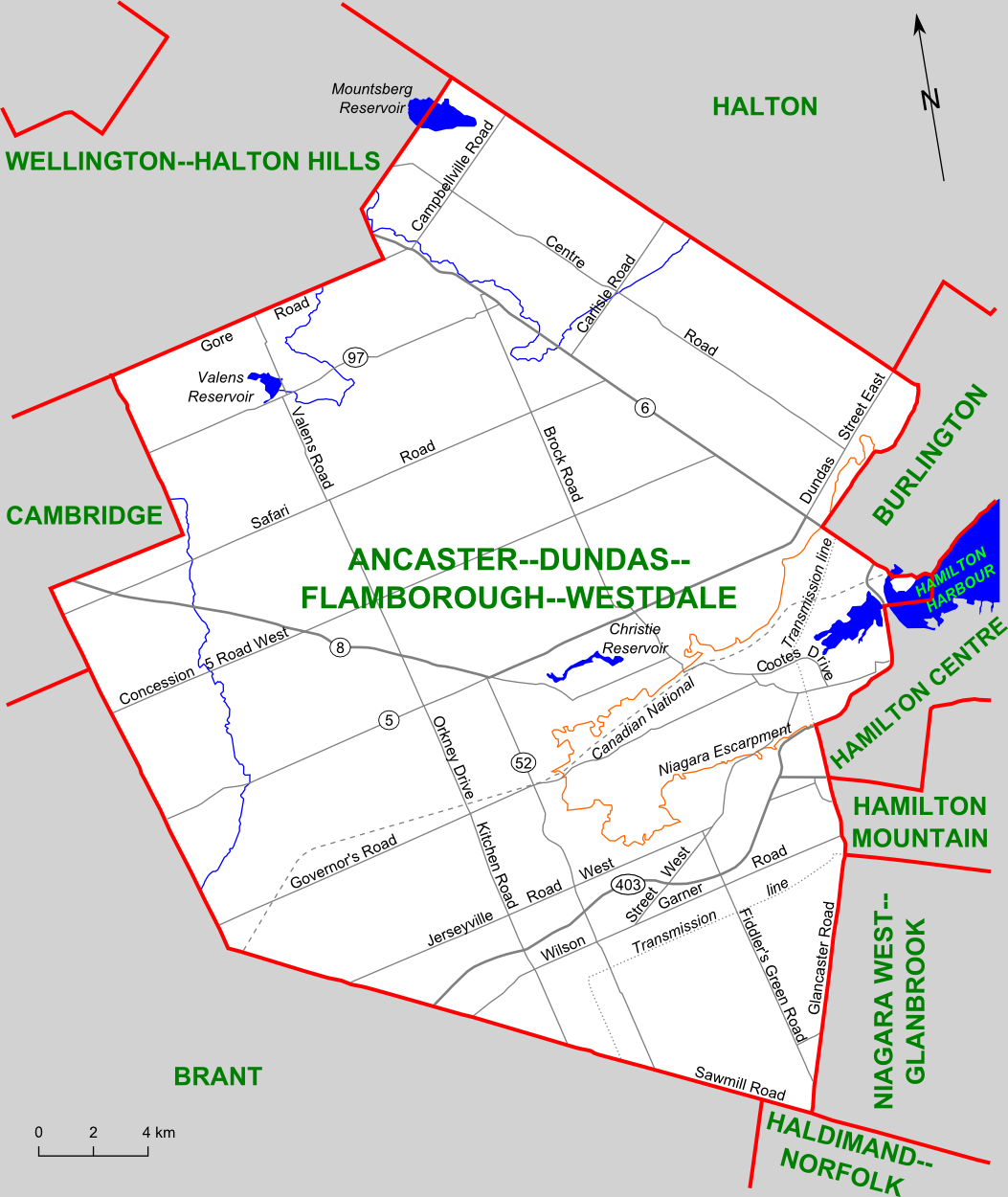
- Map of riding

Defunct federal electoral district
- Legislature: House of Commons
- District created: 2003
- District abolished: 2013
- First contested: 2004
- Last contested: 2011
- District webpage: profile, map

Demographics
- Population (2011): 116,357
- Electors (2011): 85,039
- Area (km²): 698.66
- Census division: Hamilton
- Census subdivision: Hamilton

Ancaster—Dundas—Flamborough—Westdale was a federal electoral district in Ontario, Canada, that has been represented in the House of Commons of Canada from 2004 until the electoral boundaries were redrawn for the 2015 election.

The district included the western half of the amalgamated city of Hamilton but did not include any of the city centre. It did, however, include McMaster University, Redeemer University College and many of the neighbourhoods surrounding it.

== History ==
The electoral district was created in 2003. 82.9% of the riding came from its predecessor riding, Ancaster—Dundas—Flamborough—Aldershot and 17.1% from Hamilton West. Conversely, Ancaster—Dundas—Flamborough—Aldershot was carved out of Hamilton—Wentworth in 1996. Hamilton—Wentworth was created in 1968 from parts of Wentworth and Hamilton South.

Hamilton—Wentworth initially consisted of:

(a) the eastern part of the City of Hamilton (east of a line drawn from north to south along Parkdale Avenue, west along the Canadian National Railway line, south along Strathearne Avenue, west along Roxborough Avenue, south along Kenilworth Avenue, the brow of the Mountain and Mountain Brow Boulevard, east along Mud Street to the east limit of the City of Hamilton);

(b) the Townships of Ancaster, Binbrook and Saltfleet and the southern part of the Township of Glanford (south of County Suburban Road No. 22)

In 1976, it was redefined to consist of the Townships of Flamborough and Glanbrook, the Towns of Ancaster and Dundas, and the southern part of the City of Hamilton (lying south of a line drawn from west to east along Limeridge Road, south along Mountain Brow Boulevard, north along Red Hill Creek, east along the brow of the Mountain to the east city limit.

In 1987, it was redefined to consist of the towns of Ancaster, Dundas and Flamborough, the township of Glanbrook, and the southern part of the City of Hamilton (lying south of a line drawn from east to west along the brow of the Niagara Escarpment, south along Redhill Creek, north along Mountain Brow Boulevard, west along Limeridge Road to St. Jerome School, west to Garth Street, south along Garth Street, and west along the proposed Mountain Freeway to the west city limit.)

Hamilton—Wentworth was abolished in 1996 when much of the riding became the new Wentworth—Burlington riding, with some parts going to Hamilton Mountain, Hamilton West and Stoney Creek.

Ancaster—Dundas—Flamborough—Aldershot consisted of the now former towns of Ancaster, Dundas and Flamborough plus that part of Burlington contained in the community of Aldershot (which it gained from Halton. Upon the 2003 redistribution, the riding lost Aldershot but gained the Ainslie Wood and Westdale neighbourhoods of Hamilton.

Following the 2012 Redistribution Order, the riding will be dissolved and split between Flamborough—Glanbrook and Hamilton West-Ancaster-Dundas.

== Demographics ==
Ethnic groups: 92.7% White, 2.1% East Asian, 1.6% South Asian
Languages: 83.4% English, 1.1% French, 14.7% Other
Religions: 45.0% Protestant, 27.7% Catholic, 1.6% Christian Orthodox, 2.7% Other Christian, 1.8% Jewish, 1.2% Muslim, 18.6% No affiliation
Average income: $37,986

== Riding associations ==
Riding associations are the local branches of the national political parties:

Party	Association name	CEO	HQ address	HQ city
Conservative Party of Canada	Ancaster—Dundas—Flamborough—Westdale Conservative Association			Ancaster
Green	Ancaster—Dundas—Flamborough—Westdale Federal Green Party Association	Joan Krygsman	257 MacNab Street	Dundas
Liberal Party of Canada	Ancaster—Dundas—Flamborough—Westdale Federal Liberal Association	Peter Greenberg	19 Monarch Court	Dundas
New Democratic Party	Ancaster—Dundas—Flamborough—Westdale Federal NDP Riding Association	Patricia Strung	178 Central Drive	Ancaster

== Member of Parliament ==
This riding has elected the following members of Parliament:

Parliament	Years	Member	Party
Hamilton—Wentworth; Riding created from Wentworth and Hamilton South
28th	1968–1972	Colin D. Gibson	Liberal
29th	1972–1974	Sean O'Sullivan	Progressive Conservative
30th	1974–1977	Sean O'Sullivan	Progressive Conservative
30th	1978–1979	Geoffrey Scott	Progressive Conservative
31st	1979–1980	Geoffrey Scott	Progressive Conservative
32nd	1980–1984	Geoffrey Scott	Progressive Conservative
33rd	1984–1988	Geoffrey Scott	Progressive Conservative
34th	1988–1993	Geoffrey Scott	Progressive Conservative
35th	1993–1997	John H. Bryden	Liberal
Wentworth—Burlington
36th	1997–2000	John H. Bryden	Liberal
Ancaster—Dundas—Flamborough—Aldershot
37th	2000–2004	John H. Bryden	Liberal
37th	2004–2004	John H. Bryden	Independent
37th	2004–2004	John H. Bryden	Conservative
Ancaster—Dundas—Flamborough—Westdale
38th	2004–2006	Russ Powers	Liberal
39th	2006–2008	David Sweet	Conservative
40th	2008–2011	David Sweet	Conservative
41st	2011–2015	David Sweet	Conservative
Riding dissolved into Hamilton West—Ancaster—Dundas and Flamborough—Glanbrook

== Election results ==
=== Ancaster—Dundas—Flamborough—Westdale (2004–2011) ===
2011 Canadian federal election
Party	Candidate	Votes	%	±%
Conservative	David Sweet	30,240	51.25	+4.75
Liberal	Dave Braden	14,594	24.74	-2.35
New Democratic	Nancy MacBain	10,956	18.57	+1.54
Green	Peter Ormond	2,963	5.02	-4.08
Libertarian	Anthony Giles	170	0.29	–
Marxist–Leninist	Jamilé Ghaddar	77	0.13	-0.13
Total valid votes/Expense limit		59,000	100.00	
Total rejected ballots		193	0.33	+0.03
Turnout		59,193	69.38	+2.68
Conservative hold		Swing		+3.55

2008 Canadian federal election
Party	Candidate	Votes	%	±%	Expenditures
Conservative	David Sweet	26,297	46.50	+7.4	$69,185
Liberal	Arlene MacFarlane-VanderBeek	15,322	27.09	-7.4	$42,231
New Democratic	Gordon Guyatt	9,632	17.03	-4.3	$44,859
Green	Peter Ormond	5,149	9.10	+4.7	$21,445
Marxist–Leninist	Jamilé Ghaddar	148	0.26	+0.1	
Total valid votes/Expense limit		56,548	100.00	$88,494	
Total rejected ballots		170	0.30		
Total number of votes		56,718	66.70		

2006 Canadian federal election
Party	Candidate	Votes	%	±%
Conservative	David Sweet	24,530	39.1%	+4.5%
Liberal	Russ Powers	21,656	34.5%	-5.2%
New Democratic	Gordon Guyatt	13,376	21.3%	+0.4%
Green	David Januczkowski	2,767	4.4%	-0.4%
Independent	Ben Cowie	303	0.5%	-
Marxist–Leninist	Jamilé Ghaddar	112	0.2%	-
Total number of valid votes		62,744	100.0%	
Rejected ballots		175		
Total number of votes		62,919		

2004 Canadian federal election
Party	Candidate	Votes	%
Liberal	Russ Powers	21,935	39.7%
Conservative	David Sweet	19,135	34.6%
New Democratic	Gordon Guyatt	11,557	20.9%
Green	David Januczkowski	2,636	4.8%
Total number of valid votes		55,263	100%
Rejected ballots		252	
Total number of votes		55,515	

=== Ancaster—Dundas—Flamborough—Aldershot (2000–2004) ===
2000 Canadian federal election
Party	Candidate	Votes	%
Liberal	John H. Bryden	19,921	41.16
Alliance	Ray Pennings	15,272	31.55
Progressive Conservative	Gerry Aggus	9,451	19.53
New Democratic	Gordon Guyatt	3,756	7.76

=== Wentworth—Burlington (1997–2000) ===
1997 Canadian federal election
Party	Candidate	Votes	%
Liberal	John H. Bryden	19,584	41.65
Progressive Conservative	Gerry Aggus	13,481	28.67
Reform	Allan Lonn	10,267	21.83
New Democratic	Jessica Brennan	3,694	7.86

=== Hamilton—Wentworth (1968–1997) ===
1993 Canadian federal election
Party	Candidate	Votes	%
Liberal	John H. Bryden	29,695	45.81
Reform	Mark Mullins	16,545	25.52
Progressive Conservative	Ray Johnson	14,539	22.43
New Democratic	Rick McCall	2,555	3.94
National	Ralph Ellis	672	1.04
Christian Heritage	Rien Van Den Enden	460	0.71
Natural Law	Norm Sinclair	353	0.54

1988 Canadian federal election
Party	Candidate	Votes	%
Progressive Conservative	Geoff Scott	23,876	41.88
Liberal	Colin Gibson	19,373	33.98
New Democratic	Julia McCrea	8,989	15.77
Christian Heritage	Ray Pennings	4,113	7.21
Rhinoceros	David Cheeko Zuliniak	662	1.16

1984 Canadian federal election
Party	Candidate	Votes	%
Progressive Conservative	Geoff Scott	25,595	52.00
Liberal	Eric Gordon Cunningham	14,193	28.84
New Democratic	David Hitchcock	8,836	17.95
Green	Bill Santor	333	0.68
Libertarian	Edward B. Hughes	172	0.35
Commonwealth of Canada	Ed Gardner	88	0.18

1980 Canadian federal election
Party	Candidate	Votes	%
Progressive Conservative	Geoff Scott	18,918	44.98
Liberal	Bill Charlton	13,704	32.58
New Democratic	David Hitchcock	9,392	22.33
Marxist–Leninist	Frances Pattison	46	0.11

1979 Canadian federal election
Party	Candidate	Votes	%
Progressive Conservative	Geoff Scott	22,369	52.84
Liberal	Jim Bennett	11,343	28.60
New Democratic	David Hitchcock	8,550	20.20
Marxist–Leninist	Ann Boylan	69	0.16

On the resignation of Mr. O'Sullivan, 14 September 1977:

By-election on 16 October 1978
Party	Candidate	Votes	%	±%
Progressive Conservative	Geoff Scott	20,263	47.18	
New Democratic	Ken Lee	14,105	32.84	
Liberal	Jim Bennett	8,282	19.28	
Communist	Bob Jaggard	301	0.70	

1974 Canadian federal election
Party	Candidate	Votes	%
Progressive Conservative	Sean O'Sullivan	18,874	39.51
Liberal	Norm Curry	17,869	37.40
New Democratic	Bob Mackenzie	11,029	23.09

1972 Canadian federal election
Party	Candidate	Votes	%
Progressive Conservative	Sean O'Sullivan	18,611	38.51
Liberal	Colin David Gibson	14,755	30.53
New Democratic	Bob Mackenzie	14,520	30.05
Independent	Ron McCann	294	0.61
Social Credit	A.J. Sid Hamelin	143	0.30

1968 Canadian federal election
Party	Candidate	Votes	%
Liberal	Colin David Gibson	14,979	39.53
New Democratic	Gordon Stewart Vichert	12,852	33.92
Progressive Conservative	Jim Ridge	10,059	26.55

== See also ==
- List of Canadian electoral districts
- Historical federal electoral districts of Canada
