= Flamborough—Glanbrook (federal electoral district) =

Federal electoral district in Ontario, Canada

Coordinates: 43.161°N 79.917°W

Ontario electoral district
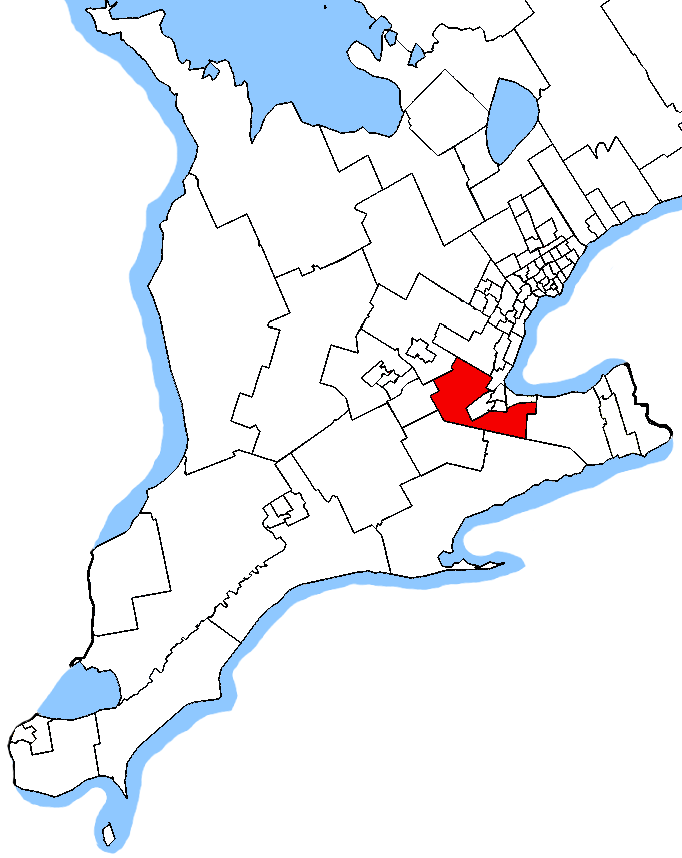
- Map of southwestern Ontario showing the location of Flamborough—Glanbrook

Federal electoral district
- Legislature: House of Commons
MP
Dan Muys
Conservative
- District created: 2013
- District abolished: 2023
- First contested: 2015
- Last contested: 2021
- District webpage: profile, map

Demographics
- Population (2011): 97,081
- Electors (2015): 77,774
- Area (km²): 941
- Pop. density (per km²): 103.2
- Census division: Hamilton
- Census subdivision: Hamilton

Flamborough—Glanbrook is a former federal electoral district in Ontario, Canada, that was represented in the House of Commons of Canada from 2015 to 2025.

== Geography ==
Flamborough—Glanbrook was created by the 2012 federal electoral boundaries redistribution and was legally defined in the 2013 representation order as the area commencing at the intersection of the easterly limit of the city with the Niagara Escarpment, westerly along said escarpment to Redhill Creek, westerly along the creek to Mountain Brow Boulevard, southerly along said boulevard to Arbour Road, southerly along said road, its intermittent production, Anchor Road and its southerly production to the intersection of Rymal Road East with Glover Road, westerly along Rymal Road East, Rymal Road West and Garner Road East to Glancaster Road, southerly along said road to the electric power transmission line situated northerly of Grassyplain Drive, westerly along said transmission line to Trinity Road, northerly along said road and Highway No. 52 North to the Canadian National Railway, easterly along said railway to Highway No. 403, northeasterly along said highway to the northerly limit of Hamilton, and then in an uneven manner to the point of commencement.

== Demographics ==
According to the 2021 Canadian census

Languages: 74.7% English, 2.0% Arabic, 1.7% Italian, 1.4% Punjabi, 1.4% Urdu, 1.3% Spanish, 1.3% Polish, 1.2% Portuguese, 1.0% French
Religions: 61.3% Christian (31.2% Catholic, 4.5% United Church, 4.0% Anglican, 3.1% Christian Orthodox, 2.2% Reformed, 1.9% Presbyterian, 1.4% Pentecostal, 1.3% Baptist, 11.7% Other), 6.2% Muslim, 1.8% Hindu, 1.8% Sikh, 27.7% None
Median income: $46,800 (2020)
Average income: $59,750 (2020)

Panethnic groups in Flamborough—Glanbrook (2011−2021)
Panethnic group	2021		2016		2011	
Panethnic group	Pop.	%	Pop.	%	Pop.	%
European (Note: Statistic includes all persons that did not make up part of a visible minority or an indigenous identity.)	96,305	77.41%	93,650	85.06%	87,030	90.14%
South Asian	9,180	7.38%	4,215	3.83%	2,095	2.17%
African	4,680	3.76%	2,540	2.31%	1,630	1.69%
Middle Eastern (Note: Statistic includes total responses of "West Asian" and "Arab" under visible minority section on census.)	4,470	3.59%	2,655	2.41%	1,445	1.5%
Southeast Asian (Note: Statistic includes total responses of "Filipino" and "Southeast Asian" under visible minority section on census.)	2,650	2.13%	1,690	1.53%	1,245	1.29%
Latin American	1,920	1.54%	1,315	1.19%	545	0.56%
East Asian (Note: Statistic includes total responses of "Chinese", "Korean", and "Japanese" under visible minority section on census.)	1,745	1.4%	1,340	1.22%	935	0.97%
Indigenous	1,710	1.37%	1,625	1.48%	1,175	1.22%
Other/multiracial (Note: Statistic includes total responses of "Visible minority, n.i.e." and "Multiple visible minorities" under visible minority section on census.)	1,745	1.4%	1,060	0.96%	460	0.48%
Total responses	124,405	98.98%	110,105	99.14%	96,550	99.45%
Total population	125,692	100%	111,065	100%	97,081	100%
Notes: Totals greater than 100% due to multiple origin responses. Demographics based on 2012 Canadian federal electoral redistribution riding boundaries.

== History ==
Flamborough—Glanbrook came into effect upon the call of the 42nd Canadian federal election, scheduled for October 2015. It was created out of parts of the electoral districts of Ancaster—Dundas—Flamborough—Westdale, Niagara West—Glanbrook and Hamilton Mountain. The riding was abolished upon the call of the 2025 federal election due to the 2022 redistribution process, with the majority of its territory becoming part of the new Flamborough—Glanbrook—Brant North riding.

=== Members of Parliament ===
This riding has elected the following members of Parliament:

Parliament	Years	Member	Party
Flamborough—Glanbrook; Riding created from Ancaster—Dundas—Flamborough—Westdale, Hamilton Mountain, and Niagara West—Glanbrook
42nd	2015–2019	David Sweet	Conservative
43rd	2019–2021	David Sweet	Conservative
44th	2021–2025	Dan Muys	Conservative
Riding dissolved into Flamborough—Glanbrook—Brant North, Hamilton East—Stoney Creek, Hamilton Mountain, and Hamilton West—Ancaster—Dundas

== Election results ==
View source data.
Graph of election results in Flamborough—Glanbrook (minor parties that never got 2% of the vote or didn't run consistently are omitted)

2021 Canadian federal election
Party	Candidate	Votes	%	±%	Expenditures
Conservative	Dan Muys	24,370	40.57	+1.35	$116,881.82
Liberal	Vito Sgro	21,350	35.54	-1.04	$93,270.60
New Democratic	Lorne Newick	9,409	15.66	-0.84	$7,701.15
People's	Bill Panchyshyn	3,686	6.14	+4.57	$1,804.90
Green	Thomas Hatch	1254	2.07	-4.06	$2,724.93
Total valid votes/expense limit		60,069	99.27	-0.12	$120,288.26
Total rejected ballots		439	0.73	+0.12	
Turnout		60,508	65.45	-4.60	
Eligible voters		92,527			
Source: Elections Canada Elections Canada

2019 Canadian federal election
Party	Candidate	Votes	%	±%	Expenditures
Conservative	David Sweet	24,527	39.22	-4.26	$113,962.62
Liberal	Jennifer Stebbing	22,875	36.58	-2.57	$55,126.88
New Democratic	Allison Cillis	10,322	16.50	+2.49	$12,541.49
Green	Janet Errygers	3,833	6.13	+2.77	$1,506.25
People's	David Tilden	982	1.57	-	none listed
Total valid votes/expense limit		62,539	99.39		
Total rejected ballots		381	0.61	+0.21	
Turnout		62,920	70.05	-0.14	
Eligible voters		89,823			
Conservative hold		Swing		-0.85	
Source: Elections Canada

2015 Canadian federal election
Party	Candidate	Votes	%	±%	Expenditures
Conservative	David Sweet	24,137	43.48	-11.92	$157,159.87
Liberal	Jennifer Stebbing	21,728	39.14	+22.24	$37,599.55
New Democratic	Mike DiLivio	7,779	14.01	-8.78	$2,280.27
Green	Dave Allan Urquhart	1,866	3.36	-0.80	$2,276.63
Total valid votes/expense limit		55,510	99.61		$213,168.27
Total rejected ballots		220	0.39	–	
Turnout		55,730	70.19	–	
Eligible voters		79,397			
Conservative hold		Swing		-17.08	
Source: Elections Canada

2011 federal election redistributed results
Party	Vote	%
Conservative	25,143	55.40
New Democratic	10,344	22.79
Liberal	7,671	16.90
Green	1,890	4.16
Others	337	0.74

== See also ==
- List of Canadian electoral districts
- Historical federal electoral districts of Canada
