= Strength in Democracy candidates in the 2015 Canadian federal election =

This is a list of nominated candidates for the Strength in Democracy party in the 2015 Canadian federal election.

== Candidate statistics ==
| Candidates Nominated | Male Candidates | Female Candidates | Most Common Occupation |
|---|---|---|---|
| 16 | 9 | 7 | MP |

== Newfoundland and Labrador - 1 seat ==
| Riding | Candidate's Name | Notes | Gender | Residence | Occupation | Votes | % | Rank |
|---|---|---|---|---|---|---|---|---|
| Avalon | Jennifer McCreath | | F | St. John's | Public servant | 80 | 0.2% | 6th |

== Ontario - 1 seat ==
| Riding | Candidate's Name | Notes | Gender | Residence | Occupation | Votes | % | Rank |
|---|---|---|---|---|---|---|---|---|
| Peterborough—Kawartha | Toban Leckie | | M | | Small business | 131 | 0.2% | 5th |

== Quebec - 14 seats ==
| Riding | Candidate's Name | Notes | Gender | Residence | Occupation | Votes | % | Rank |
|---|---|---|---|---|---|---|---|---|
| Avignon—La Mitis—Matane—Matapédia | Jean-François Fortin | Party Leader, incumbent Member of Parliament for Haute-Gaspésie—La Mitis—Matane—Matapédia, elected as a member of the Bloc Québécois in 2011 | M | | Professor of political science, MP | | | |
| Beauport—Côte-de-Beaupré—Île d'Orléans—Charlevoix | Mario Desjardins Pelchat | | M | | Mail delivery business | | | |
| Beauport—Limoilou | Bladimir Laborit | | M | | | | | |
| Brome—Missisquoi | Patrick Paine | | M | | Consultant in international business | | | |
| Honoré-Mercier | Dayana Dejean | | F | | Financial advisor | | | |
| La Pointe-de-l'Île | Jean-François Larose | Incumbent Member of Parliament for Repentigny, elected as a member of the NDP in 2011 | M | | Security officer, MP | | | |
| Longueuil—Saint-Hubert | Affine Lwalalika | | F | | | | | |
| Louis-Hébert | Danielle Provost | | F | | Artist | | | |
| Montcalm | Manon Perreault | Incumbent Member of Parliament, elected as a member of the NDP in 2011 | F | | Administrator, MP | | | |
| Pontiac | Pascal Médieu | | M | Gatineau | Diplomat in international development | | | |
| Québec | Danielle Provost | | F | | Artist | | | |
| Repentigny | Johnathan Cloutier | | M | | Real estate broker | | | |
| Salaberry—Suroît | Patricia Domingos | Leader of the Parti équitable, former mayor of Sainte-Justine-de-Newton, 2013 candidate for leadership of the Green Party of Quebec, 2012 independent and 2014 Parti équitable provincial candidate in Soulanges | F | | Financial controller | | | |
| Terrebonne | Louis Clément Sénat | | M | | Financial advisor | | | |

== See also ==
- Results of the Canadian federal election, 2015
- Results by riding for the Canadian federal election, 2015
