= Results breakdown of the 2015 Canadian federal election =

Results of the 42nd Canadian federal election

2015 Canadian federal election
- 19 October 2015
Party	Leader	Vote %	Seats	+/–
Liberal	Justin Trudeau	39.5%	184	+148
Conservative	Stephen Harper	31.9%	99	−60
New Democratic	Tom Mulcair	19.7%	44	−51
Bloc Québécois	Gilles Duceppe	4.7%	10	+8
Green	Elizabeth May	3.5%	1	−1
This lists parties that won seats. See the complete results below.
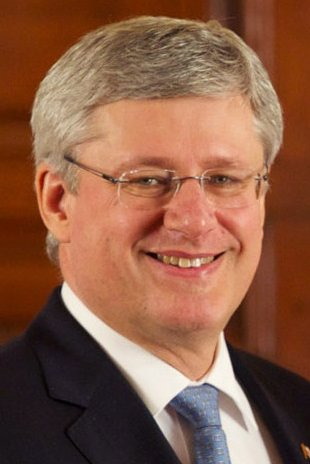

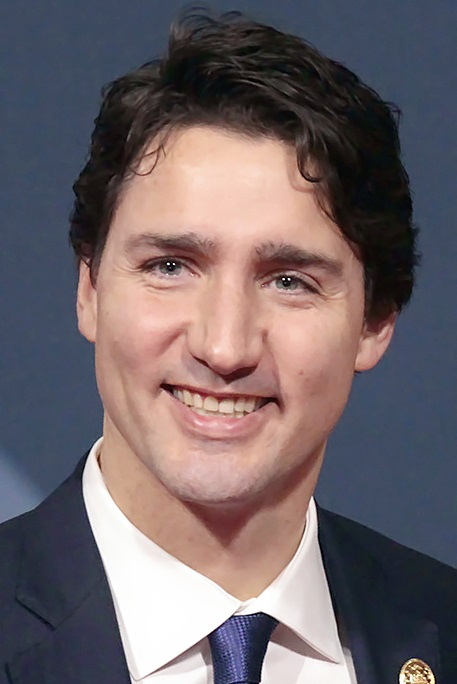
Prime Minister before	Prime Minister after
Stephen Harper; Conservative	Justin Trudeau; Liberal

The 42nd Canadian federal election was held on October 19, 2015. The incumbent Conservative Party of Canada of Prime Minister Stephen Harper, in office since 2006, was defeated by the Liberal Party of Canada under the leadership of Justin Trudeau. The Liberals rebounded from third place in the House of Commons with 36 seats to a strong majority government with 184 of the 338 seats in the expanded Commons. The Liberals picked up 148 seats, easily the biggest numerical increase for a Canadian party since Confederation.

== Summary ==
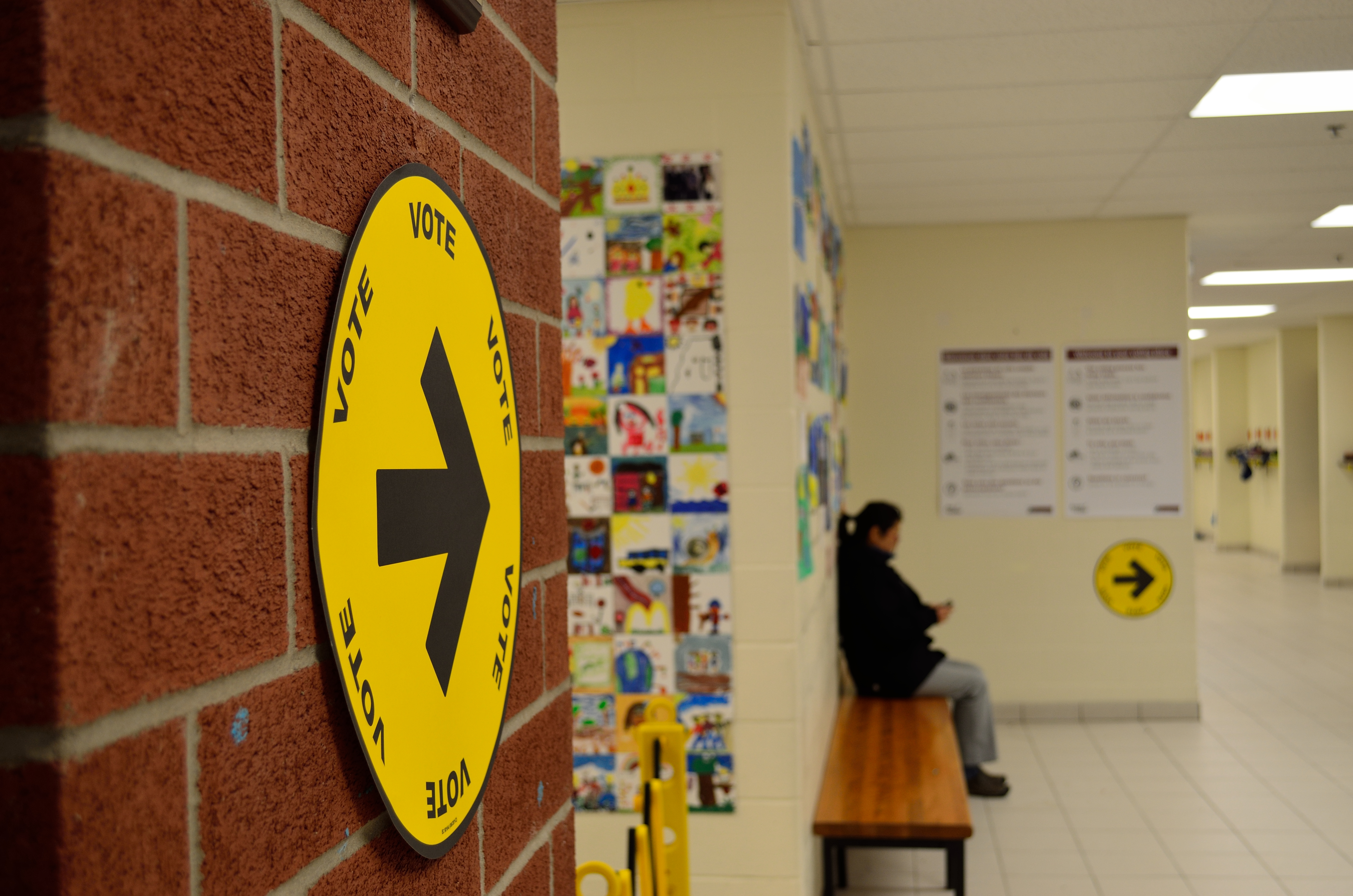
A polling station on election day

At 9:41pm EDT, October 19, 2015, CBC News projected that the Liberals had won at least a minority government, and that leader Justin Trudeau would become the next Prime Minister of Canada. Less than an hour later, at 10:36pm EDT, CBC News projected a Liberal majority. The New Democratic Party lost more than half the seats they had held, with Tom Mulcair becoming the first major party leader to concede defeat. The Conservatives dropped down to 99 seats to form the main opposition party, and Stephen Harper resigned as leader of the Conservative Party. The Bloc Québécois regained some ridings they had lost in the previous election, but party leader Giles Duceppe failed to regain the seat he lost back in 2011. Green Party leader Elizabeth May kept her seat.

According to preliminary figures from Elections Canada, more than 68 per cent of eligible voters cast a ballot, or about 17,546,697 registered electors—a seven percentage point increase from the 2011 federal election, when turnout was just more than 61 per cent.

=== Synopsis of results ===
Results by riding - 2015 Canadian federal election
Riding	Prov/ Terr	2011 (Redist.)		Winning party					Turnout (Note: including spoilt ballots)	Votes (Note: minor political parties receiving less than 1% of the national popular vote are aggregated under "Other"; independent candidates are aggregated separately)							
Riding	Prov/ Terr	Type (Note: Effect of redistribution: NEW - new riding; MRG - merger of ridings; ORG - boundaries unchanged; CHG - boundaries and 1st place results changed; MOD - only boundaries changed)	Party	Party	Votes	Share	Margin #	Margin %	Turnout	Lib	Con	NDP	BQ	Green	Ind	Other	Total (Note: valid ballots)
Banff—Airdrie	AB	MOD	Con	Con	42,228	63.4%	24,848	37.3%	71.8%	17,380	42,228	4,521	–	2,509	–	–	66,638
Battle River—Crowfoot	AB	MOD	Con	Con	47,552	80.9%	42,047	71.5%	72.1%	5,505	47,552	3,844	–	1,868	–	–	58,769
Bow River	AB	NEW	Con	Con	38,701	77.4%	31,861	63.7%	65.9%	6,840	38,701	2,622	–	919	543	363	49,988
Calgary Centre	AB	MOD	Con	Lib	28,496	46.5%	750	1.2%	70.1%	28,496	27,746	3,412	–	1,347	248	–	61,249
Calgary Confederation	AB	MOD	Con	Con	30,669	45.9%	1,586	2.4%	73.6%	29,083	30,669	4,770	–	2,146	–	140	66,808
Calgary Forest Lawn	AB	MOD	Con	Con	19,694	48.0%	4,932	12.0%	54.9%	14,762	19,694	4,006	–	1,229	–	1,356	41,047
Calgary Heritage	AB	MOD	Con	Con	37,263	63.8%	22,091	37.8%	72.6%	15,172	37,263	4,255	–	1,246	248	246	58,430
Calgary Midnapore	AB	MOD	Con	Con	42,415	66.7%	28,019	44.1%	72.6%	14,396	42,415	4,915	–	1,691	–	145	63,562
Calgary Nose Hill	AB	MOD	Con	Con	32,760	60.0%	18,089	33.2%	66.7%	14,671	32,760	4,836	–	1,384	–	911	54,562
Calgary Rocky Ridge	AB	NEW	Con	Con	38,229	60.4%	18,191	28.7%	72.1%	20,038	38,229	3,665	–	1,360	–	–	63,292
Calgary Shepard	AB	NEW	Con	Con	43,706	65.9%	27,327	41.2%	67.9%	16,379	43,706	4,532	–	1,734	–	–	66,351
Calgary Signal Hill	AB	MOD	Con	Con	37,858	60.6%	18,750	30.0%	73.3%	19,108	37,858	3,128	–	1,586	–	839	62,519
Calgary Skyview	AB	MOD	Con	Lib	20,644	45.9%	2,759	6.1%	60.7%	20,644	17,885	3,605	–	846	182	1,831	44,993
Edmonton Centre	AB	MOD	Con	Lib	19,902	37.2%	1,199	2.2%	67.0%	19,902	18,703	13,084	–	1,403	163	257	53,512
Edmonton Griesbach	AB	MOD	Con	Con	19,157	40.0%	2,848	5.9%	59.1%	10,397	19,157	16,309	–	1,129	–	950	47,942
Edmonton Manning	AB	NEW	Con	Con	22,166	45.2%	8,657	17.7%	60.5%	13,509	22,166	11,582	–	1,079	540	125	49,001
Edmonton Mill Woods	AB	MOD	Con	Lib	20,423	41.2%	92	0.2%	66.6%	20,423	20,331	6,330	–	1,096	560	777	49,517
Edmonton Riverbend	AB	MOD	Con	Con	28,805	49.9%	11,377	19.7%	70.4%	17,428	28,805	9,846	–	1,275	–	386	57,740
Edmonton Strathcona	AB	MOD	NDP	NDP	24,446	44.0%	7,051	12.7%	71.0%	11,524	17,395	24,446	–	1,278	223	738	55,604
Edmonton West	AB	MOD	Con	Con	26,370	49.3%	7,721	14.4%	66.2%	18,649	26,370	6,955	–	1,037	–	446	53,457
Edmonton—Wetaskiwin	AB	NEW	Con	Con	44,949	65.8%	30,289	44.3%	67.9%	14,660	44,949	6,645	–	1,595	–	495	68,344
Foothills	AB	MOD	Con	Con	46,166	75.7%	38,017	62.3%	73.1%	8,149	46,166	3,919	–	1,983	–	769	60,986
Fort McMurray—Cold Lake	AB	MOD	Con	Con	28,625	60.6%	15,222	32.2%	60.8%	13,403	28,625	3,663	–	743	–	832	47,266
Grande Prairie-Mackenzie	AB	MOD	Con	Con	38,895	72.9%	31,076	58.3%	64.7%	7,819	38,895	4,343	–	1,673	–	613	53,343
Lakeland	AB	MRG	Con	Con	39,882	72.8%	32,382	59.1%	68.9%	7,500	39,882	5,513	–	1,283	–	601	54,779
Lethbridge	AB	MOD	Con	Con	32,321	56.8%	20,647	36.3%	67.7%	10,532	32,321	11,674	–	1,461	–	955	56,943
Medicine Hat—Cardston—Warner	AB	MOD	Con	Con	34,849	68.8%	25,764	50.9%	65.2%	9,085	34,849	4,897	–	1,319	500	–	50,650
Peace River—Westlock	AB	NEW	Con	Con	34,342	69.4%	27,215	55.0%	64.1%	6,360	34,342	7,127	–	1,247	–	443	49,519
Red Deer—Lacombe	AB	MOD	Con	Con	43,599	70.7%	34,364	55.7%	69.4%	9,235	43,599	7,055	–	1,773	–	–	61,662
Red Deer—Mountain View	AB	MOD	Con	Con	46,245	74.3%	37,889	60.9%	70.6%	8,356	46,245	5,233	–	1,621	–	757	62,212
St. Albert—Edmonton	AB	MOD	Con	Con	26,783	45.2%	13,440	22.7%	69.7%	13,343	26,783	6,609	–	821	11,652	–	59,208
Sherwood Park—Fort Saskatchewan	AB	MOD	Con	Con	42,642	63.9%	29,027	43.5%	74.1%	13,615	42,642	6,540	–	1,648	1,563	678	66,686
Sturgeon River—Parkland	AB	NEW	Con	Con	43,220	70.2%	33,634	54.7%	70.9%	9,586	43,220	6,166	–	1,875	–	690	61,537
Yellowhead	AB	MOD	Con	Con	37,950	72.3%	30,483	58.0%	69.3%	7,467	37,950	4,753	–	1,538	–	817	52,525
Abbotsford	BC	MOD	Con	Con	23,229	48.3%	7,452	15.5%	69.7%	15,777	23,229	6,593	–	2,416	–	109	48,124
Burnaby North—Seymour	BC	CHG	Con	Lib	18,938	36.1%	3,401	6.5%	70.3%	18,938	14,612	15,537	–	2,765	207	423	52,480
Burnaby South	BC	NEW	NDP	NDP	16,094	35.1%	547	1.2%	60.8%	15,547	12,441	16,094	–	1,306	–	499	45,887
Cariboo—Prince George	BC	MOD	Con	Con	19,688	36.6%	2,767	5.1%	67.8%	16,921	19,688	13,879	–	1,860	1,059	327	53,734
Central Okanagan—Similkameen—Nicola	BC	MOD	Con	Con	24,517	39.6%	1,458	2.4%	71.0%	23,059	24,517	11,961	–	2,436	–	–	61,973
Chilliwack—Hope	BC	MOD	Con	Con	21,445	42.3%	4,331	8.5%	69.7%	17,114	21,445	9,218	–	2,386	–	498	50,661
Cloverdale—Langley City	BC	NEW	Con	Lib	24,617	45.5%	5,817	10.8%	69.4%	24,617	18,800	8,463	–	2,195	–	–	54,075
Coquitlam—Port Coquitlam	BC	MOD	Con	Lib	19,938	35.3%	1,855	3.3%	66.7%	19,938	18,083	15,400	–	2,076	–	1,014	56,511
Courtenay—Alberni	BC	MOD	Con	NDP	26,582	38.1%	6,868	9.8%	75.9%	15,212	19,714	26,582	–	8,201	–	140	69,849
Cowichan—Malahat—Langford	BC	MOD	NDP	NDP	22,200	35.9%	7,515	12.2%	75.7%	14,685	14,091	22,200	–	10,462	–	340	61,778
Delta	BC	NEW	Con	Lib	27,355	49.1%	9,100	16.3%	74.5%	27,355	18,255	8,311	–	1,768	–	–	55,689
Esquimalt—Saanich—Sooke	BC	MOD	NDP	NDP	23,836	35.0%	5,214	7.7%	75.0%	18,622	11,912	23,836	–	13,575	–	136	68,081
Fleetwood—Port Kells	BC	MOD	Con	Lib	22,871	46.9%	8,596	17.6%	65.2%	22,871	14,275	10,463	–	1,154	–	–	48,763
Kamloops—Thompson—Cariboo	BC	MOD	Con	Con	24,595	35.3%	3,129	4.5%	73.4%	21,215	24,595	21,466	–	2,489	–	–	69,765
Kelowna—Lake Country	BC	MOD	Con	Lib	29,614	46.2%	4,112	6.4%	70.7%	29,614	25,502	9,039	–	–	–	–	64,155
Kootenay—Columbia	BC	MOD	Con	NDP	23,529	37.2%	282	0.4%	73.0%	12,315	23,247	23,529	–	4,115	–	–	63,206
Langley—Aldergrove	BC	MOD	Con	Con	27,333	45.6%	5,439	9.1%	72.4%	21,894	27,333	7,490	–	2,644	–	535	59,896
Mission—Matsqui—Fraser Canyon	BC	NEW	Con	Lib	16,625	37.2%	1,038	2.3%	70.4%	16,625	15,587	9,174	–	2,293	914	58	44,651
Nanaimo—Ladysmith	BC	NEW	NDP	NDP	23,651	33.2%	6,898	9.7%	75.0%	16,753	16,637	23,651	–	14,074	–	126	71,241
New Westminster—Burnaby	BC	MOD	NDP	NDP	22,876	43.5%	7,623	14.5%	65.9%	15,253	10,512	22,876	–	2,487	–	1,514	52,642
North Island—Powell River	BC	MOD	Con	NDP	24,340	40.2%	8,500	14.0%	74.6%	15,416	15,840	24,340	–	4,940	–	–	60,536
North Okanagan—Shuswap	BC	MOD	Con	Con	27,490	39.3%	6,541	9.4%	71.9%	20,949	27,490	17,907	–	3,608	–	–	69,954
North Vancouver	BC	MOD	Con	Lib	36,458	56.7%	19,157	29.8%	75.8%	36,458	17,301	5,015	–	5,350	94	136	64,354
Pitt Meadows—Maple Ridge	BC	MOD	Con	Lib	17,673	33.9%	1,300	2.5%	72.0%	17,673	16,373	15,450	–	2,202	452	–	52,150
Port Moody—Coquitlam	BC	CHG	Con	NDP	19,706	36.0%	2,818	5.2%	68.9%	16,888	16,112	19,706	–	1,878	–	83	54,667
Prince George—Peace River—Northern Rockies	BC	MOD	Con	Con	27,237	52.5%	14,324	27.6%	66.5%	12,913	27,237	8,014	–	2,672	–	1,023	51,859
Richmond Centre	BC	MOD	Con	Con	17,622	44.2%	1,136	2.8%	57.5%	16,486	17,622	4,602	–	1,152	–	–	39,862
Saanich—Gulf Islands	BC	MOD	Grn	Grn	37,070	54.4%	23,810	34.9%	78.7%	11,380	13,260	6,181	–	37,070	–	249	68,140
Skeena—Bulkley Valley	BC	MOD	NDP	NDP	22,531	51.1%	11,595	26.3%	68.3%	8,257	10,936	22,531	–	1,605	–	780	44,109
South Okanagan—West Kootenay	BC	CHG	Con	NDP	24,823	37.3%	4,952	7.4%	72.6%	18,732	19,871	24,823	–	2,792	376	–	66,594
South Surrey—White Rock	BC	MOD	Con	Con	24,934	44.0%	1,439	2.5%	74.0%	23,495	24,934	5,895	–	1,938	–	369	56,631
Steveston—Richmond East	BC	MOD	Con	Lib	19,486	45.1%	2,856	6.6%	60.2%	19,486	16,630	5,248	–	1,587	–	274	43,225
Surrey Centre	BC	MOD	NDP	Lib	19,471	45.1%	6,479	15.0%	60.5%	19,471	8,556	12,992	–	1,493	–	686	43,198
Surrey—Newton	BC	MOD	NDP	Lib	24,869	56.0%	13,267	29.9%	67.9%	24,869	6,978	11,602	–	975	–	–	44,424
Vancouver Centre	BC	MOD	Lib	Lib	32,554	56.1%	20,936	36.1%	65.9%	32,554	9,818	11,618	–	3,370	–	688	58,048
Vancouver East	BC	ORG	NDP	NDP	29,316	49.9%	12,784	21.8%	66.2%	16,532	6,322	29,316	–	5,395	216	927	58,708
Vancouver Granville	BC	NEW	Con	Lib	23,643	43.9%	9,181	17.1%	67.1%	23,643	14,028	14,462	–	1,691	–	–	53,824
Vancouver Kingsway	BC	MOD	NDP	NDP	20,763	45.7%	8,138	17.9%	63.3%	12,625	9,538	20,763	–	1,476	–	994	45,396
Vancouver Quadra	BC	MOD	Lib	Lib	31,102	58.7%	17,419	32.9%	69.9%	31,102	13,683	5,748	–	2,229	59	151	52,972
Vancouver South	BC	MOD	Con	Lib	21,773	48.8%	6,658	14.9%	63.2%	21,773	15,115	6,230	–	1,149	–	344	44,611
Victoria	BC	ORG	NDP	NDP	30,397	42.3%	6,731	9.4%	76.2%	8,489	8,480	30,397	–	23,666	124	739	71,895
West Vancouver—Sunshine Coast—Sea to Sky Country	BC	MOD	Con	Lib	36,300	54.6%	18,889	28.4%	73.6%	36,300	17,411	6,554	–	5,907	–	286	66,458
Brandon—Souris	MB	MOD	Con	Con	20,666	50.3%	5,328	13.0%	67.3%	15,338	20,666	2,576	–	2,526	–	–	41,106
Charleswood—St. James—Assiniboia—Headingley	MB	ORG	Con	Lib	24,531	52.0%	6,123	13.0%	73.9%	24,531	18,408	2,842	–	1,376	–	–	47,157
Churchill—Keewatinook Aski	MB	MOD	NDP	NDP	13,487	45.0%	912	3.0%	58.1%	12,575	3,090	13,487	–	537	–	255	29,944
Dauphin—Swan River—Neepawa	MB	MOD	Con	Con	19,276	46.3%	7,000	16.8%	65.3%	12,276	19,276	5,097	–	1,592	3,357	–	41,598
Elmwood—Transcona	MB	MOD	Con	NDP	14,709	34.1%	61	0.1%	65.6%	12,713	14,648	14,709	–	1,016	–	–	43,086
Kildonan—St. Paul	MB	MOD	Con	Lib	18,717	42.7%	1,239	2.8%	70.7%	18,717	17,478	6,270	–	783	142	485	43,875
Portage—Lisgar	MB	MOD	Con	Con	25,060	60.8%	14,439	35.1%	65.4%	10,621	25,060	2,554	–	1,637	–	1,315	41,187
Provencher	MB	MOD	Con	Con	25,086	56.1%	9,577	21.4%	67.9%	15,509	25,086	2,371	–	1,779	–	–	44,745
Saint Boniface—Saint Vital	MB	MOD	Con	Lib	28,530	58.4%	14,525	29.8%	74.0%	28,530	14,005	5,169	–	1,119	–	–	48,823
Selkirk—Interlake—Eastman	MB	MOD	Con	Con	25,617	51.9%	10,109	20.5%	68.6%	15,508	25,617	5,649	–	1,707	–	882	49,363
Winnipeg Centre	MB	ORG	NDP	Lib	18,471	54.5%	8,981	26.5%	60.0%	18,471	4,189	9,490	–	1,379	–	356	33,885
Winnipeg North	MB	CHG	NDP	Lib	23,402	68.9%	18,209	53.6%	58.4%	23,402	5,193	4,543	–	826	–	–	33,964
Winnipeg South	MB	MOD	Con	Lib	28,096	58.3%	11,387	23.6%	74.9%	28,096	16,709	2,404	–	990	–	–	48,199
Winnipeg South Centre	MB	MOD	Con	Lib	31,993	59.7%	16,891	31.5%	76.3%	31,993	15,102	4,799	–	1,677	–	–	53,571
Acadie—Bathurst	NB	MOD	NDP	Lib	25,845	50.7%	5,766	11.3%	76.8%	25,845	3,852	20,079	–	1,187	–	–	50,963
Beauséjour	NB	MOD	Lib	Lib	36,534	69.0%	28,525	53.9%	79.6%	36,534	6,017	8,009	–	2,376	–	–	52,936
Fredericton	NB	MOD	Con	Lib	23,016	49.3%	9,736	20.8%	75.7%	23,016	13,280	4,622	–	5,804	–	–	46,722
Fundy Royal	NB	MOD	Con	Lib	19,136	40.9%	1,775	3.8%	74.6%	19,136	17,361	8,204	–	1,823	296	–	46,820
Madawaska—Restigouche	NB	MOD	Con	Lib	20,778	55.7%	11,108	29.8%	74.0%	20,778	6,151	9,670	–	707	–	–	37,306
Miramichi—Grand Lake	NB	MOD	Con	Lib	17,202	47.3%	4,726	13.0%	75.8%	17,202	12,476	5,588	–	1,098	–	–	36,364
Moncton—Riverview—Dieppe	NB	MOD	Con	Lib	30,054	57.8%	18,886	36.3%	72.7%	30,054	11,168	8,420	–	2,399	–	–	52,041
New Brunswick Southwest	NB	MOD	Con	Lib	16,656	43.9%	2,031	5.4%	73.7%	16,656	14,625	4,768	–	1,877	–	–	37,926
Saint John—Rothesay	NB	MOD	Con	Lib	20,634	48.8%	7,719	18.3%	68.8%	20,634	12,915	7,411	–	1,321	–	–	42,281
Tobique—Mactaquac	NB	MOD	Con	Lib	17,909	46.6%	3,684	9.6%	71.4%	17,909	14,225	4,334	–	1,959	–	–	38,427
Avalon	NL	CHG	Con	Lib	23,528	55.9%	16,027	38.1%	61.7%	23,528	4,670	6,075	–	228	7,501	84	42,086
Bonavista—Burin—Trinity	NL	MOD	Lib	Lib	28,704	81.8%	25,170	71.7%	56.5%	28,704	3,534	2,557	–	297	–	–	35,092
Coast of Bays—Central—Notre Dame	NL	MOD	Lib	Lib	26,523	74.8%	20,044	56.5%	55.4%	26,523	6,479	2,175	–	271	–	–	35,448
Labrador	NL	ORG	Con	Lib	8,878	71.8%	7,099	57.4%	62.0%	8,878	1,716	1,779	–	–	–	–	12,373
Long Range Mountains	NL	MOD	Lib	Lib	30,889	73.9%	25,804	61.7%	58.3%	30,889	5,085	4,739	–	1,111	–	–	41,824
St. John's East	NL	MOD	NDP	Lib	20,974	46.7%	646	1.4%	67.9%	20,974	2,938	20,328	–	500	–	140	44,880
St. John's South—Mount Pearl	NL	MOD	NDP	Lib	25,922	57.9%	9,455	21.1%	66.5%	25,922	2,047	16,467	–	365	–	–	44,801
Cape Breton—Canso	NS	MOD	Lib	Lib	32,163	74.4%	25,917	59.9%	71.6%	32,163	6,246	3,547	–	1,281	–	–	43,237
Central Nova	NS	MOD	Con	Lib	25,909	58.5%	14,491	32.7%	73.4%	25,909	11,418	4,532	–	1,834	570	–	44,263
Cumberland—Colchester	NS	MOD	Con	Lib	29,527	63.7%	17,270	37.3%	71.0%	29,527	12,257	2,647	–	1,650	251	–	46,332
Dartmouth—Cole Harbour	NS	MOD	NDP	Lib	30,407	58.2%	17,650	33.8%	71.2%	30,407	7,331	12,757	–	1,775	–	–	52,270
Halifax	NS	MOD	NDP	Lib	27,431	51.7%	8,269	15.6%	72.6%	27,431	4,564	19,162	–	1,745	–	130	53,032
Halifax West	NS	MOD	Lib	Lib	34,377	68.6%	26,540	53.0%	71.3%	34,377	7,837	5,894	–	1,971	–	–	50,079
Kings—Hants	NS	ORG	Lib	Lib	33,026	70.7%	24,349	52.2%	69.8%	33,026	8,677	2,998	–	1,569	232	184	46,686
Sackville—Preston—Chezzetcook	NS	MOD	NDP	Lib	23,161	48.0%	6,548	13.6%	71.3%	23,161	7,186	16,613	–	1,341	–	–	48,301
South Shore—St. Margarets	NS	MOD	Con	Lib	30,045	56.9%	18,140	34.4%	69.6%	30,045	11,905	8,883	–	1,534	257	151	52,775
Sydney—Victoria	NS	ORG	Lib	Lib	29,995	73.2%	24,644	60.1%	68.7%	29,995	4,360	5,351	–	1,026	–	242	40,974
West Nova	NS	ORG	Con	Lib	28,775	63.0%	16,859	36.9%	68.5%	28,775	11,916	3,084	–	1,904	–	–	45,679
Ajax	ON	MOD	Con	Lib	31,458	55.9%	12,084	21.5%	66.3%	31,458	19,374	4,630	–	788	57	56,307	
Algoma—Manitoulin—Kapuskasing	ON	MOD	NDP	NDP	16,516	39.9%	2,405	5.8%	65.7%	14,111	9,820	16,516	–	927	–	–	41,374
Aurora—Oak Ridges—Richmond Hill	ON	NEW	Con	Lib	24,132	47.3%	1,093	2.1%	64.7%	24,132	23,039	2,912	–	654	–	243	50,980
Barrie—Innisfil	ON	MOD	Con	Con	22,901	46.4%	4,593	9.3%	64.1%	18,308	22,901	5,812	–	1,991	–	329	49,341
Barrie—Springwater—Oro-Medonte	ON	NEW	Con	Con	21,091	41.7%	86	0.2%	66.7%	21,005	21,091	5,202	–	2,648	188	401	50,535
Bay of Quinte	ON	MOD	Con	Lib	29,281	50.7%	9,500	16.5%	68.1%	29,281	19,781	7,001	–	1,278	372	–	57,713
Beaches—East York	ON	ORG	NDP	Lib	27,458	49.4%	10,345	18.6%	72.0%	27,458	9,124	17,113	–	1,433	297	105	55,530
Brampton Centre	ON	NEW	Con	Lib	19,277	48.6%	5,932	15.0%	60.9%	19,277	13,345	5,993	–	844	–	173	39,632
Brampton East	ON	CHG	NDP	Lib	23,652	52.3%	13,010	28.8%	65.7%	23,652	10,642	10,400	–	512	–	–	45,206
Brampton North	ON	MOD	Con	Lib	23,297	48.4%	7,409	15.4%	65.4%	23,297	15,888	7,946	–	915	–	120	48,166
Brampton South	ON	NEW	Con	Lib	23,681	52.1%	7,752	17.1%	62.6%	23,681	15,929	4,843	–	1,011	–	–	45,464
Brampton West	ON	MOD	Con	Lib	24,256	55.9%	11,188	25.8%	60.6%	24,256	13,068	5,400	–	674	–	–	43,398
Brantford—Brant	ON	MOD	Con	Con	25,874	40.9%	6,452	10.2%	65.2%	19,422	25,874	15,715	–	1,582	164	515	63,272
Bruce—Grey—Owen Sound	ON	ORG	Con	Con	26,297	46.7%	4,418	7.8%	68.5%	21,879	26,297	6,270	–	1,887	–	–	56,333
Burlington	ON	MOD	Con	Lib	32,229	46.0%	2,449	3.5%	73.2%	32,229	29,780	6,381	–	1,710	–	–	70,100
Cambridge	ON	MOD	Con	Lib	23,024	43.2%	2,411	4.5%	64.1%	23,024	20,613	7,397	–	1,723	474	108	53,339
Carleton	ON	NEW	Con	Con	27,762	46.9%	1,849	3.1%	80.1%	25,913	27,762	3,632	–	1,932	–	–	59,239
Chatham-Kent—Leamington	ON	MOD	Con	Con	21,677	41.7%	2,326	4.5%	65.5%	19,351	21,677	9,549	–	1,394	–	–	51,971
Davenport	ON	ORG	NDP	Lib	21,947	44.3%	1,441	2.9%	67.0%	21,947	5,233	20,506	–	1,530	107	261	49,584
Don Valley East	ON	CHG	Lib	Lib	24,048	57.8%	11,893	28.6%	65.8%	24,048	12,155	4,307	–	1,078	–	–	41,588
Don Valley North	ON	NEW	Con	Lib	23,494	51.4%	6,215	13.6%	63.1%	23,494	17,279	3,896	–	1,018	–	–	45,687
Don Valley West	ON	MOD	Con	Lib	27,472	53.8%	8,266	16.2%	72.2%	27,472	19,206	3,076	–	848	75	409	51,086
Dufferin—Caledon	ON	ORG	Con	Con	27,977	46.3%	4,334	7.2%	65.5%	23,643	27,977	4,398	–	4,433	–	–	60,451
Durham	ON	MOD	Con	Con	28,967	45.1%	6,018	9.4%	68.5%	22,949	28,967	10,289	–	1,616	–	364	64,185
Eglinton—Lawrence	ON	ORG	Con	Lib	27,278	48.9%	3,490	6.3%	71.5%	27,278	23,788	3,505	–	799	–	422	55,792
Elgin—Middlesex—London	ON	MOD	Con	Con	28,023	49.2%	10,381	18.2%	68.5%	17,642	28,023	8,771	–	1,783	–	714	56,933
Essex	ON	MOD	Con	NDP	25,072	41.4%	3,470	5.7%	65.7%	12,639	21,602	25,072	–	1,141	–	77	60,531
Etobicoke Centre	ON	MOD	Con	Lib	32,612	52.8%	9,542	15.4%	70.2%	32,612	23,070	4,886	–	856	–	378	61,802
Etobicoke North	ON	MOD	Lib	Lib	26,251	62.4%	16,578	39.4%	60.5%	26,251	9,673	5,220	–	524	164	232	42,064
Etobicoke—Lakeshore	ON	MOD	Con	Lib	34,638	53.7%	13,706	21.2%	69.0%	34,638	20,932	7,030	–	1,507	–	401	64,508
Flamborough—Glanbrook	ON	NEW	Con	Con	24,137	43.5%	2,409	4.3%	70.2%	21,728	24,137	7,779	–	1,866	–	–	55,510
Glengarry—Prescott—Russell	ON	MOD	Con	Lib	34,189	53.3%	10,822	16.9%	75.1%	34,189	23,367	5,087	–	1,153	–	377	64,173
Guelph	ON	ORG	Lib	Lib	34,303	49.1%	15,896	22.8%	71.3%	34,303	18,407	8,392	–	7,909	–	857	69,868
Haldimand—Norfolk	ON	MOD	Con	Con	24,714	44.1%	4,227	7.5%	67.7%	20,487	24,714	7,625	–	1,857	423	884	55,990
Haliburton—Kawartha Lakes—Brock	ON	MOD	Con	Con	27,718	44.8%	8,084	13.1%	67.6%	19,634	27,718	12,012	–	2,470	–	–	61,834
Hamilton Centre	ON	MOD	NDP	NDP	18,719	45.6%	5,001	12.2%	59.4%	13,718	6,018	18,719	–	1,778	186	664	41,083
Hamilton East—Stoney Creek	ON	MOD	NDP	Lib	19,622	39.0%	3,157	6.3%	62.8%	19,622	12,715	16,465	–	1,305	–	225	50,332
Hamilton Mountain	ON	MOD	NDP	NDP	18,146	35.9%	1,213	2.4%	65.6%	16,933	12,991	18,146	–	1,283	–	1,201	50,554
Hamilton West—Ancaster—Dundas	ON	MOD	Con	Lib	29,694	47.7%	9,873	15.9%	72.5%	29,694	19,821	10,131	–	2,633	–	–	62,279
Hastings—Lennox and Addington	ON	NEW	Con	Lib	21,104	42.4%	225	0.5%	68.5%	21,104	20,879	6,348	–	1,466	–	–	49,797
Humber River—Black Creek	ON	ORG	Lib	Lib	23,995	66.9%	16,767	46.8%	57.5%	23,995	7,228	3,851	–	584	–	201	35,859
Huron—Bruce	ON	ORG	Con	Con	26,174	44.9%	3,045	5.2%	72.4%	23,129	26,174	7,544	–	1,398	–	–	58,245
Kanata—Carleton	ON	MOD	Con	Lib	32,477	51.3%	7,648	12.1%	79.0%	32,477	24,829	4,313	–	1,704	–	–	63,323
Kenora	ON	MOD	Con	Lib	10,918	35.5%	498	1.6%	69.7%	10,918	8,751	10,420	–	501	162	–	30,752
King—Vaughan	ON	NEW	Con	Lib	25,908	47.4%	1,738	3.2%	63.8%	25,908	24,170	3,571	–	1,037	–	–	54,686
Kingston and the Islands	ON	MOD	Lib	Lib	36,421	55.4%	21,493	32.7%	70.3%	36,421	14,928	11,185	–	2,933	–	305	65,772
Kitchener Centre	ON	MOD	Con	Lib	25,504	48.8%	9,632	18.4%	67.5%	25,504	15,872	8,680	–	1,597	–	627	52,280
Kitchener South—Hespeler	ON	NEW	Con	Lib	20,215	42.3%	2,671	5.6%	65.9%	20,215	17,544	7,440	–	1,767	–	863	47,829
Kitchener—Conestoga	ON	MOD	Con	Con	20,649	43.3%	251	0.5%	69.3%	20,398	20,649	4,653	–	1,314	–	685	47,699
Lambton—Kent—Middlesex	ON	MOD	Con	Con	28,300	50.2%	11,708	20.8%	69.7%	16,592	28,300	9,598	–	1,873	–	–	56,363
Lanark—Frontenac—Kingston	ON	MOD	Con	Con	27,399	47.9%	8,074	14.1%	72.3%	19,325	27,399	8,073	–	2,025	–	418	57,240
Leeds—Grenville—Thousand Islands and Rideau Lakes	ON	ORG	Con	Con	26,738	47.4%	3,850	6.8%	71.1%	22,888	26,738	4,722	–	2,088	–	–	56,436
London North Centre	ON	MOD	Con	Lib	32,427	50.5%	12,437	19.4%	69.4%	32,427	19,990	9,423	–	2,286	–	145	64,271
London West	ON	MOD	Con	Lib	31,167	45.8%	7,131	10.5%	73.3%	31,167	24,036	10,087	–	1,918	–	819	68,027
London—Fanshawe	ON	MOD	NDP	NDP	20,684	37.8%	3,470	6.3%	63.0%	17,214	14,891	20,684	–	1,604	352	–	54,745
Markham—Stouffville	ON	MOD	Con	Lib	29,416	49.2%	3,851	6.4%	68.2%	29,416	25,565	3,647	–	1,145	–	–	59,773
Markham—Thornhill	ON	NEW	Lib	Lib	23,878	55.7%	10,029	23.4%	60.8%	23,878	13,849	4,595	–	535	–	–	42,857
Markham—Unionville	ON	MOD	Con	Con	24,605	49.4%	3,009	6.0%	60.4%	21,596	24,605	2,528	–	1,110	–	–	49,839
Milton	ON	NEW	Con	Con	22,378	45.4%	2,438	4.9%	68.5%	19,940	22,378	5,366	–	1,131	–	493	49,308
Mississauga Centre	ON	NEW	Con	Lib	28,372	54.7%	10,941	21.1%	62.3%	28,372	17,431	4,920	–	1,129	–	–	51,852
Mississauga East—Cooksville	ON	MOD	Con	Lib	28,154	54.2%	9,801	18.9%	63.1%	28,154	18,353	4,481	–	766	–	163	51,917
Mississauga—Erin Mills	ON	MOD	Con	Lib	27,520	49.7%	5,804	10.5%	66.9%	27,520	21,716	5,206	–	905	–	–	55,347
Mississauga—Lakeshore	ON	MOD	Con	Lib	28,279	47.7%	3,844	6.5%	68.7%	28,279	24,435	4,735	–	1,397	–	427	59,273
Mississauga—Malton	ON	MOD	Con	Lib	26,165	59.1%	14,464	32.7%	59.1%	26,165	11,701	5,450	–	737	203	–	44,256
Mississauga—Streetsville	ON	MOD	Con	Lib	26,792	47.8%	4,171	7.4%	67.4%	26,792	22,621	5,040	–	1,293	–	253	55,999
Nepean	ON	MOD	Con	Lib	34,017	52.4%	10,575	16.3%	77.5%	34,017	23,442	5,324	–	1,513	551	41	64,888
Newmarket—Aurora	ON	MOD	Con	Lib	25,508	45.2%	1,451	2.6%	68.1%	25,508	24,057	4,806	–	1,331	–	762	56,464
Niagara Centre	ON	MOD	NDP	Lib	19,513	35.7%	2,295	4.2%	65.6%	19,513	16,248	17,218	–	1,316	–	387	54,682
Niagara Falls	ON	ORG	Con	Con	27,235	42.1%	4,917	7.6%	63.0%	22,318	27,235	13,525	–	1,633	–	–	64,711
Niagara West	ON	MOD	Con	Con	24,732	48.8%	8,151	16.1%	73.3%	16,581	24,732	5,802	–	1,511	–	2,031	50,657
Nickel Belt	ON	MOD	NDP	Lib	21,021	42.8%	2,465	5.0%	67.1%	21,021	8,221	18,556	–	1,217	–	98	49,113
Nipissing—Timiskaming	ON	MOD	Lib	Lib	25,357	51.9%	11,032	22.6%	68.3%	25,357	14,325	7,936	–	1,257	–	–	48,875
Northumberland—Peterborough South	ON	MOD	Con	Lib	27,043	42.5%	1,878	3.0%	71.3%	27,043	25,165	9,411	–	1,990	–	–	63,609
Oakville	ON	ORG	Con	Lib	31,956	49.4%	4,459	6.9%	73.4%	31,956	27,497	3,830	–	1,420	–	–	64,703
Oakville North—Burlington	ON	MOD	Con	Lib	28,415	46.7%	2,073	3.4%	71.2%	28,415	26,342	4,405	–	968	–	666	60,796
Orléans	ON	MOD	Con	Lib	46,542	59.7%	22,721	29.1%	80.6%	46,542	23,821	6,215	–	1,410	–	–	77,988
Oshawa	ON	MOD	Con	Con	23,162	38.2%	3,823	6.3%	63.2%	16,588	23,162	19,339	–	1,522	–	75	60,686
Ottawa Centre	ON	MOD	NDP	Lib	32,211	42.7%	3,113	4.1%	80.0%	32,211	10,943	29,098	–	2,246	–	1,002	75,500
Ottawa South	ON	MOD	Lib	Lib	38,831	60.1%	23,120	35.8%	73.6%	38,831	15,711	7,480	–	1,888	–	739	64,649
Ottawa West—Nepean	ON	MOD	Con	Lib	35,199	55.9%	16,306	25.9%	74.8%	35,199	18,893	6,195	–	1,772	–	854	62,913
Ottawa—Vanier	ON	MOD	Lib	Lib	36,474	57.6%	24,280	38.3%	73.6%	36,474	12,109	12,194	–	1,947	–	631	63,355
Oxford	ON	MOD	Con	Con	25,966	45.7%	7,667	13.5%	67.9%	18,299	25,966	9,406	–	2,004	–	1,175	56,850
Parkdale—High Park	ON	ORG	NDP	Lib	24,623	42.0%	1,057	1.8%	73.3%	24,623	7,641	23,566	–	1,743	93	901	58,567
Parry Sound-Muskoka	ON	ORG	Con	Con	22,206	43.3%	2,269	4.4%	67.6%	19,937	22,206	5,183	–	3,704	–	249	51,279
Perth Wellington	ON	ORG	Con	Con	22,255	42.9%	2,775	5.4%	68.0%	19,480	22,255	7,756	–	1,347	219	794	51,851
Peterborough—Kawartha	ON	MOD	Con	Lib	29,159	43.8%	5,824	8.8%	71.6%	29,159	23,335	12,437	–	1,480	–	131	66,542
Pickering—Uxbridge	ON	MOD	Con	Lib	29,757	50.3%	7,166	12.1%	69.0%	29,757	22,591	5,446	–	1,365	–	–	59,159
Renfrew—Nipissing—Pembroke	ON	ORG	Con	Con	26,195	45.8%	7,529	13.2%	72.7%	18,666	26,195	4,893	–	1,105	6,300	–	57,159
Richmond Hill	ON	MOD	Con	Lib	23,032	46.9%	1,757	3.6%	61.1%	23,032	21,275	3,950	–	856	–	–	49,113
St. Catharines	ON	MOD	Con	Lib	24,870	43.2%	3,233	5.6%	67.7%	24,870	21,637	9,511	–	1,488	–	85	57,591
Sarnia—Lambton	ON	ORG	Con	Con	22,565	38.8%	4,463	7.7%	71.8%	15,853	22,565	18,102	–	1,605	–	–	58,125
Sault Ste. Marie	ON	MOD	Con	Lib	19,582	44.8%	5,967	13.6%	68.3%	19,582	13,615	9,543	–	934	–	83	43,757
Scarborough Centre	ON	MOD	Con	Lib	22,753	50.5%	8,048	17.9%	63.2%	22,753	14,705	5,227	–	960	–	1,384	45,029
Scarborough North	ON	MOD	NDP	Lib	18,904	48.2%	8,167	20.8%	60.0%	18,904	10,737	8,648	–	579	–	320	39,188
Scarborough Southwest	ON	MOD	NDP	Lib	25,586	52.5%	14,012	28.7%	66.7%	25,586	10,347	11,574	–	1,259	–	–	48,766
Scarborough—Agincourt	ON	MOD	Lib	Lib	21,587	51.9%	5,785	13.9%	59.4%	21,587	15,802	3,263	–	570	–	334	41,556
Scarborough-Guildwood	ON	MOD	Lib	Lib	25,167	60.0%	14,059	33.5%	64.6%	25,167	11,108	4,720	–	606	175	141	41,917
Scarborough—Rouge Park	ON	NEW	Lib	Lib	29,913	60.2%	16,326	32.9%	68.0%	29,913	13,587	5,145	–	1,010	–	–	49,655
Simcoe North	ON	MOD	Con	Con	24,836	43.5%	2,118	3.7%	65.9%	22,718	24,836	6,037	–	2,543	618	319	57,071
Simcoe—Grey	ON	MOD	Con	Con	30,612	46.6%	5,260	8.0%	67.3%	25,352	30,612	6,332	–	2,923	–	528	65,747
Spadina—Fort York	ON	MOD	NDP	Lib	30,141	54.7%	15,094	27.4%	69.3%	30,141	8,673	15,047	–	1,137	–	150	55,148
Stormont—Dundas—South Glengarry	ON	ORG	Con	Con	27,091	51.1%	6,639	12.5%	67.2%	20,452	27,091	4,332	–	1,191	–	–	53,066
Sudbury	ON	MOD	NDP	Lib	23,534	47.4%	9,741	19.6%	68.2%	23,534	10,473	13,793	–	1,509	218	102	49,629
Thornhill	ON	MOD	Con	Con	31,911	58.6%	13,516	24.8%	67.1%	18,395	31,911	2,814	–	627	–	744	54,491
Thunder Bay—Rainy River	ON	MOD	NDP	Lib	18,523	44.0%	6,040	14.4%	66.3%	18,523	8,876	12,483	–	2,201	–	–	42,083
Thunder Bay—Superior North	ON	MOD	NDP	Lib	20,069	45.0%	9,730	21.8%	68.7%	20,069	7,775	10,339	–	6,155	270	–	44,608
Timmins-James Bay	ON	MOD	NDP	NDP	15,974	42.9%	3,034	8.1%	61.1%	12,940	7,605	15,974	–	752	–	–	37,271
Toronto Centre	ON	MOD	Lib	Lib	29,297	57.9%	15,830	31.3%	69.3%	29,297	6,167	13,467	–	1,315	147	209	50,602
Toronto—Danforth	ON	ORG	NDP	Lib	23,531	42.3%	1,206	2.2%	71.1%	23,531	5,478	22,325	–	2,618	–	1,629	55,581
Toronto—St. Paul's	ON	MOD	Lib	Lib	31,481	55.3%	16,105	28.3%	72.5%	31,481	15,376	8,386	–	1,729	–	–	56,972
University—Rosedale	ON	NEW	NDP	Lib	27,849	49.8%	11,861	21.2%	72.8%	27,849	9,790	15,988	–	1,641	–	657	55,925
Vaughan—Woodbridge	ON	MOD	Con	Lib	23,041	48.7%	2,295	4.9%	63.9%	23,041	20,746	2,198	–	597	–	716	47,298
Waterloo	ON	MOD	Con	Lib	29,752	49.7%	10,434	17.4%	73.2%	29,752	19,318	8,928	–	1,713	–	138	59,849
Wellington—Halton Hills	ON	ORG	Con	Con	32,482	50.9%	9,203	14.4%	71.0%	23,279	32,482	5,321	–	2,547	–	183	63,812
Whitby	ON	MOD	Con	Lib	29,003	45.0%	1,849	2.9%	70.0%	29,003	27,154	6,677	–	1,403	279	–	64,516
Willowdale	ON	MOD	Con	Lib	24,519	53.4%	7,529	16.4%	60.6%	24,519	16,990	3,203	–	1,025	216	–	45,953
Windsor West	ON	MOD	NDP	NDP	24,085	51.3%	12,243	26.1%	54.8%	11,842	9,734	24,085	–	1,083	–	161	46,905
Windsor—Tecumseh	ON	MOD	NDP	NDP	23,215	43.5%	8,559	16.0%	61.1%	14,177	14,656	23,215	–	1,047	–	249	53,344
York Centre	ON	MOD	Con	Lib	20,131	46.9%	1,238	2.9%	65.7%	20,131	18,893	3,148	–	772	–	–	42,944
York South—Weston	ON	ORG	NDP	Lib	20,093	46.0%	6,812	15.6%	61.1%	20,093	8,399	13,281	–	892	–	1,041	43,706
York—Simcoe	ON	MOD	Con	Con	24,058	50.2%	5,975	12.5%	63.3%	18,083	24,058	4,255	–	1,483	–	–	47,879
Cardigan	PE	ORG	Lib	Lib	14,621	65.0%	10,989	48.9%	78.2%	14,621	3,632	2,503	–	1,434	–	295	22,485
Charlottetown	PE	ORG	Lib	Lib	11,910	56.3%	7,013	33.1%	75.6%	11,910	3,136	4,897	–	1,222	–	–	21,165
Egmont	PE	ORG	Con	Lib	10,521	49.3%	4,336	20.3%	77.0%	10,521	6,185	4,097	–	559	–	–	21,362
Malpeque	PE	ORG	Lib	Lib	13,950	62.1%	10,003	44.5%	78.9%	13,950	3,947	2,509	–	2,066	–	–	22,472
Abitibi—Baie-James—Nunavik—Eeyou	QC	MOD	NDP	NDP	12,778	37.0%	1,684	4.9%	55.2%	11,094	3,211	12,778	6,398	779	–	258	34,518
Abitibi—Témiscamingue	QC	MOD	NDP	NDP	20,636	41.5%	5,903	11.9%	60.8%	14,733	3,425	20,636	9,651	859	–	425	49,729
Ahuntsic-Cartierville	QC	CHG	Lib	Lib	26,026	46.8%	9,342	16.8%	67.5%	26,026	4,051	16,684	7,346	1,175	–	285	55,567
Alfred-Pellan	QC	MOD	NDP	Lib	24,557	44.5%	11,332	20.5%	71.1%	24,557	6,259	13,225	9,836	1,089	203	–	55,169
Argenteuil—La Petite-Nation	QC	MOD	NDP	Lib	22,093	43.3%	9,443	18.5%	65.5%	22,093	5,680	12,650	9,525	1,118	–	–	51,066
Avignon—La Mitis—Matane—Matapédia	QC	MOD	BQ	Lib	14,378	39.5%	6,737	18.5%	60.4%	14,378	2,228	7,340	7,641	365	–	4,404	36,356
Beauce	QC	MOD	Con	Con	32,910	58.9%	20,468	36.6%	66.0%	12,442	32,910	5,443	4,144	943	–	–	55,882
Beauport—Côte-de-Beaupré—Île d'Orléans—Charlevoix	QC	MOD	NDP	Con	16,903	33.5%	3,347	6.6%	67.0%	13,556	16,903	9,306	9,650	859	–	182	50,456
Beauport—Limoilou	QC	MOD	NDP	Con	15,461	30.6%	2,580	5.1%	65.4%	12,854	15,461	12,881	7,467	1,220	–	675	50,558
Bécancour—Nicolet—Saurel	QC	ORG	BQ	BQ	20,871	40.0%	8,205	15.7%	67.5%	12,666	5,955	11,531	20,871	1,182	–	–	52,205
Bellechasse—Les Etchemins—Lévis	QC	MOD	Con	Con	31,872	50.9%	18,911	30.2%	68.4%	12,961	31,872	8,516	7,217	2,032	–	–	62,598
Beloeil—Chambly	QC	MOD	NDP	NDP	20,641	31.1%	1,147	1.7%	73.9%	19,494	6,173	20,641	18,387	1,498	–	245	66,438
Berthier—Maskinongé	QC	MOD	NDP	NDP	22,942	42.2%	8,905	16.4%	66.6%	11,032	5,548	22,942	14,037	847	–	–	54,406
Bourassa	QC	MOD	Lib	Lib	22,234	54.1%	15,185	36.9%	59.1%	22,234	3,819	6,144	7,049	886	669	328	41,129
Brome—Missisquoi	QC	MOD	NDP	Lib	25,744	43.9%	11,361	19.4%	69.8%	25,744	6,724	14,383	10,252	1,377	–	195	58,675
Brossard—Saint-Lambert	QC	MOD	NDP	Lib	28,818	50.3%	14,743	25.7%	69.0%	28,818	7,215	14,075	6,071	1,081	–	–	57,260
Charlesbourg—Haute-Saint-Charles	QC	MOD	NDP	Con	24,608	42.2%	11,083	19.0%	69.7%	13,525	24,608	11,690	7,177	1,256	–	–	58,256
Châteauguay—Lacolle	QC	MOD	NDP	Lib	20,245	39.1%	7,630	14.7%	69.2%	20,245	5,805	11,986	12,615	982	–	149	51,782
Chicoutimi—Le Fjord	QC	MOD	NDP	Lib	13,619	31.1%	600	1.4%	66.7%	13,619	7,270	13,019	8,990	907	–	–	43,805
Compton—Stanstead	QC	MOD	NDP	Lib	20,582	36.9%	5,282	9.5%	68.8%	20,582	6,978	15,300	11,551	1,085	–	315	55,811
Dorval—Lachine—LaSalle	QC	MOD	NDP	Lib	29,974	54.9%	18,205	33.3%	64.4%	29,974	6,049	11,769	5,338	1,245	230	–	54,605
Drummond	QC	ORG	NDP	NDP	15,833	30.5%	2,040	3.9%	65.2%	13,793	9,221	15,833	11,862	1,270	–	–	51,979
Gaspésie—Les Îles-de-la-Madeleine	QC	CHG	BQ	Lib	15,345	38.7%	2,460	6.2%	60.8%	15,345	2,398	12,885	8,289	400	–	300	39,617
Gatineau	QC	MOD	NDP	Lib	31,076	53.8%	15,724	27.2%	69.1%	31,076	4,733	15,352	5,455	942	148	94	57,800
Hochelaga	QC	MOD	NDP	NDP	16,034	30.9%	500	1.0%	63.5%	15,534	3,555	16,034	14,389	1,654	–	738	51,904
Honoré-Mercier	QC	MOD	NDP	Lib	29,211	56.5%	20,733	40.1%	66.2%	29,211	6,226	8,478	6,680	814	–	249	51,658
Hull—Aylmer	QC	MOD	NDP	Lib	28,478	51.4%	11,006	19.9%	70.4%	28,478	4,278	17,472	3,625	1,035	160	392	55,440
Joliette	QC	MOD	NDP	BQ	18,875	33.3%	2,880	5.1%	67.0%	15,995	5,705	14,566	18,875	1,335	–	213	56,689
Jonquière	QC	MOD	NDP	NDP	14,039	29.2%	339	0.7%	67.0%	13,700	8,124	14,039	11,202	656	–	382	48,103
La Pointe-de-l'Île	QC	MOD	NDP	BQ	18,545	33.6%	2,768	5.0%	66.2%	15,777	4,408	14,777	18,545	1,130	–	493	55,226
La Prairie	QC	NEW	NDP	Lib	20,993	36.5%	5,886	10.2%	71.0%	20,993	6,859	13,174	15,107	1,235	–	204	57,572
Lac-Saint-Jean	QC	MOD	Con	Con	18,393	33.3%	2,658	4.8%	65.8%	10,193	18,393	15,735	10,152	806	–	–	55,279
Lac-Saint-Louis	QC	MOD	Lib	Lib	39,965	64.1%	29,108	46.7%	72.9%	39,965	10,857	7,997	1,681	1,812	–	–	62,312
LaSalle—Émard—Verdun	QC	MOD	NDP	Lib	23,603	43.9%	8,037	14.9%	64.8%	23,603	3,713	15,566	9,164	1,717	–	–	53,763
Laurentides—Labelle	QC	ORG	NDP	Lib	20,277	32.1%	1,485	2.4%	66.3%	20,277	6,209	16,644	18,792	1,251	–	–	63,173
Laurier—Sainte-Marie	QC	MOD	NDP	NDP	20,929	38.3%	5,230	9.6%	65.0%	12,938	2,242	20,929	15,699	1,904	160	809	54,681
Laval—Les Îles	QC	MOD	NDP	Lib	25,857	47.7%	15,147	27.9%	66.6%	25,857	9,811	10,710	6,731	921	–	175	54,205
Lévis—Lotbinière	QC	MOD	Con	Con	31,357	50.1%	17,795	28.4%	72.8%	13,562	31,357	9,246	7,163	1,124	–	136	62,588
Longueuil—Charles-LeMoyne	QC	MOD	NDP	Lib	18,301	35.4%	4,327	8.4%	62.8%	18,301	4,961	12,468	13,974	1,510	–	493	51,707
Longueuil—Saint-Hubert	QC	MOD	NDP	NDP	18,171	31.2%	703	1.2%	68.8%	17,468	5,087	18,171	15,873	1,447	–	153	58,199
Louis-Hébert	QC	MOD	NDP	Lib	21,516	34.8%	4,727	7.7%	76.6%	21,516	16,789	12,850	8,900	1,561	–	128	61,744
Louis-Saint-Laurent	QC	MOD	NDP	Con	32,637	50.5%	18,785	29.0%	70.9%	13,852	32,637	10,296	6,688	1,210	–	–	64,683
Manicouagan	QC	MOD	NDP	BQ	17,338	41.3%	4,995	11.9%	56.7%	12,343	4,317	7,359	17,338	673	–	–	42,030
Marc-Aurèle-Fortin	QC	MOD	NDP	Lib	22,323	40.9%	9,496	17.4%	72.4%	22,323	6,498	12,827	11,820	1,057	–	–	54,525
Mégantic—L'Érable	QC	MOD	Con	Con	16,749	35.4%	3,441	7.3%	67.3%	13,308	16,749	10,386	5,838	1,006	–	–	47,287
Mirabel	QC	NEW	NDP	BQ	18,710	31.5%	837	1.4%	68.9%	15,514	6,020	17,873	18,710	1,301	–	–	59,418
Montarville	QC	MOD	NDP	Lib	18,848	32.5%	2,388	4.1%	77.7%	18,848	6,284	14,296	16,460	1,388	–	641	57,917
Montcalm	QC	MOD	NDP	BQ	19,405	36.6%	4,921	9.3%	64.7%	14,484	5,093	12,431	19,405	976	–	620	53,009
Montmagny—L'Islet—Kamouraska—Rivière-du-Loup	QC	ORG	NDP	Con	14,274	29.0%	272	0.6%	63.6%	14,002	14,274	11,918	7,939	823	–	287	49,243
Mount Royal	QC	MOD	Lib	Lib	24,187	50.3%	5,986	12.%	65.1%	24,187	18,201	3,884	908	747	–	124	48,051
Notre-Dame-de-Grâce—Westmount	QC	MOD	Lib	Lib	29,755	57.7%	18,526	35.9%	65.0%	29,755	7,414	11,229	1,282	1,581	151	181	51,593
Outremont	QC	MOD	NDP	NDP	19,242	44.1%	4,645	10.6%	61.9%	14,597	4,159	19,242	3,668	1,575	–	378	43,619
Papineau	QC	MOD	Lib	Lib	26,391	52.0%	13,259	26.1%	65.0%	26,391	2,390	13,132	6,182	1,443	768	465	50,770
Pierre-Boucher—Les Patriotes—Verchères	QC	MOD	NDP	BQ	17,007	28.6%	213	0.4%	76.3%	16,794	6,079	14,454	17,007	5,056	–	–	59,390
Pierrefonds—Dollard	QC	ORG	NDP	Lib	34,319	58.7%	22,625	38.7%	69.0%	34,319	11,694	9,584	–	2,043	–	–	58,505
Pontiac	QC	MOD	NDP	Lib	34,154	54.5%	20,064	32.0%	71.8%	34,154	8,716	14,090	4,337	1,089	–	239	62,625
Portneuf—Jacques-Cartier	QC	ORG	NDP	Con	27,290	44.0%	13,604	21.9%	71.1%	13,322	27,290	13,686	6,665	1,096	–	–	62,059
Québec	QC	MOD	NDP	Lib	15,566	28.9%	1,000	1.9%	68.7%	15,566	11,737	14,566	10,153	1,570	–	275	53,867
Repentigny	QC	MOD	NDP	BQ	22,618	34.7%	4,820	7.4%	72.1%	17,798	7,053	15,167	22,618	1,242	–	1,333	65,211
Richmond—Arthabaska	QC	MOD	BQ	Con	18,505	31.6%	4,042	6.9%	69.3%	14,463	18,505	14,213	10,068	984	–	384	58,617
Rimouski-Neigette—Témiscouata—Les Basques	QC	ORG	NDP	NDP	19,374	43.1%	6,780	15.1%	64.7%	12,594	3,363	19,374	8,673	669	–	273	44,946
Rivière-des-Mille-Îles	QC	MOD	NDP	Lib	18,787	32.4%	1,676	2.9%	72.3%	18,787	6,099	17,111	14,755	1,136	158	–	58,046
Rivière-du-Nord	QC	MOD	NDP	BQ	18,157	32.0%	1,080	1.9%	64.4%	14,933	4,793	17,077	18,157	1,436	–	261	56,657
Rosemont—La Petite-Patrie	QC	MOD	NDP	NDP	28,672	49.2%	16,389	28.1%	69.7%	12,068	2,510	28,672	12,283	1,783	–	1,019	58,335
Saint-Hyacinthe—Bagot	QC	ORG	NDP	NDP	15,578	28.7%	598	1.1%	68.6%	14,980	9,098	15,578	13,200	1,243	270	–	54,369
Saint-Jean	QC	ORG	NDP	Lib	20,022	33.2%	2,467	4.1%	69.6%	20,022	6,549	17,555	14,979	1,281	–	–	60,386
Saint-Laurent	QC	MOD	Lib	Lib	24,832	61.6%	16,965	42.1%	58.9%	24,832	7,867	4,646	1,879	977	–	129	40,330
Saint-Léonard—Saint-Michel	QC	MOD	Lib	Lib	28,826	64.7%	22,215	49.9%	58.9%	28,826	4,957	6,611	3,204	805	–	128	44,531
Saint-Maurice—Champlain	QC	MOD	NDP	Lib	24,475	41.5%	12,230	20.7%	65.1%	24,475	9,592	12,245	11,295	1,144	–	196	58,947
Salaberry—Suroît	QC	MOD	NDP	NDP	18,726	30.4 %	771	1.3%	67.5%	17,955	6,132	18,726	17,452	867	219	184	61,535
Shefford	QC	MOD	NDP	Lib	22,957	39.0%	9,012	15.3%	68.0%	22,957	7,529	13,945	13,092	1,397	–	–	58,920
Sherbrooke	QC	MOD	NDP	NDP	21,410	37.4%	4,339	7.6%	66.3%	17,071	5,391	21,410	11,717	1,143	303	265	57,300
Terrebonne	QC	MOD	NDP	BQ	19,238	33.0%	2,922	5.0%	70.5%	16,316	6,615	14,928	19,238	1,016	–	171	58,284
Thérèse-De Blainville	QC	NEW	NDP	Lib	18,281	32.5%	3,043	5.4%	72.1%	18,281	7,000	14,022	15,238	1,352	–	355	56,248
Trois-Rivières	QC	MOD	NDP	NDP	19,193	31.8%	969	1.6%	67.2%	18,224	11,231	19,193	10,249	1,032	–	360	60,289
Vaudreuil—Soulanges	QC	MOD	NDP	Lib	30,550	46.6%	15,923	24.3%	73.0%	30,550	9,858	14,627	9,858	1,445	–	–	65,528
Ville-Marie–Le Sud-Ouest–Île-des-Sœurs	QC	MOD	NDP	Lib	25,491	50.8%	13,734	27.4%	59.0%	25,491	5,948	11,757	4,307	2,398	–	263	50,164
Vimy	QC	MOD	NDP	Lib	25,082	46.2%	13,691	25.2%	64.1%	25,082	7,262	11,391	9,068	1,280	–	260	54,343
Battlefords—Lloydminster	SK	MOD	Con	Con	20,547	61.0%	14,617	43.4%	66.5%	5,550	20,547	5,930	–	575	1,076	–	33,678
Carlton Trail—Eagle Creek	SK	MOD	Con	Con	26,004	64.7%	18,505	46.1%	71.8%	5,774	26,004	7,499	–	902	–	–	40,179
Cypress Hills—Grasslands	SK	MOD	Con	Con	25,050	69.2%	19,669	54.3%	71.4%	5,381	25,050	4,783	–	993	–	–	36,207
Desnethé—Missinippi—Churchill River	SK	MOD	Con	NDP	10,319	34.2%	82	0.3%	64.7%	10,237	9,105	10,319	–	552	–	–	30,213
Moose Jaw—Lake Centre—Lanigan	SK	MOD	Con	Con	23,273	55.5%	13,295	31.7%	72.2%	7,545	23,273	9,978	–	961	–	208	41,965
Prince Albert	SK	MOD	Con	Con	19,673	49.8%	8,429	21.3%	68.5%	7,832	19,673	11,244	–	761	–	–	39,510
Regina—Lewvan	SK	CHG	NDP	NDP	16,843	35.2%	132	0.3%	74.6%	13,143	16,711	16,843	–	839	–	298	47,834
Regina—Qu'Appelle	SK	MOD	Con	Con	16,486	44.7%	5,342	14.5%	68.3%	8,401	16,486	11,144	–	852	–	–	36,883
Regina—Wascana	SK	MOD	Lib	Lib	23,552	55.1%	10,621	24.9%	74.6%	23,552	12,931	5,362	–	878	–	–	42,723
Saskatoon West	SK	CHG	NDP	NDP	14,921	39.6%	2,520	6.7%	66.4%	9,234	12,401	14,921	–	658	–	501	37,715
Saskatoon—Grasswood	SK	MOD	Con	Con	19,166	41.6%	5,257	11.4%	77.5%	12,165	19,166	13,909	–	846	–	–	46,086
Saskatoon—University	SK	MOD	Con	Con	18,592	41.5%	4,477	10.0%	76.9%	11,287	18,592	14,115	–	686	–	93	44,773
Souris—Moose Mountain	SK	MOD	Con	Con	26,315	70.1%	21,184	56.5%	71.1%	5,076	26,315	5,131	–	994	–	–	37,516
Yorkton—Melville	SK	MOD	Con	Con	21,683	59.2%	14,287	39.0%	67.4%	6,504	21,683	7,396	–	1,030	–	–	36,613
Northwest Territories	Terr	ORG	NDP	Lib	9,172	48.3%	3,389	17.9%	63.4%	9,172	3,481	5,783	–	537	–	–	18,973
Nunavut	Terr	ORG	Con	Lib	5,619	47.1%	2,448	20.5%	59.4%	5,619	2,956	3,171	–	182	–	–	11,928
Yukon	Terr	ORG	Con	Lib	10,887	53.7%	5,959	29.4%	75.8%	10,887	4,928	3,943	–	533	–	–	20,291

= application for judicial recount dismissed
= judicial recount terminated
= results as certified by a judge

== Result overview ==
↓
184	99	44	10	1
Liberal	Conservative	New Democratic	BQ	G

=== Summary analysis ===
Party	Votes			Seats
Liberal	6,930,136	39.5%	▲20.6%	184 / 338 (54%)
Conservative	5,600,496	31.9%	▼7.7%	99 / 338 (29%)
New Democratic	3,461,262	19.7%	▼10.9%	44 / 338 (13%)
Bloc Québécois	818,652	4.7%	▼1.2%	10 / 338 (3%)
Green	605,864	3.4%	▼0.5%	1 / 338 (0.3%)

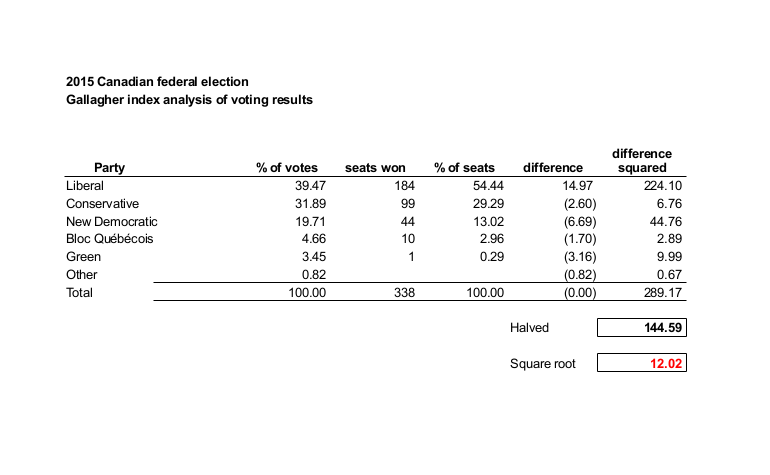
The disproportionality of parliament in the 2015 election was 12.02 according to the Gallagher Index, mainly in the Liberals' favour.

Elections to the 42nd Parliament of Canada – seats won/lost by party, 2011–2015
Party	2011 (redistributed)	Gain from (loss to)									2015
Party	2011 (redistributed)	Lib		Con		NDP		BQ		Grn	2015
Liberal	36			88		58		2			184
Conservative	188		(88)			6	(8)	1			99
New Democratic	109		(58)	8	(6)				(9)		44
Bloc Québécois	4		(2)		(1)	9					10
Green	1										1
Total	338	–	(148)	96	(7)	73	(8)	3	(9)	–	338

Party candidates in 2nd place
Party in 1st place	Party in 2nd place						Total
Party in 1st place	Lib	Con	NDP	BQ	Grn	Ind	Total
Liberal		111	64	8		1	184
Conservative	81		18				99
New Democratic	29	11		3	1		44
Bloc Québécois	8		2				10
Green		1					1
Total	118	123	84	11	1	1	338

Principal races, according to 1st and 2nd-place results
Parties		Seats
█ Liberal	█ Conservative	192
█ Liberal	█ New Democratic	93
█ Conservative	█ New Democratic	29
█ Liberal	█ Bloc Québécois	16
█ New Democratic	█ Bloc Québécois	5
█ Liberal	█ Independent	1
█ Conservative	█ Green	1
█ New Democratic	█ Green	1
Total		338

Seats won, by share of vote going to winning candidate
Party in 1st place	>50%	45-49.9%	40-44.9%	35-39.9%	<35%	Total
Liberal	87	48	26	13	10	184
Conservative	42	24	20	8	5	99
New Democratic	3	4	12	14	11	44
Bloc Québécois			2	1	7	10
Green	1					1
Total	133	76	60	36	33	338

=== Turnout ===
The election was notable for seeing voter turnout rise across all ages and sexes, and especially significant for the rise in younger voters. In particular, there was an increase of 1.2 million voters among those under the age of 35.

Voter turnout by age and sex, %, 2015 vs 2011
Age	2015			2011			∆%		
Age	Total	Male	Female	Total	Male	Female	Total	Male	Female
Canada	66.1	64.1	68.0	58.5	57.3	59.6	▲7.6	▲4.5	▲8.4
18 to 24 years	57.1	53.8	60.5	38.8	36.9	40.9	▲18.3	▲16.9	▲19.6
1st time voters	58.3	54.9	61.9	40.5	38.4	42.8	▲17.7	▲16.4	▲19.1
Not 1st time	55.1	52.0	58.3	37.8	36.0	39.8	▲17.3	▲16.0	▲18.5
25 to 34 years	57.4	54.3	60.5	45.1	42.5	47.7	▲12.3	▲11.8	▲12.8
35 to 44 years	61.9	58.7	65.1	54.5	51.5	47.5	▲7.4	▲4.2	▲17.6
45 to 54 years	66.6	63.6	69.6	64.5	62.1	66.9	▲2.1	▲1.5	▲2.7
55 to 64 years	73.7	71.4	76.0	71.5	70.7	72.2	▲2.3	▲0.7	▲3.8
65 to 74 years	78.8	79.0	78.6	75.1	77.4	73.1	▲3.7	▲1.6	▲5.5
75 years and over	67.4	74.1	62.8	60.3	69.5	54.2	▲7.1	▲4.6	▲8.6

== Geographic voting distributions ==
2015 Results by Riding and Voting Strength by Party

Seats won overall

Seats won overall, graded by strength of winning party

Bloc Québécois

Conservative

Green

Liberal

NDP
2015 Results by Riding

Seats won by riding - equal-area riding map

== Party summaries ==
=== Liberals ===
In the previous election, the Liberals were cut down to 34 seats, the fewest they had ever won in their history. It was the first time since the nation's founding that the Liberals had not been either in government or the Official Opposition. They picked up one additional seat in a by-election and one via a floor-crossing.

While the Liberals had been expected to regain much of what they had lost in 2011, they tallied the second-best performance in their history; the 184 seats was bettered only by the 191 they won in 1949. It was also the most seats that a party had won since the Progressive Conservatives won a record 211 in 1984.

The Liberal victory came mainly on the strength of a solid performance in the eastern part of the country. They took every seat in Atlantic Canada and Toronto, and won all but one seat in Ottawa. Most notably, they won 40 of Quebec's 78 seats, mostly on the strength of taking all but five seats in Montreal. It was the first time since 1980 that the Liberals had won the most seats in Quebec.

After going into the election with only four seats west of Ontario, the Liberals had their best showing in Western Canada in more than two decades. They not only took all but one seat in Winnipeg and all but two seats in Vancouver, but won seats in Alberta for the first time since 2004. Notably, they won two seats in Calgary; they had won only three seats there in their entire history prior to 2015, with their last win dating back to 1968. They were the only party to win seats in every province.

=== Conservatives ===
The Conservatives lost 60 seats to become the Official Opposition. They held their own in their heartlands of rural western Canada and central Ontario, and managed a respectable showing in southwestern Ontario and the more rural areas of eastern Ontario. However, they suffered heavy losses in urban southern Ontario, a region which had swung heavily to them in 2011. They lost all of their seats in Toronto itself and all but three in the 905 region. They also lost all of their seats in Winnipeg and Vancouver, as well as Atlantic Canada. It is the first time in decades that there are no centre-right MPs east of Quebec. They did, however, manage to make some gains in francophone areas of Quebec, mostly at the expense of the NDP.

Several members of Harper's cabinet were defeated, including Bernard Valcourt, Leona Aglukkaq, Gail Shea, Chris Alexander, Joe Oliver and Julian Fantino among others.

=== New Democrats ===
The NDP, the Official Opposition in the previous parliament, fell to third place with 44 seats, losing more than half of their caucus. For the most part, their support bled over to the Liberals, though they lost a few areas of francophone Quebec to the Conservatives and Bloc.

=== Bloc Québecois ===
The Bloc made a modest recovery after being nearly decimated in 2011, rebounding to 10 seats. However, Gilles Duceppe, who had been the longest-serving party leader in Canada at the time of his defeat in 2011, failed to win back his old seat of Laurier—Sainte-Marie. The party also received a smaller share of the popular vote than in the last election. As such, their gains could be attributable to NDP-Liberal vote splitting in francophone ridings more than a surge in popular support.

=== Contributing factors to party success ===
The parties had varying degrees of success by region and by socioeconomic factors. An analysis by The Globe and Mail shortly after the election was held revealed significant differences:

Party support arising from certain key factors by region in the Canadian general election (2015), as a proportion of the ridings won
Region	Income (Median household)			Unemployment rate		Visible minority population	
Region	<$35,810	$35,810–$141,720	>$141,720	Low (4%–6%)	High (9%–22%)	Low (<2.41%)	High (>26.8%)
Atlantic	100%	100%	100%	100%	100%	100%	100%
Quebec	50%; 27%; 14%; 9%	46%; 14%; 21%; 18%	83%; 17%	44%; 16%; 24%; 16%	71%; 21%; 4%; 4%	28%; 25%; 31%; 17%	92%; 8%
Ontario	67%; 33%	64%; 6%; 30%	69%; 2%; 29%	56%; 3%; 42%	72%; 13%; 15%	37%; 11%; 53%	91%; 2%; 7%
Prairies	33%; 33%; 33%	23%; 10%; 68%	12%; 4%; 84%	18%; 7%; 75%	67%; 33%	22%; 78%	40%; 60%
British Columbia	25%; 50%; 25%	41%; 33%; 22%; 4%	57%; 14%; 29%	53%; 26%; 16%; 5%	27%; 47%; 27%	N/A	65%; 29%; 6%
The North	100%	100%	100%	100%	100%	100%	100%

== Results by province ==
Party name		BC	AB	SK	MB	ON	QC	NB	NS	PE	NL	YT	NT	NU	Total
Liberal	Seats:	17	4	1	7	80	40	10	11	4	7	1	1	1	184
Liberal	Vote:	35.2	24.6	23.9	44.6	44.8	35.7	51.6	61.9	58.3	64.5	53.6	48.3	47.2	39.5
Conservative	Seats:	10	29	10	5	33	12	–	–	–	–	–	–	–	99
Conservative	Vote:	30.0	59.5	48.5	37.3	35.0	16.7	25.3	17.9	19.3	10.3	24.0	18.0	24.8	31.9
New Democratic Party	Seats:	14	1	3	2	8	16	–	–	–	–	–	–	–	44
New Democratic Party	Vote:	25.9	11.6	25.1	13.8	16.6	25.4	18.3	16.4	16.0	21.0	19.5	30.8	26.5	19.7
Bloc Québécois	Seats:	–	–	–	–	–	10	–	–	–	–	–	–	–	10
Bloc Québécois	Vote:	–	–	–	–	–	19.3	–	–	–	–	–	–	–	4.7
Green	Seats:	1	–	–	–	–	–	–	–	–	–	–	–	–	1
Green	Vote:	8.2	2.5	2.1	3.2	2.9	2.3	4.6	3.4	6.0	1.1	2.9	2.8	1.5	3.4
Independent and no affiliation	Vote:	0.1	0.8	0.2	0.6	0.2	0.1	0.1	0.3	–	2.9	–	–	–	0.2
Total seats		42	34	14	14	121	78	10	11	4	7	1	1	1	338

== 10 closest ridings ==
Electoral district		1st-place candidate	2nd-place candidate	Won by	Confirmed on recount
Elmwood—Transcona	MB	Daniel Blaikie	Lawrence Toet	61 votes	
Desnethé—Missinippi—Churchill River	SK	Georgina Jolibois	Lawrence Joseph	71 votes	✓
Barrie—Springwater—Oro-Medonte	ON	Alex Nuttall	Brian Tamblyn	86 votes	✓
Edmonton Mill Woods	AB	Amarjeet Sohi	Tim Uppal	92 votes	✓
Regina—Lewvan	SK	Erin Weir	Trent Fraser	132 votes	
Hastings—Lennox and Addington	ON	Mike Bossio	Daryl Kramp	225 votes	
Kitchener—Conestoga	ON	Harold Albrecht	Tim Louis	251 votes	
Montmagny—L'Islet—Kamouraska—Rivière-du-Loup	QC	Bernard Généreux	Marie-Josée Normand	272 votes	✓
Kootenay—Columbia	BC	Wayne Stetski	David Wilks	282 votes	
Jonquière	QC	Karine Trudel	Marc Pettersen	339 votes	

== Significant results among independent and minor party candidates ==
Those candidates not belonging to a major party, receiving more than 1,000 votes in the election, are listed below:

Significant vote tallies for independent and minor party candidates
Riding		Candidate		Votes	Placed
Avalon	NL	█ No Affiliation	Scott Andrews	7,501	2nd
Avignon—La Mitis—Matane—Matapédia	QC	█ Strength in Democracy	Jean-François Fortin	4,229	4th
Battlefords—Lloydminster	SK	█ Independent	Doug Anguish	1,076	4th
Coquitlam—Port Coquitlam	BC	█ Libertarian	Lewis Clarke Dahlby	1,014	5th
Dauphin—Swan River—Neepawa	MB	█ Independent	Inky Mark	3,357	4th
New Westminster—Burnaby	BC	█ Libertarian	Rex Brocki	1,368	5th
Niagara West	ON	█ Christian Heritage	Harold Jonker	1,234	5th
Oxford	ON	█ Christian Heritage	Melody Ann Aldred	1,175	5th
Portage—Lisgar	MB	█ Christian Heritage	Jerome Dondo (Note: President of the CHP)	1,315	5th
Renfrew—Nipissing—Pembroke	ON	█ Independent	Hector Clouthier	6,300	3rd
Repentigny	QC	█ Strength in Democracy	Johnathan Cloutier	1,333	5th
St. Albert—Edmonton	AB	█ Independent	Brent Rathgeber	11,652	3rd
Scarborough Centre	ON	█ Libertarian	Katerina Androutsos	1,384	4th
Sherwood Park—Fort Saskatchewan	AB	█ Independent	James Ford (Note: Had placed 2nd in the previous two elections in the former riding of Edmonton—Sherwood Park)	1,563	5th
Toronto—Danforth	ON	█ Progressive Canadian	John Richardson	1,275	5th
York South—Weston	ON	█ Libertarian	Stephen Lepone	1,041	4th

== Defeated MPs ==
- **Bold** indicates Cabinet Minister or member of Opposition shadow cabinet
- ‡ means that Incumbent was originally from a different riding

Defeated incumbents by party and province (2015)
Party	Electoral District		Incumbent	Defeated by
Conservative	Alberta	Calgary Centre	Joan Crockatt	Kent Hehr
Conservative	Alberta	Calgary Skyview	Devinder Shory	Darshan Kang
Conservative	Alberta	Edmonton Mill Woods	**Tim Uppal**‡	Amarjeet Sohi
Conservative	British Columbia	Kelowna—Lake Country	Ron Cannan	Stephen Fuhr
Conservative	British Columbia	Courtenay—Alberni	**John Duncan**‡	Gord Johns
Conservative	British Columbia	Delta	Kerry-Lynne Findlay	Carla Qualtrough
Conservative	British Columbia	Fleetwood—Port Kells	Nina Grewal	Ken Hardie
Conservative	British Columbia	North Vancouver	Andrew Saxton	Jonathan Wilkinson
Conservative	British Columbia	West Vancouver—Sunshine Coast—Sea to Sky Country	John Weston	Pamela Goldsmith-Jones
Conservative	British Columbia	Kootenay—Columbia	David Wilks	Wayne Stetski
Conservative	British Columbia	Vancouver South	Wai Young	Harjit Sajjan
Conservative	Manitoba	Winnipeg South Centre	Joyce Bateman	Jim Carr
Conservative	Manitoba	Charleswood—St. James—Assiniboia—Headingley	Steven Fletcher	Doug Eyolfson
Conservative	Manitoba	Elmwood—Transcona	Lawrence Toet	Daniel Blaikie
Conservative	New Brunswick	Fredericton	Keith Ashfield	Matt DeCourcey
Conservative	New Brunswick	Moncton—Riverview—Dieppe	Robert Goguen	Ginette Petitpas Taylor
Conservative	New Brunswick	Fundy Royal	**Rob Moore**	Alaina Lockhart
Conservative	New Brunswick	Miramichi—Grand Lake	Tilly O'Neill-Gordon	Pat Finnigan
Conservative	New Brunswick	Madawaska—Restigouche	**Bernard Valcourt**	René Arseneault
Conservative	New Brunswick	Saint John—Rothesay	Rodney Weston	Wayne Long
Conservative	New Brunswick	New Brunswick Southwest	John Williamson	Karen Ludwig
Conservative	Nova Scotia	Cumberland—Colchester	Scott Armstrong	Bill Casey
Conservative	Ontario	York Centre	Mark Adler	Michael Levitt
Conservative	Ontario	Ajax	**Chris Alexander**	Mark Holland
Conservative	Ontario	Mississauga—Lakeshore	Stella Ambler	Sven Spengemann
Conservative	Ontario	Nipissing—Timiskaming	Jay Aspin	Anthony Rota
Conservative	Ontario	Waterloo	Peter Braid	Bardish Chagger
Conservative	Ontario	Newmarket—Aurora	Lois Brown	Kyle Peterson
Conservative	Ontario	Mississauga—Streetsville	Brad Butt	Gagan Sikand
Conservative	Ontario	Markham—Stouffville	Paul Calandra	Jane Philpott
Conservative	Ontario	Don Valley West	John Carmichael	Rob Oliphant
Conservative	Ontario	Pickering—Uxbridge	Corneliu Chisu	Jennifer O'Connell
Conservative	Ontario	Don Valley North	Joe Daniel	Geng Tan
Conservative	Ontario	Mississauga—Erin Mills	Bob Dechert	Iqra Khalid
Conservative	Ontario	St. Catharines	Rick Dykstra	Chris Bittle
Conservative	Ontario	Vaughan—Woodbridge	**Julian Fantino**	Francesco Sorbara
Conservative	Ontario	Orléans	Royal Galipeau	Andrew Leslie
Conservative	Ontario	Brampton North	Parm Gill	Ruby Sahota
Conservative	Ontario	Cambridge	Gary Goodyear	Bryan May
Conservative	Ontario	Brampton Centre	**Bal Gosal**‡	Ramesh Sangha
Conservative	Ontario	Sault Ste. Marie	Bryan Hayes	Terry Sheehan
Conservative	Ontario	London West	**Ed Holder**	Kate Young
Conservative	Ontario	Scarborough Centre	Roxanne James	Salma Zahid
Conservative	Ontario	Hastings—Lennox and Addington	Daryl Kramp	Mike Bossio
Conservative	Ontario	Glengarry—Prescott—Russell	Pierre Lemieux	Francis Drouin
Conservative	Ontario	Willowdale	Chungsen Leung	Ali Ehsassi
Conservative	Ontario	Mississauga East—Cooksville	Wladyslaw Lizon	Peter Fonseca
Conservative	Ontario	Aurora—Oak Ridges—Richmond Hill	Costas Menegakis	Leona Alleslev
Conservative	Ontario	Eglinton—Lawrence	**Joe Oliver**	Marco Mendicino
Conservative	Ontario	Etobicoke Centre	Ted Opitz	Borys Wrzesnewskyj
Conservative	Ontario	Whitby	Pat Perkins	Celina Caesar-Chavannes
Conservative	Ontario	Kenora	**Greg Rickford**	Bob Nault
Conservative	Ontario	Brampton South	Kyle Seeback‡	Sonia Sidhu
Conservative	Ontario	Etobicoke—Lakeshore	Bernard Trottier	James Maloney
Conservative	Ontario	London North Centre	Susan Truppe	Peter Fragiskatos
Conservative	Ontario	Burlington	Mike Wallace	Karina Gould
Conservative	Ontario	Essex	Jeff Watson	Tracey Ramsey
Conservative	Ontario	Kitchener Centre	Stephen Woodworth	Raj Saini
Conservative	Ontario	Oakville	Terence Young	John Oliver
Conservative	Prince Edward Island	Egmont	**Gail Shea**	Bobby Morrissey
Conservative	Saskatchewan	Desnethé—Missinippi—Churchill River	Rob Clarke	Georgina Jolibois
Conservative	The North	Nunavut	**Leona Aglukkaq**	Hunter Tootoo
Conservative	The North	Yukon	Ryan Leef	Larry Bagnell
NDP				
NDP	British Columbia	Surrey Centre	**Jasbir Sandhu**	Randeep Sarai
NDP	British Columbia	Surrey—Newton	**Jinny Sims**	Sukh Dhaliwal
NDP	Manitoba	Winnipeg Centre	**Pat Martin**	Robert-Falcon Ouellette
NDP	Newfoundland and Labrador	St. John's East	**Jack Harris**	Nick Whalen
NDP	Newfoundland and Labrador	St. John's South—Mount Pearl	**Ryan Cleary**	Seamus O'Regan
NDP	Nova Scotia	Dartmouth—Cole Harbour	**Robert Chisholm**	Darren Fisher
NDP	Nova Scotia	Halifax	**Megan Leslie**	Andy Fillmore
NDP	Nova Scotia	Sackville—Preston—Chezzetcook	**Peter Stoffer**	Darrell Samson
NDP	Ontario	Niagara Centre	**Malcolm Allen**	Vance Badawey
NDP	Ontario	Davenport	**Andrew Cash**	Julie Dzerowicz
NDP	Ontario	Ottawa Centre	**Paul Dewar**	Catherine McKenna
NDP	Ontario	Nickel Belt	Claude Gravelle	Marc Serré
NDP	Ontario	Scarborough Southwest	**Dan Harris**	Bill Blair
NDP	Ontario	Beaches—East York	**Matthew Kellway**	Nathaniel Erskine-Smith
NDP	Ontario	Parkdale—High Park	**Peggy Nash**	Arif Virani
NDP	Ontario	Thunder Bay—Rainy River	**John Rafferty**	Don Rusnak
NDP	Ontario	Scarborough North	**Rathika Sitsabaiesan**	Shaun Chen
NDP	Ontario	Hamilton East—Stoney Creek	**Wayne Marston**	Bob Bratina
NDP	Ontario	Toronto—Danforth	**Craig Scott**	Julie Dabrusin
NDP	Ontario	York South—Weston	**Mike Sullivan**	Ahmed Hussen
NDP	Quebec			
NDP	Quebec	Honoré-Mercier	Paulina Ayala	Pablo Rodriguez
NDP	Quebec	Louis-Hébert	Denis Blanchette	Joël Lightbound
NDP	Quebec	Pierrefonds—Dollard	**Lysane Blanchette-Lamothe**	Frank Baylis
NDP	Quebec	Gatineau	**Françoise Boivin**	Steve MacKinnon
NDP	Quebec	Terrebonne	**Charmaine Borg** ‡	Michel Boudrias
NDP	Quebec	Châteauguay—Lacolle	Sylvain Chicoine	Brenda Shanahan
NDP	Quebec	Beauport—Limoilou	Raymond Côté	Alupa Clarke
NDP	Quebec	Charlesbourg—Haute-Saint-Charles	**Anne-Marie Day**	Pierre Paul-Hus
NDP	Quebec	Rivière-du-Nord	**Pierre Dionne Labelle**	Rhéal Fortin
NDP	Quebec	Alfred-Pellan	Rosane Doré Lefebvre	Angelo Iacono
NDP	Quebec	Manicouagan	Jonathan Genest-Jourdain	Marilène Gill
NDP	Quebec	Thérèse-De Blainville	Alain Giguère	Ramez Ayoub
NDP	Quebec	Longueuil—Charles-LeMoyne	**Sadia Groguhé**	Sherry Romanado
NDP	Quebec	Montmagny—L'Islet—Kamouraska—Rivière-du-Loup	**François Lapointe**	Bernard Généreux
NDP	Quebec	LaSalle—Émard—Verdun	**Hélène LeBlanc**	David Lametti
NDP	Quebec	Rivière-des-Mille-Îles	Laurin Liu	Linda Lapointe
NDP	Quebec	Brossard—Saint-Lambert	**Hoang Mai**	Alexandra Mendès
NDP	Quebec	Portneuf—Jacques-Cartier	Élaine Michaud	Joël Godin
NDP	Quebec	Dorval—Lachine—LaSalle	Isabelle Morin	Anju Dhillon
NDP	Quebec	Chicoutimi—Le Fjord	Dany Morin	Denis Lemieux
NDP	Quebec	Vaudreuil—Soulanges	Jamie Nicholls	Peter Schiefke
NDP	Quebec	Vimy	José Núñez-Melo^{a}	Eva Nassif
NDP	Quebec	Québec	Annick Papillon	Jean-Yves Duclos
NDP	Quebec	La Pointe-de-l'Île	Ève Péclet	Mario Beaulieu
NDP	Quebec	Laval—Les Îles	François Pilon	Fayçal El-Khoury
NDP	Quebec	Pontiac	**Mathieu Ravignat**	Will Amos
NDP	Quebec	Compton—Stanstead	**Jean Rousseau**	Marie-Claude Bibeau
NDP	Quebec	Montarville	Djaouida Sellah	Michel Picard
NDP	Quebec	Gaspésie—Les Îles-de-la-Madeleine	**Philip Toone**	Diane Lebouthillier
NDP	Quebec	Beauport—Côte-de-Beaupré—Île d’Orléans—Charlevoix	Jonathan Tremblay	Sylvie Boucher
NDP	Quebec	Hull—Aylmer	**Nycole Turmel**	Greg Fergus
NDP	The North	Northwest Territories	**Dennis Bevington**	Michael McLeod
Green	Ontario	Thunder Bay—Superior North	Bruce Hyer	Patty Hajdu
Strength in Democracy	Quebec	Avignon—La Mitis— Matane—Matapédia	Jean-François Fortin	Rémi Massé
Strength in Democracy	Quebec	La Pointe-de-l'Île	Jean-François Larose‡	Mario Beaulieu
Independent	Alberta	St. Albert—Edmonton	Brent Rathgeber^{b}	Michael Cooper
Independent	Newfoundland and Labrador	Avalon	Scott Andrews^{c}	Ken McDonald
Independent	Quebec	Ahuntsic-Cartierville	Maria Mourani^{d}	Mélanie Joly
Independent	Quebec	Montcalm	Manon Perreault^{e}	Luc Thériault

- **^a** Sat as NDP at dissolution; joined and ran for the Green Party after writ was issued.
- **^b** Sat as Conservative until resigning from the party in 2013.
- **^c** Sat at Liberal until expulsion from the party in 2014.
- **^d** Ran for the New Democratic Party.
- **^e** Ran for Strength in Democracy.

== Notional gains ==
As a result of the 2012 federal electoral redistribution, thirty new ridings were added and many riding boundaries were changed, so several incumbent MPs who ran chose to do so in new ridings. The following table identifies the subsequent nominees in their old ridings and who they lost to.

Electoral District, with 2011 redistributed result		Incumbent at dissolution and subsequent nominee		New MP
Alberta	Edmonton Mill Woods	Mike Lake	Tim Uppal	Amarjeet Sohi
British Columbia	Burnaby North—Seymour	Kennedy Stewart	Carol Baird Ellan	Terry Beech
British Columbia	North Island—Powell River	John Duncan	Laura Smith	Rachel Blaney
British Columbia	Steveston—Richmond East	Kerry-Lynne Findlay	Kenny Chiu	Joe Peschisolido
Ontario	Bay of Quinte	Daryl Kramp	Jodie Jenkins	Neil Ellis
Ontario	Brampton East	Bal Gosal	Naval Bajaj	Raj Grewal
Ontario	Brampton West	Kyle Seeback	Ninder Thind	Kamal Khera
Ontario	Don Valley East	Joe Daniel	Maureen Harquail	Yasmin Ratansi
Ontario	Hamilton West—Ancaster—Dundas	David Sweet	Vincent Samuel	Filomena Tassi
Ontario	Nepean	Pierre Poilievre	Andy Wang	Chandra Arya
Ontario	Oakville North—Burlington	Lisa Raitt	Effie Triantafilopoulos	Pam Damoff
Ontario	Richmond Hill	Costas Menegakis	Michael Parsa	Majid Jowhari
Quebec	Argenteuil—La Petite-Nation	Mylène Freeman	Chantal Crête	Stéphane Lauzon
Quebec	Marc-Aurèle-Fortin	Alain Giguère	Marie-Josée Lemieux	Yves Robillard
Quebec	Repentigny	Jean-François Larose	Johnathan Cloutier	Monique Pauzé
Saskatchewan	Regina—Lewvan	Tom Lukiwski	Trent Fraser	Erin Weir
Saskatchewan	Saskatoon West	Kelly Block	Randy Donauer	Sheri Benson

== Effects of redistribution ==
As a result of the 2012 federal electoral redistribution, 31 new ridings were added and two ridings were merged. Boundary changes in eleven other ridings had the effect of revising the first-place ranking from what had occurred in 2011.

Net effect of 2012 redistribution
Effect	#
New ridings	31
Merged riding	1
No change in boundaries	44
Modified boundaries - change in 1st place	11
Modified boundaries - no change in standing	251
Total	338

=== New and merged seats ===
The following table identifies what party would have held the redistributed ridings based on 2011 results for the new ridings, and the subsequent MPs who were elected.

Party	Electoral District		New MP
Conservative			
Conservative	Alberta	Bow River	Martin Shields
Conservative	Alberta	Calgary Rocky Ridge	Pat Kelly
Conservative	Alberta	Calgary Shepard	Tom Kmiec
Conservative	Alberta	Edmonton Manning	Ziad Aboultaif
Conservative	Alberta	Edmonton—Wetaskiwin	Mike Lake
Conservative	Alberta	Peace River—Westlock	Arnold Viersen
Conservative	Alberta	Sturgeon River—Parkland	Rona Ambrose
Conservative	British Columbia	Cloverdale—Langley City	John Aldag
Conservative	British Columbia	Delta	Carla Qualtrough
Conservative	British Columbia	Mission—Matsqui—Fraser Canyon	Jati Sidhu
Conservative	British Columbia	Vancouver Granville	Jody Wilson-Raybould
Conservative	Ontario	Aurora—Oak Ridges—Richmond Hill	Leona Alleslev
Conservative	Ontario	Barrie—Springwater—Oro-Medonte	Alex Nuttall
Conservative	Ontario	Brampton Centre	Ramesh Sangha
Conservative	Ontario	Brampton South	Sonia Sidhu
Conservative	Ontario	Carleton	Pierre Poilievre
Conservative	Ontario	Don Valley North	Geng Tan
Conservative	Ontario	Flamborough—Glanbrook	David Sweet
Conservative	Ontario	Hastings—Lennox and Addington	Mike Bossio
Conservative	Ontario	King—Vaughan	Deb Schulte
Conservative	Ontario	Kitchener South—Hespeler	Marwan Tabbara
Conservative	Ontario	Milton	Lisa Raitt
Conservative	Ontario	Mississauga Centre	Omar Alghabra
NDP	Ontario		
NDP	British Columbia	Burnaby South	Kennedy Stewart
NDP	British Columbia	Nanaimo—Ladysmith	Sheila Malcolmson
NDP	Ontario	University—Rosedale	Chrystia Freeland
NDP	Quebec	La Prairie	Jean-Claude Poissant
NDP	Quebec	Mirabel	Simon Marcil
NDP	Quebec	Thérèse-De Blainville	Ramez Ayoub
Liberal	Ontario	Scarborough—Rouge Park	Gary Anandasangaree
Liberal	Ontario	Markham—Thornhill	John McCallum

In Alberta, Vegreville—Wainwright and Westlock—St. Paul were merged to form Lakeland.

Party	Electoral District		New MP
Conservative	Alberta	Lakeland	Shannon Stubbs

Seats won/lost by party (new and merged seats)
Party	2011 (redistributed)	Gain from (loss to)									2015
Party	2011 (redistributed)	Lib		Con		NDP		BQ		Grn	2015
Liberal	2			12		3					17
Conservative	24		(12)								12
New Democratic	6		(3)						(1)		2
Bloc Québécois	–					1					1
Green	–										–
Total	32	–	(15)	12	–	4	–	–	(1)	–	32

=== Reclassified seats ===
Reclassified ridings (where redistribution adjusted 1st place ranking)
Province	2011	Redist.	Riding	New MP
British Columbia	█ New Democratic	█ Conservative	Burnaby North—Seymour	Terry Beech
British Columbia	█ New Democratic	█ Conservative	Port Moody—Coquitlam	Fin Donnelly*
British Columbia	█ New Democratic	█ Conservative	South Okanagan—West Kootenay	Richard Cannings
Saskatchewan	█ Conservative	█ New Democratic	Regina—Lewvan	Erin Weir
Saskatchewan	█ Conservative	█ New Democratic	Saskatoon West	Sheri Benson
Manitoba	█ Liberal	█ New Democratic	Winnipeg North	Kevin Lamoureux*
Ontario	█ Conservative	█ New Democratic	Brampton East	Raj Grewal
Ontario	█ Conservative	█ Liberal	Don Valley East	Yasmin Ratansi
Quebec	█ Bloc Québécois	█ Liberal	Ahuntsic-Cartierville	Mélanie Joly
Quebec	█ New Democratic	█ Bloc Québécois	Gaspésie—Les Îles-de-la-Madeleine	Diane Lebouthillier
Newfoundland and Labrador	█ Liberal	█ Conservative	Avalon	Ken McDonald

* - Incumbent

Seats won/lost by party (reclassified seats)
Party	2011 (redistributed)	Gain from (loss to)									2015
Party	2011 (redistributed)	Lib		Con		NDP		BQ		Grn	2015
Liberal	2			2		2		1			7
Conservative	4		(2)				(2)				–
New Democratic	4		(2)	2							4
Bloc Québécois	1		(1)								–
Green	–										–
Total	11	–	(5)	4	–	2	(2)	1	–	–	11

=== Ridings with unchanged boundaries ===
There were 44 ridings whose boundaries were not changed as a result of the redistribution. Their election results were as follows:

Party	Electoral District		New MP
Conservative	Manitoba	Charleswood—St. James—Assiniboia—Headingley	Doug Eyolfson
Conservative	Newfoundland and Labrador	Labrador	Yvonne Jones*
Conservative	Nova Scotia	West Nova	Colin Fraser
Conservative	Ontario	Bruce—Grey—Owen Sound	Larry Miller*
Conservative	Ontario	Dufferin—Caledon	David Tilson*
Conservative	Ontario	Eglinton—Lawrence	Marco Mendicino
Conservative	Ontario	Huron—Bruce	Ben Lobb*
Conservative	Ontario	Leeds—Grenville—Thousand Islands and Rideau Lakes	Gord Brown*
Conservative	Ontario	Niagara Falls	Rob Nicholson*
Conservative	Ontario	Oakville	John Oliver
Conservative	Ontario	Parry Sound-Muskoka	Tony Clement*
Conservative	Ontario	Perth Wellington	John Nater
Conservative	Ontario	Renfrew—Nipissing—Pembroke	Cheryl Gallant*
Conservative	Ontario	Sarnia—Lambton	Marilyn Gladu
Conservative	Ontario	Stormont—Dundas—South Glengarry	Guy Lauzon*
Conservative	Ontario	Wellington—Halton Hills	Michael Chong*
Conservative	Prince Edward Island	Egmont	Bobby Morrissey
Conservative	Territories	Nunavut	Hunter Tootoo
Conservative	Territories	Yukon	Larry Bagnell
NDP	British Columbia	Vancouver East	Jenny Kwan
NDP	British Columbia	Victoria	Murray Rankin*
NDP	Manitoba	Winnipeg Centre	Robert-Falcon Ouellette
NDP	Ontario	Beaches—East York	Nathaniel Erskine-Smith
NDP	Ontario	Davenport	Julie Dzerowicz
NDP	Ontario	Parkdale—High Park	Arif Virani
NDP	Ontario	Toronto—Danforth	Julie Dabrusin
NDP	Ontario	York South—Weston	Ahmed Hussen
NDP	Quebec	Drummond	François Choquette*
NDP	Quebec	Laurentides—Labelle	David Graham
NDP	Quebec	Montmagny—L'Islet—Kamouraska—Rivière-du-Loup	Bernard Généreux
NDP	Quebec	Pierrefonds—Dollard	Frank Baylis
NDP	Quebec	Portneuf—Jacques-Cartier	Joël Godin
NDP	Quebec	Rimouski-Neigette—Témiscouata—Les Basques	Guy Caron*
NDP	Quebec	Saint-Hyacinthe—Bagot	Brigitte Sansoucy
NDP	Quebec	Saint-Jean	Saint-Jean
NDP	Territories	Northwest Territories	Michael McLeod
Liberal	Nova Scotia	Kings—Hants	Scott Brison*
Liberal	Nova Scotia	Sydney—Victoria	Mark Eyking*
Liberal	Ontario	Guelph	Lloyd Longfield
Liberal	Ontario	Humber River—Black Creek	Judy Sgro*
Liberal	Prince Edward Island	Cardigan	Lawrence MacAulay*
Liberal	Prince Edward Island	Charlottetown	Sean Casey*
Liberal	Prince Edward Island	Malpeque	Wayne Easter*
Bloc Québécois	Quebec	Bécancour—Nicolet—Saurel	Louis Plamondon*

* - Incumbent

Seats won/lost by party (ridings with unchanged boundaries)
Party	2011 (redistributed)	Gain from (loss to)									2015
Party	2011 (redistributed)	Lib		Con		NDP		BQ		Grn	2015
Liberal	7			8		10					25
Conservative	19		(8)			2					13
New Democratic	17		(10)		(2)						5
Bloc Québécois	1										1
Green	–										–
Total	44	–	(18)	8	(2)	12	–	–	–	–	44

=== Canadian Election Study ===
The 2015 CES included two survey components. Both included two waves of questions, one in the campaign period (CPS) and a recontact wave after the election (PES).

The non-probability online survey included a sample of Canadians from across the country (CPS n=11,614; PES n=6,554).

The following table is the indicated vote choice in the 2015 election, cross-tabbed with demographic questions. The weights have been adjusted to match the actual results of the election.

==== Demographics ====
Demographic Subgroup	LPC	CPC	NDP	BQC	GPC	Other	Sample
Total Vote	39.5	31.9	19.7	4.7	3.4	0.8	6,554
Gender
Men	36.6	35.7	18.8	4.8	2.9	1.2	3,083
Women	42.5	28.0	20.7	4.6	3.9	0.4	2,996
Age
18-29	45.7	22.1	23.7	2.6	4.2	1.7	762
30-39	43.9	26.9	22.1	4.1	2.9	0.0	963
40-49	39.1	33.4	18.1	4.9	4.3	0.3	929
50-59	37.2	32.7	20.1	5.7	3.1	1.2	1,225
60-69	36.4	34.2	18.8	6.3	3.1	1.2	1,300
70-79	37.0	40.0	16.2	3.6	2.7	0.5	665
80+	30.8	46.9	14.7	0.9	6.7	0.0	143
Language
English	41.5	35.5	18.1	0.2	3.9	0.7	4,868
French	31.4	17.4	26.1	22.6	1.5	1.0	1,216
Highest Education Attainment
High School or Less	38.0	32.4	19.7	5.5	3.4	1.0	2,495
College	35.9	36.0	19.8	4.2	2.9	1.2	1,299
University	43.1	29.1	19.7	4.0	3.7	0.4	2,221
Religion
Atheist	41.6	23.0	24.7	4.7	5.1	0.9	1,603
Agnostic	38.7	21.0	26.3	5.9	8.1	0.0	75
Buddhist	38.2	26.1	21.2	2.3	7.6	4.5	61
Hindu	63.8	27.5	8.7	0.0	0.0	0.0	39
Jewish	39.5	49.8	10.7	0.0	0.0	0.0	60
Muslim/Islam	76.5	9.4	13.4	0.0	0.7	0.0	84
Sikh	67.5	22.0	10.5	0.0	0.0	0.0	19
Christian	37.0	37.7	17.0	4.9	2.5	0.9	3,416
Catholic	40.4	27.9	19.6	9.6	1.8	0.7	1,606
Protestant & Other Christian	33.9	46.4	14.7	0.7	3.2	1.0	1,810
Other Religion	43.8	27.2	20.2	1.4	7.4	0.0	147
Ethnicity
White	38.4	32.4	19.8	5.1	3.5	0.8	5,462
East Asian	44.9	39.6	13.1	0.0	2.3	0.0	159
Hispanic	47.5	31.9	16.7	0.0	3.9	0.0	27
South Asian	53.1	30.5	15.3	1.0	0.0	0.0	67
Indigenous	49.0	22.2	23.2	0.5	5.0	0.0	129
Other	49.7	24.2	20.5	1.5	3.5	0.6	432
Income
0-30,000	37.1	25.2	24.9	7.1	4.6	1.1	889
30,001-60,000	38.8	29.7	21.7	5.5	3.7	0.4	1,514
60,001-90,000	38.8	32.9	19.9	4.5	2.8	1.1	1,277
90,001-110,000	43.0	32.1	18.0	4.0	2.5	0.3	614
>110,000	41.8	36.5	14.8	3.1	2.8	1.0	1,281
Home Ownership
Own	39.1	34.4	18.0	4.0	3.6	0.9	4,699
Rent	40.3	23.3	26.0	7.0	3.0	0.3	1,311
Marital Status
Married	39.4	38.4	15.2	2.9	3.2	0.9	3,042
Not Married	39.5	25.4	24.3	6.4	3.7	0.7	2,983
Employment
Working for pay	41.9	31.0	19.0	4.1	3.4	0.5	2,678
Self employed	33.2	38.5	18.3	3.5	4.1	2.4	478
Retired	36.3	35.0	18.8	5.9	3.4	0.5	1,604
Unemployed	40.9	24.4	24.2	6.3	2.5	1.7	244
Student	42.9	18.8	26.6	5.0	4.5	2.3	188
Caregiver/Homemaker	36.8	37.9	17.7	3.4	4.3	0.0	177
Disabled	42.5	26.6	24.4	3.4	3.0	0.0	219
Do you belong to a union?
Yes	42.3	24.5	24.4	5.2	2.9	0.7	1,087
No	38.6	34.3	18.5	4.4	3.6	0.5	3,992
