= Committee on the Environment, Public Health and Food Safety =

The Committee on the Environment, Public Health and Food Safety may refer to:

- European Parliament Committee on the Environment, Public Health and Food Safety
- The former name of the current Canadian House of Commons Standing Committee on Environment and Sustainable Development
