= Benoît Sauvageau =

Canadian politician

Member of Parliament for Terrebonne
- In office October 25, 1993 – June 2, 1997
- Preceded by: Jean-Marc Robitaille
- Succeeded by: last member

Member of Parliament for Repentigny
- In office June 2, 1997 – August 28, 2006
- Preceded by: first member
- Succeeded by: Raymond Gravel

Personal details
- Born: November 22, 1963 Charlemagne, Quebec, Canada
- Died: August 28, 2006 (aged 42) Repentigny, Quebec, Canada
- Party: Bloc Québécois
- Spouse: Jacinthe Amireault
- Occupation: teacher

Benoît Sauvageau (November 22, 1963 – August 28, 2006) was a Canadian politician, who served as a Bloc Québécois member of the House of Commons of Canada from 1993 until his death in 2006.

Born in Charlemagne, Quebec, he received a Bachelor of Arts degree and was a professor before entering politics. In 1993, he was elected to the House of Commons of Canada for the Quebec riding of Terrebonne. He was subsequently re-elected in the 1997, 2000, and 2004 elections in the redistricted riding of Repentigny. From 2003 to 2004, he was the Deputy Whip of the Bloc Québécois. In the federal election that fell on January 23, 2006, Sauvageau garnered over 62% of the vote in his riding for a landslide victory over the Conservatives and the Liberals, who were still reeling from their political fallout from the sponsorship scandal.

Sauvageau advocated fiscal responsibility on the Public Accounts committee and the language rights of francophones on the Official Languages committee.

== Death ==
Sauvageau died in a car accident in his riding of Repentigny on August 28, 2006, while on the way to a constituency event.

LCN initially reported that just a few minutes before the accident, his wife Jacinthe had called 9-1-1 because Sauvageau had allegedly threatened to commit suicide shortly before leaving their home. However, a coroner's report concluded in August 2007 that Sauvageau did not intentionally crash his vehicle, and confirmed that he was distracted by his cellphone.

Bloc leader Gilles Duceppe described him "as a hard working and determined MP who knew everyone in his riding". Prime Minister Stephen Harper said in a statement that: "Mr. Sauvageau was proud of his francophone roots, and was a dedicated MP who served his constituents well. He was appreciated by his colleagues for his integrity and human values and he will be missed." Long-time colleague, and then interim Liberal leader, Bill Graham stated that Sauvageau "brought to his job a great dedication and a willingness to work for the common good that made him an admired colleague for all."

== Electoral record (partial) ==
1993 Canadian federal election: Terrebonne—Blainville
Party	Candidate	Votes	%	±%	Expenditures
Bloc Québécois	Benoît Sauvageau	58,030	68.87		$59,840
Liberal	Claire Brouillet	15,102	17.92	–	$52,695
Progressive Conservative	Jean-Marc Robitaille	9,825	11.66		$69,098
New Democratic	Renée-Claude Lorimier	900	1.07		$0
Commonwealth of Canada	Christian Chouery	403	0.48		$0
Total valid votes/expense limit		84,260	100.00	–	$76,905
Total rejected ballots		3,973			
Turnout		88,233	79.12		
Electors on the lists		111,511			
Source: Thirty-fifth General Election, 1993: Official Voting Results, Published by the Chief Electoral Officer of Canada. Financial figures taken from the official contributions and expenses submitted by the candidates, provided by Elections Canada.
