= Patrick Bonin =

Canadian politician

Patrick Bonin MP
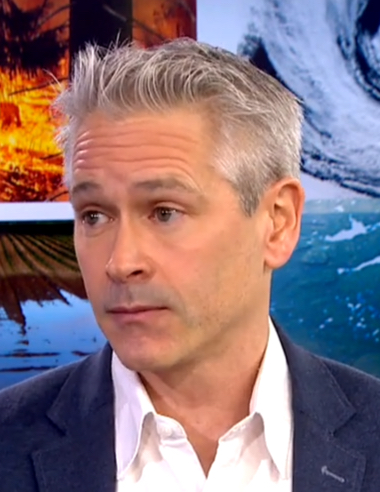
- Bonin in 2023

Member of Parliament for Repentigny
- Incumbent
- Assumed office April 28, 2025
- Preceded by: Monique Pauzé

Personal details
- Party: Bloc Québécois
- Website: patrickbonin.quebec

Patrick Bonin MP is a Canadian politician from the Bloc Québécois. He was elected Member of Parliament for Repentigny in the 2025 Canadian federal election. He is an environmental activist. He was elected vice chair of the Canadian House of Commons Standing Committee on Environment and Sustainable Development in the 45th Canadian Parliament in 2025.

At the time of the 2025 Canadian federal election, he lived in Rosemère, Quebec.

== Electoral record ==
2025 Canadian federal election: Repentigny
Party	Candidate	Votes	%	±%	Expenditures
Bloc Québécois	Patrick Bonin	26,593	42.20	−9.17	
Liberal	Pierre Richard Thomas	24,419	38.75	+10.61	
Conservative	Charles Champagne	9,583	15.21	+6.37	
New Democratic	Nathalie Gagnon	1,722	2.73	−4.73	
People's	Benoit Lanoue	384	0.61	N/A	
Independent	Ednal Marc	314	0.50		
Total valid votes/expense limit		63,015	98.24		
Total rejected ballots		1,129	1.76		
Turnout		64,144	71.49		
Eligible voters		89,719			
Bloc Québécois notional hold		Swing		−9.89	
Source: Elections Canada
Note: number of eligible voters does not include voting day registrations.
