= Monique Pauzé =

Canadian politician (born 1950)

Member of Parliament for Repentigny
- In office October 19, 2015 – March 23, 2025
- Preceded by: Jean-François Larose
- Succeeded by: Patrick Bonin

Personal details
- Born: 1950 (age 75–76) Montreal, Quebec, Canada
- Party: Bloc Québécois
- Other political affiliations: Québec debout (2018)

Monique Pauzé is a Canadian politician who was elected to the House of Commons in the 2015 election from the electoral district of Repentigny. Initially elected as a member of the Bloc Québécois, she, along with six other Bloc MPs, resigned from the Bloc's caucus to sit as an independent MP on February 28, 2018 citing conflicts with the leadership style of Martine Ouellet. She rejoined the Bloc Québécois caucus on September 17, 2018. She did not seek re-election in 2025.

== Political career ==
From 2021 to 2025 she served as the critic of environment and sustainable development in the Bloc Québécois Shadow Cabinet.

== Electoral record ==
2021 Canadian federal election: Repentigny
Party	Candidate	Votes	%	±%	Expenditures
Bloc Québécois	Monique Pauzé	30,858	51.70	-1.53	$26,104.21
Liberal	Yvelie Kernizan	16,471	27.59	-0.08	$83,019.73
Conservative	Pascal Bapfou Vozang Siewe	5,332	8.93	+1.48	$5,834.62
New Democratic	Naomie Mathieu Chauvette	4,489	7.52	+0.69	$0.00
Free	Pierre Duval	2,026	3.39	–	$1,674.32
Indépendance du Québec	Micheline Boucher Granger	516	0.86	+0.33	$0.00
Total valid votes/expense limit		59,692	–	–	$121,018.96
Total rejected ballots					
Turnout			64.30	-7.75	
Eligible voters		92,838			
Bloc Québécois hold		Swing		-0.73	
Source: Elections Canada

2019 Canadian federal election: Repentigny
Party	Candidate	Votes	%	±%	Expenditures
Bloc Québécois	Monique Pauzé	34,837	53.22	+18.54	$30,732.10
Liberal	Josée Larose	18,111	27.67	+0.38	$49.196.96
Conservative	Pierre Branchaud	4,878	7.45	-3.37	$15,427.48
New Democratic	Meryem Benslimane	4,470	6.83	-16.43	$0.33
Green	Diane Beauregard	2,289	3.50	+1.60	$0.00
People's	Samuel Saint-Laurent	524	0.80	-	none listed
Indépendance du Québec	Micheline Boucher Granger	347	0.53	-	none listed
Total valid votes/expense limit		65,456	98.03		
Total rejected ballots		1,316	1.97		
Turnout		66,772	72.04	-0.17	
Eligible voters		92,684			
Bloc Québécois hold		Swing		+9.08	
Source: Elections Canada

2015 Canadian federal election
Party	Candidate	Votes	%	±%	Expenditures
Bloc Québécois	Monique Pauzé	22,618	34.7	+3.87	–
Liberal	Adriana Dudas	17,798	27.3	+19.38	–
New Democratic	Réjean Bellemare	15,176	23.3	-28.77	–
Conservative	Jonathan Lefebvre	7,053	10.8	+3.35	–
Strength in Democracy	Johnathan Cloutier	1,333	2.0	–	
Green	Yoland Gilbert	1,242	1.9	+0.17	–
Total valid votes/Expense limit		65,211	100.0		$233,927.60
Total rejected ballots		1,179	–	–	
Turnout		66,390	72.21	–	
Eligible voters		91,986			
Bloc Québécois gain from New Democratic		Swing		+16.32	
Source: Elections Canada
