= Raymond Gravel =

Canadian Québécois Roman Catholic priest and politician

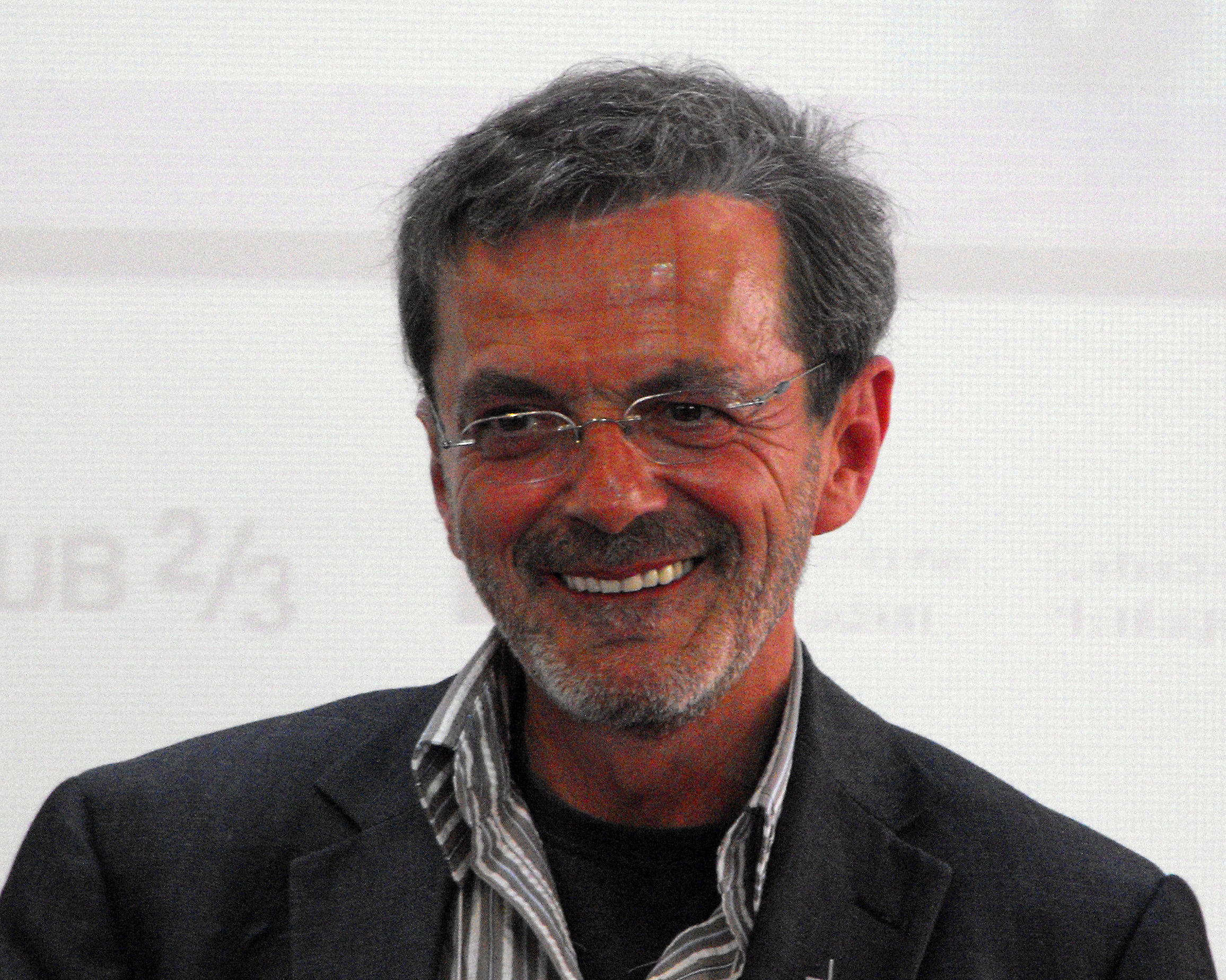

Member of Parliament for Repentigny
- In office November 27, 2006 – October 14, 2008
- Preceded by: Benoît Sauvageau
- Succeeded by: Nicolas Dufour

Personal details
- Born: November 4, 1952 Saint-Damien-de-Brandon, Quebec, Canada
- Died: August 11, 2014 (aged 61) Joliette, Quebec, Canada
- Party: Bloc Québécois
- Profession: Priest

Ecclesiastical career
- Religion: Christianity
- Church: Roman Catholic Church
- Ordained: 1982
- Congregations served: St-Joachim de la Plaine Church, La Plaine, Quebec

Raymond Gravel (November 4, 1952 – August 11, 2014) was a Canadian Catholic priest and politician from the province of Quebec. Gravel was formerly the Member of Parliament for the riding of Repentigny, as a member of the Bloc Québécois. He was elected to the House of Commons in a November 27, 2006 by-election following the death of Benoît Sauvageau.

As a young man Gravel worked in bars in Montreal's Gay Village; he was open about the fact that he was a sex-trade worker during that time. Although Gravel never came out publicly as homosexual during his lifetime, he acknowledged his homosexuality to his biographer, Claude Gravel, prior to his death.

He entered the seminary in 1982 and became a priest. Gravel was controversial among the Catholic clergy and laity for his support of abortion rights, euthanasia and same-sex marriage, three issues officially opposed by the Church. He was most recently a priest at St-Joachim de la Plaine Church in La Plaine, Quebec.

He was acclaimed as the Bloc's candidate on October 29, 2006. He received a dispensation from Gilles Lussier, Bishop of Joliette, to enter politics. Elected with a large majority in the Bloc stronghold, he became the Bloc critic for seniors' issues.

However, following his opposition to Bill C-484, which would have recognized injury of a fetus during a crime as a separate offence from an injury to the mother, and his support for Dr. Henry Morgentaler receiving the Order of Canada, Gravel was ordered by the Vatican to either give up the priesthood or leave politics, and he finally announced he would not run in the 2008 election, saying that the priesthood was his life. He cited as his biggest regret his inability to pass his private member's bill C-490, which aimed to improve seniors' access to guaranteed income supplements.

He was removed from a position as a catechist in the Quebec Diocese of Joliette during 2010. Gravel then launched a lawsuit against the LifeSiteNews (LSN) agency, a project of the Campaign Life Coalition, for $500,000 in damages. In his motion, Gravel suggested that articles on the LSN website caused him to lose this responsibility. Gravel stated that LSN misrepresented him by identifying him as 'pro-abortion' while he identified himself as 'pro-choice'. In an interview with Radio-Canada, he stated: "I am pro-choice and there is not a bishop on Earth that will prevent me from receiving communion, not even the Pope." However, he later stated, "I am against abortion, but I am not in favour of the pro-life campaign that condemns all women who get an abortion."

In 2014, he died of lung cancer. He was 61.

== Electoral record ==
Canadian federal by-election, November 27, 2006: Repentigny
Party	Candidate	Votes	%	Expenditures
Bloc Québécois	Raymond Gravel	20,635	66.26	$84,032
Conservative	Stéphane Bourgon	5,822	18.69	$46,980
New Democratic	Réjean Bellemare	2,187	7.02	$34,699
Liberal	Christian Turenne	1,940	6.23	$15,043
Independent	Jocelyne Leduc	390	1.25	$45
Canadian Action	Mahmood Raza Baig	91	0.29	$5,641
Independent	Régent Millette	78	0.25	none listed
Total valid votes		31,143	100.00	
Total rejected ballots		493		
Turnout		31,636	37.06	
Electors on the lists		85,366		
