= Nicolas Dufour =

Canadian politician

His Worship Nicolas Dufour MP

Mayor of Repentigny
- Incumbent
- Assumed office November 15, 2021
- Preceded by: Chantal Deschamps

Member of Parliament for Repentigny
- In office 2008–2011
- Preceded by: Raymond Gravel
- Succeeded by: Jean-François Larose

Personal details
- Born: June 1, 1987 (age 39) Montreal, Quebec
- Party: Bloc Québécois; Avenir Repentigny

Nicolas Dufour (born June 1, 1987) is a Canadian politician, who has been mayor of Repentigny, Quebec since the 2021 mayoral election. Previously, he represented the electoral district of Repentigny from the 2008 Canadian federal election until his defeat in 2011. He was a member of the Bloc Québécois.

Dufour was born in Montreal, Quebec. Elected at age 21, Dufour was the youngest member of the Canadian Parliament until his defeat in 2011.

== See also ==
- Baby of the House
