= Canadian House of Commons Standing Committee on Environment and Sustainable Development =

Standing committee of the House of Commons of Canada

The Canadian House of Commons Standing Committee on Environment and Sustainable Development (ENVI) is a standing committee in the House of Commons of Canada.

== Mandate ==
- Reviewing policies, programs and legislation involving:
  - Environment and Climate Change Canada
  - Parks Canada
  - Impact Assessment Act
  - Impact Assessment Agency of Canada
  - Species at Risk Act
  - Migratory Birds Convention Act
  - Canada Water Act
  - Canada Wildlife Act
  - the pollution prevention provisions of the Fisheries Act
- Studying the reports of the Commissioner of the Environment and Sustainable Development

== Membership ==
As of the 45th Canadian Parliament:

Party	Member	District
Liberal	Angelo Iacono, chair	Alfred-Pellan, QC
Conservative	Ellis Ross, vice chair	Skeena—Bulkley Valley, BC
Bloc Québécois	Patrick Bonin, vice chair	Repentigny, QC
Conservative	Carol Anstey	Long Range Mountains, NL
Conservative	David Bexte	Bow River, AB
Liberal	Bruce Fanjoy	Carleton, ON
Liberal	Wade Grant	Vancouver Quadra, BC
Conservative	Branden Leslie	Portage—Lisgar, MB
Liberal	Shannon Miedema	Halifax, NS
Liberal	Éric St-Pierre	Honoré-Mercier, QC

== Subcommittees ==
- Subcommittee on Agenda and Procedure (SENV)
