= Jean-François Larose =

Canadian politician (born 1972)

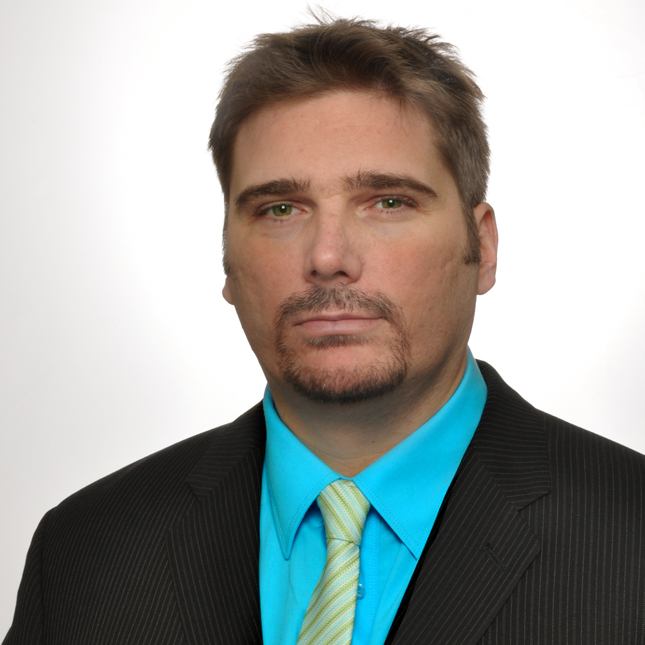
- Jean-François Larose in 2011

Member of Parliament for Repentigny
- In office May 2, 2011 – August 4, 2015
- Preceded by: Nicolas Dufour
- Succeeded by: Monique Pauzé

Personal details
- Born: April 15, 1972 (age 54) Repentigny, Quebec
- Party: New Democratic Party (2011–2014); Strength in Democracy (2014–2016)

Jean-François Larose (born April 15, 1972) is a former Canadian politician who was elected to the House of Commons of Canada in the 2011 election. He represented the electoral district of Repentigny, initially as a member of the NDP, then as a member of Strength in Democracy.

Prior to being elected, Larose was a peace officer and a security guard. Larose has certificates from Université de Montréal in the areas of crisis management, violence and society, and police and security management. Larose ran in the 2009 Montreal municipal election, seeking the position of mayor of Le Plateau-Mont-Royal borough for the Parti Montréal Ville-Marie; he garnered 2.08% of the vote.

In the 2011–12 NDP leadership race, Larose supported Niki Ashton, serving as her campaign chair.

Larose campaigned as a member of the NDP in the 2011 election, handily winning the riding of Repentigny. On October 21, 2014, Larose and Jean-François Fortin, the independent (formerly Bloc Québécois) MP for Haute-Gaspésie—La Mitis—Matane—Matapédia, announced that they were forming Strength in Democracy, a new Quebec-focused political party dedicated to representing the province's regions.

In the 2015 election, Larose contested in La Pointe-de-l'Île and lost to Mario Beaulieu. He came in seventh, receiving 135 votes and winning only 0.24% of the vote.

== Electoral record ==
2015 Canadian federal election: La Pointe-de-l'Île
Party	Candidate	Votes	%	±%	Expenditures
Bloc Québécois	Mario Beaulieu	18,545	33.58	+1.21	–
Liberal	Marie-Chantale Simard	15,777	28.57	+18.47	–
New Democratic	Ève Péclet	14,777	26.76	-20.77	–
Conservative	Guy Morissette	4,408	7.98	+0.33	–
Green	David J. Cox	1,130	2.05	+0.16	–
Rhinoceros	Ben 97 Benoit	358	0.65	–	–
Strength in Democracy	Jean-François Larose	135	0.24	–	–
Marxist–Leninist	Geneviève Royer	96	0.17	–	–
Total valid votes/Expense limit		55,226	100.00		$222,398.73
Total rejected ballots		912	1.62	–	
Turnout		56,138	65.43	–	
Eligible voters		84,507			
Bloc Québécois gain from New Democratic		Swing		+10.99	
Source: Elections Canada

2011 Canadian federal election: Repentigny
Party	Candidate	Votes	%	±%	Expenditures
New Democratic	Jean-François Larose	32,131	51.92	+36.77	
Bloc Québécois	Nicolas Dufour	19,242	31.09	-21.97	
Liberal	Chantal Perreault	4,830	7.81	-7.17	
Conservative	Christophe Royer	4,606	7.44	-6.54	
Green	Michel Duchaine	1,078	1.74	-1.11	
Total valid votes/Expense limit		61,887	100.00		
Total rejected ballots		934	1.49	–	
Turnout		62,821	66.91	–	
Eligible voters		93,882	–	–	
