= Repentigny (federal electoral district) =

Federal electoral district in Quebec, Canada

Coordinates: 45°48′N 73°26′W

Quebec electoral district
- Interactive map of riding boundaries from the 2025 federal election

Federal electoral district
- Legislature: House of Commons
MP
Patrick Bonin
Bloc Québécois
- District created: 1996
- First contested: 1997
- Last contested: 2021
- District webpage: profile, map

Demographics
- Population (2011): 111,191
- Electors (2015): 91,542
- Area (km²): 198
- Pop. density (per km²): 561.6
- Census division: L'Assomption
- Census subdivision(s): Repentigny, L'Assomption (part), Charlemagne

Repentigny (French pronunciation: [ʁəpɑ̃tiɲi]) is a federal electoral district in Quebec, Canada, that has been represented in the House of Commons of Canada since 1997. It consists of the Regional County Municipality of L'Assomption, except the city and parish of L'Épiphanie.

== Demographics ==
According to the 2021 Canadian census

Ethnic groups: 83.9% White, 8.4% Black, 3.1% Arab, 2.0% Latin American, 1.2% Indigenous
Languages: 87.9% French, 1.9% Spanish, 1.6% Arabic, 1.5% English, 1.4% Haitian Creole
Religions: 69.6% Christian (59.2% Catholic, 10.4% other), 4.7% Muslim, 25.2% none

Median income: $44,800 (2020)

Average income: $52,400 (2020)

== Political geography ==
Repentigny had long been one of the most separatist ridings in Quebec. In the 2006 election, every single poll was won by the Bloc Québécois. However, the riding was caught up in the New Democratic Party tsunami that swept through the province five years later.

== History ==
It was created in 1996 from parts of Joliette and Terrebonne ridings. It consisted initially of the cities of Charlemagne, Lachenaie, Mascouche and Repentigny; and the Parish Municipality of La Plaine in the County Regional Municipality of Les Moulins. This riding lost territory to Montcalm during the 2012 electoral redistribution.

Following the 2022 Canadian federal electoral redistribution, the riding lost the Domaine-Ouellet area to Joliette—Manawan, and lost Saint-Sulpice to Berthier—Maskinongé.

=== Members of Parliament ===
Parliament	Years	Member	Party
Repentigny; Riding created from Joliette and Terrebonne
36th	1997–2000	Benoît Sauvageau	Bloc Québécois
37th	2000–2004	Benoît Sauvageau	Bloc Québécois
38th	2004–2006	Benoît Sauvageau	Bloc Québécois
39th	2006–2006	Benoît Sauvageau	Bloc Québécois
39th	2006–2008	Raymond Gravel	Bloc Québécois
40th	2008–2011	Nicolas Dufour	Bloc Québécois
41st	2011–2014	Jean-François Larose	New Democratic
41st	2014–2015	Jean-François Larose	Strength in Democracy
42nd	2015–2018	Monique Pauzé	Bloc Québécois
42nd	2018–2018	Monique Pauzé	Groupe parlementaire québécois
42nd	2018–2019	Monique Pauzé	Bloc Québécois
43rd	2019–2021	Monique Pauzé	Bloc Québécois
44th	2021–2025	Monique Pauzé	Bloc Québécois
45th	2025–present	Patrick Bonin	Bloc Québécois

== Electoral history ==
Graph of election results in Repentigny (minor parties that never got 2% of the vote or didn't run consistently are omitted)

=== 2025 federal election ===
2025 Canadian federal election
Party	Candidate	Votes	%	±%	Expenditures
Bloc Québécois	Patrick Bonin	26,593	42.20	−9.17	
Liberal	Pierre Richard Thomas	24,419	38.75	+10.61	
Conservative	Charles Champagne	9,583	15.21	+6.37	
New Democratic	Nathalie Gagnon	1,722	2.73	−4.73	
People's	Benoit Lanoue	384	0.61	N/A	
Independent	Ednal Marc	314	0.50		
Total valid votes/expense limit		63,015	98.24		
Total rejected ballots		1,129	1.76		
Turnout		64,144	71.49		
Eligible voters		89,719			
Bloc Québécois notional hold		Swing		−9.89	
Source: Elections Canada
Note: number of eligible voters does not include voting day registrations.

2021 federal election redistributed results
Party	Vote	%
Bloc Québécois	28,822	51.37
Liberal	15,788	28.14
Conservative	4,961	8.84
New Democratic	4,187	7.46
Others	2,354	4.20

=== 2021 federal election ===
2021 Canadian federal election
Party	Candidate	Votes	%	±%	Expenditures
Bloc Québécois	Monique Pauzé	30,858	51.70	-1.53	$26,104.21
Liberal	Yvelie Kernizan	16,471	27.59	-0.08	$83,019.73
Conservative	Pascal Bapfou Vozang Siewe	5,332	8.93	+1.48	$5,834.62
New Democratic	Naomie Mathieu Chauvette	4,489	7.52	+0.69	$0.00
Free	Pierre Duval	2,026	3.39	–	$1,674.32
Indépendance du Québec	Micheline Boucher Granger	516	0.86	+0.33	$0.00
Total valid votes/expense limit		59,692	–	–	$121,018.96
Total rejected ballots					
Turnout			64.30	-7.75	
Eligible voters		92,838			
Bloc Québécois hold		Swing		-0.73	
Source: Elections Canada

=== 2019 federal election ===
2019 Canadian federal election
Party	Candidate	Votes	%	±%	Expenditures
Bloc Québécois	Monique Pauzé	34,837	53.22	+18.54	$30,732.10
Liberal	Josée Larose	18,111	27.67	+0.38	$49.196.96
Conservative	Pierre Branchaud	4,878	7.45	-3.37	$15,427.48
New Democratic	Meryem Benslimane	4,470	6.83	-16.43	$0.33
Green	Diane Beauregard	2,289	3.50	+1.60	$0.00
People's	Samuel Saint-Laurent	524	0.80	-	none listed
Indépendance du Québec	Micheline Boucher Granger	347	0.53	-	none listed
Total valid votes/expense limit		65,456	98.03		
Total rejected ballots		1,316	1.97		
Turnout		66,772	72.04	-0.17	
Eligible voters		92,684			
Bloc Québécois hold		Swing		+9.08	
Source: Elections Canada

=== 2015 federal election ===
2015 Canadian federal election
Party	Candidate	Votes	%	±%	Expenditures
Bloc Québécois	Monique Pauzé	22,618	34.68	+3.85	$34,690.68
Liberal	Adriana Dudas	17,798	27.29	+19.37	$14,244.15
New Democratic	Réjean Bellemare	15,167	23.26	-28.81	$54,858.57
Conservative	Jonathan Lefebvre	7,053	10.82	+3.37	$1,747.31
Strength in Democracy	Johnathan Cloutier	1,333	2.04	–	
Green	Yoland Gilbert	1,242	1.9	+0.17	–
Total valid votes/expense limit		65,211	100.0		$234,508.21
Total rejected ballots		1,179	–	–	
Turnout		66,390	72.21	–	
Eligible voters		91,986			
Bloc Québécois gain from Strength in Democracy		Swing		+16.32	
Source: Elections Canada

2011 federal election redistributed results
Party	Vote	%
New Democratic	30,339	52.07
Bloc Québécois	17,963	30.83
Liberal	4,613	7.92
Conservative	4,342	7.45
Green	1,006	1.73

=== 2011 federal election ===
2011 Canadian federal election
Party	Candidate	Votes	%	±%	Expenditures
New Democratic	Jean-François Larose	32,131	51.92	+36.77	
Bloc Québécois	Nicolas Dufour	19,242	31.09	-21.97	
Liberal	Chantal Perreault	4,830	7.81	-7.17	
Conservative	Christophe Royer	4,606	7.44	-6.54	
Green	Michel Duchaine	1,078	1.74	-1.11	
Total valid votes/expense limit		61,887	100.00		
Total rejected ballots		934	1.49	–	
Turnout		62,821	66.91	–	
Eligible voters		93,882	–	–	

=== 2008 federal election ===
Fr. Gravel chose not to run again, citing pressure from the Church. Party activist Nicolas Dufour secured the Bloc nomination, becoming one of their youngest candidates. Réjean Bellemare ran again for the NDP. The Bloc held the riding handily, with the NDP securing one of the party's four second-place finishes in the province.

2008 Canadian federal election
Party	Candidate	Votes	%	±%	Expenditures	
Bloc Québécois	Nicolas Dufour	31,005	53.06	-13.20	$90,525	
New Democratic	Réjean Bellemare	8,853	15.15	+8.13	$5,448	
Liberal	Robert Semegen	8,746	14.97	+8.74	$7,684	
Conservative	Bruno Royer	8,168	13.98	-4.72	$46,962	
Green	Paul W. Fournier	1,666	2.85	–	–	$4,967
Total valid votes/expense limit		58,438	100.00	$91,738		
Turnout		–	53.3			
Bloc Québécois hold		Swing		-10.7		

=== 2006 by-election ===
MP Benoît Sauvageau was killed in a car accident on August 28, 2006. Prime Minister Stephen Harper called for a by-election on October 22, 2006, with a polling day of November 27, 2006.

There had been a lot of pressure from opposition parties for Public Works Minister Michael Fortier, a Conservative senator, to run in the riding; however, he declined. Fortier was appointed to the Senate and the Cabinet to represent Greater Montreal which elected no Conservatives in the last federal election, while Fortier pledged to resign from the Senate and seek election to the House of Commons in the next federal election. Instead, the Conservative candidate was Stéphane Bourgon, a lawyer. The Bloc Québécois, of which Sauvageau was a member, ran Raymond Gravel, a Roman Catholic priest. The New Democratic Party candidate was union activist and former Canadian Navy member Réjean Bellemare, who had also run for the NDP in the previous general election.

The Green Party of Canada had announced that Marc-André Gadoury would be their candidate, but he did not complete and submit paperwork to Elections Canada in sufficient time to get on the ballot. Gadoury suggested that the Greens did not submit the paperwork on purpose and on November 25, 2006, La Presse reported that Gadoury was endorsing the NDP candidate, Réjean Bellemare.

Raymond Gravel of the Bloc Québécois won the by-election with an approximately two-thirds majority of votes.

Canadian federal by-election, 27 November 2006 Death of Benoît Sauvageau
Party	Candidate	Votes	%	±%	Expenditures
Bloc Québécois	Raymond Gravel	20,635	66.26	+3.84	$84,032
Conservative	Stéphane Bourgon	5,822	18.69	+0.61	$46,980
New Democratic	Réjean Bellemare	2,187	7.02	-0.72	$34,699
Liberal	Christian Turenne	1,940	6.23	-2.42	$15,043
Independent	Jocelyne Leduc	390	1.25	n/a	$45
Canadian Action	Mahmood Raza Baig	91	0.29	n/a	$5,641
Independent	Régent Millette	78	0.25	n/a	
Total valid votes/expense limit		31,143	100.00	$85,285	
Called because of the death of M. Sauvageau on 28 August 2006

=== 1997-2006 ===
2006 Canadian federal election
Party	Candidate	Votes	%	±%	Expenditures
Bloc Québécois	Benoît Sauvageau	34,958	62.42	-7.64	$66,386
Conservative	Claude Lafortune, Jr.	10,124	18.08	+13.31	$4,967
Liberal	Josyanne Forest	4,847	8.65	-9.6	$8,129
New Democratic	Réjean Bellemare	4,337	7.74	+4.76	$7,511
Green	Adam Jastrzebski	1,742	3.11	+0.22	$0
Total valid votes/expense limit		56,008	100.00	$82,825	

2004 Canadian federal election
Party	Candidate	Votes	%	±%	Expenditures
Bloc Québécois	Benoît Sauvageau	35,907	70.06	+12.26	
Liberal	Lévis Brien	9,353	18.25	-8.63	$76,485
Conservative	Allen F. Mackenzie	2,447	4.77	-5.69	$5,725
New Democratic	André Cardinal	1,526	2.98	+1.55	
Green	Jean-François Lévêque	1,482	2.89	n/a	$0
Marijuana	François Boudreau	539	1.05	-2.38	
Total valid votes/expense limit		51,254	100.00	$79,823	

2000 Canadian federal election
Party	Candidate	Votes	%	±%
Bloc Québécois	Benoît Sauvageau	33,627	57.80	+1.51
Liberal	David Veillette	15,635	26.88	+5.74
Progressive Conservative	Michel Carignan	3,122	5.37	-15.67
Alliance	Michel Paulette	2,964	5.09	n/a
Marijuana	Lise Dufour	1,997	3.43	n/a
New Democratic	Pierre Péclet	831	1.43	-0.12
Total		58,176	95.84	
Total rejected ballots		2,525	4.16	-1.16
Turnout		60,701	63.54	-10.21
Electors on the lists		95,534		
Bloc Québécois hold		Swing		-2.11

1997 Canadian federal election
Party	Candidate	Votes	%	±%
Bloc Québécois	Benoît Sauvageau	33,283	56.29	-13.19
Liberal	Robert Tranchemontagne	12,495	21.13	+3.38
Progressive Conservative	Michel Carignan	12,436	21.03	+9.73
New Democratic	Normand Caplette	916	1.55	+0.53
Total		59,130	94.68	
Total rejected ballots		3,323	5.32	
Turnout		62,453	73.75	
Electors on the lists		84,686		
Bloc Québécois hold		Swing		-8.29

1993 federal election redistributed results
Party	Vote	%
Bloc Québécois	41,385	69.48
Liberal	10,574	17.75
Progressive Conservative	6,729	11.30
New Democratic	608	1.02
Commonwealth	266	0.45

== See also ==
- List of Canadian electoral districts
- Historical federal electoral districts of Canada
