= Strength in Democracy =

Strength in Democracy Forces et Démocratie
- Founded: October 21, 2014
- Dissolved: September 9, 2016
- Split from: Bloc Québécois and New Democratic Party
- Headquarters: Matane, Quebec
- Ideology: Social democracy Regionalism; Quebec nationalism Participatory democracy
- Political position: Centre-left
- Colours: Green, White, Blue

Website
- forcesetdemocratie.org

Strength in Democracy (French: Forces et Démocratie, French pronunciation: [fɔʁs e demɔkʁasi]) was a Canadian federal political party founded in 2014 by two Quebec Members of Parliament (MPs). From October 2014 to October 2015, the party was represented in the House of Commons of Canada by its two founding members, Jean-François Fortin and Jean-François Larose. The party was led from its inception by Fortin.

The party failed to win a seat in the 2015 federal election, and both its sitting MPs were defeated. Fortin announced his resignation as leader on January 3, 2016. The party was deregistered by Elections Canada on September 9, 2016.

== History ==
The Strength in Democracy party was formed on October 21, 2014, by Jean-François Fortin, a member of the Bloc Québécois, and Repentigny MP Jean-François Larose, a member of the New Democratic Party. The two MPs stated that the four major federal parties in Quebec (the Conservatives, New Democratic Party (NDP), Liberals, and Bloc Québécois) were focused on power and politics over representing their constituents.

Fortin, who had run for the leadership of the Bloc Québécois (BQ) in 2011, had left the BQ in August 2014 to sit as an independent MP citing disapproval of new BQ leader Mario Beaulieu.

The party announced that it would run candidates outside of Quebec in the 2015 federal election under the name "Strength in Democracy", and its first candidate, Toban Leckie, was announced in Peterborough—Kawartha. Jennifer McCreath, who ran for the party in Avalon, was the first transgender candidate in a federal election.

Independent MP Manon Perreault, who had been expelled from the New Democratic Party after being convicted for mischief, was announced as the Strength in Democracy candidate in Montcalm on August 12, 2015, where she sought re-election.

== Electoral performance ==
Election	Leader	Candidates	Votes	% of votes	% where running	Seats	+/–	Position	Government
2015	Jean-François Fortin	17	8,274	0.047	0.897	0 / 338	▼3	9th	Extra-parliamentary
