= François-Xavier Bélanger =

Canadian scientist (1833–1882)

- Born: 1833; Saint-Vallier, Lower Canada
- Died: January 19, 1882 (aged 48–49); Quebec City
- Known for: Museum curator, Microlepidoptera studies
- Scientific career
- Fields: Natural history, entomology
- Workplaces: Université Laval

François-Xavier Bélanger (1833 – 19 January 1882) was a French-Canadian naturalist and museum curator. An autodidact like many naturalists of the time, he specialized in the study of Microlepidoptera. Thanks to the influence of Léon Abel Provancher and Thomas-Étienne Hamel, he became curator of the zoology museum at Université Laval, where although he did a good job of enlarging the total collection, he did so in a generally poorly organized way. He was succeeded by his assistant curator Charles-Eusèbe Dionne.

== Biography ==
Bélanger was born in 1833 in Saint-Vallier, a small rural village on the southern shore of the Saint Lawrence River, and married Vitaline Fontaine. From 1846 to 1853 he studied at the Petit Séminaire de Québec and then taught in rural schools for a few years before returning to Quebec City where he worked at the Courrier du Canada, mainly as a proofreader. Léon Provancher noticed his published papers on insects and invited him in 1868 to write for his newly created Naturaliste Canadien. Bélanger was a good illustrator, and a relatively competent naturalist, although his major interest was entomology.

In 1869, thanks to Provancher and Thomas-Étienne Hamel, the then-Dean of the faculty of arts and General Secretary, he was appointed as curator of the zoology museum of Université Laval. From then until his death in 1882 he was charged with maintaining and enlarging the collection, though this was mostly restricted to the entomological collection after 1874, possibly because of limited space for larger specimens. During his tenure he published relatively little, all his energy being taken by the management and preparation of items for the collection. He did, however, provide specimens to other naturalists, often of new species. V.T. Chambers named two species after him in 1875, Gelechia belangerella, now Pseudotelphusa belangerella, and Argyresthia belangerella. In the 1870s, Bélanger increased communication and exchange with European specialists, and was given the task of organizing the university's exhibit for the Centennial Exposition, where he was accompanied by Hamel.

The main collection upon Bélanger's arrival was one given by William Couper: less than fifty mammals, reptiles and fishes, some two hundred birds and three thousand insects, as well as an exotic birds collection, mostly acquired from the American Smithsonian Institution, and a large conchological collection. Amongst Bélanger's accomplishments was the acquisition of a large collection from French naturalist Alfred Lechevallier and another, of birds, from the commissioner of crown lands Pierre-Étienne Fortin. In the 1870s, the collection counted 1,300 Canadian birds in addition to existing exotic ones, a hundred mammals, about as many reptiles and fishes, and over thirty thousand insects.

While Bélanger invested all his time and energy in the museum and succeeded in greatly enlarging the collections, his limited competence in non-entomological taxonomy and average skills in taxidermy meant the collection was generally poorly organized, and sometimes outright outdated. His timidity also kept him from doing justice to the collection. These problems where highlighted later by illness and the arrival of Charles-Eusèbe Dionne as assistant curator- who overshadowed Bélanger in almost all areas. The question of replacing Bélanger was sensitive, though, because he was strongly backed by Provancher- a very influential figure. His death in 1882 solved the problem definitively, and the academic authorities quickly nominate Dionne to replace him.
