= Donald Thomas =

Donald Thomas or Don Thomas may refer to:

- Donald A. Thomas (born 1955), American engineer and former NASA astronaut
- D. M. Thomas (Donald Michael Thomas, 1935–2023), Cornish novelist, poet, and translator
- Donald Serrell Thomas (1934–2022), British writer of (primarily) Victorian-era historical, crime and detective fiction
- Donald Thomas (high jumper) (born 1984), Bahamian high jumper
- Donald Thomas (American football) (born 1985), American football guard
- Donald Thomas (racing driver) (1932–1977), stock car racing driver
- Donnie Thomas (American football) (1953–2017), American football linebacker
- Donald W. Thomas (1953–2009), university administrator and ecologist
- E. Donnall Thomas (1920–2012), American physician, developer of bone marrow transplant
- Donnie Thomas (US Army), former commander of Guantanamo's Joint Detention Group
- Don Thomas, alias of comic character of Blue Streak

== See also ==
- Don Tomas (disambiguation)
