= Charles Dionne =

Charles Dionne may refer to:

- Charles-Eugène Dionne (1908–1984), Canadian member of the House of Commons
- Charles-Eusèbe Dionne (1846–1925), Canadian naturalist and taxidermist
- Charles Dionne (cyclist) (born 1979), Canadian road cyclist
