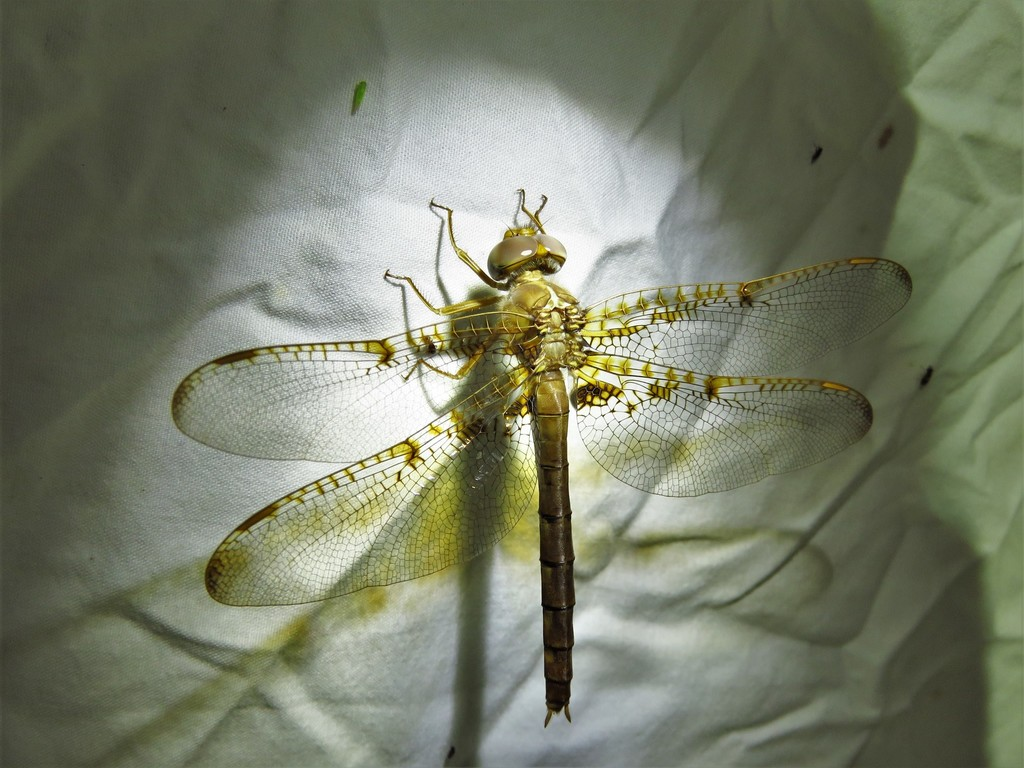
- Neurocordulia xanthosoma

Scientific classification
- Kingdom: Animalia
- Phylum: Arthropoda
- Clade: Pancrustacea
- Class: Insecta
- Order: Odonata
- Infraorder: Anisoptera
- Family: Corduliidae
- Subfamily: Corduliinae
- Genus: Neurocordulia; Selys, 1871

= Neurocordulia =

Shadowdragons

Genus of dragonflies

Neurocordulia is a genus of dragonfly in the family Corduliidae. They are commonly known as shadowdragons.

These are medium-sized dragonflies, 40–55 mm (1.6–2.2 in) long, light brown with orange or yellowish markings. They are confined to the eastern United States and Canada, where their habitat is clean forest streams and lakes.

== Species ==
The genus contains the following species:

Image	Scientific name	Common name	Distribution
	Neurocordulia alabamensis Hodges in Needham & Westfall, 1955	Alabama shadowdragon	Alabama
	Neurocordulia michaeli Brunelle, 2000	broad-tailed shadowdragon	Canada and the United States.
	Neurocordulia molesta (Walsh, 1863)	smoky shadowdragon	North America
	Neurocordulia obsoleta (Say, 1839)	umber shadowdragon	North America
	Neurocordulia virginiensis Davis, 1927	cinnamon shadowdragon	North America
	Neurocordulia xanthosoma (Williamson, 1908)	orange shadowdragon	North America
	Neurocordulia yamaskanensis (Provancher, 1875)	stygian shadowdragon	mid-Atlantic US states and extends northward into southern Canada
