= Andrena nigripes =

Scientific classification
- Kingdom: Animalia
- Phylum: Arthropoda
- Class: Insecta
- Order: Hymenoptera
- Family: Andrenidae
- Genus: Andrena
- Species: A. nigripes

Binomial name
- Andrena nigripes Provancher, 1895

Species of bee

Andrena nigripes, the big-headed andrena, is a species of mining bee in the family Andrenidae. It is found in North America.
