= John Short (Canadian politician) =

Canadian politician

John Short (July 4, 1836 – October 16, 1886) was a farmer and political figure in Quebec. He represented Gaspé in the House of Commons of Canada from 1875 to 1878 as a Conservative member.

Born in Richmond, Upper Canada and educated in Lennoxville, Canada East, he was the son of the Reverend Robert Short and Margaret Lyon, the daughter of Captain Lyon of Aberdeen. He was the grandson of John Quirk Short, a staff surgeon and deputy inspector general of hospitals, and the great-grandson of Robert Quirk Short. In 1858, Short married Mary Charlotte Boyle. He served as mayor of Gaspé for 14 years and also served as warden for Gaspé County. Short also served as chairman of the school board and sheriff for Gaspé district. He was elected to the House of Commons in an 1875 by-election held after Louis George Harper was unseated.

His uncle Edward Short was a judge in the Quebec Superior Court and served in the legislative assembly for the Province of Canada.
