= Léopold Langlois =

Canadian politician (1913–1996)

The Honourable Léopold Langlois

Canadian Senator from Grandville
- In office July 8, 1966 – October 2, 1988
- Nominated by: Lester B. Pearson
- Appointed by: Georges Vanier
- Preceded by: Paul Henri Bouffard
- Succeeded by: John Lynch-Staunton (1990)

Member of Parliament for Gaspé
- In office June 11, 1945 – June 10, 1957
- Preceded by: Joseph Sasseville Roy
- Succeeded by: Roland English

Personal details
- Born: October 2, 1913 Sainte-Anne-des-Monts, Quebec, Canada
- Died: February 13, 1996 (aged 82)
- Party: Liberal

J. G. Léopold Langlois (French pronunciation: [leɔpɔl(d) lɑ̃ɡlwa]; October 2, 1913 – February 13, 1996) was a Canadian lawyer and parliamentarian.

Born in Ste-Anne-des-Monts, Quebec, he was a lawyer specializing in maritime law. During World War II, he served in the Royal Canadian Navy as a lieutenant commander.

In 1940, he was defeated when he ran as an Independent Liberal in the riding of Gaspé, Quebec. After the war, he was elected in 1945 as a Liberal. He was re-elected in 1949 and 1953. He was defeated in 1957. From 1951 to 1953, he was the Parliamentary Assistant to the Postmaster General. From 1953 to 1957, he was the Parliamentary Assistant to the Minister of Transport.

In 1966, he was appointed to the Senate representing the senatorial division of Grandville, Quebec. From 1974 to 1979, he was the Deputy Leader of the Government in the Senate. In 1979, he was the Deputy Leader of the Opposition in the Senate. He retired on his 75th birthday in 1988.
