= Rodolphe Lemieux =

Canadian politician (1866–1937)

The Honourable Rodolphe Lemieux PC FRSC
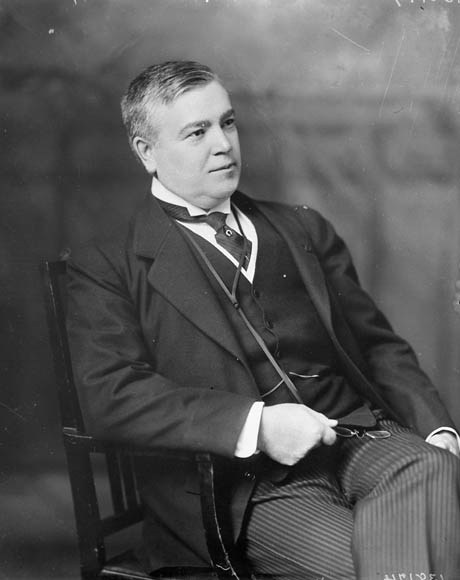

16th Speaker of the House of Commons of Canada
- In office March 8, 1922 – June 2, 1930
- Preceded by: Edgar Nelson Rhodes
- Succeeded by: George Black

Senator for Rougemont, Quebec
- In office June 3, 1930 – September 28, 1937
- Appointed by: William Lyon Mackenzie King
- Preceded by: Georges-Casimir Dessaulles
- Succeeded by: Elie Beauregard

Member of the Canadian Parliament for Gaspé
- In office 1896–1911
- Preceded by: Louis-Zéphirin Joncas
- Succeeded by: Louis-Philippe Gauthier
- In office 1917–1930
- Preceded by: Louis-Philippe Gauthier
- Succeeded by: Maurice Brasset

Member of the Canadian Parliament for Maisonneuve^{1}
- In office 1917–1921
- Preceded by: Alphonse Verville
- Succeeded by: Clément Robitaille

Member of the Canadian Parliament for Rouville
- In office 1911–1917
- Preceded by: Louis-Philippe Brodeur
- Succeeded by: The electoral district was abolished in 1914.

Member of the Canadian Parliament for Nicolet^{2}
- In office 1904–1906
- Preceded by: Georges Ball
- Succeeded by: Charles Ramsay Devlin

Personal details
- Born: November 1, 1866 Montreal, Canada East
- Died: September 28, 1937 (aged 70)
- Party: Liberal
- Cabinet: Solicitor General of Canada (1904–1906); Postmaster General (1906–1911); Minister of Labour (1906–1909); Minister of the Naval Service (1911); Minister of Marine and Fisheries (1911)
- Portfolio: Speaker of the House of Commons (1922–1930)
- ^{1}Elected for Gaspé and for Maisonneuve. Sat for both ridings.^{2}Resignation. Elected for Gaspé and for Nicolet. Chose to sit for Gaspé.

Rodolphe Lemieux PC FRSC (French pronunciation: [ʁɔdɔlf ləmjø]; November 1, 1866 – September 28, 1937) was a Canadian parliamentarian and long time Speaker of the House of Commons of Canada (1922–1930).

== Biography ==
He was born in Montreal as the son of a Customs officer. After a career as a journalist, lawyer and law professor he was elected to the House of Commons of Canada in the 1896 election as a Liberal. He was a loyal follower of Sir Wilfrid Laurier and, in 1904 became Solicitor General of Canada in Laurier's Cabinet. He subsequently served as Postmaster General of Canada, Minister of Labour and Minister of Marine and Fisheries. His Deputy Minister in the Department of Labour was future Prime Minister of Canada, William Lyon Mackenzie King.

As Minister of Labour he started a system in which no strike or lockout in a public utility or mine could be legal until the differences had been referred to a three-man board of conciliation representing the employer, the employees and the public.

In 1907, Laurier sent Lemieux to Japan to defend Canadian immigration policies which were discriminatory against the Japanese. He succeeded in obtaining an agreement from Japan to curtail emigration of its citizens to Canada.

He also continued in his academic pursuits, becoming a fellow of the Royal Society of Canada in 1908 and President of the Society in 1918.

In the 1911 election, Lemieux engaged in a series of public debates before audiences of several thousands with nationalist leader Henri Bourassa who was threatening the Liberal's base in Quebec. The Liberals retained a majority of seats in the province but lost government because of its loss of seats in Ontario.

Lemieux was a sharp critic of the Conservative government of Robert Borden accusing it of putting the interests of the British Empire ahead of those of Canada.

During World War I, Lemieux opposed conscription and supported Laurier during the Conscription Crisis of 1917.

When Mackenzie King led the Liberals back to power in the 1921 election, he chose Ernest Lapointe as his Quebec lieutenant rather than Lemieux. Instead, he nominated Lemieux as Speaker of the House of Commons. Lemieux presided over the House during several minority governments.

He was Speaker during the King-Byng Affair of 1926. He remained Speaker when Governor General Byng appointed Arthur Meighen as Prime Minister rather than call an election.

He attempted to rule in a neutral manner despite the highly charged atmosphere, and all but one of his rulings were sustained by the House. Instead Lord Byng invited the Conservatives to form a government. In spite of assurances of support from the Progressive Party, the Conservatives were unable to maintain control of the House. Lemieux had to make several crucial rulings. Five were appealed and one was overturned.

Lemieux presided over three successive Parliaments and was the longest serving Speaker until Lucien Lamoureux broke the record in 1974.

On June 30, 1930, King appointed Lemieux to the Senate of Canada, where he served until his death in 1937. He was entombed at the Notre Dame des Neiges Cemetery in Montreal.

1904 Canadian federal election: Nicolet
Party	Candidate	Votes
Liberal	Rodolphe Lemieux	2,698
Conservative	Georges Ball	2,356

== Archives ==
There is a Rodolphe Lemieux fonds at Library and Archives Canada.

== Electoral record ==
1911 Canadian federal election: Rouville
Party	Candidate	Votes
Liberal	Rodolphe Lemieux	1,467
Conservative	Hormidas Dubreuil	1,189

Professional and academic associations
Preceded by William Douw Lighthall	President of the Royal Society of Canada; 1918–1919	Succeeded by Robert Fulford Ruttan
