= Îles-de-la-Madeleine (federal electoral district) =

Former federal electoral district in Quebec, Canada

Quebec electoral district

Defunct federal electoral district
- Legislature: House of Commons
- District created: 1947
- District abolished: 1967
- First contested: 1949
- Last contested: 1965

Îles-de-la-Madeleine (French pronunciation: [il də la madlɛn]) was a federal electoral district in Quebec, Canada, that was represented in the House of Commons of Canada from 1949 to 1968.

This riding was created in 1947 from Gaspé riding. It consisted of the county of Iles-de-la-Madeleine. The electoral district was abolished in 1966 when it was merged into Bonaventure riding.

== Members of Parliament ==
This riding elected the following members of Parliament:

Parliament	Years	Member	Party
Îles-de-la-Madeleine; Riding created from Gaspé
21st	1949–1953	Charles Cannon	Liberal
22nd	1953–1957	Charles Cannon	Liberal
23rd	1957–1958	Charles Cannon	Liberal
24th	1958–1962	Russell Keays	Progressive Conservative
25th	1962–1963	Maurice Sauvé	Liberal
26th	1963–1965	Maurice Sauvé	Liberal
27th	1965–1968	Maurice Sauvé	Liberal
Riding dissolved into Bonaventure

== Election results ==
1949 Canadian federal election
Party	Candidate	Votes
Liberal	Charles Cannon	2,203
Independent PC	Joseph-Pierre-Albert Sévigny	2,145

1953 Canadian federal election
Party	Candidate	Votes
Liberal	Charles Cannon	2,337
Progressive Conservative	Albert Sylvain	1,937

1957 Canadian federal election
Party	Candidate	Votes
Liberal	Charles Cannon	2,472
Independent	Raymond Maher	2,145
Independent Liberal	Jacques Pinault	31

1958 Canadian federal election
Party	Candidate	Votes
Progressive Conservative	Russell Keays	2,471
Liberal	Charles Cannon	2,115
Independent PC	Félix-Armand Painchaud	146

1962 Canadian federal election
Party	Candidate	Votes
Liberal	Maurice Sauvé	2,765
Progressive Conservative	Russell Keays	2,230
Social Credit	Alexandre Bertrand	67

1963 Canadian federal election
Party	Candidate	Votes
Liberal	Maurice Sauvé	3,053
Social Credit	Fernand Turbide	1,568
Progressive Conservative	Gérard Mecteau	183

1965 Canadian federal election
Party	Candidate	Votes
Liberal	Maurice Sauvé	2,860
Progressive Conservative	Marc Arsenault	2,468
Ralliement créditiste	Jacques-O. Lévesque	38
New Democratic	Maurice Giguère	20

== See also ==
- List of Canadian electoral districts
- Historical federal electoral districts of Canada
