= Pierre-Étienne Fortin =

Canadian politician

The Honourable Pierre-Étienne Fortin
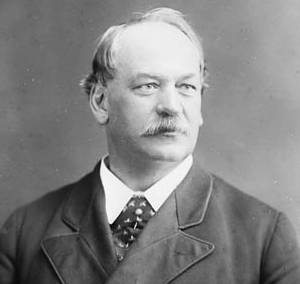

Member of the Canadian Parliament for Gaspé
- In office 1867–1874
- Succeeded by: Louis George Harper
- In office 1878–1887
- Preceded by: John Short
- Succeeded by: Louis-Zéphirin Joncas

Member of the Legislative Assembly of Quebec for Gaspé
- In office 1867–1878
- Succeeded by: Edmund James Flynn

2nd Speaker of the Legislative Assembly of Quebec
- In office November 4, 1875 – November 9, 1876
- Preceded by: Joseph-Goderic Blanchet
- Succeeded by: Louis Beaubien

Senator for Kennebec, Quebec
- In office May 13, 1887 – June 15, 1888
- Preceded by: Charles Cormier
- Succeeded by: George Alexander Drummond

Personal details
- Born: December 14, 1823 Verchères, Lower Canada
- Died: June 15, 1888 (aged 64) Laprairie (La Prairie), Quebec
- Party: Conservative
- Other political affiliations: Conservative Party of Quebec

Pierre-Étienne Fortin (French pronunciation: [pjɛʁ etjɛn fɔʁtɛ̃]; December 14, 1823 – June 15, 1888) was a medical doctor and political figure in Quebec, Canada. He represented Gaspé in the House of Commons of Canada as a Conservative member from 1867 to 1874 and from 1878 to 1887, he also represented Gaspé in the Legislative Assembly of Quebec from 1867 to 1878. In 1887, he was appointed to the Senate of Canada for Kennebec division.

== Biography ==
He was born in Verchères, Lower Canada in 1823, grew up in Laprairie and studied at the Petit Séminaire de Montréal. His uncle was Ludger Duvernay, Patriote and publisher of La Minerve. Fortin graduated from McGill College in medicine in 1845 and practiced at Laprairie. He helped treat patients during the typhus epidemic of 1847-48 at Grosse-Île. In 1849, he led a group of mounted constables that controlled riots after the passing of the Rebellion Losses Bill. From 1852 to 1867, he served as magistrate protecting fisheries in the Gulf of Saint Lawrence. Fortin also served as customs agent in the Gulf and, with his ship, La Canadienne, was the sole guardian of law and order in this region. During this period, Fortin also published a list of fish found in the Gulf region and prepared descriptions of marine mammals found there.

In 1867, he was elected to the federal and provincial legislatures for Gaspé. He was named commissioner of crown lands in the provincial executive council but resigned in 1874 after a scandal implicating the party in power. In the same year, he resigned from federal politics after it became illegal to hold seats in both houses. In 1875, he was named speaker for the provincial assembly; he was forced to resign in 1876 after allegations of improper procedures in his election. Although he was later exonerated, a replacement had already been chosen. While in office, he helped promote the development of the Baie de Chaleur Railway, telegraph service connecting the Gaspé peninsula to the rest of the province and the installation of lighthouses in the region. Fortin also helped to establish formal education in navigation in Canada. He opposed reciprocity with the United States and was a strong defender of Canadian fishing rights. He helped found the Société de Géographie de Québec and served as its first president.

He died in Laprairie in 1888, while still a member of the Senate.

In 2002, the Quebec Ministère des Ressources naturelles et de la Faune named a wildlife reserve on the Richelieu River after Pierre-Étienne Fortin.
