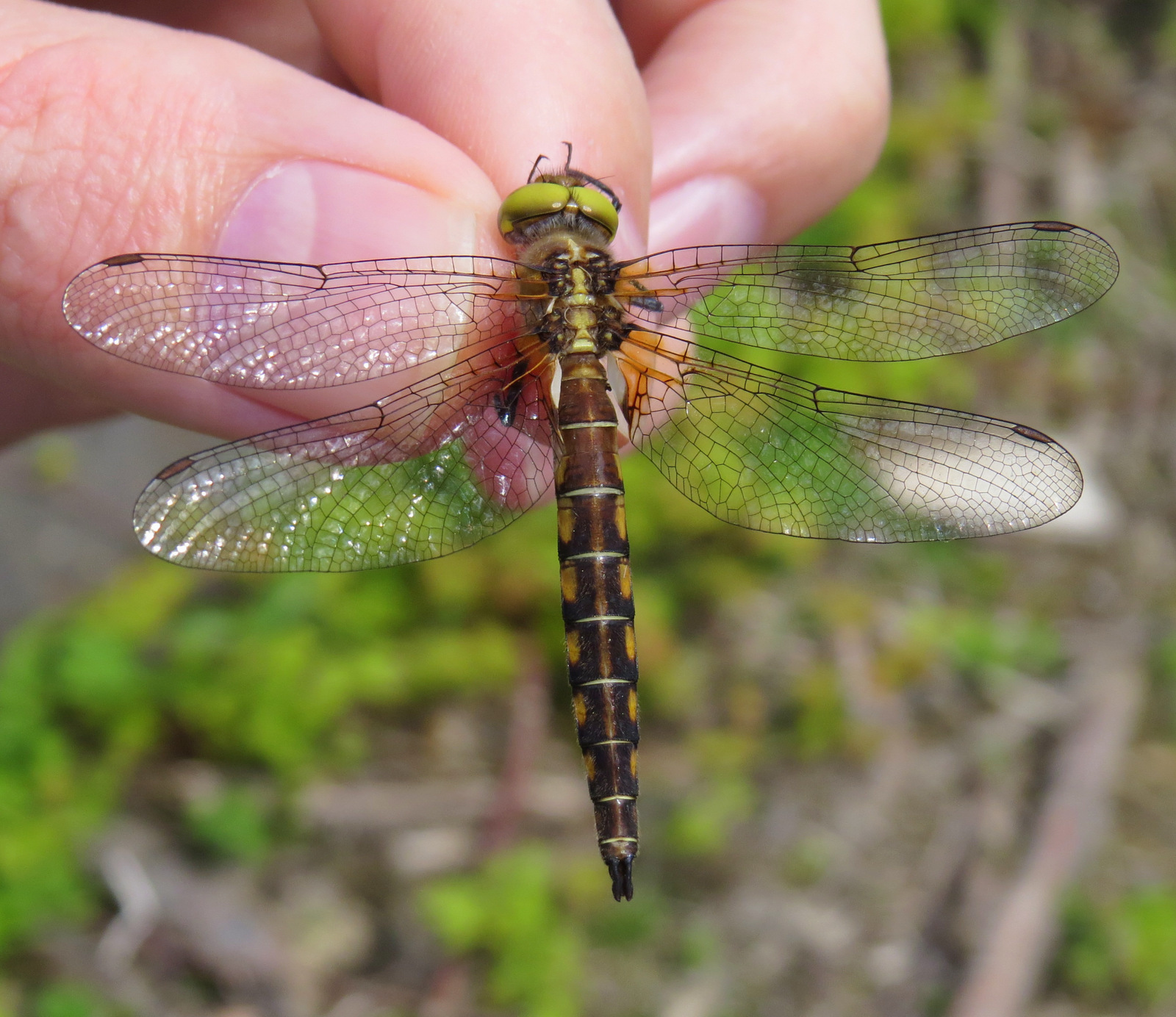
- Male

Conservation status
- Least Concern (IUCN 3.1)

Scientific classification
- Kingdom: Animalia
- Phylum: Arthropoda
- Clade: Pancrustacea
- Class: Insecta
- Order: Odonata
- Suborder: Anisoptera
- Superfamily: Libelluloidea
- Family: Corduliidae
- Genus: Neurocordulia
- Species: N. michaeli

Binomial name
- Neurocordulia michaeli Brunelle, 2000

= Neurocordulia michaeli =

Species of dragonfly

Neurocordulia michaeli, the broad-tailed shadowdragon, is a species of dragonfly in the family Corduliidae. It is found in Canada and the United States. Its natural habitat is rivers.

== Similar species ==
These are some similar species to Neurocordulia michaeli:

- Neurocordulia yamaskanensis

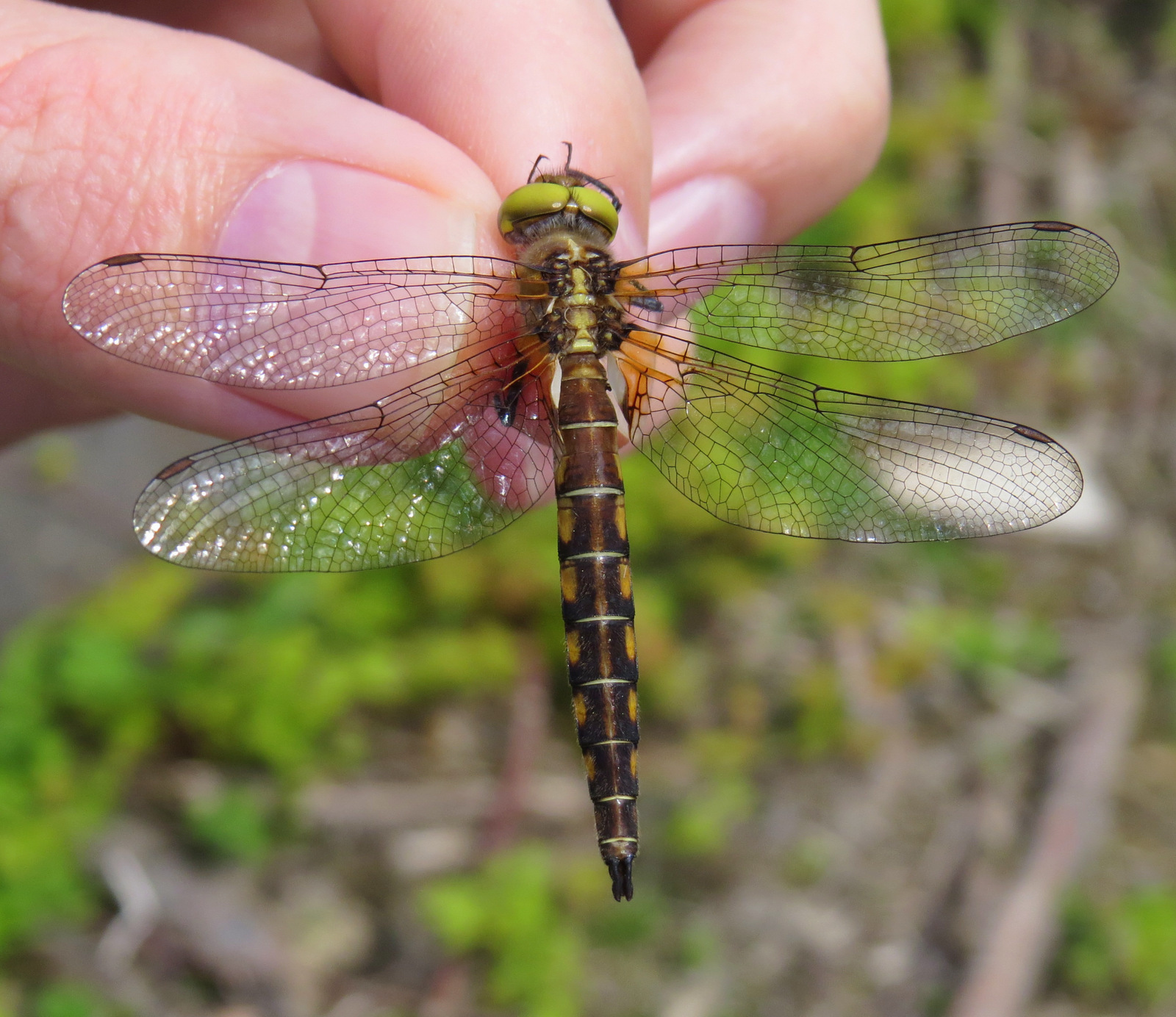
Broad tailed shadowdragon

- Epitheca princeps

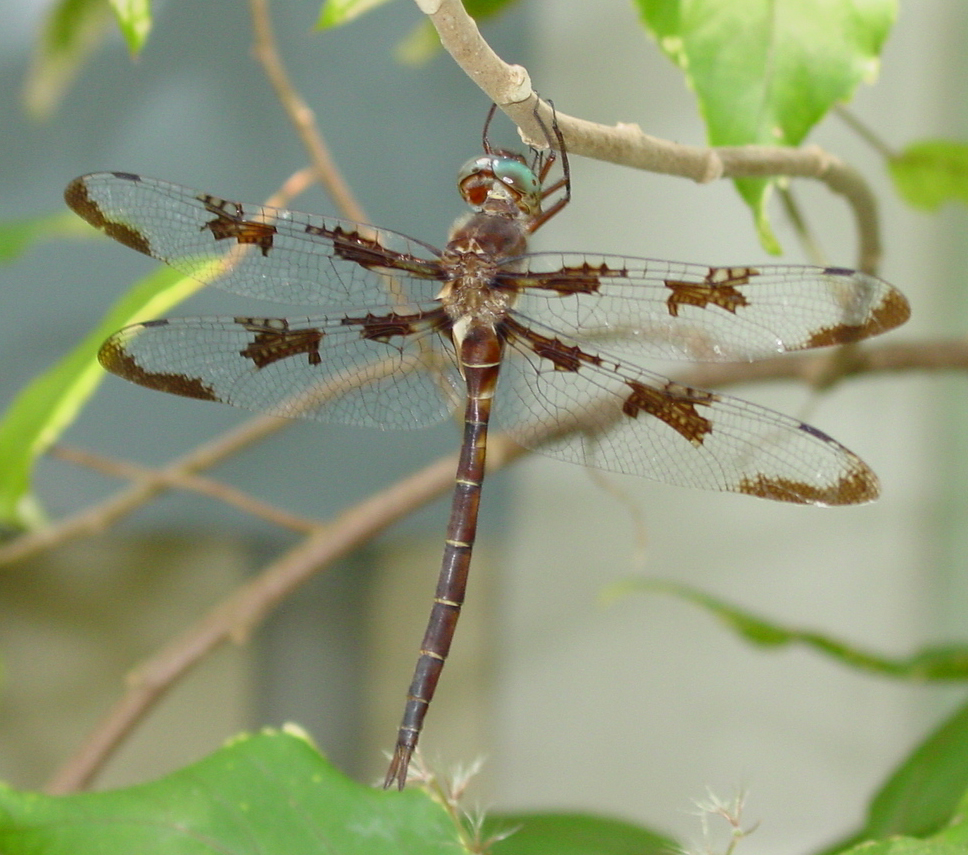
Prince Baskettail
