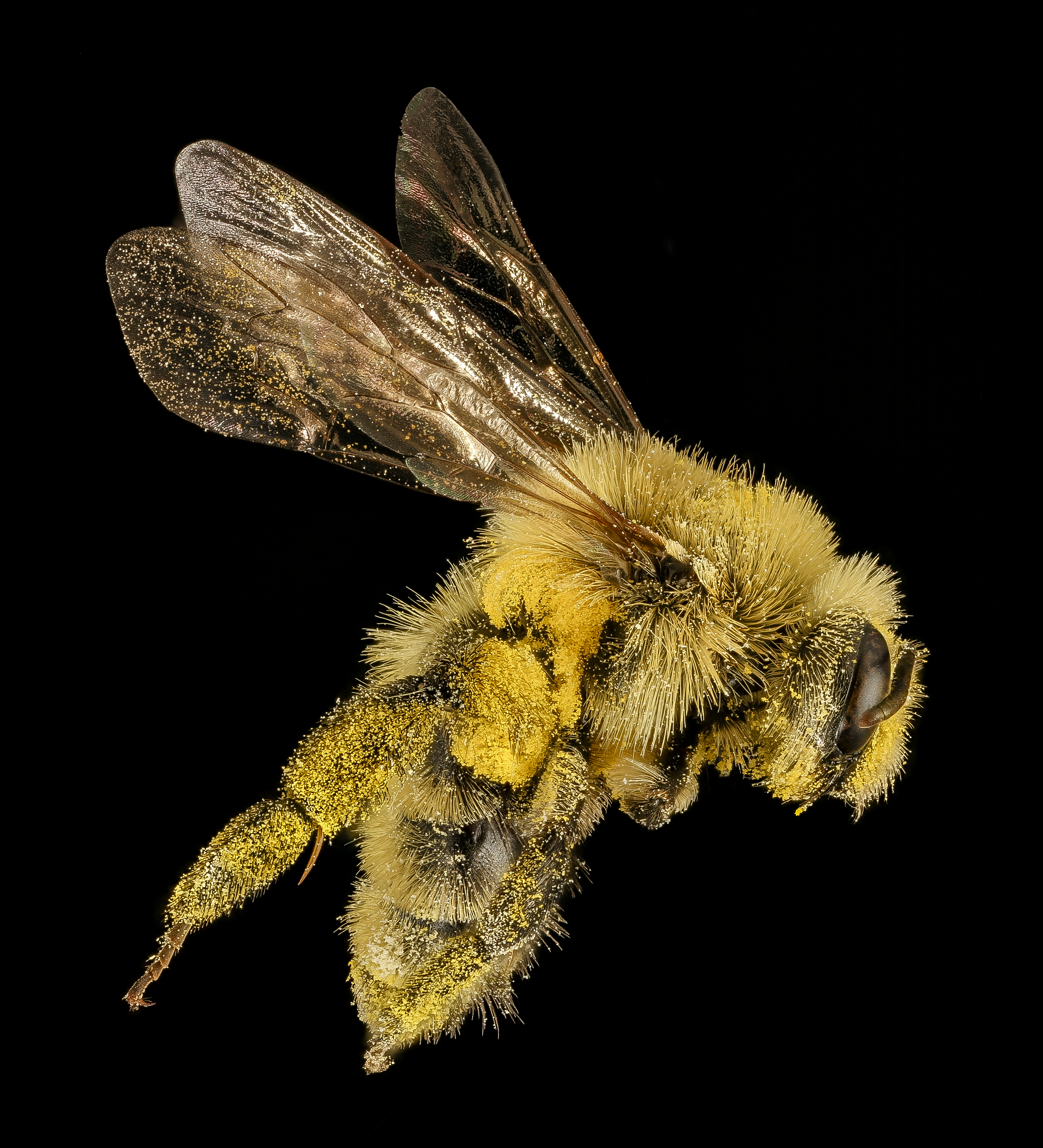

Scientific classification
- Kingdom: Animalia
- Phylum: Arthropoda
- Class: Insecta
- Order: Hymenoptera
- Family: Andrenidae
- Genus: Andrena
- Species: A. hirticincta

Binomial name
- Andrena hirticincta Provancher, 1888

= Andrena hirticincta =

Species of bee

The hairy-belted miner bee (Andrena hirticincta) is a species of miner bee in the family Andrenidae. Another common name for this species is the hairy-banded andrena. It is found in North America.
