= Charles Cannon (Quebec politician) =

Canadian politician

Member of Parliament for Îles-de-la-Madeleine
- In office June 1949 – March 1958
- Preceded by: riding created
- Succeeded by: Russell Keays

Personal details
- Born: Charles-Arthur Dumoulin Cannon; 11 September 1905 Quebec City, Quebec
- Died: 23 September 1976 (aged 71) Quebec City, Quebec
- Party: Liberal
- Profession: lawyer

Charles-Arthur Dumoulin Cannon (11 September 1905 – 23 September 1976) was a Liberal party member of the House of Commons of Canada. He was a lawyer by career.

He was first elected at the Îles-de-la-Madeleine riding in the 1949 general election. Cannon was re-elected for successive terms there in 1953 and 1957. After completing his final term, the 23rd Canadian Parliament, Cannon was defeated by Russell Keays of the Progressive Conservative party.

Some of Cannon's relatives have also been Members of Parliament, namely his grandfather Charles Fitzpatrick, his uncle Lucien Cannon and his first cousin once removed Lawrence Cannon.
