= Louis-Zéphirin Joncas =

Canadian politician (1846-1903)

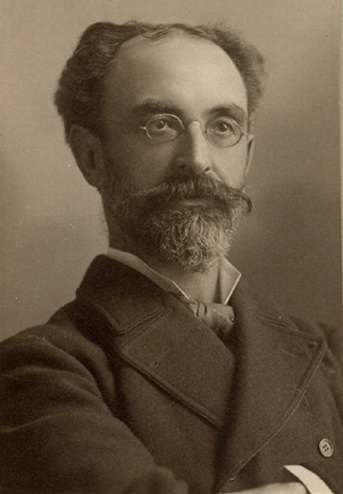

Member of the Canadian Parliament for Gaspé
- In office 1887–1896
- Preceded by: Pierre-Étienne Fortin
- Succeeded by: Rodolphe Lemieux

Personal details
- Born: July 26, 1846 Grande-Rivière, Lower Canada
- Died: March 28, 1903 (aged 56) Quebec City, Quebec, Canada
- Party: Conservative

Louis-Zéphirin Joncas (26 July 1846 – 28 March 1903) was a Canadian civil servant, journalist and politician.

Born in Grande-Rivière, Lower Canada, the son of Léon Joncas and Esther Beaudin, Joncas was educated at the Collège Masson in Terrebonne and studied law in Montreal. He came back to Grande-Rivière to help his family financially and was a teacher. He later worked as an accountant, general agent, and manager of the Gaspé Fishing Company in Grande-Rivière.

From 1876 to 1887, he was the sheriff for Gaspé county. He was elected to the House of Commons of Canada for the electoral district of Gaspé in the 1887 federal election. A Conservative, he was re-elected by acclamation in the 1891 election. He did not run in the 1896 election.

From 1892 to 1897, he was also the editor of the newspaper L’Événement. In 1896, he was appointed superintendent of fisheries and game by Quebec premier Edmund James Flynn. He served in this post until his death in Quebec City in 1903.
