= Maurice Sauvé =

Canadian politician

The Honourable Maurice Sauvé PC CC
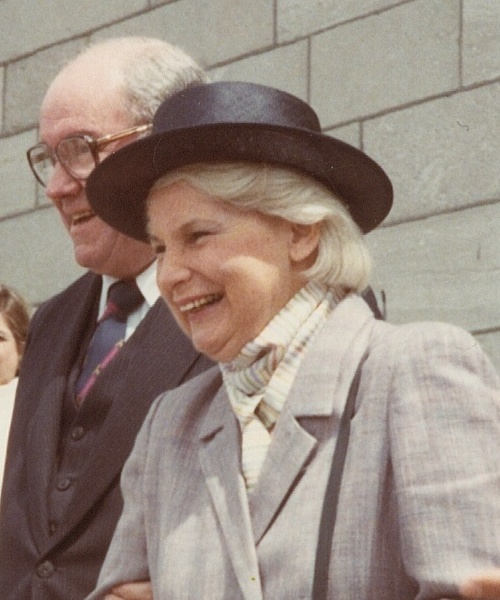
- Sauvé in 1984 with his wife, Jeanne

Viceregal consort of Canada
- In office May 14, 1984 – January 28, 1990
- Preceded by: Lily Schreyer
- Succeeded by: Gerda Hnatyshyn

Member of Parliament for Îles-de-la-Madeleine
- In office June 18, 1962 – June 24, 1968
- Preceded by: Russell Keays
- Succeeded by: District dissolved

Personal details
- Born: September 20, 1923 Montreal, Quebec, Canada
- Died: April 13, 1992 (aged 68) Montreal, Quebec, Canada
- Party: Liberal
- Spouse: Jeanne Mathilde Benoît (m. 1948)
- Profession: Economist

Maurice Sauvé PC CC (French pronunciation: [mɔʁis sove]; September 20, 1923 – April 13, 1992) was a Canadian economist, politician, cabinet minister and businessman. He was the husband of Jeanne Sauvé, who served as 23rd Governor General of Canada.

== Life and career ==
Born in Montreal, Quebec, he was the first president of the World Assembly of Youth and served during the period from 1949 to 1952.

He was elected to the House of Commons of Canada in the 1962 federal elections as a Liberal candidate, representing the riding of Îles-de-la-Madeleine. He was re-elected in 1963 and 1965. He was defeated in 1968. From 1964 to 1968, he was the Minister of Forestry (after 1966 renamed Minister of Forestry and Rural Development).

In 1984, he was made a Companion of the Order of Canada as the viceregal consort of Canada. From 1985 to 1991, he was chancellor of the University of Ottawa.

== Arms ==
Coat of arms of Maurice Sauvé

Crest
A lion’s head couped Sable langued Gules charged at the neck with a crescent Argent
Escutcheon
Argent, a torch in pale Azure enflamed Gules within a bordure of ten fleurs-de-lis Azure
Supporters
On a grassy mount Vert, dexter a lion Or gorged with a collar of laurel leaves Vert and sinister a lynx Or gorged with a collar of maple leaves Gules
Motto
RIEN NE CRAINS, meaning "I fear nothing"

== Archives ==
There is a Maurice Sauvé fonds at Library and Archives Canada.

Honorary titles
Preceded by Lily Schreyer	Viceregal consort of Canada; 1984–1990	Succeeded by Gerda Hnatyshyn
Political offices
Preceded by John Robert Nicholson	Minister of Forestry; 1964–1966	Succeeded by The office of Minister of Forestry was abolished in 1966.
Preceded by The office of Minister of Forestry and Rural Development was created in 1966.	Minister of Forestry and Rural Development; 1966–1968	Succeeded by Jean Marchand
Academic offices
Preceded by Gabrielle Léger	Chancellor of the University of Ottawa; 1985–1990	Succeeded by Gordon Henderson
