= Paul Henri Bouffard =

Canadian politician

The Honourable Paul Henri Bouffard QC
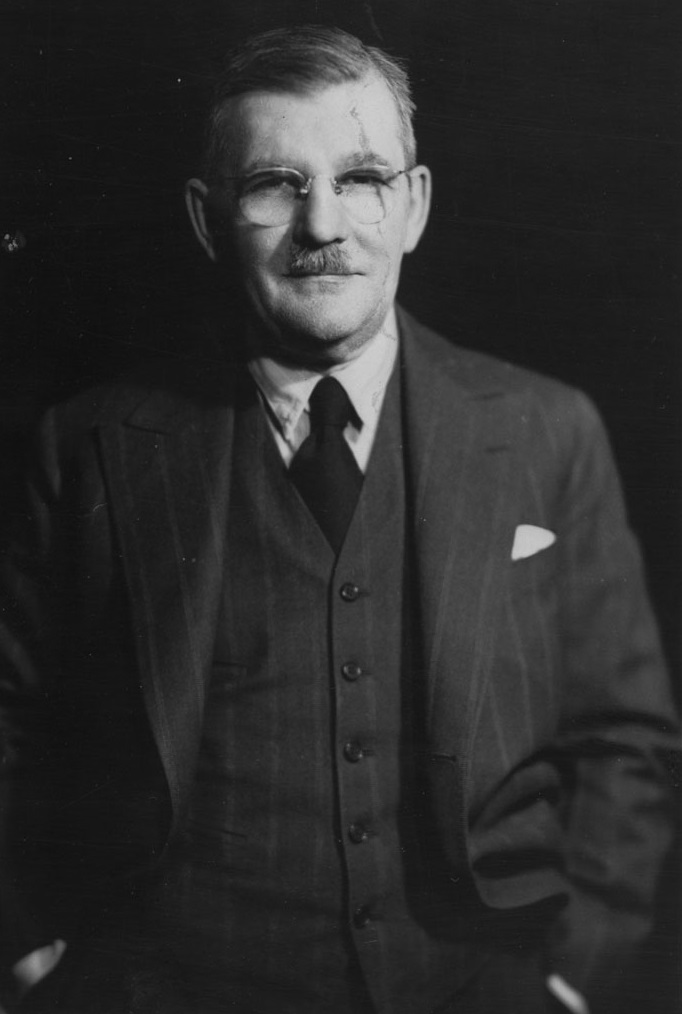

Canadian Senator from Grandville
- In office 27 December 1946 – 16 February 1966
- Preceded by: Thomas Chapais
- Succeeded by: Léopold Langlois

Personal details
- Born: Paul Henri Bouffard; 5 April 1895 Quebec City, Quebec, Canada
- Died: 16 February 1966 (aged 70) Quebec City, Quebec, Canada
- Party: Liberal
- Spouse: Margaret Hachette
- Profession: Lawyer; professor

Paul Henri Bouffard QC (5 April 1895 – 16 February 1966) was a Liberal party member of the Senate of Canada. He was born in Quebec City, Quebec and became a lawyer and professor.

The son of Pierre Bouffard and E. Vachon, he was educated at the Séminaire de Québec and the Université Laval. Bouffard was called to the Quebec bar in 1918 and practised law in Quebec City. In 1928, he was named King's Counsel. Bouffard was professor of Commercial Law at the Université Laval. He was vice-president for two insurance companies and the Champlain Paper Box Company and served as director for a number of companies, including the Saint Lawrence Cement Company (now part of Holcim), Royal Bank of Canada, Wabasso Cotton Company Limited and the Dow Brewery. In 1961, Bouffard was appointed as a board member of the Shawinigan Water & Power Company.

He was appointed to the Senate on 27 December 1946 as nominated by Prime Minister William Lyon Mackenzie King and remained in that role until his death on 16 February 1966.
