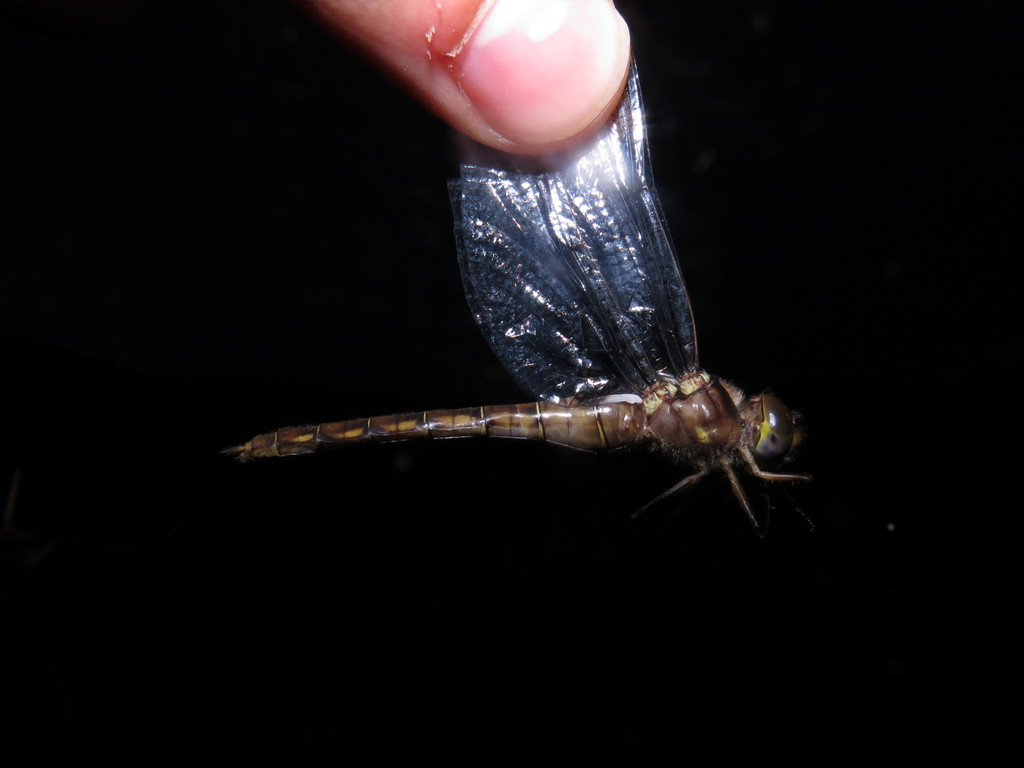

Conservation status
- Least Concern (IUCN 3.1)

- Secure (NatureServe)

Scientific classification
- Kingdom: Animalia
- Phylum: Arthropoda
- Class: Insecta
- Order: Odonata
- Infraorder: Anisoptera
- Family: Corduliidae
- Genus: Neurocordulia
- Species: N. yamaskanensis

Binomial name
- Neurocordulia yamaskanensis (Provancher, 1875)

= Neurocordulia yamaskanensis =

Species of dragonfly

Neurocordulia yamaskanensis, the Stygian shadowdragon, is a dragonfly found in the eastern United States and southern Canada. It was discovered in Quebec in 1875 by naturalist Léon Abel Provancher.

Like other dragonflies of the genus Neurocordulia, this species has the unusual characteristic of being crepuscular in habit, meaning that they are only active for a short period of time during dawn and at dusk. This limited activity period means that this species and other members of the genus are rarely seen by the casual observer. They may occasionally fly during very overcast days, but usually spend their days roosting in treetops and bushes near the shoreline of the streams, rivers and lakes which they patrol during their active hours.

The Stygian shadowdragon's range includes much of the mid-Atlantic US states and extends northward into southern Canada and south to the Mason–Dixon line. It is one of the larger members of the shadowdragon genus, at about 2 inches long. Their fairly clear wings have a large brown spot at the bases, which can help differentiate them from other shadowdragons.

Because of its short activity period, less is known about its life cycle than many other dragonflies. The nymphs probably live in the stream beds which this species inhabits for a year or more before they crawl out onto rocks or trees along the stream or river where the adults emerge from their exoskeletons and take flight. This species is seen mostly during the month of June throughout its range.
