= Joseph Sasseville Roy =

Canadian politician

J. Sasseville Roy
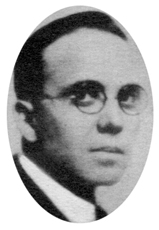

Member of Parliament for Gaspé
- In office March 1940 – June 1945
- Preceded by: Maurice Brasset
- Succeeded by: Léopold Langlois

Personal details
- Born: Joseph Sasseville Roy; 21 August 1895 Cap-Chat, Quebec, Canada
- Died: 10 April 1970 (aged 74) Gaspé, Quebec, Canada
- Party: Independent Conservative, Independent
- Spouse(s): Hélène Baillargeon (m. 1 Sep 1920)
- Profession: Agent, businessman

Joseph Sasseville Roy (21 August 1895 – 10 April 1970) was a Quebec businessman and political figure who represented Gaspé in the House of Commons of Canada as an Independent Conservative and then as an Independent member from 1940 to 1945.

A native of Cap-Chat and the son of Wilfrid Roy, Joseph Sasseville Roy married Hélène, the daughter of Trefflé Baillargeon, in 1920. He ran unsuccessfully in the riding of Abitibi for a seat in the Legislative Assembly of Quebec in 1927 and 1931 as a Quebec Conservative Party candidate. Roy distanced himself from the Conservatives in 1941 after disagreeing with them on the subject of conscription and subsequently joined the "Independent Group" of anti-conscription MPs led by Frédéric Dorion. He was unsuccessful in his re-election bids to represent the Gaspé constituency in 1945 when he ran for re-election as an independent and again in 1949 when he was the Progressive Conservative candidate. During World War II, he was criticized by the Canadian military for raising the issue of German U-boat attacks in the Gulf of Saint Lawrence. He wished to ensure that merchant ships were being protected; the military wished to prevent information leaking back to the enemy.

In 1961, Sasseville Roy was nominated for the position of president of the Federal Progressive Conservative Association of Quebec but withdrew in favour of Luce Pelland-Sauvé, the widow of Paul Sauvé. He died in 1970.
