= Neurocordulia virginiensis =

Conservation status
- Least Concern (IUCN 3.1)

Scientific classification
- Kingdom: Animalia
- Phylum: Arthropoda
- Class: Insecta
- Order: Odonata
- Infraorder: Anisoptera
- Family: Corduliidae
- Genus: Neurocordulia
- Species: N. virginiensis

Binomial name
- Neurocordulia virginiensis Davis, 1927

Species of dragonfly

Neurocordulia virginiensis, the cinnamon shadowdragon, is a species of emerald dragonfly in the family Corduliidae. It is found in North America.

The IUCN conservation status of Neurocordulia virginiensis is "LC", least concern, with no immediate threat to the species' survival. The population is stable.
