= Alexandre Cyr =

Canadian politician

Member of Parliament for Gaspé
- In office 8 April 1963 – 8 November 1965
- Preceded by: Roland English
- Succeeded by: Russell Keays
- In office 25 June 1968 – 4 September 1984
- Preceded by: Russell Keays
- Succeeded by: Charles-Eugène Marin

Personal details
- Born: 12 November 1922 Chandler, Quebec
- Died: 17 August 2006 (aged 83) Ottawa, Ontario
- Party: Liberal
- Spouse: Lorraine Fortin
- Profession: Accountant, businessman, executive, public servant

Alexandre Cyr (12 November 1922 – 17 August 2006) was a Liberal party member of the House of Commons of Canada. He was born in Chandler, Quebec and his career included several positions including businessman, executive, accountant, public servant, secretary and secretary-treasurer.

Cyr was first elected at the Gaspé electoral district in the 1963 federal election. He was defeated there in the 1965 election, but regained the seat in the following election in 1968. He was re-elected for successive terms in 1972, 1974, 1979 and 1980.

In the 1984 federal election, Cyr was defeated by Charles-Eugène Marin of the Progressive Conservative party.
