= Maurice Brasset =

Canadian politician

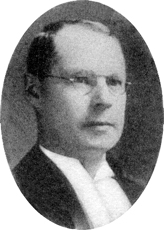

Member of the Canadian Parliament for Gaspé
- In office 1930–1940
- Preceded by: Rodolphe Lemieux
- Succeeded by: Joseph-Sasseville Roy

Personal details
- Born: April 12, 1884 Havre-Aubert, Quebec, Canada
- Died: April 5, 1971 (aged 86)
- Party: Liberal
- Occupation: lawyer

Maurice Brasset (April 12, 1884 in Havre-Aubert, Quebec, Canada – April 5, 1971) was a Canadian politician and lawyer. He was elected to the House of Commons of Canada in the 1930 election as a Member of the Liberal Party to represent the riding of Gaspé. He was re-elected in 1935 and defeated in 1940.
