= Gerda Hnatyshyn =

Canadian politician (1935–2023)

Karen Gerda Hnatyshyn CC (/nəˈtɪʃən/ nə-TISH-ən; née Nygaard Andreasen; August 14, 1935 – July 14, 2023) was a viceregal consort of Canada, who held the role from 1990 to 1995 during her husband Ray Hnatyshyn's term as Governor General of Canada. From 2002 to 2023, she served as President of The Hnatyshyn Foundation, a private charity dedicated to promoting and funding emerging, developing and mid-career artists and curators in Canada through scholarships and prizes totalling over $200,000 annually. She died on July 14, 2023, in Ottawa.

Born in Winnipeg, Manitoba, she attended the University of Saskatchewan and graduated with a bachelor of science degree in dietetics and nutrition. After an internship at the Royal Victoria Hospital in Montreal, she worked as a hospital dietitian in Saskatoon and Ottawa. She married Hnatyshyn in January 1960. The couple had two sons, John Georg Hnatyshyn and Carl Andrew Nygaard Hnatyshyn.

As the spouse of a Governor General, she was also invested as a Companion of the Order of Canada upon Ray Hnatyshyn's swearing-in.

In 1993, she hosted the premiere of an educational video promoting the importance of a healthy diet for people living with HIV/AIDS.

Hnatyshyn co-authored Rideau Hall: Canada's Living Heritage, a book about the history of Rideau Hall, in 1995, with the proceeds going to make purchases of art and furnishings for the official residence. She also worked with the Canadian Heritage Garden Foundation to develop a heritage garden in the grounds of Rideau Hall.

Gerda Hnatyshyn died on July 14, 2023, at the age of 87.

Honorary titles
Preceded by Maurice Sauvé	Viceregal Consort of Canada; 1990–1995	Succeeded by Diana Fowler LeBlanc
