= Louis-Philippe Gauthier =

Canadian politician (1876–1946)

Louis-Philippe Gauthier (January 17, 1876 – July 7, 1946) was a physician and political figure in Quebec, Canada. He represented Gaspé in the House of Commons of Canada from 1911 to 1917 as a Conservative.

He was born in Sainte-Anne-des-Monts, Quebec, the son of Jean Gauthier and Marie-Sarah Perée, and was educated at the Séminaire de Rimouski, the Collège de Lévis and the Université Laval. He practised medicine in Sainte-Anne-des-Monts. In 1901, Gauthier married Marie-Antoinette Thibault. He served overseas during World War I, reaching the rank of major. Gauthier was defeated when he ran for reelection in 1917. He served as assistant clerk of the Senate from 1926 to 1946. Gauther died in Ottawa at the age of 70.

His grandson Jean-Robert Gauthier served in the House of Commons and Senate.

While serving, Gauthier was made prisoner by the enemies, survived Spanish flu, finally escaped in the woods before making his way back to his family in Ottawa.

He helped in protecting the French heritage of Canada during his serving years.
