= Don Tomas =

Don Tomas or Don Tomás or Donn Thomas may refer to

- Don Tomas, a value-priced brand of cigars made by General Cigar Company
- Don Tomás Lagoon, a lagoon in Santa Rosa, La Pampa, Argentina
- Don Tomás Urquidez (fl. 1853), California homesteader and builder of the first house in Hollywood; see Outpost Estates, Los Angeles § History

== See also ==
- Donald Thomas (disambiguation)
