= William Couper (naturalist) =

- Citizenship: American
- Known for: Entomological work, magazine editor
- Scientific career
- Fields: Natural history
- Author abbrev. (zoology): Couper

William Couper (fl. 1850s–1886) was an American entomologist and naturalist who came to prominence during the later half of the 19th century in Canada. The better known period of his life spans from the 1850s to 1886.

== Biography ==
Effectively nothing is known of Couper's early life, although it is speculated that he was born in Sheldon, Vermont. He came to Canada and established himself in Toronto likely around 1843 (he later noted having lived there for 17 years, and left the city in 1860). A conference by Henry Holmes Croft, a University College teacher, spurred him into collecting his first specimens. A few years later his collections of insects and various related structures (nests, cocoons, galleries...) were noticed and praised in The Canadian Journal, an interest he would maintain (1863 he noted these collections to amount to 6 000 specimens). These collections were prized in 1856. Although entomology and ornithology (particularly the former) were his main interests, he was, like most scientists of the time, very versatile. In addition to working as a typographer, he owned a small shop where he sold specimens and taxidermy material. His major publication was a description of 150 Canadian Coleoptera species.

Sometime around 1860 he moved to Quebec City. There he initiated Léon Abel Provancher to entomology, and probably taught taxidermy to Charles-Eusèbe Dionne. In 1863, he was involved with the foundation of the Entomological Society of Canada, and a few years later, the affiliated society in Quebec, in which Provancher, Louis-Ovide Brunet and George John Bowles were involved, amongst others. That branch, however, only. lasted a few years. While residing there, he traveled to Côte-Nord and made the first detailed description of the region. Those notes later served a number of other scientists. He also described 15 new species of Coleoptera, a number of which are still valid. In 1867, Henry J. Morgan called him one of the first Canadian entomologists in his Bibliotheca Canadensis. Before moving to Montreal in 1870, he spent a year (or three) in Ottawa, what exactly he did is not known (possibly he studied spiders), but he wrote several short papers in The Canadian Entomologist during that period.

It was in to Montreal that he made his most important contribution to Quebec entomology by being the first president of another affiliate of the Entomological Society of Canada, which lasted to become the Entomological Society of Quebec. He traveled several times more to Côte-Nord, once having to return because his commissioned specimens were lost on the way home, and later collected with Napoléon-Alexandre Comeau. In 1880 he started publishing The Canadian Sportsman and Naturalist, which would stay in publication for 3 years until lack of time forced him to discontinue it. The Canadian Sportsman and Naturalist published articles on a wide array of topics, from hunting to Canadian museum.

The next year Couper moved to Troy, in the state of New York, where he joined his son. He would publish a few more papers in American magazines and journals before his death, probably ca. 1890. He was known to also have a daughter, but the names of his children, or of their mother, are unknown.

== Legacy ==
Couper's work is little known, both because good chunks of his life are left entirely in the dark and because many of his publications have become exceedingly difficult to locate, particularly The Canadian Sportsman and Naturalist. His specimens have also been scattered: the Lyman Museum of McGill University owns many of his Coleoptera specimens, and a number of moths. Laval also owns a large collection of insects and a number of higher animals. Other naturalized specimens are scattered between various institutions, from the Royal Ontario Museum to the Smithsonian Institution. He remained all his life an enthusiastic promoter of entomology, and his influence on the work of those who followed his lead in the early years of Canadian Entomology is perhaps his greatest legacy.
