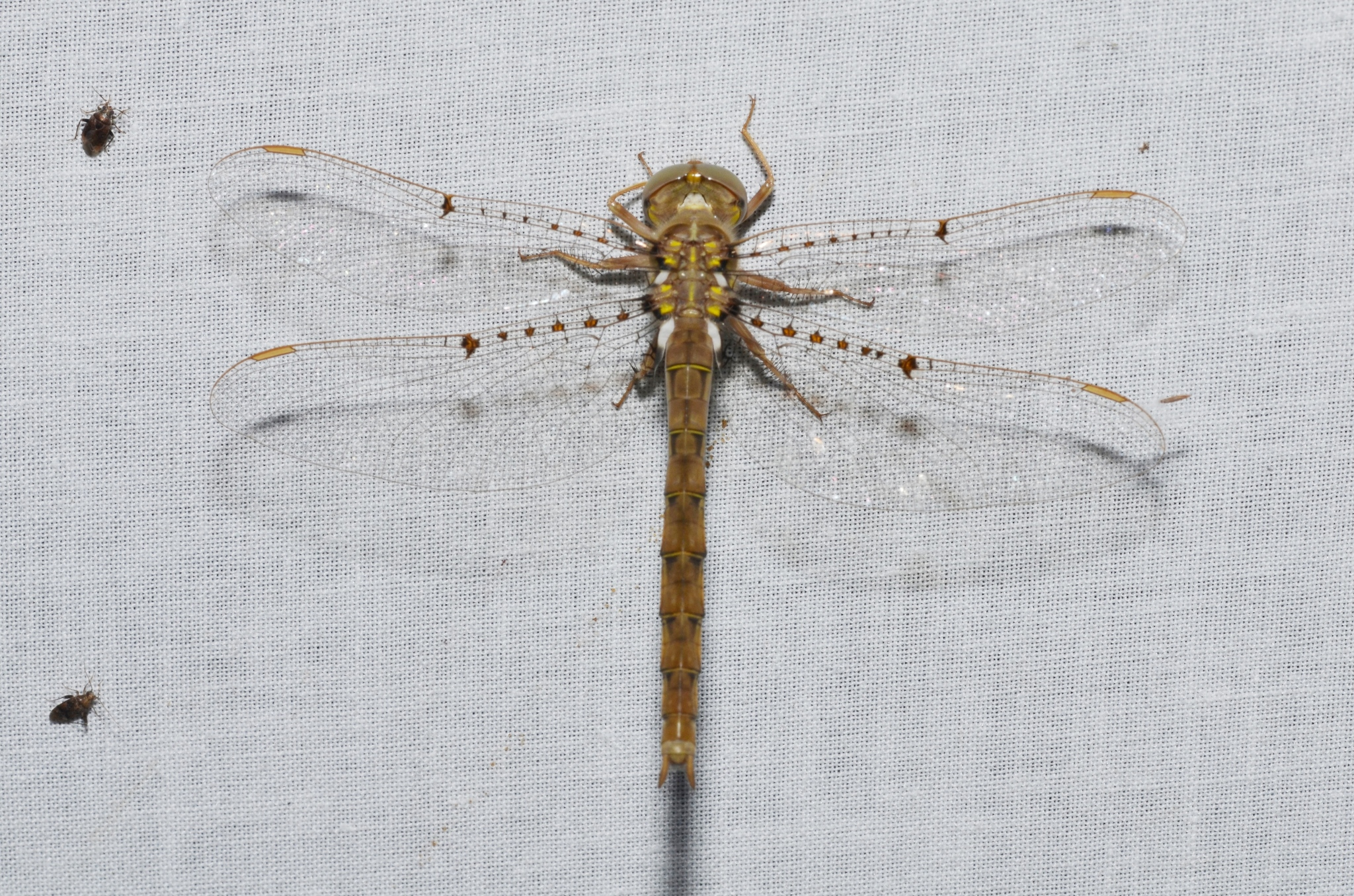

Conservation status
- Least Concern (IUCN 3.1)

Scientific classification
- Kingdom: Animalia
- Phylum: Arthropoda
- Class: Insecta
- Order: Odonata
- Infraorder: Anisoptera
- Family: Corduliidae
- Genus: Neurocordulia
- Species: N. molesta

Binomial name
- Neurocordulia molesta (Walsh, 1863)

Synonyms
- Neurocordulia clara Muttkowski, 1910

= Neurocordulia molesta =

Species of dragonfly

Neurocordulia molesta, known generally as the smoky shadowdragon or Apalachicola shadowfly, is a species of emerald dragonfly in the family Corduliidae. It is found in North America.

The IUCN conservation status of Neurocordulia molesta is "LC", least concern, with no immediate threat to the species' survival.
