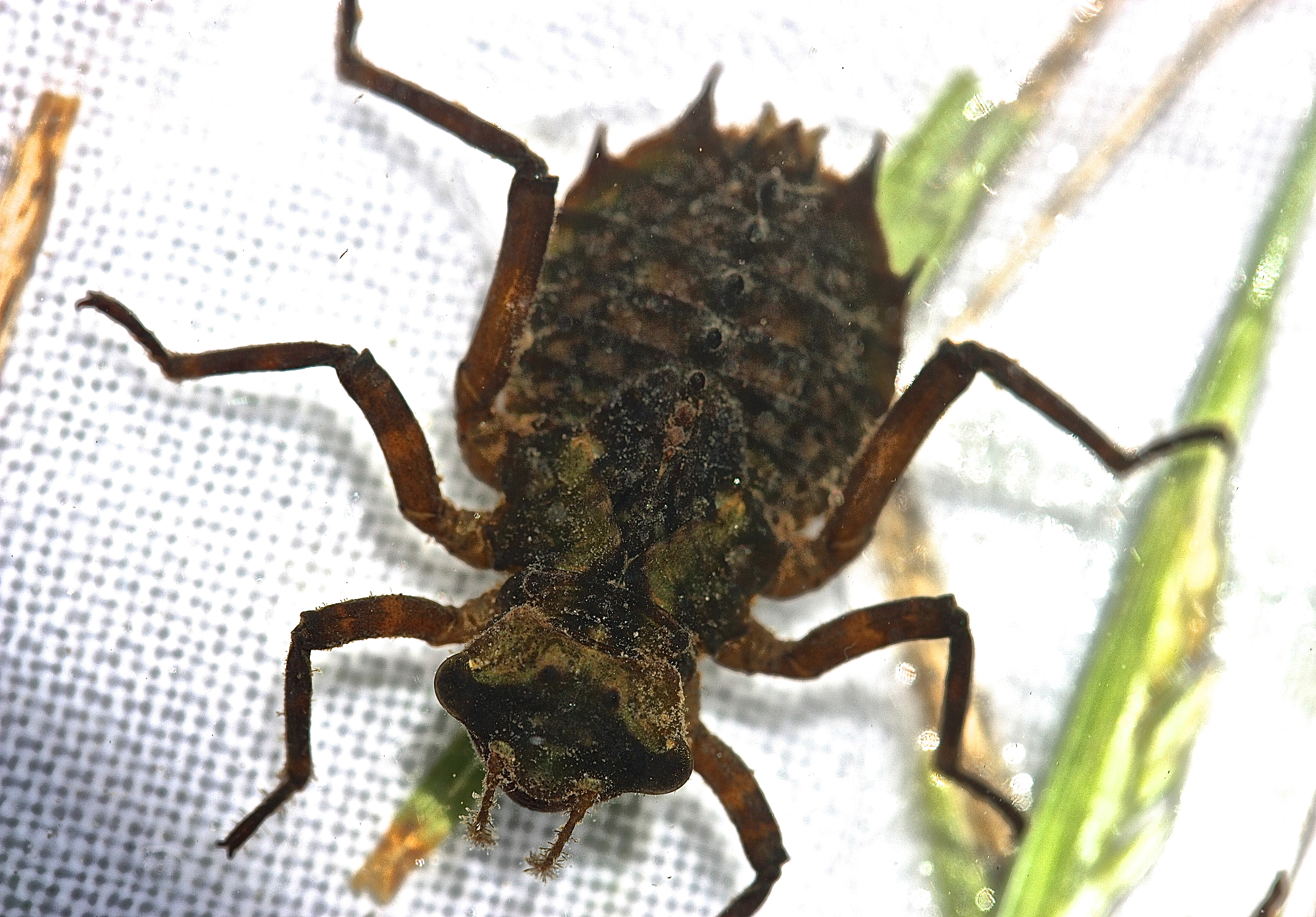

Conservation status
- Least Concern (IUCN 3.1)

Scientific classification
- Kingdom: Animalia
- Phylum: Arthropoda
- Class: Insecta
- Order: Odonata
- Infraorder: Anisoptera
- Family: Corduliidae
- Genus: Neurocordulia
- Species: N. obsoleta

Binomial name
- Neurocordulia obsoleta (Say, 1839)

= Neurocordulia obsoleta =

Species of dragonfly

Neurocordulia obsoleta, the umber shadowdragon, is a species of emerald dragonfly in the family Corduliidae. It is found in North America.

The IUCN conservation status of Neurocordulia obsoleta is "LC", least concern, with no immediate threat to the species' survival. The population is stable. The IUCN status was reviewed in 2017.
