= Charles-Eusèbe Dionne =

Canadian scientist (1846–1925)

- Born: 20 July 1846; Saint-Denis-de-la-Bouteillerie, Canada East
- Died: 25 January 1925 (aged 78); Quebec City
- Known for: Books on mammals and birds of Quebec, talented taxidermist
- Awards: Honorary M.A. and D.Sc., elective fellow of the AOU
- Scientific career
- Fields: Natural history, taxidermy
- Workplaces: Université Laval

Charles-Eusèbe Dionne (20 July 1846 – 25 January 1925), also known as Charles Eusebe or C. E. Dionne, was a French Canadian naturalist and taxidermist. He is considered the first professional French Canadian ornithologist. Dionne was a self-taught scientist and wrote several books on the natural history of Quebec, including the first field guide to the province's mammal fauna; he was a well-respected scholar and became a fellow of the American Ornithologists' Union.

== Biography ==
Dionne was born in 1846 to a modest rural family in Saint-Denis-de-la-Bouteillerie, near Kamouraska, the eldest of six boys and five girls born to Eusèbe Dionne and Amélie Lavoie. His father was a cobbler and farmer but the couple attached considerable importance to education, and Charles-Eusèbe displayed a thirst for knowledge from a young age, which was first noticed by his aunt Philomène. Philomène Dionne was the first to notice his affinity for natural history. Dionne captured and stuffed his first specimen at 14. After he had completed his elementary study, Philomène was the one who paid so he could benefit from private classes, where he came across a natural history book, an incident he would delight in recount in his later years, even though he could not remember the title.

=== At Laval ===
Dionne travelled to Quebec City in 1865 and, with the help of his cousin Zéphirin, who worked there, found work at the Séminaire de Québec. His predisposition was rapidly noticed and, having benefited from personal teaching sessions with Thomas-Étienne Hamel, he was promoted from cook to a position at Université Laval's (then administrated by the seminary) faculty of law. He became friend with historian and librarian Charles-Honoré Laverdière, and acquired from him scholarly techniques and instinct, all the while developing his knowledge and becoming an admirer of Léon Abel Provancher. He truly began to develop his natural history collections at that time. Unfortunately, his first attempts were of poor quality. It is possible that he acquired the basis for the techniques that would make his later fame from William Couper, a naturalist that resided in Quebec City during that period.

His knowledge in the various fields of natural sciences grew steadily thanks to the studies he did of his specimens, and the volumes he accessed through the university's library. He also followed classes at Laval and the Académie Commerciale of the Brothers of the Christian Schools. Having acquired knowledge of Latin and English, he could access a further wealth of knowledge. In 1873, Dionne was promoted deputy librarian to assist Laverdière, who couldn't keep up with the work. Laverdière died soon after and Dionne mourned a fellow academic and friend.

=== Marriage and the zoological museum ===
Dionne prowled the public markets for specimens, and attracted for himself the nickname of "Dionne l'empailleur" ("Dionne the stuffer"). He came to meet a fellow countryman, Guillaume-Wilfrid Pelletier, brother of his future wife Marie-Émélie, which he married on May 6, 1879; the couple had no children. The couple settled in an apartment on the second flour of Guillaume-Wilfrid's grocery. Dionne would gain further fame by regularly exposing his beautiful pieces in the front window of the store over the following decade. Pelletier, in return for the visibility, helped Dionne in his acquisitions. He died in July 1908.

Dionne's major interests over the course of his career were ornithology, entomology and taxidermy, although he wrote little about entomology. His renowned skills and amiable predisposition made him a prime candidate to become assistant-curator to François-Xavier Bélanger at Laval's zoological museum. He was possibly more competent on the whole than Bélanger, though the later had dedicated his later life to the museum. In 1882, upon the death of the curator, Dionne was appointed in his place. He would help turn the collection into one of the finest in the province. That same year Dionne published his Les oiseaux du Canada and traveled in the Gulf of Saint Lawrence with J.-U. Gregory, of the Quebec City Marine Bureau, with the aim of helping build ichthyological collections, for which Gregory would thank him. Dionne would refer several times to this expedition in his book. By 1887, his personal entomological collections had grown to over 1,500 specimens; the museum's counted over 16,000 of insects and animals. Dionne talented taxidermy was again noticed when he exposed nearly four hundred specimens at the 1887 provincial fair, where he collected two prizes. That collection, or most of it, would be acquired by Dominique-Napoléon Saint-Cyr in 1889 and form the basis of the zoological collections of the Musée de l'Instruction Publique (now part of the Musée de la Civilisation collection). Dionne subsequently remained the main taxidermist for the museum under Saint-Cyr's successors, and it was curator Victor-Alphonse Huard who would later suggest his candidacy to the Royal Society.

=== Member of the American Ornithologists' Union ===
In 1889, Dionne completed and published (possibly having been spurred by a dispute with Newfoundland ornithologist Montague Chamberlain) a reorganization of his first book into a Catalogue des oiseaux de la Province de Québec avec des notes sur leur distribution géographique ("Catalogues of the birds of Quebec with notes on their distribution", generally referred as the Catalogue des oiseaux de la Province de Québec, or just Catalogue). The perceptive and up-to-date (it used the American Ornithologists' Union classification), if short on overall information, ouvrage garnered good reviews from specialists such as Elliott Coues and Charles Foster Batchelder. Future president of the Union Jonathan Dwight noticed a very recent and subtle publication of his being taken into account and visited Dionne in 1891 to check on it. Dionne turned out to be right, and the two men struck up a friendship. This friendship and the one Dionne struck with Ruthven Deane in 1893 when he was delegated by Laval to Chicago for the opening of the Field Museum of Natural History were instrumental to his election that year as fellow of the AOU.

In 1902, Laval granted him an honorary Master of Arts degree. Between 1903 and 1907 he edited, with the help of Walter-Fournier Venner, a journal that aimed to compete with the Huard-edited Naturaliste Canadien, the Observateur Naturaliste. He wrote most material in the journal under various pseudonyms or anonymously, and although it is likely Huard knew about some of these articles, he might have never known about others. Between 1912 and 1924 there were several attempts spearheaded by Huard to have Dionne elected to the Royal Society of Canada Academy of Science, but all failed. This has often been blamed on racism on the part of the primarily English-speaking scientific section (Huard at the time was the sole French-speaking member, Léon Abel Provancher and other scientists had been elected to the Academy of Arts and Humanities as writers to get around this problem), but a turn in recognition from the "learned amateurs" of the 19th century to the formal academics cannot be entirely discounted. Despite his large knowledge and numerous contacts, Dionne overall rarely travelled outside his home city, and even less frequently left the country, although he travelled to New York City in 1911 and toured Europe in 1912. In 1919 he was involved in the foundation of the Société Léon-Provancher d'Histoire Naturelle du Canada.

Dionne died of illness in Quebec City on 25 January 1925, a mere few days after Laval granted him an honorary Doctor of Science degree (he commented of it "They should have waited after my death."). He had had his right leg paralysed for some times after a nasty wound infection in 1919, and this was probably linked to his death.

== Written works ==
Dionne's first major publication was his 1882 Les oiseaux du Canada ("The Birds of Canada"), which he dedicated to Provancher. It replaced a smaller, mostly outdated book published in 1860 by James MacPherson Le Moine. Les oiseaux du Canada, while well received in the French community, received mixed reviews from English-language scholars, particularly Montague Chamberlain, who deplored "its utter worthlessness as an authentic work". The precise amount of personal jealousy (Chamberlain was preparing his own Catalogue of Canadian Birds) and scientific concern (Dionne's work only truly covered Quebec, and used the soon-to-be obsolete classification of Coues) is difficult to assess. Coues himself, according to Dionne, wrote to commend his work.

The year 1902 saw the publication of Les mammifères de la province de Québec ("The Mammals of the Province of Quebec"), which was a commercial success and the first comprehensive French-language books about mammals in the province. Les oiseaux de la province de Québec was his major work and came out in 1906, garnering praise from Quebec and abroad for being up-to-date and comprehensive. It premiered French terminology in Canada for ornithology and synthesised ornithological knowledge from a variety of sources, as well as providing consistent French names for all species. Dionne was particularly interested in geographical distribution of birds, and this was reflected in the book's excellent coverage of that topic, thanks to Dionne's extensive notes and collected observations. The book would remain the only one to cover the province's avifauna so extensively for a long time, and was one of the first, if not the first North American state-based such book. In 1910, a paper on the spiders of Quebec was published separately.

In addition to his books, Dionne published a number of papers in The Auk and the Naturaliste Canadien, as well as most material published in the three issues of his Observateur Naturaliste.

== Influence and legacy ==
Alongside figures like Léon Provancher and Marie-Victorin, Dionne was a driving force in making natural sciences, and particularly birds, of interest in a time when such research was not considered very important. His work was widely circulated in French Canada for years after his death. In 2005, QuébecOiseaux, the province's federation of ornithological groups, began issuing a yearly prize named after him. He had a reputation of openness and readiness to help amongst learned and laymen alike.

Provancher named one species of ichneumon after Dionne, Tryphon dionnei, now called Monoblastus dionnei. Dionne's taxidermy work was appreciated and widely distributed, and his observations are important in tracing trends in bird population evolutions over time, such as those of the passenger pigeon. It is possible that he prepared one of the last specimens of the species.
