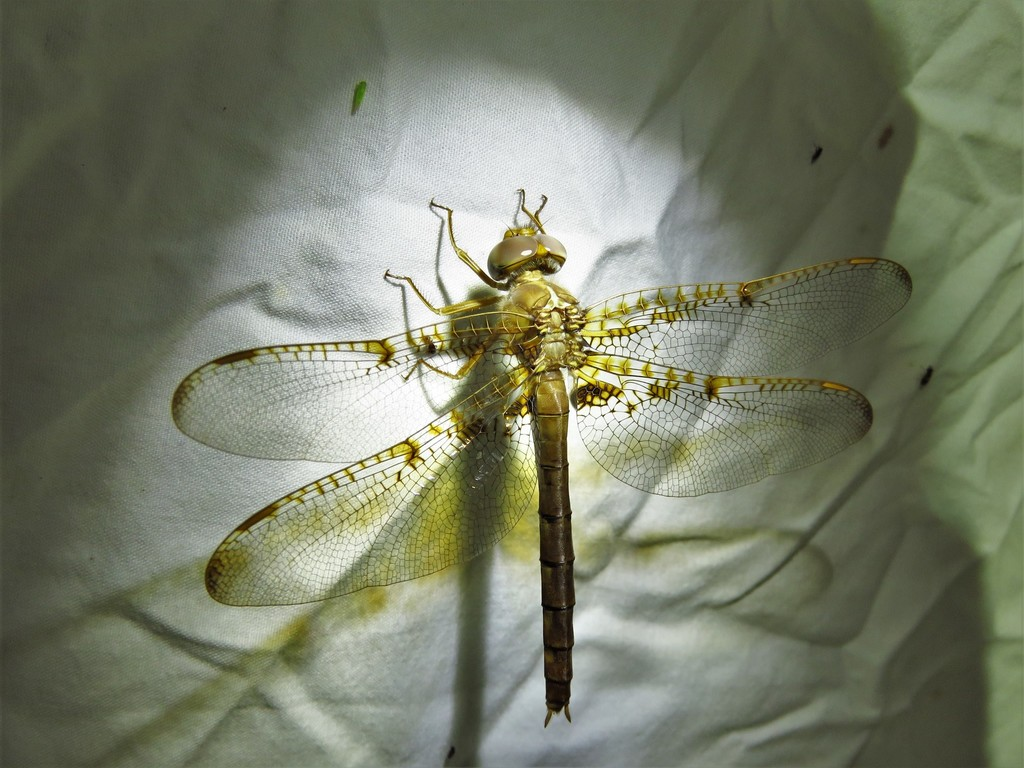

Conservation status
- Least Concern (IUCN 3.1)

Scientific classification
- Kingdom: Animalia
- Phylum: Arthropoda
- Class: Insecta
- Order: Odonata
- Infraorder: Anisoptera
- Family: Corduliidae
- Genus: Neurocordulia
- Species: N. xanthosoma

Binomial name
- Neurocordulia xanthosoma (Williamson, 1908)

Synonyms
- Platycordulia xanthosoma Williamson, 1908

= Neurocordulia xanthosoma =

Species of dragonfly

Neurocordulia xanthosoma, also called the orange shadowdragon, is a species of emerald dragonfly in the family Corduliidae. It is found in North America.

The IUCN conservation status of Neurocordulia xanthosoma is "LC", least concern, with no immediate threat to the species' survival. The population is stable.
