= Roland English =

Canadian politician

Roland Léo English

Member of Parliament for Gaspé
- In office June 1957 – April 1963

Personal details
- Born: 1 January 1909 Rivière-au-Renard, Quebec
- Died: 15 January 1993 (aged 84) Saint-Félix de Cap-Rouge, Quebec City, Quebec
- Party: Progressive Conservative
- Spouse(s): Yvonne DeMontigny m. July 1941
- Profession: Manufacturer, organizer, teacher

Roland Léo English (1 January 1909 – 15 January 1993) was a Progressive Conservative party member of the House of Commons of Canada. Born in Rivière-au-Renard, Quebec, he was a manufacturer, organizer and teacher by career. As an industrialist, he was president of Quebec Metal Products Company Ltd.

From 1928 to 1935, English was a professor at St. Roch Academy. In 1935, he was an unsuccessful candidate for a Quebec provincial legislature seat.

His first attempt at federal office was in the 1953 federal election where he was defeated by Liberal candidate Léopold Langlois at the Gaspé riding. He defeated Langlois in the 1957 election then was re-elected at Gaspé in the 1958 and 1962 federal elections. His House of Commons career ended in the 1963 election when he was defeated by Liberal candidate Alexandre Cyr.

English made one further attempt to return to Parliament in the 1965 federal election at the Matapédia—Matane riding, but was unsuccessful there.

From 18 November 1959 to 17 November 1961, English served as Parliamentary Secretary to the Minister of Fisheries then from 18 January to 19 April 1962, he was Parliamentary Secretary to the Minister of Fisheries.
