= Donald W. Thomas =

Donald "Don" William Thomas (July 1953 – May 30, 2009) was a Canadian university administrator and ecologist specialising in ecophysiology (particularly of bats). At the time of his death, he was dean of the Université de Sherbrooke faculty of science.

== Biography ==
Thomas grew up in Montreal and studied at Lower Canada College, before moving out of Quebec. He received his Bachelor of Science from the University of New Brunswick in Fredericton in 1975, his Master's from Carleton University studying animal ecology three years later, and his Ph.D. in tropical ecology from the University of Aberdeen in 1984. He briefly worked at the University of Washington before a Natural Sciences and Engineering Research Council (NSERC) fellowship brought him to Sherbrooke's department of Biology in 1985.

"When I arrived at Sherbrooke in 1992 as a young professor dropping in from Ontario, I was a bit worried: how well could I integrate and learn French? Don's example—and accent—were inspiring."

— Colleague Bill Shipley

At Sherbrooke he rapidly rose to the status of full professor, "a status usually awarded around mid-career", and in 2005 was named dean of the faculty of science. He had just been reappointed for a second term at the time of his death. A native speaker of English, Thomas never lost a strong accent, about which he was good-humored, and which never got in the way of clarity in his teaching. Although he studied an array of topics, his main subject of studies had long been bats, which were the subject of his Master's thesis, his Ph.D. dissertation, and his postdoc, and had attracted for him the nickname "Batman".

For a number of years Thomas had been traveling to Corsica to study blue tits; he died suddenly there from a stroke shortly after his arrival in May 2009. He had two sons with Marie-Hélène Poulin, a preschool-education teacher. The pair were in the habit of inviting colleagues and students to their home for friendly dinners after events such as seminars and dissertation defences.

== Research and legacy ==
"His honesty and direct criticism—though potentially shocking for the least confident ones—was very efficient in making scientific discussions productive. He was renowned for asking remarkably pertinent questions during departmental seminars and Ph.D. defences, even on subjects that were very far from his domain of expertise."

— Careau & Fenton (2009)

Thomas' primary research interest was the processes related to hibernation, such as torpor and energy use during the winter. He also worked, amongst other topics, on nutrient extraction and metabolism. One important contribution was the impact of small temperature changes on bodily need, which has served as the basis for studies and application such as the prediction of population response to environmental change. Another has been the contributions of water loss and energy expenditure during hibernation of bats to the understanding of white-nose syndrome.

During 24 years as a professor, he directed over twenty Master's and Doctorate students, received teaching awards from the university four years in a row from 1994 to 1998, and traveled across the world in search of answers as he studied bats and birds, but also rodents, crabs and turtles. He left a lasting impression, scientifically and personally, on those that knew him.

His scientific impact was marked by more than 20 book chapters and 100 papers, several of which were published in Science or Nature. He served as co-editor-in-chief of Écoscience for four years. He cowrote with his wife an elementary school science manual that earned a Roy C. Hill Award from the Canadian Teachers' Federation. After his death, a scholarship fund in his name was created at the Université de Sherbrooke, and the Society for Integrative and Comparative Biology acknowledged his influence by dedicating a symposium to him at its January 2011 annual meeting.

== Selected publications ==
- Thomas, Donald W. (1978). Aspects of the Social and Mating Behaviour of the Bat Myotis lucifugus (Chiroptera: vespertilionidae) at Hibernacula in Southern Ontario (M.Sc. thesis). Carleton University. 81p.
- Thomas, Donald W.; Fenton, M. Brock; Barclay, Robert M. R. (1979). "Social behavior of the little brown bat, Myotis lucifugus. I. Mating Behavior". Behavioral Ecology and Sociobiology. 6 (2): 129–136. doi:10.1007/BF00292559. S2CID 27019675.
- Thomas, Donald W.; Fenton, M. Brock; Barclay, Robert M. R. (1979). "Social behavior of the little brown bat, Myotis lucifugus. II. Vocal Communication". Behavioral Ecology and Sociobiology. 6 (2): 137–146. doi:10.1007/BF00292560. S2CID 21956215.
- Thomas, Donald W.; (1982). Ecology of an African Savanna Fruit Bat Community: Resource Partitioning and Role in Seed Dispersal (Ph.D. thesis). University of Aberdeen. 206p.
- Fenton, M. Brock; Thomas, Donald W. (1985). "Migrations and dispersal of bats (Chiroptera)". Contributions to Marine Science. 27: 409–424.
- Breton, L; Thomas, D.W.; Bergeron, J.-M. (1989). "Digestive tract characteristics for meadow voles (Microtus pennsylvanicus) fed diets containing phenols and tannins". Mammalia. 53 (4): 656–659.
- Thomas, Donald W.; Cloutier, Danielle (1992). "Evaporative Water Loss by Hibernating Little Brown Bats, Myotis lucifugus". Physiological Zoology. 65 (2): 443–456. doi:10.1086/physzool.65.2.30158262. S2CID 88223853.
- Picard, Karine; Thomas, Donald W.; Festa-Bianchet, Marco; Lanthier, Clément; Lanthier, Clement (1994). "Bovid Horns: An Important Site for Heat Loss during Winter?". Journal of Mammalogy. 75 (3): 710–713. doi:10.2307/1382520. JSTOR 1382520.
- Thomas, Donald W.; Brigham, R. Mark; Lapierre, Hélène (1996). "Field metabolic rates and body mass changes in common poorwills (Phalaenoptilus nuttallii: Caprimulgidae)". Écoscience. 3 (1): 70–74. doi:10.1080/11956860.1996.11682317.
- Humphries, Murray M.; Thomas, Donald W.; Speakman, John R. (2002). "Climate-mediated energetic constraints on the distribution of hibernating mammals" (PDF). Nature. 418 (6895): 313–316. Bibcode:2002Natur.418..313H. doi:10.1038/nature00828. PMID 12124621. S2CID 4335232. Archived from the original (PDF) on 2009-12-27.
- Thomas, DW; Blondel, J; Perret, P; Lambrechts, MM; Speakman, JR (March 2001). "Energetic and fitness costs of mismatching resource supply and demand in seasonally breeding birds". Science. 291 (5513): 2598–600. Bibcode:2001Sci...291.2598T. doi:10.1126/science.1057487. PMID 11283370. S2CID 42203332.
- Speakman, John R.; Thomas, Donald W. (2003). "Physiological ecology and energetics of bats". In Thomas H. Kunz & M. Brock Fenton. Ecology of Bats. Chicago: University of Chicago Press. pp. 430–490. ISBN 0-226-46207-2.
- Humphries, Murray M.; Thomas, Donald W.; Kramer, Donald L. (2003). "The role of energy availability in Mammalian hibernation: a cost-benefit approach" (PDF). Physiological and Biochemical Zoology. 76 (2): 165–179. doi:10.1086/367950. PMID 12794670. S2CID 14675451.
- Blondel, Donald W.; Charmantier, Anne; Perret, Philippe; et al. (2006). "A thirty year study of phenotypic and genetic variation of blue tits in Mediterranean habitat mosaics". BioScience. 56 (8): 661–673. doi:10.1641/0006-3568(2006)56[661:ATSOPA]2.0.CO;2.
- Careau, V.; Thomas, D.; Humphries, M. M.; Réale, D. (2008). "Energy metabolism and animal personality" (PDF). Oikos. 117 (5): 641–653. doi:10.1111/j.0030-1299.2008.16513.x. Archived from the original (PDF) on 2012-05-24.
- Dubois, Yohann; Blouin-Demers, Gabriel; Thomas, Don (2008). "Temperature selection in wood turtles (Glyptemys insculpta) and its implications for energetics". Écoscience. 15 (3): 398–406. doi:10.2980/15-3-3139. S2CID 86026143.
- Thomas, Donald W.; Bourgault, Patrice; Shipley, Bill; et al. (2010). "Context-dependent Changes in the Weighting of Environmental Cues That Initiate Breeding in a Temperate Passerine, the Corsican Blue Tit (Cyanistes caeruleus)". The Auk. 127 (1): 129–139. doi:10.1525/auk.2009.09141. S2CID 84558472.
