= Russell Keays =

Canadian politician

- Official 1966 portrait

Member of Parliament for Îles-de-la-Madeleine
- In office March 1958 – June 1962

Member of Parliament for Gaspé
- In office November 1965 – June 1968

Personal details
- Born: James Russell Keays; 30 October 1913 Newport, Quebec, Canada
- Died: 10 March 1995 (aged 81) Montreal, Quebec, Canada
- Party: Progressive Conservative
- Spouse(s): Sybil I. Miller m. 7 October 1939
- Profession: Industrialist, manufacturer

James Russell Keays (commonly known as Russell Keays) (30 October 1913 – 10 March 1995) was a Canadian industrialist and politician. He was a mayor in Quebec and later a Progressive Conservative party member of the House of Commons of Canada.

Born in Newport, Quebec, he attained a Bachelor of Arts at University of St. Joseph's College. In 1949, he became mayor of Gaspé, Quebec and held that post until at least 1960. He also founded La Cie de Bois de Baie Sud (South Bay Lumber) in the Gaspé region which today is known as KEGA.

He was first elected at the Îles-de-la-Madeleine riding in the 1958 general election. After a term in Parliament, Keays was defeated in the 1962 federal election at Îles-de-la-Madeleine by Maurice Sauvé of the Liberal party. In the 1965 election, Keays won the Gaspé riding and returned to Parliament, but was again defeated in the following election in 1968 by Alexandre Cyr of the Liberal party.

Keays did not seek any further re-election after that, but remained active within the Progressive Conservative party. He was part of a campaign team for Charles-Eugène Marin for the 1984 federal election. However, he and three other campaigners were fined for Canada Elections Act infractions in April 1986 for hiring scrutineers outside the purview of Marin's official agent.
