= Gaspé (federal electoral district) =

Former federal electoral district in Quebec, Canada

Quebec electoral district

Defunct federal electoral district
- Legislature: House of Commons
- District created: 1867
- District abolished: 1996
- First contested: 1867
- Last contested: 1993

Gaspé was a federal electoral district in Quebec, Canada, that was represented in the House of Commons of Canada from 1867 to 1997.

It was created by the British North America Act, 1867. It was amalgamated into the Gaspé—Bonaventure—Îles-de-la-Madeleine electoral district in 1996.

== Members of Parliament ==
This riding elected the following members of Parliament:

Parliament	Years	Member	Party
Gaspé
1st	1867–1872	Pierre-Étienne Fortin	Conservative
2nd	1872–1874	Pierre-Étienne Fortin	Conservative
3rd	1874–1875	Louis George Harper	Conservative
3rd	1875–1878	John Short	Conservative
4th	1878–1882	Pierre-Étienne Fortin	Conservative
5th	1882–1887	Pierre-Étienne Fortin	Conservative
6th	1887–1891	Louis-Zéphirin Joncas	Conservative
7th	1891–1896	Louis-Zéphirin Joncas	Conservative
8th	1896–1900	Rodolphe Lemieux	Liberal
9th	1900–1904	Rodolphe Lemieux	Liberal
9th	1904–1904	Rodolphe Lemieux	Liberal
10th	1904–1908	Rodolphe Lemieux	Liberal
11th	1908–1911	Rodolphe Lemieux	Liberal
12th	1911–1917	Louis-Philippe Gauthier	Conservative
13th	1917–1921	Rodolphe Lemieux	Opposition (Laurier Liberals)
14th	1921–1925	Rodolphe Lemieux	Liberal
15th	1925–1926	Rodolphe Lemieux	Liberal
16th	1926–1930	Rodolphe Lemieux	Liberal
17th	1930–1935	Maurice Brasset	Liberal
18th	1935–1940	Maurice Brasset	Liberal
19th	1940–1941	Joseph Sasseville Roy	Independent Conservative
19th	1941–1945	Joseph Sasseville Roy	Independent
20th	1945–1949	Léopold Langlois	Liberal
21st	1949–1953	Léopold Langlois	Liberal
22nd	1953–1957	Léopold Langlois	Liberal
23rd	1957–1958	Roland English	Progressive Conservative
24th	1958–1962	Roland English	Progressive Conservative
25th	1962–1963	Roland English	Progressive Conservative
26th	1963–1965	Alexandre Cyr	Liberal
27th	1965–1968	Russell Keays	Progressive Conservative
28th	1968–1972	Alexandre Cyr	Liberal
29th	1972–1974	Alexandre Cyr	Liberal
30th	1974–1979	Alexandre Cyr	Liberal
31st	1979–1980	Alexandre Cyr	Liberal
32nd	1980–1984	Alexandre Cyr	Liberal
33rd	1984–1988	Charles-Eugène Marin	Progressive Conservative
34th	1988–1993	Charles-Eugène Marin	Progressive Conservative
35th	1993–1997	Yvan Bernier	Bloc Québécois
Riding dissolved into Gaspé—Bonaventure—Îles-de-la-Madeleine

== Election results ==
1867 Canadian federal election: Gaspé
Party	Candidate	Votes
Conservative	Peter Fortin	acclaimed
Source: Canadian Elections Database

1872 Canadian federal election: Gaspé
Party	Candidate	Votes
Conservative	Pierre-Étienne Fortin	acclaimed
Source: Canadian Elections Database

1874 Canadian federal election: Gaspé
Party	Candidate	Votes
Conservative	Louis George Harper	545
Unknown	Horatio Le Boutillier	500
Source: lop.parl.ca

By-election on 10 July 1875 Harper unseated by petition, January 1875
Party	Candidate	Votes
Conservative	John Short	605
Unknown	Horatio Le Boutillier	299

1878 Canadian federal election: Gaspé
Party	Candidate	Votes
Conservative	Pierre-Étienne Fortin	913
Unknown	B. Lebouthillier	116

1882 Canadian federal election: Gaspé
Party	Candidate	Votes
Conservative	Pierre-Étienne Fortin	acclaimed

1887 Canadian federal election: Gaspé
Party	Candidate	Votes
Conservative	Louis-Zéphirin Joncas	1,219
Liberal	A.F. Carrier	1,145

1891 Canadian federal election: Gaspé
Party	Candidate	Votes
Conservative	Louis-Zéphirin Joncas	acclaimed

1896 Canadian federal election: Gaspé
Party	Candidate	Votes
Liberal	Rodolphe Lemieux	1,658
Conservative	Thos. Ennis	1,616

1900 Canadian federal election: Gaspé
Party	Candidate	Votes
Liberal	Rodolphe Lemieux	2,177
Conservative	Auguste Beaudry	815

1904 Canadian federal election: Gaspé
Party	Candidate	Votes
Liberal	Rodolphe Lemieux	acclaimed

1908 Canadian federal election: Gaspé
Party	Candidate	Votes
Liberal	Rodolphe Lemieux	2,063
Conservative	William Albert Edward Flynn	571

1911 Canadian federal election: Gaspé
Party	Candidate	Votes
Conservative	Louis-Philippe Gauthier	2,470
Liberal	Rodolphe Lemieux	1,900

1917 Canadian federal election: Gaspé
Party	Candidate	Votes
Opposition (Laurier Liberals)	Rodolphe Lemieux	5,438
Government (Unionist)	Louis-Philippe Gauthier	1,160

1921 Canadian federal election: Gaspé
Party	Candidate	Votes
Liberal	Rodolphe Lemieux	9,728
Conservative	Joseph Ernest Sirois	2,267

1925 Canadian federal election: Gaspé
Party	Candidate	Votes
Liberal	Rodolphe Lemieux	7,615
Conservative	Grattan O'Leary	3,528

1926 Canadian federal election: Gaspé
Party	Candidate	Votes
Liberal	Rodolphe Lemieux	8,769
Conservative	William Albert Edward Flynn	4,820

1930 Canadian federal election: Gaspé
Party	Candidate	Votes
Liberal	Maurice Brasset	9,784
Conservative	William Albert Edward Flynn	6,413
Source: lop.parl.ca

1935 Canadian federal election: Gaspé
Party	Candidate	Votes
Liberal	Maurice Brasset	11,773
Conservative	J.-Ernest Sirois	3,195
Reconstruction	Clovis Roy	2,657

1940 Canadian federal election: Gaspé
Party	Candidate	Votes
Independent Conservative	Joseph Sasseville Roy	8,371
Liberal	Maurice Brasset	8,162
Independent Liberal	Léopold Langlois	4,437

1945 Canadian federal election: Gaspé
Party	Candidate	Votes
Liberal	Léopold Langlois	11,596
Independent	J.-Sasseville Roy	10,473
Co-operative Commonwealth	Roland-Gérard Thibault	368

1949 Canadian federal election: Gaspé
Party	Candidate	Votes
Liberal	Léopold Langlois	12,567
Progressive Conservative	J.-Sasseville Roy	9,650

1953 Canadian federal election: Gaspé
Party	Candidate	Votes
Liberal	Léopold Langlois	12,058
Progressive Conservative	Roland-Léo English	10,832
Independent Liberal	Rose-Anne Lelièvre	199

1957 Canadian federal election: Gaspé
Party	Candidate	Votes
Progressive Conservative	Roland English	10,916
Liberal	Léopold Langlois	10,848
Independent	J.-Alfred Lévesque	504

1958 Canadian federal election: Gaspé
Party	Candidate	Votes
Progressive Conservative	Roland English	14,535
Liberal	Charles-Auguste Déry	9,994
Co-operative Commonwealth	Théo Gagné	282

1962 Canadian federal election: Gaspé
Party	Candidate	Votes
Progressive Conservative	Roland English	10,530
Liberal	Claude Bouchard	8,055
Social Credit	Régis Gagnon	5,067

1963 Canadian federal election: Gaspé
Party	Candidate	Votes
Liberal	Alexandre Cyr	10,738
Progressive Conservative	Roland English	8,846
Social Credit	J.-Albert Mignault	4,208

1965 Canadian federal election: Gaspé
Party	Candidate	Votes
Progressive Conservative	Russell Keays	11,045
Liberal	Alexandre Cyr	10,452
Ralliement créditiste	Louis-Joseph Roy	1,148

1968 Canadian federal election: Gaspé
Party	Candidate	Votes
Liberal	Alexandre Cyr	9,208
Progressive Conservative	Russell Keays	6,969
Ralliement créditiste	Jean-Guy Francoeur	3,571
New Democratic	Lawrence McBrearty	564

1972 Canadian federal election: Gaspé
Party	Candidate	Votes
Liberal	Alexandre Cyr	12,422
Progressive Conservative	J.-Bernard Savage	7,059
Social Credit	Claude Sasseville	2,970
New Democratic	Jean-Jacques Jauniault	643
Source: lop.parl.ca

1974 Canadian federal election: Gaspé
Party	Candidate	Votes
Liberal	Alexandre Cyr	12,213
Progressive Conservative	J. Bernard Savage	8,445
lop.parl.ca

1979 Canadian federal election: Gaspé
Party	Candidate	Votes
Liberal	Alexandre Cyr	14,830
Progressive Conservative	Paul Arsenault	11,797
Social Credit	Armand Preston	934
New Democratic	Jean Paul Rivard	783
Union populaire	Denise Imbeau	203

1980 Canadian federal election: Gaspé
Party	Candidate	Votes
Liberal	Alexandre Cyr	17,846
Progressive Conservative	Paul Arsenault	9,604
New Democratic	Yvon Pipon	1,018
Rhinoceros	Francis Vitesse Mainville	759
Independent	Lucien Boulay	255
lop.parl.ca

1984 Canadian federal election: Gaspé
Party	Candidate	Votes
Progressive Conservative	Charles-Eugène Marin	19,128
Liberal	Alexandre Cyr	10,215
New Democratic	Yvon Pipon	1,065
Parti nationaliste	Marie-Christine Dubreuil	697
Independent	Joseph-Marie Lévesque	317

1988 Canadian federal election: Gaspé
Party	Candidate	Votes
Progressive Conservative	Charles-Eugène Marin	16,298
Liberal	Delton Sams	9,908
New Democratic	Bertrand Réhel	1,504
Rhinoceros	Lucky Loque Francis Mainville	525
Independent	Yvon Dubé	185

1993 Canadian federal election: Gaspé
Party	Candidate	Votes
Bloc Québécois	Yvan Bernier	13,123
Liberal	Delton Sams	10,074
Progressive Conservative	Charles-Eugène Marin	5,424
Green	Michel Limoges	292
New Democratic	Eric Wilson Steedman	202

== See also ==
- List of Canadian electoral districts
- Historical federal electoral districts of Canada
