= Edward Short (judge) =

Canadian judge

Edward Short (June 10, 1806 – June 5, 1871) was a lawyer, judge and political figure in Quebec.

== Early life ==
He was born in Bristol, England, in 1806. He was the son of John Quirk Short, and the grandson of Robert Quirk Short. He emigrated to Canada, alongside his family.

== Career ==
He studied law in Trois-Rivières, and was called to the Bar of Quebec in 1826. He had practices in Montreal, Trois-Rivières and Quebec City, where he was a partner of Thomas Cushing Aylwin. He settled in Sherbrooke in 1830. He was appointed to the Court of the Sessions of the Peace in Saint-François district. He was elected to the 4th Parliament of the Province of Canada, representing the town of Sherbrooke in 1851. In November 1852, he was appointed a justice of the Quebec Superior Court, Saint-François district, and became a judge in the Seigneurial Court in 1854.

== Personal life ==
In 1839, he married Ann Brown. He died in Sherbrooke in 1871.

== Legacy ==
He is the namesake for “Short Street” in Sherbrooke.
