= Robert Quirk Short =

Robert Quirk Short (1759 – 31 January 1827) was a Church of England clergyman who emigrated to Canada in 1796. He was born at Withycombe Hall in Somerset, England.

== Legacy ==
His grandson was Edward Short
