= Louis George Harper =

Canadian politician (1830–1884)

Louis George Harper (February 28, 1830 – April 16, 1884) was a prothonotary and political figure in Quebec. He represented Gaspé in the House of Commons of Canada from 1874 to 1875 as a Conservative member.

He was born in Cap-Santé, Lower Canada, the son of George Harper and Marie-Anne Piché. He was admitted to the Lower Canada bar in 1855 and practised at Quebec City and then Percé. In 1858, he was named prothonotary in the Quebec Superior Court. His election in 1874 was overturned after an appeal and John Short won the by-election which followed in 1875. In 1876, he was named magistrate for Gaspé district. Harper died at Percé at the age of 54.
