= Charles-Eugène Marin =

Canadian politician

Member of Parliament for Gaspé
- In office 1984–1993
- Preceded by: Alexandre Cyr
- Succeeded by: Yvan Bernier

Personal details
- Born: 29 October 1925 Ste-Anne-des-Monts, Quebec
- Died: 7 June 2017 (aged 91) Ste-Anne-des-Monts, Quebec
- Party: Progressive Conservative
- Education: University of Montreal
- Profession: physician, psychiatrist

Charles-Eugène Marin (29 October 1925 – 7 June 2017) was a member of the House of Commons of Canada. Born in Ste-Anne-des-Monts, Quebec, he was a physician and psychiatrist by career.

He represented the Quebec riding of Gaspé where he was first elected in the 1984 federal election and re-elected in 1988, therefore becoming a member in the 33rd and 34th Canadian Parliaments. He was a member of the Progressive Conservative party.

In the 1993 federal election, Marin was defeated by Yvan Bernier of the Bloc Québécois and therefore left federal politics. He died at the age of 91 in 2017.
