= Écoscience =

- Discipline: Ecology
- Language: English, French
- Edited by: Hugo Asselin

Publication details
- History: 1994–present
- Publisher: Taylor & Francis (UK)
- Frequency: Quarterly
- Impact factor: 1.344 (2021)

Standard abbreviations
- ISO 4: Écoscience

Indexing
- ISSN: 1195-6860
- LCCN: 95641416
- OCLC no.: 60616632

Links
- Journal homepage

Écoscience is a quarterly peer-reviewed scientific journal originally published by Université Laval (1994–2014), and by Taylor & Francis since 2015. It was founded by Serge Payette, and it covers all aspects of ecology. In 2021 it had an impact factor of 1.344.
