= Sainte-Anne-des-Monts =

- City
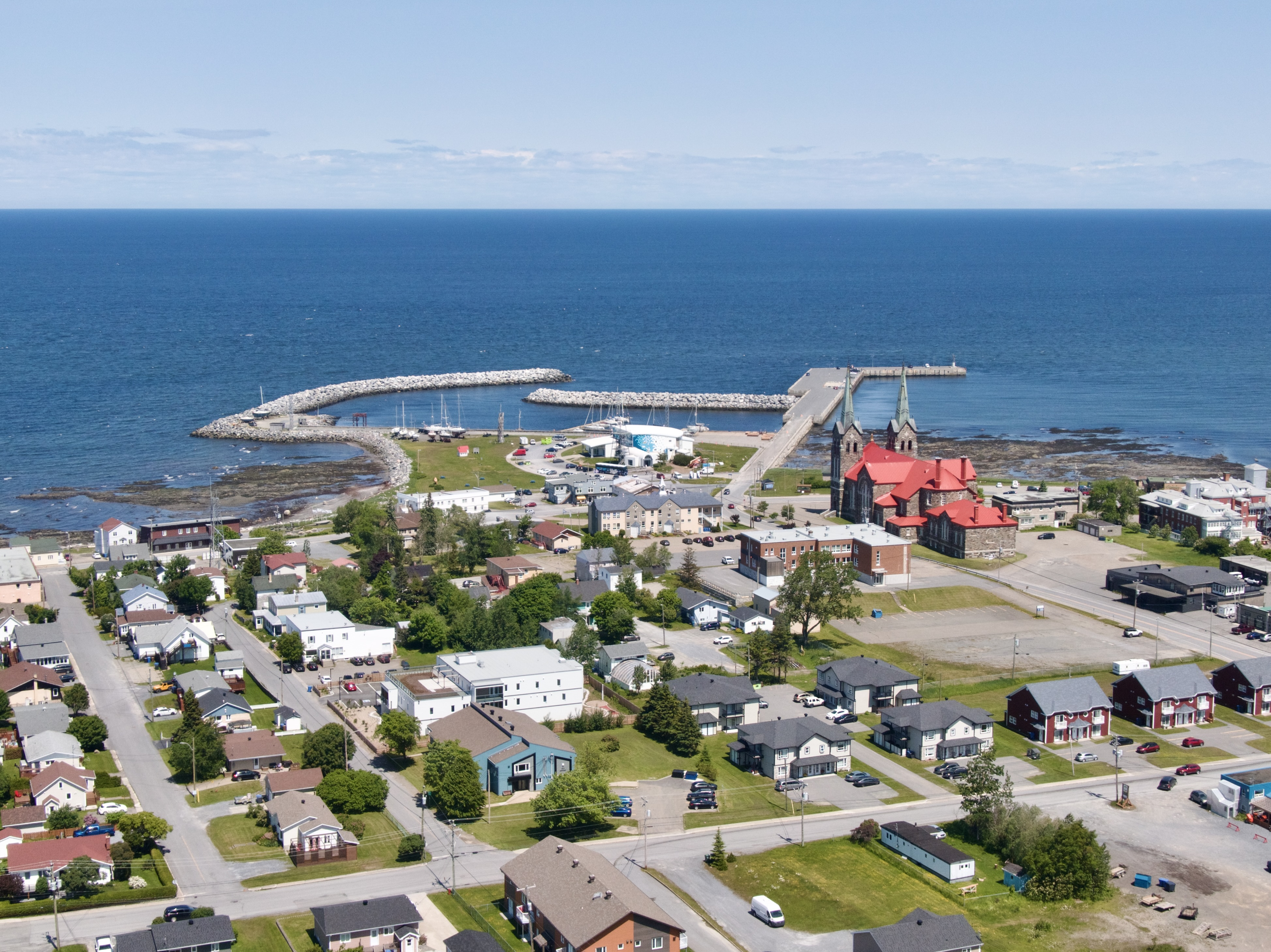
- Skyline of Ste-Anne-des-Monts, Quebec
- Motto: Per crucem ad lumen ("By the Cross Towards the Light")
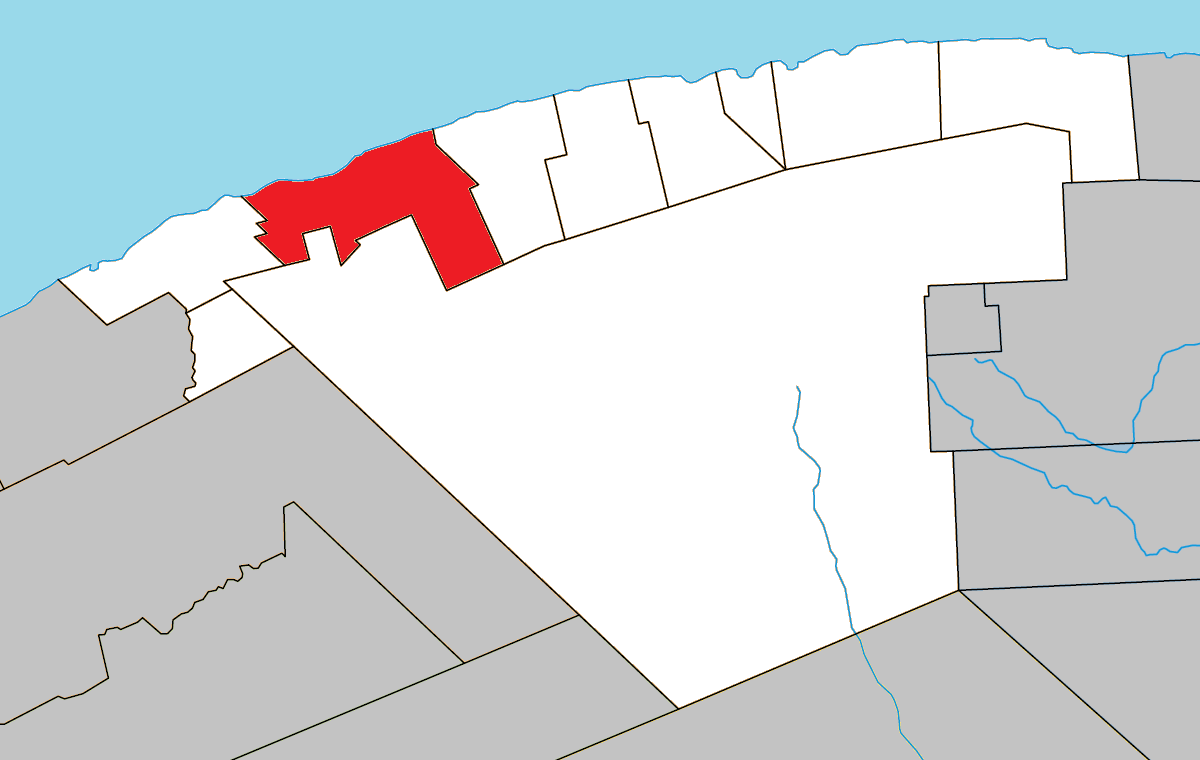
- Location within La Haute-Gaspésie RCM

- Location in eastern Quebec
- Coordinates: 49°08′N 66°30′W
- Country: Canada
- Province: Quebec
- Region: Gaspésie–Îles-de-la-Madeleine
- RCM: La Haute-Gaspésie
- Settled: 1815
- Constituted: February 2, 2000

Government
  - Mayor: Simon Deschênes
  - Federal riding: Gaspésie—Les Îles-de-la-Madeleine—Listuguj
  - Prov. riding: Gaspé

Area
  - Total: 336.40 km^{2} (129.88 sq mi)
  - Land: 263.51 km^{2} (101.74 sq mi)
- Elevation: 15.20 m (49.9 ft)

Population (2021)
  - Total: 6,121
  - Density: 23.2/km^{2} (60/sq mi)
  - Pop 2016-2021: ▼4.9%
  - Dwellings: 3,353
- Time zone: UTC−5 (EST)
  - Summer (DST): UTC−4 (EDT)
- Postal code(s): G4V
- Area codes: 418 and 581
- Highways: R-132 R-299
- Website: https://villesadm.net

Sainte-Anne-des-Monts, (French pronunciation: [sɛ̃t an de mɔ̃]) is a city in La-Haute-Gaspésie Regional County Municipality, Gaspésie–Îles-de-la-Madeleine region, Quebec province, in Canada.

Sainte-Anne-des-Monts is located close to the Chic-Choc Mountains on the south shore of Gulf of St Lawrence. In addition to Sainte-Anne-des-Monts itself, the municipality also encompasses the communities of L'Anse-de-l'Église, L'Anse-Sainte-Anne-des-Monts, Mont-Albert, Petit-Tourelle, Ruisseau-à-Patates, and Tourelle.

== History ==
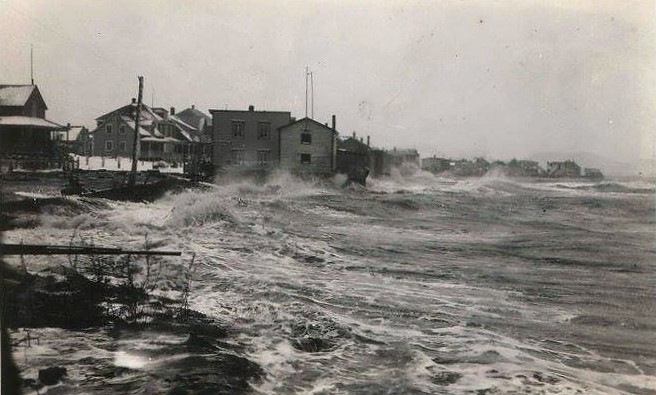
Tidal wave in Sainte-Anne-des-Monts on 23 December 1934

The name of Notre-Dame first appeared on schematic maps in 1709. The official nomenclature came from the seigneurie of Sainte-Anne-des-Monts, conceded to Denis Riverin in 1688. The first settlers arrived in 1815 and established small fisheries. The place was incorporated as a municipality in 1855. The city was a centre for pilgrimage at the beginning of the twentieth century. It was partially destroyed by fire in 1915.

In 1968, Sainte-Anne-des-Monts gained city status. On February 2, 2000, the City of Sainte-Anne-des-Monts and the Municipality of Tourelle were merged to form the new City of Sainte-Anne-des-Monts–Tourelle. It was given its current name on February 10, 2001.

== Climate ==
Climate data for Sainte-Anne-des-Monts (1981–2010 normals, extremes 1963–present)
Month	Jan	Feb	Mar	Apr	May	Jun	Jul	Aug	Sep	Oct	Nov	Dec	Year
Record high °C (°F)	15.0 (59.0)	15.0 (59.0)	17.0 (62.6)	27.0 (80.6)	28.0 (82.4)	33.3 (91.9)	31.1 (88.0)	31.7 (89.1)	33.0 (91.4)	26.1 (79.0)	20.5 (68.9)	16.1 (61.0)	33.3 (91.9)
Mean daily maximum °C (°F)	−7.4 (18.7)	−6.1 (21.0)	−0.9 (30.4)	5.3 (41.5)	12.1 (53.8)	17.9 (64.2)	20.7 (69.3)	19.8 (67.6)	15.3 (59.5)	9.4 (48.9)	2.6 (36.7)	−3.3 (26.1)	7.1 (44.8)
Daily mean °C (°F)	−11.6 (11.1)	−10.4 (13.3)	−5.0 (23.0)	1.7 (35.1)	7.7 (45.9)	13.3 (55.9)	16.5 (61.7)	15.7 (60.3)	11.4 (52.5)	5.8 (42.4)	−0.3 (31.5)	−6.7 (19.9)	3.2 (37.7)
Mean daily minimum °C (°F)	−15.8 (3.6)	−14.6 (5.7)	−9.0 (15.8)	−2.0 (28.4)	3.4 (38.1)	8.7 (47.7)	12.3 (54.1)	11.5 (52.7)	7.5 (45.5)	2.3 (36.1)	−3.2 (26.2)	−10.2 (13.6)	−0.8 (30.6)
Record low °C (°F)	−33.0 (−27.4)	−28.9 (−20.0)	−28.3 (−18.9)	−20.0 (−4.0)	−8.9 (16.0)	−1.7 (28.9)	2.2 (36.0)	1.1 (34.0)	−2.8 (27.0)	−11.1 (12.0)	−15.6 (3.9)	−27.2 (−17.0)	−33.0 (−27.4)
Average precipitation mm (inches)	61.5 (2.42)	44.6 (1.76)	59.2 (2.33)	53.6 (2.11)	74.3 (2.93)	79.6 (3.13)	92.2 (3.63)	81.3 (3.20)	78.0 (3.07)	91.9 (3.62)	81.4 (3.20)	66.3 (2.61)	863.9 (34.01)
Average rainfall mm (inches)	7.1 (0.28)	4.8 (0.19)	11.7 (0.46)	37.3 (1.47)	73.0 (2.87)	79.6 (3.13)	92.2 (3.63)	81.3 (3.20)	78.0 (3.07)	90.6 (3.57)	53.8 (2.12)	16.3 (0.64)	625.7 (24.63)
Average snowfall cm (inches)	54.9 (21.6)	39.8 (15.7)	47.6 (18.7)	17.7 (7.0)	1.3 (0.5)	0.0 (0.0)	0.0 (0.0)	0.0 (0.0)	0.0 (0.0)	1.3 (0.5)	27.6 (10.9)	49.9 (19.6)	240.1 (94.5)
Average precipitation days (≥ 0.2 mm)	18.1	13.8	13.2	12.9	14.7	13.1	14.9	14.3	13.6	15.0	14.9	16.9	175.4
Average rainy days	1.4	1.4	3.7	10.2	14.6	13.1	14.9	14.3	13.6	14.8	9.1	3.1	114.2
Average snowy days (≥ 0.2 cm)	17.4	12.8	10.8	4.4	0.5	0.0	0.0	0.0	0.0	0.4	7.6	14.9	68.8
Source: Environment Canada

== Demographics ==
In the 2021 Census of Population conducted by Statistics Canada, Sainte-Anne-des-Monts had a population of 6,121 living in 3,030 of its 3,353 total private dwellings, a change of −4.9% from its 2016 population of 6,437. With a land area of 263.51 km^{2} (101.74 sq mi), it had a population density of 23.2/km^{2} (60.2/sq mi) in 2021.

Canada census – Sainte-Anne-des-Monts community profile

	2021	2016	2011
Population	6,121 (-4.9% from 2016)	6,437 (-7.2% from 2011)	6,933 (+2.4% from 2006)
Land area	263.51 km^{2} (101.74 sq mi)	264.09 km^{2} (101.97 sq mi)	263.31 km^{2} (101.66 sq mi)
Population density	23.2/km^{2} (60/sq mi)	24.4/km^{2} (63/sq mi)	26.3/km^{2} (68/sq mi)
Median age	53.6 (M: 52.8, F: 54.0)	47.1 (M: 46.3, F: 47.8)	49.1 (M: 48.7, F: 49.4)
Private dwellings	3,353 (total) 3,030 (occupied)	3,307 (total)	3,323 (total)
Median household income	$54,400	$45,594	$38,770

Notes: City of Sainte-Anne-des-Monts and the Municipality of Tourelle merged on February 2, 2000.
References: 2021 2016 2011

Mother tongue:

- English as first language: 0.5%
- French as first language: 98.4%
- English and French as first language: 0.3%
- Other as first language: 0.7%

Historical Census Data - Sainte-Anne-des-Monts, Quebec
Year	Pop.	±%
2001	6,835	—
2006	6,772	−0.9%
2011	6,933	+2.4%
2016	6,437	−7.2%
2021	6,121	−4.9%
Source: Statistics Canada

== Economy ==
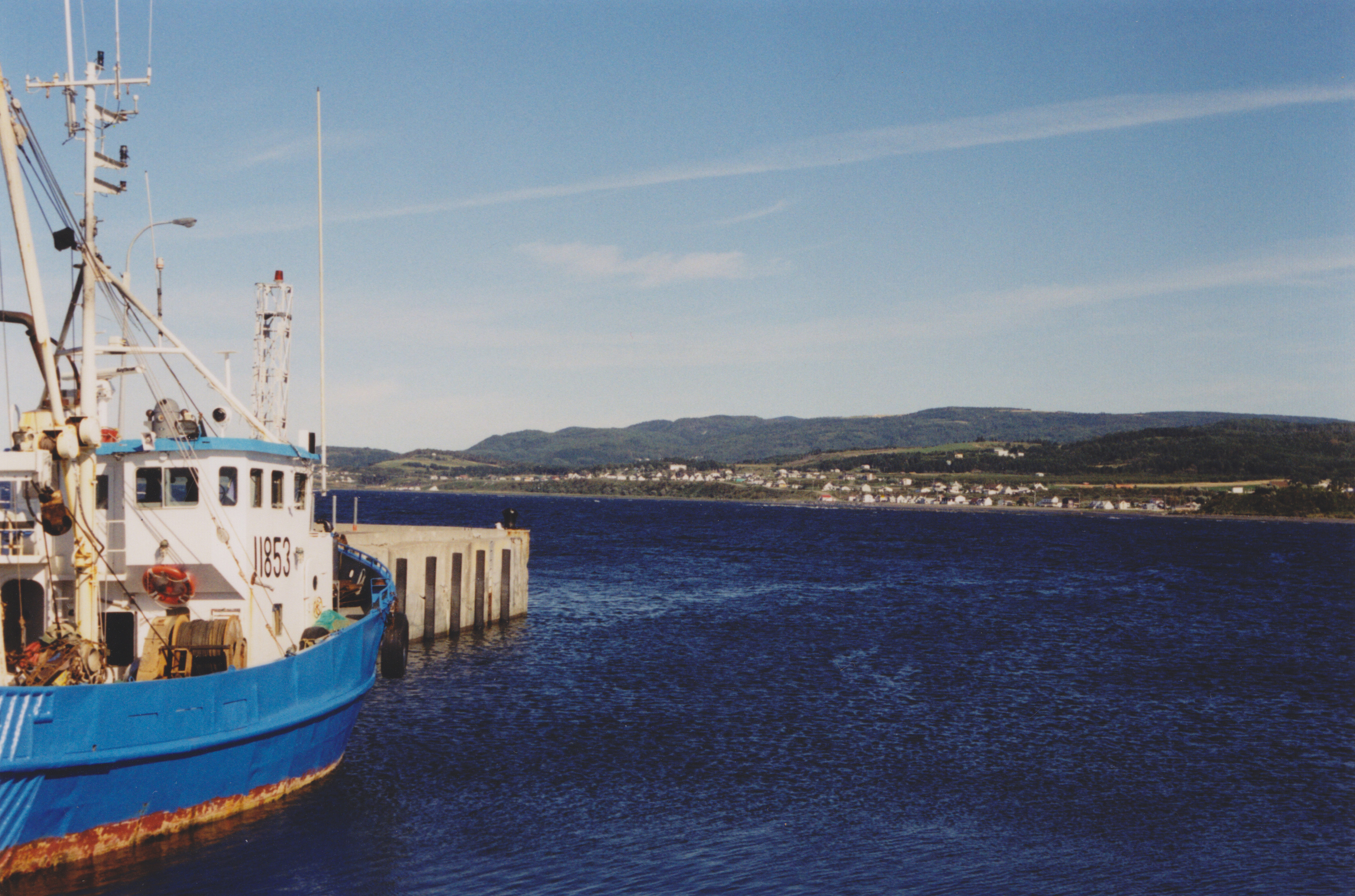
Crevettier Manic V, 11853, at the wharf on the Gulf of St. Lawrence

Tourism and fishing are the local industries. Exploramer is an activity complex on the Saint-Lawrence River aquatic fauna where you can see an aquarium offering 21 tanks which contain fish, marine organisms, a thematic exhibition about the sea, offshore excursions, and many more cultural events.

On the other side of the mountains, the National Park of Gaspésie provides access to the McGerrigle and Chic-Chocs mountains. They offer a panoramic photographic opportunity to admire the apex of Mont-Jacques-Cartier, the second highest summit in Québec.

== Attractions ==
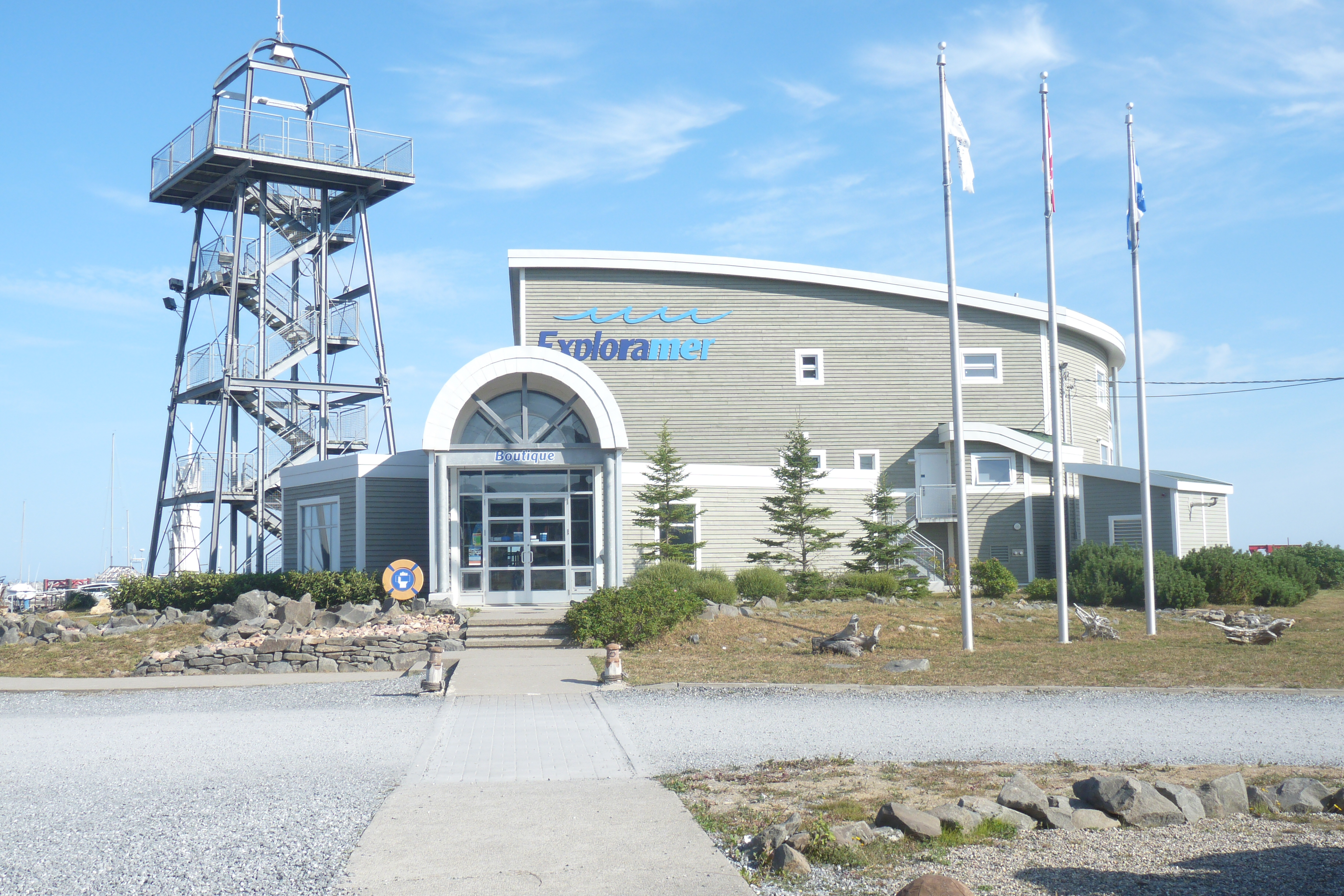
Exploramer Aquarium

Sainte-Anne-des-Monts is the access point to Gaspésie National Park and the Chic-Choc Mountains. A common activity is to explore the forest and mountains by snowshoe, snowmobile or walking.

This area is visited by natural sites enthusiasts, with cross-country skiing, Telemark skiing, walking, horse riding, paragliding, sea kayaking, fishing in the river and snowmobiling on marked trails around the Gaspésie area. Both moose and caribou (the last herd of the latter located south of the Saint Lawrence River) are found in the park.

A new activity appears in Gaspésie. Known as D'Arbre en Arbre (tree to tree), it is an adventure at the top of trees.

== Infrastructure ==
=== Transportation ===
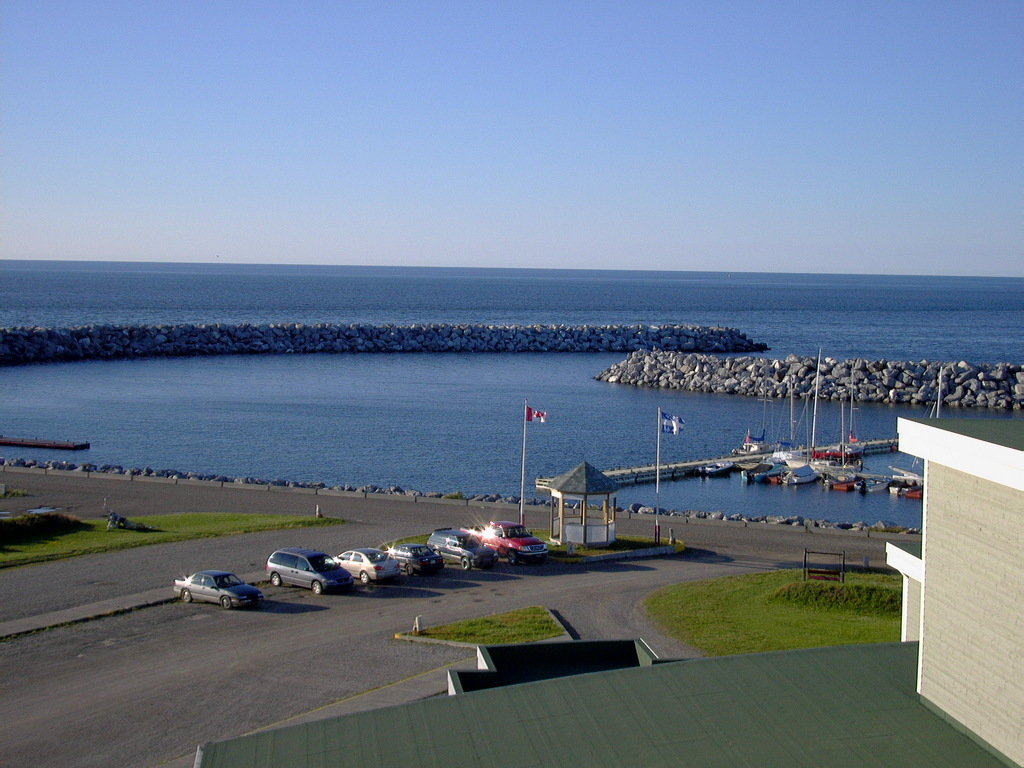
Sainte-Anne-des-Monts Marina

The municipality is located along Quebec Route 132, which follows the coast of the Gaspé Peninsula. Quebec Route 299, locally called the Park Route, links Sainte-Anne-des-Monts to New Richmond, by taking a smooth and yet outstanding panoramic route through the boroughs. The same route also provides access to the Gaspésie National Park.

The federal government manages a wharf with a pier for pleasure boats. The Sainte-Anne-des-Monts Aerodrome, with an asphalt runway, can be found on the outskirts of the municipality. Transport by rail is not available.

Sainte-Anne-des-Monts is the center of collective transportation and para-transit for the Haute-Gaspésie area.

=== Services ===
Because of its size, the municipality is a node for a scattered population. There is a hospital, a CLSC, a high school, a police station, a court house, a cultural centre including an auditorium, libraries and several government offices servicing the area with regard to fishing and fauna. A college (CÉGEP) is located in Matane, only 90 kilometres (56 mi) from Sainte-Anne-des-Monts. The municipality is the access point to the Parc de la Gaspésie.

== Notable people ==
- Thérèse Dion (1927–2020), public figure, businesswoman and television presenter, known for being the mother of singer Céline Dion
- Charles-Eugène Marin (1925–2017), physician, psychiatrist and politician
- Klô Pelgag (born in 1990), singer-songwriter

== See also ==
- List of cities in Quebec
