= Léon Abel Provancher =

Canadian Catholic parish priest and naturalist (1820-1892)

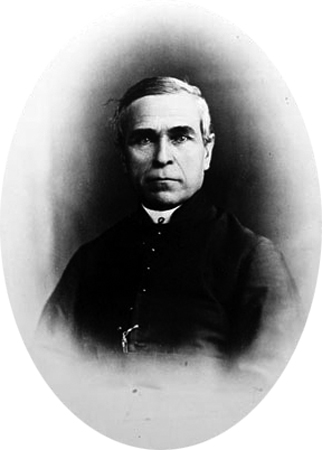
Léon Abel Provancher

Léon Abel Provancher (born 10 March 1820, in the parish of Bécancour, Nicolet County, Quebec; d. at Cap-Rouge, Quebec, 23 March 1892) was a Canadian Catholic parish priest and naturalist. He is called the "Father of Natural History in Canada".

== Life ==
Provancher studied at the college and seminary of Nicolet, and was ordained 12 September 1844. He organized two pilgrimages to Jerusalem, one of which he conducted in person. In 1865 he established in his parish at Portneuf a confraternity of the Third Order of St. Francis. He promoted the Third Order in his writings. For two years he edited a review, in which he published nearly every month an article on the Third Order, or answered questions appertaining thereto.

From childhood he had a special love for the study of nature and whatever time he could spare from his pastoral duties was devoted to the study and description of the fauna and flora of Canada. Provancher specialized in botany and entomology. He started in the art of grafting and began collecting shellfish. The Léon-Provancher collection of specimens and writings constitute the most complete and best preserved collections of North American naturalists of the nineteenth century.

== Works ==
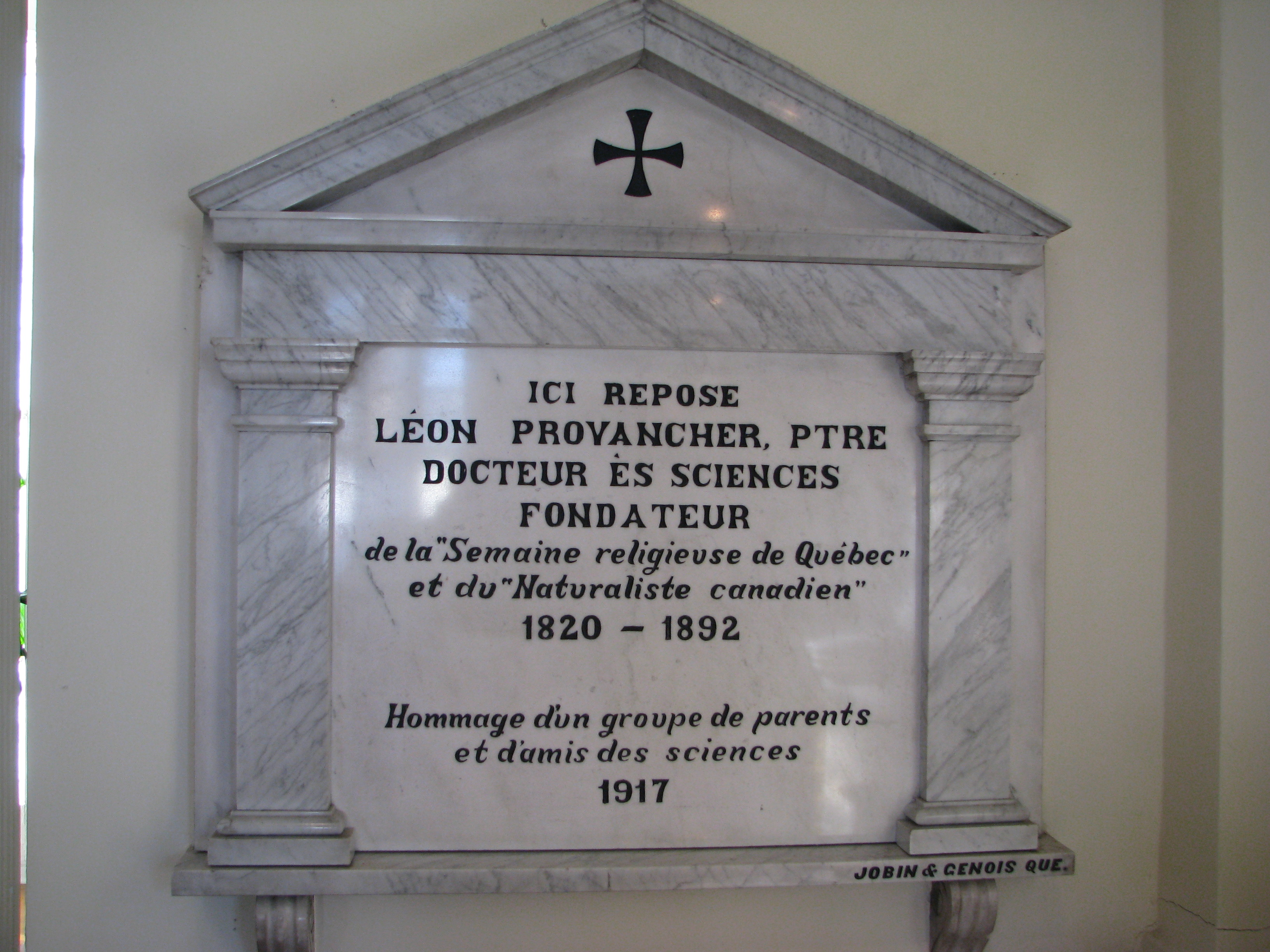
Funeral monument for Léon Provancher, Cap-Rouge

In 1868 he founded the Naturaliste Canadien, a monthly publication which he edited for twenty years, and from 1869 until his death he was engaged almost exclusively in scientific work.

Among his chief writings are:

- Traité élémentaire de Botanique (Quebec, 1858)
- Flore canadienne (2 vols., Quebec, 1862)
- Le Verger Canadien (Quebec, 1862)
- Le Verger, le Potager et le Parterre (Quebec, 1874)
- Faune entomologique du Canada (3 vols., 1877–90)
- De Québec à Jérusalem (1884)
- Une Excursion aux Climats tropicaux (1890)
- Les Mollusques de la Province de Québec

== See also ==
- List of Roman Catholic scientist-clerics
- Category:Taxa named by Léon Abel Provancher
