= Canadian federal election results in Eastern Quebec =

Seats obtained by party

Liberal
Conservative
New Democratic
Bloc Québécois
Social Credit (defunct)
Progressive Conservative (defunct)
Independents

Canadian federal elections have provided the following results in Eastern Quebec.

== Regional profile ==
Until 1984, this region of Quebec was Liberal territory. Social Credit also did well here, winning in Rimouski and in Bellechasse in 1979. Brian Mulroney, a native of this area, was able to sweep this region for the Conservatives in 1984 and 1988, using the strong nationalist sentiment in the area.

That nationalist support transferred to the Bloc Québécois, which dominated this region for the better part of two decades; the Liberals only won Montmagny in 1997 and the Bonaventure region in 1993. When the BQ experienced a decline in 2000, the Liberals were able to win in the Gaspé, and took Lévis in a by-election. When the Liberals collapsed in Quebec, the Bloc regained all their lost seats in 2004. One of those seats, however was lost to the Conservatives in 2006, and the Tories got another in a 2009. Hopes of further Bloc gains were dashed in 2011, as they were cut down to only one seat, with the NDP seizing one seat each from the Bloc and the Tories (the latter on a judicial recount).

Liberal support recovered strongly in 2015 allowing them to gain 2 seats, at the expense of the NDP, their first in the region since 2000. The Bloc was shut out as the Conservatives made a gain (on judicial recount) in Montmagny.

The Bloc reappeared in the region in 2019, picking up two seats from the Liberal. No seat exchanged hands in 2021, with all the outgoing MPs reelected. The only change was in Bellechasse where Dominique Vien, former provincial cabinet minister, succeeded Steven Blaney who was not seeking reelection.

=== Votes by party throughout time ===
Election	Liberal	Conservative	New Democratic	Green	People's	PC	Reform / Alliance	Bloc Québécois	Social Credit	Others
1979	131,716; 52.4%	—N/a	7,440; 3.0%	—N/a	—N/a	44,299; 17.6%	—N/a	—N/a	63,991; 25.4%	4,033; 1.6%
1980	154,909; 61.7%	—N/a	11,818; 4.7%	—N/a	—N/a	30,951; 12.3%	—N/a	—N/a	44,114; 17.6%	9,293; 3.7%
1984	92,772; 33.2%	—N/a	19,556; 7.0%	—N/a	—N/a	152,486; 54.5%	—N/a	—N/a	216; 0.1%	14,586; 5.2%
1988	75,824; 29.1%	—N/a	27,240; 10.5%	1,695; 0.7%	—N/a	153,222; 58.8%	—N/a	—N/a	445; 0.2%	2,112; 0.8%
1993	72,141; 26.7%	—N/a	3,359; 1.2%	291; 0.1%	—N/a	51,488; 19.1%	—N/a	139,786; 51.8%	—N/a	2,773; 1.0%
1997	82,949; 32.2%	—N/a	4,366; 1.7%	—N/a	—N/a	61,282; 23.8%	611; 0.2%	107,400; 41.7%	—N/a	857; 0.3%
2000	95,889; 39.5%	—N/a	4,320; 1.8%	—N/a	—N/a	9,846; 4.1%	16,793; 6.9%	114,659; 47.2%	—N/a	1,217; 0.5%
2004	58,181; 28.7%	21,518; 10.6%	7,889; 3.9%	5,987; 3.0%	—N/a	—N/a	—N/a	108,796; 53.7%	—N/a	163; 0.1%
2006	31,741; 14.4%	70,454; 32.0%	12,224; 5.6%	7,127; 3.2%	—N/a	—N/a	—N/a	93,543; 42.5%	—N/a	5,053; 2.3%
2008	44,110; 21.4%	59,746; 28.9%	16,414; 8.0%	5,268; 2.6%	—N/a	—N/a	—N/a	78,513; 38.0%	—N/a	2,401; 1.2%
2011	24,762; 11.2%	60,889; 27.6%	75,446; 34.1%	4,081; 1.8%	—N/a	—N/a	—N/a	55,760; 25.2%	—N/a	0; 0.0%
2015	69,280; 29.8%	54,135; 23.3%	60,033; 25.8%	4,289; 1.8%	—N/a	—N/a	—N/a	39,759; 17.1%	—N/a	5,264; 2.3%
2019	57,523; 24.5%	63,123; 26.9%	22,944; 9.8%	5,608; 2.4%	2,364; 1.0%	—N/a	—N/a	82,488; 35.1%	—N/a	900; 0.4%
2021	53,111; 23.8%	67,847; 30.4%	10,281; 4.6%	918; 0.4%	2,286; 1.0%	—N/a	—N/a	82,133; 36.8%	—N/a	6,489; 2.9%
2025	77,971; 32.9%	74,454; 31.4%	4,690; 2.0%	692; 0.3%	2,036; 0.9%	—N/a	—N/a	75,378; 31.8%	—N/a	2,031; 0.9%

Election statistics in Eastern Quebec

Liberal
Conservative
New Democratic
Bloc Québécois
Green
Social Credit (defunct)
Reform (defunct)
Alliance (defunct)
Progressive Conservative (defunct)

== Detailed results ==
=== 2019 ===
Electoral district	Candidates							Incumbent
Electoral district	Liberal	Conservative	BQ	NDP	Green	PPC	Other	Incumbent
Avignon—La Mitis—Matane—Matapédia	Rémi Massé; 12,188; 33.89%	Natasha Tremblay; 2,756; 7.66%	Kristina Michaud; 18,500; 51.43%	Rémi-Jocelyn Côté; 1,435; 3.99%	James Morrison; 699; 1.94%	Éric Barnabé; 210; 0.58%	Mathieu Castonguay (Rhino.); 180; 0.50%	Rémi Massé
Bellechasse—Les Etchemins—Lévis	Laurence Harvey; 10,734; 16.66%	Steven Blaney; 32,283; 50.09%	Sébastien Bouchard-Théberge; 14,754; 22.89%	Khuon Chamroeun; 3,256; 5.05%	André Voyer; 1,925; 2.99%	Marc Johnston; 1,307; 2.03%	Yves Gilbert (CHP); 188; 0.29%	Steven Blaney
Gaspésie—Les Îles-de-la-Madeleine	Diane Lebouthillier; 16,296; 42.46%	Jean-Pierre Pigeon; 3,022; 7.87%	Guy Bernatchez; 15,659; 40.80%	Lynn Beaulieu; 1,722; 4.49%	Dennis Drainville; 1,130; 2.94%	Eric Hébert; 198; 0.52%	Jay Cowboy (Rhino.); 353; 0.92%	Diane Lebouthillier
Montmagny—L'Islet—Kamouraska—Rivière-du-Loup	Aladin Legault d'Auteuil; 8,210; 16.29%	Bernard Généreux; 20,989; 41.65%	Louis Gagnon; 16,261; 32.27%	Hugo Latulippe; 3,481; 6.91%	Denis Ducharme; 1,030; 2.04%	Serge Haché; 417; 0.83%		Bernard Généreux
Rimouski-Neigette—Témiscouata—Les Basques	Chantal Pilon; 10,095; 22.06%	Nancy Brassard-Fortin; 4,073; 8.90%	Maxime Blanchette-Joncas; 17,314; 37.83%	Guy Caron; 13,050; 28.51%	Jocelyn Rioux; 824; 1.80%	Pierre Lacombe; 232; 0.51%	Lysane Picker-Paquin (Rhino.); 179; 0.39%	Guy Caron

- Note:

=== 2015 ===
Electoral district	Candidates							Incumbent
Electoral district	Conservative	NDP	Liberal	BQ	Green	Rhinoceros	Strength in Democracy	Incumbent
Avignon—La Mitis—Matane—Matapédia	André Savoie; 2,228; 6.13%	Joël Charest; 7,340; 20.19%	Rémi Massé; 14,378; 39.55%	Kédina Fleury-Samson; 7,641; 21.02%	Sherri Springle; 365; 1.00%	Éric Normand; 175; 0.48%	Jean-François Fortin; 4,229; 11.63%	Jean-François Fortin (Note: Elected as a Bloc MP in 2011, left the caucus to seat as an Independent MP in August 2014 and joined the Strength in Democracy caucus in October 2014.); Haute-Gaspésie—La Mitis—Matane—Matapédia
Bellechasse—Les Etchemins—Lévis	Steven Blaney; 31,872; 50.92%	Jean-Luc Daigle; 8,516; 13.60%	Jacques Turgeon; 12,961; 20.71%	Antoine Dubé; 7,217; 11.53%	André Bélisle; 2,032; 3.25%			Steven Blaney; Lévis—Bellechasse
Gaspésie—Les Îles-de-la-Madeleine	Jean-Pierre Pigeon; 2,398; 6.05%	Philip Toone; 12,885; 32.52%	Diane Lebouthillier; 15,345; 38.73%	Nicolas Roussy; 8,289; 20.92%	Jim Morrison; 400; 1.01%	Max Boudreau; 300; 0.76%		Philip Toone; Gaspésie—Îles-de-la-Madeleine
Montmagny—L'Islet—Kamouraska—Rivière-du-Loup (Note: Results after the judicial recount.)	Bernard Généreux; 14,274; 28.99%	François Lapointe; 11,918; 24.20%	Marie-Josée Normand; 14,002; 28.43%	Louis Gagnon; 7,939; 16.12%	Chantal Breton; 823; 1.67%	Bien Gras Gagné; 287; 0.58%		François Lapointe
Rimouski-Neigette—Témiscouata—Les Basques	Francis Fortin; 3,363; 7.48%	Guy Caron; 19,374; 43.11%	Pierre Cadieux; 12,594; 28.02%	Johanne Carignan; 8,673; 19.30%	Louise Boutin; 669; 1.49%	Sébastien CôRhino Côrriveau; 273; 0.61%		Guy Caron

=== 2011 ===
Electoral district	Candidates					Incumbent
Electoral district	BQ	Conservative	Liberal	NDP	Green	Incumbent
Gaspésie—Îles-de-la-Madeleine	Daniel Côté; 11,650; 31.64%	Régent Bastien; 6,292; 17.09%	Jules Duguay; 5,533; 15.03%	Philip Toone; 12,427; 33.76%	Julien Leblanc; 913; 2.48%	Raynald Blais†
Haute-Gaspésie—La Mitis—Matane—Matapédia	Jean-François Fortin; 12,633; 36.05%	Allen Cormier; 5,253; 14.99%	Nancy Charest; 8,964; 25.58%	Joanie Boulet; 7,484; 21.36%	Louis Drainville; 707; 2.02%	Vacant (Note: Seat left vacant after Bloc MP Jean-Yves Roy resigned in October 2010.)
Lévis—Bellechasse	Danielle-Maude Gosselin; 8,757; 14.89%	Steven Blaney; 25,850; 43.95%	Francis Laforesterie; 3,421; 5.82%	Nicole Laliberté; 19,890; 33.81%	Sacha Douge; 903; 1.54%	Steven Blaney
Montmagny—L'Islet—Kamouraska—Rivière-du-Loup	Nathalie Arsenault; 9,550; 20.09%	Bernard Généreux; 17,276; 36.34%	Andrew Caddell; 2,743; 5.77%	François Lapointe; 17,285; 36.36%	Lynette Tremblay; 691; 1.45%	Bernard Généreux
Rimouski-Neigette—Témiscouata—Les Basques	Claude Guimond; 13,170; 30.83%	Bertin Denis; 6,218; 14.56%	Pierre Cadieux; 4,101; 9.60%	Guy Caron; 18,360; 42.98%	Clément Pelletier; 867; 2.03%	Claude Guimond

=== 2008 ===
Electoral district	Candidates						Incumbent
Electoral district	BQ	Conservative	Liberal	NDP	Green	Other	Incumbent
Gaspésie—Îles-de-la-Madeleine	Raynald Blais; 14,636; 40.10%	Darryl Gray; 8,334; 22.84%	Denis Gauvreau; 9,840; 26.96%	Gaston Langlais; 2,549; 6.98%	Julien Leblanc; 1,136; 3.11%		Raynald Blais
Haute-Gaspésie—La Mitis—Matane—Matapédia	Jean-Yves Roy; 11,984; 37.53%	Jérôme Landry; 5,771; 18.07%	Nancy Charest; 11,368; 35.60%	Julie Demers; 1,497; 4.69%	Louis Drainville; 1,139; 3.57%	Liliane Potvin (Ind.); 175; 0.55%	Jean-Yves Roy
Lévis—Bellechasse	Guy Bergeron; 13,747; 25.46%	Steven Blaney; 24,785; 45.90%	Pauline Côté; 8,130; 15.06%	Gabriel Biron; 5,856; 10.84%	Lynne Champoux-Williams; 1,370; 2.54%	Normand Fournier (M-L); 113; 0.21%	Steven Blaney
Montmagny—L'Islet—Kamouraska—Rivière-du-Loup	Paul Crête; 20,494; 46.03%	Denis Laflamme; 13,640; 30.64%	Jean Bouchard; 6,835; 15.35%	Gaston Hervieux; 2,428; 5.45%	Claude Gaumond; 978; 2.20%	Aubert Côté (CHP); 147; 0.33%	Paul Crête
Rimouski-Neigette—Témiscouata—Les Basques	Claude Guimond; 17,652; 44.69%	Gaston Noël; 7,216; 18.27%	Pierre Béland; 7,937; 20.09%	Guy Caron; 4,084; 10.34%	James D. Morrison; 645; 1.63%	Louise Thibault (Ind.); 1,966; 4.98%	Louise Thibault (Note: Left the Bloc québécois caucus in 2007 and sat as an Independent MP.)

=== 2006 ===
Electoral district	Candidates						Incumbent
Electoral district	BQ	Liberal	Conservative	NDP	Green	Independent	Incumbent
Gaspésie—Îles-de-la-Madeleine	Raynald Blais; 17,678; 42.69%	Mario Lévesque; 7,977; 19.26%	Gaston Langlais; 13,347; 32.23%	Sylvie Dauphinais; 1,225; 2.96%	Bob Eichenberger; 1,183; 2.86%		Raynald Blais
Haute-Gaspésie—La Mitis—Matane—Matapédia	Jean-Yves Roy; 15,721; 46.04%	Kim Leclerc; 4,463; 13.07%	Rodrigue Drapeau; 10,157; 29.75%	Stéphane Ricard; 2,116; 6.20%	Sarah Desjardins; 910; 2.67%	Yvan Côté; 778; 2.28%	Jean-Yves Roy
Lévis—Bellechasse	Réal Lapierre; 16,223; 29.02%	Shirley Baril; 4,581; 8.19%	Steven Blaney; 25,940; 46.40%	Eric Boucher; 2,590; 4.63%	Mathieu Castonguay; 2,293; 4.10%	Normand Cadrin; 4,275; 7.65%	Réal Lapierre
Montmagny—L'Islet—Kamouraska—Rivière-du-Loup	Paul Crête; 24,117; 52.44%	Lise M. Vachon; 6,466; 14.06%	Daniel Nadeau; 11,529; 25.07%	Myriam Leblanc; 2,107; 4.58%	Serge Lemay; 1,768; 3.84%		Paul Crête
Rimouski-Neigette—Témiscouata—Les Basques	Louise Thibault; 19,804; 46.38%	Michel Tremblay; 8,254; 19.33%	Roger Picard; 9,481; 22.20%	Guy Caron; 4,186; 9.80%	François Bédard; 973; 2.28%		Louise Thibault

=== 2004 ===
Electoral district	Candidates						Incumbent
Electoral district	Liberal	BQ	Conservative	NDP	Green	Communist	Incumbent
Gaspésie—Îles-de-la-Madeleine	Georges Farrah; 12,579; 32.65%	Raynald Blais; 21,446; 55.67%	Guy De Coste; 2,636; 6.84%	Philip Toone; 805; 2.09%	Bob Eichenberger; 1,060; 2.75%		Georges Farrah; Bonaventure—Gaspé—Îles-de-la-Madeleine—Pabok
Lévis—Bellechasse	Christian Jobin; 13,664; 27.62%	Réal Lapierre; 21,930; 44.34%	Gilles Vézina; 9,425; 19.05%	Louise Foisy; 1,910; 3.86%	Sylvain Castonguay; 2,372; 4.80%	Christophe Vaillancourt; 163; 0.33%	Christian Jobin (Note: Elected in a 2003 byelection after Antoine Dubé resigned to seek a seat in the National Assembly of Quebec.); Lévis-et-Chutes-de-la-Chaudière
Matapédia—Matane	Marc Bélanger; 9,653; 30.48%	Jean-Yves Roy; 17,878; 56.45%	Vahid Fortin-Vidah; 1,972; 6.23%	Jean-Guy Côté; 1,581; 4.99%	Nicolas Deville; 585; 1.85%		Jean-Yves Roy
Rimouski-Neigette—Témiscouata—Les Basques	Côme Roy; 9,161; 23.77%	Louise Thibault; 22,215; 57.63%	Denis Quimper; 3,445; 8.94%	Guy Caron; 2,717; 7.05%	Marjolaine Delaunière; 1,008; 2.62%		Suzanne Tremblay†; Rimouski—Neigette-et-La-Mitis
Rivière-du-Loup—Montmagny	Isabelle Mignault; 13,124; 29.61%	Paul Crête; 25,327; 57.13%	Marc-André Drolet; 4,040; 9.11%	Frédérick Garon; 876; 1.98%	André Clermont; 962; 2.17%		Paul Crête; Kamouraska—Rivière-du-Loup—Témiscouata—Les Basques
Rivière-du-Loup—Montmagny	Isabelle Mignault; 13,124; 29.61%	Paul Crête; 25,327; 57.13%	Marc-André Drolet; 4,040; 9.11%	Frédérick Garon; 876; 1.98%	André Clermont; 962; 2.17%		merged district
Rivière-du-Loup—Montmagny	Isabelle Mignault; 13,124; 29.61%	Paul Crête; 25,327; 57.13%	Marc-André Drolet; 4,040; 9.11%	Frédérick Garon; 876; 1.98%	André Clermont; 962; 2.17%		Gilbert Normand†; Bellechasse—Etchemins—Montmagny—L'Islet

==== Maps ====
1. Gaspésie-Îles-de-la-Madeleine
2. Lévis-Bellechasse
3. Matapédia-Matane
4. Rimouski-Témiscouata
5. Rivière-du-Loup-Montmagny
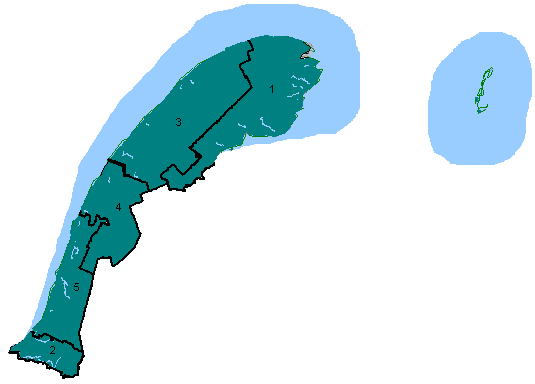
Key map

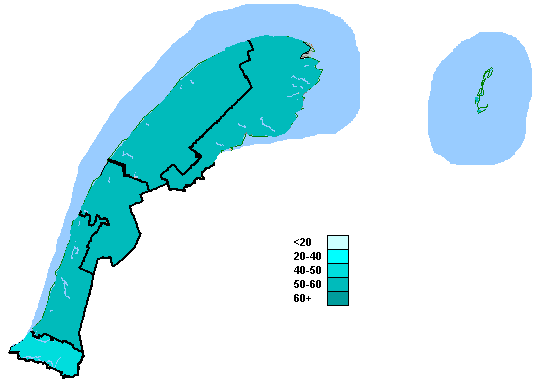
Bloc Québécois

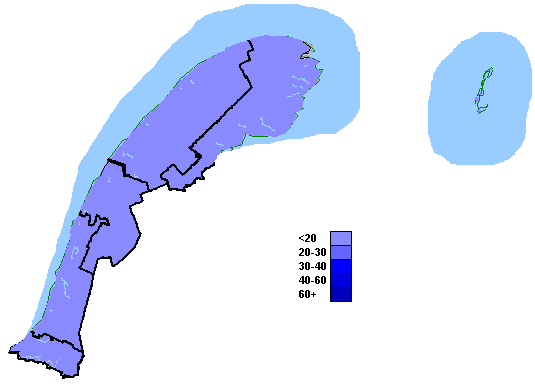
Conservative Party of Canada

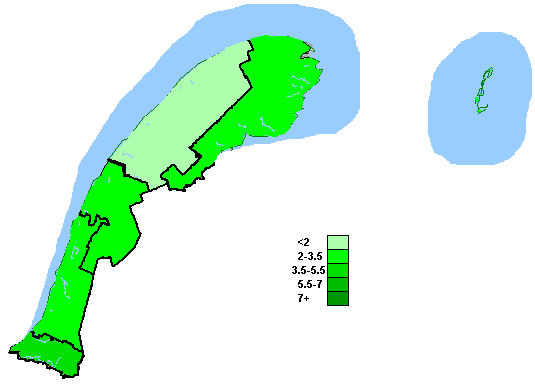
Green Party of Canada

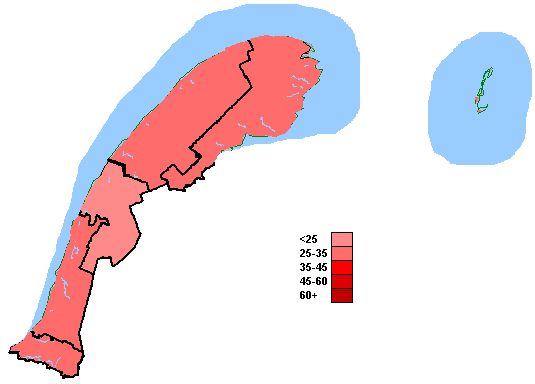
Liberal Party of Canada

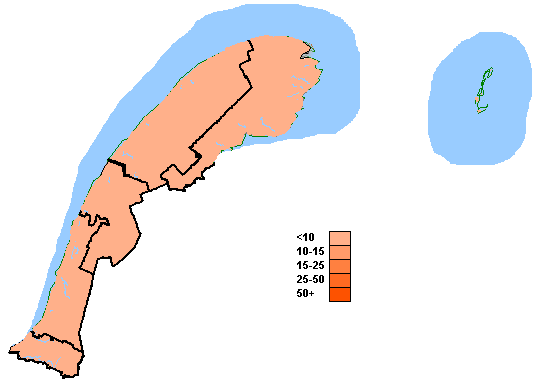
New Democratic Party

=== 2000 ===
Electoral district	Candidates						Incumbent
Electoral district	BQ	Liberal	Canadian Alliance	NDP	PC	Other	Incumbent
Bellechasse—Etchemins—Montmagny—L'Islet	François Langlois; 14,973; 37.44%	Gilbert Normand; 19,163; 47.91%	Jean-Claude Roy; 4,224; 10.56%		Suzanne Lafond; 1,636; 4.09%		Gilbert Normand
Bonaventure—Gaspé—Îles-de-la-Madeleine—Pabok	Raynald Blais; 15,532; 43.00%	Georges Farrah; 19,213; 53.19%	Linda Fournier; 764; 2.12%	Fred Kraenzel; 613; 1.70%			Yvan Bernier
Kamouraska—Rivière-du-Loup—Témiscouata—Les Basques	Paul Crête; 23,319; 59.99%	Helen Ouellet; 11,794; 30.34%	René Théberge; 1,373; 3.53%	Elaine Côté; 836; 2.15%	André Pacquet; 1,382; 3.56%	Normand Fournier (M-L); 170; 0.44%	Paul Crête
Lévis-et-Chutes-de-la-Chaudière	Antoine Dubé; 26,398; 41.85%	Shirley Baril; 21,522; 34.12%	Jacques Bergeron; 9,152; 14.51%	France Michaud; 1,411; 2.24%	Réal St-Laurent; 4,222; 6.69%	André Cloutier (Comm.); 374; 0.59%	Antoine Dubé; Lévis
Matapédia—Matane	Jean-Yves Roy; 14,678; 46.64%	Marc Bélanger; 14,402; 45.76%		Karine Paquet-Gauthier; 935; 2.97%	Germain Dumas; 1,456; 4.63%		René Canuel
Rimouski—Neigette-et-La-Mitis	Suzanne Tremblay; 19,759; 59.55%	Réal Marmen; 9,795; 29.52%	Gerard Gosselin; 1,280; 3.86%	René Lemieux; 525; 1.58%	Réal Blais; 1,150; 3.47%	Lyse Beauchemin (NLP); 673; 2.03%	Suzanne Tremblay; Rimouski—Mitis

=== 1997 ===
Electoral district	Candidates					Incumbent
Electoral district	BQ	Liberal	PC	NDP	Other	Incumbent
Bellechasse—Etchemins—Montmagny—L'Islet	François Langlois; 14,053	Gilbert Normand; 14,100	Denis Roy; 12,840	Branda Michaud; 520	Gaétan Pouliot (Reform); 611	François Langlois; Bellechasse
Bonaventure—Gaspé—Îles-de-la-Madeleine—Pabok	Yvan Bernier; 15,983	Patrick Gagnon; 15,804	Yves Quinton; 6,297	Dennis P. Drainville; 649		Patrick Gagnon; Bonaventure—Îles-de-la-Madeleine
Bonaventure—Gaspé—Îles-de-la-Madeleine—Pabok	Yvan Bernier; 15,983	Patrick Gagnon; 15,804	Yves Quinton; 6,297	Dennis P. Drainville; 649		merged district
Bonaventure—Gaspé—Îles-de-la-Madeleine—Pabok	Yvan Bernier; 15,983	Patrick Gagnon; 15,804	Yves Quinton; 6,297	Dennis P. Drainville; 649		Yvan Bernier; Gaspé
Kamouraska—Rivière-du-Loup—Témiscouata—Les Basques	Paul Crête; 16,518	France Dionne; 14,119	André Plourde; 11,623	Elaine Côté; 420	Armand Pouliot (NL); 480	Paul Crête; Kamouraska—Rivière-du-Loup
Lévis	Antoine Dubé; 27,870	Jocelyne Gosselin; 17,256	Thérèse Boucher; 14,630	France Michaud; 1,881		Antoine Dubé
Matapédia—Matane	René Canuel; 15,694	Robert Boulay; 10,558	Darryl Gray; 7,991	Anny-Jos Paquin; 417	Miville Couture (NL); 377	René Canuel
Rimouski—Mitis	Suzanne Tremblay; 17,282	Réal Marmen; 11,112	Jean Roy; 7,901	Elizabeth Clark; 479		Suzanne Tremblay; Rimouski—Témiscouata

=== 1993 ===
Electoral district	Candidates					Incumbent
Electoral district	BQ	Liberal	PC	NDP	Other	Incumbent
Bellechasse	François Langlois; 17,098	Eric Lemieux; 8,352	Pierre Blais; 15,952	Robert Leclerc; 695		Pierre Blais
Bonaventure—Îles-de-la-Madeleine	Michel Saint-Pierre; 9,228	Patrick Gagnon; 12,334	Darryl Gray; 6,019	Germaine Poirier; 377		Darryl Gray
Gaspé	Yvan Bernier; 13,123	Delton Sams; 10,074	Charles-Eugène Marin; 5,424	Germaine Poirier; 202	Michel Limoges (Green); 292	Charles-Eugène Marin
Kamouraska—Rivière-du-Loup	Paul Crête; 18,510	Maurice Tremblay; 7,479	André Plourde; 8,052	Hélène Bois; 476	Pierre-Paul Malenfant (Ind.); 542	André Plourde
Lévis	Antoine Dubé; 40,184	Jean-Marc Gagnon; 14,254	Serge Léveillé; 9,163	Marie-France Renaud; 1,182	Carole Carrier (Abol.); 705	Gabriel Fontaine
Matapédia—Matane	René Canuel; 18,331	Maurice Gauthier; 10,345	Jean-Luc Joncas; 2,446	Robert McKoy; 219	Pierre Gauthier (NL); 573	Jean-Luc Joncas
Rimouski—Témiscouata	Suzanne Tremblay; 23,118	André Reid; 9,454	Jean Morin; 4,622	Alex En Hwa Ng; 335	François-Michel Denis (Ind); 598; Gilles Roussel (NL); 400	Monique Vézina

=== 1988 ===
Electoral district	Candidates					Incumbent
Electoral district	PC	Liberal	NDP	Green	Other	Incumbent
Bellechasse	Pierre Blais; 27,621	Claudette Beaulieu; 11,120	Gilles Papillon; 2,762	Alain Raby; 1,010		Pierre Blais
Bonaventure—Îles-de-la-Madeleine	Darryl Gray; 15,491	Lyse Routhier; 9,296	Germaine Poirier; 1,546			Darryl Gray
Gaspé	Charles-Eugène Marin; 16,298	Delton Sams; 9,908	Bertrand Réhel; 1,504		710	Charles-Eugène Marin
Kamouraska—Rivière-du-Loup	André Plourde; 20,388	Gilles Desjardins; 10,353	Maurice Tremblay; 3,257	Marc Bilodeau; 685	192	André Plourde
Lévis	Gabriel Fontaine; 33,673	Denis Sonier; 13,002	John Paul Harney; 11,501		445	Gabriel Fontaine
Matapédia—Matane	Jean-Luc Joncas; 15,962	Claude Canuel; 11,584	Yves Coté; 4,253			Jean-Luc Joncas
Rimouski—Témiscouata	Monique Vézina; 23,789	Eva Lachance Côté; 10,561	Pierre Boisjoli; 2,417		1,210	Monique Vézina
