= Quebec federal electoral districts =

Government regions in Canadian province

This is a list of 78 federal electoral districts in the province of Quebec. New boundaries will be in effect for federal general elections called after April 22, 2024

== Quebec City Area ==
=== Capitale-Nationale ===
- Beauport—Limoilou
- Beauport—Côte-de-Beaupré—Île d'Orléans—Charlevoix
- Charlesbourg—Haute-Saint-Charles
- Louis-Hébert
- Louis-Saint-Laurent
- Portneuf—Jacques-Cartier
- Québec

=== Chaudière-Appalaches ===
- Beauce
- Bellechasse—Les Etchemins—Lévis
- Lévis—Lotbinière

== The Eastern Townships ==
=== Centre-du-Québec ===
- Bécancour—Nicolet—Saurel
- Drummond
- Mégantic—L'Érable

=== Estrie ===
- Compton—Stanstead
- Richmond—Arthabaska
- Sherbrooke

=== Montérégie Est ===
- Brome—Missisquoi
- Saint-Hyacinthe—Bagot
- Shefford

== Central Quebec ==
=== Lanaudière ===
- Joliette
- Montcalm
- Repentigny
- Terrebonne

=== Mauricie ===
- Berthier—Maskinongé
- Saint-Maurice—Champlain
- Trois-Rivières

== Côte-Nord and Saguenay ==
=== Saguenay–Lac-Saint-Jean ===
- Chicoutimi—Le Fjord
- Jonquière
- Lac-Saint-Jean

=== Côte-Nord ===
- Manicouagan

== Eastern Quebec ==
=== Bas-Saint-Laurent ===
- Avignon—La Mitis—Matane—Matapédia
- Montmagny—L'Islet—Kamouraska—Rivière-du-Loup
- Rimouski-Neigette—Témiscouata—Les Basques

=== Gaspésie–Îles-de-la-Madeleine ===
- Gaspésie—Les Îles-de-la-Madeleine

== The Laurentides, Outaouais and Northern Quebec ==
=== Laurentides ===
- Laurentides—Labelle
- Mirabel
- Rivière-des-Mille-Îles
- Rivière-du-Nord
- Thérèse-De Blainville

=== Outaouais ===
- Argenteuil—La Petite-Nation
- Gatineau
- Hull—Aylmer
- Pontiac

=== Northern Quebec (Nord-du-Québec and Abitibi-Témiscamingue) ===
- Abitibi—Baie-James—Nunavik—Eeyou
- Abitibi—Témiscamingue

== Montreal (East, West, North & Laval) ==
=== Laval ===
- Alfred-Pellan
- Laval—Les Îles
- Marc-Aurèle-Fortin
- Vimy

=== Montreal ===
- Ahuntsic-Cartierville
- Bourassa
- Dorval—Lachine—LaSalle
- Hochelaga
- Honoré-Mercier
- Lac-Saint-Louis
- LaSalle—Émard—Verdun
- Laurier—Sainte-Marie
- Mount Royal
- Notre-Dame-de-Grâce—Westmount
- Outremont
- Papineau
- Pierrefonds—Dollard
- La Pointe-de-l'Île
- Rosemont—La Petite-Patrie
- Saint-Laurent
- Saint-Léonard—Saint-Michel
- Ville-Marie—Le Sud-Ouest—Île-des-Sœurs

== Montérégie ==
- Beloeil—Chambly
- Brossard—Saint-Lambert
- Châteauguay—Lacolle
- Longueuil—Charles-LeMoyne
- Longueuil—Saint-Hubert
- Montarville
- Pierre-Boucher—Les Patriotes—Verchères
- La Prairie
- Saint-Jean
- Salaberry—Suroît
- Vaudreuil—Soulanges
