= François Lapointe =

François Lapointe may refer to:

- François Lapointe (racewalker) (born 1961), Canadian retired racewalker
- François Lapointe (politician) (born 1962), Canadian politician
