= Îles-de-la-Madeleine (provincial electoral district) =

Provincial electoral district in Quebec, Canada

Coordinates: 47°26′N 61°44′W

Quebec electoral district
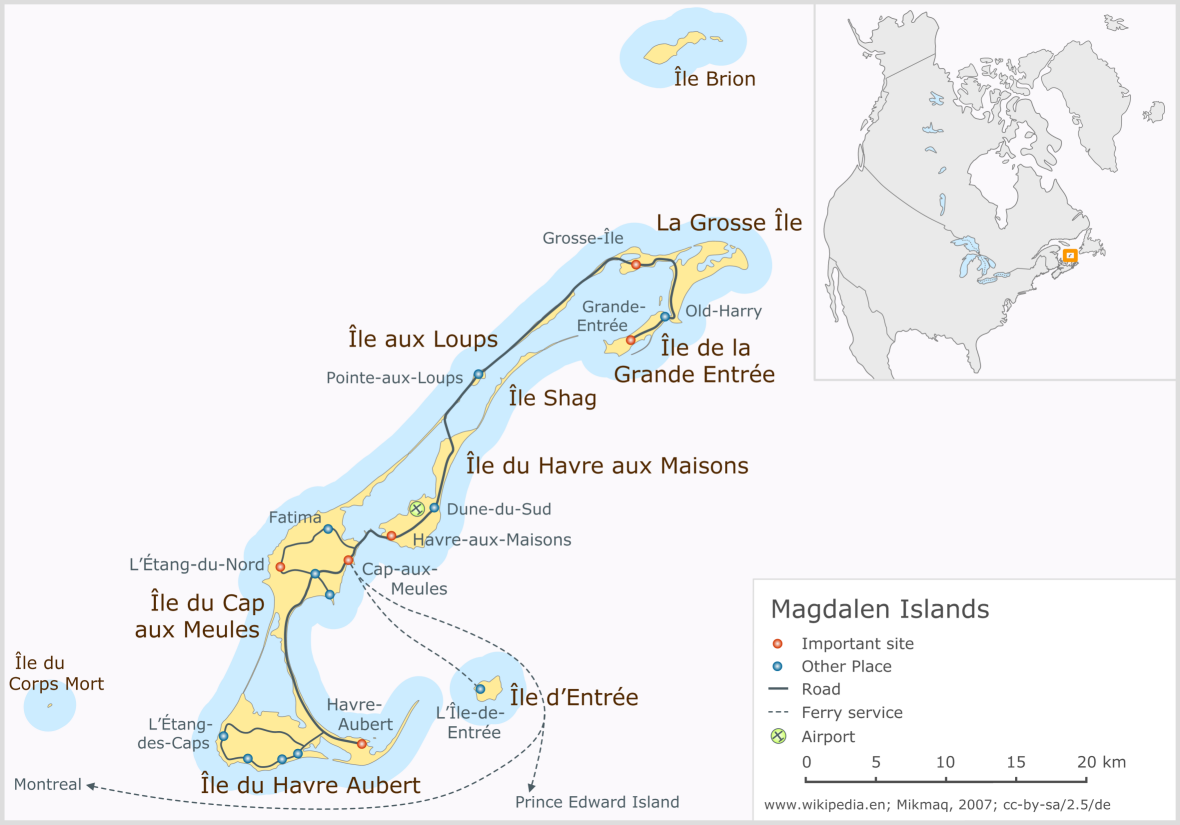

Provincial electoral district
- Legislature: National Assembly of Quebec
MNA
Joël Arseneau
Parti Québécois
- District created: 1895
- First contested: 1897
- Last contested: 2026

Demographics
- Population (2011): 12,780
- Electors (2018): 10,729
- Area (km²): 33,923.8
- Pop. density (per km²): 0.38
- Census division: Les Îles-de-la-Madeleine
- Census subdivision(s): Grosse-Île, Les Îles-de-la-Madeleine

Îles-de-la-Madeleine (French pronunciation: [il də la madlɛn]) is a provincial electoral district in the Gaspésie–Îles-de-la-Madeleine region of Quebec, Canada, that elects members to the National Assembly of Quebec. It consists of the Magdalen Islands and notably includes the city of Les Îles-de-la-Madeleine.

It was created for the 1897 election from a part of Gaspé electoral district.

In the change from the 2001 to the 2011 electoral map, its territory was unchanged; its territory is defined by the Election Act and does not undergo territorial changes.

== Members of the Legislative Assembly / National Assembly ==
This riding has elected the following members of the National Assembly:

Legislature	Years	Member	Party
Riding created from Gaspé
9th	1897–1900	Patrick Peter Delaney	Liberal
10th	1900–1904	Patrick Peter Delaney	Liberal
11th	1904–1905	Robert Jamieson Leslie	Liberal
11th	1906–1908	Louis-Albin Thériault	Liberal
12th	1908–1912	Louis-Albin Thériault	Liberal
13th	1912–1916	Joseph-Édouard Caron	Liberal
14th	1916–1919	Joseph-Édouard Caron	Liberal
15th	1919–1923	Joseph-Édouard Caron	Liberal
16th	1923–1927	Joseph-Édouard Caron	Liberal
17th	1927–1927	Joseph-Édouard Caron	Liberal
17th	1928–1931	Amédée Caron	Liberal
18th	1931–1935	Amédée Caron	Liberal
19th	1935–1936	Amédée Caron	Liberal
20th	1936–1939	Hormisdas Langlais	Union Nationale
21st	1939–1944	Hormisdas Langlais	Union Nationale
22nd	1944–1948	Hormisdas Langlais	Union Nationale
23rd	1948–1952	Hormisdas Langlais	Union Nationale
24th	1952–1956	Hormisdas Langlais	Union Nationale
25th	1956–1960	Hormisdas Langlais	Union Nationale
26th	1960–1962	Hormisdas Langlais	Union Nationale
27th	1962–1966	Louis-Philippe Lacroix	Liberal
28th	1966–1970	Louis-Philippe Lacroix	Liberal
29th	1970–1973	Louis-Philippe Lacroix	Liberal
30th	1973–1976	Louis-Philippe Lacroix	Liberal
31st	1976–1981	Denise Leblanc	Parti Québécois
32nd	1981–1984	Denise Leblanc	Parti Québécois
32nd	1984–1985	Denise Leblanc	Independent
33rd	1985–1989	Georges Farrah	Liberal
34th	1989–1994	Georges Farrah	Liberal
35th	1994–1998	Georges Farrah	Liberal
36th	1998–2003	Maxime Arseneau	Parti Québécois
37th	2003–2007	Maxime Arseneau	Parti Québécois
38th	2007–2008	Maxime Arseneau	Parti Québécois
39th	2008–2012	Germain Chevarie	Liberal
40th	2012–2014	Jeannine Richard	Parti Québécois
41st	2014–2018	Germain Chevarie	Liberal
42nd	2018–2022	Joël Arseneau	Parti Québécois
43rd	2022–2026	Joël Arseneau	Parti Québécois
44th	2026–Present	Joël Arseneau	Parti Québécois

== Election results ==
2026 Quebec general election
** Preliminary results — Not yet official **
Party	Candidate	Votes	%	±%
Parti Québécois	Joël Arseneau	5,061	66.54	+20.19
Liberal	Gil Thériault	1,560	20.51	+13.26
Québec solidaire	Zachary Jean	338	4.44	–0.94
Coalition Avenir Québec	Linda Lebel	330	4.34	–35.57
Conservative	Evan Leblanc	202	2.66	+1.55
Parti nul	Mélodie Caron	115	1.51	N/A
Total valid votes		7,606	98.36	–0.60
Total rejected ballots		127	1.64	+0.60
Turnout		7,733	69.32	–6.42
Electors on the lists		11,155		
Parti Québécois hold		Swing		+3.47
Source: Élections Québec

2022 Quebec general election
Party	Candidate	Votes	%	±%
Parti Québécois	Joël Arseneau	3,877	46.35	+7.70
Coalition Avenir Québec	Jonathan Lapierre	3,338	39.91	+30.57
Liberal	Gil Thériault	606	7.25	–31.21
Québec solidaire	Jean-Philippe Déraspe	450	5.38	–8.17
Conservative	Evan Leblanc	93	1.11	New
Total valid votes		8,364	98.96	
Total rejected ballots		88	1.04	–0.90
Turnout		8,452	75.74	+3.08
Electors on the lists		11,159		
Parti Québécois hold		Swing		–11.44
Source: Élections Québec

2018 Quebec general election
Party	Candidate	Votes	%	±%
Parti Québécois	Joël Arseneau	2,955	38.65	-1.48
Liberal	Maryse Lapierre	2,940	38.46	-11.66
Québec solidaire	Robert Boudreau-Welsh	1,036	13.55	+7.52
Coalition Avenir Québec	Yves Renaud	714	9.34	+6.17
Total valid votes		7,645	98.06	
Total rejected ballots		151	1.94	
Turnout		7,796	72.66	
Eligible voters		10,729		
Parti Québécois gain from Liberal		Swing		+5.09
Source(s) "Rapport des résultats officiels du scrutin". Élections Québec.

2014 Quebec general election
Party	Candidate	Votes	%	±%
Liberal	Germain Chevarie	4,137	50.07	+11.62
Parti Québécois	Jeannine Richard	3,319	40.17	-10.84
Québec solidaire	Natalia Porowska	499	6.04	+1.26
Coalition Avenir Québec	Mario-Michel Jomphe	262	3.17	-1.65
Option nationale	David Boudreau	46	0.56	-0.40
Total valid votes		8,263	98.85	–
Total rejected ballots		96	1.15	–
Turnout		8,359	77.01	-1.07
Electors on the lists		10,855	–	–

2012 Quebec general election
Party	Candidate	Votes	%	±%
Parti Québécois	Jeannine Richard	4,304	51.01	+5.65
Liberal	Germain Chevarie	3,244	38.45	-11.40
Coalition Avenir Québec	Georges Painchaud	407	4.82	+3.10*
Québec solidaire	Yvonne Langford	403	4.78	+3.54
Option nationale	Jonathan Godin	80	0.95	–
Total valid votes		8,438	98.88	–
Total rejected ballots		96	1.12	–
Turnout		8,534	78.08	+11.73
Electors on the lists		10,930	–	–

* Result compared to Action démocratique

2008 Quebec general election
Party	Candidate	Votes	%	±%
Liberal	Germain Chevarie	3,510	49.85	+16.75
Parti Québécois	Jeannine Richard	3,194	45.36	-15.03
Green	Nicolas Tremblay	129	1.83	+0.09
Action démocratique	Patrick Leblanc	121	1.72	-3.04
Québec solidaire	Jacques Bourbeau	87	1.24	–
Total valid votes		7,041	98.97	–
Total rejected ballots		73	1.03	–
Turnout		7,114	66.35	-9.75
Electors on the lists		10,722	–	–

2007 Quebec general election
Party	Candidate	Votes	%	±%
Parti Québécois	Maxime Arseneau	4,820	60.39	+1.70
Liberal	Pierre Proulx	2,642	33.10	-7.04
Action démocratique	Patrick Leblanc	380	4.76	+3.59
Green	Nicolas Tremblay	139	1.74	–
Total valid votes		7,981	99.07	–
Total rejected ballots		75	0.93	–
Turnout		8,056	76.10	-1.33
Electors on the lists		10,586	–	–

2003 Quebec general election
Party	Candidate	Votes	%	±%
Parti Québécois	Maxime Arseneau	4,606	58.69	+6.15
Liberal	Simone Leblanc	3,150	40.14	-5.87
Action démocratique	Évé Longuépée	92	1.17	-0.27
Total valid votes		7,848	98.95	–
Total rejected ballots		83	1.05	–
Turnout		7,931	77.43	-10.14
Electors on the lists		10,243	–	–

1998 Quebec general election
Party	Candidate	Votes	%	±%
Parti Québécois	Maxime Arseneau	4,732	52.54	+12.52
Liberal	Georges Farrah	4,144	46.01	-13.97
Action démocratique	Gaston Leblanc	130	1.44	–
Total valid votes		9,006	99.23	–
Total rejected ballots		70	0.77	–
Turnout		9,076	87.57	+1.16
Electors on the lists		10,364	–	–

1995 Quebec referendum
Side	Votes	%
Oui	5,478	58.13
Non	3,946	41.87

1994 Quebec general election
Party	Candidate	Votes	%	±%
Liberal	Georges Farrah	5,455	59.98	+8.49
Parti Québécois	Léonce Deraspe	3,639	40.02	-8.49

1992 Charlottetown Accord referendum
Side	Votes	%
Non	4,329	54.05
Oui	3,680	45.95

1989 Quebec general election
Party	Candidate	Votes	%	±%
Liberal	Georges Farrah	4,373	51.49	-4.53
Parti Québécois	Léonce Deraspe	4,120	48.51	+5.63

1985 Quebec general election
Party	Candidate	Votes	%	±%
Liberal	Georges Farrah	5,048	56.02	+21.56
Parti Québécois	Léonard Chevarie	3,864	42.88	-20.91
Union Nationale	Gervais Pomerleau	99	1.10	+0.41

1981 Quebec general election
Party	Candidate	Votes	%	±%
Parti Québécois	Denise Leblanc	5,278	63.79	+15.90
Liberal	Rosaire Arseneau	2,851	34.46	-12.59
Independent	Réal Lapierre	88	1.06	–
Union Nationale	Louis Foteas	57	0.69	-3.52

1980 Quebec referendum
Side	Votes	%
Non	4,033	54.22
Oui	3,405	45.78

1976 Quebec general election
Party	Candidate	Votes	%	±%
Parti Québécois	Denise Leblanc	3,387	47.89	+15.25
Liberal	Louis-Philippe Lacroix	3,327	47.05	-13.82
Union Nationale	Paul-Henri Tremblay	298	4.21	+1.40
Ralliement créditiste	Jean Cotten	60	0.85	-2.83

1973 Quebec general election
Party	Candidate	Votes	%	±%
Liberal	Louis-Philippe Lacroix	3,839	60.87	+4.19
Parti Québécois	Fernand Turbide	2,059	32.64	+26.81
Parti créditiste	Jean-Paul Audy	232	3.68	+2.57
Union Nationale	Gaston Dion	177	2.81	-33.57

1970 Quebec general election
Party	Candidate	Votes	%	±%
Liberal	Louis-Philippe Lacroix	3,560	56.68	-9.91
Union Nationale	Gilbert Carbonneau	2,285	36.38	+2.97
Parti Québécois	Pierre Gagnon	366	5.83	–
Ralliement créditiste	Simon Brouard	70	1.11	–

1966 Quebec general election
Party	Candidate	Votes	%	±%
Liberal	Louis-Philippe Lacroix	3,908	66.59	+14.73
Union Nationale	Gérard Gingras	1,961	33.41	-14.73

1962 Quebec general election
Party	Candidate	Votes	%	±%
Liberal	Louis-Philippe Lacroix	2,674	51.86	+8.85
Union Nationale	Hormisdas Langlais	2,482	48.14	-8.85

1960 Quebec general election
Party	Candidate	Votes	%	±%
Union Nationale	Hormisdas Langlais	2,759	56.99	+0.27
Liberal	Raynold Bélanger	2,082	43.01	-0.27

1956 Quebec general election
Party	Candidate	Votes	%	±%
Union Nationale	Hormisdas Langlais	2,591	56.72	-1.27
Liberal	Urbain Lajeunesse	1,977	43.28	+1.27

1952 Quebec general election
Party	Candidate	Votes	%	±%
Union Nationale	Hormisdas Langlais	2,463	57.99	-0.15
Liberal	François Fournier	1,784	42.01	+1.08

1948 Quebec general election
Party	Candidate	Votes	%	±%
Union Nationale	Hormisdas Langlais	2,442	58.14	+2.65
Liberal	Lionel-L. Gaudet	1,719	40.93	-3.58
Union des électeurs	Présille Beaulieu	39	0.93	–

1944 Quebec general election
Party	Candidate	Votes	%	±%
Union Nationale	Hormisdas Langlais	2,092	55.49	+1.90
Liberal	Irénée-R. Lebourdais	1,678	44.51	-1.90

1939 Quebec general election
Party	Candidate	Votes	%	±%
Union Nationale	Hormisdas Langlais	1,030	53.59	+3.21
Liberal	Amédée Caron	892	46.41	-3.21

1936 Quebec general election
Party	Candidate	Votes	%	±%
Union Nationale	Hormisdas Langlais	1,001	50.38	+30.81
Liberal	Amédée Caron	986	49.62	-17.67

1935 Quebec general election
Party	Candidate	Votes	%	±%
Liberal	Amédée Caron	1,358	67.29	+17.03
ALN	Hormisdas Langlais	395	19.57	–
Independent Lib.	Ovide Hubert	265	13.13	–

1931 Quebec general election
Party	Candidate	Votes	%
Liberal	Amédée Caron	769	50.26
Conservative	Gérard Simard	761	49.74

Quebec provincial by-election, July 14, 1928
Party	Candidate	Votes
Liberal	Amédée Caron	acclaimed

1927 Quebec general election
Party	Candidate	Votes
Liberal	Joseph-Édouard Caron	acclaimed

1923 Quebec general election
Party	Candidate	Votes
Liberal	Joseph-Édouard Caron	acclaimed

1919 Quebec general election
Party	Candidate	Votes
Liberal	Joseph-Édouard Caron	acclaimed

1916 Quebec general election
Party	Candidate	Votes
Liberal	Joseph-Édouard Caron	acclaimed

1912 Quebec general election
Party	Candidate	Votes	%	±%
Liberal	Joseph-Édouard Caron	733	57.49	+17.78
Conservative	Azade Arsenault	542	42.51	+7.44

1908 Quebec general election
Party	Candidate	Votes	%	±%
Liberal	Louis-Albin Thériault	411	39.71	-0.12
Conservative	François-Henri Delaney	363	35.07	–
Independent	William Chambers Leslie	261	25.22	-4.22

Quebec provincial by-election, November 20, 1906
Party	Candidate	Votes	%	±%
Liberal	Louis-Albin Thériault	429	39.83	–
Liberal	Patrick Peter Delaney	331	30.73	-4.49
Independent	William Chambers Leslie	317	29.44	–

1904 Quebec general election
Party	Candidate	Votes	%	±%
Liberal	Robert Jamieson Leslie	618	64.78	–
Liberal	Patrick Peter Delaney	336	35.22	-17.59

1900 Quebec general election
Party	Candidate	Votes	%	±%
Liberal	Patrick Peter Delaney	451	52.81	-0.61
Liberal	Louis-Albin Thériault	403	47.19	–

1897 Quebec general election
Party	Candidate	Votes	%
Liberal	Patrick Peter Delaney	469	53.42
Liberal	Charles-Albert Marcil	409	46.58

== See also ==
- List of Quebec provincial electoral districts
- Canadian provincial electoral districts
