= Gaspésie—Les Îles-de-la-Madeleine—Listuguj =

Federal electoral district in Quebec, Canada

Coordinates: 48.74°N 64.76°W

Quebec electoral district
- Interactive map of riding boundaries from the 2025 federal election

Federal electoral district
- Legislature: House of Commons
MP
Alexis Deschênes
Bloc Québécois
- District created: 2003
- First contested: 2004
- Last contested: 2025
- District webpage: profile, map

Demographics
- Population (2016): 75,850
- Electors (2021): 65,501
- Area (km²): 17,145
- Pop. density (per km²): 4.4
- Census division(s): Avignon, Bonaventure, Îles-de-la-Madeleine, La Côte-de-Gaspé, La Haute-Gaspésie, La Matanie, Le Rocher-Percé
- Census subdivision(s): Gaspé, Matane, Les-Îles-de-la-Madeleine, Chandler, Sainte-Anne-des-Monts, Carleton-sur-Mer, New Richmond, Grande-Rivière, Percé, Paspébiac

Gaspésie—Les Îles-de-la-Madeleine—Listuguj (formerly Gaspésie—Les Îles-de-la-Madeleine) is a federal electoral district (riding) in Quebec, Canada, that has been represented in the House of Commons since 2004.

It was created by the Representation Order of 2003 from parts of Bonaventure—Gaspé—Îles-de-la-Madeleine—Pabok and Matapédia—Matane.

Since 2025, its member of Parliament (MP) has been Alexis Deschênes of the Bloc Québécois (BQ).

== Geography ==
The riding occupies the eastern part of the Gaspé Peninsula, as well as the Magdalen Islands. The Magdalen Islands, being in the Atlantic time zone, report election results one hour earlier than the rest of the riding, which in the Eastern Time Zone with the rest of Quebec.

== History ==
From 2004 to 2011 it consisted of:

(a) the regional county municipalities of Bonaventure, La Côte-de-Gaspé and Le Rocher-Percé; (b) the Regional County Municipality of Avignon, including Gesgapegiag and Listuguj Indian reserves; and (c) the Municipality of Les Îles-de-la-Madeleine.

As per the 2012 federal electoral redistribution, the former riding of Gaspésie—Îles-de-la-Madeleine was dissolved, largely being replaced by Gaspésie—Les Îles-de-la-Madeleine, with the Avignon Regional County Municipality going to Avignon—La Mitis—Matane—Matapédia, and gaining La Haute-Gaspésie Regional County Municipality from Haute-Gaspésie—La Mitis—Matane—Matapédia.

Following the 2022 Canadian federal electoral redistribution, the riding was largely replaced by Gaspésie—Les Îles-de-la-Madeleine—Listuguj. It gained the entirety of the La Matanie Regional County Municipality and Avignon Regional County Municipality from Avignon—La Mitis—Matane—Matapédia.

== Demographics ==
According to the 2016 Canadian census

- Languages: (2016) 91.5% French, 8.1% English, 0.1% Spanish

== Riding associations ==
Riding associations are the local branches of political parties:

Party	Association name	CEO	HQ city
Conservative	Association du Parti conservateur Gaspésie--Les Îles-de-la-Madeleine-Listuguj	Jean-Pierre Pigeon	Sainte-Anne-des-Monts
Liberal	Association libérale fédérale Gaspésie--Les Îles-de-la-Madeleine--Listuguj	Gabriel Bourget	Grande-Rivière
New Democratic	NPD Gaspésie--Les Îles-de-la-Madeleine	Duncan Viktor Salvain	Montréal

== Member of Parliament ==
This riding has elected the following members of Parliament:

Parliament	Years	Member	Party
Gaspésie—Îles-de-la-Madeleine; Riding created from Bonaventure—Gaspé—Îles-de-la-Madeleine—Pabok and Matapédia—Matane
38th	2004–2006	Raynald Blais	Bloc Québécois
39th	2006–2008	Raynald Blais	Bloc Québécois
40th	2008–2011	Raynald Blais	Bloc Québécois
41st	2011–2015	Philip Toone	New Democratic
Gaspésie—Les Îles-de-la-Madeleine
42nd	2015–2019	Diane Lebouthillier	Liberal
43rd	2019–2021	Diane Lebouthillier	Liberal
44th	2021–2025	Diane Lebouthillier	Liberal
Gaspésie—Les Îles-de-la-Madeleine—Listuguj
45th	2025–present	Alexis Deschênes	Bloc Québécois

== Election results ==
=== Gaspésie—Les Îles-de-la-Madeleine—Listuguj, 2023 representation order ===
2025 Canadian federal election
Party	Candidate	Votes	%	±%	Expenditures
Bloc Québécois	Alexis Deschênes	26,091	45.79	+1.45	
Liberal	Diane Lebouthillier	21,817	38.29	-1.47	
Conservative	Jean-Pierre Pigeon	7,047	12.37	+4.11	
New Democratic	Denise Giroux	1,005	1.76	-2.51	
Rhinoceros	Shawn Grenier	572	1.00	N/A	
People's	Christian Rioux	452	0.79	-1.22	
Total valid votes/expense limit		56,984	98.54		
Total rejected ballots		845	1.46		
Turnout		57,829	60.48		
Eligible voters		95,615			
Bloc Québécois notional hold		Swing		+1.46	
Source: Elections Canada
Note: number of eligible voters does not include voting day registrations.

2021 federal election redistributed results
Party	Vote	%
Bloc Québécois	23,743	44.34
Liberal	21,289	39.76
Conservative	4,421	8.26
New Democratic	2,288	4.27
People's	1,074	2.01
Others	731	1.37

=== Gaspésie—Les Îles-de-la-Madeleine, 2013 representation order ===
2021 Canadian federal election: Gaspésie—Les Îles-de-la-Madeleine
Party	Candidate	Votes	%	±%	Expenditures
Liberal	Diane Lebouthillier	17,099	46.4	+3.9	$82,566.31
Bloc Québécois	Guy Bernatchez	14,481	39.3	-1.5	$12,869.61
Conservative	Jean-Pierre Pigeon	3,010	8.2	+0.3	$9,458.03
New Democratic	Lisa Phung	1,358	3.7	-0.8	$744.35
People's	Christian Rioux	621	1.7	+1.2	$995.81
Free	Monique Leduc	289	0.8	N/A	$1,116.77
Total valid votes/expense limit		36,858	97.9	–	$112,788.79
Total rejected ballots		778	2.1		
Turnout		37,636	57.5		
Registered voters		65,501			
Liberal hold		Swing		+2.7	
Source: Elections Canada

2019 Canadian federal election: Gaspésie—Les Îles-de-la-Madeleine
Party	Candidate	Votes	%	±%	Expenditures
Liberal	Diane Lebouthillier	16,296	42.5	+3.8	$53,469.21
Bloc Québécois	Guy Bernatchez	15,659	40.8	+19.9	none listed
Conservative	Jean-Pierre Pigeon	3,022	7.9	+1.8	$9,786.76
New Democratic	Lynn Beaulieu	1,722	4.5	-28.0	none listed
Green	Dennis Drainville	1,130	2.9	+1.9	none listed
Rhinoceros	Jay Cowboy	353	0.9	+0.1	$0.00
People's	Eric Hébert	198	0.5		$2,821.16
Total valid votes/expense limit		38,380	100.0		
Total rejected ballots		783			
Turnout		39,163	60.5		
Eligible voters		64,748			
Liberal hold		Swing		-8.05	
Source: Elections Canada and CBC

2015 Canadian federal election: Gaspésie—Les Îles-de-la-Madeleine
Party	Candidate	Votes	%	±%	Expenditures
Liberal	Diane Lebouthillier	15,345	38.73	+21.69	$34,217.07
New Democratic	Philip Toone	12,885	32.52	+3.69	$45,644.59
Bloc Québécois	Nicholas Roussy	8,289	20.92	-12.15	$51,177.09
Conservative	Jean-Pierre Pigeon	2,398	6.05	-13.02	$9,215.28
Green	Jim Morrison	400	1.01	-0.98	–
Rhinoceros	Max Boudreau	300	0.76	–	–
Total valid votes/expense limit		39,617	100.0		$215,809.52
Total rejected ballots		395	–	–	
Turnout		40,012	60.97	–	
Eligible voters		65,623			
Source: Elections Canada

2011 federal election redistributed results
Party	Vote	%
Bloc Québécois	11,684	33.07
New Democratic	10,186	28.83
Conservative	6,739	19.07
Liberal	6,020	17.04
Green	702	1.99

=== Gaspésie—Îles-de-la-Madeleine, 2003 representation order ===
2011 Canadian federal election: Gaspésie—Îles-de-la-Madeleine
Party	Candidate	Votes	%	±%	Expenditures
New Democratic	Philip Toone	12,427	33.76	+26.78	none listed
Bloc Québécois	Daniel Côté	11,650	31.64	−8.46	$39,768.78
Conservative	Régent Bastien	6,292	17.09	−5.75	$48,704.71
Liberal	Jules Duguay	5,533	15.03	−11.93	none listed
Green	Julien Leblanc	913	2.48	−0.63	$328.10
Total valid votes/expense limit		36,815	100.0		$90,208.08
Total rejected, unmarked and declined ballots		571	1.53	+0.33	
Turnout		37,386	53.85	−0.26	
Eligible voters		69,429			
New Democratic gain from Bloc Québécois		Swing		+17.62	

2008 Canadian federal election
Party	Candidate	Votes	%	±%	Expenditures
Bloc Québécois	Raynald Blais	14,636	40.10	-2.59	$35,057.79
Liberal	Denis Gauvreau	9,840	26.96	+7.70	$75,736.95
Conservative	Darryl Gray	8,334	22.84	-9.39	$61,592.38
New Democratic	Gaston Langlais	2,549	6.98	+4.02	$1,775.37
Green	Julien Leblanc	1,136	3.11	+0.25	$157.00
Total valid votes/Expense limit		36,495	100.0		$86,955
Total rejected, unmarked and declined ballots		445	1.20	+0.07	
Turnout		36,940	54.11	-7.04	
Eligible voters		68,270			
Bloc Québécois hold		Swing		-5.14	

2006 Canadian federal election
Party	Candidate	Votes	%	±%	Expenditures
Bloc Québécois	Raynald Blais	17,678	42.69	-12.98	$39,804.88
Conservative	Gaston Langlais	13,347	32.23	+25.39	$16,170.29
Liberal	Mario Levesque	7,977	19.26	-13.39	$27,785.44
New Democratic	Sophie Dauphinais	1,225	2.96	+0.87	$1,237.16
Green	Bob Eichenberger	1,183	2.86	+0.11	$325.71
Total valid votes/Expense limit		41,410	100.0		$80,993
Total rejected, unmarked and declined ballots		474	1.13	-0.30	
Turnout		41,884	61.15	+4.58	
Eligible voters		68,494			
Bloc Québécois hold		Swing		-19.18	

2004 Canadian federal election: Gaspésie—Îles-de-la-Madeleine
Party	Candidate	Votes	%	±%	Expenditures
Bloc Québécois	Raynald Blais	21,446	55.67	+13.10	$44,886.71
Liberal	Georges Farrah	12,579	32.65	−20.15	$44,503.86
Conservative	Guy De Coste	2,636	6.84	+4.17	$12,110.72
Green	Bob Eichenberger	1,060	2.75	–	none listed
New Democratic	Philip Toone	805	2.09	+0.13	$1,695.37
Total valid votes/expense limit		38,526	100.00		$79,194
Total rejected, unmarked and declined ballots		559	1.43		
Turnout		39,085	56.57	−5.93	
Eligible voters		69,089			
Bloc Québécois notional gain from Liberal		Swing		+16.62	

2000 federal election redistributed results
Party	Vote	%
Liberal	22,302	52.80
Bloc Québécois	17,981	42.57
New Democratic	827	1.96
Alliance	741	1.75
Progressive Conservative	388	0.92

== See also ==
- List of Canadian electoral districts
- Historical federal electoral districts of Canada
