= Joël Arseneau =

Canadian politician

Joël Arseneau MNA
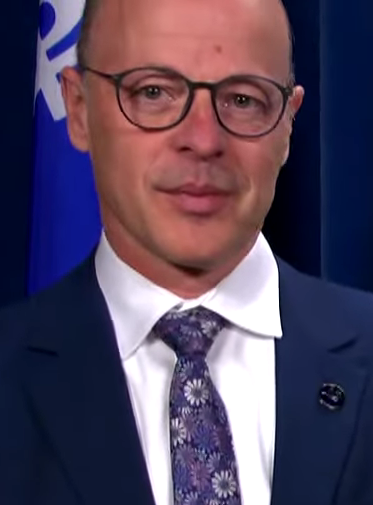
- Arseneau in 2023

Member of the National Assembly of Quebec for Îles-de-la-Madeleine
- Incumbent
- Assumed office October 1, 2018
- Preceded by: Germain Chevarie

Personal details
- Born: 1965 Cap-aux-Meules, Quebec
- Party: Parti Québecois

Joël Arseneau is a Canadian politician, who was elected to the National Assembly of Quebec in the 2018 provincial election. He represents the electoral district of Îles-de-la-Madeleine as a member of the Parti Québécois.

As of September 8, 2024, he serves as the parliamentary leader of the Parti Québécois and the party's spokesperson on Health, Transport, International Relations and Francophonie, Mental Health, Loneliness, Fisheries and Mariculture, and for the Maritime Strategy.

Arseneau previously served as mayor of Les Îles-de-la-Madeleine from 2005 to 2013. He was removed from office on fraud charges resulting from delayed expense claim payments. Although he was acquitted of the charges on the grounds that the issue was a personal accounting error rather than a deliberate attempt to defraud the municipality, he was barred in 2015 from running for municipal office for five years, leading to some controversy when his selection as a Parti Québécois candidate for the provincial legislature was announced.

== Electoral record ==
=== Provincial ===
2022 Quebec general election: Îles-de-la-Madeleine
Party	Candidate	Votes	%	±%
Parti Québécois	Joël Arseneau	3,877	46.35	+7.70
Coalition Avenir Québec	Jonathan Lapierre	3,338	39.91	+30.57
Liberal	Gil Thériault	606	7.25	–31.21
Québec solidaire	Jean-Philippe Déraspe	450	5.38	–8.17
Conservative	Evan Leblanc	93	1.11	New
Total valid votes		8,364	98.96	
Total rejected ballots		88	1.04	–0.90
Turnout		8,452	75.74	+3.08
Electors on the lists		11,159		
Parti Québécois hold		Swing		–11.44
Source: Élections Québec

2018 Quebec general election: Îles-de-la-Madeleine
Party	Candidate	Votes	%	±%
Parti Québécois	Joël Arseneau	2,955	38.65	-1.48
Liberal	Maryse Lapierre	2,940	38.46	-11.66
Québec solidaire	Robert Boudreau-Welsh	1,036	13.55	+7.52
Coalition Avenir Québec	Yves Renaud	714	9.34	+6.17
Total valid votes		7,645	98.06	
Total rejected ballots		151	1.94	
Turnout		7,796	72.66	
Eligible voters		10,729		
Parti Québécois gain from Liberal		Swing		+5.09
Source(s) "Rapport des résultats officiels du scrutin". Élections Québec.
