= Alexis Deschênes =

Canadian politician

Alexis Deschênes MP
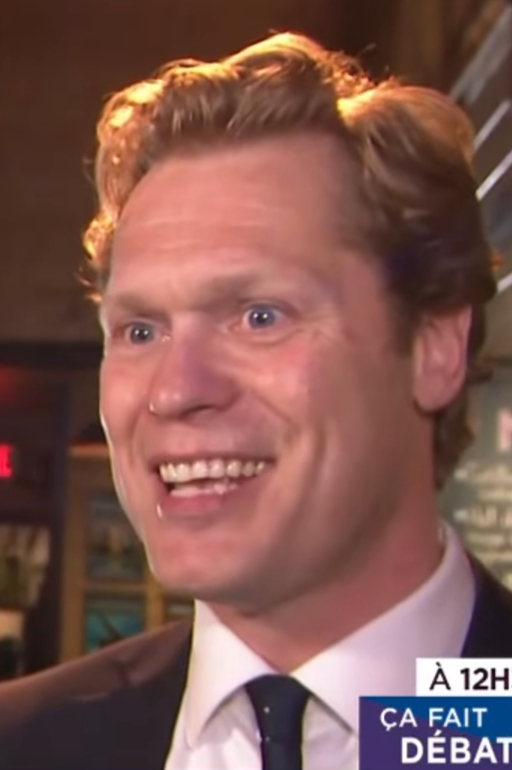

Member of Parliament for Gaspésie—Les Îles-de-la-Madeleine—Listuguj
- Incumbent
- Assumed office April 28, 2025
- Preceded by: Diane Lebouthillier

Personal details
- Party: Bloc Québécois
- Other political affiliations: Parti Québécois

Alexis Deschênes MP is a Canadian politician from the Bloc Québécois. He was elected Member of Parliament for Gaspésie—Les Îles-de-la-Madeleine—Listuguj in the 2025 Canadian federal election. He unseated cabinet minister Diane Lebouthillier. He was previously a lawyer and journalist. He was elected vice chair of the Canadian House of Commons Standing Committee on Fisheries and Oceans in the 45th Canadian Parliament in 2025.

In the 2014 Quebec general election, he was a candidate for the Parti Québécois in Trois-Rivières, and again in the 2022 Quebec general election in Bonaventure, but was not elected.

At the time of the 2025 Canadian federal election, he lived in Carleton-sur-Mer.

== Electoral record ==
2025 Canadian federal election: Gaspésie—Les Îles-de-la-Madeleine—Listuguj
Party	Candidate	Votes	%	±%	Expenditures
Bloc Québécois	Alexis Deschênes	26,091	45.79	+1.45	
Liberal	Diane Lebouthillier	21,817	38.29	-1.47	
Conservative	Jean-Pierre Pigeon	7,047	12.37	+4.11	
New Democratic	Denise Giroux	1,005	1.76	-2.51	
Rhinoceros	Shawn Grenier	572	1.00	N/A	
People's	Christian Rioux	452	0.79	-1.22	
Total valid votes/expense limit		56,984	98.54		
Total rejected ballots		845	1.46		
Turnout		57,829	60.48		
Eligible voters		95,615			
Bloc Québécois notional hold		Swing		+1.46	
Source: Elections Canada
Note: number of eligible voters does not include voting day registrations.

2022 Quebec general election: Bonaventure
Party	Candidate	Votes	%	±%
Coalition Avenir Québec	Catherine Blouin	9,919	44.45	+28.45
Parti Québécois	Alexis Deschênes	6,708	30.06	–8.40
Québec solidaire	Catherine Cyr Wright	2,417	10.83	–4.17
Liberal	Christian Cyr	1,911	8.56	–16.96
Conservative	François Therrien	1,219	5.46	New
L'Union fait la force	Anne Marie Lauzon	82	0.37	New
Climat Québec	Jocelyn Rioux	57	0.26	New
Total valid votes		22,313	98.86	
Total rejected ballots		257	1.14	+0.04
Turnout		22,570	62.76	+0.50
Electors on the lists		35,960		
Coalition Avenir Québec gain from Parti Québécois		Swing		+18.42
Source: Élections Québec

2014 Quebec general election
Party	Candidate	Votes	%
Liberal	Jean-Denis Girard	11,658	39.16
Parti Québécois	Alexis Deschênes	8,452	28.39
Coalition Avenir Québec	Diego Brunelle	6,634	22.28
Québec solidaire	Jean-Claude Landry	2,531	8.50
Conservative	Pierre-Louis Bonneau	260	0.87
Option nationale	André de Repentigny	238	0.80
Total valid votes		29,773	98.05
Total rejected ballots		593	1.95
Turnout		30,366	69.00
Electors on the lists		43,721	–
