= Philip Toone =

Canadian politician

Member of Parliament for Gaspésie—Îles-de-la-Madeleine
- In office May 2, 2011 – August 4, 2015
- Preceded by: Raynald Blais
- Succeeded by: Diane Lebouthillier

Personal details
- Born: 1965 (age 60–61) Ottawa, Ontario, Canada
- Party: New Democratic Party
- Profession: teacher

Philip Toone (born 1965) is a Canadian politician, who was elected to the House of Commons of Canada in the 2011 election.

== Early life ==
Philip Toone was born in Ottawa in 1965. He currently resides in Maria, Quebec, with his partner of 13 years. His former occupation was that of a teacher and notary.

== Political career ==
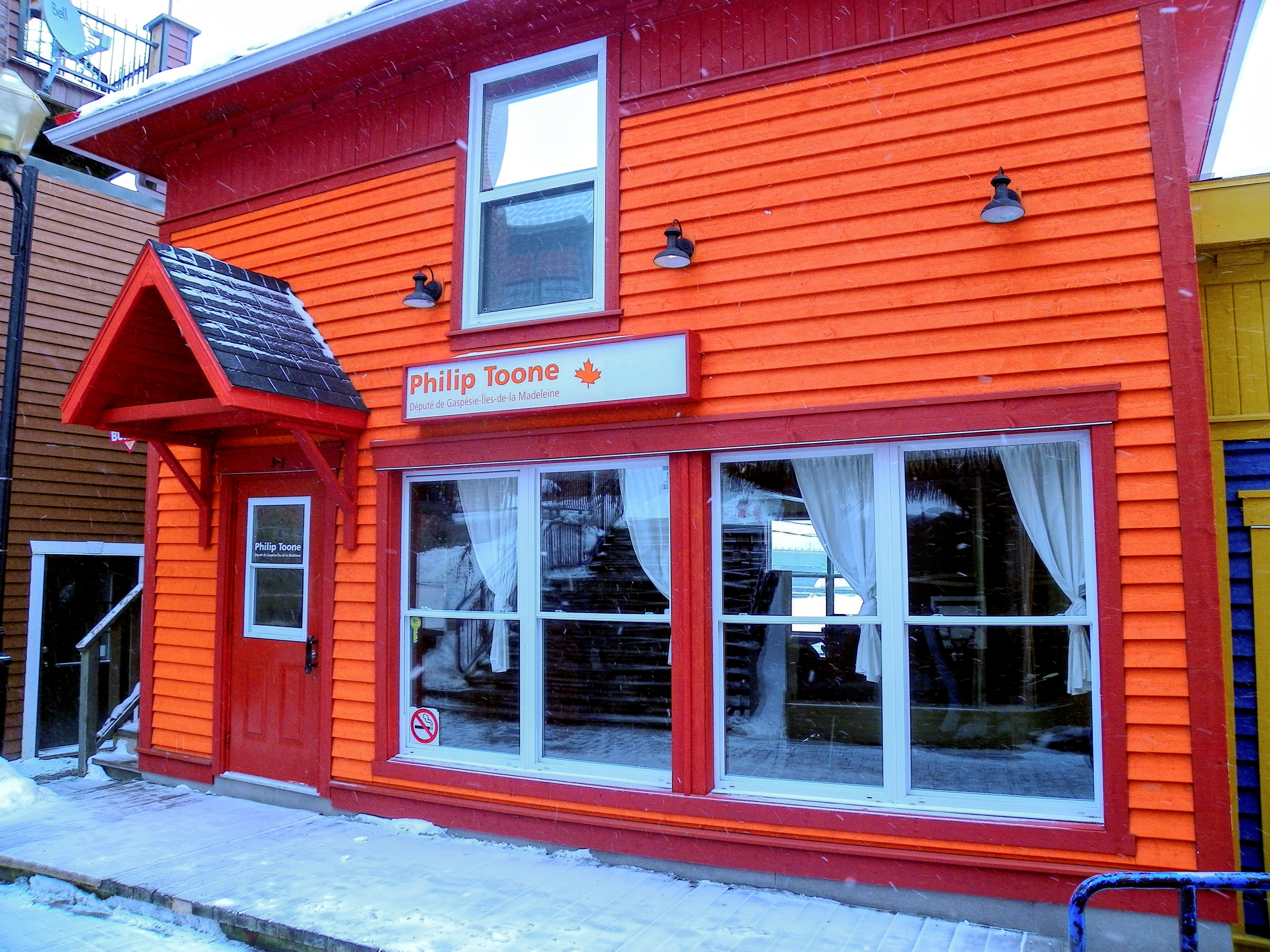
Toone's constituency office

Toone ran for a seat to the Canadian House of Commons in the 2004 Canadian federal election. He was defeated finishing in fifth place losing to incumbent Raynald Blais in the electoral district of Gaspésie—Îles-de-la-Madeleine. He ran for a second time in the 2011 Canadian federal election and won.

He was one of five openly gay candidates elected to Parliament in the 2011 election.

He was defeated in the 2015 election by Diane Lebouthillier of the Liberal Party.

== Election results ==
2015 Canadian federal election: Gaspésie—Les Îles-de-la-Madeleine
Party	Candidate	Votes	%	±%	Expenditures
Liberal	Diane Lebouthillier	15,345	38.73	+21.69	$34,217.07
New Democratic	Philip Toone	12,885	32.52	+3.69	$45,644.59
Bloc Québécois	Nicholas Roussy	8,289	20.92	-12.15	$51,177.09
Conservative	Jean-Pierre Pigeon	2,398	6.05	-13.02	$9,215.28
Green	Jim Morrison	400	1.01	-0.98	–
Rhinoceros	Max Boudreau	300	0.76	–	–
Total valid votes/expense limit		39,617	100.0		$215,809.52
Total rejected ballots		395	–	–	
Turnout		40,012	60.97	–	
Eligible voters		65,623			
Source: Elections Canada

2011 Canadian federal election: Gaspésie—Îles-de-la-Madeleine
Party	Candidate	Votes	%	±%	Expenditures
New Democratic	Philip Toone	12,427	33.76	+26.78	none listed
Bloc Québécois	Daniel Côté	11,650	31.64	−8.46	$39,768.78
Conservative	Régent Bastien	6,292	17.09	−5.75	$48,704.71
Liberal	Jules Duguay	5,533	15.03	−11.93	none listed
Green	Julien Leblanc	913	2.48	−0.63	$328.10
Total valid votes/expense limit		36,815	100.0		$90,208.08
Total rejected, unmarked and declined ballots		571	1.53	+0.33	
Turnout		37,386	53.85	−0.26	
Eligible voters		69,429			
New Democratic gain from Bloc Québécois		Swing		+17.62	

2004 Canadian federal election: Gaspésie—Îles-de-la-Madeleine
Party	Candidate	Votes	%	±%	Expenditures
Bloc Québécois	Raynald Blais	21,446	55.67	+13.10	$44,886.71
Liberal	Georges Farrah	12,579	32.65	−20.15	$44,503.86
Conservative	Guy De Coste	2,636	6.84	+4.17	$12,110.72
Green	Bob Eichenberger	1,060	2.75	–	none listed
New Democratic	Philip Toone	805	2.09	+0.13	$1,695.37
Total valid votes/expense limit		38,526	100.00		$79,194
Total rejected, unmarked and declined ballots		559	1.43		
Turnout		39,085	56.57	−5.93	
Eligible voters		69,089			
Bloc Québécois notional gain from Liberal		Swing		+16.62	

2000 Canadian federal election: Champlain
Party	Candidate	Votes
Bloc Québécois	Marcel Gagnon	20,423
Liberal	Julie Boulet	20,408
Alberta Alliance	Eric Labranche	2,588
Marijuana	Paul Giroux	1,020
New Democratic	Philip Toone	672
