= Hormisdas Langlais =

Canadian politician

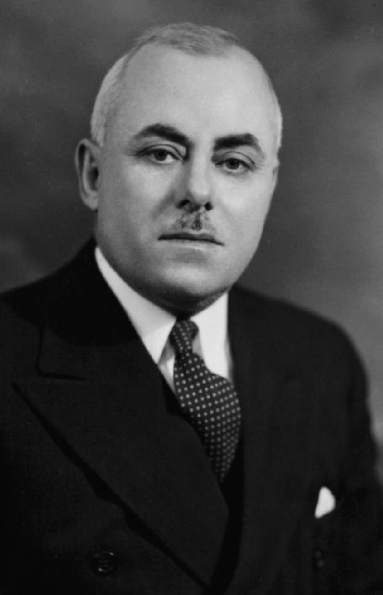

Member of the Legislative Assembly of Quebec for Îles-de-la-Madeleine
- In office 1936–1962
- Preceded by: Amédée Caron
- Succeeded by: Louis-Philippe Lacroix

Personal details
- Born: September 2, 1890 Saint-Octave-de-Métis, Quebec
- Died: April 6, 1976 (aged 85) Quebec City, Quebec
- Party: Union Nationale

Hormisdas Langlais was a Canadian politician and a seven-term Member of the Legislative Assembly of Quebec. He was born on September 2, 1890, in Saint-Octave-de-Métis, Bas-Saint-Laurent.

Langlais ran as an Action libérale nationale (ALN) candidate in the 1935 election and lost. He was elected as a Union Nationale candidate in the 1936 election against Liberal incumbent Amédée Caron in the provincial district of Îles-de-la-Madeleine. He was re-elected in the 1939, 1944, 1948, 1952, 1956 and 1960 elections.

He was appointed House Whip in 1944 and served as a parliamentary assistant from 1955 to 1960. He was defeated against Liberal candidate Louis-Philippe Lacroix in the 1962 election.

Langlais died on April 6, 1976, in Quebec City.
