= Jeannine Richard =

Canadian politician

MNA for Îles-de-la-Madeleine
- In office 2012–2014
- Preceded by: Germain Chevarie
- Succeeded by: Germain Chevarie

Personal details
- Party: Parti Québécois

Jeannine Richard is a Canadian politician. She was a member of the National Assembly of Quebec for the riding of Îles-de-la-Madeleine, first elected in the 2012 election. She was defeated in the 2014 election.
