= Maxime Arseneau =

Canadian politician

MNA for Îles-de-la-Madeleine
- In office 15 December 1998 – 5 November 2008
- Preceded by: Georges Farrah
- Succeeded by: Germain Chevarie

Personal details
- Born: 24 November 1949 (age 76) Havre-aux-Maisons (Village), Quebec, Canada
- Party: Parti Québécois
- Profession: radio host, teacher

Maxime Arseneau (born 24 November 1949) is a Canadian radio host and teacher and former Quebec politician. He was the Member of National Assembly of Quebec for the riding of Îles-de-la-Madeleine. He represents the Parti Québécois and was a former minister in the cabinets of Former Premiers Lucien Bouchard and Bernard Landry. Arseneau served as MNA from 1998 to 2008.

Born in Havre-aux-Maisons (Village), Quebec, Arseneau went at the Université de Montréal and obtained a bachelor's degree in history and later received a certificate in science education at the Université du Québec à Montréal in 1979. He then became a history and economics teacher for nearly 15 years. He was later an assistant director in the Department of Continuing Education at the Cégep de la Gaspésie et des Îles for 10 years.

He would also host a show at CFIM, a community radio station and would be active in politics being the president of the Parti Québécois in the Îles-de-la-Madeleine region twice, while he was the vice-president of the YES committee in the 1995 referendum.

Arseneau was first elected as an MNA for Îles-de-la-Madeleine in 1998 and was named the delegate minister for tourism and the minister responsible for the Gaspésie-Îles-de-la-Madeleine region. After Bernard Landry replaced Lucien Bouchard as Premier of Quebec, Arseneau was named in 2001 the minister of agriculture, fisheries and food. Arseneau was re-elected in 2003 and 2007. He was the PQ's critic in agriculture, fisheries and food. He did not seek re-election in the 2008 provincial elections.

Political offices
| Preceded by Remy Trudel | Minister of Agriculture, Fisheries and Food; 2001–2003 | Succeeded by Yvon Vallieres |
| Preceded by David Cliche | Minister of Tourism; 1998–2001 | Succeeded by Richard Legendre |
