= Germain Chevarie =

Canadian politician

Member of the National Assembly of Quebec for Îles-de-la-Madeleine
- In office December 8, 2008 – September 4, 2012
- Preceded by: Maxime Arseneau
- Succeeded by: Jeannine Richard
- In office April 7, 2014 – August 29, 2018
- Preceded by: Jeannine Richard
- Succeeded by: Joël Arseneau

Personal details
- Born: September 10, 1952 (age 73) Magdalen Islands, Quebec
- Party: Quebec Liberal Party

Germain Chevarie (born 10 September 1952) is a Canadian politician, who was elected to the National Assembly of Quebec for the riding of Îles-de-la-Madeleine in the 2008 provincial election. He was defeated in the 2012 election by Jeannine Richard of the Parti Québécois, but defeated Richard again in the 2014 election. He is a member of the Quebec Liberal Party.

Prior to his election to the assembly, Chevarie was the manager of health services for the Magdalen Islands and works at the region's Health and Social Services centres and the CLSC. He obtained a bachelor's degree in social sciences from the University of Moncton and a second cycle (master's) degree at Laval University in organizational management and development. He also obtained a master's degree in public administration at the ENAP in Montreal.
