= Patrick Gagnon =

Canadian politician

Patrick C. Gagnon
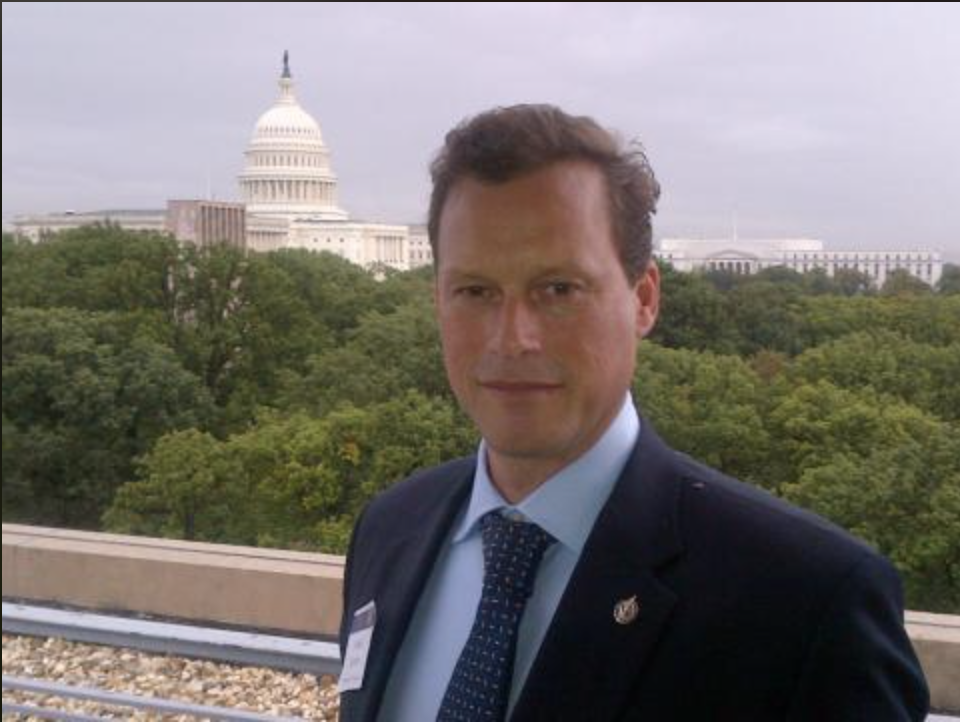
- Patrick C. Gagnon at Washington DC
- Born: February 12, 1962 (age 64); New Richmond, Quebec
- Education: McGill University
- Occupation: Founder of The Parliamentary Group / PARLGROUP
- Known for: Member of the House of Commons, Founder of The Parliamentary Group / PARLGROUP
- Children: 1
- Website: www.parlgroup.com

Patrick Cluny Gagnon is a former member of the House of Commons of Canada. His career has been in international business consulting and government relations.

== Early life ==
Gagnon holds a degree in political science from McGill University and studied literature and international politics at the Sorbonne.

== Political career ==
He was elected in the Bonaventure—Îles-de-la-Madeleine electoral district under the Liberal party in the 1993 federal election, thus he served in the 35th Canadian Parliament. During that time he served as Parliamentary Secretary to the Solicitor General of Canada, Herb Gray (Gray subsequently became Deputy Prime Minister). He was also co-chair of the Joint Senate–House of Commons Committee on Official Languages. His committee work included the Standing Committee on Human Resources Development, the Standing Committee on Agriculture and Agri-Food, the Standing Committee on Justice and the National Security Sub-Committee. He also served on the Special Task Force on Aquaculture, the Ministerial Task Force on Youth and the Ministerial Task Force on the Future of Canadian National Railway.

Gagnon was defeated (179 votes) by the incumbent MP for Gaspé, Yvan Bernier of the Bloc Québécois, in the 1997 federal election in the restructured riding of Bonaventure—Gaspé—Îles-de-la-Madeleine—Pabok.

== Post political career ==
In 2004, he founded the pan-Canadian federal/provincial government relations firm The Parliamentary Group, later rebranded as PARLGROUP, with other former Canadian MPs Deborah Grey, Val Meredith, John Nunziata and Lorne Nystrom.

He is a member of The Rideau Club and served on the board of the Canadian Association of Former Parliamentarians and the Institute for Public Affairs of Montreal.

Gagnon is the managing partner of PARLGROUP , a federal-provincial government relations firm composed of former Members of Parliament and high-level civil servants. The firm serves international and Canadian clients in matters of procurement, finance, pharmaceuticals, defence, engineering and the natural resources sectors, amongst others.
