= François Lapointe (politician) =

Canadian politician (born 1971)

Shadow Minister for Small Business and Tourism
- In office April 19, 2012 – August 12, 2013
- Leader: Thomas Mulcair
- Preceded by: Raymond Côté
- Succeeded by: Glenn Thibeault

Member of Parliament for Montmagny—L'Islet—Kamouraska—Rivière-du-Loup
- In office May 2, 2011 – October 19, 2015
- Preceded by: Bernard Généreux
- Succeeded by: Bernard Généreux

Personal details
- Born: March 26, 1971 (age 55) L'Islet, Quebec
- Party: Liberal Party (2021–present)
- Other political affiliations: New Democratic Party (2011-2016)

François Lapointe (born March 26, 1971) is a Canadian politician who served as MP for the electoral district of Montmagny—L'Islet—Kamouraska—Rivière-du-Loup. He was defeated in the 2015 election.

On the night of the 2011 election, Lapointe was initially declared unsuccessful in his riding, losing narrowly to incumbent MP Bernard Généreux. However, Lapointe was subsequently declared elected on May 5, 2011, after the riding's returning officer determined that 100 votes for Lapointe were reportedly allocated in error to the Green Party candidate in the initial tally.

In the updated count, Lapointe won over Généreux by a margin of just five votes. Following an automatic judicial recount, Lapointe's victory was confirmed.

Lapointe ran in a by-election in Montmagny—L'Islet—Kamouraska—Rivière-du-Loup in 2009, but finished a distant fourth. Lapointe was nominated as the Liberal candidate in the riding for the 2021 federal election, but came in third.

== Electoral record ==
2021 Canadian federal election: Montmagny—L'Islet—Kamouraska—Rivière-du-Loup
Party	Candidate	Votes	%	±%	Expenditures
Conservative	Bernard Généreux	24,118	50.46	+8.80	$57,587.54
Bloc Québécois	Simon Bérubé	12,523	26.20	-6.07	$0.00
Liberal	François Lapointe	8,371	17.51	+1.22	$18,377.55
New Democratic	Sean English	1,597	3.34	-3.57	$181.66
Free	Nancy Rochon	919	1.92	–	$806.33
Rhinoceros	Thibaud Mony	269	0.56	–	$0.00
Total valid votes/expense limit		47,797	–	–	$110,137.98
Total rejected ballots					
Turnout			60.86	-4.69	
Eligible voters		78,533			
Conservative hold		Swing		+7.44	
Source: Elections Canada

2015 Canadian federal election: Montmagny—L'Islet—Kamouraska—Rivière-du-Loup
Party	Candidate	Votes	%	±%	Expenditures
Conservative	Bernard Généreux	14,274	29.0%	–	–
Liberal	Marie-Josée Normand	14,002	28.4%	–	–
New Democratic	François Lapointe	11,918	24.2%	–	–
Bloc Québécois	Louis Gagnon	7,939	16.1%	–	–
Green	Chantal Breton	823	1.7%	–	–
Rhinoceros	Bien Gras Gagné	287	0.6%	–	–
Total valid votes/Expense limit		49,243	100.0		$212,731.62
Total rejected ballots		777	–	–	
Turnout		50,020	–	–	
Eligible voters		78,489			
These results were subject to a judicial recount, and modified from the validated results in accordance with the Judge's rulings. The margin of Bernard Généreux over Marie-Josée Normand increased from 269 votes to 272 votes as a result of the recount.
Source: Elections Canada

2011 Canadian federal election
Party	Candidate	Votes	%	±%	Expenditures
New Democratic	François Lapointe	17,285	36.4	-	
Conservative	Bernard Généreux	17,276	36.3	-	
Bloc Québécois	Nathalie Arsenault	9,550	20.1	-	
Liberal	Andrew Caddell	2,743	5.8	-	
Green	Lynette Tremblay	691	1.5	-	
Total valid votes/Expense limit		47,545	100.00%		

Source: Elections Canada, 2011 General Election, Montmagny--L'Islet--Kamouraska--Rivière-du-Loup, Results certified by judicial recount

By-election on November 9, 2009 resignation of Paul Crête
Party	Candidate	Votes	%	±%
Conservative	Bernard Généreux	12,162	42.7%	
Bloc Québécois	Nancy Gagnon	10,737	37.7%	
Liberal	Marcel Catellier	3,768	13.2%	
New Democratic	François Lapointe	1,363	4.8%	
Green	Charles Marois	472	1.7%	
Total valid votes		28,502		
Total rejected ballots		–		
Turnout		28,502	36.6%	
