= Kamouraska—Rivière-du-Loup—Témiscouata—Les Basques =

Former federal electoral district in Quebec, Canada

Quebec electoral district

Defunct federal electoral district
- Legislature: House of Commons
- District created: 1996
- District abolished: 2003
- First contested: 1997
- Last contested: 2000

Kamouraska—Rivière-du-Loup—Témiscouata—Les-Basques (French pronunciation: [kamuʁaska ʁivjɛʁ dy lu temiskwata le bask]; formerly known as Kamouraska—Rivière-du-Loup—Témiscouata) was a federal electoral district in Quebec, Canada, that was represented in the House of Commons of Canada from 1997 to 2004.

This riding was created in 1996 as "Kamouraska—Rivière-du-Loup—Témiscouata" from parts of Kamouraska—Rivière-du-Loup riding. Its name was changed in 1997 to "Kamouraska—Rivière-du-Loup—Témiscouata—Les Basques".

It consisted of:

- the cities of Cabano, Dégelis, La Pocatière, Notre-Dame-du-Lac, Pohénégamook, Rivière-du-Loup, Saint-Pascal and Trois-Pistoles;
- the County Regional Municipality of Rivière-du-Loup, including Cacouna Indian Reserve No. 22 and Whitworth Indian Reserve; and
- the county regional municipalities of Kamouraska, Les Basques and Témiscouata.

It was abolished in 2003 when it was redistributed into Rivière-du-Loup—Montmagny and Rimouski-Neigette—Témiscouata—Les Basques ridings. Its only Member of Parliament was Paul Crête of the Bloc Québécois.

== Members of Parliament ==
Parliament	Years	Member	Party
Kamouraska—Rivière-du-Loup—Témiscouata—Les Basques; Riding created from Kamouraska—Rivière-du-Loup
36th	1997–2000	Paul Crête	Bloc Québécois
37th	2000–2004	Paul Crête	Bloc Québécois
Riding dissolved into Rivière-du-Loup—Montmagny and Rimouski-Neigette—Témiscouata—Les Basques

== Election results ==
1997 Canadian federal election
Party	Candidate	Votes
Bloc Québécois	Paul Crête	16,518
Liberal	France Dionne	14,119
Progressive Conservative	André Plourde	11,623
Natural Law	Armand Pouliot	480
New Democratic	Élaine Côté	420

2000 Canadian federal election
Party	Candidate	Votes
Bloc Québécois	Paul Crête	23,319
Liberal	Helen Ouellet	11,794
Progressive Conservative	André Plourde	1,382
Alliance	René Théberge	1,373
New Democratic	Elaine Côté	836
Marxist–Leninist	Normand Fournier	170

== See also ==
- List of Canadian electoral districts
- Historical federal electoral districts of Canada
