= André Plourde =

Canadian politician (born 1937)

Member of Parliament for Kamouraska—Rivière-du-Loup
- In office 1984–1993
- Preceded by: Rosaire Gendron
- Succeeded by: Paul Crête

Personal details
- Born: 12 January 1937 (age 89) Rivière-du-Loup, Quebec
- Party: Progressive Conservative
- Profession: businessperson, industrialist

André Plourde (born 12 January 1937 in Rivière-du-Loup, Quebec) was a Progressive Conservative member of the House of Commons of Canada. He was a businessman and industrialist by career.

He represented the Quebec riding of Kamouraska—Rivière-du-Loup where he was first elected in the 1984 federal election and re-elected in 1988, therefore becoming a member in the 33rd and 34th Canadian Parliaments.

Plourde was defeated by Paul Crête of the Bloc Québécois in the 1993 federal election, ending his federal political service. He made another unsuccessful attempt to return to Parliament in the 1997 federal election at the Kamouraska—Rivière-du-Loup—Témiscouata—Les Basques riding.
