= Bonaventure—Gaspé—Îles-de-la-Madeleine—Pabok =

Former federal electoral district in Quebec, Canada

Quebec electoral district

Defunct federal electoral district
- Legislature: House of Commons
- District created: 1996
- District abolished: 2003
- First contested: 1997
- Last contested: 2000

Bonaventure—Gaspé—Îles-de-la-Madeleine—Pabok (formerly known as Gaspé—Bonaventure—Îles-de-la-Madeleine) was a federal electoral district in Quebec, Canada, that was represented in the House of Commons of Canada from 1997 to 2004.

It was created in 1996 as "Gaspé—Bonaventure—Îles-de-la-Madeleine" riding from Bonaventure—Îles-de-la-Madeleine and Gaspé ridings. It was abolished in 2003 when it was merged into Gaspésie—Îles-de-la-Madeleine.

The district consisted of the cities of Chandler, Gaspé, Grande-Rivière, Murdochville, New Richmond and Percé, and the Regional County Municipalities of Bonaventure, La Côte-de-Gaspé, Les Îles-de-la-Madeleine and Pabok.

== Members of Parliament ==
This riding elected the following members of Parliament:

Parliament	Years	Member	Party
Bonaventure—Gaspé—Îles-de-la-Madeleine—Pabok; Riding created from Bonaventure—Îles-de-la-Madeleine and Gaspé
36th	1997–2000	Yvan Bernier	Bloc Québécois
37th	2000–2004	Georges Farrah	Liberal
Riding dissolved into Gaspésie—Îles-de-la-Madeleine

The riding was one of the more federalist in eastern Quebec. Bernier only narrowly won in 1997 over Patrick Gagnon of the Liberals, and did not run again in 2000. Farrah won the open seat handily.

== Election results ==
1997 Canadian federal election
Party	Candidate	Votes	%
Bloc Québécois	Yvan Bernier	15,983	41.26
Liberal	Patrick Gagnon	15,804	40.80
Progressive Conservative	Yves Quinton	6,297	16.26
New Democratic	Dennis P. Drainville	649	1.68
Turnout		38,733	100.00

2000 Canadian federal election
Party	Candidate	Votes	%	±%
Liberal	Georges Farrah	19,213	53.19	+12.39
Bloc Québécois	Raynald Blais	15,532	43.00	+1.74
Alliance	Linda Fournier	764	2.12	-
New Democratic	Fred Kraenzel	613	1.70	+0.02
Turnout		36,112	100.00	

== See also ==
- List of Canadian electoral districts
- Historical federal electoral districts of Canada
