= Bernard Généreux =

Canadian politician (born 1962)

Bernard Généreux MP
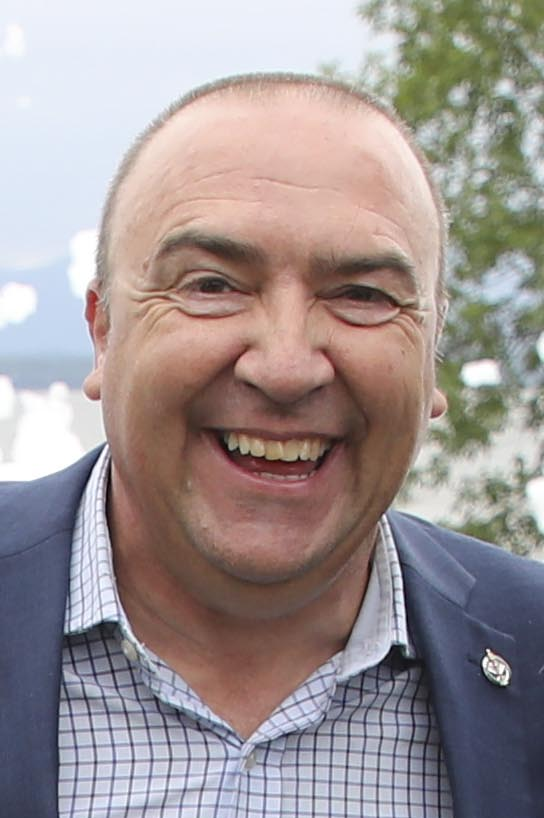
- Généreux in 2018

Member of Parliament for Côte-du-Sud—Rivière-du-Loup—Kataskomiq—Témiscouata Montmagny—L'Islet—Kamouraska—Rivière-du-Loup (2009–2025)
- Incumbent
- Assumed office October 19, 2015
- Preceded by: François Lapointe
- In office November 9, 2009 – May 2, 2011
- Preceded by: Paul Crête
- Succeeded by: François Lapointe

Mayor of La Pocatière
- In office 2005–2009
- Preceded by: André Théberge
- Succeeded by: Sylvain Hudon

Personal details
- Born: April 23, 1962 (age 64) La Pocatière, Quebec, Canada
- Party: Conservative
- Spouse: Tracey Haw
- Children: 2
- Profession: Entrepreneur
- Source: BernardGenereux.ca (French)

Bernard Généreux MP (French pronunciation: [bɛʁnaʁ ʒeneʁø]; born April 23, 1962) is a Canadian politician who was elected to represent the riding of Montmagny—L'Islet—Kamouraska—Rivière-du-Loup in the House of Commons in the federal by-elections on November 9, 2009. He is a member of the Conservative Party.

Prior to his election, Généreux served as Mayor of La Pocatière. He was initially declared reelected in his riding in the 2011 election, but it was announced on May 5, 2011, that verification of the polling station tallies had given the riding to his New Democratic Party opponent François Lapointe by just five votes, after 110 votes for Lapointe were reportedly allocated in error to the Green Party candidate on election night. Following a judicial recount, Lapointe was declared elected. Généreux was again a candidate for the 2015 election, where he won with over 200 votes. He was re-elected in the 2019 federal election.

At the time of the 2025 Canadian federal election, he lived in Saint-Roch-des-Aulnaies.

In June 2026, Généreux suffered a heart problem during a meeting of the Québec Conservative caucus. He was transferred to hospital via ambulance.

== Electoral record ==
2025 Canadian federal election: Côte-du-Sud—Rivière-du-Loup—Kataskomiq—Témiscouata
Party	Candidate	Votes	%	±%	Expenditures
Conservative	Bernard Généreux	28,873	45.84	+0.95	$74,118.29
Liberal	Rémi Massé	19,097	30.32	+11.26	$32,782.51
Bloc Québécois	Diane Sénécal	12,598	20.00	–9.81	$21,576.29
New Democratic	Iseult L'Heureux Hubert	1,072	1.70	–1.68	$0.00
Green	Alexie Plourde	682	1.08	N/A	$0.00
People's	Jean-François Morin	464	0.74	+0.38	$1,392.56
Rhinoceros	Thibaud Mony	206	0.33	–0.20	$0.00
Total valid votes/expense limit		62,992	98.49	+0.48	$147,384.97
Total rejected ballots		967	1.51	-0.48	
Turnout		63,959	66.80	+5.28	
Eligible voters		95,745			
Conservative notional hold		Swing		-5.16	
Source: Elections Canada
Note: number of eligible voters does not include voting day registrations.

2021 Canadian federal election: Montmagny—L'Islet—Kamouraska—Rivière-du-Loup
Party	Candidate	Votes	%	±%	Expenditures
Conservative	Bernard Généreux	24,118	50.46	+8.80	$57,587.54
Bloc Québécois	Simon Bérubé	12,523	26.20	-6.07	$0.00
Liberal	François Lapointe	8,371	17.51	+1.22	$18,377.55
New Democratic	Sean English	1,597	3.34	-3.57	$181.66
Free	Nancy Rochon	919	1.92	–	$806.33
Rhinoceros	Thibaud Mony	269	0.56	–	$0.00
Total valid votes/expense limit		47,797	–	–	$110,137.98
Total rejected ballots					
Turnout			60.86	-4.69	
Eligible voters		78,533			
Conservative hold		Swing		+7.44	
Source: Elections Canada

2019 Canadian federal election: Montmagny—L'Islet—Kamouraska—Rivière-du-Loup
Party	Candidate	Votes	%	±%	Expenditures
Conservative	Bernard Généreux	20,989	41.65	+11.66	$60,089.97
Bloc Québécois	Louis Gagnon	16,261	32.27	+16.15	$19,069.27
Liberal	Aladin Legault d'Auteuil	8,210	16.29	-12.14	none listed
New Democratic	Hugo Latulippe	3,481	6.91	-17.29	none listed
Green	Denis Ducharme	1,030	2.04	+0.37	none listed
People's	Serge Haché	417	0.83	-	none listed
Total valid votes/expense limit		50,388	98.10		
Total rejected ballots		976	1.90		
Turnout		51,364	65.46		
Eligible voters		78,461			
Conservative hold		Swing		-1.74	
Source: Elections Canada

2015 Canadian federal election: Montmagny—L'Islet—Kamouraska—Rivière-du-Loup
Party	Candidate	Votes	%	±%	Expenditures
Conservative	Bernard Généreux	14,274	28.99	-7.35	$77,412.02
Liberal	Marie-Josée Normand	14,002	28.43	+22.66	$14,137.69
New Democratic	François Lapointe	11,918	24.20	-12.16	$42,243.41
Bloc Québécois	Louis Gagnon	7,939	16.12	-3.97	$23,835.49
Green	Chantal Breton	823	1.67	+0.22	–
Rhinoceros	Bien Gras Gagné	287	0.58	–	–
Total valid votes/Expense limit		49,243	100.0		$212,861.18
Total rejected ballots		777	1.50	+0.10	
Turnout		50,020	63.72	+2.66	
Eligible voters		78,489			
Conservative gain from New Democratic		Swing		+4.81	
These results were subject to a judicial recount, and modified from the validated results in accordance with the Judge's rulings. The margin of Bernard Généreux over Marie-Josée Normand increased from 269 votes to 272 votes as a result of the recount.
Source: Elections Canada

2011 Canadian federal election: Montmagny—L'Islet—Kamouraska—Rivière-du-Loup
Party	Candidate	Votes	%	±%	Expenditures
New Democratic	François Lapointe	17,285	36.36	+31.58	$1,995.19
Conservative	Bernard Généreux	17,276	36.34	-6.33	$79,493.77
Bloc Québécois	Nathalie Arsenault	9,550	20.09	-17.58	$66,461.89
Liberal	Andrew Caddell	2,743	5.77	-7.55	$11,840.48
Green	Lynette Tremblay	691	1.45	-0.21	none listed
Total valid votes/Expense limit		47,545	100.0		$87,227.52
Total rejected, unmarked and declined ballots		677	1.40	+0.48	
Turnout		48,222	61.06	+24.13	
Eligible voters		78,969			
New Democratic gain from Conservative		Swing		+18.96	
This vote was subject to mandatory judicial recount due to the margin of win being less than 1/1000 of the total votes. The validated results resulted in Lapointe's victory by a margin of 5 votes. After the recount by a judge, M. Lapointe was confirmed the winner on 13 May 2011, this time by a margin of 9 votes. Changes are based on results from the 2009 by-election.

Canadian federal by-election, November 9, 2009: Montmagny—L'Islet—Kamouraska—Rivière-du-Loup
Party	Candidate	Votes	%	±%	Expenditures
Conservative	Bernard Généreux	12,162	42.67	+12.03	$85,278.26
Bloc Québécois	Nancy Gagnon	10,737	37.67	-8.36	$74,821.57
Liberal	Marcel Catellier	3,768	13.22	-2.13	$28,252.66
New Democratic	François Lapointe	1,363	4.78	-0.67	$24,823.51
Green	Charles Marois	472	1.66	-0.54	none listed
Total valid votes		28,502	100.0		$86,257
Total rejected, unmarked and declined ballots		264	0.92	-0.27	
Turnout		28,766	36.93	-20.56	
Eligible voters		77,877			
Conservative gain from Bloc Québécois		Swing		+10.20	
By-election due to the resignation of Paul Crête
