= Diane Lebouthillier =

Canadian politician (born 1959)

The Honourable Diane Lebouthillier PC
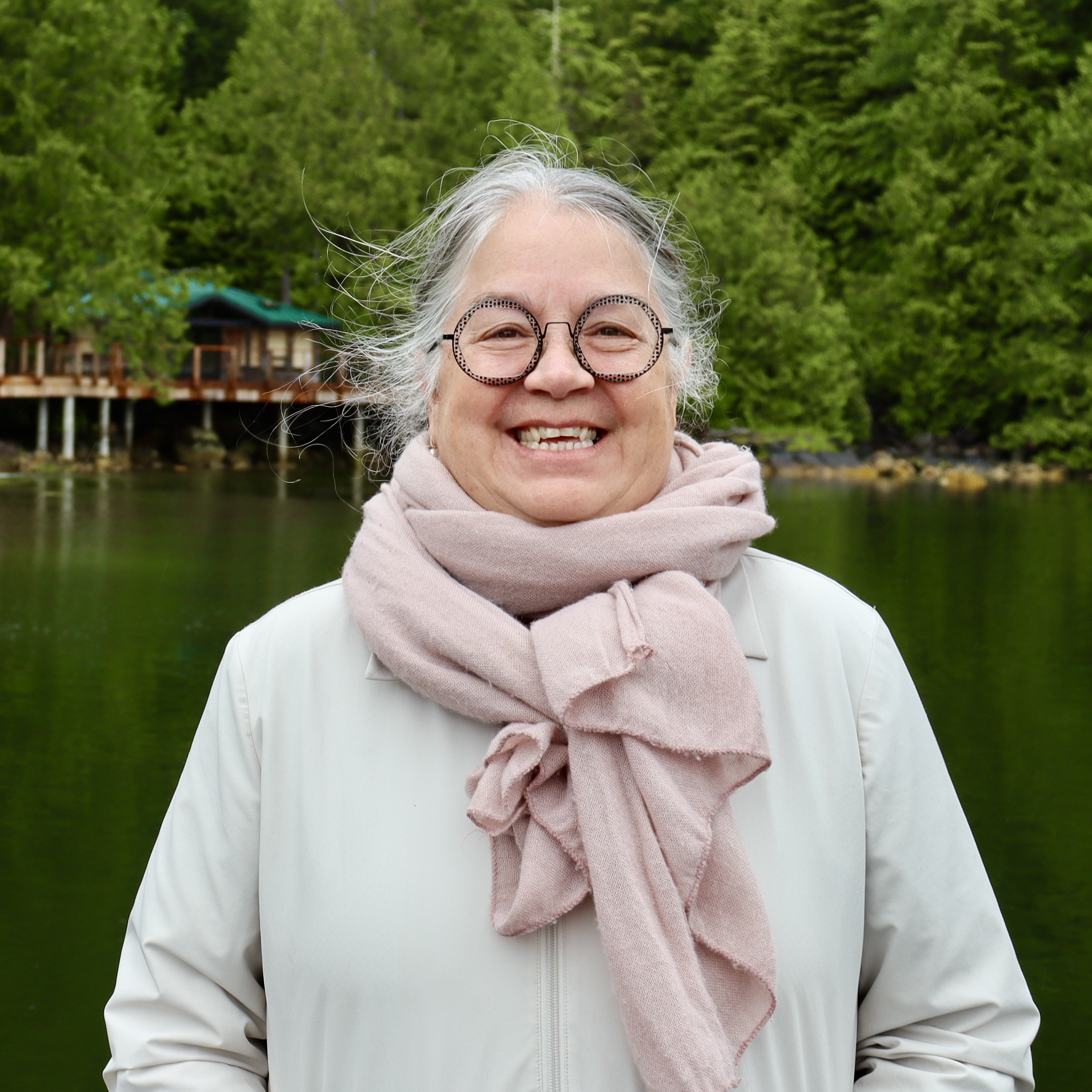
- Lebouthillier in 2024

Minister of Fisheries, Oceans and the Canadian Coast Guard
- In office July 26, 2023 – March 14, 2025
- Prime Minister: Justin Trudeau
- Preceded by: Joyce Murray
- Succeeded by: Joanne Thompson

Minister of National Revenue
- In office November 4, 2015 – July 26, 2023
- Prime Minister: Justin Trudeau
- Preceded by: Kerry-Lynne Findlay
- Succeeded by: Marie-Claude Bibeau

Member of Parliament for Gaspésie—Les Îles-de-la-Madeleine
- In office October 19, 2015 – March 23, 2025
- Preceded by: Philip Toone
- Succeeded by: Alexis Deschênes

Personal details
- Born: February 5, 1959 (age 67) Newport, Quebec, Canada
- Party: Liberal
- Education: Université de Moncton
- Profession: Social worker

Diane Lebouthillier (/diˈæn ləˌbuːtɪˈlɪər/; French: [djan ləbutije]; born February 5, 1959) is a Canadian politician who served as Minister of National Revenue from 2015 to 2023 and Minister of Fisheries, Oceans and the Canadian Coast Guard from 2023 to 2025. A member of the Liberal Party, she was elected to the House of Commons in the 2015 federal election and represented the riding of Gaspésie—Les Îles-de-la-Madeleine for ten years. She was unseated by the Bloc Québécois candidate Alexis Deschênes in the 2025 election.

== Background ==
Lebouthillier's parents were born in the city of Gaspé, and they returned when she was four. She graduated with a bachelor's degree in social work from the Université de Moncton. Prior to her career in politics, she was a local social worker, managing clients out of the CLSC (provincial community clinic) in Chandler. She worked with long-time Member of the National Assembly (MNA) Georges Mamelonet on social service issues in the region. She is a mother of three sons and has two grandsons.

== Political career ==
=== Municipal politics ===
Lebouthillier was elected in 2010 as the Prefect of Le Rocher-Percé Regional County Municipality.

=== Federal politics ===
Lebouthillier was elected in the riding of Gaspésie—Les Îles-de-la-Madeleine during the 2015 federal election. She was appointed Minister of National Revenue in the federal Cabinet, headed by Justin Trudeau, on November 4, 2015. She was re-elected in the 2019 and 2021 federal elections.

On July 26, 2023, Lebouthillier was appointed Minister of Fisheries, Oceans, and the Canadian Coast Guard. In 2025, she was dropped from cabinet when Mark Carney formed the 30th Canadian Ministry.

In the 2025 federal election Lebouthillier was unseated by Bloc Québécois candidate Alexis Deschênes.

== Electoral record ==
2025 Canadian federal election: Gaspésie—Les Îles-de-la-Madeleine—Listuguj
Party	Candidate	Votes	%	±%	Expenditures
Bloc Québécois	Alexis Deschênes	26,091	45.79	+1.45	$29,098.29
Liberal	Diane Lebouthillier	21,817	38.29	–1.47	$90,115.33
Conservative	Jean-Pierre Pigeon	7,047	12.37	+4.11	$1,850.29
New Democratic	Denise Giroux	1,005	1.76	–2.51	$0.00
Rhinoceros	Shawn Grenier	572	1.00	N/A	$0.00
People's	Christian Rioux	452	0.79	–1.22	$1,566.13
Total valid votes/expense limit		56,984	98.54	–	$153,917.81
Total rejected ballots		845	1.46		
Turnout		57,829	60.48		
Eligible voters		95,615			
Bloc Québécois notional hold		Swing		+1.46	
Source: Elections Canada
Note: number of eligible voters does not include voting day registrations.

2021 Canadian federal election: Gaspésie—Les Îles-de-la-Madeleine
Party	Candidate	Votes	%	±%	Expenditures
Liberal	Diane Lebouthillier	17,099	46.4	+3.9	$82,566.31
Bloc Québécois	Guy Bernatchez	14,481	39.3	-1.5	$12,869.61
Conservative	Jean-Pierre Pigeon	3,010	8.2	+0.3	$9,458.03
New Democratic	Lisa Phung	1,358	3.7	-0.8	$744.35
People's	Christian Rioux	621	1.7	+1.2	$995.81
Free	Monique Leduc	289	0.8	N/A	$1,116.77
Total valid votes/expense limit		36,858	97.9	–	$112,788.79
Total rejected ballots		778	2.1		
Turnout		37,636	57.5		
Registered voters		65,501			
Liberal hold		Swing		+2.7	
Source: Elections Canada

2019 Canadian federal election: Gaspésie—Les Îles-de-la-Madeleine
Party	Candidate	Votes	%	±%	Expenditures
Liberal	Diane Lebouthillier	16,296	42.5	+3.8	$53,469.21
Bloc Québécois	Guy Bernatchez	15,659	40.8	+19.9	none listed
Conservative	Jean-Pierre Pigeon	3,022	7.9	+1.8	$9,786.76
New Democratic	Lynn Beaulieu	1,722	4.5	-28.0	none listed
Green	Dennis Drainville	1,130	2.9	+1.9	none listed
Rhinoceros	Jay Cowboy	353	0.9	+0.1	$0.00
People's	Eric Hébert	198	0.5		$2,821.16
Total valid votes/expense limit		38,380	100.0		
Total rejected ballots		783			
Turnout		39,163	60.5		
Eligible voters		64,748			
Liberal hold		Swing		-8.05	
Source: Elections Canada and CBC

2015 Canadian federal election: Gaspésie—Les Îles-de-la-Madeleine
Party	Candidate	Votes	%	±%	Expenditures
Liberal	Diane Lebouthillier	15,345	38.73	+21.69	$34,217.07
New Democratic	Philip Toone	12,885	32.52	+3.69	$45,644.59
Bloc Québécois	Nicholas Roussy	8,289	20.92	-12.15	$51,177.09
Conservative	Jean-Pierre Pigeon	2,398	6.05	-13.02	$9,215.28
Green	Jim Morrison	400	1.01	-0.98	–
Rhinoceros	Max Boudreau	300	0.76	–	–
Total valid votes/expense limit		39,617	100.0		$215,809.52
Total rejected ballots		395	–	–	
Turnout		40,012	60.97	–	
Eligible voters		65,623			
Source: Elections Canada

29th Canadian Ministry (2015–2025) – Cabinet of Justin Trudeau
Cabinet posts (2)
Predecessor	Office	Successor
Joyce Murray	Minister of Fisheries, Oceans and the Canadian Coast Guard; 2023–2025	Joanne Thompson
Kerry-Lynne Findlay	Minister of National Revenue; 2015–2023	Marie-Claude Bibeau
