= Kamouraska—Rivière-du-Loup =

Former federal electoral district in Quebec, Canada

Quebec electoral district

Defunct federal electoral district
- Legislature: House of Commons
- District created: 1976
- District abolished: 1996
- First contested: 1979
- Last contested: 1993

Kamouraska—Rivière-du-Loup (French pronunciation: [kamuʁaska ʁivjɛʁ dy lu]) was a federal electoral district in Quebec, Canada, that was represented in the House of Commons of Canada from 1979 to 1997.

This riding was created in 1976 from parts of Kamouraska and Rivière-du-Loup—Témiscouata ridings. It was abolished in 1996, and redistributed between Kamouraska—Rivière-du-Loup—Témiscouata—Les Basques and Bellechasse—Etchemins—Montmagny—L'Islet ridings.

Kamouraska—Rivière-du-Loup consisted of the City of Rivière-du-Loup; the Towns of La Pocatière, Pohénégamook, Saint-Pascal and Trois-Pistoles; the Counties of Kamouraska and Rivière-du-Loup; and the parish municipality of Sainte-Louise and the municipality of Saint-Roch-des-Aulnets in the County of L'Islet.

In 1987, the riding was redefined to consist of the towns of La Pocatière, Pohénégamook, Rivière-du-Loup, Saint-Pascal and Trois-Pistoles; the counties of Kamouraska and Rivière-du-Loup; the Parish Municipality of Sainte-Louise and the Municipality of Saint-Roch-des-Aulnaies in the County of L'Islet; and the parish municipalities of Saint-Mathieu-de-Rioux and Saint-Simon; the municipalities of Saint-Guy and Saint-Médard; the Territory of Rimouski-Lac-Boisbouscache portion in the County of Rimouski.

== Members of Parliament ==
This riding elected the following members of Parliament:

Parliament	Years	Member	Party
Kamouraska—Rivière-du-Loup; Riding created from Kamouraska and Rivière-du-Loup—Témiscouata
31st	1979–1980	Rosaire Gendron	Liberal
32nd	1980–1984	Rosaire Gendron	Liberal
33rd	1984–1988	André Plourde	Progressive Conservative
34th	1988–1993	André Plourde	Progressive Conservative
35th	1993–1997	Paul Crête	Bloc Québécois
Riding dissolved into Kamouraska—Rivière-du-Loup—Témiscouata—Les Basques and Bellechasse—Etchemins—Montmagny—L'Islet

== Election history ==
1979 Canadian federal election
Party	Candidate	Votes
Liberal	Rosaire Gendron	15,328
Social Credit	Charles-Eugène Dionne	12,529
Progressive Conservative	Claude Langlais	5,662
Independent	Jean-Noël Lagacé	515
Rhinoceros	Andrée Constance Lapierre	506
New Democratic	Marc Lord	357

1980 Canadian federal election
Party	Candidate	Votes
Liberal	Rosaire Gendron	19,117
Social Credit	Charles-Eugène Dionne	13,101
Progressive Conservative	Yvan Dionne	1,519
Union populaire	Mario Bédard	414
Rhinoceros	Andrée Constance Lapierre	358
Rhinoceros	Raymond Guay	349

1984 Canadian federal election
Party	Candidate	Votes
Progressive Conservative	André Plourde	19,651
Liberal	Pierre Pettigrew	12,922
Rhinoceros	Gaston La Poule Beaulieu	1,989
New Democratic	Victor Bibaud	1,550
Parti nationaliste	Charles-Aimé Poirier	584
Independent	Jean-Noël Lagacé	233

1988 Canadian federal election
Party	Candidate	Votes
Progressive Conservative	André Plourde	20,388
Liberal	Gilles Desjardins	10,353
New Democratic	Maurice Tremblay	3,257
Green	Marc Corbo Bilodeau	685
No affiliation	Pierre-Paul Malenfant	192

1993 Canadian federal election
Party	Candidate	Votes
Bloc Québécois	Paul Crête	18,510
Progressive Conservative	André Plourde	8,052
Liberal	Maurice Tremblay	7,479
Independent	Pierre-Paul Malenfant	542
New Democratic	Hélène Bois	476

== See also ==
- List of Canadian electoral districts
- Historical federal electoral districts of Canada
