= Raynald Blais =

Canadian politician (1954–2023)

Member of Parliament for Gaspésie—Îles-de-la-Madeleine
- In office June 28, 2004 – May 2, 2011
- Preceded by: Georges Farrah
- Succeeded by: Philip Toone

Personal details
- Born: January 5, 1954 Port-Daniel, Quebec, Canada
- Died: September 26, 2023 (aged 69)
- Party: Bloc Québécois
- Profession: Journalist, political assistant

Raynald Blais (January 5, 1954 – September 26, 2023) was a Canadian politician who represented the district Gaspésie—Îles-de-la-Madeleine in the House of Commons of Canada from 2004 to 2011 as a member of the Bloc Québécois.

== Biography ==
Born in Port-Daniel, Quebec, he was first elected in 2004, but ran in the 2000 Canadian federal election in the riding of Bonaventure—Gaspé—Îles-de-la-Madeleine—Pabok and lost to Georges Farrah of the Liberal Party of Canada. Blais had 15,532 votes. Blais was a former journalist and political assistant.

Blais died on September 26, 2023, at the age of 69.

== Electoral record ==
2008 Canadian federal election: Gaspésie—Îles-de-la-Madeleine
Party	Candidate	Votes	%	±%	Expenditures
Bloc Québécois	Raynald Blais	14,636	40.10	-2.59	$35,057.79
Liberal	Denis Gauvreau	9,840	26.96	+7.70	$75,736.95
Conservative	Darryl Gray	8,334	22.84	-9.39	$61,592.38
New Democratic	Gaston Langlais	2,549	6.98	+4.02	$1,775.37
Green	Julien Leblanc	1,136	3.11	+0.25	$157.00
Total valid votes/Expense limit		36,495	100.0		$86,955
Total rejected, unmarked and declined ballots		445	1.20	+0.07	
Turnout		36,940	54.11	-7.04	
Eligible voters		68,270			
Bloc Québécois hold		Swing		-5.14	

2006 Canadian federal election: Gaspésie—Îles-de-la-Madeleine
Party	Candidate	Votes	%	±%	Expenditures
Bloc Québécois	Raynald Blais	17,678	42.69	-12.98	$39,804.88
Conservative	Gaston Langlais	13,347	32.23	+25.39	$16,170.29
Liberal	Mario Levesque	7,977	19.26	-13.39	$27,785.44
New Democratic	Sophie Dauphinais	1,225	2.96	+0.87	$1,237.16
Green	Bob Eichenberger	1,183	2.86	+0.11	$325.71
Total valid votes/Expense limit		41,410	100.0		$80,993
Total rejected, unmarked and declined ballots		474	1.13	-0.30	
Turnout		41,884	61.15	+4.58	
Eligible voters		68,494			
Bloc Québécois hold		Swing		-19.18	

2004 Canadian federal election: Gaspésie—Îles-de-la-Madeleine
Party	Candidate	Votes	%	±%	Expenditures
Bloc Québécois	Raynald Blais	21,446	55.67	+13.10	$44,886.71
Liberal	Georges Farrah	12,579	32.65	−20.15	$44,503.86
Conservative	Guy De Coste	2,636	6.84	+4.17	$12,110.72
Green	Bob Eichenberger	1,060	2.75	–	none listed
New Democratic	Philip Toone	805	2.09	+0.13	$1,695.37
Total valid votes/expense limit		38,526	100.00		$79,194
Total rejected, unmarked and declined ballots		559	1.43		
Turnout		39,085	56.57	−5.93	
Eligible voters		69,089			
Bloc Québécois notional gain from Liberal		Swing		+16.62	

2000 Canadian federal election: Bonaventure—Gaspé—Îles-de-la-Madeleine—Pabok
Party	Candidate	Votes	%	±%
Liberal	Georges Farrah	19,213	53.19	+12.39
Bloc Québécois	Raynald Blais	15,532	43.00	+1.74
Alliance	Linda Fournier	764	2.12	–
New Democratic	Fred Kraenzel	613	1.70	+0.02
Turnout		36,112	100.00	
