= Darryl Gray =

Canadian politician (born 1946)

Member of Parliament for Bonaventure—Îles-de-la-Madeleine
- In office 1984–1993
- Preceded by: Rémi Bujold
- Succeeded by: Patrick Gagnon

Personal details
- Born: Darryl L. Gray; 29 December 1946 (age 79) Campbellton, New Brunswick, Canada
- Party: Progressive Conservative
- Profession: Farmer, professor

Darryl L. Gray (born 29 December 1946) is a Canadian politician and former Progressive Conservative member of the House of Commons of Canada. He is a farmer and professor by career.

He represented the Quebec riding of Bonaventure—Îles-de-la-Madeleine, where he was first elected in the 1984 federal election and re-elected in 1988, therefore becoming a member in the 33rd and 34th Canadian Parliaments.

== Electoral record ==
2008 Canadian federal election: Gaspésie—Îles-de-la-Madeleine
Party	Candidate	Votes
Bloc Québécois	Raynald Blais	14,636
Liberal	Denis Gauvreau	9,840
Conservative	Darryl Gray	8,334
New Democratic	Gaston Langlais	2,549
Green	Julien Leblanc	1,136

1997 Canadian federal election: Matapédia—Matane
Party	Candidate	Votes
Bloc Québécois	René Canuel	15,694
Liberal	Robert Boulay	10,558
Progressive Conservative	Darryl Gray	7,991
New Democratic	Anny-Jos Paquin	417
Natural Law	Miville Couture	377

1993 Canadian federal election: Bonaventure—Îles-de-la-Madeleine
Party	Candidate	Votes
Liberal	Patrick Gagnon	12,334
Bloc Québécois	Michel Saint-Pierre	9,228
Progressive Conservative	Darryl Gray	6,019
New Democratic	Germaine Poirier	377

1988 Canadian federal election: Bonaventure—Îles-de-la-Madeleine
Party	Candidate	Votes
Progressive Conservative	Darryl Gray	15,491
Liberal	Lyse Routhier	9,296
New Democratic	Germaine Poirier	1,546

1984 Canadian federal election: Bonaventure—Îles-de-la-Madeleine
Party	Candidate	Votes
Progressive Conservative	Darryl Gray	15,502
Liberal	Rémi Bujold	13,689
New Democratic	Martin Cauvier	1,040
Independent	Sylvain Sauvé	440
Commonwealth of Canada	Jacques Bernier	280
