= Georges Farrah =

Canadian politician

The Honourable Georges Farrah PC

Member of the Canadian Parliament for Bonaventure—Gaspé—Îles-de-la-Madeleine—Pabok
- In office November 27, 2000 – June 28, 2004
- Preceded by: Yvan Bernier
- Succeeded by: Raynald Blais

Member of the National Assembly of Quebec for Îles-de-la-Madeleine
- In office December 2, 1985 – November 30, 1998
- Preceded by: Denise Leblanc-Bantey
- Succeeded by: Maxime Arseneau

Personal details
- Born: August 23, 1957 (age 68) Cap-aux-Meules, Quebec, Canada
- Party: Liberal
- Other political affiliations: Quebec Liberal Party

Georges Farrah, PC (born August 23, 1957) is a Canadian politician.

== Background ==
Born in Cap-aux-Meules, Magdalen Islands, Quebec, the son of Arthur Farrah and Hilda Boudreau, he was educated in administration at the University of Moncton.

== Member of the legislature ==
Farrah was first elected to the National Assembly of Quebec as the MNA for Îles-de-la-Madeleine in 1985. He was re-elected twice, served as chief opposition whip following the 1994 elections until his eventual defeat in 1998 to the Parti Québécois candidate Maxime Arseneau.

== Federal politics ==
Farrah was member of the Liberal Party of Canada in the House of Commons of Canada, representing the riding of Bonaventure—Gaspé—Îles-de-la-Madeleine—Pabok from 2000 to 2004. Farrah is a former administrator. Farrah was Parliamentary Secretary to the Minister of Agriculture and Agri-Food with special emphasis on Rural Development, and Parliamentary Secretary to the Minister of Fisheries and Oceans.

He lost his seat in the 2004 election to Bloc Québécois candidate Raynald Blais.
