= Côte-du-Sud—Rivière-du-Loup—Kataskomiq—Témiscouata =

Federal electoral district in Quebec, Canada

Coordinates: 47.47°N 69.60°W

Quebec electoral district
- Interactive map of riding boundaries from the 2025 federal election

Federal electoral district
- Legislature: House of Commons
MP
Bernard Généreux
Conservative
- District created: 2003
- First contested: 2004
- Last contested: 2021
- District webpage: profile, map

Demographics
- Population (2021): 96,724
- Electors (2021): 78,533
- Area (km²): 7,310.10
- Pop. density (per km²): 13.2
- Census division(s): Kamouraska, L'Islet, Montmagny, Rivière-du-Loup, Témiscouata
- Census subdivision(s): Rivière-du-Loup, Montmagny, La Pocatière, Témiscouata-sur-le-Lac, Saint-Antonin, L'Islet, Saint-Pascal, Saint-Jean-Port-Joli, Cap-Saint-Ignace, Dégelis

Côte-du-Sud—Rivière-du-Loup—Kataskomiq—Témiscouata (formerly Montmagny—L'Islet—Kamouraska—Rivière-du-Loup and Rivière-du-Loup—Montmagny) is a federal electoral district in Quebec, Canada, that has been represented in the House of Commons of Canada since 2004. Its population in 2006 was 97,492. It has the highest percentage of Catholics in Canada (97.1%, 2001 Census).

== Geography ==
The district includes the Regional County Municipalities of Kamouraska, L'Islet, Montmagny and Rivière-du-Loup.

The neighbouring ridings are Bellechasse—Les Etchemins—Lévis, Montmorency—Charlevoix, Côte-Nord—Kawawachikamach—Nitassinan, Rimouski-Neigette—Mitis—Matapédia—Les Basques and Madawaska—Restigouche.

== Demographics ==
According to the 2021 Canadian census, 2023 representation order

Race: 97.0% White, 1.6% Indigenous
Languages: 98.7% French
Religions: 83.5% Christian (76.4% Catholic, 7.0% other), 16.0% none
Median income: $37,600 (2020)
Average income: $43,250 (2020)

== History ==
The electoral district was created as "Rivière-du-Loup—Montmagny" in 2003 55.5% from Kamouraska—Rivière-du-Loup—Témiscouata—Les Basques and 44.5% from Bellechasse—Etchemins—Montmagny—L'Islet ridings.

Its name was changed after the 2004 election to "Montmagny—L'Islet—Kamouraska—Rivière-du-Loup". The district did not have any boundary changes as a result of the 2012 federal electoral redistribution.

Following the 2022 Canadian federal electoral redistribution, the riding was largely replaced by Côte-du-Sud—Rivière-du-Loup—Kataskomiq—Témiscouata, gaining the Témiscouata Regional County Municipality from Rimouski-Neigette—Témiscouata—Les Basques in the process.

== Riding associations ==
Riding associations are the local branches of political parties:

Party	Association name	CEO	HQ city
Conservative	Association du Parti conservateur Côte-du-Sud-Rivière-du-Loup-Kataskomiq-Temiscouata	Daniel Gagnon	L'Isle-Verte
Liberal	Association libérale fédérale de Côte-du-Sud-Rivière-du-Loup-Kataskomiq-Témiscouata	Raphaël Crevier	Montréal
New Democratic	Association NPD Côte-du-Sud-Rivière-du-Loup-Kataskomiq-Témiscouata	Duncan Viktor Salvain	Montréal

== Members of Parliament ==
This riding has elected the following members of Parliament:

Parliament	Years	Member	Party
Rivière-du-Loup—Montmagny; Riding created from Bellechasse—Etchemins—Montmagny—L'Islet and Kamouraska—Rivière-du-Loup—Témiscouata—Les Basques
38th	2004–2006	Paul Crête	Bloc Québécois
Montmagny—L'Islet—Kamouraska—Rivière-du-Loup
39th	2006–2008	Paul Crête	Bloc Québécois
40th	2008–2009	Paul Crête	Bloc Québécois
40th	2009–2011	Bernard Généreux	Conservative
41st	2011–2015	François Lapointe	New Democratic
42nd	2015–2019	Bernard Généreux	Conservative
43rd	2019–2021	Bernard Généreux	Conservative
44th	2021–2025	Bernard Généreux	Conservative
Côte-du-Sud—Rivière-du-Loup—Kataskomiq—Témiscouata
45th	2025–present	Bernard Généreux	Conservative

== Election results ==
=== Côte-du-Sud—Rivière-du-Loup—Kataskomiq—Témiscouata, 2023 representation order ===
2025 Canadian federal election
Party	Candidate	Votes	%	±%	Expenditures
Conservative	Bernard Généreux	28,873	45.84	+0.95	$74,118.29
Liberal	Rémi Massé	19,097	30.32	+11.26	$32,782.51
Bloc Québécois	Diane Sénécal	12,598	20.00	–9.81	$21,576.29
New Democratic	Iseult L'Heureux Hubert	1,072	1.70	–1.68	$0.00
Green	Alexie Plourde	682	1.08	N/A	$0.00
People's	Jean-François Morin	464	0.74	+0.38	$1,392.56
Rhinoceros	Thibaud Mony	206	0.33	–0.20	$0.00
Total valid votes/expense limit		62,992	98.49	+0.48	$147,384.97
Total rejected ballots		967	1.51	-0.48	
Turnout		63,959	66.80	+5.28	
Eligible voters		95,745			
Conservative notional hold		Swing		-5.16	
Source: Elections Canada
Note: number of eligible voters does not include voting day registrations.

2021 federal election redistributed results
Party	Vote	%
Conservative	25,691	44.88
Bloc Québécois	17,062	29.81
Liberal	10,906	19.05
New Democratic	1,933	3.38
Free	1,030	1.80
Rhinoceros	303	0.53
People's	202	0.35
Independent	112	0.20
Total valid votes	57,239	98.01
Rejected ballots	1,162	1.99
Registered voters/ estimated turnout	94,925	61.52

=== Montmagny—L'Islet—Kamouraska—Rivière-du-Loup, 2013 representation order ===
2021 Canadian federal election: Montmagny—L'Islet—Kamouraska—Rivière-du-Loup
Party	Candidate	Votes	%	±%	Expenditures
Conservative	Bernard Généreux	24,118	50.46	+8.80	$57,587.54
Bloc Québécois	Simon Bérubé	12,523	26.20	-6.07	$0.00
Liberal	François Lapointe	8,371	17.51	+1.22	$18,377.55
New Democratic	Sean English	1,597	3.34	-3.57	$181.66
Free	Nancy Rochon	919	1.92	–	$806.33
Rhinoceros	Thibaud Mony	269	0.56	–	$0.00
Total valid votes/expense limit		47,797	–	–	$110,137.98
Total rejected ballots					
Turnout			60.86	-4.69	
Eligible voters		78,533			
Conservative hold		Swing		+7.44	
Source: Elections Canada

2019 Canadian federal election: Montmagny—L'Islet—Kamouraska—Rivière-du-Loup
Party	Candidate	Votes	%	±%	Expenditures
Conservative	Bernard Généreux	20,989	41.65	+11.66	$60,089.97
Bloc Québécois	Louis Gagnon	16,261	32.27	+16.15	$19,069.27
Liberal	Aladin Legault d'Auteuil	8,210	16.29	-12.14	none listed
New Democratic	Hugo Latulippe	3,481	6.91	-17.29	none listed
Green	Denis Ducharme	1,030	2.04	+0.37	none listed
People's	Serge Haché	417	0.83	-	none listed
Total valid votes/expense limit		50,388	98.10		
Total rejected ballots		976	1.90		
Turnout		51,364	65.46		
Eligible voters		78,461			
Conservative hold		Swing		-1.74	
Source: Elections Canada

2015 Canadian federal election: Montmagny—L'Islet—Kamouraska—Rivière-du-Loup
Party	Candidate	Votes	%	±%	Expenditures
Conservative	Bernard Généreux	14,274	28.99	-7.35	$77,412.02
Liberal	Marie-Josée Normand	14,002	28.43	+22.66	$14,137.69
New Democratic	François Lapointe	11,918	24.20	-12.16	$42,243.41
Bloc Québécois	Louis Gagnon	7,939	16.12	-3.97	$23,835.49
Green	Chantal Breton	823	1.67	+0.22	–
Rhinoceros	Bien Gras Gagné	287	0.58	–	–
Total valid votes/expense limit		49,243	100.0		$212,861.18
Total rejected ballots		777	1.50	+0.10	
Turnout		50,020	63.72	+2.66	
Eligible voters		78,489			
Conservative gain from New Democratic		Swing		+4.81	
These results were subject to a judicial recount, and modified from the validated results in accordance with the Judge's rulings. The margin of Bernard Généreux over Marie-Josée Normand increased from 269 votes to 272 votes as a result of the recount.
Source: Elections Canada

There were no boundary changes for the 2015 Canadian federal election.

=== Montmagny—L'Islet—Kamouraska—Rivière-du-Loup, 2003 representation order ===
2011 Canadian federal election: Montmagny—L'Islet—Kamouraska—Rivière-du-Loup
Party	Candidate	Votes	%	±%	Expenditures
New Democratic	François Lapointe	17,285	36.36	+31.58	$1,995.19
Conservative	Bernard Généreux	17,276	36.34	-6.33	$79,493.77
Bloc Québécois	Nathalie Arsenault	9,550	20.09	-17.58	$66,461.89
Liberal	Andrew Caddell	2,743	5.77	-7.55	$11,840.48
Green	Lynette Tremblay	691	1.45	-0.21	none listed
Total valid votes/expense limit		47,545	100.0		$87,227.52
Total rejected, unmarked and declined ballots		677	1.40	+0.48	
Turnout		48,222	61.06	+24.13	
Eligible voters		78,969			
New Democratic gain from Conservative		Swing		+18.96	
This vote was subject to mandatory judicial recount due to the margin of win being less than 1/1000 of the total votes. The validated results resulted in Lapointe's victory by a margin of 5 votes. After the recount by a judge, M. Lapointe was confirmed the winner on 13 May 2011, this time by a margin of 9 votes. Changes are based on results from the 2009 by-election.

Canadian federal by-election, November 9, 2009: Montmagny—L'Islet—Kamouraska—Rivière-du-Loup
Party	Candidate	Votes	%	±%	Expenditures
Conservative	Bernard Généreux	12,162	42.67	+12.03	$85,278.26
Bloc Québécois	Nancy Gagnon	10,737	37.67	-8.36	$74,821.57
Liberal	Marcel Catellier	3,768	13.22	-2.13	$28,252.66
New Democratic	François Lapointe	1,363	4.78	-0.67	$24,823.51
Green	Charles Marois	472	1.66	-0.54	none listed
Total valid votes		28,502	100.0		$86,257
Total rejected, unmarked and declined ballots		264	0.92	-0.27	
Turnout		28,766	36.93	-20.56	
Eligible voters		77,877			
Conservative gain from Bloc Québécois		Swing		+10.20	
By-election due to the resignation of Paul Crête

2006 Canadian federal election
Party	Candidate	Votes	%	±%	Expenditures
Bloc Québécois	Paul Crête	24,117	52.44	-4.69	$62,315.33
Conservative	Daniel Nadeau	11,529	25.07	+15.96	$2,633.47
Liberal	Lise M. Vachon	6,466	14.06	-15.54	$26,095.93
New Democratic	Myriam Leblanc	2,107	4.58	+2.61	$1,394.64
Green	Serge Lemay	1,768	3.84	+1.67	$151.25
Total valid votes/expense limit		45,987	100.0		$79,280
Total rejected, unmarked and declined ballots		672	1.44	-0.50	
Turnout		46,659	59.53		
Eligible voters		78,382			
Bloc Québécois hold		Swing		-10.32	

=== Rivière-du-Loup—Montmagny, 2003 representation order ===
2004 Canadian federal election
Party	Candidate	Votes	%	±%	Expenditures
Bloc Québécois	Paul Crête	25,327	57.13	+8.21	$58,665.91
Liberal	Isabelle Mignault	13,124	29.60	-9.91	$50,107.79
Conservative	Marc-André Drolet	4,040	9.11	-1.17	$11,331.38
Green	André Clermont	962	2.17	–	none listed
New Democratic	Frédérick Garon	876	1.97	+0.91	none listed
Total valid votes/expense limit		44,329	100.0		$77,868
Total rejected, unmarked and declined ballots		877	1.94		
Turnout		45,206	57.61	-0.69	
Eligible voters		78,473			
Bloc Québécois notional hold		Swing		+9.06	
Changes from 2000 are based on redistributed results. Change for the Conservative Party is based on the combined total of the Canadian Alliance and the Progressive Conservative Party.

2000 federal election redistributed results
Party	Vote	%
Bloc Québécois	21,530	48.92
Liberal	17,390	39.51
Alliance	2,855	6.49
Progressive Conservative	1,667	3.79
New Democratic	468	1.06
Others	103	0.23

== See also ==
- List of Canadian electoral districts
- Historical federal electoral districts of Canada
