= Paul Crête =

Canadian politician

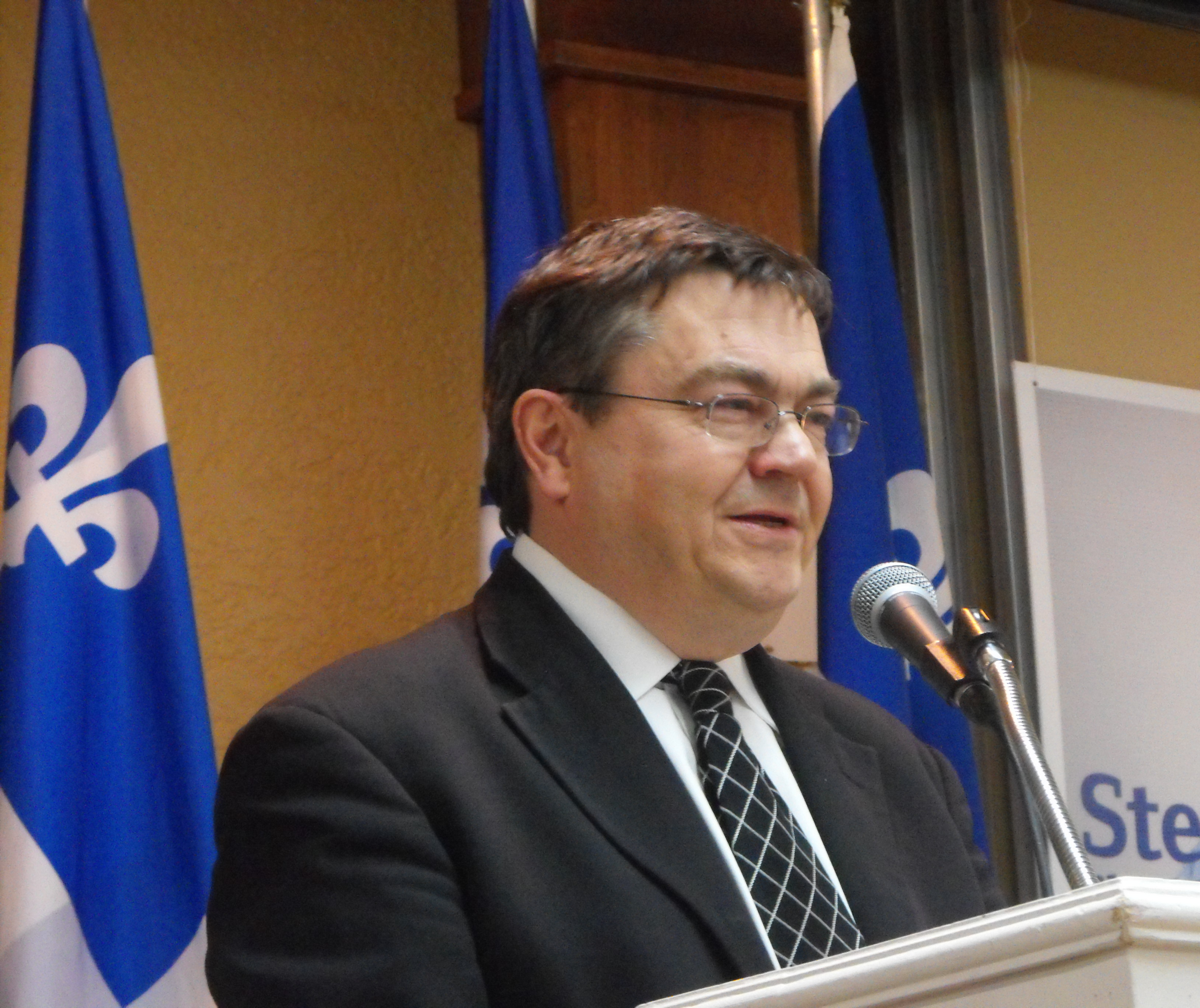

Member of Parliament for Montmagny—L'Islet—Kamouraska—Rivière-du-Loup (Kamouraska—Rivière-du-Loup—Témiscouata—Les Basques; 1997–2004) (Kamouraska—Rivière-du-Loup; 1993–1997)
- In office October 25, 1993 – May 21, 2009
- Preceded by: André Plourde
- Succeeded by: Bernard Généreux

Personal details
- Born: April 8, 1953 (age 73) Hérouxville, Quebec
- Party: Bloc Québécois
- Spouse: Myriam Santerre
- Profession: human resources director

Paul Crête (French pronunciation: [pɔl kʁɛt]; born April 8, 1953) is a Canadian politician, who served as a Member of Parliament for the Bloc Québécois in the House of Commons of Canada from 1993 until 2009, when he announced that he was moving to provincial politics.

== Political career ==
Crête was born in Hérouxville, Quebec. Prior to his political career, he was a school administrator. Crête was first elected in 1993 representing Kamouraska—Rivière-du-Loup in the 1993 Canadian federal election, then re-elected in 1997 representing Kamouraska—Rivière-du-Loup—Témiscouata—Les Basques defeating former Quebec MNA France Dionne in a hotly contested five-way race.

Crête was re-elected in the 2000 election and again in 2004 election for Rivière-du-Loup—Montmagny.

In May 2009, he resigned from the House of Commons to run for the Parti Québécois in the June 22 provincial by-election in Rivière-du-Loup. He lost to Liberal candidate Jean D'Amour.

== Critic ==
- Rural Solidarity ( - 1998)
- Pension Reform ( - 1998)
- Transport ( - 1998)
- Human Resources Development (January 1, 1997 - June 26, 2002)
- Children and Youth (2002 - June 26, 2002)
- Industry (2002–2009)

== House of Commons Committees ==
=== Vice-Chair ===
- Standing Committee on Industry, Natural Resources, Science and Technology 38th Parliament, 1st Session

=== Member ===
- Standing Committee on Human Resources Development and the Status of Persons with Disabilities 36th Parliament, 1st Session
- Subcommittee on Agenda and Procedure of the Standing Committee on Human Resources Development and the Status of Persons with Disabilities, 36th Parliament, 1st Session
- Standing Committee on Human Resources Development and the Status of Persons with Disabilities, 36th Parliament, 2nd Session
- Subcommittee on Agenda and Procedure of the Standing Committee on Human Resources Development and the Status of Persons with Disabilities, 36th Parliament, 2nd Session
- Standing Committee on Human Resources Development and the Status of Persons with Disabilities, 37th Parliament, 1st Session
- Subcommittee on Agenda and Procedure of the Standing Committee on Human Resources Development and the Status of Persons with Disabilities, 37th Parliament, 1st Session
- Subcommittee on Agenda and Procedure of the Standing Committee on Human Resources Development and the Status of Persons with Disabilities, 37th Parliament, 1st Session
- Standing Committee on Industry, Science and Technology, 37th Parliament, 2nd Session
- Subcommittee on Agenda and Procedure of the Standing Committee on Industry, Science and Technology, 37th Parliament, 2nd Session
- Standing Committee on Industry, Science and Technology, 37th Parliament, 3rd Session
- Subcommittee on Agenda and Procedure of the Standing Committee on Industry, Science and Technology, 37th Parliament, 3rd Session
- Standing Committee on Industry, Natural Resources, Science and Technology, 38th Parliament, 1st Session
