= Yvan Bernier =

Canadian politician

Member of Parliament for Gaspé
- In office 1993–2000
- Preceded by: Charles-Eugène Marin
- Succeeded by: none

Personal details
- Born: 17 June 1960 (age 65) Cap-aux-Os, Gaspe, Quebec, Canada
- Party: Bloc Québécois
- Profession: businessman

Yvan Bernier (born 17 June 1960) was a member of the House of Commons of Canada from 1993 to 2000. He is a businessperson by career.

He was elected in the Gaspé electoral district under the Bloc Québécois party in the 1993 federal election. He was re-elected in 1997 under the restructured territory of the Bonaventure—Gaspé—Îles-de-la-Madeleine—Pabok riding. Bernier served in the 35th and 36th Canadian Parliaments before leaving Canadian politics.
