= Henri LaRue =

Canadian politician (1892–1973)

Member of Parliament for Matane
- In office July 1930 – October 1935
- Preceded by: Georges-Léonidas Dionne
- Succeeded by: riding dissolved

Personal details
- Born: Joseph-Ernest-Henri LaRue; 15 February 1892 Baie-des-Sables, Quebec, Canada
- Died: 20 October 1973 (aged 81)
- Party: Conservative
- Spouse(s): Marguerite Perrault m. 18 October 1922
- Profession: Notary

Joseph-Ernest-Henri LaRue (15 February 1892 – 20 October 1973) was a Conservative member of the House of Commons of Canada. He was born in Baie-des-Sables, Quebec and became a notary.

LaRue attended school at the Quebec Seminary, then Université Laval.

He was elected to Parliament at the Matane riding in the 1930 general election. After serving only one term, the 17th Canadian Parliament, riding boundary changes resulted in LaRue seeking re-election at the new Matapédia—Matane where he was defeated by Arthur-Joseph Lapointe of the Liberals in the 1935 federal election. LaRue made an unsuccessful bid to return to Parliament at Matapédia—Matane under the National Government banner in the 1940 federal election.
