= Tartigou River =

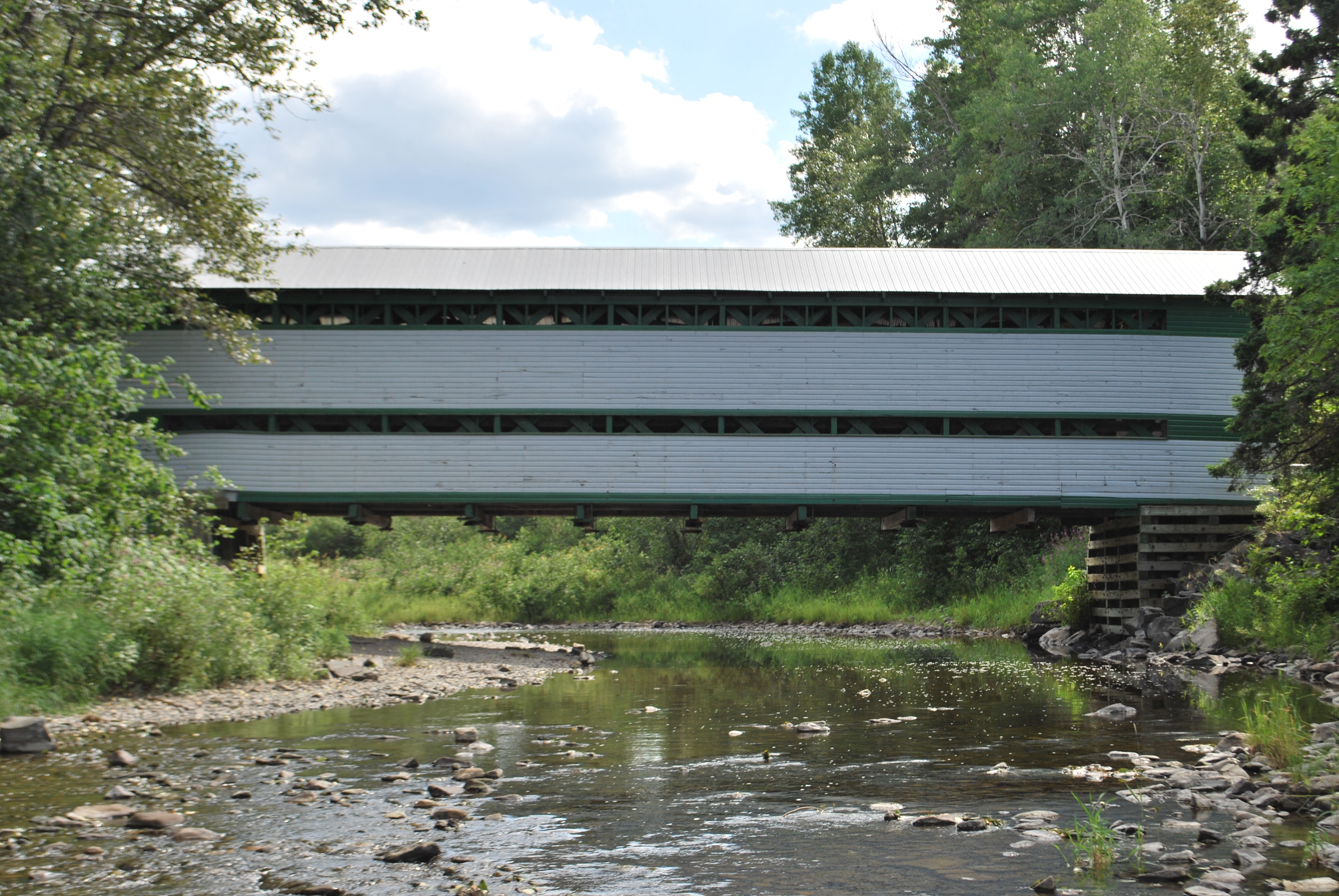
- Tartigou river in Métis-sur-Mer.
- Native name: Rivière Tartigou (French)

Location
- Country: Canada
- Province: Quebec

Physical characteristics
- Source
  - location: Bon-Dieu Lake
  - coordinates: 48°30′12″N 67°53′46″W
- Mouth
  - location: Baie-des-Sables, Saint Lawrence River
  - coordinates: 48°45′19″N 67°47′41″W
- Length: 45 km (28 mi)

The Tartigou River is a watercourse over 45 kilometres (28 mi) long in the Matapedia Valley in Quebec, Canada. Its origin lies in the Bon-Dieu Lake in Saint-Moïse, while its mouth is on the Saint Lawrence in Baie-des-Sables.

== Etymology ==
The name Tartigou comes from a transcription of the Mi'kmaq word tlagatigotj. Tartig means "river of the little colony" or "little river of the colony."

== Geography ==
The Tartigou River takes its water from the Matapedia Valley in the Bas-Saint-Laurent administrative region of the Gaspé Peninsula. It travels 10 kilometres (6 mi) northeast to Saint-Noël before turning to the west to follow a railroad for 5 kilometres (3 mi). Then, the river changes again to a northeast course until it reaches the Saint Lawrence River in Baie-des-Sables, also located in Bas-Saint-Laurent.
