= Timeline of the 2015 Canadian federal election =

This is a timeline for the 42nd Canadian federal election, which took place in October 2015.

== 2011 ==
- May 2, 2011: The Conservative Party of Canada wins a majority government in the 41st federal election.
- May 2, 2011: The New Democratic Party of Canada becomes, for the first time in Canada's history, the Official Opposition with 102 seats.
- May 3, 2011: Gilles Duceppe resigns as leader and president of the Bloc Québécois, and Vivian Barbot is named as the interim president.
- May 25, 2011: Michael Ignatieff resigns as leader of the Liberal Party, and Bob Rae is chosen as interim leader.
- June 2, 2011: The 41st Parliament convenes.
- July 25, 2011: Jack Layton temporarily steps down as leader of the NDP, due to cancer, indicating his intention to return to the job for the reconvening of Parliament in September. Hull—Aylmer MP Nycole Turmel is chosen to act as NDP leader during the leave.
- August 22, 2011: Jack Layton dies of cancer. Turmel assumes the position of Leader of the Opposition.
- December 5, 2011: Edmonton East MP Peter Goldring voluntarily leaves the Conservative caucus after being charged with refusing to provide a breath sample at a traffic stop.
- December 11, 2011: Daniel Paillé is elected leader of the Bloc Québécois at the party's 2011 leadership election.
- December 16, 2011: Royal assent is given to the Fair Representation Act, raising the number of seats to 338. Fifteen will be added to Ontario, six each to British Columbia and Alberta, and three to Quebec.

== 2012 ==
- January 10, 2012: MP for Saint-Maurice—Champlain, the NDP's Lise St-Denis, crosses the floor to join the Liberal caucus.
- March 19, 2012: NDP candidate Craig Scott wins a federal by-election held in Toronto—Danforth, Jack Layton's former riding.
- March 24, 2012: Thomas Mulcair is elected leader of the New Democratic Party.
- April 23, 2012: Thunder Bay—Superior North MP Bruce Hyer leaves the NDP caucus after being disciplined for voting against the NDP's position on the gun registry.
- May 18, 2012: An Ontario Superior Court judge declares the 2011 federal election results in the riding of Etobicoke Centre to be "null and void", potentially triggering a by-election.
- May 28, 2012: Conservative MP Ted Opitz announces he will appeal to the Supreme Court of Canada to uphold the result in Etobicoke Centre.
- May 30, 2012: Conservative Lee Richardson resigns as MP for Calgary Centre, to accept a job as principal secretary to Alberta Premier Alison Redford.
- June 13, 2012: Interim Liberal leader Bob Rae announces that he will not be seeking the leadership of the Liberals.
- July 31, 2012: Bev Oda resigns as Minister for International Co-operation and as MP for Durham.
- August 31, 2012: Citing health, Denise Savoie (NDP) resigns as MP for Victoria.
- October 25, 2012: The Supreme Court of Canada upholds the result in Etobicoke Centre, with Conservative MP Ted Opitz keeping his seat.
- November 2012–October 2013: Electoral boundary commissions present their proposals to the House of Commons.
- November 26, 2012: By-elections are held in Calgary Centre, Durham, and Victoria. Incumbent parties retain all three ridings: Conservative candidates Joan Crockatt and Erin O'Toole win Calgary Centre and Durham, respectively, while NDP candidate Murray Rankin wins Victoria.

== 2013 ==
- February 27, 2013: NDP MP Claude Patry crosses the floor to the Bloc Québécois.
- March 14, 2013: Following controversy over campaign donations made during the 2011 election, Peter Penashue resigns as Minister of Intergovernmental Affairs and as MP for Labrador to contest the seat in a by-election.
- April 14, 2013: Justin Trudeau is elected leader of the Liberal Party of Canada.
- May 13, 2013: A by-election was held in Labrador, with Liberal candidate Yvonne Jones taking the seat from former Conservative MP Peter Penashue.
- June 2, 2013: Liberal Denis Coderre resigns as MP for Bourassa in order to run for Mayor of Montreal.
- June 5, 2013: Edmonton—St. Albert MP Brent Rathgeber voluntarily leaves the Conservative caucus because of what he describes as "the Government's lack of commitment to transparency and open government", one day after tabling a bill on government transparency.
- June 6, 2013: Edmonton East MP Peter Goldring rejoins the Conservative caucus after being acquitted of his 2011 charge of refusing to provide a breath sample at a traffic stop.
- July 8, 2013: Minister of Public Safety Vic Toews resigns as Minister and as MP for Provencher, citing a desire to spend more time with his family.
- July 31, 2013: Former interim Liberal leader and Toronto Centre MP Bob Rae resigns in order to become First Nations negotiator in Northern Ontario.
- August 31, 2013: Conservative Merv Tweed resigns as MP for Brandon—Souris to become President of OmniTRAX Canada.
- September 12, 2013: Maria Mourani, Bloc Québécois MP for Ahuntsic, is expelled from caucus due to comments she made against the Quebec Charter of Values proposed by the Parti Québécois government of Pauline Marois.
- September 26, 2013: Peterborough MP Dean Del Mastro leaves the Conservative caucus after being charged with breaking campaign rules during the 2008 election.
- November 6, 2013: Conservative MP Ted Menzies resigns as MP for Macleod.
- November 25, 2013: By-elections are held in Bourassa, Brandon—Souris, Provencher, and Toronto Centre. Incumbent parties retain all four ridings: Conservative candidates Larry Maguire and Ted Falk are elected in Brandon—Souris and Provencher respectively, while Liberal candidates Emmanuel Dubourg and Chrystia Freeland are elected in Bourassa and Toronto Centre respectively.
- December 13, 2013: Thunder Bay—Superior North MP Bruce Hyer, who had left the NDP in 2012 to sit as an independent, joins the Green Party of Canada.
- December 16, 2013: Bloc Québécois leader Daniel Paillé steps down for health reasons, and Annie Lessard is named as the interim president.

== 2014 ==
- January 17, 2014: Brian Jean, the Conservative MP for Fort McMurray—Athabasca, resigns his seat.
- January 29, 2014: Justin Trudeau states that senate partisanship has interfered with senators' responsibilities, that the 32 Liberal senators were no longer part of the Liberal parliamentary caucus, and he had asked them to sit as independents.
- March 12, 2014: Olivia Chow, the NDP MP for Trinity—Spadina, resigns her seat to run in the 2014 Toronto mayoral election.
- April 1, 2014: Jim Karygiannis, the Liberal MP for Scarborough—Agincourt, resigns his seat to enter Toronto municipal politics.
- April 10, 2014: Jim Flaherty, the Conservative MP for Whitby—Oshawa, dies due to an apparent heart attack.
- May 1, 2014: New electoral boundaries, which will increase the number of seats to 338, will come into effect upon the first dissolution of Parliament after this date.
- June 6, 2014: Montcalm MP Manon Perreault is suspended from the NDP caucus following allegations she misled police.
- June 14, 2014: Mario Beaulieu is elected leader of the Bloc Québécois.
- June 23–25, 2014: Mario Beaulieu officially takes the leadership of the Bloc Québécois at its leadership convention.
- June 30, 2014: By-elections are held in four ridings. Conservative candidates John Barlow and David Yurdiga retain Macleod and Fort McMurray—Athabasca, respectively, while Liberal candidate Arnold Chan retains Scarborough—Agincourt. Liberal candidate Adam Vaughan is elected in Trinity—Spadina, taking the seat from the NDP.
- August 12, 2014: Haute-Gaspésie—La Mitis—Matane—Matapédia MP Jean-François Fortin quits the Bloc Québécois caucus to sit as an independent MP, citing disapproval of new BQ leader Mario Beaulieu.
- August 20, 2014: Verchères—Les Patriotes MP Sana Hassainia leaves the NDP to sit as an independent, due to a conflict with the party over its stance on the 2014 Israel–Gaza conflict.
- August 25, 2014: Richmond—Arthabaska MP André Bellavance quits the Bloc Québécois caucus to sit as an independent MP, citing an inability to work with Bloc Québécois leader Mario Beaulieu.
- September 17, 2014: Rob Merrifield, the Conservative MP for Yellowhead, resigns his seat to accept an appointment from Alberta Premier Jim Prentice as the province's envoy to the United States.
- October 21, 2014: Repentigny MP Jean-François Larose leaves the NDP caucus, along with independent Haute-Gaspésie—La Mitis—Matane—Matapédia MP Jean-François Fortin, to form Strength in Democracy, a new Quebec-centred political party.
- November 5, 2014:
  - Avalon MP Scott Andrews and Saint-Léonard—Saint-Michel MP Massimo Pacetti are suspended from the Liberal caucus following allegations of sexual harassment.
  - Dean Del Mastro, the independent MP for Peterborough, resigns his seat after being found guilty on three counts of violating election spending limits. Prior to Del Mastro's resignation, the House of Commons was expected to vote in favour of an NDP proposal to suspend Del Mastro without pay, effective immediately.
- November 17, 2014: By-elections are held in Whitby—Oshawa and Yellowhead. The Conservatives hold both ridings, under candidates Pat Perkins and Jim Eglinski respectively.
- November 19, 2014: Independent MP Maria Mourani becomes a member of the NDP, but will continue to sit as an independent for the duration of the current Parliament per the NDP's policy against floor-crossing.

== 2015 ==
- January 5, 2015: Glenn Thibeault, the New Democratic MP for Sudbury resigns his seat to run as the Ontario Liberal Party candidate in a by-election for the provincial riding of the same name.
- February 9, 2015: Mississauga—Brampton South MP Eve Adams crosses the floor from the Conservatives to the Liberals.
- March 18, 2015: Massimo Pacetti, independent (former Liberal) MP for Saint-Léonard—Saint-Michel, announces he will serve out his term as an independent and not run for reelection amid reports he is about to be permanently expelled from caucus.
- March 19, 2015: Scott Andrews, independent (former Liberal) MP for Avalon, announces he accepts the findings of an investigation into his misconduct and will serve out his term as an independent.
- March 16, 2015: John Baird, the former Conservative cabinet minister and the MP for Ottawa West—Nepean, resigns his seat.
- March 31, 2015: James Lunney, Conservative MP for Nanaimo—Alberni leaves the Conservative Party caucus to sit as an independent, citing concerns about religious freedom.
- May 13, 2015: Patrick Brown, the Conservative MP for Barrie, resigns his seat after being elected leader of the Progressive Conservative Party of Ontario.
- June 9, 2015: Bloc splits the position of leader into two different positions : Mario Beaulieu remains as president (internal organisation), while Gilles Duceppe comes back as political leader only. The decision has later been approved in a special congress on July 1, with 99.7% in favour.
- August 2, 2015: Parliament dissolved and writs of election dropped.
- September 28, 2015: Deadlines for candidates to submit their nomination.
- September 30, 2015: Confirmed list of candidates is published.
- October 9–12, 2015: Advance polls were open. An estimated record of 3.6 million electors cast their ballot, a 71% increase over the previous 2011 election. This turnout was superseded during the 2019 general election.
- October 19, 2015: Scheduled polling day. The Governor-in-Council retains constitutional authority, subject to section 4(1) of the Constitution Act, 1982, to set an earlier election date.
