= Timeline of the 2011 Canadian federal election =

This article outlines the events leading up to the 41st Canadian federal election of May 2, 2011, starting with the prior election.

- October 14, 2008: Elections held for members of the House of Commons in the 40th Canadian Parliament.
- November 4, 2008: Writs returned to the Chief Election Officer.
- November 18, 2008: 40th Parliament first convenes.
- December 1, 2008: The Liberals and NDP sign agreement on proposed coalition government to replace the governing Conservatives under Prime Minister Harper.

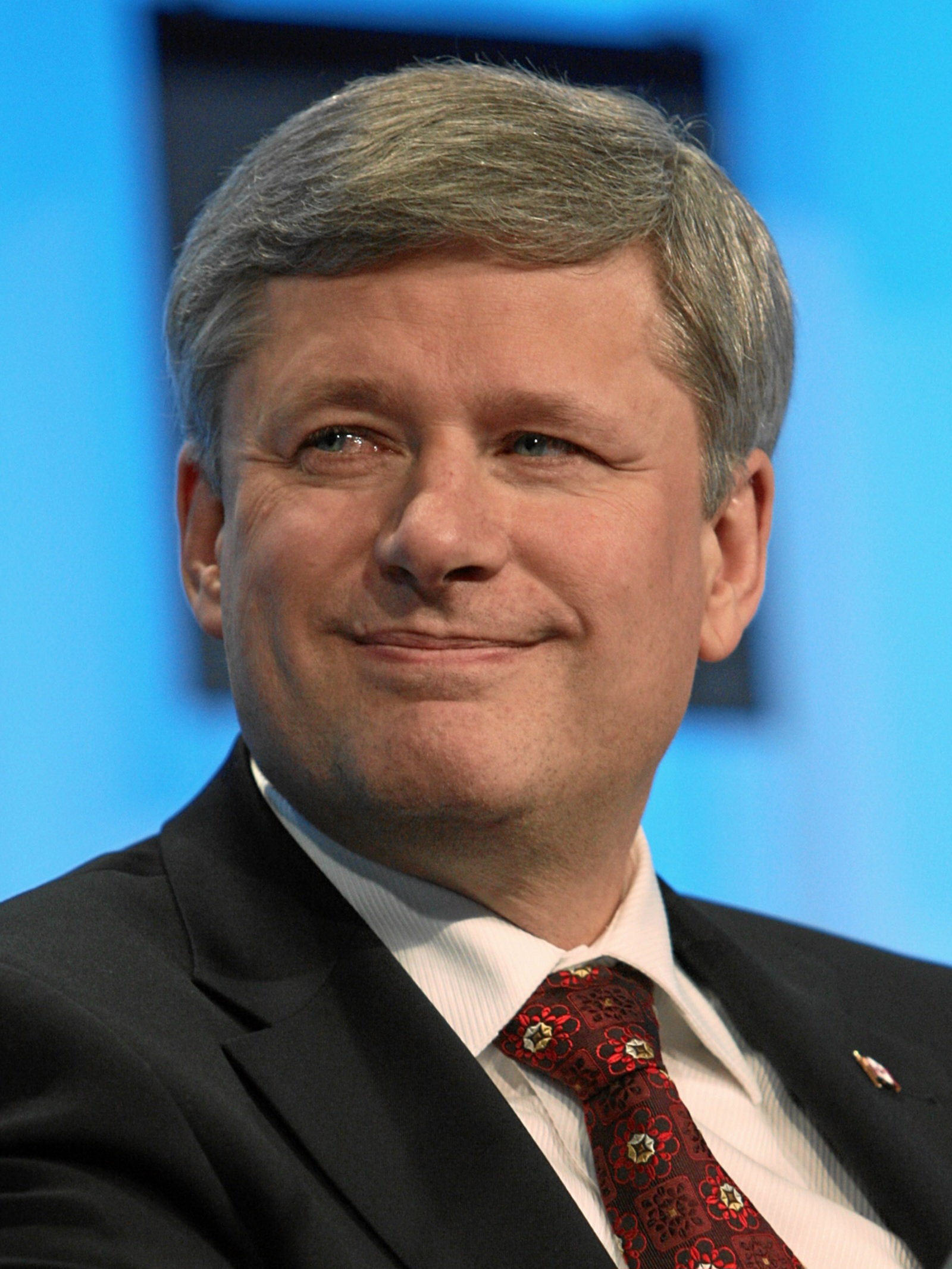
Stephen Harper, Prime Minister of Canada

- December 1, 2008: The Liberals, NDP, and Bloc Québécois sign "policy accord" whereby the Bloc would support a Liberal/NDP government for at least 18 months.
- December 4, 2008: Parliament prorogued by the Governor General during the parliamentary dispute on advice of the Prime Minister.
- December 8, 2008: Stéphane Dion announces his resignation as leader of the Liberal Party (after his successor is chosen)
- December 10, 2008: Michael Ignatieff is chosen by the Liberal caucus as interim leader of the Liberal Party

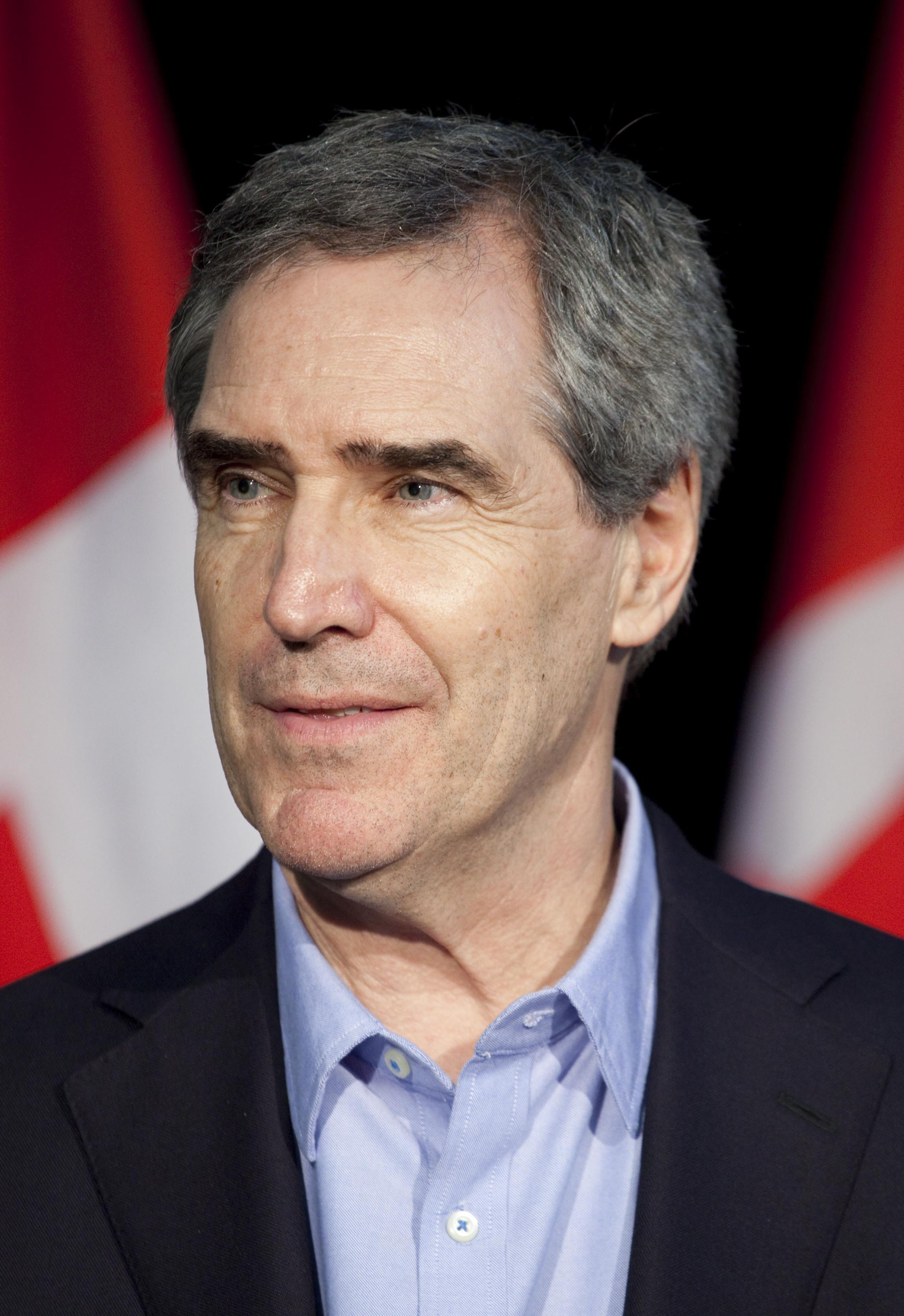
Michael Ignatieff, Leader of the Liberal Party of Canada

- January 26, 2009: Parliament to reconvene for second session.
- January 28, 2009: Michael Ignatieff announces that the Liberal Party will support the Conservative Budget.
- April 13, 2009: Dawn Black, NDP MP from New Westminster—Coquitlam, resigns her seat to run in the 2009 British Columbia general election
- April 30, 2009: Bill Casey, Independent MP from Cumberland—Colchester—Musquodoboit Valley, resigns his seat to accept a job with the Nova Scotia Department of Intergovernmental Affairs.
- May 2, 2009: Michael Ignatieff officially becomes leader of the Liberal Party at the party convention in Vancouver
- May 4, 2009: All members of the Conservative Party caucus are renominated in their ridings.
- May 21, 2009: Paul Crête, BQ MP from Montmagny—L'Islet—Kamouraska—Rivière-du-Loup, resigns his seat to run in the Rivière-du-Loup provincial by-election.

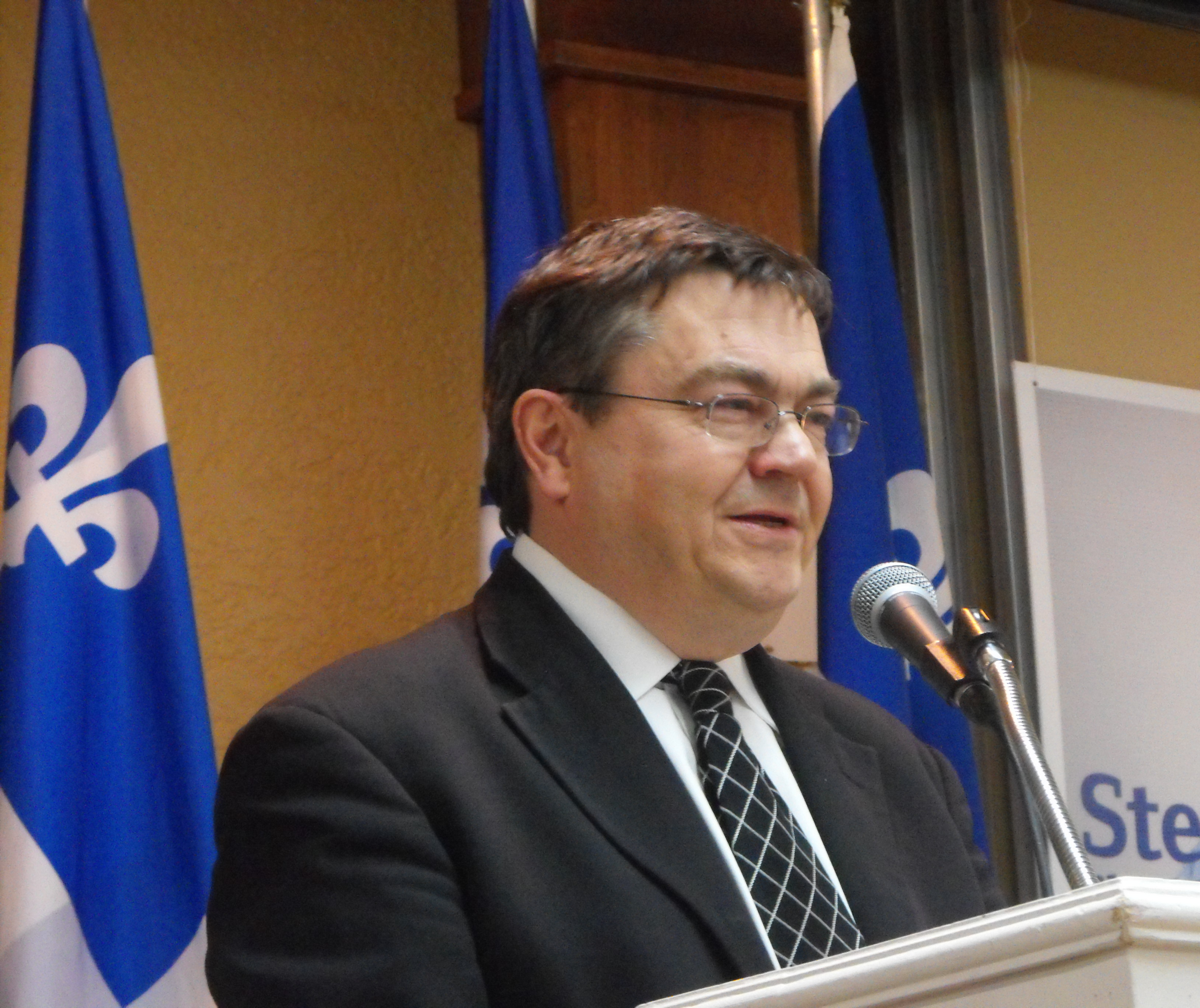
Paul Crête, Former MP for the Bloc Québécois

- August 31, 2009: Michael Ignatieff announces that the Liberal Party will no longer support the Harper Government.
- September 16, 2009: Réal Ménard, BQ MP from Hochelaga, resigns his seat to run in the 2009 Montreal municipal election.
- October 1, 2009: The Liberal Party proposes a no-confidence motion, which is defeated in the House when the NDP abstain from voting, causing the vote to fail.
- November 9, 2009: Four by-elections are held. The Conservatives gain two seats—one previously held by the BQ and one by an independent. The BQ and NDP hold one seat apiece.
- December 30, 2009: Prime Minister Harper prorogues Parliament until March 3.
- March 3, 2010: Parliament resumes.
- April 9, 2010: Helena Guergis, resigned her post as Minister of State for Status of Women and is forced to leave the Conservative caucus and sit as an independent pending a Royal Canadian Mounted Police investigation into her conduct.
- April 30, 2010: NDP MP Judy Wasylycia-Leis resigns as MP and leaves federal politics, in order to run for Mayor of Winnipeg.
- August 25, 2010: Liberal MP Maurizio Bevilacqua announces his intention to resign as MP for Vaughan.
- September 15, 2010: Dauphin—Swan River—Marquette Conservative MP Inky Mark's resignation takes effect. He has announced he will be resigning on this date to run for mayor of Dauphin, Manitoba.
- October 22, 2010: Jean-Yves Roy, BQ MP for Haute-Gaspésie—La Mitis—Matane—Matapédia, resigns his seat. Roy had previously announced his intent not to run in the next election.
- October 25, 2010: Conservative MP and former Government House Leader Jay Hill resigns as MP for Prince George—Peace River

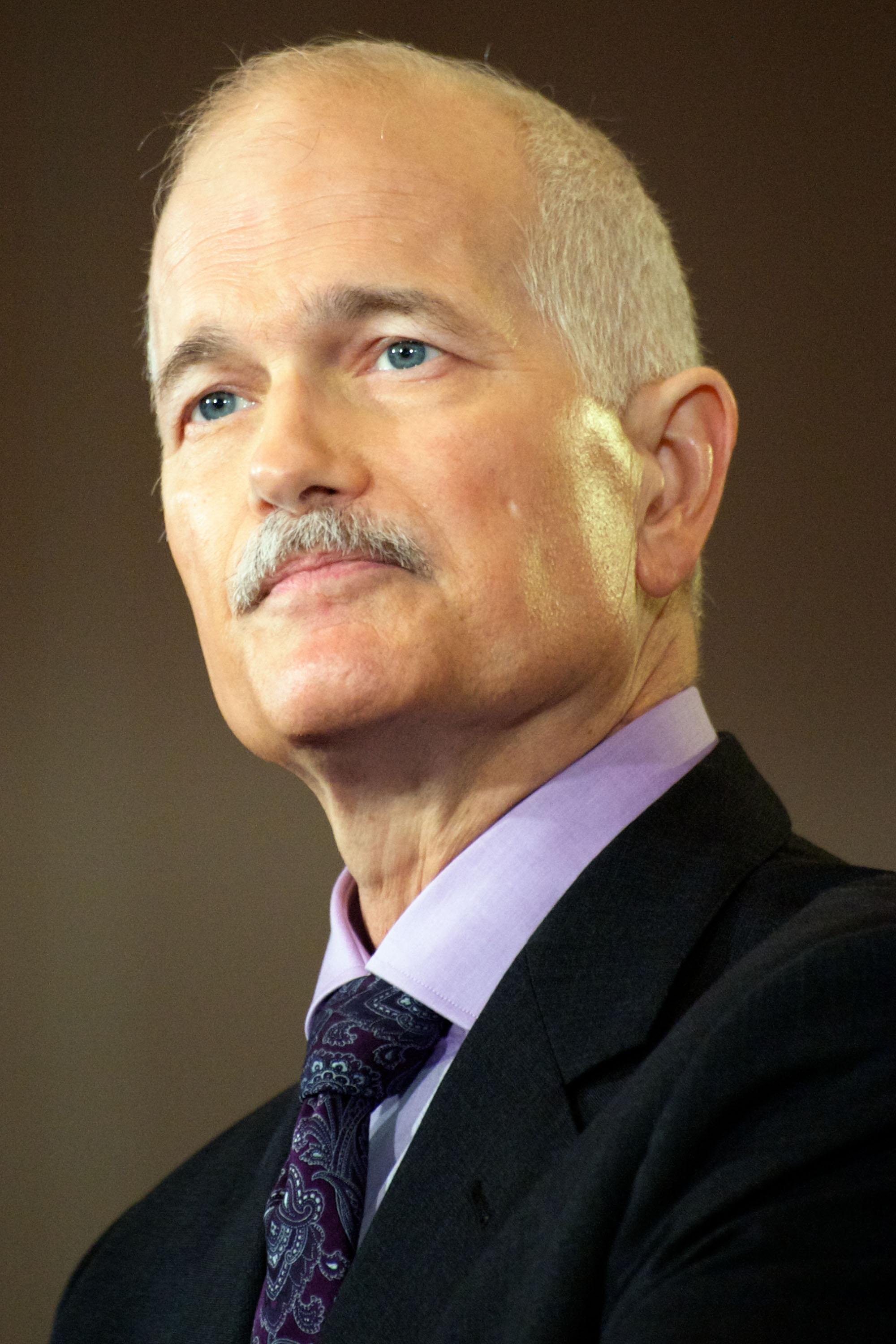
Jack Layton, Leader of the NDP

- November 14, 2010: Conservative MP and Minister of the Environment Jim Prentice resigns as MP for Calgary Centre-North to become vice-chairman of CIBC.

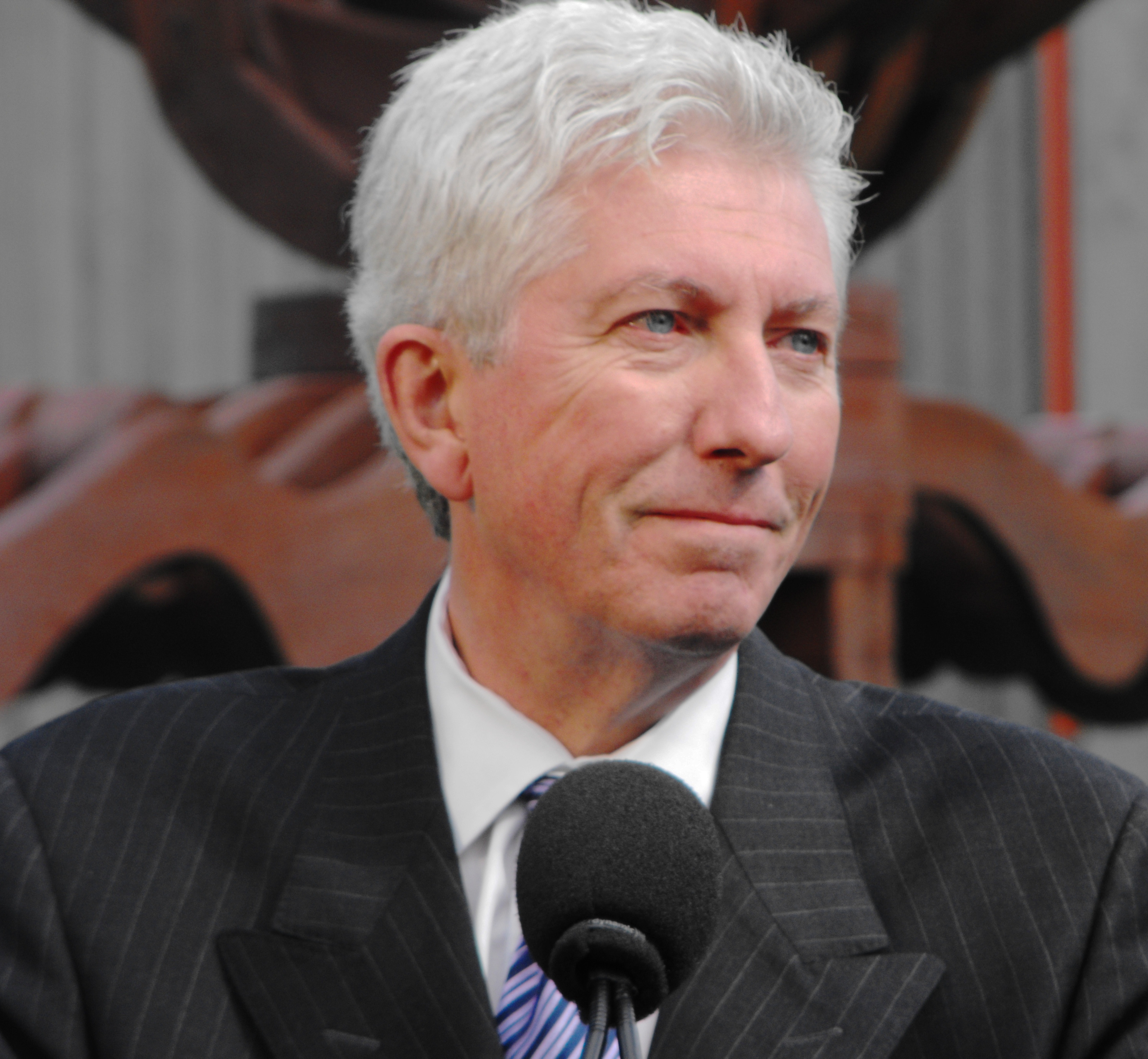
Gilles Duceppe, Leader of the Bloc Québécois

- November 29, 2010: Three by-elections are held. The Conservatives gain one seat from the Liberals and retain a seat, while the Liberals gain one seat from the NDP.
- January 31, 2011: The Newfoundland and Labrador First Party becomes deregistered after failing to meet a membership quota.
- March 21, 2011: A House of Commons committee recommends that the Conservative government be found in contempt of parliament.
- March 22, 2011: The 2011 federal budget is presented in the House of Commons. All three opposition parties state they will not support it.
- March 23, 2011: Michael Ignatieff introduces a no-confidence motion against the government on the contempt charge. Gilles Duceppe and Jack Layton say they will support it.
- March 25, 2011: The Liberal Party's no-confidence motion passes the House 156-145, causing the Prime Minister to motion for the House to adjourn.

The motion read as follows:

That the House agree with the finding of the Standing Committee on Procedure and House Affairs that the government is in contempt of Parliament, which is unprecedented in Canadian parliamentary history, and consequently, the House has lost confidence in the government.

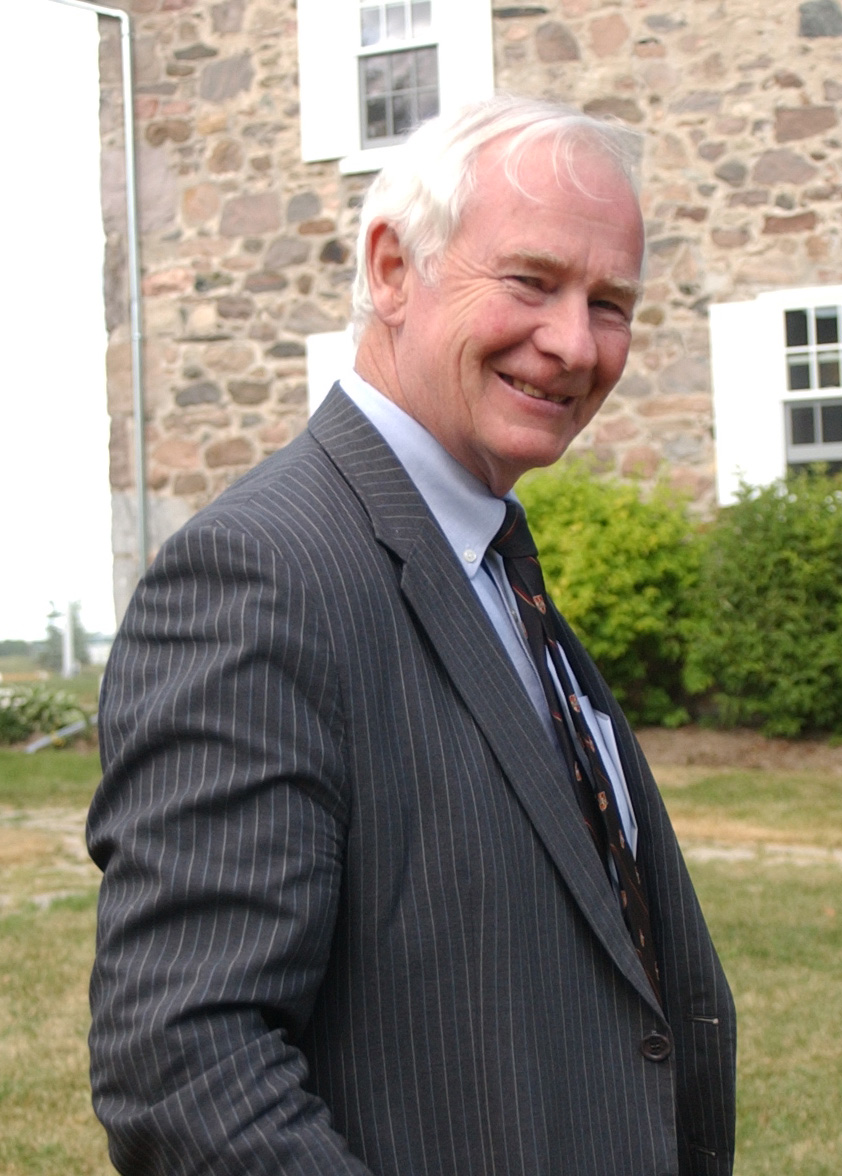
Governor General David Johnston

- March 26, 2011: Governor General David Johnston agrees to dissolve the 40th Canadian Parliament following a meeting with Prime Minister Stephen Harper.
- March 29, 2011: The consortium of broadcasters announces it will only invite leaders of the parties sitting in the House of Commons at dissolution to the leader's debate, excluding Elizabeth May.

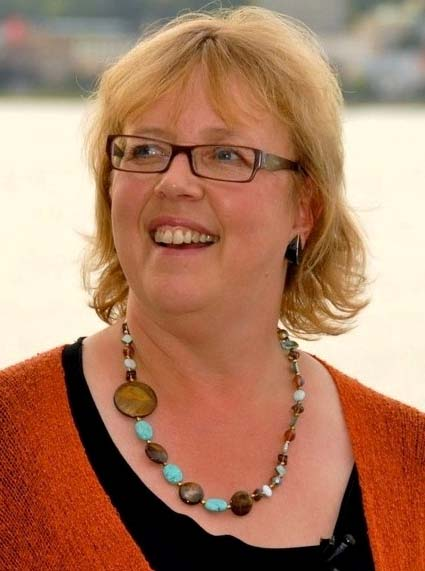
Elizabeth May, leader of the Green Party

- March 29, 2011: A Conservative party volunteer campaigning in Edmonton—Strathcona, Sebastien Togneri, is found to be under investigation by the Royal Canadian Mounted Police, and is removed from the campaign.
- March 30, 2011: It is announced Prime Minister Harper will not attend the April 29 wedding of Prince William of Wales and Kate Middleton in the United Kingdom.
- April 5, 2011: The Federal Court rejects the Green Party's request for an expedited hearing, on allowing May to attend the debates, prior to the scheduled debates.
- April 10, 2011: The French language debate is moved from April 14 to April 13, due to a Montreal Canadiens playoff game being scheduled for April 14.
- April 11, 2011: Manicouagan candidate, André Forbes, loses the support of the Liberal party.
- April 12, 2011: The English language leaders' debate takes place.
- April 13, 2011:
  - The nominations become official, with 1,587 people running in 308 ridings.
  - The People's Political Power Party of Canada become deregistered after failing to run a candidate.
  - The French language leaders' debate takes place.
- April 23, 2011: The fringe parties leaders' debate takes place.
- April 22, 23, and 25, 2011: Advanced polls takes place
- May 2, 2011:
  - Polling Day
  - The Conservative Party wins its first majority government, the New Democratic Party wins the most seats in its history, becoming the official opposition, and Elizabeth May becomes the first Green Party of Canada candidate elected. The Liberal Party won the fewest seats and received the smallest percentage of the popular vote in its history.
  - Gilles Duceppe steps down as leader and president of the Bloc Québécois.
- May 3, 2011:
  - Michael Ignatieff announces he will be stepping down as leader of the Liberal Party.
  - Vivian Barbot is chosen as the interim president of the Bloc, despite losing her seat.
- May 18, 2011: Jack Layton of the NDP sworn in as Leader of the Official Opposition
- May 23, 2011: Return of Writs
- May 25, 2011: Michael Ignatieff resigns as Liberal Party leader. Bob Rae is chosen as the interim leader.
- June 2, 2011:
  - Louis Plamondon is chosen as the parliamentary leader of the Bloc.
  - 41st Parliament convenes.

== See also ==
- 2008 Canadian federal election
- 2008 Timeline of the Canadian federal election
