= Georges Dionne =

Canadian politician

Georges L. Dionne

Member of Parliament for Matane
- In office October 1925 – July 1930
- Preceded by: François-Jean Pelletier
- Succeeded by: Henri LaRue

Personal details
- Born: Georges-Léonidas Dionne; 9 September 1876 Matane, Quebec, Canada
- Died: 11 April 1946 (aged 69)
- Party: Liberal
- Spouse(s): Alexina Martineau m. 4 October 1903
- Profession: notary

Georges-Léonidas Dionne (9 September 1876 – 11 April 1946) was a Liberal party member of the House of Commons of Canada. He was born in Matane, Quebec and became a notary.

Dionne's education included studies at Rimouski Seminary and Université Laval.

He was first elected to Parliament at the Matane riding in the 1925 general election then re-elected there in 1926. After completing his second term, the 16th Canadian Parliament, Dionne was defeated by Henri LaRue of the Conservatives. Dionne made an unsuccessful attempt to return to Parliament as a Reconstruction Party candidate in the 1935 federal election at Matapédia—Matane.
