= Party leader =

Official representative of a political party

In a governmental system, a party leader acts as the official representative of their political party, either to a legislature or to the electorate. Depending on the country, the individual colloquially referred to as the "leader" of a political party may officially be party chair, secretary, or the highest political office.

The party leader is often responsible for managing the party's relationship with the general public and leading the competition against political rivals, similar to the role of a party spokesperson. As such, they will take a leading role in developing and communicating party platforms to the electorate.

In many representative democracies, party leaders compete directly for high political office. It is thus typical in such states (notably in the Westminster system) for the party leader to seek election to the legislature and, if elected, to simultaneously serve as the party's parliamentary leader. In several countries utilizing the parliamentary system, if the party leader's political party emerges with a majority of seats in parliament after a general election, is the leading party in a coalition government, or (in some instances) is the largest party in a minority parliament, that party's leader often serves as the prime minister. Thus, in the politics of several countries utilizing the parliamentary system, a political party's leader is treated as a de facto candidate for prime minister by the media and the general public, even if said office is technically not directly elected.

Party Head or leader of a political party, subject to party's constitutional document need not be elected member of legislature and is therefore different from leader of parliamentary committee of a party.

This is much harder to do in presidential and semi-presidential systems, where the chief executive is a president who can only be removed by a special impeachment (typically involving a legislative supermajority, an investigation by a constitutional court, or both), and removal entails either a snap election or automatic succession to office by a vice president; therefore, the party's de jure internal leader either takes a background role (such as the Chairs of the Democratic, and Republican parties in the United States, who serve more so as the chief administrative officers of their respective political parties), or the leadership may be automatically bestowed on an incumbent president who belongs to the party (such as the Democratic Progressive Party in Taiwan). In countries using the Westminster system, the leader of the largest political party not within the government serves as the leader of the opposition.

== Examples ==
=== Canada ===
In Canada, the leaders of all major political parties are chosen during their respective political party's leadership conventions upon the completion of a leadership election. Exceptions to this process sometimes occur when Members of Parliament leave their former party to form a new party; examples of this include when Jean-François Fortin quit the Bloc Québécois to form Strength in Democracy in 2014 and when Maxime Bernier quit the Conservative Party to form the People's Party of Canada in 2018.

=== Mainland China ===
The leaders of communist parties often hold the title of general secretary (e.g. General Secretary of the Communist Party of the Soviet Union and General Secretary of the Chinese Communist Party) and the officeholder is usually considered the paramount leader of China. On 15 November 2012, Xi Jinping was elected General Secretary of the Chinese Communist Party at the 18th Communist Party national congress.

=== Germany ===
The party organizations themselves and also their representatives (such as the chairperson, who is the party leader, and other board members) play a much more prominent role in German politics than they do in many other countries, where the parties are mainly represented by their members and leaders in government. Although the party leaders often also hold important public offices (such as government minister or parliamentary leader), those roles are clearly separated, even by law. Consequently, it does occasionally happen that the leaders of a German party are not even members of parliament, such as Bärbel Bas and Lars Klingbeil, who are incumbent the chairpersons of the (governing) Social Democrats. This sometimes leads to open conflicts between the party leadership, its parliamentary group and its members of government.

=== Kazakhstan ===
In Kazakhstan, a political party is typically led by a party chairman, whose election and responsibilities are defined by the party’s charter rather than national law. The Article 8 of the Law on Political Parties (2002) allows party members to elect leaders but does not mandate titles, term lengths, or the existence of deputy chairmen. Certain public officials, including judges, military personnel, and law enforcement officers, are constitutionally barred from party membership and leadership. In practice, major parties such as Amanat elect their chairman and any deputy chairmen at a party congress or internal party meeting, according to rules set out in the party's statutes.

=== Netherlands ===
In the Netherlands, the party leaders are the most senior politicians within the political parties in the Netherlands. The leaders outwardly act as the 'figurehead' and the main representative of the party. Within the party, they must ensure political consensus. At election time the leader is always the Lijsttrekker (top candidate) of the party list. Outside election time the leaders most often serve as Parliamentary leader of their party in the House of Representatives, some party leaders opt to serve in the cabinet as a minister.

=== South Korea ===
In the Republic of Korea, Representatives of most political parties are elected through elections of party members. The representative of the Democratic Party of Korea is Song Young-gil, who was elected in May 2021, and the representative of the conservative opposition PPP is Lee Jun-seok, a famous young politician who was elected in June 2021. In the Democratic party's presidential election, it is also elected through public opinion polls, not party members. For the PPP, however, they calculate the public opinion poll and the party member poll by 50:50.

=== Taiwan ===
The major political parties in Taiwan are the Democratic Progressive Party and the Kuomintang.

The Democratic Progress Party's constitution stipulates that the President may serve directly as Party Chairman without an election during the ruling period, and that the Party Chairman is elected by party members during the opposition period. The Party constitution of the Kuomintang provides that the party chairman is directly elected by party members.

The current chairman of the Democratic Progressive Party is President Lai Ching-te. The current chairman of the Kuomintang is former Vice Premier Eric Chu.

=== Turkey ===
In Turkey, the party chairpersons are the de facto party leaders. The leaders of all major political parties are chosen during their respective political party's leadership conventions upon the completion of a leadership election. Exceptions to this process sometimes occur when Members of Parliament leave their former party to form a new party. It is possible to co-chair a party. The party leader is the most prominent politician of the party and is usually considered to become the head of government. However, a party leader may also put forward a different candidate for the elections. The party leader (chairperson) can not be the same as the party's General Secretary.

=== United Kingdom ===
The method of selection of the party leader varies from party to party, though often it will involve an election involving all or part of the party membership. In some parties, only incumbent members of the parliamentary party, or particular party office-holders, may vote; in others, such as the British Labour Party, though the entire membership is eligible to vote, some electors may have a much larger share of the vote than others (see also Superdelegate for a similar concept). If only one candidate emerges, they are said to be "elected by acclamation" or "ratified" by the general membership (sometimes the term "anointed" occurs informally or in media discourse).

Sir Keir Starmer is leader of the Labour Party and Prime Minister, while Kemi Badenoch was elected the leader of the Conservative Party, and thus Leader of the Opposition, in November 2024.

=== United States ===
If elected, political parties have party leaders in the executive branch of the United States government. The President becomes the de facto leader of their respective political party once elected, and the Vice President likewise holds a leadership role as both the second-highest executive officer and the President of the Senate. However, major parties also generally have a National Committee as their governing body, which has separate leadership roles.

The legislative branch, otherwise known as the United States Congress, is made up of the upper chamber, the Senate, and the lower chamber, the House of Representatives, with party-elected leaders in each. The leader of the party with most of the representation (sometimes called the party-in-power) in each case is known as the majority leader, whereas the leader of the opposing party with the most members is known as the minority leader.

Party leaders in the United States Senate have been elected by their respective political parties' caucuses since 1913. They include President of the Senate JD Vance, President Pro Tempore of the United States Senate Chuck Grassley, Senate Majority Leader John Thune and Senate Majority Whip John Barrasso on the Republican side, and Senate Minority Leader Chuck Schumer and Senate Minority Whip Dick Durbin on the Democratic side.

The party leaders of the House of Representatives are elected by their respective parties in the House by secret ballot. The Republican Party is represented in the House by Speaker of the House of Representatives Mike Johnson, whereas the Democratic Party is represented by Minority Leader Hakeem Jeffries. In the House of Representatives, the most powerful official is the House-elected Speaker.

Ken Martin serves as the chair of the Democratic Party, while Joe Gruters serves as the chair of the Republican Party.

== See also ==
- Party secretary
- Party chair
