= Alfred Belzile =

Canadian politician (1907–1994)

Member of the Canadian Parliament for Matapédia—Matane
- In office 1958–1963
- Preceded by: Léandre Thibault
- Succeeded by: René Tremblay

Personal details
- Born: August 24, 1907 Amqui, Quebec, Canada
- Died: August 18, 1994 (aged 86) Sainte-Foy, Quebec City, Quebec
- Party: Progressive Conservative Party
- Occupation: farmer

J.-Alfred Belzile (August 24, 1907 – August 18, 1994) was a Canadian politician and farmer.

Born in Amqui, Quebec, Canada, he was elected to the House of Commons of Canada in 1958 as a Member of the Progressive Conservative Party to represent the riding of Matapédia—Matane. He was re-elected in 1962 but defeated in 1963. He was also defeated in 1957.
