= Léandre Thibault =

Canadian politician

Member of Parliament for Matapédia—Matane
- In office August 1953 – February 1958

Personal details
- Born: 9 June 1899 Baie-des-Sables, Quebec, Canada
- Died: 19 December 1971 (aged 72)
- Party: Liberal
- Profession: automobile dealer, building contractor, industrialist

Léandre Thibault (9 June 1899 – 19 December 1971) was a Canadian automobile dealer, building contractor and industrialist. He served as a Liberal party member of the House of Commons of Canada. He was born in Baie-des-Sables, Quebec.

He was first elected at the Matapédia—Matane riding in the 1953 general election and re-elected for a second term in 1957. After completing that term, the 23rd Canadian Parliament, Thibault left federal office and did not seek re-election in 1958.

Thibault was also a Mayor of Matane, Quebec. He died prior to September 1989.
