= Avignon—La Mitis—Matane—Matapédia =

Federal electoral district in Quebec, Canada

Quebec electoral district

Federal electoral district
- Legislature: House of Commons
MP
Kristina Michaud
Bloc Québécois
- District created: 2013
- District abolished: 2023
- First contested: 2015
- Last contested: 2021
- District webpage: profile, map

Demographics
- Population (2016): 71,897
- Electors (2019): 59,533
- Area (km²): 14,461.67
- Pop. density (per km²): 5
- Census division(s): Avignon, La Matanie, La Matapédia, La Mitis
- Census subdivision(s): Matane, Mont-Joli, Amqui, Carleton-sur-Mer, Sainte-Luce, Maria, Causapscal, Listuguj, Nouvelle, Price

Avignon—La Mitis—Matane—Matapédia was a federal electoral district in Quebec. It encompasses a portion of Quebec previously included in the electoral districts of Gaspésie—Îles-de-la-Madeleine (21%) and Haute-Gaspésie—La Mitis—Matane—Matapédia (79%).

== Profile ==
The Bloc did the best, with results from the 2011 election transposed onto the new riding boundaries from the redistribution. Their stronghold in the riding is in and around Mont-Joli, and for the most part, they carried the rural areas, particularly in the northern portion of the district. The NDP's strength was in the south, in the part of the new riding taken from Gaspésie—Îles-de-la-Madeleine. The area around Amqui offered the most diverse range of support, with all parties doing fairly well, but with the Bloc coming out on top. Matane, and the rural regions surrounding it, were the best portions of the seat for the Liberals, although they had to contend with strong support for the Bloc as well.

== Demographics ==
According to the 2016 Canadian census

- Languages (2016 mother tongue) : 95.8% French, 3.3% English, 0.6% Mi'kmaq, 0.1% Arabic, 0.1% Spanish

== History ==
Avignon—La Mitis—Matane—Matapédia was created by the 2012 federal electoral boundaries redistribution and was legally defined in the 2013 representation order. It came into effect upon the call of the 42nd Canadian federal election, which took place October 19, 2015.

The 2022 federal electoral boundaries redistribution eliminated one electoral district in the Bas-Saint-Laurent and Gaspésie, citing large deviations from the provincial population quota for ridings in the region. The Boundaries Commission refused requests from local politicians and constituents to invoke the "extraordinary circumstances" provision of the Electoral Boundaries Readjustment Act. Consequently, the 2023 representation order for Quebec abolished Avignon—La Mitis—Matane—Matapédia and divided its territory between the neighbouring ridings of Gaspésie—Les Îles-de-la-Madeleine and Rimouski-Neigette—Témiscouata—Les Basques.

=== Members of Parliament ===
This riding has elected the following members of Parliament:

Parliament	Years	Member	Party
Avignon—La Mitis—Matane—Matapédia; Riding created from Gaspésie—Îles-de-la-Madeleine and Haute-Gaspésie—La Mitis—Matane—Matapédia
42nd	2015–2019	Rémi Massé	Liberal
43rd	2019–2021	Kristina Michaud	Bloc Québécois
44th	2021–2025	Kristina Michaud	Bloc Québécois
Riding dissolved into Gaspésie—Les Îles-de-la-Madeleine—Listuguj and Rimouski—La Matapédia

== Election results ==
Graph of election results in Avignon—La Mitis—Matane—Matapédia (parties that never received at least 2% of the vote are omitted)

2021 Canadian federal election
Party	Candidate	Votes	%	±%	Expenditures
Bloc Québécois	Kristina Michaud	19,776	59.8	+8.4	$16,310.64
Liberal	Louis-Éric Savoie	7,095	21.5	-12.4	$8,914.34
Conservative	Germain Dumas	2,912	8.8	+1.1	$49.64
New Democratic	Christel Marchand	1,501	4.5	+0.5	$24.77
People's	Éric Barnabé	965	2.9	+2.3	$0.00
Free	Mélanie Gendron	826	2.5	N/A	$1,224.47
Total valid votes/expense limit		33,075	98.0	–	$109,234.41
Total rejected ballots		680	2.0		
Turnout		33,755	57.6		
Registered voters		58,626			
Bloc Québécois hold		Swing		+10.4	
Source: Elections Canada

2019 Canadian federal election
Party	Candidate	Votes	%	±%	Expenditures
Bloc Québécois	Kristina Michaud	18,500	51.43	+30.41	$17,758.63
Liberal	Rémi Massé	12,188	33.89	-5.66	none listed
Conservative	Natasha Tremblay	2,756	7.66	+1.53	none listed
New Democratic	Rémi-Jocelyn Côté	1,435	3.99	-16.20	$1,497.40
Green	James Morrison	699	1.94	+0.94	none listed
People's	Éric Barnabé	210	0.58	-	$0.00
Rhinoceros	Mathieu Castonguay	180	0.50	+0.02	none listed
Total valid votes/expense limit		35,968	98.38		
Total rejected ballots		591	1.62	+0.49	
Turnout		36,559	61.41	+1.02	
Eligible voters		59,533			
Bloc Québécois gain from Liberal		Swing		+18.04	
Source: Elections Canada

2015 Canadian federal election
Party	Candidate	Votes	%	±%	Expenditures
Liberal	Rémi Massé	14,378	39.55	+16.34	$63,694.54
Bloc Québécois	Kédina Fleury-Samson	7,641	21.02	-13.47	$33,559.21
New Democratic	Joël Charest	7,340	20.19	-6.44	$14,775.78
Strength in Democracy	Jean-François Fortin	4,229	11.63	-	$23,500.51
Conservative	André Savoie	2,228	6.13	-7.03	$4,967.68
Green	Sherri Springle	365	1.0	-1.51	-
Rhinoceros	Éric Normand	175	0.48	-	-
Total valid votes/Expense limit		36,356	100.00	-	$209,811.36
Total rejected ballots		416	-	-	
Turnout		36,772	-	-	
Eligible voters		60,801			
Liberal gain from Bloc Québécois		Swing		+14.90	
Source: Elections Canada

2011 federal election redistributed results
Party	Vote	%
Bloc Québécois	12,599	34.49
New Democratic	9,725	26.63
Liberal	8,477	23.21
Conservative	4,806	13.16
Green	918	2.51

== See also ==
- List of Canadian electoral districts
- Historical federal electoral districts of Canada
