= René Tremblay =

Canadian politician

The Honourable René Tremblay PC

Member of the Canadian Parliament for Matapédia—Matane
- In office 1963–1968
- Preceded by: Alfred Belzile
- Succeeded by: The electoral district was abolished in 1966.

Personal details
- Born: November 12, 1922 Luceville, Quebec
- Died: January 22, 1968 (aged 45)
- Party: Liberal
- Cabinet: Minister Without Portfolio (1963–1964); Minister of Citizenship and Immigration (1964–1965); Postmaster General (1965)

René Tremblay, PC (November 12, 1922 – January 22, 1968) was a Canadian politician.

Born in Luceville, Quebec, he was first elected to the House of Commons of Canada representing the riding of Matapédia—Matane in the 1963 federal election. A Liberal, he was re-elected in 1965. From 1963 to 1964, he was a Minister without Portfolio. From 1964 to 1965, he was the Minister of Citizenship and Immigration. In 1965, he was the Postmaster General. He died of a heart attack at the age of forty-five on Monday, January 22, 1968.
