= Quebec Route 297 =

Highway in Quebec, Canada

Route 297

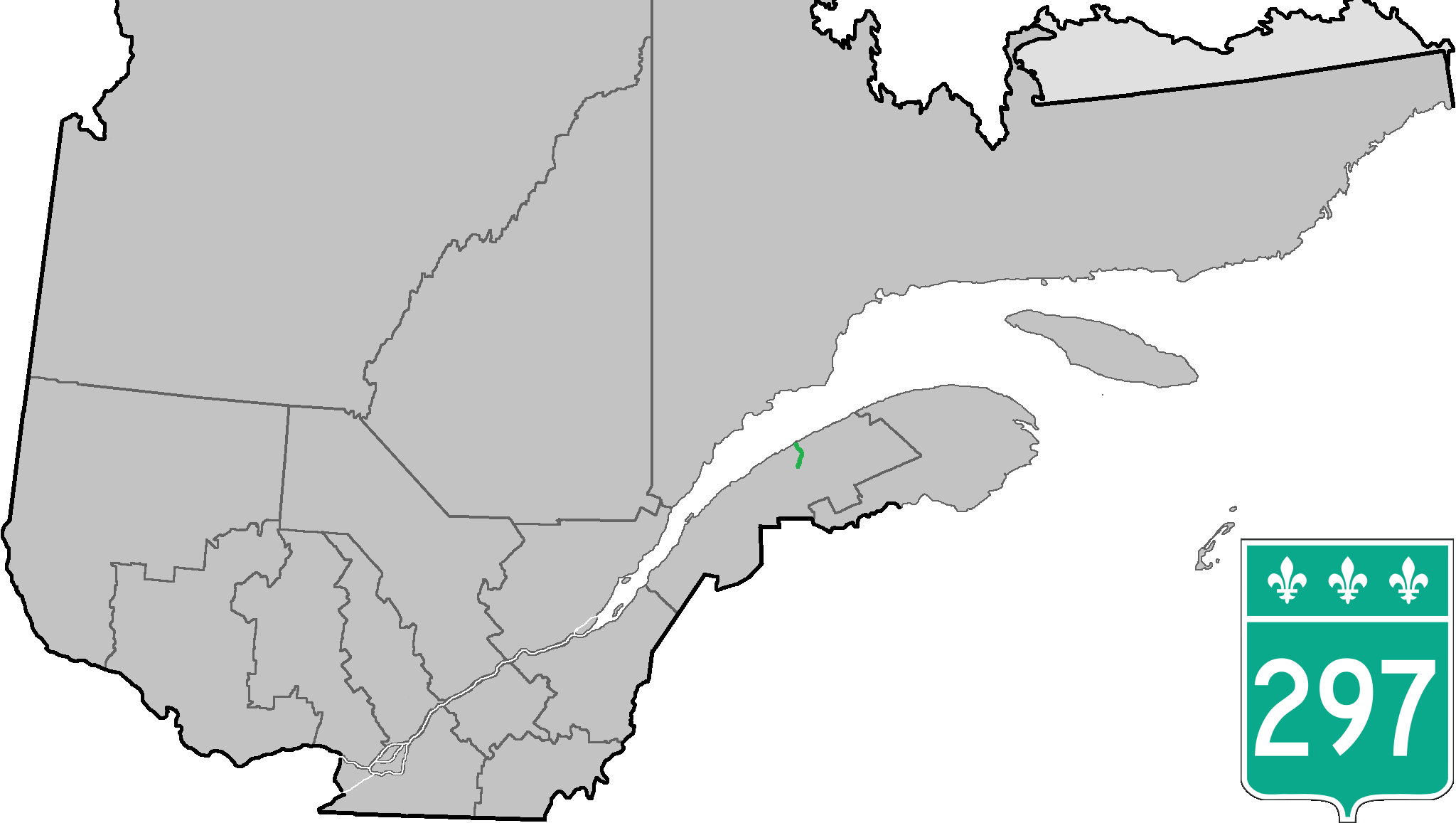

Route information
- Length: 25 km (16 mi)

Major junctions
- South end: R-132 in Saint-Moïse
- North end: R-132 in Baie-des-Sables

Location
- Country: Canada
- Province: Quebec
- Major cities: Baie-des-Sables, Saint-Moise

Highway system
- Quebec provincial highways; Autoroutes; List; Former
← R-296	→ R-298

Route 297 is short 25 km two-lane north/south highway in Quebec, Canada, which starts in Baie-des-Sables at the junction of Route 132 and ends in Saint-Moïse. The highway acts mainly as a shortcut between Baie-des-Sables and the southern section of Route 132 which leads to the Matapédia River Valley and the southern part of the Gaspé Peninsula.

== Municipalities along Route 297 ==
Municipalities listed from south to north:

- Saint-Moïse
- Saint-Noël
- Saint-Damase
- Baie-des-Sables

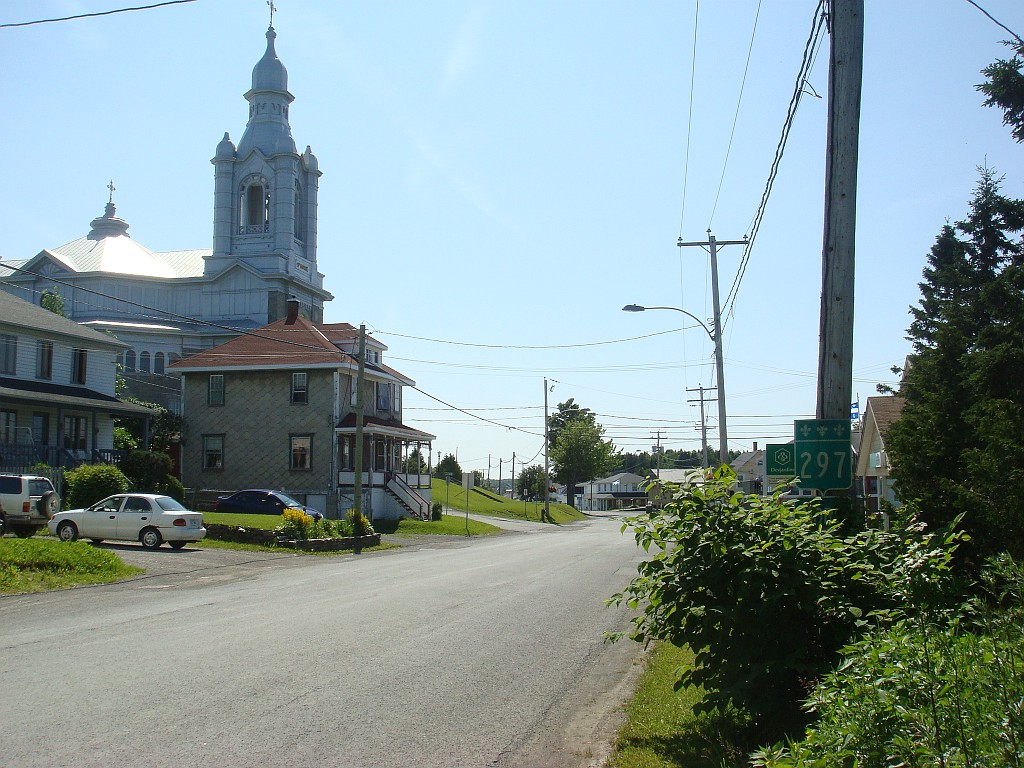
Route 297 in Saint-Moïse

== See also ==
- List of Quebec provincial highways
