= Jean-Luc Joncas =

Canadian politician

Jean-Luc Joncas (born 16 December 1936) was a Progressive Conservative member of the House of Commons of Canada. He was a businessman by career.

Born in Amqui, Quebec, Joncas represented the Quebec riding of Matapédia—Matane where he was first elected in the 1984 federal election and re-elected in 1988, therefore becoming a member in the 33rd and 34th Canadian Parliaments.

Joncas left federal politics after his defeat in the 1993 federal election by René Canuel of the Bloc Québécois.

== Controversy for Claiming Milage as an MP ==
In 1988, Joncas was the subject of controversy after allegations he and his family inappropriately claimed milage for his travel to and from Ottawa. These allegations appeared in the Montreal Gazette in November 1988.

== Electoral record ==
1993 Canadian federal election: Haute-Gaspésie—La Mitis—Matane—Matapédia
Party	Candidate	Votes	%	±%	Expenditures
Bloc Québécois	René Canuel	18,331	57.33		$23,993
Liberal	Maurice Gauthier	10,410	32.55	–	$44,410
Progressive Conservative	Jean-Luc Joncas	2,448	7.66		$34,058
Natural Law	Pierre Gauthier	570	1.78		$0
New Democratic	Robert McKoy	218	0.68		$0
Total valid votes/expense limit		31,977	100.00	–	$54,749
Total rejected ballots		618			
Turnout		32,595	71.76		
Electors on the lists		45,421			
Source: Thirty-fifth General Election, 1993: Official Voting Results, Published by the Chief Electoral Officer of Canada. Financial figures taken from official contributions and expenses provided by Elections Canada.
