= Rémi Massé =

Canadian politician

Member of Parliament for Avignon—La Mitis—Matane—Matapédia
- In office October 19, 2015 – October 21, 2019
- Preceded by: Jean-François Fortin
- Succeeded by: Kristina Michaud

Personal details
- Born: Rivière-du-Loup, Quebec, Canada
- Party: Liberal

Rémi Massé is a Canadian politician who represented the riding of Avignon—La Mitis—Matane—Matapédia in the House of Commons of Canada in the 2015 federal election until 2019. He ran again in 2025.

== Electoral record ==
2025 Canadian federal election: Côte-du-Sud—Rivière-du-Loup—Kataskomiq—Témiscouata
Party	Candidate	Votes	%	±%
Conservative	Bernard Généreux	28,873	45.84	+0.95
Liberal	Rémi Massé	19,097	30.32	+11.26
Bloc Québécois	Diane Sénécal	12,598	20.00	-9.81
New Democratic	Iseult L'Heureux Hubert	1,072	1.70	-1.68
Green	Alexie Plourde	682	1.08	N/A
People's	Jean-François Morin	464	0.74	+0.38
Rhinoceros	Thibaud Mony	206	0.33	-0.20
Total valid votes/expense limit		62,992	98.49	
Total rejected ballots		967	1.51	-0.48
Turnout		63,959	66.80	+5.28
Eligible voters		95,745		
Conservative notional hold		Swing		-5.16
Source: Elections Canada
Note: number of eligible voters does not include voting day registrations.

2019 Canadian federal election: Avignon—La Mitis—Matane—Matapédia
Party	Candidate	Votes	%	±%	Expenditures
Bloc Québécois	Kristina Michaud	18,500	51.43	+30.41	$17,758.63
Liberal	Rémi Massé	12,188	33.89	-5.66	none listed
Conservative	Natasha Tremblay	2,756	7.66	+1.53	none listed
New Democratic	Rémi-Jocelyn Côté	1,435	3.99	-16.20	$1,497.40
Green	James Morrison	699	1.94	+0.94	none listed
People's	Éric Barnabé	210	0.58	-	$0.00
Rhinoceros	Mathieu Castonguay	180	0.50	+0.02	none listed
Total valid votes/expense limit		35,968	98.38		
Total rejected ballots		591	1.62	+0.49	
Turnout		36,559	61.41	+1.02	
Eligible voters		59,533			
Bloc Québécois gain from Liberal		Swing		+18.04	
Source: Elections Canada

2015 Canadian federal election: Avignon—La Mitis—Matane—Matapédia
Party	Candidate	Votes	%	±%	Expenditures
Liberal	Rémi Massé	14,378	39.55	+16.34	$63,694.54
Bloc Québécois	Kédina Fleury-Samson	7,641	21.02	-13.47	$33,559.21
New Democratic	Joël Charest	7,340	20.19	-6.44	$14,775.78
Strength in Democracy	Jean-François Fortin	4,229	11.63	-	$23,500.51
Conservative	André Savoie	2,228	6.13	-7.03	$4,967.68
Green	Sherri Springle	365	1.0	-1.51	-
Rhinoceros	Éric Normand	175	0.48	-	-
Total valid votes/Expense limit		36,356	100.00	-	$209,811.36
Total rejected ballots		416	-	-	
Turnout		36,772	-	-	
Eligible voters		60,801			
Liberal gain from Bloc Québécois		Swing		+14.90	
Source: Elections Canada
