= 2014 Bloc Québécois leadership election =

Political party leadership election in Canada

- June 14, 2014
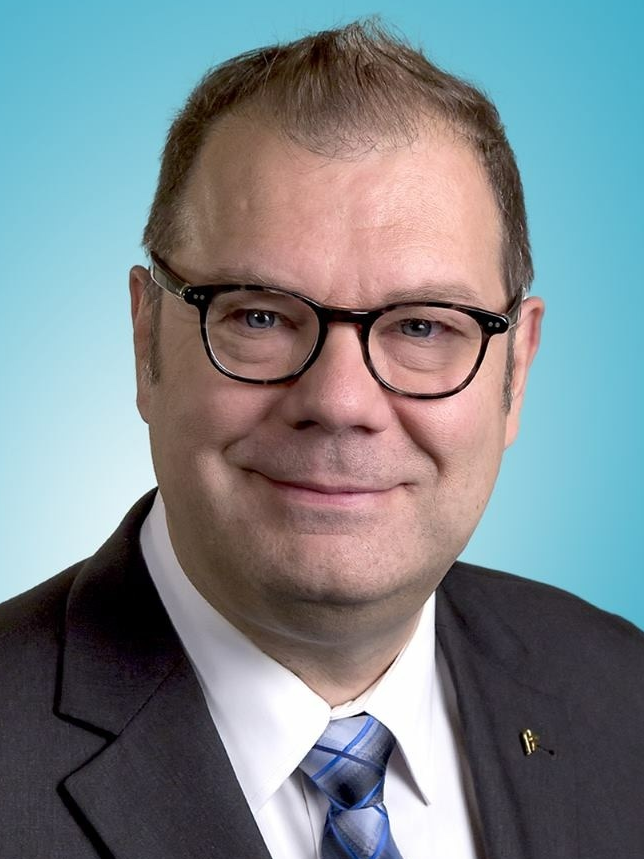
		AB
Candidate	Mario Beaulieu	André Bellavance
Riding	N/A	Richmond—Arthabaska
Votes	5,947	5,168
Percentage	53.5%	46.5%
Leader before election
Vacant
Elected Leader
Mario Beaulieu

2014 Bloc Québécois leadership election
- Date: June 14, 2014
- Resigning leader: Daniel Paillé
- Won by: Mario Beaulieu
- Ballots: 1
- Candidates: 2
- Entrance fee: $15,000

The 2014 Bloc Québécois leadership election was held June 14, 2014 to choose a successor for Daniel Paillé who resigned on December 16, 2013 for health reasons.

Voter turnout in the election was 58.5%, up from the 2011 leadership election, with approximately 19,000 members voted by telephone to elect Daniel Paillé's successor.

== Timeline ==
=== 2013 ===
- February 27 – Jonquière—Alma MP Claude Patry leaves the New Democratic Party caucus to join the Bloc Québécois.
- September 12 – Ahuntsic MP Maria Mourani is expelled from the Bloc Québécois caucus due to comments against the provincial Parti Québécois government's proposed Quebec Charter of Values.
- December 16 – Paillé resigns the leadership and presidency due to health concerns. Richmond—Arthabaska MP André Bellavance is named interim parliamentary leader, and vice-president Annie Lessard is named the interim president.

=== 2014 ===
- February 22 – Bellavance announces his candidacy.
- February 26 – Bellavance resigns as parliamentary leader, and Haute-Gaspésie—La Mitis—Matane—Matapédia MP Jean-François Fortin is named interim parliamentary leader.
- April 8 – Official start to the leadership race.
- May 7 – Last date for candidates to submit $15,000 entry fee and for candidates to file a nomination form signed by a total of at least 1,000 party members from across at least 25 ridings.
- May 15 – Deadline for membership and renewals.
- May 24 – Candidates debate during BQ policy convention in Rimouski.
- June 11–13 – Party members vote by telephone.
- June 14 – The winner of the leadership election announced.
- June 23–25 – The party holds a convention in Rimouski, where the new leader officially assumes the leadership of the party.

== Official candidates ==
Candidates who have submitted the $15,000 registration fee and 1,000 signatures gathered from at least 25 ridings.

=== Mario Beaulieu ===
Background

- Leader of the Société Saint-Jean-Baptiste (2009–2014).

Positions

Bealieu argues that the BQ should more strongly emphasize Quebec independence and accuses Bellavance of wanting to water down sovereignty to win votes.

Date campaign announced: April 28, 2014
Date officially registered: May 7, 2014
Endorsements

- Prominent individuals: Bernard Landry, former Premier of Quebec; Djemila Benhabib, essayist and former Parti Québécois candidate; Lucie Laurier, actress; national executive of the Forum jeunesse du Bloc Québécois (Bloc Quebecois youth wing); Xavier Barsalou-Duval, Bloc youth wing president; Yves Beauchemin, author

=== André Bellavance ===
Background

- MP for Richmond—Arthabaska (2004–2015)
- Leader of the party in the House of Commons (2013–2014)

Positions

Has said that for the Bloc to revive itself it must become more than a coalition of sovereigntists.

Date campaign announced: February 22, 2014
Date officially registered: May 5, 2014
Endorsements

- MPs: (3) Jean-François Fortin, Haute-Gaspésie—La Mitis—Matane—Matapédia; Claude Patry, Jonquière—Alma; Louis Plamondon, Bas-Richelieu—Nicolet—Bécancour
- Former MPs: Daniel Turp
- Others: Vivian Barbot, former president of the party; and some 30 former Bloc MPs

== Declined ==
- Pierre Curzi, former MNA for Borduas (2007–2012)
- Gilles Duceppe, former MP for Laurier—Sainte-Marie (1990–2011) and Bloc Québécois leader (1997–2011)
- Pierre Duchesne, former Quebec Minister of Higher Education and MNA for Borduas (2012–2014)
- Jean-François Fortin, MP for Haute-Gaspésie—La Mitis—Matane—Matapédia
- Bernard Landry, former Premier of Quebec (2001–2003)
- Pierre Paquette, former MP for Joliette (2000–2011)
- Daniel Turp, former MP for Beauharnois—Salaberry (1997–2000) and MNA for Mercier (2003–2008).

== Results ==
Support by Ballot
Candidate	1st ballot	
Candidate	Votes cast	%
Mario Beaulieu	5,947	53.5%
André Bellavance	5,168	46.5%
Total	TBA	100.0%

== See also ==
- 2011 Bloc Québécois leadership election
- 42nd Canadian federal election
