= Arthur-Joseph Lapointe =

Canadian politician (1895–1960)

Member of Parliament for Matapédia—Matane
- In office 14 October 1935 – 10 June 1945
- Preceded by: riding created
- Succeeded by: Philéas Côté

Personal details
- Born: 13 February 1895 Saint-Ulric, Quebec, Canada
- Died: 5 January 1960 (aged 64)
- Party: Liberal
- Spouse(s): Anna Marie Ducharme m. 15 June 1921
- Relatives: Ernest Lapointe (uncle)
- Profession: station agent

Arthur-Joseph Lapointe (13 February 1895 – 5 January 1960) was a Liberal party member of the House of Commons of Canada. He was born in Saint-Ulric, Quebec in Matane County and became a railway station agent by career.

Lapointe was educated at seminary in Rimouski. He served in the military during World War I with postings at France and Belgium, attaining a rank of Lieutenant.

He was first elected to Parliament at the Matapédia—Matane riding in the 1935 general election and re-elected there in 1940. After completing his second term in the House of Commons, Lapointe did not seek another term in the 1945 federal election.
