= Kristina Michaud =

Canadian politician (born 1993)

Member of Parliament for Avignon—La Mitis—Matane—Matapédia
- In office October 21, 2019 – March 23, 2025
- Preceded by: Rémi Massé
- Succeeded by: Riding dissolved

Personal details
- Born: February 1, 1993 (age 33) Amqui, Quebec
- Party: Bloc Québécois
- Website: https://www.kristinamichaud.quebec/

Kristina Michaud (born February 1, 1993) is a Canadian politician who was elected as a Bloc Québécois member of the House of Commons of Canada in 2019. She represented the riding of Avignon—La Mitis—Matane—Matapédia. She did not seek re-election in 2025.

== Political career ==
Since 2021 she has served as the critic of climate change, youth, public safety and emergency preparedness in the Bloc Québécois Shadow Cabinet.

On January 27, 2025, she announced she would stand down at the 2025 Canadian federal election.

== Electoral results ==
2021 Canadian federal election: Avignon—La Mitis—Matane—Matapédia
Party	Candidate	Votes	%	±%	Expenditures
Bloc Québécois	Kristina Michaud	19,776	59.8	+8.4	$16,310.64
Liberal	Louis-Éric Savoie	7,095	21.5	-12.4	$8,914.34
Conservative	Germain Dumas	2,912	8.8	+1.1	$49.64
New Democratic	Christel Marchand	1,501	4.5	+0.5	$24.77
People's	Éric Barnabé	965	2.9	+2.3	$0.00
Free	Mélanie Gendron	826	2.5	N/A	$1,224.47
Total valid votes/expense limit		33,075	98.0	–	$109,234.41
Total rejected ballots		680	2.0		
Turnout		33,755	57.6		
Registered voters		58,626			
Bloc Québécois hold		Swing		+10.4	
Source: Elections Canada

2019 Canadian federal election: Avignon—La Mitis—Matane—Matapédia
Party	Candidate	Votes	%	±%	Expenditures
Bloc Québécois	Kristina Michaud	18,500	51.43	+30.41	$17,758.63
Liberal	Rémi Massé	12,188	33.89	-5.66	none listed
Conservative	Natasha Tremblay	2,756	7.66	+1.53	none listed
New Democratic	Rémi-Jocelyn Côté	1,435	3.99	-16.20	$1,497.40
Green	James Morrison	699	1.94	+0.94	none listed
People's	Éric Barnabé	210	0.58	-	$0.00
Rhinoceros	Mathieu Castonguay	180	0.50	+0.02	none listed
Total valid votes/expense limit		35,968	98.38		
Total rejected ballots		591	1.62	+0.49	
Turnout		36,559	61.41	+1.02	
Eligible voters		59,533			
Bloc Québécois gain from Liberal		Swing		+18.04	
Source: Elections Canada
