= Jean-Yves Roy =

Canadian politician

Member of Parliament for Haute-Gaspésie—La Mitis—Matane—Matapédia (Matapédia—Matane; 2000–2004)
- In office November 27, 2000 – October 22, 2010
- Preceded by: René Canuel
- Succeeded by: Jean-François Fortin (2011)

Personal details
- Born: July 21, 1949 (age 76) Saint-Charles-Garnier, Quebec, Canada
- Party: Bloc Québécois
- Profession: Teacher

Jean-Yves Roy (born July 21, 1949) is a retired Canadian politician. He was a Bloc Québécois member of the House of Commons of Canada from the 2000 election until his resignation in 2010.

== Political career ==
Born in Saint-Charles-Garnier, Quebec, Roy represented the districts of Matapédia—Matane until 2006 and then Haute-Gaspésie—La Mitis—Matane—Matapédia for the following four years. Prior to being elected he was a teacher. He is the Bloc's Fisheries and Oceans critic. He was a city councillor in Pointe-au-Père, Quebec in 1981, and he was mayor from 1982 to 1986.

Roy resigned from the House effective October 22, 2010 after having been largely absent from the House of Commons. He had been asked by Bloc leader Gilles Duceppe to make a decision as to his future due to his prolonged absences and announced in September that he would wait until after the Commons voted on a private members bill to abolish the long gun registry to resign so that he could vote for the registry's retention.
