= Matane (federal electoral district) =

Former federal electoral district in Quebec, Canada

Quebec electoral district

Defunct federal electoral district
- Legislature: House of Commons
- District created: 1966
- District abolished: 1976
- First contested: 1968
- Last contested: 1974

Matane (French pronunciation: [matan]) was a federal electoral district in Quebec, Canada, that was represented in the House of Commons of Canada from 1917 to 1935, and from 1968 to 1979.

This riding was created in 1914 from parts of Rimouski riding. It consisted of the part of the county of Rimouski east of the Métis River excluding the part of the parish of St. Angèle de Mérici east of the Métis River. In 1924, it was redefined to consist of the Counties of Matane and Matapédia.

The electoral district was abolished in 1933 when it was redistributed between Gaspé and Matapédia—Matane ridings.

It was recreated in 1966 from parts of those two ridings. The new riding consisted of:

- the Towns of Amqui and Matane;
- the County of Matane (except the village municipality of Price, the parish municipality of Saint-Octave-de-Métis, and the municipality of Grand-Métis);
- in the County of Gaspé West: the village municipality of Cap-Chat, the parish municipality of Saint-Norbert-du-Cap-Chat, the Townships of Cap-Chat and Romieu without local municipal organization; and
- in the County of Matapédia: the village municipalities of Causapscal and Lac-au-Saumon; the parish municipalities of Saint-Alexandre-des-Lacs, Saint-Benoît-Joseph-Labre, Saint-Damase, Saint-Jacques-le-Majeur-de-Causapscal, Saint-Jean-Baptiste-Vianney, Saint-Léon-le-Grand, Saint-Raphaël-d'Albertville, Saint-Tharcisius and Saint-Zénon-du-Lac-Humqui; the municipalities of Saint-Edmond, Sainte-Florence and Sainte-Marguerite; the territory without local municipal organization comprising the Townships of Casault, Catalogne, Clark, Gravier, part of the Townships of Blais, Jetté, La Vérendrye, Matalic, the Seigniory of Lac-Matapédia, and that part of the Seigniory of Lac-Mitis bounded on the northwest by the prolongation of the line separating the Townships of Nemtayé and Pinault to the southwestern limit of the County of Matapédia.

The electoral district was abolished in 1976 when it was redistributed into Gaspé, Matapédia—Matane and Bonaventure—Îles-de-la-Madeleine and ridings.

== Members of Parliament ==
This riding elected the following members of Parliament:

Parliament	Years	Member	Party
Matane; Riding created from Rimouski
13th	1917–1921	François-Jean Pelletier	Opposition (Laurier Liberals)
14th	1921–1925	François-Jean Pelletier	Liberal
14th	1925–1926	Georges Dionne	Liberal
15th	1926–1930	Georges Dionne	Liberal
16th	1930–1935	Henri LaRue	Conservative
Riding dissolved into Gaspé and Matapédia—Matane
Riding re-created from Gaspé and Matapédia—Matane
28th	1968–1972	Pierre de Bané	Liberal
29th	1972–1974	Pierre de Bané	Liberal
30th	1974–1979	Pierre de Bané	Liberal
Riding dissolved into Gaspé, Matapédia—Matane and Bonaventure—Îles-de-la-Madeleine

== Election results ==
=== Matane, 1917–1935 ===
1917 Canadian federal election
Party	Candidate	Votes
Opposition (Laurier Liberals)	François-Jean Pelletier	5,010
Government (Unionist)	Herménégilde Boulay	447

1921 Canadian federal election
Party	Candidate	Votes
Liberal	François-Jean Pelletier	8,105
Conservative	Herménégilde Boulay	2,252

1925 Canadian federal election
Party	Candidate	Votes
Liberal	Georges-Léonidas Dionne	7,660
Conservative	Roméo Langlais	3,884

1926 Canadian federal election
Party	Candidate	Votes
Liberal	Georges-Léonidas Dionne	8,880
Conservative	Nazaire Bégin	3,727

1930 Canadian federal election
Party	Candidate	Votes
Conservative	Joseph-Ernest-Henri LaRue	7,710
Liberal	Georges-Léonidas Dionne	6,975

=== Matane, 1968–1979 ===
1968 Canadian federal election
Party	Candidate	Votes
Liberal	Pierre de Bané	9,207
Progressive Conservative	Julien Chouinard	6,055
Ralliement créditiste	Ghislain Gagnon	1,159
New Democratic	Marcel Bureau	639

1972 Canadian federal election
Party	Candidate	Votes
Liberal	Pierre de Bané	10,038
Social Credit	Léonard Boulay	5,968
Progressive Conservative	Yvon Sirois	2,999

1974 Canadian federal election
Party	Candidate	Votes
Liberal	Pierre de Bané	11,194
Progressive Conservative	Jacques Lavoie	2,598
Social Credit	François Boulay	2,141
New Democratic	Mario Turbide	567

== See also ==
- List of Canadian electoral districts
- Historical federal electoral districts of Canada
