= Saint-Noël, Quebec =

Saint-Noël
- Village municipality
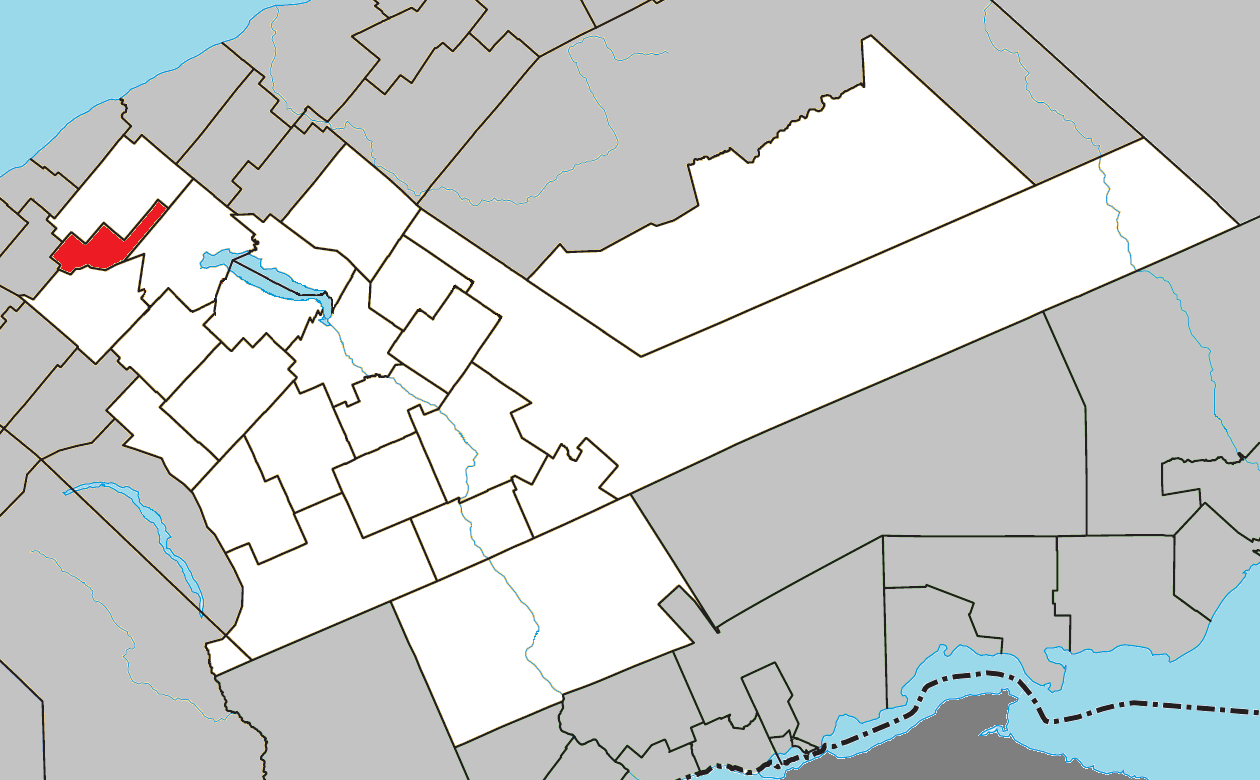
- Location within La Matapédia RCM

- Location in eastern Quebec
- Coordinates: 48°35′N 67°50′W
- Country: Canada
- Province: Quebec
- Region: Bas-Saint-Laurent
- RCM: La Matapédia
- Settled: 1880s
- Constituted: October 2, 1906
- Named for: Noël Chabanel

Government
  - Mayor: Gilbert Marquis
  - Fed. riding: Rimouski-Neigette—Mitis—Matapédia—Les Basques
  - Prov. riding: Matane-Matapédia-Mitis

Area
  - Total: 45.26 km^{2} (17.47 sq mi)
  - Land: 45.80 km^{2} (17.68 sq mi)
- There is an apparent discrepancy between 2 authoritative sources.

Population (2021)
  - Total: 392
  - Density: 8.6/km^{2} (22/sq mi)
  - Change 2016-21: ▼1.5%
  - Dwellings: 210
- Time zone: UTC−5 (EST)
  - Summer (DST): UTC−4 (EDT)
- Postal code(s): G0J 3A0
- Area codes: 418, 581
- Highways: R-297
- Website: www.st-noel.com

Saint-Noël (French pronunciation: [sɛ̃ nɔɛl]) is a village municipality in the Canadian province of Quebec, located in La Matapédia Regional County Municipality.

== History ==
In 1887, its post office opened, called Saint-Moïse-Station. In 1906, the Village Municipality of Saint-Moïse was created out of territory ceded by the parish municipalities of Saint-Moïse and Saint-Damase.

On June 16, 1946, the village municipality changed its name to Saint-Noël.

== Demographics ==
In the 2021 Census of Population conducted by Statistics Canada, Saint-Noël had a population of 392 living in 182 of its 210 total private dwellings, a change of −1.5% from its 2016 population of 398. With a land area of 45.8 km^{2} (17.7 sq mi), it had a population density of 8.6/km^{2} (22.2/sq mi) in 2021.

Canada census – Saint-Noël community profile

	2021	2016	2011
Population	392 (-1.5% from 2016)	398 (-8.3% from 2011)	434 (-5.4% from 2006)
Land area	45.80 km^{2} (17.68 sq mi)	45.85 km^{2} (17.70 sq mi)	45.27 km^{2} (17.48 sq mi)
Population density	8.6/km^{2} (22/sq mi)	8.7/km^{2} (23/sq mi)	9.6/km^{2} (25/sq mi)
Median age	48.0 (M: 48.0, F: 48.0)	49.2 (M: 49.9, F: 47.9)	45.5 (M: 46.3, F: 43.3)
Private dwellings	210 (total) 182 (occupied)	212 (total)	217 (total)
Median household income	$46,400	$39,381	$30,706

References: 2021 2016 2011

Historical census populations – Saint-Noël, Quebec

Year	Pop.	±%
1911	637	—
1921	791	+24.2%
1931	911	+15.2%
1941	836	−8.2%
1951	830	−0.7%
1956	1,027	+23.7%
1961	1,124	+9.4%

Year	Pop.	±%
1966	976	−13.2%
1971	910	−6.8%
1976	777	−14.6%
1981	666	−14.3%
1986	612	−8.1%
1991	508	−17.0%
1996	509	+0.2%

Year	Pop.	±%
2001	493	−3.1%
2006	459	−6.9%
2011	434	−5.4%
2016	398	−8.3%
2021	392	−1.5%

Source: Statistics Canada

== Government ==
- Mayor: Gilbert Marquis
- Councillors: Johanne Gagné, Guy Gendron, Gaétan Landry, Marie-Pier Leblanc, Hugues Ouellet, Cathy Perreault

List of former mayors:

- Louis Félix Chouinard (1906–1911)
- J. M. Durette (1912)
- Jean Morin (1912–1919)
- Aurèle Larrivée (1919)
- Alphonse St-Laurent (1919–1921, 1935)
- J. Wilfrid Bégin (1921–1924, 1939–1941)
- Joseph Lévesque (1925–1932)
- J. Fabien Coulombe (1932–1933)
- Pierre Dubé (1933–1935)
- J. Henri D'Assylva (1935–1939, 1953–1957)
- Émile Sirois (1939)
- Arthur Dufour (1941–1949, 1964–1966)
- Napoléon Landry (1949–1953)
- Joachim Turcotte (1957–1964)
- Alfred Landry (1966–1983)
- Denis D'Astous (1983–1987)
- Jean Louis Bérubé (1987–1989)
- Bernard Landry (1989–1994)
- Marius Thibault (1994–2001)
- Gilbert Sénéchal (2001–2017)
- Daniel Carrier (2017–2021)
- Gilbert Marquis (2021–present)

== See also ==
- List of village municipalities in Quebec
