= René Canuel =

Canadian politician

René Canuel (born 21 October 1936 in Sainte-Odile, Quebec) was a member of the House of Commons of Canada from 1993 to 2000. He is a professor and teacher by career.

Canuel was elected in the Matapédia-Matane electoral district under the Bloc Québécois party in the 1993 and 1997 federal elections, thus serving in the 35th and 36th Canadian Parliaments. Canuel left Canadian politics in 2000 as he did not seek a third term in that year's federal election.

== Electoral record ==
1993 Canadian federal election: Haute-Gaspésie—La Mitis—Matane—Matapédia
| Party | Candidate | Votes | % | ±% | Expenditures |
|---|---|---|---|---|---|
| Bloc Québécois | René Canuel | 18,331 | 57.33 | | $23,993 |
| Liberal | Maurice Gauthier | 10,410 | 32.55 | – | $44,410 |
| Progressive Conservative | Jean-Luc Joncas | 2,448 | 7.66 | | $34,058 |
| Natural Law | Pierre Gauthier | 570 | 1.78 | | $0 |
| New Democratic | Robert McKoy | 218 | 0.68 | | $0 |
| Total valid votes/expense limit | | 31,977 | 100.00 | – | $54,749 |
| Total rejected ballots | | 618 | | | |
| Turnout | | 32,595 | 71.76 | | |
| Electors on the lists | | 45,421 | | | |
Source: Thirty-fifth General Election, 1993: Official Voting Results, Published by the Chief Electoral Officer of Canada. Financial figures taken from official contributions and expenses provided by Elections Canada.
