= François Jean Pelletier =

Canadian politician

François-Jean Pelletier (November 17, 1863 – December 15, 1945) was a merchant and political figure in Quebec. He represented Matane in the House of Commons of Canada from 1917 to 1925 as a Liberal. Pelletier was elected to the Legislature of the State of Montana for Silver Bow County in 1899 and 1901.

He was born in Sainte-Anne-de-la-Pocatière, Canada East, the son of Henri Pelletier, and was educated at the Collège de Sainte-Anne-de-la-Pocatière. After completing his schooling, Pelletier worked as a clerk and assistant postmaster in Matane. In 1881, he was hired by the Canadian Pacific Railway as a station agent and telegraph operator. In 1884, Pelletier moved to Montana where he worked as a bookkeeper, as foreman at the Montana Meat Company and as an employee of the Armour Packing and Provision Company. In 1888, he married Mélanie Joncas. He later returned to Matane where he reestablished himself as a merchant. Pelletier died in Matane at the age of 82.

In the records for the state of Montana, his name is recorded as Frank J. Pelletier.
