= Philéas Côté =

Canadian politician

Member of Parliament for Matapédia—Matane
- In office June 1945 – June 1953

Personal details
- Born: Antoine-Philéas Côté; 19 August 1903 Métis, Quebec, Canada
- Died: 27 September 1954 (aged 51)
- Party: Liberal; Independent Liberal
- Spouse(s): Blanchette Marien m. 23 December 1933
- Profession: author, journalist

Antoine-Philéas Côté (19 August 1903 – 27 September 1954) was a Liberal party and Independent Liberal member of the House of Commons of Canada. He was born in Métis, Quebec and became an author and journalist by career. He is known for his early attempts to officially establish "O Canada" as the national anthem and to rename the national holiday to Canada Day.

== Education and early career ==
Côté attended Quebec Seminary then Université Laval where he received his Bachelor of Laws degree. He attended Harvard University for further post-graduate studies. His journalistic work appeared in Le Soleil, La Patrie and Le Canada. He also served as the French-language director of the Liberal Party Association, and served on the National Film Board.

== Political career ==
He was first elected as an Independent Liberal member of Parliament at the Matapédia—Matane riding in the 1945 general election. He and a number of other Quebec Liberals had broken with their party the year before during the Conscription Crisis of 1944, quitting the party in order to oppose the government's decision to deploy National Resources Mobilization Act conscripts overseas. Previously, conscripts had only been used for "home defence" and kept within Canada. During his first term in office he joined the Liberal Party and became a member of the party's caucus and was re-elected in the 1949 election as an official Liberal candidate.

In 1946, Côté introduced a private member's bill to rename the Dominion Day holiday to Canada Day. His bill was passed quickly by the House of Commons but was stalled by the Senate which returned the bill to the Commons recommending that the holiday be renamed "The National Holiday of Canada". The Senate amendment effectively killed Côté's Canada Day bill. The national holiday was not renamed Canada Day until 1982.

Côté moved in Parliament that Canada be officially named "The Kingdom of Canada" arguing that this would clarify the nationhood status of Canada and its association with Britain, especially for immigrants. This resolution was defeated by the House of Commons on 22 April 1952. He also sought to designate the song "O Canada" as the official national anthem, a status which was not granted until 1980.

== Death ==
Côté died unexpectedly on 27 September 1954 of a heart attack.
