= Haute-Gaspésie—La Mitis—Matane—Matapédia =

Former federal electoral district in Quebec, Canada

Coordinates: 48.797°N 66.998°W

Quebec electoral district
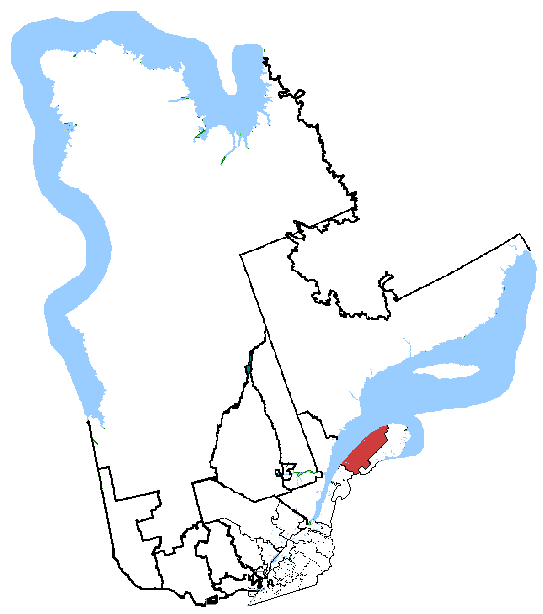
- Haute-Gaspésie—La Mitis—Matane—Matapédia in relation to other Quebec federal electoral districts

Defunct federal electoral district
- Legislature: House of Commons
- District created: 1993
- District abolished: 2013
- First contested: 1935
- Last contested: 2011
- District webpage: profile, map

Demographics
- Population (2011): 71,389
- Electors (2011): 59,340
- Area (km²): 16,038.24
- Census division(s): La Haute-Gaspésie RCM, Matane RCM, La Matapédia RCM, La Mitis RCM
- Census subdivision(s): Amqui, Cap-Chat, Causapscal, Matane, Mont-Joli, Sayabec, Sainte-Madeleine-de-la-Rivière-Madeleine, Saint-Maxime-du-Mont-Louis, Mont-Saint-Pierre, Rivière-à-Claude, Marsoui, La Martre, Sainte-Anne-des-Monts, Coulée-des-Adolphe, Mont-Albert, Albertville, Lac-au-Saumon, Sainte-Florence, Sainte-Marguerite, Saint-Vianney, Val-Brillant, Saint-Noël, Saint-Alexandre-des-Lacs, Saint-Cléophas, Saint-Damase, Sainte-Irène, Saint-Léon-le-Grand, Saint-Moïse, Saint-Tharcisius, Saint-Zénon-du-Lac-Humqui, Lac-Alfred, Lac-Casault, Lac-Matapédia, Rivière-Patapédia-Est, Rivière-Vaseuse, Routhierville, Ruisseau-des-Mineurs, Baie-des-Sables, Grosses-Roches, Les Méchins, Sainte-Félicité, Sainte-Paule, Saint-René-de-Matane, Saint-Ulric, Saint-Adelme, Saint-Jean-de-Cherbourg, Saint-Léandre, Rivière-Bonjour, Métis-sur-Mer, Grand-Métis, Les Hauteurs, Padoue, Sainte-Angèle-de-Mérici, Sainte-Luce, Saint-Gabriel-de-Rimouski, Price, La Rédemption, Saint-Charles-Garnier, Saint-Donat, Sainte-Flavie, Sainte-Jeanne-d'Arc, Saint-Joseph-de-Lepage, Saint-Octave-de-Métis, Lac-à-la-Croix, Lac-des-Eaux-Mortes

Haute-Gaspésie—La Mitis—Matane—Matapédia (formerly known as Matapédia—Matane) was a federal electoral district in Quebec, Canada, that was represented in the House of Commons of Canada from 1979 until 2013. It has the lowest percentage of visible minorities among all Canadian electoral districts (0.3%).

== Geography ==
The district consists of the Regional County Municipalities of La Haute-Gaspésie, La Matapédia, Matane and La Mitis.

The neighbouring ridings are Rimouski-Neigette—Témiscouata—Les Basques, Montmorency—Charlevoix—Haute-Côte-Nord, Manicouagan, Gaspésie—Îles-de-la-Madeleine, and Madawaska—Restigouche.

== History ==
The riding was created in 1933 as "Matapédia—Matane" from parts of Matane riding. It was abolished in 1966 when it was redistributed into Matane and Rimouski ridings.

It was created in 1976 as "Matapédia—Matane" from parts of Matane and Rimouski ridings. The name of the riding was changed in 2004 to "Haute-Gaspésie—La Mitis—Matane—Matapédia".

As per the 2012 federal electoral redistribution, this riding was dissolved and most became part of Avignon—La Mitis—Matane—Matapédia, while the remainder joined Gaspésie—Les Îles-de-la-Madeleine.

=== Members of Parliament ===
This riding has elected the following members of Parliament:

Parliament	Years	Member	Party
Matapédia—Matane; Riding created from Matane
18th	1935–1940	Arthur-Joseph Lapointe	Liberal
19th	1940–1945	Arthur-Joseph Lapointe	Liberal
20th	1945–1949	Philéas Côté	Independent Liberal
21st	1949–1953	Philéas Côté	Liberal
22nd	1953–1957	Léandre Thibault	Liberal
23rd	1957–1958	Léandre Thibault	Liberal
24th	1958–1962	Alfred Belzile	Progressive Conservative
25th	1962–1963	Alfred Belzile	Progressive Conservative
26th	1963–1965	René Tremblay	Liberal
27th	1965–1968	René Tremblay	Liberal
Riding dissolved into Matane and Rimouski
Riding re-created from Matane and Rimouski
31st	1979–1980	Pierre de Bané	Liberal
32nd	1980–1984	Pierre de Bané	Liberal
33rd	1984–1988	Jean-Luc Joncas	Progressive Conservative
34th	1988–1993	Jean-Luc Joncas	Progressive Conservative
35th	1993–1997	René Canuel	Bloc Québécois
36th	1997–2000	René Canuel	Bloc Québécois
37th	2000–2004	Jean-Yves Roy	Bloc Québécois
Haute-Gaspésie—La Mitis—Matane—Matapédia
38th	2004–2006	Jean-Yves Roy	Bloc Québécois
39th	2006–2008	Jean-Yves Roy	Bloc Québécois
40th	2008–2010	Jean-Yves Roy	Bloc Québécois
41st	2011–2014	Jean-François Fortin	Bloc Québécois
41st	2014–2014	Jean-François Fortin	Independent
41st	2014–2015	Jean-François Fortin	Strength in Democracy
Riding dissolved into Avignon—La Mitis—Matane—Matapédia and Gaspésie—Les Îles-de-la-Madeleine

== Election results ==
=== Haute-Gaspésie—La Mitis—Matane—Matapédia, 2003 representation order ===
2011 Canadian federal election
Party	Candidate	Votes	%	±%	Expenditures
Bloc Québécois	Jean-François Fortin	12,633	36.05	-1.48	$83,313.68
Liberal	Nancy Charest	8,964	25.58	-10.02	$57,826.03
New Democratic	Joanie Boulet	7,484	21.36	+16.67	$24.16
Conservative	Allen Cormier	5,253	14.99	-3.08	$52,135.20
Green	Louis Drainville	707	2.02	-1.55	$3,418.82
Total valid votes/expense limit		35,041	100.0		$86,709.81
Total rejected, unmarked and declined ballots		393	1.11	+0.07	
Turnout		35,434	59.81	+5.43	
Eligible voters		59,397			
Bloc Québécois hold		Swing		+4.27	

2008 Canadian federal election
Party	Candidate	Votes	%	±%	Expenditures
Bloc Québécois	Jean-Yves Roy	11,984	37.53	-8.51	$27,685.06
Liberal	Nancy Charest	11,368	35.60	+22.53	$33,059.08
Conservative	Jérôme Landry	5,771	18.07	-11.68	$36,135.20
New Democratic	Julie Demers	1,497	4.69	-1.51	none listed
Green	Louis Drainville	1,139	3.57	+0.90	$5,771.18
Independent	Liliane Potvin	175	0.55	–	$995.72
Total valid votes/expense limit		31,934	100.0		$83,890
Total rejected, unmarked and declined ballots		334	1.04	-0.07	
Turnout		32,268	54.38	-3.74	
Eligible voters		59,340			
Bloc Québécois hold		Swing		-15.52	

2006 Canadian federal election
Party	Candidate	Votes	%	±%	Expenditures
Bloc Québécois	Jean-Yves Roy	15,721	46.04	-10.41	$37,418.83
Conservative	Rodrigue Drapeau	10,157	29.75	+23.52	$9,382.28
Liberal	Kim Leclerc	4,463	13.07	-17.41	$16,825.39
New Democratic	Stéphane Ricard	2,116	6.20	+1.21	$6,369.99
Green	Sarah Desjardins	910	2.67	+0.82	none listed
Independent	Yvan Côté	778	2.28	–	$145.46
Total valid votes/expense limit		34,145	100.0		$78,148
Total rejected, unmarked and declined ballots		384	1.11	-0.56	
Turnout		34,529	58.12	+3.92	
Eligible voters		59,403			
Bloc Québécois hold		Swing		-16.96	

=== Matapédia—Matane, 2003 representation order ===
2004 Canadian federal election
Party	Candidate	Votes	%	±%	Expenditures
Bloc Québécois	Jean-Yves Roy	17,878	56.45	+5.64	$33,104.30
Liberal	Marc Bélanger	9,653	30.48	-10.00	$43,493.59
Conservative	Vahid Fortin-Vidah	1,972	6.23	+0.96	$7,100.94
New Democratic	Jean-Guy Côté	1,581	4.99	+2.53	$1,189.95
Green	Nicolas Deville	585	1.85	–	none listed
Total valid votes/expense limit		31,669	100.0		$76,262
Total rejected, unmarked and declined ballots		536	1.67		
Turnout		32,205	54.20	-1.77	
Eligible voters		59,416			
Bloc Québécois notional hold		Swing		+7.82	
Changes from 2000 are based on redistributed results. Change for the Conservative Party is based on the combined totals of the Progressive Conservative Party and the Canadian Alliance.

2000 federal election redistributed results
Party	Vote	%
Bloc Québécois	16,584	50.81
Liberal	13,213	40.48
Progressive Conservative	1,326	4.06
New Democratic	804	2.46
Alliance	397	1.21
Others	314	0.96

=== Matapédia—Matane, 1979–2000 ===
2000 Canadian federal election
Party	Candidate	Votes	%	±%
Bloc Québécois	Jean-Yves Roy	14,678	46.6	+1.8
Liberal	Marc Bélanger	14,402	45.8	+15.6
Progressive Conservative	Germain Dumas	1,456	4.6	-18.2
New Democratic	Karine Paquet-Gauthier	935	3.0	+1.8
Total valid votes		31,471	100.0	

1997 Canadian federal election
Party	Candidate	Votes	%	±%
Bloc Québécois	René Canuel	15,694	44.8	-12.6
Liberal	Robert Boulay	10,558	30.1	-2.3
Progressive Conservative	Darryl Gray	7,991	22.8	+15.1
New Democratic	Anny-Jos Paquin	417	1.2	+0.5
Natural Law	Miville Couture	377	1.1	-0.7
Total valid votes		35,037	100.0	

1993 Canadian federal election
Party	Candidate	Votes	%	±%
Bloc Québécois	René Canuel	18,331	57.4	
Liberal	Maurice Gauthier	10,345	32.4	-4.0
Progressive Conservative	Jean-Luc Joncas	2,446	7.7	-42.5
Natural Law	Pierre Gauthier	573	1.8	
New Democratic	Robert McKoy	219	0.7	-12.7
Total valid votes		31,914	100.0	

1988 Canadian federal election
Party	Candidate	Votes	%	±%
Progressive Conservative	Jean-Luc Joncas	15,962	50.2	-2.5
Liberal	Claude Canuel	11,584	36.4	+3.7
New Democratic	Yves Coté	4,253	13.4	+10.4
Total valid votes		31,799	100.0	

1984 Canadian federal election
Party	Candidate	Votes	%	±%
Progressive Conservative	Jean-Luc Joncas	15,994	52.7	+41.3
Liberal	Jocelyne Lévesque	9,929	32.7	-45.1
Parti nationaliste	Pierre Dufort	3,523	11.6	
New Democratic	Frédéric D'Astous	909	3.0	-0.3
Total valid votes		30,355	100.0	

1980 Canadian federal election
Party	Candidate	Votes	%	±%
Liberal	Pierre De Bané	21,116	77.8	+5.4
Progressive Conservative	Roland Paquin	3,095	11.4	+0.4
Social Credit	Léonard Boulay	1,137	4.2	-9.0
Rhinoceros	Michel Bélair	892	3.3	
New Democratic	Thérèse Beaulieu	888	3.3	+1.3
Total valid votes		27,128	100.0	

1979 Canadian federal election
Party	Candidate	Votes	%
Liberal	Pierre De Bané	19,728	72.4
Social Credit	Roland Paquin	3,602	13.2
Progressive Conservative	Joseph-Marie Lévesque	2,993	11.0
New Democratic	André Noël	548	2.0
Union populaire	Pierre Demers	374	1.4
Total valid votes		27,245	100.0

=== Matapédia—Matane, 1933 - 1968 ===
1965 Canadian federal election
Party	Candidate	Votes	%	±%
Liberal	René Tremblay	10,435	51.8	+8.8
Progressive Conservative	Roland-L. English	5,568	27.6	+2.4
Ralliement créditiste	J.-Gérard Pelletier	3,383	16.8	-14.5
New Democratic	H.-Aubin Dussault	769	3.8	
Total valid votes		20,155	100.0	

Note: Ralliement créditiste vote is compared to Social Credit vote in the 1963 election.

1963 Canadian federal election
Party	Candidate	Votes	%	±%
Liberal	René Tremblay	10,265	43.0	+6.2
Social Credit	Eudore Allard	7,237	30.3	-1.4
Progressive Conservative	J.-Alfred Belzile	6,021	25.2	-11.6
Independent Social Credit	Gérard Ratté	344	1.4	
Total valid votes		23,867	100.0	

1962 Canadian federal election
Party	Candidate	Votes	%	±%
Progressive Conservative	J.-Alfred Belzile	8,484	36.8	-22.1
Social Credit	Eudore Allard	7,299	31.7	
Liberal	Wilfrid Lafontaine	6,304	27.4	-13.7
Independent Liberal	Amable Ouellet	633	2.7	
New Democratic	H.-Aubin Dussault	328	1.4	
Total valid votes		23,048	100.0	

1958 Canadian federal election
Party	Candidate	Votes	%	±%
Progressive Conservative	J.-Alfred Belzile	14,969	58.9	+10.6
Liberal	Roland Bergeron	10,433	41.1	-10.6
Total valid votes		25,402	100.0	

1957 Canadian federal election
Party	Candidate	Votes	%	±%
Liberal	Léandre Thibault	11,642	51.7	-2.4
Progressive Conservative	Alfred Belzile	10,889	48.3	-2.4
Total valid votes		22,531	100.0	

1953 Canadian federal election
Party	Candidate	Votes	%	±%
Liberal	Léandre Thibault	12,689	54.1	+4.1
Progressive Conservative	J.-Donat Brulé	10,765	45.9	+3.2
Total valid votes		23,454	100.0	

1949 Canadian federal election
Party	Candidate	Votes	%	±%
Liberal	A.-Philéas Coté	11,546	50.3	+2.8
Progressive Conservative	Adélard Fortin	9,811	42.7	
Union des électeurs	Jean-Charles Gosselin	678	3.0	
Independent Liberal	Louis-Philippe Rioux	558	2.4	-6.8
Independent Liberal	David Ratté	368	1.6	
Total valid votes		22,961	100.0	

1945 Canadian federal election
Party	Candidate	Votes	%	±%
Independent Liberal	A.-Philéas Coté	8,500	47.5	
Independent	Oscar Drouin	7,208	40.3	
Bloc populaire	Louis-Philippe Rioux	1,648	9.2	
Independent	Arthur Lepage	546	3.0	
Total valid votes		17,902	100.0	

1940 Canadian federal election
Party	Candidate	Votes	%	±%
Liberal	Arthur-Joseph Lapointe	9,956	63.2	+28.3
National Government	Joseph-Ernest-Henri Larue	5,804	36.8	+3.0
Total valid votes		15,760	100.0	

Note: "National Government" vote is compared to Conservative vote in 1935 election.

1935 Canadian federal election
Party	Candidate	Votes	%
Liberal	Arthur-Joseph Lapoine	4,987	34.9
Conservative	Joseph-Ernest-Henri Larue	4,834	33.8
Reconstruction	Georges-Léonidas Dionne	4,476	31.3
Total valid votes		14,297	100.0

== See also ==
- List of Canadian electoral districts
- Historical federal electoral districts of Canada
