= Jean-François Fortin (politician) =

Canadian politician (born 1973)

His Worship Jean-François Fortin

Mayor of Sainte-Flavie
- Incumbent
- Assumed office 2017
- Preceded by: Rose-Marie Gallagher
- In office 2006–2009
- Preceded by: Léon Gaudreault
- Succeeded by: Damien Ruest

Leader of Strength in Democracy
- In office October 21, 2014 – January 3, 2016
- Preceded by: Party created
- Succeeded by: Party dissolved

Member of Parliament for Haute-Gaspésie—La Mitis—Matane—Matapédia
- In office May 30, 2011 – August 4, 2015
- Preceded by: Jean-Yves Roy
- Succeeded by: Riding dissolved

Leader of the Bloc Québécois in the House of Commons Interim
- In office February 26, 2014 – August 12, 2014
- Preceded by: André Bellavance
- Succeeded by: Louis Plamondon

Personal details
- Born: September 12, 1973 (age 52)
- Other political affiliations: Strength in Democracy (2014–2016); Independent (2014); Bloc Québécois (2011–2014)
- Profession: Professor

Jean-François Fortin (born September 12, 1973) is a Canadian politician. He was elected to represent the riding of Haute-Gaspésie—La Mitis—Matane—Matapédia in the 2011 federal election as a member of the Bloc Québécois, and was chosen interim parliamentary leader of the Bloc on February 26, 2014.

On August 12, 2014, Fortin quit the party to sit as an independent, saying that the Bloc Québécois he had joined no longer exists and that new party leader Mario Beaulieu had destroyed its credibility.

On October 21, 2014, Fortin, along with Jean-François Larose, the NDP MP for Repentigny, announced that they were forming Strength in Democracy, a new Quebec-centred political party dedicated to representing the province's regions. In the 2015 federal election he ran for the new riding of Avignon—La Mitis—Matane—Matapédia and lost to Liberal Rémi Massé.

== Early life ==
Prior to being elected to parliament, Fortin was a professor of political science at Cégep de Rimouski from 2001 until 2011. He was also elected as a city councillor in Sainte-Flavie in 2003 and served a term as mayor from 2006 until 2009.

== Political career ==
Fortin was one of only four Bloc Québécois MPs elected in the 2011 federal election which saw the party's caucus reduced from 47 to 4 and was the only non-incumbent Bloc candidate to win election. He won the seat of Haute-Gaspésie—La Mitis—Matane—Matapédia, which had been vacated by fellow Bloc Québécois politician Jean-Yves Roy who resigned from Parliament in late 2010 because of ill health.

On September 17, 2011, Fortin declared his candidacy in the Bloc Québécois leadership election that was held to choose a successor to Gilles Duceppe. He was defeated on the first ballot on December 11, 2011.

Fortin considered running in the 2014 party leadership election but decided to back André Bellavance. On August 12, 2014, almost two months after Mario Beaulieu's upset victory, Fortin quit the Bloc Quebecois to sit as an Independent accusing Beaulieu of "pushing a unidimensional, intransigent agenda that lacks rigour has put an end to the credibility established by (former leaders) Gilles Duceppe and followed up by Daniel Paillé, two leaders who merit great respect." He continued, saying that "Beaulieu is dividing sovereignists instead of uniting them." In October, Fortin and another MP announced the formation of the Strength in Democracy party, which sat in the Canadian legislature with Fortin as leader.

In the 2015 federal election Fortin ran for the redistributed riding of Avignon—La Mitis—Matane—Matapédia under the Strength In Democracy banner. He lost to Liberal Rémi Massé, coming in fourth.

== Election results ==
2015 Canadian federal election: Avignon—La Mitis—Matane—Matapédia
Party	Candidate	Votes	%	±%	Expenditures
Liberal	Rémi Massé	14,378	39.55	+16.34	–
Bloc Québécois	Kédina Fleury-Samson	7,641	21.02	-13.47	–
New Democratic	Joël Charest	7,340	20.19	-6.44	–
Strength in Democracy	Jean-François Fortin	4,229	11.63	–	–
Conservative	André Savoie	2,228	6.13	-7.03	–
Green	Sherri Springle	365	1.0	-1.51	–
Rhinoceros	Éric Normand	175	0.48	–	–
Total valid votes/Expense limit		36,356	100.0		$209,302.73
Total rejected ballots		416	–	–	
Turnout		36,772	–	–	
Eligible voters		60,801			
Source: Elections Canada

2011 Canadian federal election: Haute-Gaspésie—La Mitis—Matane—Matapédia
Party	Candidate	Votes	%	±%	Expenditures
Bloc Québécois	Jean-François Fortin	12,633	36.05	-1.48	$83,313.68
Liberal	Nancy Charest	8,964	25.58	-10.02	$57,826.03
New Democratic	Joanie Boulet	7,484	21.36	+16.67	$24.16
Conservative	Allen Cormier	5,253	14.99	-3.08	$52,135.20
Green	Louis Drainville	707	2.02	-1.55	$3,418.82
Total valid votes/Expense limit		35,041	100.0		$86,709.81
Total rejected, unmarked and declined ballots		393	1.11	+0.07	
Turnout		35,434	59.81	+5.43	
Eligible voters		59,397			
Bloc Québécois hold		Swing		+4.27	
