= Saint-Moïse =

- Parish municipality
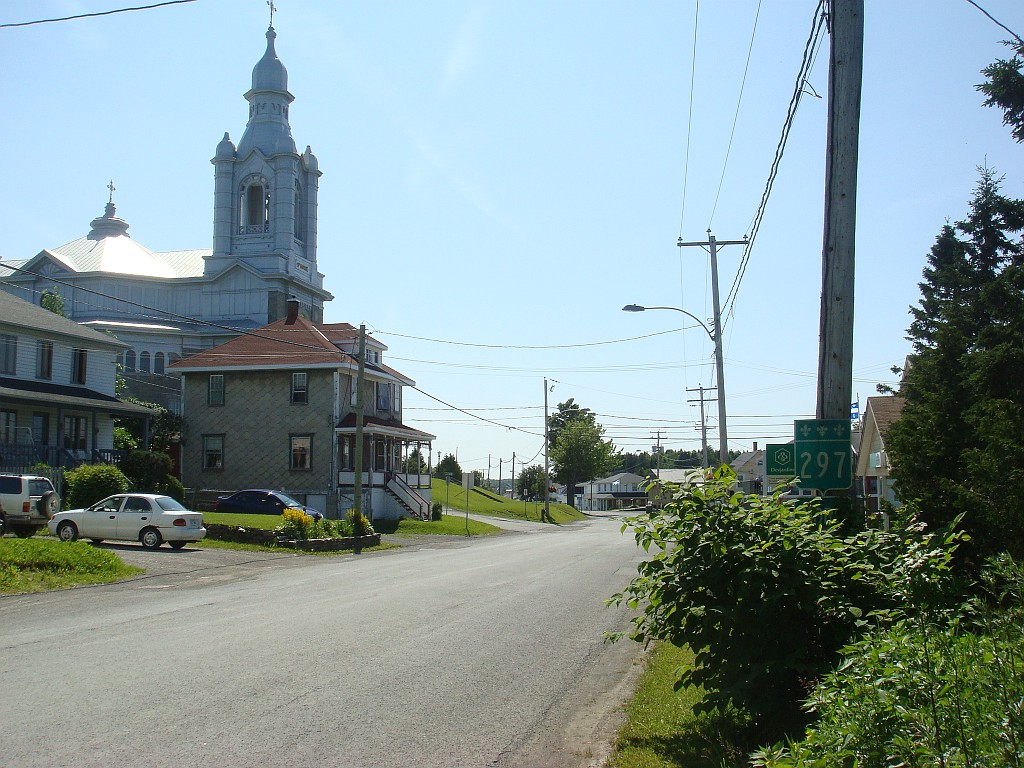

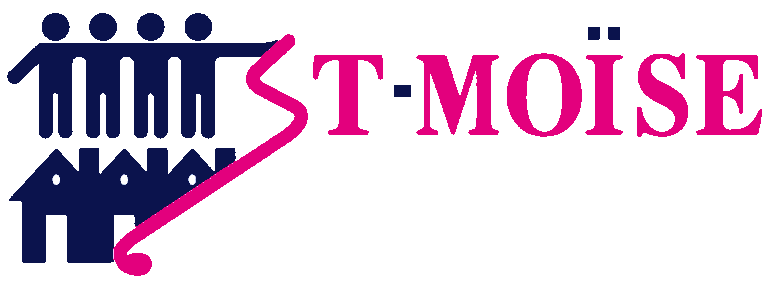
- Seal

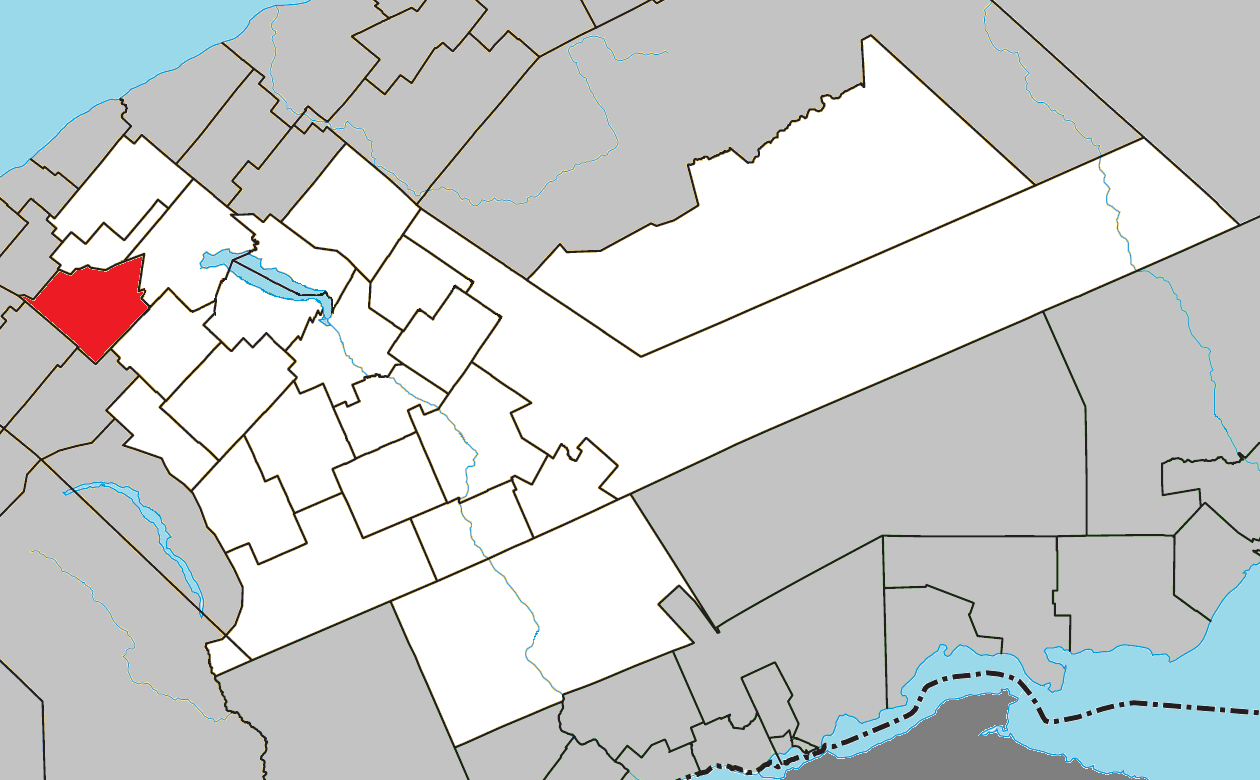
- Location within La Matapédia RCM

- Location in eastern Quebec
- Coordinates: 48°31′N 67°51′W
- Country: Canada
- Province: Quebec
- Region: Bas-Saint-Laurent
- RCM: La Matapédia
- Settled: c. 1870
- Constituted: January 1, 1878

Government
  - Mayor: Patrick Fillion
  - Fed. riding: Rimouski-Neigette—Mitis—Matapédia—Les Basques
  - Prov. riding: Matane-Matapédia-Mitis

Area
  - Total: 111.96 km^{2} (43.23 sq mi)
  - Land: 109.80 km^{2} (42.39 sq mi)

Population (2021)
  - Total: 542
  - Density: 4.9/km^{2} (13/sq mi)
  - Change 2016-21: ▼6.6%
  - Dwellings: 324
- Time zone: UTC−5 (EST)
  - Summer (DST): UTC−4 (EDT)
- Postal code(s): G0J 2Z0
- Area codes: 418, 581
- Highways: R-132 R-297
- Website: st-moise.com

Saint-Moïse (French pronunciation: [sɛ̃ mɔiz]) is a parish municipality in Quebec, Canada. It is located at the intersection of routes 132 and 297.

== Demographics ==
In the 2021 Census of Population conducted by Statistics Canada, Saint-Moïse had a population of 542 living in 265 of its 324 total private dwellings, a change of −6.6% from its 2016 population of 580. With a land area of 109.8 km^{2} (42.4 sq mi), it had a population density of 4.9/km^{2} (12.8/sq mi) in 2021.

Canada census – Saint-Moïse community profile

	2021	2016	2011
Population	542 (-6.6% from 2016)	580 (0,5% from 2011)	577 (-7.7% from 2006)
Land area	109.80 km^{2} (42.39 sq mi)	109.93 km^{2} (42.44 sq mi)	110.67 km^{2} (42.73 sq mi)
Population density	4.9/km^{2} (13/sq mi)	5.3/km^{2} (14/sq mi)	5.2/km^{2} (13/sq mi)
Median age	53.2 (M: 53.6, F: 52.8)	51.3 (M: 51.9, F: 50.5)	48.2 (M: 49.5, F: 46.9)
Private dwellings	324 (total) 265 (occupied)	292 (total)	313 (total)
Median household income	$52,400	$39,424	$31,557

References: 2021 2016 2011

Historical census populations – Saint-Moïse

Year	Pop.	±%
1881	465	—
1891	537	+15.5%
1901	908	+69.1%
1911	731	−19.5%
1921	1,090	+49.1%
1931	867	−20.5%
1941	1,067	+23.1%
1951	1,371	+28.5%

Year	Pop.	±%
1956	1,435	+4.7%
1961	1,406	−2.0%
1966	1,049	−25.4%
1971	972	−7.3%
1976	750	−22.8%
1981	689	−8.1%
1986	711	+3.2%
1991	667	−6.2%

Year	Pop.	±%
1996	625	−6.3%
2001	633	+1.3%
2006	625	−1.3%
2011	577	−7.7%
2016	580	+0.5%
2021	542	−6.6%

Source: Statistics Canada

== Notable residents ==
- Joseph Kaeble - Saint-Moïse born recipient of the Victoria Cross for actions in France during the First World War

== See also ==
- List of parish municipalities in Quebec
