= Baie-des-Sables =

- Municipality
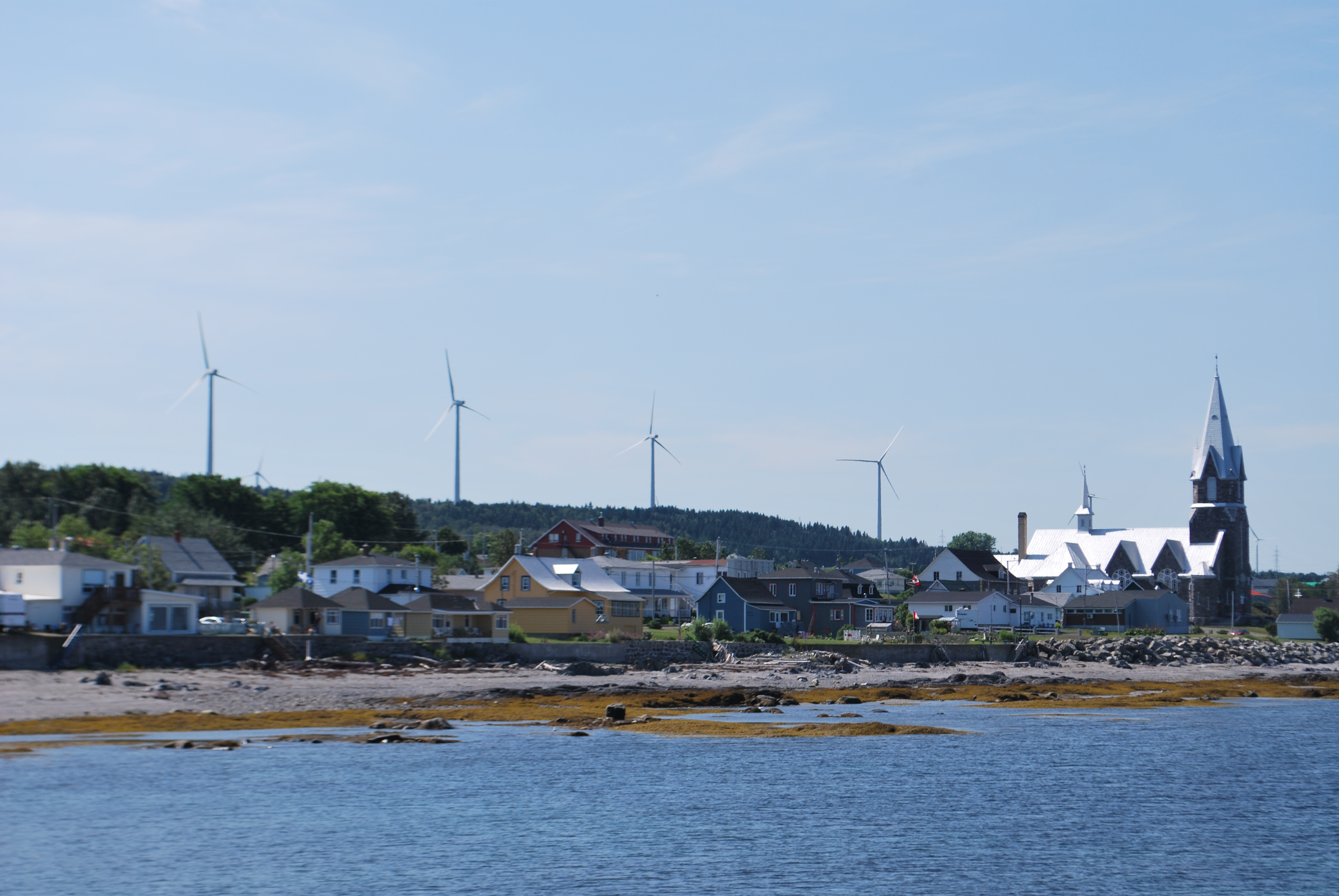

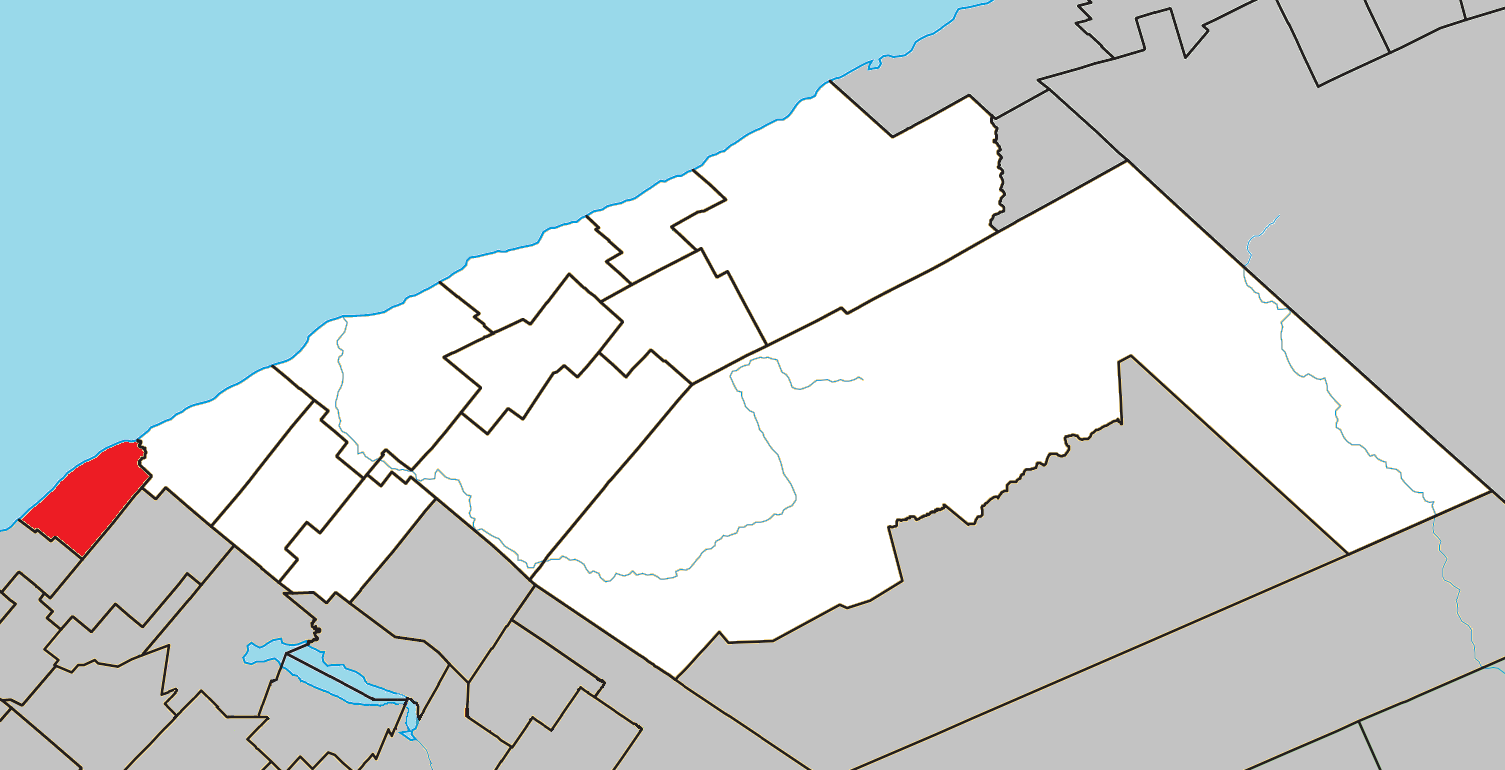
- Location within La Matanie RCM

- Location in eastern Quebec
- Coordinates: 48°43′N 67°51′W
- Country: Canada
- Province: Quebec
- Region: Bas-Saint-Laurent
- RCM: La Matanie
- Constituted: January 1, 1859

Government
  - Mayor: Gérald Beaulieu
  - Fed. riding: Gaspésie—Les Îles-de-la-Madeleine—Listuguj
  - Prov. riding: Matane-Matapédia-Mitis

Area
  - Total: 65.37 km^{2} (25.24 sq mi)
  - Land: 65.07 km^{2} (25.12 sq mi)

Population (2021)
  - Total: 613
  - Density: 9.4/km^{2} (24/sq mi)
  - Change (2016-21): ▼2.4%
  - Dwellings: 336
- Time zone: UTC−5 (EST)
  - Summer (DST): UTC−4 (EDT)
- Postal code(s): G0J 1C0
- Area codes: 418, 581
- Highways: R-132 R-297
- Website: baiedessables.ca

Baie-des-Sables (French pronunciation: [bɛ de sabl]) is a municipality in La Matanie Regional County Municipality in the Bas-Saint-Laurent region of Quebec, Canada.

Its elevation is 176 metres (577 ft).

== History ==
The area was originally part of the Mitis seignory, purchased by Mathew MacNider in 1802, and acquired by his brother John MacNider in 1807. MacNider encouraged settlement of Scottish families there. Upon John Macnider's death in 1829, the seignory was inherited by the 2 sons of Adam Lymburner Macnider, nephew of John. In 1842, the geographic township of MacNider was created.

In 1853, the Mission of L'Assomption-de-Notre-Dame was established, and in 1859, the Township Municipality of MacNider was formed when it ceded from the Municipality of Métis. In 1864, the MacNider Post Office opened.

The Scottish settlers began to call the place Sandy Bay, or also Sandy Beach, in reference to a prominent sandbank on the western edge of the municipality. In 1902, the post office was renamed to Sandy Bay, and renamed to the French equivalent, Baie-des-Sables, in 1925. In 1932, the township municipality followed suit and changed name and statutes from Township Municipality of MacNider to the Municipality of Baie-des-Sables.

== Demographics ==
Canada census – Baie-des-Sables community profile

	2021	2016	2011
Population	613 (-2.4% from 2016)	628 (3.1% from 2011)	609 (-0.8% from 2006)
Land area	65.07 km^{2} (25.12 sq mi)	65.19 km^{2} (25.17 sq mi)	65.48 km^{2} (25.28 sq mi)
Population density	9.4/km^{2} (24/sq mi)	9.6/km^{2} (25/sq mi)	9.3/km^{2} (24/sq mi)
Median age	56.0 (M: 56.4, F: 56.0)	51.9 (M: 51.7, F: 52.5)	48.5 (M: 47.5, F: 48.96)
Private dwellings	336 (total) 281 (occupied)	328 (total)	277 (total)
Median household income	$58,000	$51,840	$48,415

References: 2021 2016 2011

Historical census populations – Baie-des-Sables

Year	Pop.	±%
1861	1,235	—
1871	2,265	+83.4%
1881	2,364	+4.4%
1891	1,881	−20.4%
1901	1,908	+1.4%
1911	1,769	−7.3%
1921	1,703	−3.7%
1931	1,965	+15.4%

Year	Pop.	±%
1941	2,001	+1.8%
1951	1,793	−10.4%
1956	1,279	−28.7%
1961	1,394	+9.0%
1966	1,207	−13.4%
1971	1,068	−11.5%
1976	910	−14.8%
1981	895	−1.6%

Year	Pop.	±%
1986	763	−14.7%
1991	698	−8.5%
1996	657	−5.9%
2001	654	−0.5%
2006	614	−6.1%
2011	609	−0.8%
2016	628	+3.1%
2021	613	−2.4%

Population counts are not adjusted for boundary changes.
Source: Statistics Canada

=== Language ===
Mother tongue language (2021)

Language	Population	Pct (%)
French only	605	98.4%
English only	0	0.0%
Both English and French	5	0.8%
Other languages	0	0.0%

== Government ==
=== Local government ===
List of former mayors:

- Olivier Côté (1859–1862)
- Alexis Caron (1862–1864)
- Auguste Lamontagne (1864–1867)
- Georges Bélanger (1867–1868, 1889–1892)
- Louis Saucier (1868–1883)
- Achille Chouinard (1883–1886)
- Louis Martial Raymond (1886–1889)
- François Parent (1892–1893)
- Jean-Baptiste Pinault (1893–1894)
- Théophile Fournier (1894–1898)
- Georges Boucher (1898–1904)
- François St-Laurent (1904–1905)
- Thomas Santerre (1905–1910)
- Israël Michaud (1910–1919, 1923–1931, 1933–1935)
- Michel Crispo (1919–1920)
- Joseph Thibault (1920–1923)
- Octave Massé (1931–1933)
- J. Honoré Desrosiers (1935–1936)
- J. Antoine Santerre (1936–1951)
- Donald Mac Donald (1951–1955)
- Philippe Morin (1955–1963)
- Roland Massé (1963–...)
- Jacques Couillard (...–2009)
- Denis Santerre
- Gérald Beaulieu (2021–present)

== See also ==
- List of municipalities in Quebec
