= Canadian federal election results in Laval =

Seats obtained by party

Liberal
New Democratic
Bloc Québécois
Progressive Conservative (defunct)

Canadian federal elections have provided the following results in Laval since the 1968 election.

== Regional profile ==
In the 1970s and 1980s Laval replicated the province-wide results, with Liberal sweeps in 1979 and 1980 and a Progressive Conservative upsurge in 1984 and 1988. The Liberals were able to retain the Laval-des-Rapides seat in 1984 thanks to star candidate Raymond Garneau although at the time the riding had half of its territory on the island of Montreal in the Ahuntsic-Cartierville neighborhood. Having to choose another riding due to the 1987 Redistributions, Raymond Garneau choose to run again in the Ahunstic riding in 1988 and was defeated by the PC.

Throughout the 1990s and 2000s, the City of Laval has been a battleground between the Liberals and the Bloc Québécois. The NDP experienced an "orange wave" that swept through Quebec in 2011, with that party taking all of Laval. In 2015, however, the Liberals swept Laval, undoubtedly buoyed by Justin Trudeau representing a riding in this region. They maintained their sweep in 2019 and 2021.

The region is largely unaffected by the 2022 Redistribution with only a part of Vimy in the Pont-Viau neighborhood transferred to Alfred-Pellan.

=== Votes by party throughout time ===
Election	Liberal	Conservative	New Democratic	Bloc Québécois	Green	PC	Alliance	Others
1968	43,441; 57.6%	—	22,032; 29.2%	—	—	5,869; 7.8%	—	4,087; 5.4%
1972	51,171; 54.4%	—	11,537; 12.3%	—	—	14,169; 15.1%	—	17,249; 18.3%
1974	55,389; 62.5%	—	7,533; 8.5%	—	—	16,389; 18.5%	—	9,300; 10.5%
1979	111,724; 70.9%	—	10,062; 6.4%	—	—	14,669; 9.3%	—	21,145; 13.4%
1980	106,457; 74.8%	—	15,447; 10.9%	—	—	10,411; 7.3%	—	10,020; 7.0%
1984	64,256; 36.6%	—	18,386; 10.5%	—	—	80,993; 46.1%	—	12,098; 6.9%
1988	46,352; 28.7%	—	24,090; 14.9%	—	1,511; 0.9%	88,239; 54.6%	—	1,540; 1.0%
1993	63,672; 36.1%	—	1,964; 1.1%	89,061; 50.5%	—	19,804; 11.2%	—	1,897; 1.1%
1997	71,067; 38.3%	—	3,655; 2.0%	65,308; 35.2%	—	45,409; 24.5%	—	—
2000	81,480; 46.6%	—	2,169; 1.2%	68,447; 39.2%	2,928; 1.7%	8,850; 5.1%	9,422; 5.4%	1,505; 0.9%
2004	77,231; 37.9%	12,441; 6.1%	7,916; 3.9%	100,040; 49.1%	5,413; 2.7%	—	—	850; 0.4%
2006	56,849; 27.0%	39,599; 18.8%	16,015; 7.6%	90,400; 42.9%	7,798; 3.7%	—	—	211; 0.1%
2008	64,964; 30.5%	36,606; 17.2%	25,742; 12.1%	77,918; 36.5%	7,207; 3.4%	—	—	818; 0.4%
2011	39,635; 18.2%	26,878; 12.3%	99,958; 45.8%	46,563; 21.3%	4,232; 1.9%	—	—	1,032; 0.5%
2015	97,819; 44.8%	29,830; 13.7%	48,153; 22.1%	37,455; 17.2%	4,347; 2.0%	—	—	638; 0.3%
2019	103,401; 47.1%	26,107; 11.9%	18,432; 8.4%	60,193; 27.4%	8,500; 3.9%	—	—	2,987; 1.4%
2021	97,582; 47.6%	28,900; 14.1%	17,027; 8.3%	50,921; 24.9%	1,700; 0.8%	—	—	8,712; 4.3%
2025	117,672; 52.4%	55,156; 24.6%	8,543; 3.8%	42,625; 19.0%	—N/a	—N/a	—N/a	419; 0.2%

Vote share by party

Liberal
Conservative
New Democratic
Bloc Québécois
Green
Social Credit (defunct)
Alliance (defunct)
Progressive Conservative (defunct)

== Detailed results ==
=== 2021 ===
==== Seats won/lost by party ====
All seats were retained by the Liberal Party.

==== Party rankings ====
Parties	1st	2nd	3rd	4th	5th	6th
Liberal	4	0	0	0	0	0
Bloc Québécois	0	4	0	0	0	0
Conservative	0	0	4	0	0	0
New Democratic	0	0	0	4	0	0
People's	0	0	0	0	3	0
Free	0	0	0	0	1	1
Green	0	0	0	0	0	2

==== Results by riding ====
Electoral district	Candidates							Incumbent
Electoral district	Liberal	Conservative	BQ	NDP	Green	PPC	Other	Incumbent
Alfred-Pellan	Angelo Iacono; 24,516; 47.83%	Angiolino D'Anello; 6,988; 13.63%	Isabel Dion; 13,399; 26.14%	Cindy Mercer; 3,946; 7.70%	Pierre-Alexandre Corneillet; 940; 1.83%		Dwayne Cappelletti (Free); 1,467; 2.86%	Angelo Iacono
Laval—Les Îles	Fayçal El-Khoury; 24,758; 48.9%	Spyridonas Pettas; 8,963; 17.7%	Guillaume Jolivet; 9,656; 19.1%	Rowan Woodmass; 3,889; 7.7%	Ahmed Taleb; 760; 1.5%	Matthieu Couture; 2,571; 5.1%		Fayçal El-Khoury
Marc-Aurèle-Fortin	Yves Robillard; 22,992; 44.1%	Sarah Petrari; 6,120; 11.7%	Manon D. Lacharité; 16,055; 30.8%	Ali Faour; 4,461; 8.6%		Louis Léger; 1,509; 2.9%	Micheline Flibotte (Free); 990; 1.9%	Yves Robillard
Vimy	Annie Koutrakis; 25,316; 49.8%	Rima El-Helou; 6,829; 13.4%	Rachid Bandou; 11,811; 23.2%	Vassif Aliev; 4,731; 9.3%		Alejandro Morales-Loaiza; 2,175; 4.3%		Annie Koutrakis

=== 2019 ===
==== Seats won/lost by party ====
All seats were retained by the Liberal Party.

==== Party rankings ====
Parties	1st	2nd	3rd	4th	5th	6th
Liberal	4	0	0	0	0	0
Bloc Québécois	0	4	0	0	0	0
Conservative	0	0	4	0	0	0
New Democratic	0	0	0	4	0	0
Green	0	0	0	0	4	0
People's	0	0	0	0	0	4

==== Results by riding ====
Electoral district	Candidates							Incumbent
Electoral district	Liberal	Conservative	BQ	NDP	Green	PPC	Other	Incumbent
Alfred-Pellan	Angelo Iacono; 26,015; 47.90%	Angelo Esposito; 5,917; 10.90%	Michel Lachance; 15,549; 28.63%	Andriana Kocini; 4,109; 7.57%	Marguerite Howells; 1,958; 3.61%	Matthieu Couture; 471; 0.87%	Julius Buté (PIQ); 177; 0.33% Dwayne Cappelletti (Ind.); 113; 0.21%	Angelo Iacono
Laval—Les Îles	Fayçal El-Khoury; 26,031; 48.24%	Tom Pentefountas; 8,816; 16.34%	Nacera Beddad; 11,120; 20.61%	Noémia Onofre De Lima; 4,803; 8.90%	Sari Madi; 2,306; 4.27%	Marie-Louise Beauchamp; 885; 1.64%		Fayçal El-Khoury
Marc-Aurèle-Fortin	Yves Robillard; 24,865; 44.55%	Sonia Baudelot; 5,423; 9.72%	Lizabel Nitoi; 18,069; 32.37%	Ali Faour; 4,741; 8.49%	Bao Tran Le; 2,111; 3.78%	Emilio Migliozzi; 465; 0.83%	Elias Progakis (Ind.); 143; 0.26%	Yves Robillard
Vimy	Annie Koutrakis; 26,490; 47.70%	Rima El-Helou; 5,951; 10.72%	Claire-Emmanuelle Beaulieu; 15,455; 27.83%	Vassif Aliev; 4,779; 8.61%	Faiza R'Guiba; 2,125; 3.83%	Suzanne Brunelle; 733; 1.32%		Eva Nassif†

=== 2015 ===
==== Seats won/lost by party ====
Party	2011	Gain from (loss to)				2015
Party	2011	Lib.		NDP		2015
New Democratic	4	0	(4)	—		0
Liberal	0	—		4	0	4

==== Party rankings ====
Parties	1st	2nd	3rd	4th	5th
Liberal	4	0	0	0	0
New Democratic	0	4	0	0	0
Bloc Québécois	0	0	3	1	0
Conservative	0	0	1	3	0
Green	0	0	0	0	4

==== Results by riding ====
Electoral district	Candidates							Incumbent
Electoral district	Conservative	NDP	Liberal	BQ	Green	Marxist-Leninist	Other	Incumbent
Alfred-Pellan	Gabriel Purcarus; 6,259; 11.35%	Rosane Doré Lefebvre; 13,225; 23.97%	Angelo Iacono; 24,557; 44.51%	Daniel St-Hilaire; 9,836; 17.83%	Lynda Briguene; 1,089; 1.97%		Renata Isopo (Ind.); 203; 0.37%	Rosane Doré Lefebvre
Laval—Les Îles	Roland Dick; 9,811; 18.10%	François Pilon; 10,710; 19.76%	Fayçal El-Khoury; 25,857; 47.70%	Nancy Redhead; 6,731; 12.42%	Faiza R'Guiba-Kalogerakis; 921; 1.70%	Yvon Breton; 175; 0.32%		François Pilon
Marc-Aurèle-Fortin	Nicolas Makridis; 6,498; 11.92%	Marie-Josée Lemieux; 12,827; 23.52%	Yves Robillard; 22,323; 40.94%	Patrice Jasmin-Tremblay; 11,820; 21.68%	Lorna Mungur; 1,057; 1.94%			Alain Giguère‡
Vimy	Anthony Mavros; 7,262; 13.36%	France Duhamel; 11,391; 20.96%	Eva Nassif; 25,082; 46.15%	Barek Kaddouri; 9,068; 16.69%	José Núñez Melo; 1,280; 2.36%		Brian Jenkins (CHP); 260; 0.48%	José Núñez Melo (Note: Sat as NDP at dissolution; joined GPC after writ was issued.); Laval

=== 2011 ===
==== Seats won/lost by party ====
Party	2008	Gain from (loss to)						2011
Party	2008	Bloc		Lib.		NDP		2011
Bloc Québécois	3	—		0	0	0	(3)	0
Liberal	1	0	0	—		0	(1)	0
New Democratic	0	3	0	1	0	—		4

==== Party rankings ====
Parties	1st	2nd	3rd	4th	5th
New Democratic	4	0	0	0	0
Bloc Québécois	0	3	0	1	0
Liberal	0	1	3	0	0
Conservative	0	0	1	3	0
Green	0	0	0	0	4

==== Results by riding ====
Electoral district	Candidates							Incumbent
Electoral district	BQ	Conservative	Liberal	NDP	Green	Marxist-Leninist	Other	Incumbent
Alfred-Pellan	Robert Carrier; 12,504; 22.79%	Pierre Lefebvre; 6,157; 11.22%	Angelo G. Iacono; 12,070; 22.00%	Rosane Doré Lefebvre; 23,098; 42.09%	Dylan Perceval-Maxwell; 798; 1.45%		Régent Millette (Ind.); 245; 0.45%	Robert Carrier
Laval	Nicole Demers; 11,567; 22.73%	Robert Malo; 6,366; 12.51%	Eva Nassif; 9,422; 18.51%	José Nunez-Melo; 22,050; 43.33%	Jocelyne Leduc; 1,260; 2.48%	Yvon Breton; 224; 0.44%		Nicole Demers
Laval—Les Îles	Mohamedali Jetha; 7,022; 13.02%	Zaki Ghavitian; 8,587; 15.92%	Karine Joizil; 11,108; 20.59%	François Pilon; 25,703; 47.64%	Brent Neil; 966; 1.79%	Polyvios Tsakanikas; 194; 0.36%	Stéphane Bakhos (Pirate); 369; 0.68%	Raymonde Folco†
Marc-Aurèle-Fortin	Marie-France Charbonneau; 15,470; 26.40%	Johanne Théorêt; 5,768; 9.85%	Eduardo Gonzalo Agurto Catalán; 7,035; 12.01%	Alain Giguère; 29,107; 49.68%	Charles Sicotte; 1,208; 2.06%			Serge Ménard†

=== 2008 ===
==== Seats won/lost by party ====
Party	2006	Gain from (loss to)				2008
Party	2006	Lib.		Bloc		2008
Bloc Québécois	3	0	0	—		3
Liberal	1	—		0	0	1

==== Party rankings ====
Parties	1st	2nd	3rd	4th	5th
Bloc Québécois	3	1	0	0	0
Liberal	1	3	0	0	0
Conservative	0	0	4	0	0
New Democratic	0	0	0	4	0
Green	0	0	0	0	4

==== Results by riding ====
Electoral district	Candidates						Incumbent
Electoral district	BQ	Conservative	Liberal	NDP	Green	Other	Incumbent
Alfred-Pellan	Robert Carrier; 20,686; 38.83%	Alexandre Salameh; 8,662; 16.26%	Wilson Saintelmy; 15,594; 29.27%	Cynthia Roy; 6,406; 12.03%	Tristan Desjardins Drouin; 1,665; 3.13%	Régent Millette (Ind.); 259; 0.49%	Robert Carrier
Laval	Nicole Demers; 19,085; 37.80%	Jean-Pierre Bélisle; 9,101; 18.02%	Alia Haddad; 14,190; 28.10%	Alain Giguère; 6,289; 12.46%	Eric Madelein; 1,607; 3.18%	Yvon Breton (M-L); 221; 0.44%	Nicole Demers
Laval—Les Îles	Mohamedali Jetha; 12,576; 23.55%	Agop Evereklian; 11,017; 20.63%	Raymonde Folco; 21,603; 40.45%	Zahia El-Masri; 6,124; 11.47%	Brent Neil; 1,752; 3.28%	Sylvain A. Trottier (Rhino.); 336; 0.63%	Raymonde Folco
Marc-Aurèle-Fortin	Serge Ménard; 25,552; 45.53%	Claude Moreau; 7,759; 13.82%	Robert Frégeau; 13,728; 24.46%	Benoît Beauchamp; 6,907; 12.31%	Lise Bissonnette; 2,178; 3.88%		Serge Ménard

=== 2006 ===
==== Seats won/lost by party ====
Party	2004	Gain from (loss to)				2006
Party	2004	Lib.		Bloc		2006
Bloc Québécois	3	0	0	—		3
Liberal	1	—		0	0	1

==== Party rankings ====
For the first time since its creation, the Conservative Party achieved a second place in Laval, in the Marc-Aurèle-Fortin district, albeit far behind the Bloc québécois. Up until the 2021 elections this was the only time the modern Conservative Party obtained a better showing than third place in Laval.

Parties	1st	2nd	3rd	4th	5th
Bloc Québécois	3	1	0	0	0
Liberal	1	2	1	0	0
Conservative	0	1	3	0	0
New Democratic	0	0	0	4	0
Green	0	0	0	0	4

==== Results by riding ====
Electoral district	Candidates						Incumbent
Electoral district	BQ	Liberal	Conservative	NDP	Green	Marxist-Leninist	Incumbent
Alfred-Pellan	Robert Carrier; 23,193; 42.97%	Jean-Claude Gobé; 14,895; 27.59%	Rosane Raymond; 10,210; 18.92%	Martin Leduc; 3,838; 7.11%	Christian Lajoie; 1,842; 3.41%		Robert Carrier
Laval	Nicole Demers; 22,032; 44.35%	Alia Haddad; 12,698; 25.56%	Emilio Migliozzi; 9,236; 18.59%	Benoît Beauchamp; 4,047; 8.15%	Philippe Mari; 1,666; 3.35%		Nicole Demers
Laval—Les Îles	Christiane Pichette; 17,537; 33.07%	Raymonde Folco; 20,849; 39.32%	Qais Hamidi; 9,055; 17.08%	Alain Giguère; 3,817; 7.20%	Theodore Kouretas; 1,557; 2.94%	Polyvios Tsakanikas; 211; 0.40%	Raymonde Folco
Marc-Aurèle-Fortin	Serge Ménard; 27,638; 51.00%	Renée Gagné; 8,407; 15.51%	Claude Moreau; 11,098; 20.48%	Martin Duplantis; 4,313; 7.96%	Lise Bissonnette; 2,733; 5.04%		Serge Ménard

=== 2004 ===
==== Seats won/lost by party ====
Party	2000	Gain from (loss to)				2004
Party	2000	Lib.		Bloc		2004
Liberal	2	—		0	(1)	1
Bloc Québécois	1	+1	0	—		3 (Note: A new seat (Laval) was picked up by the Bloc in the election.)

==== Party rankings ====
Parties	1st	2nd	3rd	4th	5th
Bloc Québécois	3	1	0	0	0
Liberal	1	3	0	0	0
Conservative	0	0	4	0	0
New Democratic	0	0	0	3	1
Green	0	0	0	1	3

==== Results by riding ====
Electoral district	Candidates							Incumbent
Electoral district	Liberal	BQ	Conservative	NDP	Green	Marijuana	Other	Incumbent
Alfred-Pellan	Carole-Marie Allard; 21,116; 39.59%	Robert Carrier; 26,239; 49.20%	Rosane Raymond; 2,703; 5.07%	Benjamin Le Bel; 1,849; 3.47%	Louis-Philippe Verenka; 1,132; 2.12%		Yves Desbois (Ind.); 204 0.38%	Carole-Marie Allard; Laval East
Alfred-Pellan	Carole-Marie Allard; 21,116; 39.59%	Robert Carrier; 26,239; 49.20%	Rosane Raymond; 2,703; 5.07%	Benjamin Le Bel; 1,849; 3.47%	Louis-Philippe Verenka; 1,132; 2.12%		Régent Millette (Ind.); 89 0.17%	Carole-Marie Allard; Laval East
Laval	Pierre Lafleur; 17,639; 36.18%	Nicole Demers; 24,425; 50.09%	Stéphane d'Amours; 3,115; 6.39%	Alain Giguère; 1,998; 4.10%	Damien Pichereau; 1,091; 2.24%	Pierre Losier-Côté; 492; 1.01%		new district
Laval—Les Îles	Raymonde Folco; 23,985; 47.86%	Micaël Poirier; 18,597; 37.11%	Jean-Paul Pratte; 3,498; 6.98%	Paul Michaud; 2,202; 4.39%	Pierre Véronneau; 1,178; 2.35%	Michel Allard; 498; 0.99%	Polyvios Tsakanikas (M.-L.); 154; 0.31%	Raymonde Folco; Laval West
Marc-Aurèle-Fortin	Nancy Girard; 14,491; 27.72%	Serge Ménard; 30,779; 58.88%	Marc Bissonnette; 3,125; 5.98%	Lyse Généreux; 1,867; 3.57%	Lise Bissonnette; 2,012; 3.85%			Madeleine Dalphond-Guiral§ Laval Centre

==== Maps ====
1. Ahuntsic
2. Alfred-Pellan
3. Bourassa
4. Laval
5. Laval-les Îles
6. Marc-Aurèle-Fortin
7. Papineau
8. Saint-Léonard-Saint-Michel
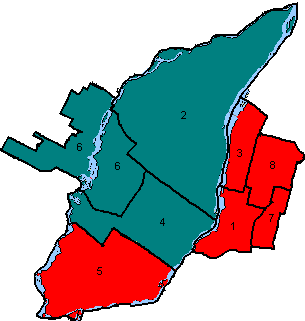
Key map

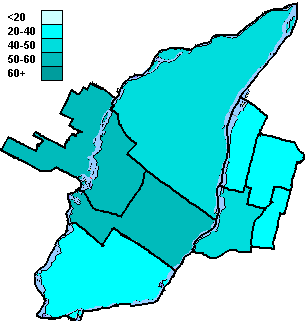
Bloc Québécois

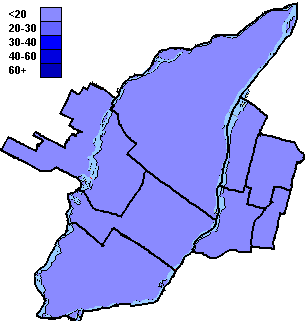
Conservative Party of Canada

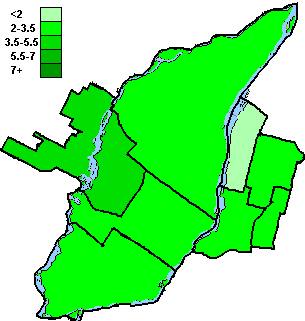
Green Party of Canada

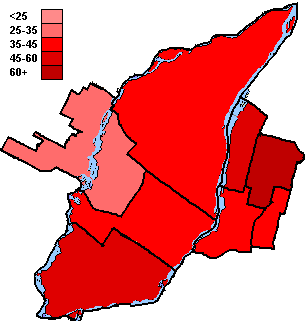
Liberal Party of Canada

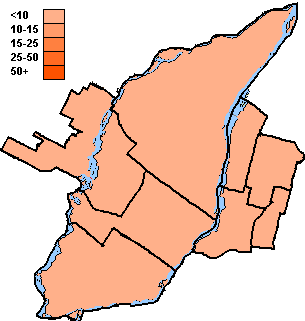
New Democratic Party

=== 2000 ===
==== Seats won/lost by party ====
Party	1997	Gain from (loss to)				2000
Party	1997	Lib.		Bloc		2000
Bloc Québécois	2	0	(1)	—		1
Liberal	1	—		1	0	2

==== Party rankings ====
In its low point in the region, all the candidates fielded by the NDP arrived last of all the major federal parties, even getting fewer votes than the Green Party in all three districts and the Marijuana Party candidate in Laval East.

Parties	1st	2nd	3rd	4th	5th	6th	7th
Liberal	2	1	0	0	0	0	0
Bloc Québécois	1	2	0	0	0	0	0
Progressive Conservative	0	0	2	1	0	0	0
Alliance	0	0	1	2	0	0	0
Green	0	0	0	0	2	1	0
New Democratic	0	0	0	0	0	2	1
Marijuana	0	0	0	0	0	1	0

==== Results by riding ====
Electoral district	Candidates								Incumbent
Electoral district	BQ	Liberal	Canadian Alliance	NDP	PC	Green	Marxist-Leninist	Other	Incumbent
Laval Centre	Madeleine Dalphond-Guiral; 23,746; 43.35%	Pierre Lafleur; 23,704; 43.27%	Eric Marchand; 2,437; 4.45%	Jean-Yves Dion; 832; 1.52%	Guy Fortin; 2,778; 5.07%	Julien Bernard; 1,285; 2.35%			Madeleine Dalphond-Guiral
Laval East	Mathieu Alarie; 24,726; 42.55%	Carole-Marie Allard; 26,018; 44.77%	Rosane Raymond; 2,354; 4.05%	Sujata Dey; 573; 0.99%	André G. Plourde; 2,459; 4.23%	Frédéric Gauvin; 660; 1.14%	Gabriel Cornellier-Brunelle; 178; 0.31%	Christian Lajoie (Mar.); 892 1.53% Régent Millette (Ind.); 255 0.44%	Maud Debien†
Laval West	Manon Sauvé; 19,975; 32.27%	Raymonde Folco; 31,758; 51.30%	Leo Housakos; 4,631; 7.48%	Christian Patenaude; 764; 1.23%	Michael M. Fortier; 3,613; 5.84%	Luc Beaulieu; 983; 1.59%	Polyvios Tsakanikas; 180; 0.29%		Raymonde Folco

=== 1997 ===
==== Seats won/lost by party ====
Party	1993	Gain from (loss to)				1997
Party	1993	Lib.		Bloc		1997
Bloc Québécois	2	0	0	—		2
Liberal	1	—		0	0	1

==== Results by riding ====
Electoral district	Candidates				Incumbent
Electoral district	BQ	Liberal	NDP	PC	Incumbent
Laval Centre	Madeleine Dalphond-Guiral; 22,668	Sylvie Matteau; 20,222	Jean-Yves Dion; 1,188	Alain Dubois; 13,132	Madeleine Dalphond-Guiral
Laval East	Maud Debien; 23,093	Nathalie Paradis; 19,279	Peter Graefe; 765	Vincent Della Noce; 16,912	Maud Debien
Laval West	Sylvain Gauthier; 19,547	Raymonde Folco; 31,566	Karina Ziedler; 1,702	Yves Désormeaux; 12,365	Michel Dupuy†

=== 1993 ===
==== Seats won/lost by party ====
Party	1988	Gain from (loss to)						1993
Party	1988	PC		Lib.		Bloc		1993
Progressive Conservative	3	—		0	(1)	0	(2)	0
Liberal	0	1	0	—		0	0	1
Bloc Québécois	0	2	0	0	0	—		2

==== Party rankings ====
Parties	1st	2nd	3rd	4th	5th
Bloc Québécois	2	1	0	0	0
Liberal	1	2	0	0	0
Progressive Conservative	0	0	3	0	0
New Democratic	0	0	0	2	1
Natural Law	0	0	0	1	2

==== Results by riding ====
Electoral district	Candidates							Incumbent
Electoral district	PC	Liberal	NDP	BQ	Natural Law	Commonwealth of Canada	Other	Incumbent
1. Laval Centre	Bruno Fortier; 4,497	Guymond Fortin; 19,027	Afsun Qureshi; 630	Madeleine Dalphond-Guiral; 31,391	Yvon Dodier; 662	Michel Destroismaisons; 268	Joe De Santis (Nat.); 323; Emilien Martel (Abol.); 172	Jacques Tétreault^{1} Laval-des-Rapides
2. Laval East	Vincent Della Noce; 11,140	Raymonde Folco; 16,196	Stéphane Houle; 656	Maud Debien; 31,210	Denis Cauchon; 586	François Lépine; 121	Denise Beaubien (Abol.); 359	Vincent Della Noce; Duvernay
3. Laval West	Guy Ricard; 4,167	Michel Dupuy; 28,449	Marcella Tardif-Provencher; 678	Michel Leduc; 26,460	Eddy Gagné; 546	John Ajemian; 187	Rick Blatter (Libert.); 649; Cyril G. MacNeil (Nat.); 280; Georges Vaudrin (Abol.); 109	Guy Ricard; Laval

==== Maps ====
Key map

=== 1988 ===
==== Seats won/lost by party ====
Party	1984	Gain from (loss to)				1988
Party	1984	PC		Lib.		1988
Progressive Conservative	2	—		1	0	3
Liberal	1	0	(1)	—		0

==== Party rankings ====
Parties	1st	2nd	3rd
Progressive Conservative	3	0	0
Liberal	0	3	0
New Democratic	0	0	3

==== Results by riding ====
Electoral district	Candidates						Incumbent
Electoral district	PC	Liberal	NDP	Green	Commonwealth of Canada	Social Credit	Incumbent
Duvernay	Vincent Della Noce; 33,426	Pierre Amaranian; 12,607	Michel Agnaieff; 8,147		Brigitte Bergeron; 368	Émilien Martel; 480	Vincent Della Noce
Laval	Guy Ricard; 26,858	Céline Hervieux-Payette; 18,819	Paul Cappon; 8,546		Mario Ouellet; 468		Guy Ricard
Laval-des-Rapides	Jacques Tétreault; 27,955	François Arsenault; 14,926	John Shatilla; 7,397	Paul Savard; 1,511	Pierre Vigneault; 224		Raymond Garneau (Note: Ran in Ahunstic and was defeated by PC candidate Nicole Roy-Arcelin.)

=== 1984 ===
==== Party rankings ====
Parties	1st	2nd	3rd	4th
Progressive Conservative	2	1	0	0
Liberal	1	2	0	0
New Democratic	0	0	3	0
Parti nationaliste	0	0	0	2
Rhinoceros	0	0	0	1

==== Results by riding ====
Electoral district	Candidates							Incumbent
Electoral district	PC	Liberal	NDP	Parti nationaliste	Rhinoceros	PCC	Others	Incumbent
Duvernay	Vincent Della Noce; 29,877	Yves Demers; 18,465	John Shatilla; 5,013	Denis Monière; 3,195	Patrice Charlot St-Onge; 2,088	Pierre Leheurteux; 66	A. Léo Larocque; 453; Émilien Martel (SC); 174	Yves Demers
Laval	Guy Ricard; 30,696	Marcel-Claude Roy; 23,002	John Fasciano; 8,158	Conrad Monière; 2,331		Jean-Claude Souvray; 299		Marcel-Claude Roy
Laval-des-Rapides	Lawrence Hanigan; 20,420	Raymond Garneau; 22,789	Léo St-Louis; 5,215	Denis Bertrand; 1,492	Serge Lafortune; 1,910	François Lépine; 90		Jeanne Sauvé (Note: Was sworn in as Governor General of Canada on 14 May 1984.)

=== 1980 ===
==== Party rankings ====
Parties	1st	2nd	3rd
Liberal	3	0	0
New Democratic	0	3	0
Progressive Conservative	0	0	3

==== Results by riding ====
Electoral district	Candidates				Incumbent
Electoral district	Liberal	PC	NDP	Others	Incumbent
Duvernay	Yves Demers; 34,560	Pierre Pelletier; 3,647	John Shatilla; 5,069	4,439	Yves Demers
Laval	Marcel-Claude Roy; 38,580	Jean-Louis Léger; 3,715	Lauraine Vaillancourt; 5,709	3,202	Marcel-Claude Roy
Laval-des-Rapides	Jeanne Sauvé; 33,317	Guy Villiard; 3,049	Martin Vaillancourt; 4,699	3,379	Jeanne Sauvé

=== 1979 ===
==== Party rankings ====
Parties	1st	2nd	3rd	4th
Liberal	3	0	0	0
Progressive Conservative	0	2	1	0
Social Credit	0	1	2	0
New Democratic	0	0	0	3

==== Results by riding ====
Electoral district	Candidates					Incumbent
Electoral district	Liberal	Social Credit	PC	NDP	Others	Incumbent
Duvernay	Yves Demers; 35,270	François Chagnon; 7,446	Richard B. Morin; 4,152	John Shatilla; 2,839	2,059	Yves Demers
Laval	Marcel-Claude Roy; 40,067	Madeleine Piquette Bédard; 4,592	Jean-Louis Léger; 5,484	Lauraine Vaillancourt; 3,521	1,543	Marcel-Claude Roy; Laval
Laval-des-Rapides	Jeanne Sauvé (Note: Jeanne Sauvé was elected in 1972 and 1974 in the Ahuntsic riding on the Island of Montreal.); 36,387	Jean-Luc Roualdes; 4,779	Pierre Trudeau; 5,033	Pierre Ivan Laroche; 3,702	726	New district

== See also ==
- For earlier results, please see Canadian federal election results in Northern Montreal.
