= List of women elected to Canadian Parliament =

List of women elected in Canadian Parliament

Women have served in the Canadian House of Commons since the 1921 entrance of Agnes MacPhail, a member of the Progressive Party of Canada from Grey Southeast. Over 410 women have since served in the House. From the start of the 45th Canadian Parliament, there are 106 female MPs, or 31.0% of the body, the highest in Canada's history. Thirty-seven of them were elected in the 2025 federal election, with an additional two from subsequent by-elections in 2026. This represents a gain of three seats from the previous record of 103 women in the 44th Canadian Parliament, of whom 101 were elected in the 2021 federal election, alongside two more in by-elections in 2023 and 2024.

Women have been elected to the House of Commons from every province and territory in Canada.

== House of Commons ==
=== First elected before 1993 ===
Member of Parliament	Riding	Took office	Left office	Party	Ref.	Note
Agnes Macphail (1890–1954)	Grey Southeast	December 6, 1921	March 25, 1940	Progressive		First woman elected to Parliament; First Scottish-Canadian woman elected to Parliament; First Progressive Party woman elected to Parliament; First woman elected to Parliament from Ontario
Martha Black (1866–1957)	Yukon	October 14, 1935	March 25, 1940	Independent Conservative		First American-Canadian woman elected to Parliament; First Independent woman elected to Parliament; First woman elected to Parliament from Yukon
Dorise Nielsen (1902–1980)	North Battleford	March 26, 1940	June 10, 1945	Unity		First English-Canadian woman elected to Parliament; Only Labor-Progressive or Unity (i.e., Communist) woman elected to Parliament; First woman elected to Parliament from Saskatchewan
Dorise Nielsen (1902–1980)	North Battleford	March 26, 1940	June 10, 1945	Labor-Progressive		First English-Canadian woman elected to Parliament; Only Labor-Progressive or Unity (i.e., Communist) woman elected to Parliament; First woman elected to Parliament from Saskatchewan
Cora Taylor Casselman (1888–1964)	Edmonton East	June 2, 1941	June 10, 1945	Liberal		First Liberal Party woman elected to Parliament; First woman of either of the two main parties elected First woman elected to Parliament from Alberta; First woman elected in a by-election
Gladys Strum (1906–2005)	Qu'Appelle	June 11, 1945	June 26, 1949	CCF		First CCF/NDP woman elected to Parliament
Ellen Fairclough (1905–2004)	Hamilton West	May 15, 1950	April 7, 1963	Progressive Conservative		First Conservative woman elected to Parliament; First woman to serve in Cabinet; Secretary of State for Canada (1957–1958); Minister of Citizenship and Immigration (1958–1962); Postmaster General (1962–1963)
Margaret Aitken (1908–1980)	York—Humber	August 10, 1953	June 17, 1962	Progressive Conservative		First woman appointed to chair a Parliamentary Committee
Sybil Bennett (1904–1956)	Halton	August 10, 1953	November 12, 1956	Progressive Conservative		First woman to die in office
Ann Shipley (1899–1981)	Timiskaming	August 10, 1953	June 9, 1957	Liberal		First woman to move the address in reply to the Speech from the Throne
Jean Casselman Wadds (1920–2011)	Grenville—Dundas	September 29, 1958	June 24, 1968	Progressive Conservative		First woman to be appointed a Parliamentary Secretary first woman to serve in the House of Commons alongside her father
Judy LaMarsh (1924–1980)	Niagara Falls	October 31, 1960	June 24, 1968	Liberal		Minister of Health (1963–1965); Minister of Sport (1963–1965); Secretary of State for Canada (1965–1968)
Margaret Mary Macdonald (1910–1968)	Kings	May 29, 1961	April 7, 1963	Progressive Conservative		First woman elected to Parliament from Prince Edward Island
Isabel Hardie (1916–2006)	Northwest Territories	June 18, 1962	April 7, 1963	Liberal		First woman elected to Parliament from the Northwest Territories
Pauline Jewett (1922–1992)	Northumberland	April 8, 1963	November 7, 1965	Liberal		First woman elected to Parliament as a candidate from more than one party
Pauline Jewett (1922–1992)	New Westminster—Coquitlam	May 22, 1979	November 20, 1988	NDP		First woman elected to Parliament as a candidate from more than one party
Margaret Konantz (1899–1967)	Winnipeg South	April 8, 1963	November 7, 1965	Liberal		First woman elected to Parliament from Manitoba
Eloise Jones (1917–2004)	Saskatoon	June 22, 1964	November 7, 1965	Progressive Conservative		
Margaret Rideout (1923–2010)	Westmorland	November 9, 1964	June 24, 1968	Liberal		First woman elected to Parliament from New Brunswick
Grace MacInnis (1905–1991)	Vancouver Kingsway	November 8, 1965	July 7, 1974	NDP		First woman elected to Parliament from British Columbia
Monique Bégin (1936–2023)	Saint-Léonard—Anjou	October 30, 1972	September 3, 1984	Liberal		First Italian-Canadian woman elected to Parliament; First woman elected to Parliament from Quebec (of 3); Minister of National Revenue (1976–1977); Minister of Health (1977–1979, 1980–1984)
Flora MacDonald (1926–2015)	Kingston and the Islands	October 30, 1972	November 20, 1988	Progressive Conservative		Minister of Foreign Affairs (1979–1980); Minister of Employment and Immigration (1984–1986); Minister of Communications (1986–1988)
Albanie Morin (1921–1976)	Louis-Hébert	October 30, 1972	September 30, 1976	Liberal		First woman elected to Parliament from Quebec (of 3)
Jeanne Sauvé (1922–1993)	Laval-des-Rapides	October 30, 1972	January 15, 1984	Liberal		First woman elected to Parliament from Quebec (of 3); First woman to be Speaker of the House of Commons; First woman to be appointed Governor General; Minister of the Environment (1974–1975); Minister of Communications (1975–1979); Speaker of the House of Commons (1980–1984)
Ursula Appolloni (1929–1994)	York South—Weston	July 8, 1974	September 3, 1984	Liberal		First Irish-Canadian woman elected to Parliament
Iona Campagnolo (1932–2024)	Skeena	July 8, 1974	May 21, 1979	Liberal		First woman to be President of a Political Party; Minister for Sport (1976–1979); Liberal Party President (1982–1984)
Coline Campbell (born 1940)	Southwestern Nova	July 8, 1974	May 21, 1979	Liberal		First woman elected to Parliament from Nova Scotia
Coline Campbell (born 1940)	Southwestern Nova	February 18, 1980	September 3, 1984	Liberal		First woman elected to Parliament from Nova Scotia
Coline Campbell (born 1940)	Southwestern Nova	November 21, 1988	October 24, 1993	Liberal		First woman elected to Parliament from Nova Scotia
Simma Holt (1922–2015)	Vancouver Kingsway	July 8, 1974	May 21, 1979	Liberal		First Jewish woman elected to Parliament
Aideen Nicholson (1927–2019)	Trinity	July 8, 1974	November 20, 1988	Liberal		
Jean Pigott (1924–2012)	Ottawa—Carleton	October 18, 1976	May 21, 1979	Progressive Conservative		
Celine Hervieux-Payette (born 1941)	Mercier	May 22, 1979	September 3, 1984	Liberal		Minister for Sport (1983–1984); Minister for Youth (1984); Canadian Senator (1995–2016)
Marie Thérèse Killens (born 1927)	Saint-Michel—Ahuntsic	May 22, 1979	November 20, 1988	Liberal		
Margaret Mitchell (1925–2017)	Vancouver East	May 22, 1979	October 24, 1993	NDP		
Diane Stratas (1932–2023)	Scarborough Centre	May 22, 1979	February 17, 1980	Progressive Conservative		First Greek-Canadian woman elected to Parliament
Suzanne Beauchamp-Niquet (1932–2011)	Roberval	February 18, 1980	September 3, 1984	Liberal		
Pat Carney (1935–2023)	Vancouver Centre	February 18, 1980	November 20, 1988	Progressive Conservative		First woman to be appointed to a senior economic cabinet portfolio Minister of Energy (1984–1986); Minister of International Trade (1986–1988); President of the Treasury Board (1988)
Eva Côté (1932–2019)	Rimouski	February 18, 1980	September 3, 1984	Liberal		
Judy Erola (born 1934)	Nickel Belt	February 18, 1980	September 3, 1984	Liberal		First Finnish-Canadian woman elected to Parliament; Minister for Mines (1980–1983); Minister for Status of Women (1981–1984); Minister of Consumer and Corporate Affairs (1983–1984)
Jennifer Cossitt (born 1948)	Leeds—Grenville	October 12, 1982	November 20, 1988	Progressive Conservative		
Lynn McDonald (born 1940)	Broadview-Greenwood	October 12, 1982	November 20, 1988	NDP		
Gabrielle Bertrand (1923–1999)	Brome—Missisquoi	September 4, 1984	October 24, 1993	Progressive Conservative		
Suzanne Blais-Grenier (1936–2017)	Rosemont	September 4, 1984	November 20, 1988	Progressive Conservative		Minister of the Environment (1984–1985); Minister for Transport (1985); First woman expelled from her original party's caucus
Suzanne Blais-Grenier (1936–2017)	Rosemont	September 4, 1984	November 20, 1988	Independent		Minister of the Environment (1984–1985); Minister for Transport (1985); First woman expelled from her original party's caucus
Anne Blouin (born 1946)	Montmorency—Orléans	September 4, 1984	November 20, 1988	Progressive Conservative		
Lise Bourgault (born 1950)	Argenteuil—Papineau	September 4, 1984	October 24, 1993	Progressive Conservative		
Pauline Browes (born 1938)	Scarborough Centre	September 4, 1984	October 24, 1993	Progressive Conservative		Minister of State (Environment) (1991–1993); Minister for Aboriginal Affairs (1993)
Andrée Champagne (1939–2020)	Saint-Hyacinthe—Bagot	September 4, 1984	October 24, 1993	Progressive Conservative		Minister for Youth (1984–1986)
Mary Collins (born 1940)	Capilano	September 4, 1984	October 24, 1993	Progressive Conservative		Minister for the Status of Women (1990–1993); Minister of Health (1993); Minister for Sport (1993)
Sheila Copps (born 1952)	Hamilton East	September 4, 1984	June 27, 2004	Liberal		Deputy Prime Minister (1993–1997); Minister of the Environment (1993–1996); Minister for Communications (1996); Minister of Canadian Heritage (1996–2003)
Sheila Finestone (1927–2009)	Mount Royal	September 4, 1984	August 10, 1999	Liberal		Minister for the Status of Women (1993–1996)
Suzanne Duplessis (born 1940)	Louis-Hébert	September 4, 1984	October 24, 1993	Progressive Conservative		
Carole Jacques (born 1960)	Mercier	September 4, 1984	October 24, 1993	Progressive Conservative		
Monique Landry (born 1937)	Blainville—Deux-Montagnes	September 4, 1984	October 24, 1993	Progressive Conservative		Minister for External Relations (1986–1993); Minister of Communications (1993)
Claudy Mailly (born 1938)	Gatineau	September 4, 1984	November 20, 1988	Progressive Conservative		
Shirley Martin (1932–2021)	Lincoln	September 4, 1984	October 24, 1993	Progressive Conservative		Progressive Conservative Caucus Chair (1988); Minister of State (Transport) (1988–1990, 1991–1993)
Barbara McDougall (born 1937)	St. Paul's	September 4, 1984	October 24, 1993	Progressive Conservative		Minister for the Status of Women (1986–1990); Minister for Employment (1988–1991); Minister for Foreign Affairs (1991–1993)
Lucie Pépin (born 1936)	Outremont	September 4, 1984	November 20, 1988	Liberal		
Bobbie Sparrow (born 1935)	Calgary Southwest	September 4, 1984	October 24, 1993	Progressive Conservative		Minister of Energy (1993)
Monique Tardif (1936–2016)	Charlesbourg	September 4, 1984	October 24, 1993	Progressive Conservative		
Monique Vézina (born 1935)	Rimouski—Témiscouata	September 4, 1984	October 24, 1993	Progressive Conservative		Minister of External Relations (1984–1986, 1993); Minister for Supply and Services (1986–1987); Minister for Seniors (1988–1993)
Marion Dewar (1928–2008)	Hamilton Mountain	July 20, 1987	November 20, 1988	NDP		
Audrey McLaughlin (born 1936)	Yukon	July 20, 1987	June 1, 1997	NDP		NDP Leader (1989–1995)
Edna Anderson (1922–2019)	Simcoe Centre	November 21, 1988	October 24, 1993	Progressive Conservative		
Dawn Black (born 1943)	New Westminster—Burnaby	November 21, 1988	October 24, 1993	NDP		
Dawn Black (born 1943)	New Westminster—Coquitlam	January 23, 2006	April 13, 2009	NDP		
Ethel Blondin-Andrew (born 1951)	Western Arctic	November 21, 1988	January 22, 2006	Liberal		First Indigenous woman elected to Parliament; Minister of Children and Youth Development (1993–2004); Minister for Northern Development (2004–2006)
Catherine Callbeck (born 1951)	Malpeque	November 21, 1988	January 25, 1993	Liberal		
Kim Campbell (born 1947)	Vancouver Centre	November 21, 1988	October 24, 1993	Progressive Conservative		Only woman Prime Minister of Canada (1993); Leader of the Conservative Party (1993–1994); Minister of Justice (1990–1993); Minister of Defence (1993)
Marlene Catterall (born 1939)	Ottawa West—Nepean	November 21, 1988	January 22, 2006	Liberal		Chief Government Whip (2001–2003)
Mary Clancy (born 1948)	Halifax	November 21, 1988	June 1, 1997	Liberal		
Dorothy Dobbie (born 1945)	Winnipeg South	November 21, 1988	October 24, 1993	Progressive Conservative		
Louise Feltham (1935–2020)	Wild Rose	November 21, 1988	October 24, 1993	Progressive Conservative		
Beryl Gaffney (born 1930)	Nepean	November 21, 1988	June 1, 1997	Liberal		
Marie Gibeau (1950–2002)	Bourassa	November 21, 1988	October 24, 1993	Progressive Conservative		
Barbara Greene (born 1945)	Don Valley North	November 21, 1988	October 24, 1993	Progressive Conservative		
Albina Guarnieri (born 1953)	Mississauga East—Cooksville	November 21, 1988	May 1, 2011	Liberal		Minister of Veterans Affairs (2004–2006)
Lynn Hunter (born 1947)	Saanich—Gulf Islands	November 21, 1988	October 24, 1993	NDP		
Joy Langan (1943–2009)	Mission—Coquitlam	November 21, 1988	October 24, 1993	NDP		
Shirley Maheu (1931–2006)	Saint-Laurent—Cartierville	November 21, 1988	January 31, 1996	Liberal		
Diane Marleau (1943–2013)	Sudbury	November 21, 1988	October 13, 2008	Liberal		Minister of Health (1993–1996); Minister of Public Works (1996–1997); Minister of International Cooperation (1997–1999)
Beth Phinney (born 1938)	Hamilton Mountain	November 21, 1988	January 22, 2006	Liberal		
Nicole Roy-Arcelin (born 1941)	Ahuntsic	November 21, 1988	October 24, 1993	Progressive Conservative		
Christine Stewart (1941–2015)	Northumberland	November 21, 1988	November 26, 2000	Liberal		Minister of the Environment (1997–1999)
Pierrette Venne (born 1945)	Saint-Bruno—Saint-Hubert	November 21, 1988	June 27, 2004	Progressive Conservative		First Bloc Québécois woman (re-)elected to Parliament (of 8); also the first to cross the floor during her term and to be expelled from her new party's caucus
Pierrette Venne (born 1945)	Saint-Bruno—Saint-Hubert	November 21, 1988	June 27, 2004	Bloc Québécois		First Bloc Québécois woman (re-)elected to Parliament (of 8); also the first to cross the floor during her term and to be expelled from her new party's caucus
Pierrette Venne (born 1945)	Saint-Bruno—Saint-Hubert	November 21, 1988	June 27, 2004	Independent		First Bloc Québécois woman (re-)elected to Parliament (of 8); also the first to cross the floor during her term and to be expelled from her new party's caucus
Deborah Grey (born 1952)	Beaver River	March 13, 1989	April 27, 1997	Reform		Interim leader of the Canadian Alliance and Leader of the Official Opposition (2000)
Deborah Grey (born 1952)	Edmonton North	June 2, 1997	June 27, 2004	Reform		Interim leader of the Canadian Alliance and Leader of the Official Opposition (2000)
Deborah Grey (born 1952)	Edmonton North	June 2, 1997	June 27, 2004	Alliance		Interim leader of the Canadian Alliance and Leader of the Official Opposition (2000)
Deborah Grey (born 1952)	Edmonton North	June 2, 1997	June 27, 2004	Conservative		Interim leader of the Canadian Alliance and Leader of the Official Opposition (2000)

=== First elected 1993–2008 ===
Member of Parliament	Riding	Took office	Left office	Party	Ref.	Note
Diane Ablonczy (born 1949)	Calgary Nose Hill	October 25, 1993	October 18, 2015	Reform		Minister of Small Business and Tourism (2007–2010); Minister for Seniors (2010–2011); Minister for Consular Affairs (2011–2013)
Diane Ablonczy (born 1949)	Calgary Nose Hill	October 25, 1993	October 18, 2015	Alliance		Minister of Small Business and Tourism (2007–2010); Minister for Seniors (2010–2011); Minister for Consular Affairs (2011–2013)
Diane Ablonczy (born 1949)	Calgary Nose Hill	October 25, 1993	October 18, 2015	Conservative		Minister of Small Business and Tourism (2007–2010); Minister for Seniors (2010–2011); Minister for Consular Affairs (2011–2013)
Jean Augustine (born 1937)	Etobicoke—Lakeshore	October 25, 1993	January 22, 2006	Liberal		First Black Canadian and Grenadian-Canadian woman elected to Parliament; Minister for Multiculturalism (2002–2004); Minister for Status of Women (2002–2004)
Eleni Bakopanos (born 1954)	Ahuntsic	October 25, 1993	January 22, 2006	Liberal		
Sue Barnes (born 1952)	London West	October 25, 1993	October 13, 2008	Liberal		
Colleen Beaumier (born 1944)	Brampton West	October 25, 1993	October 13, 2008	Liberal		
Judy Bethel (born 1943)	Edmonton East	October 25, 1993	June 1, 1997	Liberal		
Margaret Bridgman (1940–2009)	Surrey North	October 25, 1993	June 1, 1997	Reform		
Bonnie Brown (born 1943)	Oakville	October 25, 1993	October 13, 2008	Liberal		
Jan Brown (born 1947)	Calgary Southeast	October 25, 1993	June 1, 1997	Reform		First Croatian-Canadian woman elected to Parliament
Jan Brown (born 1947)	Calgary Southeast	October 25, 1993	June 1, 1997	Independent		First Croatian-Canadian woman elected to Parliament
Dianne Brushett (1942–2017)	Cumberland—Colchester	October 25, 1993	June 1, 1997	Liberal		
Brenda Chamberlain (born 1952)	Guelph	October 25, 1993	April 7, 2008	Liberal		
Shaughnessy Cohen (1948–1998)	Windsor—St. Clair	October 25, 1993	December 9, 1998	Liberal		
Marlene Cowling (born 1941)	Dauphin—Swan River	October 25, 1993	June 1, 1997	Liberal		
Madeleine Dalphond-Guiral (born 1938)	Laval Centre	October 25, 1993	June 27, 2004	Bloc Québécois		First Bloc Québécois woman elected to Parliament (of 8); Chief Opposition Whip (1996–1997)
Maud Debien (born 1938)	Laval East	October 25, 1993	November 26, 2000	Bloc Québécois		First Bloc Québécois woman elected to Parliament (of 8)
Hedy Fry (born 1941)	Vancouver Centre	October 25, 1993	Incumbent	Liberal		First Eurasian and Trinidadian-Canadian woman elected to Parliament; Minister for Multiculturalism (1996–2002); Minister for Status of Women (1996–2002); Longest-serving female MP
Christiane Gagnon (born 1948)	Québec	October 25, 1993	May 1, 2011	Bloc Québécois		First Bloc Québécois woman elected to Parliament (of 8)
Monique Guay (born 1959)	Riviere-du-Nord	October 25, 1993	May 1, 2011	Bloc Québécois		First Bloc Québécois woman elected to Parliament (of 8)
Sharon Hayes (born 1948)	Port Moody—Coquitlam	October 25, 1993	October 1, 1997	Reform		
Bonnie Hickey (born 1955)	St. John's East	October 25, 1993	June 1, 1997	Liberal		
Daphne Jennings (born 1939)	Mission—Coquitlam	October 25, 1993	June 1, 1997	Reform		
Karen Kraft Sloan (born 1952)	York North	October 25, 1993	June 27, 2004	Liberal		
Francine Lalonde (1940–2014)	La Pointe-de-l'Île	October 25, 1993	May 1, 2011	Bloc Québécois		First Bloc Québécois woman elected to Parliament (of 8)
Anne McLellan (born 1950)	Edmonton Centre	October 25, 1993	January 22, 2006	Liberal		Minister of Natural Resources (1993–1997); Minister of Justice (1997–2002); Minister of Health (2002–2003); Deputy Prime Minister (2003–2006); Minister of Public Safety (2003–2006)
Val Meredith (born 1949)	South Surrey—White Rock	October 25, 1993	June 17, 2004	Reform		
Val Meredith (born 1949)	South Surrey—White Rock	October 25, 1993	June 17, 2004	Alliance		
Val Meredith (born 1949)	South Surrey—White Rock	October 25, 1993	June 17, 2004	Conservative		
Maria Minna (born 1948)	Beaches—East York	October 25, 1993	May 1, 2011	Liberal		Minister of International Cooperation (1999–2002)
Carolyn Parrish (born 1946)	Mississauga—Erindale	October 25, 1993	January 22, 2006	Liberal		
Carolyn Parrish (born 1946)	Mississauga—Erindale	October 25, 1993	January 22, 2006	Independent		
Jean Payne (1948–2020)	St. John's West	October 25, 1993	June 1, 1997	Liberal		
Pauline Picard (1947–2009)	Drummond	October 25, 1993	October 13, 2008	Bloc Québécois		First Bloc Québécois woman elected to Parliament (of 8)
Pierrette Ringuette (born 1955)	Madawaska—Victoria	October 25, 1993	June 1, 1997	Liberal		
Georgette Sheridan (born 1952)	Saskatoon—Humboldt	October 25, 1993	June 1, 1997	Liberal		
Roseanne Skoke (born 1954)	Central Nova	October 25, 1993	June 1, 1997	Liberal		
Jane Stewart (born 1955)	Brant	October 25, 1993	June 27, 2004	Liberal		Minister of National Revenue (1996–1997); Minister of Aboriginal Affairs (1997–1999); Minister of Human Resources (1999–2003)
Anna Terrana (born 1937)	Vancouver East	October 25, 1993	June 1, 1997	Liberal		
Paddy Torsney (born 1962)	Burlington	October 25, 1993	January 22, 2006	Liberal		
Suzanne Tremblay (1937–2020)	Rimouski-Neigette-et-La Mitis	October 25, 1993	June 27, 2004	Bloc Québécois		First Bloc Québécois woman elected to Parliament (of 8)
Rose-Marie Ur (born 1946)	Lambton—Kent—Middlesex	October 25, 1993	January 22, 2006	Liberal		
Elsie Wayne (1932–2016)	Saint John	October 25, 1993	June 27, 2004	Progressive Conservative		Conservative Deputy Leader (2002–2004)
Elsie Wayne (1932–2016)	Saint John	October 25, 1993	June 27, 2004	Conservative		Conservative Deputy Leader (2002–2004)
Susan Whelan (born 1963)	Essex	October 25, 1993	June 27, 2004	Liberal		Minister of International Cooperation (2002–2003)
Lucienne Robillard (born 1945)	Westmount—Ville-Marie	February 13, 1995	June 27, 2004	Liberal		Minister of Labour (1995–1996); Minister of Citizenship and Immigration (1996–1999); President of the Treasury Board (1999–2003); Minister of Industry (2003–2004); Minister of Intergovernmental Affairs (2004–2006)
Hélène Alarie (1941–2023)	Louis-Hébert	June 2, 1997	November 26, 2000	Bloc Québécois		
Carolyn Bennett (born 1950)	Toronto—St. Paul's	June 2, 1997	January 16, 2024	Liberal		Minister for Public Health (2003–2006); Minister of Crown–Indigenous Relations and Northern Affairs/Crown–Indigenous Relations (2015–2021); Minister of Mental Health and Addictions (2021–2023)
Claudette Bradshaw (1949–2022)	Moncton—Riverview—Dieppe	June 2, 1997	January 22, 2006	Liberal		Minister for Labour (1998–2004)
Sarmite Bulte (born 1953)	Parkdale—High Park	June 2, 1997	January 22, 2006	Liberal		First Latvian-Canadian woman elected to Parliament
Elinor Caplan (born 1944)	Thornhill	June 2, 1997	June 27, 2004	Liberal		Minister of Citizenship and Immigration (1999–2002); Minister of National Revenue (2002–2003)
Aileen Carroll (1944–2020)	Barrie	June 2, 1997	January 22, 2006	Liberal		
Libby Davies (born 1953)	Vancouver East	June 2, 1997	October 18, 2015	NDP		NDP Deputy Leader (2007–2015); First female MP to come out as LGBTQ during her term
Bev Desjarlais (1955–2018)	Churchill	June 2, 1997	January 22, 2006	NDP		
Michelle Dockrill (born 1959)	Cape Breton—Canso	June 2, 1997	November 26, 2000	NDP		
Raymonde Folco (born 1940)	Laval West	June 2, 1997	May 1, 2011	Liberal		
Jocelyne Girard-Bujold (born 1943)	Jonquiere	June 2, 1997	June 27, 2004	Bloc Québécois		
Louise Hardy (born 1959)	Yukon	June 2, 1997	November 26, 2000	NDP		
Marlene Jennings (born 1951)	Notre-Dame-de-Grâce—Lachine	June 2, 1997	May 1, 2011	Liberal		
Nancy Karetak-Lindell (born 1957)	Nunavut	June 2, 1997	October 13, 2008	Liberal		First Inuk woman elected to Parliament
Sophia Leung (born 1933)	Vancouver Kingsway	June 2, 1997	June 27, 2004	Liberal		First Chinese-Canadian woman elected to Parliament
Wendy Lill (born 1950)	Dartmouth—Cole Harbour	June 2, 1997	June 27, 2004	NDP		
Judi Longfield (born 1947)	Whitby—Oshawa	June 2, 1997	January 22, 2006	Liberal		
Alexa McDonough (1944–2022)	Halifax	June 2, 1997	October 13, 2008	NDP		NDP Leader (1995–2003)
Karen Redman (born 1953)	Kitchener Centre	June 2, 1997	October 13, 2008	Liberal		Chief Government Whip (2004–2006)
Caroline St-Hilaire (born 1969)	Longueuil—Pierre-Boucher	June 2, 1997	October 13, 2008	Bloc Québécois		
Diane St-Jacques (born 1953)	Shefford	June 2, 1997	June 27, 2004	Progressive Conservative		
Diane St-Jacques (born 1953)	Shefford	June 2, 1997	June 27, 2004	Liberal		
Yolande Thibeault (born 1953)	Saint-Lambert	June 2, 1997	June 27, 2004	Liberal		
Angela Vautour (born 1953)	Beauséjour—Petitcodiac	June 2, 1997	November 26, 2000	NDP		
Angela Vautour (born 1953)	Beauséjour—Petitcodiac	June 2, 1997	November 26, 2000	Progressive Conservative		
Judy Wasylycia-Leis (born 1951)	Winnipeg North	June 2, 1997	April 30, 2010	NDP		
Judy Sgro (born 1944)	Humber River—Black Creek	November 15, 1999	Incumbent	Liberal		Minister of Citizenship and Immigration (2003–2005)
Carole-Marie Allard (born 1949)	Laval East	November 27, 2000	June 27, 2004	Liberal		
Diane Bourgeois (born 1949)	Terrebonne—Blainville	November 27, 2000	May 1, 2011	Bloc Québécois		
Cheryl Gallant (born 1960)	Renfrew—Nipissing—Pembroke/Algonquin—Renfrew—Pembroke	November 27, 2000	Incumbent	Alliance		
Cheryl Gallant (born 1960)	Renfrew—Nipissing—Pembroke/Algonquin—Renfrew—Pembroke	November 27, 2000	Incumbent	Conservative		
Betty Hinton (born 1950)	Kamloops, Thompson and Highland Valleys	November 27, 2000	October 13, 2008	Alliance		
Betty Hinton (born 1950)	Kamloops—Thompson/ Kamloops—Thompson—Cariboo	November 27, 2000	October 13, 2008	Conservative		
Anita Neville (born 1942)	Winnipeg South Centre	November 27, 2000	May 1, 2011	Liberal		
Helene Scherrer (born 1950)	Louis-Hébert	November 27, 2000	June 27, 2004	Liberal		Minister of Canadian Heritage (2003–2004)
Carol Skelton (born 1945)	Saskatoon—Rosetown—Biggar	November 27, 2000	October 13, 2008	Alliance		Minister of National Revenue (2006–2007); Minister of Western Economic Diversification (2006–2007)
Carol Skelton (born 1945)	Saskatoon—Rosetown—Biggar	November 27, 2000	October 13, 2008	Conservative		Minister of National Revenue (2006–2007); Minister of Western Economic Diversification (2006–2007)
Lynne Yelich (born 1953)	Blackstrap	November 27, 2000	October 18, 2015	Alliance		Minister of Western Economic Diversification (2008–2013); Minister of Consular Affairs (2013–2015)
Lynne Yelich (born 1953)	Blackstrap	November 27, 2000	October 18, 2015	Conservative		Minister of Western Economic Diversification (2008–2013); Minister of Consular Affairs (2013–2015)
Liza Frulla (born 1950)	Jeanne-Le Ber	May 13, 2002	January 22, 2006	Liberal		Minister of Human Resources (2003–2004); Minister of Canadian Heritage (2004–2006); Minister for the Status of Women (2004–2006)
Rona Ambrose (born 1969)	Sturgeon River—Parkland	June 28, 2004	July 4, 2017	Conservative		Minister of the Environment (2006–2007); Minister of Intergovernmental Affairs (2007–2008); Minister of Western Economic Diversification (2007–2008); Minister of Labour (2008–2010); Minister of Public Works (2010–2013); Minister for the Status of Women (2010–2013); Minister of Health (2013–2015)
Françoise Boivin (born 1952)	Gatineau	June 28, 2004	January 22, 2006	Liberal		
Françoise Boivin (born 1952)	Gatineau	May 2, 2011	October 18, 2015	NDP		
France Bonsant (born 1969)	Compton—Stanstead	June 28, 2004	May 1, 2011	Bloc Québécois		
Paule Brunelle (born 1953)	Trois-Rivières	June 28, 2004	May 1, 2011	Bloc Québécois		
Jean Crowder (born 1952)	Nanaimo—Ladysmith	June 28, 2004	October 18, 2015	NDP		
Nicole Demers (born 1950)	Laval	June 28, 2004	May 1, 2011	Bloc Québécois		
Johanne Deschamps (born 1959)	Laurentides—Labelle	June 28, 2004	May 1, 2011	Bloc Québécois		
Ruby Dhalla (born 1974)	Brampton—Springdale	June 28, 2004	May 1, 2011	Liberal		First Indo-Canadian woman elected to Parliament (of 2)
Meili Faille (born 1972)	Vaudreuil—Soulanges	June 28, 2004	May 1, 2011	Bloc Québécois		First Taiwanese-Canadian woman elected to Parliament
Diane Finley (born 1957)	Haldimand—Norfolk	June 28, 2004	May 11, 2021	Conservative		Minister of Human Resources (2006–2007, 2008–2013); Minister of Citizenship and Immigration (2007–2008); Minister of Public Works (2013–2015)
Nina Grewal (born 1958)	Fleetwood—Port Kells	June 28, 2004	October 18, 2015	Conservative		First Indo-Canadian woman elected to Parliament (of 2)
Helena Guergis (born 1969)	Simcoe—Grey	June 28, 2004	May 1, 2011	Conservative		Minister for Sport (2007–2008); Minister for the Status of Women (2008–2010)
Susan Kadis (born 1953)	Thornhill	June 28, 2004	October 13, 2008	Liberal		
Carole Lavallee (1954–2021)	Saint-Bruno—Saint-Hubert	June 28, 2004	May 1, 2011	Bloc Québécois		
Bev Oda (born 1944)	Durham	June 28, 2004	July 31, 2012	Conservative		First Japanese-Canadian woman elected to Parliament; Minister of Canadian Heritage (2006–2007); Minister for the Status of Women (2006–2007); Minister of International Cooperation (2007–2012)
Denise Poirier-Rivard (born 1941)	Chateauguay—Saint-Constant	June 28, 2004	January 22, 2006	Bloc Québécois		
Yasmin Ratansi (born 1951)	Don Valley East	June 28, 2004	May 1, 2011	Liberal		First Tanzanian-Canadian woman and also first Ismaili woman elected to Parliament
Yasmin Ratansi (born 1951)	Don Valley East	October 19, 2015	September 19, 2021	Liberal		First Tanzanian-Canadian woman and also first Ismaili woman elected to Parliament
Yasmin Ratansi (born 1951)	Don Valley East	October 19, 2015	September 19, 2021	Independent		First Tanzanian-Canadian woman and also first Ismaili woman elected to Parliament
Joy Smith (born 1947)	Kildonan—St. Paul	June 28, 2004	October 18, 2015	Conservative		
Belinda Stronach (born 1966)	Newmarket—Aurora	June 28, 2004	October 13, 2008	Conservative		First Austrian-Canadian woman elected to Parliament
Belinda Stronach (born 1966)	Newmarket—Aurora	June 28, 2004	October 13, 2008	Liberal		First Austrian-Canadian woman elected to Parliament
Louise Thibault (born 1947)	Rimouski-Neigette—Témiscouata—Les Basques	June 28, 2004	October 13, 2008	Bloc Québécois		
Vivian Barbot (born 1947)	Papineau	January 23, 2006	October 13, 2008	Bloc Québécois		First Haitian-Canadian woman elected to Parliament; BQ Leader (2011)
Catherine Bell (born 1954)	Vancouver Island North	January 23, 2006	October 13, 2008	NDP		
Sylvie Boucher (born 1962)	Beauport—Limoilou	January 23, 2006	May 1, 2011	Conservative		
Sylvie Boucher (born 1962)	Beauport—Côte-de-Beaupré—Île d'Orléans—Charlevoix	October 19, 2015	October 20, 2019	Conservative		
Chris Charlton (born 1963)	Hamilton Mountain	January 23, 2006	October 18, 2015	NDP		First German-Canadian woman elected to Parliament
Olivia Chow (born 1957)	Trinity—Spadina	January 23, 2006	March 12, 2014	NDP		
Pat Davidson (born 1946)	Sarnia—Lambton	January 23, 2006	October 18, 2015	Conservative		
Claude DeBellefeuille (born 1963)	Beauharnois—Salaberry	January 23, 2006	May 1, 2011	Bloc Québécois		BQ Whip (2010–2011)
Claude DeBellefeuille (born 1963)	Salaberry—Suroît	October 21, 2019		Bloc Québécois		BQ Whip (2010–2011)
Carole Freeman (born 1949)	Chateauguay—Saint-Constant	January 23, 2006	May 1, 2011	Bloc Québécois		BQ Whip (2010–2011)
Tina Keeper (born 1962)	Churchill	January 23, 2006	October 13, 2008	Liberal		
Irene Mathyssen (born 1951)	London—Fanshawe	January 23, 2006	October 20, 2019	NDP		
Maria Mourani (born 1969)	Ahuntsic	January 23, 2006	October 18, 2015	Bloc Québécois		First Lebanese-Canadian woman elected to Parliament
Maria Mourani (born 1969)	Ahuntsic	January 23, 2006	October 18, 2015	Independent		First Lebanese-Canadian woman elected to Parliament
Peggy Nash (born 1951)	Parkdale—High Park	January 23, 2006	October 13, 2008	NDP		
Peggy Nash (born 1951)	Parkdale—High Park	May 2, 2011	October 18, 2015	NDP		
Penny Priddy (born 1944)	Surrey North	January 23, 2006	October 13, 2008	NDP		
Denise Savoie (born 1943)	Victoria	January 23, 2006	September 17, 2012	NDP		Deputy Speaker (2011–2012)
Josée Verner (born 1959)	Louis-Saint-Laurent	January 23, 2006	May 1, 2011	Conservative		Minister of International Cooperation (2006–2007); Minister of Canadian Heritage (2007–2008); Minister for the Status of Women (2007–2008); Minister of Intergovernmental Affairs (2008–2011)
Ève-Mary Thaï Thi Lac (born 1972)	Saint-Hyacinthe—Bagot	January 23, 2006	May 1, 2011	Bloc Québécois		First Vietnamese-Canadian woman elected to Parliament
Martha Hall Findlay (born 1959)	Willowdale	March 17, 2008	May 1, 2011	Liberal		
Joyce Murray (born 1954)	Vancouver Quadra	March 17, 2008	April 27, 2025	Liberal		First South African-Canadian woman elected to Parliament; President of the Treasury Board (2019); Minister of Digital Government (2019–2021); Minister of Fisheries, Oceans and the Canadian Coast Guard (2021–2023)
Leona Aglukkaq (born 1967)	Nunavut	October 14, 2008	October 18, 2015	Conservative		Minister of Health (2008–2013); Minister of the Environment (2013–2015)
Niki Ashton (born 1982)	Churchill	October 14, 2008	April 27, 2025	NDP		
Josée Beaudin (born 1961)	Saint-Lambert	October 14, 2008	May 1, 2011	Bloc Québécois		
Candice Bergen (born 1964)	Portage—Lisgar	October 14, 2008	February 28, 2023	Conservative		Minister of Social Development (2013–2015); Official Opposition House Leader (2016–2020)
Kelly Block (born 1961)	Carlton Trail—Eagle Creek	October 14, 2008	Incumbent	Conservative		
Lois Brown (born 1955)	Newmarket—Aurora	October 14, 2008	October 18, 2015	Conservative		
Dona Cadman (born 1950)	Surrey North	October 14, 2008	May 1, 2011	Conservative		
Siobhan Coady (born 1960)	St. John's South—Mount Pearl	October 14, 2008	May 1, 2011	Liberal		
Bonnie Crombie (born 1960)	Mississauga—Streetsville	October 14, 2008	May 1, 2011	Liberal		First Polish-Canadian woman elected to Parliament
Kirsty Duncan (1966–2026)	Etobicoke North	October 14, 2008	April 27, 2025	Liberal		Minister for Science (2015–2019); Minister of Sport and Persons with Disabilities (2018); Deputy House Leader of the Government (2019–2021)
Linda Duncan (born 1949)	Edmonton—Strathcona	October 14, 2008	October 20, 2019	NDP		
Judy Foote (born 1952)	Bonavista—Burin—Trinity	October 14, 2008	September 30, 2017	Liberal		Minister of Public Services and Procurement; Receiver General (2015–2017)
Shelly Glover (born 1967)	Saint Boniface	October 14, 2008	October 18, 2015	Conservative		First Métis woman elected to Parliament; Minister of Canadian Heritage (2013–2015)
Carol Hughes (born 1958)	Algoma—Manitoulin—Kapuskasing	October 14, 2008	April 27, 2025	NDP		
Megan Leslie (born 1973)	Halifax	October 14, 2008	October 18, 2015	NDP		Deputy NDP Leader (2012–2015)
Cathy McLeod (born 1957)	Kamloops—Thompson—Cariboo	October 14, 2008	September 19, 2021	Conservative		
Alexandra Mendès (born 1963)	Brossard—La Prairie	October 14, 2008	May 1, 2011	Liberal		First Portuguese-Canadian woman elected to Parliament
Alexandra Mendès (born 1963)	Brossard—Saint-Lambert	October 19, 2015	Incumbent	Liberal		First Portuguese-Canadian woman elected to Parliament
Tilly O'Neill-Gordon (born 1949)	Miramichi	October 14, 2008	October 18, 2015	Conservative		
Lisa Raitt (born 1968)	Milton	October 14, 2008	October 20, 2019	Conservative		Minister of Natural Resources (2008–2010); Minister of Labour (2010–2013); Minister of Transport (2013–2015)
Gail Shea (born 1959)	Egmont	October 14, 2008	October 18, 2015	Conservative		Minister of Fisheries and Oceans (2008–2011, 2013–2015); Minister of National Revenue (2011–2013)
Michelle Simson (born 1953)	Scarborough Southwest	October 14, 2008	May 1, 2011	Liberal		
Alice Wong (born 1948)	Richmond Centre	October 14, 2008	September 19, 2021	Conservative		Minister for Seniors (2011–2015)
Lise Zarac (born 1950)	LaSalle—Emard	October 14, 2008	May 1, 2011	Liberal		

=== First elected since 2011 ===
Member of Parliament	Riding	Took office	Left office	Party	Ref.	Note
Eve Adams (born 1974)	Mississauga—Brampton South	May 2, 2011	October 18, 2015	Conservative		First Hungarian-Canadian woman elected to Parliament
Eve Adams (born 1974)	Mississauga—Brampton South	May 2, 2011	October 18, 2015	Liberal		First Hungarian-Canadian woman elected to Parliament
Stella Ambler (born 1966)	Mississauga South	May 2, 2011	October 18, 2015	Conservative		
Paulina Ayala (born 1962)	Honoré-Mercier	May 2, 2011	October 18, 2015	NDP		First Chilean-Canadian woman elected to Parliament
Joyce Bateman (born 1957)	Winnipeg South Centre	May 2, 2011	October 18, 2015	Conservative		
Lysane Blanchette-Lamothe (born 1984)	Pierrefonds—Dollard	May 2, 2011	October 18, 2015	NDP		
Charmaine Borg (born 1990)	Terrebonne—Blainville	May 2, 2011	October 18, 2015	NDP		First Maltese-Canadian woman elected to Parliament
Marjolaine Boutin-Sweet (born 1955)	Hochelaga	May 2, 2011	October 20, 2019	NDP		
Ruth Ellen Brosseau (born 1984)	Berthier—Maskinongé	May 2, 2011	October 20, 2019	NDP		
Anne-Marie Day (born 1954)	Charlesbourg—Haute-Saint-Charles	May 2, 2011	October 18, 2015	NDP		
Rosane Doré Lefebvre (born 1984)	Alfred-Pellan	May 2, 2011	October 18, 2015	NDP		
Kerry-Lynne Findlay (born 1955)	Delta—Richmond East	May 2, 2011	October 18, 2015	Conservative		Minister of National Revenue (2013–2015)
Kerry-Lynne Findlay (born 1955)	South Surrey—White Rock	October 21, 2019	April 27, 2025	Conservative		Minister of National Revenue (2013–2015)
Sadia Groguhé (born 1962)	Saint-Lambert	May 2, 2011	October 18, 2015	NDP		
Sana Hassainia (born 1974)	Verchères—Les Patriotes	May 2, 2011	October 18, 2015	NDP		
Sana Hassainia (born 1974)	Verchères—Les Patriotes	May 2, 2011	October 18, 2015	Independent		
Roxanne James (born 1966)	Scarborough Centre	May 2, 2011	October 18, 2015	Conservative		
Alexandrine Latendresse (born 1984)	Louis-Saint-Laurent	May 2, 2011	October 18, 2015	NDP		
Hélène Laverdière (born 1955)	Laurier—Sainte-Marie	May 2, 2011	October 20, 2019	NDP		
Hélène LeBlanc (born 1958)	LaSalle—Émard	May 2, 2011	October 18, 2015	NDP		
Kellie Leitch (born 1970)	Simcoe—Grey	May 2, 2011	October 20, 2019	Conservative		Minister of Labour/for the Status of Women (2013–2015)
Laurin Liu (born 1990)	Rivière-des-Mille-Îles	May 2, 2011	October 18, 2015	NDP		Youngest woman elected to Parliament
Elizabeth May (born 1954)	Saanich—Gulf Islands	May 2, 2011	Incumbent	Green		First-ever Green MP and also first Green woman elected to Parliament
Christine Moore (born 1955)	Abitibi—Témiscamingue	May 2, 2011	October 20, 2019	NDP		
Isabelle Morin (born 1985)	Notre-Dame-de-Grâce—Lachine	May 2, 2011	October 18, 2015	NDP		
Marie-Claude Morin (born 1985)	Saint-Hyacinthe—Bagot	May 2, 2011	October 18, 2015	NDP		
Ève Péclet (born 1988)	La Pointe-de-l'Île	May 2, 2011	October 18, 2015	NDP		
Manon Perreault (born 1965)	Montcalm	May 2, 2011	October 18, 2015	NDP		First woman with disability in Parliament and also first female wheelchair user elected to the House of Commons
Manon Perreault (born 1965)	Montcalm	May 2, 2011	October 18, 2015	Independent		First woman with disability in Parliament and also first female wheelchair user elected to the House of Commons
Annick Papillon (born 1980)	Québec	May 2, 2011	October 18, 2015	NDP		
Anne Minh-Thu Quach (born 1982)	Beauharnois—Salaberry	May 2, 2011	October 18, 2015	NDP		
Anne Minh-Thu Quach (born 1982)	Salaberry—Suroît	October 19, 2015	October 20, 2019	NDP		
Francine Raynault (born 1945)	Joliette	May 2, 2011	October 18, 2015	NDP		
Michelle Rempel Garner (born 1980)	Calgary Centre-North	May 2, 2011	October 18, 2015	Conservative		Minister of Western Economic Diversification (2013–2015)
Michelle Rempel Garner (born 1980)	Calgary Nose Hill	October 19, 2015		Conservative		Minister of Western Economic Diversification (2013–2015)
Lise St-Denis (born 1940)	Saint-Maurice—Champlain	May 2, 2011	October 18, 2015	NDP		Oldest woman elected to Parliament
Lise St-Denis (born 1940)	Saint-Maurice—Champlain	May 2, 2011	October 18, 2015	Liberal		Oldest woman elected to Parliament
Djaouida Sellah (born 19?)	Saint-Bruno—Saint-Hubert	May 2, 2011	October 18, 2015	NDP		
Jinny Sims (born 1952)	Newton—North Delta	May 2, 2011	October 18, 2015	NDP		
Rathika Sitsabaiesan (born 1981)	Scarborough—Rouge River	May 2, 2011	October 18, 2015	NDP		First Sri Lankan-Canadian woman elected to Parliament
Susan Truppe (born 1959)	London North Centre	May 2, 2011	October 18, 2015	Conservative		
Nycole Turmel (born 1942)	Hull—Aylmer	May 2, 2011	October 18, 2015	NDP		Interim NDP Leader and Leader of the Official Opposition (2011–2012)
Wai Young (born 1960)	Vancouver South	May 2, 2011	October 18, 2015	Conservative		
Joan Crockatt (born 1955)	Calgary Centre	November 26, 2012	October 18, 2015	Conservative		
Yvonne Jones (born 1968)	Labrador	May 13, 2013	April 27, 2025	Liberal		
Chrystia Freeland (born 1968)	Toronto Centre	November 24, 2013	October 18, 2015	Liberal		Minister of International Trade (2015–2017); Minister of Foreign Affairs (2017–2019); Minister of Intergovernmental Affairs (2019–2020); Deputy Prime Minister (2019–2024); Minister of Finance (2020–2024); Minister of Transport and Internal Trade (2025)
Chrystia Freeland (born 1968)	University—Rosedale	October 19, 2015	January 9, 2026	Liberal		Minister of International Trade (2015–2017); Minister of Foreign Affairs (2017–2019); Minister of Intergovernmental Affairs (2019–2020); Deputy Prime Minister (2019–2024); Minister of Finance (2020–2024); Minister of Transport and Internal Trade (2025)
Pat Perkins (born 1953)	Whitby—Oshawa	November 17, 2014	October 18, 2015	Conservative		
Leona Alleslev (born 1968)	Aurora—Oak Ridges—Richmond Hill	October 19, 2015	September 19, 2021	Liberal		Conservative Deputy Leader (2019–2020)
Leona Alleslev (born 1968)	Aurora—Oak Ridges—Richmond Hill	October 19, 2015	September 19, 2021	Conservative		Conservative Deputy Leader (2019–2020)
Sheri Benson (born 1962/63)	Saskatoon West	October 19, 2015	October 20, 2019	NDP		
Marie-Claude Bibeau (born 1970)	Compton—Stanstead	October 19, 2015	April 27, 2025	Liberal		Minister of International Development (2015–2019); Minister for La Francophone (2015–2018); Minister of Agriculture and Agri-Food (2019–2023); Minister of National Revenue (2023–2024)
Rachel Blaney (born 1974)	North Island—Powell River	October 19, 2015	April 27, 2025	NDP		
Celina Caesar-Chavannes (born 1974)	Whitby	October 19, 2015	October 20, 2019	Liberal		
Celina Caesar-Chavannes (born 1974)	Whitby	October 19, 2015	October 20, 2019	Independent		
Bardish Chagger (born 1980)	Waterloo	October 19, 2015		Liberal		Minister of Diversity, Inclusion and Youth (2019–2021); Minister of Small Business and Tourism (2015–2018)
Julie Dabrusin (born 1971)	Toronto—Danforth	October 19, 2015		Liberal		
Pam Damoff (born 1971)	Oakville North—Burlington	October 19, 2015	April 27, 2025	Liberal		
Anju Dhillon (born 1979)	Dorval—Lachine—LaSalle	October 19, 2015		Liberal		
Julie Dzerowicz (born 1979)	Davenport	October 19, 2015		Liberal		
Marilène Gill (born 1977)	Manicouagan/Côte-Nord—Kawawachikamach—Nitassinan	October 19, 2015		Bloc Québécois		
Marilyn Gladu (born 1962)	Sarnia—Lambton/Sarnia—Lambton—Bkejwanong	October 19, 2015		Conservative		
Marilyn Gladu (born 1962)	Sarnia—Lambton/Sarnia—Lambton—Bkejwanong	October 19, 2015		Liberal		
Pamela Goldsmith-Jones (born 1961)	West Vancouver—Sunshine Coast—Sea to Sky Country	October 19, 2015	October 20, 2019	Liberal		
Karina Gould (born 1987)	Burlington	October 19, 2015		Liberal		President of the Queen's Privy Council for Canada (2017–2018); Minister of Democratic Institutions (2017–2019); Minister of International Development (2019–2021); Minister of Families, Children and Social Development (2021–2023); House Leader of the Government (2023–Jan. 2024; July 2024–2025)
Patty Hajdu (born 1966)	Thunder Bay—Superior North	October 19, 2015		Liberal		Minister for the Status of Women (2015–2017); Minister of Employment, Workforce and Labour (2017–2019); Minister of Health (2019–2021); Minister of Indigenous Services (2021–2025); Minister responsible for the Federal Economic Development Initiative for Northern Ontario (2021–present)
Cheryl Hardcastle (born 1961)	Windsor—Tecumseh	October 19, 2015	October 20, 2019	NDP		
Gudie Hutchings (born 1959)	Long Range Mountains	October 19, 2015	April 27, 2025	Liberal		Minister of Rural Economic Development (2021–2025)
Georgina Jolibois (born 1968)	Desnethé—Missinippi—Churchill River	October 19, 2015	October 20, 2019	NDP		
Mélanie Joly (born 1979)	Ahuntsic—Cartierville	October 19, 2015		Liberal		Minister of Canadian Heritage (2015–2018); Minister of Tourism, Official Languages and La Francophonie (2018–2019); Minister of Economic Development/Official Languages (2019–2021); Minister of Foreign Affairs/International Development (2021–2025); Minister of Industry (2025–present)
Bernadette Jordan (born 1963)	South Shore—St. Margaret's	October 19, 2015	September 19, 2021	Liberal		Minister of Rural Economic Development (2019); Minister of Fisheries, Oceans and the Canadian Coast Guard (2019–2021)
Iqra Khalid (born 1986)	Mississauga—Erin Mills	October 19, 2015		Liberal		
Kamal Khera (born 1989)	Brampton West	October 19, 2015	April 27, 2025	Liberal		Minister for Seniors (2021–2023); Minister of Diversity, Inclusion and Persons with Disabilities (2023–2025); Minister of Health (2025)
Jenny Kwan (born 1967)	Vancouver East	October 19, 2015		NDP		
Linda Lapointe (born 1960)	Rivière-des-Mille-Îles	October 19, 2015	October 20, 2019	Liberal		
Linda Lapointe (born 1960)	Rivière-des-Mille-Îles	April 28, 2025		Liberal		
Diane Lebouthillier (born 1959)	Gaspésie—Les Îles-de-la-Madeleine	October 19, 2015	April 27, 2025	Liberal		Minister of National Revenue (2015–2023); Minister of Fisheries, Oceans and the Canadian Coast Guard (2023–2025)
Alaina Lockhart (born 1974)	Fundy Royal	October 19, 2015	October 20, 2019	Liberal		
Karen Ludwig (born 1964)	New Brunswick Southwest	October 19, 2015	October 20, 2019	Liberal		
Sheila Malcolmson (born 1966)	Nanaimo—Ladysmith	October 19, 2015	January 2, 2019	NDP		
Karen McCrimmon (born 1959)	Kanata—Carleton	October 19, 2015	September 19, 2021	Liberal		
MaryAnn Mihychuk (born 1979)	Kildonan—St. Paul	October 19, 2015	October 20, 2019	Liberal		Minister of Employment, Workforce and Labour (2015–2017)
Catherine McKenna (born 1971)	Ottawa Centre	October 19, 2015	September 19, 2021	Liberal		Minister of Environment and Climate Change (2015–2019); Minister of Infrastructure and Communities (2019–2021)
Maryam Monsef (born 1984)	Peterborough—Kawartha	October 19, 2015	September 19, 2021	Liberal		First Afghan-Canadian women elected to Parliament; President of the Queen's Privy Council for Canada; Minister of Democratic Institutions (2015–2017); Minister of International Development (2019); Minister for the Status of Women/Women and Gender Equality (2017–2021); Minister of Rural Economic Development (2019–2021)
Eva Nassif (born 19?)	Vimy	October 19, 2015	October 20, 2019	Liberal		
Jennifer O'Connell (born 1983)	Pickering—Uxbridge	October 19, 2015	April 27, 2025	Liberal		
Monique Pauzé (born 1950)	Repentigny	October 19, 2015	April 27, 2025	Bloc Québécois		Groupe parlementaire québécois/Québec debout MP (2018)
Ginette Petitpas Taylor (born 1968/69)	Moncton–Riverview–Dieppe/Moncton—Dieppe	October 19, 2015		Liberal		Minister of Health (2017–2019); Minister of Official Languages (2021–2023); Minister of Veterans Affairs; Associate Minister of National Defence (2023–2024); President of the Treasury Board (2024–2025)
Jane Philpott (born 1960)	Markham—Stouffville	October 19, 2015	October 20, 2019	Liberal		Minister of Health (2015–2017); Minister of Indigenous Services (2017–2019); President of the Treasury Board (2019)
Jane Philpott (born 1960)	Markham—Stouffville	October 19, 2015	October 20, 2019	Independent		Minister of Health (2015–2017); Minister of Indigenous Services (2017–2019); President of the Treasury Board (2019)
Carla Qualtrough (born 1971)	Delta	October 19, 2015	April 27, 2025	Liberal		First former Paralympian elected to Parliament; Minister of Sport and Persons with Disabilities (2015–2017); Minister of Public Services and Procurement/Public Services and Procurement, and Accessibility; Receiver General (2017–2019); Minister of Employment, Workforce Development and Disability Inclusion (2019–2023); Minister of Sport and Physical Activity (2023–2024)
Tracey Ramsey (born 1971)	Essex	October 19, 2015	October 20, 2019	NDP		
Sherry Romanado (born 1974)	Longueuil—Charles-LeMoyne	October 19, 2015		Liberal		Deputy House Leader of the Government (2022–2023)
Kim Rudd (1957–2024)	Northumberland—Peterborough South	October 19, 2015	October 20, 2019	Liberal		
Ruby Sahota (born 1979)	Brampton North/Brampton North—Caledon	October 19, 2015		Liberal		Minister of Democratic Institutions/responsible for the Federal Economic Development Agency for Southern Ontario (2024–2025)
Brigitte Sansoucy (born 1963)	Saint-Hyacinthe—Bagot	October 19, 2015	October 20, 2019	NDP		
Deb Schulte (born 1960)	King—Vaughan	October 19, 2015	September 19, 2021	Liberal		Minister for Seniors (2019–2021)
Brenda Shanahan (born 1958)	Châteauguay—Lacolle	October 19, 2015	April 27, 2025	Liberal		
Sonia Sidhu (born 1968)	Brampton South	October 19, 2015		Liberal		
Shannon Stubbs (born 1979)	Lakeland	October 19, 2015		Conservative		
Filomena Tassi (born 1962)	Hamilton West—Ancaster—Dundas	October 19, 2015	April 27, 2025	Liberal		Minister for Seniors (2018–2019); Minister of Labour (2019–2021); Minister of Public Services and Procurement; Receiver General; Minister for Canada Post Corp. (2021–2022); Minister responsible for the Federal Economic Development Agency for Southern Ontario (2022–2024)
Rachael Thomas (born 1986)	Lethbridge	October 19, 2015		Conservative		
Karine Trudel (born 19?)	Jonquière	October 19, 2015	October 20, 2019	NDP		
Anita Vandenbeld (born 1971)	Ottawa West—Nepean	October 19, 2015		Liberal		
Karen Vecchio (born 1971)	Elgin—Middlesex—London	October 19, 2015	April 27, 2025	Conservative		
Cathay Wagantall (born 1956)	Yorkton—Melville	October 19, 2015	August 31, 2026	Conservative		
Dianne Watts (born 1959)	South Surrey—White Rock	October 19, 2015	September 30, 2017	Conservative		
Jody Wilson-Raybould (born 1971)	Vancouver Granville	October 19, 2015	September 19, 2021	Liberal		Minister of Justice and Attorney General (2015–2019); Minister of Veterans Affairs (2019)
Jody Wilson-Raybould (born 1971)	Vancouver Granville	October 19, 2015	September 19, 2021	Independent		Minister of Justice and Attorney General (2015–2019); Minister of Veterans Affairs (2019)
Kate Young (born 1955)	London West	October 19, 2015	September 19, 2021	Liberal		
Salma Zahid (born 1970)	Scarborough Centre/Scarborough Centre—Don Valley East	October 19, 2015		Liberal		
Mona Fortier (born 1972)	Ottawa—Vanier	April 3, 2017		Liberal		Minister of Middle Class Prosperity; Associate Minister of Finance (2019–2021); President of the Treasury Board (2021–2023)
Stephanie Kusie (born 1973)	Calgary Midnapore	April 3, 2017		Conservative		
Emmanuella Lambropoulos (born 1990)	Saint-Laurent	April 3, 2017		Liberal		
Mary Ng (born 1973)	Markham-Thornhill	April 3, 2017	April 27, 2025	Liberal		Minister of Small Business and Export Promotion/Small Business, Export Promotion and International Trade/International Trade, Export Promotion, Small Business and Economic Development (2018–2025)
Rosemarie Falk (born 1988)	Battlefords—Lloydminster/Battlefords—Lloydminster—Meadow Lake	December 11, 2017		Conservative		
Jean Yip (born 1968)	Scarborough—Agincourt	December 11, 2017		Liberal		
Rachel Bendayan (born 1980)	Outremont	February 25, 2019		Liberal		Minister of Official Languages; Associate Minister of Public Safety (2024–2025); MInister of Immigration, Refugees and Citizenship (2025)
Anita Anand (born 1967)	Oakville/Oakville East	October 21, 2019		Liberal		Minister of Public Services and Procurement; Receiver General (2019–2021); Minister of National Defence (2021–2023); President of the Treasury Board (2023–2024); Minister of Transport/Internal Trade (2024–2025} Minister of Innovation, Science and Industry (2025); Minister of Foreign Affairs (2025–present)
Jenica Atwin (born 1987)	Fredericton	October 21, 2019	April 27, 2025	Green		Only female MP to cross the floor from the Greens
Jenica Atwin (born 1987)	Fredericton	October 21, 2019	April 27, 2025	Liberal		Only female MP to cross the floor from the Greens
Sylvie Bérubé (born 19?)	Abitibi—Baie-James—Nunavik—Eeyou	October 21, 2019	April 27, 2025	Bloc Québécois		
Lyne Bessette (born 1975)	Brome—Mississquoi	October 21, 2019	September 19, 2021	Liberal		
Élisabeth Brière (born 1968)	Sherbrooke	October 21, 2019		Liberal		Minister of National Revenue (2024–2025); Minister of Veterans Affairs/responsible for the Canada Revenue Agency (2025)
Louise Chabot (born 1955)	Thérèse-De Blainville	October 21, 2019	April 27, 2025	Bloc Québécois		
Louise Charbonneau (born 19?)	Trois-Rivières	October 21, 2019	September 19, 2021	Bloc Québécois		
Laurel Collins (born 1984)	Victoria	October 21, 2019	April 27, 2025	NDP		
Raquel Dancho (born 1990)	Kildonan—St. Paul	October 21, 2019		Conservative		
Caroline Desbiens (born 19?)	Beauport—Côte-de-Beaupré—Île d'Orléans—Charlevoix	October 21, 2019	April 27, 2025	Bloc Québécois		
Marie-Hélène Gaudreau (born 1977)	Laurentides—Labelle	October 21, 2019		Bloc Québécois		
Leah Gazan (born 1972)	Winnipeg Centre	October 21, 2019		NDP		
Tracy Gray (born 19?)	Kelowna—Lake Country	October 21, 2019	April 27, 2025	Conservative		
Helena Jaczek (born 1950)	Markham—Stouffville	October 21, 2019		Liberal		Minister of Public Services and Procurement; Receiver General (2022–2023); Minister responsible for the Federal Economic Development Agency for Southern Ontario (2021–2022)
Tamara Jansen (born 1967/68)	Cloverdale—Langley City	October 21, 2019	September 19, 2021	Conservative		
Tamara Jansen (born 1967/68)	Cloverdale—Langley City	December 16, 2024		Conservative		
Annie Koutrakis (born 1960)	Vimy	October 21, 2019		Liberal		
Marie-France Lalonde (born 1971)	Orléans	October 21, 2019		Liberal		
Andréanne Larouche (born 19?)	Shefford	October 21, 2019		Bloc Québécois		
Patricia Lattanzio (born 19?)	Saint-Léonard—Saint-Michel	October 21, 2019		Liberal		
Soraya Martinez Ferrada (born 1972)	Hochelaga	October 21, 2019	April 27, 2025	Liberal		Minister of Tourism/responsible for the Economic Development Agency of Canada for the Regions of Quebec (2023–2025)
Lindsay Mathyssen (born 19?)	London—Fanshawe	October 21, 2019	April 27, 2025	NDP		
Heather McPherson (born 1972)	Edmonton—Strathcona	October 21, 2019		NDP		
Kristina Michaud (born 1993)	Avignon—La Mitis—Matane—Matapédia	October 21, 2019	April 27, 2025	Bloc Québécois		
Christine Normandin (born 1984)	Saint-Jean	October 21, 2019		Bloc Québécois		
Mumilaaq Qaqqaq (born 1993)	Nunavut	October 21, 2019	September 19, 2021	NDP		
Lianne Rood (born 1979)	Lambton—Kent—Middlesex/Middlesex—London	October 21, 2019		Conservative		
Jag Sahota (born 1978)	Calgary Skyview	October 21, 2019	September 19, 2021	Conservative		
Nelly Shin (born 1972)	Port Moody—Coquitlam	October 21, 2019	September 19, 2021	Conservative		First Korean-Canadian woman elected to Parliament
Julie Vignola (born 19?)	Beauport—Limoilou	October 21, 2019	April 27, 2025	Bloc Québécois		
Lenore Zann (born 1959)	Cumberland—Colchester	October 21, 2019	September 19, 2021	Liberal		
Marci Ien (born 1969)	Toronto Centre	October 26, 2020	April 27, 2025	Liberal		Minister for Women and Gender Equality and Youth (2021–2025)
Ya'ara Saks (born 1973)	York Centre	October 26, 2020	April 27, 2025	Liberal		First Israeli-Canadian woman elected to Parliament; Minister of Mental Health and Addictions; Associate Minister of Health (2023–2025)
Lisa Marie Barron (born 19?)	Nanaimo—Ladysmith	September 20, 2021	April 27, 2025	NDP		
Valerie Bradford (born 1953)	Kitchener South—Hespeler	September 20, 2021	April 27, 2025	Liberal		
Sophie Chatel (born 19?)	Pontiac	September 20, 2021		Liberal		
Lena Diab (born 1965)	Halifax Armdale	September 20, 2021		Liberal		
Michelle Ferreri (born 19?)	Peterborough—Kawartha	September 20, 2021	April 27, 2025	Conservative		
Laila Goodridge (born 1986/87)	Fort McMurray—Cold Lake	September 20, 2021		Conservative		
Lisa Hepfner (born 1971)	Hamilton Mountain	September 20, 2021		Liberal		
Lori Idlout (born 1974)	Nunavut	September 20, 2021		NDP		
Lori Idlout (born 1974)	Nunavut	September 20, 2021		Liberal		
Arielle Kayabaga (born 1990/91)	London West	September 20, 2021		Liberal		Deputy House Leader of the Government (2025–present)
Shelby Kramp-Neuman (born 1978)	Hastings—Lennox and Addington	September 20, 2021		Conservative		
Melissa Lantsman (born 1984)	Thornhill	September 20, 2021		Conservative		First LGBTQ Jewish woman elected to Parliament
Viviane Lapointe (born 19?)	Sudbury	September 20, 2021		Liberal		
Leslyn Lewis (born 1970)	Haldimand—Norfolk	September 20, 2021		Conservative		
Anna Roberts (born 1957)	King—Vaughan	September 20, 2021		Conservative		
Nathalie Sinclair-Desgagné (born 1987/88)	Terrebonne	September 20, 2021	April 27, 2025	Bloc Québécois		
Jenna Sudds (born 1979)	Kanata—Carleton	September 20, 2021		Liberal		
Pascale St-Onge (born 1977)	Brome—Mississquoi	September 20, 2021	April 27, 2025	Liberal		First LGBTQ female cabinet minister Minister of Tourism (2025); Minister of Canadian Heritage (2023–2025); Minister for Sport (2021–2023); Minister responsible for the Economic Development Agency of Canada for the Regions of Quebec (2021–2023, 2025)
Leah Taylor Roy (born 1960/61)	Aurora—Oak Ridges—Richmond Hill	September 20, 2021		Liberal		
Joanne Thompson (born 1960)	St. John's East	September 20, 2021		Liberal		Minister of Seniors (2024–2025); Minister of Fisheries, Oceans and the Canadian Coast Guard/Fisheries (2025–present)
Rechie Valdez (born 1980)	Mississauga—Streetsville	September 20, 2021		Liberal		First Filipino-Canadian woman elected to Parliament; Minister of Small Business (2023–2025); Chief Government Whip (2025); Minister of Women and Gender Equality (2025–present)
Dominique Vien (born 1967)	Bellechasse—Les Etchemins—Lévis	September 20, 2021		Conservative		
Bonita Zarrillo (born 1965/66)	Port Moody—Coquitlam	September 20, 2021	April 27, 2025	NDP		
Anna Gainey (born 1978)	Notre-Dame-de-Grâce—Westmount	June 19, 2023		Liberal		President of the Liberal Party (2014–2018)
Leila Dance (born 1977/78)	Elmwood—Transcona	September 17, 2024	April 27, 2025	NDP		Shortest-serving female MP
Sima Acan (born 1979)	Oakville West	April 28, 2025		Liberal		First Turkish-Canadian woman elected to Parliament
Rebecca Alty (born 19?)	Northwest Territories	April 28, 2025		Liberal		Minister of Crown–Indigenous Relations (2025–present); first full cabinet minister with a portfolio ever from that territory
Carol Anstey (born 1974)	Long Range Mountains	April 28, 2025		Conservative		
Tatiana Auguste (born 2001)	Terrebonne	April 28, 2025	February 13, 2026	Liberal		First female MP born in the 21st century (of 2); also first woman unseated by election annulment and then re-elected to fill her vacancy
Tatiana Auguste (born 2001)	Terrebonne	April 13, 2026		Liberal		First female MP born in the 21st century (of 2); also first woman unseated by election annulment and then re-elected to fill her vacancy
Kathy Borrelli (born 19?)	Windsor—Tecumseh—Lakeshore	April 28, 2025		Conservative		
Rebecca Chartrand (born 19?)	Churchill—Keewatinook Aski	April 28, 2025		Liberal		Minister of Northern and Arctic Affairs/responsible for the Canadian Northern Economic Development Agency (2025–present)
Madeleine Chenette (born 19?)	Thérèse-De Blainville	April 28, 2025		Liberal		
Maggie Chi (born 19?)	Don Valley North	April 28, 2025		Liberal		
Leslie Church (born 19?)	Toronto—St. Paul's	April 28, 2025		Liberal		
Sandra Cobena (born 19?)	Newmarket—Aurora	April 28, 2025		Conservative		First Ecuadorian-Canadian woman elected to Parliament
Connie Cody (born 19?)	Cambridge	April 28, 2025		Conservative		
Kelly DeRidder (born 19?)	Kitchener Centre	April 28, 2025		Conservative		
Caroline Desrochers (born 19?)	Trois-Rivières	April 28, 2025		Liberal		
Jessica Fancy-Landry (born 1983/84)	South Shore—St. Margarets	April 28, 2025		Liberal		
Mandy Gull-Masty (born 1980)	Abitibi—Baie-James—Nunavik—Eeyou	April 28, 2025		Liberal		Minister of Indigenous Services (2025–present); first Indigenous woman in that role
Emma Harrison (born 19?)	Peterborough	April 28, 2025		Liberal		
Alana Hirtle (born 1968/69)	Cumberland—Colchester	April 28, 2025		Liberal		
Rhonda Kirkland (born 19?)	Oshawa	April 28, 2025		Conservative		
Helena Konanz (born 1961)	Similkameen—South Okanagan—West Kootenay	April 28, 2025		Conservative		
Tamara Kronis (born 1974)	Nanaimo—Ladysmith	April 28, 2025		Conservative		
Ginette Lavack (born 19?)	St. Boniface—St. Vital	April 28, 2025		Liberal		
Jennifer McKelvie (born 1977)	Ajax	April 28, 2025		Liberal		
Jill McKnight (born 1979)	Delta	April 28, 2025		Liberal		Minister of Veterans Affairs; Associate Minister of National Defence (2025–present)
Stephanie McLean (born 19?)	Esquimalt—Saanich—Sooke	April 28, 2025		Liberal		
Marie-Gabrielle Ménard (born 19?)	Hochelaga—Rosemont-Est	April 28, 2025		Liberal		
Marjorie Michel (born 19?)	Papineau	April 28, 2025		Liberal		Minister of Health (2025–present); daughter of former Haitian prime minister Smarck Michel
Shannon Miedema (born 1979/80)	Halifax	April 28, 2025		Liberal		
Giovanna Mingarelli (born 19?)	Prescott—Russell—Cumberland	April 28, 2025		Liberal		
Juanita Nathan (born 19?)	Pickering—Brooklin	April 28, 2025		Liberal		
Chi Nguyen (born 19?)	Spadina—Harbourfront	April 28, 2025		Liberal		
Dominique O'Rourke (born 19?)	Guelph	April 28, 2025		Liberal		
Eleanor Olszewski (born 1954/55)	Edmonton Centre	April 28, 2025		Liberal		Minister of Emergency Management and Community Resilience/responsible for Prairies Economic Development Canada (2025–present)
Nathalie Provost (born 1965/66)	Châteauguay—Les Jardins-de-Napierville	April 28, 2025		Liberal		
Pauline Rochefort (born 1957)	Nipissing—Timiskaming	April 28, 2025		Liberal		
Zoe Royer (born 1965/66)	Port Moody—Coquitlam	April 28, 2025		Liberal		
Amandeep Sodhi (born 2001)	Brampton Centre	April 28, 2025		Liberal		First female MP born in the 21st century (of 2)
Kristina Tesser Derksen (born 1978/79)	Milton East—Halton Hills South	April 28, 2025		Liberal		
Doly Begum (born 1989)	Scarborough Southwest	April 13, 2026		Liberal		First Bangladeshi-Canadian woman elected to Parliament
Danielle Martin (born 19?)	University—Rosedale	April 13, 2026		Liberal		First Egyptian-Canadian woman elected to Parliament

== Proportion of women in the House ==
Numbers and proportions are as they were directly after the relevant election and do not take into account by-elections, defections, or other changes in membership. Instead, women who were initially by-elected to their seats and later successful in holding them at a subsequent federal election are counted as having won the latter to serve full terms, if completed. "Others" include the Reform Party from 1988 to 1997, the Canadian Alliance only in 2000, Bloc Québécois since 1993, and the Greens since 2011.

Election	Conservative PC and antecedents, to 2003 Modern, since 2003			Liberal			CCF 1932–61, NDP since 1961			Others			Total		
Election	Women	Total	%	Women	Total	%	Women	Total	%	Women	Total	%	Women	Total	%
1921	0	49	0.0%	0	118	0.0%	N/A	N/A	N/A	1	10	10%	1	235	0.1%
1925	0	115	0.0%	0	100	0.0%	N/A	N/A	N/A	1	30	3.3%	1	245	0.4%
1926	0	91	0.0%	0	116	0.0%	N/A	N/A	N/A	1	38	2.6%	1	245	0.4%
1930	0	135	0.0%	0	89	0.0%	N/A	N/A	N/A	1	21	4.8%	1	245	0.4%
1935	0	39	0.0%	0	173	0.0%	0	7	0.0%	1	26	3.8%	2	245	1.5%
1940	0	39	0.0%	0	179	0.0%	0	8	0.0%	1	19	5.3%	1	245	0.4%
1945	0	66	0.0%	0	118	0.0%	1	28	3.6%	0	33	0.0%	1	245	0.4%
1949	0	41	2.0%	0	191	4.4%	0	13	11.1%	0	17	0.0%	0	262	0.0%
1953	3	51	5.9%	1	169	0.6%	0	23	0.0%	0	22	0.0%	4	265	1.5%
1957	2	112	<1.0%	0	105	5.1%	0	25	0.0%	0	23	0.0%	2	265	0.8%
1958	2	208	3.3%	0	48	5.0%	0	8	0.0%	0	1	0.0%	2	265	0.8%
1962	3	116	2.6%	2	99	2.0%	0	19	0.0%	0	31	0.0%	5	265	1.9%
1963	1	95	1.1%	3	128	2.3%	0	17	0.0%	0	7	14.3%	4	265	1.5%
1965	1	97	1.0%	2	131	1.5%	1	21	4.8%	0	16	0.0%	4	265	1.5%
1968	0	72	0.0%	0	155	0.0%	1	22	4.5%	0	16	70%	1	264	0.4%
1972	1	107	0.9%	3	109	2.8%	1	31	3.2%	0	17	0.0%	5	264	1.9%
1974	1	95	1.1%	8	141	5.7%	0	16	0.0%	0	12	0.0%	9	264	3.4%
1979	2	136	1.5%	6	114	5.3%	2	26	7.7%	0	6	0.0%	10	282	3.5%
1980	2	103	1.9%	6	147	4.1%	2	32	0.0%	0	0	0.0%	14	282	5.0%
1984	19	211	9.0%	5	40	12.5%	3	30	10.0%	0	1	0.0%	27	282	9.6%
1988	21	169	12.4%	13	83	15.7%	5	43	11.6%	0	0	0.0%	39	295	13.2%
1993	1	2	50.0%	36	177	23.9%	1	9	11.1%	15	107	14.0%	53	295	<18.0%
1997	2	20	10.0%	37	155	24.2%	8	21	38.1%	14	105	13.3%	61	301	20.3%
2000	2	12	16.7%	38	172	22.1%	5	13	38.5%	17	104	16.3%	81	301	26.9%
2004	12	99	12.1%	33	135	24.4%	5	19	26.3%	14	55	25.4%	64	308	20.8%
2006	14	128	10.9%	21	103	20.4%	12	29	41.4%	17	52	32.7%	64	308	20.8%
2008	23	143	16.1%	19	77	24.7%	12	37	32.4%	15	51	29.4%	69	308	22.4%
2011	28	166	16.9%	6	34	17.6%	40	103	38.8%	2	5	40.0%	76	308	24.7%
2015	17	99	17.2%	50	184	27.2%	18	44	41.0%	3	11	27.3%	88	338	26.0%
2019	22	121	18.2%	52	157	33.1%	9	24	37.5%	14	35	40.0%	99	338	29.3%
2021	22	119	18.5%	57	160	35.6%	11	25	44.0%	13	34	38.2%	103	338	30.5%
2025	26	143	18.8%	68	170	40.0%	4	7	57.1%	6	23	26.1%	104	343	30.3%
