= Yves Demers =

Canadian politician (born 1938)

Yves Demers (born 7 September 1938) was a Liberal party member of the House of Commons of Canada. He was a Chartered Accountant by career.

Born in Laval, Quebec, Demers was elected at Duvernay electoral district in the 1972 federal election and was re-elected in the 1974, 1979 and 1980 federal elections. Demers was defeated in the 1984 federal election by Vincent Della Noce of the Progressive Conservative party. He served in the 30th, 31st and 32nd Canadian Parliaments.
