= Vincent Della Noce =

Canadian politician

Vincent Della Noce (born 18 November 1943 in Italy) was a member of the House of Commons of Canada. He was a businessman by career.

He represented the Quebec riding of Duvernay where he was first elected in the 1984 federal election and re-elected in 1988, therefore becoming a member in the 33rd and 34th Canadian Parliaments. He was a member of the Progressive Conservative party.

After the riding name was changed to Laval East, Della Noce was defeated in the 1993 federal election by Maud Debien of the Bloc Québécois. He made another unsuccessful attempt to regain the electoral district in the 1997 federal election.
