= Carole-Marie Allard =

Canadian politician

Member of the Canadian Parliament for Laval East
- In office November 27, 2000 – June 28, 2004
- Preceded by: Maud Debien
- Succeeded by: District abolished (2003)

Personal details
- Born: September 6, 1949 Dolbeau, Quebec, Canada
- Died: March 18, 2024 (aged 74) Laval, Quebec, Canada
- Party: Liberal
- Relations: Mélanie Joly (stepdaughter)

Carole-Marie Allard (September 6, 1949 – March 18, 2024) was a Canadian politician who served as a Liberal member of Canada's House of Commons. She represented the riding of Laval East from 2000 to 2004. She was Parliamentary Secretary to the Minister of Canadian Heritage, and a member of the Standing Committee on Justice and Human Rights and the vice-chair of the Special Committee on Non-medical use of drugs. She lost the 2004 election to Robert Carrier of the Bloc Québécois in the riding of Alfred-Pellan.

She was a lawyer, press attaché, designer, organizer and presenter of media management training programs, a spokesperson for a corporation, and she was journalist, writer and producer.

She was the stepmother of Mélanie Joly who is a member of the House of Commons of Canada representing Ahuntsic-Cartierville and also served as a cabinet minister in the governments of Justin Trudeau and Mark Carney.

== Partial electoral record ==
2004 Canadian federal election: Alfred-Pellan
| Party | Candidate | Votes | % | ±% | Expenditures |
|---|---|---|---|---|---|
| Bloc Québécois | Robert Carrier | 26,239 | 49.20 | +6.65 | $38,963 |
| Liberal | Carole-Marie Allard | 21,116 | 39.59 | −5.18 | $70,978 |
| Conservative | Rosane Raymond | 2,703 | 5.07 | −3.21 | $10,199 |
| New Democratic | Benjamin Le Bel | 1,849 | 3.47 | +2.48 | $2,108 |
| Green | Louis-Philippe Verenka | 1,132 | 2.12 | +0.98 | $0 |
| Independent | Yves Denois | 204 | 0.38 | – | none listed |
| Independent | Régent Millette | 89 | 0.17 | −0.27 | none listed |
| Total valid votes | | 53,232 | 100.00 | | |
| Total rejected ballots | | 1,128 | 2.07 | | |
| Turnout | | 54,460 | 67.95 | | |
| Eligible voters | | 80,148 | | | |
| Bloc Québécois gain from Liberal | | Swing | | +5.92 | |
Note: Conservative vote is compared to the total of the Canadian Alliance vote and Progressive Conservative vote in the 2000 election.

2000 Canadian federal election: Laval East
| Party | Candidate | Votes | % | ±% | Expenditures |
|---|---|---|---|---|---|
| Liberal | Carole-Marie Allard | 26,018 | 44.77 | +12.66 | $69,391 |
| Bloc Québécois | Mathieu Alarie | 24,726 | 42.55 | +4.09 | $71,179 |
| Progressive Conservative | André G. Plourde | 2,459 | 4.23 | −23.93 | none listed |
| Alliance | Rosane Raymond | 2,354 | 4.05 | – | $877 |
| Marijuana | Christian Lajoie | 892 | 1.53 | – | $157 |
| Green | Frédéric Gauvin | 660 | 1.14 | – | $108 |
| New Democratic | Sujata Dey | 573 | 0.99 | −0.28 | none listed |
| Independent | Régent Millette | 255 | 0.44 | – | none listed |
| Marxist–Leninist | Gabriel Cornellier-Brunelle | 178 | 0.31 | – | $10 |
| Total valid votes | | 58,115 | 97.4 | | |
| Total rejected ballots | | 1,535 | 2.6 | | |
| Turnout | | 59,650 | 68.7 | | |
| Eligible voters | | 86,759 | | | |
| Liberal gain from Bloc Québécois | | Swing | | +4.29 | |
Sources: Official Results, Elections Canada and Financial Returns, Elections Canada.

== Books ==
- Allard, Carole-Marie (1990). Lavalin : les ficelles du pouvoir. Collection Gens du pays. Chicoutimi, Québec: Éditions JCL. pp. 317 p. : ill., 23 cm. ISBN 2920176897.
- Allard, Carole-Marie (c. 1992). L'Affaire Claire Lortie : l'histoire du congélateur. Collection Énigmes. Chicoutimi, Québec: JCL. pp. 279 p. : ill., portr., 22 cm. ISBN 2894311079.
