= Robert Carrier (politician) =

Canadian politician (born 1941)

Member of Parliament for Alfred-Pellan
- In office 2004–2011
- Preceded by: Carole-Marie Allard
- Succeeded by: Rosane Doré Lefebvre

Personal details
- Born: June 3, 1941 (age 85) Montreal, Quebec, Canada
- Party: Bloc Québécois
- Profession: engineer, political adviser, project coordinator

Robert Carrier (born June 3, 1941) is a Canadian politician, engineer, political adviser, and a project coordinator. Carrier was a Bloc Québécois member of the House of Commons of Canada from 2004 until 2011.

Born in Montreal, Quebec, Carrier was first elected in the 2004 federal election in the riding of Alfred-Pellan in Laval, Quebec. However, he was defeated in the 2011 election by NDP's Rosane Doré Lefebvre. Carrier stood as a candidate for the Parti Québécois in the Mille-Îles electoral district during the 2012 Quebec election. On election night, he placed second behind the winner, Francine Charbonneau of the Liberals.

== Electoral record (partial) ==
2012 Quebec general election: Mille-Îles
| Party | Candidate | Votes | % | ±% |
|---|---|---|---|---|
| Liberal | Francine Charbonneau | 11,908 | 37.36 | -9.40 |
| Parti Québécois | Robert Carrier | 10,138 | 31.81 | -4.61 |
| Coalition Avenir Québec | Jean Prud'homme | 7,420 | 23.28 | |
| Québec solidaire | Nicole Bellerose | 1,508 | 4.73 | +2.03 |
| Green | Henrico Negro | 376 | 1.18 | -1.53 |
| Option nationale | Alain Sénécal | 352 | 1.10 | |
| Independent | Régent Millette | 121 | 0.38 | |
| Union citoyenne | Carlos Silva | 52 | 0.16 | |
| Total valid votes | | | | – |
| Total rejected ballots | | | | – |
| Turnout | | | | |
| Electors on the lists | | | – | – |

2011 Canadian federal election: Alfred-Pellan
| Party | Candidate | Votes | % | ±% |
|---|---|---|---|---|
| New Democratic | Rosane Doré Lefebvre | 23,098 | 42.09 | +30.06 |
| Bloc Québécois | Robert Carrier | 12,504 | 22.79 | -16.04 |
| Liberal | Angelo Iacono | 12,070 | 22.00 | -7.27 |
| Conservative | Pierre Lefebvre | 6,157 | 11.22 | -5.04 |
| Green | Dylan Perceval-Maxwell | 798 | 1.45 | -1.68 |
| Independent | Régent Millette | 245 | 0.45 | -0.04 |
| Total valid votes/Expense limit | | 54,872 | 100.00 | |
| Total rejected ballots | | 745 | 1.34 | -0.02 |
| Turnout | | 55,617 | 65.91 | -0.14 |
| New Democratic gain from Bloc Québécois | | Swing | | +23.05 |

2008 Canadian federal election: Alfred-Pellan
| Party | Candidate | Votes | % | ±% | Expenditures |
|---|---|---|---|---|---|
| Bloc Québécois | Robert Carrier | 20,686 | 38.83 | −4.14 | $59,983 |
| Liberal | Wilson Saintelmy | 15,594 | 29.27 | +1.68 | $51,830 |
| Conservative | Alexandre Salameh | 8,662 | 16.26 | −2.66 | $72,184 |
| New Democratic | Cynthia Roy | 6,406 | 12.03 | +4.92 | $3,131 |
| Green | Tristan Desjardins Drouin | 1,665 | 3.13 | −0.28 | $325 |
| Independent | Régent Millette | 259 | 0.49 | – | none listed |
| Total valid votes | | 53,272 | 100.00 | | |
| Total rejected ballots | | 737 | 1.36 | | |
| Turnout | | 54,009 | 66.05 | | |
| Electors on the lists | | 81,766 | | | |

2004 Canadian federal election: Alfred-Pellan
| Party | Candidate | Votes | % | ±% | Expenditures |
|---|---|---|---|---|---|
| Bloc Québécois | Robert Carrier | 26,239 | 49.20 | +6.65 | $38,963 |
| Liberal | Carole-Marie Allard | 21,116 | 39.59 | −5.18 | $70,978 |
| Conservative | Rosane Raymond | 2,703 | 5.07 | −3.21 | $10,199 |
| New Democratic | Benjamin Le Bel | 1,849 | 3.47 | +2.48 | $2,108 |
| Green | Louis-Philippe Verenka | 1,132 | 2.12 | +0.98 | $0 |
| Independent | Yves Denois | 204 | 0.38 | – | none listed |
| Independent | Régent Millette | 89 | 0.17 | −0.27 | none listed |
| Total valid votes | | 53,232 | 100.00 | | |
| Total rejected ballots | | 1,128 | 2.07 | | |
| Turnout | | 54,460 | 67.95 | | |
| Eligible voters | | 80,148 | | | |
| Bloc Québécois gain from Liberal | | Swing | | +5.92 | |
Note: Conservative vote is compared to the total of the Canadian Alliance vote and Progressive Conservative vote in the 2000 election.
