= Angelo Iacono =

Canadian politician and lawyer

Angelo Iacono MP
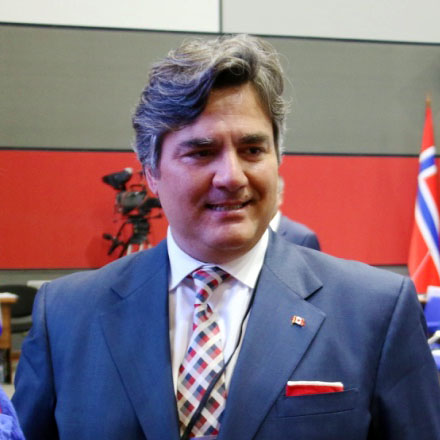
- Iacono at the OSCE in Minsk in 2017

Member of Parliament for Alfred-Pellan
- Incumbent
- Assumed office October 19, 2015
- Prime Minister: Justin Trudeau
- Preceded by: Rosane Doré Lefebvre

Personal details
- Born: Montreal, Quebec, Canada
- Party: Liberal
- Education: McGill University; Université du Québec à Montréal; University of Ottawa; University of Lyon
- Profession: Attorney
- Committees: Library of Parliament; Transport
- Website: https://angeloiacono.liberal.ca/

Angelo G. Iacono MP is a Canadian Liberal politician, who was elected to represent the riding of Alfred-Pellan in the House of Commons of Canada in the 2015 federal election.

Iacono attended McGill University, earning a Bachelor of Arts degree in political science, and then studied law at both the Université du Québec à Montréal (civil law) and the University of Ottawa (common law), as well as attending the University of Lyon in France.

Iacono was the Liberal Party's candidate in Alfred-Pellan during the 2011 federal election, finishing third. He was elected chair of the Canadian House of Commons Standing Committee on Environment and Sustainable Development in the 45th Canadian Parliament in 2025.

== Electoral record ==
2025 Canadian federal election: Alfred-Pellan
Party	Candidate	Votes	%	±%	Expenditures
Liberal	Angelo Iacono	32,934	54.59	+6.88	
Conservative	Louis Ialenti	12,671	21.00	+7.72	
Bloc Québécois	Isabel Dion	12,259	20.32	-6.26	
New Democratic	Jordan Larochelle	2,044	3.39	-4.43	
People's	Ludovic Mbany	423	0.70	+0.36	
Total valid votes/expense limit		60,331	98.35		
Total rejected ballots		1,015	1.65		
Turnout		61,346	69.57		
Eligible voters		88,183			
Liberal notional hold		Swing		-0.42	
Source: Elections Canada
Note: number of eligible voters does not include voting day registrations.

2021 Canadian federal election: Alfred-Pellan
Party	Candidate	Votes	%	±%	Expenditures
Liberal	Angelo Iacono	24,516	47.83	–0.07	$106,747.03
Bloc Québécois	Isabel Dion	13,399	26.14	–2.49	$13,157.76
Conservative	Angiolino D'Anello	6,988	13.63	+2.73	$10,013.51
New Democratic	Cindy Mercer	3,946	7.70	+0.13	$0.00
Free	Dwayne Cappelletti	1,467	2.86	N/A	$1,185.39
Green	Pierre-Alexandre Corneillet	940	1.83	–1.78	$0.00
Total valid votes		51,256	100.00	–	$110,244.59
Total rejected ballots		1,176	2.24	+0.48	
Turnout		52,432	66.63	–3.27	
Registered voters		78,697			
Liberal hold		Swing		+1.21	
Source: Elections Canada

2019 Canadian federal election: Alfred-Pellan
Party	Candidate	Votes	%	±%	Expenditures
Liberal	Angelo Iacono	26,015	47.90	+3.39	$97,523.02
Bloc Québécois	Michel Lachance	15,549	28.63	+10.80	$16,657.44
Conservative	Angelo Esposito	5,917	10.90	-0.45	none listed
New Democratic	Andriana Kocini	4,109	7.57	-16.41	$443.23
Green	Marguerite Howells	1,958	3.61	+1.63	$0.00
People's	Mathieu Couture	471	0.87		$6,000.82
Pour l'Indépendance du Québec	Julius Buté	177	0.33		$0.00
Independent	Dwayne Cappelletti	113	0.21		$582.53
Total valid votes/expense limit		54,309	98.24		
Total rejected ballots		973	1.76	+0.54	
Turnout		55,282	69.90	+2.59	
Eligible voters		79,083			
Liberal hold		Swing		-3.71	
Source: Elections Canada

2015 Canadian federal election: Alfred-Pellan
Party	Candidate	Votes	%	±%	Expenditures
Liberal	Angelo Iacono	24,557	44.51	+22.19	$112,927.21
New Democratic	Rosane Doré Lefebvre	13,225	23.97	-18.24	$58,909.82
Bloc Québécois	Daniel St-Hilaire	9,836	17.83	-4.52	$39,062.31
Conservative	Gabriel Purcarus	6,259	11.35	+0.14	$8,181.47
Green	Lynda Briguene	1,089	1.97	+0.52	$4,610.57
Independent	Renata Isopo	203	0.37	–	–
Total valid votes/Expense limit		55,169	98.78		$212,592.47
Total rejected ballots		679	–	–	
Turnout		55,848	71.34	–	
Eligible voters		78,288			
Liberal gain from New Democratic		Swing		+20.22	
Source: Elections Canada

2011 Canadian federal election: Alfred-Pellan
Party	Candidate	Votes	%	±%
New Democratic	Rosane Doré Lefebvre	23,098	42.09	+30.06
Bloc Québécois	Robert Carrier	12,504	22.79	-16.04
Liberal	Angelo Iacono	12,070	22.00	-7.27
Conservative	Pierre Lefebvre	6,157	11.22	-5.04
Green	Dylan Perceval-Maxwell	798	1.45	-1.68
Independent	Régent Millette	245	0.45	-0.04
Total valid votes/Expense limit		54,872	100.00	
Total rejected ballots		745	1.34	-0.02
Turnout		55,617	65.91	-0.14
New Democratic gain from Bloc Québécois		Swing		+23.05
