= Raymonde Folco =

Canadian politician

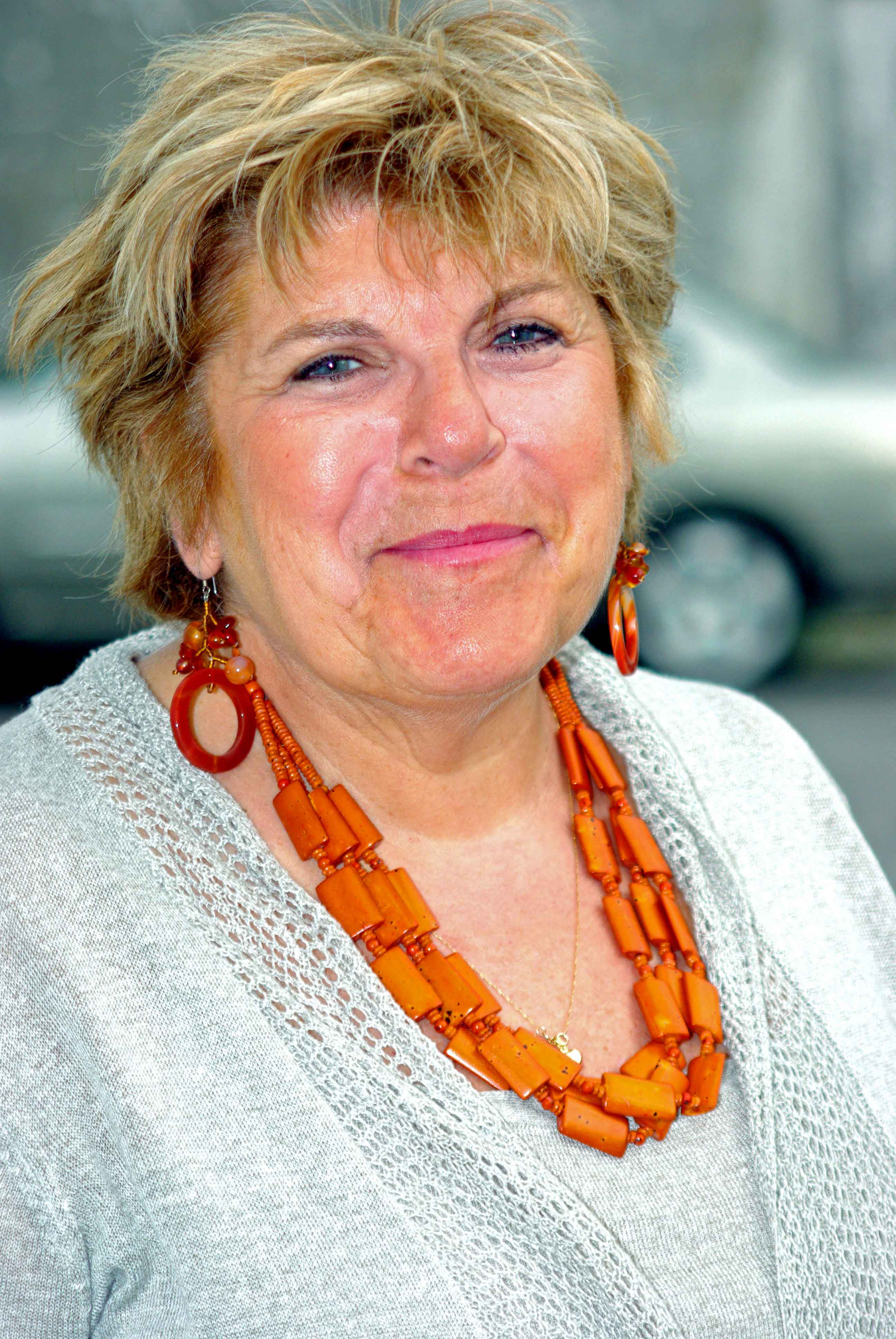

Member of Parliament for Laval West
- In office June 2, 1997 – June 28, 2004
- Preceded by: Michel Dupuy
- Succeeded by: riding dissolved

Member of Parliament for Laval—Les Îles
- In office June 28, 2004 – May 2, 2011
- Preceded by: first member

Personal details
- Born: Raymonde Goldgrav; March 16, 1940 (age 86) Paris, France
- Party: Liberal
- Profession: Business administrator/public servant/educational advisor

Raymonde Folco (née Goldgrav; born March 16, 1940) is a Canadian politician, member of the Liberal Party of Canada. She represented the Quebec riding of Laval—Les Îles in the House of Commons of Canada through 5 successive parliaments from 1997 to 2011, when she left politics.

Born in Paris in 1940 to a Jewish family, she survived the Holocaust being hidden by Christian families outside the city; her father escaped an Auschwitz-bound transport and both her parents fought in the French Resistance. She received a Bachelor of Arts (History) from the University of Melbourne (Australia), a Baccalauréat Spécialisé in Linguistics from the Université du Québec à Montréal, and a Master of Arts in Applied Linguistics from Concordia University (Montreal).

Folco was vice president in 1988 and president from 1990 to 1995 of the Conseil des Communautés culturelles et de l'Immigration. This agency's role is to advise the government on matters relating to the immigration and integration of ethnic minorities.

In 1996–97 she acted as Commissioner with the Immigration and Refugee Board of Canada, an independent administrative tribunal, responsible for making well-reasoned decisions on the status of persons seeking refugee status in Canada, in accordance with the law.

== Political career ==
She was recruited to the Liberal Party of Canada and ran for the House of Commons of Canada as candidate for the Quebec riding of Laval East in 1993, but lost to Maud Debien.

In 1997, Folco won the federal Liberal nomination for the riding of Laval West. There, she was elected in the 1997 and 2000 general elections, then reelected in 2004, 2006, and 2008 for the newly-formed riding of Laval—Les Îles.

From 1999 to 2003 she represented the Canadian Liberal Party at the Liberal International, where she was elected treasurer, then vice-president.

After serving five terms as MP of Laval-Ouest and Laval-Les Îles, Folco retired from politics in 2011, choosing not to run in the 2011 general elections.

During her time in Parliament Folco has held several leadership roles that have focused on immigration and women: elected vice-chair of the Permanent Committee on Immigration, chair of the Liberal Caucus on immigration, co-chair of the Women's Day at the Liberal Party National Congresses 2003 and 1994.

From 2004 to 2011 she was elected chair of the Standing Committee on Human Resources. In 2000 she was appointed Parliamentary Secretary to the Minister of Human Resources, with special emphasis on immigration and labour markets and chaired the Quebec Liberal Caucus.

In opposition, she was named Official Opposition Critic for immigration from 2006 to 2007 and travelled extensively to advocate for greater coordination between federal and provincial legislations and regulations on labour market and immigration.

She was frequently called upon to deal directly with foreign governments, as chair of the Parliamentary Association for the Caribbean, and from 2006 to 2011 as Official Liberal Critic for La Francophonie.

She was elected vice-chair of the Inter-American Parliamentary Group on Population and Development (IAPG) where, under her chairmanship, the Canadian Association of Parliamentarians for Population and Development (CAPPD) organized and hosted the 2010 Global Annual Parliamentarians' Summit: Balancing the Scales of Women's Lives in the Countdown to 2015.

== After politics ==
Since her departure from federal politics, Folco has remained active and a prominent supporter of the Liberal Party of Canada.

She has travelled to Kuwait, Dubai, Abu Dhabi, and Vancouver, giving a series of lectures dealing with Women in Politics, Immigration, language legislation in Canada.

Folco worked as a consultant for the National Democratic Institute (NDI) as Senior Program Manager for Gender Programming in Mali and with UNWomen, as Senior Election Expert in preparation for the general elections.

== Electoral record ==
=== October 2008, Laval—Les Îles ===
Candidate	Party	Vote	%
Zahia El-Masri	New Democratic Party	6,124	11.5
Agop Evereklian	Conservative Party of Canada	11,017	20.6
Raymonde Folco	Liberal Party of Canada	21,603	40.5
Mohamedali Jetha	Bloc Québécois	12,576	23.6
Brent Neil	Green Party of Canada	1,752	3.3
Sylvain A. Trottier		336	0.6
Total		53,408	100

=== January 2006, Laval—Les Îles ===
Candidate	Party	Vote	%
Raymonde Folco	Liberal Party of Canada	20,849	39.3
Alain Giguère	New Democratic Party	3,817	7.2
Qais Hamidi	Conservative Party of Canada	9,055	17.1
Theodore Kouretas	Green Party of Canada	1,557	2.9
Christiane Pichette	Bloc Québécois	17,537	33.1
Polyvios Tsakanikas	Marxist–Leninist Party of Canada	211	0.4
Total		53,026	100
