= Rosane Doré Lefebvre =

Canadian politician (born 1984)

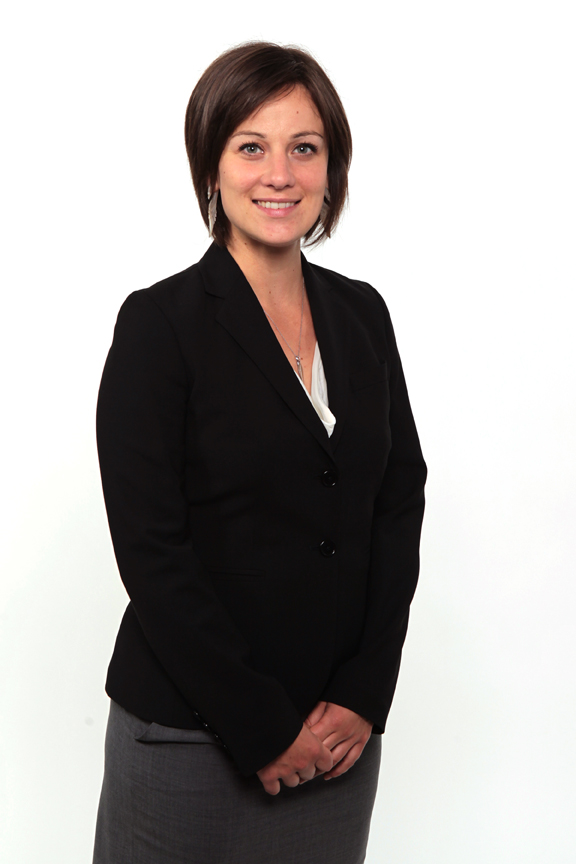

Member of Parliament for Alfred-Pellan
- In office May 2, 2011 – August 4, 2015
- Preceded by: Robert Carrier
- Succeeded by: Angelo Iacono

Personal details
- Born: October 21, 1984 (age 41) Laval, Quebec, Canada
- Party: New Democratic Party
- Profession: Environmentalist, sales agent

Rosane Doré Lefebvre (born October 21, 1984) is a Canadian politician, who was elected to the House of Commons of Canada in the 2011 election. She represented the electoral district of Alfred-Pellan as an MP with the New Democratic Party in the 41st Canadian Parliament.

Prior to being elected, Doré Lefebvre was an environmental activist. She has a degree in political science and geography from the University of Montreal.

== Early life ==
Doré Lefebvre was born in a predominantly agricultural region of eastern Laval to Sylvie Doré, an upholsterer, and Robert Lefebvre, a general contractor. She attended Horizon Jeunesse High School and CÉGEP de Terrebonne.

== Education and environmental activism ==
Doré Lefebvre received a Bachelor of Arts from the Université de Montréal in political science and geography in 2010. She was an environmental activist and worked for the Quebec Ministry of Sustainable Development, the Environment, Fauna and Parks prior to her election.

== Political career ==
In the 2011 Canadian General Election, Doré Lefebvre ran in her home riding of Alfred-Pellan, in eastern Laval, for the New Democratic Party (NDP). She defeated incumbent Bloc Québécois candidate Robert Carrier by over 10,500 votes.

Following her election, Doré Lefebvre's NDP colleagues voted her vice-chair of the federal caucus. She was also selected to chair the legislative committee, where she would be responsible for coordinating the NDP MPs' analysis of proposed laws. In April 2012, Doré Lefebvre was named by NDP leader Thomas Mulcair to the shadow cabinet as Deputy Critic for Public Safety.

In her role as Deputy Critic for Public Safety, Doré Lefebvre has taken on important portfolios related to border security, Canada's network of penitentiaries and the treatment of women in the penal system. She has been sharply critical of the closing of the Leclerc Institution, within her riding, as well as the mistreatment of female prisoners and inadequate border security practices.

Doré Lefebvre's work with citizens in Laval garnered national media attention in early 2013, when she fought the deportation of the Reyes-Mendes family, who resided in her riding.

Doré Lefebvre was defeated in the 2015 election by Liberal candidate Angelo Iacono.
