= Alfred-Pellan =

Federal electoral district in Quebec, Canada

Coordinates: 45.666°N 73.628°W

Quebec electoral district
- Interactive map of riding boundaries from the 2025 federal election

Federal electoral district
- Legislature: House of Commons
MP
Angelo Iacono
Liberal
- District created: 1966
- First contested: 1968
- Last contested: 2025
- District webpage: profile, map

Demographics
- Population (2021): 102,020
- Electors (2019): 79,083
- Area (km²): 113.98
- Pop. density (per km²): 895.1
- Census division: Laval
- Census subdivision: Laval (part)

Alfred-Pellan (formerly Duvernay and Laval East) is a federal electoral district in Quebec, Canada, that has been represented in the House of Commons of Canada since 1968. Its population in 2006 was 104,765.

== Geography ==
The district includes the neighbourhoods of Duvernay, Pont-Viau, Saint-François, Saint-Vincent-de-Paul and the eastern part of the neighbourhood of Vimont in the City of Laval.

The neighbouring ridings are Marc-Aurèle-Fortin, Thérèse-De Blainville, Terrebonne, Honoré-Mercier, Bourassa, Ahuntsic-Cartierville, and Vimy.

== Demographics ==
According to the 2021 Canadian census
Languages: English (17.45%), French (75.07%), English and French (6.36%), Neither English nor French (1.10%)
Religions: Christian (69.15%), None (18.38%), Muslim (10.82%), Buddhist (1.13%), Hindu (0.21%), Other (0.21%), Jewish (0.10%)
Median total income (2020): 42,800$

== History ==
The riding was created in 1968 from Laval and was known as Duvernay until 1990 when it became Laval East. Upon redistribution in 2003 it was renamed Alfred-Pellan after the famous Quebec artist Alfred Pellan. Also it lost a small part of its territory to the newly created Marc-Aurèle-Fortin riding.

The riding lost territory to Vimy and Marc-Aurèle-Fortin during the 2012 electoral redistribution.

Following the 2022 Canadian federal electoral redistribution, it gained territory east of Boul. des Laurentides from Vimy.

=== Member of Parliament ===
This riding has elected the following members of Parliament:

Parliament	Years	Member	Party
Duvernay; Riding created from Laval
28th	1968–1972	Eric Kierans	Liberal
29th	1972–1974	Yves Demers	Liberal
30th	1974–1979	Yves Demers	Liberal
31st	1979–1980	Yves Demers	Liberal
32nd	1980–1984	Yves Demers	Liberal
33rd	1984–1988	Vincent Della Noce	Progressive Conservative
34th	1988–1993	Vincent Della Noce	Progressive Conservative
Laval East
35th	1993–1997	Maud Debien	Bloc Québécois
36th	1997–2000	Maud Debien	Bloc Québécois
37th	2000–2004	Carole-Marie Allard	Liberal
Alfred-Pellan
38th	2004–2006	Robert Carrier	Bloc Québécois
39th	2006–2008	Robert Carrier	Bloc Québécois
40th	2008–2011	Robert Carrier	Bloc Québécois
41st	2011–2015	Rosane Doré Lefebvre	New Democratic
42nd	2015–2019	Angelo Iacono	Liberal
43rd	2019–2021	Angelo Iacono	Liberal
44th	2021–2025	Angelo Iacono	Liberal
45th	2025–present	Angelo Iacono	Liberal

== Election results ==
Graph of election results in Alfred-Pellan (2004–, minor parties that never got 2% of the vote or didn't run consistently are omitted) View source data.

=== Alfred-Pellan, 2003 - present ===
2025 Canadian federal election
Party	Candidate	Votes	%	±%	Expenditures
Liberal	Angelo Iacono	32,934	54.59	+6.88	$105,955.22
Conservative	Louis Ialenti	12,671	21.00	+7.72	$35,682.26
Bloc Québécois	Isabel Dion	12,259	20.32	-6.26	$12,581.08
New Democratic	Jordan Larochelle	2,044	3.39	-4.43	$0.00
People's	Ludovic Mbany	423	0.70	+0.36	$0.00
Total valid votes/expense limit		60,331	98.35	–	$134,265.60
Total rejected ballots		1,015	1.65		
Turnout		61,346	69.57		
Eligible voters		88,183			
Liberal notional hold		Swing		-0.42	
Source: Elections Canada
Note: number of eligible voters does not include voting day registrations.

2021 Canadian federal election
Party	Candidate	Votes	%	±%	Expenditures
Liberal	Angelo Iacono	24,516	47.83	–0.07	$106,747.03
Bloc Québécois	Isabel Dion	13,399	26.14	–2.49	$13,157.76
Conservative	Angiolino D'Anello	6,988	13.63	+2.73	$10,013.51
New Democratic	Cindy Mercer	3,946	7.70	+0.13	$0.00
Free	Dwayne Cappelletti	1,467	2.86	N/A	$1,185.39
Green	Pierre-Alexandre Corneillet	940	1.83	–1.78	$0.00
Total valid votes		51,256	100.00	–	$110,244.59
Total rejected ballots		1,176	2.24	+0.48	
Turnout		52,432	66.63	–3.27	
Registered voters		78,697			
Liberal hold		Swing		+1.21	
Source: Elections Canada

2021 federal election redistributed results
Party	Vote	%
Liberal	26,946	47.71
Bloc Québécois	15,013	26.58
Conservative	7,497	13.28
New Democratic	4,419	7.82
Green	940	1.66
People's	192	0.34
Others	1,467	2.60

2019 Canadian federal election
Party	Candidate	Votes	%	±%	Expenditures
Liberal	Angelo Iacono	26,015	47.90	+3.39	$97,523.02
Bloc Québécois	Michel Lachance	15,549	28.63	+10.80	$16,657.44
Conservative	Angelo Esposito	5,917	10.90	-0.45	none listed
New Democratic	Andriana Kocini	4,109	7.57	-16.41	$443.23
Green	Marguerite Howells	1,958	3.61	+1.63	$0.00
People's	Mathieu Couture	471	0.87		$6,000.82
Pour l'Indépendance du Québec	Julius Buté	177	0.33		$0.00
Independent	Dwayne Cappelletti	113	0.21		$582.53
Total valid votes/expense limit		54,309	98.24		
Total rejected ballots		973	1.76	+0.54	
Turnout		55,282	69.90	+2.59	
Eligible voters		79,083			
Liberal hold		Swing		-3.71	
Source: Elections Canada

2015 Canadian federal election: Alfred-Pellan
Party	Candidate	Votes	%	±%	Expenditures
Liberal	Angelo Iacono	24,557	44.51	+22.19	$112,927.21
New Democratic	Rosane Doré Lefebvre	13,225	23.97	-18.24	$58,909.82
Bloc Québécois	Daniel St-Hilaire	9,836	17.83	-4.52	$39,062.31
Conservative	Gabriel Purcarus	6,259	11.35	+0.14	$8,181.47
Green	Lynda Briguene	1,089	1.97	+0.52	$4,610.57
Independent	Renata Isopo	203	0.37	–	–
Total valid votes/Expense limit		55,169	98.78		$212,592.47
Total rejected ballots		679	–	–	
Turnout		55,848	71.34	–	
Eligible voters		78,288			
Liberal gain from New Democratic		Swing		+20.22	
Source: Elections Canada

2011 federal election redistributed results
Party	Vote	%
New Democratic	20,329	42.21
Bloc Québécois	10,766	22.35
Liberal	10,751	22.32
Conservative	5,398	11.21
Green	697	1.45
Others	219	0.45

2011 Canadian federal election
Party	Candidate	Votes	%	±%
New Democratic	Rosane Doré Lefebvre	23,098	42.09	+30.06
Bloc Québécois	Robert Carrier	12,504	22.79	-16.04
Liberal	Angelo Iacono	12,070	22.00	-7.27
Conservative	Pierre Lefebvre	6,157	11.22	-5.04
Green	Dylan Perceval-Maxwell	798	1.45	-1.68
Independent	Régent Millette	245	0.45	-0.04
Total valid votes/Expense limit		54,872	100.00	
Total rejected ballots		745	1.34	-0.02
Turnout		55,617	65.91	-0.14
New Democratic gain from Bloc Québécois		Swing		+23.05

2008 Canadian federal election: Alfred-Pellan
Party	Candidate	Votes	%	±%	Expenditures
Bloc Québécois	Robert Carrier	20,686	38.83	−4.14	$59,983
Liberal	Wilson Saintelmy	15,594	29.27	+1.68	$51,830
Conservative	Alexandre Salameh	8,662	16.26	−2.66	$72,184
New Democratic	Cynthia Roy	6,406	12.03	+4.92	$3,131
Green	Tristan Desjardins Drouin	1,665	3.13	−0.28	$325
Independent	Régent Millette	259	0.49	–	none listed
Total valid votes		53,272	100.00		
Total rejected ballots		737	1.36		
Turnout		54,009	66.05		
Electors on the lists		81,766			

2006 Canadian federal election: Alfred-Pellan
Party	Candidate	Votes	%	±%	Expenditures
Bloc Québécois	Robert Carrier	23,193	42.97	-6.23	$40,539
Liberal	Jean-Claude Gobé	14,895	27.59	-12.00	$78,159
Conservative	Rosanne Raymond	10,210	18.92	+13.85	$16,233
New Democratic	Martin Leduc	3,838	7.11	+3.64	$4,371
Green	Christien Lajoie	1,842	3.41	+1.29	
Total valid votes/expense limit		53,978	100.00	$80,448	
Total rejected ballots		791	1.44		
Turnout		54,769	68.18	+2.13	
Electors on the list		80,328			

2004 Canadian federal election: Alfred-Pellan
Party	Candidate	Votes	%	±%	Expenditures
Bloc Québécois	Robert Carrier	26,239	49.20	+6.65	$38,963
Liberal	Carole-Marie Allard	21,116	39.59	−5.18	$70,978
Conservative	Rosane Raymond	2,703	5.07	−3.21	$10,199
New Democratic	Benjamin Le Bel	1,849	3.47	+2.48	$2,108
Green	Louis-Philippe Verenka	1,132	2.12	+0.98	$0
Independent	Yves Denois	204	0.38	–	none listed
Independent	Régent Millette	89	0.17	−0.27	none listed
Total valid votes		53,232	100.00		
Total rejected ballots		1,128	2.07		
Turnout		54,460	67.95		
Eligible voters		80,148			
Bloc Québécois gain from Liberal		Swing		+5.92	
Note: Conservative vote is compared to the total of the Canadian Alliance vote and Progressive Conservative vote in the 2000 election.

=== Laval East, 1990 - 2003 ===
2000 Canadian federal election: Laval East
Party	Candidate	Votes	%	±%	Expenditures
Liberal	Carole-Marie Allard	26,018	44.77	+12.66	$69,391
Bloc Québécois	Mathieu Alarie	24,726	42.55	+4.09	$71,179
Progressive Conservative	André G. Plourde	2,459	4.23	−23.93	none listed
Alliance	Rosane Raymond	2,354	4.05	–	$877
Marijuana	Christian Lajoie	892	1.53	–	$157
Green	Frédéric Gauvin	660	1.14	–	$108
New Democratic	Sujata Dey	573	0.99	−0.28	none listed
Independent	Régent Millette	255	0.44	–	none listed
Marxist–Leninist	Gabriel Cornellier-Brunelle	178	0.31	–	$10
Total valid votes		58,115	97.4		
Total rejected ballots		1,535	2.6		
Turnout		59,650	68.7		
Eligible voters		86,759			
Liberal gain from Bloc Québécois		Swing		+4.29	
Sources: Official Results, Elections Canada and Financial Returns, Elections Canada.

1997 Canadian federal election
Party	Candidate	Votes	%	±%
Bloc Québécois	Maud Debien	23,093	38.46	−13.48
Liberal	Nathalie Paradis	19,279	32.11	+5.27
Progressive Conservative	Vincent Della Noce	16,912	28.16	+9.80
New Democratic	Peter Graefe	765	1.27	+0.18
Total valid votes		60,049	96.4	
Total rejected ballots		2,246	3.6	
Turnout		62,295	79.5	
Eligible voters		78,364		
Bloc Québécois hold		Swing		−9.37
Source: Elections Canada

1993 Canadian federal election
Party	Candidate	Votes	%	±%
Bloc Québécois	Maud Debien	31,491	51.94	–
Liberal	Raymonde Folco	16,270	26.84	+3.93
Progressive Conservative	Vincent Della Noce	11,131	18.36	−42.38
New Democratic	Stéphane Houle	662	1.09	−13.72
Natural Law	Denis Cauchon	587	0.97	–
Abolitionist	Denise Beaubien	363	0.60	–
Commonwealth of Canada	François Lépine	125	0.21	−0.46
Total valid votes		60,629	100.00	

=== Duvernay, 1966 - 1990 ===
1988 Canadian federal election
Party	Candidate	Votes	%	±%
Progressive Conservative	Vincent Della Noce	33,426	60.47	+10.38
Liberal	Pierre Amaranian	12,607	22.91	-8.21
New Democratic	Michel Agnaieff	8,147	14.81	+6.36
Social Credit	Émilien Martel	480	0.87	+0.58
Commonwealth of Canada	Brigitte Bergeron	368	0.67	+0.56
Total valid votes		55,028	100.00	

1984 Canadian federal election
Party	Candidate	Votes	%	±%
Progressive Conservative	Vincent Della Noce	29,877	50.36	+42.72
Liberal	Yves Demers	18,465	31.12	-41.31
New Democratic	John Shatilla	5,013	8.45	-2.17
Parti nationaliste	Denis Monière	3,195	5.39	–
Rhinoceros	Patrice Charlot St-Onge	2,088	3.52	-1.68
Independent	A. Léo Larocque	453	0.76	–
Social Credit	Émilien Martel	174	0.29	-2.94
Commonwealth of Canada	Pierre Leheurteux	66	0.11	–
Total valid votes		59,331	100.00	

1980 Canadian federal election
Party	Candidate	Votes	%	±%
Liberal	Yves Demers	34,560	72.43	+4.30
New Democratic	John Shatilla	5,069	10.62	+5.14
Progressive Conservative	Pierre Pelletier	3,647	7.64	-0.38
Rhinoceros	Pierre Elliott Vaillancourt	2,479	5.20	+2.12
Social Credit	Émilien Martel	1,542	3.23	-11.15
Union populaire	Roger-Marc Lalande	218	0.46	+0.04
Marxist–Leninist	Sylvie Bourgeois	112	0.23	-0.01
Communist	Jacques Grenier	88	0.18	-0.06
Total valid votes		47,715	100.00	

1979 Canadian federal election
Party	Candidate	Votes	%	±%
Liberal	Yves Demers	35,270	68.13	+8.58
Social Credit	François Chagnon	7,446	14.38	+2.79
Progressive Conservative	Richard B. Morin	4,152	8.02	-13.24
New Democratic	John Shatilla	2,839	5.48	-2.12
Rhinoceros	Pierre J. Hamel	1,592	3.08	–
Union populaire	Marcel Lavigne	220	0.42	–
Communist	Jacques Grenier	125	0.24	–
Marxist–Leninist	Sylvie Bourgeois	122	0.24	–
Total valid votes		51,766	100.00	

1974 Canadian federal election
Party	Candidate	Votes	%	±%
Liberal	Yves Demers	25,674	59.55	+9.80
Progressive Conservative	Gilles David	9,165	21.26	+4.10
Social Credit	Émilien Martel	4,996	11.59	-9.26
New Democratic	Edmond Ciccarelli	3,275	7.60	-4.64
Total valid votes		43,110	100.00	

1972 Canadian federal election
Party	Candidate	Votes	%	±%
Liberal	Yves Demers	23,050	49.75	-0.79
Social Credit	Émilien Martel	9,659	20.85	+18.13
Progressive Conservative	Bernard Roy	7,950	17.16	+14.27
New Democratic	Gaston McKenty	5,669	12.24	-31.61
Total valid votes		46,328	100.00	

1968 Canadian federal election
Party	Candidate	Votes	%
Liberal	Eric Kierans	18,701	50.54
New Democratic	Robert Cliche	16,225	43.85
Progressive Conservative	Simon Bédard	1,068	2.89
Ralliement créditiste	Fernand Bélisle	1,006	2.72
Total valid votes		37,000	100.00

== See also ==
- List of Canadian electoral districts
- Historical federal electoral districts of Canada
