= Maud Debien =

Canadian politician (born 1938)

Maud Debien (born 29 May 1938 in Quebec City, Quebec) is a retired Canadian politician who served as a member of the House of Commons of Canada from 1993 to 2000. Her career has been in education.

She was elected in the Laval East electoral district under the Bloc Québécois party in the 1993 and 1997 federal elections, thus serving in the 35th and 36th Canadian Parliaments. Debien left Canadian politics in 2000 as she did not seek a third term in that year's federal election.
