= Gouzenko Affair =

Revelation of a Soviet spy ring in Canada

- Part of the Cold War in Canada
- Front page of The Gazette from February 18, 1946
- Date: 1945–1946
- Arrests: 21
- Convicted: 11

The Gouzenko Affair was the name given to events in Canada surrounding the defection of Igor Gouzenko, a GRU cipher clerk stationed at the Soviet Embassy in Ottawa, from the Soviet Union in 1945 and his allegations regarding the existence of a Soviet spy ring of Canadian communists. Gouzenko's defection and revelations are considered by historians to have marked the beginning of the Cold War in Canada, as well as potentially setting the stage for the "Red Scare" of the 1950s.

The Kellock–Taschereau Commission was a royal commission that began in February 1946 with the mandate to investigate the veracity of Gouzenko's information. The Commission, appointed on February 5, 1946, by Governor General the Earl of Athlone, on the advice of Prime Minister William Lyon Mackenzie King, was headed by two judges of the Supreme Court of Canada: Robert Taschereau and Roy Kellock. The investigations led to the arrest of 21 people, along with 11 convictions. Among them was the Labor-Progressive Party (LPP) member of Parliament for Cartier, Fred Rose. Other notable people among those accused of passing over secrets were Canadian Army Captain Gordon Lunan, and Sam Carr, a senior organizer of the LPP.

Filling 6,000 pages, Gouzenko's testimony was not made public until 1981.

== Background ==
Prior to the Second World War, the Soviet Union had no diplomatic representation in Canada. However, with the German invasion of the Soviet Union, the two countries suddenly found themselves allies fighting a common enemy. Stories of the Soviets' struggle against Nazi Germany elicited sympathy for the Soviet cause. Organizations began sending aid to the Soviet Union and a number of Soviet-Canadian friendship societies were formed throughout the country, pushing for greater Canadian-Soviet co-operation. In 1943, the Canadian-Soviet Friendship League held its inaugural rally at Maple Leaf Gardens with Prime Minister William Lyon Mackenzie King as its chair.

Public disdain for communism was also tempered by the events of the war. The early years of the war had seen extensive surveillance and arrests of trade unionists and suspected communists. However, as the war progressed, many left-wing groups, who had become disillusioned with the Soviet Union following the signing of the Molotov–Ribbentrop Pact, took a renewed interest in communism. The Communist Party of Canada (CPC), which had been banned in 1940 under the Defence of Canada Regulations of the War Measures Act, found itself newly legitimized and formed the Labor-Progressive Party (LPP), which would go on to receive more than 100,000 votes in the 1945 federal election.

In February 1942, Canada and the Soviet Union reached an agreement to establish diplomatic relations. Later that year, the Soviet Union established a legation in Ottawa headed by ambassador Fedor Gusev. However, this relationship was based on the need for expediency, not trust, and the Canadian government remained immensely distrustful of the Soviet Union, regardless of public support for the Soviet war effort. The Allies had technically agreed to a free exchange of information on the development of new weapons but, in practice, this agreement was not followed. In particular, the Soviet Union had been left out of the Manhattan Project.

=== Espionage ===
As the Eastern Front turned in the Soviet Union's favour, the Soviet leader, Joseph Stalin, became convinced that the Western powers would soon return to their pre-war hostility toward the Soviet Union. He was determined to take advantage of their preoccupation with the war and infiltrate what he considered to be his future adversaries.

Canada was a prime target for foreign espionage, as the country possessed an abundance of information that would have been valuable to the Soviet Union. Canadian diplomats had close ties with officials in the United States and the United Kingdom. The Canadian Armed Forces had access to American and British weapon systems. Scientists at Canada's National Research Council (NRC) were closely involved with British and American scientists in the development of radar technology, code-breaking, and the explosive RDX. Most notably, the NRC was engaged in atomic fission research at its Montreal Laboratory.

Canada also lacked effective security measures and, unlike the United States or the United Kingdom, it did not have the resources to mount effective counterintelligence operations. By the later years of the war, RCMP resources were spread thin guarding military installations and it was unable to provide effective screening for new hires within the rapidly expanding public service. Furthermore, NRC scientists tended to see security measures as arbitrary and often ignored them entirely.

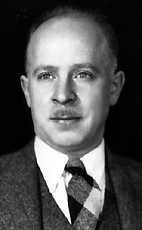
Fred Rose c. 1943-1946

One of the first Soviets to arrive at the Embassy in Ottawa was Major Vsevolod Sokolov, an agent of the Main Intelligence Directorate (GRU), the Soviet Union's foreign military intelligence agency. He set up a GRU spy ring, expanding upon the existing infrastructure of the CPC. Fred Rose, a union organizer and frequently jailed communist activist who would go on to become a member of Parliament under the LLP banner, reportedly approached Sokolov sometime in 1942 and expressed interest in working for the GRU. Together, Rose and Sam Carr, a national organizer for the CPC, actively helped the Soviets whenever possible and served as go-betweens for recruits, as Sokolov was leery of contacting agents directly. Both men were actively involved in Marxist study groups in Montreal, Toronto, and Ottawa and, as such, had a broad array of connections with civil servants, academics, and scientists with sympathies to the Soviet Union. In August 1943, when Rose was elected to Parliament, Pavel Mikhailov, a GRU rezident based in New York who oversaw GRU activities in North America, wrote in a message to GRU headquarters in Moscow, "Fred, our man in LESOVIA [code name for Canada], has been elected to the LESOVIAN parliament."

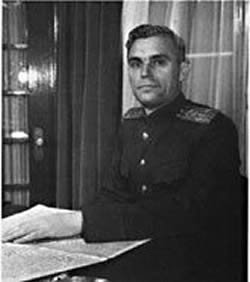
Colonel Nicholai Zabotin in 1944

In June 1943, Colonel Nicholai Zabotin arrived as the military attaché to the Embassy. Officially, he was charged with facilitating the delivery of military technology to the Soviet Union. Covertly, however, he took charge of the GRU's intelligence operations in Canada. Code-named "Grant", he was tasked with gathering information about radar technology, explosives, and, in particular, the atomic bomb. He was also instructed to recruit Canadian researchers and civil servants who would provide information during and after the war.

Zabotin was considerably less cautious than Sokolov. He opted to have Embassy staff deal with agents directly rather than through intermediaries. He also struck up an affair with a Russian immigrant in Montreal named Nina Farmer. As an expatriate, she would have been considered a traitor and, had Soviet authorities discovered the affair, Zabotin most likely would have been recalled. Zabotin largely delegated management of the individual operatives to his subordinates: Lieutenant Colonel Petr Motinov, Major Vasili Rogov, and Sokolov.

The GRU was not the only Soviet intelligence agency operating in Ottawa. The People's Commissariat for Internal Affairs (NKVD), the Soviet secret police and precursor to the KGB, also operated out of the Embassy, headed by Vitali Pavlov, who had arrived in Ottawa in 1942 when the legation was initially established. Additionally, Soviet naval intelligence may also have been operating out of the Embassy. However, the GRU and the NKVD did not share resources or intelligence and their relationship was highly dysfunctional. Infighting was frequent as the two agencies competed for informants. Staff would frequently undermine each other by reporting even minor infractions to Moscow. Responsibility for Embassy staff technically fell to Pavlov, although he and Zabotin rarely spoke to each other.

==== The Lunan cell ====
Some of the Canadians recruited by the GRU were charged with managing the activities of other agents. One of these individuals was Gordon Lunan, an officer with the Wartime Information Board who served as an editor for Canadian Affairs, a military journal written for members of the armed forces serving overseas. Lunan was recruited by Rose in March 1945 and his career in journalism offered him cover for recruiting informants, some of whom were led to believe they were speaking to him in his capacity as editor of Canadian Affairs. Of Zabotin's subordinates, Rogov had the most demanding job, as he managed the Lunan cell.

Lunan (to whom the GRU had assigned the code name, "Back") was tasked with recruiting and managing two NRC engineers: Edward Mazerall (code-named "Bagley") and Durnford Smith (code-named "Badeau"), as well as Israel Halperin (code-named "Bacon"), a mathematics professor at Queen's University who had taken leave to serve in the Canadian Artillery during the war. Smith was the most productive of Lunan's sources and, from March to August 1945, he passed 17 reports on radar systems, totalling about 700 pages.

Mazerall was a far more reluctant accomplice. In late July 1945, Lunan approached Mazerall under the guise that the editor of an army newspaper was looking for information on developments in radar technology. Mazerall gave him two documents marked "confidential" – a research proposal and a paper on air navigation that was set to be presented at an upcoming symposium in London, which the Soviets would be attending.

Likewise, Halperin proved to be of limited use to the Soviets. Although he met with Lunan several times, he supplied him only with verbal information on the capacity of Canadian explosives plants, information that was already publicly available. Lunan continued to press Halperin for more information, but Halperin continually refused. Halperin eventually cut off contact with Lunan entirely.

==== Other notable agents ====
Zabotin's most valuable agent was Alan Nunn May, a British nuclear physicist who worked at the Montreal Laboratory under the United Kingdom's Tube Alloys project. Nunn May had been passing on information regarding his work on uranium as early as 1942, when he still worked in the United Kingdom. However, the GRU did not inform Zabotin about Nunn May until May 1945, nearly two years after Nunn May arrived in Canada. Zabotin promptly dispatched Lieutenant Pavel Angelov to make contact. Nunn May was initially reluctant to provide the Soviets with further aid, as he feared he was under RCMP surveillance, but ultimately agreed to co-operate. He was tasked with obtaining secret information on nuclear technology from the Montreal and Chicago laboratories, which he visited several times in 1944 and 1945.

Nunn May was ultimately able to supply the Soviets with samples of uranium. Embassy staff, unfamiliar with the hazardous effects of radiation, stored it unconcernedly in an office safe for two weeks. Motinov then delivered the sample to Moscow, storing it under his waistband. The uranium sample reportedly left him with a painful wound and he required regular blood transfusions for the rest of his life.

Another notable agent was Raymond Boyer, an assistant professor of chemistry at McGill University who worked with the NRC and served as the secretary of the Canadian-American RDX Committee. Boyer was recruited by Rose in February 1943. The United States had vetoed an Allied initiative to share information on RDX with the Soviet Union; however, throughout 1943 and 1944, Boyer provided the Soviets with classified information on a number of chemical compounds, including RDX.

Other scientists with communist leanings that had piqued the attention of the GRU were David Shugar, a sonar specialist with the Royal Canadian Navy (RCN), and Matt Nightingale, a Royal Canadian Air Force (RCAF) engineer with knowledge of LORAN navigation systems. These men were considered valuable not only for the information they had access to in Canada, but also because they had access to secret research in the United Kingdom and the United States.

=== Igor Gouzenko ===
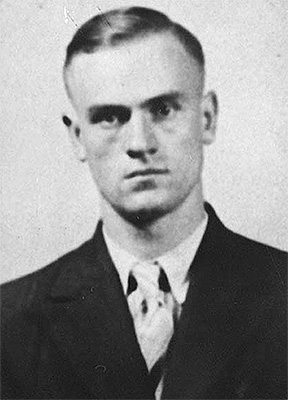
Igor Gouzenko in 1946

Igor Gouzenko was born in 1919 in the village of Rogachev near Moscow. He excelled academically and was accepted to the Moscow Architectural Institute where he met Svetlana "Anna" Gouseva, whom he quickly married. His architectural studies were brought to an abrupt end with the onset of the war and he was drafted into the military. However, rather than be sent to the front lines, he was selected by the NKVD for a special assignment. He studied at the Military Engineering Academy in Moscow and, later, the Higher Intelligence School of the Red Army. There, through an intensive ten-month course, he trained as a cipher specialist. He attained the rank of lieutenant.

In April 1942, Gouzenko was assigned to GRU headquarters in Moscow where he worked as a cipher clerk. In June 1943, Gouzenko, then 23, accompanied Zabotin to Ottawa, arriving on June 25. He worked at the Soviet Embassy where he was responsible for coding and decoding messages between Zabotin and GRU headquarters in Moscow. He passed along whatever information Zabotin produced through his spy network. Keeping track of code names proved exceptionally tedious, as some agents were given multiple aliases and, in many cases, Gouzenko did not know their identity. He worked exclusively for the GRU, as the NKVD had its own cipher clerk.

Gouzenko had arrived in Ottawa during a housing crisis brought about by a combination of the Great Depression and a wartime construction lag, so he initially stayed at the Château Laurier. His salary was CA$275 per month, a staggering sum for that era, which afforded him a degree of comfort and luxury to which he was unaccustomed. Anna, who was pregnant with their first child, joined Gouzenko in Ottawa in October and she gave birth to a son, Andrei, shortly thereafter. Embassy rules dictated that Embassy staff were to live in the same buildings so that they could all monitor each other. However, Zabotin's wife found Andrei's persistent crying intolerable so Gouzenko and his family were given special permission to rent a separate apartment on Somerset Street West. Gouzenko later recalled, "I heard Zabotin remark more than once that living abroad spoiled some Russians. It had certainly spoiled Anna and me. In Ottawa we had a comfortable apartment of our own. In Moscow a place that size would have been shared by four or five families."

According to his memoir, although he had been carefully screened by the NKVD for his political reliability, Gouzenko quickly developed an affection for Canada and began to grow disillusioned with the Soviet Union soon after his arrival. The freedoms and standards of living he enjoyed in Canada drastically outstripped what he experienced in his home country. Canadians could move freely without the constant threat of police surveillance and could openly criticize their government without fear of reprisal. He found Canadians to be warm and inviting and even conversed with police officers, whom he found friendly and approachable, something that would have been unheard of in the Soviet Union.

==== Recall to Soviet Union ====
In September 1944, Gouzenko learned that he was being recalled to the Soviet Union, just 14 months in to what was originally supposed to be a three-year tour of duty. No explanation was given for the sudden change in plans. Transfers to and from Soviet postings abroad were not uncommon, as the Soviet government was leery of their staff developing ties to the countries to which they were assigned. However, a recall could also have meant his loyalty had been called into question, meaning he could be sent to a labour camp or face execution and he had no way of knowing whether he would be reassigned or shot upon his return. In 1939, Lavrentiy Beria, the newly appointed head of the NKVD, had large numbers of Soviet operatives imprisoned or executed in order to purge any lingering influence of his predecessor.

However, Gouzenko had not, in fact, fallen into disfavour with the GRU. Unknown to Gouzenko, Colonel Miklahil Mil'shtein, a GRU official who had been tasked with inspecting the Soviet diplomatic missions in North America in the summer of 1944, had grown uncomfortable with Gouzenko's capacity to compromise Soviet espionage activities. In addition to routinely handling secret messages between Moscow and the Embassy, Gouzenko had an unusual degree of access to classified documents, including access to a safe in one of the cipher rooms. Furthermore, Gouzenko's separate living arrangements meant he lived outside the supervision of other Embassy staff. Mil'shtein reported his concerns to the GRU leadership who, out of an abundance of caution, issued the recall.

In any case, Zabotin was able to postpone Gouzenko's departure by insisting he could not be spared until a replacement was found and trained. Gouzenko knew his departure could not be delayed indefinitely and, sometime in September 1944, he and his wife discussed the idea of defecting. However, he suspected the Canadian government would be reluctant to endanger its relations with the Soviet Union by giving asylum to a Soviet citizen who had committed treason and set about gathering information that could be of interest to his prospective hosts. Gouzenko planned to steal documents from the Embassy and take them to the editor of the Ottawa Journal, reasoning that the best way to get public attention quickly was to go through the media. He hoped the public attention would shield him from being killed by Soviet agents. He was reluctant to approach Canadian law enforcement directly, as, although he was confident the GRU had not infiltrated the RCMP, he had no way of knowing whether the NKVD had its own agents there.

Gouzenko's replacement – Lieutenant Kulakov – arrived in July 1945. Gouzenko's time was quickly running out, but he did not yet feel he was in a position to barter with Canadian officials. The full extent of the Soviet Union's espionage activities within Canada is not known since Russian records remain classified. However, it appears the GRU had limited success in obtaining secret information. Canadian scientists played only a peripheral role in American nuclear research. Furthermore, Embassy staff were more interested in enjoying the luxuries and high standards of living of the West. Staff would exaggerate the value of whatever information they were able to pass on to Moscow, much of which was already publicly available or too vague to be of consequence. Gouzenko repeatedly put off his defection in hopes of coming across something more valuable.

Gouzenko was not scheduled to leave until sometime in October; however, in early September, he learned that Kulakov was scheduled to take over his responsibilities on Thursday, September 6 and, as of that date, he would no longer have access to the secret material stored in the coding room. Furthermore, with his primary responsibilities lifted, he would no longer have an excuse to enter the Embassy after hours. He had decided to defect on a Wednesday, since Zabotin had regular offsite meetings on Thursday so any missing documents would not be noticed until later in the day, and September 5 was his only remaining Wednesday.

== Gouzenko's defection ==
=== September 5, 1945 ===
Much of the story of Gouzenko's defection is steeped in myth and there are contradictions within some of his claims. The popular story is that Gouzenko had been subtly marking secret documents for weeks by folding their corners and, on the evening of September 5, 1945, he entered the Embassy, stuffed 109 documents in his pockets and under his clothes, and left the building. The documents included telegrams between Zabotin and GRU headquarters, pages from Zabotin's personal notebook, and information on allied weapons systems, including the atomic bomb. However, the weather that day was unusually warm and Gouzenko would have been lightly dressed. It is doubtful he could have hidden 109 documents – totalling roughly 250 pages – under his clothes without appearing conspicuous. Furthermore, marking the documents would have run the risk of detection in an environment where security violations could lead to execution. When he was later questioned, he acknowledged that he had been smuggling documents out of the Embassy for weeks leading up to his defection.

At approximately 9:00 pm, Gouzenko arrived at the office of the Ottawa Journal. Chester Frowde, the night editor, had trouble deciphering Gouzenko's thick Russian accent and could understand little of what he was saying. Gouzenko's frantic state made communication even more difficult. Gouzenko kept repeating in a barely intelligible voice, "It's war. It's war. It's Russia." After ten minutes, Frowde abandoned hope of making sense of the situation and directed Gouzenko to the RCMP headquarters nearby. Gouzenko, still worried the NKVD had infiltrated the RCMP, instead headed to the Department of Justice building on Wellington Street. However, the building was closed for the night and a security guard there advised him to return the following morning. With his options exhausted for the time being, Gouzenko returned to his apartment on Somerset Street West.

=== September 6, 1945 ===
The following morning, September 6, Gouzenko headed directly to the Department of Justice where he asked to speak with the minister, Louis St. Laurent. He brought Anna and Andrei along, reasoning that a family seeking aid would seem more credible than a lone agent peddling stolen documents. Furthermore, he knew Embassy staff would soon discover the missing documents and, if his family were taken into custody by NKVD operatives, he would have no choice but to surrender himself.

When the ministry building opened at 9:00 am, the family met briefly with a secretary. Communication was slow, as Gouzenko spoke in a thick Russian accent and Anna spoke no English at all. The secretary left the room to make a phone call and, when she returned, she instructed them to go to Parliament Hill where they could meet directly with St. Laurent. However, upon their arrival, they were told to return to the Department of Justice building and await the minister's return. They waited for two hours and, at one point, Gouzenko attempted to elicit attention by threatening to kill himself, but to no avail. Eventually, the family was told that the minister was not available.

From Gouzenko's perspective, he had been dismissed with an almost comical degree of disinterest. Unknown to Gouzenko, however, King had been made aware of his defection. The RCMP had learned of Gouzenko's visit to the Ottawa Journal the night before and the head of the RCMP intelligence branch, Charles Rivett-Carnac, had briefed Norman Robertson, undersecretary for external affairs and King's close advisor, that morning. At around 10:45 am, King arrived in his office to find Robertson and his assistant, Hume Wrong, waiting for him. According to King's diary, Robertson told him that a "terrible thing" had happened. They told him that someone from the Soviet Embassy had evidence of a Soviet-run spy network in Canada and the United States. However, King was hesitant to risk a diplomatic incident, particularly given that the first session of the Council of Foreign Ministers was scheduled to begin in London on September 11 and a scandal could upset negotiations. King was also suspicious of Gouzenko's motives and told Robertson and Wrong that he would not get involved in the matter. He wrote in his diary:

I said to both Robertson and Wrong that I thought we should be extremely careful in becoming a party to any course of action which would link the govt. of Canada up with this matter in a manner which might cause Russia to feel that we had performed an unfriendly act. That to seek to gather information in any underhanded way would make clear that we did not trust the Embassy.

Gouzenko's defection was also ill-timed. September 6 was the first peacetime opening of Parliament since the 1930s. The governor general, the Earl of Athlone, was scheduled to deliver his final throne speech before retirement. There were crowds of people filling the streets awaiting the parade of military bands and the arrival of the governor general and Princess Alice.

Nevertheless, the RCMP decided to follow Gouzenko's movements to ascertain whether his revelations were genuine. King also authorized the RCMP to attempt to seize Gouzenko's documents if he were to commit suicide.

After leaving the Department of Justice, Gouzenko decided to return to the Ottawa Journal. When he arrived with his family, however, the editor declined to meet with him and he spoke instead with Leslie Johnstone, a reporter. Johnstone listened as Gouzenko translated some of the documents, which she then took to the editor. However, she returned quickly and told Gouzenko that they were not interested in the story, and suggested that Gouzenko go to the RCMP's Bureau of Naturalization to apply for Canadian citizenship. Dejected and still leery of dealing with the RCMP, Gouzenko returned to the Department of Justice where he was told they did not deal with immigration and to try the Canadian Crown Attorney's Office on Nicholas Street instead.

Gouzenko and his family arrived at the Crown Attorney's Office at around 2:00 pm, but they were told the immigration process could take months. By chance, they encountered Fernande Coulson (née Joubarne), a secretary with several contacts in the media, the RCMP, and the federal government, who took their story seriously. She called over an acquaintance from the Ottawa Journal who looked through Gouzenko's documents and confirmed they appeared genuine. However, he insisted there was nothing he could do considering the editorial staff had already turned Gouzenko away. Coulson contacted the RCMP, who dispatched an officer; however, the officer quickly declined to get involved, informing her that King had issued orders to ignore Gouzenko. Coulson then called the Prime Minister's secretary who promptly advised her to turn Gouzenko away. She called Le Droit, a French-language newspaper, but got nowhere. Finally, she reached out to another contact at the RCMP, an inspector named John Leopold, who reluctantly agreed to meet with Gouzenko in his office in the Confederation Building on Wellington Street at 9:30 am the following day.

For the second night in a row, Gouzenko was out of options and he had no choice but to return to his apartment with his family. Gouzenko and his wife left Andrei with their neighbour, Harold Main, a corporal with the RCAF. However, the Mains could overhear the panicked tones in their voices through the walls and deduced that the Gouzenkos were in some form of trouble. Gouzenko explained the situation. Main decided to contact the local police but, since Gouzenko was worried the building's phone lines might be tapped, he set out on bicycle. While he was gone, another neighbour, Frances Elliott, who had overheard their conversation, offered the exhausted Gouzenkos refuge in her apartment for the night. Main returned with two Ottawa constables. The officers listened to Gouzenko's story and, as Main later noted, they seemed as if they already knew of Gouzenko's situation. The officers said there was nothing they could do, but agreed to patrol the neighbourhood during the night.

Meanwhile, the RCMP was maintaining its surveillance and had stationed officers in Dundonald Park across the street from Gouzenko's apartment building. The details of Gouzenko's movements had been filtering back to Robertson throughout the day and, that evening, he consulted an "eminent officer of the British Secret Service."

=== September 7, 1945 ===
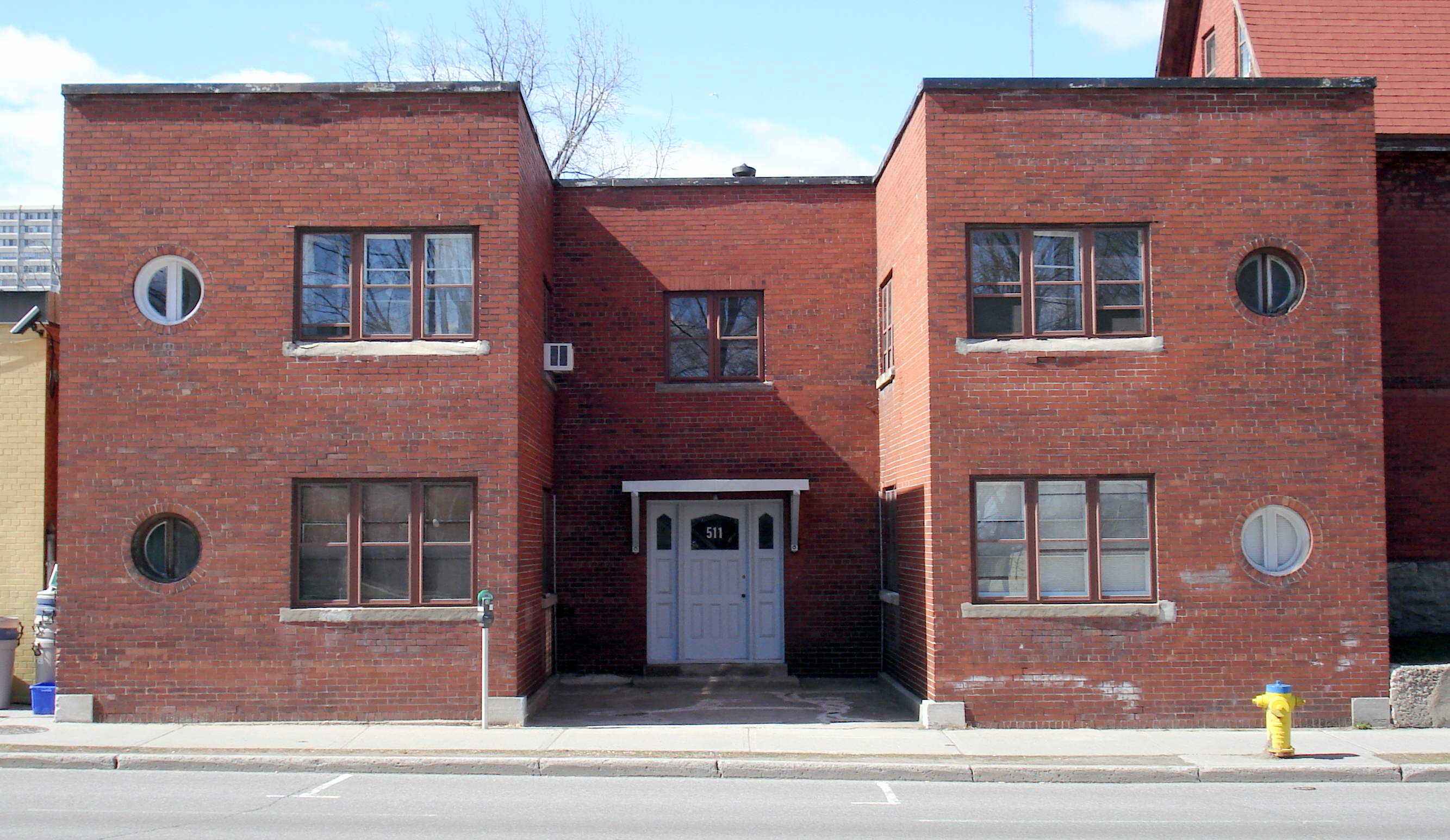
Gouzenko's apartment on Somerset Street West (upper right, facing street) in 2007

Gouzenko's disappearance had not gone unnoticed at the Embassy. The previous morning, Zabotin had informed Pavlov that Gouzenko and a number of important documents were missing. Shortly after midnight, Pavlov dispatched a driver to Gouzenko's now vacant home. He pounded on Gouzenko's door for some time, but left when he did not get an answer. Undeterred, Pavlov led a group of four men to Gouzenko's home a few hours later, forced the door open with a crowbar, and began ransacking the apartment. As the Gouzenkos watched the scene unfold through a keyhole in her door, Elliott called the police. Two officers arrived and confronted Pavlov and his team. Pavlov at first insisted he and his team had a key and permission to enter the apartment, a story that quickly fell apart when the officers noted the broken lock. An argument over jurisdiction ensued, but the four men eventually left. The police did not attempt to detain them.

That morning, Robertson ordered the RCMP to take Gouzenko and his family into custody. How Robertson came to this decision is unclear. The popular belief is that the "eminent officer" with whom he had met the night before was William Stephenson, the British Security Co-ordination Chief and spymaster who, by coincidence, had made a rare visit to Canada and was staying at the Château Montebello, not far from Ottawa, and persuaded Robertson to intervene. However, excerpts from King's diary, as well as an interview with one of Robertson's deputies, raise questions as to whether Stephenson was in Ottawa at the time.

Whatever Robertson's motivation, Gouzenko was taken to RCMP headquarters where he was debriefed by Rivett-Carnac and Leopold, who spoke some Russian. The RCMP ordered Gouzenko's neighbours to keep the matter a secret. Gouzenko's interview progressed slowly at first, as his panicked state limited his ability to communicate effectively. According to an RCMP report:

Gouzenko was in a highly agitated and emotionally disturbed state. In fact, he appeared close to a nervous collapse. Because of this condition his speech was rather incoherent and his train of thought and expression were confused to the point of being extremely difficult to comprehend... these Headquarters were convinced from Gouzenko's actions and temporary mental instability that the weight of his precarious position would have driven him to the murder of his wife and final suicide.

Nevertheless, the information the RCMP was able to obtain was enough to prompt them into action and Gouzenko and his family were taken to a safehouse outside Ottawa. Gouzenko's documents revealed that the GRU had been successful in obtaining secret information on weapons, radar, high-level political discussions, and atomic research. A list of code names provided by Gouzenko suggested the GRU had as many as 26 agents, including 18 Canadians. Moreover, the documents revealed that the suspects were not professional spies but, rather, ordinary citizens with communist sympathies. Robertson, who would monitor the transcripts of Gouzenko's interviews and provide the prime minister with regular updates, reported to King: "Everything is much worse than we would have believed... [The documents] disclose an espionage system on a large scale... things came right into our country to a degree we could not have believed possible."

== Investigation ==
Gouzenko's defection remained a tightly guarded secret throughout the rest of 1945 and only a select few government officials were aware of the investigation. King formed a small working group that included Robertson, Rivett-Carnac, St. Laurent, and Wrong, while the RCMP established its own task force under the Intelligence Branch, which included inspectors M.E. Anthony and Clifford Harvison. However, the RCMP was ill-equipped to deal with defectors and they immediately notified British and American authorities of Gouzenko's defection. Both countries quickly dispatched representatives to assist with the investigation, including Roger Hollis from MI5, Peter Dwyer and John-Paul Evans from MI6, and Lish Whitson from the FBI. Due to security concerns, as well as Gouzenko's fragile mental state, only a handful of investigators were permitted access to Gouzenko, including Hollis and Whitson. Dwyer and Evans did not speak to Gouzenko directly and, instead, forwarded questions through Leopold.

Gouzenko's documents included three GRU dossiers on agents in Canada, 33 telegrams between the Embassy and Moscow, and various notes written by Zabotin and Rogov, many of which were handwritten in shorthand. Also included was a mailing list that would later prove to be a key piece of evidence against many of the suspects. All in all, the documents showed conclusively that the Soviets maintained a large-scale spy network in Canada that extended into the civil service, the military, and the NRC. Even King's own ministry (Note: King served a dual role as both Prime Minister and Secretary of State for External Affairs.) appeared to have been compromised; Emma Woikin, a young cipher clerk who worked for the department of Department of External Affairs had been named by Gouzenko.

However, Gouzenko's documents revealed little about what material had actually been passed on to the Soviets, meaning it would be extremely difficult to pursue charges against the alleged spies. Furthermore, Gouzenko had never met any of the suspected spies and his knowledge of the suspects came exclusively from messages he had encoded, which was, by definition, hearsay. In addition, given that he worked for the GRU, Gouzenko was technically a co-conspirator and his testimony would likely not hold up in court. The RCMP began to seek out additional evidence against the accused. Eleven of the suspects were put under surveillance. Samples of the stationery used in their workplaces were compared to those supplied by Gouzenko. Handwriting samples were collected and compared with those in Gouzenko's documents, which linked Lunan, Smith, Woikin, and Harold Gerson, a geological engineer with the Department of Munitions and Supply, to the documents.

=== Soviet response ===
On September 7, the Soviet Embassy sent a letter to External Affairs, requesting that Canadian authorities find and arrest Gouzenko, claiming he had stolen money. The letter also complained about the "rude treatment" Pavlov and his men had received at Gouzenko's home the night before. Four days later, Robertson wrote to Georgy Zarubin, the Soviet Ambassador, apologizing for the behaviour of the local authorities and offering assurances that every effort would be made to find Gouzenko. As part of the deception, the RCMP commissioner put out a phony, nationwide bulletin to its offices across Canada with a description of Gouzenko and his family.

A number of other precautions were also taken to conceal the investigation. External Affairs and the British Commission left their cipher codes unchanged for several months – knowing they may have been compromised – so as not to arouse suspicion. Communications regarding Gouzenko were sent through a separate system designed by Stephenson. Suspects who had access to secret information were quietly moved to other departments. Woikin, for example, remained at External Affairs but was transferred – without explanation – away from the cipher division to the agency's passport division, where she no longer had access to secret information.

However, the subterfuge was ultimately in vain, as the Soviets quickly learned that Gouzenko was in Canadian custody through Kim Philby, a Soviet spy who worked in British intelligence. At the time, Philby was chief of counterintelligence at MI6 and, as such, he had access to the reports related to the Gouzenko case, including those submitted by Dwyer and Hollis. Nevertheless, the Soviets took no action, as they did not want to run the risk of either exposing Philby or publicizing Gouzenko's defection.

=== Camp X ===
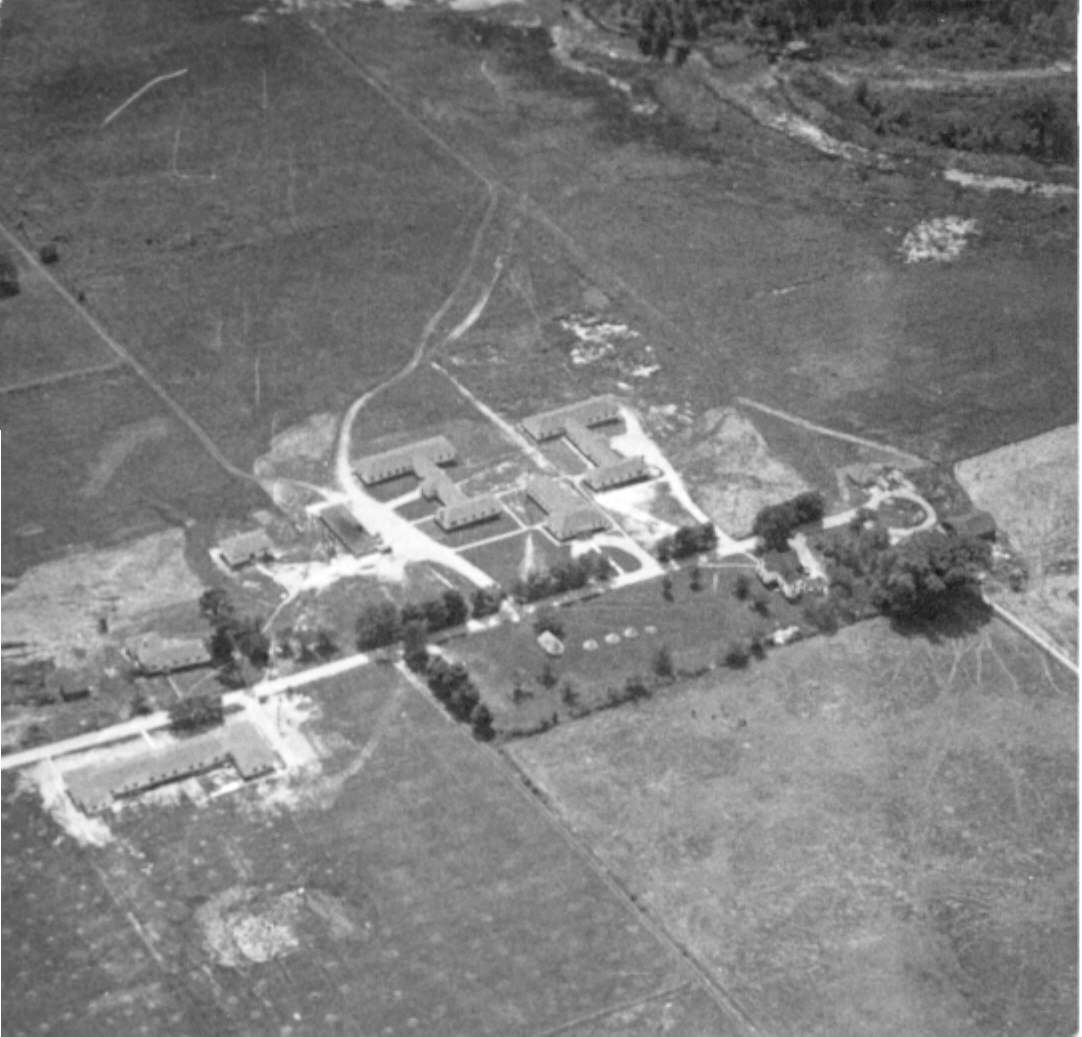
Camp X in 1943

For several weeks following Gouzenko's defection, he and his family were shuffled between vacation cabins on a lake approximately an hour's drive from Ottawa. In early October, the family was moved to a three-bedroom cottage on Otter Lake near Smiths Falls. A few weeks later, they were transferred to Camp X, a top-secret spy training school near Whitby, Ontario. The facility was closed for the season, but featured a wire fence perimeter, which made it an optimal location from a security standpoint.

The RCMP assigned Gouzenko the code name "Corby." The name had been suggested by Robertson who, in order to protect sensitive documents, kept papers related to the Gouzenko affair in a box in his desk drawer. The box had originally contained a bottle of Corby rye whisky. Going forward, "the Corby Case" was used as a code name for the Gouzenko Affair.

Anna would give birth to a girl, Evelyn, in December. Gouzenko would not be present during her birth, as the RCMP feared the Soviets, aware of Anna's pregnancy, would be monitoring Canada's hospitals. Instead, she would be accompanied by Mervyn Black, who had served as Whitson's interpreter. Black would pose as Anna's husband, playing the part of a farmhand who spoke little English, so as to elicit as few questions as possible.

=== P.C. 6444 ===
A key challenge for the investigators was keeping suspects oblivious to the investigation itself. The most imminent concern was Nunn May, who was considered to be the most important suspect given that he had shared information regarding the atomic bomb with the Soviets. Furthermore, Nunn May was scheduled to return to London on September 15 to take up a position at King's College London. On September 10, Athlone, on the advice of King, issued a special order-in-Council under the War Measures Act, authorizing the surveillance and, if necessary, detention of Nunn May. The Order was kept secret not only from the public, but from most of King's cabinet as well.

Nevertheless, Nunn May was permitted to return to London as planned and his case was quietly turned over to MI5, who kept him under surveillance. Canadian and British authorities were worried he may attempt to flee to the Soviet Union, but they determined they did not have enough evidence to prosecute him. The British in particular were anxious to arrest Nunn May, as they were hoping for greater access to American atomic research and, if a British nuclear scientist were permitted to escape to the Soviet Union, their credibility would be shattered.

Gouzenko's documents provided British authorities with a potential opportunity; they revealed that Nunn May intended to meet with a Soviet Contact outside the British Museum in London at 8:00 pm on October 7. Furthermore, the GRU had proposed two backup dates – October 17 and October 27 – in the event the initial rendezvous could not be made.

On September 29, King and Robertson flew to Washington and conferred with Harry Truman the following day. Truman was insistent that no action be taken with regard to the suspects, as he was concerned that exposing the Soviet espionage network could undermine talks about reaching an international agreement on the atomic bomb. The following day, October 1, King and Robertson boarded the Queen Mary bound for the United Kingdom.

While the two were en route, St. Laurent, who was serving as Canada's acting prime minister in King's absence, and evidently in anticipation of Nunn May's arrest, had the Governor General issue a second order-in-Council (P.C. 6444). P.C. 6444 effectively suspended habeas corpus and empowered authorities to detain, interrogate, and prosecute suspected communist spies, who could be held indefinitely.

=== Political delays ===
King and Robertson arrived in Southampton on October 7. King was met by Hollis, who immediately showed him a telegram from Lord Halifax in Washington, noting that Truman had agreed not to stand in the way of Nunn May's detention, "if immediate and imperative reasons of security required an arrest," but stipulated that, "if, as he hoped, these imperative reasons were not present he would greatly prefer that action should be deferred pending further consideration and discussion." King indicated that he agreed with Truman and would not object to Nunn May's arrest should he pose an imminent security risk, a message Hollis quickly relayed to London. However, that evening, Nunn May failed to make his scheduled rendezvous. King met with British Prime Minister Clement Attlee on October 11 and, in the end, the three leaders agreed to postpone the matter of Gouzenko entirely until mid-November, when the three men were scheduled to meet in Washington for talks on atomic energy.

Back in Canada, Gouzenko's debriefing was completed in November. In their final report, the RCMP noted that, "Gouzenko has been thoroughly and extensively interrogated. He has been questioned and cross-questioned in an effort to extract every last particle of information possible."

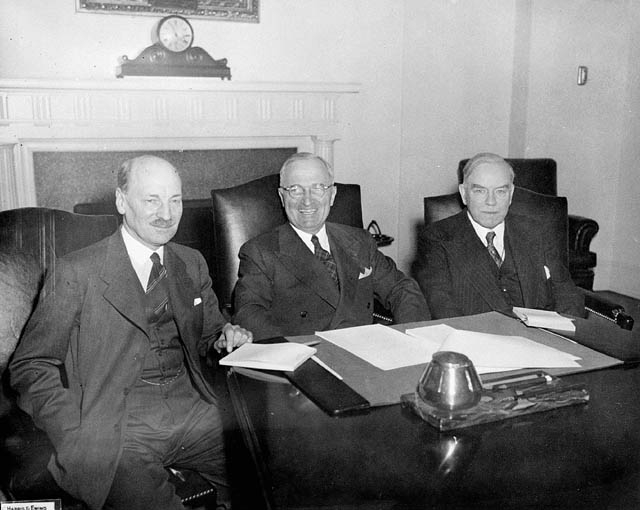
Clement Attlee, Harry Truman, and William Lyon Mackenzie King in Washington in November 1945

On November 14, Attlee, King, and Truman came to a tentative agreement to conduct simultaneous arrests of the suspects during the week of November 26. However, this plan was put on hold at the request of the FBI. Another Soviet agent, Elizabeth Bentley (code-named "Miss Corby"), had surrendered to the FBI on November 7 and the agency wanted more time to debrief her. However, as with Gouzenko, Philby was able to alert the Soviets to Bentley's defection. The Soviets promptly suspended their espionage activities in the United States and, consequently, the FBI's surveillance of the individuals identified by Bentley did not yield any actionable evidence. On November 27, when it was clear that they would not be able to act on Bentley's intelligence alone, the FBI notified Canadian authorities that they were free to move forward with arrests.

In the intervening time, however, King appeared to have re-evaluated his position and was now leaning toward a diplomatic solution. It was looking increasingly likely that Canada would be the only country making arrests and King was reluctant to act alone. Whereas Canada had the War Measures Act, the British and Americans needed evidence to back up their arrests. British authorities could not seem to come up with a definitive strategy for how to proceed with Nunn May. Meanwhile, one of the key American suspects, Ignacy Witczak, a GRU agent who had been living in California under a fake Canadian passport and likely establishing a spy network on the West Coast, near the Manhattan Project, had disappeared. Also, the FBI concluded that, for the time being, it did not have enough evidence to pursue charges against the other suspects based in the United States.

King was also faced with the possibility that most of the accused spies would be acquitted and he was loath to risk an international incident only to have the suspects walk free. The matter of Rose was also a delicate matter, as no sitting member of Parliament had been arrested since Louis Riel. In addition, the Soviet Union had cut contact with its agents in Canada following Gouzenko's defection and the suspects posed no immediate threat to Canadian security.

Instead, King proposed meeting with Zarubin and formally requesting the Soviet Union break off its espionage efforts and expel any Embassy staff who were suspected of spying. His plan also involved questioning suspected spies within the civil service using "departmental inquiries", rather than having them formally arrested. King's advisors were deeply opposed to his plan. Likewise, when British authorities learned of the plan, MI5 sent a telegram to the RCMP, advising that, "protest unaccompanied by prosecution... will be taken by Russians as indicative of weakness of evidence on which protest is based." Eager to prevent King from revealing the investigation to Zarubin, RCMP Commissioner Stuart Wood, Robertson, St. Laurent, and Wrong met with King on December 3, the day before he was scheduled to meet with Zarubin. At the meeting, Wood falsely claimed that there had been a sudden development in the Bentley case and that the FBI was seeking another postponement. King opted to await the results of the supposed FBI investigation.

On December 7, 1945, the government’s legal advisor, E.K. Williams, who would later go on to become Chief Justice of the Supreme Court of Manitoba, sent King a top-secret memorandum advising that the evidence provided by Gouzenko was sufficient to prosecute only the four suspects whose handwriting had been matched to Gouzenko's documents. He suggested the creation of a royal commission that would have "full control over its own procedure... It need not be bound by the ordinary rules of evidence if it considers it desirable to disregard them. It need not permit counsel to appear for those to be interrogated by or before it."

For the next two months, it appeared as though Gouzenko had been discreetly swept aside. Curiously, the entries in King's diary from November 10 to December 31 are missing, the only such gap in his decades-long political career. Many historians believe King may have intended to quietly drop the Gouzenko matter entirely. Indeed, for the month of January 1946, King's diary contains no mention of Gouzenko at all. Rather, King's attention appeared centred on the first session of the United Nations General Assembly, where Canada's Lester B. Pearson was considered a front-runner to become the first secretary-general.

== Kellock–Taschereau Commission ==
Any plans to bury the matter of Gouzenko's revelations came to an abrupt end on February 3, 1946, when Drew Pearson, an NBC Radio host, announced that a Soviet agent had surrendered to Canadian authorities and that Canada was quietly investigating a Soviet spy ring that extended into the United States government:

This is Drew Pearson with a flash from Washington. Canada's Prime Minister Mackenzie King has informed President Truman of a very serious situation affecting our relations with Russia. A Soviet agent surrendered some time ago to Canadian authorities and confessed a gigantic Russian espionage network inside the United States.

It is not known how Pearson learned of the defection, but the most likely source of the leak was J. Edgar Hoover, as it was not uncommon for the FBI to leak information about suspected communists to the press and the two men corresponded often. Furthermore, an internal FBI memorandum revealed that Hoover had spoken with Pearson by telephone earlier that day.

Following the broadcast, King contacted Williams for advice on the make-up of a royal commission. Williams suggested using judges from the Supreme Court, as they would give the commission the credibility that was so essential in such a sensitive matter. Two days later, on February 5, King informed his cabinet of Gouzenko for the first time. He denied that the timing of the investigation was related to Pearson's announcement and insisted that he had delayed acting on Gouzenko's information in order "to give the U.S. an opportunity to follow up the revelations that they had received."

That same day, King and Athlone hurriedly signed another order-in-Council (P.C. 411), this time appointing a royal commission chaired by Supreme Court Justices Roy Kellock and Robert Taschereau. The Kellock–Taschereau Commission (officially called the Royal Commission to Investigate the Facts Relating to and the Circumstances Surrounding the Communication, by Public Officials and Other Persons in Positions of Trust of Secret and Confidential Information to Agents of a Foreign Power) was charged with investigating Gouzenko’s information. Three lawyers were also appointed to the Commission: Williams; Gérald Fauteux, who would later be appointed to the Supreme Court himself; and D.W. Mundell. Another future Supreme Court appointee, John Robert Cartwright, was named clerk of the Commission.

The Commission first convened at the Seigniory Club in Montebello. There, on February 13, Gouzenko was sworn in and began to give his testimony. Black served as his interpreter, though Gouzenko insisted on muddling through in English. By the end of the second day, the Commission had the names of 15 suspected spies.

Soon after Gouzenko began delivering his testimony, the Commission decided that 14 of the 15 individuals identified by Gouzenko should be detained and isolated (the Commission was reluctant to detain Rose). On February 10, Pearson had again brought up the espionage case in his weekly radio broadcast and the Commission feared that the suspects might attempt to run. Indeed, Carr had already fled to the United States. In a February 13 memorandum to MI6, Dwyer noted that, "Royal Commissioners suddenly decided today to prevent any further damage by leaks from Drew Pearson by taking action before his next Sunday broadcast."

Most of the alleged spies resided in Ottawa or Montreal. However, Lunan was stationed in London as a speech writer for Paul Martin Sr. On February 13, Lunan was sent a cable recalling him to Canada under the pretense that he was being promoted. Lunan was scheduled to arrive at Montreal's Dorval Airport on February 15 so it was that date that was selected for rounding up the suspected spies.

=== Detentions and interrogations ===
Early on the morning of February 15, ten days after the Commission was established, the RCMP launched a series of simultaneous raids and detained (Note: The suspects were "detained" and not "arrested." Since no formal charges were being laid, the usual warnings about self-incrimination were not required.) 11 suspected spies. The raids were originally scheduled for 3:00 am, but King intervened and had the raids pushed back to 6:00 am, a move that would prove fortunate when one of the squads initially raided the wrong apartment. RCMP narcotics agents were used since the Intelligence Branch of the RCMP did not have the resources to carry out the raids on its own. Hours later, King held a press conference in Ottawa and made his first public statement regarding the Gouzenko Affair. His statement was brief – just 250 words – and he did not mention Gouzenko or the Soviet Union; rather, he said only that secret information had been disclosed to a foreign government, that several people had been detained, and that a royal commission had been established. The following day, February 16, two additional suspects were rounded up, bringing the total number of detainees to 13.

Despite King's ambiguity, the press quickly deduced that the foreign power was the Soviet Union. Details of the story made the front pages in newspapers throughout the West. Many outlets published stories that were either speculative or wildly exaggerated. The Globe and Mail declared in its banner headline that "the atom secret" had been leaked to the Soviets. In Pearson's following broadcast on February 17, he claimed that the unnamed Soviet spy had provided Canadian authorities with the names of at least 1,700 agents operating in Canada and the United States.

On February 20, the Soviet Foreign Ministry issued an official statement openly acknowledging that they "knew that some information relative to radio location and other matters had been irregularly obtained by a member of the Soviet Embassy in Ottawa," noting that Zabotin and his staff had been recalled. However, the Soviets denied that the ambassador or other members of the embassy staff had been involved and insisted that the information obtained on Western scientific advances had been "insignificant" given the Soviets' rapid technological progress.

The 13 detainees were sequestered at the Rockcliffe Barracks, an RCMP training facility in Ottawa. Cut off from family and denied access to legal counsel, they were kept isolated from each other in individual cells and monitored constantly. The windows were nailed shut and lights at the facility were kept on 24 hours per day, a practice the RCMP insisted was a necessary component of suicide watch. Fearing the suspects may attempt to escape, the RCMP kept the barracks "bathed in the glare of search-lights" and guards, who were made to swear an oath of secrecy, were issued live ammunition.

Examination of the suspects took place in two stages. First, the RCMP interrogators – Havison and Anthony – would question the suspects. They employed a variety of techniques to extract confessions and information regarding the other suspects. Detainees were told they could face execution for their crimes and that other suspects had attempted suicide. Detainees who were Jewish were subjected to racial insults. The detainees were not informed that their testimony could later be used against them or that, under the Canada Evidence Act, they could not be compelled to incriminate themselves. The information they gathered was then passed on to the Commission.

Without proper legal advice and believing they could face execution, some of the detainees quickly gave in to the intense pressure. Lunan, Mazerall, and Woikin all confessed early on. One detainee, Kathleen Willsher, a secretary at the British High Commission who had been wrongly accused of passing on confidential communiqués she would not have had access to, denied spying for the Soviets but confessed to verbally passing on information to the CPC, which was deemed sufficient to warrant charges. Others, however, were more defiant. Shugar, for instance, refused to co-operate with the investigators, demanding to see both a lawyer and his wife. When he was refused, he went on a four-day hunger strike. Meanwhile, his wife, who had returned home to find her husband missing and their home ransacked, had been actively campaigning in the press for his release.

Next, the suspects were taken to the Department of Justice building where they were secretly given a hearing before the Commission. They were seated at a table facing the stenographer, counsel, and Kellock and Taschereau. Again, the detainees were not informed of their rights under the Canada Evidence Act; rather, they were told they were obligated to answer questions. Suspects who denied their guilt were reminded of the statements they made to the RCMP, statements that, in some cases, were extracted after weeks of isolation without access to legal counsel.

As the proceedings dragged on, King became increasingly impatient and he was facing mounting criticism regarding the secrecy around the Commission and the apparent suspension of civil liberties. At first, the media focused on speculating about the identities of the detainees. However, without any definitive information to publish, the narrative quickly began shifting from intrigue to criticism over the treatment of the detainees. Many newspapers began publishing letters written by the wives of some of the detainees pleading for information on their husbands. On February 25, the Commission advised King that they would need an additional two to three weeks before a report could be published. King reportedly told Robertson, "People will not stand for individual liberty being curtained or men being detained and denied counsel and fair trial before being kept in prison... The whole proceedings are far too much like Russia itself." The Commission had originally intended to keep all the suspects detained until hearings were complete but, under pressure to deliver results, began releasing the detainees in waves.

=== Arrests ===
The Commission publicly released an interim report on March 4, 1946, and, for the first time, the public learned of Gouzenko's defection. The report also identified four of the detainees – Lunan, Mazerall, Willsher, and Woikin – but read as though the four suspects had already been convicted, claiming that, "The evidence heard so far... establishes that four persons, namely Mrs. Emma Woikin, Captain Gordon Lunan, Edward Wilfred Mazerall, and Miss Kathleen Mary Willsher... have communicated directly or indirectly secret and confidential information to representatives of the U.S.S.R." The report also claimed – erroneously – that the detainees had been offered counsel, but refused.

That same day, all four were released from Rockcliffe and then arrested and brought to an arraignment in Ottawa. While the word "treason" was used frequently in the media, the Crown had determined it could not pursue charges of treason since the suspects had allegedly shared their information with the Soviet Union, which was Canada's ally at the time. Rather, prosecutors opted to charge the suspects under the Official Secrets Act, a seldom used 1939 law that was so broadly worded that it could be interpreted to mean any contact with an "agent of a foreign power" was a crime. Furthermore, the law effectively shifted the burden of proof to the defendant, stating that a person shall "unless he proves to the contrary, be deemed to have been in communication with an agent of a foreign power" for something as simple as having the agent's phone number written in their address book. The four suspects each faced two charges of violating the Official Secrets Act.

The report was widely featured in newspapers across the country, with many newspapers offering sensationalist headlines, such as suggesting the Soviets were planning a third world war. However, while the interim report included a list of objectives that Moscow had given the GRU, it did not contain any insights into what information the GRU had actually obtained or whether Canadian security had been compromised. Some newspapers were more skeptical of the severity of the threat, with The New York Times noting that, "much of the information asked for... could have been obtained by any military attaché by request" and that "there was no indication in the report that any of this secret information was obtained or communicated."

Following the release of the first four detainees, the Commission began relaxing some of its security measures. Families of the remaining nine detainees were allowed to visit, but were made to swear an oath of secrecy and were forbidden from passing along information to their lawyers.

Also on March 4, Nunn May was arrested in London. The arrest had been timed to coincide with the release of the Commission's interim report, as the British authorities were reluctant to complicate the situation in Canada before the report was released. In fact, Nunn May had been questioned twice by MI5 in late February and had already confessed to leaking atomic secrets to the Soviets. The British had also requested that Willsher – who was accused of leaking documents from the British High Commission in Ottawa – be treated separately from the other detainees and that her name be left out of the interim report over concerns that the appearance of two apparent lapses in British security would harm their credibility. However, the Canadian government, leery of criticism for violating civil liberties, wanted to make it clear to the public that the Soviet Union was spying not just on Canada, but on its allies as well.

At approximately 11:00 pm, on March 14, Rose was arrested in his apartment in Ottawa, while in the midst of a phone interview with a Toronto Daily Star reporter. The Commission, fearful of incurring public backlash over detaining an elected official without charge, had been reluctant to go after Rose. However, while under interrogation, several of the detainees had incriminated him, giving the RCMP the evidence it needed to pursue charges. He was arraigned early the next morning and bail was set at CA$10,000, as the prosecutor noted that a vehicle with a Michigan licence plate had been spotted outside Rose's home, an observation he presented as evidence that Rose had intended to flee to the United States.

The following day, March 15, the Commission released a second interim report, this time identifying Boyer, Gerson, Nightingale, and Shugar. Like the previous four detainees, they were then released from Rockcliffe and immediately arrested and charged with violating the Official Secrets Act. Again, the report contained no indication that the suspects may have been innocent, even though Nightingale and Shugar would later be acquitted. The report, however, was largely overshadowed in the media by Rose's arrest.

The two interim reports did little to assuage the criticism King was facing. When Parliament reopened, he faced criticism from the Opposition over his handling of the affair and his use of wartime powers. John Diefenbaker led the charge, arguing that King's orders-in-Council had effectively swept aside Magna Carta, adding, "When, in the history of the British Empire, was any man ever denied counsel, except under order-in-Council passed by this government?" However, the public proved more supportive; a May Gallup poll found that 91 per cent of Canadians had heard of the Gouzenko Affair and, among those that had, 61 per cent approved of the federal government's handling of the matter.

Restrictions on the remaining five detainees were gradually loosened and their lawyers were eventually allowed access conditional on swearing an oath of secrecy regarding the Commission's proceedings. On March 29, 42 days after the detentions began, the Commission released a third interim report identifying the five remaining detainees: Eric Adams, Scott Benning, Halperin, Fred Poland, and Smith. Again, the five suspects were released from detention and then immediately arrested and charged with violating the Official Secrets Act. However, despite six weeks of solitary confinement, the five men had refused to confess and had been unco-operative with the Commission. Their obstinacy would ultimately pay off, as Adams, Benning, Halperin, and Poland were eventually acquitted; of the five individuals identified in the report, only Smith was convicted.

On April 1, King announced to the House of Commons that P.C. 6444 had been rescinded. With the order revoked, the federal government's wartime powers to suspend civil liberties were ended. In his diary, King wrote:

It is an immense relief to have that order-in-Council cancelled. I feel the Commissioners have thought more of themselves and doing a fine bit and of the report they are making than of the position in which they have placed the Government and our party. It will always be held against us and the Liberal Party that we sanctioned anything that meant so much in the way of deprivation of liberty for a number of people.

The Commission released its final, 733-page report on June 27. The report identified several other suspected agents, including six who would eventually face charges: Carr, Agatha Chapman, Henry Harris, Freda Linton, William Pappin, and John Soboloff.

=== Trials ===
==== Fred Rose ====
Fred Rose attending his pre-trial hearing in March 1946

Rose's arrest was covered widely in the Canadian and American media. Rose was the first elected official anywhere in the West to face charges of espionage. His arrest also seemed to reinforce the notion that the CPC was a front for Soviet intelligence agencies.

Rose's pre-trial hearing began on March 22 in Montreal, marking Gouzenko's first public appearance as a witness. To protect Gouzenko's identity, photographers and sketch artists were barred from the courtroom. Rose's trial began on May 17 and lasted three weeks. Boyer provided testimony that would prove fatal to Rose's defence. The prosecution did not have a confession from Rose, nor did it have second-hand evidence from Gouzenko, as the two men had never met. Instead, the prosecution had only the hearsay evidence of the documents, which would only be admissible if the prosecution could establish a clear link between Rose and the GRU. Boyer would provide that link; he testified that he provided Rose with information regarding RDX, noting how Rose seemed "anxious to do what he could to have the Soviet Union obtain the process officially from Canada."

Rose was convicted on June 16 and sentenced to six years in prison. The jury deliberated for just 30 minutes. Rose would later lose both his seat in the House of Commons and his Canadian citizenship. During the trial, Adams, Gerson, Lunan, Nightingale, and Woikin were also summoned to testify; however, all five refused. Adams, Gerson, Lunan, and Nightingale were each sentenced to three months for contempt of court, while Woikin was sentenced to six.

==== Alan Nunn May ====
Nunn May pleaded guilty and, on May 1, he was sentenced to 10 years' hard labour. Days later, Willsher pleaded guilty and was sentenced to three years in prison. With Nunn May and Willsher both in prison, British involvement in the Gouzenko Affair effectively ended.

==== The original 13 ====
Raymond Boyer (far right, gloves in hand) leaving a courthouse in March 1946

Emma Woikin (centre) following a court appearance in March 1946

Of the 13 barracks detainees, 11 would go to trial (Willsher and Woikin pleaded guilty). Mazerall was first. His trial, held in May, yielded a ruling that would act as a precedent for the other accused spies. The presiding judge, James Chalmers McRuer, allowed the transcripts of the Commission to be used as evidence against Mazerall. He stated that ignorance of the law was not a defence and claimed the accused could have avoided self-incrimination by demanding protection under the Canada Evidence Act. Mazerall was convicted on May 22.

Mazerall was sentenced to four years' imprisonment, a sentence even the prosecutor found excessive. The sentence seemed to suggest that McRuer did not factor in the rather innocuous nature of the information Mazerall had given to the Soviets. Rather, it suggested that Mazerall's punishment was intended to deter other would-be spies in the civil service, rather than reflect the harm he had caused. Mazerall's appeal was later denied.

The trials continued through 1946 and into the spring of 1947. Of the original 13 detainees, seven were ultimately convicted: Boyer, Gerson, Lunan, Mazerall, Smith, Willsher, and Woikin. Benning was also convicted, but his conviction was overturned on appeal in April 1947. Lunan, who was seen as a key figure in the Gouzenko Affair and often referred to as a "spy cell head" and a "master spy" in the media given his role in managing other agents, was convicted in November 1946 and sentenced to five years' imprisonment.

==== The false passport ====
Three additional men identified in the Commission's report – Harris, Pappin, and Soboloff – were charged with helping Witczak procure a false passport. Witczak, whose real identity is unknown, had been living in the United States using the passport of a Polish-born Canadian citizen named Ignacy Witczak. The real Witczak had fought in the Spanish Civil War as a member of the International Brigades, military units sponsored by Communist International, which collected his passport and turned it over to the GRU. The GRU, mistakenly believing Witczak had been killed in action in 1937, appropriated his identity. However, the real Witczak survived and was living in Canada. In 1945, Witczak's passport expired and the GRU feared seeking a renewal could arouse suspicion. Instead, the GRU instructed Carr to bribe a Canadian official to provide a replacement.

Pappin was a clerk at the passport office at the Department of External Affairs who was accused of tampering with files from 1937 related to Witczak's passport. However, the only witness in his case recanted their testimony and Pappin was eventually acquitted, with the judge noting that anyone in the passport office could have accessed Witczak's files. Harris was accused of acting as a facilitator between the GRU and Carr; he was sentenced to five years' imprisonment, though his conviction was later overturned. Soboloff, apparently unaware he was aiding the GRU, had, as a "favour" to Carr, signed Witczak's application as a guarantor, falsely claiming to know him. He was convicted and fined CA$500 in what the prosecution called a case of "gross stupidity."

==== Sam Carr ====
In January 1946, Carr had travelled to Cuba for a Communist Party conference and was returning via New York City when he was tipped off – likely based on the information supplied by Philby – that he would soon be facing arrest. Instead, he remained in New York, living under the alias Jack Lewis. He evaded authorities for more than three years, but was finally arrested on July 27, 1949. Although the Commission's report alleged that Carr played a lead role as a recruiter for the GRU, he was charged only with conspiracy to commit forgery in his role in obtaining a false passport for Witczak. He was convicted and sentenced to six years' imprisonment.

==== Agatha Chapman ====
Chapman was an economist with the Dominion Bureau of Statistics who often hosted study groups in her Ottawa home and she had connections to many of the accused. While Chapman was never mentioned in any of Gouzenko's documents, Willsher, while under interrogation, claimed that she was a GRU agent and she was arrested. The Commission's final report referred to her as a "cell leader" and she was suspended from her job. Eager to clear her name, she wrote to St. Laurent requesting a formal trial. He acquiesced and she was charged in September 1946. She was acquitted on November 27 following a two-day trial.

==== Freda Linton ====
Linton had worked as a secretary to the Commissioner of the National Film Board of Canada (NFB), John Grierson, from May to November 1944 and may have been Rose's mistress. She was mentioned in two of the documents provided by Gouzenko. Gouzenko also testified that she had given Zabotin "some materials." Although there was no evidence she had passed on any secret information, she was subpoenaed in May 1946 but could not be located. Three years later, she surrendered to police in Montreal. Her lawyer, Joseph Cohen, managed to get the charges dropped.

=== Other notable suspects ===
Gouzenko's documents also made reference to an agent in the U.S. State Department, whom the FBI inferred to be Alger Hiss, though they lacked the evidence to pursue charges. In 1948, however, Whittaker Chambers, a former member of the U.S. Communist Party, produced a microfilm of State Department documents he claimed had been supplied by Hiss in 1938. Hiss could not be charged with espionage since the statute of limitations had expired, but he had earlier testified before the House Un-American Activities Committee (HUAC) that he had never met Chambers and was charged with perjury. He was tried twice (the first trial ended with a hung jury) and convicted in January 1950.

Another individual identified by Gouzenko was Arthur Steinberg, a professor of genetics at Antioch College. He had a background in statistics and assisted Boyer in some of his research on RDX. Like many of the accused, Steinberg had communist leanings and had joined the Communist Friendship league. Gouzenko claimed that Linton had connected Steinberg with a Soviet agent and he was mentioned in the Commission's final report. While there was never any direct evidence Steinberg had spied for the GRU, he faced nearly a decade of investigations by the FBI, HUAC, and, later, the Senate Internal Security Subcommittee. Although he was never charged with a crime, his career was ended.

Also caught up in the Gouzenko Affair was Herbert Norman, an External Affairs official who had first caught the attention of American authorities in 1942 when he attempted to retrieve the belongings of Shigeto Tsuru, a Japanese economist who had been recalled to Japan and left most of his works in Cambridge. His name resurfaced in 1950 when the Tydings Committee began investigating State Department employees with connections to the Far East. The RCMP prepared a report for the FBI dated October 17 outlining a few scattered pieces of largely circumstantial evidence against Norman. First, while in university, Norman had taken an academic interest in Marxism and briefly joined the American League Against War and Fascism. In 1936, he encountered Pat Walsh, an undercover RCMP officer who, four years later, filed a report claiming that a "Professor" Herbert Norman at McMaster University was a member of the CPC (Norman was never a member of the McMaster faculty). Second, Norman's name appeared in the address books of two suspected communists: Halperin and Frank Park. Lastly, Gouzenko's testimony from 1946 had made two references to someone named Norman; however, Gouzenko was referring to another individual, Norman Freed, who may have worked for the NKVD in 1944. Lester Pearson, then-Secretary of State for External Affairs (and later Prime Minister), ardently defended Norman and, on December 7, 1950, following a months-long investigation of its own, the RCMP sent the FBI a memorandum exonerating Norman, concluding he was not a security risk. However, the FBI continued to investigate Norman well into 1952.

Grierson was also implicated in the affair. One of Gouzenko's documents – a notebook with an entry written by Motinov – contained a note that read, "Research Council – report on reorganization and work. Freda to the Professor through Grierson." Gouzenko testified that the GRU felt Linton's usefulness was being wasted at the NFB and, instead, wanted Grierson to use his influence to have Linton moved to the NRC alongside Boyer. However, there was no evidence that Grierson had ever suggested such a transfer and Linton had never worked at the NRC. Nevertheless, the FBI considered Grierson, a pioneer documentary filmmaker, a communist sympathizer and had kept a file on him since 1942. Grierson, who had left the NFB in 1945 to start his own film company in New York, was called back to Canada twice to testify before the Commission where he was questioned extensively about the political views of other employees at the NFB. Grierson was never charged with a crime, but the public spotlight fuelled the perception of the NFB as a hotbed for communist activity and several employees were forced to resign.

== Aftermath ==
With the exception of Carr, who would not be apprehended until 1949, the Gouzenko trials were wrapped up by the end of March 1947. In total, 21 people were arrested, yielding 11 convictions.

It is unclear whether any of the suspects implicated in the Gouzenko Affair had leaked any information of value. In a 1960s interview, Dwyer noted that the only significant spy uncovered by Gouzenko was Nunn May. "The rest," he added, "was crap." Even in the case of Nunn May, his knowledge of the atomic bomb would have been limited, as he did not have access to the Los Alamos Laboratory. Perhaps consequently, the Commission's report heavily stressed the information on RDX that Boyer had provided Rose. However, there is no evidence he supplied Rose with information on the actual process for making the explosive. Soviet scientists had also been granted a tour of Canada's pilot RDX plant in Shawinigan Falls 1944. Furthermore, the Soviets would have obtained far more detailed and relevant information on the explosive when the Red Army captured Germany's RDX production facilities in 1944.

Nevertheless, those who found themselves embroiled in the affair were hounded by the publicity they received. Many of the accused – even those who were acquitted or never charged – found their careers destroyed. Adams, Chapman, Poland, and Shugar all lost their jobs with the civil service and Chapman and Shugar felt compelled to leave the country. Linton lived under a false identity for the rest of her life. Halperin retained his position at Queen's University only after a years-long battle with the board of trustees. In June 1947, the Commission published an addendum to its report, clarifying that nine of the suspects had been acquitted; however, the revision read as though the suspects had been cleared only on the basis of legal technicalities. Norman committed suicide in 1957, while Chapman committed suicide in 1963.

=== Soviet retribution ===
Zabotin, along with most of the GRU staff at the Embassy, were recalled to the Soviet Union in December 1945. Zabotin was spared execution, but was sent to a labour camp in Siberia along with his wife and son. The family was released sometime after the death of Stalin in 1953. Zabotin, his health broken from the brutal conditions in the Soviet gulag, died a few years afterwards. Mil'shtein, who had also been compromised by Gouzenko, was also recalled. However, he evaded punishment, likely because he had attempted to warn GRU officials about the risks posed by Gouzenko. Likewise, Zabotin's subordinates were not disciplined. In fact, Motinov was later appointed military attaché to the Soviet Embassy in Washington.

Pavlov also managed to avoid arrest. In May 1946, Pavlov was briefly promoted from second secretary to first secretary, likely as part of a Soviet ruse to support the claim that he and his subordinates were diplomats, not spies. However, the Commission's final report in June described at length how Pavlov headed the NKVD at the Embassy and he was forced to return to the Soviet Union. Upon his return, he, his wife, Klavdia, and their Canadian-born child were denied housing and were forced to share a 12-square-metre apartment with Klavdia's sister and brother-in-law. Pavlov was also demoted from major to captain. Nevertheless, his career eventually recovered and, in 1961, he was appointed deputy chief of Foreign Intelligence for the KGB.

Despite his conviction to the contrary, there is no indication the Soviets intended to have Gouzenko killed following his defection. According to Mil'shtein's memoirs, Stalin had explicitly forbidden the GRU to go after Gouzenko, as he did not want to upset relations with the West. Nevertheless, Gouzenko and Anna were tried in absentia and sentenced to death.

Gouzenko's family, however, faced retribution at the hands of the NKVD. His mother died under interrogation at Lubyanka Prison. His sister's fate is unclear, but Soviet records indicate she was married and living in Chelyabinsk in the late 1950s. Anna's parents, as well as her sister Alia, each spent five years in prison. Alia's daughter, Tatiana, was raised in an orphanage. In his 1948 book, Gouzenko rationalized his decision to defect despite the certainty of reprisals against his family, saying: "My decision was a harsh one but, believe me, it was the only way to break the vicious 'hostage circle' used by the Soviets to hold and muzzle those persons sent to foreign embassies."

=== Impact on Canada-Soviet relations ===
Relations between Canada and the Soviet Union cooled significantly following the Gouzenko Affair. Zarubin left Canada on holiday in December 1945 and never returned. In July 1946, Canada's ambassador to the Soviet Union, L. Dana Wilgress, was transferred to Geneva and was formally withdrawn in 1947. Each ambassador was replaced with a chargé d'affaires and neither side would appoint another ambassador until 1953.

However, the degree to which the deterioration in Canada-Soviet relations can be attributed to the Gouzenko Affair is unclear. Relations between the Soviet Union and the Allies were already deteriorating quickly following the Yalta Conference in February 1945 when it became clear that Stalin was determined to extend the reach of communism throughout Eastern Europe and the Gouzenko Affair was only a step in what was a long-term trend. Rather, the most profound change brought about by the Gouzenko Affair was its impact on public opinion. Whatever sympathy the Soviet Union had garnered during the war quickly faded when Canadians realized that their erstwhile ally had been spying on them. A 1946 survey conducted by the Canadian Institute of Public Opinion found that 58 per cent of Canadians believed that one country was intent on ruling the world and, among those that shared this view, nearly all believed this nation was the Soviet Union.

=== Gouzenko ===
Gouzenko, with a pillow case over his head in 1954

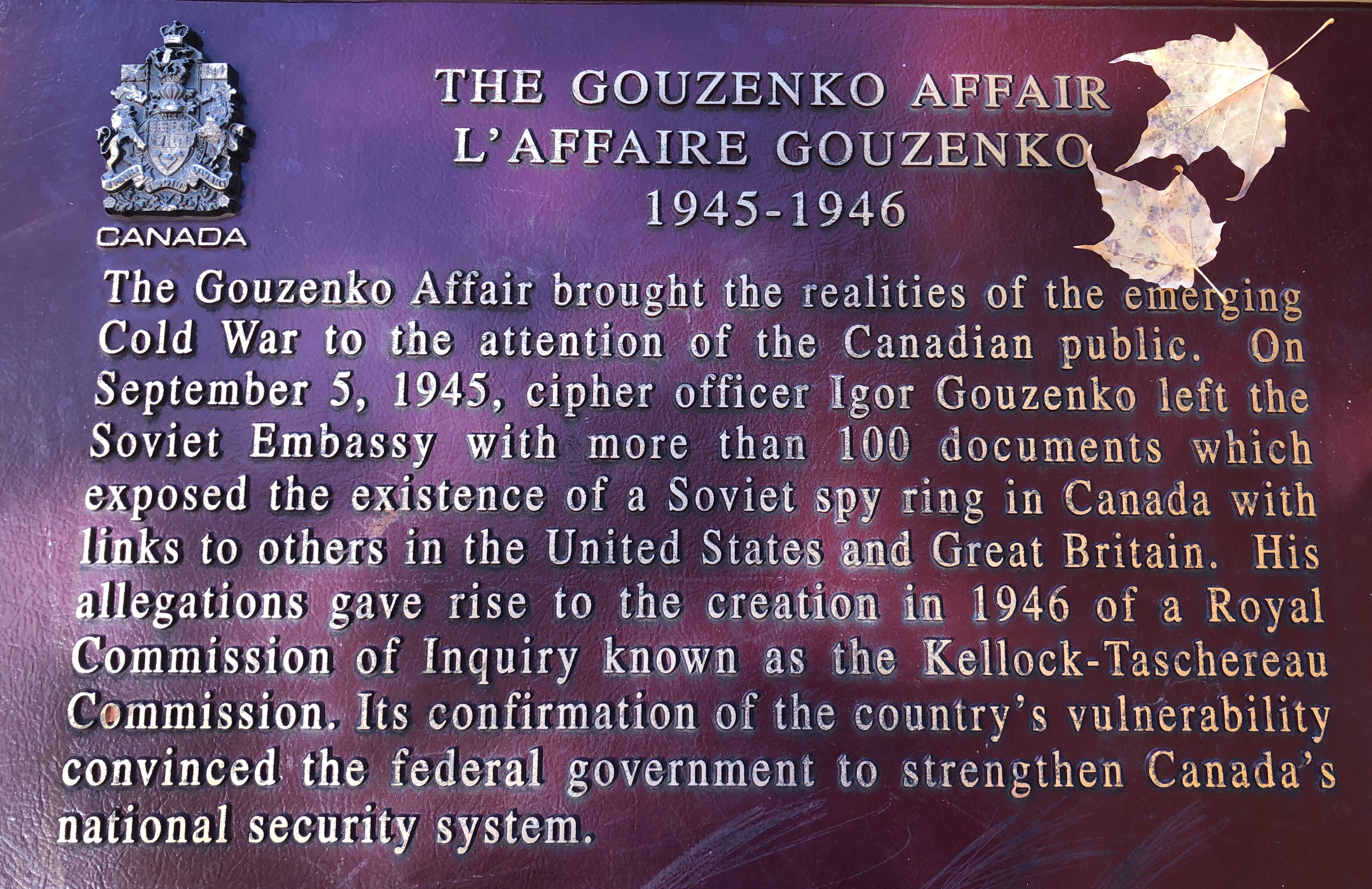
Plaque erected by the Government in Canada in Dundonald Park, across from the apartment building where Gouzenko lived until his defection in 1945

Following the affair, Gouzenko and his family were granted Canadian citizenship and they were given a monthly government pension. They were also assigned new identities as Czech immigrants, becoming Stanley and Anna Krysac. The word krysac translates roughly to "rat" or "mole" in Czech. The name was likely proposed by Leopold, who was Czech and whom Gouzenko had accused of being a spy. For years following their defection, the family changed addresses every few months. They ultimately settled in Mississauga and raised eight children.

Gouzenko remained in the limelight after his defection. He wrote two books: This Was My Choice, an account of his defection published in 1948, and the novel The Fall of a Titan, which won a Governor General's Award in 1954. In 1958, Gouzenko appeared as a mystery guest on CBC's Front Page Challenge; to disguise his identity, he wore a hood over his head, while audio engineers disguised his voice. Gouzenko went on to opine on the Soviet Union; he provided commentary on the Munsinger affair of 1966, as well as on the claims in 1981 that Hollis was a Soviet agent.

Nevertheless, Gouzenko lived the rest of his life fearful that the Soviets would attempt to have him killed. He refused to make appointments, fearing the KGB would intercept his itinerary. Whenever he and Anna would travel by car, he would insist on taking detours. He eventually became convinced the RCMP, who provided him with protection as late as the early 1960s, had been infiltrated by the KGB. According to a journalist who was close to Gouzenko, "I would assume, since I've known an awful lot of psychiatrists, they could spend 10 minutes with him and decide he was a paranoid personality. He did strike me that way... I had a feeling he was crazy but had good reasons for being that way."

Gouzenko was also notoriously protective of his image and launched a slew of defamation lawsuits over the years, which were often successful since Canada's libel laws tended to favour plaintiffs. He attempted to sue Newsweek following a 1964 article that referred to him as a "defector" and, in 1969, he received CA$7,500 from Maclean's in an out-of-court settlement over a 1964 article claiming that he was exaggerating the threat of Soviet retribution against him for personal gain. In 1974, he tried unsuccessfully to sue the Toronto Star for CA$1.3 million, arguing he had been libelled in an opinion piece. Gouzenko also filed lawsuits against roughly a dozen authors, including June Callwood and John Sawatsky. However, the lawsuits against Callwood and Sawatsky were both dropped following Gouzenko's death.

Gouzenko died on June 25, 1982, exactly 39 years after arriving in Canada, and he was buried in an unmarked grave at an undisclosed location in Springcreek Cemetery near Mississauga. The minister who officiated Gouzenko's funeral identified him only as George Brown, a pseudonym Gouzenko had sometimes used. Anna died in 2001 and was buried alongside him. In 2002, Canada's heritage minister, Sheila Copps, designated the Gouzenko Affair an event of national historical importance. On September 5, 2002, the 57th anniversary of Gouzenko's defection, a headstone was finally erected. The headstone used the Gouzenkos' real names instead of the identities they had adopted following Gouzenko's defection. In 2003 and 2004, the City of Ottawa and the federal government, respectively, erected plaques in Dundonald Park, the same park where RCMP officers stood watch over Gouzenko's apartment more than a half-century earlier, commemorating the affair.

=== Implications ===
The impact of the Kellock–Taschereau Commission was far-reaching, first because people implicated in Gouzenko's documents were secretly arrested and denied legal advice under emergency wartime regulations, and an "Emergency Committee for Civil Rights" assembled to defend them. Executive members included C.B. Macpherson, Leopold Infeld, and A.Y. Jackson. Their advertisement in the Toronto Daily Star said that the Commission endangered the "basic rights of Canadians" and did "violence to the rights of free men." They compared the Kellock–Taschereau Commission to the trial of Lt.-Col. John Lilburne during the English Civil War of 1649, stating, "the methods of the Commission are not new. They were used against Englishmen in 1649 and against Canadians in 1946."

Nevertheless, the Canadian government, despite its heavy-handed approach to Gouzenko's revelations, avoided the more extreme anti-communist measures that would characterize McCarthyism in the United States. Following the affair, the Government of Canada bolstered its screening procedures for civil servants and immigrants and reformed its laws against treason and sedition, but it did not pass legislation such as the Taft–Hartley Act, which restricted American labour unions and compelled union leaders to swear oaths that they were not communists. The difference in approaches can be largely attributed to the differing political situations. Canada's Liberal Party enjoyed an uninterrupted chain of election victories from 1935 to 1957 and could therefore exercise restraint amid growing communist fears. Support for the Democratic Party, however, was not as firmly entrenched and, as such, policy makers were more susceptible to pressure from anti-communist groups.

Whatever the implications for civil and legal rights, the Gouzenko Affair was the first significant international incident of the Cold War and marked the beginning of the Red Scare. The exposure of Nunn May prompted increased investigation, which discovered such spies as Klaus Fuchs and Julius and Ethel Rosenberg. In the Literary Review of Canada, Margaret Atwood listed the report of the Kellock–Taschereau Commission as one of Canada's 100 most important books.

Filling 6,000 pages, Gouzenko's testimony was not made public until 1981.

== List of arrests ==
In total, 21 suspected spies were arrested as a result of Gouzenko's revelations. Of the 20 Canadians arrested, ten were convicted and received punishments ranging from a CA$500 fine to six years' imprisonment. British nuclear scientist Alan Nunn May was arrested in England in March 1946 and pleaded guilty.

=== Convicted ===
- Raymond Boyer: An assistant professor of chemistry at McGill University, Boyer passed on information regarding Canadian work on chemical explosives, namely RDX. He was sentenced to two years' imprisonment.
- Sam Carr: According to the documents provided by Gouzenko, Carr acted as a recruiting agent for the GRU and aided Witczak in obtaining a false passport. He fled to the United States where he lived under the alias, "Jack Lewis." He was arrested in New York City in January 1949 and extradited to Canada where he was charged with conspiracy to obtain a false passport. He was convicted and sentenced to six years in prison.
- Harold Gerson: Gerson was a geological engineer with the Department of Munitions and Supply, a crown corporation that produced explosives. He passed on information regarding the testing of projectiles. He was initially sentenced to five years' imprisonment; however, his conviction was overturned on appeal. He was convicted at a new trial and sentenced to four years. He was also sentenced to three months for contempt of court when he refused to testify at Rose's trial.
- Gordon Lunan: Lunan was an editor with the Wartime Information Board. He acted as a recruiting agent and attempted to enlist other informants, soliciting whatever information he could and reporting back to Rogov. He was convicted and sentenced to five years in prison. He was also given two additional sentences totalling 15 months for contempt of court when he refused to testify against Halperin and Rose.
- Alan Nunn May: A British physicist who had worked with the NRC in Montreal since 1943, Nunn May passed on information regarding his research on uranium. Most notably, he supplied the Soviets with a small sample of enriched uranium. He was arrested in the United Kingdom, pleaded guilty, and, in May 1946, was sentenced to ten years' hard labour.
- Edward Mazerall: An electrical engineer with the NRC, Mazerall leaked two research reports on air navigation. He was tried by jury and sentenced to four years in prison.
- Fred Rose: A Polish-born member of Parliament, Rose was a recruiter for the Soviets and acted as a go-between for many of the accused spies. He was arrested on March 14, 1946 and charged with conspiring to provide secret information about RDX. He was convicted in June 1946 and sentenced to six years in prison. He was expelled from the House of Commons in 1947 and his Canadian citizenship was revoked in 1957.
- Philip Durnford Smith: An electrical engineer with the NRC, Smith passed on material on radar systems, radio tubes, and microwaves. Smith was convicted and sentenced to five years' imprisonment.
- John Soboloff: Soboloff was a Toronto physician who was charged with falsely attesting to know Witczak in order to help him procure a passport. He was convicted and fined CA$500.
- Kathleen Willsher: Willsher was a secretary at the office of the British High Commissioner, Malcolm MacDonald. The only evidence implicating her in the affair was a set of leaked letters that the Soviets had mistakenly attributed to her and that she would not have had access to. However, while under interrogation, she confessed that she verbally communicated general information to the CPC. She pleaded guilty and was sentenced to three years.
- Emma Woikin: A cipher clerk at the Department of External Affairs, Woikin passed on several secret diplomatic cables to a contact at the Soviet Embassy. She pleaded guilty and was sentenced to two-and-a-half years plus an additional six months for contempt of court for refusing to testify at Rose's trial.

=== Acquitted ===
- Eric Adams: Adams was an economist with the Bank of Canada. He was identified by Gouzenko as a spy code-named "Ernst" who, in late 1944, passed along information regarding the dispatch of munitions to the United Kingdom and whom Gouzenko described as a Jewish employee of the Bank of Canada. However, Adams was not Jewish and was working at the Canadian Industrial Development Bank at that time. Furthermore, Adams was not involved with any military committee, either at the Canadian Industrial Development Bank or the Bank of Canada. He was nevertheless arrested and tried by jury. He was acquitted on October 22, 1946, but his career was ruined and he found himself unemployable. He was also sentenced to three months for contempt of court when he refused to testify at Rose's trial.
- James Scotland "Scott" Benning: An employee of the Department of Munitions and Supply, Benning was accused of passing on an assortment of information. He was convicted on October 29, 1946 and sentenced to five years' imprisonment. His conviction was overturned on appeal in April 1947.
- Agatha Chapman: An economist for the Dominion Bureau of Statistics, Chapman belonged to a number of socialist study groups and had connections to many of the accused. She was not mentioned in any of the documents provided by Gouzenko, but Willsher claimed she was a GRU contact and she was arrested. She was acquitted on November 27, 1946, but she found herself ostracized from the civil service and left Canada for several years. She committed suicide in 1963.
- Israel Halperin: Halperin was a mathematics professor at Queen's University who had taken leave to serve in the Canadian Artillery during the Second World War. He was mentioned in four of the reports Lunan submitted to Rogov. Although Lunan never cited him as a source of any secret information, Halperin was nonetheless charged and tried. He was acquitted on March 24, 1947 due to lack of evidence.
- Henry Harris: Harris was a Toronto optometrist who was charged with procuring a false passport for Witczak. He was convicted on January 27, 1947 and sentenced to five years, but his conviction was overturned on appeal on May 27.
- Matt Nightingale: Nightingale had served as a telephone specialist with the Royal Canadian Air Force (RCAF). He admitted to meeting with Rogov, but there is no indication he had passed on any information. He was tried by jury and acquitted on November 7, 1946. However, he was sentenced to three months for contempt of court when he refused to testify at Rose's trial.
- William Pappin: A clerk in the passport office at the Department of External Affairs, Pappin was accused of tampering with records in order to help procure a passport for Witczak. He was charged with conspiring to obtain a false passport, but he was acquitted on October 18, 1946 when the only witness admitted she had "given an untrue statement" to the Commission.
- Frederick Poland: Poland had been a squadron leader in the RCAF before transferring to the Wartime Information Board in 1944. One of the documents provided by Gouzenko – a notebook belonging to Zabotin – made a partially illegible reference to a "Holland" or "Polland", a Toronto-based RCAF officer who had passed along a map of training schools in the area. Given his communist leanings and the fact he had shared an Ottawa apartment with Lunan, investigators surmised that the individual was Poland, even though Poland had lived in Ottawa since 1942, a year before Zabotin was assigned there. Poland was acquitted on January 16, 1947, but was barred from working for the federal government.
- David Shugar: Shugar had worked as a radar specialist who specialized in submarine detection research for the Royal Canadian Navy. There is no indication Shugar had acted as an agent for the Soviet Union; rather, he had been identified as a potential recruit in what was effectively a GRU wish list. The charges against him were dropped at his preliminary hearing; however, they were later revived and he was tried in December 1946. He was acquitted on December 7, but he lost his job with the federal government. Finding himself blacklisted, he moved to France and, later, Poland. In 1957, the Government of Canada tried unsuccessfully to revoke his Canadian citizenship.

=== Charges withdrawn ===
- Freda Linton: A secretary to the Commissioner of the National Film Board of Canada, John Grierson, Linton was mentioned in two of the documents provided by Gouzenko. Gouzenko also testified that she had given Zabotin "some materials." She surrendered to police in Montreal in 1949. The charges were ultimately dropped, but she lived under a false identity for the remainder of her life.

== See also ==
- Canada in the Cold War
- List of Canadian royal commissions
- PROFUNC
- Soviet espionage in the United States
