= Gordon Lunan =

Canadian spy for the Soviet Union

- Born: David Gordon Lunan; December 31, 1914; Kirkcaldy, Scotland
- Died: October 3, 2005 (aged 90); Hawkesbury, Ontario, Canada
- Criminal charges: Seven counts of violating the Official Secrets Act
- Criminal penalty: Five years' imprisonment plus a combined total of 15 months for contempt of court
- Spouses: Phyllis Newman (m. 1938; div. 1952) Miriam Magee (m. 1953; died 1988)

David Gordon Lunan (December 31, 1914 – October 3, 2005) was a Canadian Army officer who, in 1946, was convicted of espionage on behalf of the Soviet Union. Lunan was identified as a spy by Igor Gouzenko when he defected from the Soviet Embassy in Ottawa in September 1945 and launched what became known as the Gouzenko Affair. Lunan had acted as a handler for three other accused spies: Israel Halperin, Edward Mazerall, and Durnford Smith. He was sentenced to five years' imprisonment and given two additional sentences totalling 15 months for contempt of court when he refused to testify against Halperin and Fred Rose.

== Early life ==
Lunan was born December 31, 1914, in Kirkcaldy, Scotland. He had three brothers and his father worked as a commercial traveller. When he was nine years old, his family moved to London where he attended Belmont School and, later, Mill Hill School. He finished school at 17 and began an apprenticeship with S. H. Benson, a British advertising company. After two years, he earned a position in the copy department and worked as a copywriter.

Lunan immigrated to Canada in 1938 and found work with A. McKim, an advertising agency in Montreal. In 1939, Lunan met Phyllis Newman, a Polish immigrant. The two were married in September of that year, shortly after the start of the Second World War.

On January 20, 1943, Lunan enlisted in the Canadian Army as a private. Three months later, he earned a commission as a second lieutenant and was transferred to the Royal Canadian Corps of Signals at the Barriefield Military Camp in Kingston and, on December 16, 1943, he was transferred to the Edmonton Fusiliers. Eleven months later, Lunan was assigned to the Wartime Information Board with the rank of lieutenant. He was posted in Ottawa, where he edited Canadian Affairs, a military journal written for members of the armed forces serving overseas to keep them appraised of current affairs and prepare them for return to civilian life.

Lunan became active in a number of political movements, such as the Quebec Committee for Allied Victory and the communist Labor-Progressive Party (LLP). While he never joined the Communist Party, he had several communist connections. He was befriended by Fred Rose, a politician and union organizer who would go on to become a member of Parliament under the LLP banner. He met often with Rose and other communist activists and allowed them the use of his apartment for discussion groups. In his 1995 memoir, The Making of a Spy: A Political Odyssey, he wrote:

I admired the Soviet Union for what I believed then to be its enlightened worldview. I wished it well, but like most of my comrades, I suspect, I would not have wanted to live there or to make Canada over in its likeness. RCMP claims to the contrary notwithstanding, the real glue that abound me to my comrades and them to me was the shared desire for a more humane society, a fairer distribution of wealth.

== Espionage ==
Lunan's espionage activities began in March 1945. Lunan was approached by Rose about supplying information to the Soviets, a proposal Lunan quickly agreed to. There are varying accounts of how the Soviets first made contact with Lunan. According to the testimony he would later give to the Kellock–Taschereau Commission, he arrived in his office one morning to find an anonymous note on his desk, inviting him to meet an unnamed person at a corner on Rideau Street. According to his memoir, he received an anonymous phone call from a young woman instructing him to meet her at the Château Laurier. She led him down Sussex Drive where she introduced him to a "shabbily and rather oddly dressed" man.

In either case, the individual was Colonel Vasili Rogov, assistant to Colonel Nikolai Zabotin, the military attaché at the Soviet Embassy, whom Lunan knew only as "Jan". Rogov proved rigidly secretive and their initial meeting was brief; the two men climbed into the back of a chauffeur-driven car and the vehicle took off. Rogov briefly questioned Lunan about his job and handed him a white envelope with instructions to destroy it after he had read its contents. The driver hurriedly circled back toward their starting point and Lunan was unceremoniously dropped off mid-block.

The envelope contained instructions to act as a go-between for three prospective informants: Israel Halperin (to whom the Soviet had assigned the code name, "Bacon"), Edward Mazerall (code-named "Bagley"), and Durnford Smith (code-named "Badeau"). The three men attended the same discussion group and Lunan was already acquainted with Smith. Lunan was to relay requests for information on Canadian research in a number of fields. Lunan's career in journalism offered him cover for recruiting informants, some of whom were led to believe they were speaking to him in his capacity as editor of Canadian Affairs. Lunan was assigned the code name, "Back."

Smith was the most productive of Lunan's sources. Smith was an electrical engineer with the National Research Council (NRC). From March to August 1945, he passed along 17 secret reports – totalling 700 pages – on radar systems, radio tubes, and microwaves. However, the information proved to be extremely technical and Lunan, with no scientific background, proved ineffective as an intermediary. Instead, the GRU opted to have Rogov deal with Smith directly.

Halperin was a mathematics professor at Queen's University who had taken leave to serve in the Canadian Artillery during the Second World War. The Soviets assigned Lunan a lengthy list of objectives regarding Halperin; among other things, they wanted him to provide information regarding Canadian research on explosives and, in particular, supply samples of uranium. Halperin met with Lunan several times but supplied him only with verbal information on the capacity of Canadian explosives plants – information that was already publicly available – which Lunan wrote up in a one-and-a-half-page report. Lunan continued to press Halperin for more information – particularly written information since Lunan lacked the expertise to convey complex scientific concepts back to the Soviets – but Halperin continually refused. Lunan reported to Rogov, "It is impossible to get anything from him except... verbal descriptions, and I am not in a position to understand everything fully where it concerns technical details." Halperin eventually cut off contact with Lunan entirely.

Mazerall was an electrical engineer with the NRC. He was reluctant to help Lunan and put off meeting with him for weeks. Finally, in late July 1945, Lunan approached him under the guise that the editor of an army newspaper was looking for information on developments in radar technology. Mazerall gave him two documents marked "confidential" – a research proposal and a paper on air navigation that was set to be presented at an upcoming symposium in London which the Soviets would be attending.

Documents that were later obtained by the Kellock–Taschereau Commission suggest that, on at least two occasions, Lunan was given a payment of $100, with an additional $30 for each of Halperin, Mazerall, and Smith. Another document suggested Rogov provided a separate gift of $100 following the birth of Lunan's daughter, whom he had named Jan, Rogov's code name. Lunan would later deny having received any payments. In his memoir, Lunan claimed he was offered money, which he refused. He speculated that the money allocated to him was instead misappropriated by Embassy staff.

On June 5, 1945, Lunan was promoted to captain. He ceased his espionage activities in August 1945 following the atomic bombing of Hiroshima. His position with the Wartime Information Board did not give him access to any secret information that would have been of value to the Soviets. Rather, his usefulness was limited to the extent he could extract information from Halperin, Mazerall, and Smith and he did not have the scientific literacy to act as an effective go-between. He noted in his memoir:

My judgment eventually led me to abdicate my role as intermediary. Rogov was not interested in my assessment of Canadian or international affairs and I was not qualified to appraise information of a scientific nature, or to discuss or evaluate any reciprocal information coming from Rogov. Nor, for that matter, was I prepared to pressure or influence the others to do anything against their own judgment.

== Gouzenko Affair ==
In September 1944, Igor Gouzenko, a 25-year-old cipher clerk at the Soviet Embassy, learned that he was to be recalled to the Soviet Union. The Soviet Union had been devastated by the Second World War and the standard of living in his country could not compare to that afforded by his post in Canada. Zabotin was able to delay his return by insisting he could not be spared until a replacement could be found and trained. In July 1945, however, his replacement arrived from Moscow and Gouzenko's departure seemed inevitable. Eager to avoid repatriation, he gathered more than 100 documents that implicated a number of Canadians – including Lunan – and defected from the embassy on September 5. Prime Minister William Lyon Mackenzie King responded later that year by signing a top-secret Order-in-Council (P.C. 6444) passed under the authority of the War Measures Act. It allowed police to detain suspects without evidence and suspended the suspects' right to legal counsel.

Rose had received news of Gouzenko's defection on September 6. He passed along the news to his contacts, telling them, "Lie low. Don't talk. Nothing will happen." He assured Lunan that he was unlikely to face any recourse, as King would be reluctant to upset relations with the Soviet Union. As time passed, Lunan appeared to grow more relaxed; on November 7, the anniversary of the October Revolution, Lunan and Rose attended a celebration at the Soviet Embassy.

For five months, Rose's prediction appeared to hold; Gouzenko's defection remained a secret. Prime Minister William Lyon Mackenzie King had been hesitant to get involved out of fear of damaging relations with the Soviet Union and undermining talks about nuclear weapons control. Additionally, the Soviet Union had largely ceased its espionage activities within Canada following Gouzenko's defection and the suspects posed no immediate threat to Canadian security.

On January 9, 1946, Lunan was sent to London where he was stationed at Canada House. He was initially tasked with providing publicity for the first session of the United Nations General Assembly, but he ended up as a speechwriter for Paul Martin Sr., King's Secretary of State for External Affairs. Martin was aware that Lunan was under suspicion of espionage.

On February 3, 1946, Gouzenko's defection was made public when Drew Pearson, an NBC Radio host, announced in his weekly broadcast that a Soviet agent had surrendered to Canadian authorities and that Canada was quietly investigating a Soviet spy ring. On February 5, King hurriedly launched the Kellock–Taschereau Commission, a royal commission chaired by Supreme Court Justices Roy Kellock and Robert Taschereau, to investigate Gouzenko's information.

== Detention and trial ==
On February 13, Lunan was sent a cable recalling him to Canada under the pretense that he was urgently needed for an "important assignment" in Ottawa. He arrived at Dorval Airport on February 15. He heard his name called over the loud-speaker. He was directed to a small room where several plainclothes RCMP officers surrounded and detained him. That same day, 10 others were detained in a series of police raids in Montreal, Ottawa, and Kingston, with two others detained the following day. Among those detained were Halperin, Mazerall, and Smith. Rose would not be taken into custody until March 14.

=== Detention and interrogation ===
Lunan and the other detainees were held in an RCMP barracks at Rockcliffe. They were kept isolated and denied access to family or counsel. They were forbidden from speaking to the guards or the other detainees. The windows at the facility had been nailed shut and the lights were left on 24 hours per day. The detainees were kept under suicide watch.

Lunan was one of the first to be targeted for interrogation. He was questioned by Clifford Harvison, an RCMP officer who would go on to become Commissioner of the RCMP. In his memoir, Lunan recalled Harvison saying, "Well, we've tangled with you reds before and you scream your heads off but there is no way you're going to wiggle out of this one. You know why you're here. Are you ready to tell us what you know?" Lunan claimed he at first denied any involvement in espionage activities and demanded to speak to a lawyer. Harvison denied this request, saying, "At the moment you have no rights. You are being legally detained under an Order in Council and you are obliged by law to answer my questions."

Harvison persisted, showing him copies of the documents Gouzenko had shared and showing Lunan surveillance records dating back as far as 1939. Harvison knew his code name, "Back" and had details of his encounters with Rogov. Lunan was told the other detainees had implicated him (and, in fact, Mazerall had). At one point, Harvison, evidently unaware that Lunan's wife was Jewish, resorted to anti-Semitism, asking him "Are you going to stand by and let people with names like Rosenberg, Kogan, Mazerall, Rabinovitch, and Halperin sell Canada down the river?"

After a few days, Lunan, fearing that, as a member of the armed forces, he could be shot for treason, relented and confessed his involvement. On February 28, he was brought to testify before the Commission and provided details of his meetings with Halperin, Mazerall, and Smith, though not Rose. On February 20, investigators reported in a memorandum to MI6:

After long and delicate interrogation, during which was told of overwhelming evidence against him, LUNAN was finally brought to point where he stated he might be prepared to assist Canadian government and that he could be of great help. He was gone far enough to make retraction difficult and with luck he will make statement tomorrow.

Another memorandum was sent the following day:

LUNAN has confessed completely... and has implicated fully SMITH, MAZERALL and HALPERIN.

=== Arrest and trial ===
On March 4, 1946, the Commission released an interim report publicly identifying four of the detainees: Lunan, Mazerall, Kathleen Willsher, and Emma Woikin. That same day, all four were released from Rockcliffe and then arrested and brought to an arraignment in Ottawa where they each faced two charges of violating the Official Secrets Act: conspiring to provide information to the Soviets and having provided the information. The Crown had determined it could not pursue charges of treason since the information had been shared with the Soviet Union, which was Canada's ally at the time. Lunan did not enter a plea. Following his arraignment, Lunan was taken to the Ottawa Jail.

Gouzenko had produced a considerable amount of evidence implicating Lunan and, consequently, Lunan was seen as a key figure in the Gouzenko Affair. The press referred to him as a "spy cell head" and a "master spy." In a later interview, however, Mazerall disputed these assessments, saying:

They took the view that Lunan was a more hardened individual, for some strange reason. I don't see how he could have been because he wouldn't have given way so early in the barracks if he had been an experienced person.

On March 12, Lunan returned to court to learn he was facing five additional charges under the Official Secrets Act. On March 14, bail set at $6,000. He made bail the following day.

At a preliminary hearing on March 28, Lunan's lawyer, H.L. Cartwright, attempted to cast doubt on his confession before the Commission by questioning him about the conditions he faced in detention. Lunan described the conditions as "psychological torture", citing his isolation, the 24-hour lighting, and Harvison's "highly vindictive" attitude, though he could not identify any specific instances of physical threats or intimidation. However, the magistrate, Glenn Strike, dismissed these arguments, ruling the testimony admissible.

In May, Mazerall's trial yielded a ruling that would act as a precedent for the other accused spies. The presiding judge, James Chalmers McRuer, allowed the transcripts of the Commission to be used as evidence against Mazerall. He stated that ignorance of the law was not a defence and claimed the accused could have avoided self-incrimination by demanding protection under the Canada Evidence Act. Lunan was called to testify in Mazerall's trial, but refused; however, McRuer did not charge him with contempt of court. Nevertheless, on May 22, Mazerall was sentenced to four years' imprisonment.

In June, however, Lunan was charged with contempt of court and sentenced to three months when he refused to testify at Rose's trial. He served his sentence at Bordeaux Prison in Montreal while awaiting his own trial.

Lunan's trial began on November 13 and would last four days. He was represented by Joseph Cohen, who had also defended Rose. Cohen's defence strategy was largely centred on discrediting the Commission and having Lunan's testimony ruled inadmissible, arguing the "intimidation, threats, promises and inducements in a legal sense, every type of thing makes his testimony inadmissible". He had subpoenas served to a number of officials, including King, Kellock, and C. D. Howe, Canada's Minister of Reconstruction. However, the presiding judge, A. Gordon McDougall, ruled the testimony admissible. Cohen also objected to Gouzenko as a witness, arguing the documents he took from the Embassy were diplomatically immune from court, but he was overruled.

On Friday, November 15, after the Crown finished presenting its case, the trial came to an abrupt end when Cohen declared he would not be presenting any defence evidence. None of the witnesses he called appeared in court. The following Monday, November 18, McDougall found Lunan guilty of conspiracy and sentenced him to five years' imprisonment at Kingston Penitentiary. While passing sentence, he told Lunan:

Lunan, you are an educated and able man. You have been given every opportunity in this country and were granted the King's commission in the Canadian Army. I can find no excuse whatever for what you have done.

Lunan remained free pending his appeal. However, he was not represented by Cohen during the appeal process, as the relationship between the two men soon broke down in a dispute over fees.

On December 27, Smith was convicted of conspiracy to communicate confidential information to the Soviets following a four-day trial. In his decision, McDougall cited "an overwhelming mass of evidence" and told Smith, "It is extremely unfortunate that a man of your abilities [should be guilty of such a crime]." Smith was sentenced to five years. His appeal was denied. Lunan expressed regret over implicating Smith and refused to testify at his trial.

Halperin's trial had been set for December 1946. However, the trial was put on hold when Lunan was called as a witness and he refused to testify. When the court reconvened in March 1947, the charges were dismissed due to lack of evidence when Lunan again refused to testify. Lunan was again charged with contempt of court and sentenced to an additional year in prison.

On April 16, 1947, Lunan's appeals against his conviction and sentence were both denied. He surrendered to the Carleton County Sheriff, but could not be sent directly to Kingston due to a severe snowstorm. Instead, he spent the next several days in the Ottawa Jail, time that was not counted toward his sentence.

== Later life ==
Lunan was released on October 20, 1951, after serving four-and-a-half years, with time off for good behaviour. His marriage to Newman survived his incarceration, but she filed for divorce in 1952. Lunan later married Miriam Magee, a woman he met at a party celebrating his release. The two were married in Montreal, where Lunan returned to the advertising industry and eventually started his own firm. In 1975, he retired and the couple moved to a rural home outside Ottawa. Magee died from cancer in 1988.

In 1995, Lunan published a memoir on his experiences, The Making of a Spy: A Political Odyssey. In 2005, the memoir was republished as Redhanded: Inside the Spy Ring that Changed the World. The primary difference between the two books is an epilogue in the latter where he said he acted "naively, stupidly and admittedly outside the law" and expressed regret over his role in the Gouzenko Affair and bringing about the Cold War in Canada.

In 2005, Lunan suffered a fall and spent the final two weeks of his life in a hospital in Hawkesbury, Ontario. He died October 3 at the age of 90.

== Published works ==
- The Making of Spy: A Political Odyssey (1995)
- Redhanded: Inside the Spy Ring that Changed the World (2005)
