= Emma Woikin =

Canadian spy for the Soviet Union

- Born: Emma Konkin; December 30, 1920; Blaine Lake, Saskatchewan, Canada
- Died: May 22, 1974 (aged 53); Saskatoon, Saskatchewan, Canada
- Criminal charges: Two counts of violating the Official Secrets Act
- Criminal penalty: Two-and-a-half years' imprisonment plus an additional six months for contempt of court
- Spouses: Bill Woikin (m. 1937; died 1942) Louis Sawula (m. 1949)

Emma Woikin (née Konkin; December 30, 1920 – May 22, 1974) was a Canadian civil servant who, in 1946, was convicted of spying on behalf of the Soviet Union. Woikin was one of the Canadians identified as spies by Igor Gouzenko when he defected from the Soviet Embassy in Ottawa in September 1945 in what became known as the Gouzenko Affair. Woikin was sentenced to two-and-a-half years at Kingston Penitentiary, becoming the first woman imprisoned for espionage in Canada.

== Early life ==
Woikin was born Emma Konkin on December 30, 1920 (Note: Birth dates in that era were treated somewhat casually and, while Woikin was born on December 30, 1920, her birth was registered as January 1, 1921.) in Blaine Lake, Saskatchewan to Alex and Pearl Konkin, the youngest of five children. Her parents were Independent Doukhobors who had fled Russia in 1899 and her family spoke Russian in the home. Her mother died when Woikin was 15 following a series of strokes.

Woikin excelled in school and, at the age of 12, she completed grade eight, the highest level of schooling offered by the local schoolhouse. However, the high school in Blaine Lake would not accept her as a student, as she was thought to be too young.

In 1937, at the age of 16, Woikin married William "Bill" Woikin, (Note: Many Doukhobor immigrants were indifferent when it came to the transliteration of their surnames into the Latin alphabet and Bill Woikin's relatives used a variety of spellings, including "Voyken," "Voykin," and "Woykin." Consequently, some newspapers would later refer to Woikin as "Emma Voykin.") also an Independent Doukhobor, from Langham. Life in the Prairies was exceptionally difficult at the time; Saskatchewan had been particularly hard-hit by the Great Depression and an ongoing drought meant 1937 saw some of the worst crop yields in the province's history. The couple's income averaged five dollars per month.

Woikin faced two major tragedies in relatively quick succession. She became pregnant in her second year of marriage. She went into labour on May 20, 1939; however, what would be the couple's only child – a boy – died at birth the next morning. Bill Woikin later developed debilitating headaches. He may have suffered from depression and, at one point, remarked to Woikin how he could no longer tolerate the pain. On March 18, 1942, he hanged himself at the age of 28. He had only 75 cents at the time of his death. Bill Woikin had not sought medical treatment due to the cost and Canada's lack of free health care at the time and, consequently, Woikin blamed the Canadian health care system for her husband's death.

For six months following her husband's death, Woikin found herself too weak to work. She eventually moved to Marcelin where she stayed briefly at a convent. She continued her education, studying typing, bookkeeping, and stenography and, by the end of her first year in Marcelin, completed a two-year commercial course. In the summer of 1943, she moved to Saskatoon where she found janitorial work at St. Paul's Hospital.

=== Move to Ottawa ===
As the Second World War raged on, the federal government was rapidly expanding the civil service. In the summer of 1943, Woikin visited a federal government office in Saskatoon where she wrote a civil service exam. In August, she received a telegram offering her a job as a typist for the passport division of the Department of External Affairs with a monthly salary of $52. She moved to Ottawa the following month, arriving on September 10. Upon starting at the Department of External Affairs, she was given an employee information form where she declared herself a British subject of Russian origin.

In February 1944, she was transferred to the Cipher Division. She worked as a cipher clerk, coding and decoding cables to and from London and Washington. Her salary was raised to $57 per month.

Woikin's social life revolved largely around Ottawa's Russian community and, in particular, the Federation of Russian Canadians where employees of the Soviet Embassy had an active presence. She developed a fascination with Russia and became an avid reader of Leo Tolstoy's works. In March 1944, she applied unsuccessfully with the Department of External Affairs to be sent overseas to Russia as a typist.

== Espionage ==
On May 1, 1944, May Day in the Soviet Union, Woikin attended a dinner party where she met Major Vsevolod Sokolov, a Russian army officer from the Soviet Embassy in Ottawa, and his wife Lida Sokolov. Over the next year, the husband-and-wife team cultivated a relationship with Woikin. They would exchange gifts and, at one point, Woikin presented Lida a watercolour sketch she had painted.

When Woikin learned that the Soviet Embassy sometimes recruited Canadians to serve various functions, she submitted an application. However, when Sokolov consulted his superiors, the reply was that Woikin was too valuable where she was. Dejected, Woikin reportedly told Sokolov, "I want to help Russia," to which he replied, "You can help Russia much better from where you are." Woikin was assigned the codename "Nora".

Woikin's espionage activities began sometime in late spring 1945 when she was visiting the Sokolovs in their King Street home. During the evening, Sokolov began asking Woikin about the information that was moving between London and Ottawa and suggested she pass along anything that might be of interest to the Soviet Union. Woikin responded that she would consider the matter, but scoffed at the idea of accepting money in return. She called Sokolov two days later, accepting his proposition.

Woikin began passing messages to the Sokolovs in late May 1945. She would take decoded messages received at the Department of External Affairs and commit them to memory. She would later transcribe them – almost word for word – and pass them on to Lida once per month. During one of their encounters, Lida handed her an envelope with the words, "a gift" written on it. When Woikin arrived home, she discovered the envelope contained $50, nearly a month's salary for her. She used the money to purchase a train ticket to Blaine Lake, her first visit to her hometown since arriving in Ottawa nearly two years earlier.

In August 1945, following the atomic bombing of Hiroshima, the Soviet Embassy ramped up its secrecy measures as it redoubled its efforts to obtain secret information regarding the Manhattan Project. Rather than meet Lida in person, Woikin was instructed by telephone to tape her transcribed notes to the underside of a toilet cover in a dentist's office across from the Lord Elgin Hotel. However, when a Russian agent – the embassy chauffeur, Captain Gourshkov – arrived to collect the documents, Woikin approached and greeted him in Russian, ultimately defeating the purpose of a dead drop system designed to avoid direct contact. Following the unexpected rendezvous, embassy staff decided to return to the original system where Woikin would meet directly with Lida. Woikin delivered her final batch of messages – four cables that had been received between August 24 and August 31 – sometime on either September 4 or September 5.

=== The Gouzenko Affair ===
In September 1944, Igor Gouzenko, a 25-year-old cipher clerk at the Soviet Embassy, learned that he was to be recalled to the Soviet Union. The Soviet Union had been devastated by the Second World War and the standard of living and freedoms afforded by his post in Canada could not compare to those in his home country. His superior, Colonel Nikolai Zabotin, was able to delay his return by insisting he could not be spared until a replacement could be found and trained. In July 1945, however, his replacement arrived from Moscow and Gouzenko's departure seemed inevitable. Eager to avoid repatriation, he gathered more than 100 documents that implicated a number of Canadian civil servants – including the four messages Woikin had delivered in early September – and defected from the embassy on September 5. Prime Minister William Lyon Mackenzie King responded later that year by signing a top-secret order-in-council (P.C. 6444) passed under the authority of the War Measures Act. The order directed the Minister of Justice, Louis St. Laurent, to use whatever means necessary to investigate Gouzenko’s claim. It allowed police to detain suspects without evidence and suspended the suspects' right to legal counsel. Woikin was placed under surveillance.

Woikin remained oblivious to the investigation. In mid-September, 1945, Lida told Woikin that they could no longer meet due to "some trouble," but she did not elaborate further. On September 28, Woikin was transferred back to the passport division – without explanation – where she no longer had access to secret information.

Woikin continued as normal. In September 1945, she enrolled at Ottawa Technical School for night courses. She spent two nights per week studying mathematics and English literature. Another evening during the week was spent studying oil painting under a private instructor. In January 1946, Woikin went to the Soviet Embassy to apply – unsuccessfully – for Soviet citizenship.

In early 1946, Gouzenko's defection remained a secret. King had been hesitant to get involved out of fear of damaging relations with the Soviet Union and undermining talks about nuclear weapons control. Furthermore, Woikin was a particular embarrassment since he was also serving as Secretary of State for External Affairs and her activities had taken place under his watch. The federal government's legal counsel had also determined it did not have sufficient evidence to prosecute most of the individuals identified by Gouzenko. In addition, the Soviet Union had largely ceased its espionage activities within Canada following Gouzenko's defection and the suspects posed no immediate threat to Canadian security.

However, on February 3, 1946, the defection was made public when Drew Pearson, an NBC Radio host, disclosed that a Soviet agent had surrendered to Canadian authorities and that Canada was quietly investigating a Soviet spy ring. On February 5, King hurriedly launched a royal commission – chaired by Supreme Court Justices Roy Kellock and Robert Taschereau – to investigate Gouzenko’s information and offer recommendations on how to counter Soviet espionage.

=== Detention ===
At around 6:00 a.m. on February 15, 1946, four RCMP officers showed up at Woikin's rooming house on Somerset Street East. Woikin was detained (Note: Woikin was "detained" and not "arrested." Since no formal charges were being laid, the usual warnings about self-incrimination were not required.) along with 10 other suspects in a series of raids across Ottawa, Montreal, and Kingston. Two others were detained the following day.

Woikin was held in a military barracks at Rockcliffe and was denied access to her family or a lawyer. Throughout her detainment, Woikin was kept isolated and was forbidden from speaking to the guards or the other detainees. The windows at the facility had been boarded up and the lights were left on 24 hours per day. The barracks were "bathed in the glare of search-lights" and guards were issued live ammunition. Each detainee was kept under suicide watch.

Woikin was one of the first to be targeted for interrogation. She was shown the four transcribed cables Gouzenko had turned over. She admitted she had written them and told the interrogating officer everything about her involvement with Sokolov. In a telegram to MI6 dated February 23, the RCMP noted:

This is a pathetic case. Canadian of Russian parentage, she lived in considerable poverty. Her newborn child apparently died of lack of medical care and her husband committed suicide. In resultant nervous condition she was therefore fair game to diplomatic representatives of Soviet Union – particularly after she had found employment in cipher room of External Affairs. Conscious of her origins and vaguely believing she might assist political system, under which she was led to believe poverty did not exist, she agreed to work for them.

Woikin appeared – without a lawyer – before the Royal Commission on Espionage on February 22. She was not informed that she would face criminal charges or that her testimony could later be used against her. She was questioned about her relationship with Sokolov, her application to transfer to the Canadian embassy in Moscow, her attempt to procure Soviet citizenship, and the August 1945 incident where she left the transcribed cables in the toilet tank.

=== Trial and sentencing ===
Woikin following a court appearance in March 1946. On the left is her lawyer, J.P. Erichsen-Brown and on the right is her brother, John Konkin.

On March 4, 1946, the Commission released an interim report publicly identifying four of the detainees: Woikin, Gordon Lunan, Edward Wilfred Mazerall, and Kathleen Mary Willsher. That same day, all four were released from Rockcliffe and then arrested and brought to an arraignment in Ottawa. Woikin was charged with two counts of violating the Official Secrets Act: conspiracy to provide secret information to the Soviet Union and having provided the information. Each of the two charges carried a maximum sentence of seven years' imprisonment – to be served concurrently or consecutively at the judge's discretion – and a fine of up to $2,000. The Crown had determined it could not pursue charges of treason since the information had been shared with the Soviet Union, which was Canada's ally at the time.

Woikin refused counsel – likely to avoid saddling her family with the legal expenses – and did not present a defence. Of the four detainees, she was the only one not represented by a lawyer and the only one to plead guilty. While there was no indication she had been physically intimidated by the RCMP, her behaviour suggested that she had been traumatized by her detention. A report prepared by the Ottawa Civil Liberties Association noted:

She wore no hat and her hair looked as if it had not been combed for days... Emma Woikin looked and acted [as though] she was "in shock." The first charge against her was read. In a flat, unnatural monotone, Mrs. Woikin said "I did it." The magistrate interrupted to ask her if she wished to be represented by counsel. She merely shook her head and repeated over and over, "I did it." He asked her if she understood what had been said. He told her this was a serious charge and she was entitled to have a lawyer or ask for a remand. She shook her head and said, "I did it" to everything that was said to her. The clerk asked her to plead guilty or not guilty. She replied: "I did it." The magistrate tried to explain that she would have to offer a plea one way or another. She kept on repeating the same three words. Finally he was able to get through to her, and she said, in a voice that scarcely [could] be heard: "I did it. I'm guilty."

Woikin was sent to the Ottawa Jail pending a bail hearing where she was granted two phone calls. One was placed to her landlord, whom she asked to deliver her school books to the jail. The second was placed to her family in Blaine Lake. Until that time, they were not aware she was in custody. Her family contacted John Diefenbaker who, at that time, was the member of Parliament for their riding. He referred them to J.P. Erichsen-Brown, an Ottawa-based lawyer. Woikin's brother, John Konkin, travelled to Ottawa to procure Erichsen-Brown's services and put up Woikin's bail money.

Woikin returned to court on March 11, this time accompanied by Erichsen-Brown. The judge allowed Woikin to withdraw her plea, but would not set bail, as she would likely be facing additional charges. On March 12, Woikin learned that she was facing four additional charges: that she "made confidential notes useful to the Russians"; that she "communicated confidential documents to unauthorized persons"; that she "used information for the benefit of the Russians"; and that she "retained confidential notes in her control." On March 14, Woikin was released on a $1,500 bond.

The federal government had been embarrassed by the affair. On April 1, following King's announcement to the House of Commons that his order-in-council had been rescinded, he defended himself against questioning on how Woikin could have earned a position in the civil service, noting how she hailed from a "good family" and had a solid work background. King's government, eager to secure convictions, was pushing its lawyers to bring the first four detainees to trial quickly.

On April 4, four of the six charges against Woikin were dropped after the Crown decided that the original two charges would be sufficient. On April 10, Woikin became the first of the 13 detainees to go to trial and, at the advice of Erichsen-Brown, she pleaded guilty to both charges.

When asked why she had given information to the Sokolovs, Woikin insisted that the information she had shared was given out of a desire to help Russia, rather than harm Canada: "Perhaps it is because I have a feeling of love for that country... We may be wrong or we may be right, but there is hope for the poor there." She explained how she believed that poor people "had a chance" in the Soviet Union, noting how she believed her baby and husband died as a result of poverty. When asked why she wanted to become a Soviet citizen, she acknowledged her knowledge of the Soviet Union was based mostly on books she had read and said she "wanted the facts".

Erichsen-Brown argued for a fine instead of imprisonment. Both Woikin and her brother, John Konkin, made a plea for sympathy, stressing the poverty-stricken nature of their youth. Even the prosecutor requested the judge take into consideration "the fact that as a young person she underwent tragic and unfortunate experiences." However, the judge rejected this plea, saying:

You were brought to Ottawa and given an opportunity. You took an oath of secrecy and you violated it in a deliberate manner... You were fully aware of what you were doing.

On April 12, Woikin was given two sentences of two years and six months – to be served concurrently – at Kingston Penitentiary, becoming the first woman imprisoned for espionage in Canada. Woikin requested to serve her sentence in her native Saskatchewan, rather than Ontario. However, since her sentence exceeded two years, it had to be served in a federal prison and Kingston Penitentiary was the only federal prison that accommodated women. In June, she was sentenced to an additional six months on a contempt of court charge when she refused to testify in the Fred Rose trial.

=== Implications ===
There is no indication that Woikin provided the Soviets with any useful information. The cables she shared were largely limited to information that was already widely available in the press. Furthermore, she had not shared the codes used by the British foreign office, something that would have been far more valuable. Indeed, in a 1960s interview, Peter Dwyer, an MI6 agent who had been closely involved in the Gouzenko investigation, noted that the only significant spy uncovered by Gouzenko was Alan Nunn May, a British physicist who supplied the Soviets with a small sample of enriched uranium-233. "The rest," he added, "was crap." However, the Gouzenko Affair damaged relations with the Soviet Union, stoked anti-communist sentiment in Canada, and is considered by historians to have marked the beginning of the Cold War in Canada.

== Later life ==
Woikin was released from prison in August 1948 at the age of 27 after serving more than two years. Her sentence was reduced for good behaviour at a rate of six days for each month served in the first year of imprisonment and 10 days for each month served in the second, for a total of 34 weeks. She promptly returned to Saskatchewan and, in January 1949, she moved to Saskatoon where she found work at a drugstore.

On March 5, 1949, Woikin married Lucas "Louis" Sawula, a Ukrainian-born employee of the Canadian National Railway, and became Emma Sawula.

In 1951, Woikin was hired as a legal secretary at Kyle, Ferguson, and Hnatyshynat, a law firm that included John Hnatyshyn, who would later become a senator, and his son, Ray Hnatyshyn, who would go on to serve as governor general of Canada. For years following her release from prison, RCMP officers dressed in civilian clothing would show up to ask her colleagues about her political activities and whether she had made any comments about the government. She later moved to another law firm, Cuelenaere, Beaubier, Walters, Kendall and Fisher.

In 1967, Trofem Kurchenko, a man whom some suspected was Woikin's biological father, died and left her his entire estate. Woikin used the proceeds from her inheritance to visit Russia in 1969. Upon her return, she began drinking heavily. While her family never determined the cause of her abrupt change in behaviour, her brother said in a later interview that he suspected she had been crushed upon witnessing the country's social conditions and her visit had shattered the illusion that the Soviet Union was a paragon of social justice. He noted how she once told her family, "When you get there and see for yourself, it's not true."

By 1973, Woikin's health began to deteriorate quickly. In November, she was rushed to hospital after collapsing where the doctor who examined her determined she was suffering from anorexia and depression. Her liver was distended and the doctor wrote in her file, "alcohol suspected but not admitted." On April 9, 1974, she was admitted to St. Paul's Hospital with jaundice and an enlarged liver, a common symptom of alcoholism. She became despondent and would not allow visitors. Woikin died in hospital on May 22 at the age of 53. An autopsy concluded she had died from "florid fatty cirrhosis with pulmonary edema. The body was that of a thin, limp, jaundiced woman."
