= Sam Carr =

Canadian communist activist (1906–1989)

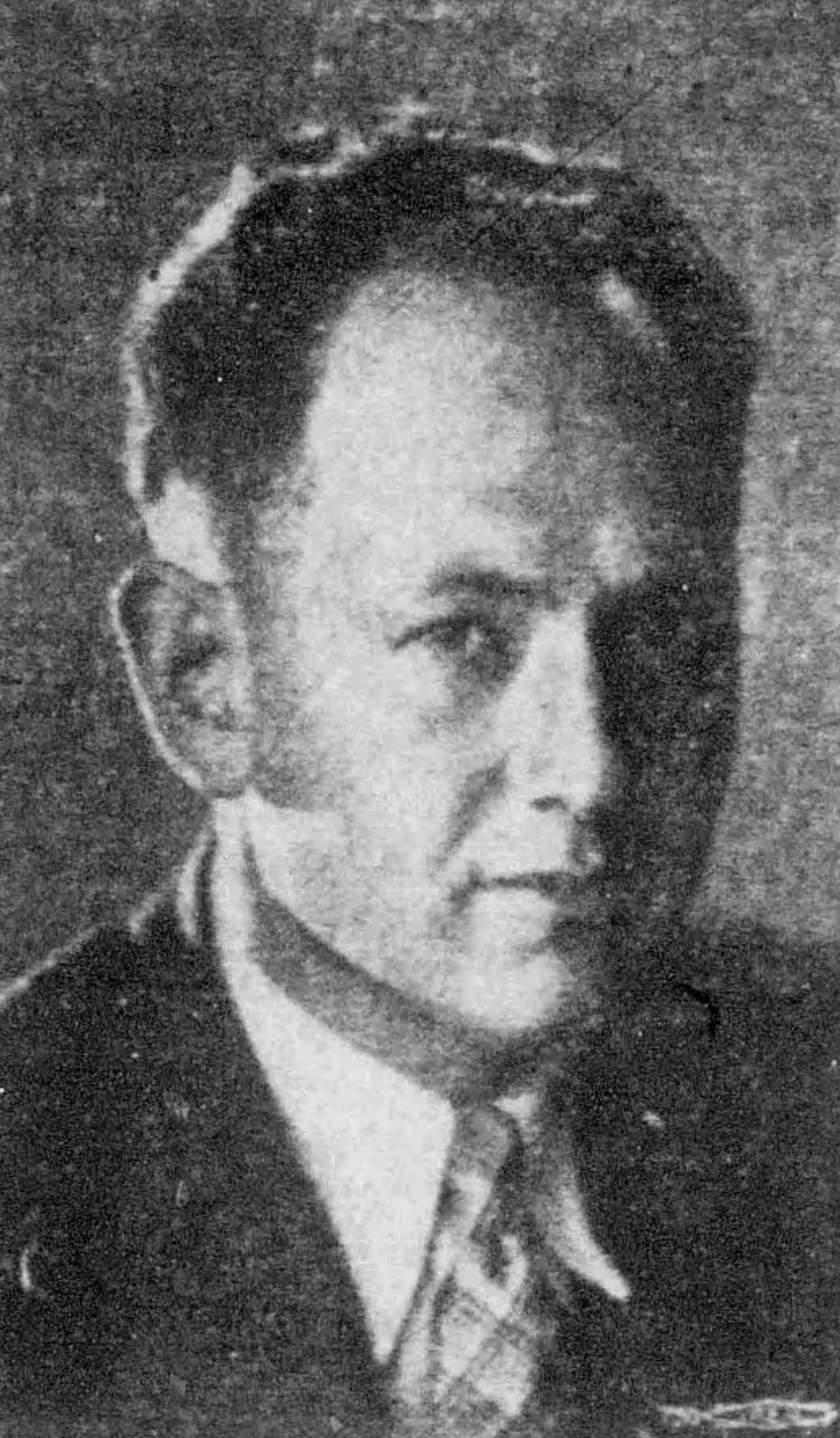
- Carr c. 1938
- Born: Schmil Kogan; July 7, 1906; Tomashpil, Russian Empire
- Died: 1989 (aged 81–82)
- Other name: George Lewis
- Occupations: Political activist, journalist
- Political party: Communist Party of Canada
- Other political affiliations: Labor-Progressive Party

Sam Carr (July 7, 1906 – 1989) was an organizer for the Communist Party of Canada and its successor, the Labor-Progressive Party, in the 1930s and 1940s. He was born Schmil Kogan in Tomashpil, Ukraine, in 1906 and immigrated to Canada in 1924, living in Winnipeg and Regina before settling in Montreal in 1925. Carr became an organizer for the Young Communist League with Fred Rose.

== Biography ==
In 1931, Carr was arrested with other Communist Party leaders and detained in Kingston Penitentiary for 30 months for being an officer in the party, which had been declared illegal that year. Following his release from prison he was an organizer of the 1935 On to Ottawa Trek.

He was the editor of the Communist Party's newspaper, The Clarion, before fleeing to the United States with other party leaders in 1940 when the party was again declared illegal. In 1942, following the German invasion of the USSR, those party leaders who had gone underground, including Carr and Tim Buck, turned themselves in to the authorities. They released after ten days on the promise that they would refrain from communist activities. As a result, the Labor-Progressive Party was formed in 1943 as a legal front for the party; Carr became its national organizer.

In 1946, after a cypher clerk in the Soviet embassy in Ottawa, Igor Gouzenko, defected to Canada, a warrant was issued for Carr's arrest and he again fled to the United States. A Royal Commission on Espionage was called to investigate his activities. In 1949 he was found guilty of conspiracy to obtain a false passport, and was imprisoned for seven years. Carr was one of the principal recruiters of spies for the USSR in Canada.

By the time of his release from prison, Carr was no longer a member of the Labor-Progressive Party, but became active in the left wing organization United Jewish Peoples' Order (UJPO) until his death in 1989. He wrote for the UJPO magazine under the pen name George Lewis.

His nephew was broadcaster Percy Saltzman.
