= Agatha Chapman =

British economist

- Born: 6 May 1907; England
- Died: 17 October 1963 (aged 56); Montreal

Academic background
- Influences: Richard Stone; Keynes; Marx

Academic work
- Discipline: Economics
- School or tradition: National accounts
- Notable ideas: National accounts

Agatha Louisa Chapman (6 May 1907 – 17 October 1963) was a British-born economist at the Canadian Bureau of National Statistics from 1942 to 1947. She was one of two women to attend the first United Nations Sub-Committee on National Income Statistics in 1945, which led to the United Nations System of National Accounts.

== Early life ==
Agatha Chapman was born in England in 1907, and immigrated to Canada in 1918. She came from a well-connected family. Her father had been a high court judge in India, while her uncle William Johnston Tupper had been Lieutenant Governor of Manitoba. She was also the great-granddaughter of Sir Charles Tupper, a Father of Confederation, premier of Nova Scotia from 1864 to 1867 and, briefly in 1896, sixth prime minister of Canada.

Chapman received a B.A. in commerce from the University of British Columbia, and subsequently, in 1931, a master's degree. After working for an insurance company in Montreal, she joined the Bank of Canada in 1940.

== Career ==
She was one of the first, if not the first, woman economist hired by the fledgling central bank, which itself had only been operating five years. Despite being a woman in a then male-dominated profession at a time when the bank required female employees to resign upon marriage, Chapman excelled. In 1942, she was seconded to the Dominion Bureau of Statistics, the forerunner of Statistics Canada, to join a team set up to develop Canada's national accounts from scratch. The "national accounts" provide estimates of a country's economic activity, broadly measuring the income and expenditures of key economic agents, such as consumers, corporations and governments. Following the Great Depression, the development of an accurate set of national accounts was a prerequisite for governments seeking to support and sustain a high level of economic activity. In this exceedingly important area of economic research, Chapman quickly became one of Canada's leading experts.

She was one of two women to attend the first United Nations Sub-Committee on National Income Statistics in 1945, which led to the United Nations System of National Accounts. She so impressed economist Richard Stone with her grasp of national accounting that he insisted her name be added to the official report of the meeting. The work of the sub-committee in which she took part gave rise to the U.N.'s System of National Accounts.

== Gouzenko affair ==
In July 1946, she was identified by the Kellock-Taschereau Commission into espionage as a member of a communist cell, and of having aided the transmission of secret information to the Soviet Union. The Royal Commission had been called by Prime Minister Mackenzie King in early 1946 to examine allegations of a Soviet spy ring operating in Canada involving military and government officials by Igor Gouzenko, a Russian cipher clerk stationed in Ottawa, who had defected the previous year. The affair, with Gouzenko exposing Canadians spying for the Soviets, was often credited as a triggering event for the Cold War.

Testifying at Commission hearings, Chapman admitted to being a member of a number of study groups discussing among other things, socialist and Marxist literature. These meetings were frequented by most of the people of interest to the committee, including Fred Rose, the communist federal MP for the Montreal riding of Cartier, whose names had come up in documents provided by Gouzenko, or in later testimony. Chapman also admitted to being a member of the Canadian Soviet Friendship Council, though this was nothing unusual at the time as the Russians had been viewed as close allies during the war, deserving Canadian support.

A day after the Kellock-Taschereau Commission had revealed her name in its final report filed on 15 July 1946, Chapman was suspended with pay from her job at the Bureau. With rumours about her alleged spy activities swirling around Ottawa, she successfully petitioned the Minister of Justice Louis St. Laurent for a trial so that she could clear her name and restore her reputation. She was formally charged on 18 September 1946, and surrendered to police the next day to be arraigned before a magistrate and released on $2,000 bail. After only 4 ½ hours of testimony, County Court Judge A.G. McDougall dismissed the case against the 39-year-old economist, agreeing with the defence counsel that "there was no evidence on which a jury could possibly have convicted." Most tellingly, Gouzenko himself did not recall her name in Soviet documents, and did not recognise her despite living on the same street.

Although Chapman was acquitted, she was ostracised from the Canadian Civil Service. She had hoped to get back to working on Canada's national accounts but this was not to be. During the crisis, she had applied for a permanent position at the Dominion Bureau of Statistics to do essentially what she had already been doing. Although the job competition was delayed until after she had been cleared, the position was given to a less qualified and less experienced man. The Bank of Canada also failed to support her, and Chapman quit. She stated, "Despite my acquittal by the courts, I find it impossible to continue satisfactorily to work in my own field at present." Fortunately, her former boss and friend at the Bureau put her in touch with Cambridge University in England which quickly hired her so that she could continue her national accounting research.

She went on to spend three years at Cambridge University when it was the epicentre of postwar national accounting. Chapman wrote a study of British wages and salaries in the interwar period, which was published in 1953 by Cambridge University Press as Wages and Salaries in the United Kingdom, 1920–1938. She returned to Montreal to work in a left-wing research consultancy with another former Bank of Canada employee and fellow exonerated accused spy, Eric Adams. Their firm applied National Accounting to the needs of unions and workers.

== Personal life ==
After her return to Canada, Chapman married an American advertising executive who had fled the McCarthyism of his native United States. They lived a hand-to-mouth existence.

== Death ==
Chapman's income dwindled and, suffering from arthritis, she committed suicide on 17 October 1963, aged 56 in Montreal. She jumped to her death from her Bishop Street apartment. There was no mention of her death in the nation's press.

== Works ==
- Agatha L. Chapman, Wages and Salaries in the United Kingdom, 1920–1938. Cambridge University Press. 1953.
