= Otter Lake (Rideau Lakes, Leeds and Grenville United Counties, Ontario) =

- Location within Ontario Location within Canada
- Location: Leeds and Grenville United Counties, Ontario, Canada
- Coordinates: 44.782°N 76.125°W
- Type: lake

Otter Lake is located within the Township of Rideau Lakes. The lake lies close to Highway 15 between the villages of Lombardy and Portland. Because Otter Lake lies more or less in a north–south direction, there are often some spectacular sunrises and sunsets that can be viewed from property owners docks, balconies, and decks.

From the 1870s to the 1950s, the catchment basin was farmed. Some of the first families to settle the area during this period included Anderson, Frayn, Looby, Gillespie, and Wills. Igor Gouzenko, a cipher clerk at the embassy of the Soviet Union in Ottawa, is believed to have hide at a cottage on Otter Lake during October 1945 during his defection to Canada. Between 1953 and 1991, a large degree of naturalization took place with airphotos showing farmland being abandoned and shrub and tree cover replacing open fields. Camp Otterdale was founded in 1955 by the Harrisons at their family cottage on Otter Lake. Today, the development pressure is relatively high on Otter Lake with approximately 330 cottages and 4 commercial properties

Otter Lake is not part of the Rideau Canal system. It is part of the Otter Creek / Hutton Creek Complex which is an area with a large north-eastern drainage pattern towards the mid-part of the Rideau River.

The catchment area draining into the lake is about 36 square km and the shoreline length is about 20 km. The lake is 124 meters above mean sea level and is part of the Rideau River drainage basin. There are several parent streams flowing into Otter Lake and one primary outlet, which is Otter Creek, which meanders about 33 km before flowing into the Rideau River south of Smiths Falls.

Despite its relatively small size, Otter Lake holds a large volume of water and is quite deep, up to 36 m at its deepest location and generally exhibits the characteristics of a mesotrophic lake although the deep bathymetry of the central and southern areas of the lake is more typical of an oligotrophic lake. As a result of its depth, the lake is one of the last lakes in the Rideau Lakes region to freeze in winter, and as a result, the lake is home to a large variety of water fowl.

Lake Trout experienced extirpation from Otter Lake likely in the 1970s. There was a few attempts at stocking Lake Trout but they failed and the program was switched over to Splake in the 1980s and 1990s. Since the 2000s, the lake is no longer stocked with Splake primarily because of low oxygen in deep waters during the summer months.

Otters experienced extirpation from Otter Lake in the first half of the twentieth century likely post 1930s. Anecdotal sightings suggested otters returned to Otter Lake in the mid-2010s with confirmed sightings in 2019 and 2020.

Black rat snakes also experienced extirpation from Otter Lake in the first half of the twentieth century likely post 1930s.

There are numerous natural wetland areas around the lake that are important habitat. Most of these wetlands are classified as "Locally Significant" however some have not yet been evaluated or classified. Wetlands to the east of Otter Lake are classified as "Provincially Significant" and represent an example of "linked wetlands" which allow a more diverse population of wildlife.

Otter Lake abuts the Frontenac Axis of the Canadian Shield on the southwest with part of the lake being underlain by carbonate rock. The carbonate rock on the northeastern shore of Otter Lake is some of the only examples of Cambrian rock in Ontario. Parts of Nepean Sandstone found at surface near Otter Lake form Significant Groundwater Recharge Areas

Otter Lake is also fed by numerous springs although little is known about the volume or source of these springs. Overall, the water in Otter Lake replenishes about every four years by surface runoff, precipitation and springs.

== See also ==
- List of lakes in Ontario
