= Dundonald Park =

Park in Ottawa, Canada

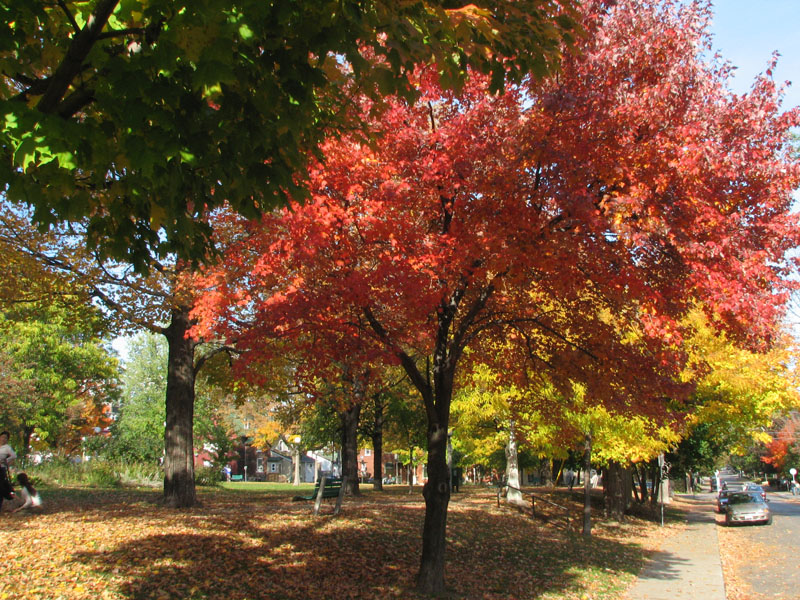
- Fall in the park, seen from the northwest corner
- Interactive map of Dundonald Park
- Type: Urban park
- Location: 516 Somerset Street West; Ottawa, Ontario; K1R 5J9
- Coordinates: 45.4129°N 75.7013°W
- Area: 8,138 square metres (87,600 sq ft)

Dundonald Park is located in the Centretown neighbourhood of Ottawa, Ontario, Canada. It occupies a city block, with Somerset Street West to the north, Bay Street to the west, MacLaren Street to the south, and Lyon Street to the east. It was named after Douglas Cochrane, 12th Earl of Dundonald, who was the last British officer to command the Canadian militia.

In June 2003, the City of Ottawa and in April 2004, the Canadian federal government put up memorial plaques in Dundonald Park commemorating the Soviet defector, Igor Gouzenko. It was from this park that Royal Canadian Mounted Police agents monitored Gouzenko's apartment across the street on the night men from the Soviet embassy came looking for Gouzenko.

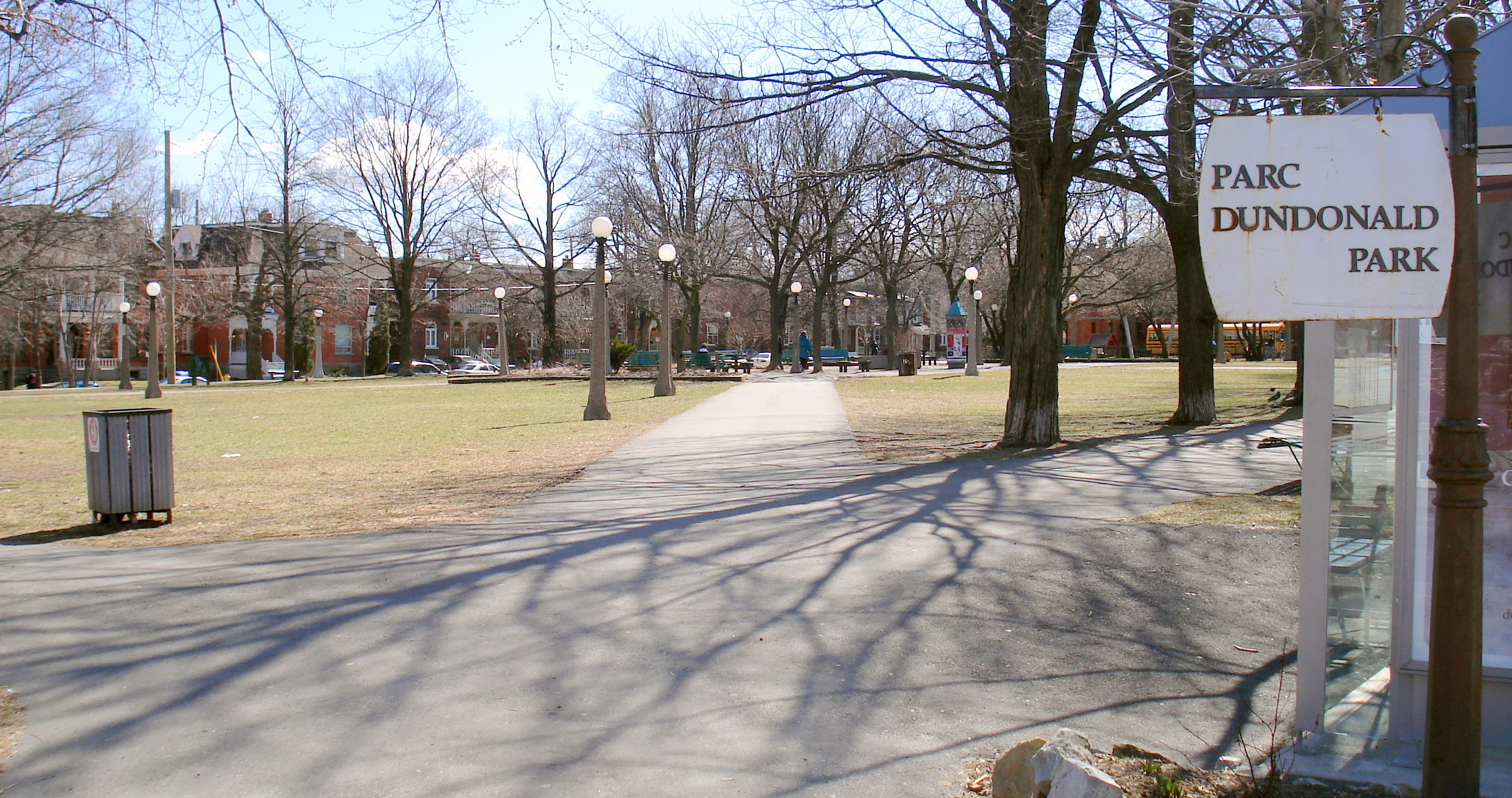
Early spring view of the park from the corner of Somerset and Lyon.

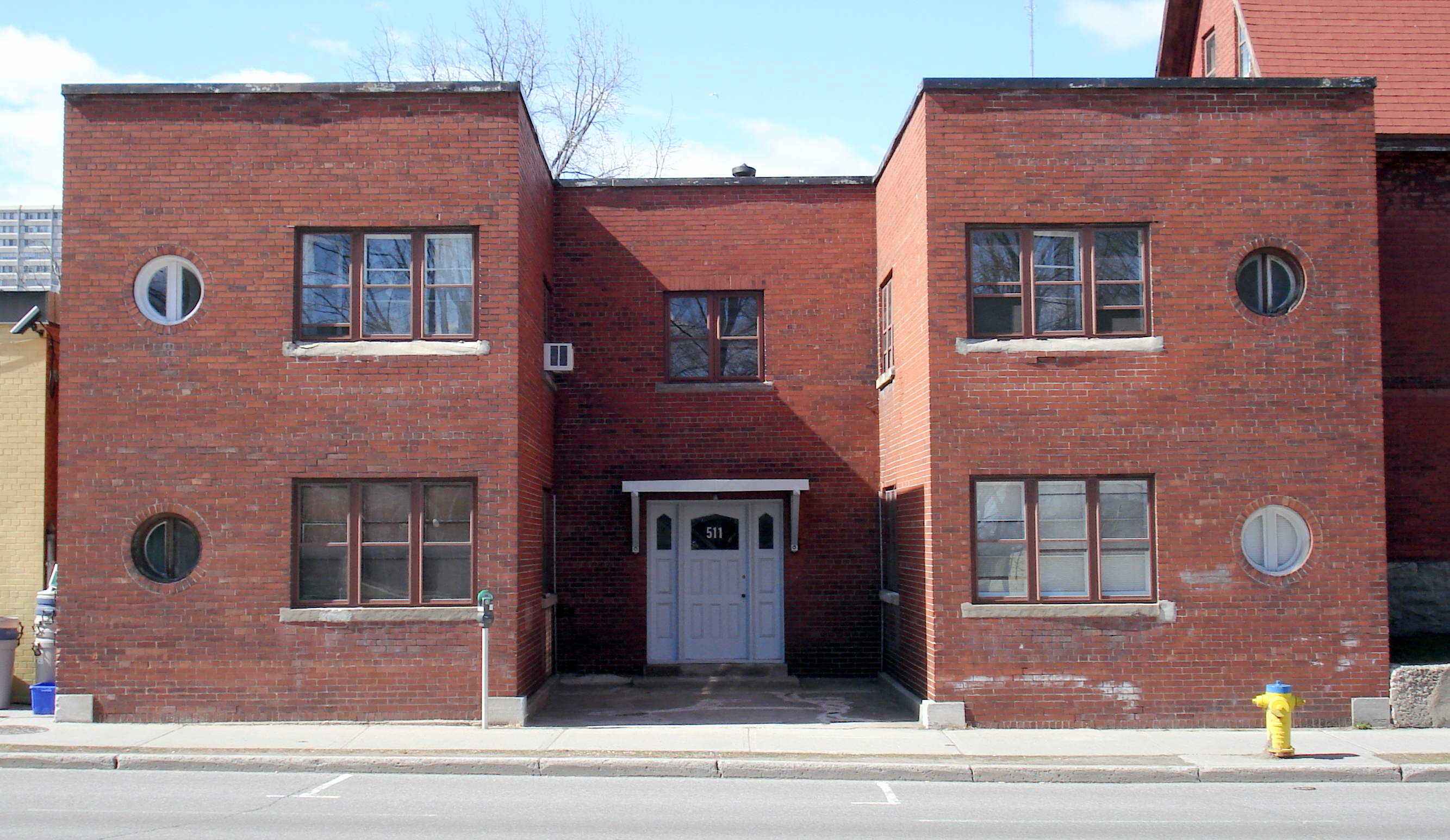
The apartment formerly inhabited by Gouzenko, across Somerset Street.

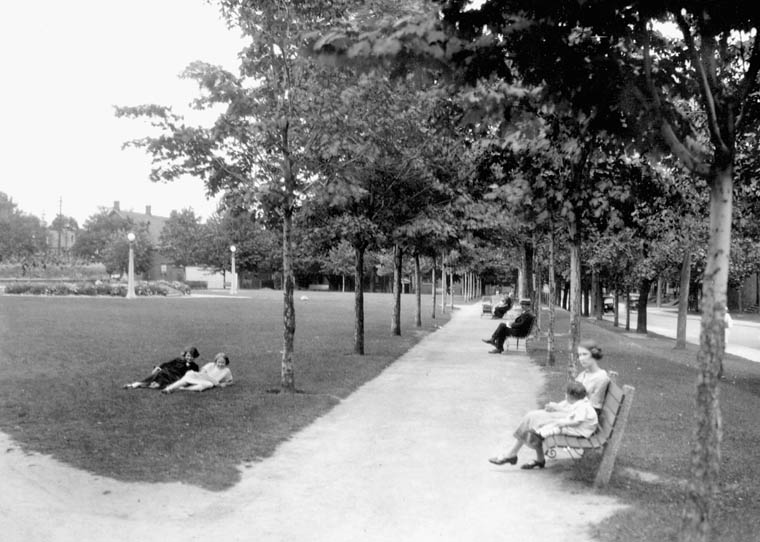
The park in the 1920s.
