= Canada Evidence Act =

Canadian law regulating federal rules of evidence

Parliament of Canada
- Long title: An Act respecting witnesses and evidence
- Citation: R.S.C. 1985, c. C-5
- Enacted by: Parliament of Canada
- Assented to: 1985

The Canada Evidence Act (French: Loi sur la preuve au Canada) is an act of the Parliament of Canada, first passed in 1893, that regulates the rules of evidence in court proceedings under federal law. As law of evidence is largely set by common law, the act is not comprehensive.

The act applies to court proceedings conducted under federal law. The act thus applies in courts and administrative agencies created by the federal Parliament, such as the Federal Court of Canada and the Tax Court of Canada, as well as appeals from those courts to the Federal Court of Appeal and the Supreme Court of Canada. The act also applies in the provincial courts when they hear and determine matters under federal laws, notably under the Criminal Code, a federal statute.

The act does not apply to matters under provincial law. Each province has its own Evidence Act for matters under provincial law. When a matter under provincial law is appealed to the Supreme Court of Canada, the provincial Evidence Act governs, not the federal act. The Canada Evidence Act incorporates the provincial law of evidence to supplement the provisions of the federal act, notably in the law relating to proof of service of documents.
