= Canadian federal election results in Northern Montreal =

Electoral history (since 1968)

Liberal
Bloc Québécois
Progressive Conservative (defunct)

Electoral history (1925–1965) including Laval
Year	Results
1965	
1963	
1962	
1958	
1957	
1953	
1949	
1945	
1940	
1935	
1930	
1926	
1925	

Canadian federal elections have provided the following results in Northern Montreal.

== Regional profile ==
The North End of Montreal has significant immigrant populations and generally supports the Liberals, although the BQ captured Ahuntsic and Bourassa in their 1993 near-sweep of the province, and took Ahuntsic and Papineau in 2006 as the Bloc gained support among immigrant groups. This area was traditionally Liberal until Mulroney's rise to power in 1984, which lowered the Liberals hold on the area to only two seats. The Bloc hoped to gain additional support here to counter any losses in rural Quebec to the Conservatives, who are very weak here.

In the event, however, the region was affected by the NDP "orange wave" that swept through Quebec in 2011. The Liberals retained ridings in Montreal, and the Bloc was left with Ahuntsic as its only seat in the entire Montreal region. In 2015, however, the Liberals swept the entire region, undoubtedly buoyed by Justin Trudeau representing a riding in this region. They maintained their sweep in 2019 and 2021.

=== Votes by party throughout time ===
Election	Liberal	Conservative	New Democratic	Green	People's	PC	Alliance	Bloc Québécois	Social Credit	Others
1979	158,728; 71.0%	—	11,850; 5.3%	—	—	15,895; 7.1%	—	—	21,795; 9.8%	15,169; 6.8%
1980	151,144; 77.4%	—	18,588; 9.5%	—	—	12,159; 6.2%	—	—	4,015; 2.1%	9,282; 4.8%
1984	93,514; 43.0%	—	24,998; 11.5%	—	—	81,597; 37.5%	—	—	383; 0.2%	16,826; 7.7%
1988	100,279; 45.1%	—	27,197; 12.2%	3,936; 1.8%	—	83,719; 37.6%	—	—	447; 0.2%	6,838; 3.1%
1993	109,959; 49.7%	—	3,962; 1.8%	—	—	17,539; 7.9%	—	84,225; 38.1%	—	5,539; 2.5%
1997	115,084; 56.2%	—	4,444; 2.2%	—	—	27,674; 13.5%	—	56,042; 27.4%	—	1,541; 0.8%
2000	113,397; 61.5%	—	4,244; 2.3%	2,251; 1.2%	—	6,615; 3.6%	7,115; 3.9%	47,052; 25.5%	—	3,756; 2.0%
2004	84,937; 49.4%	8,869; 5.2%	10,699; 6.2%	3,963; 2.3%	—	—	—	61,090; 35.5%	—	2,401; 1.4%
2006	77,789; 43.7%	22,554; 12.7%	12,374; 6.9%	5,739; 3.2%	—	—	—	58,752; 33.0%	—	894; 0.5%
2008	77,637; 46.2%	19,231; 11.4%	15,237; 9.1%	4,670; 2.8%	—	—	—	50,641; 30.1%	—	684; 0.4%
2011	60,406; 36.8%	14,136; 8.6%	50,292; 30.7%	2,696; 1.6%	—	—	—	35,500; 21.7%	—	905; 0.6%
2015	103,477; 53.9%	15,217; 7.9%	42,571; 22.2%	4,309; 2.2%	—	—	—	23,781; 12.4%	—	2,642; 1.4%
2019	105,958; 55.3%	14,490; 7.6%	22,200; 11.6%	9,619; 5.0%	1,754; 0.9%	—	—	33,492; 17.5%	—	4,164; 2.2%
2021	100,563; 57.6%	13,413; 7.7%	22,563; 12.9%	3,618; 2.1%	5,294; 3.0%	—	—	28,244; 16.2%	—	883; 0.5%
2025	101,934; 59.3%	26,599; 15.5%	15,322; 8.9%	—	1,264; 0.7%	—	—	25,105; 14.6%	—	1,782; 1.0%

Liberal Conservative New Democratic Bloc Québécois	Green Progressive Conservative (defunct) Alliance / Reform (defunct) Social Credit (defunct)

== Detailed results ==
=== 2021 ===
==== Seats won/lost by party ====
All seats were retained by the Liberal Party.

==== Results by riding ====
Electoral district	Candidates							Incumbent
Electoral district	Liberal	Conservative	BQ	NDP	Green	PPC	Other	Incumbent
Ahuntsic-Cartierville	Mélanie Joly; 26,402; 52.38%	Steven Duarte; 4,247; 8.43%	Anna Simonyan; 11,112; 22.04%	Ghada Chaabi; 5,844; 11.59%	Luc Joli-Coeur; 1,491; 2.96%	Manon Chevalier; 1,313; 2.60%		Mélanie Joly
Bourassa	Emmanuel Dubourg; 22,303; 60.39%	Ilyasa Sykes; 2,587; 7.00%	Ardo Dia; 6,907; 18.70%	Nicholas Ponari; 2,956; 8.00%	Nathe Perrone; 679; 1.84%	Michel Lavoie; 1,349; 3.65%	Michel Prairie (Ind.); 151; 0.41%	Emmanuel Dubourg
Papineau	Justin Trudeau; 22,848; 50.30%	Julio Rivera; 2,198; 4.84%	Nabila Ben Youssef; 6,830; 15.04%	Christine Paré; 10,303; 22.68%	Alain Lepine; 1,448; 3.19%	Christian Boutin; 1,064; 2.34%	Garnet Colly (M-L); 115 0.25%	Justin Trudeau
Papineau	Justin Trudeau; 22,848; 50.30%	Julio Rivera; 2,198; 4.84%	Nabila Ben Youssef; 6,830; 15.04%	Christine Paré; 10,303; 22.68%	Alain Lepine; 1,448; 3.19%	Christian Boutin; 1,064; 2.34%	Raymond Martin (Ind.); 102 0.22%	Justin Trudeau
Papineau	Justin Trudeau; 22,848; 50.30%	Julio Rivera; 2,198; 4.84%	Nabila Ben Youssef; 6,830; 15.04%	Christine Paré; 10,303; 22.68%	Alain Lepine; 1,448; 3.19%	Christian Boutin; 1,064; 2.34%	Béatrice Zako (Ind.); 97 0.21%	Justin Trudeau
Papineau	Justin Trudeau; 22,848; 50.30%	Julio Rivera; 2,198; 4.84%	Nabila Ben Youssef; 6,830; 15.04%	Christine Paré; 10,303; 22.68%	Alain Lepine; 1,448; 3.19%	Christian Boutin; 1,064; 2.34%	Above Znoneofthe (Rhino.); 418 0.92%	Justin Trudeau
Saint-Léonard—Saint-Michel	Patricia Lattanzio; 29,010; 69.38%	Louis Ialenti; 4,381; 10.48%	Laurence Massey; 3,395; 8.12%	Alicia Di Tullio; 3,460; 8.27%		Daniele Ritacca; 1,568; 3.75%		Patricia Lattanzio

=== 2019 ===
==== Seats won/lost by party ====
All seats were retained by the Liberal Party.

==== Results by riding ====
Electoral district	Candidates							Incumbent
Electoral district	Liberal	Conservative	BQ	NDP	Green	PPC	Other	Incumbent
Ahuntsic-Cartierville	Mélanie Joly; 28,904; 52.45%	Kathy Laframboise; 4,013; 7.28%	André Parizeau; 11,974; 21.73%	Zahia El-Masri; 6,284; 11.40%	Jean-Michel Lavarenne; 3,352; 6.08%	Raymond Ayas; 584; 1.06%		Mélanie Joly
Bourassa	Emmanuel Dubourg; 23,231; 57.57%	Catherine Lefebvre; 2,899; 7.18%	Anne-Marie Lavoie; 9,043; 22.41%	Konrad Lamour; 3,204; 7.94%	Payton Ashe; 1,343; 3.33%	Louis Léger; 347; 0.86%	Joseph Di Iorio (Ind.); 212; 0.53% Françoise Roy (M-L); 72; 0.18%	Emmanuel Dubourg
Papineau	Justin Trudeau; 25,957; 51.12%	Sophie Veilleux; 2,155; 4.24%	Christian Gagnon; 8,124; 16.00%	Christine Paré; 9,748; 19.20%	Juan Vazquez; 3,741; 7.37%	Mark Sibthorpe; 322; 0.63%	Jean-Patrick Cacereco Berthiaume (Rhino.); 363; 0.71% Susanne Lefebvre (CHP); 186; 0.37% Luc Lupien (NA); 75; 0.15% Alain Magnan (Ind.); 76; 0.16% Steve Penner (NA); 34; 0.07%	Justin Trudeau
Saint-Léonard—Saint-Michel	Patricia Lattanzio; 27,866; 61.33%	Ilario Maiolo; 5,423; 11.94%	Dominique Mougin; 4,351; 9.58%	Paulina Ayala; 2,964; 6.52%	Alessandra Szilagyi; 1,183; 2.60%	Tina Di Serio; 501; 1.10%	Garnet Colly (M-L); 85; 0.19% Hassan Guillet (Ind.); 3,061; 6.74%	Vacant

=== 2015 ===
==== Seats won/lost by party ====
Party	2011	Gain from (loss to)				2015
Party	2011	Lib.		Bloc		2015
Liberal	3	—		+1	0	4
Bloc Québécois	1	0	(1)	—		0

==== Results by riding ====
Electoral district	Candidates							Incumbent
Electoral district	Conservative	NDP	Liberal	BQ	Green	Marxist-Leninist	Other	Incumbent
Ahuntsic-Cartierville	Wiliam Moughrabi; 4,051; 7.29%	Maria Mourani; 16,684; 30.03%	Mélanie Joly; 26,026; 46.84%	Nicolas Bourdon; 7,346; 13.22%	Gilles Mercier; 1,175; 2.11%		Catherine Gascon-David (Rhino.); 285; 0.51%	Maria Mourani (Note: Mourani sat as an Independent after leaving the BQ; NDP policy did not allow her to join their caucus before the election.); Ahuntsic
Alfred-Pellan	Gabriel Purcarus; 6,259; 11.35%	Rosane Doré Lefebvre; 13,225; 23.97%	Angelo Iacono; 24,557; 44.51%	Daniel St-Hilaire; 9,836; 17.83%	Lynda Briguene; 1,089; 1.97%		Renata Isopo (Ind.); 203; 0.37%	Rosane Doré Lefebvre
Bourassa	Jason Potasso-Justino; 3,819; 9.29%	Dolmine Laguerre; 6,144; 14.94%	Emmanuel Dubourg; 22,234; 54.06%	Gilles Léveillé; 7,049; 17.14%	Maxime Charron; 886; 2.15%	Claude Brunelle; 229; 0.56%	Julie Demers (Ind.); 669 1.63%	Emmanuel Dubourg
Bourassa	Jason Potasso-Justino; 3,819; 9.29%	Dolmine Laguerre; 6,144; 14.94%	Emmanuel Dubourg; 22,234; 54.06%	Gilles Léveillé; 7,049; 17.14%	Maxime Charron; 886; 2.15%	Claude Brunelle; 229; 0.56%	Jean-Marie Floriant Ndzana (SD); 99 0.24%	Emmanuel Dubourg
Laval—Les Îles	Roland Dick; 9,811; 18.10%	François Pilon; 10,710; 19.76%	Fayçal El-Khoury; 25,857; 47.70%	Nancy Redhead; 6,731; 12.42%	Faiza R'Guiba-Kalogerakis; 921; 1.70%	Yvon Breton; 175; 0.32%		François Pilon
Marc-Aurèle-Fortin	Nicolas Makridis; 6,498; 11.92%	Marie-Josée Lemieux; 12,827; 23.52%	Yves Robillard; 22,323; 40.94%	Patrice Jasmin-Tremblay; 11,820; 21.68%	Lorna Mungur; 1,057; 1.94%			Alain Giguère‡
Papineau	Yvon Vadnais; 2,390; 4.71%	Anne Lagacé Dowson; 13,132; 25.87%	Justin Trudeau; 26,391; 51.98%	Maxime Claveau; 6,182; 12.18%	Danny Polifroni; 1,443; 2.84%	Peter Macrisopoulos; 142; 0.28%	Beverly Bernardo (NA) (Note: Bernardo was a candidate for the Communist League, which is not a registered political party and ineligible to be listed on the ballot. Being listed as No Affiliation means that she left the party affiliation section of her candidate registration empty.); 103 0.20%	Justin Trudeau
Papineau	Yvon Vadnais; 2,390; 4.71%	Anne Lagacé Dowson; 13,132; 25.87%	Justin Trudeau; 26,391; 51.98%	Maxime Claveau; 6,182; 12.18%	Danny Polifroni; 1,443; 2.84%	Peter Macrisopoulos; 142; 0.28%	Tommy Gaudet (Rhino.); 323 0.64%	Justin Trudeau
Papineau	Yvon Vadnais; 2,390; 4.71%	Anne Lagacé Dowson; 13,132; 25.87%	Justin Trudeau; 26,391; 51.98%	Maxime Claveau; 6,182; 12.18%	Danny Polifroni; 1,443; 2.84%	Peter Macrisopoulos; 142; 0.28%	Chris Lloyd (Ind.); 505 0.99%	Justin Trudeau
Papineau	Yvon Vadnais; 2,390; 4.71%	Anne Lagacé Dowson; 13,132; 25.87%	Justin Trudeau; 26,391; 51.98%	Maxime Claveau; 6,182; 12.18%	Danny Polifroni; 1,443; 2.84%	Peter Macrisopoulos; 142; 0.28%	Kim Waldron (Ind.); 159 0.31%	Justin Trudeau
Saint-Léonard—Saint-Michel	Jean Philippe Fournier; 4,957; 11.13%	Rosannie Filato; 6,611; 14.85%	Nicola Di Iorio; 28,826; 64.73%	Steeve Gendron; 3,204; 7.19%	Melissa Miscione; 805; 1.81%	Arezki Malek; 128; 0.29%		Massimo Pacetti (Note: Excluded from Liberal caucus on 5 November 2014. Sat as an Independent until end of legislature.)
Vimy	Anthony Mavros; 7,262; 13.36%	France Duhamel; 11,391; 20.96%	Eva Nassif; 25,082; 46.15%	Barek Kaddouri; 9,068; 16.69%	José Núñez Melo; 1,280; 2.36%		Brian Jenkins (CHP); 260; 0.48%	José Núñez Melo (Note: Sat as NDP at dissolution; joined GPC after writ was issued.); Laval

=== 2011 ===
==== Seats won/lost by party ====
Party	2008	Gain from (loss to)			2011
Party	2008	Lib.	Bloc		2011
Liberal	3	—	0	0	3
Bloc Québécois	1	—	0	0	1

==== Results by riding ====
Electoral district	Candidates							Incumbent
Electoral district	BQ	Conservative	Liberal	NDP	Green	Marxist-Leninist	Other	Incumbent
Ahuntsic	Maria Mourani; 14,908; 31.80%	Constantin Kiryakidis; 3,770; 8.04%	Noushig Eloyan; 13,087; 27.91%	Chantal Reeves; 14,200; 30.29%	Ted Kouretas; 620; 1.32%		Jean-Olivier Berthiaume (Rhino); 299; 0.64%	Maria Mourani
Bourassa	Daniel Mailhot; 6,105; 16.06%	David Azoulay; 3,354; 8.82%	Denis Coderre; 15,550; 40.91%	Julie Demers; 12,270; 32.28%	Tiziana Centazzo; 613; 1.61%	Geneviève Royer; 121; 0.32%		Denis Coderre
Papineau	Vivian Barbot; 11,091; 25.93%	Shama Chopra; 2,021; 4.73%	Justin Trudeau; 16,429; 38.41%	Marcos Radhames Tejada; 12,102; 28.29%	Danny Polifroni; 806; 1.88%	Peter Macrisopoulos; 228; 0.53%	Joseph Young (NA); 95; 0.22%	Justin Trudeau
Saint-Léonard—Saint-Michel	Alain Bernier; 3,396; 9.36%	Riccardo De Ioris; 4,991; 13.76%	Massimo Pacetti; 15,340; 42.30%	Roberta Peressini; 11,720; 32.32%	Michael Di Pardo; 657; 1.81%	Garnet Colly; 162; 0.45%		Massimo Pacetti

=== 2008 ===
==== Seats won/lost by party ====
Party	2006	Gain from (loss to)				2008
Party	2006	Lib.		Bloc		2008
Liberal	2	—		+1	0	3
Bloc Québécois	2	0	(1)	—		1

==== Party rankings ====
For the first time since its creation the Bloc arrives third in a riding of the region, whereas the Conservatives score a second place, albeit well behind the Liberals (Saint-Léonard—Saint-Michel).

Parties	1st	2nd	3rd	4th	5th
Liberal	3	1	0	0	0
Bloc Québécois	1	2	1	0	0
Conservative	0	1	2	1	0
New Democratic	0	0	1	3	0
Green	0	0	0	0	4

==== Results by riding ====
Electoral district	Candidates						Incumbent
Electoral district	BQ	Conservative	Liberal	NDP	Green	Other	Incumbent
Ahuntsic	Maria Mourani; 18,815; 39.49%	Jean Précourt; 4,937; 10.36%	Eleni Bakopanos; 18,392; 38.60%	Alexandra Bélec; 4,276; 8.97%	Lynette Tremblay; 1,228; 2.58%		Maria Mourani
Alfred-Pellan	Robert Carrier; 20,686; 38.83%	Alexandre Salameh; 8,626; 16.26%	Wilson Saintelmy; 15,594; 29.27%	Cynthia Roy; 6,406; 12.03%	Tristan Desjardins Drouin; 1,665; 3.13%	Régent Millette (Ind.); 259; 0.49%	Robert Carrier
Bourassa	Daniel Mailhot; 10,145; 25.42%	Michelle Allaire; 5,405; 13.55%	Denis Coderre; 19,869; 49.79%	Samira Laouni; 3,188; 7.99%	François Boucher; 1,166; 2.92%	Geneviève Royer (M-L); 130; 0.33%	Denis Coderre
Laval	Nicole Demers; 19,085; 37.80%	Jean-Pierre Bélisle; 9,101; 18.02%	Alia Haddad; 14,190; 28.10%	Alain Giguère; 6,289; 12.46%	Eric Madelein; 1,607; 3.18%	Yvon Breton (M-L); 221; 0.44%	Nicole Demers
Laval—Les Îles	Mohamedali Jetha; 12,576; 23.55%	Agop Evereklian; 11,017; 20.63%	Raymonde Folco; 21,603; 40.45%	Zahia El-Masri; 6,124; 11.47%	Brent Niel; 1,752; 3.28%	Sylvain A. Trottier (Rhino.); 336; 0.63%	Raymonde Folco
Marc-Aurèle-Fortin	Serge Ménard; 25,552; 45.53%	Claude Moreau; 7,759; 13.82%	Robert Frégeau; 13,728; 24.46%	Benoît Beauchamp; 6,907; 12.31%	Lise Bissonnette; 2,178; 3.88%		Serge Ménard
Papineau	Vivian Barbot; 16,535; 38.69%	Mustaque Sarker; 3,262; 7.63%	Justin Trudeau; 17,724; 41.47%	Costa Zafiropoulos; 3,734; 8.74%	Ingrid Hein; 1,213; 2.84%	Mahmood Raza Baig (Ind.); 267; 0.62%	Vivian Barbot
Saint-Léonard—Saint-Michel	Farid Salem; 5,146; 13.61%	Lucie Le Tourneau; 5,627; 14.88%	Massimo Pacetti; 21,652; 57.26%	Laura Colella; 4,039; 10.68%	Frank Monteleone; 1,063; 2.81%	Garnet Colly (M-L); 165 0.44%	Massimo Pacetti
Saint-Léonard—Saint-Michel	Farid Salem; 5,146; 13.61%	Lucie Le Tourneau; 5,627; 14.88%	Massimo Pacetti; 21,652; 57.26%	Laura Colella; 4,039; 10.68%	Frank Monteleone; 1,063; 2.81%	Joseph Young (NA); 122 0.32%	Massimo Pacetti

=== 2006 ===
==== Seats won/lost by party ====
Party	2004	Gain from (loss to)				2006
Party	2004	Lib.		Bloc		2006
Liberal	4	—		0	(2)	2
Bloc Québécois	0	+2	0	—		2

==== Party rankings ====
This time the Conservatives records a significant uptick in votes, overtaking the NDP as the main third party in the region.

Parties	1st	2nd	3rd	4th	5th
Liberal	2	2	0	0	0
Bloc Québécois	2	2	0	0	0
Conservative	0	0	4	0	0
New Democratic	0	0	0	4	0
Green	0	0	0	0	4

==== Results by riding ====
Electoral district	Candidates						Incumbent
Electoral district	BQ	Liberal	Conservative	NDP	Green	Other	Incumbent
Ahuntsic	Maria Mourani; 19,428; 38.91%	Eleni Bakopanos; 18,594; 37.24%	Étienne Morin; 6,119; 12.26%	Caroline Desrosiers; 3,948; 7.91%	Lynette Tremblay; 1,836; 3.68%		Eleni Bakopanos
Bourassa	Apraham Niziblian; 13,777; 31.97%	Denis Coderre; 18,705; 43.41%	Liberato Martelli; 6,830; 15.85%	Stefano Saykaly; 2,237; 5.19%	François Boucher; 1,370; 3.18%	Geneviève Royer (M-L); 173; 0.40%	Denis Coderre
Papineau	Vivian Barbot; 17,775; 40.75%	Pierre Pettigrew; 16,785; 38.48%	Mustaque A. Sarker; 3,630; 8.32%	Marc Hasbani; 3,358; 7.70%	Louis-Philippe Verenka; 1,572; 3.60%	Mahmood-Raza Baig (CAP); 185 0.42%	Pierre Pettigrew
Papineau	Vivian Barbot; 17,775; 40.75%	Pierre Pettigrew; 16,785; 38.48%	Mustaque A. Sarker; 3,630; 8.32%	Marc Hasbani; 3,358; 7.70%	Louis-Philippe Verenka; 1,572; 3.60%	Peter Macrisopoulos (M-L); 317 0.73%	Pierre Pettigrew
Saint-Léonard—Saint-Michel	Justine Charlemagne; 7,772; 18.74%	Massimo Pacetti; 23,705; 57.17%	Ercolano Pingiotti; 5,975; 14.41%	Laura Colella; 2,831; 6.83%	Pierre-Louis Parant; 961; 2.32%	Stéphane Chénier (M-L); 219; 0.53%	Massimo Pacetti

=== 2004 ===
==== Seats won/lost by party ====
All seats were retained by the Liberal Party.

==== Party rankings ====
The NDP records a significant uptick in votes the 2004 election, overtaking the newly-merged Conservative Party as the main third party in the region.

Parties	1st	2nd	3rd	4th	5th
Liberal	4	0	0	0	0
Bloc Québécois	0	4	0	0	0
New Democratic	0	0	3	1	0
Conservative	0	0	1	3	0
Green	0	0	0	0	4

==== Results by riding ====
Electoral district	Candidates								Incumbent
Electoral district	Liberal	BQ	Conservative	NDP	Green	Marijuana	Marxist-Leninist	Other	Incumbent
Ahuntsic	Eleni Bakopanos; 21,234; 43.76%	Maria Mourani; 20,020; 41.25%	Jean E. Fortier; 2,544; 5.24%	Annick Bergeron; 3,013; 6.21%	Lynette Tremblay; 1,301; 2.68%	F.X. De Longchamp; 314; 0.65%	Marsha Fine; 102; 0.21%		Eleni Bakopanos
Bourassa	Denis Coderre; 20,927; 50.03%	Doris Provencher; 15,794; 37.76%	Frédéric Grenier; 2,226; 5.32%	Stefano Saykaly; 1,661; 3.97%	Noémi Lopinto; 660; 1.58%	Philippe Gauvin; 403; 0.96%	Geneviève Royer; 154; 0.37%		Denis Coderre
Papineau	Pierre Pettigrew; 16,892; 41.10%	Martine Carrière; 16,424; 39.96%	Mustaque Sarker; 1,961; 4.77%	André Frappier; 3,603; 8.77%	Adam Jastrzebski; 1,058; 2.57%	Christelle Dusablon-Pelletier; 490; 1.19%	Peter Macrisopoulos; 169; 0.41%	Jimmy Garoufalis (Ind.); 250 0.61%	Pierre Pettigrew; Papineau—Saint-Denis
Papineau	Pierre Pettigrew; 16,892; 41.10%	Martine Carrière; 16,424; 39.96%	Mustaque Sarker; 1,961; 4.77%	André Frappier; 3,603; 8.77%	Adam Jastrzebski; 1,058; 2.57%	Christelle Dusablon-Pelletier; 490; 1.19%	Peter Macrisopoulos; 169; 0.41%	André Parizeau (Comm.); 252 0.61%	Pierre Pettigrew; Papineau—Saint-Denis
Saint-Léonard—Saint-Michel	Massimo Pacetti; 25,884; 63.90%	Paul-Alexis François; 8,852; 21.85%	Payam Eslami; 2,138; 5.28%	Laura Colella; 2,422; 5.98%	Ricardo Fellicetti; 944; 2.33%		Stéphane Chénier; 267; 0.66%		Massimo Pacetti

==== Maps ====
1. Ahuntsic
2. Alfred-Pellan
3. Bourassa
4. Laval
5. Laval-les Îles
6. Marc-Aurèle-Fortin
7. Papineau
8. Saint-Léonard-Saint-Michel
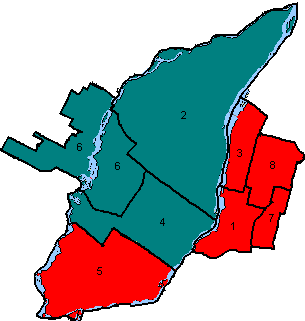
Key map

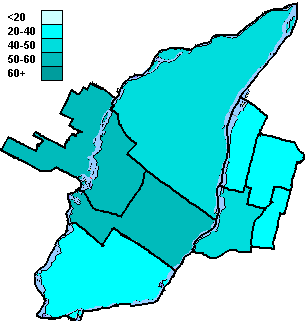
Bloc Québécois

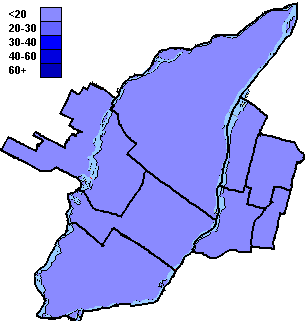
Conservative Party of Canada

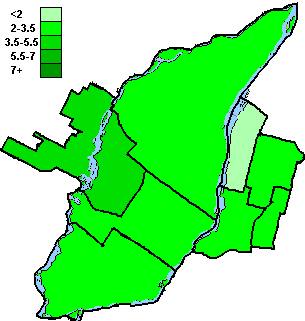
Green Party of Canada

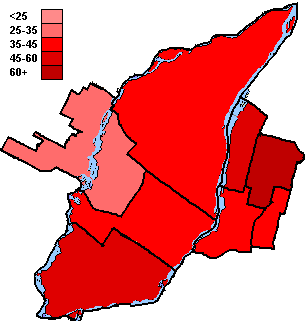
Liberal Party of Canada

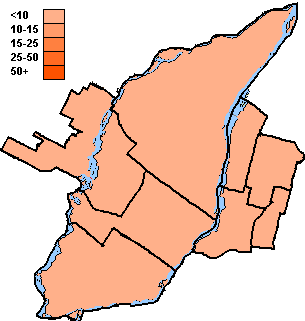
New Democratic Party

=== 2000 ===
==== Seats won/lost by party ====
All seats were retained by the Liberal Party.

==== Party rankings ====
The NDP reaches a low point in the region with a 6th place in Ahuntsic, behind all the major federal parties and the Green Party, its best result being one fourth place in Papineau—Saint-Denis. The Canadian Alliance overtakes the Progressive Conservatives as the main third party, except in Ahuntsic.

Parties	1st	2nd	3rd	4th	5th	6th
Liberal	4	0	0	0	0	0
Bloc Québécois	0	4	0	0	0	0
Alliance	0	0	3	1	0	0
Progressive Conservative	0	0	1	2	1	0
New Democratic	0	0	0	1	2	1
Green	0	0	0	0	1	1

==== Results by riding ====
Electoral district	Candidates								Incumbent
Electoral district	BQ	Liberal	Canadian Alliance	NDP	PC	Green	Marxist-Leninist	Other	Incumbent
Ahuntsic	Fatima El Amraoui; 17,132; 32.23%	Eleni Bakopanos; 28,643; 53.89%	Eugenia Romain; 1,816; 3.42%	Steve Moran; 997; 1.88%	Jessica Chartrand; 3,018; 5.68%	Mimi Ghosh; 1,123; 2.11%	Vincent Dorais; 159; 0.30%	Antonio Artuso (Comm.); 262; 0.49%	Eleni Bakopanos
Bourassa	Umberto Di Genova; 11,462; 28.07%	Denis Coderre; 25,403; 62.22%	Marcel Lys François; 1,435; 3.51%	Richard Gendron; 736; 1.80%	Marcel Pitre; 1,325; 3.25%		Claude Brunelle; 330; 0.81%	Ulises Nitor (Comm.); 137; 0.34%	Denis Coderre
Papineau—Saint-Denis	Philippe Ordenes; 11,779; 26.60%	Pierre Pettigrew; 23,955; 54.10%	Yannis Felemegos; 2,114; 4.77%	Hans Marotte; 1,983; 4.48%	Emmanuel Préville; 1,215; 2.74%	Boris-Antoine Legault; 1,128; 2.55%	Peter Macrisopoulos; 482; 1.09%	Mustaque A. Sarker (Ind.); 738 1.67% Antoine Théorêt-Poupart (Mar.); 886 2.00%	Pierre Pettigrew
Saint-Léonard—Saint-Michel	Marcel Ferlatte; 6,679; 14.47%	Alfonso Gagliano; 35,396; 76.66%	Daniel Champagne; 1,750; 3.79%	Sara Mayo; 528; 1.14%	Mostafa Ben Kirane; 1,057; 2.29%		Yves Le Seigle; 127; 0.28%	Karina Néron (Mar.); 635; 1.38%	Alfonso Gagliano

=== 1997 ===
==== Seats won/lost by party ====
Party	1993	Gain from (loss to)				1997
Party	1993	Lib.		Bloc		1997
Liberal	3	—		+2	0	4 (Note: The riding of Saint-Denis (held by the Liberals) has been dissolved into Ahuntsic.)
Bloc Québécois	2	0	–2	—		0

==== Party rankings ====
Parties	1st	2nd	3rd	4th
Liberal	4	0	0	0
Bloc Québécois	0	4	0	0
Progressive Conservative	0	0	4	0
New Democratic	0	0	0	4

==== Results by riding ====
Electoral district	Candidates					Incumbent
Electoral district	BQ	Liberal	NDP	PC	Other	Incumbent
Ahuntsic	Pauline Charest; 18,689	Eleni Bakopanos; 28,971	Steven Moran; 1,051	Nicole Roy-Arcelin; 9,520	Carmel Bernard (NLP); 589	Michel Daviault (Note: Daviault did not seek reelection); Ahuntsic
Ahuntsic	Pauline Charest; 18,689	Eleni Bakopanos; 28,971	Steven Moran; 1,051	Nicole Roy-Arcelin; 9,520	Carmel Bernard (NLP); 589	Merged districts
Ahuntsic	Pauline Charest; 18,689	Eleni Bakopanos; 28,971	Steven Moran; 1,051	Nicole Roy-Arcelin; 9,520	Carmel Bernard (NLP); 589	Eleni Bakopanos; Saint-Denis
Bourassa	Osvaldo Nunez; 14,813	Denis Coderre; 23,765	Dominique Baillard; 999	Eric Wildhaber; 5,937		Osvaldo Nunez
Papineau—Saint-Denis	Mario Beaulieu; 14,083	Pierre Pettigrew; 26,260	Gaby Kombé; 1,196	Yannis Felemegos; 6,227	Peter Macrisopolous (M-L); 481; Michel Dugré (Ind.); 471	Pierre Pettigrew (Note: Pettigrew elected in a by-election in March 1996); Papineau—Saint-Michel
Saint-Léonard—Saint-Michel	Umberto Di Genova; 8,457	Alfonso Gagliano; 36,088	Pierre J.C. Allard; 1,198	Ronald Gosselin; 5,990		Alfonso Gagliano; Saint-Léonard

=== 1993 ===
==== Seats won/lost by party ====
Party	1988	Gain from (loss to)						1993
Party	1988	PC		Lib.		Bloc		1993
Liberal	3	0	0	—		0	0	3
Progressive Conservative	2	—		0	0	0	(2)	0
Bloc Québécois	0	2	0	0	0	—		2

==== Party rankings ====
Parties	1st	2nd	3rd	4th	5th
Liberal	3	2	0	0	0
Bloc Québécois	2	3	0	0	0
Progressive Conservative	0	0	5	0	0
New Democratic	0	0	0	4	1
Natural Law	0	0	0	1	3

==== Results by riding ====
Electoral district	Candidates							Incumbent
Electoral district	PC	Liberal	NDP	BQ	Natural Law	Commonwealth of Canada	Other	Incumbent
Ahuntsic	Nicole Roy-Arcelin; 4,332	Céline Hervieux-Payette; 20,934	René Samson; 675	Michel Daviault; 22,275	Marc Lacroix; 752	Christiane Deland-Gervais; 332	Haytoug Chamlian (Ind.); 567; Rolando Fusco (Abol.); 385	Nicole Roy-Arcelin
Bourassa	Marie Gibeau; 5,199	Denis Coderre; 18,167	Raymond Laurent; 1,146	Osvaldo Nunez; 18,234	Miville Couture; 479	Harold Anthony Quesnel; 102	Lucien Lapointe (Abol.); 209	Marie Gibeau
Papineau—Saint-Michel	Carmen De Pontbriand; 1,620	André Ouellet; 19,524	Gisèle Charlebois; 694	Daniel Boucher; 14,661	André Beaudoin; 667	Normand Normandeau; 77	Serge Lachapelle (M-L); 141; P.A. D'Aoust (Abol.); 94	André Ouellet
Saint-Denis	Aïda Baghjajian; 2,196	Eleni Bakopanos; 21,883	Josée Panet-Raymond; 969	Gilles Pelchat; 15,274	Alain-Édouard Lord; 400	Benoit Chalifoux; 158	Stéphane Lapointe (Ind.); 423; Fernand Belisle (Abol.); 249; Panagiotis Macrisopoulos (M.L.); 205	Marcel Prud'homme
Saint-Léonard	Tony Tomassi; 4,021	Alfonso Gagliano; 28,799	David D'Andrea; 583	Umberto Di Genova; 12,879	Marlène Charland; 497	Stéphane Levesque; 77	Claude Brunelle (M-L); 141; Mauro Fusco (Abol.); 91	Alfonso Gagliano

=== 1988 ===
==== Party rankings ====
Parties	1st	2nd	3rd
Liberal	3	2	0
Progressive Conservative	2	3	0
New Democratic	0	0	5

==== Results by riding ====
Electoral district	Candidates				Incumbent
Electoral district	PC	Liberal	NDP	Other	Incumbent
Ahuntsic	Nicole Roy-Arcelin; 21,748	Raymond Garneau; 21,056	Vincent Guadagnano; 5,638	2,796	Marie Thérèse Killens; Saint-Michel—Ahuntsic
Bourassa	Marie Gibeau; 18,979	Carlo Rossi; 18,159	Kéder Hyppolite; 4,797	1,847	Carlo Rossi
Papineau—Saint-Michel	Frank Venneri; 13,094	André Ouellet; 18,122	Giovanni Adamo; 5,948	2,236	André Ouellet; Papineau
Saint-Denis	Madeleine Provost; 12,843	Marcel Prud'Homme; 19,928	Jaime Llambias-Wolff; 6,151	3,278	Marcel Prud'Homme
Saint-Léonard	Marc Beaudoin; 17,055	Alfonso Gagliano; 23,014	Michel Roche; 4,663	1,064	Alfonso Gagliano; Saint-Léonard—Anjou

=== 1984 ===
==== Results by riding ====
Electoral district	Candidates				Incumbent
Electoral district	Liberal	PC	NDP	Other	Incumbent
Bourassa	Carlo Rossi; 20,221	Raymond-J. Rochon; 18,703	Roderick Charters; 3,741	3,352	Carlo Rossi
Papineau	André Ouellet; 12,754	Tony Iacobaccio; 12,053	Paul Comtois; 4,295	3,605	André Ouellet
Saint-Denis	Marcel Prud'homme; 18,750	Peter Georgakakos; 12,122	Scott McKay; 4,581	3,257	Marcel Prud'homme
Saint-Léonard—Anjou	Alfonso Gagliano; 24,520	Agostino Cannavino; 23,275	Terrence Trudeau; 7,506	3,931	Monique Bégin
Saint-Michel—Ahuntsic	Marie Thérèse Killens; 17,269	René Paradis; 15,444	Hélène Mongeau; 4,875	3,064	Marie Thérèse Killens; Saint-Michel

=== 1980 ===
==== Results by riding ====
Electoral district	Candidates				Incumbent
Electoral district	Liberal	PC	NDP	Other	Incumbent
Bourassa	Carlo Rossi; 30,924	Raymond J. Rochon; 3,182	Roderick Charters; 5,144	1,180	Carlo Rossi
Papineau	André Ouellet; 22,399	Gérard Hogue; 1,634	Jean-Marc Dompierre; 2,796	3,161	André Ouellet
Saint-Denis	Marcel Prud'homme; 28,383	David M. Bernstein; 2,312	Raymond Beaudoin; 3,485	2,483	Marcel Prud'homme
Saint-Léonard—Anjou	Monique Bégin; 42,228	Thomas Crawford; 2,972	Filippo Salvatore; 3,741	3,114	Monique Bégin
Saint-Michel	Marie Thérèse Killens; 27,210	Jean-Louis Pozza; 2,059	Frank Reiss; 3,422	3,359	Marie Thérèse Killens

=== 1979 ===
==== Results by riding ====
Electoral district	Candidates					Incumbent
Electoral district	Liberal	Social Credit	PC	NDP	Other	Incumbent
Bourassa	Carlo Rossi; 29,929	Gérard Rougeau; 5,178	J. Raymond Rochon; 3,705	Daniel Piotrowski; 1,804	7,250	Jacques Trudel; Montreal—Bourassa
Papineau	André Ouellet; 23,619	Albert Paiement; 4,039	Claudy Mailly; 2,652	Jean A. Richard; 1,913	2,268	André Ouellet
Saint-Denis	Marcel Prud'homme; 30,552	Richer M. Francoeur; 3,177	David Bernstein; 3,380	Richard Marcille; 2,412	1,707	Marcel Prud'homme
Saint-Léonard—Anjou	Monique Bégin; 45,582	Réal Ménard; 5,102	Luciano Coraggio; 3,556	Colette Lalancette-Deschamps; 3,105	1,735	
Saint-Michel	Marie Thérèse Killens; 29,046	John Mitchell; 4,299	Jean-Louis Pozza; 2,602	Filippo Salvatore; 2,616	2,209	Monique Bégin; Saint-Michel
Saint-Michel	Marie Thérèse Killens; 29,046	John Mitchell; 4,299	Jean-Louis Pozza; 2,602	Filippo Salvatore; 2,616	2,209	merged districts
Saint-Michel	Marie Thérèse Killens; 29,046	John Mitchell; 4,299	Jean-Louis Pozza; 2,602	Filippo Salvatore; 2,616	2,209	Jeanne Sauvé; Ahuntsic
