= Justine McIntyre =

Canadian politician

Montreal City Councillor for Bois-de-Liesse
- In office 2013–2017
- Preceded by: Christian Dubois
- Succeeded by: Benoit Langevin

Leader of Vrai changement pour Montréal
- Incumbent
- Assumed office December 23, 2015
- Preceded by: Lorraine Pagé

Personal details
- Party: Liberal (Provincial); Vrai changement pour Montréal (municipal)

Justine McIntyre is a Canadian politician who served on Montreal City Council from 2013 to 2017. She represented the Bois-de-Liesse ward in the borough of Pierrefonds-Roxboro, as a member of the Vrai changement pour Montréal political party.

== Early life ==
A graduate of the music program at McGill University and the management of nonprofit organizations in the arts from the University of Washington, prior to her term on city council McIntyre worked as a classical pianist. She also worked as communications director of an organization for homeless youth, serving on the board of a youth music education program.

In 2022, she earned a post graduate degree from the Université de Montréal's business school, HEC Montréal, specializing in sustainable development.

== Career ==
She was elected to Montreal City Council in the 2013 municipal election. She was most prominent as a voice on environmental issues, including banning the use of neonicotinoid pesticides in the city, as well as opposing a controversial proposed new housing development in Pierrefonds West.

She became the leader of Vrai changement pour Montréal after Lorraine Pagé stepped down in 2015. She led the party into the 2017 municipal election, in which it ran candidates only in the boroughs of Pierrefonds-Roxboro, L'Île-Bizard–Sainte-Geneviève, Lachine, Saint-Laurent and Ville-Marie rather than the citywide slate of 2013. McIntyre herself ran for borough mayor of Pierrefonds-Roxboro rather than for mayor of Montreal, but lost to incumbent borough mayor Dimitrios (Jim) Beis.

Between 2015 and 2026, a series of her opinion pieces were published in the Montreal Gazette on matters of municipal politics, management, and environmental concerns. She has been frequently invited to speak as an expert panelist on the subject of municipal affairs on trusted programs such as Zone Économie hosted by Gérald Fillion, as well as made regular media appearances, including on Radio-Canada radio and on Vaste Programme.

McIntyre transitioned into provincial politics in 2026, running as the official candidate for the Quebec Liberal Party in the Montreal riding of Sainte-Marie–Saint-Jacques.

== Publications ==
McIntyre is a contributing author to Questioning Technology with Jacques Ellul.

== Electoral record ==
2026 Quebec general election: Sainte-Marie–Saint-Jacques
** Preliminary results — Not yet official **
Party	Candidate	Votes	%	±%
Québec solidaire	Roxane Milot	10,921	43.15	
Liberal	Justine McIntyre	6,429	25.40	
Parti Québécois	Philippe Schnobb	5,055	19.97	
Conservative	Antoine Corminboeuf	1,135	4.48	
Coalition Avenir Québec	Eli Zytoon	1,062	4.20	
Green	Lina Zdruli	299	1.18	
Parti nul	Rachël Frenette	115	0.45	
Parti culinaire	Justin Bouchard	91	0.36	
Climat Québec	Dominique Blanchard	65	0.26	
Marxist–Leninist	Linda Sullivan	48	0.19	
Communist	Adrien Welsh	46	0.18	
Bloc Pot	Chinook Blais-Leduc	44	0.17	
Total valid votes				
Total rejected ballots				
Turnout			59.45	
Québec solidaire hold		Swing		+
Source: Élections Québec
