= Parti citron candidates in the 1989 Quebec provincial election =

The Parti citron was a novelty political party that ran eleven candidates in the 1989 Quebec provincial election, none of whom were elected. Information about these candidates may be found on this page.

== Candidates ==
=== Acadie: Christian Coutu ===
Christian Coutu has been a candidate in one provincial and two municipal elections.

Electoral record
Election	Division	Party	Votes	%	Place	Winner
1989 provincial	Acadie	Parti citron	848	2.92	4/5	Yvan Bordeleau, Liberal
1990 municipal	Montreal City Council, Ahuntsic	White Elephant Party	107	1.66	5/5	Alain André, Municipal Party
1994 municipal	Montreal City Council, Ahuntsic	White Elephant Party	128	1.71	6/6	Hasmig Belleli, Vision Montreal

=== Dorion: Pierre Corbeil ===
Pierre Corbeil ran for the Rhinoceros Party of Canada as "Pierre dit Lagaffe Corbeil" in the 1984 Canadian federal election. As a Parti citron candidate in 1989, he said that his party would replace the government of Canada's proposed Meech Lake Accord on Canadian constitutional reform with a "Beaver Lake Accord," named after an artificial lake in Quebec. As Corbeil put it, "Beaver Lake's an artificial lake and we'd like an artificial accord." He also proposed that all public-sector employees be required to dress in yellow after the election "to boost their morale."

Corbeil later ran for the Parti éléphant blanc de Montréal in two municipal elections in the 1990s. He was forty-one years old in 1994 and indicated that his campaign budget that year was only one thousand dollars.

Electoral record
Election	Division	Party	Votes	%	Place	Winner
1984 federal	Saint-Jacques	Rhinoceros	1,204	4.39	4/7	Jacques Guilbault, Liberal
1989 provincial	Dorion	Parti citron	297	1.30	5/6	Violette Trépanier, Liberal
1990 municipal	Montreal City Council, Peter-McGill	White Elephant Party	49	1.50	5/5	Nick Auf der Maur, Municipal Party
1994 municipal	Montreal City Council, Peter-McGill	White Elephant Party	53	1.17	6/6	Georgine Coutu, Vision Montreal
