= Christine St-Pierre =

Canadian politician (born 1953)

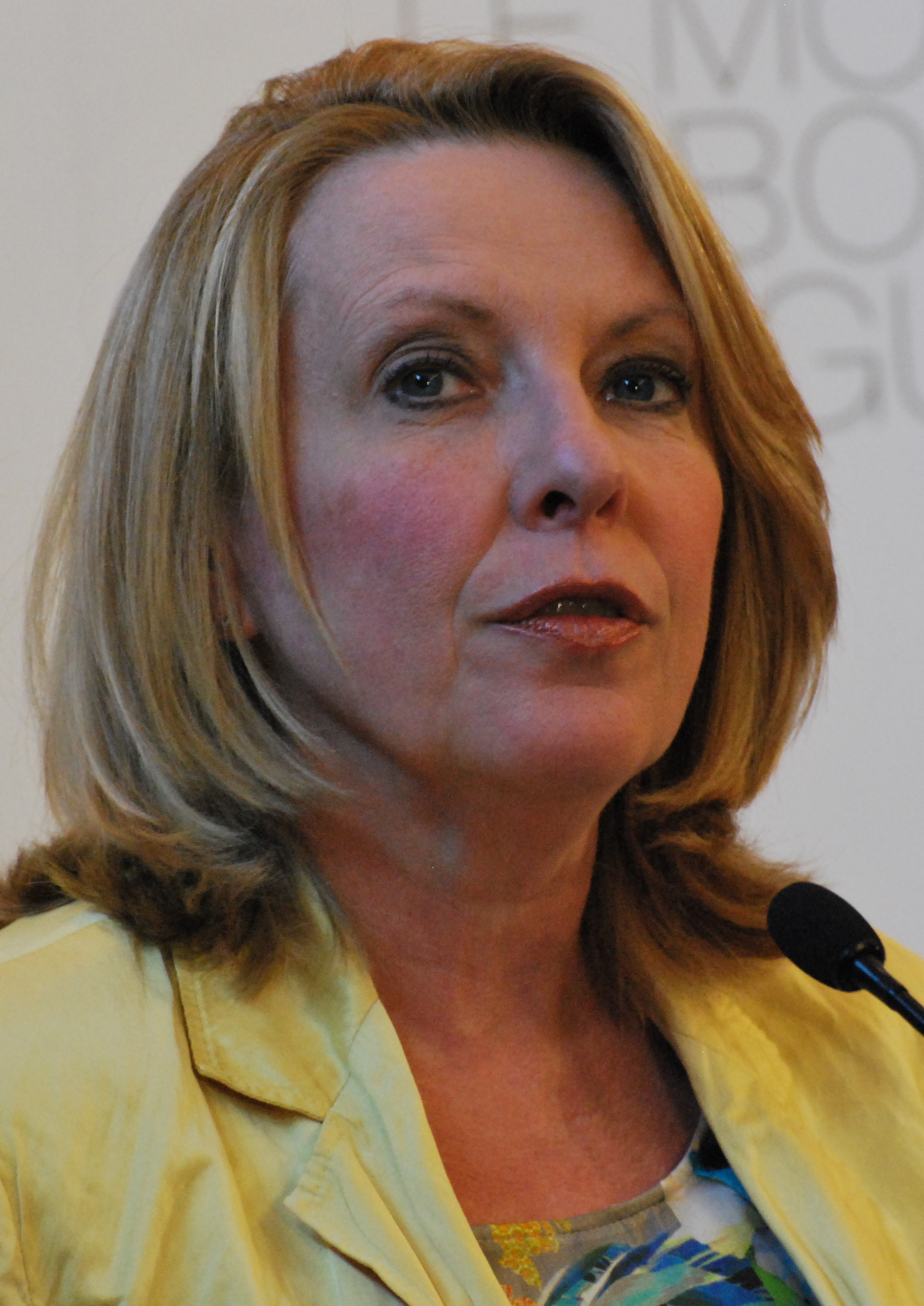
- Christine St-Pierre, in 2012.

Member of the National Assembly of Quebec for Acadie
- In office March 26, 2007 – August 28, 2022
- Preceded by: Yvan Bordeleau
- Succeeded by: André Morin

Personal details
- Born: June 10, 1953 (age 73) Saint-Roch-des-Aulnaies, Quebec
- Party: Quebec Liberal Party
- Profession: Reporter
- Cabinet: Minister of International Relations and La Francophonie

Christine St-Pierre (born June 10, 1953, in Saint-Roch des Aulnaies, Quebec) is a Canadian journalist and politician, who was MNA for the Montreal provincial riding of Acadie from 2007 to 2022 as a member of the Quebec Liberal Party.

== Life and career ==
She holds a Bachelor of Social Science degree from the University of Moncton. Prior to her political career, St-Pierre worked as a journalist for Radio-Canada from 1976 to 2007. She was a political correspondent in Quebec City for five years before working as a correspondent in Washington, D.C. for four years before returning to Canada. During her stint as a political correspondent in Ottawa, she wrote a letter in Montreal's newspaper La Presse praising the Canadian military mission in Afghanistan. She was suspended due to rule infringement because of the statement of her opinion.

St-Pierre entered politics in the 2007 elections and won in Acadie. Jean Charest named her the Minister of Culture and Communications and Status of Women. In late 2011, when the Montreal Canadiens hired interim coach Randy Cunneyworth, she said she expected the Canadiens to rectify the situation as soon as possible as Cunneyworth speaks only English, and no French.

From 18 April 2007 to Septembre 2012, St-Pierre was responsible for Quebec's Charter of the French Language. She stated after she took her oath of office that she would have "zero tolerance" to infractions of Bill 101.

After the Liberals won the election in April 2014, she was named Minister of International Relations and La Francophonie.

== Electoral record ==
2018 Quebec general election: Acadie
Party	Candidate	Votes	%	±%
Liberal	Christine St-Pierre	14,305	53.80	-17.16
Coalition Avenir Québec	Sophie Chiasson	4,391	16.51	+7.57
Québec solidaire	Viviane Martinova-Croteau	3,656	13.75	+7.18
Parti Québécois	Farida Sam	2,394	9.00	-2.68
Green	Laurence Sicotte	737	2.77	+1.58
Conservative	Jocelyn Chouinard	579	2.18	–
New Democratic	Michel Welt	442	1.66	–
Marxist–Leninist	Yvon Breton	87	0.33	+0.13
Total valid votes		26,591	98.50	
Total rejected ballots		406	1.50	
Turnout		26,997	54.17	-15.53
Eligible voters		49,838		
Liberal hold		Swing		-12.37
Source(s) "Rapport des résultats officiels du scrutin". Élections Québec.

2014 Quebec general election
Party	Candidate	Votes	%	±%
Liberal	Christine St-Pierre	24,211	70.96	+15.31
Parti Québécois	Évelyne Abitbol	3,985	11.68	-5.54
Coalition Avenir Québec	Serge Pourreaux	3,050	8.94	-8.52
Québec solidaire	Geneviève Dick	2,241	6.57	-1.44
Green	Alix Nyaburerwa	405	1.19	–
Option nationale	Julie Boivin	162	0.47	-1.19
Marxist–Leninist	Yvon Breton	67	0.20	–
Total valid votes		34,121	99.08	–
Total rejected ballots		318	0.92	–
Turnout		34,459	69.70	+4.94
Electors		49,413	–	–
Liberal hold		Swing		+10.43

2012 Quebec general election
Party	Candidate	Votes	%	±%
Liberal	Christine St-Pierre	17,191	55.65	-11.51
Coalition Avenir Québec	Abel-Claude Aslanian	5,393	17.46	+13.11*
Parti Québécois	Rachid Bandou	5,319	17.22	-3.70
Québec solidaire	Marianne Breton Fontaine	2,474	8.01	+3.76
Option nationale	Sebastien Croteau	512	1.66	–
Total valid votes		30,889	98.67	–
Total rejected ballots		416	1.33	–
Turnout		31,305	64.76	+17.85
Electors		48,339	–	–

* Result compared to Action démocratique

2008 Quebec general election
Party	Candidate	Votes	%	±%
Liberal	Christine St-Pierre	15,145	67.16	+7.07
Parti Québécois	Marc-André Nolet	4,718	20.92	+4.29
Action démocratique	Ahamed Badawy	982	4.35	-10.12
Québec solidaire	André Parizeau	958	4.25	+0.45
Green	Nicolas Rémillard-Tessier	747	3.31	-1.71
Total valid votes		22,550	98.67	–
Total rejected ballots		304	1.33	–
Turnout		22,854	46.91	-15.12
Electors		48,719	–	–

2007 Quebec general election: Acadie
Party	Candidate	Votes	%	±%
Liberal	Christine St-Pierre	17,962	60.09	−10.30
Parti Québécois	Frédéric Lapointe	4,970	16.63	−3.70
Action démocratique	Charles Ghorayeb	4,327	14.47	+7.64
Green	Nicolas Rémillard-Tessier	1,500	5.02	–
Québec solidaire	André Parizeau	1,135	3.80	+3.31
Total valid votes		29,894	98.93	–
Total rejected ballots		322	1.07	–
Turnout		30,216	62.03	−3.63
Electors		48,712	–	–
Liberal hold		Swing		-3.30
Source: Official Results, Le Directeur général des élections du Québec.

== See also ==
- List of foreign ministers in 2017
- List of current foreign ministers

Political offices
Preceded by Line Beauchamp	Minister of Culture and Communications; 2007–2012	Succeeded by Maka Kotto
Preceded by Carole Theberge	Minister for the Status of Women; 2007–2012	Succeeded by Stéphanie Vallée
Preceded by Jean-François Lisée	Minister of International Relations and La Francophonie; 2014–2018	Succeeded by
