= Vrai changement pour Montréal =

Real Change for Montreal Vrai changement pour Montréal
- Municipal party
- Leader: Justine McIntyre
- Founded: September 4, 2013
- Dissolved: March 16, 2021
- Headquarters: 5070 Fraser Street; Montreal, Quebec; H8Z 2S5
- Ideology: Environmentalism; Community politics
- Political position: Centre
- Colours: Orange

Website
- http://vraichangementmtl.org/

Vrai changement pour Montréal (English: Real Change for Montreal) was a municipal political party in Montreal, Quebec, Canada. The party's leader was Justine McIntyre.

== Origins and 2013 campaign ==
Vrai changement was founded by Mélanie Joly in September 2013 to contest the 2013 Montreal municipal elections. Joly was the party's 2013 mayoral candidate.

Joly released a ten-point platform during the 2013 campaign, highlighted by a plan for improved public transit (via a 130-kilometre rapid service bus system), the construction of affordable housing units with enough rooms for young families, and a "Charter of Nightlife" to promote Montreal's vibrant nocturnal scene. She also promised to make more information publicly available, promote public art, and encourage citizen ventures via a Montreal wiki. On economic issues, Joly promised to simplify the application process for persons starting a business and to establish the office of a "Chief of economic development," who would be responsible for promotions and co-ordination.

Describing her party platform as "simple and very ambitious," Joly also remarked, "Basically, we don't want Montreal to become a huge suburb. We want to keep the cultural identity of Montreal while also bettering the quality of life for Montrealers."

== 2013 election results ==
Despite being a political newcomer, Joly built a strong support base throughout the mayoral campaign and received over 26% of the vote on election day, finishing a relatively close second against the winning candidate, Denis Coderre.

The party was less successful in the elections for Montreal City Council but it made some breakthroughs. The party received just over six per cent of the vote, and four of its candidates were elected to city council: Normand Marinacci (who was elected as borough mayor of L'Île-Bizard–Sainte-Geneviève), Justine McIntyre, Lorraine Pagé, and Steve Shanahan. In addition, the party won control of the L'Île-Bizard–Sainte-Geneviève borough by winning three of its four borough councilor seats. Another borough councilor, Roger Trottier, was elected in Pierrefonds-Roxboro. Joly's co-listed candidate was defeated, meaning that she was not able to take a seat on council herself.

After the election, Joly said that she would remain in municipal politics and run for a council seat as soon as possible. She remained the party's leader until September 2014, when she stepped down and was succeeded by Pagé. Joly later ran in the 2015 federal election as the Liberal candidate in Ahuntsic-Cartierville and was elected.

Pagé stepped down as leader in 2015, and was succeeded by McIntyre.

== 2017 campaign ==
Between the 2013 and 2017 campaigns, VCM lost half of its eight incumbents to other parties. Lorraine Pagé left VCM to sit as an independent in 2015, and later joined Équipe Denis Coderre pour Montréal. In the VCM-controlled borough of L'Île-Bizard–Sainte-Geneviève, borough mayor Normand Marinacci and borough councillors Christian Larocque and Jean-Dominic Lévesque-René joined Projet Montréal in 2017, handing control of the borough to that party.

In the 2017 election, the party did not run a candidate for mayor, concentrating instead on local races. Going into the race with four incumbents, it ran three candidates for borough mayor, seven candidates for city councillor, and 10 candidates for borough councillor, largely in the West Island boroughs.

On election night, all of its candidates were defeated; following this, the party announced that it would suspend its activities. The party fully ceased activities in 2021, after no viable candidates were submitted and met the conditions set by the Governing Council for leadership of the party.
