= Thérèse Lavoie-Roux =

Canadian politician

The Honourable Thérèse Lavoie-Roux

Senator for Acadie, Quebec
- In office September 27, 1990 – March 12, 2001
- Appointed by: Brian Mulroney

Member of the National Assembly of Quebec for L'Acadie
- In office November 15, 1976 – September 24, 1989
- Preceded by: François Cloutier
- Succeeded by: Yvan Bordeleau

Personal details
- Born: March 12, 1928 Rivière-du-Loup, Quebec
- Died: January 31, 2009 (aged 80) Montreal, Quebec
- Party: Quebec Liberal Party
- Other political affiliations: Progressive Conservative
- Cabinet: Minister of Health and Social Services (1985–1989)
- Committees: Chairman, Standing Committee on Internal Economy, Budgets and Administration (1991–1996)

Thérèse Lavoie-Roux (March 12, 1928 – January 31, 2009) was a Canadian politician and social worker who served in the National Assembly of Quebec and the Senate of Canada. She was the Minister of Health and Social Services from 1985 to 1989.

== Early life ==
Lavoie-Roux was born on March 12, 1928, in Rivière-du-Loup, Quebec, the daughter of Lauréat Lavoie and Charlotte Dubé. She received her undergraduate degree in 1949, and her master's degree in social work from the University of Montreal. She became a social worker and therapist at the Montreal Children's Hospital from 1951 to 1960. She served on a number of boards, including the Home Care Services for the Mentally Disturbed.

In 1969, the law changed and women were allowed to be members of the Montreal Roman Catholic School Board for the first time. Lavoie-Roux was selected by the Archbishop of Montreal to be the first female member and upon her selection, she was elected as Vice-Chair. In 1970, she became the Chair, a position she would hold for seven years. During this time, she initiated a meals programme.

== Political career ==
In 1976, the premier of Quebec, Robert Bourassa, invited her to run for a seat in the National Assembly of Quebec and promised her a cabinet position if the Liberal Party won a majority. Lavoie-Roux won her seat in the 1976 general election for the riding of L'Acadie but not the cabinet position, as the Liberal Party failed to win enough seats. She was the only female opposition member and only one of five women in total. She became the opposition critic on the Status of Women. She was re-elected in 1981 and 1985. From 1985 to 1989, she was the Minister of Health and Social Services in the cabinet of Robert Bourassa. She was also the Minister responsible for Family Policy.

In 1990, she was appointed by Prime Minister Brian Mulroney to the Senate of Canada representing the senatorial division of Acadie, Quebec. She sat as a Progressive Conservative. While in the Senate, she was chair of the Internal Economy Committee. She retired on her 73rd birthday in 2001.

== Personal life ==
She married Lucien Roux on July 12, 1962. She died in Montreal on January 31, 2009.
