= André Morin =

Canadian politician (born 1961)

André Morin MNA

Member of the National Assembly of Quebec for Acadie
- Incumbent
- Assumed office October 3, 2022
- Preceded by: Christine St-Pierre

Personal details
- Born: André Albert Morin; 1961 (age 64–65) Montreal, Quebec, Canada
- Party: Quebec Liberal Party

André Albert Morin (French pronunciation: [ɑ̃dʁe mɔʁɛ̃]; born 1961) is a Canadian politician, who was elected to the National Assembly of Quebec in the 2022 Quebec general election. He represents the riding of Acadie as a member of the Quebec Liberal Party.

As of September 7, 2024, he serves as the critic for Justice; Relations with First Nations and Inuit Peoples; Immigration, Francisation and Integration; International Relations and Francophonie; and Nord-du-Québec.

A native of the Bordeaux-Cartierville neighbourhood in Montreal, he is a former deputy director of the Public Prosecution Service of Canada.

== Electoral record ==
2022 Quebec general election: Acadie
Party	Candidate	Votes	%	±%
Liberal	André A. Morin	10,981	42.26	-11.54
Québec solidaire	Elyse Lévesque	4,468	17.20	+3.45
Coalition Avenir Québec	Rosmeri Otoya Celis	4,446	17.11	+0.60
Conservative	Stéphanie Gentile	2,955	11.37	+9.19
Parti Québécois	Véronique Lecours	2,565	9.87	+0.87
Green	Roula Al Nseir	569	2.19	-0.58
Total valid votes		25,984	98.36	
Total rejected ballots		434	1.64	
Turnout		26,418	53.45	
Electors on the lists		49,427		
