= Nicole Roy-Arcelin =

Canadian politician (born 1941)

Member of Parliament for Ahuntsic
- In office 1988–1993
- Preceded by: riding re-established
- Succeeded by: Michel Daviault

Personal details
- Born: 12 October 1941 (age 84) Chicoutimi, Quebec, Canada
- Party: Progressive Conservative
- Spouse: André Arcelin

Nicole Roy-Arcelin (born 12 October 1941) is a Canadian politician, a member of the House of Commons of Canada from 1988 to 1993 and a city councillor in Montreal.

== Background ==
Roy-Arcelin' was born on 12 October 1941 in Chicoutimi, Quebec. Prior to her election, she was pursuing a career in nursing. Her background also includes special events arrangement and performances as a singer. Her husband is André Arcelin, a doctor who emigrated from Haiti in 1964.

== Federal politics ==
Roy-Arcelin' became the Progressive Conservative Member of Parliament for the district of Ahuntsic electoral district in 1988. She served in the 34th Canadian Parliament. She was defeated by Bloc Québécois candidate Michel Daviault in the 1993 election.

After losing her seat, she made three unsuccessful attempts at a political comeback in federal politics, coming third each time:

- In a 1996 by-election in the district of Papineau—Saint-Michel; Liberal candidate Pierre Pettigrew won.
- In Ahuntsic in 1997; Liberal Eleni Bakopanos won.
- In LaSalle—Émard against Prime Minister Paul Martin in 2004; Martin won. Roy-Arcelin ran in this election as the candidate of the re-formed Conservative Party, which had been formed the previous year through the merger of her former party, the Progressive Conservatives, with the Canadian Alliance.

== City politics ==
Roy-Arcelin' ran as the Vision Montreal candidate for city councillor in the district of Jean-Rivard in 1998 against incumbent Daniel Boucher, winning with 39% of the vote. During her term in municipal office, she served on Pierre Bourque's executive committee. However she lost her bid for re-election to a candidate of Mayor Gérald Tremblay's party in 2001.

== Electoral record (partial) ==
1988 Canadian federal election: Ahuntsic
Party	Candidate	Votes	%	Expenditures
Progressive Conservative	Nicole Roy-Arcelin	21,748	42.45	$43,166
Liberal	Raymond Garneau	21,056	41.09	$45,688
New Democratic	Vincent Guadagnano	5,638	11.00	$5,347
Green	Michel Limoges	1,131	2.21	$655
Rhinoceros	Daniel Roumain I Muresan	1,042	2.03	$0
Marxist–Leninist	Christine Dandenault	343	0.67	$130
Communist	Suzanne Dagenais	203	0.40	$18
Commonwealth of Canada	Denis Tremblay	77	0.15	$0
Total valid votes		51,238	100.00	
Total rejected ballots		845		
Turnout		52,083	77.85	
Electors on the lists		66,906		
Source: Report of the Chief Electoral Officer, Thirty-fourth General Election, 1988.
