= Parti Québécois candidates in the 2007 Quebec provincial election =

The Parti Québécois fielded a full slate of 125 candidates in the 2007 Quebec provincial election, and won thirty-six seats to emerge as the third-largest party in the National Assembly. Many of these candidates are the subjects of individual Wikipedia pages; information about others may be found here.

== Candidates ==
=== Acadie: Frédéric Lapointe ===
Frédéric Lapointe is a former vice-president of the Fédération étudiante universitaire du Québec. He was thirty-three years old in 2007 and was an evaluation advisor at the Université de Montréal. He later sought election to the Montreal city council as a candidate of Vision Montreal. In 2011, he founded a municipal anti-corruption group called the Civic Action League; its name was taken from Montreal's original Civic Action League, founded by Jean Drapeau in the 1950s.

Electoral record
Election	Division	Party	Votes	%	Place	Winner
2007 provincial	Acadie	Parti Québécois	4,970	16.63	2/5	Christine St-Pierre, Liberal
2009 Montreal municipal	Council, Ahuntsic division	Vision Montreal	3,347	32.83	3/3	Émilie Thuillier, Projet Montréal

=== Chapleau: Edith Gendron ===
Edith Gendron has a Master of Arts degree in political science from the University of Ottawa. She is a Canadian civil servant and is best known for her involvement in a labour controversy regarding her political views. She worked for Canadian Heritage from 2000 to 2004 and was a senior policy officer in charge of promoting official bilingualism in the Atlantic provinces. In 2004, she joined and was elected president of a new Quebec sovereigntist group named Le Quebec, un pays!. As a result, she was disciplined and eventually dismissed from her position. Department representatives said they did not object to her membership in the group, but considered her position as its president incompatible with employment in a department whose mandate is to foster Canadian unity. Gendron argued that there was no conflict of interest, saying that she would not make public comments about Heritage Canada in her private responsibilities. The Public Service Alliance of Canada and politicians such as Ed Broadbent and Scott Reid supported Gendron's case, describing it was a civil rights issue. Stephen Harper, who was then leader of the Official Opposition, also supported Gendron, saying that he did not believe it was appropriate to "hire and fire someone based on their political views." In 2006, the Public Service Labour Relations Board ruled that Gendron had been in an "apparent conflict of interest," but that her supervisors had not made a reasonable effort to resolve the situation. It ordered the federal government to re-hire her with retroactive pay and to put her on paid leave until she could find a job in a different department or with different responsibilities. She was subsequently re-hired by Canadian Heritage, working at the Canadian Conservation Institute.

Gendron is married to Richard Nadeau, who has been the Bloc Québécois member of the House of Commons of Canada for Gatineau since 2006. She received 7,137 votes (22.04%) in 2007, finishing third against Liberal incumbent Benoît Pelletier.
