= Michel Daviault =

Canadian politician

Michel Daviault (born 25 November 1952 in Montreal, Quebec) was a member of the House of Commons of Canada from 1993 to 1997. His career has been in real estate and administration.

He was elected in the Ahuntsic electoral district under the Bloc Québécois party in the 1993 federal election, thus serving in the 35th Canadian Parliament. He did not seek a second term in office and therefore left Canadian politics following the 1997 federal election.

Parliament of Canada
| Preceded by Nicole Roy-Arcelin | Member of Parliament for Ahuntsic; 1993–1997 | Succeeded by Eleni Bakopanos |
