= Mélanie Joly =

Canadian politician and lawyer (born 1979)

The Honourable Mélanie Joly PC MP
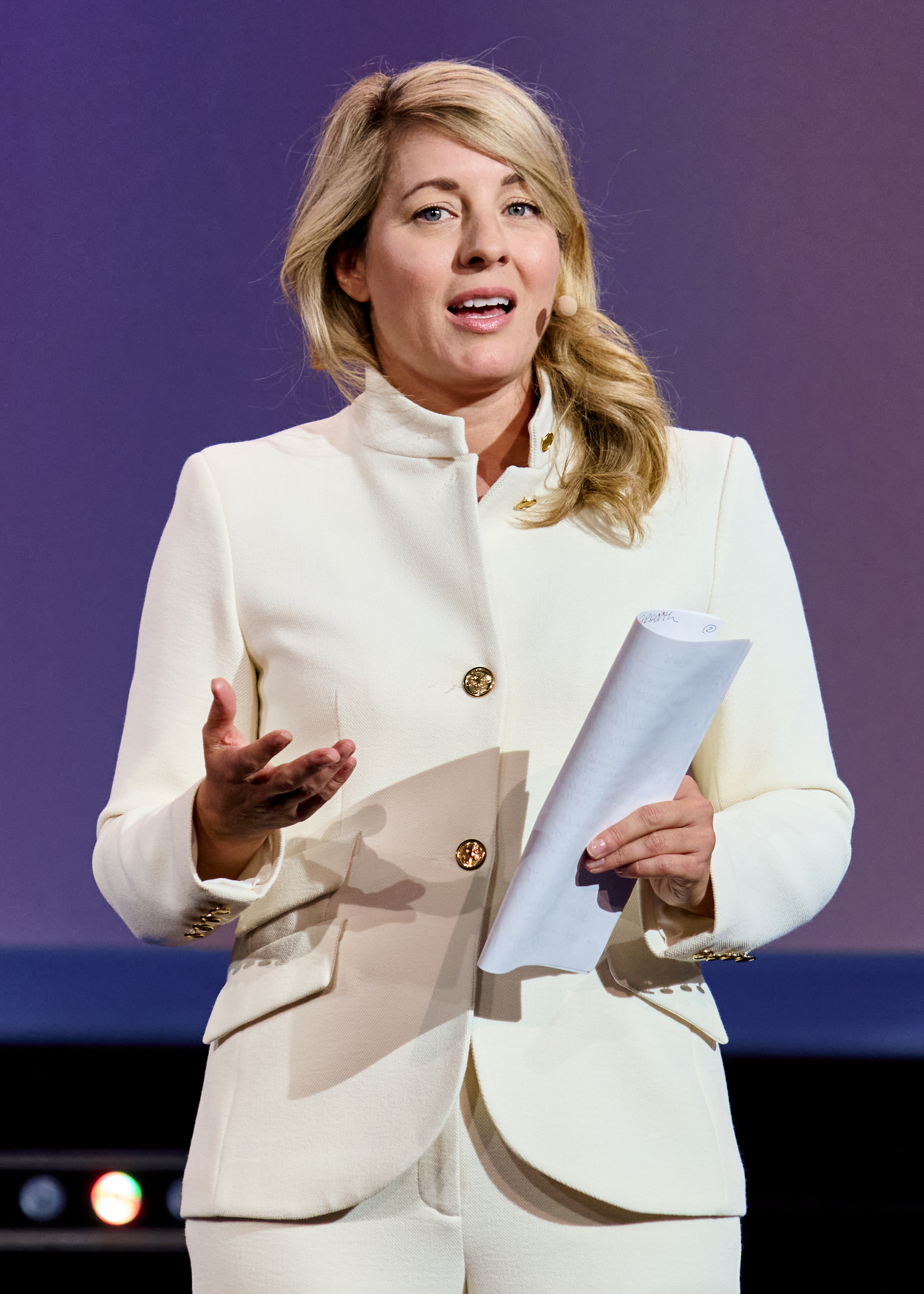
- Joly in 2025

Minister of Industry Registrar General of Canada
- Incumbent
- Assumed office May 13, 2025
- Prime Minister: Mark Carney
- Preceded by: Anita Anand

Minister responsible for Canada Economic Development for Quebec Regions
- Incumbent
- Assumed office May 13, 2025
- Prime Minister: Mark Carney
- Preceded by: Pascale St-Onge

Minister of Foreign Affairs (Note: Stylized as Minister of Foreign Affairs and International Development since 2025)
- In office October 26, 2021 – May 13, 2025
- Prime Minister: Justin Trudeau; Mark Carney
- Preceded by: Marc Garneau
- Succeeded by: Anita Anand

Minister of International Development
- In office March 14, 2025 – May 13, 2025
- Prime Minister: Mark Carney
- Preceded by: Ahmed Hussen
- Succeeded by: Randeep Sarai

Minister of Economic Development and Official Languages
- In office November 20, 2019 – October 26, 2021
- Prime Minister: Justin Trudeau
- Preceded by: Navdeep Bains (Economic Development); Herself (Official Languages)
- Succeeded by: Mary Ng (Economic Development); Ginette Petitpas Taylor (Official Languages)

Minister responsible for the Federal Economic Development Initiative for Northern Ontario
- In office November 20, 2019 – October 26, 2021
- Prime Minister: Justin Trudeau
- Preceded by: Navdeep Bains
- Succeeded by: Patty Hajdu

Minister of Tourism, Official Languages and La Francophonie
- In office July 18, 2018 – November 20, 2019
- Prime Minister: Justin Trudeau
- Preceded by: Bardish Chagger (Tourism); Marie-Claude Bibeau (La Francophonie)
- Succeeded by: Herself (as Minister for Official Languages)

Minister of Canadian Heritage
- In office November 4, 2015 – July 18, 2018
- Prime Minister: Justin Trudeau
- Preceded by: Shelly Glover
- Succeeded by: Pablo Rodríguez

Member of Parliament for Ahuntsic-Cartierville
- Incumbent
- Assumed office October 19, 2015
- Preceded by: Maria Mourani (Ahuntsic)

Leader of Vrai changement pour Montréal
- In office September 4, 2013 – September 5, 2014
- Preceded by: Party established
- Succeeded by: Lorraine Pagé

Personal details
- Born: January 16, 1979 (age 47) Montreal, Quebec, Canada
- Party: Liberal
- Other political affiliations: Vrai changement pour Montréal (municipal)
- Spouse: Félix Marzell
- Relatives: Carole-Marie Allard (stepmother), Jean-Sébastien Joly (brother)
- Education: Université de Montréal (LLB); Brasenose College, Oxford (MJur)
- Occupation: Politician; lawyer
- Awards: Chevening Scholarship

Mélanie Joly (French pronunciation: [melani ʒɔli]; born January 16, 1979) is a Canadian politician and lawyer who has been Minister of Industry and Minister responsible for Canada Economic Development for Quebec Regions since May 2025. A member of the Liberal Party, Joly has been the member of Parliament (MP) for Ahuntsic-Cartierville since 2015. She has held a number of portfolios including Canadian heritage, tourism, foreign affairs, and La Francophonie.

Born in Montreal, Quebec, Joly graduated from Université de Montréal and Brasenose College, Oxford. Joly ran for mayor of Montreal in the 2013 Montreal municipal election, placing second behind eventual winner Denis Coderre.

== Early and personal life ==
Born on January 16, 1979 at Fleury Hospital, Joly grew up in Montreal's northern neighbourhood of Ahuntsic. She is the daughter of Laurette Racine and Clément Joly, an accountant who was president of the Liberal Party's finance committee in Quebec and board member of the Canadian Air Transport Security Authority from 2002 to 2007. Her late stepmother, Carole-Marie Allard, was a lawyer and journalist, who served as an MP representing Laval—East from 2000 to 2004.

Joly is married to Felix Marzell, an artist and entrepreneur.

== Education and career ==
After completing her Bachelor of Laws degree at the Université de Montréal in 2001, Joly became a member of the Bar of Quebec. She subsequently received the Chevening Scholarship and continued her studies at Brasenose College, Oxford, where she received a Magister Juris in comparative and public law in 2003. Joly also interned at Radio-Canada, in 2007.

At the beginning of her career, Joly practiced law at two major Montreal law firms, Stikeman Elliott and Davies Ward Phillips & Vineberg. At the latter firm, her mentor was former Parti Quebecois premier Lucien Bouchard, who supplied her with a letter of recommendation for her Oxford application. She worked primarily in the areas of civil and commercial litigation, bankruptcy and insolvency law. She was also a defence lawyer for Groupe Polygone, before the Gomery Commission of inquiry.

In 2010, she became the first Quebecer to receive the Arnold Edinborough award, which recognizes philanthropic involvement within the Canadian cultural community.

In 2013, she was appointed to head the Quebec Advisory Committee for Justin Trudeau's campaign for the leadership of the Liberal Party of Canada.

Along with her colleagues, she founded Generation of Ideas, which is a political forum for 25- to 35-year-olds. She is also a member of the collective group Sortie 13, for which she wrote "Les villes au pouvoir ou comment relancer le monde municipal québécois".

== Political career ==
=== Municipal campaign ===
In June 2013, Joly announced her candidacy for mayor of Montreal in the elections which occurred in the same year. She founded a new party, Vrai changement pour Montréal, to support her candidacy with her personal friends. On November 3, election day, she obtained 26.50 per cent of the votes, finishing six points behind the winner, Denis Coderre. However, she finished ahead of several more established challengers.

=== Federal politics ===
In 2015, Joly left municipal politics and announced her candidacy for the nomination of the Liberal Party of Canada in the new electoral district of Ahuntsic-Cartierville for the 2015 Canadian federal election to the 42nd Canadian Parliament. Joly won the riding with 47.5 per cent of the vote, unseating incumbent Maria Mourani.

==== Minister of Canadian Heritage (2015–2018) ====
After the 2015 general election, Joly was named as the minister of Canadian heritage as part of Prime Minister Justin Trudeau's new government.

==== Minister of Tourism, Official Languages and La Francophonie (2018–2019) ====
On August 28, 2018, Joly was named to the tourism, official languages, and La Francophonie portfolio.

==== Minister of Economic Development (2019–2021) ====
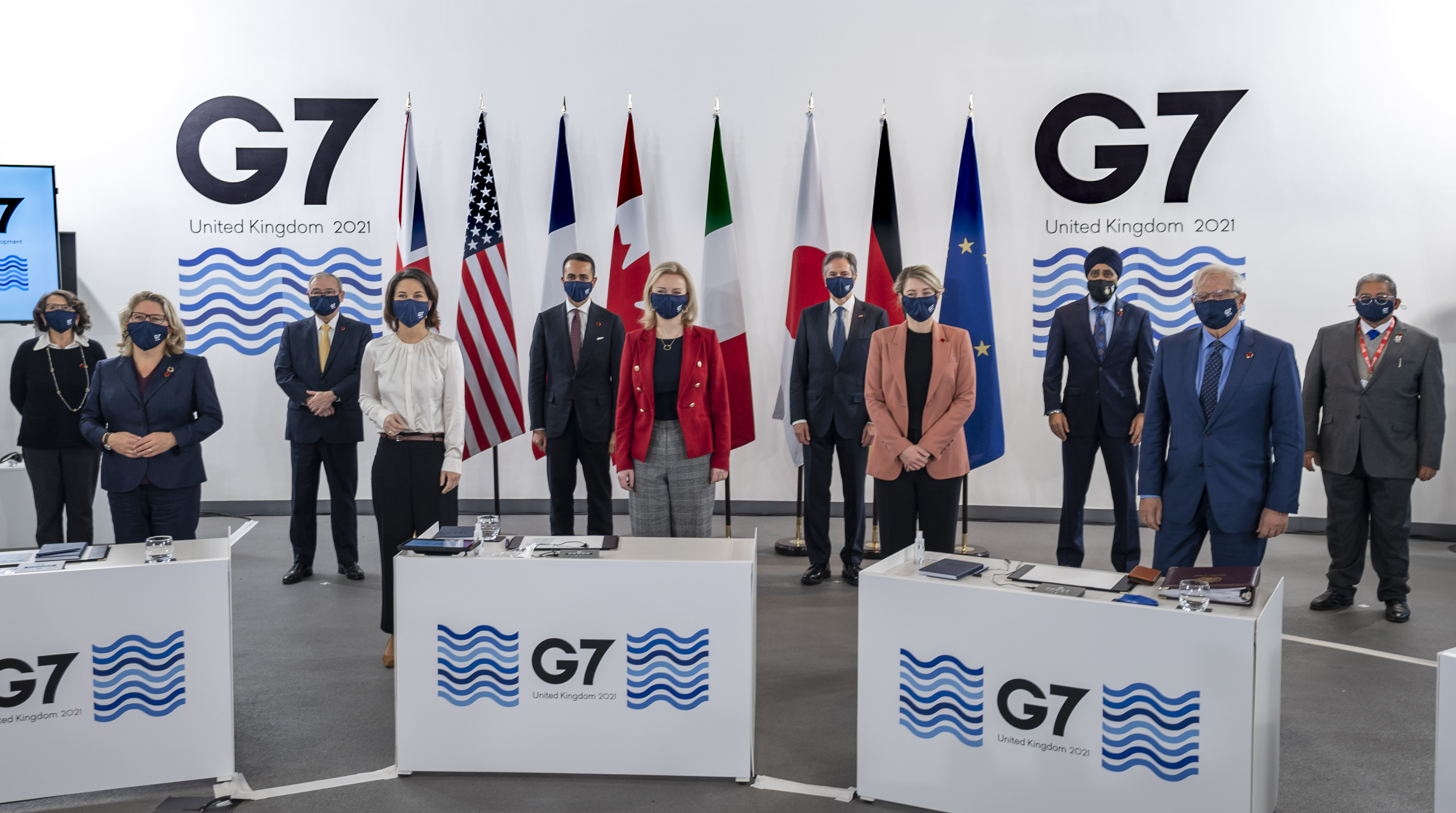
Joly, then the Minister of Foreign Affairs, stands in the front row alongside other foreign and development ministers during the 47th G7 summit, December 2021

She assumed the position of Minister of Economic Development and Official Languages on December 13, 2019. Her mandate was marked by the introduction of separate regional development agencies for Western Canada: Canada Economic Development for the Prairies (PrairieCan) and Canada Economic Development for the Pacific (PacifiCan).

On June 15, 2021, she introduced Bill C-32 in the House of Commons, an Act to achieve substantive equality of English and French and to strengthen the Official Languages Act. The first reform since 1988, Joly's modernization was intended to ensure that the government's broad range of measures in support of official languages responded to and adapted to the challenges faced by these languages in the various regions of the country.

==== Minister of Foreign Affairs (2021–2025) ====
Joly took office as Canada's Minister of Foreign Affairs on October 26, 2021.

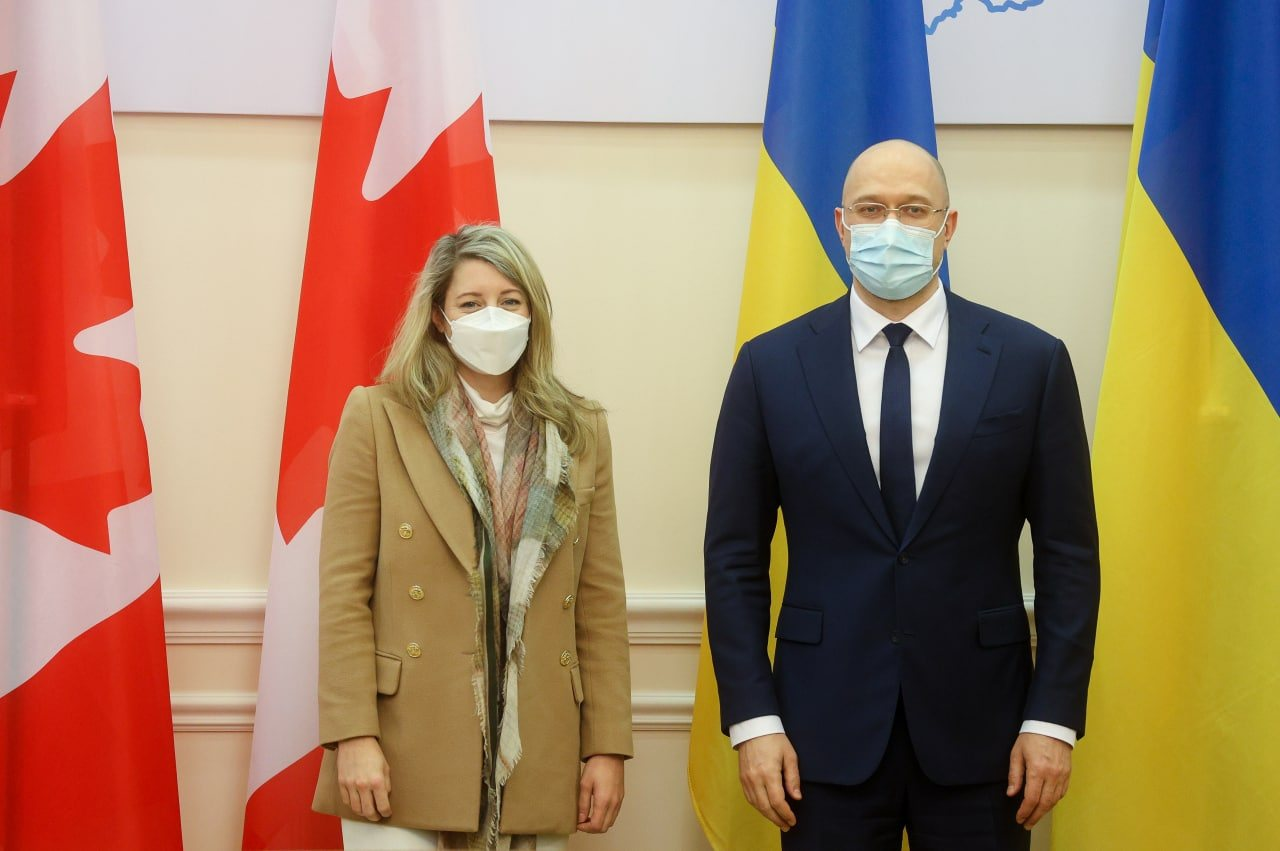
Joly alongside Ukrainian Prime Minister Denys Shmyhal, January 2022

Amidst global concerns about a buildup of Russian troops on the country's eastern border, she visited Ukraine in January 2022. Amidst the Russian invasion of Ukraine, she visited again on May 8, 2022, when she accompanied Prime Minister Trudeau on an unannounced visit to Kyiv to reopen the Canadian embassy. However, it was reported that the Canadian Embassy was never in fact reopened and the Canadian ambassador did not return. One year after the invasion began, she touted her government's efforts to promote regime change in Russia.

In May 2022, Turkish President Recep Tayyip Erdoğan voiced his opposition to Sweden and Finland joining NATO, accusing the two countries of tolerating groups which Turkey classifies as terrorist organizations, including the Kurdish militant groups PKK and YPG and the supporters of Fethullah Gülen, a US-based Muslim cleric accused by Turkey of orchestrating a failed 2016 Turkish coup d'état attempt. Joly held talks with Turkey to convince the Turkish government of the need for the integration of the two Nordic nations into NATO.

During the March 2023 House of Commons committee studying Chinese election interference in the 2019 and 2021 federal elections, Joly accused China of "trying to sow division in many democracies" and suggested ways foreign meddling could be hindered in the future.

Following a vote on the persecution of Uyghurs in Xinjiang, it was reported in May 2023 that Conservative MP Michael Chong's family in Hong Kong was targeted, including by a Chinese diplomat named Zhao Wei. Wei was later declared persona non grata by Joly.

The murder of Canadian Sikh separatist leader Hardeep Singh Nijjar caused a diplomatic crisis, with Canada–India relations falling to their lowest point. Joly ordered the expulsion of Pavan Kumar Rai, a top Indian diplomat in Canada who headed the operations of the Research and Analysis Wing, India's external intelligence agency, in Canada.

In September 2023, Azerbaijan launched a large-scale military offensive against the self-declared breakaway state of Republic of Artsakh, a move seen by the European Parliament as a violation of the 2020 ceasefire agreement. Joly expressed grave concern with Azerbaijan's military intervention, calling for immediate cessation of hostilities, asking the Azerbaijani government to refrain from any actions and activities that pose a risk to the safety and welfare of the civilian population of Nagorno-Karabakh, labelling the military action as "unjustifiable" and the Lachin corridor blockade as "illegal".

After the events of the October 7 attacks, Joly rejected calls for a ceasefire in the Gaza war on October 30 but expressed support for a "humanitarian pause".

Joly was considered a possible candidate in the 2025 Liberal Party of Canada leadership election, upon the resignation of Prime Minister Justin Trudeau. On January 10, 2025, she announced that she would not enter the race to focus on the threat of tariffs on Canadian goods from the incoming second Trump administration, as Minister of Foreign Affairs. On January 19, she endorsed former Bank of Canada governor Mark Carney.

==== Minister of Industry (2025–present) ====
Following the 2025 Canadian federal election, the newly elected Liberal leader Mark Carney named Anita Anand as foreign minister and assigned Joly as Minister of Industry. Joly took charge of the file amid the 2025–2026 Canada–United States trade war. She has announced support for key impacted industries and has sought to protect workers amid tensions with Stelco's Hamilton plant and Stellantis' Brampton plant.

== Electoral record ==
2025 Canadian federal election: Ahuntsic-Cartierville
Party	Candidate	Votes	%	±%	Expenditures
Liberal	Mélanie Joly	30,833	60.96	+9.05	$87,587.41
Bloc Québécois	Nabila Ben Youssef	8,538	16.88	–5.74	$8,241.44
Conservative	Margie Ramos	7,600	15.03	+6.87	$7,292.29
New Democratic	Idil Issa	3,333	6.59	–5.13	$1,840.85
Marxist–Leninist	Linda Sullivan	273	0.54	N/A	$0.00
Total valid votes/expense limit		50,577	98.31	+0.35	$126,245.59
Total rejected ballots		871	1.69	–0.35	
Turnout		51,448	67.35		
Eligible voters		76,387			
Liberal notional hold		Swing		+7.40	
Source: Elections Canada
Note: number of eligible voters does not include voting day registrations.

2021 Canadian federal election: Ahuntsic-Cartierville
Party	Candidate	Votes	%	±%	Expenditures
Liberal	Mélanie Joly	26,402	52.38	–0.07	$71,604.96
Bloc Québécois	Anna Simonyan	11,112	22.04	+0.31	$12,053.64
New Democratic	Ghada Chaabi	5,844	11.59	+0.19	$3,163.17
Conservative	Steven Duarte	4,247	8.43	+1.15	$0.00
Green	Luc Joli-Coeur	1,491	2.96	–3.12	$0.00
People's	Manon Chevalier	1,313	2.60	+1.54	$1,694.83
Total valid votes		50,409	100.00	–	$110,827.67
Total rejected ballots		1,054	2.05	+0.23	
Turnout		51,463	64.16	–3.34	
Eligible voters		80,206			
Liberal hold		Swing		–0.19	
Source: Elections Canada

2019 Canadian federal election: Ahuntsic-Cartierville
Party	Candidate	Votes	%	±%	Expenditures
Liberal	Mélanie Joly	28,904	52.45	+5.65	$75,399.95
Bloc Québécois	André Parizeau	11,974	21.73	+8.53	none listed
New Democratic	Zahia El-Masri	6,284	11.4	−18.6	none listed
Conservative	Kathy Laframboise	4,013	7.28	−0.02	$0.00
Green	Jean-Michel Lavarenne	3,352	6.08	+3.98	$7,837.28
People's	Raymond Ayas	584	1.06		$7,512.42
Total valid votes/expense limit		55,111	100.0		
Total rejected ballots		1,022			
Turnout		56,133	67.5		
Eligible voters		83,176			
Liberal hold		Swing		−1.44	
Source: Elections Canada

2015 Canadian federal election
Party	Candidate	Votes	%	±%	Expenditures
Liberal	Mélanie Joly	26,026	46.8	+15.7	$149,387.67
New Democratic	Maria Mourani	16,684	30.0	+0.1	$86,722.49
Bloc Québécois	Nicolas Bourdon	7,346	13.2	−15.1	$27,931.96
Conservative	Wiliam Moughrabi	4,051	7.3	−1.3	$12,346.58
Green	Gilles Mercier	1,175	2.1	+0.7	–
Rhinoceros	Catherine Gascon-David	285	0.5	–	–
Total valid votes/Expense limit		–	100.0		$220,041.13
Total rejected ballots		–	–	–	
Turnout		–	–	–	
Eligible voters		82,863			
Source: Elections Canada

== Notes ==
29th Canadian Ministry (2015–2025) – Cabinet of Justin Trudeau
Cabinet posts (3)
Predecessor	Office	Successor
Marc Garneau	Minister of Foreign Affairs; October 26, 2021 – May 13, 2025	Anita Anand
Bardish Chagger (Tourism); Marie-Claude Bibeau (La Francophonie)	Minister of Tourism, Official Languages and la Francophonie; July 17, 2018 – November 20, 2019	Herself
Shelly Glover	Minister of Canadian Heritage; November 4, 2015 – July 17, 2018	Pablo Rodriguez
Order of precedence
Preceded by Dominic LeBlanc as Member of the Cabinet	Order of Precedence of Canada as Member of the Cabinet	Succeeded by François-Philippe Champagne as Member of the Cabinet
