= Lorraine Pagé =

Canadian politician and trade unionist

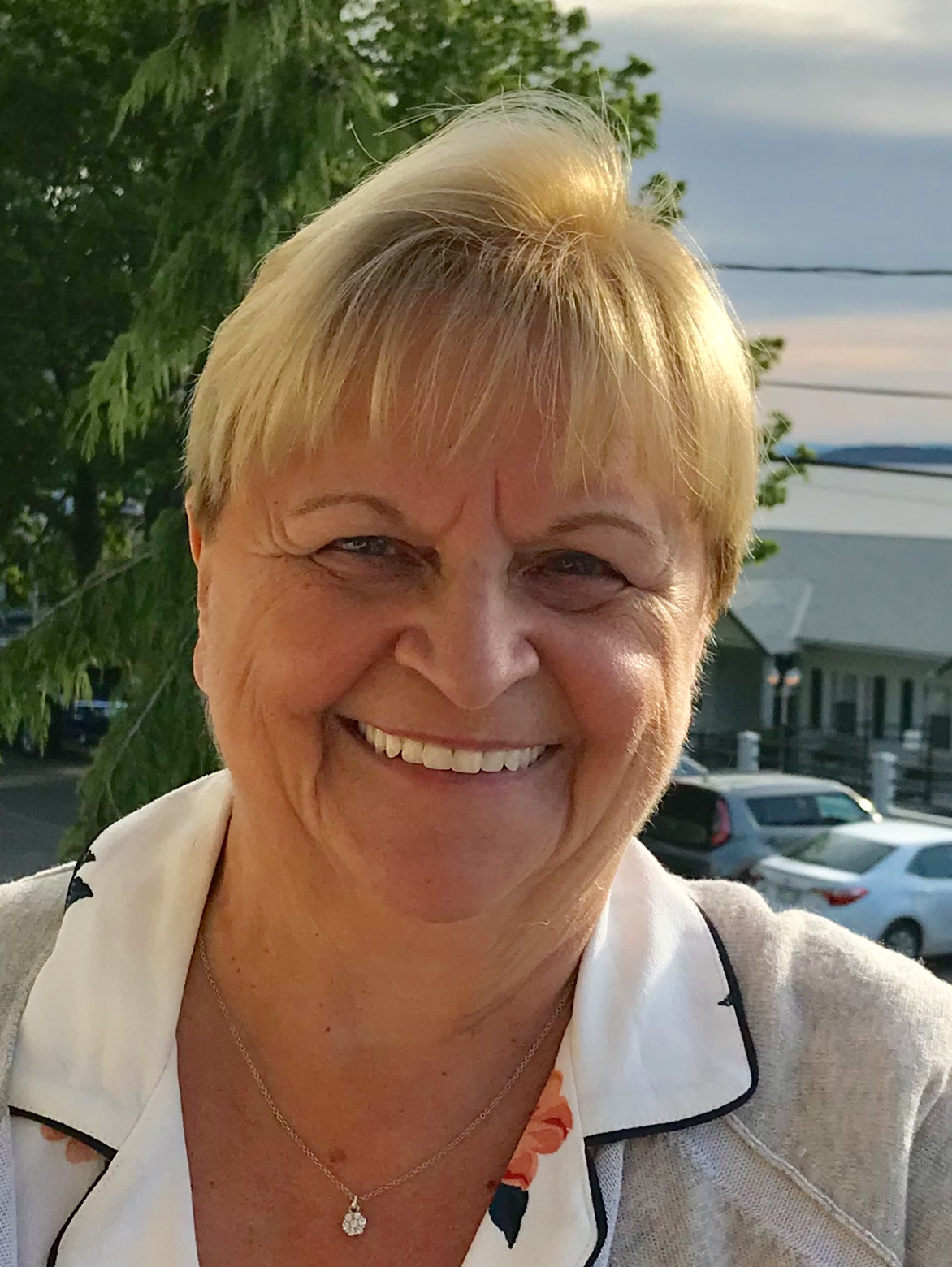

Montreal City Councillor for Sault-au-Récollet
- In office 2013–2017
- Preceded by: Étienne Brunet
- Succeeded by: Jérôme Normand

Personal details
- Born: 1947 (age 78–79)
- Party: Vrai changement pour Montréal

Lorraine Pagé (born 1947) is a Canadian politician and trade unionist. She previously served on Montreal City Council as councillor for the district of Sault-au-Récollet in the borough of Ahuntsic-Cartierville from 2013 to 2017.

== Biography ==
Earlier, she also served as head of the Centrale des syndicats du Québec from 1988 to 1999, and was the first woman to lead a major labour union in the province.

She ran in the 2013 municipal election as a candidate of the Vrai changement pour Montréal party. On election day, she won the seat by a margin of just one vote over Nathalie Hotte of the Équipe Denis Coderre. After party leader Mélanie Joly was not elected to city council, Joly stepped down as leader in 2014, and Pagé was then selected as Joly's successor.

Pagé later became an independent member, and was succeeded as party leader by Justine McIntyre. Pagé, who ran against Team Coderre in the election of 2013, decided to join Équipe Denis Coderre for the one in 2017. She stated that the party was created as a vehicle for Melanie Joly, who has since left for federal politics, serving as the heritage minister.
