= Ahuntsic (federal electoral district) =

Former federal electoral district in Quebec, Canada

Coordinates: 45.55°N 73.67°W

Quebec electoral district
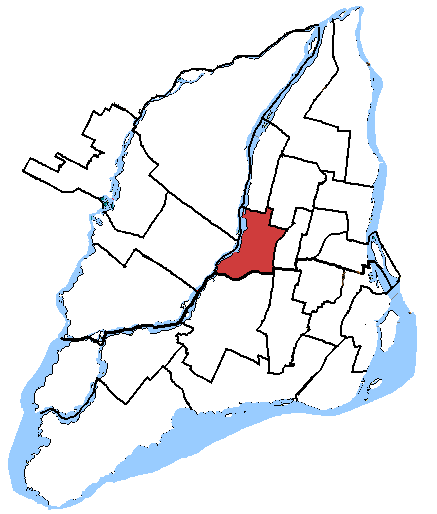
- Ahuntsic in relation to other Quebec federal electoral districts (2003 boundaries)

Defunct federal electoral district
- Legislature: House of Commons
- District created: 1987
- District abolished: 2013
- First contested: 1988
- Last contested: 2011
- District webpage: profile, map

Demographics
- Population (2011): 100,840
- Electors (2011): 73,391
- Area (km²): 18.16
- Census division(s): Montreal
- Census subdivision(s): Montreal

Ahuntsic (pronounced [aɔntsɪk]) was a federal electoral district in Quebec, Canada, which was represented in the House of Commons from 1968 to 1979 and again from 1988 to 2015.

== Geography ==
The district included the neighbourhoods of Ahuntsic and Bordeaux-Cartierville and the western part of the neighbourhood of Sault-au-Recollet in the Borough of Ahuntsic-Cartierville.

Prior to being abolished, its neighbouring ridings were Papineau, Mount Royal, Saint-Laurent—Cartierville, Laval, Alfred-Pellan, Bourassa, and Saint-Léonard—Saint-Michel.

== History ==
The electoral district of Ahuntsic was created in 1966 from Saint-Denis and Laval ridings. In 1976, it was abolished when it was redistributed into Saint-Michel riding.

In 1987, the new district of Ahuntsic was created from Saint-Michel—Ahuntsic and Saint-Denis.

From 1993 to 2008 Ahuntsic was usually a competitive seat between Bloc Québécois and the Liberals. However, in 2011 Bloc Québécois incumbent Maria Mourani narrowly won reelection against a New Democratic surge that swept through Montreal and Quebec in general. Ahuntsic was the sole seat retained by Bloc Québécois in the Montreal area and one of only four won by the party overall at the 2011 federal election.

=== Members of Parliament ===
This riding has elected the following members of Parliament:

Parliament	Years	Member	Party
Ahuntsic; Riding created from Saint-Denis, Dollard and Laval
28th	1968–1972	Jean-Léo Rochon	Liberal
29th	1972–1974	Jeanne Sauvé	Liberal
30th	1974–1979	Jeanne Sauvé	Liberal
Riding dissolved into Saint-Michel, Laval-des-Rapides and Saint-Denis
Riding re-created from Saint-Michel—Ahuntsic, Laval-des-Rapides and Saint-Denis
34th	1988–1993	Nicole Roy-Arcelin	Progressive Conservative
35th	1993–1997	Michel Daviault	Bloc Québécois
36th	1997–2000	Eleni Bakopanos	Liberal
37th	2000–2004	Eleni Bakopanos	Liberal
38th	2004–2006	Eleni Bakopanos	Liberal
39th	2006–2008	Maria Mourani	Bloc Québécois
40th	2008–2011	Maria Mourani	Bloc Québécois
41st	2011–2013	Maria Mourani	Bloc Québécois
41st	2013–2015	Maria Mourani	Independent
Riding dissolved into Ahuntsic-Cartierville, Bourassa and Saint-Léonard—Saint-Michel

== Election results ==
=== Ahuntsic, 1988–2015 ===
2011 Canadian federal election
Party	Candidate	Votes	%	±%	Expenditures
Bloc Québécois	Maria Mourani	14,908	31.80	-7.68	$80,555.15
New Democratic	Chantal Reeves	14,200	30.29	+21.32	$2,487.91
Liberal	Noushig Eloyan	13,087	27.91	-10.68	$59,053.68
Conservative	Constantin Kiryakidis	3,770	8.04	-2.32	$6,585.00
Green	Ted Kouretas	620	1.32	-1.25	$237.10
Rhinoceros	Jean-Olivier Berthiaume	299	0.64	–	
Total valid votes/expense limit		46,884	100.00		
Total rejected ballots		516	1.09	-	
Turnout		47,400	64.98	-0.66	
Bloc Québécois hold		Swing		-14.50	

2008 Canadian federal election
Party	Candidate	Votes	%	±%	Expenditures
Bloc Québécois	Maria Mourani	18,815	39.48	+0.57	$53,286
Liberal	Eleni Bakopanos	18,392	38.59	+1.30	$51,887
Conservative	Jean Précourt	4,937	10.36	-1.89	$56,496
New Democratic	Alexandra Bélec	4,276	8.97%	+1.07	$6,663
Green	Lynette Tremblay	1,228	2.57%	-1.10	$20
Total valid votes/expense limit		47,648	100.00	–	$82,379
Total rejected ballots		523	1.09		
Turnout		48,181	65.64		
Bloc Québécois hold		Swing		-0.40	

2006 Canadian federal election
Party	Candidate	Votes	%	±%	Expenditures
Bloc Québécois	Maria Mourani	19,428	38.91	-2.34	$69,180
Liberal	Eleni Bakopanos	18,594	37.24	-6.51	$64,168
Conservative	Etienne Morin	6,089	12.25	+7.01	$16,100
New Democratic	Caroline Desrosiers	3,948	7.90	+1.70	$4,702
Green	Lynette Tremblay	1,836	3.67	+0.99	$411
Total valid votes/expense limit		49,895	100.00	$77,453	
Bloc Québécois gain from Liberal		Swing		-2.1	

2004 Canadian federal election
Party	Candidate	Votes	%	±%	Expenditures
Liberal	Eleni Bakopanos	21,234	43.75	-10.13	$59,946
Bloc Québécois	Maria Mourani	20,020	41.25	+9.02	$53,286
New Democratic	Annick Bergeron	3,013	6.20	+4.33	$3,308
Conservative	Jean E. Fortier	2,544	5.24	-3.85	$39,703
Green	Lynette Tremblay	1,301	2.68	+0.57	$2,388
Marijuana	F.X. de Longchamp	314	0.64	–	
Marxist–Leninist	Marsha Fine	102	0.21	-0.09	
Total valid votes/expense limit		48,528	100.00	$77,288	
Liberal hold		Swing	-9.6		

Note: Conservative vote is compared to the total of the Canadian Alliance vote and Progressive Conservative vote in 2000 election.

2000 Canadian federal election
Party	Candidate	Votes	%	±%
Liberal	Eleni Bakopanos	28,643	53.89	+4.64
Bloc Québécois	Fatima El Amraoui	17,132	32.23	+0.46
Progressive Conservative	Jessica Chartrand	3,018	5.68	-10.51
Alliance	Eugenia Romain	1,816	3.42	
Green	Mimi Ghosh	1,123	2.11	
New Democratic	Steve Moran	997	1.88	+0.09
Communist	Antonio Artuso	262	0.49	
Marxist–Leninist	Vincent Dorais	159	0.30	
Total valid votes		53,150	100.00	

1997 Canadian federal election
Party	Candidate	Votes	%	±%
Liberal	Eleni Bakopanos	28,971	49.25	+7.60
Bloc Québécois	Pauline Charest	18,689	31.77	-12.55
Progressive Conservative	Nicole Roy-Arcelin	9,520	16.18	+7.56
New Democratic	Stephen Moran	1,051	1.79	+0.44
Natural Law	Carmel Bernard	589	1.00	-0.50
Total valid votes		58,820	100.00	

1993 Canadian federal election
Party	Candidate	Votes	%	±%
Bloc Québécois	Michel Daviault	22,275	44.33	
Liberal	Céline Hervieux-Payette	20,934	41.66	+0.56
Progressive Conservative	Nicole Roy-Arcelin	4,332	8.62	-33.82
Natural Law	Marc Lacroix	752	1.50	
New Democratic	René Samson	675	1.34	-9.66
Independent	Haytoug Chamlian	567	1.13	
Abolitionist	Rolando Fusco	385	0.77	
Commonwealth of Canada	Christiane Deland-Gervais	332	0.66	+0.51
Total valid votes		50,252	100.00	

1988 Canadian federal election
Party	Candidate	Votes	%	±%
Progressive Conservative	Nicole Roy-Arcelin	21,748	42.45	+27.56
Liberal	Raymond Garneau	21,056	41.09	-26.39
New Democratic	Vincent Guadagnano	5,638	11.00	+1.33
Green	Michel Mike Lime Limoges	1,131	2.21	
Rhinoceros	Daniel Roumain I Muresan	1,042	2.03	
Independent	Christine Dandenault	343	0.67	
Communist	S. Dagenais	203	0.40	-0.06
Commonwealth of Canada	Denis Tremblay	77	0.15	
Total valid votes		51,238	100.00	

=== Ahuntsic, 1968–1979 ===
1974 Canadian federal election
Party	Candidate	Votes	%	±%
Liberal	Jeanne Sauvé	24,041	67.48	+13.23
Progressive Conservative	Marcel Grenier	5,304	14.89	-1.15
New Democratic	Emile Boudreau	3,448	9.68	-7.05
Social Credit	Aldéï Lanthier	2,449	6.87	-4.27
Marxist–Leninist	Francine Lavigne	223	0.63	
Communist	Beatrice F. Hough	161	0.45	
Total valid votes		35,626	100.00	

1972 Canadian federal election
Party	Candidate	Votes	%	±%
Liberal	Jeanne Sauvé	21,741	54.25	-10.67
New Democratic	Pierre de Bellefeuille	6,706	16.73	+2.78
Progressive Conservative	Normand Duval	6,429	16.04	+2.56
Social Credit	Aldéï Lanthier	4,467	11.15	+7.66
Independent	Monique L'Hostie	734	1.83	
Total valid votes		40,077	100.00	

Note: Social Credit vote is compared to Ralliement créditiste vote in the 1968 election.

1968 Canadian federal election
Party	Candidate	Votes	%
Liberal	Jean-L. Rochon	23,149	64.92
New Democratic	Louis-Philippe Lecours	4,977	13.96
Progressive Conservative	Claude Barriere	4,807	13.48
Independent Liberal	Claude Patenaude	1,483	4.16
Ralliement créditiste	Albert Paiement	1,243	3.49
Total valid votes		35,659	100.00

== See also ==
- List of Canadian electoral districts
- Historical federal electoral districts of Canada
