= Maria Mourani =

Canadian politician

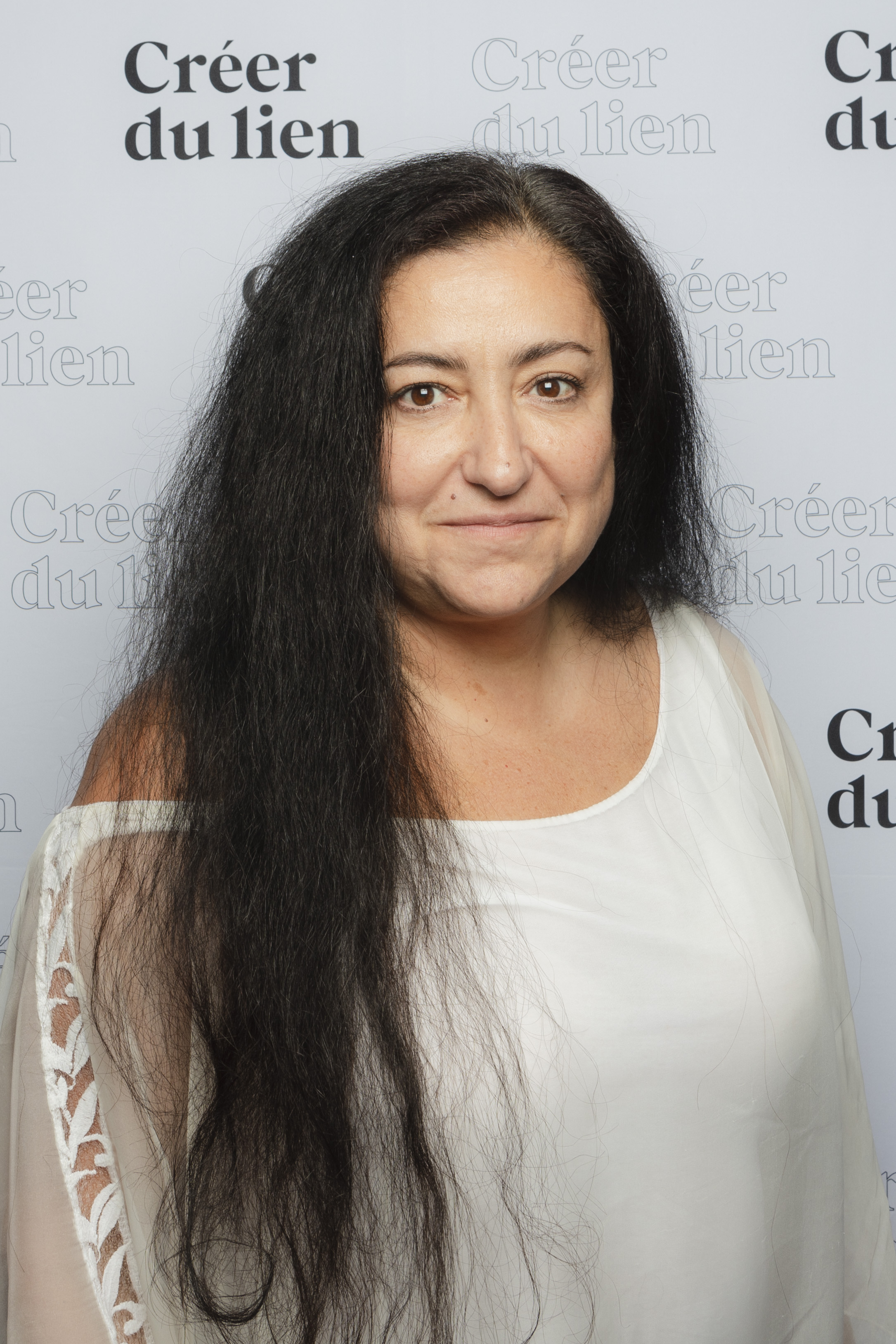

Member of the Canadian Parliament for Ahuntsic
- In office 23 January 2006 – 19 October 2015
- Preceded by: Eleni Bakopanos
- Succeeded by: Mélanie Joly

Personal details
- Born: 19 May 1969 (age 57) Abidjan, Côte d'Ivoire
- Party: New Democratic Party (2015–present)
- Other political affiliations: Bloc Québécois (2006–2013); Independent (2013–2015)
- Education: Université de Montréal
- Profession: Politician, criminologist, parole officer, rehabilitation counsellor, researcher, sociologist, teaching assistant, consultant

Maria Mourani (born 19 May 1969) is a Canadian politician who was elected as a member of Parliament in the federal riding of Ahuntsic in Canada.

She was formerly a member of the Bloc Québécois before leaving the party over its support for the proposed Quebec Charter of Values. She joined the New Democratic Party in November 2014 but was not a member of the party's caucus due to the party's policy against crossing the floor; she stood for the NDP in the 2015 Canadian federal election, but did not win. Mourani was the first woman of Lebanese origin elected to the Canadian House of Commons.

In 2017, she became the Quebec representative in the permanent delegation of Canada at UNESCO.

== Early life ==
Mourani was born in Abidjan, Ivory Coast. Of Lebanese descent, Mourani immigrated to Canada in 1988. She has held positions as rehabilitation consultant, professor, researcher, and parole officer. She is a former parole officer for Correctional Service of Canada. She is a former member of the Saint-Laurent volunteer action, Henri-Beaulieu school establishment council, Founoun artistic journal, Quebec Association of Criminologists, and the Reflection Committee and Social Action. She is the former President of the Bloc's citizen's committee and on the Parti Québécois riding executive in the provincial riding of Acadie and the Committee director of the PQ orientation congress. She was also a freelance writer for L'Avenir.

Mourani is also the author of La face cachée des gangs de rue (October 2006), a book about street gangs in Montreal. She followed it up with a second book on street gang networks in Canada, United States and Central America entitled Gangs de rue inc. (September 2009).

She was a co-founder and a co-president of the Canadian Lebanese Friendship Association in the Canadian Parliament as well as the President of the Algerian Canadian Friendship Association.

On 15 August 2008, she was awarded an honorary medal in Beirut, Lebanon by the World Lebanese Cultural Union (WLCU).

== Political career ==
In the 2003 Quebec election, she ran unsuccessfully as the PQ candidate in Acadie.

She was elected in the 2006 Canadian federal election and reelected in 2008 and 2011. She was consequently assigned as the Bloc Québécois Critic on Public Security and on the Status of Women in the Canadian Parliament.

After the 2011 federal election Mourani was one of only four Bloc Québécois MPs left in the House of Commons, the only Bloc member from the Montreal area, and the only female Bloc MP in the 41st Parliament.

She declared her candidacy in the Bloc Québécois leadership election that was held to choose a successor to Gilles Duceppe and ran on a platform of making the Bloc more independent from the Parti Québécois. She was defeated on the second ballot by former MP Daniel Paillé on 11 December 2011.

She was expelled from the Bloc Quebecois caucus on 12 September 2013, for opposing the Quebec Charter of Values and subsequently sat as an independent for the remainder of her term as MP.

On 18 December 2013, Mourani surprised citizens by announcing that she had renounced sovereigntism. She now believed that Canadian federalism was the best way to protect minority rights, and argued that the Charter of Rights and Freedoms was best suited to protect "the Quebec identity and all citizens of Quebec." She also accused the PQ of running its election campaign "on the backs of believers."

On 19 November 2014, Mourani announced that she would run for the NDP in the next election, though as per the party's policy on crossing the floor she remained an independent MP until the election.

On 21 January 2015 she was acclaimed the NDP's candidate in the renamed Ahuntsic-Cartierville for the 2015 Canadian federal election, but lost her seat to rival Liberal candidate Mélanie Joly.

After the 2015 elections, she opened a consultancy office Mourani-Criminologie on criminology with a concentration on issues of organized crime and gangs, juvenile delinquency, human trafficking, prostitution and international terrorism. She is a member of the Quebec Professional Order of Criminologists.

On 25 October 2017, the Quebec government nominated Mourani as the Quebec representative in the Permanent Delegation of Canada at the United Nations Educational, Scientific and Cultural Organization (UNESCO) in Paris replacing Julie Miville-Dechêne. She assumed her position on 5 December 2017.

She endorsed the Conservative Party of Canada ahead of the 2025 federal election.

== Bibliography ==
Books

- La face cachée des gangs de rue, Les Éditions de l'Homme, 2006, 211 pages ISBN 978-2-7619-2253-1
- Gangs de rue inc. : leurs réseaux au Canada et dans les Amériques, Les éditions de l'Homme, 2009, 416 pages, ISBN 978-2-7619-2683-6

Others

- Rose Dufour, Ina Motoi (preface by Maria Mourani and Hélène Manseau), La femme, sa sexualité et son pouvoir sexuel: programme d'appropriation de sa sexualité, Les Presses de l'Université du Québec, 2011
- Notre indépendance: 28 Québécois s'expriment (collective book), under the direction of Catherine Fillion-Lauzièr, Stanké, 2012

== Electoral record ==
2015 Canadian federal election: Ahuntsic-Cartierville
Party	Candidate	Votes	%	±%	Expenditures
Liberal	Mélanie Joly	26,026	46.8	+15.7	–
New Democratic	Maria Mourani	16,684	30.0	+0.1	–
Bloc Québécois	Nicolas Bourdon	7,346	13.2	-15.1	–
Conservative	Wiliam Moughrabi	4,051	7.3	-1.3	–
Green	Gilles Mercier	1,175	2.1	+0.7	–
Rhinoceros	Catherine Gascon-David	285	0.5	–	–
Total valid votes/expense limit		–	100.0		$220,041.13
Total rejected ballots		–	–	–	
Turnout		–	–	–	
Eligible voters		82,863			
Source: Elections Canada

2011 Canadian federal election: Ahuntsic
Party	Candidate	Votes	%	±%	Expenditures
Bloc Québécois	Maria Mourani	14,908	31.80	-7.68	
New Democratic	Chantal Reeves	14,200	30.29	+21.32	
Liberal	Noushig Eloyan	13,087	27.91	-10.68	
Conservative	Constantin Kiryakidis	3,770	8.04	-2.32	
Green	Ted Kouretas	620	1.32	-1.25	
Rhinoceros	Jean-Olivier Berthiaume	299	0.64	–	
Total valid votes/expense limit		46,884	100.00		
Total rejected ballots		516	1.09	-	
Turnout		47,400	64.98	-0.66	
Bloc Québécois hold		Swing		-14.50	

2008 Canadian federal election: Ahuntsic
Party	Candidate	Votes	%	±%	Expenditures
Bloc Québécois	Maria Mourani	18,815	39.48	+0.57	$53,286
Liberal	Eleni Bakopanos	18,392	38.59	+1.30	$51,887
Conservative	Jean Précourt	4,937	10.36	-1.89	$56,496
New Democratic	Alexandra Bélec	4,276	8.97	+1.07	$6,663
Green	Lynette Tremblay	1,228	2.57	-1.10	$20
Total valid votes/expense limit		47,648	100.00	–	$82,379
Total rejected ballots		523	1.09		
Turnout		48,181	65.64		
Bloc Québécois hold		Swing		-0.40	

2006 Canadian federal election: Ahuntsic
Party	Candidate	Votes	%	±%	Expenditures
Bloc Québécois	Maria Mourani	19,428	38.91	-2.34	$69,180
Liberal	Eleni Bakopanos	18,594	37.24	-6.51	$64,168
Conservative	Etienne Morin	6,089	12.25	+7.01	$16,100
New Democratic	Caroline Desrosiers	3,948	7.90	+1.70	$4,702
Green	Lynette Tremblay	1,836	3.67	+0.99	$411
Total valid votes/expense limit		49,895	100.00	$77,453	
Bloc Québécois gain from Liberal		Swing		-2.1	

2004 Canadian federal election: Ahuntsic
Party	Candidate	Votes	%	±%	Expenditures
Liberal	Eleni Bakopanos	21,234	43.75	-10.13	$59,946
Bloc Québécois	Maria Mourani	20,020	41.25	+9.02	$53,286
New Democratic	Annick Bergeron	3,013	6.20	+4.33	$3,308
Conservative	Jean E. Fortier	2,544	5.24	-3.85	$39,703
Green	Lynette Tremblay	1,301	2.68	+0.57	$2,388
Marijuana	F.X. de Longchamp	314	0.64	–	
Marxist–Leninist	Marsha Fine	102	0.21	-0.09	
Total valid votes/expense limit		48,528	100.00	$77,288	
Liberal hold		Swing	-9.6		

2003 Quebec general election: Acadie
Party	Candidate	Votes	%	±%
Liberal	Yvan Bordeleau	23,211	70.39	−4.80
Parti Québécois	Maria Mourani	6,702	20.33	+1.22
Action démocratique	Jean-Pierre Chamoun	2,253	6.83	+2.18
Bloc Pot	Jonathan Bérubé	440	1.33	–
Independent	André Parizeau	161	0.49	–
Marxist–Leninist	Linda Sullivan	111	0.34	–
Equality	Marina Paümann	95	0.29	–
Total valid votes		32,973	99.05	–
Total rejected ballots		316	0.95	–
Turnout		33,289	65.66	−12.39
Electors on the lists		50,699	–	–
