= Acadie (electoral district) =

Provincial electoral district in Quebec, Canada

Coordinates: 45.52°N 73.68°W

Quebec electoral district
- Location in Montreal

Provincial electoral district
- Legislature: National Assembly of Quebec
MNA
André Morin
Liberal
- District created: 1972
- First contested: 1973
- Last contested: 2026

Demographics
- Population (2021): 82,340
- Electors (2014): 49,413
- Area (km²): 14.9
- Pop. density (per km²): 5,526.2
- Census division: Montreal (part)
- Census subdivision: Montreal (part)

Acadie (pronounced [akadi]) is a provincial electoral district in Quebec, Canada, which elects a member to the National Assembly of Quebec. It is located in northern Montreal and consists of parts of the Saint-Laurent and Ahuntsic-Cartierville boroughs.

It was created as L'Acadie ([lakadi]) for the 1973 general election from parts of the Ahuntsic and Saint-Laurent electoral districts. It changed to its present name in 1989. In the change from the 2001 to the 2011 electoral map, its territory was unchanged.

Since 2022 its Member of the National Assembly (MNA) has been André Morin of the Quebec Liberal Party.

== Members of the National Assembly ==
| Legislature | Years | Member | Party |
|---|---|---|---|
L'Acadie; Riding created from Ahuntsic and Saint-Laurent
| 30th | 1973–1976 | François Cloutier | Liberal |
| 31st | 1976–1981 | Thérèse Lavoie-Roux | Liberal |
| 32nd | 1981–1985 | Thérèse Lavoie-Roux | Liberal |
| 33rd | 1985–1989 | Thérèse Lavoie-Roux | Liberal |
Acadie
| 34th | 1989–1994 | Yvan Bordeleau | Liberal |
| 35th | 1994–1998 | Yvan Bordeleau | Liberal |
| 36th | 1998–2003 | Yvan Bordeleau | Liberal |
| 37th | 2003–2007 | Yvan Bordeleau | Liberal |
| 38th | 2007–2008 | Christine St-Pierre | Liberal |
| 39th | 2008–2012 | Christine St-Pierre | Liberal |
| 40th | 2012–2014 | Christine St-Pierre | Liberal |
| 41st | 2014–2018 | Christine St-Pierre | Liberal |
| 42nd | 2018–2022 | Christine St-Pierre | Liberal |
| 43rd | 2022–2026 | André Morin | Liberal |
| 44th | 2026–Present | André Morin | Liberal |

== Election results ==
2026 Quebec general election
** Preliminary results — Not yet official **
| Party | Candidate | Votes | % | ±% |
|---|---|---|---|---|
| Liberal | André Albert Morin | 12,935 | 49.23 | +6.97 |
| Québec solidaire | Marie-Laurence Nault | 5,159 | 19.63 | +2.43 |
| Parti Québécois | Pierrick Jasmin | 3,445 | 13.11 | +3.24 |
| Conservative | Amine Difallah | 2,435 | 9.27 | –2.10 |
| Coalition Avenir Québec | Christian Gnali | 1,500 | 5.71 | –11.40 |
| Canadian | Roula Al-Nseir | 391 | 1.49 | N/A |
| Green | Ahmad Elmawieh | 230 | 0.88 | –1.31 |
| Parti nul | Elizabeth Dupuis | 182 | 0.69 | N/A |
| Total valid votes | | 26,277 | 98.31 | –0.05 |
| Total rejected ballots | | 451 | 1.69 | +0.05 |
| Turnout | | 26,728 | 53.14 | –0.31 |
| Electors on the lists | | 50,296 | | |
| Liberal hold | | Swing | | +2.27 |
Source: Élections Québec

2022 Quebec general election
| Party | Candidate | Votes | % | ±% |
|---|---|---|---|---|
| Liberal | André A. Morin | 10,981 | 42.26 | -11.54 |
| Québec solidaire | Elyse Lévesque | 4,468 | 17.20 | +3.45 |
| Coalition Avenir Québec | Rosmeri Otoya Celis | 4,446 | 17.11 | +0.60 |
| Conservative | Stéphanie Gentile | 2,955 | 11.37 | +9.19 |
| Parti Québécois | Véronique Lecours | 2,565 | 9.87 | +0.87 |
| Green | Roula Al Nseir | 569 | 2.19 | -0.58 |
| Total valid votes | | 25,984 | 98.36 | |
| Total rejected ballots | | 434 | 1.64 | |
| Turnout | | 26,418 | 53.45 | |
| Electors on the lists | | 49,427 | | |

2018 Quebec general election
| Party | Candidate | Votes | % | ±% |
|---|---|---|---|---|
| Liberal | Christine St-Pierre | 14,305 | 53.80 | -17.16 |
| Coalition Avenir Québec | Sophie Chiasson | 4,391 | 16.51 | +7.57 |
| Québec solidaire | Viviane Martinova-Croteau | 3,656 | 13.75 | +7.18 |
| Parti Québécois | Farida Sam | 2,394 | 9.00 | -2.68 |
| Green | Laurence Sicotte | 737 | 2.77 | +1.58 |
| Conservative | Jocelyn Chouinard | 579 | 2.18 | – |
| New Democratic | Michel Welt | 442 | 1.66 | – |
| Marxist–Leninist | Yvon Breton | 87 | 0.33 | +0.13 |
| Total valid votes | | 26,591 | 98.50 | |
| Total rejected ballots | | 406 | 1.50 | |
| Turnout | | 26,997 | 54.17 | -15.53 |
| Eligible voters | | 49,838 | | |
| Liberal hold | | Swing | | -12.37 |
Source(s) "Rapport des résultats officiels du scrutin". Élections Québec.

2014 Quebec general election
| Party | Candidate | Votes | % | ±% |
|---|---|---|---|---|
| Liberal | Christine St-Pierre | 24,211 | 70.96 | +15.31 |
| Parti Québécois | Évelyne Abitbol | 3,985 | 11.68 | -5.54 |
| Coalition Avenir Québec | Serge Pourreaux | 3,050 | 8.94 | -8.52 |
| Québec solidaire | Geneviève Dick | 2,241 | 6.57 | -1.44 |
| Green | Alix Nyaburerwa | 405 | 1.19 | – |
| Option nationale | Julie Boivin | 162 | 0.47 | -1.19 |
| Marxist–Leninist | Yvon Breton | 67 | 0.20 | – |
| Total valid votes | | 34,121 | 99.08 | – |
| Total rejected ballots | | 318 | 0.92 | – |
| Turnout | | 34,459 | 69.70 | +4.94 |
| Electors | | 49,413 | – | – |
| Liberal hold | | Swing | | +10.43 |

2012 Quebec general election
| Party | Candidate | Votes | % | ±% |
|---|---|---|---|---|
| Liberal | Christine St-Pierre | 17,191 | 55.65 | -11.51 |
| Coalition Avenir Québec | Abel-Claude Aslanian | 5,393 | 17.46 | +13.11* |
| Parti Québécois | Rachid Bandou | 5,319 | 17.22 | -3.70 |
| Québec solidaire | Marianne Breton Fontaine | 2,474 | 8.01 | +3.76 |
| Option nationale | Sebastien Croteau | 512 | 1.66 | – |
| Total valid votes | | 30,889 | 98.67 | – |
| Total rejected ballots | | 416 | 1.33 | – |
| Turnout | | 31,305 | 64.76 | +17.85 |
| Electors | | 48,339 | – | – |

* Result compared to Action démocratique

2008 Quebec general election
| Party | Candidate | Votes | % | ±% |
|---|---|---|---|---|
| Liberal | Christine St-Pierre | 15,145 | 67.16 | +7.07 |
| Parti Québécois | Marc-André Nolet | 4,718 | 20.92 | +4.29 |
| Action démocratique | Ahamed Badawy | 982 | 4.35 | -10.12 |
| Québec solidaire | André Parizeau | 958 | 4.25 | +0.45 |
| Green | Nicolas Rémillard-Tessier | 747 | 3.31 | -1.71 |
| Total valid votes | | 22,550 | 98.67 | – |
| Total rejected ballots | | 304 | 1.33 | – |
| Turnout | | 22,854 | 46.91 | -15.12 |
| Electors | | 48,719 | – | – |

2007 Quebec general election: Acadie
| Party | Candidate | Votes | % | ±% |
|---|---|---|---|---|
| Liberal | Christine St-Pierre | 17,962 | 60.09 | −10.30 |
| Parti Québécois | Frédéric Lapointe | 4,970 | 16.63 | −3.70 |
| Action démocratique | Charles Ghorayeb | 4,327 | 14.47 | +7.64 |
| Green | Nicolas Rémillard-Tessier | 1,500 | 5.02 | – |
| Québec solidaire | André Parizeau | 1,135 | 3.80 | +3.31 |
| Total valid votes | | 29,894 | 98.93 | – |
| Total rejected ballots | | 322 | 1.07 | – |
| Turnout | | 30,216 | 62.03 | −3.63 |
| Electors | | 48,712 | – | – |
| Liberal hold | | Swing | | -3.30 |
Source: Official Results, Le Directeur général des élections du Québec.

2003 Quebec general election
| Party | Candidate | Votes | % | ±% |
|---|---|---|---|---|
| Liberal | Yvan Bordeleau | 23,211 | 70.39 | −4.80 |
| Parti Québécois | Maria Mourani | 6,702 | 20.33 | +1.22 |
| Action démocratique | Jean-Pierre Chamoun | 2,253 | 6.83 | +2.18 |
| Bloc Pot | Jonathan Bérubé | 440 | 1.33 | – |
| Independent | André Parizeau | 161 | 0.49 | – |
| Marxist–Leninist | Linda Sullivan | 111 | 0.34 | – |
| Equality | Marina Paümann | 95 | 0.29 | – |
| Total valid votes | | 32,973 | 99.05 | – |
| Total rejected ballots | | 316 | 0.95 | – |
| Turnout | | 33,289 | 65.66 | −12.39 |
| Electors on the lists | | 50,699 | – | – |

1985 Quebec general election
| Party | Candidate | Votes | % | ±% |
|---|---|---|---|---|
| Liberal | Thérèse Lavoie-Roux | 22,572 | 74.04 | +5.87 |
| Parti Québécois | Jean Cermakian | 6,617 | 21.70 | -8.68 |
| New Democratic | Charles Suissa | 946 | 3.10 | – |
| Christian Socialist | André Lambert | 190 | 0.62 | – |
| Commonwealth of Canada | Louis Beauchemin | 165 | 0.54 | – |
| Total valid votes | | 30,489 | 98.16 | – |
| Total rejected ballots | | 572 | 1.84 | – |
| Turnout | | 31,061 | 75.38 | -8.54 |
| Eligible voters | | 41,206 | – | – |
| Liberal hold | | Swing | | +7.28 |
Source: Official Results, Élections Québec.

1981 Quebec general election
| Party | Candidate | Votes | % | ±% |
|---|---|---|---|---|
| Liberal | Thérèse Lavoie-Roux | 22,784 | 68.17 | +22.67 |
| Parti Québécois | Jean-Paul Martel | 10,154 | 30.38 | -0.89 |
| Union Nationale | Robert Turcotte | 369 | 1.10 | -19.69 |
| Independent | Jean-Michel Durocher | 118 | 0.35 | – |
| Total valid votes | | 33,425 | 99.05 | – |
| Total rejected ballots | | 322 | 0.95 | – |
| Turnout | | 33,747 | 83.92 | -2.16 |
| Eligible voters | | 40,214 | – | – |
| Liberal hold | | Swing | | +11.78 |
Source: Official Results, Élections Québec.

== See also ==
- List of Quebec provincial electoral districts
- Canadian provincial electoral districts
