= Ahuntsic-Cartierville (electoral district) =

Federal electoral district in Quebec, Canada

Coordinates: 45.545°N 73.67°W

Quebec electoral district
- Interactive map of riding boundaries from the 2025 federal election

Federal electoral district
- Legislature: House of Commons
MP
Mélanie Joly
Liberal
- District created: 2013
- First contested: 2015
- Last contested: 2025
- District webpage: profile, map

Demographics
- Population (2016): 117,447
- Electors (2019): 83,176
- Area (km²): 21.72
- Pop. density (per km²): 5,407.3
- Census division: Montreal (part)
- Census subdivision: Montreal (part)

Ahuntsic-Cartierville (Canadian French pronunciation: [aɔntsɪk kaʁt͡sjevɪl]) is a federal electoral district in Quebec, Canada, which has been represented in the House of Commons since 2015.

Ahuntsic-Cartierville was created by the 2012 federal electoral boundaries redistribution and was legally defined in the 2013 representation order. It came into effect upon the call of the 2015 Canadian federal election, held on 19 October 2015. It was created from parts of Ahuntsic (80%) and Saint-Laurent—Cartierville (20%). Following the 2022 Canadian federal electoral redistribution, it lost all of its territory south of Boul. Acadie and east of Boul. Henri-Bourassa to Saint-Laurent.

Since 2015 its MP has been Mélanie Joly of the Liberal Party.

== Geography ==
The riding comprises the borough of Ahuntsic-Cartierville in Montreal, excluding west of the Acadie boulevard, between the intersections of Henri-Bourassa and Crémazie Boulevards, which is part of the riding of Saint-Laurent and the neighbourhood of Sault-au-Récollet, which is part of the riding of Bourassa.

== Demographics ==
According to the 2016 Canadian census

- Languages: (2016) 64.0% French, 10.4% English, 7.0% Arabic, 2.7% Spanish, 2.3% Armenian, 2.0% Greek, 1.7% Italian, 0.9% Vietnamese, 0.9% Romanian, 0.8% Creole, 0.7% Tamil, 0.7% Urdu, 0.6% Cantonese, 0.5% Mandarin, 0.5% Portuguese

== Members of Parliament ==
Parliament	Years	Member	Party
Ahuntsic-Cartierville; Riding created from Ahuntsic and Saint-Laurent—Cartierville
42nd	2015–2019	Mélanie Joly	Liberal
43rd	2019–2021	Mélanie Joly	Liberal
44th	2021–2025	Mélanie Joly	Liberal
45th	2025–present	Mélanie Joly	Liberal

== Election results ==
Graph of election results in Ahuntsic-Cartierville (minor parties that never got 2% of the vote or didn't run consistently are omitted)

2025 Canadian federal election
Party	Candidate	Votes	%	±%	Expenditures
Liberal	Mélanie Joly	30,833	60.96	+9.05	$87,587.41
Bloc Québécois	Nabila Ben Youssef	8,538	16.88	–5.74	$8,241.44
Conservative	Margie Ramos	7,600	15.03	+6.87	$7,292.29
New Democratic	Idil Issa	3,333	6.59	–5.13	$1,840.85
Marxist–Leninist	Linda Sullivan	273	0.54	N/A	$0.00
Total valid votes/expense limit		50,577	98.31	+0.35	$126,245.59
Total rejected ballots		871	1.69	–0.35	
Turnout		51,448	67.35		
Eligible voters		76,387			
Liberal notional hold		Swing		+7.40	
Source: Elections Canada
Note: number of eligible voters does not include voting day registrations.

2021 Canadian federal election
Party	Candidate	Votes	%	±%	Expenditures
Liberal	Mélanie Joly	26,402	52.38	–0.07	$71,604.96
Bloc Québécois	Anna Simonyan	11,112	22.04	+0.31	$12,053.64
New Democratic	Ghada Chaabi	5,844	11.59	+0.19	$3,163.17
Conservative	Steven Duarte	4,247	8.43	+1.15	$0.00
Green	Luc Joli-Coeur	1,491	2.96	–3.12	$0.00
People's	Manon Chevalier	1,313	2.60	+1.54	$1,694.83
Total valid votes		50,409	100.00	–	$110,827.67
Total rejected ballots		1,054	2.05	+0.23	
Turnout		51,463	64.16	–3.34	
Eligible voters		80,206			
Liberal hold		Swing		–0.19	
Source: Elections Canada

2021 federal election redistributed results
Party	Vote	%
Liberal	25,150	51.91
Bloc Québécois	10,962	22.62
New Democratic	5,678	11.72
Conservative	3,956	8.16
Green	1,449	2.99
People's	1,256	2.59

2019 Canadian federal election
Party	Candidate	Votes	%	±%	Expenditures
Liberal	Mélanie Joly	28,904	52.45	+5.65	$75,399.95
Bloc Québécois	André Parizeau	11,974	21.73	+8.53	none listed
New Democratic	Zahia El-Masri	6,284	11.4	−18.6	none listed
Conservative	Kathy Laframboise	4,013	7.28	−0.02	$0.00
Green	Jean-Michel Lavarenne	3,352	6.08	+3.98	$7,837.28
People's	Raymond Ayas	584	1.06		$7,512.42
Total valid votes/expense limit		55,111	100.0		
Total rejected ballots		1,022			
Turnout		56,133	67.5		
Eligible voters		83,176			
Liberal hold		Swing		−1.44	
Source: Elections Canada

2015 Canadian federal election
Party	Candidate	Votes	%	±%	Expenditures
Liberal	Mélanie Joly	26,026	46.8	+15.7	$149,387.67
New Democratic	Maria Mourani	16,684	30.0	+0.1	$86,722.49
Bloc Québécois	Nicolas Bourdon	7,346	13.2	-15.1	$27,931.96
Conservative	Wiliam Moughrabi	4,051	7.3	-1.3	$12,346.58
Green	Gilles Mercier	1,175	2.1	+0.7	–
Rhinoceros	Catherine Gascon-David	285	0.5	–	–
Total valid votes/Expense limit		–	100.0		$220,041.13
Total rejected ballots		–	–	–	
Turnout		–	–	–	
Eligible voters		82,863			
Source: Elections Canada

2011 federal election redistributed results
Party	Vote	%
Liberal	15,127	31.1
New Democratic	14,550	29.9
Bloc Québécois	13,765	28.3
Conservative	4,168	8.6
Green	708	1.4
Others	283	0.6

== See also ==
- List of Canadian electoral districts
- Historical federal electoral districts of Canada
