= Eleni Bakopanos =

Canadian politician (born 1954)

The Honourable Eleni Bakopanos PC

Member of the Canadian Parliament for Saint-Denis
- In office 1993–1997
- Preceded by: Marcel Prud'homme
- Succeeded by: riding dissolved

Member of the Canadian Parliament for Ahuntsic
- In office 1997–2006
- Preceded by: Michel Daviault
- Succeeded by: Maria Mourani

Personal details
- Born: May 10, 1954 (age 72) Argos, Greece
- Party: Liberal

Eleni Bakopanos, PC (born May 10, 1954 in Argos, Greece) is a Canadian politician.

Bakopanos was a member of the Liberal Party of Canada in the House of Commons of Canada, representing the riding of Ahuntsic from 1997 to 2006, and Saint-Denis from 1993 to 1997 and is the first Greek-born woman to be elected to Parliament. Bakopanos has been an executive, and a policy adviser. Formerly Assistant Deputy Chairman of Committees of the Whole, and a former Parliamentary Secretary to the Minister of Justice and Attorney General of Canada (1997–1999). Bakopanos was named Parliamentary Secretary to the Minister of Social Development with special emphasis on Social Economy on July 20, 2004. Bakopanos has served as Chair of the Standing Committee on Citizenship and Immigration and as Vice-Chair of the Standing Committee on Canadian Heritage.

In the spring 2004, Bakopanos wrote a booklet titled Political Recruiting and Women in the Political Process. She argues that women continue to face serious obstacles to full participation in public life. She suggests that women bring a different character to the policy making process and they should be encouraged to enter politics in greater numbers.

Bakopanos holds a Bachelor of Arts with honours in political science and history from McGill University, where she also studied law. She is married and is the mother of two daughters.

Bakopanos sought a return to parliament in the 2008 federal election, but was unsuccessful.

She ran in the provincial riding of Crémazie in the 2012 election for the Quebec Liberal Party but was defeated.
