= Yvan Bordeleau =

Canadian politician

Yvan Bordeleau (born February 19, 1942, in La Sarre) was the Member of the National Assembly (MNA) Quebec, Canada, for the Montreal provincial electoral district of Acadie from 1989 to 2007.

== Biography ==
Bordeleau holds a doctoral degree in psychology from the Université de Montréal and is a former university professor. Bordeleau held the riding of Acadie as a member of the Quebec Liberal Party (QLP) from the 1989 election on September 25, 1989. He was re-elected in the subsequent elections of 1994, 1998, and 2003. Bordeleau served as the parliamentary assistant to the Minister of Education, Jean-Marc Fournier, a position he held from March 2, 2005. Before holding this position he was the parliamentary assistant to the Deputy Premier Monique Gagnon-Tremblay from May 23, 2003, to March 2, 2005.

On January 15, 2007, Bordeleau announced that he would not solicit a fifth mandate as MNA for Acadie.

== Electoral record (incomplete) ==
2003 Quebec general election: Acadie
Party	Candidate	Votes	%	±%
Liberal	Yvan Bordeleau	23,211	70.39	−4.80
Parti Québécois	Maria Mourani	6,702	20.33	+1.22
Action démocratique	Jean-Pierre Chamoun	2,253	6.83	+2.18
Bloc Pot	Jonathan Bérubé	440	1.33	–
Independent	André Parizeau	161	0.49	–
Marxist–Leninist	Linda Sullivan	111	0.34	–
Equality	Marina Paümann	95	0.29	–
Total valid votes		32,973	99.05	–
Total rejected ballots		316	0.95	–
Turnout		33,289	65.66	−12.39
Electors on the lists		50,699	–	–

1989 Quebec general election: Acadie
Party	Candidate	Votes	%
Liberal	Yvan Bordeleau	19,077	65.62
Parti Québécois	André Gagnon	7,426	25.54
New Democratic	François Salvas	1,083	3.72
Lemon	Christian Coutu	848	2.92
Commonwealth of Canada	Gilles Gervais	640	2.20
Total valid votes		29,074	
Rejected and declined votes		1,045	
Turnout		30,119	74.72
Electors on the lists		40,308	
Source: Official Results, Le Directeur général des élections du Québec.

== See also ==
- Politics of Quebec
- Quebec general elections
- Quebec Liberal Party
