= Paul Cappon =

Paul Cappon is a Canadian academic, administrator, medical doctor, politician, and activist. He is perhaps best known for having led the Canadian Council on Learning throughout its existence from 2004 to 2012.

== Early life and activism ==
Cappon has a Bachelor of Arts degree in Political Science and Economics from McGill University (1968), a Master's degree (1970) and doctorate (1972) in Sociology from the University of Paris, and a Doctor of Medicine degree from McMaster University (1980). He also has specialty qualification in family medicine from Dalhousie University and in community medicine from the province of Quebec.

Cappon was based in Halifax, Nova Scotia during the mid-1980s and was a prominent member of the Coalition Against Nuclear War organization in that city. He also served as a Maritime provinces representative on the executive of Physicians for Social Responsibility. In 1983, he wrote an opinion piece in The Globe and Mail newspaper opposing cruise missile testing in Canada and arguing that the missile itself would be a destabilizing factor in international diplomacy. The following year, he arranged for $75,000 worth of hospital equipment and medical supplies to be sent to Saint Lucia.

Cappon subsequently moved to Montreal, Quebec, where he founded the Montreal General Hospital's Centre for Nuclear Disarmament and Community Health and worked at McGill University. In 1987, he organized a cultural exchange trip in which thirty Quebec schoolchildren visited Moscow, then the capital of the Soviet Union. Cappon was subsequently a prominent organizer for the eighth annual Congress of International Physicians for the Prevention of Nuclear War, held in Montreal in June 1988.

== Quebec New Democratic Party president ==
At one time a member of the Liberal Party, Cappon ran for the House of Commons of Canada under the banner of the New Democratic Party (NDP) in the 1988 federal election, ultimately finishing third in Laval. At one stage in this campaign, seven NDP candidates in Quebec issued a policy statement that was not authorized by the party leadership, attacking official bilingualism and calling for the provincial government to have sole jurisdiction over the protection and promotion of the French language in Quebec. Cappon opposed this statement, saying that it could turn Anglophone Quebecers into second-class citizens.

Cappon was elected as president of the federal branch of New Democratic Party in Quebec on April 30, 1989, the date on which the provincial branch of the Quebec NDP became autonomous from the federal party. Cappon approved of the separation of the two parties, noting that would permit Canadian federalists in Quebec to join the federal party without automatically joining the more nationalist provincial group.

Cappon subsequently urged Bob Rae to run for the federal NDP leadership in the 1989 leadership election, saying that the Quebec wing of the party would be solidly behind him. Rae chose not to run; Cappon, along with many Quebec delegates, supported Steven Langdon on the first two ballots of the party's leadership convention before shifting to the eventual winner, Audrey McLaughlin.

In early 1990, NDP candidate Phil Edmonston won a federal by-election in Chambly to become the NDP's first elected member from the province of Quebec. During the campaign, Edmonston criticized his own party's position on the proposed Meech Lake Accord; the NDP had called for amendments to the accord, while Edmonston favoured retention of the original language in its entirety, a view favoured by supporters of Quebec nationalism. Cappon criticized Edmonston's position, saying that he should not be allowed to campaign against party policy. Edmonston and Cappon subsequently emerged as bitter rivals, and Cappon resigned as president in June 1990 after Edmonston's supporters pushed through a vote of non-confidence in his leadership at a quarterly meeting of the Quebec party's federal council. In resigning, Cappon said that the federal NDP in Quebec had become "an empty shell for [Edmonston]'s personal ambitions."

Cappon initially planned to seek the NDP's nomination in Laurier—Sainte-Marie for an August 1990 by-election, but he withdrew his candidacy in light of his quarrel with Edmonston. In a telephone interview, he stated, "The party is going nowhere in Quebec and I don't want to associate my prestige with running as a candidate at this time." In 1991, Cappon left Quebec to take a position at Laurentian University in Sudbury, Ontario. He has not been publicly associated with any political party since this time.

== Education advocate ==
Cappon served as Vice President, Academic at Laurentian University from 1991 to 1996. In July 1996, he was appointed as director general of Council of Ministers of Education, Canada (CMEC), an intergovernmental body made up of ministers of education and advanced education from Canada's provinces and territories. In this capacity, Cappon became a frequent commentator in the Canadian media on a variety of issues surrounding education.

On October 31, 2004, Cappon assumed the rules of CEO and president of the Canadian Council on Learning, a newly created national learning think tank. In 2005, he announced a comprehensive strategy to inform Canadians on the links between health and learning. In May of the following year, he issued the council's first annual report on the state of Canadian learning, consisting of an exhaustive report of trends throughout Canada. He also continued to be a frequently cited source on education issues generally.

In December 2006, Cappon called for a national strategy and better quality control in relation to post-secondary education, warning that other countries were far exceeding Canada in developing targets for funding, graduation rates, class size, and other matters. In a line that he would repeat several times in the following years, he warned that other jurisdictions would "eat our lunch" if Canada did not develop an effective national strategy.

Cappon and Assembly of First Nations leader Phil Fontaine announced a new framework for evaluating learning in Canada's indigenous communities in November 2007.

The government of Stephen Harper removed funding from he Canadian Council on Learning in March 2010, on the basis of what some commentators believe were ideological motivations. The council continued to operate until 2012, at which time its operations wound down. In September 2010, Cappon introduced a new study warning of a projected rise in the percentage of adults with low literacy skills in Canada's major cities.

After the council ceased operations, Cappon became a senior fellow at the University of Ottawa's graduate school of international and public policy.

== Electoral record ==
1988 Canadian federal election: Laval
Party	Candidate	Votes	%	±%
Progressive Conservative	Guy Ricard (incumbent)	26,858	49.11	
Liberal	Céline Hervieux-Payette	18,819	34.41	
New Democratic	Paul Cappon	8,546	15.63	
Commonwealth of Canada	Mario Ouellet	468	0.86	
Total valid votes		54,691	100.00	–
Total rejected ballots		1,331	–	–
Turnout		56,022	79.25	–
Electors on the lists		70,688	–	–
Source: Report of the Chief Electoral Officer, Thirty-fourth General Election, 1988.
