= Igor Gouzenko =

Russian defector to Canada (1919–1982)

- Игорь Сергеевич Гузенко
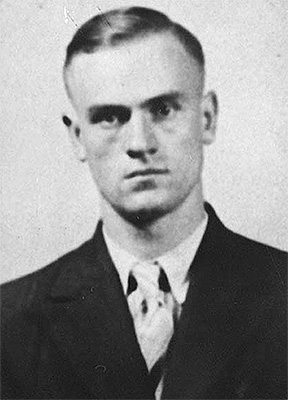
- Gouzenko in 1946
- Born: Igor Sergeyevich Gouzenko; January 26, 1919; Dmitrov, Moscow Governorate, Russian SFSR
- Died: June 25, 1982 (aged 63); Mississauga, Ontario, Canada
- Other name: George Brown
- Occupation: Cipher clerk
- Known for: Exposing Soviet spy ring in Canada

Igor Sergeyevich Gouzenko (Russian: Игорь Сергеевич Гузенко; January 26, 1919 – June 25, 1982) was a cipher clerk for the Soviet embassy to Canada in Ottawa, Ontario, and a lieutenant of the Soviet Main Intelligence Directorate (GRU). He defected on September 5, 1945, three days after the end of World War II, with 109 documents on the USSR's espionage activities in the West. In response, Canada's Prime Minister, Mackenzie King, called a royal commission to investigate espionage in Canada.

Gouzenko exposed Soviet intelligence's efforts to steal nuclear secrets as well as the technique of planting sleeper agents. The "Gouzenko Affair" is often credited as a triggering event of the Cold War, with historian Jack Granatstein stating it was "the beginning of the Cold War for public opinion" and journalist Robert Fulford writing he was "absolutely certain the Cold War began in Ottawa". Granville Hicks described Gouzenko's actions as having "awakened the people of North America to the magnitude and the danger of Soviet espionage".

== Background ==
Gouzenko was born on January 26, 1919, in the village of Rogachev near Dmitrov, Moscow Governorate (now Moscow Oblast), 100 kilometres north-west of Moscow. He was the youngest of four children.

His older brother (also Igor, Gouzenko is named in memory of him), born in 1917, died at age 1 from malnutrition. His father fought in the Russian Civil War on the side of the Bolsheviks, dying early of typhoid. His mother was a school mathematics teacher. Faced with the prospect of her second child dying of starvation, Gouzenko's mother decided to place him in the care of her mother, Ekaterina A. Filkova, in the village of Semion, Ryazan Oblast, Russia, where he lived for seven years. Later his mother took Igor to her relatives in Rostov-on-Don, and she got a job in the village of Verkhne-Spasskoe, after which she moved to Moscow, and after some time, she took all the children. Igor Gouzenko entered the fifth grade in the school named after Maxim Gorky near the Automotive Factory No. 2 Zavod Imeni Stalina.

Gouzenko spent a lot of time in the Lenin Library, where he prepared for admission to the university and then entered the Moscow Architectural Institute. While at the institute he met his future wife Svetlana (Anna) Gouseva in the Lenin Library; the couple married soon after meeting.

Due to his high academic performance, he was sent to the Military Engineering Academy named after V.V. Kuybyshev, where he was trained for a year as a cipher clerk, graduating with the rank of lieutenant. At the start of World War II he was conscripted into the Red Army. He served in the central apparatus of the GRU (April, 1942 — summer of 1943). His position gave him knowledge of Soviet espionage activities in the West. Gouzenko worked under the leadership of Colonel Nikolai Zabotin.

== Defection ==
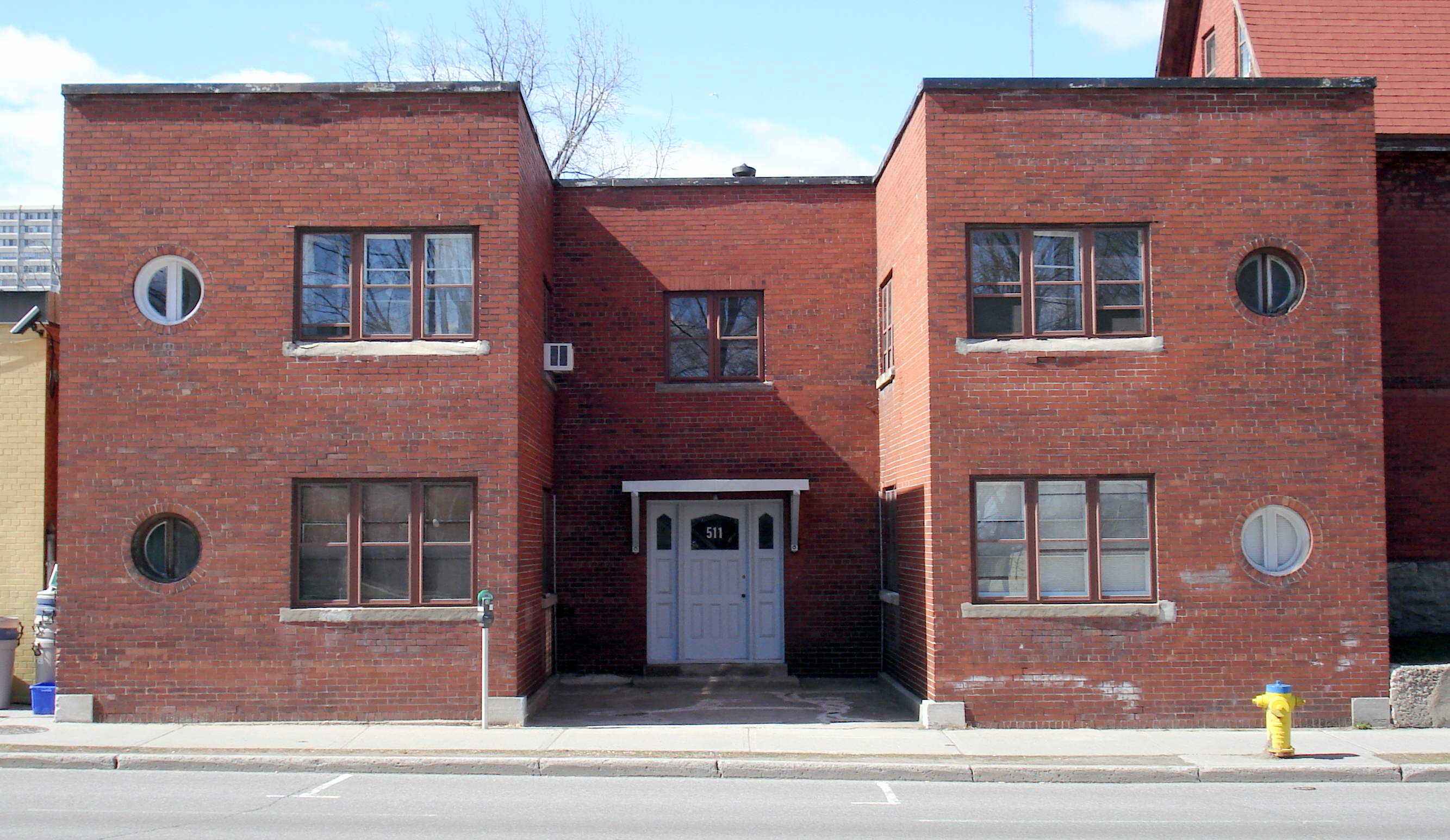
Gouzenko's Somerset Street apartment (upper right, facing street) in 2007

In June 1943 Gouzenko arrived in Ottawa, Canada, to work at the Soviet Embassy, his first overseas mission. In October, his pregnant wife joined him.

Gouzenko's family was given the uncommon opportunity to live outside the embassy compound where most of the staff's families lived. Gouzenko was allowed to live in an apartment in the city with Canadian families. In September 1944, Gouzenko learned that he and his family were being recalled to the Soviet Union. His supervisor, Zabotin, asked for a reprieve. Unwilling to return to the Soviet Union, due to being dissatisfied with the quality of life and the policies of the Soviet Union, he decided to defect. As an example of the freedoms Gouzenko recalls in his testimony, he mentions the elections in Canada in 1945, whereas in the USSR, according to him, there were no free elections and one had to choose from a single candidate. On September 5, 1945, three days after the end of World War II, the 26-year-old Gouzenko walked out of the embassy carrying a briefcase with Soviet code books and decryption materials, a total of 109 documents.

In a later statement, Gouzenko described how he first wanted to go to the Royal Canadian Mounted Police (RCMP) because he knew that there were no Soviet military agents there, but he was not sure that there were no NKVD agents. He then went to the Ottawa Journal, but when he reached the editor-in-chief, he hesitated to make a statement. When he returned later, the editor-in-chief was no longer at work, and the paper's night editor did not venture to take responsibility, and suggested he go to the Department of Justice but nobody was on duty when he arrived there.

The next morning, September 6, he returned with his wife and child to the Department of Justice and asked to see the minister; after waiting several hours, he was denied an appointment. Then he returned to the newspaper and spoke with reporter Elizabeth Fraser, who advised him to contact the naturalization bureau. Later that day, Gouzenko applied for Canadian citizenship.

By noon that day, Prime Minister of Canada William Lyon Mackenzie King was informed of the incident, which later led him to convene a Royal Commission to investigate espionage in Canada. Terrified that the Soviets had discovered his duplicity, Gouzenko went back to his apartment at 511 Somerset Street West and hid with his family in the apartment across the hall for the night. Shortly before midnight, four men from the Soviet Embassy (Pavlov, Rogov, Angelov and Farafontov) broke into an apartment on Somerset Street looking for Gouzenko and his documents. The Ottawa Police quickly arrived, followed by the RCMP and officials from the Canadian Department of External Affairs.

The following day, September 7, Gouzenko was able to find contacts in the RCMP who were willing to examine the documents he had removed from the Soviet embassy. Gouzenko was transported by the RCMP to the secret World War II "Camp X", comfortably distant from Ottawa. While there, Gouzenko was interviewed by investigators from Britain's internal security service, MI5 (rather than MI6, as Canada was within the British Commonwealth) and by investigators from the U.S. Federal Bureau of Investigation.

Although the RCMP expressed interest in Gouzenko, Prime Minister of Canada William Lyon Mackenzie King initially wanted nothing to do with him. Even with Gouzenko in hiding and under RCMP protection, King reportedly pushed for a diplomatic solution to avoid upsetting the Soviet Union, still a wartime ally and ostensible friend. Documents reveal that King, then 70 and weary from six years of war leadership, was aghast when Norman Robertson, his undersecretary for external affairs, and his assistant, H.H. Wrong, informed him on the morning of September 6, 1945, that a "terrible thing" had happened. Gouzenko and his wife Svetlana, they told him, had appeared at the office of Justice Minister Louis St. Laurent with documents unmasking Soviet perfidy on Canadian soil. "It was like a bomb on top of everything else", King wrote. King's diaries assembled after his death were missing a single volume for November 10 to December 31, 1945, according to Library and Archives Canada.

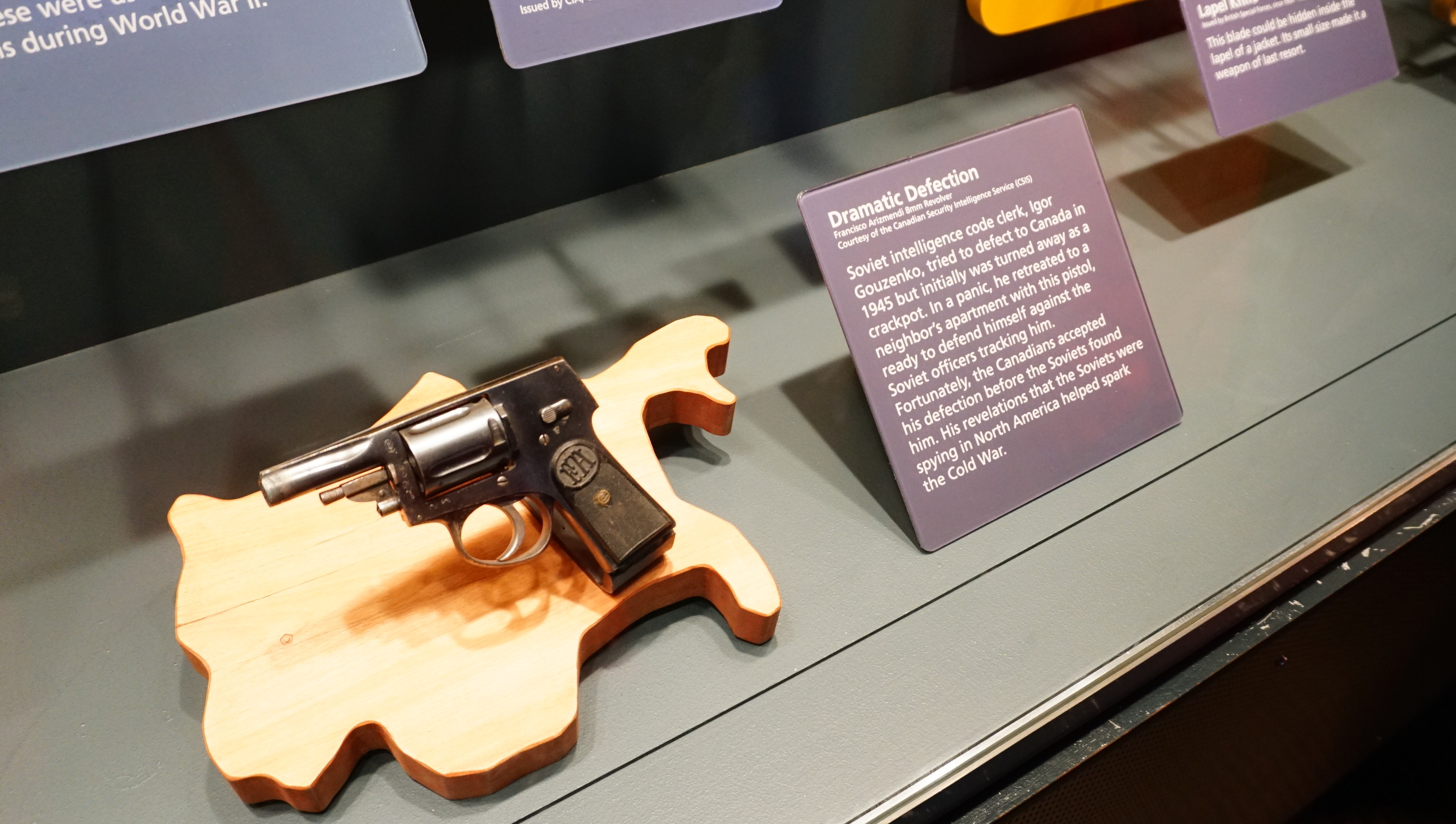
Igor Gouzenko's pistol, which he was carrying when hiding in his neighbour's apartment (exhibit of the International Spy Museum in Washington, DC)

Robertson told the Prime Minister that Gouzenko was threatening suicide, but King was adamant that his government not get involved, even if Gouzenko was apprehended by Soviet authorities. Robertson ignored King's wishes and authorized the granting of asylum to Gouzenko and his family, on the basis that their lives were in danger.

== Ramifications of the defection ==
In February 1946, news spread that a network of Canadian spies under control of the Soviet Union had been passing classified information to the Soviet government. Much of the information taken then is public knowledge now, and the Canadian government was less concerned with the information stolen, but more of the potential of real secrets coming into the hands of future enemies.

Canada played an important part in the early research with nuclear bomb technology, being part of the wartime Manhattan Project along with the US and UK. That kind of vital information could be dangerous to Canadian interests in the hands of other nations.

According to Canadian Security Intelligence Service director Reid Morden, Gouzenko's defection "ushered in the modern era of Canadian security intelligence".

The evidence provided by Gouzenko led to the arrest of a number of suspects, including Agatha Chapman, whose apartment at 282 Somerset Street West was a favourite evening rendezvous. Among those convicted were Fred Rose, who was the only Communist Member of Parliament in the Canadian House of Commons; Sam Carr, the Communist Party's national organizer; and scientist Raymond Boyer.

Chapman was later acquitted; the judge in her case announced that "No case has been made out and, as far as this trial is concerned, the accused is dismissed."

A Royal Commission of Inquiry to investigate espionage, headed by Justices Robert Taschereau and Roy Kellock, was conducted into the Gouzenko Affair and his evidence of a Soviet spy ring in Canada. It also alerted other countries around the world, such as the United States and the United Kingdom, that Soviet agents had almost certainly infiltrated their nations as well.

Gouzenko provided many vital leads which assisted greatly with ongoing espionage investigations in Britain and North America. The documents he handed over exposed numerous Canadians who were spying for the Soviet Union. A clerk at External Affairs, a Canadian Army captain, and a radar engineer working at the National Research Council were arrested for espionage. A spy ring of up to 20 people passing information to the Soviets led by Fred Rose was also exposed. In the United Kingdom, British nuclear scientist Alan Nunn May was arrested in March 1946 after being implicated in Gouzenko's documents. In the United States the FBI tracked down a Soviet spy, Ignacy Witczak, at the University of Southern California (USC) in Los Angeles.

Gouzenko's mother died in the NKVD prison at Lubyanka under investigation. Gouzenko always assumed that his sister Irina, who worked as an architect, also died as a result of his defection. However, according to 1956 records, she married and lived in Chelyabinsk. His brother, Vsevolod, who Igor believed had been lost in the war, was also in this city. Svetlana Gouzenko's father, mother, and sister each received five years in prison. The sister's daughter, Tatiana, was sent to an orphanage.

== Life in Canada ==
Gouzenko, with a pillow case over his head in 1954

Gouzenko and his family were given another identity by the Canadian government out of fear of Soviet reprisals. Gouzenko, as assigned by the Canadian government, lived the rest of his life under the assumed name of George Brown. Little is known about his life afterwards, but it is understood that he and his wife settled down to a middle-class existence in the Mississauga suburb of Port Credit. They raised eight children together. His children thought the language their parents spoke at home was Czech and supported Czechoslovakia in hockey games. They eventually learned the truth about their family's history from their parents at the age of 16–18.

Gouzenko was involved in a defamation case against Maclean's for a libellous article written about him. The case was heard by the Supreme Court of Canada.

He remained in the public eye, writing two books, This Was My Choice, a non-fiction account of his defection, and the novel The Fall of a Titan, which won a Governor General's Award in 1954. In 1955 professor Eugene Hudson Long and writer Gerald Warner Brace nominated the novel for the Nobel Prize in Literature. Gouzenko also painted and sold paintings. Gouzenko also appeared on television to promote his books and air grievances with the RCMP, always with a hood over his head.

== Death ==
Gouzenko died of a heart attack in 1982 in Mississauga. Svetlana died in September 2001, and she was buried next to him. His grave was unmarked until 2002 when family members erected a headstone.

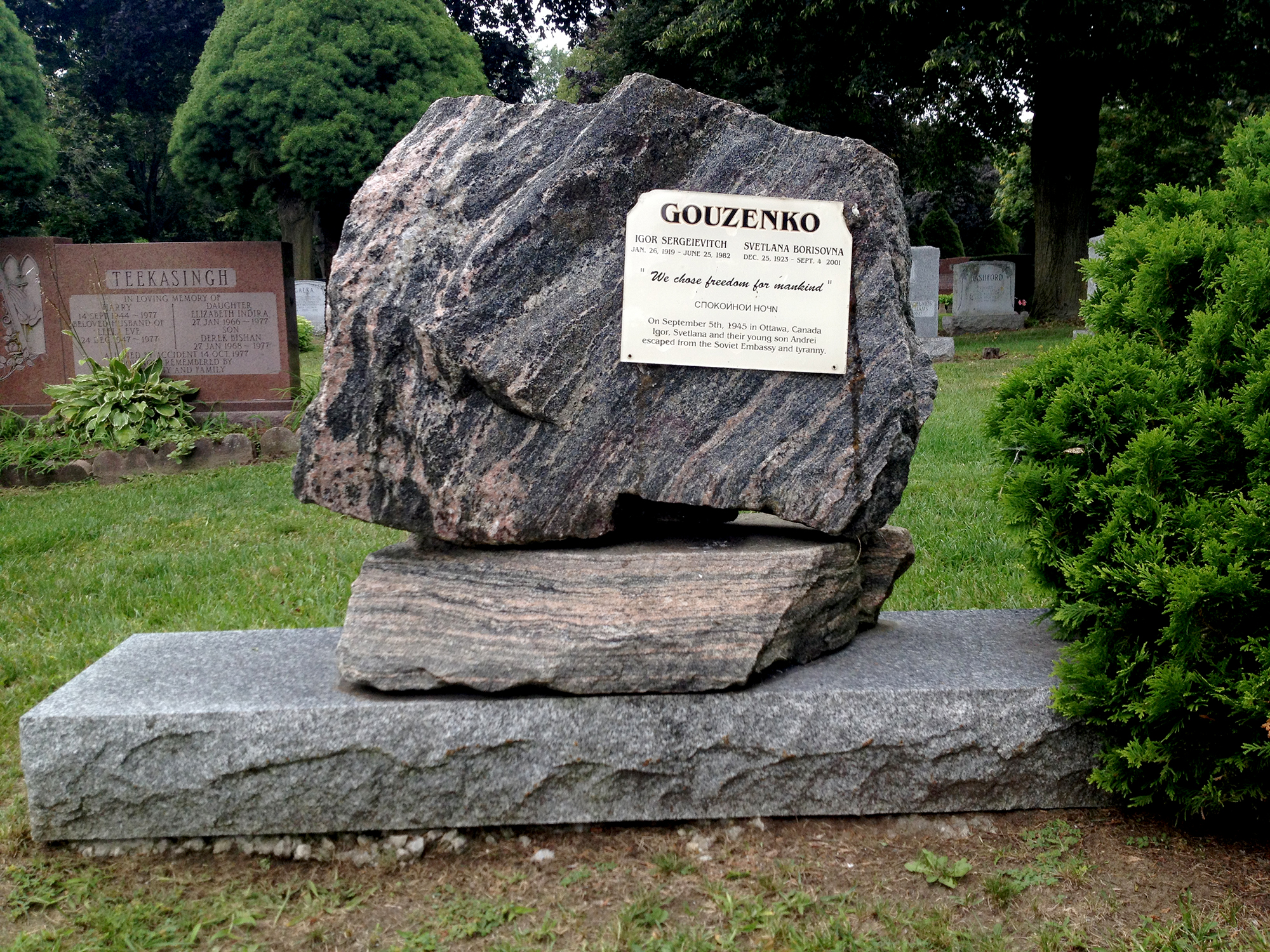
Igor Gouzenko's tombstone at Spring Creek Cemetery in Mississauga, Ontario, Canada

In 2002 federal Heritage Minister Sheila Copps designated "The Gouzenko Affair (1945–46)" an event of national historic significance. In June 2003, the city of Ottawa and in April 2004, the Canadian federal government put up memorial plaques in Dundonald Park commemorating the Soviet defector. It was from this park that Ottawa police and RCMP agents monitored Gouzenko's apartment across Somerset Street the night men from the Soviet embassy came looking for Gouzenko. The story of the process of lobbying the two levels of government to unveil the historic plaques is told in the book Remembering Gouzenko: The Struggle to Honour a Cold War Hero by Andrew Kavchak (2019).

== Film ==
The story of the Gouzenko Affair was made into the film The Iron Curtain in 1948, directed by William Wellman, with screenplay by Milton Krims, and starring Dana Andrews and Gene Tierney as Igor and Anna Gouzenko, produced by Twentieth Century Fox. The film's release was accompanied by criticism from the USSR. On February 21, 1948, the propaganda newspaper Culture and Life published a critical article by Ilya Ehrenburg.

Another film version of the Gouzenko Affair was made as Operation Manhunt in 1954, directed by Jack Alexander, with screenplay by Paul Monash, and starring Harry Townes and Irja Jensen, released by United Artists.

== Theatre ==
Theatre Passe Muraille in Toronto produced Head in a Bag, a Cold War Comedy in December 1992. The play was written and directed by Baņuta Rubess, who also played Gouzenko. "Rubess, effectively abetted by Oliver Dennis's fumbling performance in the lead role, portrays Gouzenko as a hapless bungler who barely succeeds in rifling the telltale documents," Toronto Star theatre critic Vit Wagner wrote in a review of the production.

== Works ==
- Non-Fiction
  - This was my choice (1948)
  - The iron curtain (1948)
- Fiction
  - The fall of a titan (1954)

== See also ==
- Kellock–Taschereau Commission
- List of Eastern Bloc defectors
- List of KGB defectors
- Sir William Stephenson

== Books ==
- "The Defection of Igor Gouzenko: Report of the Canadian Royal Commission" (Intelligence Series, Vol. 3, No. 6), Aegean Park, 1996. ISBN 0-89412-096-4.
- Amy Knight, How the Cold War Began: The Igor Gouzenko Affair and the Hunt for Soviet Spies, Carroll & Graf, 2006. ISBN 0-7867-1816-1.
- J.L. Black & Martin Rudner, eds., The Gouzenko Affair, Penumbra Press, 2006. ISBN 1-894131-91-6.
- Sawatsky, John, Gouzenko: the untold story, Gage Publishing Ltd., 1984. ISBN 0-7715-9812-2.
- Granatstein, J.L. & Stafford, David, Spy Wars, Key Porter Books Ltd., 1990. ISBN 1-55013-258-X.
- Stevenson, William, Intrepid's Last Case
- Gouzenko, Igor, This was My Choice, Eyre & Spottiswoode, London, 1948.
- Sawatsky, John, Men in the Shadows, Totem Books,1983. ISBN 0-00-216821-9.
- Pickersgill, J.W. & Forster, O.F., eds., The Mackenzie King Record. Toronto: The University of Toronto Press, 1970, Volume III.
- Clément, Dominique, Canada's Rights Revolution, Vancouver: UBC Press, 2008.
- Kavchak, Andrew, Remembering Gouzenko: The Struggle to Honour a Cold War Hero, 2019.
- Whitaker, Reginald (1994). Cold War Canada: The Making of a National Insecurity State, 1945–1957. University of Toronto Press. ISBN 978-0-8020-7950-3.

=== Further reading ===
A chapter on Igor Gouzenko

- Mike Gruntman (2010). "1". Enemy amongst Trojans: a Soviet spy at USC. Figueroa Press. pp. 1–10. ISBN 978-1-932800-74-6.
- Ken Cuthbertson (2020). "1". 1945: The Year That Made Modern Canada. HarperCollins Canada. pp. 311–339. ISBN 978-1-4434-5934-1.
