= Alain Giguère =

Canadian politician

Member of Parliament for Marc-Aurèle-Fortin
- In office May 2, 2011 – August 4, 2015
- Preceded by: Serge Ménard
- Succeeded by: Yves Robillard

Personal details
- Born: October 24, 1958 (age 67) Lachine, Quebec
- Party: New Democratic Party
- Profession: Tax lawyer

Alain Giguère (born October 24, 1958) is a Canadian politician who was elected to the House of Commons of Canada in the 2011 election. He represented the electoral district of Marc-Aurèle-Fortin as a member of the New Democratic Party. In the 2015 election he ran in Thérèse-De Blainville, but lost to Liberal Ramez Ayoub.

Before to being elected, Giguère was a tax lawyer. He has a bachelor's degree in political science, a bachelor's degree in legal science, and a certificate in social justice.

Before finally being elected in 2011, Giguère had run unsuccessfully in seven previous federal elections, in Verdun—Saint-Paul in 1984, in Roberval in 1993, 1997 and 2000, in Laval in 2004 and 2008, and in Laval—Les Îles in 2006, as well as provincially once for the New Democratic Party of Quebec in Saint-Henri in 1985.

In 2012, it was reported that he would give back the Queen Elizabeth II Diamond Jubilee Medal. All serving MPs that year were recipients.

== Electoral record ==
2011 Canadian federal election: Marc-Aurèle-Fortin
| Party | Candidate | Votes | % | ±% |
|---|---|---|---|---|
| New Democratic | Alain Giguère | 29,107 | 49.68 | +37.38 |
| Bloc Québécois | Marie-France Charbonneau | 15,470 | 26.40 | -19.12 |
| Liberal | Eduardo Gonzalo Agurto Catalán | 7,035 | 12.01 | -12.45 |
| Conservative | Johanne Théorêt | 5,768 | 9.85 | -3.97 |
| Green | Charles Sicotte | 1,208 | 2.06 | -1.82 |
| Total valid votes | | 58,588 | 98.73 | -0.11 |
| Total rejected ballots | | 751 | 1.27 | +0.11 |
| Turnout | | 59,339 | 67.74 | +0.33 |

2008 Canadian federal election: Laval
| Party | Candidate | Votes | % | ±% | Expenditures |
|---|---|---|---|---|---|
| Bloc Québécois | Nicole Demers | 19,085 | 37.79 | -6.6 | $68,964 |
| Liberal | Alia Haddad | 14,190 | 28.10 | +2.5 | $19,244 |
| Conservative | Jean-Pierre Bélisle | 9,101 | 18.02 | -0.6 | $73,966 |
| New Democratic | Alain Giguère | 6,289 | 12.45 | +4.3 | $1,831 |
| Green | Eric Madelein | 1,607 | 3.18 | -0.2 | |
| Marxist–Leninist | Yvon Breton | 221 | 0.43 | – | |
| Total valid votes/Expense limit | | 50,493 | 98.50 | – | $86,875 |
| Total rejected ballots | | 769 | 1.50 | | |
| Turnout | | 51,262 | 62.24 | | |

2006 Canadian federal election: Laval—Les Îles
| Party | Candidate | Votes | % | ±% | Expenditures |
|---|---|---|---|---|---|
| Liberal | Raymonde Folco | 20,849 | 39.31 | -8.55 | $53,323 |
| Bloc Québécois | Christiane Pichette | 17,537 | 33.07 | -4.04 | $51,106 |
| Conservative | Qais Hamidi | 9,055 | 17.07 | +10.09 | $24,108 |
| New Democratic | Alain Giguère | 3,817 | 7.19 | +2.80 | $1,122 |
| Green | Theodore Kouretas | 1,557 | 2.93 | +0.58 | $0 |
| Marxist–Leninist | Polyvios Tsakanikas | 211 | 0.39 | +0.08 | |
| Total | | 53,524 | 100.00 | – | $82,901 |
| Total rejected ballots | | 709 | 1.31 | | |
| Turnout | | 54,133 | 63.47 | | |

2004 Canadian federal election: Laval
| Party | Candidate | Votes | % | ±% | Expenditures |
|---|---|---|---|---|---|
| Bloc Québécois | Nicole Demers | 24,425 | 50.1 | – | $61,946 |
| Liberal | Pierre Lafleur | 17,639 | 36.2 | – | $67,777 |
| Conservative | Stéphane D'Amours | 3,115 | 6.4 | – | $12,823 |
| New Democratic | Alain Giguère | 1,998 | 4.1 | – | $221 |
| Green | Damien Pichereau | 1,091 | 2.2 | – | |
| Marijuana | Pierre Losier-Côté | 492 | 1.0 | – | |
| Total valid votes/Expense limit | | 48,760 | 100.0 | – | $79,622 |

2000 Canadian federal election
| Party | Candidate | Votes | % | ±% |
|---|---|---|---|---|
| Bloc Québécois | Michel Gauthier | 16,928 | 55.1 | +3.0 |
| Liberal | Jean-Pierre Boivin | 10,680 | 34.7 | +8.5 |
| Alliance | Raymond A. Brideau | 1,829 | 5.9 | |
| Progressive Conservative | Marie-Christine Huot | 870 | 2.8 | -17.5 |
| New Democratic | Alain Giguère | 437 | 1.4 | +0.1 |
| Total valid votes | | 30,744 | 100.0 | |

1997 Canadian federal election
| Party | Candidate | Votes | % | ±% |
|---|---|---|---|---|
| Bloc Québécois | Michel Gauthier | 16,207 | 52.1 | -7.6 |
| Liberal | Jean-Pierre Boivin | 8,176 | 26.3 | +5.9 |
| Progressive Conservative | France Tanguay | 6,312 | 20.3 | +2.0 |
| New Democratic | Alain Giguère | 412 | 1.3 | -0.2 |
| Total valid votes | | 31,107 | 100.0 | |

1993 Canadian federal election
| Party | Candidate | Votes | % | ±% |
|---|---|---|---|---|
| Bloc Québécois | Michel Gauthier | 18,869 | 59.7 | |
| Liberal | Aurélien Gill | 6,443 | 20.4 | +8.3 |
| Progressive Conservative | Henri-Paul Brassard | 5,793 | 18.3 | -58.0 |
| New Democratic | Alain Giguère | 485 | 1.5 | -8.0 |
| Total valid votes | | 31,590 | 100.0 | |

1985 Quebec general election: Saint-Henri
| Party | Candidate | Votes |
|---|---|---|
| Liberal | Roma Hains | 14,647 |
| Parti Québécois | Francine Lalonde | 9,911 |
| New Democratic | Alain Giguère | 602 |
| Parti indépendantiste | Gilles Rheaume | 456 |
| Parti humaniste du Québec | Roger Gingras | 151 |
| Parti du socialisme chrétien | Raymond St-Georges | 53 |

1984 Canadian federal election: Verdun—Saint-Paul
| Party | Candidate | Votes |
|---|---|---|
| Progressive Conservative | Gilbert Chartrand | 17,378 |
| Liberal | Pierre Savard | 16,431 |
| New Democratic | Alain Giguère | 3,912 |
| Rhinoceros | Philippe Hooligan Coté | 1,309 |
| Parti nationaliste | Serge Paquette | 798 |
| Commonwealth of Canada | Steve Boyle | 99 |

== See also ==
- Politics of Canada
- Elections in Canada
