= Joseph-Édouard-Émile Léonard =

Canadian politician

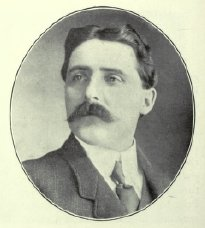

Member of the Canadian Parliament for Laval
- In office 1902–1908
- Preceded by: Thomas Fortin
- Succeeded by: Charles-Avila Wilson

Personal details
- Born: 11 December 1872 Ste-Rose, Laval County, Quebec
- Died: 15 September 1933 (aged 60)
- Party: Conservative

Joseph-Édouard-Émile Léonard (11 December 1872 – 15 September 1933) was a Canadian lawyer and politician.

Born in Ste-Rose, Laval County, Quebec, Léonard was educated at the Colleges of Ste Therese, Joliette and St. Mary's in Montreal. A lawyer, he was head of the Montreal firm of Leonard & Patenaude. He was the Conservative candidate in the electoral district of Laval in the general elections of 1900 but was defeated by Thomas Fortin. He was first elected to the House of Commons of Canada in a 1902 by-election, after Fortin was appointed Judge of the Superior Court of Quebec, Montreal District. He was re-elected in 1904 and was defeated in 1908 and again in 1911.
