= Joseph-Aldric Ouimet =

Canadian politician (1848–1916)

The Honourable Joseph-Aldric Ouimet PC
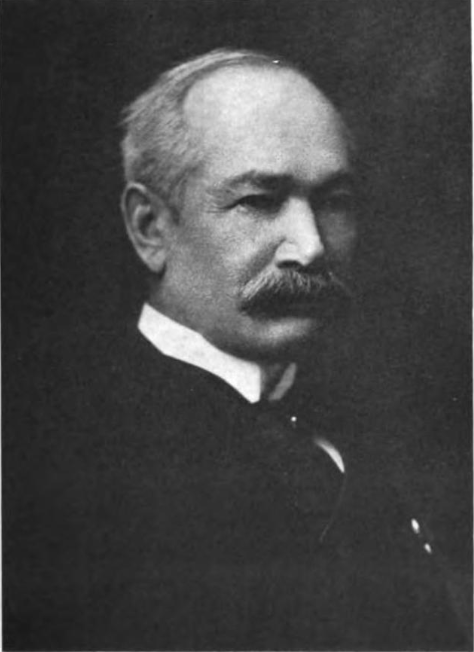
- Ouimet in January 1914

5th Speaker of the House of Commons
- In office July 13, 1887 – July 28, 1891
- Preceded by: George Airey Kirkpatrick
- Succeeded by: Peter White

Member of the Canadian Parliament for Laval
- In office 1873–1896
- Preceded by: Joseph-Hyacinthe Bellerose
- Succeeded by: Thomas Fortin

Personal details
- Born: May 21, 1847 Sainte-Rose, Canada East
- Died: May 12, 1916 (aged 68)
- Party: Liberal-Conservative
- Occupation: Lawyer

Joseph-Aldric Ouimet PC (baptized Aldric; May 20, 1848 – May 12, 1916) was a Canadian politician.

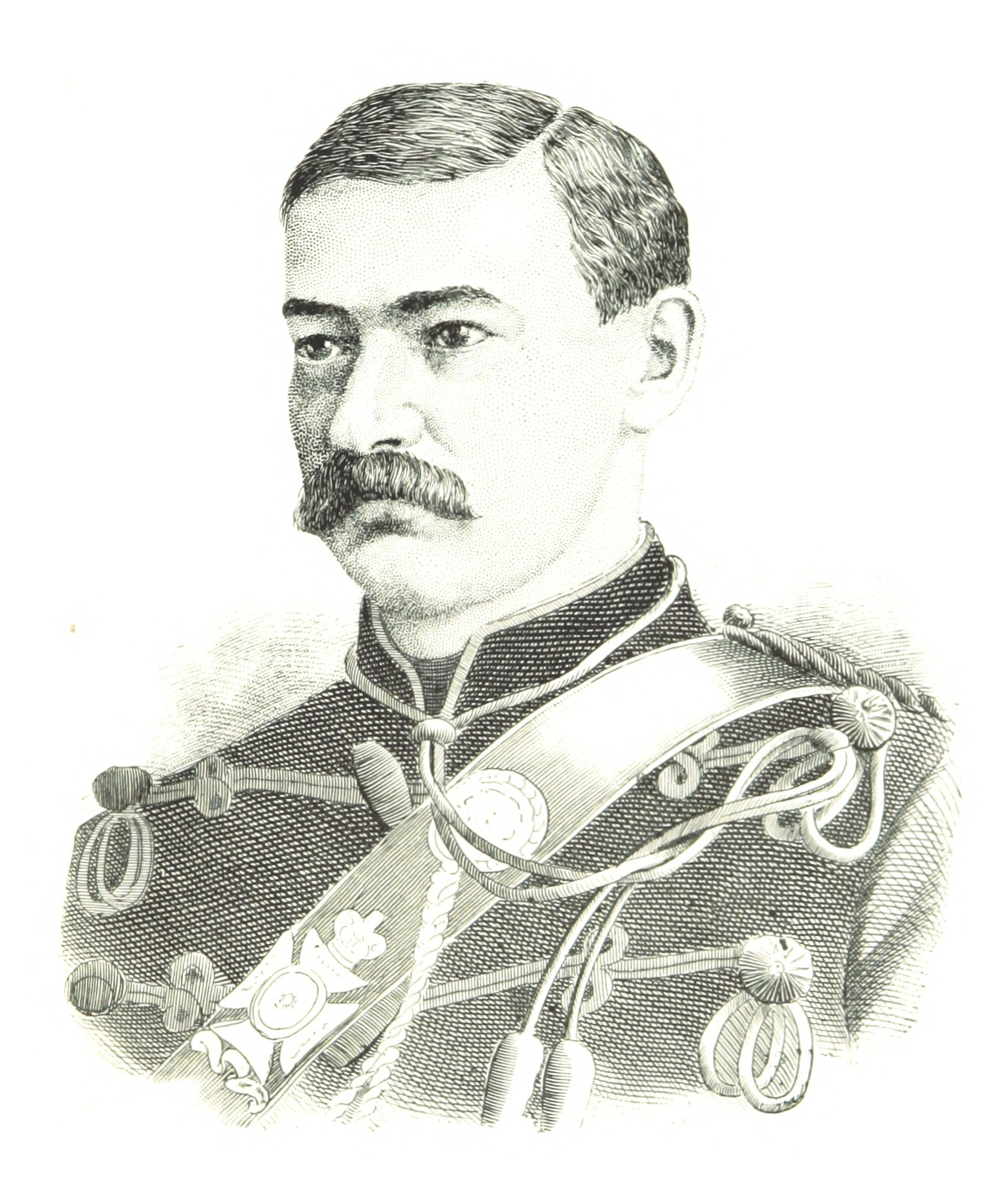
Ouimet as a Lieutenant-Colonel

== Biography ==
Ouimet was first elected to the House of Commons in an 1873 by-election as member of Parliament for Laval, Quebec. He was a Liberal-Conservative and supporter of the government of Sir John A. Macdonald.

After being educated in a seminary, and a brief career as a journalist, Ouimet became a lawyer. He was first elected to the House of Commons at the age of 25. His advocacy of the rights of French Canadians was challenged by the Conservative government's attitude to Louis Riel. Following the First Riel Rebellion, Ouimet argued for Riel to be pardoned, and, in 1875, voted against a Conservative motion to expel Riel from the seat in the House of Commons to which he had been elected.

With the beginning of the Second Riel Rebellion in 1885, Minister of Militia Adolphe Caron asked Ouimet to raise a regiment from Montreal to join in the suppression of the uprising. Ouimet raised three hundred men, and led his regiment as its Lieutenant-Colonel. He was put under the command of Thomas Bland Strange who rejected Ouimet's proposal to negotiate safe passage for Riel.

Strange sent Ouimet to Ottawa to secure supplies resulting in newspapers accusing him of desertion. He returned west and was placed in command of Fort Edmonton.

Despite fighting against the rebels, Ouimet opposed the execution of Riel when he returned to Ottawa. Ouimet's pleas fell on deaf ears, and, despite his efforts, he was condemned by French Canadians for having helped put down the rebellion.

Ouimet voted in the House of Commons for a Liberal motion to censure the government for executing Riel.

The execution of Riel seriously damaged the Conservative Party in Quebec, and was one of the key factors in the party's decline and eventual loss of power. In an attempt at conciliation, Prime Minister Macdonald nominated Ouimet for the position of speaker of the House of Commons following the 1887 election.

Because of the custom of alternating between English and French Speakers following each general election, Ouimet returned to the backbench following the 1891 election. Macdonald died in June 1891, and his longtime Quebec lieutenant, Sir Hector Langevin, was forced to resign from Cabinet due to a corruption scandal in August. In January 1892, Prime Minister Sir John Abbott made Ouimet the senior minister from Quebec, and appointed him to Langevin's old job as Minister of Public Works. Ouimet stayed in that position under the succession of Prime Ministers who attempted to keep the Conservative government together. He also served as Acting Minister of Agriculture and Acting Secretary of State for Canada under Sir Mackenzie Bowell. Bowell faced a caucus revolt over his handling of the Manitoba Schools Question and was forced to resign. The issue split the party as English Protestant Conservatives rejected Bowell's proposal to create a new Catholic School Board in Manitoba.

With the fall of Bowell's cabinet, the opposition of Tory MPs to French Catholic rights in Manitoba further hurt the party's prospects among Catholic Quebecers. Perhaps sensing that the Conservative government was doomed and that his prospects of keeping his seat were dim as Quebecers turned against the Tories, Ouimet decided not to run in the 1896 election. He declined to serve in the short-lived Cabinet of the Sir Charles Tupper, the final Tory prime minister prior to the election. He instead accepted a judicial appointment that he held until his death in 1916.

== Legacy ==
He holds the current record for being acclaimed to parliament 5 times.

Ouimet Canyon near Thunder Bay in north-western Ontario is named for him.
