= Jean-Léo Rochon =

Canadian politician

- Official 1968 portrait

Member of the Legislative Assembly of Quebec for Deux-Montagnes
- In office 1935–1936
- Preceded by: Paul Sauvé
- Succeeded by: Paul Sauvé

Member of the Canadian Parliament for Laval
- In office June 1962 – June 1968
- Preceded by: Rodrigue Bourdages
- Succeeded by: Marcel-Claude Roy

Member of Parliament for Ahuntsic
- In office June 1968 – September 1972
- Succeeded by: Jeanne Sauvé

Personal details
- Born: 3 July 1902 Saint-Augustin, Mirabel, Quebec, Canada
- Died: 21 June 1988 (aged 85) Montreal, Quebec, Canada
- Party: Liberal
- Spouse: Cécile Lalande (m. 1950)
- Profession: optometrist

Jean-Léo Rochon (French pronunciation: [ʒɑ̃ leo ʁɔʃɔ̃]; 3 July 1902 – 21 June 1988) was a Liberal party member of the House of Commons of Canada. He was born in Saint-Augustin, now a part of Mirabel and became an optometrist by career.

He was first elected in the 1935 Quebec general election as a Liberal party member of the short-lived 19th Legislative Assembly of Quebec from November 1935 to August 1936, but only served that one term as a provincial politician.

After several provincial and federal election defeats, Rochon won a House of Commons seat at the Laval riding in the 1962 general election. He was re-elected there in the 1963 and 1965 federal elections. For the 1968 federal election, Rochon was re-elected at the Ahuntsic electoral district. He served his final term in the 28th Canadian Parliament then left federal office in 1972 without campaigning for another term in the House of Commons.

1965 Canadian federal election: Laval
Party	Candidate	Votes	%	±%
Liberal	Jean-Léo Rochon	44,533	50.7	-3.3
New Democratic	Louis-Philippe Lecours	21,484	24.4	+9.0
Progressive Conservative	Rudy Hébert	13,553	15.4	+1.8
Ralliement créditiste	Jean-Charles Brouillard	8,349	9.5	-7.5
Total valid votes		87,919	100.0	

Note: Ralliement créditiste vote is compared to Social Credit vote in the 1963 election.

1963 Canadian federal election: Laval
Party	Candidate	Votes	%	±%
Liberal	Jean-Léo Rochon	43,452	53.9	+4.4
Social Credit	Roland Reeves	13,701	17.0	+11.1
New Democratic	Louis-Philippe Lecours	12,478	15.5	+8.2
Progressive Conservative	Georges Long	10,963	13.6	-17.6
Total valid votes		80,594	100.0	

1962 Canadian federal election: Laval
Party	Candidate	Votes	%	±%
Liberal	Jean-Léo Rochon	36,248	49.5	+3.3
Progressive Conservative	J.-Rodrigue Bourdages	22,843	31.2	-16.3
New Democratic	Louis-Ph. Lecours	5,302	7.2	+3.3
Independent Liberal	Adrien Bonin	4,513	6.2	
Social Credit	Léopold Mercier	4,294	5.9	
Total valid votes		73,200	100.0	
