= Eva Nassif =

Canadian politician and translator

Member of Parliament for Vimy
- In office October 19, 2015 – September 11, 2019
- Preceded by: District created
- Succeeded by: Annie Koutrakis

Personal details
- Born: Ain el Dilb, South Lebanon, Lebanon
- Party: Conservative (since 2024)
- Other political affiliations: Liberal (until 2024)
- Spouse: Georges Abi Saad
- Children: Charbel; Maroun; Josée
- Education: Concordia University
- Profession: Politician, Translator
- Committees: Pay Equity; Library of Parliament; Status of Women
- Website: www.traducteva.com

Eva Nassif (in Arabic إيفا ناصيف) is a Canadian politician and translator, who served as the Member of Parliament for the riding of Vimy in the House of Commons of Canada from 2015 to 2019 as a member of the Liberal Party of Canada.

== Background and education ==
Born in Ain el Dilb, South Lebanon, Lebanon, Nassif got her diploma in nursing in Lebanon and worked as a registered nurse for five years in the American University Hospital (AUH) in Beirut before arriving in Canada.

After immigrating to Canada in 1993, she obtained a Bachelor of Arts degree in translation and a Master of Arts in translation studies from Concordia University. The subject of her master's dissertation was "the terminology of proteomics". She became a certified translator and terminologist. She also worked as a teacher for the Laval School Board.

== Federal politics ==
Nassif ran as the Liberal candidate for the riding of Laval in the 2011 federal election and placed third.

In the 2015 federal election, she again ran as a Liberal candidate, this time for the new riding of Vimy and won by a substantial margin.

In August 2019, the Liberal riding president for Vimy claimed that the Liberal Party prevented Nassif from earning the party's nomination for the 2019 federal election. Nassif claimed she was not nominated to run because she did not publicly support Trudeau as a feminist following the SNC-Lavalin affair. Following the dispute, the riding association refused to transfer campaign funds to the new candidate, Annie Koutrakis.

On December 13, 2024, at a rally in Montreal, she endorsed Conservative leader Pierre Poilievre.

== Personal life ==
Nassif is married to a PhD engineer, Georges Abi-Saad, and is the mother of triplets Charbel, Maroun, and Josée.

Nassif has dual citizenship in Canada and her native Lebanon.

== Electoral record ==
2015 Canadian federal election: Vimy
Party	Candidate	Votes	%	±%	Expenditures
Liberal	Eva Nassif	25,082	46.15	+25.8	–
New Democratic	France Duhamel	11,391	20.96	-21.74	–
Bloc Québécois	Barek Kaddouri	9,068	16.69	-5.05	–
Conservative	Anthony Mavros	7,262	13.36	+0.59	–
Green	José Núñez-Melo	1,280	2.36	+0.43	–
Christian Heritage	Brian Jenkins	260	0.48	–	–
Total valid votes/Expense limit		54,343	100.0		$224,281.29
Total rejected ballots		941	1.70	–	
Turnout		55,284	64.36	–	
Eligible voters		85,889			
Liberal gain from New Democratic		Swing		+23.77	
Source: Elections Canada

2011 Canadian federal election: Laval
Party	Candidate	Votes	%	±%	Expenditures
New Democratic	José Núñez-Melo	22,050	43.33	+30.88	
Bloc Québécois	Nicole Demers	11,567	22.73	-15.06	
Liberal	Eva Nassif	9,422	18.51	-9.59	
Conservative	Robert Malo	6,366	12.33	-5.51	
Green	Jocelyne Leduc	1,260	2.48	-0.70	
Marxist–Leninist	Yvon Breton	224	0.44	+0.01	
Total valid votes/Expense limit		50,889	100.00		
Total rejected ballots		738	1.43	-0.07	
Turnout		51,627	60.74	-1.50	
Eligible voters		84,991			
New Democratic gain from Bloc Québécois		Swing		+22.97	
