= Marc-Aurèle-Fortin (electoral district) =

Federal electoral district in Quebec, Canada

Coordinates: 45.592°N 73.772°W

Quebec electoral district
- Interactive map of riding boundaries from the 2015 federal election

Federal electoral district
- Legislature: House of Commons
MP
Carlos Leitão
Liberal
- District created: 2004
- First contested: 2004
- Last contested: 2025
- District webpage: profile, map

Demographics
- Population (2016): 101,750
- Electors (2015): 78,371
- Area (km²): 54
- Pop. density (per km²): 1,884.3
- Census division: Laval
- Census subdivision: Laval

Sainte-Rose (electoral district) re-directs here. For the provincial electoral district, see Sainte-Rose (provincial electoral district)

Marc-Aurèle-Fortin (French pronunciation: [maʁk ɔʁɛl fɔʁtɛ̃]) is a federal electoral district in Quebec, Canada, that has been represented in the House of Commons of Canada since 2004.

== Geography ==
The district includes the neighbourhoods of Auteuil and Sainte-Rose, the eastern part of the neighbourhood of Fabreville, and the western part of neighbourhood of Vimont in the City of Laval. The neighbouring ridings are Rivière-des-Mille-Îles, Thérèse-De Blainville, Alfred-Pellan, Vimy, and Laval—Les Îles.

== History ==
The district was created in 2004 from Laval Centre, Terrebonne—Blainville, Laval East and Rivière-des-Milles-Îles ridings. It is named in honour of the artist Marc-Aurèle Fortin.

This riding was significantly changed during the 2012 electoral redistribution. It lost territory to Thérèse-De Blainville and Rivière-des-Mille-Îles, and gained territory from Laval, Laval—Les Îles and Alfred-Pellan making the riding entirely within the city of Laval.

=== Members of Parliament ===
This riding has elected the following members of Parliament:

Parliament	Years	Member	Party
Marc-Aurèle-Fortin; Riding created from Laval Centre, Terrebonne—Blainville, Laval East and Rivière-des-Mille-Îles
38th	2004–2006	Serge Ménard	Bloc Québécois
39th	2006–2008	Serge Ménard	Bloc Québécois
40th	2008–2011	Serge Ménard	Bloc Québécois
41st	2011–2015	Alain Giguère	New Democratic
42nd	2015–2019	Yves Robillard	Liberal
43rd	2019–2021	Yves Robillard	Liberal
44th	2021–2025	Yves Robillard	Liberal
45th	2025–present	Carlos Leitão	Liberal

== Election results ==
2025 Canadian federal election
Party	Candidate	Votes	%	±%	Expenditures
Liberal	Carlos Leitão	29,928	51.99	+7.88	$39,264.14
Bloc Québécois	Claude Tousignant	13,584	23.60	–7.20	$10,128.75
Conservative	Janina Moran	11,923	20.71	+8.97	$3,948.42
New Democratic	Alexandrah Cardona-Fortin	2,128	3.70	–4.86	$0.00
Total valid votes/expense limit		57,563	98.30	–	$129,304.10
Total rejected ballots		993	1.70		
Turnout		58,556	70.63		
Eligible voters		82,902			
Liberal hold		Swing		+7.54	
Source: Elections Canada
Note: number of eligible voters does not include voting day registrations.

2021 Canadian federal election
Party	Candidate	Votes	%	±%	Expenditures
Liberal	Yves Robillard	22,992	44.1	-0.5	$16,821.13
Bloc Québécois	Manon D. Lacharité	16,055	30.8	-1.6	$15,943.07
Conservative	Sarah Petrari	6,120	11.7	+2.0	$5,460.48
New Democratic	Ali Faour	4,461	8.6	+0.1	$51.08
People's	Louis Léger	1,509	2.9	+2.1	$474.48
Free	Micheline Flibotte	990	1.9	N/A	$2.00
Total valid votes/expense limit		52,127	98.2	–	$110,284.77
Total rejected ballots		946	1.8		
Turnout		53,073	67.3		
Eligible voters		78,910			
Liberal hold		Swing		+0.6	
Source: Elections Canada

2019 Canadian federal election
Party	Candidate	Votes	%	±%	Expenditures
Liberal	Yves Robillard	24,865	44.55	+3.53	$25,135.91
Bloc Québécois	Lizabel Nitoi	18,069	32.37	+10.65	$9,590.09
Conservative	Sonia Baudelot	5,423	9.72	-2.22	none listed
New Democratic	Ali Faour	4,741	8.49	-15.10	$9,355.12
Green	Bao Tran Le	2,111	3.78	+1.84	$0.00
People's	Emilio Migliozzi	465	0.83	n/a	none listed
Independent	Elias Progakis	143	0.26	n/a	
Total valid votes/expense limit		55,817	100.0		
Total rejected ballots		924	1.63%		
Turnout		56,741	72.40		
Eligible voters		78,371			
Liberal hold		Swing		-3.56	
Source: Elections Canada

2015 Canadian federal election
Party	Candidate	Votes	%	±%	Expenditures
Liberal	Yves Robillard	22,323	41.02	+27.17	$11,004.21
New Democratic	Marie-Josée Lemieux	12,827	23.59	-25.39	$54,504.31
Bloc Québécois	Patrice Jasmin-Tremblay	11,820	21.72	-2.55	$22,415.01
Conservative	Nicolas Makridis	6,498	11.94	+1.57	$3,236.86
Green	Lorna Mungur	1,057	1.94	-0.4	–
Total valid votes/expense limit		54,425	100.0		$209,180.83
Total rejected ballots		769	–	–	
Turnout		55,294	–	–	
Eligible voters		76,162			
Source: Elections Canada

2011 federal election redistributed results
Party	Vote	%
New Democratic	23,154	48.98
Bloc Québécois	11,471	24.27
Liberal	6,545	13.85
Conservative	4,904	10.37
Green	1,108	2.34
Others	90	0.19

2011 Canadian federal election
Party	Candidate	Votes	%	±%	Expenditures
New Democratic	Alain Giguère	29,107	49.68	+37.38	
Bloc Québécois	Marie-France Charbonneau	15,470	26.40	-19.12	
Liberal	Eduardo Gonzalo Agurto Catalán	7,035	12.01	-12.45	
Conservative	Johanne Théorêt	5,768	9.85	-3.97	
Green	Charles Sicotte	1,208	2.06	-1.82	
Total valid votes/expense limit		58,588	100.00		
Total rejected ballots		751	1.27	+0.11	
Turnout		59,339	67.74	+0.33	
Eligible voters		59,339	–	–	

2008 Canadian federal election
Party	Candidate	Votes	%	±%	Expenditures
Bloc Québécois	Serge Ménard	25,552	45.52	-5.5	$82,764
Liberal	Robert Frégeau	13,728	24.46	+8.9	$15,982
Conservative	Claude Moreau	7,759	13.82	-6.7	$43,446
New Democratic	Benoît Beauchamp	6,907	12.30	+4.3	$854
Green	Lise Bissonnette	2,178	3.88	-1.2	
Total valid votes/expense limit		56,124	100.0	$87,972	
Total rejected ballots		661	1.16		
Turnout		56,785	67.41		

2006 Canadian federal election
Party	Candidate	Votes	%	±%	Expenditures
Bloc Québécois	Serge Ménard	27,638	51.0	-7.9	$75,195
Conservative	Claude Moreau	11,098	20.5	+14.5	$8,106
Liberal	Renée Gagné	8,407	15.5	-12.2	$19,434
New Democratic	Martin Duplantis	4,313	8.0	+4.4	$1,328
Green	Lise Bissonnette	2,733	5.0	+1.2	
Total valid votes/expense limit		54,189	100.0	$80,381	

2004 Canadian federal election
Party	Candidate	Votes	%	±%	Expenditures
Bloc Québécois	Serge Ménard	30,779	58.9	–	$76,323
Liberal	Nancy Girard	14,491	27.7	–	$62,416
Conservative	Marc Bissonnette	3,125	6.0	–	$5,053
Green	Lise Bissonnette	2,012	3.8	–	$23
New Democratic	Lyse Généreux	1,867	3.6	–	$806
Total valid votes/expense limit		52,274	100.0	$78,363	

== See also ==
- List of Canadian electoral districts
- Historical federal electoral districts of Canada
