= Canadian Council on Learning =

The Canadian Council on Learning was a channel for lifelong learning, encouraging and supporting data-based decisions about learning during all stages of life, from early childhood through to the senior years. The organization received about 85% of its funding from the Government of Canada, which announced in January 2010, that it was not renewing its funding. The organization's website is no longer available.

== History ==
In late 2002, the Government of Canada proposed the creation of an institution that would "work with Canadians, provinces, sector councils, labour organizations and learning institutions to create the skills and learning architecture that Canada needs," including "building our knowledge and reporting to Canadians about what is working and what is not". In November 2002, at the National Summit of Innovation in Toronto, educational leaders from across Canada identified "lifelong learning" as a priority for Canada. It was then that CCL was announced as the "Canadian Learning Institute" (then changed to "Canadian Council on Learning")—an organization with the objective of linking all facets of lifelong learning to be funded by the Government of Canada.

== Functions ==
CCL reports frequently on the position and progress of learning in Canada. CCL provides advice on what is presently working and what areas need improvement. CCL provides evidence-informed information that allows Canadians to make knowledgeable decisions about learning of all kinds.

== Research material ==
CCL produces a wide variety of material to aid researchers and policy-makers working in the realm of Canadian education.

- Composite Learning Index (CLI): An Index used to develop links between learning conditions and economic and social outcomes in Canada.
- Annual Report on the State of Post-secondary Education in Canada: This annual report focuses on the state of post-secondary education (PSE) across Canada.
- Annual Report on the State of Learning in Canada (SOLR): An annual report that attempts to provide Canadians with information pertaining to learning throughout various stages of life.
- Redefining How Success Is Measured in First Nations, Inuit and Métis Learning: Developed in collaboration with various Aboriginal organizations, this report attempt to address the means by which Aboriginal learners are assessed.
- Reading the Future: Planning to meet Canada's future literacy needs: Forecasts the state of adult literacy in Canada using a statistical tool called Projecting Adult Literacy: Measuring Movement (PALMM).
- Health Literacy: In 2008, the CCL released Health Literacy: A Healthy Understanding: A report pertaining to the importance of literacy to the well-being of Canadians.
- Lessons in Learning: A series of articles pertaining to lifelong learning in Canada. Since 2005 the CCL produced more than 50 articles.

== See also ==
- Canadian Civil Liberties Education Trust
