= Dominique Clément =

Canadian historical sociologist

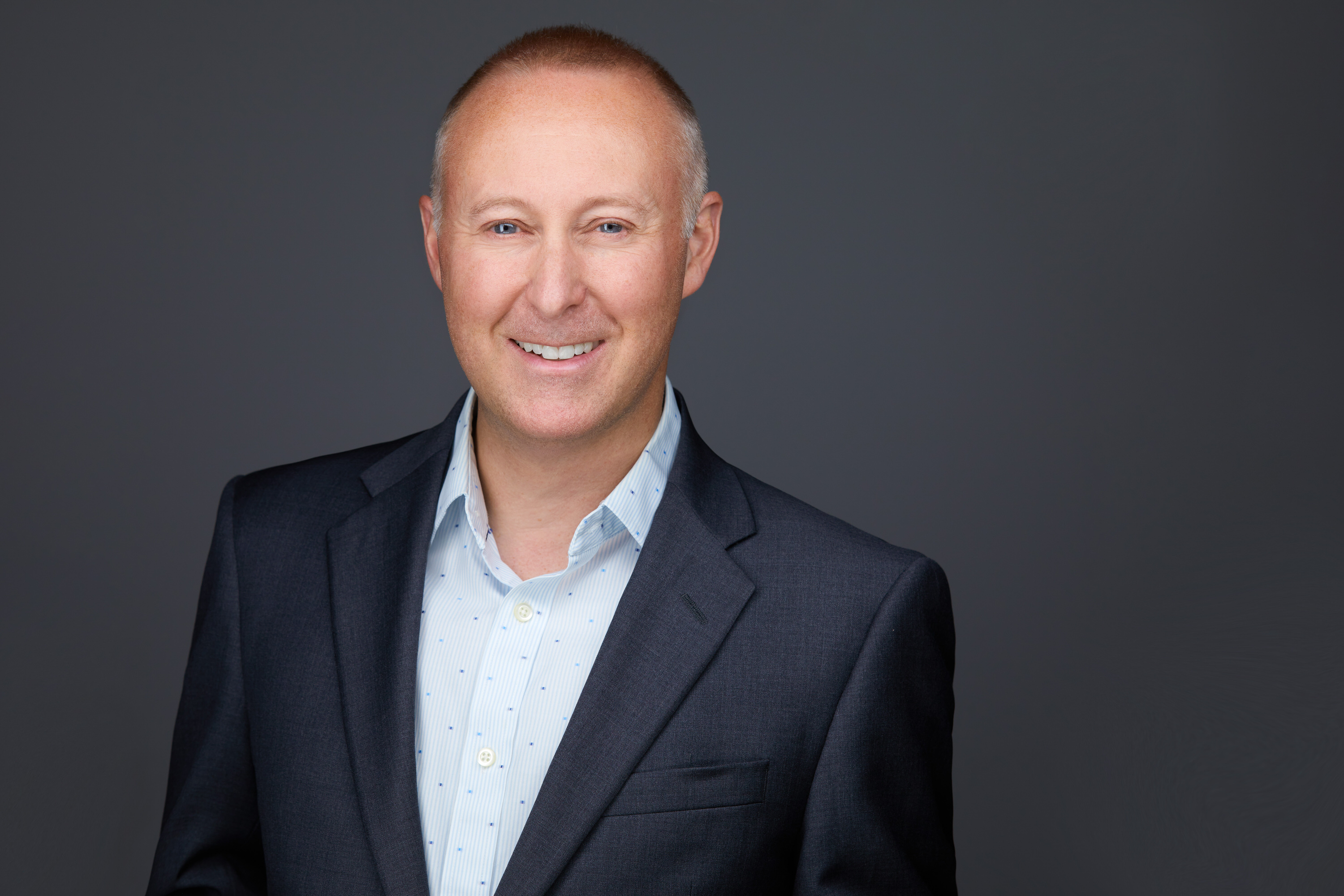
- Born: 1975 (age 50–51); Ottawa
- Occupation: Professor

Academic background
- Education: Queen's University; University of British Columbia; Memorial University of Newfoundland
- Thesis: Rights in the age of protest: a history of the human rights and civil liberties movement in Canada, 1962-1982 (2005)

Academic work
- Institutions: University of Alberta; University of Victoria; University of Sydney; KU Leuven; NUI, Galway
- Website: historyofrights.ca/about/

Dominique Clément (born 1975) is a Canadian historical sociologist. He is a Professor and Chair of the Department of Sociology at the University of Alberta. In 2018, he was named a member of the Royal Society of Canada's College of New Scholars, Artists and Scientists for his research into human rights (law and activism) and the nonprofit sector in Canada.

He is the former Managing Editor of the Canadian Review of Sociology and Associate Editor for the Journal of the Canadian Historical Association. He has served on the board of directors for the Canadian Sociological Association, Canadian Historical Association, Canadian Civil Liberties Association, British Columbia Civil Liberties Association, Canadian Committee on Women's and Gender History, John Humphrey Centre for Peace and Human Rights and the Centre for Constitutional Studies.

== Early life and education ==
Clément was born in 1975. He earned his PhD at Memorial University of Newfoundland. His dissertation was titled: "Rights in the age of protest: a history of the human rights and civil liberties movement in Canada, 1962-1982."

== Career ==
Clément has received distinctions for research (Killam Annual Professorship), community engagement (Angus Reid Applied Sociology Award; University of Alberta Community Engagement Award), and teaching (Undergraduate Teaching Award; Bill Meloff Award). In 2009, he received the John Porter Memorial Book Prize for his book Canada's Rights Revolution: Social Movements and Social Change, 1937-1982. In 2016, his book Equality Deferred: Sex Discrimination and British Columbia's Human Rights State, 1953-84 was a finalist for the Canada Prize in the Social Sciences. Equality Deferred also received the Clio Book Award by the Canadian Historical Association and was shortlisted for a book award by the Canadian Political Science. In recognition of his research into the history of social movements and human rights, Clément was elected to the Royal Society of Canada's College of New Scholars, Artists and Scientists in 2018.

== Publications ==
- Debating Rights Inflation in Canada: A Sociology of Human Rights (2018, Wilfrid Laurier University Press)
- Human Rights in Canada: A History (2016, Wilfrid Laurier University Press)
- Equality Deferred: Sex Discrimination and British Columbia's Human Rights State (2014, University of British Columbia Press)
- Canada's Rights Revolution: Social Movements and Social Change (2008, University of British Columbia Press). Translated and published by Akashi Press.
- Debating Dissent: Canada and the Sixties (2012, University of Toronto Press)
- Alberta's Human Rights Story (2012, John Humphrey Centre for Peace and Human Rights)
- People's Citizenship Guide: A Response to Conservative Canada edited by Adele Perry and Esyllt Jones (2012, ARP Books)
- The Academy as Community: A Manual of Best Practices for Meeting the Needs of New Scholars (2004, Federation for the Humanities and Social Sciences)
