= Rodrigue Bourdages =

Canadian politician and contractor

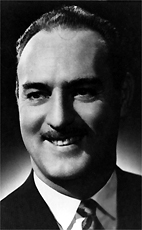

Member of the Canadian Parliament for Laval
- In office 1958–1962
- Preceded by: Léopold Demers
- Succeeded by: Jean-Léo Rochon

Personal details
- Born: 22 October 1923 Halifax, Nova Scotia, Canada
- Died: 12 October 1997 (aged 73)
- Party: Independent (1957-1958); Progressive Conservative Party (1958-)
- Occupation: contractor

Rodrigue Bourdages (22 October 1923 – 12 October 1997) was a Canadian politician and contractor. He was elected to the House of Commons of Canada as a Member of the Progressive Conservative Party in 1958 to represent the riding of Laval. He was defeated in the 1957 election as an independent candidate and as a PC candidate in 1962.

1962 Canadian federal election: Laval
Party	Candidate	Votes	%	±%
Liberal	Jean-Léo Rochon	36,248	49.5	+3.3
Progressive Conservative	J.-Rodrigue Bourdages	22,843	31.2	-16.3
New Democratic	Louis-Ph. Lecours	5,302	7.2	+3.3
Independent Liberal	Adrien Bonin	4,513	6.2	
Social Credit	Léopold Mercier	4,294	5.9	
Total valid votes		73,200	100.0	

1958 Canadian federal election: Laval
Party	Candidate	Votes	%	±%
Progressive Conservative	Rodrigue Bourdages	26,076	47.5	+34.8
Liberal	Léopold Demers	25,363	46.2	-14.4
Co-operative Commonwealth	Jacques Champagne	2,165	3.9	+1.2
Independent PC	Alexandre Joly	796	1.5	
Independent Liberal	Arthur Prévost	476	0.9	
Total valid votes		54,876	100.0	
