= Joseph-Hyacinthe Bellerose =

Canadian politician (1820–1899)

The Honourable Joseph-Hyacinthe Bellerose
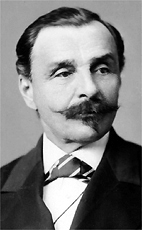

Member of the Canadian Parliament for Laval
- In office 1867–1873
- Succeeded by: Joseph-Aldric Ouimet

Member of the Legislative Assembly of Quebec for Laval
- In office 1867–1873
- Succeeded by: Joseph-Aldric Ouimet

Senator for De Lanaudière, Quebec
- In office 1873–1899
- Appointed by: John A. Macdonald
- Preceded by: Louis Auguste Olivier
- Succeeded by: Joseph Philippe Baby Casgrain

Personal details
- Born: July 12, 1820 Trois-Rivières, Lower Canada
- Died: August 13, 1899 (aged 79) Saint-Vincent-de-Paul (Laval), Quebec, Canada
- Party: Conservative

Joseph-Hyacinthe Bellerose (French pronunciation: [ʒozɛf jasɛ̃t bɛlʁoz]; July 12, 1820 – August 13, 1899) was a Canadian militiaman and politician. He served in the Legislative Assembly of the Province of Canada, the House of Commons of Canada, the Legislative Assembly of Quebec, the Senate of Canada and as the mayor of Saint-Vincent-de-Paul, Quebec.

== Early life ==
Joseph-Hyacinthe Bellerose was born on July 12, 1820, at Trois-Rivières to father Michel-Hyacinthe Bellerose, a merchant, and mother Geneviève-Sophie Lemaître. The young Joseph attended a local Trois-Rivières school until 1833, when he began attending Séminaire de Nicolet. Educated there until 1836 or 1837, Bellerose completed his classical education at Séminaire de Saint-Hyacinthe in 1842. He began to study law in Montreal and married Henriette Armand on October 4, 1847. After marriage, the couple moved to Saint-Vincent-de-Paul, Quebec, where Bellerose entered business and began farming. There, he joined the militia and raised twenty volunteer regiments, before his commissioning as ensign in the 2nd Battalion of Terrebonne militia on December 6, 1855. On January 29, 1857, Bellerose was made captain of the 1st Company of Saint-Vincent-de-Paul volunteer militia and on December 4 of that same year was made a brigade major. The next year, he was approached regarding a captaincy position in the 100th foot of the regular army, but declined the offer for reasons unknown. On May 22, 1861, he became brigade major of Military District No. 8 and commanding officer of the new 12th Battalion of Volunteer Militia on October 29, 1862.

== Political career ==
In 1861, Bellerose made an attempted entry into politics by running against Louis-Siméon Morin for the Quebec Legislative Assembly of Canada constituency of Laval. Two years later, he made another attempt, and this time was successful, winning the constituency with a majority of just 94. He was first elected to the House of Commons of Canada in the 1867 elections in the Quebec riding of Laval. A Conservative, he was re-elected in the 1872 elections. He was also elected to the Legislative Assembly of Quebec, and served there on occasion at the same time as serving in the House of Commons of Canada. In 1873, he was appointed to the Senate of Canada representing the senatorial division of De Lanaudière, Quebec.

It was due to the insistence of Bellerose that from 1877, the record of debates in the Senate of Canada was translated into French, a reminder of his roots in Quebec.

During his political career, Bellerose served in several other roles, including justice of the peace, mayor of Saint-Vincent-de-Paul, Quebec (at the same time as serving in the federal Senate representing a constituency) and president of the Union Navigation Company. He died in office in 1899, aged seventy-nine years and one month. Bellerose is buried in the Saint-Vincent-de-Paul, Quebec, parish church vault.

== Electoral record ==
1872 Canadian federal election: Laval
Party	Candidate	Votes
Conservative	Joseph-Hyacinthe Bellerose	acclaimed
Source: Canadian Elections Database

1867 Canadian federal election: Laval
Party	Candidate	Votes
Conservative	Joseph-Hyacinthe Bellerose	acclaimed
Source: Canadian Elections Database
