= Guy Ricard =

Canadian politician

Guy Ricard (born 2 August 1942 in Saint-Côme, Quebec) was a Progressive Conservative member of the House of Commons of Canada. He was an engineer by career.

He represented the Quebec riding of Laval where he was first elected in the 1984 federal election and re-elected in 1988, therefore becoming a member in the 33rd and 34th Canadian Parliaments.

After the riding was renamed Laval West, Ricard was defeated in the 1993 federal election by Michel Dupuy of the Liberals.

== Electoral record (incomplete) ==
1988 Canadian federal election: Laval
Party	Candidate	Votes	%	±%
Progressive Conservative	Guy Ricard (incumbent)	26,858	49.11	
Liberal	Céline Hervieux-Payette	18,819	34.41	
New Democratic	Paul Cappon	8,546	15.63	
Commonwealth of Canada	Mario Ouellet	468	0.86	
Total valid votes		54,691	100.00	–
Total rejected ballots		1,331	–	–
Turnout		56,022	79.25	–
Electors on the lists		70,688	–	–
Source: Report of the Chief Electoral Officer, Thirty-fourth General Election, 1988.
