= Michel Dupuy =

Canadian diplomat and politician (1930–2023)

Michel Dupuy PC

Ambassador of Canada to France
- In office 30 September 1981 – 1985
- Prime Minister: Pierre Trudeau
- Preceded by: Gérard Pelletier
- Succeeded by: Lucien Bouchard

Permanent Representative of Canada to the United Nations
- In office 6 May 1980 – May 1981
- Prime Minister: Pierre Trudeau
- Preceded by: William H. Barton
- Succeeded by: Gérard Pelletier

Member of Parliament for Laval West
- In office 25 October 1993 – 1 June 1997
- Preceded by: Guy Ricard
- Succeeded by: Raymonde Folco

Minister of Multiculturalism and Citizenship
- In office 4 November 1993 – 24 January 1996
- Prime Minister: Jean Chrétien
- Preceded by: Gerry Weiner
- Succeeded by: Sheila Copps

Minister of Communications
- In office 4 November 1993 – 24 January 1996
- Prime Minister: Jean Chrétien
- Preceded by: Monique Landry
- Succeeded by: Sheila Copps

Personal details
- Born: January 11, 1930 Paris, France
- Died: July 9, 2023 (aged 93) Boucherville, Quebec, Canada
- Party: Liberal
- Spouse: Micheline Dallaire
- Parent: Pierre Dupuy (father)
- Education: University of Oxford; University of Paris
- Occupation: Diplomat, journalist, academic, politician

Michel Dupuy PC (French pronunciation: [miʃɛl dypɥi]; January 11, 1930 – July 9, 2023) was a Canadian diplomat, journalist, academic and politician.

== Biography ==
Michel Dupuy was born in Paris, France, on January 11, 1930. His father, Pierre Dupuy, was also a Canadian diplomat.

Dupuy was a longtime diplomat in the Department of External Affairs. He served as Ambassador to the United Nations from 1980 to 1981 and Ambassador to France from 1981 to 1985.

Dupuy entered politics but was defeated in his attempt to win a seat in the House of Commons of Canada in the 1988 election. He was elected on his second attempt in the 1993 election as the Liberal Member of Parliament for Laval West. He immediately joined the Cabinet and served concurrently as Minister of Communications and Minister of Multiculturalism and Citizenship from 1993 until January 1996. During his tenure, the departments that he oversaw were merged into the new Department of Canadian Heritage

Dupuy came under fire for "representing a constituency in a Canadian Radio-television and Telecommunications Commission (CRTC) application" because he was the minister responsible for the agency and was dropped from the Cabinet.

Dupuy did not run in the 1997 election.

He died in Boucherville, Quebec, on July 9, 2023, at the age of 93.

== Electoral record ==
1993 Canadian federal election: Laval West
Party	Candidate	Votes	%	±%	Expenditures
Liberal	Michel Dupuy	28,449	46.24	–	$60,506
Bloc Québécois	Michel Leduc	26,460	43.01		$44,789
Progressive Conservative	Guy Ricard	4,167	6.77		$59,586
New Democratic Party	Marcella Tardif-Provencher	678	1.10		$2,926
Libertarian	Rick Blatter	649	1.05		$4,038
Natural Law	Eddy Gagné	546	0.89		$270
National	Cyril G. MacNeil	280	0.46		$4,218
Commonwealth	John Ajemian	187	0.30		$0
Abolitionist	Georges Vaudrin	109	0.18		$0
Total valid votes		61,525	100.00		
Total rejected ballots		1,765			
Turnout		63,290	79.62		
Electors on the lists		79,486			
Source: Thirty-fifth General Election, 1993: Official Voting Results, Published by the Chief Electoral Officer of Canada. Financial figures taken from official contributions and expenses provided by Elections Canada.

26th Canadian Ministry (1993–2003) – Cabinet of Jean Chrétien
Cabinet posts (2)
Predecessor	Office	Successor
Gerry Weiner	Minister of Multiculturalism and Citizenship; 1993–1996 styled as Minister of Canadian Heritage	Sheila Copps
Monique Landry	Minister of Communications; 1993–1996 styled as Minister of Canadian Heritage	Sheila Copps
Diplomatic posts
Preceded by William Hickson Barton	Canadian Ambassador to the United Nations; April 1980 – May 1981	Succeeded by Gérard Pelletier
