= José Núñez-Melo =

Canadian politician

Member of Parliament for Laval
- In office May 2, 2011 – October 19, 2015
- Preceded by: Nicole Demers
- Succeeded by: riding dissolved

Personal details
- Born: November 13, 1956 (age 69) Santo Domingo, Dominican Republic
- Party: Green Party (2015–present); New Democratic Party (2011–2015)

José Núñez-Melo (born November 13, 1956) is a former Canadian politician who served as the Member of Parliament (MP) for the riding of Laval from 2011 to 2015. He served as a member of the New Democratic Party (NDP).

== Background ==
Originally from the Dominican Republic, Núñez-Melo graduated from Colegio San Luis Gonzaga in Santo Domingo in 1974. He later managed a hotel in Puerto Plata before immigrating to Canada in 1990. Prior to entering federal politics, he worked for Revenu Québec.

== 2011 election ==
In the 2011 federal election, Núñez-Melo was elected to represent the riding of Laval as part of the NDP's surge in popularity in Quebec, which saw the party capture 59 of the province's 75 seats.

== 2015 election ==
Núñez-Melo was not allowed to run as a NDP candidate in the 2015 federal election for the new riding of Vimy, which included the bulk of his old riding, after he publicly criticized nomination meeting procedures which he claimed were contrary to the rules of the party. The party policy requires open nominations, while Núñez-Melo reportedly wanted a guarantee of automatic renomination as an incumbent MP.

He then ran unsuccessfully in Vimy as a member of the Green Party of Canada.

== Electoral record ==
2015 Canadian federal election: Vimy
| Party | Candidate | Votes | % | ±% | Expenditures |
|---|---|---|---|---|---|
| Liberal | Eva Nassif | 25,082 | 46.15 | +25.8 | – |
| New Democratic | France Duhamel | 11,391 | 20.96 | -21.74 | – |
| Bloc Québécois | Barek Kaddouri | 9,068 | 16.69 | -5.05 | – |
| Conservative | Anthony Mavros | 7,262 | 13.36 | +0.59 | – |
| Green | José Núñez-Melo | 1,280 | 2.36 | +0.43 | – |
| Christian Heritage | Brian Jenkins | 260 | 0.48 | – | – |
| Total valid votes/Expense limit | | 54,343 | 100.0 | | $224,281.29 |
| Total rejected ballots | | 941 | 1.70 | – | |
| Turnout | | 55,284 | 64.36 | – | |
| Eligible voters | | 85,889 | | | |
| Liberal gain from New Democratic | | Swing | | +23.77 | |
Source: Elections Canada

2011 Canadian federal election: Laval
| Party | Candidate | Votes | % | ±% | Expenditures |
|---|---|---|---|---|---|
| New Democratic | José Núñez-Melo | 22,050 | 43.33 | +30.88 | |
| Bloc Québécois | Nicole Demers | 11,567 | 22.73 | -15.06 | |
| Liberal | Eva Nassif | 9,422 | 18.51 | -9.59 | |
| Conservative | Robert Malo | 6,366 | 12.33 | -5.51 | |
| Green | Jocelyne Leduc | 1,260 | 2.48 | -0.70 | |
| Marxist–Leninist | Yvon Breton | 224 | 0.44 | +0.01 | |
| Total valid votes/Expense limit | | 50,889 | 100.00 | | |
| Total rejected ballots | | 738 | 1.43 | -0.07 | |
| Turnout | | 51,627 | 60.74 | -1.50 | |
| Eligible voters | | 84,991 | | | |
| New Democratic gain from Bloc Québécois | | Swing | | +22.97 | |
