= Léopold Demers =

Canadian politician

Member of Parliament for Laval—Two Mountains
- In office December 1948 – June 1949
- Preceded by: Joseph-Roméo-Liguori Lacombe
- Succeeded by: riding merged

Member of Parliament for Laval
- In office June 1949 – March 1958
- Preceded by: riding created
- Succeeded by: Rodrigue Bourdages

Personal details
- Born: 14 August 1912 Quebec City, Quebec, Canada
- Died: 21 November 1990 (aged 78) Laval, Quebec, Canada
- Party: Liberal
- Profession: agrologist

Léopold Demers (14 August 1912 – 21 November 1990) was a Liberal party member of the House of Commons of Canada. He was an agrologist by career.

He was first elected at the Laval—Two Mountains riding in a 20 December 1948 by-election. In the 1949 federal election, he was re-elected at Laval then re-elected for successive terms in 1953 and 1957. Demers was defeated in the 1958 election by Rodrigue Bourdages of the Progressive Conservative party.

1958 Canadian federal election: Laval
Party	Candidate	Votes	%	±%
Progressive Conservative	Rodrigue Bourdages	26,076	47.5	+34.8
Liberal	Léopold Demers	25,363	46.2	-14.4
Co-operative Commonwealth	Jacques Champagne	2,165	3.9	+1.2
Independent PC	Alexandre Joly	796	1.5	
Independent Liberal	Arthur Prévost	476	0.9	
Total valid votes		54,876	100.0	

1957 Canadian federal election: Laval
Party	Candidate	Votes	%	±%
Liberal	Léopold Demers	26,254	60.6	-10.2
Independent	Rodrigue Bourdages	10,333	23.9	
Progressive Conservative	Alexandre Joly	5,525	12.8	-14.0
Co-operative Commonwealth	Gisèle Couture	1,205	2.8	+0.4
Total valid votes		43,317	100.0	

1953 Canadian federal election: Laval
Party	Candidate	Votes	%	±%
Liberal	Léopold Demers	19,337	70.9	+6.1
Progressive Conservative	Louis Jarry	7,309	26.8	-8.4
Co-operative Commonwealth	Joseph-Roméo Martin	645	2.4	
Total valid votes		27,291	100.0	

1949 Canadian federal election: Laval
Party	Candidate	Votes	%
Liberal	Léopold Demers	18,202	64.8
Progressive Conservative	Léopold Pouliot	9,888	35.2
Total valid votes		28,090	100.0
