= Yves Robillard =

Canadian politician (born 1942)

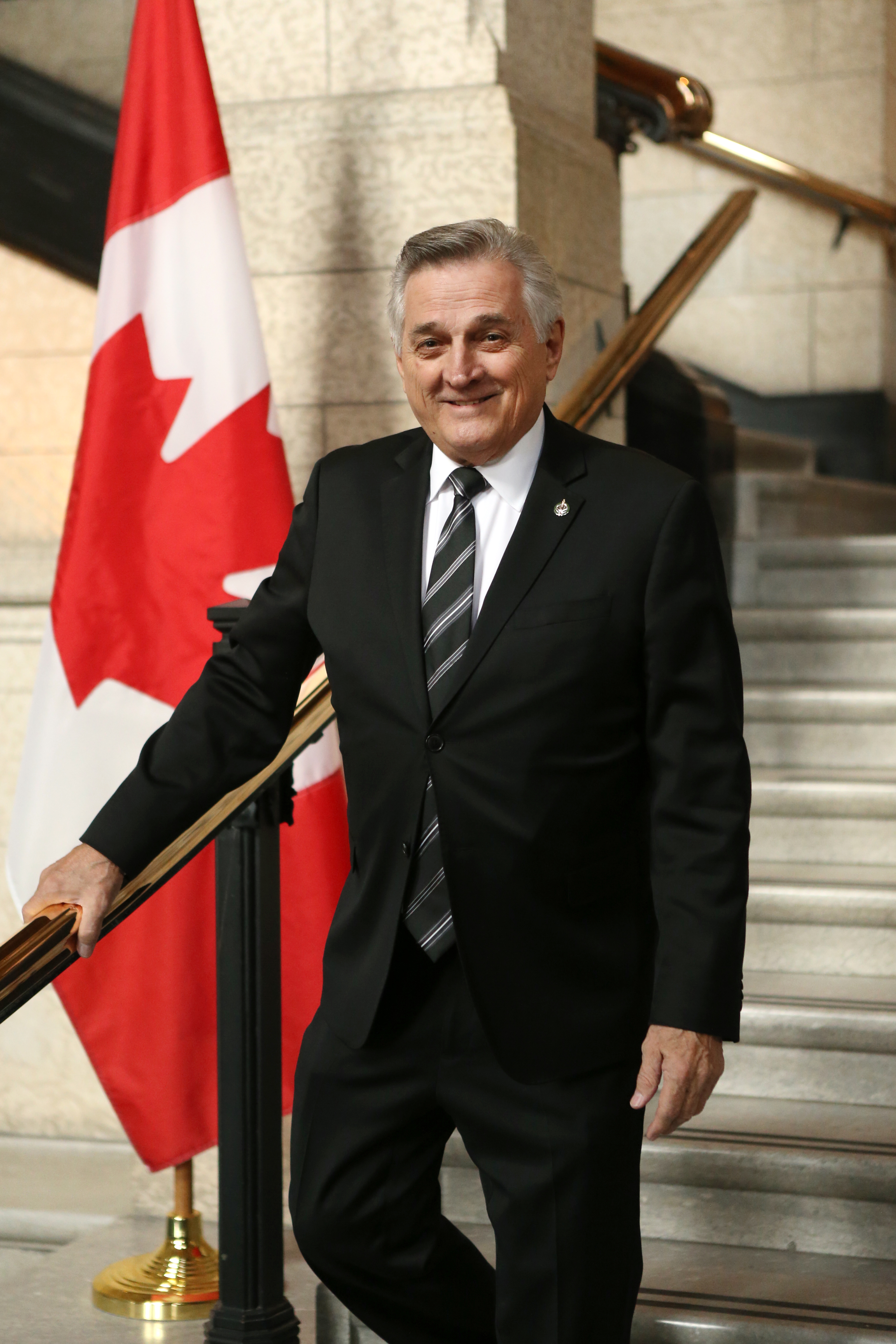

Member of Parliament for Marc-Aurèle-Fortin
- In office October 19, 2015 – March 23, 2025
- Prime Minister: Justin Trudeau
- Preceded by: Alain Giguère
- Succeeded by: Carlos Leitão

Personal details
- Born: 1942 (age 83–84) Verdun, Quebec, Canada
- Party: Liberal

Yves Robillard (born 1942) is a Canadian politician, who was elected to represent the riding of Marc-Aurèle-Fortin in the House of Commons of Canada in the 2015 Canadian federal election. He did not seek re-election in 2025.

He sat on two committees, the Standing Committee on National Defence and the Standing Committee on Human Resources, Skills and Social Development and the Status of Persons with Disabilities. Because of his experience and abilities, Yves is often tasked with official representations on the international scene.

On December 22, 2021, Robillard was removed from the Standing Committee on National Defence. This was in response to Robillard having been discovered to have partaken in non-essential travel outside of Canada, disregarding an advisory against such activity.

== Electoral record ==
2019 Canadian federal election: Marc-Aurèle-Fortin
Party	Candidate	Votes	%	±%	Expenditures
Liberal	Yves Robillard	24,865	44.55	+3.53	$25,135.91
Bloc Québécois	Lizabel Nitoi	18,069	32.37	+10.65	$9,590.09
Conservative	Sonia Baudelot	5,423	9.72	-2.22	none listed
New Democratic	Ali Faour	4,741	8.49	-15.10	$9,355.12
Green	Bao Tran Le	2,111	3.78	+1.84	$0.00
People's	Emilio Migliozzi	465	0.83	n/a	none listed
Independent	Elias Progakis	143	0.26	n/a	
Total valid votes/expense limit		55,817	100.0		
Total rejected ballots		924	1.63%		
Turnout		56,741	72.40		
Eligible voters		78,371			
Liberal hold		Swing		-3.56	
Source: Elections Canada

2015 Canadian federal election
Party	Candidate	Votes	%	±%	Expenditures
Liberal	Yves Robillard	22,323	41.02	+27.17	$11,004.21
New Democratic	Marie-Josée Lemieux	12,827	23.59	-25.39	$54,504.31
Bloc Québécois	Patrice Jasmin-Tremblay	11,820	21.72	-2.55	$22,415.01
Conservative	Nicolas Makridis	6,498	11.94	+1.57	$3,236.86
Green	Lorna Mungur	1,057	1.94	-0.4	–
Total valid votes/Expense limit		54,425	100.0		$209,180.83
Total rejected ballots		769	–	–	
Turnout		55,294	–	–	
Eligible voters		76,162			
Source: Elections Canada
