= Marcel-Claude Roy =

Canadian politician

Marcel-Claude Roy (11 September 1936 – 31 May 2018) was a Liberal party member of the House of Commons of Canada. Born in Laval-des-Rapides, Quebec, Roy was an agrologist by career.

He entered national politics at the Quebec riding of Laval in the 1968 federal election. He was re-elected at Laval (subsequently Laval West) in the 1972, 1974, 1979 and 1980 federal elections but was defeated by Guy Ricard of the Progressive Conservative party. Roy served five successive terms from the 28th to the 32nd Canadian Parliaments.

1974 Canadian federal election: Laval
Party	Candidate	Votes	%	±%
Liberal	Marcel-Claude Roy	29,715	65.3	+6.5
Progressive Conservative	Marial Jolicoeur	7,224	15.9	+2.9
New Democratic	Paul Laliberté	4,258	9.4	-2.9
Social Credit	Pierre Gouroff	3,922	8.6	-5.9
Independent	Maurice Juteau	382	0.8	
Total valid votes		45,501	100.0	

1972 Canadian federal election: Laval
Party	Candidate	Votes	%	±%
Liberal	Marcel-Claude Roy	28,121	58.8	-5.5
Social Credit	Pierre Gouroff	6,921	14.5	+12.0
Progressive Conservative	Georges Massicotte	6,219	13.0	+0.5
New Democratic	D.A. Boyle	5,868	12.3	-2.8
Independent	Robert Fine	669	1.4	
Total valid votes		47,798	100.0	
Note: Social Credit vote is compared to Ralliement créditiste vote in the 1968 election.
Source: lop.parl.ca

1968 Canadian federal election: Laval
Party	Candidate	Votes	%	±%
Liberal	Marcel-Claude Roy	24,740	64.4	+13.7
New Democratic	D.-A. Boyle	5,807	15.1	-9.3
Progressive Conservative	Jean-Louis Léger	4,801	12.5	-2.9
Franc Lib	Jean-Roger Marcotte	2,141	5.6	
Ralliement créditiste	Thomas Leclerc	940	2.4	-7.1
Total valid votes		38,429	100.0	
