= Annie Koutrakis =

Canadian politician (born 1960)

Annie Koutrakis MP

Member of Parliament for Vimy
- Incumbent
- Assumed office October 21, 2019
- Preceded by: Eva Nassif

Parliamentary Secretary to the Minister of Jobs and Families
- Incumbent
- Assumed office June 5, 2025 Serving with Leslie Church

Parliamentary Secretary to the Minister of Tourism and Minister responsible for the Economic Development Agency of Canada for the Regions of Quebec
- In office December 3, 2021 – March 23, 2025

Personal details
- Born: November 22, 1960 (age 65) Montreal, Quebec
- Party: Liberal
- Profession: Politician
- Committees: LANG, BILI, TRAN, STRA

Annie Koutrakis MP (born November 22, 1960) is a Canadian Liberal politician who was elected as a member of parliament (MP) in the House of Commons of Canada to represent the federal riding of Vimy during the 2019 Canadian federal election, and was re-elected in the 2021 Canadian Federal Election. MP Koutrakis currently serves as parliamentary secretary to the minister of tourism and minister responsible for the Economic Development Agency of Canada for the Regions of Quebec. MP Koutrakis is also a current member of four committees: Standing Committee on official Languages (LANG), Standing Joint Committee on the Library of Parliament (BILI), Standing Committee on Transport, Infrastructure and Communities (TRAN), and Subcommittee on Agenda and Procedure of the Standing Committee on Transport, Infrastructure and Communities (STRA). Prior to becoming a member of parliament, she worked in investment firms for 30 years.

== Early life ==
Koutrakis was born in Montreal and lived in Laval for 26 years. She received her diploma in social sciences/business administration from Dawson College and has studied human resources management at Concordia University. She is fluently trilingual (French, English, and Greek).

Before starting her political career, Koutrakis was elected as the president, CEO, and chair of the executive committee of the board of directors of the Hellenic Community of Greater Montreal. Koutrakis was the first woman to hold this position. She previously served on the board of CLSC Normand-Bethune, the Hellenic Social Services of Quebec, and the Hellenic Board of Trade of Montreal. She was vice president of the parents committee at Ecole Démosthènes, and served on the Alexandria Fundraising Committee in Laval.

== Political career ==
Koutrakis was first elected as an MP in 2019, during the 2019 Canadian federal election. She ran in the riding of Vimy, which is one of the four electoral districts in the city of Laval, Quebec, and won the election with a comfortable margin. She replaced outgoing Liberal MP Eva Nassif, who served as the Liberal MP in the riding from 2015 to 2019.

Koutrakis was a member of the Standing Committee on Finance and a member of the Special Joint Committee on Medical Aid in Dying, a committee made up of Members of Parliament and Senators who are conducting the five-year review of Medical Assistance in Dying in Canada. MP Koutrakis is also part of various parliamentary associations and interparliamentary groups.

On March 23, 2020, Koutrakis introduced Bill C-276, entitled An Act to designate the Month of March as Hellenic Heritage Month, in the House of Commons.

== Electoral record ==
2025 Canadian federal election: Vimy
Party	Candidate	Votes	%	±%	Expenditures
Liberal	Annie Koutrakis	26,531	53.41	+3.27	$75,654.89
Conservative	Grace Daou	12,278	24.72	+10.87	$44,245.39
Bloc Québécois	Alicia Parenteau-Malakhanian	8,526	17.16	–5.18	$3,221.59
New Democratic	Cindy Mercer	2,342	4.71	–4.62	$0.00
Total valid votes/expense limit		50,863	97.72	–	$130,516.04
Total rejected ballots		1,186	2.28		
Turnout		52,049	60.24		
Eligible voters		84,434			
Liberal hold		Swing		–3.83	
Source: Elections Canada

2021 Canadian federal election: Vimy
Party	Candidate	Votes	%	±%	Expenditures
Liberal	Annie Koutrakis	25,316	49.8	+2.1	$46,634.36
Bloc Québécois	Rachid Bandou	11,811	23.2	-4.6	$3,040.51
Conservative	Rima El-Helou	6,829	13.4	+2.7	$6,647.90
New Democratic	Vassif Aliev	4,731	9.3	+0.7	$24.86
People's	Alejandro Morales-Loaiza	2,175	4.3	+3.0	$814.48
Total valid votes/expense limit		50,862	97.8	–	$117,288.36
Total rejected ballots		1,149	2.2		
Turnout		52,011	58.9		
Eligible voters		88,313			
Liberal hold		Swing		+3.4	
Source: Elections Canada

2019 Canadian federal election: Vimy
Party	Candidate	Votes	%	±%	Expenditures
Liberal	Annie Koutrakis	26,490	47.7	+1.55	$72,682.40
Bloc Québécois	Claire-Emmanuelle Beaulieu	15,455	27.8	+11.11	$4,014.05
Conservative	Rima El-Helou	5,951	10.7	-2.66	$19,197.89
New Democratic	Vassif Aliev	4,779	8.6	-12.36	none listed
Green	Faiza R'Guiba	2,125	3.8	+1.44	$413.25
People's	Suzanne Brunelle	733	1.3		$0.00
Total valid votes/expense limit		55,533	100.0		
Total rejected ballots		1,057			
Turnout		56,590	64.25		
Eligible voters		88,077			
Liberal hold		Swing		-4.78	
Source: Elections Canada
