= Canadian Civil Liberties Association =

Legal advocacy organization

- Abbreviation: CCLA
- Predecessor: Association for Civil Liberties (ACL)
- Formation: 1964; 62 years ago
- Founders: Irving Himel; Pierre Berton; June Callwood; Bora Laskin; Mark MacGuigan; Harry Arthurs; John Keiller MacKay
- Type: registered charity
- Registration no.: 754802288 RR0001
- Purpose: Civil liberties advocacy
- Headquarters: Toronto, Ontario, Canada
- Region served: Canada
- Official language: English, French
- Executive Director and General Counsel: Howard Sapers
- Website: ccla.org

The Canadian Civil Liberties Association (CCLA; French: Association Canadienne des Libertés Civiles) is a nonprofit organization in Canada devoted to the defence of civil liberties and constitutional rights.

== History ==
The CCLA was founded in 1964 in Toronto, prompted by the Ontario government's proposal of a bill that would have granted special powers to the police in the face of a rise in organized crime. Its predecessor was the Association for Civil Liberties (ACL). At its foundation, the ACL had been intended to address national issues; however, its focus shifted primarily to issues specific to Ontario. The ACL was led by Irving Himel, and in response to the bill, he gathered human rights leaders in Toronto, including Pierre Berton, June Callwood, Bora Laskin, Mark MacGuigan, Harry Arthurs, and John Keiller MacKay, and they formed the CCLA with Mackay as its honorary president.

In 1968, the CCLA won a grant from the Ford Foundation to study due process in Canadian lower courts and used the findings as a guide for its advocacy in the ensuing years.

The CCLA was one of the few groups in Canada that protested the 1970 invocation of the War Measures Act by then Prime Minister of Canada Pierre Trudeau in response to the October Crisis in Quebec.

In the opinion of Dominique Clément, its most enduring contribution in the 20th century was its influence on the drafting of the 1982 Canadian Charter of Rights and Freedoms.

The CCLA acted at the Rouleau Commission into the use of the Emergencies Act to quell the Freedom Convoy which arose in the aftermath of the government-mandated vaccine for COVID-19.

== Leadership ==
Alan Borovoy served as general counsel of the organization from 1968 to 2009 and under his leadership, he and the CCLA became famous throughout Canada as defenders of free speech and civil liberties. He continued as general counsel emeritus from 2009 until his death in 2015.

Nathalie Des Rosiers was CCLA's general counsel from 2009 to 2013.

Sukanya Pillay was executive director and general counsel from 2014 until 2017, and had been acting general counsel from 2013 to 2014.

Former Attorney-General of Ontario Michael Bryant was appointed executive director and general counsel in 2018 and served until January 1, 2022 when he left to become executive director of Legal Aid BC.

Noa Mendelsohn-Aviv was appointed executive director and general counsel on February 9, 2022. She served until December 2024. She had previously been acting executive director and general counsel from 2017 to 2018.

Abby Deshman was appointed interim executive director and general counsel in December 2024.

Howard Sapers was appointed executive director and general counsel on July 15, 2025.

== See also ==
- Canadian Civil Liberties Education Trust
- British Columbia Civil Liberties Association
- American Civil Liberties Union
- American Civil Rights Union
- New York Civil Liberties Union
