= Charles-Avila Wilson =

Canadian politician

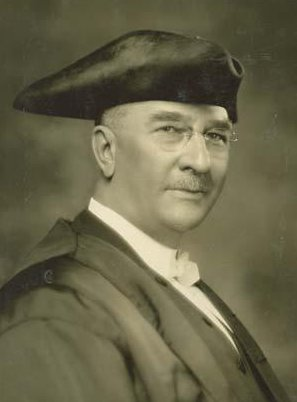

Member of the Canadian Parliament for Laval
- In office 1908–1917
- Preceded by: Joseph-Édouard-Émile Léonard
- Succeeded by: Electoral district abolished

Personal details
- Born: 10 December 1869 L'Île-Bizard, Quebec, Canada
- Died: 7 April 1936 (aged 66)

Charles-Avila Wilson (10 December 1869 – 7 April 1936) was a Canadian lawyer, politician, and judge.

Born in Île Bizard, Quebec, Canada, Wilson was a lawyer by profession. He was elected to the House of Commons of Canada for the electoral district of Laval in the 1908 federal election. A Liberal, he was re-elected in the 1911 federal election. He was later appointed a judge.

== Electoral record ==
1911 Canadian federal election: Laval
Party	Candidate	Votes	%	±%
Liberal	Charles-Avila Wilson	2,648	52.0	+1.2
Conservative	Joseph-Édouard-Émile Léonard	2,449	48.0	-1.2
Total valid votes		5,097	100.0	

1908 Canadian federal election: Laval
Party	Candidate	Votes	%	±%
Liberal	Charles-Avila Wilson	2,194	50.8	+1.4
Conservative	Joseph-Édouard-Émile Léonard	2,125	49.2	-1.4
Total valid votes		4,319	100.0	
