= William Hickson Barton =

Canadian diplomat

- Born: December 10, 1917; Winnipeg, Manitoba
- Died: November 8, 2013 (aged 95); Ottawa, Ontario
- Occupation: diplomat
- Awards: Order of Canada

William Hickson Barton, CM (December 10, 1917 – November 8, 2013) was a Canadian diplomat.

== Biography ==
Born in Winnipeg, Manitoba, he received a Bachelor of Arts degree in 1940 from the University of British Columbia. During World War II, he served in the Canadian Army. After the war, in 1946, he joined the Canadian civil service in the Defence Research Board as a Secretary. In 1950, he was a Secretary at the National Aeronautical Research Committee. In 1952, he joined the Department of External Affairs and served in Vienna, Geneva, and at the United Nations. From 1957 to 1959, he was an Alternate Governor for Canada at the International Atomic Energy Agency. In 1964, he was appointed Head of the United Nations Division in the Department of External Affairs and in 1970 was appointed an Assistant Under-Secretary State for External Affairs.

In 1972, he was appointed Ambassador and Permanent Representative for Canada at the United Nations in Geneva. From 1976 to 1979, he was Ambassador and Permanent Representative for Canada at the United Nations in New York, during which time he was part of the passage of Resolution 417 and Resolution 418. In June 1977 and July 1978, he served as President of the United Nations Security Council.

From 1984 to 1989, he was the first Chairman of the Board of Directors of the Canadian Institute for International Peace and Security.

In 1993, he was made a Member of the Order of Canada for having "enhanced Canada's role and stature in the international community".

Carleton University awarded a degree of Doctor of Laws, honoris causa, to William Barton in its 132nd Convocation Ceremony on June 11, 2008.

He died on November 8, 2013, aged 95.

Diplomatic posts
Preceded by Saul Rae	Canadian Ambassador to the United Nations; August 1976 – April 1980	Succeeded by Michel Dupuy
