= Laval (federal electoral district) =

Former federal electoral district in Quebec, Canada

Quebec electoral district
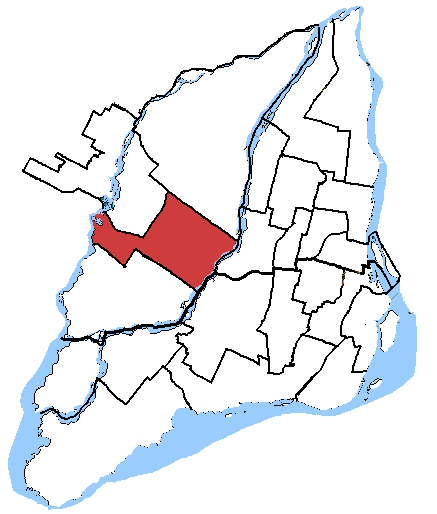
- Laval in relation to other federal electoral districts in Montreal
- Coordinates: 45.578°N 73.742°W

Defunct federal electoral district
- Legislature: House of Commons
- District created: 2003
- District abolished: 2012
- First contested: 2004
- Last contested: 2011
- District webpage: profile, map

Demographics
- Population (2011): 110,376
- Electors (2011): 82,362
- Area (km²): 45.37
- Census division: Laval
- Census subdivision: Laval

Laval (French: [laval]) was a federal electoral district in Quebec, Canada, that was represented in the House of Commons of Canada from 1867 to 1917, 1949 to 1979, and from 2004 to 2015.

== Geography ==
The district included the neighbourhoods of Chomedey, Laval-des-Rapides and Fabreville in the City of Laval. The neighbouring ridings were Papineau, Saint-Laurent—Cartierville, Laval—Les Îles, Rivière-des-Mille-Îles, Marc-Aurèle-Fortin, and Alfred-Pellan.

== History ==
The electoral district of Laval was created in 1867 covering the entire County of Laval (now the City of Laval). In 1914, Laval riding was abolished. The district of Laval—Two Mountains was created from Laval and Two Mountains.

In 1947, the new district of Laval was created from Laval—Two Mountains and Mercier. In 1976, riding was abolished when it was redistributed into Laval-des-Rapides and Mille-Îles ridings.

In 1977, a new Laval riding was created. In 1990, it was renamed Laval West.

In 2003, a new Laval riding was created from Laval Centre and Laval West ridings.

It was abolished for the 2015 election, and dissolved into Vimy and Marc-Aurèle-Fortin.

=== Members of Parliament ===
This riding has elected the following members of Parliament:

| Parliament | Years | Member | Party |
|---|---|---|---|
Laval
| 1st | 1867–1872 | Joseph-Hyacinthe Bellerose | Conservative |
| 2nd | 1872–1873 | Joseph-Hyacinthe Bellerose | Conservative |
| 2nd | 1873–1874 | Joseph-Aldric Ouimet | Conservative |
| 3rd | 1874–1878 | Joseph-Aldric Ouimet | Conservative |
| 4th | 1878–1882 | Joseph-Aldric Ouimet | Conservative |
| 5th | 1882–1887 | Joseph-Aldric Ouimet | Conservative |
| 6th | 1887–1891 | Joseph-Aldric Ouimet | Conservative |
| 7th | 1891–1892 | Joseph-Aldric Ouimet | Conservative |
| 7th | 1892–1896 | Joseph-Aldric Ouimet | Conservative |
| 8th | 1896–1900 | Thomas Fortin | Liberal |
| 9th | 1900–1901 | Thomas Fortin | Liberal |
| 9th | 1902–1904 | Joseph-Édouard-Émile Léonard | Conservative |
| 10th | 1904–1908 | Joseph-Édouard-Émile Léonard | Conservative |
| 11th | 1908–1911 | Charles-Avila Wilson | Liberal |
| 12th | 1911–1917 | Charles-Avila Wilson | Liberal |
Riding dissolved into Laval—Two Mountains
Riding re-created from Laval—Two Mountains and Mercier
| 21st | 1949–1953 | Léopold Demers | Liberal |
| 22nd | 1953–1957 | Léopold Demers | Liberal |
| 23rd | 1957–1958 | Léopold Demers | Liberal |
| 24th | 1958–1962 | Rodrigue Bourdages | Progressive Conservative |
| 25th | 1962–1963 | Jean-Léo Rochon | Liberal |
| 26th | 1963–1965 | Jean-Léo Rochon | Liberal |
| 27th | 1965–1968 | Jean-Léo Rochon | Liberal |
| 28th | 1968–1972 | Marcel-Claude Roy | Liberal |
| 29th | 1972–1974 | Marcel-Claude Roy | Liberal |
| 30th | 1974–1979 | Marcel-Claude Roy | Liberal |
Riding dissolved into Laval-des-Rapides and Mille-Îles
Riding re-created from Laval Centre and Laval West
| 38th | 2004–2006 | Nicole Demers | Bloc Québécois |
| 39th | 2006–2008 | Nicole Demers | Bloc Québécois |
| 40th | 2008–2011 | Nicole Demers | Bloc Québécois |
| 41st | 2011–2015 | José Núñez-Melo | New Democratic |
| 41st | 2015–2015 | José Núñez-Melo | Independent |
Riding dissolved into Vimy and Marc-Aurèle-Fortin

== Election results ==
=== 2004-present ===
2011 Canadian federal election
| Party | Candidate | Votes | % | ±% | Expenditures |
|---|---|---|---|---|---|
| New Democratic | José Núñez-Melo | 22,050 | 43.33 | +30.88 | |
| Bloc Québécois | Nicole Demers | 11,567 | 22.73 | -15.06 | |
| Liberal | Eva Nassif | 9,422 | 18.51 | -9.59 | |
| Conservative | Robert Malo | 6,366 | 12.33 | -5.51 | |
| Green | Jocelyne Leduc | 1,260 | 2.48 | -0.70 | |
| Marxist–Leninist | Yvon Breton | 224 | 0.44 | +0.01 | |
| Total valid votes/expense limit | | 50,889 | 100.00 | | |
| Total rejected ballots | | 738 | 1.43 | -0.07 | |
| Turnout | | 51,627 | 60.74 | -1.50 | |
| Eligible voters | | 84,991 | – | – | |

2008 Canadian federal election
| Party | Candidate | Votes | % | ±% | Expenditures |
|---|---|---|---|---|---|
| Bloc Québécois | Nicole Demers | 19,085 | 37.79 | -6.6 | $68,964 |
| Liberal | Alia Haddad | 14,190 | 28.10 | +2.5 | $19,244 |
| Conservative | Jean-Pierre Bélisle | 9,101 | 18.02 | -0.6 | $73,966 |
| New Democratic | Alain Giguère | 6,289 | 12.45 | +4.3 | $1,831 |
| Green | Eric Madelein | 1,607 | 3.18 | -0.2 | |
| Marxist–Leninist | Yvon Breton | 221 | 0.43 | – | |
| Total valid votes/expense limit | | 50,493 | 100.00 | $86,875 | |
| Total rejected ballots | | 769 | 1.50 | | |
| Turnout | | 51,262 | 62.24 | | |

2006 Canadian federal election
| Party | Candidate | Votes | % | ±% | Expenditures | |
|---|---|---|---|---|---|---|
| Bloc Québécois | Nicole Demers | 22,032 | 44.3 | -5.7 | – | $74,484 |
| Liberal | Alia Haddad | 12,698 | 25.6 | -10.6 | – | $23,250 |
| Conservative | Émilio Migliozzi | 9,236 | 18.6 | +12.2 | – | $5,780 |
| New Democratic | Benoit Beauchamp | 4,047 | 8.1 | +4.0 | – | $1,467 |
| Green | Philippe Mari | 1,666 | 3.4 | +1.1 | – | $828 |
| Total | | 49,679 | 100.0 | $80,650 | | |

2004 Canadian federal election
| Party | Candidate | Votes | % | ±% | Expenditures |
|---|---|---|---|---|---|
| Bloc Québécois | Nicole Demers | 24,425 | 50.1 | – | $61,946 |
| Liberal | Pierre Lafleur | 17,639 | 36.2 | – | $67,777 |
| Conservative | Stéphane D'Amours | 3,115 | 6.4 | – | $12,823 |
| New Democratic | Alain Giguère | 1,998 | 4.1 | – | $221 |
| Green | Damien Pichereau | 1,091 | 2.2 | – | |
| Marijuana | Pierre Losier-Côté | 492 | 1.0 | – | |
| Total valid votes/expense limit | | 48,760 | 100.0 | $79,622 | |

=== 1979-1993 ===
See Laval West.

=== 1949-1979 ===
1974 Canadian federal election
| Party | Candidate | Votes | % | ±% |
|---|---|---|---|---|
| Liberal | Marcel-Claude Roy | 29,715 | 65.3 | +6.5 |
| Progressive Conservative | Marial Jolicoeur | 7,224 | 15.9 | +2.9 |
| New Democratic | Paul Laliberté | 4,258 | 9.4 | -2.9 |
| Social Credit | Pierre Gouroff | 3,922 | 8.6 | -5.9 |
| Independent | Maurice Juteau | 382 | 0.8 | |
| Total valid votes | | 45,501 | 100.0 | |

1972 Canadian federal election
| Party | Candidate | Votes | % | ±% |
|---|---|---|---|---|
| Liberal | Marcel-Claude Roy | 28,121 | 58.8 | -5.5 |
| Social Credit | Pierre Gouroff | 6,921 | 14.5 | +12.0 |
| Progressive Conservative | Georges Massicotte | 6,219 | 13.0 | +0.5 |
| New Democratic | D.A. Boyle | 5,868 | 12.3 | -2.8 |
| Independent | Robert Fine | 669 | 1.4 | |
| Total valid votes | | 47,798 | 100.0 | |
Note: Social Credit vote is compared to Ralliement créditiste vote in the 1968 election.
Source: lop.parl.ca

1968 Canadian federal election
| Party | Candidate | Votes | % | ±% |
|---|---|---|---|---|
| Liberal | Marcel-Claude Roy | 24,740 | 64.4 | +13.7 |
| New Democratic | D.-A. Boyle | 5,807 | 15.1 | -9.3 |
| Progressive Conservative | Jean-Louis Léger | 4,801 | 12.5 | -2.9 |
| Franc Lib | Jean-Roger Marcotte | 2,141 | 5.6 | |
| Ralliement créditiste | Thomas Leclerc | 940 | 2.4 | -7.1 |
| Total valid votes | | 38,429 | 100.0 | |

1965 Canadian federal election
| Party | Candidate | Votes | % | ±% |
|---|---|---|---|---|
| Liberal | Jean-Léo Rochon | 44,533 | 50.7 | -3.3 |
| New Democratic | Louis-Philippe Lecours | 21,484 | 24.4 | +9.0 |
| Progressive Conservative | Rudy Hébert | 13,553 | 15.4 | +1.8 |
| Ralliement créditiste | Jean-Charles Brouillard | 8,349 | 9.5 | -7.5 |
| Total valid votes | | 87,919 | 100.0 | |

Note: Ralliement créditiste vote is compared to Social Credit vote in the 1963 election.

1963 Canadian federal election
| Party | Candidate | Votes | % | ±% |
|---|---|---|---|---|
| Liberal | Jean-Léo Rochon | 43,452 | 53.9 | +4.4 |
| Social Credit | Roland Reeves | 13,701 | 17.0 | +11.1 |
| New Democratic | Louis-Philippe Lecours | 12,478 | 15.5 | +8.2 |
| Progressive Conservative | Georges Long | 10,963 | 13.6 | -17.6 |
| Total valid votes | | 80,594 | 100.0 | |

1962 Canadian federal election
| Party | Candidate | Votes | % | ±% |
|---|---|---|---|---|
| Liberal | Jean-Léo Rochon | 36,248 | 49.5 | +3.3 |
| Progressive Conservative | J.-Rodrigue Bourdages | 22,843 | 31.2 | -16.3 |
| New Democratic | Louis-Ph. Lecours | 5,302 | 7.2 | +3.3 |
| Independent Liberal | Adrien Bonin | 4,513 | 6.2 | |
| Social Credit | Léopold Mercier | 4,294 | 5.9 | |
| Total valid votes | | 73,200 | 100.0 | |

1958 Canadian federal election
| Party | Candidate | Votes | % | ±% |
|---|---|---|---|---|
| Progressive Conservative | Rodrigue Bourdages | 26,076 | 47.5 | +34.8 |
| Liberal | Léopold Demers | 25,363 | 46.2 | -14.4 |
| Co-operative Commonwealth | Jacques Champagne | 2,165 | 3.9 | +1.2 |
| Independent PC | Alexandre Joly | 796 | 1.5 | |
| Independent Liberal | Arthur Prévost | 476 | 0.9 | |
| Total valid votes | | 54,876 | 100.0 | |

1957 Canadian federal election
| Party | Candidate | Votes | % | ±% |
|---|---|---|---|---|
| Liberal | Léopold Demers | 26,254 | 60.6 | -10.2 |
| Independent | Rodrigue Bourdages | 10,333 | 23.9 | |
| Progressive Conservative | Alexandre Joly | 5,525 | 12.8 | -14.0 |
| Co-operative Commonwealth | Gisèle Couture | 1,205 | 2.8 | +0.4 |
| Total valid votes | | 43,317 | 100.0 | |

1953 Canadian federal election
| Party | Candidate | Votes | % | ±% |
|---|---|---|---|---|
| Liberal | Léopold Demers | 19,337 | 70.9 | +6.1 |
| Progressive Conservative | Louis Jarry | 7,309 | 26.8 | -8.4 |
| Co-operative Commonwealth | Joseph-Roméo Martin | 645 | 2.4 | |
| Total valid votes | | 27,291 | 100.0 | |

1949 Canadian federal election
| Party | Candidate | Votes | % |
|---|---|---|---|
| Liberal | Léopold Demers | 18,202 | 64.8 |
| Progressive Conservative | Léopold Pouliot | 9,888 | 35.2 |
| Total valid votes | | 28,090 | 100.0 |

=== 1867-1917 ===
1911 Canadian federal election
| Party | Candidate | Votes | % | ±% |
|---|---|---|---|---|
| Liberal | Charles-Avila Wilson | 2,648 | 52.0 | +1.2 |
| Conservative | Joseph-Édouard-Émile Léonard | 2,449 | 48.0 | -1.2 |
| Total valid votes | | 5,097 | 100.0 | |

1908 Canadian federal election
| Party | Candidate | Votes | % | ±% |
|---|---|---|---|---|
| Liberal | Charles-Avila Wilson | 2,194 | 50.8 | +1.4 |
| Conservative | Joseph-Édouard-Émile Léonard | 2,125 | 49.2 | -1.4 |
| Total valid votes | | 4,319 | 100.0 | |

1904 Canadian federal election
| Party | Candidate | Votes | % | ±% |
|---|---|---|---|---|
| Conservative | Joseph-Édouard-Émile Léonard | 1,842 | 50.6 | +1.1 |
| Liberal | C. Paquette | 1,798 | 49.4 | +0.2 |
| Total valid votes | | 3,640 | 100.0 | |

Canadian federal by-election, 15 January 1902
| Party | Candidate | Votes | % | ±% |
|---|---|---|---|---|
Fortin named Judge of the Superior Court of Quebec, Montreal District, 25 September 1901

1900 Canadian federal election
| Party | Candidate | Votes | % | ±% |
|---|---|---|---|---|
| Liberal | Thomas Fortin | 1,821 | 54.8 | +3.3 |
| Conservative | J.E. Émile Léonard | 1,502 | 45.2 | -3.3 |
| Total valid votes | | 3,323 | 100.0 | |

1896 Canadian federal election
| Party | Candidate | Votes | % | ±% |
|---|---|---|---|---|
| Liberal | Thomas Fortin | 1,541 | 51.5 | +17.9 |
| Conservative | F.J. Bisaillon | 1,449 | 48.5 | -17.9 |
| Total valid votes | | 2,990 | 100.0 | |

By-election on 25 January 1892 Ouimet named Minister of Public Works, 11 January 1892
| Party | Candidate | Votes |
| Liberal–Conservative | Joseph-Aldric Ouimet | acclaimed |

1891 Canadian federal election
| Party | Candidate | Votes | % | ±% |
|---|---|---|---|---|
| Liberal–Conservative | Joseph-Aldric Ouimet | 1,082 | 66.4 | +4.9 |
| Liberal | N.H. Ladouceur | 548 | 33.6 | -4.9 |
| Total valid votes | | 1,630 | 100.0 | |

1887 Canadian federal election
| Party | Candidate | Votes | % |
|---|---|---|---|
| Liberal–Conservative | Joseph-Aldric Ouimet | 854 | 61.5 |
| Liberal | Adolp. Ouimet | 534 | 38.5 |
| Total valid votes | | 1,388 | 100.0 |

1882 Canadian federal election
| Party | Candidate | Votes |
|---|---|---|
| Liberal–Conservative | Joseph-Aldric Ouimet | acclaimed |

1878 Canadian federal election
| Party | Candidate | Votes |
|---|---|---|
| Liberal–Conservative | Joseph-Aldric Ouimet | acclaimed |

1874 Canadian federal election
| Party | Candidate | Votes |
|---|---|---|
| Liberal–Conservative | Joseph-Aldric Ouimet | acclaimed |
Source(s) "Laval, Quebec (1867-08-06 - 1917-10-05)". History of Federal Ridings Since 1867. Library of Parliament.

By-election on 18 October 1873 On Mr. Bellerose being called to the Senate, 7 October 1873
| Party | Candidate | Votes |
| Liberal–Conservative | Joseph-Aldric Ouimet | acclaimed |

1872 Canadian federal election
| Party | Candidate | Votes |
|---|---|---|
| Conservative | Joseph-Hyacinthe Bellerose | acclaimed |
Source: Canadian Elections Database

1867 Canadian federal election
| Party | Candidate | Votes |
|---|---|---|
| Conservative | Joseph-Hyacinthe Bellerose | acclaimed |
Source: Canadian Elections Database

== See also ==
- List of Canadian electoral districts
- Historical federal electoral districts of Canada
