= John Humphrey Centre for Peace and Human Rights =

Canadian human rights education organization

The John Humphrey Centre for Peace and Human Rights is a human rights education organization headquartered in Edmonton, Alberta. It is one of the few human rights education organizations in Canada. It was founded in 1998 in honour of John Humphrey who helped draft the Universal Declaration of Human Rights.

== History ==
The John Humphrey Centre was founded in 1998 at a conference in Edmonton, Alberta that included a visit from Desmond Tutu. It is the only human rights organization in Edmonton. Its activities include an annual human rights award, youth gatherings, annual conference, a Global Youth Assembly, and a summer institute.

== Mandate ==
The John Humphrey Centre draws its mandate and vision from the Universal Declaration of Human Rights."The John Humphrey Centre for Peace and Human Rights envisions a world that manifests a culture of peace and human rights in which the dignity of every person is respected, valued and celebrated. We work to advance a culture of peace and human rights through educational programs and activities, community collaboration and relationship building guided by the principles of the Universal Declaration of Human Rights. Based on the understanding that considering the world through a human rights lens is key to empowering citizens to respond to the ills in our society and our world – from issues like discrimination and bullying to poverty, war and genocide – the John Humphrey Centre is dedicated to human rights education in Edmonton and Beyond through innovative, experiential and transformative programming and events that foster a sense of dignity, responsibility and justice."

== Notable Patrons and Board Members ==
- John Hume
- Desmond Tutu
- Antonio Lamer
- Margaret Kunstler-Humphrey

== Publications ==
Dominique Clement, Search for Equality and Justice, Alberta's Human Rights Story
