= Canadian Civil Liberties Education Trust =

Canadian charitable organization

- Formation: 1967
- Headquarters: Toronto, Ontario, Canada
- Website: cclet.org

The Canadian Civil Liberties Education Trust (CCLET) is a charitable organization focused on the promotion and dissemination of knowledge and understanding amongst the general public of the rights, liberties and duties of all citizens in democracies. CCLET was established in 1967 as the research and educational arm of the Canadian Civil Liberties Association. Its headquarters are in Toronto, Ontario.

CCLET provides free Civil Liberties in the Schools and Teaching Civil Liberties programmes across Ontario. Supported by a grant from the Law Foundation of Ontario, their programs present engaging and interactive civil liberties workshops and seminars in schools and faculties of education throughout Ontario.

Using the Socratic Paedogogical method, students are engaged in discussions about rights, civil liberties, duties of citizens, the Canadian Charter of Rights and Freedoms, and issues and controversies related to democratic societies. These projects help to develop the habits of democracy in young people through critical thinking, balancing of conflicting rights and freedoms, and the support of diverse opinions and views.

== See also ==
- Canadian Civil Liberties Association
- British Columbia Civil Liberties Association
- American Civil Liberties Union
