= Laval West =

Former federal electoral district in Quebec, Canada

Quebec electoral district

Defunct federal electoral district
- Legislature: House of Commons
- District created: 1976
- District abolished: 2003
- First contested: 1979
- Last contested: 2000

Laval West (French: Laval-Ouest; formerly known as Mille-Iles and Laval) was a federal electoral district in Quebec, Canada, which was represented in the House of Commons from 1979 to 2004.

It was created as the riding of "Mille-Iles" in 1976 from parts of Laval riding. It was renamed "Laval" in 1977, and "Laval West" in 1990.

In 2003, the riding was abolished when it was redistributed into Laval and Laval—Les Îles ridings.

== Members of Parliament ==
This riding elected the following members of the House of Commons of Canada:

Parliament	Years	Member	Party
Laval; Riding created from Laval
31st	1979–1980	Marcel-Claude Roy	Liberal
32nd	1980–1984	Marcel-Claude Roy	Liberal
33rd	1984–1988	Guy Ricard	Progressive Conservative
34th	1988–1993	Guy Ricard	Progressive Conservative
Laval West
35th	1993–1997	Michel Dupuy	Liberal
36th	1997–2000	Raymonde Folco	Liberal
37th	2000–2004	Raymonde Folco	Liberal
Riding dissolved into Laval and Laval—Les Îles

== Election results ==
=== Laval, 1977-1993 ===
1979 Canadian federal election
Party	Candidate	Votes
Liberal	Marcel-Claude Roy	40,067
Progressive Conservative	Jean-Louis Léger	5,484
Social Credit	Madeleine Piquette Bédard	4,592
New Democratic	Lauraine Vaillancourt	3,521
Rhinoceros	Jean Bonnier	1,191
Marxist–Leninist	Pierre Carbonneau	196
Union populaire	Yves Scofield	156

1980 Canadian federal election
Party	Candidate	Votes
Liberal	Marcel-Claude Roy	38,580
New Democratic	Lauraine Vaillancourt	5,709
Progressive Conservative	Jean-Louis Léger	3,715
Rhinoceros	Jean Chat Botté Bonnier	1,679
Social Credit	Madeleine Piquette Bédard	1,110
Union populaire	Lucie Poirier	271
Marxist–Leninist	Pierre Carbonneau	142

1984 Canadian federal election
Party	Candidate	Votes
Progressive Conservative	Guy Ricard	30,696
Liberal	Marcel-Claude Roy	23,002
New Democratic	John Fasciano	8,158
Parti nationaliste	Conrad Monière	2,331
Commonwealth of Canada	Jean-Claude Souvray	299

1988 Canadian federal election
Party	Candidate	Votes
Progressive Conservative	Guy Ricard	26,858
Liberal	Céline Hervieux-Payette	18,819
New Democratic	Paul Cappon	8,546
Commonwealth of Canada	Mario Ouellet	468

=== Laval West, 1993-2004 ===
1993 Canadian federal election
Party	Candidate	Votes
Liberal	Michel Dupuy	28,380
Bloc Québécois	Michel Leduc	26,368
Progressive Conservative	Guy Ricard	4,155
Libertarian	Rick Blatter	712
New Democratic	Marcella Tardif-Provencher	678
Natural Law	Eddy Gagné	545
National	Cyril G. MacNeil	295
Commonwealth of Canada	John Ajemian	187
Abolitionist	Georges Vaudrin	110

1997 Canadian federal election
Party	Candidate	Votes
Liberal	Raymonde Folco	31,566
Bloc Québécois	Sylvain Gauthier	19,547
Progressive Conservative	Yves Désormeaux	12,365
New Democratic	Karina Zeidler	1,072

2000 Canadian federal election
Party	Candidate	Votes
Liberal	Raymonde Folco	31,758
Bloc Québécois	Manon Sauvé	19,975
Alliance	Leo Housakos	4,631
Progressive Conservative	Michael Fortier	3,613
Green	Luc Beaulieu	983
New Democratic	Christian Patenaude	764
Marxist–Leninist	Polyvios Tsakanikas	180

== See also ==
- List of Canadian electoral districts
- Historical federal electoral districts of Canada
