= Vimy (electoral district) =

Federal electoral district in Quebec, Canada

Quebec electoral district
- Interactive map of riding boundaries from the 2025 federal election

Federal electoral district
- Legislature: House of Commons
MP
Annie Koutrakis
Liberal
- District created: 2013
- First contested: 2015
- Last contested: 2021
- District webpage: profile, map

Demographics
- Population (2011): 104,373
- Electors (2015): 85,511
- Area (km²): 35
- Pop. density (per km²): 2,982.1
- Census division: Laval
- Census subdivision: Laval (part)

Vimy (French pronunciation: [vimi]) is a federal electoral district in Quebec, Canada, that has been represented in the House of Commons of Canada since 2015.

Vimy was created by the 2012 federal electoral boundaries redistribution and was legally defined in the 2013 representation order. It came into effect upon the call of the 2015 Canadian federal election, held on 19 October 2015. It was created out of parts of the electoral districts of Laval (78%), Laval—Les Îles (12%) and Alfred-Pellan (11%). Following the 2022 Canadian federal electoral redistribution, the riding lost its territory east of Boul. des Laurentides to Alfred-Pellan.

== Members of Parliament ==
This riding has elected the following members of Parliament:

Parliament	Years	Member	Party
Vimy; Riding created from Alfred-Pellan, Laval and Laval—Les Îles
42nd	2015–2019	Eva Nassif	Liberal
43rd	2019–2021	Annie Koutrakis	Liberal
44th	2021–2025	Annie Koutrakis	Liberal
45th	2025–present	Annie Koutrakis	Liberal

== Election results ==
2025 Canadian federal election
** Preliminary results — Not yet official **
Party	Candidate	Votes	%	±%	Expenditures
Liberal	Annie Koutrakis	26,565	53.32	+3.18	
Conservative	Grace Daou	12,300	24.69	+10.84	
Bloc Québécois	Alicia Parenteau-Malakhanian	8,533	17.13	–5.21	
New Democratic	Cindy Mercer	2,425	4.87	–4.46	
Total valid votes/expense limit					
Total rejected ballots					
Turnout		49,823	59.17		
Eligible voters		84,207			
Liberal hold		Swing		–3.83	
Source: Elections Canada

2021 federal election redistributed results
Party	Vote	%
Liberal	22,886	50.14
Bloc Québécois	10,197	22.34
Conservative	6,320	13.85
New Democratic	4,258	9.33
People's	1,983	4.34

2021 Canadian federal election
Party	Candidate	Votes	%	±%	Expenditures
Liberal	Annie Koutrakis	25,316	49.8	+2.1	$46,634.36
Bloc Québécois	Rachid Bandou	11,811	23.2	-4.6	$3,040.51
Conservative	Rima El-Helou	6,829	13.4	+2.7	$6,647.90
New Democratic	Vassif Aliev	4,731	9.3	+0.7	$24.86
People's	Alejandro Morales-Loaiza	2,175	4.3	+3.0	$814.48
Total valid votes/expense limit		50,862	97.8	–	$117,288.36
Total rejected ballots		1,149	2.2		
Turnout		52,011	58.9		
Eligible voters		88,313			
Liberal hold		Swing		+3.4	
Source: Elections Canada

2019 Canadian federal election
Party	Candidate	Votes	%	±%	Expenditures
Liberal	Annie Koutrakis	26,490	47.7	+1.55	$72,682.40
Bloc Québécois	Claire-Emmanuelle Beaulieu	15,455	27.8	+11.11	$4,014.05
Conservative	Rima El-Helou	5,951	10.7	-2.66	$19,197.89
New Democratic	Vassif Aliev	4,779	8.6	-12.36	none listed
Green	Faiza R'Guiba	2,125	3.8	+1.44	$413.25
People's	Suzanne Brunelle	733	1.3		$0.00
Total valid votes/expense limit		55,533	100.0		
Total rejected ballots		1,057			
Turnout		56,590	64.25		
Eligible voters		88,077			
Liberal hold		Swing		-4.78	
Source: Elections Canada

2015 Canadian federal election
Party	Candidate	Votes	%	±%	Expenditures
Liberal	Eva Nassif	25,082	46.15	+25.80	$40,432.16
New Democratic	France Duhamel	11,391	20.96	-21.74	$41,090.18
Bloc Québécois	Barek Kaddouri	9,068	16.69	-5.05	$32,732.98
Conservative	Anthony Mavros	7,262	13.36	+0.59	$61,663.53
Green	José Núñez-Melo	1,280	2.36	+0.43	$22,013.37
Christian Heritage	Brian Jenkins	260	0.48	–	–
Total valid votes/expense limit		54,343	100.0		$224,722.74
Total rejected ballots		941	–	–	
Turnout		55,284	–	–	
Eligible voters		85,889			
Source: Elections Canada

2011 federal election redistributed results
Party	Vote	%
New Democratic	20,140	42.70
Bloc Québécois	10,255	21.74
Liberal	9,597	20.35
Conservative	6,021	12.77
Green	910	1.93
Others	240	0.51

== See also ==
- List of Canadian electoral districts
- Historical federal electoral districts of Canada
