= Nicole Demers =

Canadian politician (1950–2023)

Member of Parliament for Laval
- In office 2004–2011
- Preceded by: Madeleine Dalphond-Guiral
- Succeeded by: José Nunez-Melo

Personal details
- Born: January 15, 1950 Montreal, Quebec, Canada
- Died: July 3, 2023 (aged 73)
- Party: Bloc Québécois
- Profession: health services administrator

Nicole Demers (January 15, 1950 – July 3, 2023) was a Canadian politician who served as the Member of Parliament (MP) for the riding of Laval from 2004 to 2011. She served as a member of the Bloc Québécois (BQ).

== Biography ==
Demers was born in Montreal, Quebec. An administrator of health services and a restaurant owner, Demers was first elected into the House of Commons of Canada in the 2004 Canadian federal election. She was the Bloc Québécois candidate in the riding of Laval and she defeated Liberal Pierre Lafleur by nearly 7,000 votes. She was the Bloc's critic to Families and Caregivers from August 6, 2004, to February 9, 2006, and Bloc's critic for Seniors until 2011. However, she was defeated in the 2011 election by NDP's José Nunez-Melo.

Demers died on July 3, 2023, at the age of 73.
