= Thomas Fortin =

Canadian politician

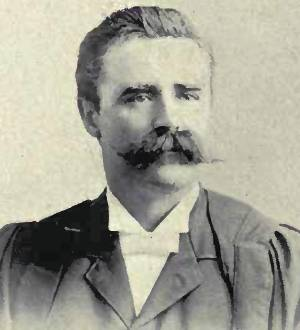
Thomas Fortin

Thomas Fortin (15 December 1853 – 31 March 1933) was a lawyer, judge, educator and political figure in Quebec, Canada. He represented Laval in the House of Commons of Canada from 1896 to 1901 as a Liberal.

He was born in St-François-de-la-Beauce, Beauce County, Canada East, the son of Joseph Fortin and Marie-Louis Vachon. He studied law at the Université Laval and was admitted to the Quebec bar in 1882. Fortin was professor of civil and municipal law at McGill University. Fortin settled at Sainte-Rose in Laval County in 1885. He resigned his seat in the House of Commons in 1901 after he was named to the Quebec Superior Court for Montreal district.

Fortin retired from the bench in December 1919. He died at Sainte-Rose-de-Laval at the age of 79.

== Electoral record ==
1900 Canadian federal election: Laval
Party	Candidate	Votes	%	±%
Liberal	Thomas Fortin	1,821	54.8	+3.3
Conservative	J.E. Émile Léonard	1,502	45.2	-3.3
Total valid votes		3,323	100.0	

1896 Canadian federal election: Laval
Party	Candidate	Votes	%	±%
Liberal	Thomas Fortin	1,541	51.5	+17.9
Conservative	F.J. Bisaillon	1,449	48.5	-17.9
Total valid votes		2,990	100.0	

He was the father of Marc-Aurèle Fortin
