= Canadian federal election results in Nova Scotia =

Electoral history
Year	Results
2025	
2021	
2019	
2015	
2011	
2008	
2006	
2004	
2000	
1997	
1993	
1988	
1984	
1980	
1979	
1974	
1972	
1968	
1965	
1963	
1962	
1958	
1957	
1953	
1949	
1945	
1940	
1935	

Canadian federal elections have provided the following results in Nova Scotia.

== Regional profile ==
Nova Scotia has historically been a conservative region, with former prime ministers Charles Tupper and Robert Borden (native sons who governed as leaders of the historical Conservative Party), and Brian Mulroney (who governed as leader of the successor Progressive Conservative, or PC, Party) along with PC Opposition leader Robert Stanfield (who was previously the province's premier) holding seats in the province for extended periods of time. However, unlike rural ridings in the prairies, most Nova Scotia voters hold Red Tory views rather than socially conservative ones, as reflected in Nova Scotia being one of the few areas in the country where the PCs remained competitive between their 1993 collapse and their 2003 merger with the Canadian Alliance into the present-day Conservative Party of Canada. The Liberals swept Nova Scotia in their 1993 landslide, but lost all eleven seats in 1997—six to the New Democratic Party (NDP) and five to the PCs. Cuts to employment insurance and social programs contributed to the Liberals' losses across Atlantic Canada. Under former leader Alexa McDonough, the NDP made major gains there in 1997, picking up seats in the Halifax and Cape Breton areas. The Liberals resurged to four Nova Scotia seats in 2000 after reversing their employment insurance changes.

Today, the Liberals are at their strongest in Cape Breton and the Halifax area, the NDP are at their strongest in the Halifax area, and the Conservatives are at their strongest in rural mainland Nova Scotia. In 2015, the Liberals swept Nova Scotia in convincing fashion, winning an outright majority of the votes cast in all but one riding; that year, they won every seat in Atlantic Canada. In 2019, the Liberals maintained their dominance in the province, winning 10 out of 11 ridings, with one riding, West Nova, going Conservative. In 2021, the Liberal vote share was stable but they lost two additional seats, Cumberland—Colchester and minister Bernadette Jordan's South Shore—St. Margarets, to the Conservatives.

=== Votes by party throughout time ===

Liberal Conservative New Democratic Green People's	Progressive Conservative (defunct) Alliance (defunct) Reform (defunct)

== Detailed results ==
=== 2025 ===
Electoral district	Candidates						Incumbent
Electoral district	Liberal	Conservative	NDP	Green	PPC	Other	Incumbent
Acadie—Annapolis	Ronnie LeBlanc; 22,491; 46.6%	Chris d'Entremont; 23,024; 47.7%	Ingrid Deon; 1,768; 3.7%	Matthew Piggott; 583; 1.2%	James Strange; 432; 0.9%		Chris d'Entremont; West Nova
Cape Breton—Canso—Antigonish	Jaime Battiste; 24,908; 51.6%	Allan MacMaster; 20,870; 43.2%	Joanna Clark; 1,930; 4.0%		Ryan Smyth; 333; 0.7%	Rebecca Wall (Ind.); 237; 0.5%	Mike Kelloway‡ Cape Breton—Canso (Running in Sydney—Glace Bay)
Central Nova	Sean Fraser; 26,078; 51.9%	Brycen Jenkins; 21,465; 42.7%	Jesiah MacDonald; 1,649; 3.3%	Gerald Romsa; 455; 0.9%	Charlie MacEachern; 331; 0.7%	Alexander MacKenzie (Ind.); 235; 0.5%	Sean Fraser^{¢}
Cumberland—Colchester	Alana Hirtle; 23,929; 48.3%	Stephen Ellis; 22,701; 45.8%	Larry Duchesne; 1,873; 3.8%	Kelly-Ann Callaghan; 694; 1.4%	Paul Church; 333; 0.7%		Stephen Ellis
Dartmouth—Cole Harbour	Darren Fisher; 40,367; 67.7%	Isabelle Obeid; 13,557; 22.7%	Keith Morrison; 4,201; 7.0%	Rana Zaman; 628; 1.1%	Michelle Lindsay; 750; 1.3%	Joseph Shea (Libert.); 131; 0.2%	Darren Fisher
Halifax	Shannon Miedema; 32,886; 63.0%	Mark Boudreau; 9,939; 19.1%	Lisa Roberts; 8,642; 16.6%	Amethyste Hamel-Gregory; 422; 0.8%	Maricar Aliasut; 271; 0.5%		Vacant^{$}
Halifax West	Lena Metlege Diab; 36,200; 65.6%	Rob Batherson; 15,020; 27.2%	Rae Tench; 3,083; 5.6%	Ron G. Parker; 497; 0.9%	Adam LeRue; 384; 0.7%		Lena Metlege Diab
Kings—Hants	Kody Blois; 35,836; 60.6%	Joel Hirtle; 19,773; 33.4%	Paul Doerr; 2,154; 3.6%	Karen Beazley; 825; 1.4%	Alexander Cargill; 591; 1.0%		Kody Blois
Sackville—Bedford—Preston	Braedon Clark; 36,062; 62.0%	Dave Carroll; 18,860; 32.4%	Isaac Wilson; 2,324; 4.0%	Andre Anderson; 526; 0.9%	Ryan Slaney; 418; 0.7%		Darrell Samson†; Sackville—Preston—Chezzetcook
South Shore—St. Margarets	Jessica Fancy-Landry; 27,831; 54.9%	Rick Perkins; 20,864; 41.1%		Mark Embrett; 818; 1.6%	Patrick Shea Boyd; 698; 1.4%	Hayden Henderson (Ind.); 500; 1.0%	Rick Perkins
Sydney—Glace Bay	Mike Kelloway; 25,766; 54.6%	Anna Manley; 17,978; 38.1%	Kimberly Losier; 1,789; 3.8%		Jeffrey Evely; 589; 1.2%	Nik Boisvert (M-L); 85 0.2%	Jaime Battiste‡ Sydney—Victoria (Running in Cape Breton—Canso—Antigonish)
Sydney—Glace Bay	Mike Kelloway; 25,766; 54.6%	Anna Manley; 17,978; 38.1%	Kimberly Losier; 1,789; 3.8%		Jeffrey Evely; 589; 1.2%	Chris Gallant (CFP); 169 0.4%	Jaime Battiste‡ Sydney—Victoria (Running in Cape Breton—Canso—Antigonish)
Sydney—Glace Bay	Mike Kelloway; 25,766; 54.6%	Anna Manley; 17,978; 38.1%	Kimberly Losier; 1,789; 3.8%		Jeffrey Evely; 589; 1.2%	Michael Pittman (Libert.); 189 0.4%	Jaime Battiste‡ Sydney—Victoria (Running in Cape Breton—Canso—Antigonish)
Sydney—Glace Bay	Mike Kelloway; 25,766; 54.6%	Anna Manley; 17,978; 38.1%	Kimberly Losier; 1,789; 3.8%		Jeffrey Evely; 589; 1.2%	Joe Ward (Ind.); 601 1.3%	Jaime Battiste‡ Sydney—Victoria (Running in Cape Breton—Canso—Antigonish)

=== 2021 ===
Electoral district	Candidates						Incumbent
Electoral district	Liberal	Conservative	NDP	Green	PPC	Other	Incumbent
Cape Breton—Canso	Mike Kelloway; 18,288; 46.46%	Fiona MacLeod; 13,805; 35.07%	Jana Reddick; 5,618; 14.27%		Brad Grandy; 1,649; 4.19%		Mike Kelloway
Central Nova	Sean Fraser; 18,682; 46.16%	Steven Cotter; 13,060; 32.27%	Betsy MacDonald; 6,225; 15.38%	Katerina Nikas; 494; 1.22%	Al Muir; 1,445; 3.57%	Chris Frazer (Comm.); 138 0.34%	Sean Fraser
Central Nova	Sean Fraser; 18,682; 46.16%	Steven Cotter; 13,060; 32.27%	Betsy MacDonald; 6,225; 15.38%	Katerina Nikas; 494; 1.22%	Al Muir; 1,445; 3.57%	Harvey Henderson (Ind.); 365 0.90%	Sean Fraser
Central Nova	Sean Fraser; 18,682; 46.16%	Steven Cotter; 13,060; 32.27%	Betsy MacDonald; 6,225; 15.38%	Katerina Nikas; 494; 1.22%	Al Muir; 1,445; 3.57%	Ryan Smyth (Rhino.); 65 0.16%	Sean Fraser
Cumberland—Colchester	Lenore Zann; 13,822; 34.20%	Stephen Ellis; 18,601; 46.02%	Daniel Osborne; 4,984; 12.33%	Jillian Foster; 1,045; 2.59%	Bill Archer; 1,687; 4.17%	Jody O'Blenis (Ind.); 278; 0.69%	Lenore Zann
Dartmouth—Cole Harbour	Darren Fisher; 24,209; 53.06%		Kevin Payne; 15,267; 33.46%	Rana Zaman; 1,371; 3.00%	Michelle Lindsay; 4,781; 10.48%		Darren Fisher
Halifax	Andy Fillmore; 21,905; 42.74%	Cameron Ells; 6,601; 12.88%	Lisa Roberts; 20,347; 39.70%	Jo-Ann Roberts; 1,128; 2.20%	B. Alexander Hébert; 1,069; 2.09%	Katie Campbell (Comm.); 198; 0.39%	Andy Fillmore
Halifax West	Lena Metlege Diab; 24,744; 48.49%	Eleanor Humphries; 11,243; 22.03%	Jonathan Keith Roberts; 12,331; 24.16%	Richard Zurawski; 1,181; 2.31%	Julie Scott; 1,447; 2.84%	Kevin Schulthies (CHP); 85; 0.17%	Geoff Regan†
Kings—Hants	Kody Blois; 20,192; 44.92%	Mark Parent; 13,234; 29.44%	Stephen Schneider; 8,645; 19.23%	Sheila G. Richardson; 940; 2.09%	Steven Ford; 1,945; 4.33%		Kody Blois
Sackville—Preston—Chezzetcook	Darrell Samson; 18,838; 41.31%	Angela Conrad; 12,047; 26.42%	Jenna Chisholm; 12,012; 26.34%	Anthony Edmonds; 933; 2.05%	Earl Gosse; 1,776; 3.89%		Darrell Samson
South Shore—St. Margarets	Bernadette Jordan; 18,575; 37.15%	Rick Perkins; 20,454; 40.90%	Olivia Dorey; 9,541; 19.08%	Thomas Trappenberg; 1,434; 2.87%			Bernadette Jordan
Sydney—Victoria	Jaime Battiste; 14,250; 39.24%	Eddie Orrell; 13,166; 36.26%	Jeff Ward; 7,217; 19.87%	Mark Embrett; 376; 1.04%	Ronald Angus Barron; 1,176; 3.24%	Nikki Boisvert (M-L); 127; 0.35%	Jaime Battiste
West Nova	Alxys Chamberlain; 13,732; 31.30%	Chris d'Entremont; 22,104; 50.38%	Cheryl Burbidge; 5,645; 12.87%		Scott Spidle; 2,390; 5.45%		Chris d'Entremont

=== 2019 ===
Electoral district	Candidates					Incumbent
Electoral district	Conservative	NDP	Liberal	Green	Other	Incumbent
Cape Breton—Canso	Alfie MacLeod; 14,478; 34.6%	Laurie Suitor; 6,258; 15%	Mike Kelloway; 16,097; 38.5%	Clive Doucet; 3,246; 7.8%	Billy Joyce (Peoples Party.); 968; 2.3%	Rodger Cuzner
Central Nova	George Canyon; 13,201; 29.6%	Betsy MacDonald; 5,896; 13.2%	Sean Fraser; 20,718; 46.5%	Barry Randle; 3,478; 7.8%	Al Muir (Peoples party.); 938; 2.1%	Sean Fraser
Cumberland—Colchester	Scott Armstrong; 16,219; 35.7%	Larry Duchesne; 5,451; 12%	Lenore Zann; 16,672; 36.7%	Jason Blanch; 6,015; 13.2%	William Archer (People's Party.); 608; 1.3%	Bill Casey
Dartmouth—Cole Harbour	Jason Cole; 8,480; 16.1%	Emma Norton; 14,220; 27.0%	Darren Fisher; 23,751; 45.2%	Lil MacPherson; 5,197; 9.9%	Michelle Lindsay (Peoples party.); 937; 1.8%	Darren Fisher
Halifax	Bruce Holland; 5,214; 9.7%	Christine Saulnier; 16,594; 31.0%	Andy Fillmore; 23,088; 43.2%	Jo-Ann Roberts; 7,762; 14.5%	Duncan McGenn (People's Party.); 605; 1.1%	Andy Fillmore
Halifax West	Fred Shuman; 10,488; 19.3%	Jacob Wilson; 10,429; 19.2%	Geoff Regan; 26,884; 49.5%	Richard Zurawski; 1,971; 12.1%		Geoff Regan
Kings—Hants	Martha MacQuarrie; 11,905; 24.8%	Stephen Schneider; 8,243; 17.2%	Kody Blois; 20,807; 43.3%	Brogan Anderson; 6,029; 12.6%	Matthew Southall (Peoples party.); 786; 1.6%	Scott Brison
Sackville—Preston—Chezzetcook	Kevin Copley; 11,224; 22.6%	Matt Stickland; 11,857; 23.9%	Darrell Samson; 19,920; 40.2%	Anthony Edmonds; 5,743; 11.6%	Sybil Hogg (Peoples party.); 819; 1.7%	Darrell Samson
South Shore—St. Margarets	Rick Perkins; 14,744; 28.1%	Jessika Hepburn; 8,361; 15.9%	Bernadette Jordan; 21,887; 41.7%	Thomas Trappenburg; 6,070; 11.6%	Robert Monk (People's Party.); 665; 1.3%	Bernadette Jordan
Sydney—Victoria	Eddie Orrell; 11,228; 27.7%	Jodi McDavid; 8,150; 20.1%	Jaime Battiste; 12,536; 30.9%	Lois Foster; 2,249; 5.5%	Archie MacKinnon (Indpt.); 5,679; 14.0%	Mark Eyking
Sydney—Victoria	Eddie Orrell; 11,228; 27.7%	Jodi McDavid; 8,150; 20.1%	Jaime Battiste; 12,536; 30.9%	Lois Foster; 2,249; 5.5%	Kenzie MacNeil (Indpt.); 480; 1.2%	Mark Eyking
West Nova	Chris d'Entremont; 18,390; 39.3%	Matthew Dubois; 5,020; 10.7%	Jason Deveau; 17,034; 36.4%	Judy N. Green; 5,949; 12.7%	Gloria Jane Cook (Indpt.); 453; 1.0%	Colin Fraser

=== 2015 ===
Electoral district	Candidates					Incumbent
Electoral district	Conservative	NDP	Liberal	Green	Other	Incumbent
Cape Breton—Canso	Adam Daniel Rodgers; 6,246; 14.45%	Michelle Smith; 3,547; 8.20%	Rodger Cuzner; 32,163; 74.39%	Maria Goretti Coady; 1,281; 2.96%		Rodger Cuzner
Central Nova	Fred DeLorey; 11,418; 25.80%	Ross Landry; 4,532; 10.24%	Sean Fraser; 25,909; 58.53%	David Hachey; 1,834; 4.14%	Alexander J. MacKenzie (Ind.); 570; 1.29%	Peter MacKay†
Cumberland—Colchester	Scott Armstrong; 12,257; 26.45%	Wendy Robinson; 2,647; 5.71%	Bill Casey; 29,527; 63.73%	Jason Matthew Blanch; 1,650; 3.56%	Kenneth Jackson (Ind.); 181 0.39%	Scott Armstrong; Cumberland—Colchester— Musquodoboit Valley
Cumberland—Colchester	Scott Armstrong; 12,257; 26.45%	Wendy Robinson; 2,647; 5.71%	Bill Casey; 29,527; 63.73%	Jason Matthew Blanch; 1,650; 3.56%	Richard Trueman Plett (Ind.); 70 0.15%	Scott Armstrong; Cumberland—Colchester— Musquodoboit Valley
Dartmouth—Cole Harbour	Jason Cole; 7,331; 14.03%	Robert Chisholm; 12,757; 24.41%	Darren Fisher; 30,407; 58.17%	Brynn Nheiley; 1,775; 3.40%		Robert Chisholm
Halifax	Irvine Carvery; 4,564; 8.61%	Megan Leslie; 19,162; 36.13%	Andy Fillmore; 27,431; 51.73%	Thomas Trappenberg; 1,745; 3.29%	Allan Bezanson (M-L); 130; 0.25%	Megan Leslie
Halifax West	Michael McGinnis; 7,837; 15.65%	Joanne Hussey; 5,894; 11.77%	Geoff Regan; 34,377; 68.65%	Richard Henryk Zurawski; 1,971; 3.94%		Geoff Regan
Kings—Hants	David Morse; 8,677; 18.59%	Hugh Curry; 2,998; 6.42%	Scott Brison; 33,026; 70.74%	Will Cooper; 1,569; 3.36%	Megan Brown-Hodges (Rhino.); 184 0.39%	Scott Brison
Kings—Hants	David Morse; 8,677; 18.59%	Hugh Curry; 2,998; 6.42%	Scott Brison; 33,026; 70.74%	Will Cooper; 1,569; 3.36%	Edd Twohig (Ind.); 132 0.28%	Scott Brison
Kings—Hants	David Morse; 8,677; 18.59%	Hugh Curry; 2,998; 6.42%	Scott Brison; 33,026; 70.74%	Will Cooper; 1,569; 3.36%	Clifford James Williams (Ind.); 100 0.21%	Scott Brison
Sackville—Preston—Chezzetcook	Robert Thomas Strickland; 7,186; 14.88%	Peter Stoffer; 16,613; 34.39%	Darrell Samson; 23,161; 47.95%	Mike Montgomery; 1,341; 2.78%		Peter Stoffer; Sackville—Eastern Shore
South Shore—St. Margarets	Richard Clark; 11,905; 22.56%	Alex Godbold; 8,883; 16.83%	Bernadette Jordan; 30,045; 56.93%	Richard Biggar; 1,534; 2.91%	Ryan Barry (Comm.); 151 0.29%	Gerald Keddy†; South Shore—St. Margaret's
South Shore—St. Margarets	Richard Clark; 11,905; 22.56%	Alex Godbold; 8,883; 16.83%	Bernadette Jordan; 30,045; 56.93%	Richard Biggar; 1,534; 2.91%	Trevor Bruhm (Ind.); 257 0.49%	Gerald Keddy†; South Shore—St. Margaret's
Sydney—Victoria	John Douglas Chiasson; 4,360; 10.64%	Monika Dutt; 5,351; 13.06%	Mark Eyking; 29,995; 73.20%	Adrianna MacKinnon; 1,026; 2.50%	Wayne James Hiscock (Libert.); 242; 0.59%	Mark Eyking
West Nova	Arnold LeBlanc; 11,916; 26.09%	Greg Foster; 3,084; 6.75%	Colin Fraser; 28,775; 62.99%	Clark Walton; 1,904; 4.17%		Greg Kerr†

=== 2011 ===
Electoral district	Candidates					Incumbent
Electoral district	Conservative	Liberal	NDP	Green	Other	Incumbent
Cape Breton—Canso	Derrick Clarence Kennedy; 10,873; 30.65%	Rodger Cuzner; 16,478; 46.45%	Marney Jeanne Simmons; 6,984; 19.69%	Glen Carabin; 1,141; 3.22%		Rodger Cuzner
Central Nova	Peter G. McKay; 21,593; 56.79%	John R. Hamilton; 5,614; 14.76%	David K. Parker; 9,412; 24.75%	Matthew Chisholm; 1,406; 3.70%		Peter MacKay
Cumberland—Colchester—Musquodoboit Valley	Scott Armstrong; 21,041; 52.46%	Jim Burrows; 7,264; 18.11%	Wendy Robinson; 9,322; 23.24%	Jason Blanch; 2,109; 5.26%	Jim Hnatiuk (CHP); 375; 0.93%	Scott Armstrong
Dartmouth—Cole Harbour	Wanda Webber; 10,702; 24.76%	Mike Savage; 15,181; 35.12%	Robert Chisholm; 15,678; 36.27%	Paul Shreenan; 1,662; 3.85%		Mike Savage
Halifax	George Nikolaou; 8,276; 18.00%	Stan Kutcher; 11,793; 25.64%	Megan Leslie; 23,746; 51.63%	Michael Dewar; 2,020; 4.39%	Tony Seed (M-L); 152; 0.33%	Megan Leslie
Halifax West	Bruce Robert Pretty; 13,782; 30.50%	Geoff Regan; 16,230; 35.92%	Gregor Ash; 13,239; 29.30%	Thomas Trappenberg; 1,931; 4.27%		Geoff Regan
Kings—Hants	David Morse; 14,714; 36.63%	Scott Brison; 15,887; 39.56%	Mark Rogers; 8,043; 20.03%	Sheila Richardson; 1,520; 3.78%		Scott Brison
Sackville—Eastern Shore	Adam Mimnagh; 12,662; 30.45%	Scott Hemming; 4,673; 11.24%	Peter Stoffer; 22,483; 54.07%	John Percy; 1,762; 4.24%		Peter Stoffer
South Shore—St. Margaret's	Gerald Keddy; 17,948; 43.15%	Derek Wells; 7,037; 16.92%	Gordon Earle; 15,033; 36.14%	Kris MacLellan; 1,579; 3.80%		Gerald Keddy
Sydney—Victoria	Cecil Clarke; 14,023; 37.85%	Mark Eyking; 14,788; 39.91%	Kathy MacLeod; 7,049; 19.03%	Chris Milburn; 1,191; 3.21%		Mark Eyking
West Nova	Greg Kerr; 20,204; 47.04%	Robert Thibault; 15,632; 36.39%	George Barron; 5,631; 13.11%	Ross Johnson; 1,487; 3.46%		Greg Kerr

=== 2008 ===
Electoral district	Candidates					Incumbent
Electoral district	Conservative	Liberal	NDP	Green	Other	Incumbent
Cape Breton— Canso	Allan Richard Murphy; 8,524; 23.50%	Rodger Cuzner; 17,447; 48.10%	Mark MacNeill; 7,660; 21.12%	Dwayne MacEachern; 2,641; 7.28%		Rodger Cuzner
Central Nova	Peter Gordon MacKay; 18,240; 46.60%		Mary Louise Lorefice; 7,659; 19.57%	Elizabeth May; 12,620; 32.24%	Paul Kemp (CAP); 196 0.50%	Peter MacKay
Central Nova	Peter Gordon MacKay; 18,240; 46.60%		Mary Louise Lorefice; 7,659; 19.57%	Elizabeth May; 12,620; 32.24%	Michael Harris MacKay (CHP); 427 1.09%	Peter MacKay
Cumberland— Colchester— Musquodoboit Valley	Joel E. Bernard; 3,493; 8.83%	Tracy Parsons; 3,344; 8.45%	Karen Olsson; 4,874; 12.32%		Bill Casey (Ind.); 27,303 69.01%	Bill Casey
Cumberland— Colchester— Musquodoboit Valley	Joel E. Bernard; 3,493; 8.83%	Tracy Parsons; 3,344; 8.45%	Karen Olsson; 4,874; 12.32%		Rick Simpson (Ind.); 550 1.39%	Bill Casey
Dartmouth— Cole Harbour	Wanda Webber; 9,109; 22.46%	Mike Savage; 16,016; 39.49%	Brad Pye; 12,793; 31.55%	Paul Shreenan; 2,417; 5.96%	George Campbell (CHP); 219; 0.54%	Mike Savage
Halifax	Ted Larsen; 9,295; 20.61%	Catherine Meade; 12,458; 27.62%	Megan Leslie; 19,252; 42.69%	Darryl Whetter; 3,931; 8.72%	Tony Seed (M-L); 162; 0.36%	Alexa McDonough†
Halifax West	Rakesh Khosla; 8,708; 21.13%	Geoff Regan; 17,129; 41.56%	Tamara Lorincz; 12,201; 29.60%	Michael Munday; 2,920; 7.08%	Trevor Ennis (CHP); 257; 0.62%	Geoff Regan
Kings—Hants	Rosemary Segado; 9,846; 26.15%	Scott Brison; 16,641; 44.19%	Carol E. Harris; 8,291; 22.02%	Brendan MacNeill; 2,353; 6.25%	Jim Hnatiuk (CHP); 528; 1.40%	Scott Brison
Sackville— Eastern; Shore	David Montgomery; 8,198; 20.74%	Carolyn Scott; 5,018; 12.69%	Peter Stoffer; 24,279; 61.42%	Noreen Hartlen; 2,034; 5.15%		Peter Stoffer
South; Shore—St. Margaret's	Gerald Keddy; 14,388; 35.99%	Bill Smith; 9,536; 23.85%	Gordon S. Earle; 13,456; 33.65%	Michael Oddy; 2,090; 5.23%	Joe Larkin (CHP); 513; 1.28%	Gerald Keddy
Sydney— Victoria	Kristen Rudderham; 7,223; 20.62%	Mark Eyking; 17,303; 49.40%	Wayne McKay; 8,559; 24.44%	Collin Harker; 1,941; 5.54%		Mark Eyking
West Nova	Greg Kerr; 16,779; 39.94%	Robert Thibault; 15,185; 36.15%	George Barron; 7,097; 16.89%	Ronald Mills; 2,106; 5.01%	Cindy M. Nesbitt (Ind.); 844; 2.01%	Robert Thibault

=== 2006 ===
All incumbent MPs in Nova Scotia were re-elected. There were six Liberal, three Conservatives and two NDP MPs in the province.

Electoral district	Candidates					Incumbent
Electoral district	Liberal	Conservative	NDP	Green	Other	Incumbent
Cape Breton—Canso	Rodger Cuzner; 21,424; 53.19%	Kenzie MacNeil; 9,740; 24.18%	Hector Morrison; 8,111; 20.14%	Rob Hines; 1,006; 2.5%		Rodger Cuzner
Central Nova	Dan Walsh; 10,349; 24.56%	Peter G. MacKay; 17,134; 40.66%	Alexis MacDonald; 13,861; 32.89%	David Orton; 671; 1.59%	Allan H. Bezanson (M-L); 124; 0.29%	Peter MacKay
Cumberland—Colchester— Musquodoboit Valley	Gary Richard; 10,299; 23.89%	Bill Casey; 22,439; 52.04%	Margaret Sagar; 8,944; 20.74%	N. Bruce Farrell; 910; 2.11%	Rick Simpson (Ind.); 524; 1.22%	Bill Casey
Dartmouth—Cole Harbour	Mike Savage; 19,027; 42.32%	Robert A. Campbell; 10,259; 22.82%	Peter Mancini; 14,612; 32.50%	Elizabeth Perry; 1,005; 2.24%	Charles Spurr (M-L); 56; 0.12%	Michael Savage
Halifax	Martin MacKinnon; 15,437; 30.90%	Andrew House; 8,993; 18.00%	Alexa McDonough; 23,420; 46.88%	Nick Wright; 1,948; 3.90%	Tony Seed (M-L); 164; 0.33%	Alexa McDonough
Halifax West	Geoff Regan; 21,818; 49.36%	Rakesh Khosla; 10,184; 23.04%	Alan Hill; 10,798; 24.43%	Thomas Trappenberg; 1,406; 3.18%		Geoff Regan
Kings—Hants	Scott Brison; 19,491; 45.56%	Bob Mullan; 13,772; 32.19%	Mary DeWolfe; 8,138; 19.02%	Sheila Richardson; 947; 2.21%	Chummy Anthony (Mar.); 436; 1.02%	Scott Brison
Sackville—Eastern Shore	Bill Fleming; 9,921; 22.99%	Paul Francis; 9,450; 21.90%	Peter Stoffer; 22,848; 52.95%	Richard MacDonald; 933; 2.16%		Peter Stoffer
South Shore—St. Margaret's	Darian Malcom Huskilson; 11,629; 28.36%	Gerald Gordon Keddy; 15,108; 36.85%	Gordon S. Earle; 11,689; 28.51%	Katie Morris Boudreau; 1,198; 2.92%	James Hnatiuk (CHP); 1,376; 3.36%	Gerald Keddy
Sydney—Victoria	Mark Eyking; 20,277; 49.88%	Howie MacDonald; 7,455; 18.34%	John Hugh Edwards; 11,587; 28.50%	Chris Milburn; 1,336; 3.29%		Mark Eyking
West Nova	Robert Thibault; 17,734; 39.24%	Greg Kerr; 17,222; 38.11%	Arthur Bull; 8,512; 18.84%	Matthew Granger; 1,040; 2.30%	Ken Griffiths (Ind.); 682; 1.51%	Robert Thibault

=== 2004 ===
With Toronto's Jack Layton replacing Alexa McDonough as leader, the NDP saw its hold on the Halifax Region slip somewhat, losing Dartmouth. The Liberals, after having gained MP Scott Brison from the Progressive Conservatives in 2003, held Kings-Hants. A hoped-for breakthrough for the Conservatives remained elusive.

Electoral district	Candidates					Incumbent
Electoral district	Liberal	Conservative	NDP	Green	Other	Incumbent
Cape Breton—Canso	Rodger Cuzner; 20,139; 53.26%	Kenzie MacNeil; 7,654; 20.24%	Shirley Hartery; 9,197; 24.32%	Seumas Gibson; 820; 2.17%		Rodger Cuzner
Central Nova	Susan L. Green; 9,986; 26.39%	Peter G. MacKay; 16,376; 43.27%	Alexis MacDonald; 10,470; 27.66%	Rebecca Mosher; 1,015; 2.68%		Peter MacKay
Dartmouth—Cole Harbour	Mike Savage; 17,425; 42.07%	Mike MacDonald; 8,739; 21.10%	Susan MacAlpine-Gillis; 13,463; 32.50%	Michael Marshall; 1,311; 3.16%	Tracy Parsons (PC); 415 1.00%	Wendy Lill†
Dartmouth—Cole Harbour	Mike Savage; 17,425; 42.07%	Mike MacDonald; 8,739; 21.10%	Susan MacAlpine-Gillis; 13,463; 32.50%	Michael Marshall; 1,311; 3.16%	Charles Spurr (M-L); 70 0.17%	Wendy Lill†
Halifax	Sheila Fougere; 17,267; 39.11%	Kevin Leslie Keefe; 6,457; 14.63%	Alexa McDonough; 18,341; 41.55%	Michael Oddy; 2,081; 4.71%		Alexa McDonough
Halifax West	Geoff Regan; 19,083; 47.50%	Ken MacPhee; 8,413; 20.94%	Bill Carr; 11,228; 27.95%	Martin Willison; 1,452; 3.61%		Geoff Regan
Kings—Hants	Scott Brison; 17,555; 46.61%	Bob Mullan; 11,344; 30.12%	Skip Hambling; 6,663; 17.69%	Kevin Stacey; 1,364; 3.62%	Richard Hennigar (Ind.); 242 0.64%	Scott Brison (Note: Brison defected from the Progressive Conservative caucus in December 2003.)
Kings—Hants	Scott Brison; 17,555; 46.61%	Bob Mullan; 11,344; 30.12%	Skip Hambling; 6,663; 17.69%	Kevin Stacey; 1,364; 3.62%	Jim Hnatiuk (CHP); 493 1.31%	Scott Brison
North Nova	Dianne Brushett; 10,591; 26.49%	Bill Casey; 20,188; 50.49%	Margaret E. Sagar; 7,560; 18.91%	Sheila G. Richardson; 1,245; 3.11%	Jack Moors (PC); 399; 1.00%	Bill Casey
Sackville—Eastern Shore	Dale Stevens; 11,222; 28.66%	Steve Streatch; 8,363; 21.35%	Peter Stoffer; 17,925; 45.77%	David Fullerton; 1,007; 2.57%	Greg Moors (PC); 645; 1.65%	Peter Stoffer
South Shore—St. Margaret's	John Chandler; 12,658; 32.08%	Gerald Keddy; 14,954; 37.90%	Gordon Earle; 10,140; 25.70%	Katie Morris Boudreau; 1,700; 4.31%		Gerald Keddy
Sydney—Victoria	Mark Eyking; 19,372; 52.13%	Howie MacDonald; 5,897; 15.87%	John Hugh Edwards; 10,298; 27.71%	Chris Milburn; 855; 2.30%	B. Chris Gallant (Ind.); 264 0.71%	Mark Eyking
Sydney—Victoria	Mark Eyking; 19,372; 52.13%	Howie MacDonald; 5,897; 15.87%	John Hugh Edwards; 10,298; 27.71%	Chris Milburn; 855; 2.30%	Cathy Thériault (Mar.); 474 1.28%	Mark Eyking
West Nova	Robert Thibault; 18,343; 42.64%	Jon Charles Carey; 14,209; 33.03%	Edmund Arthur Bull; 9,086; 21.12%	Matthew Granger; 1,385; 3.22%		Robert Thibault

==== Maps ====
1. Cape Breton-Canso
2. Central Nova
3. Dartmouth-Cole Harbour
4. Halifax
5. Halifax West
6. Kings-Hants
7. North Nova
8. Sackville-Eastern Shore
9. South Shore-St. Margaret's
10. Sydney-Victoria
11. West Nova
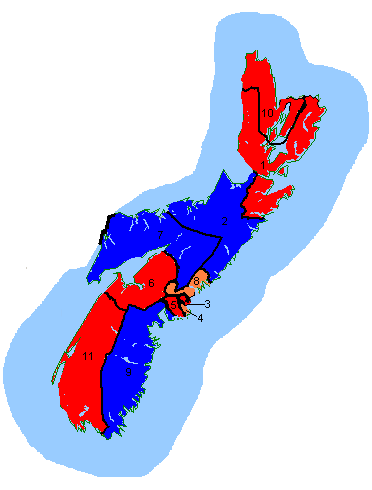
Key map

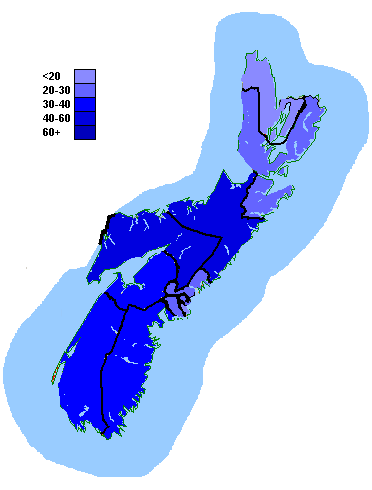
Conservative Party of Canada

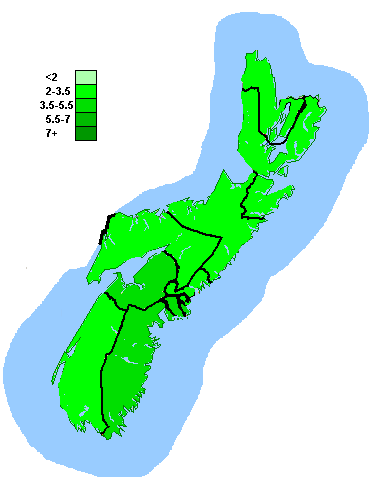
Green Party of Canada

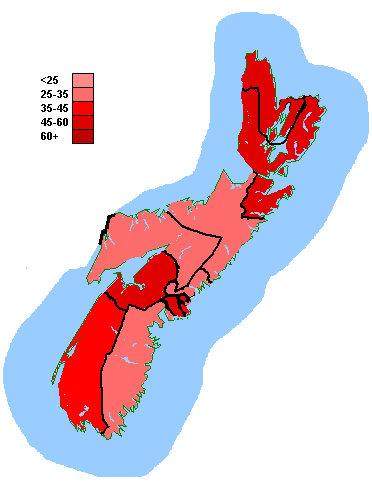
Liberal Party of Canada

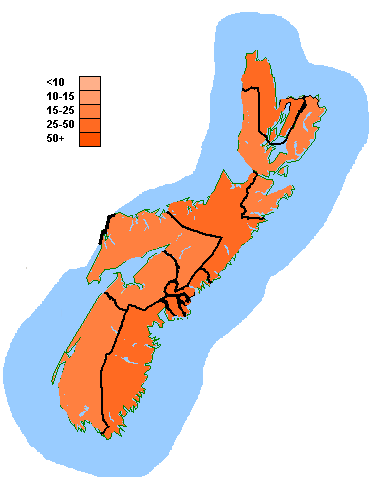
New Democratic Party

=== 2000 ===
Electoral district	Candidates					Incumbent
Electoral district	Liberal	Canadian Alliance	NDP	PC	Other	Incumbent
Bras d'Or—Cape Breton	Rodger Cuzner; 20,815; 54.85%	John M. Currie; 1,483; 3.91%	Michelle Dockrill; 7,537; 19.86%	Alfie MacLeod; 8,114; 21.38%		Michelle Dockrill
Cumberland—Colchester	Dianne Brushett; 10,271; 26.61%	Bryden Ryan; 4,981; 12.91%	James Arthur Harpell; 4,629; 11.99%	Bill Casey; 18,716; 48.49%		Bill Casey
Dartmouth	Bernie Boudreau; 12,408; 33.14%	Jordi Morgan; 3,282; 8.76%	Wendy Lill; 13,585; 36.28%	Tom McInnis; 8,085; 21.59%	Charles Spurr (M-L); 86; 0.23%	Wendy Lill
Halifax	Kevin Little; 13,539; 32.99%	Amery Boyer; 2,348; 5.72%	Alexa McDonough; 16,563; 40.36%	Paul Fitzgibbons; 7,255; 17.68%	Kevin Dumont Corkill (M-L); 113 0.28% Michael G. Oddy (Green); 590 1.44% Mike Patriquen (Mar.); 627 1.53%	Alexa McDonough
Halifax West	Geoff Regan; 18,327; 39.21%	Hilda Stevens; 4,531; 9.70%	Gordon Earle; 14,016; 29.99%	Charles Cirtwill; 9,701; 20.76%	Tony Seed (M-L); 160; 0.34%	Gordon Earle
Kings—Hants	Claude O'Hara; 13,213; 30.23%	Gerry Fulton; 4,618; 10.56%	Kaye Johnson; 7,244; 16.57%	Scott Brison; 17,612; 40.29%	Richard Hennigar (NLP); 133 0.30% Jim King (Mar.); 669 1.53% Graham Jake MacDonald (Comm.); 85 0.19% Kenneth MacEachern (Ind.); 140 0.32%	Joe Clark (Note: Clark won seat in 2000 byelection; originally held by Scott Brison. Clark sought re-election in Calgary Centre.)
Pictou—Antigonish—Guysborough	Raymond Mason; 12,585; 31.57%	Harvey Henderson; 2,930; 7.35%	Wendy Panagopoulos; 4,498; 11.28%	Peter G. MacKay; 19,298; 48.41%	Darryl Gallivan (Ind.); 552; 1.38%	Peter MacKay
Sackville—Musquodoboit Valley—Eastern Shore	Bruce Stephen; 12,864; 32.56%	Bill Stevens; 4,773; 12.08%	Peter Stoffer; 13,619; 34.48%	Wade Marshall; 7,589; 19.21%	Melanie Patriquen (Mar.); 658; 1.67%	Peter Stoffer
South Shore	Derek Wells; 12,677; 35.12%	Evan Walters; 4,697; 13.01%	Bill Zimmerman; 4,394; 12.17%	Gerald Keddy; 14,328; 39.69%		Gerald Keddy
Sydney—Victoria	Mark Eyking; 19,388; 49.83%	Rod A. M. Farrell; 1,528; 3.93%	Peter Mancini; 14,216; 36.53%	Anna Curtis-Steele; 3,779; 9.71%		Peter Mancini
West Nova	Robert Thibault; 12,783; 36.09%	Mike Donaldson; 6,581; 18.58%	Phil Roberts; 3,976; 11.23%	Mark Muise; 12,080; 34.11%		Mark Muise
