= Liberal Party of Canada candidates in the 2019 Canadian federal election =

Candidates for the Liberal Party of Canada took part in all the 338 electoral districts in the 2019 Canadian federal election. 157 of them won their seat, giving Justin Trudeau's party a plurality in the new House of Commons which formed a minority government.

== Candidate statistics ==
Candidates Nominated	Male Candidates	Female Candidates	Most Common Occupation
338	88	42	

== Newfoundland and Labrador - 7 seats ==
Riding	Candidate's Name	Notes	Gender	Residence	Occupation	Votes	%	Rank	Ref.
Avalon	Kenneth McDonald	Incumbent Member of Parliament	M	Conception Bay South	Small business owner	19,122	46.26	1	
Bonavista—Burin—Trinity	Churence Rogers	Incumbent Member of Parliament	M	Centreville-Wareham-Trinity	Educator	14,707	45.70	1	
Coast of Bays—Central—Notre Dame	Scott Simms	Incumbent Member of Parliament	M	Norris Arm	Broadcaster, Journalist	16,514	48.31	1	
Labrador	Yvonne Jones	Incumbent Member of Parliament	F	Mary's Harbour	Entrepreneur, Journalist	4,851	42.48	1	
Long Range Mountains	Gudie Hutchings	Incumbent Member of Parliament	F	Corner Brook	Businesswoman	18,199	47.36	1	
St. John's East	Nick Whalen	Incumbent Member of Parliament	M	St. John's	Lawyer	14,962	33.20	2	
St. John's South—Mount Pearl	Seamus O'Regan	Incumbent Member of Parliament	M	St. John's	Broadcaster	20,793	51.13	1	

== Prince Edward Island - 4 seats ==
Riding	Candidate's Name	Notes	Gender	Residence	Occupation	Votes	%	Rank	Ref.
Cardigan	Lawrence MacAulay	Incumbent Member of Parliament, Minister of Veterans Affairs	M	St. Peters Bay	Farmer	10,939	49.35	1	
Charlottetown	Sean Casey	Incumbent Member of Parliament	M	Charlottetown	Lawyer	8,812	44.26	1	
Egmont	Bobby Morrissey	Incumbent Member of Parliament	M	Tignish	Businessman	8,016	39.73	1	
Malpeque	Wayne Easter	Incumbent Member of Parliament	M	North Wiltshire	Farmer	9,533	41.38	1	

== Nova Scotia - 11 seats ==
Riding	Candidate's Name	Notes	Gender	Residence	Occupation	Votes	%	Rank	Ref.
Cape Breton—Canso	Mike Kelloway		M	Glace Bay	Senior manager	16,694	38.88	1	
Central Nova	Sean Fraser	Incumbent Member of Parliament	M	New Glasgow	Lawyer	20,718	46.59	1	
Cumberland—Colchester	Lenore Zann	Member of the Nova Scotia House of Assembly for Truro-Bible Hill-Millbrook-Salmon River	F	Truro	Actress	16,672	36.68	1	
Dartmouth—Cole Harbour	Darren Fisher	Incumbent Member of Parliament	M	Dartmouth	Businessman	24,259	45.34	1	
Halifax	Andy Fillmore	Incumbent Member of Parliament	M	Halifax	Architect	23,681	42.48	1	
Halifax West	Geoff Regan	Incumbent Member of Parliament, Speaker of the House of Commons	M	Bedford	Lawyer	26,885	49.46	1	
Kings—Hants	Kody Blois		M	Belnan	Lawyer	20,806	43.31	1	
Sackville—Preston—Chezzetcook	Darrell Samson	Incumbent Member of Parliament	M	Fall River	Educator	19,925	40.22	1	
South Shore—St. Margarets	Bernadette Jordan	Incumbent Member of Parliament, Minister of Rural Economic Development	F	West Dublin	Fundraiser	21,886	41.67	1	
Sydney—Victoria	Jaime Battiste		M	Eskasoni	Lawyer	12,536	30.90	1	
West Nova	Jason Deveau		M	Clare	Policy analyst	17,025	36.38	2	

== New Brunswick - 10 seats ==
Riding	Candidate's Name	Notes	Gender	Residence	Occupation	Votes	%	Rank	Ref.
Acadie—Bathurst	Serge Cormier	Incumbent Member of Parliament	M	Maisonnette	Policy analyst	26,547	55.14	1	
Beauséjour	Dominic LeBlanc	Incumbent Member of Parliament, Minister of Intergovernmental and Northern Affairs and Internal Trade	M	Grande-Digue	Lawyer	24,948	46.47	1	
Fredericton	Matt DeCourcey	Incumbent Member of Parliament	M	Fredericton	Youth advocate	13,544	27.41	3	
Fundy Royal	Alaina Lockhart	Incumbent Member of Parliament	F	Sussex	Business owner	12,433	25.56	2	
Madawaska—Restigouche	René Arseneault	Incumbent Member of Parliament	M	Balmora	Lawyer	17,331	50.28	1	
Miramichi—Grand Lake	Pat Finnigan	Incumbent Member of Parliament	M	Rogersville	Businessman	12,722	36.77	1	
Moncton—Riverview—Dieppe	Ginette Petitpas Taylor	Incumbent Member of Parliament, Minister of Health	F	Dieppe	Social worker	22,261	42.95	1	
New Brunswick Southwest	Karen Ludwig	Incumbent Member of Parliament	F	Fredericton	Educator	10,110	25.54	2	
Saint John—Rothesay	Wayne Long	Incumbent Member of Parliament	M	Saint John	Hockey club president	15,443	37.43	1	
Tobique—Mactaquac	Kelsey MacDonald		F	Grand Falls	Policy analyst	9,631	25.21	2	

== Quebec - 78 seats ==
=== Eastern Quebec ===
Riding	Candidate's Name	Notes	Gender	Residence	Occupation	Votes	%	Rank	Ref.
Avignon—La Mitis—Matane—Matapédia	Rémi Massé	Incumbent Member of Parliament	M	Bas-Saint-Laurent	Public servant	12,188	33.89	2	
Bellechasse—Les Etchemins—Lévis	Laurence Harvey		F	Lévis	Policy analyst	10,734	16.66	3	
Gaspésie—Les Îles-de-la-Madeleine	Diane Lebouthillier	Incumbent Member of Parliament, Minister of National Revenue	F	Sainte-Thérèse-de-Gaspé	Social worker	16,296	42.46	1	
Montmagny—L'Islet—Kamouraska—Rivière-du-Loup	Aladin Legault d'Auteuil		M			8,210	16.29	3	
Rimouski-Neigette—Témiscouata—Les Basques	Chantal Pilon		F			10,095	22.06	3	

=== Côte-Nord and Saguenay ===
Riding	Candidate's Name	Notes	Gender	Residence	Occupation	Votes	%	Rank	Ref.
Beauport—Côte-de-Beaupré—Île d'Orléans—Charlevoix	Manon Fortin		F	Beauport	Executive director	10,608	20.95	3	
Chicoutimi—Le Fjord	Dajana Dautovic		F			7,504	17.10	3	
Jonquière	Vincent Garneau		M		Public servant, Chief of Staff to the Minister of Foreign Affairs	7,849	15.90	4	
Lac-Saint-Jean	Richard Hébert	Incumbent Member of Parliament	M	Dolbeau-Mistassini	Entrepreneur	13,633	25.14	2	
Manicouagan	Dave Savard		M		Educator	7,793	19.29	2	

=== Quebec City ===
Riding	Candidate's Name	Notes	Gender	Residence	Occupation	Votes	%	Rank	Ref.
Beauport—Limoilou	Antoine Bujold	2015 candidate in the riding	M	Boischatel	Restaurateur	13,020	25.94	3	
Charlesbourg—Haute-Saint-Charles	René-Paul Coly		M			12,584	21.29	3	
Louis-Hébert	Joël Lightbound	Incumbent Member of Parliament	M	Quebec City	Lawyer	25,140	40.51	1	
Louis-Saint-Laurent	Jean-Christophe Cusson		M	Lac-Beauport	Public servant	13,571	20.70	3	
Québec	Jean-Yves Duclos	Incumbent Member of Parliament, Minister of Families, Children and Social Development	M	Quebec City	Economist, professor	18,047	33.30	1	

=== Central Quebec ===
Riding	Candidate's Name	Notes	Gender	Residence	Occupation	Votes	%	Rank	Ref.
Bécancour—Nicolet—Saurel									
Berthier—Maskinongé									
Joliette									
Lévis—Lotbinière									
Montcalm									
Portneuf—Jacques-Cartier									
Repentigny									
Saint-Maurice—Champlain									
Trois-Rivières									

=== Eastern Townships ===
Riding	Candidate's Name	Notes	Gender	Residence	Occupation	Votes	%	Rank	Ref.
Beauce									
Brome—Missisquoi									
Compton—Stanstead									
Drummond									
Mégantic—L'Érable									
Richmond—Arthabaska									
Saint-Hyacinthe—Bagot									
Shefford									
Sherbrooke									

=== Montérégie ===
Riding	Candidate's Name	Notes	Gender	Residence	Occupation	Votes	%	Rank	Ref.
Beloeil—Chambly									
Brossard—Saint-Lambert									
Châteauguay—Lacolle									
La Prairie									
Longueuil—Charles-LeMoyne									
Longueuil—Saint-Hubert									
Montarville									
Pierre-Boucher—Les Patriotes—Verchères									
Saint-Jean									
Salaberry—Suroît									
Vaudreuil—Soulanges									

=== Eastern Montreal ===
Riding	Candidate's Name	Notes	Gender	Residence	Occupation	Votes	%	Rank	Ref.
Hochelaga									
Honoré-Mercier									
La Pointe-de-l'Île									
Laurier—Sainte-Marie									
Rosemont—La Petite-Patrie									

=== Western Montreal ===
Riding	Candidate's Name	Notes	Gender	Residence	Occupation	Votes	%	Rank	Ref.
Dorval—Lachine—LaSalle									
Lac-Saint-Louis									
LaSalle—Émard—Verdun									
Mount Royal									
Notre-Dame-de-Grâce—Westmount									
Outremont									
Pierrefonds—Dollard									
Saint-Laurent									
Ville-Marie—Le Sud-Ouest—Île-des-Sœurs									

=== Northern Montreal and Laval ===
Riding	Candidate's Name	Notes	Gender	Residence	Occupation	Votes	%	Rank	Ref.
Ahuntsic-Cartierville									
Alfred-Pellan									
Bourassa									
Laval—Les Îles									
Marc-Aurèle-Fortin									
Papineau									
Saint-Léonard—Saint-Michel									
Vimy									

=== Laurentides, Outaouais and Northern Quebec ===
Riding	Candidate's Name	Notes	Gender	Residence	Occupation	Votes	%	Rank	Ref.
Abitibi—Baie-James—Nunavik—Eeyou									
Abitibi—Témiscamingue									
Argenteuil—La Petite-Nation									
Gatineau									
Hull—Aylmer									
Laurentides—Labelle									
Mirabel									
Pontiac									
Rivière-des-Mille-Îles									
Rivière-du-Nord									
Terrebonne									
Thérèse-De Blainville									

== Ontario - 121 seats ==
=== Ottawa ===
Riding	Candidate's Name	Notes	Gender	Residence	Occupation	Votes	%	Rank	Ref.
Carleton	Chris Rodgers		M	Metcalfe	Public servant	26,518	38.23	2	
Kanata—Carleton	Karen McCrimmon	Incumbent Member of Parliament	F	Woodlawn	Mediator, Ret. RCAF Leutenient-Colonel	28,746	43.05	1	
Nepean	Chandra Arya	Incumbent Member of Parliament	M	Barrhaven		31,933	45.89	1	
Orléans	Marie-France Lalonde	Member of the Ontario Provincial Parliament for Orléans	F	Notting Gate	Businesswomen, social worker	44,183	54.27	1	
Ottawa Centre	Catherine McKenna	Incumbent Member of Parliament, Minister of Environment and Climate Change	F	The Glebe	Lawyer	38,391	48.66	1	
Ottawa South	David McGuinty	Incumbent Member of Parliament	M	Playfair Park	Businessman, lawyer	34,205	52.32	1	
Ottawa—Vanier	Mona Fortier	Incumbent Member of Parliament	F	Beacon Hill		32,679	51.16	1	
Ottawa West—Nepean	Anita Vandenbeld	Incumbent Member of Parliament	F	Belltown		28,378	45.62	1	

=== Eastern Ontario ===
Riding	Candidate's Name	Notes	Gender	Residence	Occupation	Votes	%	Rank	Ref.
Bay of Quinte	Neil Ellis	Incumbent Member of Parliament	M	Belleville	Businessman	24,099	39.16	1	
Glengarry—Prescott—Russell	Francis Drouin	Incumbent Member of Parliament	M	Russell	Consultant	31,293	47.56	1	
Hastings—Lennox and Addington	Mike Bossio	Incumbent Member of Parliament	M	Marysville	Consultant	19,721	37.14	2	
Kingston and the Islands	Mark Gerretsen	Incumbent Member of Parliament	M	Kingston	Property manager	31,205	45.76	1	
Lanark—Frontenac—Kingston	Kayley Kennedy		F	Ottawa	Political assistant, student	15,441	24.71	2	
Leeds—Grenville—Thousand Islands and Rideau Lakes	Josh Bennett		M	Prescott	Market research	15,482	26.49	2	
Renfrew—Nipissing—Pembroke	Ruben Marini		M		Engineer	11,532	19.56	2	
Stormont—Dundas—South Glengarry	Heather Megill		F	Cornwall	Teacher, union organizer	13,767	25.63	2	

=== Central Ontario ===
Riding	Candidate's Name	Notes	Gender	Residence	Occupation	Votes	%	Rank	Ref.
Barrie—Innisfil									
Barrie—Springwater—Oro-Medonte									
Bruce—Grey—Owen Sound									
Dufferin—Caledon									
Haliburton—Kawartha Lakes—Brock									
Northumberland—Peterborough South									
Peterborough—Kawartha									
Simcoe—Grey									
Simcoe North									
York—Simcoe									

=== Durham and York ===
Riding	Candidate's Name	Notes	Gender	Residence	Occupation	Votes	%	Rank	Ref.
Ajax									
Aurora—Oak Ridges—Richmond Hill									
Durham									
King—Vaughan									
Markham—Stouffville									
Markham—Thornhill									
Markham—Unionville									
Newmarket—Aurora									
Oshawa									
Pickering—Uxbridge									
Richmond Hill									
Thornhill									
Vaughan—Woodbridge									
Whitby									

=== Suburban Toronto ===
Riding	Candidate's Name	Notes	Gender	Residence	Occupation	Votes	%	Rank	Ref.
Don Valley East									
Don Valley North									
Etobicoke Centre									
Etobicoke—Lakeshore									
Etobicoke North									
Humber River—Black Creek									
Scarborough—Agincourt									
Scarborough Centre									
Scarborough-Guildwood									
Scarborough North									
Scarborough—Rouge Park									
Scarborough Southwest									
Willowdale									
York Centre									

=== Central Toronto ===
Riding	Candidate's Name	Notes	Gender	Residence	Occupation	Votes	%	Rank	Ref.
Beaches—East York									
Davenport									
Don Valley West									
Eglinton—Lawrence									
Parkdale—High Park									
Spadina—Fort York									
Toronto Centre									
Toronto—Danforth									
Toronto—St. Paul's									
University—Rosedale									
York South—Weston									

=== Brampton, Mississauga and Oakville ===
Riding	Candidate's Name	Notes	Gender	Residence	Occupation	Votes	%	Rank	Ref.
Brampton Centre									
Brampton East									
Brampton North									
Brampton South									
Brampton West									
Mississauga Centre									
Mississauga East—Cooksville									
Mississauga—Erin Mills									
Mississauga—Lakeshore									
Mississauga—Malton									
Mississauga—Streetsville									
Oakville									
Oakville North—Burlington									

=== Hamilton, Burlington and Niagara ===
Riding	Candidate's Name	Notes	Gender	Residence	Occupation	Votes	%	Rank	Ref.
Burlington									
Flamborough—Glanbrook									
Hamilton Centre									
Hamilton East—Stoney Creek									
Hamilton Mountain									
Hamilton West—Ancaster—Dundas									
Milton									
Niagara Centre									
Niagara Falls									
Niagara West									
St. Catharines									

=== Midwestern Ontario ===
Riding	Candidate's Name	Notes	Gender	Residence	Occupation	Votes	%	Rank	Ref.
Brantford—Brant									
Cambridge									
Guelph									
Haldimand—Norfolk									
Huron—Bruce									
Kitchener Centre									
Kitchener—Conestoga									
Kitchener South—Hespeler									
Oxford									
Perth Wellington									
Waterloo									
Wellington—Halton Hills									

=== Southwestern Ontario ===
Riding	Candidate's Name	Notes	Gender	Residence	Occupation	Votes	%	Rank	Ref.
Chatham-Kent—Leamington									
Elgin—Middlesex—London									
Essex									
Lambton—Kent—Middlesex									
London—Fanshawe									
London North Centre									
London West									
Sarnia—Lambton									
Windsor—Tecumseh									
Windsor West									

=== Northern Ontario ===
Riding	Candidate's Name	Notes	Gender	Residence	Occupation	Votes	%	Rank	Ref.
Algoma—Manitoulin—Kapuskasing									
Kenora									
Nickel Belt									
Nipissing—Timiskaming									
Parry Sound-Muskoka									
Sault Ste. Marie									
Sudbury									
Thunder Bay—Rainy River									
Thunder Bay—Superior North									
Timmins-James Bay									

== Manitoba - 14 seats ==
=== Rural Manitoba ===
Riding	Candidate's Name	Notes	Gender	Residence	Occupation	Votes	%	Rank	Ref.
Brandon—Souris	Terry Hayward	2011, 2013 by-election and 2015 candidate in Provencher	M	Anola	Public servant	4,972	12.07	3	
Churchill—Keewatinook Aski	Judy Klassen	Former member of the Legislative Assembly of Manitoba for Keewatinook and interim leader of the Manitoba Liberal Party	F	St. Theresa Point		5,616	23.71	2	
Dauphin—Swan River—Neepawa	Cathy Scofield-Singh		F			5,344	13.17	3	
Portage—Lisgar	Ken Werbiski	2015 candidate in the riding	M	Portage la Prairie	Optician, nurse	4,779	10.71	2	
Provencher	Trevor Kirczenow	First openly transgender candidate for a major Canadian political party.	M	Dugald	Author, researcher	6,347	13.14	2	
Selkirk—Interlake—Eastman	Detlev Regelsky		M	Argyle	Union leader	6,003	12.10	3	

=== Winnipeg ===
Riding	Candidate's Name	Notes	Gender	Residence	Occupation	Votes	%	Rank	Ref.
Charleswood—St. James—Assiniboia—Headingley	Doug Eyolfson	Incumbent Member of Parliament	M	Winnipeg	Physician	16,398	35.47	2	
Elmwood—Transcona	Jennifer Malabar		F	Winnipeg	Lawyer	5,346	12.33	3	
Kildonan—St. Paul	MaryAnn Mihychuk	Incumbent Member of Parliament	F	Winnipeg	Geoscientist	12,356	27.89	2	
Saint Boniface—Saint Vital	Dan Vandal	Incumbent Member of Parliament	M	Winnipeg	Social worker	20,300	42.88	1	
Winnipeg Centre	Robert-Falcon Ouellette	Incumbent Member of Parliament	M	Winnipeg	University of Manitoba Aboriginal Focus Program Director	10,704	33.74	2	
Winnipeg North	Kevin Lamoureux	Incumbent Member of Parliament	M	Winnipeg	Air traffic controller	15,581	47.60	1	
Winnipeg South	Terry Duguid	Incumbent Member of Parliament	M	Winnipeg	Community activist	20,182	42.14	1	
Winnipeg South Centre	Jim Carr	Incumbent Member of Parliament, Minister of International Trade Diversification	M	Winnipeg	Businessman	22,799	45.00	1	

== Saskatchewan - 14 seats ==
=== Southern Saskatchewan ===
Riding	Candidate's Name	Notes	Gender	Residence	Occupation	Votes	%	Rank	Ref.
Cypress Hills—Grasslands	William Caton		M		Cattle rancher	1,595	4.15	3	
Moose Jaw—Lake Centre—Lanigan	Cecilia Melanson		F		Graphic designer, notary public	2,517	5.60	3	
Regina—Lewvan	Winter Fedyk		F	Regina	Civil servant	6,826	13.23	3	
Regina—Qu'Appelle	Jordan Ames-Sinclair		M	Regina	Student	4,543	11.72	3	
Regina—Wascana	Ralph Goodale	Incumbent Member of Parliament, Minister of Public Safety and Emergency Preparedness	M	Regina	Business executive, lawyer	15,242	33.61	2	
Souris—Moose Mountain	Javin Ames-Sinclair		M	Regina	Student	1,718	4.13	3	
Yorkton—Melville	Connor Moen		M		Party staffer	2,488	6.42	3	

=== Northern Saskatchewan ===
Riding	Candidate's Name	Notes	Gender	Residence	Occupation	Votes	%	Rank	Ref.
Battlefords—Lloydminster	Larry Ingram				Small business owner	2,426	6.77	3	
Carlton Trail—Eagle Creek	Rebecca Malo				Student	2,085	4.64	3	
Desnethé—Missinippi—Churchill River	Tammy Cook-Searson				Politician	7,225	26.51	3	
Prince Albert	Estelle Hjertaas				Lawyer	4,107	10.34	3	
Saskatoon—Grasswood	Tracy Muggli				Social worker	8,419	17.03	3	
Saskatoon—University	Susan Hayton				Physician	6,146	13.07	3	
Saskatoon West	Shah Rukh					2,863	7.34	3	

== Alberta - 34 seats ==
=== Rural Alberta ===
Riding	Candidate's Name	Notes	Gender	Residence	Occupation	Votes	%	Rank	Ref.
Banff—Airdrie									
Battle River—Crowfoot									
Bow River									
Foothills									
Fort McMurray—Cold Lake									
Grande Prairie-Mackenzie									
Lakeland									
Lethbridge									
Medicine Hat—Cardston—Warner									
Peace River—Westlock									
Red Deer—Lacombe									
Red Deer—Mountain View									
Yellowhead									

=== Edmonton and environs ===
Riding	Candidate's Name	Notes	Gender	Residence	Occupation	Votes	%	Rank	Ref.
Edmonton Centre									
Edmonton Griesbach									
Edmonton Manning									
Edmonton Mill Woods									
Edmonton Riverbend									
Edmonton Strathcona									
Edmonton West									
Edmonton—Wetaskiwin									
St. Albert—Edmonton									
Sherwood Park—Fort Saskatchewan									
Sturgeon River—Parkland									

=== Calgary ===
Riding	Candidate's Name	Notes	Gender	Residence	Occupation	Votes	%	Rank	Ref.
Calgary Centre									
Calgary Confederation									
Calgary Forest Lawn									
Calgary Heritage									
Calgary Midnapore									
Calgary Nose Hill									
Calgary Rocky Ridge									
Calgary Shepard									
Calgary Signal Hill									
Calgary Skyview									

== British Columbia - 42 seats ==
=== BC Interior ===
Riding	Candidate's Name	Notes	Gender	Residence	Occupation	Votes	%	Rank	Ref.
Cariboo—Prince George	Tracy Calogheros	2015 candidate in the riding	F	Prince George	Museum CEO	10,932	19.96	2	
Central Okanagan—Similkameen—Nicola	Mary Ann Murphy		F	West Kelowna	Professor	16,252	25.03	2	
Kamloops—Thompson—Cariboo	Terry Lake	Former member of the British Columbia Legislative Assembly for Kamloops-North Thompson	M	Kamloops	Veterinarian	19,716	27.21	2	
Kelowna—Lake Country	Stephen Fuhr	Incumbent Member of Parliament	M	Kelowna	Pilot, Ret. RCAF Major	22,627	32.74	2	
Kootenay—Columbia	Robin Goldsbury		F	Balfour	Small business owner	6,151	9.14	3	
North Okanagan—Shuswap	Cindy Derkaz	2015 candidate in the riding	F	Salmon Arm	Retired lawyer	16,783	22.64	2	
Prince George—Peace River—Northern Rockies	Mavis Erickson	Former tribal chief of the Carrier Sekani Tribal Council	F	Prince George	Lawyer	6,391	11.59	2	
Skeena—Bulkley Valley	Dave Birdi	Former municipal councillor for Fort St. James	M	Fort St. James	Economic development officer	4,793	11.58	3	
South Okanagan—West Kootenay	Connie Denesiuk	Former president of the B.C. School Trustees Association, former board chair of the Okanagan Skaha School District	F	Summerland	Construction	11,705	17.16	3	

=== Fraser Valley and Southern Lower Mainland ===
Riding	Candidate's Name	Notes	Gender	Residence	Occupation	Votes	%	Rank	Ref.
Abbotsford	Seamus Heffernan		M	Abbotsford	Political assistant, author	10,560	21.58	2	
Chilliwack—Hope	Kelly Velonis		F	Chilliwack	Program manager	10,848	20.18	2	
Cloverdale—Langley City	John Aldag	Incumbent Member of Parliament	M	Langley	Public servant	19,542	35.22	2	
Delta	Carla Qualtrough	Incumbent Member of Parliament, Minister of Public Services and Procurement and Accessibility	F	Delta	Lawyer	22,257	41.23	1	
Fleetwood—Port Kells	Ken Hardie	Incumbent Member of Parliament	M	Surrey	Communications director	18,545	37.66	1	
Langley—Aldergrove	Leon Jensen	2015 candidate in the riding	M	Langley	Ret. Canadian Armed Forces Lt. Colonel	16,254	25.62	2	
Mission—Matsqui—Fraser Canyon	Jati Sidhu	Incumbent Member of Parliament	M	Abbotsford	Farmer, businessman	12,299	26.70	2	
Pitt Meadows—Maple Ridge	Dan Ruimy	Incumbent Member of Parliament	M	Maple Ridge	Small business owner	16,125	29.73	2	
Richmond Centre	Steven Kou	2015 candidate in Vancouver Kingsway	M	South Surrey	Businessman	11,052	28.47	2	
South Surrey—White Rock	Gordie Hogg	Incumbent Member of Parliament	M	White Rock	Probation officer	21,692	37.38	2	
Steveston—Richmond East	Joe Peschisolido	Incumbent Member of Parliament	M	Richmond	Lawyer	14,731	35.11	2	
Surrey Centre	Randeep Singh Sarai	Incumbent Member of Parliament	M	Surrey	Lawyer	15,453	37.40	1	
Surrey—Newton	Sukh Dhaliwal	Incumbent Member of Parliament	M	Surrey	Businessman	18,960	45.04	1	

=== Vancouver and Northern Lower Mainland ===
Riding	Candidate's Name	Notes	Gender	Residence	Occupation	Votes	%	Rank	Ref.
Burnaby North—Seymour	Terry Beech	Incumbent Member of Parliament	M	Burnaby	Educator	17,770	35.50	1	
Burnaby South	Neelam Brar		F	Burnaby	Businesswoman	10,706	23.79	3	
Coquitlam—Port Coquitlam	Ron McKinnon	Incumbent Member of Parliament	M	Port Coquitlam	IT consultant	20,178	34.69	1	
New Westminster—Burnaby	Will Davis		M	Coquitlam	Comedian	12,414	23.43	2	
North Vancouver	Jonathan Wilkinson	Incumbent Member of Parliament, Minister of Fisheries, Oceans and the Canadian Coast Guard	M	North Vancouver	Businessman	26,979	42.87	1	
Port Moody—Coquitlam	Sara Badiei		F	Coquitlam	Engineer	15,695	29.06	3	
Vancouver Centre	Hedy Fry	Incumbent Member of Parliament	F	Vancouver	Doctor	23,599	42.18	1	
Vancouver East	Kyle Demes		M	Vancouver	University administrator	10,085	18.13	2	
Vancouver Granville	Taleeb Noormohamed		M	Vancouver	Businessman	14,088	26.57	2	
Vancouver Kingsway	Tamara Taggart		F	Vancouver	Broadcaster	10,194	23.08	2	
Vancouver Quadra	Joyce Murray	Incumbent Member of Parliament, President of the Treasury Board and Minister of Digital Government	F	Vancouver	Environmentalist	22,093	43.53	1	
Vancouver South	Harjit S. Sajjan	Incumbent Member of Parliament, Minister of National Defence	M	Vancouver	Canadian Armed Forces, Lt. Col	17,808	41.23	1	
West Vancouver—Sunshine Coast—Sea to Sky Country	Patrick Weiler		M	West Vancouver	Lawyer	22,673	34.89	1	

=== Vancouver Island ===
Riding	Candidate's Name	Notes	Gender	Residence	Occupation	Votes	%	Rank	Ref.
Courtenay—Alberni	Jonah Baden Gowans		M	Powell River	Legislative assistant	8,620	11.93	4	
Cowichan—Malahat—Langford	Blair Herbert		M	Duncan	Real estate agent	10,301	15.79	4	
Esquimalt—Saanich—Sooke	Jammie Hammond		M	Esquimalt	Assistant Deputy Minister, Ret. Canadian Armed Forces Colonel	12,554	17.90	4	
Nanaimo—Ladysmith	Michelle Corfield		F	Nanaimo	Consultant	9,735	13.55	4	
North Island—Powell River	Peter Schwarzhoff	2015 candidate in the riding	M	Campbell River	Meteorologist	8,251	13.11	4	
Saanich—Gulf Islands	Ryan Windsor	Mayor of Central Saanich	M	Central Saanich	Politician	11,326	16.62	3	
Victoria	Nikki Macdonald		F	Victoria	Consultant	15,952	22.30	3	

== Nunavut - 1 seat ==
Riding	Candidate's Name	Notes	Gender	Residence	Occupation	Votes	%	Rank	Ref.
Nunavut	Megan Pizzo Lyall		F	Rankin Inlet	Operations Manager	2,918	30.87	2	

== Northwest Territories - 1 seat ==
Riding	Candidate's Name	Notes	Gender	Residence	Occupation	Votes	%	Rank	Ref.
Northwest Territories	Michael McLeod	Incumbent Member of Parliament	M	Fort Providence	Tourism development officer	6,467	39.70	1	

== Yukon - 1 seat ==
Riding	Candidate's Name	Notes	Gender	Residence	Occupation	Votes	%	Rank	Ref.
Yukon	Larry Bagnell	Incumbent Member of Parliament	M	Whitehorse	Executive director	7,034	33.37	1	

== See also ==
- Results of the 2015 Canadian federal election
- Results of the 2015 Canadian federal election by riding
