= Alfie MacLeod =

Canadian politician (1956–2025)

The Honourable Alfie MacLeod
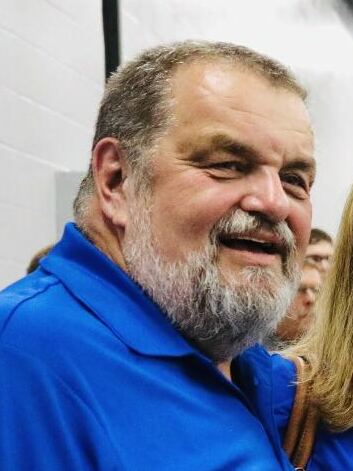
- MacLeod in 2019

49th Speaker of the Nova Scotia House of Assembly
- In office October 25, 2007 – June 24, 2009
- Preceded by: Cecil Clarke
- Succeeded by: Charlie Parker

Member of the Nova Scotia House of Assembly for Sydney River-Mira-Louisbourg Cape Breton West (1995–1998, 2006–2013)
- In office June 13, 2006 – July 31, 2019
- Preceded by: Russell MacKinnon
- Succeeded by: Brian Comer
- In office October 10, 1995 – March 24, 1998
- Preceded by: Russell MacKinnon
- Succeeded by: Russell MacKinnon

Personal details
- Born: March 10, 1956 Sydney, Nova Scotia, Canada
- Died: September 28, 2025 (aged 69) Sydney, Nova Scotia, Canada
- Party: Progressive Conservative
- Spouse: Shirley
- Children: 3
- Occupation: Community relations manager

Alfred Wallace MacLeod (March 10, 1956 – September 28, 2025) was a Canadian politician. He represented the electoral district of Sydney River-Mira-Louisbourg in the Nova Scotia House of Assembly. MacLeod was a member of the Progressive Conservatives.

== Early life ==
MacLeod was born in Sydney, Nova Scotia on March 10, 1956. From 1976 to 1995, he worked a variety of positions with the Cape Breton Development Corporation.

== Political career ==
MacLeod was first elected in the October 1995 Cape Breton West by-election which was triggered by the resignation of incumbent Liberal House Member Russell MacKinnon who ran unsuccessfully to become mayor of the Cape Breton Regional Municipality. In the 1998 Nova Scotia general election, MacKinnon decided to run again for the electoral district and defeated MacLeod in his re-election bid.

In the 2000 federal election, MacLeod was the Progressive Conservative candidate in the electoral district of Bras d'Or—Cape Breton. He lost to Liberal Rodger Cuzner, finishing second, ahead of NDP incumbent Michelle Dockrill.

MacLeod returned to provincial politics in 2006, defeating his former opponent Liberal MLA Russell MacKinnon, for the Progressive Conservative nomination in Cape Breton West, then winning the seat in the 2006 general election. On October 25, 2007, MacLeod was elected Speaker of the Nova Scotia House of Assembly.

MacLeod was re-elected in the 2009, 2013 and 2017 elections.

On May 14, 2019, MacLeod announced he was seeking the Conservative nomination in Cape Breton—Canso for the 2019 federal election. He was named the candidate in June 2019. MacLeod resigned his provincial seat on July 31, 2019. He was defeated in the federal election by the Liberal Party candidate, Mike Kelloway.

== Personal life and death ==
Married to the former Shirley MacDonald; they had three children. He died from cancer at a hospice at Cape Breton Regional Hospital, on September 28, 2025, at the age of 69.

== Electoral record ==
=== Federal ===
2019 Canadian federal election: Cape Breton—Canso
Party	Candidate	Votes	%	±%	Expenditures
Liberal	Mike Kelloway	16,694	38.88	-35.51	none listed
Conservative	Alfie MacLeod	14,821	34.52	+20.07	$99,102.26
New Democratic	Laurie Suitor	6,354	14.80	+6.59	none listed
Green	Clive Doucet	3,321	7.73	+4.77	$23,886.83
People's	Billy Joyce	925	2.15	-	$0.00
Independent	Michelle Dockrill	685	1.60	-	none listed
National Citizens Alliance	Darlene Lynn LeBlanc	140	0.33	-	$0.00
Total valid votes/expense limit		42,940	98.62		$102,831.89
Total rejected ballots		601	1.38	+0.75	
Turnout		43,541	71.73	+0.15	
Eligible voters		60,699			
Liberal hold		Swing		-27.79	
Source: Elections Canada

2000 Canadian federal election: Cape Breton—Canso
Party	Candidate	Votes	%	±%
Liberal	Rodger Cuzner	20,815	54.85	+16.41
Progressive Conservative	Alfie MacLeod	8,114	21.38	+1.12
New Democratic	Michelle Dockrill	7,537	19.86	-21.44
Alliance	John Currie	1,483	3.91	–
Total valid votes		37,949	100.00	
Liberal gain from New Democratic		Swing		+18.93

=== Provincial ===
2013 Nova Scotia general election
Party	Candidate	Votes	%	±%
Progressive Conservative	Alfie MacLeod	4,178	43.75	
Liberal	Josephine Kennedy	3,798	39.77	
New Democratic Party	Delton McDonald	1,573	16.47	

2009 Nova Scotia general election
Party	Candidate	Votes	%	±%
Progressive Conservative	Alfie MacLeod	3,986	43.88	
New Democratic Party	Delton MacDonald	2,750	30.28	
Liberal	Josephine Kennedy	2,206	24.29	
Green	Michael Parsons	141	1.55	–

2006 Nova Scotia general election
Party	Candidate	Votes	%	±%
Progressive Conservative	Alfie MacLeod	4,729	53.76	
Liberal	Dave LeBlanc	2,488	28.28	
New Democratic Party	Terry Crawley	1,344	15.28	
Green	Michael P. Milburn	236	2.68	–

1998 Nova Scotia general election
Party	Candidate	Votes	%	±%
Liberal	Russell MacKinnon	4,528		
New Democratic Party	Brian C. Stanley	2,933		
Progressive Conservative	Alfie MacLeod	2,818		
