= Rodger Cuzner =

Canadian politician

The Honourable Rodger Cuzner

Senator for Nova Scotia
- Incumbent
- Assumed office October 31, 2023
- Nominated by: Justin Trudeau
- Appointed by: Mary Simon

Consul General of Canada to the United States
- In office October 30, 2020 – June 2023
- Prime Minister: Justin Trudeau
- Preceded by: David Alward
- Succeeded by: Bernadette Jordan

Member of Parliament for Cape Breton—Canso (Bras d'Or—Cape Breton; 2000–2004)
- In office November 27, 2000 – October 21, 2019
- Preceded by: Michelle Dockrill
- Succeeded by: Mike Kelloway

Parliamentary Secretary posts
- 2015–2019: Parliamentary Secretary to the Minister of Employment, Workforce Development and Labour
- 2003: Parliamentary Secretary to the Prime Minister

Shadow Cabinet posts
- 2013–2015: Critic for Employment and Social Development
- 2011–2013: Critic for Human Resources and Skills Development
- 2010–2011: Critic for Fisheries and Oceans
- 2008–2010: Chief Opposition Whip
- 2006–2007: Critic for Veterans Affairs

Personal details
- Born: November 4, 1955 (age 70) Glace Bay, Nova Scotia, Canada
- Party: Progressive Senate Group
- Other political affiliations: Liberal (until 2019)
- Spouse: Lynn Cuzner
- Profession: Diplomat, Politician, Community organizer

Rodger Trueman Cuzner (born November 4, 1955) is a Canadian politician and diplomat who currently serves as a Senator for Nova Scotia in the Senate of Canada. He previously served as the Member of Parliament in the House of Commons of Canada for the riding of Cape Breton—Canso and its predecessor, Bras d'Or—Cape Breton, from 2000 to 2019. For most of 2003, he served as Parliamentary Secretary to the Prime Minister under Jean Chrétien, and served as Parliamentary Secretary for Employment, Workforce Development and Labour in the Justin Trudeau government. Between 2020 and 2023, Cuzner served as the Consul General of Canada to the United States (Boston).

== Early life and education ==
Cuzner was born the second of six children born to Trueman and Kay Cuzner in Glace Bay, Nova Scotia. He studied physical education at St. Francis Xavier University in Antigonish. He worked as the special event coordinator for the Cape Breton Department of Recreation, Culture and Facilities, where he was responsible for major events like the Millennium Countdown 2000. Cuzner has been very involved with hockey throughout his life. He coached Team Nova Scotia at the Canada Games in 1995 and 1999.

== Political career ==
Cuzner was a member of the Liberal Party of Canada in the House of Commons of Canada, representing the riding of Bras d'Or—Cape Breton and, later, Cape Breton—Canso. He was first elected in 2000. Cuzner served as Parliamentary Secretary to former Prime Minister Jean Chrétien from January 13, 2003, to December 11, 2003, and held other key positions within the Liberal Caucus, including chair of Nova Scotia Caucus, chair of Atlantic Caucus, and Chief Opposition Whip. He also served as the Parliamentary Secretary for Employment, Workforce Development and Labour.

In his early years in Parliament, Cuzner focused on matters surrounding both Veteran Affairs and Fisheries and Oceans. During the later part of his Parliamentary career, much of his attention was directed toward Workforce Development and National Labour issues.

As an elected official representing Nova Scotia and Cape Breton Island, Cuzner worked with community and industry to further develop the tourism sector through major investments in infrastructure projects, including Cabot Cape Breton's Cabot Links and Cabot Cliffs, notably becoming two top-rated golf courses in the world.

Cuzner regularly represented the Liberal Party on the weekly MP panel on CTV News Channel's Power Play, and was regularly asked to appear on other national political affairs programs, on television, and radio.

Cuzner traditionally delivered a humorous, politically themed rewrite of "Twas the Night Before Christmas" on the last house sitting before the holiday break. After his retirement, it was delivered by Darren Fisher, MP for Dartmouth—Cole Harbour.

He was twice voted as "Most Collegial" Member of Parliament by his Parliamentary colleagues, and was described by Maclean's in 2017 as "Parliament's Sense of Humour".

Cuzner was re-elected to a sixth straight term with 74.4% of the vote in the 2015 Canadian federal election.

On April 26, 2019, Cuzner announced he wouldn't run for re-election in the 2019 election.

== Post-political life ==
On October 31, 2020, it was reported that Prime Minister Justin Trudeau appointed Cuzner as the new Consul General to the United States (Boston).

On October 31, 2023, he was summoned to the Senate of Canada by Governor General Mary Simon, on the advice of Prime Minister Justin Trudeau.

== Personal life ==
Cuzner and his wife Lynn (née Hopkins) have three children: Mitch, Scott and Brad.

== Electoral record ==
2015 Canadian federal election: Cape Breton—Canso
Party	Candidate	Votes	%	±%	Expenditures
Liberal	Rodger Cuzner	32,163	74.39	+30.29	$69,357.97
Conservative	Adam Daniel Rodgers	6,246	14.45	–18.17	$36,970.92
New Democratic	Michelle Smith	3,547	8.20	–11.84	$3,803.75
Green	Maria Goretti Coady	1,281	2.96	–0.28	–
Total valid votes/expense limit		43,237	99.37		$205,381.80
Total rejected ballots		274	0.63		
Turnout		43,511	71.58		
Eligible voters		60,785			
Liberal hold		Swing		+24.23	
Source: Elections Canada

2011 Canadian federal election: Cape Breton—Canso
Party	Candidate	Votes	%	±%	Expenditures
Liberal	Rodger Cuzner	16,478	46.45	-1.65	$63,928.72
Conservative	Clarence Derrick Kennedy	10,873	30.65	+7.15	$75,474.80
New Democratic	Marney Simmons	6,984	19.69	-1.43	$2,528.46
Green	Glen Carabin	1,141	3.22	-4.06	$346.95
Total valid votes/expense limit		35,476	100.0		$83,274.40
Total rejected, unmarked and declined ballots		336	0.94	+0.14	
Turnout		35,812	62.47	-0.84	
Eligible voters		57,331			
Liberal hold		Swing		-4.40	

2008 Canadian federal election: Cape Breton—Canso
Party	Candidate	Votes	%	±%	Expenditures
Liberal	Rodger Cuzner	17,447	48.10	-5.09	$35,405.44
Conservative	Allan Murphy	8,524	23.50	-0.68	$51,511.90
New Democratic	Mark MacNeill	7,660	21.12	+0.98	$6,483.40
Green	Dwayne MacEachern	2,641	7.28	+4.78	$5,315.05
Total valid votes/expense limit		36,272	100.0		$80,776
Total rejected, unmarked and declined ballots		292	0.80	+0.09	
Turnout		36,564	63.31	-3.21	
Eligible voters		57,753			
Liberal hold		Swing		-2.20	

2006 Canadian federal election: Cape Breton—Canso
Party	Candidate	Votes	%	±%	Expenditures
Liberal	Rodger Cuzner	21,424	53.19	-0.07	$62,038.40
Conservative	Kenzie MacNeil	9,740	24.18	+3.94	$47,590.43
New Democratic	Hector Morrison	8,111	20.14	-4.18	$7,662.93
Green	Rob Hines	1,006	2.50	+0.33	$323.17
Total valid votes/expense limit		40,281	100.0		$76,321
Total rejected, unmarked and declined ballots		288	0.71	-0.24	
Turnout		40,569	66.52	+2.72	
Eligible voters		60,984			
Liberal hold		Swing		-2.00	

2004 Canadian federal election: Cape Breton—Canso
Party	Candidate	Votes	%	±%	Expenditures
Liberal	Rodger Cuzner	20,139	53.26	-0.33	$63,078.17
New Democratic	Shirley Hartery	9,197	24.32	+5.44	$21,160.51
Conservative	Kenzie MacNeil	7,654	20.24	-7.19	$49,919.36
Green	Seumas Gibson	820	2.17	–	none listed
Total valid votes/expense limit		37,810	100.0		$73,856
Total rejected, unmarked and declined ballots		361	0.95		
Turnout		38,171	63.80	-3.38	
Eligible voters		59,825			
Liberal notional hold		Swing		-2.88	
Changes from 2000 are based on redistributed results. Conservative Party change is based on the combination of Canadian Alliance and Progressive Conservative Party totals.

2000 Canadian federal election: Cape Breton—Canso
Party	Candidate	Votes	%	±%
Liberal	Rodger Cuzner	20,815	54.85	+16.41
Progressive Conservative	Alfie MacLeod	8,114	21.38	+1.12
New Democratic	Michelle Dockrill	7,537	19.86	-21.44
Alliance	John Currie	1,483	3.91	–
Total valid votes		37,949	100.00	
Liberal gain from New Democratic		Swing		+18.93
