= Clive Doucet =

Canadian writer and politician

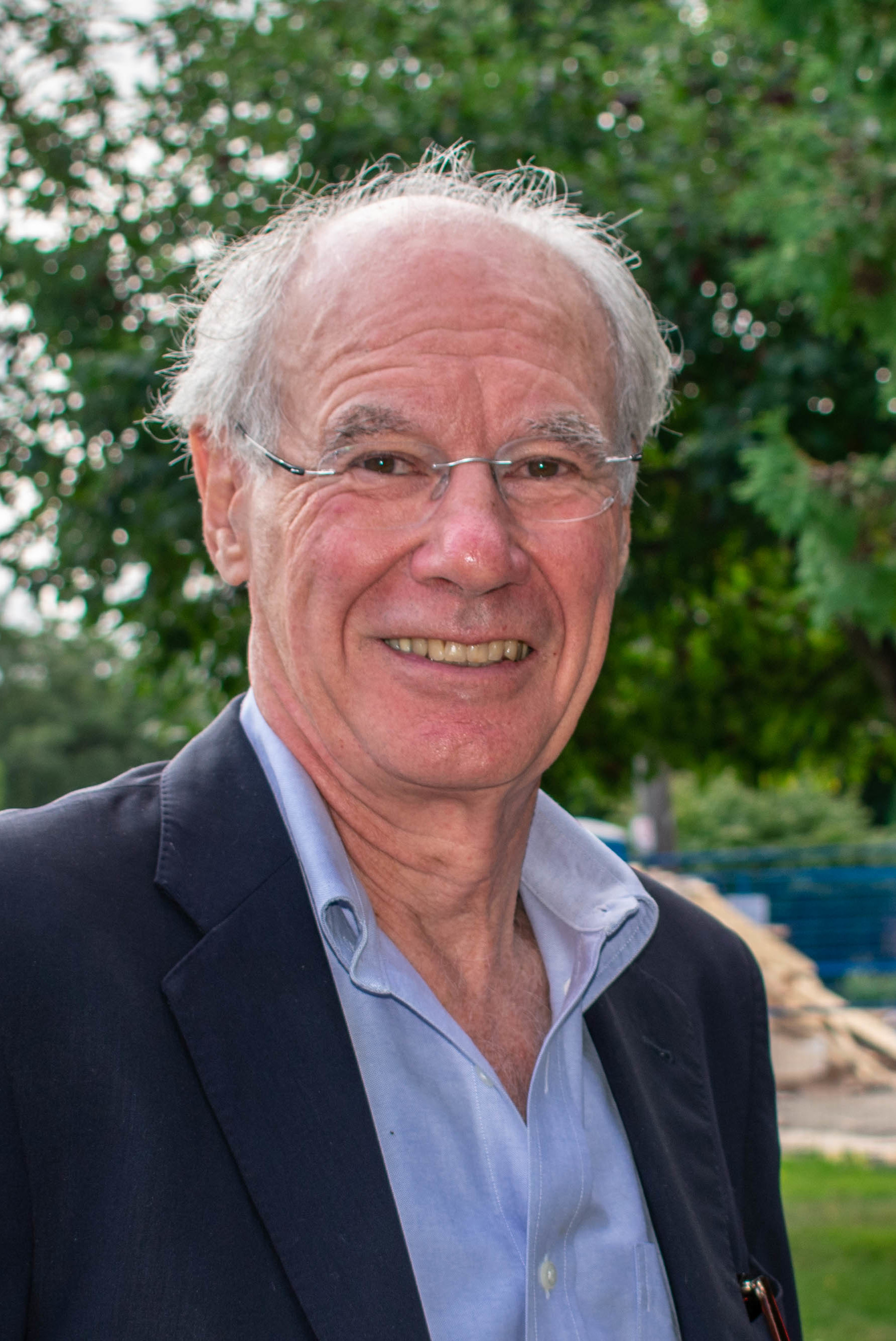
- Doucet in 2018

Ottawa City Councillor
- In office 2001–2010
- Preceded by: Inez Berg
- Succeeded by: David Chernushenko
- Constituency: Capital Ward

Ottawa-Carleton Regional Councillor
- In office 1997–2000
- Preceded by: Brian McGarry
- Succeeded by: Position abolished
- Constituency: Capital Ward

Personal details
- Born: 20 March 1946 (age 80) London, England
- Party: New Democratic Party (c. 2006); Green Party of Canada (since 2019)
- Spouse: Pat Steenberg

Clive Oliver Robert Doucet (born 20 March 1946) is a Canadian writer and politician. He served as the Ottawa City Councillor for Capital Ward from 1997 to 2010 and ran unsuccessfully for Mayor of Ottawa in the 2010 Ottawa municipal election, finishing third with 15 per cent of the vote. Eight years later, in 2018, he again ran unsuccessfully for Mayor of Ottawa, this time finishing second with 22 per cent of the vote.

== Early life ==
Doucet was born in 1946 in London, England to an Acadian serviceman from Grand Étang and an English war bride. Doucet grew up in the city of Ottawa, Ontario, having moved there at the age of six. He also spent some of his youth in St. John's, Newfoundland. Doucet was raised as a Catholic, and his mother was Protestant. He became a Quaker in 1980. He first came to Ottawa in his teens when his father worked there. Doucet played for the Carleton Ravens football team for one season, and then moved to the University of Toronto. A football injury took him out of that sport and into the sport of rowing. He received a master's degree in urban anthropology from the University of Montreal. In his younger days, he spent a summer working in a rock copper mine in British Columbia and helped build the National Arts Centre as a construction worker. Before entering politics, Doucet was a municipal affairs policy advisor.

== Politics ==
In the 1997 regional elections, Doucet ran for Ottawa-Carleton Regional Council in Capital Ward, which includes The Glebe, Old Ottawa South, Old Ottawa East, part of Riverview Park, Carleton University, and Heron Park. He was an activist against the proposed Bronson Freeway, which propelled him to victory.

Central to his political platform has been the creation of a light rail rapid transit system across Ottawa manifested to date with the O-Train demonstration project (today's Line 2).

On 6 July 2010, Doucet announced his candidacy for Mayor of Ottawa in the 2010 Ottawa municipal election. Doucet joined a record number of 115 candidates running for municipal office in 2010, of which 15 challenged mayoral incumbent Larry O'Brien. Doucet placed third with 15 per cent of the vote.

During the 2018 Ontario election campaign, Doucet volunteered in Ottawa Centre for NDP candidate Joel Harden.

On July 27, 2018, Doucet announced that he would once again be running for Mayor of Ottawa in the 2018 Ottawa municipal election. Doucet placed second behind incumbent mayor Jim Watson, whom he had also lost to in 2010. He won 22 per cent of the vote.

Doucet ran as the Green Party candidate in the 2019 federal election for the riding of Cape Breton—Canso, the riding of his secondary residence of Grand Étang, Nova Scotia. He placed fourth, losing to Liberal candidate Mike Kelloway.

== Publications ==
Throughout his career, Doucet has been a writer of novels, poetry, plays, and non-fiction, often writing about his Acadian roots. His most recent book, Urban Meltdown: Cities, Climate Change and Politics as Usual, was published by New Society Publishers in 2007. In its review, The Walrus wrote "When Doucet speaks from the firm ground of experience as city councillor, his sharply logical solutions to municipal problems seem both hopeful and achievable."

=== Fiction ===
- Disneyland Please, novel, 1978, shortlisted for the W.H. Smith First Novel Award
- John Coe's War, novel, 1983
- Gospel According to Mary Magdalene, novel, 1990
- The Priest's Boy, linked short stories, 1992

=== Non-fiction ===
- My Grandfather's Cape Breton, originally 1980, republished in 2003 – a memoir of summer boyhood visits to his grandfather on the family farm on Cape Breton Island in the 1960s.
- Lost and Found in Acadie (2004), a meditation on Acadian history, the Great Expulsion of 1755 and his visit to the Second Acadian World Congress in Louisiana in 1999.
- Notes from Exile, 1999 – profiles his visit to the 1994 First Acadian World Congress in New Brunswick.
- Acadian Memories, 2005 – collaboration with photographer Francois Gaudet, a coffee table book keepsake of the Third Acadian World Congress held in Ste Anne, Nova Scotia in 2004.

=== Poetry ===
- Before Star Wars, 1981
- Debris of Planets, 1993
- Looking for Henry, 1999 – an epic poem meditating on the deportation of Acadians in 1755 contrasted to the defeat of the Metis Nation in 1885, and how the victors get to write history.
- Canal Seasons, 2003

=== Plays ===
- Hatching Eggs, National Arts Centre, 1976
- A Very Desirable Residence, Penguin Performance Company, 1978
- Chicken Delight, CBC Playhouse (radio), 1978
- May the Best Man Win
- The Chez Lucien is Dead (with Wayne Rostad)

== Electoral record ==
=== Federal ===
2019 Canadian federal election: Cape Breton—Canso
Party	Candidate	Votes	%	±%	Expenditures
Liberal	Mike Kelloway	16,694	38.88	-35.51	none listed
Conservative	Alfie MacLeod	14,821	34.52	+20.07	$99,102.26
New Democratic	Laurie Suitor	6,354	14.80	+6.59	none listed
Green	Clive Doucet	3,321	7.73	+4.77	$23,886.83
People's	Billy Joyce	925	2.15	-	$0.00
Independent	Michelle Dockrill	685	1.60	-	none listed
National Citizens Alliance	Darlene Lynn LeBlanc	140	0.33	-	$0.00
Total valid votes/expense limit		42,940	98.62		$102,831.89
Total rejected ballots		601	1.38	+0.75	
Turnout		43,541	71.73	+0.15	
Eligible voters		60,699			
Liberal hold		Swing		-27.79	
Source: Elections Canada

=== Municipal ===
==== Mayoral ====
Mayoral candidate	Vote	%
Jim Watson (X)	188,960	71.03
Clive Doucet	59,156	22.24
Bruce McConville	4,360	1.64
Craig MacAulay	2,272	0.85
Ahmed Bouragba	1,912	0.72
Joey Drouin	1,893	0.71
Hamid Alakozai	1,867	0.70
James T. Sheahan	1,354	0.51
Michael Pastien	1,177	0.44
Ryan Lythall	1,115	0.42
Moises Schachtler	994	0.37
Bernard Couchman	964	0.36

Mayor
Candidate	Votes	%
Jim Watson	131,323	48.70
Larry O'Brien (X)	64,862	24.06
Clive Doucet	40,148	14.89
Andrew S. Haydon	18,914	7.01
Mike Maguire	6,618	2.45
15 other candidates	7,775	2.88
Total votes	269,640	100.00
Source: "2010 municipal election results". City of Ottawa. Archived from the original on 19 February 2014.

==== City Councillor ====
Capital Ward (Ward 17)
Candidate	Votes	%
Clive Doucet (X)	6,495	48.14%
Jay Nordenstrom	4,602	34.11%
Ian Boyd	1,963	14.55%
Sean Curran	433	3.21%

Capital Ward (Ward 17)
Candidate	Votes	%
Clive Doucet (X)	5,785	80.06%
C.R.L. Erickson	1,024	14.17%
Mike Salmon	417	5.77%

Capital Ward (Ward 17)
Candidate	Votes	%
Clive Doucet (X)	6,486	69.51
Jim Bickford	2,845	30.49

Capital Ward (Ward 17)
Candidate	Votes	%
Clive Doucet	2,984	36.80
Jim Kennelly	2,051	25.29
Robin Quinn	1,571	19.37
Ed Barter	1,002	12.36
David McNicoll	501	6.18

Preceded by Brian McGarry	Regional councillors from Capital Ward; 1997–2000	Succeeded by Position abolished
Preceded by Inez Berg	City councillors from Capital Ward; 2000–2010	Succeeded by David Chernushenko
