= Michelle Dockrill =

Canadian politician

Member of the Canadian Parliament for Bras d'Or
- In office September 22, 1997 – October 22, 2000
- Preceded by: district created
- Succeeded by: Rodger Cuzner

Personal details
- Born: May 22, 1959 (age 67) Glace Bay, Nova Scotia, Canada
- Party: New Democratic Party

Michelle Dockrill (born May 22, 1959) is a former Canadian politician who represented the Nova Scotia riding of Bras d'Or in the House of Commons from 1997 to 2000.

== Early life ==
Prior to entering politics, Dockrill was a member of the Nova Scotia Government Employee's Union and a receptionist at a Cape Breton health care facility.

== 1997 election ==
Dockrill was nominated to run for the Canadian New Democratic Party in the federal election called for June 2, 1997. She was up against then-Health Minister David Dingwall, perceived as the most powerful Nova Scotian figure in the government of then-Prime Minister Jean Chrétien. With the NDP having only won 5% of the vote in 1993, Dockrill, nominated after the election had already been called, was not taken seriously by Dingwall's Liberals or the NDP, who initially devoted few resources to her campaign.

Dingwall, MP for the area since 1980, was seen as unable or unwilling to use his vast patronage powers to improve living conditions in his impoverished riding. Changes to laws governing unemployment insurance, restrictions on the fisheries, the slow destruction of the area's coal mining industry and problems with health care services all contributed to a growing sense that Dingwall was out of touch.

Dockrill ran an aggressive campaign, assisted by resources directed to the riding by then Nova Scotia NDP Provincial Secretary Ron Cavalucci. Cavalucci sent his assistant to manage the campaign; he launched a series of ads accusing Dingwall of lying and implicating him in secret discussions to close the coal mines. Dingwall was seen to lose a CBC Radio debate with Dockrill and the Progressive Conservative candidate.

On election night, Dockrill defeated Dingwall by more than 1,200 votes, capturing 41.30% of the vote.

== Member of Parliament ==
She worked tirelessly on the issue of the coal industry, the last Cape Breton mine was closed soon after her defeat in the election of November 2000, when she lost in a landslide by Liberal Rodger Cuzner. She achieved brief fame for being the first MP to bring her newborn baby into the House of Commons.

In 2004 Dockrill, who had returned to her previous position working in a health facility, ran for and lost the NDP nomination to newcomer Shirley Hartery, who went on to be defeated by Cuzner in the June election.

== Electoral record ==
2019 Canadian federal election: Cape Breton—Canso
| Party | Candidate | Votes | % | ±% | Expenditures |
|---|---|---|---|---|---|
| Liberal | Mike Kelloway | 16,694 | 38.88 | -35.51 | none listed |
| Conservative | Alfie MacLeod | 14,821 | 34.52 | +20.07 | $99,102.26 |
| New Democratic | Laurie Suitor | 6,354 | 14.80 | +6.59 | none listed |
| Green | Clive Doucet | 3,321 | 7.73 | +4.77 | $23,886.83 |
| People's | Billy Joyce | 925 | 2.15 | - | $0.00 |
| Independent | Michelle Dockrill | 685 | 1.60 | - | none listed |
| National Citizens Alliance | Darlene Lynn LeBlanc | 140 | 0.33 | - | $0.00 |
| Total valid votes/expense limit | | 42,940 | 98.62 | | $102,831.89 |
| Total rejected ballots | | 601 | 1.38 | +0.75 | |
| Turnout | | 43,541 | 71.73 | +0.15 | |
| Eligible voters | | 60,699 | | | |
| Liberal hold | | Swing | | -27.79 | |
Source: Elections Canada

2000 Canadian federal election: Cape Breton—Canso
| Party | Candidate | Votes | % | ±% |
|---|---|---|---|---|
| Liberal | Rodger Cuzner | 20,815 | 54.85 | +16.41 |
| Progressive Conservative | Alfie MacLeod | 8,114 | 21.38 | +1.12 |
| New Democratic | Michelle Dockrill | 7,537 | 19.86 | -21.44 |
| Alliance | John Currie | 1,483 | 3.91 | – |
| Total valid votes | | 37,949 | 100.00 | |
| Liberal gain from New Democratic | | Swing | | +18.93 |

1997 Canadian federal election: Cape Breton—Canso
| Party | Candidate | Votes | % |
|---|---|---|---|
| New Democratic | Michelle Dockrill | 17,575 | 41.30 |
| Liberal | David Dingwall | 16,358 | 38.44 |
| Progressive Conservative | Frank Crowdis | 8,620 | 20.26 |
| Total valid votes | | 42,553 | 100.00 |
