= Sydney—Glace Bay =

Federal electoral district in Nova Scotia, Canada

Nova Scotia electoral district
- Interactive map of riding boundaries from the 2025 federal election

Federal electoral district
- Legislature: House of Commons
MP
Mike Kelloway
Liberal
- District created: 2023
- First contested: 2025
- Last contested: 2025
- District webpage: profile, map

Demographics
- Population (2021): 72,361
- Electors (2025): 67,979
- Area (km²): 4,313
- Pop. density (per km²): 16.8
- Census division: Cape Breton
- Census subdivision(s): Cape Breton (part), Membertou

Sydney—Glace Bay is a federal electoral district in Nova Scotia, Canada, that is represented in the House of Commons of Canada. It was created in 2023 following the 2022 Canadian federal electoral redistribution process. It was created from parts of Sydney—Victoria and Cape Breton Highlands—Canso electoral districts and mostly represents the old Industrial Cape Breton area.

== History ==
ED 12011-Sydney–-Glace Bay Boundary Map

Following the 2022 Canadian federal electoral redistribution, Sydney—Glace Bay was created. It exchanged territory with Cape Breton—Canso, losing Victoria, the remainder of Inverness and rural western part of the Cape Breton Regional Municipality. The new district gained the urban part of the Cape Breton Regional Municipality from Sydney Forks to Port Morien, including the Glace Bay area.

== Members of Parliament ==
Parliament	Years	Member	Party
Sydney—Glace Bay
45th	2025–present	Mike Kelloway	Liberal

== Election results ==
2025 Canadian federal election
Party	Candidate	Votes	%	±%	Expenditures
Liberal	Mike Kelloway	25,766	54.63	+12.70	
Conservative	Anna Manley	17,978	38.12	+3.95	
New Democratic	Kimberly Losier	1,789	3.79	−15.97	
Independent	Joe Ward	601	1.27		
People's	Jeffrey Evely	589	1.25	−2.02	
Libertarian	Michael Pittman	189	0.40	N/A	
Canadian Future	Chris Gallant	169	0.36	N/A	
Marxist–Leninist	Nik Boisvert	085	0.18	−0.05	
Total valid votes/expense limit		47,504	99.22		
Total rejected ballots		373	0.78		
Turnout		47,877	70.08		
Eligible voters		68,320			
Liberal notional hold		Swing		+4.38	
Source: Elections Canada
Note: number of eligible voters does not include voting day registrations.

2021 federal election redistributed results
Party	Vote	%
Liberal	17,539	41.93
Conservative	14,294	34.17
New Democratic	8,265	19.76
People's	1,367	3.27
Green	267	0.64
Others	95	0.23

== See also ==
- List of Canadian electoral districts
- Historical federal electoral districts of Canada
