= Kenzie MacNeil =

Canadian politician (1952–2021)

Kenzie MacNeil ONS (2 September 1952 – 24 July 2021) was a Canadian songwriter, performer, producer and director in television, film, radio and stage, and a former Conservative Party of Canada candidate. MacNeil completed a Bachelor of Arts degree from St. Francis Xavier University. He also studied at the University of Botswana in Lesotho and Swaziland while accompanying his parents on field work with CIDA in Africa for three years.

== Biography ==
MacNeil was a major force behind The Rise and Follies of Cape Breton Island, a satirical sketch review that ran from 1978 to 1982. The revue included songs inspired by the coal and steel industry of Cape Breton and featured local musicians. He also served as Artistic Director/Producer of the Cape Breton Music and Theatre Company, and worked as Director of the UCCB Press.

Over the years he contributed to Peter Gzowski's This Country in the Morning and Morningside on CBC Radio, and on some of the most popular television shows of the time: Singalong Jubilee, Ceilidh, Tommy Hunter, Ryan’s Fancy, Ian Tyson, and many others. Kenzie MacNeil also had an active theatrical career performing in productions like Tom Gallant's Step/Dance and with Gordon Pinsent in John and the Missus, and was nominated for an ACTRA award for Best Supporting Actor for his work in Last Night in Town. He was involved in the production of the National Film Board's Empty Harbours, Empty Dreams, 12,000 Men, and Scoggie. As well, MacNeil worked as Chair of the Nova Scotia Film Development Corporation and helped with the creation of soundstages across the mainland and on the Island, and in particular, assisted with bringing the productions Pit Pony and New Waterford Girl to Cape Breton.

MacNeil is best known for his song “The Island,” an unofficial anthem of Cape Breton Island. The song is a tribute to coal industry workers in Nova Scotia. According to Men of the Deeps musical director, John O'Donnell, "the words offer a vivid demonstration that labour in Cape Breton has indeed had a deep cultural impact on the community." He also worked as a development officer with the Nova Scotia Department of Economic Development, and has been the editor and publisher of the Cape Bretoner magazine.

== Politics ==
MacNeil ran as a Conservative Party of Canada in Cape Breton—Canso in the 2004 and 2006 federal elections, coming third and second respectively behind Liberal incumbent Rodger Cuzner. In the 2019 federal election, MacNeil ran as an independent candidate in Sydney—Victoria, but finished in sixth place.

== Personal ==
MacNeil died on 24 July 2021. He was posthumously awarded the Order of Nova Scotia in 2022.

== Electoral record ==
2019 Canadian federal election: Sydney—Victoria
Party	Candidate	Votes	%	±%	Expenditures
Liberal	Jaime Battiste	12,536	30.90	−42.30	$63,429.21
Conservative	Eddie Orrell	11,227	27.68	+17.04	none listed
New Democratic	Jodi McDavid	8,146	20.08	+7.02	none listed
Independent	Archie MacKinnon	5,679	14.00	New	none listed
Green	Lois Foster	2,249	5.54	+3.04	$0.00
Independent	Kenzie MacNeil	480	1.18	New	none listed
Veterans Coalition	Randy Joy	248	0.61	New	$0.00
Total valid votes/expense limit		40,565	98.72		$99,536.07
Total rejected ballots		528	1.28	+0.71	
Turnout		41,093	68.12	−0.84	
Eligible voters		60,322			
Liberal hold		Swing		−29.67	
Source: Elections Canada

2006 Canadian federal election: Cape Breton—Canso
Party	Candidate	Votes	%	±%	Expenditures
Liberal	Rodger Cuzner	21,424	53.19	-0.07	$62,038.40
Conservative	Kenzie MacNeil	9,740	24.18	+3.94	$47,590.43
New Democratic	Hector Morrison	8,111	20.14	-4.18	$7,662.93
Green	Rob Hines	1,006	2.50	+0.33	$323.17
Total valid votes/expense limit		40,281	100.0		$76,321
Total rejected, unmarked and declined ballots		288	0.71	-0.24	
Turnout		40,569	66.52	+2.72	
Eligible voters		60,984			
Liberal hold		Swing		-2.00	

2004 Canadian federal election: Cape Breton—Canso
Party	Candidate	Votes	%	±%	Expenditures
Liberal	Rodger Cuzner	20,139	53.26	-0.33	$63,078.17
New Democratic	Shirley Hartery	9,197	24.32	+5.44	$21,160.51
Conservative	Kenzie MacNeil	7,654	20.24	-7.19	$49,919.36
Green	Seumas Gibson	820	2.17	–	none listed
Total valid votes/expense limit		37,810	100.0		$73,856
Total rejected, unmarked and declined ballots		361	0.95		
Turnout		38,171	63.80	-3.38	
Eligible voters		59,825			
Liberal notional hold		Swing		-2.88	
Changes from 2000 are based on redistributed results. Conservative Party change is based on the combination of Canadian Alliance and Progressive Conservative Party totals.
