= Mike Kelloway =

Canadian politician (born 1970)

Mike Kelloway MP

Parliamentary Secretary to the Minister of Transport and Internal Trade
- Incumbent
- Assumed office June 5, 2025

Member of Parliament for Sydney—Glace Bay (Cape Breton—Canso; 2019–2025)
- Incumbent
- Assumed office October 21, 2019
- Preceded by: Rodger Cuzner

Personal details
- Born: Michael J. Kelloway; September 9, 1970 (age 55) Glace Bay, Nova Scotia, Canada
- Party: Liberal

Michael J. "Mike" Kelloway MP (born September 9, 1970) is a Canadian politician who has been a Liberal Party member of the House of Commons of Canada since the 2019 Canadian federal election.

At the time of the 2025 Canadian federal election, he lived in Sydney, Nova Scotia.

== Electoral record ==
2025 Canadian federal election: Sydney—Glace Bay
Party	Candidate	Votes	%	±%	Expenditures
Liberal	Mike Kelloway	25,766	54.63	+12.70	$118,759.85
Conservative	Anna Manley	17,978	38.12	+3.95	$83,390.35
New Democratic	Kimberly Losier	1,789	3.79	–15.97	$1,080.77
Independent	Joe Ward	601	1.27	–	none listed
People's	Jeffrey Evely	589	1.25	–2.02	$6,726.00
Libertarian	Michael Pittman	189	0.40	–	none listed
Canadian Future	Chris Gallant	169	0.36	–	$17.25
Marxist–Leninist	Nik Boisvert	85	0.18	–0.05	none listed
Total valid votes/expense limit		47,166	99.22	–	$122,337.13
Total rejected ballots		373	0.78	–	
Turnout		47,539	69.22	–	
Eligible voters		68,679			
Liberal notional hold		Swing		+4.38	
Source: Elections Canada

2021 Canadian federal election: Cape Breton—Canso
Party	Candidate	Votes	%	±%	Expenditures
Liberal	Mike Kelloway	18,288	46.46	+7.58	$84,296.86
Conservative	Fiona MacLeod	13,805	35.07	+0.55	$87,677.71
New Democratic	Jana Reddick	5,618	14.27	-0.53	$7,070.64
People's	Brad Grandy	1,649	4.19	+2.04	$0.00
Total valid votes/expense limit		39,360	99.19	+0.57	$107,460.21
Total rejected ballots		350	0.81	-0.57	
Turnout		39,710	65.57	-6.13	
Registered voters		60,559			
Liberal hold		Swing		+3.52	
Source: Elections Canada

2019 Canadian federal election: Cape Breton—Canso
Party	Candidate	Votes	%	±%	Expenditures
Liberal	Mike Kelloway	16,694	38.88	-35.51	none listed
Conservative	Alfie MacLeod	14,821	34.52	+20.07	$99,102.26
New Democratic	Laurie Suitor	6,354	14.80	+6.59	none listed
Green	Clive Doucet	3,321	7.73	+4.77	$23,886.83
People's	Billy Joyce	925	2.15	-	$0.00
Independent	Michelle Dockrill	685	1.60	-	none listed
National Citizens Alliance	Darlene Lynn LeBlanc	140	0.33	-	$0.00
Total valid votes/expense limit		42,940	98.62		$102,831.89
Total rejected ballots		601	1.38	+0.75	
Turnout		43,541	71.73	+0.15	
Eligible voters		60,699			
Liberal hold		Swing		-27.79	
Source: Elections Canada
