= Sydney—Victoria =

Federal electoral district in Nova Scotia, Canada

Nova Scotia electoral district
- Sydney—Victoria from the 2015 federal election to 2025

Defunct federal electoral district
- Legislature: House of Commons
- District created: 1996
- District abolished: 2025
- First contested: 1997
- Last contested: 2021
- District webpage: profile, map

Demographics
- Population (2021): 72,361
- Electors (2021): 59,757
- Area (km²): 4,313
- Census division(s): Cape Breton
- Census subdivision(s): Cape Breton

Sydney—Victoria was a federal electoral district in Nova Scotia, Canada, that was represented in the House of Commons of Canada from 1997 to 2025. It was created in 1996 from parts of Cape Breton—The Sydneys, Cape Breton—East Richmond and Cape Breton Highlands—Canso electoral districts. Its first Member of Parliament (MP) was Peter Mancini and its final MP was Jaime Battiste.

After the 2022 Canadian federal electoral redistribution, this district was replaced largely by Sydney—Glace Bay. The new urban district represents most of the former Industrial Cape Breton area. Sydney—Glace Bay ceded most of Cape Breton—Victoria's rural areas to the new Cape Breton—Canso—Antigonish district. Sydney—Victoria was abolished when the writ dropped for the 2025 Canadian general election on 23 March 2025.

== Demographics ==
Historical population
Year	Pop.	±%
2001	79,294	—
2006	76,801	−3.1%
2011	73,328	−4.5%
2016	72,148	−1.6%

According to the 2021 Canadian census

Ethnic groups: 83.9% European, 10.5% Indigenous, 2.4% South Asian, 1.3% Black
Religion: 74.2% Christian (50.5% Catholic, 6.7% United Church, 5.7% Anglican, 3% Presbyterian), 22.5% No religion stated.
Median income (2020): $33,600
Average income (2020): $40,92
Languages: (2021) 68,055 (93.3%) English; 2,375 (4.1%) Mi’kmaq; 590 (0.9%) French; 290 (0.3%) Mandarin; 505 (0.8%) Punjabi; 160 (0.2%) Tagalog; 65 (0.1%) Arabic; 40 (0.1%) Urdu; 75 (0.1%) German; 55 (0.1%) Dutch, 25 (0.1%) Cantonese, 25 (0.1%) Italian; 25 Ukrainian (0.1%); 15 (0.1%) Scottish Gaelic.

== Geography ==
It consisted of:

- The County of Victoria;
- the northern part of the County of Inverness, i.e., the part lying north of the southern boundary of Cape Breton Highlands National Park; and
- the northwestern part of the Cape Breton Regional Municipality, i.e., the part lying northwest of a line drawn northeast from Bras d'Or Lake to the northeast extremity of East Bay, due north to Portage Brook, northeast along Portage Brook, Blacketts Lake, the Sydney River, Highway 125, Trunk 4 (Grand Lake Road), Northwest Brook, the western shoreline of Grand Lake, the DEVCO Railway, and its northern branch (running towards the Community of Dominion) to its second intersection with Northwest Brook (north of Grand Lake), and then north and northeast along that brook, Lingan Bay and Indian Bay to the Atlantic Ocean.

== History ==
The electoral district maintained its boundaries as per the 2012 federal electoral redistribution.

Following the 2022 Canadian federal electoral redistribution, this riding will largely be replaced by Sydney—Glace Bay. It will exchange territory with Cape Breton—Canso, losing Victoria, the remainder of Inverness and rural western part of the Cape Breton Regional Municipality, and gain the urban part of the Cape Breton Regional Municipality from Sydney Forks to Port Morien, including the Glace Bay area).

== Members of Parliament ==
This electoral district has elected the following members of Parliament:

Parliament	Years	Member	Party
Sydney—Victoria
36th	1997–2000	Peter Mancini	New Democratic
37th	2000–2004	Mark Eyking	Liberal
38th	2004–2006	Mark Eyking	Liberal
39th	2006–2008	Mark Eyking	Liberal
40th	2008–2011	Mark Eyking	Liberal
41st	2011–2015	Mark Eyking	Liberal
42nd	2015–2019	Mark Eyking	Liberal
43rd	2019–2021	Jaime Battiste	Liberal
44th	2021–2025	Jaime Battiste	Liberal

== Election results ==
=== 2021 ===
2021 Canadian federal election
Party	Candidate	Votes	%	±%	Expenditures
Liberal	Jaime Battiste	14,250	39.2	+8.3	$68,768.55
Conservative	Eddie Orrell	13,166	36.3	+8.6	none listed
New Democratic	Jeff Ward	7,217	19.9	-0.2	$11,605.07
People's	Ronald Angus Barron	1,176	3.2	N/A	$1,145.74
Green	Mark Embrett	376	1.0	-4.5	$0.00
Marxist–Leninist	Nikki Boisvert	127	0.3	N/A	$0.00
Total valid votes/expense limit		36,312	98.7	±0.0	$102,433.21
Total rejected ballots		472	1.3	±0.0	
Turnout		36,784	61.6	-6.5	
Registered voters		59,757			
Liberal hold		Swing		-0.2	
Source: Elections Canada

=== 2019 ===
2019 Canadian federal election
Party	Candidate	Votes	%	±%	Expenditures
Liberal	Jaime Battiste	12,536	30.90	−42.30	$63,429.21
Conservative	Eddie Orrell	11,227	27.68	+17.04	none listed
New Democratic	Jodi McDavid	8,146	20.08	+7.02	none listed
Independent	Archie MacKinnon	5,679	14.00	New	none listed
Green	Lois Foster	2,249	5.54	+3.04	$0.00
Independent	Kenzie MacNeil	480	1.18	New	none listed
Veterans Coalition	Randy Joy	248	0.61	New	$0.00
Total valid votes/expense limit		40,565	98.72		$99,536.07
Total rejected ballots		528	1.28	+0.71	
Turnout		41,093	68.12	−0.84	
Eligible voters		60,322			
Liberal hold		Swing		−29.67	
Source: Elections Canada

=== 2015 ===
2015 Canadian federal election
Party	Candidate	Votes	%	±%	Expenditures
Liberal	Mark Eyking	29,995	73.20	+33.29	–
New Democratic	Monika Dutt	5,351	13.06	–5.97	$32,027.50
Conservative	John Douglas Chiasson	4,360	10.64	–27.21	$41,720.11
Green	Matthew Cavanaugh	1,026	2.50	–0.71	–
Libertarian	Wayne James Hiscock	242	0.59	–	–
Total valid votes/expense limit		40,974	100.00		$195,473.50
Total rejected ballots		236	0.57		
Turnout		41,210	68.96		
Eligible voters		59,761			
Liberal hold		Swing		+19.63	
Source: Elections Canada

=== 2011 ===
2011 Canadian federal election
Party	Candidate	Votes	%	±%	Expenditures
Liberal	Mark Eyking	14,788	39.91	-9.49	$67,454.53
Conservative	Cecil Clarke	14,023	37.85	+17.23	$77,334.98
New Democratic	Kathy MacLeod	7,049	19.02	-5.42	$17,238.77
Green	Chris Milburn	1,191	3.21	-2.33	$0.00
Total valid votes/expense limit		37,051	100.0		$80,666.28
Total rejected, unmarked and declined ballots		279	0.75	+0.03	
Turnout		37,330	61.48	+4.07	
Eligible voters		60,719			
Liberal hold		Swing		-13.36	

=== 2008 ===
2008 Canadian federal election
Party	Candidate	Votes	%	±%	Expenditures
Liberal	Mark Eyking	17,303	49.40	-0.48	$60,561.52
New Democratic	Wayne McKay	8,559	24.44	-4.06	$15,485.05
Conservative	Kristen Rudderham	7,223	20.62	+2.28	$60,092.18
Green	Collin Harker	1,941	5.54	+2.25	$1,966.54
Total valid votes/expense limit		35,026	100.0		$78,337
Total rejected, unmarked and declined ballots		254	0.72	+0.16	
Turnout		35,280	57.41	-5.89	
Eligible voters		61,448			
Liberal hold		Swing		+1.79	

=== 2006 ===
2006 Canadian federal election
Party	Candidate	Votes	%	±%	Expenditures
Liberal	Mark Eyking	20,277	49.88	-2.25	$47,473.95
New Democratic	John Hugh Edwards	11,587	28.50	+0.79	$28,987.58
Conservative	Howie MacDonald	7,455	18.34	+2.47	$26,033.71
Green	Chris Milburn	1,336	3.29	+0.99	$537.60
Total valid votes/expense limit		40,655	100.0		$73,953
Total rejected, unmarked and declined ballots		227	0.56	-0.23	
Turnout		40,882	63.30	+2.72	
Eligible voters		64,589			
Liberal hold		Swing		-1.52	

=== 2004 ===
2004 Canadian federal election
Party	Candidate	Votes	%	±%	Expenditures
Liberal	Mark Eyking	19,372	52.13	+2.14	$51,343.95
New Democratic	John Hugh Edwards	10,298	27.71	-8.50	$24,957.69
Conservative	Howie MacDonald	5,897	15.87	+2.08	$48,515.46
Green	Chris Milburn	855	2.30	–	$580.41
Marijuana	Cathy Thériault	474	1.28	–	none listed
Independent	B. Chris Gallant	264	0.71	–	$165.54
Total valid votes/expense limit		37,160	100.0		$71,187
Total rejected, unmarked and declined ballots		297	0.79		
Turnout		37,457	60.58		
Eligible voters		61,826			
Liberal notional hold		Swing		+5.32	
Changes from 2000 are based on redistributed results. Conservative Party change is based on the combination of Canadian Alliance and Progressive Conservative Party totals.

2000 federal election redistributed results
Party	Vote	%
Liberal	19,698	49.99
New Democratic	14,267	36.21
Progressive Conservative	3,934	9.98
Alliance	1,501	3.81

=== 2000 ===
2000 Canadian federal election
Party	Candidate	Votes	%	±%
Liberal	Mark Eyking	19,388	49.8	+23.5
New Democratic	Peter Mancini	14,216	36.5	-14.6
Progressive Conservative	Anna Curtis-Steele	3,779	9.7	-12.9
Alliance	Rod A.M. Farrell	1,528	3.9	
Total valid votes		38,911	100.0	

=== 1997 ===
1997 Canadian federal election
Party	Candidate	Votes	%
New Democratic	Peter Mancini	22,455	51.1
Liberal	Vince MacLean	11,569	26.3
Progressive Conservative	Cecil Clarke	9,920	22.6
Total valid votes		43,944	100.0

== See also ==
- List of Canadian electoral districts
- Historical federal electoral districts of Canada
