= Jaime Battiste =

Canadian politician (born 1979)

Jaime Battiste MP

Parliamentary Secretary to the Minister of Crown-Indigenous Relations
- Incumbent
- Assumed office June 5, 2025

Member of Parliament for Cape Breton—Canso—Antigonish (Sydney—Victoria; 2019–2025)
- Incumbent
- Assumed office October 21, 2019
- Preceded by: Mark Eyking

Personal details
- Born: October 18, 1979 (age 47) Sydney, Nova Scotia, Canada
- Party: Liberal

Jaime Youngmedicine Battiste (Note: Pronounced /ˈhaɪmeɪ/ HI-may) MP (born October 18, 1979) is a Canadian politician who has been a member of the House of Commons of Canada as a member of the Liberal Party since 2019. A member of the Eskasoni First Nation, he is the first Mi'kmaw member of Parliament (MP) in Canada.

== Background ==
Battiste is the son of Chickasaw legal scholar James (Sákéj) Youngblood Henderson and Miꞌkmaq scholar Marie Battiste, both recipients of Indspire Awards. He is a member of the Eskasoni First Nation.

Battiste spent his formative years in Saskatoon, Saskatchewan, graduating from Evan Hardy Collegiate in 1997. He holds a degree in Mi’kmaq studies from Cape Breton University and a Juris Doctor from the Schulich School of Law at Dalhousie University.

From 2005 to 2006, Battiste served as co-chair of the Assembly of First Nations National Youth Council. He is also a former AFN regional chief.

Battiste was a member of the Content Advisory Committee for the Canadian Museum for Human Rights.

Battiste was responsible for negotiating the memorandum of understanding that established treaty education in Nova Scotia.

== Political career ==
In April 2019, Battiste announced he was seeking the Liberal nomination in Sydney—Victoria for the 2019 federal election. He won the nomination on July 13, 2019. He faced calls for his removal as a candidate after controversial social media posts came to light.

On October 21, 2019, Battiste was elected as the member of Parliament (MP) in Sydney—Victoria becoming the first Mi'kmaq MP.

Battiste was elected as chair of Liberal Indigenous Caucus in 2019 and has focused on increasing investment in Indigenous communities, in addition to the continued advancement of reconciliation.

Battiste has focused on environmental advocacy, with the passage of a private member's motion, M-35.

On December 3, 2021, Battiste was appointed Parliamentary Secretary to the Minister of Crown-Indigenous Relations.

During his second term, Battiste has advocated for the elimination of the Second Generation Cut-Off under the Indian Act.

In a press conference in September 2024, Battiste described Atlantic Canadians as "progressive ... kind of meat and potatoes, fisheries, EI kind of folks" after he was asked about the declining poll numbers for the Liberal Party. He later apologized for his remarks in a post on social media.

Battiste won re-election in the 2025 Canadian federal election in the riding of Cape Breton—Canso—Antigonish, defeating former deputy premier Allan MacMaster.

Battiste entered the 2025 Liberal Party of Canada leadership election, becoming the first Indigenous person to run for leader of the party. He announced his intention to run on January 13 and his registration was approved by the party's leadership vote committee. On January 30, he withdrew and endorsed former Bank of Canada and Bank of England governor Mark Carney.

On June 5, 2025 Prime Minister Mark Carney appointed Battiste as the Parliamentary Secretary to the Minister of Crown-Indigenous Relations.

== Awards and recognition ==
In 2017, Battiste was awarded the Sovereign's Medal for Volunteers.

As a musician, his band, 2nd Generation, has been nominated for multiple awards and won an East Coast Music Award in 2024.

== Electoral record ==
2025 Canadian federal election: Cape Breton—Canso—Antigonish
Party	Candidate	Votes	%	±%	Expenditures
Liberal	Jaime Battiste	24,908	51.59	+6.17	$109,835.33
Conservative	Allan MacMaster	20,870	43.23	+8.09	$89,508.34
New Democratic	Joanna Clark	1,930	4.00	–10.75	$1,390.95
People's	Ryan Smyth	333	0.69	–3.25	$38.05
Independent	Rebecca Wall	237	0.49	N/A	$0.00
Total valid votes/expense limit		48,278	99.43	+0.24	$127,777.04
Total rejected ballots		288	0.57	–0.24	
Turnout		48,556	75.57	+10.00	
Eligible voters		64,251			
Liberal hold		Swing		–1.24	
Source: Elections Canada

2021 Canadian federal election: Sydney—Victoria
Party	Candidate	Votes	%	±%	Expenditures
Liberal	Jaime Battiste	14,250	39.2	+8.3	$68,768.55
Conservative	Eddie Orrell	13,166	36.3	+8.6	none listed
New Democratic	Jeff Ward	7,217	19.9	-0.2	$11,605.07
People's	Ronald Angus Barron	1,176	3.2	N/A	$1,145.74
Green	Mark Embrett	376	1.0	-4.5	$0.00
Marxist–Leninist	Nikki Boisvert	127	0.3	N/A	$0.00
Total valid votes/expense limit		36,312	98.7	±0.0	$102,433.21
Total rejected ballots		472	1.3	±0.0	
Turnout		36,784	61.6	-6.5	
Registered voters		59,757			
Liberal hold		Swing		-0.2	
Source: Elections Canada

2019 Canadian federal election: Sydney—Victoria
Party	Candidate	Votes	%	±%	Expenditures
Liberal	Jaime Battiste	12,536	30.90	−42.30	$63,429.21
Conservative	Eddie Orrell	11,227	27.68	+17.04	none listed
New Democratic	Jodi McDavid	8,146	20.08	+7.02	none listed
Independent	Archie MacKinnon	5,679	14.00	New	none listed
Green	Lois Foster	2,249	5.54	+3.04	$0.00
Independent	Kenzie MacNeil	480	1.18	New	none listed
Veterans Coalition	Randy Joy	248	0.61	New	$0.00
Total valid votes/expense limit		40,565	98.72		$99,536.07
Total rejected ballots		528	1.28	+0.71	
Turnout		41,093	68.12	−0.84	
Eligible voters		60,322			
Liberal hold		Swing		−29.67	
Source: Elections Canada
