= Cape Breton—Canso—Antigonish =

Federal electoral district in Nova Scotia, Canada

Nova Scotia electoral district
- Interactive map of riding boundaries from the 2025 federal election

Federal electoral district
- Legislature: House of Commons
MP
Jaime Battiste
Liberal
- District created: 1996
- First contested: 1997
- Last contested: 2025
- District webpage: profile, map

Demographics
- Population (2021): 71,380
- Electors (2025): 64,263
- Area (km²): 9,308
- Pop. density (per km²): 7.7
- Census subdivision(s): Cape Breton (part), Antigonish (county), Inverness, Richmond, Victoria, Antigonish (town), Guysborough, Eskasoni, Port Hawkesbury, Mulgrave, Whycocomagh

Cape Breton—Canso—Antigonish (formerly Cape Breton—Canso) is a federal electoral district in Nova Scotia, Canada, that has been represented in the House of Commons of Canada since 2004. Its population in 2011 was 75,247. It is the successor to Bras d'Or (later known as Bras d'Or—Cape Breton), which was represented in the House of Commons from 1997 to 2004.

== Demographics ==
Historical population
Year	Pop.	±%
2001	75,221	—
2006	71,968	−4.3%
2011 (2003 redist.)	68,435	−4.9%
2011 (2015 redist.)	74,597	+9.0%
2016	71,962	−3.5%

From the 2016 census

Languages (mother tongue): 90.8% English, 6.5% French, 1.2% Mi'kmaq, 0.4% German, 0.2% Dutch, 0.1%Mandarin, 0.1% Arabic, 0.1% Scottish Gaelic, 0.1% Tagalog

Average age: 46.4

Average household size: 2.3

== Geography ==
The district includes all of Antigonish County, eastern Guysborough County, the western, southern and eastern coasts of Cape Breton Island, as well as the towns of Port Hawkesbury and Mulgrave. Communities include Glace Bay, Louisbourg, Inverness, Chéticamp, St. Peters, Guysborough, Dominion and Canso. The area is 9,438 km^{2}.

== Political geography ==
In 2008, the Liberals won most of their support on Cape Breton Island, whereas the mainland portion of the riding voted Conservative with a few Liberal and NDP pockets The Conservatives and the NDP both won a small handful of polls on the island, and the Greens won a poll containing Judique.

== History ==
The riding of Bras d'Or was created in 1996 from parts of Cape Breton Highlands—Canso and Cape Breton—East Richmond ridings.

Bras d'Or was renamed "Bras d'Or—Cape Breton" in 1998. It was abolished in 2003. Most of its territory (except for the community of Sydney River) was incorporated into a new riding called "Cape Breton—Canso", and it also added a portion of Pictou—Antigonish—Guysborough on the mainland.

Under the 2012 federal electoral redistribution, this riding gained 9% of its new territory from Central Nova.

Following the 2022 Canadian federal electoral redistribution, this riding was largely replaced by Cape Breton—Canso—Antigonish. It gained the remainder of Antigonish County from Central Nova, and exchanged territory with Sydney—Victoria, gaining Victoria, the remainder of Inverness and the rural western part of the Cape Breton Regional Municipality, and lost the urban part of the Cape Breton Regional Municipality from Sydney Forks to Morien, including the Glace Bay area. These changes came into effect upon the calling of the 2025 Canadian federal election.

=== Members of Parliament ===
Parliament	Years	Member	Party
Bras d'Or; Riding created from Cape Breton Highlands—Canso and Cape Breton—East Richmond
36th	1997–2000	Michelle Dockrill	New Democratic
Bras d'Or—Cape Breton
37th	2000–2004	Rodger Cuzner	Liberal
Cape Breton—Canso
38th	2004–2006	Rodger Cuzner	Liberal
39th	2006–2008	Rodger Cuzner	Liberal
40th	2008–2011	Rodger Cuzner	Liberal
41st	2011–2015	Rodger Cuzner	Liberal
42nd	2015–2019	Rodger Cuzner	Liberal
43rd	2019–2021	Mike Kelloway	Liberal
44th	2021–2025	Mike Kelloway	Liberal
Cape Breton—Canso—Antigonish
45th	2025–present	Jaime Battiste	Liberal

== Election results ==
=== Cape Breton—Canso—Antigonish ===
2025 Canadian federal election
Party	Candidate	Votes	%	±%	Expenditures
Liberal	Jaime Battiste	24,908	51.6	+6.17	
Conservative	Allan MacMaster	20,870	43.2	+8.09	
New Democratic	Joanna Clark	1,930	4.0	–10.75	
People's	Ryan Smyth	333	0.7	–3.25	
Independent	Rebecca Wall	237	0.5	N/A	
Total valid votes/expense limit		48,278	99.43	+0.24	127,777.04
Total rejected ballots		288	0.59	-0.22	
Turnout		48,556	75.57	+10.0	
Eligible voters		64,251			
Liberal hold		Swing		–1.24	
Source: Elections Canada

2021 federal election redistributed results
Party	Vote	%
Liberal	19,259	45.43
Conservative	14,882	35.11
New Democratic	6,252	14.75
People's	1,676	3.95
Green	206	0.49
Others	116	0.27

=== Cape Breton—Canso ===
==== 2021 ====
2021 election by polling area

2021 Canadian federal election: Cape Breton—Canso
Party	Candidate	Votes	%	±%	Expenditures
Liberal	Mike Kelloway	18,288	46.46	+7.58	$84,296.86
Conservative	Fiona MacLeod	13,805	35.07	+0.55	$87,677.71
New Democratic	Jana Reddick	5,618	14.27	-0.53	$7,070.64
People's	Brad Grandy	1,649	4.19	+2.04	$0.00
Total valid votes/expense limit		39,360	99.19	+0.57	$107,460.21
Total rejected ballots		350	0.81	-0.57	
Turnout		39,710	65.57	-6.13	
Registered voters		60,559			
Liberal hold		Swing		+3.52	
Source: Elections Canada

==== 2019 ====
2019 Canadian federal election: Cape Breton—Canso
Party	Candidate	Votes	%	±%	Expenditures
Liberal	Mike Kelloway	16,694	38.88	-35.51	none listed
Conservative	Alfie MacLeod	14,821	34.52	+20.07	$99,102.26
New Democratic	Laurie Suitor	6,354	14.80	+6.59	none listed
Green	Clive Doucet	3,321	7.73	+4.77	$23,886.83
People's	Billy Joyce	925	2.15	-	$0.00
Independent	Michelle Dockrill	685	1.60	-	none listed
National Citizens Alliance	Darlene Lynn LeBlanc	140	0.33	-	$0.00
Total valid votes/expense limit		42,940	98.62		$102,831.89
Total rejected ballots		601	1.38	+0.75	
Turnout		43,541	71.73	+0.15	
Eligible voters		60,699			
Liberal hold		Swing		-27.79	
Source: Elections Canada

==== 2015 ====
2015 Canadian federal election: Cape Breton—Canso
Party	Candidate	Votes	%	±%	Expenditures
Liberal	Rodger Cuzner	32,163	74.39	+30.29	$69,357.97
Conservative	Adam Daniel Rodgers	6,246	14.45	–18.17	$36,970.92
New Democratic	Michelle Smith	3,547	8.20	–11.84	$3,803.75
Green	Maria Goretti Coady	1,281	2.96	–0.28	–
Total valid votes/expense limit		43,237	99.37		$205,381.80
Total rejected ballots		274	0.63		
Turnout		43,511	71.58		
Eligible voters		60,785			
Liberal hold		Swing		+24.23	
Source: Elections Canada

2011 federal election redistributed results
Party	Vote	%
Liberal	17,196	44.10
Conservative	12,719	32.62
New Democratic	7,818	20.05
Green	1,265	3.24

==== 2011 ====
2011 Canadian federal election: Cape Breton—Canso
Party	Candidate	Votes	%	±%	Expenditures
Liberal	Rodger Cuzner	16,478	46.45	-1.65	$63,928.72
Conservative	Clarence Derrick Kennedy	10,873	30.65	+7.15	$75,474.80
New Democratic	Marney Simmons	6,984	19.69	-1.43	$2,528.46
Green	Glen Carabin	1,141	3.22	-4.06	$346.95
Total valid votes/expense limit		35,476	100.0		$83,274.40
Total rejected, unmarked and declined ballots		336	0.94	+0.14	
Turnout		35,812	62.47	-0.84	
Eligible voters		57,331			
Liberal hold		Swing		-4.40	

==== 2008 ====
2008 Canadian federal election: Cape Breton—Canso
Party	Candidate	Votes	%	±%	Expenditures
Liberal	Rodger Cuzner	17,447	48.10	-5.09	$35,405.44
Conservative	Allan Murphy	8,524	23.50	-0.68	$51,511.90
New Democratic	Mark MacNeill	7,660	21.12	+0.98	$6,483.40
Green	Dwayne MacEachern	2,641	7.28	+4.78	$5,315.05
Total valid votes/expense limit		36,272	100.0		$80,776
Total rejected, unmarked and declined ballots		292	0.80	+0.09	
Turnout		36,564	63.31	-3.21	
Eligible voters		57,753			
Liberal hold		Swing		-2.20	

==== 2006 ====
2006 Canadian federal election: Cape Breton—Canso
Party	Candidate	Votes	%	±%	Expenditures
Liberal	Rodger Cuzner	21,424	53.19	-0.07	$62,038.40
Conservative	Kenzie MacNeil	9,740	24.18	+3.94	$47,590.43
New Democratic	Hector Morrison	8,111	20.14	-4.18	$7,662.93
Green	Rob Hines	1,006	2.50	+0.33	$323.17
Total valid votes/expense limit		40,281	100.0		$76,321
Total rejected, unmarked and declined ballots		288	0.71	-0.24	
Turnout		40,569	66.52	+2.72	
Eligible voters		60,984			
Liberal hold		Swing		-2.00	

==== 2004 ====
2004 Canadian federal election: Cape Breton—Canso
Party	Candidate	Votes	%	±%	Expenditures
Liberal	Rodger Cuzner	20,139	53.26	-0.33	$63,078.17
New Democratic	Shirley Hartery	9,197	24.32	+5.44	$21,160.51
Conservative	Kenzie MacNeil	7,654	20.24	-7.19	$49,919.36
Green	Seumas Gibson	820	2.17	–	none listed
Total valid votes/expense limit		37,810	100.0		$73,856
Total rejected, unmarked and declined ballots		361	0.95		
Turnout		38,171	63.80	-3.38	
Eligible voters		59,825			
Liberal notional hold		Swing		-2.88	
Changes from 2000 are based on redistributed results. Conservative Party change is based on the combination of Canadian Alliance and Progressive Conservative Party totals.

2000 federal election redistributed results
Party	Vote	%
Liberal	21,200	53.59
Progressive Conservative	9,291	23.49
New Democratic	7,469	18.88
Alliance	1,558	3.94
Others	42	0.11

=== Bras d'Or–Cape Breton ===
==== 2000 ====
2000 Canadian federal election: Cape Breton—Canso
Party	Candidate	Votes	%	±%
Liberal	Rodger Cuzner	20,815	54.85	+16.41
Progressive Conservative	Alfie MacLeod	8,114	21.38	+1.12
New Democratic	Michelle Dockrill	7,537	19.86	-21.44
Alliance	John Currie	1,483	3.91	–
Total valid votes		37,949	100.00	
Liberal gain from New Democratic		Swing		+18.93

=== Bras d'Or ===
==== 1997 ====
1997 Canadian federal election: Cape Breton—Canso
Party	Candidate	Votes	%
New Democratic	Michelle Dockrill	17,575	41.30
Liberal	David Dingwall	16,358	38.44
Progressive Conservative	Frank Crowdis	8,620	20.26
Total valid votes		42,553	100.00

== See also ==
- List of Canadian electoral districts
- Historical federal electoral districts of Canada
