= Darren Fisher =

Canadian Liberal politician

The Honourable Darren Fisher PC MP
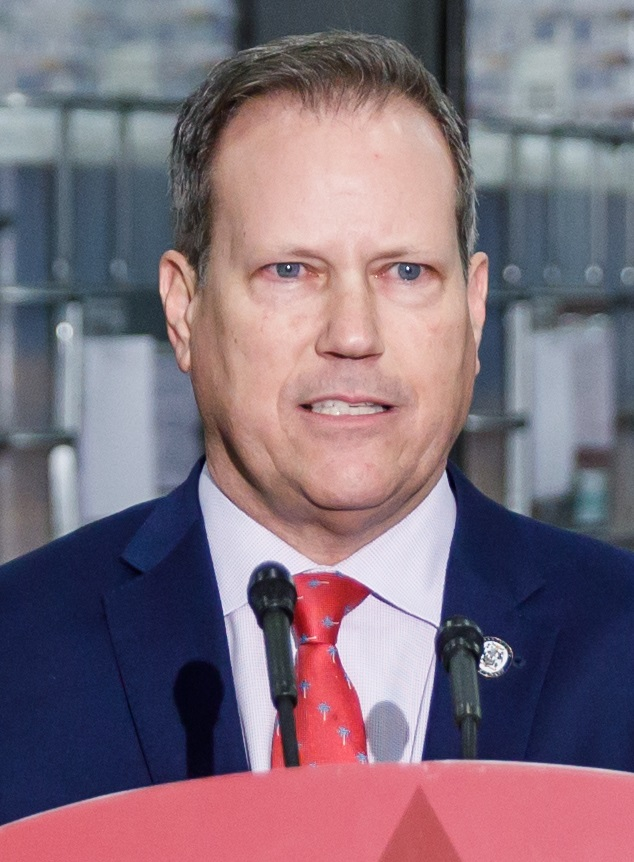
- Fisher in 2019

Chair of the National Security and Intelligence Committee of Parliamentarians
- Incumbent
- Assumed office September 18, 2025
- Prime Minister: Mark Carney
- Preceded by: Patricia Lattanzio

Minister of Veterans Affairs Associate Minister of National Defence
- In office December 20, 2024 – March 14, 2025
- Prime Minister: Justin Trudeau
- Preceded by: Ginette Petitpas Taylor
- Succeeded by: Élisabeth Brière

Member of Parliament for Dartmouth—Cole Harbour
- Incumbent
- Assumed office October 19, 2015
- Preceded by: Robert Chisholm

Member of Halifax Regional Council
- In office October 20, 2012 – October 23, 2015
- Preceded by: District established
- Succeeded by: Tony Mancini
- Constituency: District 6 Harbourview - Burnside - Dartmouth East
- In office 19 September 2009 – October 20, 2012
- Preceded by: Andrew Younger
- Succeeded by: District dissolved
- Constituency: District 6 East Dartmouth - The Lakes

Personal details
- Born: September 10, 1965 (age 61) Dartmouth, Nova Scotia, Canada
- Party: Liberal
- Spouse: Anne Fisher
- Profession: Business owner
- Website: Official website

Darren Fisher (born September 10, 1965) is a Canadian politician who has been the member of Parliament (MP) for Dartmouth—Cole Harbour since 2015. A member of the Liberal Party, Fisher was the minister of veterans affairs and associate minister of national defence from December 2024 to March 2025. He has served as the chair of the National Security and Intelligence Committee of Parliamentarians (NSICOP) since 2025. Fisher served on Halifax Regional Council from 2009 to 2015.

== Political career ==
Fisher was elected to Parliament in 2015. He was the parliamentary secretary to the minister of health from 2019 to 2021, to the minister of economic development and official languages for the Atlantic Canada Opportunities Agency from March to August 2021, to the minister of seniors from 2021 to 2023, and to the associate minister of health and minister of mental health and addictions from 2023 to 2024. Fisher was a member of the National Security and Intelligence Committee of Parliamentarians (NSICOP) April to December 2024. He became chair of NSICOP in 2025.

Fisher joined Cabinet on December 20, 2024, when he was appointed Minister of Veterans Affairs and Associate Minister of National Defence. His appointment came as Prime Minister Justin Trudeau shuffled Cabinet following the resignation of Chrystia Freeland, who was Deputy Prime Minister and Minister of Finance, as well as several other ministers. Fisher was dropped from cabinet on March 14, 2025, upon the formation of the 30th Canadian Ministry led by Mark Carney. Carney named him to be chair of the National Security and Intelligence Committee of Parliamentarians on September 18, 2025.

At the time of the 2025 Canadian federal election, he lived in Dartmouth, Nova Scotia.

== Electoral record ==
2025 Canadian federal election: Dartmouth—Cole Harbour
Party	Candidate	Votes	%	±%	Expenditures
Liberal	Darren Fisher	40,367	67.69	+16.19	$67,639.92
Conservative	Isabelle Obeid	13,557	22.73	+19.86	$58,425.99
New Democratic	Keith Morrison	4,201	7.04	-25.93	$42,365.71
People's	Michelle Lindsay	750	1.26	-8.49	$13,340.38
Green	Rana Zaman	628	1.05	-1.86	$2,402.47
Libertarian	Joseph Shea	131	0.22	N/A	$0.00
Total valid votes/expense limit		59,634	99.49	+1.2	$129,625.65
Total rejected ballots		305	0.51	-1.2	
Turnout		59,939	71.50	+10.3	
Eligible voters		83,825			
Liberal notional hold		Swing		-1.84	
Source: Elections Canada
Note: number of eligible voters does not include voting day registrations.

2021 Canadian federal election: Dartmouth—Cole Harbour
Party	Candidate	Votes	%	±%	Expenditures
Liberal	Darren Fisher	24,209	53.06	+7.71	$57,490.92
New Democratic	Kevin Payne	15,267	33.46	+6.48	$22,178.20
People's	Michelle Lindsay	4,781	10.48	+8.82	$17,988.11
Green	Rana Zaman	1,371	3.00	-6.86	$2,272.30
Total valid votes/expense limit		45,628	98.29		$109,028.39
Total rejected ballots		796	1.71	+0.97	
Turnout		46,424	61.17	-8.48	
Eligible voters		75,898			
Liberal hold		Swing		+0.62	
Source: Elections Canada

2019 Canadian federal election: Dartmouth—Cole Harbour
Party	Candidate	Votes	%	±%	Expenditures
Liberal	Darren Fisher	24,259	45.34	-11.89	$67,276.38
New Democratic	Emma Norton	14,435	26.98	+2.57	$39,533.04
Conservative	Jason Cole	8,638	16.15	+2.12	$41,695.00
Green	Lil MacPherson	5,280	9.87	+6.47	none listed
People's	Michelle Lindsay	887	1.66		$2,485.00
Total valid votes/expense limit		53,499	99.25	–	$104,062.96
Total rejected ballots		404	0.75		
Turnout		53,903	69.65		
Eligible voters		77,390			
Liberal hold		Swing		-7.26	
Source: Elections Canada

2015 Canadian federal election: Dartmouth—Cole Harbour
Party	Candidate	Votes	%	±%	Expenditures
Liberal	Darren Fisher	30,407	58.17	+23.45	$64,958.30
New Democratic	Robert Chisholm	12,757	24.41	–12.02	$137,358.97
Conservative	Jason Cole	7,331	14.03	–11.00	$52,263.31
Green	Brynn Nheiley	1,775	3.40	–0.43	$723.31
Total valid votes/expense limit		52,270	99.62		$205,945.13
Total rejected ballots		201	0.38		
Turnout		52,471	71.81		
Eligible voters		73,066			
Liberal gain from New Democratic		Swing		+17.73	
Source: Elections Canada

2012 District 6, Halifax election
Candidate	Votes	%	±
Darren Fisher (Incumbent)	4,518	69.50	
Jerry Pye	1,983	30.50	
