= National Citizens Alliance =

Federal political party in Canada (2014–2023)

National Citizens Alliance Alliance Nationale des Citoyens
- Former federal political party
- Abbreviation: NCA
- Founder: Stephen Garvey
- Founded: November 18, 2014
- Dissolved: February 28, 2023
- Ideology: Canadian nationalism; Right-wing populism; Right-wing anti-globalism; Anti-immigration; Anti-Islam
- Political position: Far-right

Website
- www.nationalcitizensalliance.ca

The National Citizens Alliance (Note: Formerly known as the: Democratic Advancement Party of Canada (2014–2017); National Advancement Party of Canada (2017–2019)) (French: Alliance Nationale des Citoyens) was a minor federal political party in Canada, registered with Elections Canada from 2014 to 2017 and from 2019 to 2023. It was founded and led by perennial candidate Stephen Garvey, a proponent of far-right conspiracy theories. The party itself was described by multiple sources as far-right, alt-right, anti-immigration, and Islamophobic.

== Leader ==
The party was led by Stephen Garvey, a perennial candidate and advocate of far-right conspiracy theories. He believes in the Great Replacement conspiracy theory and has asserted there is a deliberate plot to demographically replace European Canadians in Canada. He was an associate of the anti-immigration group Worldwide Coalition Against Islam (WCAI) before publicly cutting ties with the group in June 2017. He was the lead organizer of a March 2017 protest in Calgary against Motion 103 (M-103), a non-binding resolution in the federal House of Commons which condemned Islamophobia and all other forms of systemic racism and religious discrimination. Garvey dismisses the existence of Islamophobia as "complete nonsense ... created in the 1990s by the Muslim Brotherhood for the sole reason to silence criticism on Islam."

Garvey was the spokesperson for a May 2017 protest in Red Deer, Alberta, which claimed that Syrian refugee students at Lindsay Thurber Comprehensive High School were given more lenient punishments for participating in a fight than other students. The allegations were false, as school officials and local police confirmed all eight students received the same punishment of suspension for one week.

In June 2017, Garvey led a protest by his party against the Calgary City Council after it revoked the special event permit for the party's "Say No to Hate and Racism Festival", which the city council viewed as "anti-Muslim and Islamophobic" and other observers characterized as "anti-Islam". Garvey and other party members attempted to hold another protest later that month but were disrupted by anti-fascist counter-protesters.

In August 2019, Garvey was charged with offences under the Criminal Code and Canada Elections Act for providing false information to the Chief Electoral Officer of Canada and circumventing election contribution limits.

In September 2019, Garvey published a video of himself following Ontario MPP Gurratan Singh around MuslimFest in Mississauga and demanding to know if Singh supported political Islam. Garvey was later escorted out of the event by security. Singh denounced the encounter as racist, while other politicians, including then prime minister Justin Trudeau and federal opposition leader Andrew Scheer, released statements condemning racism and discrimination in response to the video.

== Ideology and policies ==
Multiple sources described the NCA as far-right, alt-right, anti-immigration, and Islamophobic. Omar Mosleh and Melanie Green, writing for the StarMetro, described the party as "far-right populist", while protesters against the NCA in Halifax denounced the party as "white nationalist". The party, however, asserted that it was "neither left nor right" because it adopted policies from both sides of the political spectrum.

The NCA described itself as a "true populist, nationalist, pro-Canadian and anti-globalist" party. The party's platform proposed amending the Canadian Charter of Rights and Freedoms to include the preservation of "European-Canadian heritage". As such, it supported the preservation of Quebecois culture; however, it opposed Quebec independence and instead advocated for greater cooperation between the federal government and Quebec provincial government. The party opposed multiculturalism in Canada and proposed repealing the Canadian Multiculturalism Act. It voiced opposition to the idea of a post-national state in particular.

The NCA proposed reducing immigration to Canada, arguing that the immigration was too high for proper screening and vetting. The party also proposed restricting or halting immigration from countries with "strong terrorist activities" or countries that, in the party's view, do not share Canadian values. In addition, the party advocated for the deportation of all refugee claimants who entered Canada through the United States as part of the Safe Third Country Agreement between the two countries.

The NCA was socially conservative. It proposed a ban on abortions after the first trimester (three months) of pregnancy. It advocated the prohibition of "schools and any other relevant organizations/institutions from exposing children to indoctrination [on] sexual identity".

The party supported gun rights and described the firearms regulation in Canada as excessive and ineffective.

The party proposed stricter penalties for animal cruelty and redefining bestiality under the criminal code, which prohibits the sexual penetration of animals by humans but not the other way around.

=== Conspiracy theories ===
Garvey is known for his outspoken support of far-right conspiracy theories, and in turn the party's platform reflected his beliefs. The NCA supported the Great Replacement conspiracy theory and asserted there was a plot between "globalists" and "cultural Marxists" to replace European Canadians with "Third World immigrants". Muslims and Sikhs in particular were frequent targets of the party's anti-immigration rhetoric. In early 2021, the NCA released a statement denouncing its coverage on Wikipedia, claiming that "communists and Marxists" had been paid by mainstream media to spread misinformation about the party on the site.

The NCA also supported various anti-science conspiracy theories. It supported the chemtrail conspiracy theory and asserted the chemicals released were being used to deflect sunlight. The party claimed that 5G radio waves caused adverse health effects and 5G technology was being used by the federal government for mass surveillance. The party did not accept the scientific consensus on climate change and dismissed it as "globalist alarmism".

== Electoral history ==
The party was first registered with Elections Canada in August 2015 under the name Democratic Advancement Party of Canada (DAPC). As the DAPC, it fielded four candidates in the 2015 federal election. Garvey ran in Calgary Skyview and received 1.5% of the vote, Fahed Khalid received 0.17% of the vote in Bow River, Max Veress received 0.33% of the vote in Calgary Forest Lawn, and Faizan Butt received 0.34% of the vote in Calgary Nose Hill. No candidate was elected.

In January 2017, the DAPC renamed itself the National Advancement Party of Canada (NAPC). It ran two candidates under the new name in the Calgary by-elections of April 2017: Garvey was the candidate in Calgary Heritage (79 votes, 0.3%) and Kulbir Singh Chawla was the candidate in Calgary Midnapore (81 votes, 0.3%). The NAPC voluntarily deregistered itself on December 31, 2017.

Garvey reregistered the party in January 2019 under its third and final name, the National Citizens Alliance (NCA). The NCA four candidates in the 2019 federal election and received 510 votes overall. It voluntarily deregistered itself once again on February 28, 2023.

Canadian federal election results
Election	Leader	Votes	%	Seats	+/−	Position	Status
2015	Stephen Garvey	1,187	0.01	0 / 338	Steady	15th	No seats
2019	Stephen Garvey	510	0.00	0 / 338	Steady	▼19th	No seats
2021	Stephen Garvey	476	0.00	0 / 338	Steady	19th	No seats
