= 2017 United Express passenger removal =

2017 aviation incident in Illinois

2017 United Express passenger removal United Express Flight 3411
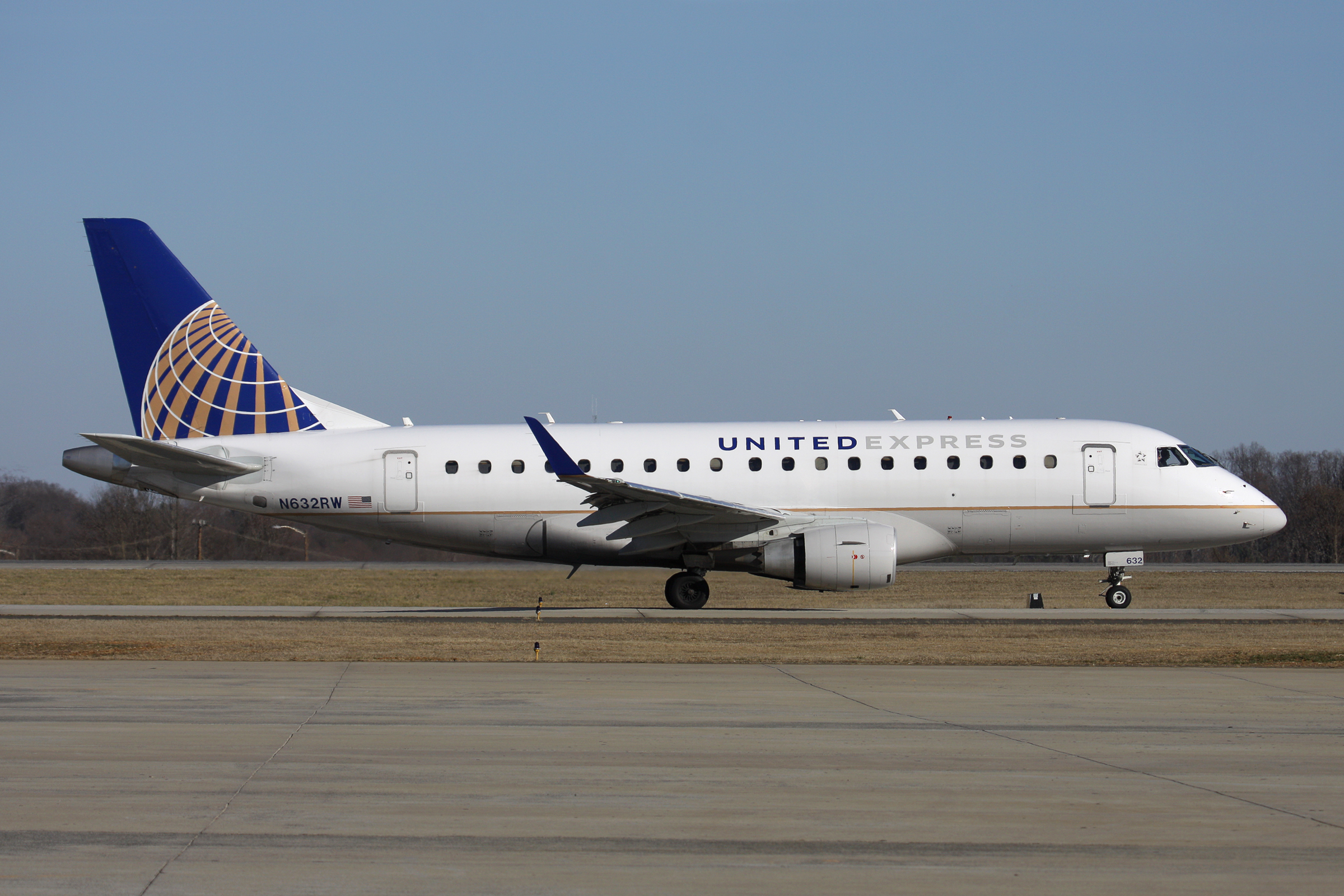
- N632RW, the aircraft involved in the incident, pictured in 2014

Incident
- Date: April 9, 2017
- Summary: Passenger injury due to forced removal
- Arrests: None
- Litigation: Lawsuit settled for undisclosed amount
- Site: O'Hare International Airport, Chicago, Illinois, United States

Aircraft
- Aircraft type: Embraer 170
- Operator: Republic Airways on behalf of United Express
- Call sign: BRICKYARD 3411
- Registration: N632RW
- Flight origin: O'Hare International Airport, Chicago
- Destination: Louisville International Airport, Louisville, Kentucky
- Occupants: 74
- Passengers: 70
- Crew: 4
- Fatalities: 0
- Injuries: 1
- Survivors: 74

On April 9, 2017, at Chicago O'Hare International Airport, four paying customers were selected to be involuntarily deplaned from United Express Flight 3411 to make room for four deadheading employees. One of these passengers was David Dao, 69, a Vietnamese-American physician who was injured when he was physically assaulted and forcefully removed from the flight by Chicago Department of Aviation security officers. Dao, a pulmonologist, refused to leave his seat when directed because he needed to see patients the following day. In the process of removing him, the security officers struck his face against an armrest, then dragged him – bloodied, bruised, and unconscious – by his arms down the aircraft aisle, past rows of onlooking passengers. The incident is widely characterized by critics – and later by United Airlines itself – as an example of mishandled customer service.

A video of the incident recorded by passengers went viral on social media, resulting in anger over the use of force shown. Politicians expressed concern and called for an official investigation. Shares of United stock dipped as much as 2.5% in pre-market trading Monday following the Sunday incident, but closed the day up nearly 1%.

United CEO Oscar Munoz issued a statement the following day that appeared to downplay the treatment of Dao, referring to the incident as "re-accommodating the customers". Munoz also sent an email to United staff commending the crew's actions for following established procedures and referring to Dao as "disruptive" and "belligerent". This was contradicted by passengers' accounts and video of the incident; for example, fellow passenger Jason Powell asserted that Dao was not belligerent, saying instead, "He was very polite, matter-of-fact."

Munoz and United were sharply criticized for their initial statements. Two days after the incident, Munoz issued an additional statement, apologizing and promising that such an incident would never again occur on a United aircraft. He said, "No one should ever be mistreated this way." In a televised interview, Munoz was asked, "Do you think [Dao] was at fault in any way?" Munoz responded, "No. He can't be. He was a paying passenger sitting on our seat in our aircraft." Munoz's previously planned promotion to become United's chairman was delayed until May 2020 as a result of the incident. Dao reached an "amicable" settlement with United on April 27, 2017, though its terms were not publicly announced.

== Incident ==
=== Overbooking ===
On April 9, 2017, four employees of Republic Airways – a regional airline contracted by United Airlines – located at the time in Chicago, had been assigned to crew a flight leaving the next day from Louisville. They were originally scheduled to travel to Louisville on United Express Flight 4448 at 14:55 CDT, but the aircraft operating that flight was experiencing a significant mechanical delay. They were rebooked onto Flight 3411 at 17:21, 19 minutes before its scheduled departure time of 17:40 CDT and after the passengers had boarded the aircraft, an Embraer 170, which was fully occupied.

Passengers were initially offered $400 in travel vouchers, a hotel stay, and a seat on a flight leaving more than 21 hours later if they would voluntarily give up their seats. With no volunteers, the offer was increased to $800 in vouchers to no avail. Just before 17:40 CDT, the United Express gate agent announced that four passengers would be selected by computer and involuntarily removed to accommodate the four Republic employees. A United spokesperson later stated that the selection is based on several factors, and that frequent fliers and higher-paying customers are less likely to be chosen. Another spokesman stated that the flight was not overbooked prior to the four employees being assigned to it.

=== Passenger removal ===
Three of the selected passengers, a couple and a woman thought to be David Dao's wife, cooperated with the direction to leave the aircraft. The fourth, 69-year-old David Dao – a doctor from Elizabethtown, Kentucky and former folk musician, was initially cooperative but declined upon learning that the flight which he would be rescheduled onto would not leave until the next day, protesting that he needed to see patients the next day at his clinic. United Airlines staff requested assistance from the Chicago Department of Aviation Security, a department with powers differing from those of the Chicago Police Department; for example, its officers cannot file arrest reports.

Dao refused to leave his seat and initially screamed as he was forcefully removed, then fell silent as he apparently lost consciousness. In the process, he suffered injuries to his head and mouth when, according to another passenger, aviation security officer James Long threw him against the armrest before dragging him down the aisle by his arms, apparently unconscious. During the altercation, several passengers distressed by the incident voluntarily left the aircraft. Passengers stated that officers laughed as Dao was dragged from the plane. The four United employees then sat in the vacated seats. Shortly afterward, Dao boarded the aircraft again with blood coming from his mouth, repeatedly saying "I have to go home" and "just kill me". After he collapsed in a seat, he was removed from the aircraft on a stretcher. The remaining passengers were then directed to exit the plane while the blood was cleaned up. Several passengers recorded the event on video using phone cameras and the videos were widely circulated on social media. Another passenger reported hearing Dao claim that he had been chosen because of his Asian ethnicity. Dao was taken to a hospital with non-life-threatening injuries, including a broken nose, loss of two front teeth, sinus injuries, and "a significant concussion"; the injuries required reconstructive surgery, according to Dao's lawyer.

The flight departed at 19:21 CDT and arrived at Louisville at 21:01 EDT.

=== Passenger assessments ===
Several passengers stated that the situation escalated quickly and was inflamed by the demeanor of a United employee. According to passenger Tyler Bridges, "An airline supervisor walked onto the plane and brusquely announced, 'We have United employees that need to fly to Louisville tonight. ... This flight's not leaving until four people get off.' That rubbed some people the wrong way." Passenger John Fuller described the employee's behavior and said, "She was very terse. ... She said, 'Four people need to get off this plane, or we're not going anywhere.'" Passenger Jason Powell corroborated this account and said that he did not understand why the employee had spoken with such a belligerent tone: "The tone immediately turned me off ... She accelerated the situation. It was poor leadership." Powell said, "The disgusting mishandling of the situation included everyone from the rude ticket agent who demanded that this man give up his seat on the flight United overbooked ..."

Passenger John Klaassen later said, "after the first offer was made, the United employee left and it escalated ... had they just tried some diplomacy, none of this had to take place ... they were unwilling to negotiate." Passenger Mary Myers faulted the supervisor, saying, "I really put all of this on her shoulders. She could have made a difference. She could have handled it differently. She's the one who started it all." Myers also indicated that Dao had pleaded with the supervisor not to remove him from the flight and explained that as a doctor he could not miss his return flight home. "He said, 'I can’t get off the plane. I have to get home. I'm a doctor. I have to get to the hospital in the morning.'" Myers stated that her response was not appropriate: "She said, 'Well, then I'll just have to call the police and have you escorted off the plane.' In my opinion, I think any good supervisor would never have let the situation escalate to that point. Honestly, I think I blame her for the whole entire occurrence. She didn't need to jump to that level."

== Aftermath ==
On April 11, 2017, the law firms representing Dao, Golan Christie Taglia and Corboy & Demetrio, issued a statement indicating that Dao and his family "wants the world to know that they are very appreciative of the outpouring of prayers, concern and support".

The three Chicago Department of Aviation (CDA) officers who responded to the incident were James Long, Mauricio Rodriguez Jr., and Steven Smith. Their supervisor was Sergeant John Moore. Long had just returned to the job after a suspension for insubordination after having ignored a supervisor's orders to prevent vehicles from driving into a restricted area of the airport. Long was placed on administrative leave soon after the incident with Dao; Rodriguez and Smith were placed on administrative leave on April 12. Moore was placed on administrative leave on April 19. Moore had been disciplined at least seven times from 1999 to 2009 for failing to arrive at work without notifying a supervisor. The Chicago Department of Aviation said that "the incident on United Flight 3411 was not in accordance with our standard operating procedure and the actions of the aviation security officer are obviously not condoned by the Department ..." The aviation police receive more training and higher pay compared to that received by private security guards, but less than that of officers of the Chicago Police Department.

City Inspector General Joseph Ferguson launched an investigation shortly after the incident. The Office of Inspector General (OIG) released its findings on October 17, 2017, establishing that the four officers had violated City of Chicago personnel rules. The report stated:

Specifically, the first ASO violated the CDA Use of Force Policy when that ASO escalated a non-threatening situation into a physically violent one by forcefully removing a passenger from the aircraft. The ASO's use of excessive force caused the passenger to hit his face on an armrest, resulting in the passenger sustaining a concussion, a broken nose, and the loss of two teeth. OIG's investigation also established that the second ASO made misleading statements in two reports and the third ASO made material omissions in a report, regarding the first ASO's forceful removal of the passenger from the aircraft. The investigation further established that the Sergeant deliberately removed material facts from the third ASO's "To/From Report" and approved reports without all essential information.

In response to the OIG report, the CDA discharged Long and Moore and issued five-day suspensions to Rodriguez and Smith.

=== Airport security changes ===
On June 29, 2017, the Illinois Law Enforcement Training and Standards Board decertified the Chicago Department of Aviation Police, stating the agency is "in no way" a police agency, merely a security force. The Chicago Police Department was designated as the primary responders to all future airport disturbance calls. The union representing the 300-officer department, Service Employees International Union (SEIU) Local 73, challenged the downgrade from police to security status in an unfair labor practices complaint.

Following a review prompted by the incident, in July 2017 the Chicago Department of Aviation reported that its unsworn, unarmed airport security personnel were not actually police officers under Illinois law. Their uniforms, badges and vehicles had been "improperly" labeled "police" for historical reasons. It promised that the incorrect insignia would be removed within months.

=== Social media ===
External videos
- @Tyler_Bridges (April 9, 2017). "@united @FoxNews @CNN not a good way to treat a Doctor trying to get to work because they overbooked" (Tweet) – via Twitter.
- @JayseDavid (April 9, 2017). "@United overbook #flight3411 and decided to force random passengers off the plane. Here's how they did it" (Tweet) – via Twitter.
- @Tyler_Bridges (April 9, 2017). "@united @CNN @FoxNews @WHAS11 Man forcibly removed from plane somehow gets back on still bloody from being removed" (Tweet) – via Twitter.
- @kaylyn_davis (April 9, 2017). "#flythefriendlyskies my husband was on that flight. Screw you United!! @united" (Tweet) – via Twitter.
- @kaylyn_davis (April 9, 2017). "#flythefriendlyskies @united no words. This poor man!!" (Tweet) – via Twitter.

Video footage from passengers who remained on the aircraft throughout the incident was widely shared and was picked up by mainstream media agencies. One such video was shared 87,000 times and viewed 6.8 million times in less than a day.

The victim was initially thought to be Chinese-American, as one of the witnesses told The Washington Post, "He said, more or less, 'I'm being selected because I'm Chinese.'" His daughter, Crystal Dao Pepper, later said in a press conference that her father was Vietnamese-Chinese. The incident drew outrage on mainland Chinese and Vietnamese social media, and became the number-one trending topic on the Chinese microblogging site Weibo, attracting the attention of more than 480 million users. An article in Foreign Policy noted the racial and political reasons for the wide spread of the video throughout the mainland Chinese mediasphere, where heated debates take place over the nature of America's political system and its relations with mainland China, and asserted that the video would serve the ends of the authorities and critics of America in challenging America's cultural sway in mainland China. In Vietnam, there were also negative reactions to the reporting into Dao's past, which was viewed as irrelevant and possibly racist.

The incident had taken place shortly after another controversy in which United refused boarding to two teenage girls wearing leggings. There were calls by social media users across the world, especially those in the United States, mainland China and Vietnam, to boycott United Airlines. Customers of the airline posted pictures of their United loyalty or credit cards cut into pieces. Another petition called on the U.S. federal government to launch an investigation into the incident, invoking the Black Lives Matter movement by using the hashtag "#ChineseLivesMatter."

=== Stock market ===
Shares of United Continental Holdings (UAL), the parent company of United Airlines, had closed at $70.88 on April 7. On April 10, the first trading day after the incident, they rose by 0.9% to close at $71.52. Shares declined by 1.1% on April 11, closing at $70.71, only $0.17 or 0.2% less than the April 7 closing price. Shares closed at $69.93 on April 12, $69.07 on April 13, and declined to $67.75 on April 18.

Research analysts S3 Partners commented on the effect the incident would have on UAL's future financial performance, saying that "consumers might not have much choice but to fly UAL due to airline consolidation, which has reduced competition over most routes. As a result, with passengers having fewer options these days when it comes to carriers, UAL's revenues may not suffer as much as expected unless passengers opt for longer and more expensive flights." Analysts Wolfe Research and Cowen & Co. were also confident of future performance.

Investor Warren Buffett, a major investor in airline stocks, said that United made a "terrible mistake", and that public perceptions were influenced by the CEO's initial reaction.

=== Consumer preference ===
A poll of 1,900 people conducted three days after the incident suggested that all else being equal, 79% of prospective fliers who had heard of the incident would choose a non–United Airlines flight. 44% would choose a non–United Airlines flight even if it cost US$66 more and took an additional three hours.

Despite calls for a boycott, United Airlines reported 39% greater profits over the previous year in the second quarter of 2017, as well as increased sales. Economist John Kwoka Jr. attributed this to the high level of consolidation of American airlines, with a majority of flights controlled by four corporations—United, Delta, American, and Southwest—making a boycott impractical. Additionally, for many travelers, ticket price is the primary deciding factor when booking flights, outweighing other considerations, such as customer service.

=== Industry behavior ===
In August 2017, data from the U.S. Department of Transportation showed that bumped-passenger rates were at their lowest since 1995. The rate "markedly decreased" starting in April 2017 (the same month this incident occurred) from 0.62 per 10,000 passengers, to 0.44 per 10,000 in the second quarter of 2017.

== Responses ==
=== United Airlines ===
On April 9, United issued a statement: "Flight 3411 from Chicago to Louisville was overbooked. After our team looked for volunteers, one customer refused to leave the aircraft voluntarily and law enforcement was asked to come to the gate. We apologize for the overbook situation. Further details on the removed customer should be directed to authorities." By April 11, United changed its prior statement, stating that the flight was in fact not overbooked, but sold out, and the four employees who needed the seats were considered "must-ride" passengers who had to travel to another city to work as aircraft crew.

United CEO Oscar Munoz stated on April 10: "This is an upsetting event to all of us here at United. I apologize for having to re-accommodate these customers. Our team is moving with a sense of urgency to work with the authorities and conduct our own detailed review of what happened. We are also reaching out to this passenger to talk directly to him and further address and resolve this situation." Munoz's use of the word "re-accommodate" received particular attention and ridicule from social media and commentators. The words "re-accommodate" and "re-accommodated" appear several times in the text of the standard United Airlines Contract of Carriage.

Later on April 10, in an e-mail to employees, Munoz praised and defended the crew's actions, while claiming the passenger was "disruptive and belligerent". He stated that "Our employees followed established procedures for dealing with situations like this." This led to an online petition calling for his resignation.

In a subsequent public statement released by United on the afternoon of April 11, 2017, Munoz was more conciliatory. His note described the Dao incident as "truly horrific" and expressed an understanding of the "outrage, anger, disappointment" felt by many. He took full responsibility and apologized, adding that "No one should ever be mistreated this way." He promised to conduct a thorough review and release a report by April 30. The public statement ended with "I promise you we will do better."

During a television interview on April 12, Munoz announced that, effective immediately, United Airlines would no longer use police in involuntary bumping situations: "We're not going to put a law enforcement official ... [onto a United aircraft] to remove a booked, paid, seated passenger." He apologized to Dao and his family and said, "That is not who our family at United is. You saw us at a bad moment; this can and will never happen again on a United Airlines flight. That is my promise." Asked if Dao was at fault in any way, Munoz hesitated, then replied, "No, he can't be ... no one should be treated that way, period."

In response to a signed petition, Munoz said he did not intend to resign.

Three days after the incident, United Airlines elected to provide all passengers aboard United Express Flight 3411 compensation equal to the cost of their tickets. An email obtained by CNN stated that this compensation was in the form of a $500 voucher toward future travel on United Airlines. The email also indicated that customers were eligible for the voucher if they "released" the airline from lawsuits. A United spokesperson later indicated that passengers would not be required to agree to those terms. On April 13, 2017, United internally announced a policy change to ensure that flight crews are booked "at least 60 minutes prior to departure." On April 18, Munoz reported that no one would be fired as a result of the incident.

On April 21, it was reported that Munoz would not become chairman of the airline, as had been planned, because of the incident. Munoz's employment agreement was amended subsequent to the incident to reflect that he would not be elevated to chairman. In a government filing, United said that the airline was developing a program for 2017 so that compensation was "directly and meaningfully tied to progress in improving the customer experience". In 2019, Munoz announced his impending transfer from United, to become chairman of parent company United Airlines Holdings.

United and Dao reached a confidential settlement on April 27. Although the financial terms of the settlement remain confidential, one of the stipulations of the settlement was that Dao could not sue the city of Chicago. At the same time, the airline announced ten policy changes in response to the incident. These included raising the maximum amount of travel vouchers to passengers "bounced" from flights to up to $10,000 and a $1,500 "no questions asked" fee for permanently lost luggage, and the airline promised to reduce overbooking.

=== Public relations professionals ===
The handling of the incident by Munoz was described as a "fumbling response" by Bloomberg News, part of a "public-relations disaster" for United. Munoz had been named "Communicator of the Year for 2017" by PRWeek in March 2017. Steve Barrett, editor-in-chief of PRWeek US, later noted: "It's fair to say that if PRWeek was choosing its Communicator of the Year now, we would not be awarding it to Oscar Munoz ... In time, the episode and subsequent response will be quoted in textbooks as an example of how not to respond in a crisis." Public relations expert Rupert Younger, director of the Oxford University Centre for Corporate Reputation, called the handling of the situation "a major disappointment". In Younger's view, Munoz should have moved more quickly and been more genuinely apologetic from the start. Former Assistant Secretary of State for Public Affairs Philip J. Crowley said: "It's hard to think of a case study that went so compellingly wrong so rapidly."

=== United Master Executive Council ===
On April 13, 2017, the United Master Executive Council, the United Airlines bargaining unit of the Air Line Pilots Association, a trade union, issued a statement to shift blame from United to Republic Airlines, one of the carriers under contract to operate United Express flights, and especially the Chicago Department of Aviation. The statement read in part: "this violent incident should never have happened and was a result of gross excessive force by Chicago Department of Aviation personnel."

=== Other airlines ===
Emirates launched an advertising campaign that parodies United Airlines' "Fly the Friendly Skies" slogan and Munoz's previous statements about airlines in the Middle East. Royal Jordanian put up a picture of a no-smoking sign on its Twitter account with the messages, "We would like to remind you that drags on flights are strictly prohibited by passengers and crew," and "We are here to keep you #united. Dragging is strictly prohibited."

Delta Air Lines increased the amount of compensation supervisors can offer to displaced passengers from $1,350 to $9,950 with gate agents able to offer $2,000, up from $800. American Airlines also enacted a new policy: passengers who have already boarded will never be removed to seat others. Southwest Airlines announced it will no longer overbook flights.

=== United States government ===
==== Executive branch ====
Sean Spicer answers questions about the White House's response to the incident.

The White House's "We the People" webpage received 100,000 petition signatures in one day—exceeding the threshold needed for official review—demanding a government investigation into the incident. White House Press Secretary Sean Spicer commented that "It was an unfortunate incident" and added "when you watch the video, it is troubling to see how that was handled".

The United States Department of Transportation (USDOT) said it was reviewing the incident. "While it is legal for airlines to [involuntarily] bump passengers from an oversold flight when there are not enough volunteers, it is the airline's responsibility to determine its own fair boarding priorities," the agency said in a statement. On April 12, the USDOT stated that it was "reviewing the involuntary denied boarding of passenger(s) from United Express flight 3411 to determine whether the airline complied with the oversales rule."

New Jersey Governor Chris Christie asked the United States Secretary of Transportation, Elaine Chao, to suspend allowing airlines to overbook passengers.

U.S. President Donald Trump criticized United Airlines' response to Dao in an interview with The Wall Street Journal. He said the airline's treatment of their customer was "horrible" and that the airline should have further increased the financial offer to customers to voluntarily leave the plane, instead of choosing to use force. Trump told The Wall Street Journal: "You know, there's a point at which I'm getting off the plane ... seriously. They should have gone up higher. But to just randomly say, 'You're getting off the plane,' that was terrible."

On January 13, 2021, the USDOT amended its rules, effective in April 2021, to require that a passenger may not be denied permission to board or be involuntarily removed from an airliner once they have checked in for the flight prior to the deadline and had their ticket or boarding pass collected or electronically scanned and accepted by the gate agent.

==== Congress ====
U.S. senators' letter to Munoz

A bipartisan group of senators on the Senate Commerce, Science and Transportation Committee described the incident as "disturbing", and wrote to Munoz and the Chicago Department of Aviation. The group sought information about the crew-scheduling mix-up that required passengers to give up their seats, and asked whether United considers bumping a passenger to accommodate employees to be the same as an "oversold" situation. They asked the Chicago Department of Aviation about their security protocols and whether Dao had been passive or threatening during the incident. Both parties were given until April 20, 2017, to respond. United Airlines submitted their response on April 26, 2017.

Separately, twenty-one Democratic U.S. Senators wrote to Munoz to express their deep concern, and asked a range of questions about the incident, requesting a response by April 24, 2017.

Congressional Delegate Eleanor Holmes Norton (D-DC) called for hearings from the House Transportation and Infrastructure (T&I) Committee. Dan Lipinski (D-IL), member of the House Transportation Committee's Aviation subcommittee, called on Congress to make legislative amendments to give passengers more rights and to prevent further similar incidents. Senator Robert Menendez (D-NJ) said the incident was disturbing and criticized Munoz's "empty apology".

Senator Chris Van Hollen (D-MD) drafted the "Customers Not Cargo Act", which would ban airlines from involuntarily bumping passengers who are already on the aircraft and seated. He previously said United must do more than "apologize", and called for a full investigation. Separately, congresswoman Jan Schakowsky (D-IL) stated she intended to introduce legislation to end involuntary bumping of passengers, requiring airlines to increase their offer until a customer voluntarily gives up their seat. On April 26, 2017, Senators Maggie Hassan (D-NH) and Brian Schatz (D-Hawaii) introduced a bill which would change how airlines handle their boarding and bumping policies. The bill became law in October 2018 and is the basis for USDOT rules that protect passengers from removal or denial of boarding after check-in.

=== Illinois General Assembly ===
Illinois state Representative Peter Breen introduced the Airline Passenger Protection Act in the Illinois House of Representatives. The act forbids state or local government authorities from removing passengers that are not dangerous or causing a disturbance in non-emergency situations. It also forbids the state of Illinois from doing business with airlines whose policies allow removal of paying passengers to make room for employees traveling on non-revenue tickets.

=== Chicago City Council ===
Chicago City Council's Aviation Committee held hearings starting April 13 to investigate the incident. Committee Chairman Mike Zalewski said the incident had damaged the reputation of Chicago and O'Hare International Airport. Zalewski wanted responses from United, Aviation Commissioner Ginger Evans, and from the union representing aviation police, Service Employees International Union (SEIU) Local 73.

An April 12 statement by the Chicago Department of Aviation offered these comments about their security staff: "While they do have limited authority to make an arrest, Sunday's incident was not within standard operating procedures nor will we tolerate that kind of action. That is why we quickly placed the aviation security officer on leave pending a thorough review of the situation. The action we have taken thus far reflects what we currently know, and as our review continues we will not hesitate to take additional action as appropriate."

=== Chicago Police Department ===
Chicago Aviation Security were instructed to remove the word "police" from their uniforms in January 2017, but they refused this instruction. As a result, there was confusion as to what organization had responded to the event, with some thinking that the Chicago Police Department responded. The Chicago Police Department Office of Communications stated that Dr. Dao fell—a statement which contradicts what is seen in both videos. When questioned about this, the Chicago Police Department's chief spokesman Anthony Guglielmi said, "CPD didn't release an official statement on it. We were not involved. Dept. of Aviation has everything you will need." When pressed further about why CPD issued a response about an incident in which they were not involved, Guglielmi said this, "A takeaway for me is to ensure the department's press office is more consistent in referring to appropriate outside agencies for incidents in which CPD is not the acting or involved agency."

=== Litigation ===
Dao's personal injury lawyer asked the Cook County Circuit Court for an order requiring United and the city of Chicago to retain all video, cockpit recordings, and other reports from the flight, including personnel files of the Aviation Department officers who pulled Dao from the plane. United and the city of Chicago agreed, forgoing a court hearing.

Through his lawyers, Dao described his ordeal as "more horrifying" than his experience of the fall of Saigon during the Vietnam War.

On April 24, Dao's attorney announced that Dao intended to file a lawsuit against United. Three days later, United and Dao reached a confidential settlement.

In April 2018, one of the Aviation Department officers, James Long, filed a lawsuit against United Airlines and the Chicago Department of Aviation alleging that he was not properly trained to handle misbehaving passengers, was unfairly fired, and slandered. The lawsuit was dropped in April 2019.

After the Chicago Department of Aviation Police was downgraded to be a security agency, a federal class action lawsuit was filed in 2018 over a perceived loss of employment benefits enjoyed by law enforcement officers by some of the now reclassified security guards. The lawsuit was eventually denied in September 2021, and underwent an appeal in the Seventh Circuit appellate courts in September 2022. The Seventh Circuit affirmed the lower court decision in January 2023.

==== Third-party legal commentary ====
Early reports and United Airlines initially characterized the incident as a consequence of overbooking, leading some experts to question whether that was the case. John Banzhaf, a professor of law at the George Washington University Law School, states that United was "citing the wrong federal rule to justify its illegal request to force a passenger already boarded and seated to disembark", since the regulation cited only covers denial of boarding, and not removing a passenger after boarding.

While United has asserted a right to remove passengers after boarding, none of the reasons for doing so specified in the airline's contract of carriage applied in this situation. One attorney pointedly stated United "had absolutely no right to remove that man from the airplane" and described the incident as "assault and battery."

Chicago City Council alderman Michael Zalewski questioned whether the Chicago Airport Police even had the legal authority to enter the aircraft.

A partner at Kreindler & Kreindler, a law firm specializing in air disaster litigation, concluded, "United, if they're smart, will quickly and quietly settle the case."

== In popular culture ==
The incident was discussed on numerous comedy shows, including Conan, The Ellen DeGeneres Show, Jimmy Kimmel Live!, and Saturday Night Live. Comedian Jimmy Kimmel criticized United Airlines and its handling of the incident in a five-minute segment of Jimmy Kimmel Live!. Kimmel, referring to the word "re-accommodate" used by Munoz, said, "That is such sanitized, say-nothing, take-no-responsibility, corporate B.S. speak." In an SNL sketch, Jimmy Fallon's character Doug proposes marriage to Cecily Strong's Jen after admitting that he made "one of the biggest mistakes a person can make". Jen replies, "No, Doug! You dragged a man off a plane this week!"

The cover of The New Yorker May 22 issue depicted former FBI director James Comey, who had just been fired, being dragged down the aisle of an airplane by former U.S. Attorney General Jeff Sessions.

American actor Will Ferrell mentioned the incident in his May 2017 commencement address to the University of Southern California's graduating class. Referring to his honorary Doctor of Humane Letters degree awarded on the same day, he quipped, "The next time I'm flying and they ask if there's a doctor on board, I can now confidently leap to my feet and scream, 'I'm a doctor, what can I do? Yes, no problem, I can absolutely deliver that baby.' Hopefully it will be on United Airlines, in which case I will be immediately subdued and dragged off the aircraft, which we all know will be recorded on someone's iPhone and put on YouTube."

== 2019 interview with Dao ==
On April 9, 2019, two years after the incident, David Dao was interviewed by ABC News, speaking out for the first time since the incident. Dao claimed that when he watched the video, he "just cried".

== See also ==
- List of air rage incidents
- "United Breaks Guitars", song about Dave Carroll's struggle with the airline to get compensation for a guitar allegedly damaged during transit on a United flight
