= Bing Futch =

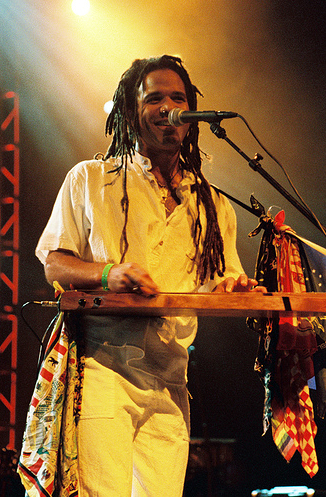
- Futch in 2006

Background information
- Born: Edward Michael Futch; December 16, 1966 (age 59)
- Origin: Born Hollywood, California; Raised Los Angeles, California US
- Genres: Americana, blues, rock and roll, pop
- Occupations: musician, producer
- Years active: 1986—present
- Label: J.O.B. Entertainment Inc. (1986–present)
- Website: bingfutch.com

Bing Futch (b. Hollywood, California, December 16, 1966) is a musician whose primary instrument is the mountain dulcimer. He is the grandson of the late boxing hall-of-famer Eddie Futch. Relocating to Orlando, Florida in 1993, Futch formed Americana band Mohave in 1999 with Mike Burney playing acoustic bass, and Rob Buck on drums. Over a span of 16 years, the band performed numerous shows throughout Florida, including multiple nights in the House of Blues at Walt Disney World, and Hard Rock Live at Universal Orlando, opening for The Crests, and Molly Hatchet along the way.

Futch began performing as a solo act in 2006, stating that his instrument of choice helped get his foot in the door of many venues. "While cutting my teeth as a performer in bars, clubs, and resorts, the mountain dulcimer often bought me a second look when people walked into the place." He soon began appearing at festivals nationwide, bringing an expansive repertoire of styles together with modern touches, like bass pedals and loopers. This caught the attention of Folkcraft Instruments owner, Richard Ash, who invited Futch to become the company's first endorsing artist in 2008.

One of only two mountain dulcimer players to compete in the history of the International Blues Challenge, Futch advanced to the semi-finals in the 2015 competition. During the 2016 International Blues Challenge, Futch advanced to the finals and was awarded "Best Guitarist" in the solo-duo category, despite performing solely on the Appalachian mountain dulcimer.

Futch has composed and produced soundtracks for film, theater, television, and themed attractions, including The Castle of Miracles at Give Kids The World Village in Kissimmee, Florida.

== Northwest Airlines incident ==
On June 14, 2009, Futch was en route to a show in Ft. Wayne, Indiana, on Northwest Airlines flight 2363 from Detroit, Michigan. During that time, baggage handlers damaged his double-necked mountain dulcimer. Encouraged by fans to write a song about the incident, and after seeing Dave Carroll's "United Breaks Guitars" on YouTube, Futch penned "Only a Northwest Song" on July 10, 2009, and posted it to the service, hoping it would help to avoid a "lengthy reimbursement battle." Within a day of the video's posting, Northwest Airlines contacted Futch to offer their apologies along with compensation.

== Question on Jeopardy! ==
On February 16, 2010, during the finale of a three-day Jeopardy! pitting returning champs Ken Jennings and Brad Rutter against IBM's Supercomputer Watson, Futch's name appeared as one of three possible questions for the answer "Nearly 10 million YouTubers saw Dave Carroll's clip called "this friendly skies" airline "breaks guitars." Watson offered up "United Airlines" with an 81% probability of being correct, "United Breaks Guitars" was the second choice with a probability of 13% and "Futch" was the third choice with a probability of 7%.

== Discography ==
- Castaway: Original Soundtrack, 1986
- Kansas, 1987
- Buy Dis Album Ore God Will Disconnect My Fone, 1987
- The Girl and the Book, 1987
- 21, 1987
- Fantasy Amidst The Storm, 1989
- 70 mm, 1994
- Dulcimerica: Volume 1, 2006
- Dulcimer Rock, 2007
- Kokopelli Rising, 2008
- Christmas Each Day, 2008
- Dulcimerica: Volume 2, 2010
- Storm's Sigh, 2011
- Live At Old Songs!, 2012
- Dive!, 2013
- All Songs Lead To The Gift Shop, 2014
- Unresolved Blues, 2015
- Dulcimerica: Volume 3, 2015
- Sweet River, 2015
- Return Of Live At Old Songs, 2016
- Live From Ditty TV, 2016
- Synth For A Season, 2016
- What's Old Becomes New Again, 2017
- The Improv Files: Year One, 2018
- The Beauty and the Terror, 2021
- Remain Seated Please, 2023
- Acting My Age, 2026

With Nutty Faith:

- It's Our Job, 1985

With Crazed Bunnyz:

- Achtung: Musik Klirrfaktor, 1986
- Live!, 1987
- Transition, 1987
- Blutgasse, 1988

With Mohave:

- Homegrown, 1999
- Spider Rock, 2000
- Live At Leu Gardens, 2003
- Clear Blue Trickling, 2005

With Naked Head:

- Beautiful Disruption, 2002

With Manitou:

- In The Garden Of The Gods, 2009

As Producer:

- Wendy Songe Test Drive, 2015
- Wendy Songe Driven, 2016
