= List of law enforcement agencies in Illinois =

This is a list of law enforcement agencies in the state of Illinois.

According to the US Bureau of Justice Statistics' 2018 Census of State and Local Law Enforcement Agencies, the state had 846 law enforcement agencies employing 48,240 sworn police officers, about 379 for each 100,000 residents.

== State agencies ==
- Illinois Attorney General's Office
  - Department of Investigations
  - Illinois Attorney General Police
- Illinois Commerce Commission Police
- Illinois Department of Corrections
- Illinois Department of Human Services Police Department
- Illinois Department of Natural Resources
  - Illinois Conservation Police
- Illinois Department of Revenue Police
  - Bureau of Criminal Investigations
- Illinois Gaming Board
- Illinois Law Enforcement Training and Standards Board
- Illinois Secretary of State
  - Illinois Secretary of State Capitol Police
  - Illinois Secretary of State Police
- Illinois State Fire Marshal Arson Investigation
- Illinois State Police

== County agencies ==
=== Sheriff's Offices ===
- Adams County Sheriff's Office
- Alexander County Sheriff's Office
- Bond County Sheriff's Office
- Boone County Sheriff's Office
- Brown County Sheriff's Office
- Bureau County Sheriff's Office
- Calhoun County Sheriff's Office
- Carroll County Sheriff's Office
- Cass County Sheriff's Office
- Champaign County Sheriff's Office
- Christian County Sheriff's Office
- Clark County Sheriff's Office
- Clay County Sheriff's Office
- Clinton County Sheriff's Office
- Coles County Sheriff's Office
- Cook County Sheriff's Office
- Crawford County Sheriff's Office
- Cumberland County Sheriff's Office
- DeKalb County Sheriff's Office
- Dewitt County Sheriff's Office
- Douglas County Sheriff's Office
- DuPage County Sheriff's Office
- Edgar County Sheriff's Office
- Edwards County Sheriff's Office
- Effingham County Sheriff's Office
- Fayette County Sheriff's Office
- Ford County Sheriff's Office
- Franklin County Sheriff's Office
- Fulton County Sheriff's Office
- Gallatin County Sheriff's Office
- Greene County Sheriff's Office
- Grundy County Sheriff's Office
- Hamilton County Sheriff's Office
- Hancock County Sheriff's Office
- Hardin County Sheriff's Office
- Henderson County Sheriff's Office
- Henry County Sheriff's Office
- Iroquois County Sheriff's Office
- Jackson County Sheriff's Office
- Jasper County Sheriff's Office
- Jefferson County Sheriff's Office
- Jersey County Sheriff's Office
- Jo Daviess County Sheriff's Office
- Johnson County Sheriff's Office
- Kane County Sheriff's Office
- Kankakee County Sheriff's Office
- Kendall County Sheriff's Office
- Knox County Sheriff's Office
- LaSalle County Sheriff's Office
- Lake County Sheriff's Office
- Lawrence County Sheriff's Office
- Lee County Sheriff's Office
- Livingston County Sheriff's Office
- Logan County Sheriff's Office
- Macon County Sheriff's Office
- Macoupin County Sheriff's Office
- Madison County Sheriff's Office
- Marion County Sheriff's Office
- Marshall County Sheriff's Office
- Mason County Sheriff's Office
- Massac County Sheriff's Office
- Mc Donough County Sheriff's Office
- Mc Henry County Sheriff's Department
- Mc Lean County Sheriff's Office
- Menard County Sheriff's Office
- Mercer County Sheriff's Office
- Monroe County Sheriff's Office
- Montgomery County Sheriff's Office
- Morgan County Sheriff's Office
- Moultrie County Sheriff's Office
- Ogle County Sheriff's Office
- Peoria County Sheriff's Office
- Perry County Sheriff's Office
- Piatt County Sheriff's Office
- Pike County Sheriff's Office
- Pope County Sheriff's Office
- Pulaski County Sheriff's Office
- Putnam County Sheriff's Office
- Randolph County Sheriff's Office
- Richland County Sheriff's Office
- Rock Island County Sheriff's Office
- Saint Clair County Sheriff's Office
- Saline County Sheriff's Office
- Sangamon County Sheriff's Office
- Schuyler County Sheriff's Office
- Scott County Sheriff's Office
- Shelby County Sheriff's Office
- Stark County Sheriff's Office
- Stephenson County Sheriff's Office
- Tazewell County Sheriff's Office
- Union County Sheriff's Office
- Vermilion County Sheriff's Office
- Wabash County Sheriff's Office
- Warren County Sheriff's Office
- Washington County Sheriff's Office
- Wayne County Sheriff's Office
- White County Sheriff's Office
- Whiteside County Sheriff's Office
- Will County Sheriff's Office
- Williamson County Sheriff's Office
- Winnebago County Sheriff's Office
- Woodford County Sheriff's Office

=== County Forest Preserve police departments ===
- Forest Preserve District of Cook County, Department of Law Enforcement
- Forest Preserve District of DuPage County, Law Enforcement Department
- Forest Preserve District of Kane County, Public Safety Department
- Lake County Forest Preserve District, Public Safety Department, aka Ranger Police Department
- McHenry County Conservation District Police, Law enforcement for forest preserves in McHenry County
- Forest Preserve District of Will County, Police Department

=== Other county departments ===
- Cook County State's Attorneys Office, Investigations Unit
- Cook County Health and Hospitals System Police Department
- McHenry County Conservation Police Department
- Vermilion County Conservation Police Department

== Municipal agencies ==
- Abingdon Police Department
- Addison Police Department
- Albany Police Department
- Albers Police Department
- Albion Police Department
- Aledo Police Department
- Alexis Police Department
- Algonquin Police Department
- Alma Police Department
- Alorton Police Department
- Alpha Police Department
- Alsip Police Department
- Altamont Police Department
- Alton Police Department
- Altona Police Department
- Alvin Police Department
- Amboy Police Department
- Andalusia Police Department
- Anna Police Department
- Annawan Police Department
- Antioch Police Department
- Apple River Police Department
- Arcola Police Department
- Argenta Police Department
- Arlington Heights Police Department
- Armington Police Department
- Aroma Park Police Department
- Arthur Police Department
- Ashkum Police Department
- Ashland Police Department
- Ashley Police Department
- Ashton Police Department
- Assumption Police Department
- Astoria Police Department
- Athens Police Department
- Atkinson Police Department
- Atlanta Police Department
- Atwood Police Department
- Auburn Police Department
- Augusta Police Department
- Aurora Police Department
- Ava Police Department
- Aviston Police Department
- Avon Police Department
- Baldwin Police Department
- Bannockburn Police Department
- Barrington Police Department
- Barrington Hills Police Department
- Barrington-Inverness Police Department
- Barry Police Department
- Bartlett Police Department
- Bartonville Police Department
- Batavia Police Department
- Bath Police Department
- Baylis Police Department
- Bayview Gardens Police Department
- Beardstown Police Department
- Beckemeyer Police Department
- Bedford Park Police Department
- Beecher Police Department
- Belgium Police Department
- Belleville Police Department
- Bellflower Police Department
- Bellwood Police Department
- Belvidere Police Department
- Bement Police Department
- Benld Police Department
- Bensenville Police Department
- Benton Police Department
- Berkeley Police Department
- Berwyn Police Department
- Bethalto Police Department
- Bethany Police Department
- Blandinsville Police Department
- Bloomingdale Police Department
- Bloomington Police Department
- Blue Island Police Department
- Blue Mound Police Department
- Bluffs Police Department
- Bolingbrook Police Department
- Bonnie Police Department
- Bourbonnais Police Department
- Bradford Police Department
- Bradley Police Department
- Braidwood Police Department
- Breese Police Department
- Bridgeport Police Department
- Bridgeview Police Department
- Brighton Police Department
- Broadview Police Department
- Brocton Police Department
- Brookfield Police Department
- Brooklyn Police Department
- Brookport Police Department
- Brownstown Police Department
- Buckner Police Department
- Buda Police Department
- Buffalo Grove Police Department
- Buffalo-Mechanicsburg Police Department
- Bull Valley Police Department
- Buncombe Police Department
- Bunker Hill Police Department
- Burbank Police Department
- Bureau Police Department
- Burnham Police Department
- Burr Ridge Police Department
- Bushnell Police Department
- Byron Police Department
- Cahokia Police Department
- Cairo Police Department
- Calumet City Police Department
- Calumet Park Police Department
- Cambria Police Department
- Camp Point Police Department
- Campton Hills Police Department
- Canton Police Department
- Carbondale Police Department
- Carlinville Police Department
- Carlyle Police Department
- Carmi Police Department
- Carol Stream Police Department
- Carpentersville Police Department
- Carrier Mills Police Department
- Carrollton Police Department
- Carterville Police Department
- Carthage Police Department
- Cary Police Department
- Casey Police Department
- Caseyville Police Department
- Catlin Police Department
- Cave-In-Park Police Department
- Cedar Point Police Department
- Cedarville Police Department
- Central City Police Department
- Centralia Police Department
- Centreville Police Department
- Cerro Gordo Police Department
- Chadwick Police Department
- Champaign Police Department
- Chandlerville Police Department
- Channahon Police Department
- Chapin Police Department
- Charleston Police Department
- Chatham Police Department
- Chebanse Police Department
- Chenoa Police Department
- Cherry Police Department
- Cherry Valley Police Department
- Chester Police Department
- Chesterfield Police Department
- Chicago Heights Police Department
- Chicago Police Department
- Chicago Ridge Police Department
- Chillicothe Police Department
- Chrisman Police Department
- Christopher Police Department
- Cicero Police Department
- Cissna Park Police Department
- Clarendon Hills Police Department
- Clayton Police Department
- Clinton Police Department
- Coal City Police Department
- Coal Valley Police Department
- Cobden Police Department
- Coffeen Police Department
- Colchester Police Department
- Colfax Police Department
- Collinsville Police Department
- Colona Police Department
- Columbia Police Department
- Cordova Police Department
- Cortland Police Department
- Coulterville Police Department
- Country Club Hills Police Department
- Countryside Police Department
- Cowden Police Department
- Crainsville Police Department
- Creal Springs Police Department
- Crest Hill Police Department
- Crestwood Police Department
- Crete Police Department
- Creve Coeur Police Department
- Crossville Police Department
- Crystal Lake Police Department
- Cuba Police Department
- Cutler Police Department
- Cypress Police Department
- Dallas City Police Department
- Dalzell Police Department
- Dana Police Department
- Danvers Police Department
- Danville Police Department
- Darien Police Department
- De Pue Police Department
- Decatur Police Department
- Deer Creek-Goodfield Police Department
- Deerfield Police Department
- Dekalb Police Department
- Delavan Police Department
- DePue Police Department
- Des Plaines Police Department
- DeSoto Police Department
- Divernon Police Department
- Dixmoor Police Department
- Dixon Police Department
- Dolton Police Department
- Dongola Police Department
- Donnellson Police Department
- Dowell Police Department
- Downers Grove Police Department
- Downs Police Department
- Du Quoin Police Department
- Dunfermline Police Department
- Dupo Police Department
- Durand Police Department
- Dwight Police Department
- Earlville Police Department
- East Alton Police Department
- East Carondelet Police Department
- East Dubuque Police Department
- East Dundee Police Department
- East Galesburg Police Department
- East Hazel Crest Police Department
- East Moline Police Department
- East Peoria Police Department
- East St Louis Police Department
- Easton Police Department
- Edinburg Police Department
- Edwardsville Police Department
- Effingham Police Department
- El Paso Police Department
- Elburn Police Department
- Eldorado Police Department
- Elgin Police Department
- Elizabeth Police Department
- Elk Grove Village Police Department
- Elkhart Police Department
- Elkville Police Department
- Ellis Grove Police Department
- Elmhurst Police Department
- Elmwood Police Department
- Elmwood Park Police Department
- Elsah Police Department
- Elwood Police Department
- Emden Police Department
- Energy Police Department
- Enfield Police Department
- Erie Police Department
- Eureka Police Department
- Evanston Police Department
- Evansville Police Department
- Evergreen Park Police Department
- Ewing Police Department
- Fairbury Police Department
- Fairfield Police Department
- Fairmont City Police Department
- Fairmount Police Department
- Fairview Heights Police Department
- Fairview Police Department
- Farina Police Department
- Farmer City Police Department
- Farmington Police Department
- Fayetteville Police Department
- Fillmore Police Department
- Findlay Police Department
- Fisher Police Department
- Fithian Police Department
- Flora Police Department
- Flossmoor Police Department
- Forest City Police Department
- Forest Park Police Department
- Forest View Police Department
- Fox Lake Police Department
- Fox River Grove Police Department
- Frankfort Police Department
- Franklin Grove Police Department
- Franklin Park Police Department
- Freeburg Police Department
- Freeport Police Department
- Fulton Police Department
- Galatia Police Department
- Galena Police Department
- Galesburg Police Department
- Galva Police Department
- Gardner Police Department
- Geneseo Police Department
- Geneva Police Department
- Genoa Police Department
- Georgetown Police Department
- German Valley Police Department
- Gibson City Police Department
- Gillespie Police Department
- Gilman Police Department
- Girard Police Department
- Gladstone Police Department
- Glasford Police Department
- Glen Carbon Police Department
- Glen Ellyn Police Department
- Glencoe Department of Public Safety
- Glendale Heights Police Department
- Glenview Police Department
- Glenwood Police Department
- Golconda Police Department
- Golf Police Department
- Goreville Police Department
- Grafton Police Department
- Grandview Police Department
- Granite City Police Department
- Granville Police Department
- Grant Park Police Department
- Grayslake Police Department
- Grayville Police Department
- Great Lakes Police Department
- Green Valley Police Department
- Greenfield Police Department
- Greenup Police Department
- Greenview Police Department
- Greenville Police Department
- Gridley Police Department
- Griggsville Police Department
- Gulfport Police Department
- Gurnee Police Department
- Hamel Police Department
- Hamilton Police Department
- Hampshire Police Department
- Hampton Police Department
- Hanover Park Police Department
- Hanover Police Department
- Hardin Police Department
- Harrisburg Police Department
- Hartford Police Department
- Harvard Police Department
- Harvel Police Department
- Harvey Police Department
- Harwood Heights Police Department
- Havana Police Department
- Hawthorn Woods Police Department
- Hazel Crest Police Department
- Hebron Police Department
- Hennepin Police Department
- Henry Police Department
- Herrin Police Department
- Herscher Police Department
- Heyworth Police Department
- Hickory Hills Police Department
- Highland Park Police Department
- Highland Police Department
- Highwood Police Department
- Hillcrest Police Department
- Hillsboro Police Department
- Hillside Police Department
- Hinckley Police Department
- Hinsdale Police Department
- Hodgkins Police Department
- Hoffman Estates Police Department
- Hometown Police Department
- Homewood Police Department
- Hoopeston Police Department
- Hopedale Police Department
- Hudson Police Department
- Huntley Police Department
- Hurst Police Department
- Illiopolis Police Department
- India Head Park Police Department
- Inverness Police Department
- Irvington Police Department
- Island Lake Police Department
- Itasca Police Department
- Jacksonville Police Department
- Jerome Police Department
- Jerseyville Police Department
- Johnsburg Police Department
- Johnston City Police Department
- Joliet Police Department
- Jonesboro Police Department
- Justice Police Department
- Kankakee Police Department
- Kansas Police Department
- Karnak Police Department
- Keithsburg Police Department
- Kenilworth Police Department
- Kewanee Police Department
- Kildeer Police Department
- Kincaid Police Department
- Kingston Police Department
- Kinmundy Police Department
- Kirkland Police Department
- Knoxville Police Department
- La Grange Park Police Department
- La Grange Police Department
- La Harpe Police Department
- La Salle Police Department
- Lacon Police Department
- Ladd Police Department
- Lake Bluff Police Department
- Lake Forest Police Department
- Lake in the Hills Police Department
- Lake Zurich Police Department
- Lakemoor Police Department
- LaMoille Police Department
- Lanark Police Department
- Lansing Police Department
- Lawrenceville Police Department
- Lebanon Police Department
- Leland Police Department
- Lemont Police Department
- Lena Police Department
- Lenzburg Police Department
- LeRoy Police Department
- Lewistown Police Department
- Lexington Police Department
- Libertyville Police Department
- Lincoln Police Department
- Lincolnshire Police Department
- Lincolnwood Police Department
- Lindenhurst Police Department
- Lisle Police Department
- Litchfield Police Department
- Livingston Police Department
- Lockport Police Department
- Lomax Police Department
- Lombard Police Department
- Loves Park Police Department
- Lovington Police Department
- Ludlow Police Department
- Lyndon Police Department
- Lynwood Police Department
- Lyons Police Department
- Mackinaw Police Department
- Macomb Police Department
- Madison Police Department
- Mahomet Police Department
- Malta Police Department
- Manhattan Police Department
- Manito Police Department
- Mansfield Police Department
- Manteno Police Department
- Marengo Police Department
- Marion Police Department
- Marissa Police Department
- Markham Police Department
- Maroa Police Department
- Marseilles Police Department
- Marshall Police Department
- Martinsville Police Department
- Maryville Police Department
- Mascoutah Police Department
- Mason City Police Department
- Matteson Police Department
- Mattoon Police Department
- Maywood Police Department
- McCook Police Department
- McCullom Lake Police Department
- McHenry Police Department
- McLeansboro Police Department
- Melrose Park Police Department
- Mendota Police Department
- Meredosia Police Department
- Merrionette Park Police Department
- Metamora Police Department
- Metropolis Police Department
- Midlothian Police Department
- Milan Police Department
- Milford Police Department
- Milledgeville Police Department
- Millstadt Police Department
- Minier-Armington Police Department
- Minonk Police Department
- Minooka Police Department
- Mokena Police Department
- Moline Police Department
- Momence Police Department
- Monee Police Department
- Montgomery Police Department
- Monticello Police Department
- Morris Police Department
- Morrison Police Department
- Morrisonville Police Department
- Morton Grove Police Department
- Morton Police Department
- Mound City Police Department
- Mounds Police Department
- Mount Carmel Police Department
- Mount Carroll Police Department
- Mount Morris Police Department
- Mount Olive Police Department
- Mount Prospect Police Department
- Mount Pulaski Police Department
- Mount Sterling Police Department
- Mount Vernon Police Department
- Mount Zion Police Department
- Moweaqua Police Department
- Mundelein Police Department
- Murphysboro Police Department
- Naperville Police Department
- Nashville Police Department
- Nauvoo Police Department
- Neoga Police Department
- Neponset Police Department
- New Athens Police Department
- New Baden Police Department
- New Berlin Police Department
- New Lenox Police Department
- Newman Police Department
- Newton Police Department
- Niles Police Department
- Nokomis Police Department
- Normal Police Department
- Norridge Police Department
- Norris City Police Department
- North Aurora Police Department
- North Chicago Police Department
- North Pekin Police Department
- North Riverside Police Department
- Northbrook Police Department
- Northfield Police Department
- Northlake Police Department
- Oak Brook Police Department
- Oak Forest Police Department
- Oak Lawn Police Department
- Oak Park Police Department
- Oakbrook Terrace Police Department
- Oakland Police Department
- Oakwood Hills Police Department
- Oakwood Police Department
- Oblong Police Department
- Odin Police Department
- O'Fallon Police Department
- Oglesby Police Department
- Okawville Police Department
- Olney Police Department
- Olympia Fields Police Department
- Onarga Police Department
- Oquawka Police Department
- Oregon Police Department
- Orland Hills Police Department
- Orland Park Police Department
- Oswego Police Department
- Ottawa Police Department
- Palatine Police Department
- Palestine Police Department
- Palos Heights Police Department
- Palos Hills Police Department
- Palos Park Police Department
- Pana Police Department
- Paris Police Department
- Park City Police Department
- Park Forest Police Department
- Park Ridge Police Department
- Patoka Police Department
- Pawnee Police Department
- Paxton Police Department
- Payson Police Department
- Pearl City Police Department
- Pecatonica Police Department
- Pekin Police Department
- Peoria Heights Police Department
- Peoria Police Department
- Peotone Police Department
- Peru Police Department
- Petersburg Police Department
- Phoenix Police Department
- Pinckneyville Police Department
- Pingree Grove Police Department
- Piper City Police Department
- Pittsfield Police Department
- Plainfield Police Department
- Plano Police Department
- Pleasant Hill Police Department
- Pleasant Plains Police Department
- Polo Police Department
- Pontiac Police Department
- Pontoon Beach Police Department
- Port Byron Police Department
- Posen Police Department
- Prairie Grove Police Department
- Princeton Police Department
- Prophetstown Police Department
- Prospect Heights Police Department
- Quincy Police Department
- Rantoul Police Department
- Raymond Police Department
- Red Bud Police Department
- Richmond Police Department
- Richton Park Police Department
- Ridge Farm Police Department
- Ridgway Police Department
- River Forest Police Department
- River Grove Police Department
- Riverdale Police Department
- Riverside Police Department
- Riverton Police Department
- Riverwoods Police Department
- Robbins Police Department
- Robinson Police Department
- Rochelle Police Department
- Rochester Police Department
- Rock Falls Police Department
- Rock Island Police Department
- Rockford Police Department
- Rockton Police Department
- Rolling Meadows Police Department
- Romeoville Police Department
- Roodhouse Police Department
- Roscoe Police Department
- Roselle Police Department
- Rosemont Police Department
- Rosiclare Police Department
- Rossville Police Department
- Round Lake Beach Police Department
- Round Lake Heights Police Department
- Round Lake Park-Hainesville Police Department
- Round Lake Police Department
- Roxana Police Department
- Royal Lakes Police Department
- Royalton Police Department
- Rushville Police Department
- Salem Police Department
- San Jose Police Department
- Sandoval Police Department
- Sandwich Police Department
- Sauget Police Department
- Sauk Village Police Department
- Savanna Police Department
- Schaumburg Police Department
- Schiller Park Police Department
- Seneca Police Department
- Sesser Police Department
- Shannon Police Department
- Shawneetown Police Department
- Sheffield Police Department
- Shelbyville Police Department
- Sherman Police Department
- Sherrard Police Department
- Shiloh Police Department
- Shipman Police Department
- Shorewood Police Department
- Silvis Police Department
- Skokie Police Department
- Sleepy Hollow Police Department
- Smithton Police Department
- Somonauk Police Department
- South Beloit Police Department
- South Elgin Police Department
- South Holland Police Department
- South Jacksonville Police Department
- South Roxana Police Department
- Sparta Police Department
- Spring Valley Police Department
- Springfield Police Department
- St. Charles Police Department
- St. Elmo Police Department
- St. Peter Police Department
- Staunton Police Department
- Steeleville Police Department
- Steger Police Department
- Sterling Police Department
- Stickney Police Department
- Stockton Police Department
- Stone Park Police Department
- Streamwood Police Department
- Streator Police Department
- Sugar Grove Police Department
- Sullivan Police Department
- Summerfield Police Department
- Summit Police Department
- Sumner Police Department
- Swansea Police Department
- Sycamore Police Department
- Tampico Police Department
- Taylorville Police Department
- Teutopolis Police Department
- Thomasboro Police Department
- Thomson Police Department
- Thornton Police Department
- Tilton Police Department
- Tinley Park Police Department
- Tiskilwa Police Department
- Toledo Police Department
- Tolono Police Department
- Toluca Police Department
- Toulon Police Department
- Tower Lakes Police Department
- Tremont Police Department
- Trenton Police Department
- Troy Police Department
- Tuscola Police Department
- Ullin Police Department
- University Park Police Department
- Urbana Police Department
- Utica Police Department
- Valmeyer Police Department
- Vandalia Police Department
- Venice Police Department
- Vernon Hills Police Department
- Vienna Police Department
- Villa Grove Police Department
- Villa Park Police Department
- Viola Police Department
- Virden Police Department
- Virginia Police Department
- Walnut Police Department
- Wamac Police Department
- Warren Police Department
- Warrensburg Police Department
- Warrenville Police Department
- Washburn Police Department
- Washington Park Police Department
- Washington Police Department
- Waterloo Police Department
- Waterman Police Department
- Watseka Police Department
- Wauconda Police Department
- Waukegan Police Department
- Waverly Police Department
- Wayne Police Department
- Wenona Police Department
- West Chicago Police Department
- West Dundee Police Department
- West Frankfort Police Department
- West Salem Police Department
- Westchester Police Department
- Western Springs Police Department
- Westmont Police Department
- Westville Police Department
- Wheaton Police Department
- Wheeling Police Department
- White Hall Police Department
- Williamson Police Department
- Willow Springs Police Department
- Willowbrook Police Department
- Wilmette Police Department
- Wilmington Police Department
- Wilsonville Police Department
- Windsor Police Department
- Winfield Police Department
- Winnebago Police Department
- Winnetka Police Department
- Winthrop Harbor Police Department
- Witt Police Department
- Wood Dale Police Department
- Wood River Police Department
- Woodhull Police Department
- Woodridge Police Department
- Woodstock Police Department
- Worden Police Department
- Worth Police Department
- Wyanet Police Department
- Wyoming Police Department
- Xenia Police Department
- Yorkville Police Department
- Zeigler Police Department
- Zion Police Department

== Special district agencies ==
=== Park district police agencies ===
- Canton Park District Police Department
- Crystal Lake Park District Police Department
- Decatur Park District Police Department
- East St Louis Park District Police Department
- Fondulac Park District Police Department
- Fox Valley Park District Police Department
- Hawthorne Park District Police Department
- Lockport Township Park District Police Department
- Morton Grove Park District Police Department
- Naperville Park District Police Department
- Pekin Park District Police Department
- Peoria Park District Police Department
- Rockford Park District Police Department
- Springfield Park District Police Department
- Zion Park District Police Department

=== Other special district agencies ===
- Abraham Lincoln Capital Airport Police Department
- Chicago Zoological Society Police Department
- Effingham Water Authority Police Department
- Metra Police Department
- Metropolitan Airport Authority of Rock Island County Public Safety
- Metropolitan Water Reclamation District of Greater Chicago Police Department (formerly Chicago Sanitary District Police Department)
- Northern Indiana Commuter Transportation District Police

== College and university agencies ==
- Aurora University Campus Public Safety Department
- Augustana College Police Department
- Bradley University Police Department
- Chicago State University Police Department
- Eastern Illinois University Police Department
- Eureka College Police Department
- Governors State University Police Department
- Illinois State University Police Department
- Lewis University Police Department
- Loyola University Chicago Department of Campus Safety
- McKendree University Public Safety
- Millikin University Campus Police Department
- Moody Bible Institute Department of Public Safety
- North Central College Department of Public Safety
- Northeastern Illinois University Police Department
- Northern Illinois University Police Department
- Northwestern University Police Department
- Rockford University Department of Police and Public Safety
- Saint Xavier University Department of Public Safety
- Southern Illinois University Carbondale Police Department
- Southern Illinois University Edwardsville Police Department
- Southern Illinois University School of Medicine Office of Police and Security
- University of Chicago Police Department
- University of Illinois at Chicago Police Department
- University of Illinois at Springfield Police Department
- University of Illinois at Urbana-Champaign Police Department
- Western Illinois University - Office of Public Safety

=== Community or junior college agencies ===
- Black Hawk College Police Department
- City College of Chicago Campus Police Department
- College of DuPage Police Department
- College of Lake County Police Department
- Elgin Community College Police Department
- Harper College Police Department
- Illinois Central College Campus Police Department
- John A. Logan College Police Department
- John Wood Community College Police Department
- Joliet Junior College Police Department
- Kankakee Community College Police Department
- Kaskaskia College Police Department
- Lake Land College Police Department
- Lincoln Land Community College Police Department
- McHenry County College Police Department
- Moraine Valley Community College Police Department
- Morton College Police Department
- Oakton Community College Police Department
- Parkland College Police Department
- Rend Lake College Police Department
- Rock Valley College Police Department
- South Suburban College Police Department
- Southwestern Illinois College Police Department
- Triton College Police Department
- Waubonsee Community College Police Department

== Railroad police departments ==
- Ag Valley Railroad Police Department
- Alton & Southern Railway Police Department
- Amtrak Police Department
- Belt Railway Police Department
- Burlington Northern and Santa Fe Railroad Police Department
- Canadian National Railway Police
- Canadian Pacific Railway Police Service
- CSX Transportation Police Department
- Norfolk Southern Railway Police Department
- Terminal Railroad Police Department
- Union Pacific Railroad Police Department

== Disbanded/Defunct agencies ==
- Benedictine University Police Department Lisle Campus (Switched to public safety department)
- Benedictine University Police Department Springfield Campus (Campus closed)
- Central Area Park District Police Department, Maywood Illinois
- Chicago Department of Aviation Police Department
- Chicago Housing Authority Police Department
- Chicago Park District Police Department
- Chicago Transit Authority Police Department
- Clyde Park District Police Department
- Dixmoor Park District Police Department
- Ford Heights Police Department
- Forest Park Park District Police Department
- Heather Ridge Police Department (switched to a public safety department)
- Illinois Department of Central Management Services Police
- Illinois Department of Mental Health Police
- Lombard Park District Police Department
- London Mills Police Department
- Maywood Park District Police Department
- Memorial Park District Police Department
- Cook County's Oak Forest Hospital Department of Public Safety
- Peoria Public Schools Campus Police Department
- Round Lake Area Park District Police Department
- Markham Park District Police Department
- East Chicago Heights Police Department was renamed Ford Heights Police Department before being disbanded as stated above.
- The Park Forest South Police Department changed their name to University Park Police Department.
- Thornton Community College Police Department is currently named South Suburban Community College Police Department.
- Westfield Police Department

== See also ==
- Crime in Illinois
- Law enforcement in the United States
