= Illinois Division of Criminal Investigation =

American revenue law enforcement agency

The Illinois Division of Criminal Investigation (DCI) was first created as part of the Illinois State Police in 1977, until it was merged into the Division of Operations (DOO) in the mid-1990s. The DCI was reestablished in 2019, under executive order by Governor J. B. Pritzker.

Special agents handle a wide range of investigations, including those involving tax fraud, tax evasion, and other acts that circumvent revenue laws. Examples of these investigation for the various taxes administered by the department include:

- Income Tax: Investigating fraudulent filing or non-filing of state, corporate or personal income tax returns or employer withholding tax returns.
- Retailer's occupation and Use Tax (sales tax): Investigating fraudulent filing or non-filing, or other tax violations committed by persons engaged in retail sales.
- Motor Fuel Tax: Investigating intentional misuse of fuel of state motor fuel tax laws by persons in the trucking industry, motor fuel distributors, and others.
- Cigarette Tax: Investigating the illegal sale of unstamped cigarettes, smuggling or hijacking cigarettes, counterfeiting tax stamps, or other attempts to circumvent the state cigarette tax.
- Gaming Taxes: Investigating violations of various laws governing the licensing and conduct of games of chance within Illinois as well as investigating deliberate attempts to avoid paying taxes. (See Illinois Gaming Board/IGB)

The special agents who staff the Bureau of Criminal Investigation are sworn peace officers. They are required to have a four-year college degree plus complete a 12-week police academy and required courses. Agents also attend in-service training and are required to meet firearms qualifications.

These highly trained, law enforcement personnel work mainly with white-collar crime. As investigators, they develop and evaluate evidence. They often work closely with federal, state, county, and local law enforcement agencies and make arrests, conduct searches and seizures, and participate in raids. Their expertise in financial crime investigations is often sought by other law enforcement agencies.

== See also ==
- List of law enforcement agencies in Illinois
