= Sackville—Bedford—Preston =

Federal electoral district in Nova Scotia, Canada

Nova Scotia electoral district
- Interactive map of riding boundaries from the 2025 federal election

Federal electoral district
- Legislature: House of Commons
MP
Braedon Clark
Liberal
- District created: 1996
- First contested: 1997
- Last contested: 2025
- District webpage: profile, map

Demographics
- Population (2021): 89,524
- Electors (2025): 79,664
- Area (km²): 645.18
- Pop. density (per km²): 138.8
- Census division: Halifax
- Census subdivision: Halifax (part)

Sackville—Bedford—Preston (formerly known as Sackville—Eastern Shore, Sackville—Musquodoboit Valley—Eastern Shore and Sackville—Preston—Chezzetcook) is a federal electoral district in Halifax, Nova Scotia, Canada, that has been represented in the House of Commons of Canada since 1997.

== Demographics ==
Historical population
Year	Pop.	±%
2001	84,209	—
2006	86,963	+3.3%
2011 (2003 redist.)	91,266	+4.9%
2011 (2013 redist.)	85,853	−5.9%
2016	86,498	+0.8%
2021	89,524	+3.5%

According to the 2021 Canadian census; 2023 representation

Racial groups: 83.0% White, 4.2% Indigenous, 4.3% Black, 2.1% Arab, 1.9% Chinese, 1.8% South Asian
Languages: 90.1% English, 3.1% French, 1.6% Arabic
Religions: 58.5% Christian (25.3% Catholic, 9.0% Anglican, 7.3% United Church, 5.2% Baptist, 1.0% Pentecostal, 10.8% Other), 2.5% Muslim, 36.8% No religion
Median income (2020): $45,600
Average income (2015): $56,550

== Geography ==
The district includes the part of the Halifax Regional Municipality located on the Atlantic coast between Lake Charlotte and Jeddore Harbour in the east to Halifax Harbour in the west excluding the community of Dartmouth and the community of Eastern Passage. It also includes HRM's northern suburbs in the Sackville River valley north to the boundary with Hants County. The land area is 645.18 km^{2} (249.11 sq mi).

== History ==
The electoral district was created in 1996 from Central Nova and Dartmouth ridings, and was known as "Sackville—Musquodoboit Valley—Eastern Shore" from 1999 to 2003. MP Peter Stoffer tabled a Private Members Bill to change the name of the riding to "Sackville—Preston—Eastern Shore". As per the 2012 federal electoral redistribution, this riding was largely dissolved into the new riding of Sackville—Preston—Chezzetcook (94%), with small portions going to Central Nova (4%) and Dartmouth—Cole Harbour (2%).

Following the 2022 federal electoral redistribution, Sackville—Preston—Chezzetcook was largely replaced by the new riding of Sackville—Bedford—Preston. It gained the Bedford, Hammonds Plains and Lucasville areas from Halifax West; and the area north of Highways 111 and 118 plus the Lake Charles area from Dartmouth—Cole Harbour. It lost the Lawrencetown, Porters Lake and the Chezzetcook areas to Central Nova.

=== Members of Parliament ===
This riding has elected the following members of Parliament:

Parliament	Years	Member	Party
Sackville—Musquodoboit Valley—Eastern Shore; Riding created from Central Nova and Dartmouth
36th	1997–2000	Peter Stoffer	New Democratic
37th	2000–2004	Peter Stoffer	New Democratic
Sackville—Eastern Shore
38th	2004–2006	Peter Stoffer	New Democratic
39th	2006–2008	Peter Stoffer	New Democratic
40th	2008–2011	Peter Stoffer	New Democratic
41st	2011–2015	Peter Stoffer	New Democratic
Sackville—Preston—Chezzetcook
42nd	2015–2019	Darrell Samson	Liberal
43rd	2019–2021	Darrell Samson	Liberal
44th	2021–2025	Darrell Samson	Liberal
Sackville—Bedford—Preston
45th	2025–present	Braedon Clark	Liberal

== Election results ==
=== Sackville—Bedford—Preston ===
2025 Canadian federal election
Party	Candidate	Votes	%	±%
Liberal	Braedon Clark	36,062	61.97	+17.32
Conservative	Dave Carroll	18,860	32.41	+7.42
New Democratic	Isaac Wilson	2,324	3.99	-20.79
Green	Andre Anderson	526	0.90	-1.15
People's	Ryan Slaney	418	0.72	-2.77
Total valid votes/expense limit		58,190	99.29	
Total rejected ballots		416	0.71	+0.23
Turnout		58,606	73.16	+8.77
Eligible voters		80,104		
Liberal notional hold		Swing		+4.95
Source: Elections Canada
Note: number of eligible voters does not include voting day registrations.

2021 federal election redistributed results
Party	Vote	%
Liberal	22,199	44.65
Conservative	12,424	24.99
New Democratic	12,317	24.78
People's	1,732	3.48
Green	1,019	2.05
Christian Heritage	23	0.05
Total valid votes	49,714	99.52
Rejected ballots	242	0.48
Registered voters/ estimated turnout	77,585	64.39

=== Sackville—Preston—Chezzetcook ===
==== 2021 ====
2021 Canadian federal election: Sackville—Preston—Chezzetcook
Party	Candidate	Votes	%	±%	Expenditures
Liberal	Darrell Samson	18,838	41.3	+1.1	$68,438.97
Conservative	Angela Conrad	12,047	26.4	+3.8	$24,989.76
New Democratic	Jenna Chisholm	12,012	26.3	+2.4	$23,933.45
People's	Earl Gosse	1,776	3.9	+2.2	$5,292.19
Green	Anthony Edmonds	933	2.0	-9.6	$1,654.05
Total valid votes/expense limit		45,606	99.5	+0.1	$107,534.18
Total rejected ballots		252	0.5	-0.1	
Turnout		45,858	63.5	-6.0	
Registered voters		72,197			
Liberal hold		Swing		-1.4	
Source: Elections Canada

==== 2019 ====
2019 Canadian federal election: Sackville—Preston—Chezzetcook
Party	Candidate	Votes	%	±%	Expenditures
Liberal	Darrell Samson	19,925	40.22	−7.73	$85,306.32
New Democratic	Matt Stickland	11,860	23.94	−10.45	none listed
Conservative	Kevin Copley	11,211	22.63	+7.75	$34,737.99
Green	Anthony Edmonds	5,725	11.56	+8.78	$2,901.53
People's	Sybil Hogg	816	1.65		none listed
Total valid votes/expense limit		49,537	99.36		$104,082.91
Total rejected ballots		320	0.64	+0.27	
Turnout		49,857	69.48	−1.78	
Eligible voters		71,759			
Liberal hold		Swing		+1.36	
Source: Elections Canada

==== 2015 ====
2015 Canadian federal election: Sackville—Preston—Chezzetcook
Party	Candidate	Votes	%	±%	Expenditures
Liberal	Darrell Samson	23,161	47.95	+36.64	$70,884.65
New Democratic	Peter Stoffer	16,613	34.39	–19.90	$56,102.19
Conservative	Robert Strickland	7,186	14.88	–15.31	$16,062.61
Green	Mike Montgomery	1,341	2.78	–1.42	$1,127.68
Total valid votes/expense limit		48,301	99.63		$201,426.67
Total rejected ballots		180	0.37		
Turnout		48,481	71.25		
Eligible voters		68,040			
Liberal gain from New Democratic		Swing		+28.27	
Source: Elections Canada

2011 federal election redistributed results
Party	Vote	%
New Democratic	21,174	54.30
Conservative	11,772	30.19
Liberal	4,409	11.31
Green	1,637	4.20
Others	3	0.01

=== Sackville—Eastern Shore ===
==== 2011 ====
2011 Canadian federal election: Sackville—Preston—Chezzetcook
Party	Candidate	Votes	%	±%	Expenditures
New Democratic	Peter Stoffer	22,483	54.07	-7.36	$41,167.28
Conservative	Adam Mimnagh	12,662	30.45	+9.71	$24,555.96
Liberal	Scott Hemming	4,673	11.24	-1.46	$18,619.07
Green	John Percy	1,762	4.24	-0.91	$828.54
Total valid votes/expense limit		41,580	100.0		$83,710.01
Total rejected, unmarked and declined ballots		246	0.59	+0.23	
Turnout		41,826	59.47	+0.95	
Eligible voters		70,329			
New Democratic hold		Swing		-8.54	

==== 2008 ====
2008 Canadian federal election: Sackville—Preston—Chezzetcook
Party	Candidate	Votes	%	±%	Expenditures
New Democratic	Peter Stoffer	24,279	61.43	+8.48	$45,646.87
Conservative	David Montgomery	8,198	20.74	-1.16	$18,400.92
Liberal	Carolyn Scott	5,018	12.70	-10.29	$27,348.88
Green	Noreen Hartlen	2,034	5.15	+2.90	$399.04
Total valid votes/expense limit		39,524	100.0		$80,209
Total rejected, unmarked and declined ballots		142	0.36	+0.10	
Turnout		39,666	58.52	-3.92	
Eligible voters		67,786			
New Democratic hold		Swing		+4.82	

==== 2006 ====
2006 Canadian federal election: Sackville—Preston—Chezzetcook
Party	Candidate	Votes	%	±%	Expenditures
New Democratic	Peter Stoffer	22,848	52.95	+7.18	$55,364.52
Liberal	Bill Fleming	9,921	22.99	-5.67	$30,450.85
Conservative	Paul Francis	9,450	21.90	+0.55	$59,102.04
Green	Richard MacDonald	933	2.16	-0.41	none listed
Total valid votes/expense limit		43,152	100.0		$75,334
Total rejected, unmarked and declined ballots		125	0.29	-0.17	
Turnout		43,277	62.44	+1.89	
Eligible voters		69,311			
New Democratic hold		Swing		+6.42	

==== 2004 ====
2004 Canadian federal election: Sackville—Preston—Chezzetcook
Party	Candidate	Votes	%	±%	Expenditures
New Democratic	Peter Stoffer	17,925	45.77	+9.87	$41,208.92
Liberal	Dale Stevens	11,222	28.66	-4.40	$51,797.99
Conservative	Steve Streatch	8,363	21.35	-8.24	$66,799.41
Green	David Fullerton	1,007	2.57	–	none listed
Progressive Canadian	Greg Moors	645	1.65	–	none listed
Total valid votes/expense limit		39,162	100.0		$72,023
Total rejected, unmarked and declined ballots		181	0.46		
Turnout		39,343	60.55	+0.89	
Eligible voters		64,979			
New Democratic notional hold		Swing		+7.14	
Changes from 2000 are based on redistributed results. Conservative Party change is based on the combination of Canadian Alliance and Progressive Conservative Party totals.

2000 federal election redistributed results
Party	Vote	%
New Democratic	12,886	35.90
Liberal	11,866	33.06
Progressive Conservative	6,459	18.00
Alliance	4,161	11.59
Others	519	1.45

=== Sackville—Musquodoboit Valley—Eastern Shore ===
==== 2000 ====
2000 Canadian federal election: Sackville—Preston—Chezzetcook
Party	Candidate	Votes	%	±%
New Democratic	Peter Stoffer	13,619	34.48	+4.11
Liberal	Bruce Stephen	12,864	32.56	+6.30
Progressive Conservative	Wade Marshall	7,589	19.21	-11.06
Alliance	Bill Stevens	4,773	12.08	-0.51
Marijuana	Melanie Patriquen	658	1.67	
Total valid votes		39,503	100.00	

Changes for the Canadian Alliance from 1997 are based on the results of its predecessor, the Reform Party.

==== 1997 ====
1997 Canadian federal election: Sackville—Preston—Chezzetcook
Party	Candidate	Votes	%
New Democratic	Peter Stoffer	12,433	30.37
Progressive Conservative	Ken Streatch	12,392	30.27
Liberal	Beverley Peters	10,750	26.26
Reform	Rob Cuthbert	5,155	12.59
Natural Law	Bernard Wayne Gormley	211	0.52
Total valid votes		40,941	100.00

== See also ==
- List of Canadian electoral districts
- Historical federal electoral districts of Canada
