= Braedon Clark =

Canadian politician (born 1988)

Braedon Clark MP

Member of Parliament for Sackville—Bedford—Preston
- Incumbent
- Assumed office April 28, 2025
- Preceded by: Darrell Samson

Member of the Nova Scotia House of Assembly for Bedford South
- In office 17 August 2021 – 27 October 2024
- Preceded by: first member
- Succeeded by: Damian Stoilov

Personal details
- Born: 25 April 1988 (age 38) Halifax, Nova Scotia, Canada
- Party: Liberal
- Other political affiliations: NS Liberal

Braedon Clark (born 25 April 1988) is a Canadian politician, who serves as a Member of Parliament from Bedford, Nova Scotia. Prior to Federal election, he was elected to the Nova Scotia House of Assembly in the 2021 Nova Scotia general election. He represented the riding of Bedford South as a member of the Nova Scotia Liberal Party. Clark was a member of the Public Accounts Committee and the Law Amendments Committee.

As of September 22, 2024, Clark served as the Official Opposition critic for Housing, Healthcare Redevelopment, Service Nova Scotia, and Youth.

On November 26, 2024, Clark was defeated by Damian Stoilov in the 2024 Nova Scotia general election.

Prior to becoming an MLA, Clark worked as a political assistant and in public relations.

Clark was elected as a Liberal Member of Parliament in Sackville—Bedford—Preston for the 2025 Canadian federal election.

== Electoral record ==
2025 Canadian federal election: Sackville—Bedford—Preston
Party	Candidate	Votes	%	±%
Liberal	Braedon Clark	36,062	61.97	+17.32
Conservative	Dave Carroll	18,860	32.41	+7.42
New Democratic	Isaac Wilson	2,324	3.99	-20.79
Green	Andre Anderson	526	0.90	-1.15
People's	Ryan Slaney	418	0.72	-2.77
Total valid votes/expense limit		58,190	99.29	
Total rejected ballots		416	0.71	+0.23
Turnout		58,606	73.16	+8.77
Eligible voters		80,104		
Liberal notional hold		Swing		+4.95
Source: Elections Canada
Note: number of eligible voters does not include voting day registrations.

2024 Nova Scotia general election: Bedford South
Party	Candidate	Votes	%	±%
Progressive Conservative	Damian Stoilov	2,888	41.25	+11.52
Liberal	Braedon Clark	2,786	39.79	-5.58
New Democratic	Isaac G. Wilson	1,243	17.75	-4.67
Green	Ron G. Parker	85	1.21	-0.57
Total valid votes		7,002	99.52	
Total rejected ballots		34	0.48	+0.13
Turnout		7,036	56.92	+1.88
Eligible voters		12,362		
Progressive Conservative gain from Liberal		Swing		+8.55
Source: Elections Nova Scotia

2021 Nova Scotia general election: Bedford South
Party	Candidate	Votes	%	±%	Expenditures
Liberal	Braedon Clark	3,568	45.37	-5.92	$64,408.42
Progressive Conservative	Sura Hadad	2,338	29.73	+0.25	$29,251.32
New Democratic	David Paterson	1,763	22.42	+8.29	$33,813.45
Green	Ron G. Parker	140	1.78	-2.94	$200.00
Atlantica	Alan Nightingale	55	0.70	+0.34	$200.00
Total valid votes/expense limit		7,864	99.65	–	$83,142.54
Total rejected ballots		28	0.35		
Turnout		7,892	55.04		
Eligible voters		14,339			
Liberal notional hold		Swing		-3.09	
Source: Elections Nova Scotia
