= Darrell Samson =

Canadian politician

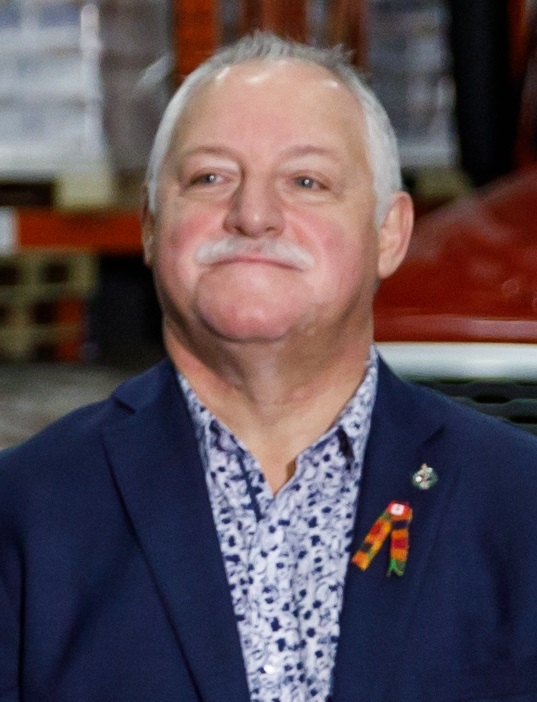
- Samson in 2019

Member of Parliament for Sackville—Preston—Chezzetcook
- In office October 19, 2015 – March 23, 2025
- Preceded by: Peter Stoffer
- Succeeded by: Braedon Clark

Personal details
- Born: October 13, 1958 (age 67) Petit-de-Grat, Nova Scotia, Canada
- Party: Liberal
- Education: Université de Moncton
- Profession: Politician; teacher; school administrator

Darrell Samson (born October 13, 1958) is a Canadian politician who served as the member of Parliament (MP) for Sackville—Preston—Chezzetcook from 2015 until 2025. He is a former superintendent of the Conseil scolaire acadien provincial, Nova Scotia's Acadian and Francophone school board.

== Early life and education ==
An Acadian, Samson is a native of Petit-de-Grat, Isle Madame, Nova Scotia. He attended the Université de Moncton, graduating in 1982 with a Bachelor of Education and in 1984 with a Masters in Education.

== Before politics ==
Samson was a teacher/administrator at Caudle Park Elementary for many years before assuming his role at Conseil scolaire acadien provincial. He has been the national president and vice-president of all French school board superintendents outside Quebec, an active member of the National Committee for Early Years as well as a member of the Provincial Advisory Council to the Minister of Education on Early Years in Nova Scotia.

== Political career ==
Samson was elected to the House of Commons in the 2015 federal election to represent Sackville—Preston—Chezzetcook. In December 2019, he was named the parliamentary secretary to the minister of veterans affairs and associate minister of national defence.

On February 18, 2025, Samson announced that he would not run for re-election during the 2025 Canadian federal election.

== Electoral record ==
2021 Canadian federal election: Sackville—Preston—Chezzetcook
Party	Candidate	Votes	%	±%	Expenditures
Liberal	Darrell Samson	18,838	41.3	+1.1	$68,438.97
Conservative	Angela Conrad	12,047	26.4	+3.8	$24,989.76
New Democratic	Jenna Chisholm	12,012	26.3	+2.4	$23,933.45
People's	Earl Gosse	1,776	3.9	+2.2	$5,292.19
Green	Anthony Edmonds	933	2.0	-9.6	$1,654.05
Total valid votes/expense limit		45,606	99.5	+0.1	$107,534.18
Total rejected ballots		252	0.5	-0.1	
Turnout		45,858	63.5	-6.0	
Registered voters		72,197			
Liberal hold		Swing		-1.4	
Source: Elections Canada

2019 Canadian federal election: Sackville—Preston—Chezzetcook
Party	Candidate	Votes	%	±%	Expenditures
Liberal	Darrell Samson	19,925	40.22	−7.73	$85,306.32
New Democratic	Matt Stickland	11,860	23.94	−10.45	none listed
Conservative	Kevin Copley	11,211	22.63	+7.75	$34,737.99
Green	Anthony Edmonds	5,725	11.56	+8.78	$2,901.53
People's	Sybil Hogg	816	1.65		none listed
Total valid votes/expense limit		49,537	99.36		$104,082.91
Total rejected ballots		320	0.64	+0.27	
Turnout		49,857	69.48	−1.78	
Eligible voters		71,759			
Liberal hold		Swing		+1.36	
Source: Elections Canada

2015 Canadian federal election: Sackville—Preston—Chezzetcook
Party	Candidate	Votes	%	±%	Expenditures
Liberal	Darrell Samson	23,161	47.95	+36.64	$70,884.65
New Democratic	Peter Stoffer	16,613	34.39	–19.90	$56,102.19
Conservative	Robert Strickland	7,186	14.88	–15.31	$16,062.61
Green	Mike Montgomery	1,341	2.78	–1.42	$1,127.68
Total valid votes/expense limit		48,301	99.63		$201,426.67
Total rejected ballots		180	0.37		
Turnout		48,481	71.25		
Eligible voters		68,040			
Liberal gain from New Democratic		Swing		+28.27	
Source: Elections Canada
