= Peter Stoffer =

Canadian politician

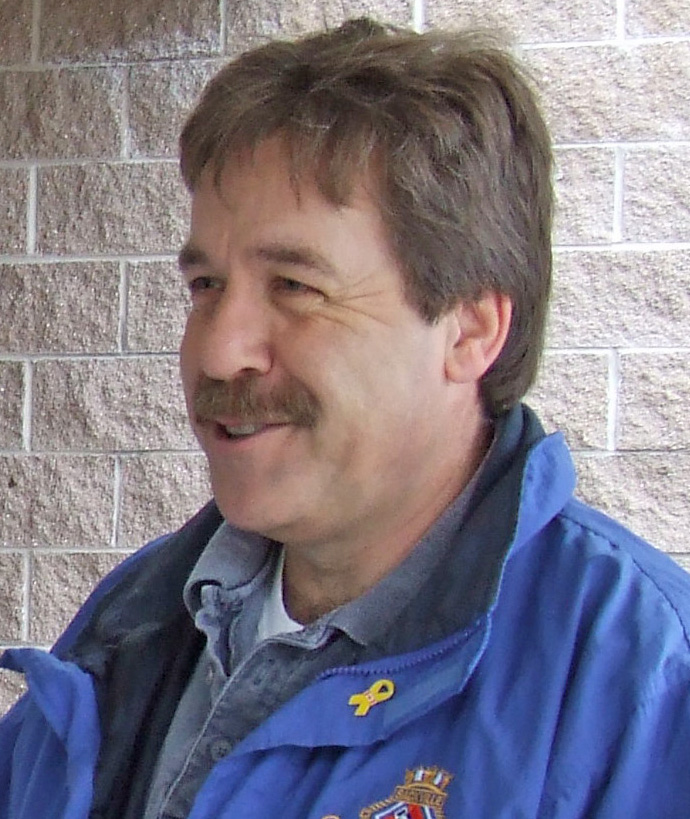
- Stoffer in the spring of 2007 at Lockview High School, Fall River, Nova Scotia, Canada

Shadow Minister for Veterans Affairs
- In office May 26, 2011 – November 19, 2015
- Leader: Jack Layton; Nycole Turmel; Thomas Mulcair
- Preceded by: Kirsty Duncan
- Succeeded by: Alupa Clarke

Member of Parliament for Sackville—Eastern Shore
- In office June 28, 2004 – August 4, 2015
- Preceded by: Riding Established
- Succeeded by: Darrell Samson (Sackville—Preston—Chezzetcook)

Member of Parliament for Sackville—Musquodoboit Valley—Eastern Shore
- In office June 2, 1997 – June 28, 2004
- Preceded by: Riding Established
- Succeeded by: Riding Abolished

Personal details
- Born: Peter Arend Stoffer; January 6, 1956 (age 70) Heerlen, Limburg, Netherlands
- Party: New Democratic Party
- Spouse: Andrea Pottyondy
- Profession: Manager

Peter Arend Stoffer (born January 6, 1956) is a Canadian politician, who represented the riding of Sackville—Eastern Shore or its redistributed equivalents from the 1997 election until his defeat in the 2015 election. A member of the New Democratic Party, Stoffer served as the Official Opposition Critic for Veterans Affairs after his party became the official opposition after the 2011 election.

Stoffer is a grassroots politician who is a strong advocate for Canadian military veterans and their service needs. He has been an advocate of Third Way policies championed by Tony Blair. He was affiliated with the internal party reform group NDProgress that successfully pushed the NDP to adopt a 'one member, one vote' system to choose its leader, and which has called for limits on union influence within the party.

Stoffer was alleged to have attempted to force kisses on a staffer in 2006 and 2009, in allegations made public in 2018. Stoffer denied any wrongdoing and stated that he never intended to "...insult or demean or belittle any person...".

== Early life ==
Stoffer was born in Heerlen, Netherlands in 1956 and emigrated with his family to Canada the same year. His father worked in the coal mines, but after the mines closed down in 1956, Stoffer's family decided to move to Canada. His father became a mail carrier, his mother was a nurse and later they ran a group home for disabled youth. Stoffer is a former airline customer service agent and active union member who was also vocal on environmental issues.

== Federal politics ==
In the 1997 election, Stoffer won his seat, Sackville—Eastern Shore, by 39 votes. Subsequently, however, he increased his margin of victory, in the 2004 election, his plurality was over 6,000 votes. In 2006, he took 53 per cent of the vote, the second placed candidate was over 12,000 votes behind. He was the only Nova Scotia NDP Member of Parliament elected in 1997 to have retained his seat, other than McDonough.

Stoffer represented the redistributed riding of Sackville—Musquodoboit Valley—Eastern Shore after the 2000 election. After the 2004 election, he was re-elected as an MP in an electoral district again renamed to Sackville—Eastern Shore.

During the 2003 NDP leadership convention, Stoffer was the campaign co-chair to Lorne Nystrom, a former long serving NDP MP from Saskatchewan. Days before the leadership convention, Stoffer let it be known to the media that his second ballot intention was to move to support Manitoba MP Bill Blaikie. At the convention, Toronto city councillor Jack Layton was elected on the first ballot.

=== MP under Layton ===
Stoffer has been critical of MPs who cross the floor and has repeatedly introduced a private member's bill banning floor-crossing by Members of Parliament. His proposal, requiring MPs who leave their party to either resign and contest a by-election or sit as independents, was included in a list of demands issued by NDP leader Jack Layton in October 2005, in exchange for continued NDP support of the Liberal minority government. After David Emerson's controversial decision to cross the floor, he has revived this idea.

In 2006 Stoffer withdrew his own private member's bill aimed at preserving Canada's neglected heritage lighthouses, in order to support similar legislation, Heritage Lighthouse Protection Act introduced by Conservative Senator Pat Carney.

In the federal election of 2008, Stoffer received 24,290 votes or 61.5 per cent of the total votes cast. He was more than 16,000 votes ahead of the candidate in second place.

In 2010, Maclean's magazine named him "Most Collegial" in its annual Parliamentarians of the Year awards. This was the second consecutive year that Stoffer received the award, which is voted on by fellow MPs.

=== MP under Mulcair ===
In 2012, Stoffer attracted controversy when he called Conservative MP Rob Anders "a complete dickhead" following comments Anders made insinuating that NDP leader Thomas Mulcair helped hasten the death of former NDP leader Jack Layton. Stoffer apologized to Anders the next day, calling his comments unparliamentary. In 2013, Stoffer was named Canada's Parliamentarian of the Year by his peers in the seventh annual survey of Canada's 305 sitting Members of Parliament (MPs) conducted by Ipsos Reid on behalf of Maclean's in partnership with Historica Canada and L'Actualité, and is designed to honour the public service of Canada’s parliamentarians.

In January 2015, Stoffer declared his support for a Maritime Union of Prince Edward Island, Nova Scotia, and New Brunswick, saying that a union would lower the cost of government services by standardizing laws and regulations.

Stoffer was the Official Opposition Critic for Veterans' Affairs. He is a former critic for Fisheries and Oceans, Shipbuilding, Seniors, Amateur Sport, Canada Post Corporation, Atlantic Canada Opportunities Agency, and National Defence. In Ottawa on Parliament Hill, Stoffer has been consistently voted "Most Fun MP to work for" by The Hill Times newspaper, and is known for the "All Party, Party" – a non-partisan fundraiser for various charities.

== Out of the Commons ==
Stoffer was defeated in the 2015 election as the Liberal party swept all the Atlantic Canada ridings. After his defeat, Stoffer proposed a number of changes for the NDP, including changing its name to the "Democratic Party," disaffiliating the federal and provincial NDP parties, and removing the influence of the Canadian Labour Congress on the party.

== Personal life ==
Stoffer lives in Fall River, Nova Scotia with his wife Andrea, his two daughters (Jasmin and Amber) and his dogs Angel and Buddy. On May 6, 2015, Stoffer was invested by the Dutch as a Knight of the Order of Orange-Nassau.

== Electoral record ==
2015 Canadian federal election: Sackville—Preston—Chezzetcook
Party	Candidate	Votes	%	±%	Expenditures
Liberal	Darrell Samson	23,161	47.95	+36.64	$70,884.65
New Democratic	Peter Stoffer	16,613	34.39	–19.90	$56,102.19
Conservative	Robert Strickland	7,186	14.88	–15.31	$16,062.61
Green	Mike Montgomery	1,341	2.78	–1.42	$1,127.68
Total valid votes/expense limit		48,301	99.63		$201,426.67
Total rejected ballots		180	0.37		
Turnout		48,481	71.25		
Eligible voters		68,040			
Liberal gain from New Democratic		Swing		+28.27	
Source: Elections Canada

2011 Canadian federal election: Sackville—Preston—Chezzetcook
Party	Candidate	Votes	%	±%	Expenditures
New Democratic	Peter Stoffer	22,483	54.07	-7.36	$41,167.28
Conservative	Adam Mimnagh	12,662	30.45	+9.71	$24,555.96
Liberal	Scott Hemming	4,673	11.24	-1.46	$18,619.07
Green	John Percy	1,762	4.24	-0.91	$828.54
Total valid votes/expense limit		41,580	100.0		$83,710.01
Total rejected, unmarked and declined ballots		246	0.59	+0.23	
Turnout		41,826	59.47	+0.95	
Eligible voters		70,329			
New Democratic hold		Swing		-8.54	

2008 Canadian federal election: Sackville—Preston—Chezzetcook
Party	Candidate	Votes	%	±%	Expenditures
New Democratic	Peter Stoffer	24,279	61.43	+8.48	$45,646.87
Conservative	David Montgomery	8,198	20.74	-1.16	$18,400.92
Liberal	Carolyn Scott	5,018	12.70	-10.29	$27,348.88
Green	Noreen Hartlen	2,034	5.15	+2.90	$399.04
Total valid votes/expense limit		39,524	100.0		$80,209
Total rejected, unmarked and declined ballots		142	0.36	+0.10	
Turnout		39,666	58.52	-3.92	
Eligible voters		67,786			
New Democratic hold		Swing		+4.82	

2006 Canadian federal election: Sackville—Preston—Chezzetcook
Party	Candidate	Votes	%	±%	Expenditures
New Democratic	Peter Stoffer	22,848	52.95	+7.18	$55,364.52
Liberal	Bill Fleming	9,921	22.99	-5.67	$30,450.85
Conservative	Paul Francis	9,450	21.90	+0.55	$59,102.04
Green	Richard MacDonald	933	2.16	-0.41	none listed
Total valid votes/expense limit		43,152	100.0		$75,334
Total rejected, unmarked and declined ballots		125	0.29	-0.17	
Turnout		43,277	62.44	+1.89	
Eligible voters		69,311			
New Democratic hold		Swing		+6.42	

2004 Canadian federal election: Sackville—Preston—Chezzetcook
Party	Candidate	Votes	%	±%	Expenditures
New Democratic	Peter Stoffer	17,925	45.77	+9.87	$41,208.92
Liberal	Dale Stevens	11,222	28.66	-4.40	$51,797.99
Conservative	Steve Streatch	8,363	21.35	-8.24	$66,799.41
Green	David Fullerton	1,007	2.57	–	none listed
Progressive Canadian	Greg Moors	645	1.65	–	none listed
Total valid votes/expense limit		39,162	100.0		$72,023
Total rejected, unmarked and declined ballots		181	0.46		
Turnout		39,343	60.55	+0.89	
Eligible voters		64,979			
New Democratic notional hold		Swing		+7.14	
Changes from 2000 are based on redistributed results. Conservative Party change is based on the combination of Canadian Alliance and Progressive Conservative Party totals.

2000 Canadian federal election: Sackville—Preston—Chezzetcook
Party	Candidate	Votes	%	±%
New Democratic	Peter Stoffer	13,619	34.48	+4.11
Liberal	Bruce Stephen	12,864	32.56	+6.30
Progressive Conservative	Wade Marshall	7,589	19.21	-11.06
Alliance	Bill Stevens	4,773	12.08	-0.51
Marijuana	Melanie Patriquen	658	1.67	
Total valid votes		39,503	100.00	

Changes for the Canadian Alliance from 1997 are based on the results of its predecessor, the Reform Party.

1997 Canadian federal election: Sackville—Preston—Chezzetcook
Party	Candidate	Votes	%
New Democratic	Peter Stoffer	12,433	30.37
Progressive Conservative	Ken Streatch	12,392	30.27
Liberal	Beverley Peters	10,750	26.26
Reform	Rob Cuthbert	5,155	12.59
Natural Law	Bernard Wayne Gormley	211	0.52
Total valid votes		40,941	100.00
