= Illinois State Police Office (Pontiac) =

- Illinois State Police Office, Pontiac
- U.S. National Register of Historic Places
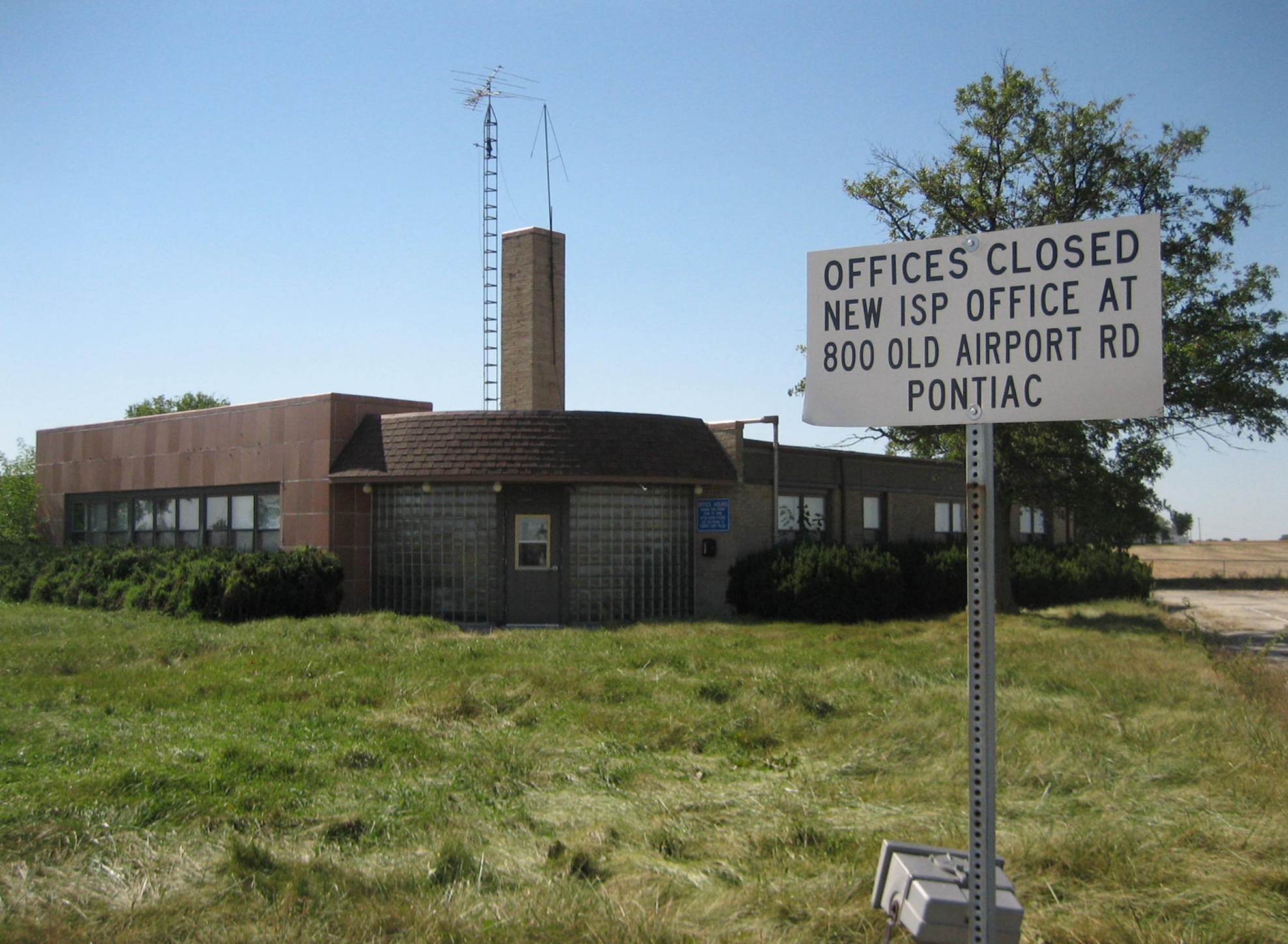
- Location: Pontiac, Livingston County, Illinois, USA
- Coordinates: 40°51′3″N 88°39′21″W
- Area: 2.56 acres
- Built: 1941
- Architect: Illinois, Department of Public works and Buildings, Division of Architecture and Engineering
- Architectural style: Art Moderne
- NRHP reference No.: 07000117
- Added to NRHP: March 7, 2007

The former Illinois State Police Office in Pontiac, Illinois, United States served as the Illinois State Police District 6 headquarters from its construction in 1941 until 2003. The building, located along old U.S. Route 66, was listed on the U.S. National Register of Historic Places in 2007.

== History ==
=== Building ===
The Illinois State Police Office south of Pontiac, Illinois along U.S. Route 66 was constructed in 1941 as the headquarters for the Illinois State Police District 6. The building was one of the first headquarters buildings to be built during the era.

The new headquarters building was constructed and traffic along Route 66 continued to increase throughout the 1940s. In 1944 the route was widened to four lanes through this region of Illinois and two additional highway lanes were constructed directly in front of the building. When Interstate 55 was built about a half mile (800 m) to the west of the route during the 1970s traffic on 66 began to decrease. The Illinois State Police remained headquartered in the Pontiac U.S. Route 66 building until 2003. The building was vacated when a new facility was constructed in Pontiac, the old structure had become expensive to maintain and subject to repeated flooding issues. The building is vacant as of 2003.

After being listed on the U.S. National Register of Historic Places in March 2007, preservationists received word that a bill had passed the Illinois House of Representatives authorizing the state to pass ownership of the building to Livingston County. The bill was sponsored by a state representative from nearby Chenoa, Dan Rutherford, who called the building "part of the heritage of Route 66." A similar bill passed the Illinois Senate on August 23, 2007 and was enacted as law the same day.

=== District six ===
The 6th District of the Illinois State Police was originally established as District 9 and it was one of initial five police districts established when the State Police were officially founded in April 1922. Its original base of operations was in Kankakee, as was the headquarters for the entire State Police agency. The district covered Cook, Will, Iroquois, and Vermilion Counties upon its inception. In 1935 the district renamed as District 6, and its coverage area was altered to just include the counties of Kankakee, Ford, Iroquois, McLean and Livingston. It was at this time that the headquarters was moved into a rented building along U.S Route 66 near Pontiac.

The official groundbreaking for the new headquarters took place in August 2001 and was attended by then-Illinois Governor George Ryan. The new headquarters building, a 23,000-square-foot (2,100 m^{2}) facility, was the result of successive requests from the Illinois State Police every year since 1979.

== Architecture ==
The Pontiac State Police Office is cast in the Art Moderne style, reflecting the sleek, streamlined look of new automobiles during the era. The streamline effect is reflected through the structure's use of curved corners, smooth surfaces and structural glass bricks. The building's interior contains a large squad room, used for meetings, office space, a public lobby and a garage bay for cars and motorcycles.

The one-story building has two main wings. The north wing was originally the administrative area and the south wing a garage. The building's layout has been referred to as "pistol-shaped." The same design was used by the Illinois State Police in the construction of the headquarters building at Rock Island.
