= Damian Stoilov =

Canadian politician

Member of the Nova Scotia House of Assembly for Bedford South
- Incumbent
- Assumed office November 26, 2024
- Preceded by: Braedon Clark

Personal details
- Party: Progressive Conservative

Damian Stoilov is a Canadian politician who was elected to the Nova Scotia House of Assembly in the 2024 general election, representing Bedford South as a member of the Progressive Conservative Association of Nova Scotia.

Stoilov is a business owner and a community volunteer.
