= Bedford South =

Provincial electoral district in Nova Scotia, Canada

Nova Scotia electoral district

Provincial electoral district
- Legislature: Nova Scotia House of Assembly
MLA
Damian Stoilov
Progressive Conservative
- District created: 2019
- First contested: 2024

Demographics
- Area (km²): 31
- Census division: Halifax Regional Municipality
- Census subdivision: Halifax Regional Municipality

Bedford South is a provincial electoral district in Nova Scotia, Canada, that elects one member of the Nova Scotia House of Assembly.

This riding was created in 2019, following the recommendations of the 2018 Electoral Boundaries Commission. This riding was first contested in the 2021 election.

== Geography ==
The land area of Bedford South is 31 km^{2} (12 sq mi).

== Members of the Legislative Assembly ==
This riding has elected the following MLAs:

Bedford South
| Legislature | Years | Member | Party |
|---|---|---|---|
Riding created from Bedford, Clayton Park West and Hammonds Plains-Lucasville
| 64th | 2021–2024 | Braedon Clark | Liberal |
| 64th | 2024–present | Damian Stoilov | Progressive Conservative |

== Election results ==
=== 2024 ===
2024 Nova Scotia general election
** Preliminary results — Not yet official **
| Party | Candidate | Votes | % | ±% |
|---|---|---|---|---|
| Progressive Conservative | Damian Stoilov | 2,888 | 41.25 | +11.52 |
| Liberal | Braedon Clark | 2,786 | 39.79 | -5.58 |
| New Democratic | Isaac G. Wilson | 1,243 | 17.75 | -4.67 |
| Green | Ron G. Parker | 85 | 1.21 | -0.57 |
| Total valid votes | | 7,002 | 99.52 | |
| Total rejected ballots | | 34 | 0.48 | +0.13 |
| Turnout | | 7,036 | 56.92 | +1.88 |
| Eligible voters | | 12,362 | | |
| Progressive Conservative gain from Liberal | | Swing | | +8.55 |

=== 2021 ===
2021 Nova Scotia general election
| Party | Candidate | Votes | % | ±% | Expenditures |
|---|---|---|---|---|---|
| Liberal | Braedon Clark | 3,568 | 45.37 | -5.92 | $64,408.42 |
| Progressive Conservative | Sura Hadad | 2,338 | 29.73 | +0.25 | $29,251.32 |
| New Democratic | David Paterson | 1,763 | 22.42 | +8.29 | $33,813.45 |
| Green | Ron G. Parker | 140 | 1.78 | -2.94 | $200.00 |
| Atlantica | Alan Nightingale | 55 | 0.70 | +0.34 | $200.00 |
| Total valid votes/expense limit | | 7,864 | 99.65 | – | $83,142.54 |
| Total rejected ballots | | 28 | 0.35 | | |
| Turnout | | 7,892 | 55.04 | | |
| Eligible voters | | 14,339 | | | |
| Liberal notional hold | | Swing | | -3.09 | |
Source: Elections Nova Scotia

=== 2017 redistributed results ===
2017 provincial election redistributed results
| Party | Vote | % |
|---|---|---|
| Liberal | 3,029 | 51.30 |
| Progressive Conservative | 1,741 | 29.48 |
| New Democratic | 835 | 14.14 |
| Green | 279 | 4.72 |
| Atlantica Party | 21 | 0.36 |

== See also ==
- List of Nova Scotia provincial electoral districts
- Canadian provincial electoral districts
