= United Breaks Guitars =

Single by Dave Carroll
- Released: July 6, 2009
- Genre: Country; folk; comedy
- Length: 4:36
- Label: Dave Carroll Music
- Songwriter: Dave Carroll

Music video
- "United Breaks Guitars (Official Video)" on YouTube

"United Breaks Guitars" is a protest song by Canadian musician Dave Carroll and his band, Sons of Maxwell. It chronicles a real-life experience of how his guitar was broken during a trip on United Airlines in 2008 and the obstructively uncooperative reaction from the airline. The song became an immediate YouTube and iTunes hit upon its release in July 2009.

== Background ==
Musician Dave Carroll said his guitar was broken while in United Airlines' custody. He said that he heard a fellow passenger exclaim that baggage handlers on the ramp at Chicago O'Hare International Airport were throwing guitars during a layover on his flight from Halifax Stanfield International Airport to Omaha, Nebraska's Eppley Airfield. He arrived at his destination to discover his $3,500 Taylor guitar was severely damaged.

Carrol said that back then he didn't have the money to buy such expensive guitars which made the entire incident much worse.

In his song, he sang that he "alerted three employees who showed complete indifference towards [him]" when he raised the matter in Chicago. Carroll filed a claim with United Airlines, which informed him that he was ineligible for compensation because he had failed to make a claim within its stipulated "standard 24-hour timeframe".

== Writing and composition ==
Carroll says that his fruitless negotiations with the airline lasted about nine months. Then, asking himself, "if Michael Moore was a singer-songwriter, what would he do?", Carroll wrote a song and created a music video about his experience. The song's refrain includes "I should have flown with someone else, or gone by car / 'Cause United breaks guitars." Carroll, who has performed as a solo artist and a member of the group Sons of Maxwell, wrote two sequel songs related to the events. The second video, "United Breaks Guitars: Song 2", was released on YouTube on August 17, 2009. The song takes a humorous look at Carroll's dealings with "the unflappable" United customer service employee Ms. Irlweg; it targets the "flawed policies" that she was forced to uphold. In March 2010, "United Breaks Guitars: Song 3" was released. The song notes that not all employees at United are "bad apples." The final line of the trilogy of songs is, "You say that you're changing, and I hope you do / 'Cause if you don't, then who would fly with you?"

== Response ==
The YouTube video was posted on July 6, 2009. It amassed 150,000 views within one day, prompting United to contact Carroll, saying it hoped to right the wrong. The video had over half a million views by July 9, 5 million by mid-August 2009, 10 million by February 2011, and 15 million by August 2015. It has roughly 30 million views and 923,000 likes as of January 2026.

Media reported the story of the song's instant success and the public relations humiliation for United Airlines. Attempting to put a positive gloss on the incident and the song, a company spokesman called it "excellent". Rob Bradford, United's managing director of customer solutions, telephoned Carroll to apologize for the incident and to ask for permission to use the video for internal training. United claimed that it hoped to learn from the incident, and to change its customer service policy accordingly.

Bob Taylor, owner of Taylor Guitars, immediately offered Carroll two guitars and other props for his second video. The song hit number one on the iTunes Music Store the week following its release. The belated compensation offer of $3,000, which United donated to the Thelonious Monk Institute of Jazz as a "gesture of goodwill," failed to undo the damage done to its image (it was later revealed that the Thelonious Monk Institute of Jazz was, at the time, chaired largely by United executives and used United Airlines exclusively for its corporate travel). In response to his protest's success, Carroll posted a video address thanking the public for their support while urging a more understanding and civil attitude towards Ms. Irlweg, who was just doing her job in accordance with mandated company policies in this affair.

Since the incident, Carroll has been in great demand as a speaker on customer service. Coincidentally, United Airlines lost his luggage on one of his trips as a speaker.

In December 2009, Time magazine named "United Breaks Guitars" No. 7 on its list of the Top 10 Viral Videos of 2009.

In January 2012, Carroll and "United Breaks Guitars" were featured in the CBC/CNBC documentary Customer (Dis)Service.

In May 2012, Carroll published a book, United Breaks Guitars: The Power of One Voice in the Age of Social Media, detailing his experiences.

In January 2013, the success of Carroll's online protest was used by the German television and news service Tagesschau to exemplify a new kind of threat facing corporations in the internet age.

In June 2013, NBC's Today Show discussed "how to properly complain and get what you want" and used a Carroll video as an example of an excellent way to complain while remaining "respectful" and "not yelling".

In April 2017, Carroll stated in an interview with As It Happens that the same problem in his song had emerged in the incident aboard Flight 3411 in which a passenger was forcibly removed from a plane, and thought it had to do with the culture in United Airlines which showed a lack of compassion.

== Stock price effect ==
It was widely reported that within four weeks of the video being posted online, United Airlines' stock price fell 10%, costing stockholders about $180 million in value. But this claim is difficult to substantiate. On July 6, 2009, United Airlines opened at $3.31 and dipped to an intra-day low $3.07 (-7.25%) on 10 July, but that very day closed at $3.26 and traded as high as $6.00 (+81.27%) four weeks later on August 6.

== See also ==
- Tom Paxton had a similar experience with Republic Airlines, which he recounted in the song "Thank You, Republic Airlines" on his 1985 album One Million Lawyers and Other Disasters.
- Bing Futch § Northwest Airlines incident
- 2017 United Express passenger removal
