= Sons of Maxwell =

Canadian folk music group

Sons of Maxwell is a Canadian music duo who perform both traditional Celtic folk music and original compositions with a pop-folk sound. The duo consists of brothers Don Carroll and Dave Carroll, originally from Timmins, Ontario, residing in Halifax, Nova Scotia, since 1994. They began singing together while studying at Carleton University in Ottawa under the band name "The Don and Dave Show" in 1989. One recording was released under that name. They re-christened themselves S.O.M. in 1993, in honour of their father (Max Carroll).

In July 2009, the band became an international media sensation when they released the protest song and music video, "United Breaks Guitars", explaining how, after United Airlines personnel damaged their musical instruments, the airline refused to take responsibility or give compensation for the loss. As a result, in addition to his musical career, Dave Carroll regularly gives speeches about customer service.

== Career ==
Brothers Don and Dave Carroll began singing together while attending Carleton University in Ottawa. After graduation, they began a full-time professional music career. Sons of Maxwell has toured extensively both in Canada and internationally. The group won an East Coast Music Award in 2006 for the Vibe Marketing Country Recording of the Year with Sunday Morning. The Sons of Maxwell also won an ECMA in 2002 for Roots Traditional Group of the Year with Among The Living. They are 5 time ECMA nominees.

Dave Carroll was named Digital Artist of the Year and Video of the Year at the Nova Scotia Awards in 2009.

== United Airlines incident ==
The incident, which occurred on March 31, 2008, when the band was flying from Halifax to Omaha, Nebraska on United Airlines, resulted in the damage of a guitar belonging to Dave Carroll. After months of unsuccessful wrangling for reparations, Carroll wrote "United Breaks Guitars" to chronicle the real-life experience of how his guitar was broken and the subsequent stonewalling reaction from the airline. The song became an immediate YouTube and ITMS hit upon its release in July 2009 and a public relations humiliation for United Airlines; The Times reported that four days after the song's release, the company's share price "plunged by 10 per cent, costing shareholders $180 million". A second video, "United Breaks Guitars: Song 2" was released on YouTube on August 18, 2009. The song takes a closer look at Dave Carroll's dealings with Ms. Irlweg and targets the flawed policies that she was forced to uphold. The third song, "'United We Stand' on the Right Side of Right," was released on March 1, 2010, as a humorous coda to the incident. In the song, Carroll sings how he is largely satisfied with the resolution of the affair since it has given his career a spectacular boost. However, he also notes that many people have shared their similar complaints with businesses and they must not be underestimated again.

Carroll now gives public speeches about his experiences and his thoughts about customer service. Furthermore, he has also published a book, United Breaks Guitars: The Power of One Voice in the Age of Social Media. In addition, in April 2017, he was interviewed on Canadian media such as CBC and CTV for a domestic perspective on the United Express Flight 3411 incident where a passenger was forcibly removed from a plane due to overbooking. Furthermore, Carroll also released a YouTube video detailing his thoughts on the incident and how his third protest song already states his general opinions about United and how they need to change. In this situation, Carroll considers a fourth "United Breaks Guitars" song unnecessary at this time, although he reserves the right to write one if the situation changes enough to warrant it.

== Personal life ==
Aside from their busy music schedule, the Carroll brothers have also served as volunteer firefighters. Don Carroll became a career firefighter in 2008.

On April 16, 2024, Dave Carroll announced he was seeking the Conservative Party of Canada nomination for the riding of Sackville—Bedford—Preston in the 2025 Canadian federal election. He won the nomination on June 26. He lost the race to Braedon Clark.

== Discography ==
The Carroll brothers are also solo artists. Dave Carroll has released and toured his album of original work, Perfect Blue, and in 2012 released an album called Raincoat in Vegas.

Don Carroll, featuring his swing band, released a collection of his favourite jazz standards entitled Valentine Delivered in 2008.

In addition, Sons of Maxwell has released the following albums singles and music videos:

=== Albums and song tracks ===
Year	Album	Tracks
1994	Sons of Maxwell	Maggie; Closing the Mine; Mr. Tanner; Sixteen for Awhile; Farewell to Nova Scotia; Closer to Fine; Never No More; Early One Morning; Cecilia; Mairi's Wedding/Tell My Ma
1995	Bold Frontier	Free to Be; The Mary Ellen Carter; Mary's Song; Sixteen for Awhile; I'm Your Man; Old Dan's Records; Sailor's Story; Piano Man; Maggie; Street Man's Confession; Bold Frontier
1998	Live at Tim's House	Wild Colonial Boy; Fox on the Run; Ste. Anne's Reel; Rocky Road to Dublin; Field's of France; Irish Rover; 16 Tons; Ramblin' Rover; Country Boy (Thank GOD!); Those were the days; Pack up your troubles-Long way to Tipperary-Roll out the Barrell
1998	The Neighbourhood	The Neighbourhood, Will You Come Home, Queen of Argyle, The Lighthouse, Pandora, So Many Things, These Things I Believe, Oceanside Again, And We Danced, Prospectors
2000	Sailor's Story	Farewell to Nova Scotia; Mary Mac; Sonny's Dream; Peter Street; Yellow Submarine; The Irish Rover; Barrett's Privateers; The Mermaid; Last Shanty; The Leaving of Liverpool
2000	Among the Living	Among The Living; So Confusing; Mile A Minute; Lady From L.A.; Mrs. Stanley; Burning Bridges; The 5:07; Easy Come Easy Go; Working Man; When The Circus Comes To Town; Hold On; Get It Jumpin'
2000	Instant Christmas	Christmas in Kllarney; Cape Breton Christmas Eve; O Holy Night; Christmas Time at Home; Bleak Mid Winter; Let It Snow; Mele Malikimaka/Hawaiian Christmas; First Christmas Away From Home; Go Tell It on the Mountain; I Saw Three Ships
2004	Sunday Morning	The Best Things; Uphill Battle; Like You Do; You Let Me Love You; Everyone; Live in the Movies; Games People Play; Whole Lot Lighter; Everyday of Your Life; Give Me a Reason; I'm Willing; The Best Things; Mr. Nobody; Sunday Morning

=== Singles ===
Year	Single	CAN Country	Album
1998	"The Neighbourhood"		The Neighbourhood
1999	"And We Danced"	54	The Neighbourhood
1999	"Oceanside Again"		The Neighbourhood
2000	"Queen of Argyle"		The Neighbourhood
2001	"So Confusing"		Among the Living
2002	"Burning Bridges"		Among the Living
2004	"The Best of Things"		Sunday Morning
2005	"Uphill Battle"		Sunday Morning
2009	"United Breaks Guitars"		Non-album song
