= United Master Executive Council =

Union for United Airlines pilots

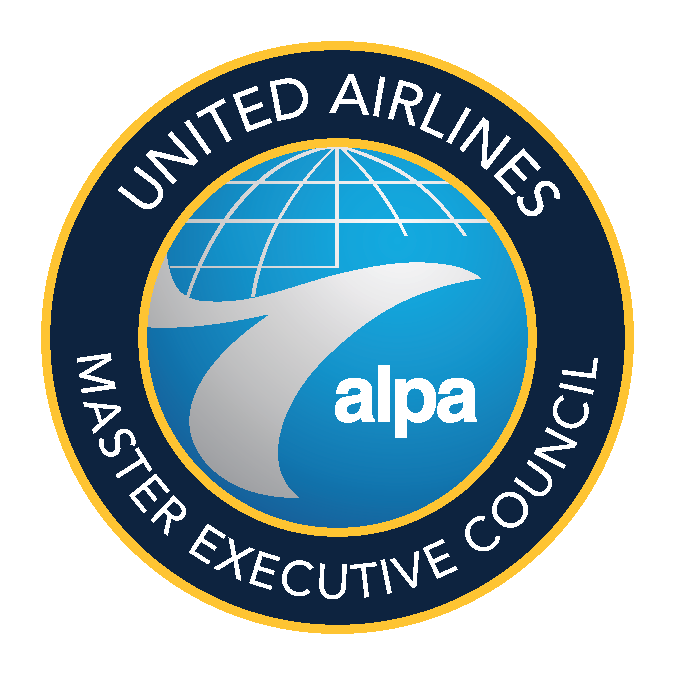
United MEC logo

The United Airlines pilot Master Executive Council (MEC) of the Air Line Pilots Association, International (ALPA) is the administrative body that represents United Airlines pilots.

The UAL MEC represents over 18,000 pilots at United as their formal collective bargaining agent under the Railway Labor Act. They are responsible for negotiating pilot contracts, in addition to enhancing airline safety and security.

== History ==
On July 27, 1931, under the leadership of United Captain Dave Behncke, the Air Line Pilots Association (ALPA) was created. Captain Dave Behncke served as ALPA's first president, from 1931 until 1951, during which time ALPA became active in Washington, D.C. and worked to secure legislation that made the airline piloting profession safer for both workers and passengers. Today, the United MEC continues its history of involvement on Capitol Hill, along with promoting legislation that benefits pilots, advances airline safety, and enhances security.

The ALPA motto is "Schedule with Safety" and many of the safety features found in current aircraft and airports are the result of United ALPA volunteer initiatives. Their contract, the United Pilot Agreement, establishes work rules and provides for higher pay, making them one of the highest paid pilot groups in the industry.

== Leadership ==
The United MEC Officers are elected by local council reps and serve a two-year term. MEC Chair Capt. Brian Noyes, MEC Vice Chair Capt. Phil Di Costanzo, MEC Secretary Capt. Brian Bunkers, and MEC Treasurer Capt. Drew Minarcik.

On the local level, the United MEC consists of member-elected representatives at the eleven United domiciles throughout the United States and Guam. Local pilot volunteers form the foundation of the committee, and full-time ALPA staff assist the group with legal, administrative, and communications support.

== Notable Events ==
- ALPA was founded by United Captain David L. Behncke and 23 other key figures in Chicago, Illinois, on July 27, 1931. In the 1930s, flying was a perilous occupation; thus, from the time of its formation, one of ALPA’s main goals was to improve air safety.
- On May 17, 1985, United Pilot commenced a 29 day strike as United Airlines Chairman Richard Ferris pushed for a two-tier pay scale for pilots.
