= Illinois State Police =

State police force of Illinois, US

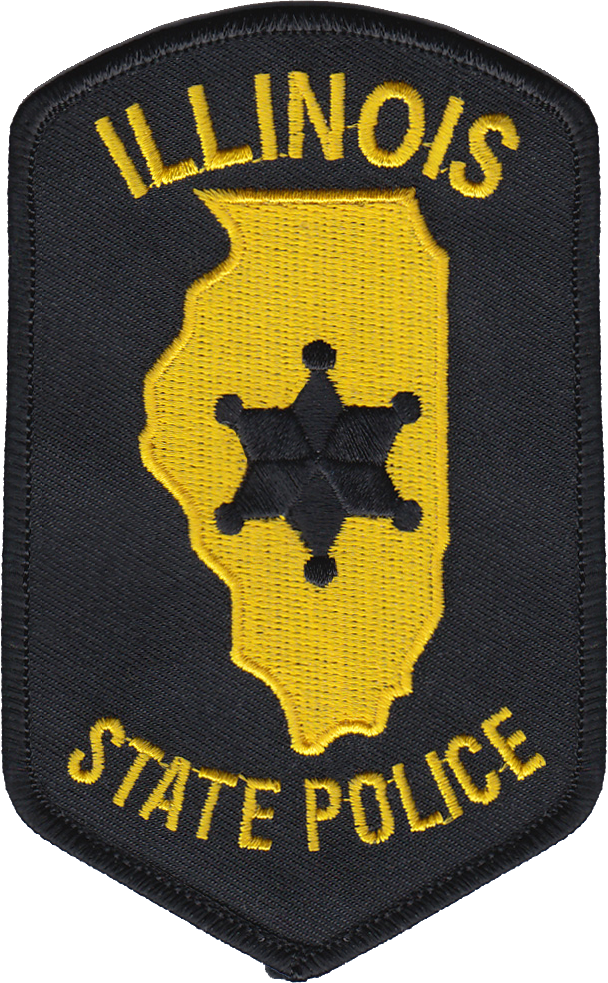
- The current Illinois State Police patch, adopted in 1988

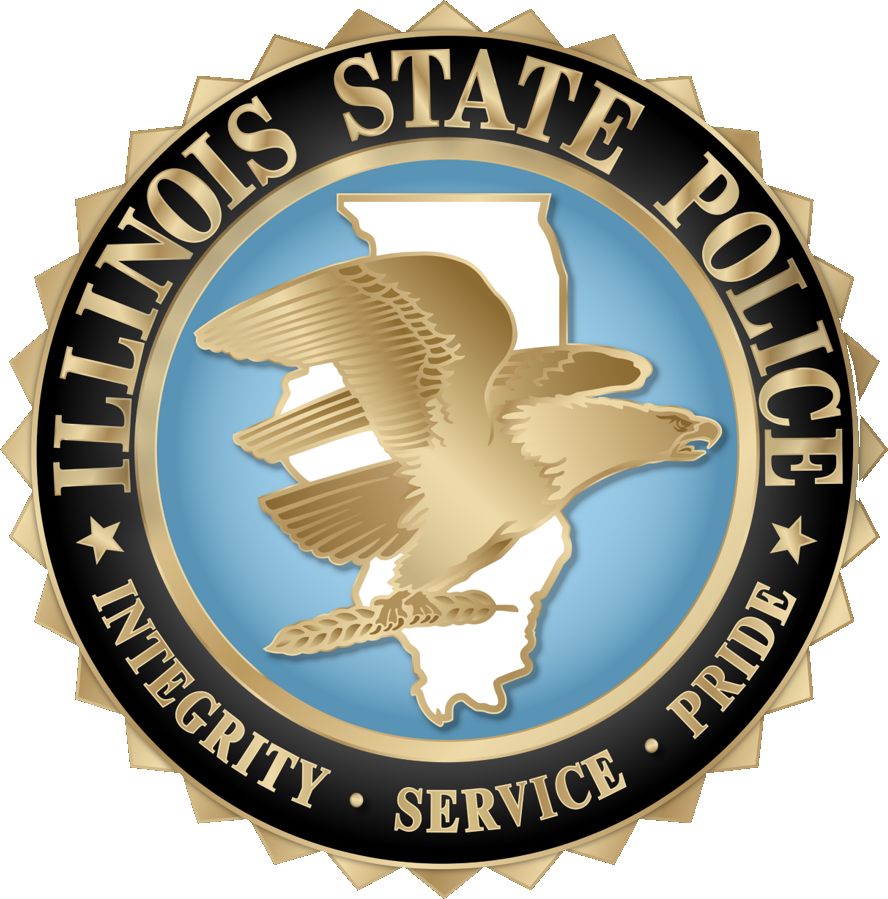
- Seal of the Illinois State Police

- Badge of an ISP trooper

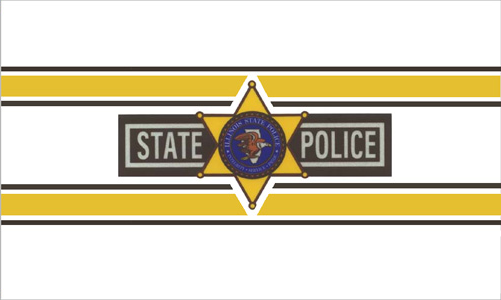
- Flag of the Illinois State Police
- Abbreviation: ISP
- Motto: Integrity, Service, Pride

Agency overview
- Formed: April 1, 1922; 104 years ago
- Employees: 2,702 (as of April 1, 2022)

Jurisdictional structure
- Operations jurisdiction: Illinois, U.S.
- Area: 57,918 sq mi (140,998 km^{2})
- Population: 12,671,821 (2020 est.)
- Legal jurisdiction: State of Illinois
- Governing body: Governor of Illinois
- General nature: Civilian police

Operational structure
- Overseen by: Illinois State Police Merit Board
- Headquarters: 801 South Seventh Street; Springfield, Illinois
- Troopers: 1,846 (actual, as of December 1, 2020)
- Civilian members: 899 (as of April 1, 2022)
- Agency executive: Brendan F. Kelly, Director

Facilities
- Troops: 10: 1: Pecatonica, Sterling; 2: La Salle, East Moline; 3: Des Plaines, Elgin, Joliet; 4: Macomb, Metamora; 5: Pontiac, Ashkum; 6: Springfield, Pittsfield; 7: Pesotum; 8: Collinsville, Litchfield; 9: Effingham, Carmi; 10: DuQuoin, Ullin
- Patrol cars: Ford Explorer, Expedition, Taurus, Chevy Caprice, Dodge Chargers, and Harley Davidson motorcycles

Website
- isp.illinois.gov

The Illinois State Police (ISP) is the state police agency of the U.S. state of Illinois. The Illinois State Police is responsible for traffic safety on more than 300,000 miles of total roadway, including 2,185 miles of interstate highways and 15,969 miles of state highways. Currently, almost 3,000 sworn and civilian personnel make up the Illinois State Police.

== Troops and organization ==
Demographics comparison
	ISP
Male	72%
Female	28%
White	82%
Black or African-American	9%
Hispanic	7%
Asian	2%

=== Organization ===
The Illinois State Police is currently organized into several divisions, commands, offices and bureaus:

- Office of the Director:
  - First Deputy Director
    - Chief of Staff
      - Office of Equal Employment Opportunity
      - Office of Finance
      - Office of Human Resources
      - Office and Inspection & Audits
      - Office of Labor Relations and Special Projects
      - Legal Office
      - Deputy Chief of Staff for Special Counsels Major Case Counsel
        - Firearms Safety Office Counsel
      - Deputy Chief of Staff for External Affairs Senior Public Safety Policy Advisor
        - Office of Governmental Affairs
        - Executive Office
        - Public Information Office
      - Deputy Chief of Staff Office of Operational & Strategic Planning
        - Executive Protection Unit
        - Office of Strategic Planning & Special Projects
        - Office of Research & Development
- Division of Justice Services (Colonel):
  - Administrative Support Command
    - Logistics
    - Department of Innovation and Technology
  - Criminal Justice Services Command
    - Bureau of Identification
    - Program Administration Bureau
  - Public Safety services Command
    - Firearms Services Bureau
    - Regulatory Services Bureau
- Division of Forensic Services (Deputy Director):
  - Chief of Staff
    - Fiscal Administrator
    - Personnel Administrator
    - Case File Administrator (FOIA)
  - Assistant Deputy Director
    - Forensic Sciences Command
    - Crime Scene & Evidence Services Command
    - Quality Assurance
- Division of Internal Investigation (Deputy Director):
  - Administrative Services Command
    - Background Investigations Unit
    - Identified Offender Program
  - Northern Command
  - Southern Command
- Division of Patrol (Colonel):
  - Patrol Operations Command
    - North Central Patrol Command
      - Troops 1, 2, 4, 5, 6
    - Chicago Patrol Command
      - Troop 3
    - Southern Patrol Command
      - Troops 7, 8, 9, 10
  - Strategic Operations Command
    - Support Servies Command
      - Special Operations
        - SAVE
        - H.I.T.
      - Support Services
        - Criminal Patrol
        - Motorcycle Enforcement Bureau
        - Vehicle Investigations Coordinator
        - Commercial Vehicle Section
        - Crowd Control
        - Administrative Support
      - Protective Service Unit
- Division of Criminal Investigation (Colonel):
  - Investigative Command
    - Research & Development
    - Northern Major
      - Zones 1, 2, 3
    - Central Major
      - Zones 4, 5
    - Southern Major
      - Zones 6, 7, 8
  - Support Command
    - Special Operations Command/Air Operations
    - Investigative Support Command
    - Intelligence Command
    - Special Investigation Unit
    - Statewide Gaming Command
  - Chief of Staff
    - Deputy Chief of Staff
      - Statewide Investigative Training Special Projects Coordinator
- Division of the Academy and Training (Colonel):
  - Staff/Special Projects Officer
    - Honor Guard
      - Trumpet Team
      - Pipes & Drum Team
  - Academy Commander
    - Physical Skills Bureau
    - Recruitment and Substance Testing Bureau
    - Logistics Bureau
    - Training Development Bureau
- Division Statewide 911 (Colonel):
  - Statewide 911 Administrator
  - Assistant Deputy Director
    - Statewide 911 Bureau
    - Telecommunications Services Bureau
    - Radio Network Services Bureau
    - Fleet Services Bureau

=== Troops ===
The Illinois State Police reorganized from districts into troops, as of January 1, 2023.

Troop	Headquarters	Counties covered
1	Sterling, Pecatonica	Carroll, Jo Daviess, Lee, Ogle, Stephenson, Whiteside, and Winnebago
2	LaSalle, East Moline	Bureau, Henry, LaSalle, Mercer, Putnam, and Rock Island
3	Des Plaines, Elgin, Lockport	Boone, Cook, DeKalb, DuPage, Grundy, Kane, Kendall, Lake, McHenry, and Will
4	Macomb, Metamora	Fulton, Hancock, Henderson, Knox, Marshall, McDonough, Peoria, Stark, Tazewell, Warren, and Woodford
5	Ashkum, Pontiac	DeWitt, Ford, Iroquois, Kankakee, Livingston, and McLean
6	Pittsfield, Springfield	Adams, Brown, Cass, Christian, Logan, Mason, Menard, Morgan, Pike, Sangamon, Schuyler, and Scott
7	Pesotum	Champaign, Coles, Douglas, Edgar, Macon, Moultrie, Piatt, Shelby and Vermilion
8	Collinsville, Litchfield	Bond, Clinton, Calhoun, Greene, Jersey, Macoupin, Madison, Montgomery, Monroe, St. Clair, and Washington
9	Carmi, Effingham	Clark, Clay, Crawford, Cumberland, Edwards, Effingham, Fayette, Hamilton, Jasper, Lawrence, Marion, Richland, Wabash, Wayne, and White
10	Du Quoin, Ullin	Alexander, Franklin, Gallatin, Hardin, Jackson, Jefferson, Johnson, Massac, Perry, Pope, Pulaski, Randolph, Saline, Union and Williamson

== Traffic enforcement ==
Illinois State Police currently use various methods for speed limit enforcement on Illinois highways, including hand-held and moving radar, LIDAR, pacing, air speed utilizing the ISP fleet of aircraft, and VASCAR. ISP uses typical marked units (Ford Explorer, Expedition, and Taurus, Chevrolet Caprice) as well as unmarked units. Since 2006, photo radar mounted in vans has been used for speed enforcement in construction zones statewide. Though the vans are used by ISP officers, Conduent, a private company, provides the vans for a fee.

ISP has four Cessna 182 airplanes used for law enforcement efforts throughout the state. Three of the four aircraft are equipped with forward looking infrared cameras. All pilots assigned to the Air Operations Bureau began their career at ISP as troopers. ISP pilots respond to calls for service 24/7 and at no cost to the user agency. Routine calls for service include, but are not limited to, missing persons searches, criminal manhunts, surveillance, pursuits, photo/video needs, civil unrest, patrol support, and transportation. Since 1959, ISP has also used aircraft for speed enforcement, using stopwatch time measurement.

== Illinois State Police Merit Board ==
The Illinois State Police Merit Board administers certification for the appointment and promotion of state police officers, as well as their discipline, removal, demotion, and suspension measures. The board consists of five civilian members appointed by the governor with the advice and consent of the State Senate. Each member serves a six-year term, and no more than three members may be affiliated with the same political party.

== List of ISP superintendents and directors ==
=== Superintendents ===
- John T. Stack (1922–1929)
- Walter L. Moody (1929–1933)
- Lawrence M. Taylor (1933–1935)†
- Walter Williams (1935–1941)
- Jesse H. Grissom (1941)
- T.P. Sullivan (1941)
- Leo M. Carr (1941–1942)
- Harry Yde (1942–1945)
- Harry I. Curtis (1945–1950)
- Thomas J. O'Donnell (1950–1953)
- Philip M. Brown (1953–1956)
- William H. Morris (1956–1968)
- Albert S. Hinds (1968–1969)
- James T. McGuire (1969–1971)
- Dwight E. Pitman (1971–1977)
- Lynn E. Baird (1977–1979)
- Ronald J. Miller (1979–1983)
- Laimutis A. Nargelenas (1983–1987)

=== Directors ===
- James B. Zagel (1980–1987)* Director of Department of Law Enforcement 1980–1985, Director of Department of State Police 1985-1987
- Jeremy D. Margolis (1987–1991)
- Terrance W. Gainer (1991–1998)
- Sam W. Nolen (1998–2003)
- Larry G. Trent (2003–2009)
- Jonathon E. Monken (2009–2011)
- Hiram Grau (2011–2015)
- Leo P. Schmitz (2015–2019)
- Brendan F. Kelly (2019– )

== Line of duty deaths ==
Since the establishment of the Illinois State Police, 74 troopers have died while on duty.

== Uniform and armament ==
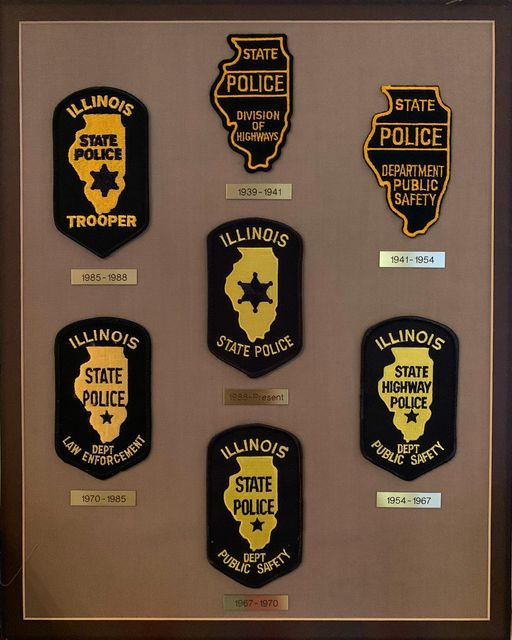
Uniform patches of the ISP since 1939

The ISP uniform has a distinct look that separate it from its neighbors. Instead of a chocolate brown uniform worn by the Iowa State Patrol, or a light blue on dark blue uniform worn by the Missouri State Highway Patrol, ISP officers wear light tan/khaki shirts, and dark green pants with black trim. Dress uniforms include a jacket that matches the pants. Starting with CC 150, Sam Browne style crossbody belts will be added to the dress blouse. The cold weather gear incorporates a brown, all-weather jacket. Leather duty gear consists of black high gloss clarino holsters, belts, and accessories. ISP officers wear a dark brown campaign hat called a Montana Peak.

The badge, instead of a traditional shield surmounted by an eagle design, is a six-pointed star that reads the rank of the trooper, and the words "Illinois State Police" in black, along with the officer's badge number (beginning in 2002). The badge's sequential inventory number is found stamped on the reverse side of the badge. The badges are silver or chrome plated steel for all ranks below sergeant, and gold plated for sergeant and above. A special 100th anniversary badge was worn for the centennial in 2022. This badge was gold with a silver center to represent both troopers and sergeants above.

Officers are issued a Glock 22, .40 S&W caliber semiautomatic pistol as sidearm. Previous issued sidearms include the 9mm Smith & Wesson Model 5904 pistol, the 9mm Smith & Wesson Model 439 pistol, & the 9mm Smith & Wesson Model 39 pistol. However, beginning in 2025, a transition back to the 9mm will take place. Notably, the ISP issued the Model 39 to their troopers in 1967, making the ISP the first American state police force to issue a semiautomatic pistol as a duty weapon to their officers.

=== Rank insignia ===
Rank	Insignia
Director	
First Deputy Director	
Colonel	
Lieutenant Colonel	
Major	
Captain	
Lieutenant	
Master Sergeant	
Sergeant	
Master Trooper	
Trooper First Class	
Trooper	

== See also ==
Illinois State Police:

- Illinois State Police Office (Pontiac)
- Firearm Owner's Identification
- Illinois v. Caballes

General:

- List of law enforcement agencies in Illinois
- State police
- Highway patrol

== Bibliography ==
- Clark, Harry F. (1972), Illinois State Police: A Division of the Department of Law Enforcement, 1922-1972, Springfield, Ill.: State Police Benevolent Group, ISBN 978-1-934729-22-9, OCLC 417833
- Illinois State Police (1997), Illinois State Police 75th, 1922-1997, Springfield, Ill.: Illinois State Police, ISBN 978-1-890105-00-6, OCLC 38965840
