= Illinois Law Enforcement Training and Standards Board =

Illinois state agency

Illinois Law Enforcement Training Standards Board
Agency overview
- Formed: 1965
- Jurisdiction: State of Illinois
- Headquarters: Springfield, Illinois
- Agency executive: Mitchell R. Davis III, Chairman
- Website: https://www.ptb.illinois.gov/

The Illinois Law Enforcement Training and Standards Board (LETSB), often called the Illinois Police Training Board, is a State of Illinois agency that oversees the independent police and law enforcement training academies that operate within Illinois for state and local law enforcement.

== Description ==
The 18-member Board, created by the Illinois Police Training Act, has operated since 1965. Twelve of the 18 board members are appointed by the Governor of Illinois from various specified expertise subsets, and six ex-officio board members are executives of statewide, Cook County, and Chicago law enforcement. The Board oversees the training of both police officers and correctional officers, thus covering most of the work done by sheriff's deputies in Illinois.

The LETSB was created during the year of the Watts riots of 1965, which marked the beginning of comprehensive political polarization within United States urban environments on issues of racial justice and law enforcement. This polarization, and LETSB's work and responsibility, continues as of 2022. As Illinois’ supervisory authority for police training, the Board is mandated by Illinois statutory law to impose programs of training and retraining to encourage law enforcement equity and diversity. Illinois criminal justice reform measures often impose additional mandates upon LETSB and the training programs that it guides or supervises.

== See also ==
- Minnesota Board of Peace Officer Standards and Training
