= List of House members of the 40th Parliament of Canada =

This is a list of members of the House of Commons of Canada in the 40th Canadian Parliament (November 18, 2008 to March 26, 2011).

== Members ==
Key:

- Party leaders are italicized.
- Cabinet ministers are in **boldface**.
- The prime minister is **both**.
- The speaker is indicated by "†".
- Parliamentary secretaries is indicated by "‡".

=== Alberta ===
Name	Party	Electoral district	First elected / previously elected	No. of terms
Lee Richardson	Conservative	Calgary Centre	1988, (Note: Calgary Southeast) 2004	4th term*
**Jim Prentice** (Until November 14, 2010)	Conservative	Calgary Centre-North	2004	3rd term
Vacant		Calgary Centre-North	2004	3rd term
Deepak Obhrai ‡	Conservative	Calgary East	1997	5th term
Devinder Shory	Conservative	Calgary Northeast	2008	1st term
**Diane Ablonczy**	Conservative	Calgary—Nose Hill	1993	6th term
**Jason Kenney**	Conservative	Calgary Southeast	1997	5th term
**Stephen Harper**	Conservative	Calgary Southwest	1993, (Note: Calgary West) 2002	5th term*
Rob Anders	Conservative	Calgary West	1997	5th term
Kevin Sorenson	Conservative	Crowfoot	2000	4th term
Laurie Hawn	Conservative	Edmonton Centre	2006	2nd term
Peter Goldring	Conservative	Edmonton East	1997	5th term
James Rajotte	Conservative	Edmonton—Leduc	2000	4th term
Mike Lake ‡	Conservative	Edmonton—Mill Woods—Beaumont	2006	2nd term
Linda Duncan	New Democratic	Edmonton—Strathcona	2008	1st term
Brent Rathgeber	Conservative	Edmonton—St. Albert	2008	1st term
Tim Uppal	Conservative	Edmonton—Sherwood Park	2008	1st term
**Rona Ambrose**	Conservative	Edmonton—Spruce Grove	2004	3rd term
Brian Jean ‡	Conservative	Fort McMurray—Athabasca	2004	3rd term
Rick Casson	Conservative	Lethbridge	1997	5th term
**Ted Menzies** ‡	Conservative	Macleod	2004	3rd term
LaVar Payne	Conservative	Medicine Hat	2008	1st term
Chris Warkentin	Conservative	Peace River	2006	2nd term
Earl Dreeshen	Conservative	Red Deer	2008	1st term
Leon Benoit	Conservative	Vegreville—Wainwright	1993	6th term
Brian Storseth	Conservative	Westlock—St. Paul	2006	2nd term
Blaine Calkins	Conservative	Wetaskiwin	2006	2nd term
Blake Richards	Conservative	Wild Rose	2008	1st term
**Rob Merrifield**	Conservative	Yellowhead	2000	4th term

=== British Columbia ===
Name	Party	Electoral district	First elected / previously elected	No. of terms
Ed Fast	Conservative	Abbotsford	2006	2nd term
Alex Atamanenko	New Democratic	British Columbia Southern Interior	2006	2nd term
Bill Siksay	New Democratic	Burnaby—Douglas	2004	3rd term
Peter Julian	New Democratic	Burnaby—New Westminster	2004	3rd term
Richard Harris	Conservative	Cariboo—Prince George	1993	6th term
**Chuck Strahl**	Conservative	Chilliwack—Fraser Canyon	1993	6th term
John Cummins	Conservative	Delta—Richmond East	1993	6th term
Keith Martin	Liberal	Esquimalt—Juan de Fuca	1993 (Note: First elected as a member of the Reform/Canadian Alliance party)	6th term
Nina Grewal	Conservative	Fleetwood—Port Kells	2004	3rd term
Cathy McLeod ‡	Conservative	Kamloops—Thompson—Cariboo	2008	1st term
Ron Cannan	Conservative	Kelowna—Lake Country	2006	2nd term
Jim Abbott ‡	Conservative	Kootenay—Columbia	1993	6th term
Mark Warawa ‡	Conservative	Langley	2004	3rd term
James Lunney	Conservative	Nanaimo—Alberni	2000	4th term
Jean Crowder	New Democratic	Nanaimo—Cowichan	2004	3rd term
Dawn Black (Until April 13, 2009)	New Democratic	New Westminster—Coquitlam	1988, 2006	3rd term*
Fin Donnelly (From November 9, 2009)	New Democratic	New Westminster—Coquitlam	2009	1st term
Sukh Dhaliwal	Liberal	Newton—North Delta	2006	2nd term
Andrew Saxton ‡	Conservative	North Vancouver	2008	1st term
**Stockwell Day**	Conservative	Okanagan—Coquihalla	2000	5th term
Colin Mayes	Conservative	Okanagan—Shuswap	2006	2nd term
Randy Kamp ‡	Conservative	Pitt Meadows—Maple Ridge—Mission	2004	3rd term
**James Moore**	Conservative	Port Moody—Westwood—Port Coquitlam	2000	4th term
**Jay Hill** (Until October 25, 2010)	Conservative	Prince George—Peace River	1993	6th term
Vacant		Prince George—Peace River	1993	6th term
Alice Wong ‡	Conservative	Richmond	2008	1st term
**Gary Lunn**	Conservative	Saanich—Gulf Islands	1997	5th term
Russ Hiebert	Conservative	South Surrey—White Rock—Cloverdale	2004	3rd term
Nathan Cullen	New Democratic	Skeena—Bulkley Valley	2004	3rd term
Dona Cadman	Conservative	Surrey North	2008	1st term
Hedy Fry	Liberal	Vancouver Centre	1993	6th term
Libby Davies	New Democratic	Vancouver East	1997	5th term
**John Duncan** ‡	Conservative	Vancouver Island North	1993, 2008	5th term*
Don Davies	New Democratic	Vancouver Kingsway	2008	1st term
Joyce Murray	Liberal	Vancouver Quadra	2008	2nd term
Ujjal Dosanjh	Liberal	Vancouver South	2004	3rd term
Denise Savoie	New Democratic	Victoria	2006	2nd term
John Weston	Conservative	West Vancouver—Sunshine Coast—Sea to Sky Country	2008	1st term

=== Manitoba ===
Name	Party	Electoral district	First elected / previously elected	No. of terms
Merv Tweed	Conservative	Brandon—Souris	2004	3rd term
**Steven Fletcher**	Conservative	Charleswood—St. James—Assiniboia	2004	3rd term
Niki Ashton	New Democratic	Churchill	2008	1st term
Inky Mark (Until September 15, 2010)	Conservative	Dauphin—Swan River—Marquette	1997	5th term
Robert Sopuck (From November 29, 2010)	Conservative	Dauphin—Swan River—Marquette	2010	1st term
Jim Maloway	New Democratic	Elmwood—Transcona	2008	1st term
Joy Smith	Conservative	Kildonan—St. Paul	2004	3rd term
Candice Hoeppner	Conservative	Portage—Lisgar	2008	1st term
**Vic Toews**	Conservative	Provencher	2000	4th term
Shelly Glover ‡	Conservative	Saint Boniface	2008	1st term
James Bezan	Conservative	Selkirk—Interlake	2004	3rd term
Pat Martin	New Democratic	Winnipeg Centre	1997	5th term
Judy Wasylycia-Leis (Until April 30, 2010)	New Democratic	Winnipeg North	1997	5th term
Kevin Lamoureux (From November 29, 2010)	Liberal	Winnipeg North	2010	1st term
Rod Bruinooge	Conservative	Winnipeg South	2006	2nd term
Anita Neville	Liberal	Winnipeg South Centre	2000	4th term

=== New Brunswick ===
Name	Party	Electoral district	First elected / previously elected	No. of terms
Yvon Godin	New Democratic	Acadie—Bathurst	1997	5th term
Dominic LeBlanc	Liberal	Beauséjour	2000	4th term
**Keith Ashfield**	Conservative	Fredericton	2008	1st term
**Rob Moore** ‡	Conservative	Fundy Royal	2004	3rd term
Jean-Claude D'Amours	Liberal	Madawaska—Restigouche	2004	3rd term
Tilly O'Neill-Gordon	Conservative	Miramichi	2008	1st term
Brian Murphy	Liberal	Moncton—Riverview—Dieppe	2006	2nd term
**Greg Thompson**	Conservative	New Brunswick Southwest	1988, 1997	6th term*
Rodney Weston	Conservative	Saint John	2008	1st term
Mike Allen	Conservative	Tobique—Mactaquac	2006	2nd term

=== Newfoundland and Labrador ===
Name	Party	Electoral district	First elected / previously elected	No. of terms
Scott Andrews	Liberal	Avalon	2008	1st term
Scott Simms	Liberal	Bonavista—Gander—Grand Falls—Windsor	2004	3rd term
Gerry Byrne	Liberal	Humber—St. Barbe—Baie Verte	1996	6th term
Todd Russell	Liberal	Labrador	2005	3rd term
Judy Foote	Liberal	Random—Burin—St. George's	2008	1st term
Jack Harris	New Democratic	St. John's East	1987, 2008	2nd term*
Siobhán Coady	Liberal	St. John's South—Mount Pearl	2008	1st term

=== Nova Scotia ===
Name	Party	Electoral district	First elected / previously elected	No. of terms
Rodger Cuzner	Liberal	Cape Breton—Canso	2000	4th term
**Peter MacKay**	Conservative	Central Nova	1997	5th term
Bill Casey (Until April 30, 2009)	Independent	Cumberland—Colchester—Musquodoboit Valley	1988, (Note: First elected as a Progressive Conservative) 1997 (Note: re-elected as a Progressive Conservative)	6th term*
Scott Armstrong (From November 9, 2009)	Conservative	Cumberland—Colchester—Musquodoboit Valley	2009	1st term
Michael Savage	Liberal	Dartmouth—Cole Harbour	2004	3rd term
Megan Leslie	New Democratic	Halifax	2008	1st term
Geoff Regan	Liberal	Halifax West	1993, 2000	5th term*
Scott Brison	Liberal	Kings—Hants	1997, 2000	5th term*
Peter Stoffer	New Democratic	Sackville—Eastern Shore	1997	5th term
Gerald Keddy ‡	Conservative	South Shore—St. Margaret's	1997	5th term
Mark Eyking	Liberal	Sydney—Victoria	2000	4th term
Greg Kerr ‡	Conservative	West Nova	2008	1st term

=== Ontario ===
Name	Party	Electoral district	First elected / previously elected	No. of terms
Mark Holland	Liberal	Ajax—Pickering	2004	3rd term
Carol Hughes	New Democratic	Algoma—Manitoulin—Kapuskasing	2008	1st term
David Sweet	Conservative	Ancaster—Dundas—Flamborough—Westdale	2006	2nd term
Patrick Brown	Conservative	Barrie	2006	2nd term
Maria Minna	Liberal	Beaches—East York	1993	6th term
Gurbax Malhi	Liberal	Bramalea—Gore—Malton	1993	6th term
Ruby Dhalla	Liberal	Brampton—Springdale	2004	3rd term
Andrew Kania	Liberal	Brampton West	2008	1st term
Phil McColeman	Conservative	Brant	2008	1st term
Larry Miller	Conservative	Bruce—Grey—Owen Sound	2004	3rd term
Mike Wallace	Conservative	Burlington	2006	2nd term
**Gary Goodyear**	Conservative	Cambridge	2004	3rd term
**Gordon O'Connor**	Conservative	Carleton—Mississippi Mills	2004	3rd term
Dave Van Kesteren	Conservative	Chatham-Kent—Essex	2006	2nd term
Mario Silva	Liberal	Davenport	2004	3rd term
Yasmin Ratansi	Liberal	Don Valley East	2004	3rd term
Rob Oliphant	Liberal	Don Valley West	2008	1st term
David Tilson	Conservative	Dufferin—Caledon	2004	3rd term
**Bev Oda**	Conservative	Durham	2004	3rd term
Joe Volpe	Liberal	Eglinton—Lawrence	1988	7th term
Joe Preston	Conservative	Elgin—Middlesex—London	2004	3rd term
Jeff Watson	Conservative	Essex	2004	3rd term
Borys Wrzesnewskyj	Liberal	Etobicoke Centre	2004	3rd term
Michael Ignatieff	Liberal	Etobicoke—Lakeshore	2006	2nd term
Kirsty Duncan	Liberal	Etobicoke North	2008	1st term
Pierre Lemieux ‡	Conservative	Glengarry—Prescott—Russell	2006	2nd term
Frank Valeriote	Liberal	Guelph	2008	1st term
**Diane Finley**	Conservative	Haldimand—Norfolk	2004	3rd term
Barry Devolin	Conservative	Haliburton—Kawartha Lakes—Brock	2004	3rd term
**Lisa Raitt**	Conservative	Halton	2008	1st term
David Christopherson	New Democratic	Hamilton Centre	2004	3rd term
Wayne Marston	New Democratic	Hamilton East—Stoney Creek	2006	2nd term
Chris Charlton	New Democratic	Hamilton Mountain	2006	2nd term
Ben Lobb	Conservative	Huron—Bruce	2008	1st term
Greg Rickford ‡	Conservative	Kenora	2008	1st term
Peter Milliken †	Liberal	Kingston and the Islands	1988	7th term
Stephen Woodworth	Conservative	Kitchener Centre	2008	1st term
Harold Albrecht	Conservative	Kitchener—Conestoga	2006	2nd term
Peter Braid	Conservative	Kitchener—Waterloo	2008	1st term
Bev Shipley	Conservative	Lambton—Kent—Middlesex	2006	2nd term
Scott Reid	Conservative	Lanark—Frontenac—Lennox and Addington	2000	4th term
Gord Brown	Conservative	Leeds—Grenville	2004	3rd term
Irene Mathyssen	New Democratic	London—Fanshawe	2006	2nd term
Glen Pearson	Liberal	London North Centre	2006	2nd term
Ed Holder	Conservative	London West	2008	1st term
John McCallum	Liberal	Markham—Unionville	2000	4th term
Navdeep Bains	Liberal	Mississauga—Brampton South	2004	3rd term
Albina Guarnieri	Liberal	Mississauga East—Cooksville	1988	7th term
Bob Dechert ‡	Conservative	Mississauga—Erindale	2008	1st term
Paul Szabo	Liberal	Mississauga South	1993	6th term
Bonnie Crombie	Liberal	Mississauga—Streetsville	2008	1st term
Pierre Poilievre ‡	Conservative	Nepean—Carleton	2004	3rd term
Lois Brown ‡	Conservative	Newmarket—Aurora	2008	1st term
**Rob Nicholson**	Conservative	Niagara Falls	1984, 2004	5th term*
Dean Allison	Conservative	Niagara West—Glanbrook	2004	3rd term
Claude Gravelle	New Democratic	Nickel Belt	2008	1st term
Anthony Rota	Liberal	Nipissing—Timiskaming	2004	3rd term
Rick Norlock	Conservative	Northumberland—Quinte West	2006	2nd term
Terence Young	Conservative	Oakville	2008	1st term
Paul Calandra	Conservative	Oak Ridges—Markham	2008	1st term
Colin Carrie ‡	Conservative	Oshawa	2004	3rd term
Paul Dewar	New Democratic	Ottawa Centre	2006	2nd term
Royal Galipeau	Conservative	Ottawa—Orléans	2006	2nd term
David McGuinty	Liberal	Ottawa South	2004	3rd term
Mauril Bélanger	Liberal	Ottawa—Vanier	1995	6th term
**John Baird**	Conservative	Ottawa West—Nepean	2006	2nd term
Dave MacKenzie ‡	Conservative	Oxford	2004	3rd term
Gerard Kennedy	Liberal	Parkdale—High Park	2008	1st term
**Tony Clement**	Conservative	Parry Sound-Muskoka	2006	2nd term
Gary Schellenberger	Conservative	Perth Wellington	2003	4th term
Dean Del Mastro ‡	Conservative	Peterborough	2006	2nd term
Dan McTeague	Liberal	Pickering—Scarborough East	1993	6th term
Daryl Kramp	Conservative	Prince Edward—Hastings	2004	3rd term
Cheryl Gallant	Conservative	Renfrew—Nipissing—Pembroke	2000	4th term
Bryon Wilfert	Liberal	Richmond Hill	1997	5th term
Pat Davidson	Conservative	Sarnia—Lambton	2006	2nd term
Tony Martin	New Democratic	Sault Ste. Marie	2004	3rd term
Jim Karygiannis	Liberal	Scarborough—Agincourt	1988	7th term
John Cannis	Liberal	Scarborough Centre	1993	6th term
John McKay	Liberal	Scarborough—Guildwood	1997	5th term
Michelle Simson	Liberal	Scarborough Southwest	2008	1st term
Derek Lee	Liberal	Scarborough—Rouge River	1988	7th term
**Helena Guergis**	Conservative	Simcoe—Grey	2004	3rd term
**Helena Guergis**	Independent	Simcoe—Grey	2004	3rd term
Bruce Stanton	Conservative	Simcoe North	2006	2nd term
Rick Dykstra ‡	Conservative	St. Catharines	2006	2nd term
Carolyn Bennett	Liberal	St. Paul's	1997	5th term
Guy Lauzon	Conservative	Stormont—Dundas—South Glengarry	2004	3rd term
Glenn Thibeault	New Democratic	Sudbury	2008	1st term
**Peter Kent**	Conservative	Thornhill	2008	1st term
John Rafferty	New Democratic	Thunder Bay—Rainy River	2008	1st term
Bruce Hyer	New Democratic	Thunder Bay—Superior North	2008	1st term
Charlie Angus	New Democratic	Timmins-James Bay	2004	3rd term
Bob Rae	Liberal	Toronto Centre	1978, (Note: Broadview/Broadview—Greenwood (First elected as a New Democrat)) 2008	4th term*
Jack Layton	New Democratic	Toronto—Danforth	2004	3rd term
Olivia Chow	New Democratic	Trinity—Spadina	2006	2nd term
Maurizio Bevilacqua (Until September 2, 2010)	Liberal	Vaughan	1988	7th term
**Julian Fantino** (From November 29, 2010)	Conservative	Vaughan	2010	1st term
Malcolm Allen	New Democratic	Welland	2008	1st term
Michael Chong	Conservative	Wellington—Halton Hills	2004	3rd term
**Jim Flaherty**	Conservative	Whitby—Oshawa	2006	2nd term
Martha Hall Findlay	Liberal	Willowdale	2008	2nd term
Joe Comartin	New Democratic	Windsor—Tecumseh	2000	4th term
Brian Masse	New Democratic	Windsor West	2002	4th term
Ken Dryden	Liberal	York Centre	2004	3rd term
**Peter Van Loan**	Conservative	York—Simcoe	2004	3rd term
Alan Tonks	Liberal	York South—Weston	2000	4th term
Judy Sgro	Liberal	York West	1999	5th term

=== Prince Edward Island ===
Name	Party	Electoral district	First elected / previously elected	No. of terms
Lawrence MacAulay	Liberal	Cardigan	1988	7th term
Shawn Murphy	Liberal	Charlottetown	2000	4th term
**Gail Shea**	Conservative	Egmont	2008	1st term
Wayne Easter	Liberal	Malpeque	1993	6th term

=== Quebec ===
Name	Party	Electoral district	First elected / previously elected	No. of terms
Yvon Lévesque	Bloc Québécois	Abitibi—Baie-James—Nunavik—Eeyou	2004	3rd term
Marc Lemay	Bloc Québécois	Abitibi—Témiscamingue	2004	3rd term
Maria Mourani	Bloc Québécois	Ahuntsic	2006	2nd term
Robert Carrier	Bloc Québécois	Alfred-Pellan	2004	3rd term
Mario Laframboise	Bloc Québécois	Argenteuil—Papineau—Mirabel	2000	4th term
Louis Plamondon	Bloc Québécois	Bas-Richelieu—Nicolet—Bécancour	1984	8th term
Maxime Bernier	Conservative	Beauce	2006	2nd term
Claude DeBellefeuille	Bloc Québécois	Beauharnois—Salaberry	2006	2nd term
Sylvie Boucher ‡	Conservative	Beauport—Limoilou	2006	2nd term
Guy André	Bloc Québécois	Berthier—Maskinongé	2004	3rd term
Denis Coderre	Liberal	Bourassa	1997	5th term
Christian Ouellet	Bloc Québécois	Brome—Missisquoi	2006	2nd term
Alexandra Mendès	Liberal	Brossard—La Prairie	2008	1st term
Yves Lessard	Bloc Québécois	Chambly—Borduas	2004	3rd term
Daniel Petit	Conservative	Charlesbourg—Haute-Saint-Charles	2006	2nd term
Carole Freeman	Bloc Québécois	Châteauguay—Saint-Constant	2006	2nd term
Robert Bouchard	Bloc Québécois	Chicoutimi—Le Fjord	2004	3rd term
France Bonsant	Bloc Québécois	Compton—Stanstead	2004	3rd term
Roger Pomerleau	Bloc Québécois	Drummond	1993, (Note: Anjou—Rivière-des-Prairies) 2008	2nd term*
Raynald Blais	Bloc Québécois	Gaspésie—Îles-de-la-Madeleine	2004	3rd term
Richard Nadeau	Bloc Québécois	Gatineau	2006	2nd term
Jean-Yves Roy (Until October 22, 2010)	Bloc Québécois	Haute-Gaspésie—La Mitis—Matane—Matapédia	2000	4th term
Vacant		Haute-Gaspésie—La Mitis—Matane—Matapédia	2000	4th term
Réal Ménard (Until September 16, 2009)	Bloc Québécois	Hochelaga	1993	6th term
Daniel Paillé (From November 9, 2009)	Bloc Québécois	Hochelaga	2009	1st term
Pablo Rodriguez	Liberal	Honoré-Mercier	2004	3rd term
Marcel Proulx	Liberal	Hull—Aylmer	1999	5th term
Thierry St-Cyr	Bloc Québécois	Jeanne-Le Ber	2006	2nd term
Pierre Paquette	Bloc Québécois	Joliette	2000	4th term
**Jean-Pierre Blackburn**	Conservative	Jonquière—Alma	1984, 2006	4th term*
Francine Lalonde	Bloc Québécois	La Pointe-de-l'Île	1993	6th term
Francis Scarpaleggia	Liberal	Lac-Saint-Louis	2004	3rd term
Lise Zarac	Liberal	LaSalle—Émard	2008	1st term
Johanne Deschamps	Bloc Québécois	Laurentides—Labelle	2004	3rd term
Gilles Duceppe	Bloc Québécois	Laurier—Sainte-Marie	1990	7th term
Nicole Demers	Bloc Québécois	Laval	2004	3rd term
Raymonde Folco	Liberal	Laval—Les Îles	1997	5th term
Steven Blaney	Conservative	Lévis—Bellechasse	2006	2nd term
Jean Dorion	Bloc Québécois	Longueuil—Pierre-Boucher	2008	1st term
Jacques Gourde ‡	Conservative	Lotbinière—Chutes-de-la-Chaudière	2006	2nd term
Pascal-Pierre Paillé	Bloc Québécois	Louis-Hébert	2008	1st term
**Josée Verner**	Conservative	Louis-Saint-Laurent	2006	2nd term
Gérard Asselin	Bloc Québécois	Manicouagan	1993	6th term
Serge Ménard	Bloc Québécois	Marc-Aurèle-Fortin	2004	3rd term
**Christian Paradis**	Conservative	Mégantic—L'Érable	2006	2nd term
Roger Gaudet	Bloc Québécois	Montcalm	2002	4th term
Paul Crête (Until May 21, 2009)	Bloc Québécois	Montmagny—L'Islet—Kamouraska—Rivière-du-Loup	1993	6th term
Bernard Généreux (From November 9, 2009)	Conservative	Montmagny—L'Islet—Kamouraska—Rivière-du-Loup	2009	1st term
Michel Guimond	Bloc Québécois	Montmorency—Charlevoix—Haute-Côte-Nord	1993	6th term
Irwin Cotler	Liberal	Mount Royal	1999	5th term
Marlene Jennings	Liberal	Notre-Dame-de-Grâce—Lachine	1997	5th term
Thomas Mulcair	New Democratic	Outremont	2007	2nd term
Justin Trudeau	Liberal	Papineau	2008	1st term
Bernard Patry	Liberal	Pierrefonds—Dollard	1993	6th term
**Lawrence Cannon**	Conservative	Pontiac	2006	2nd term
André Arthur	Independent	Portneuf—Jacques-Cartier	2006	2nd term
Christiane Gagnon	Bloc Québécois	Québec	1993	6th term
Nicolas Dufour	Bloc Québécois	Repentigny	2008	1st term
André Bellavance	Bloc Québécois	Richmond—Arthabaska	2004	3rd term
Claude Guimond	Bloc Québécois	Rimouski-Neigette—Témiscouata—Les Basques	2008	1st term
Luc Desnoyers	Bloc Québécois	Rivière-des-Mille-Îles	2008	1st term
Monique Guay	Bloc Québécois	Rivière-du-Nord	1993	6th term
**Denis Lebel**	Conservative	Roberval—Lac-Saint-Jean	2007	2nd term
Bernard Bigras	Bloc Québécois	Rosemont—La Petite-Patrie	1997	5th term
Carole Lavallée	Bloc Québécois	Saint-Bruno—Saint-Hubert	2004	3rd term
Ève-Mary Thaï Thi Lac	Bloc Québécois	Saint-Hyacinthe—Bagot	2007	2nd term
Claude Bachand	Bloc Québécois	Saint-Jean	1993	6th term
Josée Beaudin	Bloc Québécois	Saint-Lambert	2008	1st term
Stéphane Dion	Liberal	Saint-Laurent—Cartierville	1996	6th term
Massimo Pacetti	Liberal	Saint-Léonard—Saint-Michel	2002	4th term
Jean-Yves Laforest	Bloc Québécois	Saint-Maurice—Champlain	2006	2nd term
Robert Vincent	Bloc Québécois	Shefford	2004	3rd term
Serge Cardin	Bloc Québécois	Sherbrooke	1998	5th term
Diane Bourgeois	Bloc Québécois	Terrebonne—Blainville	2000	4th term
Paule Brunelle	Bloc Québécois	Trois-Rivières	2004	3rd term
Meili Faille	Bloc Québécois	Vaudreuil—Soulanges	2004	3rd term
Luc Malo	Bloc Québécois	Verchères—Les Patriotes	2006	2nd term
Marc Garneau	Liberal	Westmount—Ville-Marie	2008	1st term

=== Saskatchewan ===
Name	Party	Electoral district	First elected / previously elected	No. of terms
**Gerry Ritz**	Conservative	Battlefords—Lloydminster	1997	5th term
**Lynne Yelich**	Conservative	Blackstrap	2000	4th term
David L. Anderson ‡	Conservative	Cypress Hills—Grasslands	2000	4th term
Rob Clarke	Conservative	Desnethé—Missinippi—Churchill River	2008	2nd term
Ray Boughen	Conservative	Palliser	2008	1st term
Randy Hoback	Conservative	Prince Albert	2008	1st term
Tom Lukiwski ‡	Conservative	Regina—Lumsden—Lake Centre	2004	3rd term
Andrew Scheer	Conservative	Regina—Qu'Appelle	2004	3rd term
Brad Trost	Conservative	Saskatoon—Humboldt	2004	3rd term
Kelly Block	Conservative	Saskatoon—Rosetown—Biggar	2008	1st term
Maurice Vellacott	Conservative	Saskatoon—Wanuskewin	1997	5th term
Ed Komarnicki ‡	Conservative	Souris—Moose Mountain	2004	3rd term
Ralph Goodale	Liberal	Wascana	1974, (Note: Assiniboia) 1993	7th term*
Garry Breitkreuz	Conservative	Yorkton—Melville	1993	6th term

=== Territories ===
Name	Party	Electoral district	First elected / previously elected	No. of terms
**Leona Aglukkaq**	Conservative	Nunavut	2008	1st term
Dennis Bevington	New Democratic	Western Arctic	2006	2nd term
Larry Bagnell	Liberal	Yukon	2000	4th term

== Changes since the 40th election ==
The party standings have changed as follows:

Number of members per party by date	2008	2009					2010							
Number of members per party by date	Oct 14	Apr 13	Apr 30	May 21	Sep 16	Nov 9	Apr 9	Apr 30	Sep 2	Sep 15	Oct 22	Oct 25	Nov 14	Nov 29
Conservative	143					145	144			143		142	141	143
Liberal	77								76					77
Bloc Québécois	49			48	47	48					47			
New Democratic	37	36				37		36						
Independent	2		1											
Independent Conservative	0						1							
Total members	308	307	306	305	304	308		307	306	305	304	303	302	305
Vacant	0	1	2	3	4	0		1	2	3	4	5	6	3
Government majority	-22	-21	-20	-19	-18		-20	-19	-18	-19	-18	-19	-20	-19

=== Membership changes ===
Membership changes in the 40th Parliament
Date	Name	District	Party	Reason
October 14, 2008	See List of Members			Election day of the 40th federal election
April 13, 2009	Dawn Black	New Westminster—Coquitlam	New Democratic	Resigned to run in the 2009 B.C. election
April 30, 2009	Bill Casey	Cumberland—Colchester—Musquodoboit Valley	Independent	Resigned to work as Nova Scotias' senior representative in Ottawa.
May 21, 2009	Paul Crête	Montmagny—L'Islet—Kamouraska—Rivière-du-Loup	Bloc Québécois	Resigned to run in provincial Rivière-du-Loup by-election.
September 16, 2009	Réal Ménard	Hochelaga	Bloc Québécois	Resigned to run in Montreal municipal election.
November 9, 2009	Scott Armstrong	Cumberland—Colchester—Musquodoboit Valley	Conservative	Elected in a by-election
November 9, 2009	Fin Donnelly	New Westminster—Coquitlam	New Democratic	Elected in a by-election
November 9, 2009	Bernard Généreux	Montmagny—L'Islet—Kamouraska—Rivière-du-Loup	Conservative	Elected in a by-election
November 9, 2009	Daniel Paillé	Hochelaga	Bloc Québécois	Elected in a by-election
April 9, 2010	Helena Guergis	Simcoe—Grey	Independent Conservative	Removed from the Conservative caucus
April 30, 2010	Judy Wasylycia-Leis	Winnipeg North	New Democratic	Resigned to run for mayor of Winnipeg.
September 2, 2010	Maurizio Bevilacqua	Vaughan	Liberal	Resigned to run for mayor of Vaughan, Ontario.
September 15, 2010	Inky Mark	Dauphin—Swan River—Marquette	Conservative	Resigned to run for mayor of Dauphin, Manitoba.
October 22, 2010	Jean-Yves Roy	Haute-Gaspésie—La Mitis—Matane—Matapédia	Bloc Québécois	Resigned due to health issues
October 25, 2010	Jay Hill	Prince George—Peace River	Conservative	Resigned seat
November 14, 2010	Jim Prentice	Calgary Centre-North	Conservative	Resigned seat to become vice-chairman of CIBC
November 29, 2010	Julian Fantino	Vaughan	Conservative	Elected in a by-election
November 29, 2010	Kevin Lamoureux	Winnipeg North	Liberal	Elected in a by-election
November 29, 2010	Robert Sopuck	Dauphin—Swan River—Marquette	Conservative	Elected in a by-election

== See also ==
- List of senators in the 40th Parliament of Canada
- Women in the 40th Canadian Parliament
