= 40th Canadian Parliament =

2008–2011 term of the Canadian federal legislative body

- Minority parliament
- Nov. 18, 2008 – Mar. 26, 2011
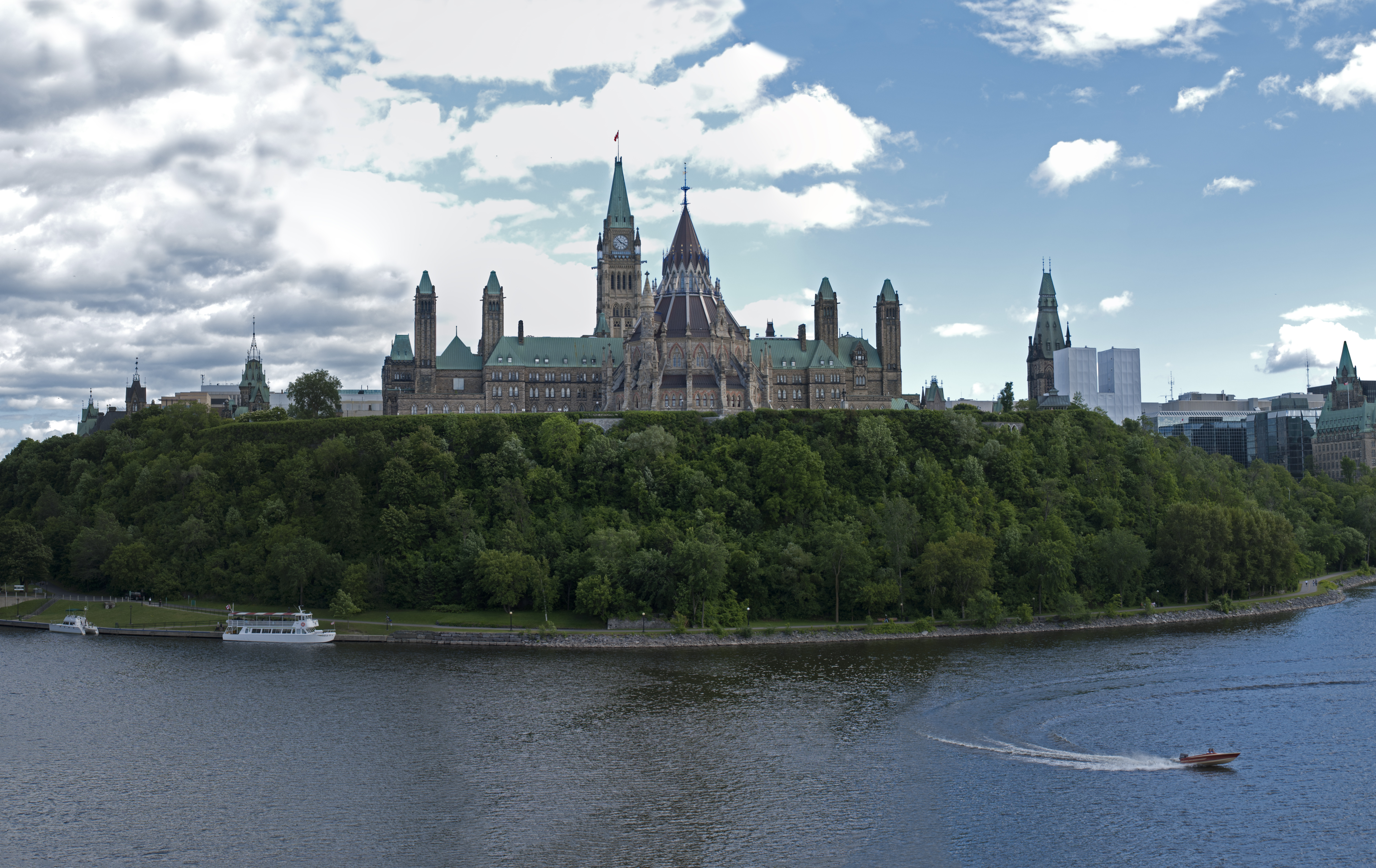
- Canadian Parliament (2010)

Parliament leaders
- Prime minister: Rt. Hon. Stephen Harper; Feb. 6, 2006 – Nov. 4, 2015
- Cabinet: 28th Canadian Ministry
- Leader of the Opposition: Hon. Stéphane Dion; December 2, 2006 – December 10, 2008
- Hon. Michael Ignatieff; December 10, 2008 – May 2, 2011

Party caucuses
- Government: Conservative Party
- Opposition: Liberal Party
- Recognized: Bloc Québécois
- New Democratic Party
- Unrecognized: Progressive Conservative*
- * Only in the Senate.

House of Commons
- Seating arrangements of the House of Commons
- Speaker of the Commons: Hon. Peter Milliken; January 29, 2001 – June 2, 2011
- Government House leader: Hon. Jay Hill; October 3, 2008 – August 6, 2010
- Hon. John Baird; August 6, 2010 – May 2, 2011
- Opposition House leader: Hon. Ralph Goodale; February 10, 2006 – September 10, 2010
- David McGuinty; September 10, 2010 – May 26, 2011
- Members: 308 seats MP seats List of members

Senate
- Seating arrangements of the Senate
- Speaker of the Senate: Hon. Noël A. Kinsella; February 8, 2006 – November 26, 2014
- Government Senate leader: Hon. Marjory LeBreton; February 6, 2006 - July 14, 2013
- Opposition Senate leader: Hon. Jim Cowan; November 3, 2008 – November 5, 2015
- Senators: 105 seats senator seats List of senators

Sovereign
- Monarch: HM Elizabeth II; February 6, 1952 – 8 September 2022
- Governor general: HE Rt. Hon. Michaëlle Jean; September 27, 2005 – October 1, 2010
- HE Rt. Hon. David Johnston; October 1, 2010 – October 2, 2017

Sessions
- 1st session November 18, 2008 – December 4, 2008
- 2nd session January 26, 2009 – December 30, 2009
- 3rd session March 3, 2010 – March 26, 2011
| ← 39th | → 41st |

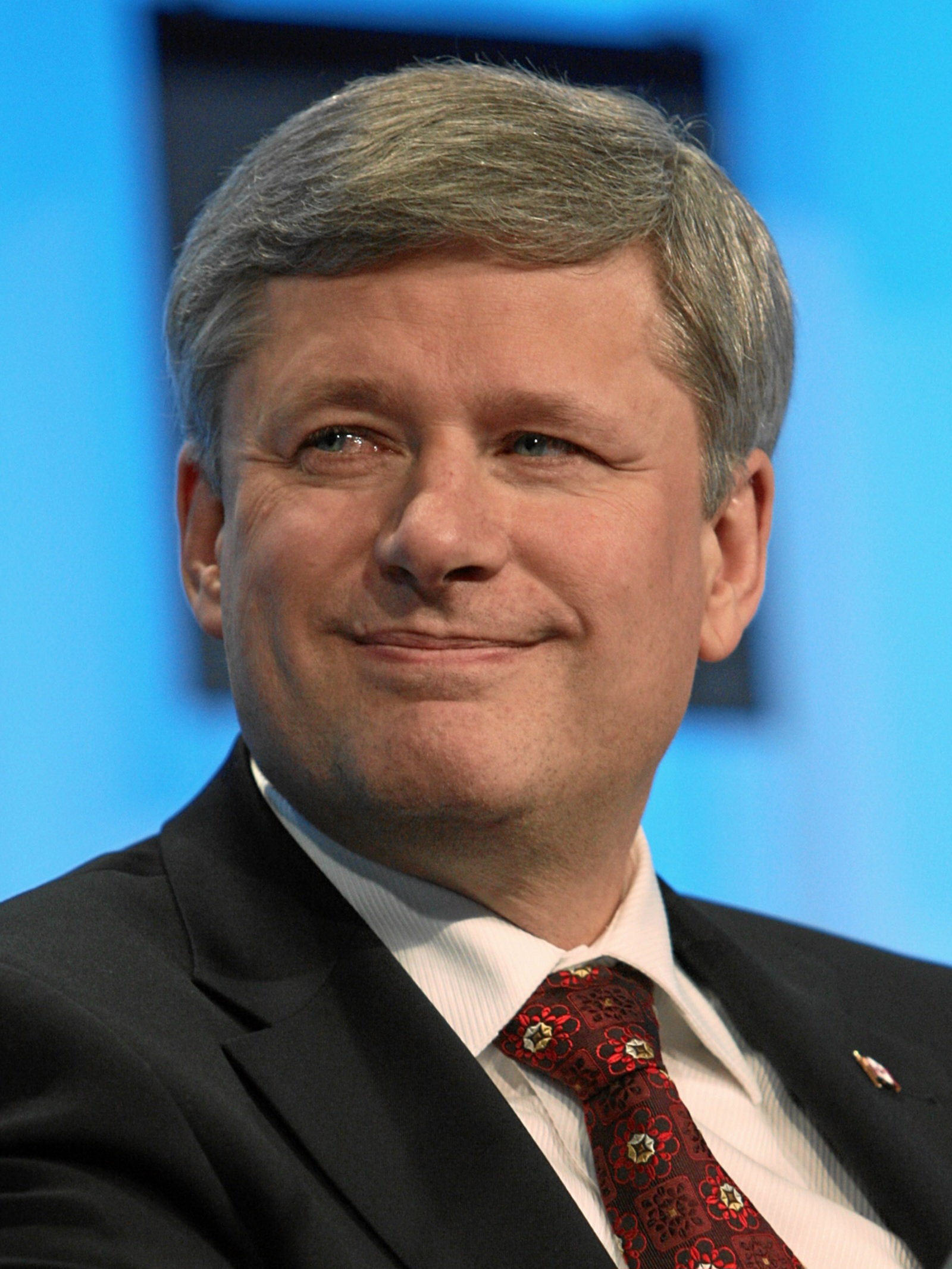
Stephen Harper was Prime Minister during the 40th Canadian Parliament.

The 40th Canadian Parliament was in session from November 18, 2008 to March 26, 2011. It was the last Parliament of the longest-running minority government in Canadian history up to that point, that began with the previous Parliament. The membership of its House of Commons was determined by the results of the 2008 federal election held on October 14, 2008. It was dissolved prior to the 2011 federal election.

There were three sessions of the 40th Parliament:

| Session | Start | End |
|---|---|---|
| 1st | November 18, 2008 | December 4, 2008 |
| 2nd | January 26, 2009 | December 30, 2009 |
| 3rd | March 3, 2010 | March 26, 2011 |

== Overview ==
Its first session was then prorogued by the Governor General on December 4, 2008, at the request of Prime Minister Stephen Harper, who was facing a likely no-confidence motion and a coalition agreement between the Liberal party and the New Democratic Party with the support of the Bloc Québécois (2008–2009 Canadian parliamentary dispute). Of the 308 MPs elected at the October 14, 2008 general election, 64 were new to Parliament and three sat in Parliaments previous to the 39th: John Duncan, Jack Harris and Roger Pomerleau.

On March 25, 2011, the House of Commons passed a Liberal motion of non-confidence by a vote of 156 to 145, finding the Conservative Cabinet in contempt of parliament, an unprecedented finding in Canadian and Commonwealth parliamentary history. On March 26, 2011, Prime Minister Stephen Harper subsequently asked Governor General David Johnston to dissolve parliament and issue a writ of election.

== Party standings ==
The party standings as of the election, and at dissolution, were as follows:

Standings in the 40th Canadian Parliament
| Affiliation | House members | | Senate members | |
| Affiliation | 2008 election results | At dissolution | On election day 2008 | At dissolution |
|---|---|---|---|---|
| Conservative | 143 | 143 | 21 | 52 |
| Liberal | 77 | 77 | 58 | 46 |
| Bloc Québécois | 49 | 47 | 0 | 0 |
| New Democratic | 37 | 36 | 0 | 0 |
| Independent | 2 | 1 | 5 | 2 |
| Senate PC | 0 | 0 | 3 | 2 |
| Independent Conservative | 0 | 1 | 0 | 0 |
| Independent Liberal | 0 | 0 | 1 | 0 |
| Independent New Democrat | 0 | 0 | 1 | 0 |
| Total members | 308 | 305 | 89 | 102 |
| Vacant | 0 | 3 | 16 | 3 |
| Total seats | 308 | | 105 | |

== Major events ==
=== 1st session and prorogation ===
The first session of the 40th parliament opened on November 18, 2008, after Prime Minister Stephen Harper and the Conservatives won a slightly stronger minority government in the 2008 election. With a new government in session, Finance Minister Jim Flaherty tabled a fiscal update nine days later. Among other things, the update cut government spending, suspended the ability of civil servants to strike, sold off some Crown assets, and eliminated existing political party subsidies. This fiscal update was rejected by the opposition, and became a catalyst for talks of a coalition government. Stéphane Dion of the Liberal Party and Jack Layton of the New Democratic Party, signed an accord stating that in the event that the government lost the confidence of the house, they would form a coalition with the support of Gilles Duceppe and the Bloc Québécois, if asked to do so by the Governor General of Canada Michaëlle Jean. However, Stephen Harper delayed the vote of non-confidence scheduled for December 1, and the Governor General prorogued parliament on Harper's advice on December 4, 2008, until January 26, 2009.

After prorogation, calls came from within the Liberal Party for Dion to resign immediately. Dion initially scheduled his resignation for the party's leadership convention in May 2009, but on December 8, 2008, he announced that he would step down upon the selection of an interim leader. After the withdrawal of Bob Rae and Dominic LeBlanc from the 2009 leadership race, Michael Ignatieff became the only leadership candidate, and therefore was appointed interim leader of the Liberals and the opposition on December 10, 2008.

=== 2nd session and prorogation ===
The Governor-in-Council recalled parliament on January 26, 2009. Its first business (after the Throne Speech) was to present the federal budget, which included a large deficit. After negotiations with new opposition leader Michael Ignatieff, the government promised to present regular updates on the stimulus budget, and the Liberals and Conservatives joined to pass the budget and keep the Conservative government in power.

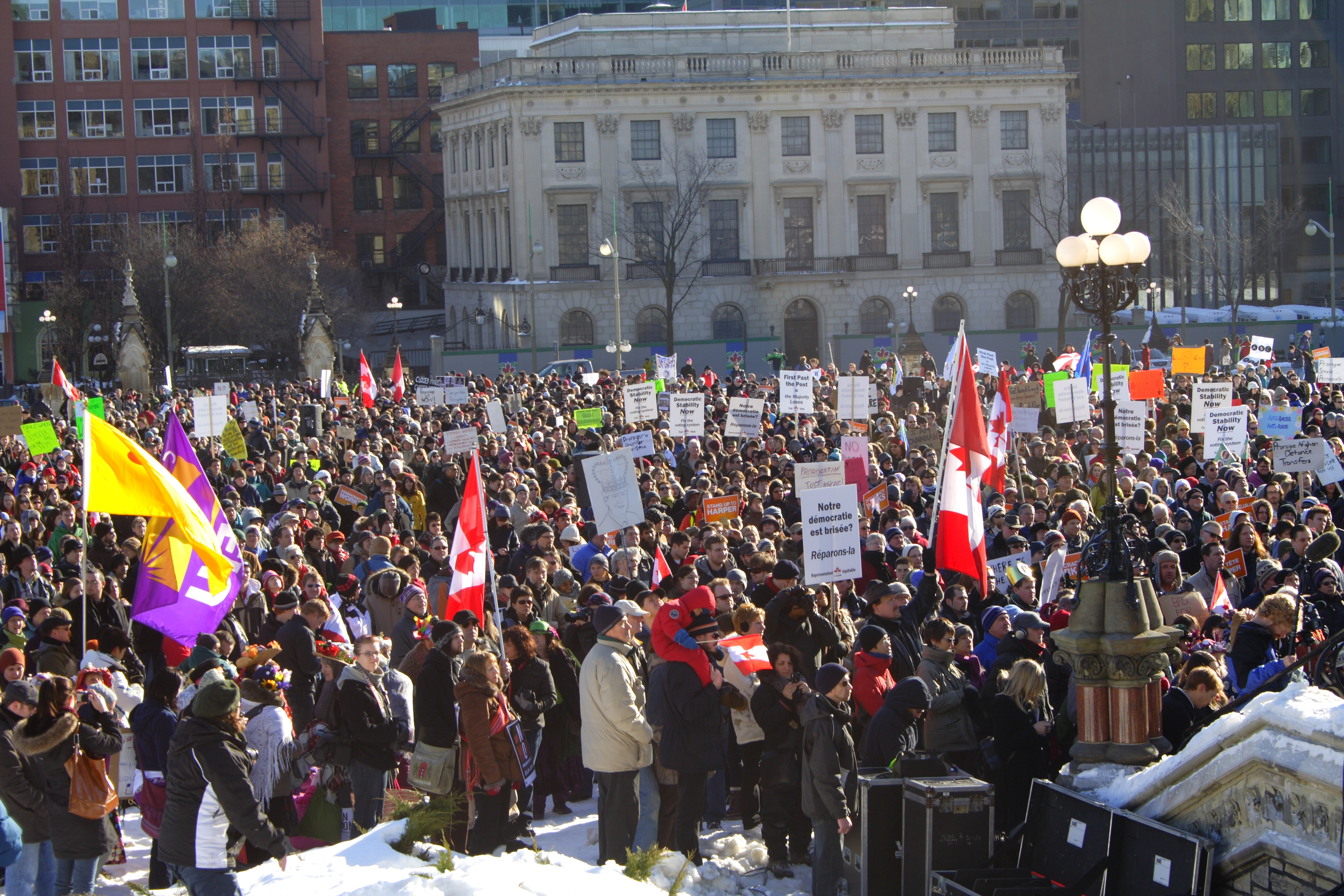
Protest on Parliament Hill in Ottawa against the prorogation

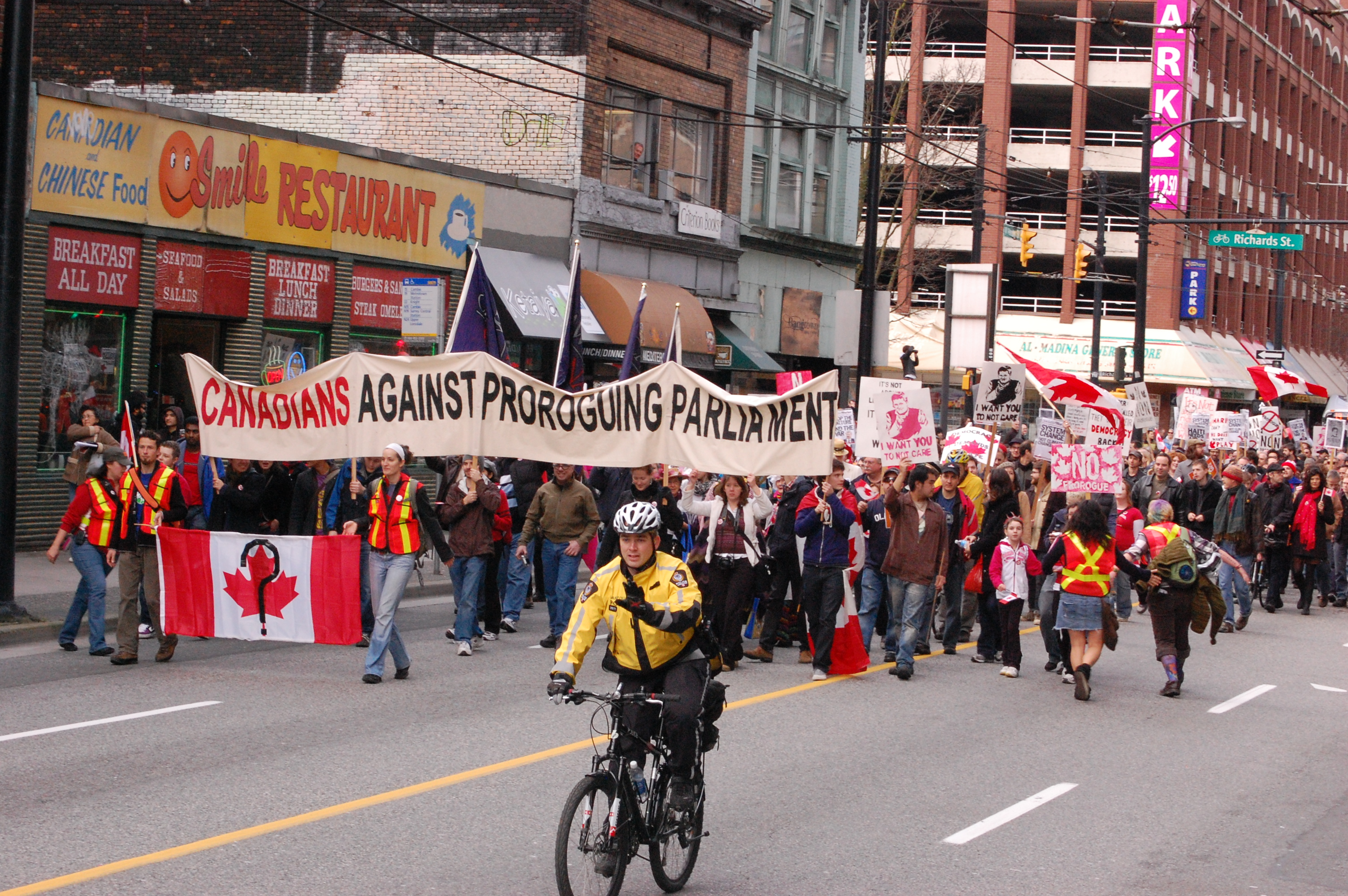
March in Vancouver against the prorogation

On December 30, 2009, Prime Minister Stephen Harper announced that he would advise the Governor General to prorogue parliament during the 2010 Winter Olympics, until March 3, 2010. He telephoned Governor General Michaëlle Jean to ask her permission to end the parliamentary session and Jean signed the proclamation later that day. According to Harper's spokesman, he sought his second prorogation to consult with Canadians about the economy. In an interview with CBC News, Prince Edward Island Liberal member of parliament Wayne Easter accused the Prime Minister of "shutting democracy down". The second prorogation in a year also received some international criticism as being not very democratic.

In response to the prorogation, demonstrations took place on January 23, 2010, in over 60 Canadian cities, and at least four cities in other countries. The protests attracted thousands of participants, many who had joined a group on Facebook.

== Legislation and motions ==
The Conservative government made crime a major focus of the 2nd session. The Conservatives reintroduced their former mandatory minimums bill, known as Bill C-15.

== Parliamentarians ==
=== Senate ===
==== Senate appointments ====
The Senate of Canada has seen new members appointed in blocs of 18, 9, and 5; all were appointed to the Conservative caucus. The balance of power shifted for the first time on August 27, 2009, when the Liberal caucus was reduced to holding a plurality of 52 seats. On January 29, 2010, the balance shifted again as five vacancies were filled by appointed Conservatives, giving them a plurality of 51, with the Liberals holding the next-highest number of seats at 49. The Conservatives achieved an absolute majority when Don Meredith and Larry Smith were appointed on December 20, 2010. After dissolution, Smith and Fabian Manning resigned to run in the 2011 election. That reduced the Conservative caucus to 52, but they retained a majority of sitting senators as there were 50 senators of other parties and 3 vacancies.

==== Honorary senators ====
The Senate of Canada posthumously awarded the title of Honorary Senator during the 40th Parliament to five pioneering women known as The Famous Five.

Emily Murphy
Henrietta Muir Edwards
Nellie McClung
Irene Parlby
Louise McKinney

== Committees ==
=== House ===
- Standing Committee on Aboriginal Affairs and Northern Development
- Standing Committee on Access to Information, Privacy and Ethics
- Standing Committee on Agriculture and Agri-Food
- Standing Committee on Canadian Heritage
- Standing Committee on Citizenship and Immigration
- Standing Committee on Environment and Sustainable Development
- Standing Committee on Finance
- Standing Committee on Fisheries and Oceans
- Standing Committee on Foreign Affairs and International Development
- Standing Committee on Government Operations and Estimates
- Standing Committee on Health
- Standing Committee on Human Resources, Skills and Social Development and the Status of Persons with Disabilities
- Standing Committee on Industry, Science and Technology
- Standing Committee on International Trade
- Standing Committee on Justice and Human Rights
- Standing Committee on National Defence
- Standing Committee on Natural Resources
- Standing Committee on Official Languages
- Standing Committee on Procedure and House Affairs
- Standing Committee on Public Accounts
- Standing Committee on Public Safety and National Security
- Standing Committee on the Status of Women
- Standing Committee on Transport, Infrastructure and Communities
- Standing Committee on Veterans Affairs

=== Senate ===
- Standing Committee on Aboriginal Peoples
- Special Committee on Aging
- Standing Committee on Agriculture and Forestry
- Special Committee on Anti-terrorism
- Standing Committee on Banking, Trade and Commerce
- Standing Committee on Conflict of Interest for Seniors
- Standing Committee on Energy, the Environment and Natural Resources
- Standing Committee on Fisheries and Oceans
- Standing Committee on Foreign Affairs and International Trade
- Standing Committee on Human Rights
- Standing Committee on Internal Economy, Budgets and Administration
- Standing Committee on Legal and Constitutional Affairs
- Standing Committee on National Finance
- Standing Committee on National Security and Defence
  - Subcommittee on Veterans Affairs
- Standing Committee on Official Languages
- Standing Committee on Rules, Procedures and the Rights of Parliament
- Selection Committee
- Standing Committee on Social Affairs, Science and Technology
  - Subcommittee on Cities
  - Subcommittee on Population Health
- Standing Committee on Transport and Communications

=== Joint committees ===
- Standing Joint Committee on Library of Parliament
- Standing Joint Committee on Scrutiny of Regulations

== Ministry ==
Main article: 28th Canadian Ministry

The 28th Canadian Ministry was formed during the 39th Canadian Parliament and lasted until the end of the 41st Canadian Parliament.

== Officeholders ==
=== Head of State ===
| Office | Photo | Name | Assumed office | Left office |
|---|---|---|---|---|
| Sovereign | | Elizabeth II | February 6, 1952 | September 8, 2022 |
| Governor General | | Michaëlle Jean | September 27, 2005 | October 1, 2010 |
| Governor General | | David Johnston | October 1, 2010 | October 2, 2017 |

=== Party leadership ===
| Party | Photo | Name | Assumed Office | Left Office |
|---|---|---|---|---|
| Conservative | | Stephen Harper | March 20, 2004 | October 19, 2015 |
| Liberal | | Stéphane Dion | December 2, 2006 | December 10, 2008 |
| Liberal | | Michael Ignatieff | December 10, 2008 | May 25, 2011 |
| Bloc Québécois | | Gilles Duceppe | March 15, 1997 | May 2, 2011 |
| New Democratic | | Jack Layton | January 25, 2003 | August 22, 2011 |

=== House of Commons ===
==== Presiding officer ====
| Office | Photo | Party | Officer | Riding | Assumed office | Left office |
|---|---|---|---|---|---|---|
| Speaker of the House of Commons | | Liberal | Hon. Peter Milliken | Kingston and the Islands | January 29, 2001 | June 2, 2011 |

==== Government leadership (Conservative) ====
| Office | Photo | Officer | Riding | Assumed Office | Left Office |
|---|---|---|---|---|---|
| Prime Minister | | Stephen Harper | Calgary Southwest | March 20, 2004 | October 19, 2015 |
| House Leader | | Jay Hill | Prince George—Peace River | October 30, 2008 | August 6, 2010 |
| House Leader | | John Baird | Ottawa West—Nepean | August 6, 2010 | May 18, 2011 |
| Whip | | Gordon O'Connor | Prince George—Peace River | October 30, 2008 | July 15, 2013 |

==== Other officeholders ====
- House of Commons Deputy Speaker and Chair of Committees of the Whole: Andrew Scheer, Conservative member for Regina—Qu'Appelle
- Deputy Chair of Committees of the Whole: Denise Savoie, NDP member for Victoria
- Assistant Deputy Chair of Committees of the Whole: Barry Devolin, Conservative member for Haliburton—Kawartha Lakes—Brock

==== Other Floor leaders ====
- Opposition House Leader:
  1. Hon. Ralph Goodale (until Sept 9, 2010)
  2. David McGuinty (from Sept 8, 2010)
- Bloc Québécois House Leader: Pierre Paquette
- New Democratic Party House Leader: Libby Davies

==== Other Whips ====
- Deputy Government Whip: Harold Albrecht
- Official Opposition Whip:
  1. Rodger Cuzner (until Sept 10, 2010)
  2. Marcel Proulx (from Sept 10, 2010)
- Bloc Québécois Whip:
  1. Michel Guimond (until June 22, 2010)
  2. Claude DeBellefeuille (from June 23, 2010)
- New Democratic Party Whip: Yvon Godin

=== Senate ===
==== Speakers ====
- Senate: Noël Kinsella, Conservative Senator for New Brunswick.
- Speaker pro tempore of the Canadian Senate:
  - Rose-Marie Losier-Cool, Liberal Senator from New Brunswick (until March 2, 2010)
  - Donald H. Oliver, Conservative Senator for Nova Scotia (from March 4, 2010)

==== Floor leaders ====
- Leader of the Government in the Senate: Hon. Marjory LeBreton
- Leader of the Opposition in the Senate: Jim Cowan

==== Whips ====
- Government Whip in the Senate:
  - Terry Stratton (until Dec 31, 2009)
  - Consiglio Di Nino (from Jan 1, 2010)
- Deputy Government Whip in the Senate: Stephen Greene
- Opposition Whip in the Senate: Jim Munson
- Deputy Opposition Whip in the Senate: Elizabeth Hubley

== Changes to Party Standings ==
=== By-elections ===
NDP MP Dawn Black resigned her seat of New Westminster—Coquitlam effective April 13, 2009, to run (successfully) in the provincial riding of New Westminster in the 2009 British Columbia general election. The NDP's Fin Donnelly won the seat left vacant by Black in a by-election on November 9, 2009.

Independent MP Bill Casey resigned his seat of Cumberland—Colchester—Musquodoboit Valley effective April 30, 2009, to accept a job as the Nova Scotia Department of Intergovernmental Affairs' senior representative in Ottawa. He was a former Conservative who voted against the 2007 budget, claiming that it broke the Atlantic Accord with his province and Newfoundland and Labrador, and was subsequently expelled from the Conservative caucus. Scott Armstrong, the Conservative candidate, won the by-election for this seat on November 9, 2009.

Bloc Québécois MP Paul Crête resigned his seat of Montmagny—L'Islet—Kamouraska—Rivière-du-Loup on May 21, 2009, to run in a provincial by-election in Rivière-du-Loup. Conservative Bernard Généreux won the November 9, 2009 by-election for this seat.

Bloc Québécois MP Réal Ménard resigned his seat of Hochelaga on September 16, 2009, to run in Montreal's municipal elections. On November 9, 2009, Daniel Paillé won this seat for the Bloc in a by-election.

New Democratic Party MP Judy Wasylycia-Leis (Winnipeg North) resigned from the House on April 30, 2010, to run (unsuccessfully) for the mayoralty of Winnipeg. Liberal Kevin Lamoureux won the by-election to replace her on November 29, 2010.

Liberal MP Maurizio Bevilacqua (Vaughan) resigned from the House effective August 25, 2010 to successfully run for mayor in Vaughan. Conservative Julian Fantino won the November 29, 2010 by-election to replace him.

Conservative MP Inky Mark (Dauphin—Swan River—Marquette) resigned from the House effective September 15, 2010 to run for mayor in Dauphin. Robert Sopuck held the seat for the Conservatives in a by-election held on November 29, 2010.

Bloc Québécois MP Jean-Yves Roy resigned from the House effective October 22, 2010, followed by Conservative MP Jay Hill effective October 25, 2010. Conservative MP Jim Prentice resigned from the House effective November 14, 2010 to take a position with CIBC. By-elections in these three ridings were not scheduled prior to the issue of the writ for the 41st general election.

| By-election | Date | Incumbent | Party | Winner | Party | Cause | Retained |
|---|---|---|---|---|---|---|---|
| Vaughan | November 29, 2010 | Maurizio Bevilacqua | Liberal | Julian Fantino | Conservative | Resigned to run for Mayor of Vaughan | No |
| Dauphin—Swan River—Marquette | November 29, 2010 | Inky Mark | Conservative | Robert Sopuck | Conservative | Resigned to run for Mayor of Dauphin | Yes |
| Winnipeg North | November 29, 2010 | Judy Wasylycia-Leis | New Democratic | Kevin Lamoureux | Liberal | Resigned to run for Mayor of Winnipeg | No |
| Cumberland—Colchester—Musquodoboit Valley | November 9, 2009 | Bill Casey | Independent | Scott Armstrong | Conservative | Resigned to accept appointment with Nova Scotia's Department of Intergovernmental Affairs | No |
| Hochelaga | November 9, 2009 | Réal Ménard | Bloc Québécois | Daniel Paillé | Bloc Québécois | Resigned to run for Montreal City Council | Yes |
| Montmagny—L'Islet—Kamouraska—Rivière-du-Loup | November 9, 2009 | Paul Crête | Bloc Québécois | Bernard Généreux | Conservative | Resigned to enter provincial politics | No |
| New Westminster—Coquitlam | November 9, 2009 | Dawn Black | New Democratic | Fin Donnelly | New Democratic | Resigned to enter provincial politics | Yes |
