= Jim Hnatiuk =

Canadian politician (1950–2018)

James "Jim" Hnatiuk

Leader of the Christian Heritage Party of Canada
- In office November 2008 – February 2014
- Preceded by: Ron Gray
- Succeeded by: David Reimer

Personal details
- Born: August 19, 1950
- Died: August 18, 2018 (aged 67)
- Party: Christian Heritage

Jim Hnatiuk (19 August 1950 – 18 August 2018) was the leader of the Christian Heritage Party of Canada. He was elected to that post in November 2008.

As a youth, he attended a boarding school run by Oblate priests. He joined the Canadian Armed Forces and served with them for 25 years in the Combat Systems Engineering Department in the Canadian Armed Forces attaining the rank of Chief Petty Officer 1st Class.

He was involved with various churches and was a deacon at Emmanuel Baptist Church.

Hnatiuk joined the Christian Heritage Party in 2002 and has run as a candidate for the party in Nova Scotia in the 2004, 2006 and 2008 federal elections.

He became deputy leader of the party in 2005 and was elected leader at the party's November 2008 convention in London, Ontario defeating Harold Ludwig and Rod Taylor on the first ballot of the party's leadership convention.

Hnatiuk was a candidate in the November 9 by-election in the riding of Cumberland—Colchester—Musquodoboit Valley, to replace independent Member of Parliament Bill Casey. He came in fifth, losing to Scott Armstrong of the Conservative Party of Canada.

In his professional life, he operated the largest hunting, fishing and taxidermy business in Nova Scotia. Hnatiuk has also written a book called Know This... from Torments to Miracles.

Electoral record
Election	Division	Party	Votes	%	Place	Winner
2004 federal	Kings-Hants	CHP	486	1.3%	5/6	Scott Brison, Liberal
2006 federal	South Shore-St. Margaret's	CHP	1376	3.4%	4/5	Gerald Keddy, Conservative
2008 federal	Kings-Hants	CHP	528	1.4%	5/5	Scott Brison, Liberal
2009 by-election	Cumberland—Colchester—Musquodoboit Valley	CHP	776	3.2%	5/6	Scott Armstrong, Conservative
