= By-elections to the 40th Canadian Parliament =

2008–2011 elections for vacant seats

- 2008–2011

By-elections to the 40th Canadian Parliament were held to fill vacancies in the House of Commons of Canada between the 2008 federal election and the 2011 federal election. The Conservative Party of Canada led a minority government for the entirety of the 40th Canadian Parliament, with little change from by-elections.

Ten seats became vacant during the life of the Parliament. Seven of these vacancies were filled through by-elections, and three seats remained vacant when the 2011 federal election was called.

== Summary ==
Analysis of byelections by turnout and vote share for winning candidate (vs 2008)
Riding and winning party			Turnout		Vote share for winning candidate	
Riding and winning party			%	Change (pp)	%	Change (pp)
Cumberland—Colchester—Musquodoboit Valley	█ Conservative	Gain	35.81	-21.96	45.84	37.01
Hochelaga	█ Bloc Québécois	Hold	22.63	-35.61	51.16	1.43
Montmagny—L'Islet—Kamouraska—Rivière-du-Loup	█ Conservative	Gain	38.93	-20.56	50.46	8.80
New Westminster—Coquitlam	█ New Democratic	Hold	29.96	-31.78	49.59	7.76
Dauphin—Swan River—Marquette	█ Conservative	Hold	26.62	-28.09	56.49	-4.87
Vaughan	█ Conservative	Gain	32.50	-19.42	49.10	14.77
Winnipeg North	█ Liberal	Gain	30.68	-12.17	46.32	37.11

== Overview ==
By-election	Date	Incumbent	Party	Winner	Party	Cause	Retained
Vaughan	November 29, 2010	Maurizio Bevilacqua	Liberal	Julian Fantino	Conservative	Resigned to run for Mayor of Vaughan	No
Dauphin—Swan River—Marquette	November 29, 2010	Inky Mark	Conservative	Robert Sopuck	Conservative	Resigned to run for Mayor of Dauphin	Yes
Winnipeg North	November 29, 2010	Judy Wasylycia-Leis	New Democratic	Kevin Lamoureux	Liberal	Resigned to run for Mayor of Winnipeg	No
Cumberland—Colchester—Musquodoboit Valley	November 9, 2009	Bill Casey	Independent	Scott Armstrong	Conservative	Resigned to accept appointment with Nova Scotia's Department of Intergovernmental Affairs	No
Hochelaga	November 9, 2009	Réal Ménard	Bloc Québécois	Daniel Paillé	Bloc Québécois	Resigned to run for Montreal City Council	Yes
Montmagny—L'Islet—Kamouraska—Rivière-du-Loup	November 9, 2009	Paul Crête	Bloc Québécois	Bernard Généreux	Conservative	Resigned to enter provincial politics	No
New Westminster—Coquitlam	November 9, 2009	Dawn Black	New Democratic	Fin Donnelly	New Democratic	Resigned to enter provincial politics	Yes

== 2009 ==
Four by-elections to fill vacant seats in the House of Commons were held on November 9, 2009. Governor General Michaëlle Jean, acting on the advice of Prime Minister Stephen Harper, issued writs of election for the by-elections on October 4. All four vacancies were caused by resignations.

=== New Westminster—Coquitlam ===
The riding of New Westminster—Coquitlam had been vacant since April 13, when Dawn Black resigned to run in the British Columbia provincial election.

By-election on November 9, 2009 resignation of Dawn Black
Party	Candidate	Votes	%	±%
New Democratic	Fin Donnelly	12,129	49.6%	+7.8%
Conservative	Diana Dilworth	8,753	35.8%	-3.0%
Liberal	Ken Lee	2,514	10.3%	-1.0%
Green	Rebecca Helps	1,046	4.3%	-2.9%
Total valid votes		24,442		
Total rejected ballots		–		
Turnout		24,442	29.9%	
New Democrat hold				

=== Cumberland—Colchester—Musquodoboit Valley ===
The riding of Cumberland—Colchester—Musquodoboit Valley had been vacant since April 30, 2009, when Bill Casey resigned to accept a posting from the provincial government of Nova Scotia.

Scott Armstrong was nominated unopposed by the Conservatives. Farmer Jim Burrows defeated 2008 Liberal candidate Tracy Parsons for the Liberal nomination on September 12, 2009.

By-election on November 9, 2009 Resignation of Bill Casey
Party	Candidate	Votes	%	±%
Conservative	Scott Armstrong	11,167	45.84%	+37.01%
New Democratic	Mark Austin	6,267	25.73%	+13.41%
Liberal	Jim Burrows	5,193	21.32%	+12.87%
Green	Jason Blanch	803	3.30%	+3.30%
Christian Heritage	Jim Hnatiuk	776	3.19%	+3.19%
Independent	Kate Graves	149	0.61%	
Total valid votes		24,359		
Total rejected ballots		–		
Turnout		24,359	35.7%	
Conservative gain from Independent				

=== Montmagny—L'Islet—Kamouraska—Rivière-du-Loup ===
The riding of Montmagny—L'Islet—Kamouraska—Rivière-du-Loup had been vacant since May 21, when Paul Crête resigned to run as a Parti Québécois candidate in the provincial Rivière-du-Loup by-election.

According to the Regina Leader-Post, Bernard Généreux won the by-election.

By-election on November 9, 2009 resignation of Paul Crête
Party	Candidate	Votes	%	±%
Conservative	Bernard Généreux	12,162	42.7%	+12.07%
Bloc Québécois	Nancy Gagnon	10,737	37.7%	-8.33%
Liberal	Marcel Catellier	3,768	13.2%	-2.15%
New Democratic	François Lapointe	1,363	4.8%	-0.65%
Green	Charles Marois	472	1.7%	-0.49%
Total valid votes		28,502		
Total rejected ballots		–		
Turnout		28,502	36.6%	
Conservative gain from Bloc Québécois				

=== Hochelaga ===
On June 25, 2009, Réal Ménard announced that he would resign from the Hochelaga constituency effective September 16 to run as a Vision Montreal candidate for borough mayor of Mercier–Hochelaga-Maisonneuve in the fall 2009 municipal elections in Montreal.

Daniel Paillé won the by-election according to CBC News.

By-election on November 9, 2009 resignation of Réal Ménard
Party	Candidate	Votes	%	±%
Bloc Québécois	Daniel Paillé	8,972	51.2%	+1.47%
New Democratic	Jean-Claude Rocheleau	3,421	19.5%	+5.06%
Liberal	Robert David	2,510	14.3%	-6.36%
Conservative	Stéphanie Cloutier	1,784	10.2%	+1.01%
Green	Christine Lebel	571	3.3%	-0.95%
neorhino.ca	Gabrielle Anctil	129	0.7%	+0.2%
Marxist–Leninist	Christine Dandenault	79	0.5%	+0.12%
Independent	John Turmel	71	0.4%	ø
Total valid votes		17,526		
Total rejected ballots		–		
Turnout		17,526	22.3%	
Bloc Québécois hold		Swing		{{{3}}}

== 2010 ==
Three by-elections were held on November 29, 2010, in order to fill vacancies in the House of Commons of Canada for two seats in Manitoba and one seat in Ontario. Until pre-empted by the issuance of writs for the 41st federal election, a further three by-elections were pending for one seat in Alberta, one seat in Quebec and one seat in British Columbia.

=== Background ===
The three seats were vacant due to the resignations of Inky Mark, Judy Wasylycia-Leis, and Maurizio Bevilacqua from the House of Commons. The incumbents had resigned their seats to run for the mayoralty of their hometowns in municipal elections. Bevilacqua was subsequently elected mayor of Vaughan, Ontario while Wasylycia-Leis and Mark were defeated in their attempts. A further three seats, Calgary Centre-North, Haute-Gaspésie—La Mitis—Matane—Matapédia and Prince George—Peace River also became vacant in late October or November, however these vacancies occurred too late to be included in the November 29 by-election call.

=== Timing ===
Under Canadian election law, a by-election must be formally announced no earlier than 11 days and no later than 180 days after a vacancy officially takes effect. Due to the timing of the respective resignations, this means that the date of the Winnipeg North by-election had to be announced by October 27, while the scheduling period for all of the other four by-elections extended into 2011. Consequently, the Winnipeg North by-election had to be called at least a week before the window opened in which Prince George—Peace River and Haute-Gaspésie—La Mitis—Matane—Matapédia by-elections could be called.

When multiple vacancies exist, it is customary, though not mandatory, for by-elections to be held on the same date.

=== Dauphin—Swan River—Marquette ===
A by-election was held in the Manitoba federal riding of Dauphin—Swan River—Marquette as incumbent MP Inky Mark resigned effective September 15, 2010 as the Conservative Party of Canada Member of Parliament in order to run unsuccessfully for mayor of Dauphin, Manitoba.

By-election on November 29, 2010 resignation of Inky Mark on September 15, 2010
Party	Candidate	Votes	%	±%
Conservative	Robert Sopuck	8,176	56.7%	-4.66%
New Democratic	Denise Harder	3,785	26.3%	+9.67%
Liberal	Christopher Scott Sarna	1,481	10.3%	-3.67%
Green	Kate Storey	809	5.6%	-0.91%
Christian Heritage	Jerome Dondo	160	1.1%	-0.10%
Total valid votes		14,411		
Total rejected ballots		–		
Turnout		–	26.9	
Conservative hold				

=== Vaughan ===
A by-election was held in the Ontario federal riding of Vaughan as Liberal Maurizio Bevilacqua resigned to run successfully for mayor of Vaughan, Ontario.

Canadian federal by-election, November 29, 2010: Vaughan resignation of Maurizio Bevilacqua on September 2, 2010
Party	Candidate	Votes	%	±%	Expenditures
Conservative	Julian Fantino	19,290	49.10	+14.77	–
Liberal	Tony Genco	18,326	46.65	-2.53	–
New Democratic	Kevin Bordian	661	1.68	-7.96	–
Green	Claudia Rodriguez-Larrain	481	1.22	-5.64	–
Libertarian	Paolo Fabrizio	251	0.64	–	–
Independent	Leslie Bory	111	0.28	–	–
Progressive Canadian	Dorian Baxter	110	0.28	–	–
United	Brian Jedan	55	0.14	–	–
Total valid votes/expense limit		39,285	100.00		$114,412
Total rejected ballots		231	0.58	-0.16	
Turnout		39,516	32.50	-19.42	
Conservative gain from Liberal		Swing		-8.6	

=== Winnipeg North ===
A by-election was held in the Manitoba federal riding of Winnipeg North after New Democratic Party MP Judy Wasylycia-Leis resigned to run unsuccessfully for Mayor of Winnipeg. The seat had been vacant for almost seven months by the time of the vote.

With the addition of the Pirate Party candidate Jeff Coleman, the by-election in Winnipeg North marked the first election or by-election to run a member of the Pirate Party outside of Europe.

By-election on November 29, 2010 resignation of Judy Wasylycia-Leis on April 30, 2010
Party	Candidate	Votes	%	±%
Liberal	Kevin Lamoureux	7,303	46.3	+37.08
New Democratic	Kevin Chief	6,508	41.2	−21.41
Conservative	Julie Javier	1,645	10.4	−11.95
Green	John Harvie	114	0.7	−4.05
Pirate	Jeff Coleman	94	0.6	N/A
Communist	Frank Komarniski	71	0.4	−0.27
Christian Heritage	Eric Truijen	45	0.3	N/A
Total valid votes		15,780		
Total rejected ballots		–		
Turnout		–	30.8	
Liberal gain from New Democrat				

== 2011 ==
=== Cancelled by-elections ===
Until pre-empted by the issuance of writs for the 41st federal election, three federal by-elections were pending in 2011 to fill vacant seats in the House of Commons.

==== Calgary Centre-North ====
A by-election call was pending in the Alberta federal riding of Calgary Centre-North, where Conservative MP Jim Prentice announced on November 4, 2010 he was resigning as Environment Minister effective immediately and that he would be resigning as Member of Parliament for Calgary Centre-North by the end of the year to take a job as vice-chairman of the Canadian Imperial Bank of Commerce. Prentice resigned as the Conservative Member of Parliament for Calgary Centre-North on November 14, 2010. The Prime Minister theoretically had until May 2, 2011 to call a by-election.

Soon after the announcement of Prentice's impending resignation, both Ric McIver and Barb Higgins – the second and third place mayoralty finishers in the 2010 municipal election in Calgary – expressed interest in running for the Conservative Party nomination in Calgary Centre-North. Current Calgary-Foothills MLA Len Webber and recent aldermanic candidate Sean Chu were also rumored to be testing the waters. Ultimately, university administrator and Calgary—Nose Hill riding president Michelle Rempel was acclaimed as the Conservative candidate on December 17, 2010.

Former Ontario Liberal MP Robert Nault and former mayor of Calgary Dave Bronconnier were rumored to be seeking the Liberal nomination. However, Liberal leader Michael Ignatieff appointed Stephen Randall – a University of Calgary professor and the former dean of the Faculty of Social Sciences – as the party's candidate on January 6, 2011.

Heather MacIntosh was nominated to replace Dr. Eric Donovan as the Green Party candidate after winning a three way nomination contest on October 26, 2010.

By-election on superseded by federal election resignation of Jim Prentice on November 14, 2010
Party	Candidate	Votes	%	±%
Conservative	Michelle Rempel	28,443	56.45%	-0.08%
New Democratic	Paul Vargis	8,030	15.94%	+0.62%
Liberal	Stephen Randall	7,114	14.12%	+2.35%
Green	Heather MacIntosh	6,558	13.02%	-2.09%
Marxist–Leninist	Peggy Askin	209	0.41%	+0.03%
Total valid votes		50,384	100.00%	
Total rejected ballots		–		
Turnout		50,384	60.1%	

==== Haute-Gaspésie—La Mitis—Matane—Matapédia ====
A by-election was pending in the Quebec federal riding of Haute-Gaspésie—La Mitis—Matane—Matapédia, where Bloc Québécois MP Jean-Yves Roy resigned on October 22, 2010 as a result of chronic health problems. The Prime Minister theoretically had until April 20, 2011 to drop the writ for a by-election in that riding.

By-election on superseded by general election resignation of Jean-Yves Roy on October 22, 2010
Party	Candidate	Votes	%	±%
Bloc Québécois	Jean-François Fortin	12,633	36.05	-1.48
Liberal	Nancy Charest	8,964	25.58	-10.02
New Democratic	Joanie Boulet	7,484	21.36	+16.67
Conservative	Allen Cormier	5,253	14.99	-3.08
Green	Louis Drainville	707	2.02	-1.55
Total valid votes		35,041	100.00	
Total rejected ballots		393	1.11	+0.07
Turnout		35,434	59.81	+5.43
Eligible voters		59,242	–	

==== Prince George—Peace River ====
A by-election was pending in the British Columbia federal riding of Prince George—Peace River due to the resignation of Conservative MP Jay Hill on October 25, 2010. Prime Minister Harper had until April 22, 2011 to call a by-election.

Notably, in his resignation announcement Hill appeared to suggest that he expected the 41st federal election to be called before a by-election could take place in this riding. He was correct; the Harper government lost a confidence motion on March 25, 2011, triggering an election.

Persons seeking the Conservative Party nomination were former Prince George mayor Colin Kinsley, Tumbler Ridge councilor Jerrilyn Schembri, Prince George city councilor Cameron Stolz, Fort St. John councillors Don Irwin and Dan Davies and Conservative riding association CEO Bob Zimmer. Bob Zimmer was declared the Conservative candidate following a March 11, 2011 nomination meeting in Prince George.

Hilary Crowley was announced as the Green Party candidate on November 12, 2010. Former Deputy Premier and Prince George area MLA, Lois Boone as acclaimed as the NDP candidate on November 27, 2010.

On March 28, 2011, lawyer Ben Levine was nominated as the Liberal candidate.

By-election on superseded by general election resignation of Jay Hill on October 25, 2010
Party	Candidate	Votes	%	±%
Conservative	Bob Zimmer	23,946	62.12	-1.47
New Democratic	Lois Boone	9,876	25.62	+8.04
Green	Hilary Crowley	2,301	5.97	-4.44
Liberal	Ben Levine	2,008	5.21	-3.20
Pirate	Jeremy Cote	415	1.08	
Total valid votes		38,546	100.00	
Total rejected ballots		–		
Turnout		–	–	

== See also ==
- List of federal by-elections in Canada
