= Alana Hirtle =

Canadian politician

Alana Hirtle MP

Member of Parliament for Cumberland—Colchester
- Incumbent
- Assumed office April 28, 2025
- Preceded by: Stephen Ellis

Personal details
- Born: 1968 or 1969
- Party: Liberal
- Website: alanahirtle.liberal.ca

Alana Hirtle MP (born 1968 or 1969) is a Canadian politician from the Liberal Party of Canada. She was elected Member of Parliament for Cumberland—Colchester in the 2025 Canadian federal election. She is a businesswoman from Truro, Nova Scotia.

== Electoral record ==
2025 Canadian federal election: Cumberland—Colchester
| Party | Candidate | Votes | % | ±% | Expenditures |
|---|---|---|---|---|---|
| Liberal | Alana Hirtle | 23,929 | 48.3 | +14.3 | |
| Conservative | Stephen Ellis | 22,701 | 45.8 | +0.1 | |
| New Democratic | Larry Duchesne | 1,873 | 3.8 | -8.5 | |
| Green | Kelly-Ann Callaghan | 694 | 1.4 | -1.2 | |
| People's | Paul Church | 333 | 0.7 | -3.5 | |
| Total valid votes/expense limit | | 49,530 | 99.4 | +0.1 | 127,507.40 |
| Total rejected ballots | | 310 | 0.6 | -0.1 | |
| Turnout | | 49,840 | 70.8 | +10.7 | |
| Eligible voters (Note: Number of eligible voters does not include election day registrations.) | | 70,370 | | | |
| Liberal gain from Conservative | | Swing | | +7.1 | |
Source: Elections Canada
