= Stephen Ellis (politician) =

Canadian politician

Member of Parliament for Cumberland—Colchester
- In office September 20, 2021 – April 28, 2025
- Preceded by: Lenore Zann
- Succeeded by: Alana Hirtle

Personal details
- Born: Stephen Douglas Ellis; 1968
- Party: Conservative
- Education: Dalhousie University
- Occupation: Politician

Stephen Douglas Ellis (born 1968) is a Canadian politician who served as the member of Parliament for the riding of Cumberland—Colchester from 2021 to 2025. He defeated Lenore Zann at the 2021 Canadian federal election. Until 2025 he served as Shadow Minister of Health in Pierre Poilievre’s shadow Cabinet.

== Education ==
Growing up in Lincoln, New Brunswick, Ellis graduated from Oromocto High School. In 1993, Ellis graduated from the Dalhousie University Faculty of Medicine with a Doctor of Medicine.

== Career ==
Ellis was a member of the Royal Canadian Air Force for nine years, attaining the rank of Captain. From 1999 to 2021, Ellis worked as a family physician in Truro for 22 years.

== Electoral record ==
2025 Canadian federal election: Cumberland—Colchester
| Party | Candidate | Votes | % | ±% | Expenditures |
|---|---|---|---|---|---|
| Liberal | Alana Hirtle | 23,929 | 48.31 | +14.11 | $83,010.18 |
| Conservative | Stephen Ellis | 22,701 | 45.83 | –0.19 | $75,306.26 |
| New Democratic | Larry Duchesne | 1,873 | 3.78 | –8.55 | $7,384.94 |
| Green | Kelly-Ann Callaghan | 694 | 1.40 | –1.19 | $1,240.41 |
| People's | Paul Church | 333 | 0.67 | –3.50 | $18.03 |
| Total valid votes/expense limit | | 49,530 | 99.38 | +0.05 | $127,507.40 |
| Total rejected ballots | | 310 | 0.62 | -0.05 | |
| Turnout | | 49,840 | 70.83 | +10.78 | |
| Eligible voters (Note: Number of eligible voters does not include election day registrations.) | | 70,370 | | | |
| Liberal gain from Conservative | | Swing | | +7.15 | |
Source: Elections Canada

2021 Canadian federal election: Cumberland—Colchester
| Party | Candidate | Votes | % | ±% | Expenditures |
|---|---|---|---|---|---|
| Conservative | Stephen Ellis | 18,601 | 46.02 | +10.34 | $74,420.53 |
| Liberal | Lenore Zann | 13,822 | 34.20 | -2.48 | $83,751.17 |
| New Democratic | Daniel Osborne | 4,984 | 12.33 | +0.34 | $3,375.10 |
| People's | Bill Archer | 1,687 | 4.17 | +2.84 | $1,941.16 |
| Green | Jillian Foster | 1,045 | 2.59 | -10.65 | $813.26 |
| Independent | Jody O'Blenis | 278 | 0.69 | +0.37 | none listed |
| Total valid votes/expense limit | | 40,417 | 99.31 | | $109,531.81 |
| Total rejected ballots | | 279 | 0.69 | -0.29 | |
| Turnout | | 40,696 | 60.05 | -8.48 | |
| Registered voters | | 67,768 | | | |
| Conservative gain from Liberal | | Swing | | +6.41 | |
Source: Elections Canada
