= Harry Flemming =

Nova Scotian journalist

Harry Flemming (1933 – 16 February 2008) was a Nova Scotian journalist focused on politics. He was also an unsuccessful candidate for the Liberal Party of Canada in the 1968 Canadian federal election.

Born in Boston, Flemming was raised in Truro and went on to graduate from Mount Allison University and Dalhousie Law School. Involved in politics throughout his life, he tried his hand at politics directly for the first time at age 34 by running for Parliament for the Liberals in the strongly Conservative riding of Cumberland-Colchester North, losing to Progressive Conservative Party of Canada candidate Robert Coates 18,446 votes to 10,139.

Flemming was a well-known journalistic political commentator, for years with the former Halifax Daily News and on television for Canadian Broadcasting Corporation on CBHT's supper hour news show First Edition (with Parker Barss Donham) between 1986 and 1995.

Flemming died on February 16, 2008, of complications from cancer and pneumonia.
