= Dianne Brushett =

Canadian politician (1942–2017)

Dianne Brushett MP

Member of Parliament for Cumberland—Colchester
- In office 1993–1997
- Preceded by: Bill Casey
- Succeeded by: Bill Casey

Personal details
- Born: October 11, 1942 Bath, New Brunswick, Canada
- Died: July 11, 2017 (aged 74) Truro, Nova Scotia, Canada
- Party: Liberal Party of Canada
- Spouse: divorced
- Profession: Businesswoman

Dianne Brushett (October 11, 1942 – July 11, 2017) was a Canadian politician.

== Education ==
She has her master's degree in Atlantic Canada Studies from St. Mary's University, and received her Canadian Securities license after leaving government in 1997.

== Career ==
She co-founded and managed Dominion Biologicals Ltd. until 1990.

== Political career ==
Brushett was a member of the Liberal Party of Canada and a former Member of Parliament in the House of Commons of Canada, representing the riding of Cumberland—Colchester from 1993 to 1997. She served as the Atlantic Regional Assistant Whip while in Parliament. Brushett ran again in the 2000 and 2004 federal elections, but was defeated both times. She previously served as the president of the Cumberland—Colchester—Musquodoboit Valley Liberal Association, ending in 2007.

== Personal life ==
Brushett was divorced and had two children, Sean Brushett and Samara Brushett Richardson. She was a cancer survivor and lived in Truro, Nova Scotia. She died there on July 11, 2017, at the age of 74, having been diagnosed with leukemia 14 months prior.
