= Cumberland—Colchester =

Federal electoral district in Nova Scotia, Canada

Nova Scotia electoral district
- Interactive map of riding boundaries from the 2015 federal election

Federal electoral district
- Legislature: House of Commons
MP
Alana Hirtle
Liberal
- District created: 1966
- First contested: 2004
- Last contested: 2025
- District webpage: profile, map

Demographics
- Population (2016): 80,590
- Electors (2025): 70,003
- Area (km²): 7,906
- Pop. density (per km²): 10.2
- Census division(s): Colchester, Cumberland
- Census subdivision(s): Colchester, Cumberland, Truro, Amherst, Stewiacke, Oxford, Millbrook

Cumberland—Colchester (formerly Cumberland—Colchester—Musquodoboit Valley and North Nova) is a federal electoral district in Nova Scotia, Canada, that has been represented in the House of Commons of Canada since 2004.

Cumberland—Colchester North and Cumberland—Colchester were ridings that covered roughly the same geographic area and were represented in the House of Commons from 1968 to 1979 and 1979 to 2004, respectively.

== Demographics ==
Historical population
Year	Pop.	±%
2001	87,149	—
2006	87,895	+0.9%
2011 (2003 redist.)	87,982	+0.1%
2011 (2015 redist.)	82,321	−6.4%
2016	80,590	−2.1%

According to the 2021 Canadian census, 2023 representation order

Languages: 96.3% English, 1.3% French
Race: 91.7% White, 4.5% Indigenous, 1.5% Black
Religions: 54.6% Christian (15.4% United Church, 13.9% Catholic, 7.5% Baptist, 5.6% Anglican, 2.0% Presbyterian, 10.2% other), 43.6% none
Median income: $35,200 (2020)
Average income: $43,680 (2020)

== Geography ==
The district includes the counties of Cumberland, and Colchester. Communities include the towns of Amherst, Oxford, Parrsboro, Springhill, Stewiacke and Truro, as well as the villages of Bible Hill, Pugwash and Tatamagouche.

== History ==
This riding was created as "Cumberland—Colchester North" in 1966 from Cumberland and Colchester—Hants ridings. It consisted of the county of Cumberland and the northern part of the county of Colchester, including the town of Truro. It was abolished in 1976 when it was merged with the remainder of Colchester County into "Cumberland—Colchester" riding.

Cumberland–Colchester was abolished in 2003. The territory was combined with the largely rural Musquodoboit Valley portion of the Halifax Regional Municipality in a new riding called "North Nova". After the election in 2004, the name was changed to "Cumberland—Colchester—Musquodoboit Valley".

2009 By-election

In early 2009, Incumbent Bill Casey announced he would not be re-offering in the next Federal Election. He subsequently announced his resignation from Parliament to become the Senior Inter-Governmental Affairs Representative for Nova Scotia in Ottawa.

In April 2009 Scott Armstrong was confirmed as the next Conservative Party candidate in the riding. At the time, he was the president of the provincial Progressive Conservative Party.

In September 2009, Jim Burrows was selected as the next Liberal Party candidate in the riding having defeated 2008 candidate, Tracy Parsons. He received 175 of 206 votes cast. He is a dairy farmer from Green Oaks and Chair of the Board of Directors for Scotsburn Co-operative Services.

Mark Austin was selected to run for the New Democratic Party.

Christian Heritage Party ran Jim Hnatiuk, a retired military officer and the owner of Nova Scotia's largest hunting and fishing store, in Lantz. Hnatiuk was chosen party leader in November 2008.

Green Party leader Elizabeth May had said she was interested in running in the by-election, but subsequently announced she would run in the riding of Saanich-Gulf Islands. The party instead ran Jason Blanch.

As per the 2012 federal electoral redistribution, this riding was largely dissolved into the new riding 'Cumberland—Colchester', with small portions going to Central Nova and Sackville—Preston—Chezzetcook.

=== Member of Parliament ===
These ridings have elected the following members of Parliament:

Parliament	Years	Member	Party
Cumberland—Colchester North; Riding created from Cumberland and Colchester—Hants
28th	1968–1972	Robert Coates	Progressive Conservative
29th	1972–1974	Robert Coates	Progressive Conservative
30th	1974–1979	Robert Coates	Progressive Conservative
Cumberland—Colchester
31st	1979–1980	Robert Coates	Progressive Conservative
32nd	1980–1984	Robert Coates	Progressive Conservative
33rd	1984–1988	Robert Coates	Progressive Conservative
34th	1988–1993	Bill Casey	Progressive Conservative
35th	1993–1997	Dianne Brushett	Liberal
36th	1997–2000	Bill Casey	Progressive Conservative
37th	2000–2003	Bill Casey	Progressive Conservative
37th	2003–2004	Bill Casey	Conservative
North Nova
38th	2004–2006	Bill Casey	Conservative
Cumberland—Colchester—Musquodoboit Valley
39th	2006–2007	Bill Casey	Conservative
39th	2007–2008	Bill Casey	Independent
40th	2008–2009	Bill Casey	Independent
40th	2009–2011	Scott Armstrong	Conservative
41st	2011–2015	Scott Armstrong	Conservative
Cumberland—Colchester
42nd	2015–2019	Bill Casey	Liberal
43rd	2019–2021	Lenore Zann	Liberal
44th	2021–2025	Stephen Ellis	Conservative
45th	2025–present	Alana Hirtle	Liberal

== Election results ==
=== Cumberland—Colchester ===
==== 2025 ====
2025 Canadian federal election
Party	Candidate	Votes	%	±%	Expenditures
Liberal	Alana Hirtle	23,929	48.3	+14.3	
Conservative	Stephen Ellis	22,701	45.8	+0.1	
New Democratic	Larry Duchesne	1,873	3.8	-8.5	
Green	Kelly-Ann Callaghan	694	1.4	-1.2	
People's	Paul Church	333	0.7	-3.5	
Total valid votes/expense limit		49,530	99.4	+0.1	127,507.40
Total rejected ballots		310	0.6	-0.1	
Turnout		49,840	70.8	+10.7	
Eligible voters (Note: Number of eligible voters does not include election day registrations.)		70,370			
Liberal gain from Conservative		Swing		+7.1	
Source: Elections Canada

==== 2021 ====
2021 Canadian federal election
Party	Candidate	Votes	%	±%	Expenditures
Conservative	Stephen Ellis	18,601	46.02	+10.34	$74,420.53
Liberal	Lenore Zann	13,822	34.20	-2.48	$83,751.17
New Democratic	Daniel Osborne	4,984	12.33	+0.34	$3,375.10
People's	Bill Archer	1,687	4.17	+2.84	$1,941.16
Green	Jillian Foster	1,045	2.59	-10.65	$813.26
Independent	Jody O'Blenis	278	0.69	+0.37	none listed
Total valid votes/expense limit		40,417	99.31		$109,531.81
Total rejected ballots		279	0.69	-0.29	
Turnout		40,696	60.05	-8.48	
Registered voters		67,768			
Conservative gain from Liberal		Swing		+6.41	
Source: Elections Canada

==== 2019 ====
2019 Canadian federal election
Party	Candidate	Votes	%	±%	Expenditures
Liberal	Lenore Zann	16,672	36.68	−27.05	$91,456.57
Conservative	Scott Armstrong	16,219	35.69	+9.23	none listed
Green	Jason Blanch	6,015	13.23	+9.67	$9,366.06
New Democratic	Larry Duchesne	5,451	11.99	+6.28	$3,860.15
People's	William Archer	608	1.34	New	none listed
Independent	Matthew V. Rushton	232	0.51	New	none listed
Veterans Coalition	Jody O'Blenis	144	0.32	New	none listed
National Citizens Alliance	Stephen J. Garvey	109	0.24	New	none listed
Total valid votes/expense limit		45,450	99.03		$104,050.86
Total rejected ballots		447	0.97	+0.59	
Turnout		45,897	68.54	−2.51	
Eligible voters		66,967			
Liberal hold		Swing		−18.14	
Source: Elections Canada

==== 2015 ====
2015 Canadian federal election
Party	Candidate	Votes	%	±%	Expenditures
Liberal	Bill Casey	29,527	63.73	+45.35	$94,835.51
Conservative	Scott Armstrong	12,257	26.45	–26.48	$155,677.03
New Democratic	Wendy Robinson	2,647	5.71	–16.76	$21,393.25
Green	Jason Matthew Blanch	1,650	3.56	–1.81	$8,721.38
Independent	Kenneth Jackson	181	0.39	–	–
Independent	Richard Trueman Plett	70	0.15	–	–
Total valid votes/Expense limit		46,332	99.62		$207,024.53
Total rejected ballots		178	0.38		
Turnout		46,510	71.64		
Eligible voters		64,923			
Liberal gain from Conservative		Swing		+35.91	
Source: Elections Canada

2011 federal election redistributed results
Party	Vote	%
Conservative	19,875	52.93
New Democratic	8,439	22.48
Liberal	6,902	18.38
Green	2,015	5.37
Others	314	0.84

=== Cumberland—Colchester—Musquodoboit Valley ===
==== 2011 ====
2011 Canadian federal election
Party	Candidate	Votes	%	±%	Expenditures
Conservative	Scott Armstrong	21,041	52.46	+6.62	$84,480.51
New Democratic	Wendy Robinson	9,322	23.24	-2.49	$10,734.51
Liberal	Jim Burrows	7,264	18.11	-3.21	$34,804.26
Green	Jason Blanch	2,109	5.26	+1.95	$5,762.34
Christian Heritage	Jim Hnatiuk	375	0.93	-2.26	$5,478.83
Total valid votes/Expense limit		40,111	100.00		$87,350.74
Total rejected, unmarked and declined ballots		256	0.63	+0.23	
Turnout		40,367	58.34	+22.53	
Eligible voters		69,188			
Conservative hold		Swing		+4.56	
Changes based on 2009 by-election results.

==== 2009 by-election ====
Canadian federal by-election, November 9, 2009 On the resignation of Bill Casey, 11 September 2009
Party	Candidate	Votes	%	±%	Expenditures
Conservative	Scott Armstrong	11,167	45.84	+37.01	$85,124.62
New Democratic	Mark Austin	6,267	25.73	+13.41	$70,020.79
Liberal	Jim Burrows	5,193	21.32	+12.87	$59,031.48
Green	Jason Blanch	807	3.31	–	$3,338.63
Christian Heritage	Jim Hnatiuk	778	3.19	–	$61,482.45
Independent	Kate Graves	149	0.61	–	$1,108.02
Total valid votes/Expense limit		24,361	100.0		$86,242
Total rejected, unmarked and declined ballots		97	0.40	-0.11	
Turnout		24,458	35.81	-21.96	
Eligible voters		68,304			
Conservative gain from Independent		Swing		+11.80	

==== 2008 ====
Incumbent MP Bill Casey, re-elected in 2006 as a member of the Conservative Party, was expelled from the Conservative caucus in 2007 after voting against the 2007 budget, which he objected to on the grounds of alleged violations of the Atlantic Accord. He attempted to run for the Conservative nomination for the next federal election but was refused. Casey therefore ran for re-election as an independent. The Green Party endorsed Casey and did not nominate a candidate opposing his reelection.

2008 Canadian federal election
Party	Candidate	Votes	%	±%	Expenditures
Independent	Bill Casey	27,303	69.01	+16.97	$68,549.58
New Democratic	Karen Olsson	4,874	12.32	-8.42	$6,944.11
Conservative	Joel Bernard	3,493	8.83	-43.21	$35,846.73
Liberal	Tracy Parsons	3,344	8.45	-15.44	$28,266.26
Independent	Rick Simpson	550	1.39	+0.17	none listed
Total valid votes/Expense limit		39,564	100.0		$84,518
Total rejected, unmarked and declined ballots		201	0.51	+0.04	
Turnout		39,765	57.77	-4.08	
Eligible voters		68,831			
Independent gain from Conservative		Swing		+12.68	

==== 2006 ====
2006 Canadian federal election
Party	Candidate	Votes	%	±%	Expenditures
Conservative	Bill Casey	22,439	52.04	+1.55	$50,744.39
Liberal	Gary Richard	10,299	23.89	-2.60	$30,783.20
New Democratic	Margaret Sagar	8,944	20.74	+1.83	$15,901.38
Green	Bruce Farrell	910	2.11	-1.00	$118.51
Independent	Rick Simpson	524	1.22	–	$253.00
Total valid votes/Expense limit		43,116	100.0		$79,110
Total rejected, unmarked and declined ballots		203	0.47	-0.01	
Turnout		43,319	61.85		
Eligible voters		70,036			
Conservative hold		Swing		+2.08	

=== North Nova ===
==== 2004 ====
2004 Canadian federal election
Party	Candidate	Votes	%	±%	Expenditures
Conservative	Bill Casey	20,188	50.49	-9.99	$63,528.46
Liberal	Dianne Brushett	10,591	26.49	+0.13	$40,391.55
New Democratic	Margaret Sagar	7,560	18.91	+5.87	$14,509.58
Green	Sheila Richardson	1,245	3.11	–	$1,050.38
Progressive Canadian	Jack Moors	399	1.00	–	$553.10
Total valid votes/Expense limit		39,983	100.0		$76,024
Total rejected, unmarked and declined ballots		192	0.48		
Turnout		40,175	60.46	-0.32	
Eligible voters		66,451			
Conservative notional gain from Progressive Conservative		Swing		-5.06	
Changes from 2000 are based on redistributed results. Conservative Party change is based on the combination of Canadian Alliance and Progressive Conservative Party totals.

2000 federal election redistributed results
Party	Vote	%
Progressive Conservative	18,984	47.38
Liberal	10,563	26.36
Alliance	5,247	13.10
New Democratic	5,226	13.04
Others	48	0.12

=== Cumberland—Colchester ===
==== 2000 ====
2000 Canadian federal election
Party	Candidate	Votes	%	±%
Progressive Conservative	Bill Casey	18,716	48.49	+4.86
Liberal	Dianne Brushett	10,271	26.61	+0.82
Alliance	Bryden Ryan	4,981	12.91	-1.08
New Democratic	James Harpell	4,629	11.99	-2.21
Total valid votes		38,597	100.00	
Changes for the Canadian Alliance from 1997 are based on its predecessor, the Reform Party.

==== 1997 ====
1997 Canadian federal election
Party	Candidate	Votes	%	±%
Progressive Conservative	Bill Casey	18,610	43.63	+7.15
Liberal	Dianne Brushett	11,002	25.79	-16.80
New Democratic	Peter Stewart	6,058	14.20	+8.64
Reform	Bob Peterson	5,970	13.99	+0.80
Independent	Ray Merriam	826	1.94	
Natural Law	Phyllis Hall	193	0.45	-0.28
Total valid votes		42,659	100.00	

==== 1993 ====
1993 Canadian federal election
Party	Candidate	Votes	%	±%
Liberal	Dianne Brushett	18,195	42.59	+1.03
Progressive Conservative	Bill Casey	15,582	36.48	-9.71
Reform	Audrey Staples	5,636	13.19	
New Democratic	Barbara Jack	2,374	5.56	-3.76
Christian Heritage	Steve McLean	618	1.45	-1.02
Natural Law	Phyllis Hall	312	0.73	
Total valid votes		42,717	100.00	

==== 1988 ====
1988 Canadian federal election
Party	Candidate	Votes	%	±%
Progressive Conservative	Bill Casey	20,384	46.19	-11.10
Liberal	Dennis James	18,340	41.56	+11.96
New Democratic	Barbara Jack	4,112	9.32	-3.78
Christian Heritage	Norman W. Pearce	1,088	2.47	
Independent	Bob Kirk	210	0.48	
Total valid votes		44,134	100.00	

==== 1984 ====
1984 Canadian federal election
Party	Candidate	Votes	%	±%
Progressive Conservative	Robert Coates	24,180	57.30	+11.00
Liberal	Ron Creighton	12,489	29.60	-4.90
New Democratic	Jessie Mae McCarron	5,527	13.10	-4.76
Total valid votes		42,196	100.00	

==== 1980 ====
1980 Canadian federal election
Party	Candidate	Votes	%	±%
Progressive Conservative	Robert Coates	18,436	46.30	-9.46
Liberal	Walter Purdy	13,737	34.50	+4.81
New Democratic	Hayden Trenholm	7,111	17.86	+4.03
Independent	Bob Kirk	337	0.85	+0.12
Independent	Dean Whalen	194	0.49	
Total valid votes		39,815	100.00	

==== 1979 ====
1979 Canadian federal election
Party	Candidate	Votes	%	±%
Progressive Conservative	Robert Coates	22,827	55.76	+2.97
Liberal	Sam Brushett	12,154	29.69	-10.22
New Democratic	Hayden Trenholm	5,662	13.83	+6.91
Independent	Bob Kirk	297	0.73	–
Total valid votes		40,940	100.00	

=== Cumberland–Colchester North ===
==== 1974 ====
1974 Canadian federal election
Party	Candidate	Votes	%	±%
Progressive Conservative	Robert Coates	18,078	52.79	-5.29
Liberal	Sam Brushett	13,666	39.91	+9.57
New Democratic	Allan Marchbank	2,369	6.92	-3.93
Social Credit	Beatrice Holmes	133	0.39	
Total valid votes		34,246	100.00	

==== 1972 ====
1972 Canadian federal election
Party	Candidate	Votes	%	±%
Progressive Conservative	Robert Coates	19,455	58.08	-2.84
Liberal	Dick van Snick	10,163	30.34	-3.14
New Democratic	Allan Marchbank	3,635	10.85	+5.25
Independent	Robert Kirk	245	0.73	
Total valid votes		33,498	100.00	

==== 1968 ====
1968 Canadian federal election
Party	Candidate	Votes	%
Progressive Conservative	Robert Coates	18,446	60.92
Liberal	Harry Flemming	10,139	33.48
New Democratic	Gordon Schurman	1,696	5.60
Total valid votes		30,281	100.00

== See also ==
- List of Canadian electoral districts
- Historical federal electoral districts of Canada
