= Scott Armstrong (politician) =

Canadian politician (born 1966)

The Honourable Scott Armstrong
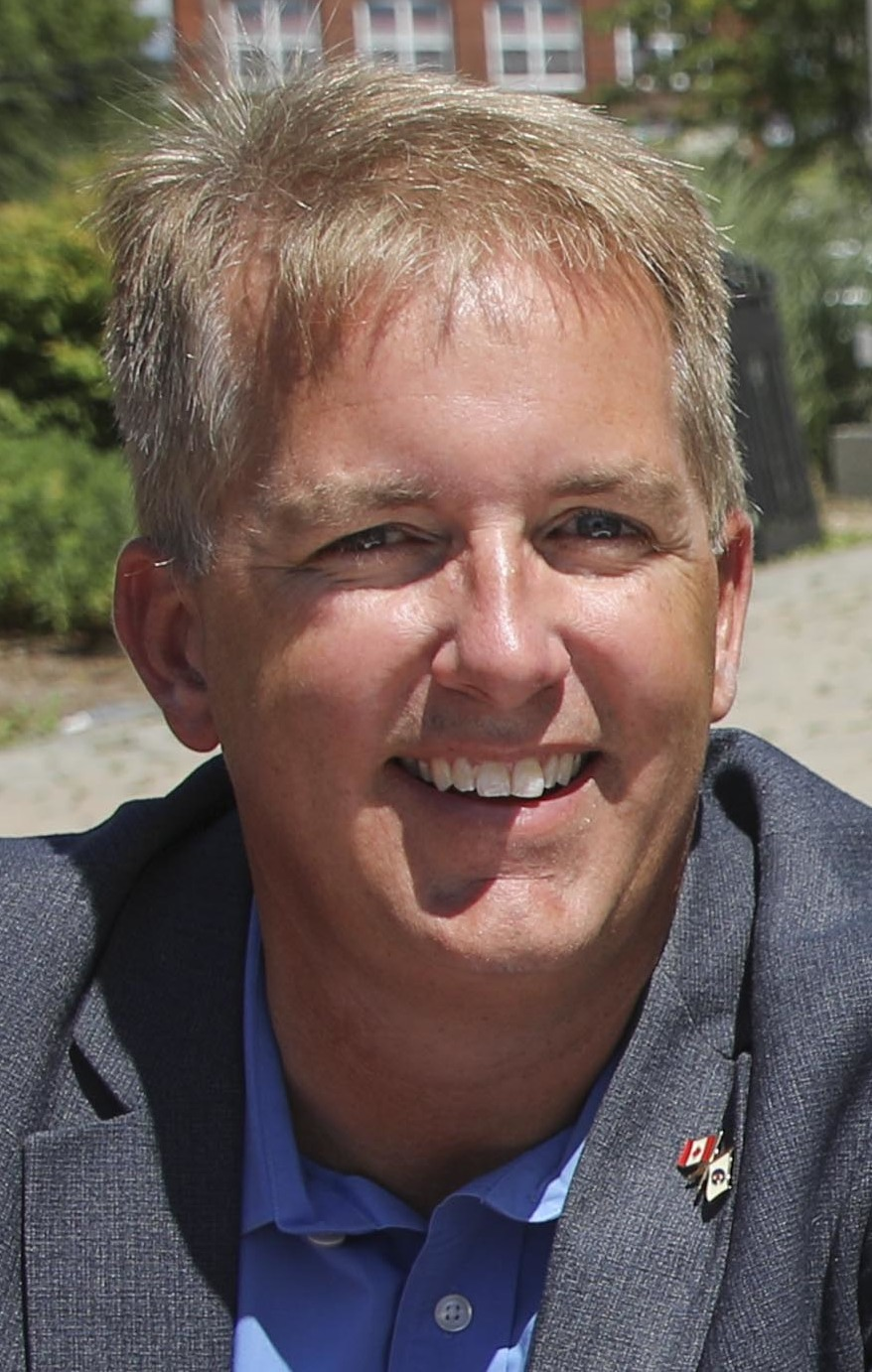
- Armstrong in 2018

Member of Parliament for Cumberland—Colchester—Musquodoboit Valley
- In office November 9, 2009 – October 19, 2015
- Preceded by: Bill Casey
- Succeeded by: Bill Casey

Member of the Nova Scotia House of Assembly for Colchester-Musquodoboit Valley
- Incumbent
- Assumed office November 26, 2024
- Preceded by: Larry Harrison

Personal details
- Born: July 9, 1966 (age 59) Truro, Nova Scotia, Canada
- Party: Progressive Conservative (provincial)
- Other political affiliations: Conservative (federal)
- Profession: Acting Principal

David Scott Armstrong (born July 9, 1966) is a Canadian politician, who was elected as a Conservative member to represent the electoral district of Cumberland—Colchester—Musquodoboit Valley in the federal by-elections on November 9, 2009. He served until his defeat in the 2015 election.

After his defeat in the 2015 election, Armstrong was appointed as the official opposition critic on Atlantic Canadian issues and ACOA and was the only official opposition critic who was not a member of parliament.

On September 15, 2016, it was announced that Armstrong would return to full-time teaching and relinquish his posts with the Conservative Party.

In the 2024 Nova Scotia general election, he was elected to the Nova Scotia House of Assembly for Colchester-Musquodoboit Valley.

== Background ==
Armstrong graduated from Cobequid Education Centre in 1984. He graduated from Acadia University with a Bachelor of Arts. He then went on to earn a Master of Social Science Education from Florida State University and studied at the University of Southern Mississippi as well.

Armstrong has served as a school administrator for over 15 years. Armstrong was principal at Tatamagouche Elementary School in the early 2000s. He was also principal at Truro Elementary School in 2008 and 2009. After his election defeat in 2015 Armstrong returned to his career as an educator. He served as Principal at Great Village Elementary School in 2016/2017, Principal of Debert Elementary 2017/2018, Principal of South Colchester Academy (High School) 2018/2019, Principal of Debert Elementary 2019/2020, and South Colchester Academy 2020/2021. After a two-year secondment as Chair Elect for the Board of Directors of the Public School Administrators Association of Nova Scotia, Armstrong returned to South Colchester Academy for the 2024/2025 school year.

== Community involvement ==
Armstrong is a volunteer on the Children's Aid Society Board and the Hospital Foundation Board. Armstrong is a former president and longstanding volunteer of the Progressive Conservative Party of Nova Scotia, and volunteer with the Conservative Party.

== Political career ==
Following the resignation of then independent Bill Casey in April 2009 as the Member of Parliament for Cumberland—Colchester—Musquodoboit Valley, Armstrong was nominated as the Conservative Party candidate for the byelection to replace him. On November 9, 2009, Armstrong won the byelection, receiving 45.8% of the vote. He was re-elected in the 2011 federal election, receiving 52.5% of the vote. In September 2012, Armstrong was named chairman of the federal Conservative Atlantic caucus, replacing New Brunswick MP Mike Allen. In the 2015 federal election, Armstrong was defeated by Liberal Bill Casey.

=== 40th Parliament ===
Armstrong served as a member on the Standing Committee on Environment and Sustainable Development, the Standing Joint Committee on the Library of Parliament, the Standing Joint Committee on Scrutiny of Regulations and the Standing Committee on Canadian Heritage.

During the 40th Parliament, Armstrong sponsored a Private Member's Bill, Bill C-636 – An Act Respecting the Marine Mammals Regulations (Seal Fishery Observation Licence). The bill would have increased the distance that a person must maintain from another person who is fishing for seals. Bill C-636 did not go beyond first reading.

=== 41st Parliament ===
Armstrong served as a member on the Legislative Committee on Bill C-11, the Standing Committee on Government Operations and Estimates and its Subcommittee on Agenda and Procedure, the Standing Committee on Canadian Heritage and its Subcommittee on Agenda and Procedures, the Standing Committee on Procedure and House Affairs and its Subcommittee on Private Members' Business, the Standing Committee on Justice and Human Rights, the Standing Committee on Human Resources, Skills and Social Development and Status of Persons with Disabilities, and its Subcommittee on Agenda and Procedure.

Armstrong served as Member of Panel of Chairs from September 28, 2011 to September 13, 2013.

Armstrong was appointed Parliamentary Secretary to the Minister of Employment and Social Development on September 19, 2013.

=== Post-parliamentary career ===
After his defeat and because the Conservatives did not elect a single MP in the 32 seats of Atlantic Canada during the 2015 election, Armstrong was appointed Official Opposition Critic for Atlantic Canada and ACOA by Acting Conservative Leader of the Opposition Rona Ambrose. Armstrong was the only Official Opposition critic who was not a member of either the House of Commons or the Senate.

Armstrong worked as a paid staffer in the office of the Leader of the Opposition and spent his time between Ottawa and Atlantic Canada but was based in Nova Scotia. The position paid approximately $60,000 per year out of Ambrose's office budget. He spoke for the Conservatives on the region.

On September 15, 2016, Armstrong relinquished his position with Ambrose's office and as critic to return to full-time teaching.

He re-contested the riding of Cumberland—Colchester in the 2019 federal election but lost narrowly to Liberal candidate Lenore Zann.

=== Provincial politics ===
On October 21, 2024, Armstrong was nominated as the Progressive Conservative candidate in Colchester-Musquodoboit Valley for the 2024 Nova Scotia general election.

On November 26, 2024, he won his seat in the 42nd Nova Scotia Provincial Election for Colchester-Musquodoboit Valley.

On December 12, 2024, Armstrong was appointed to the Executive Council of Nova Scotia as Minister of Opportunities and Social Development. On October 21, 2025, he was appointed Minister of Justice, and Minister responsible for the Office of Equity and Anti-Racism.

== Electoral record ==
2024 Nova Scotia general election: Colchester-Musquodoboit Valley
** Preliminary results — Not yet official **
Party	Candidate	Votes	%	±%
Progressive Conservative	Scott Armstrong	4,048	67.60	+12.47
New Democratic	Janet Moulton	1,113	18.59	-0.67
Liberal	Gwynneth "Gwyn" Bellefontaine	827	13.81	-11.81
Total valid votes		5,988	99.44	
Total rejected ballots		34	0.56	+0.16
Turnout		6,022	39.10	-13.26
Eligible voters		15,403		
Progressive Conservative hold		Swing		+12.14
Source: Elections Nova Scotia

2019 Canadian federal election: Cumberland—Colchester
Party	Candidate	Votes	%	±%	Expenditures
Liberal	Lenore Zann	16,672	36.68	−27.05	$91,456.57
Conservative	Scott Armstrong	16,219	35.69	+9.23	none listed
Green	Jason Blanch	6,015	13.23	+9.67	$9,366.06
New Democratic	Larry Duchesne	5,451	11.99	+6.28	$3,860.15
People's	William Archer	608	1.34	New	none listed
Independent	Matthew V. Rushton	232	0.51	New	none listed
Veterans Coalition	Jody O'Blenis	144	0.32	New	none listed
National Citizens Alliance	Stephen J. Garvey	109	0.24	New	none listed
Total valid votes/expense limit		45,450	99.03		$104,050.86
Total rejected ballots		447	0.97	+0.59	
Turnout		45,897	68.54	−2.51	
Eligible voters		66,967			
Liberal hold		Swing		−18.14	
Source: Elections Canada

2015 Canadian federal election
Party	Candidate	Votes	%	±%	Expenditures
Liberal	Bill Casey	29,527	63.73	+45.35	$94,835.51
Conservative	Scott Armstrong	12,257	26.45	–26.48	$155,677.03
New Democratic	Wendy Robinson	2,647	5.71	–16.76	$21,393.25
Green	Jason Matthew Blanch	1,650	3.56	–1.81	$8,721.38
Independent	Kenneth Jackson	181	0.39	–	–
Independent	Richard Trueman Plett	70	0.15	–	–
Total valid votes/Expense limit		46,332	99.62		$207,024.53
Total rejected ballots		178	0.38		
Turnout		46,510	71.64		
Eligible voters		64,923			
Liberal gain from Conservative		Swing		+35.91	
Source: Elections Canada

2011 Canadian federal election
Party	Candidate	Votes	%	±%	Expenditures
Conservative	Scott Armstrong	21,041	52.46	+6.62	$84,480.51
New Democratic	Wendy Robinson	9,322	23.24	-2.49	$10,734.51
Liberal	Jim Burrows	7,264	18.11	-3.21	$34,804.26
Green	Jason Blanch	2,109	5.26	+1.95	$5,762.34
Christian Heritage	Jim Hnatiuk	375	0.93	-2.26	$5,478.83
Total valid votes/Expense limit		40,111	100.00		$87,350.74
Total rejected, unmarked and declined ballots		256	0.63	+0.23	
Turnout		40,367	58.34	+22.53	
Eligible voters		69,188			
Conservative hold		Swing		+4.56	
Changes based on 2009 by-election results.

Canadian federal by-election, November 9, 2009 On the resignation of Bill Casey, 11 September 2009
Party	Candidate	Votes	%	±%	Expenditures
Conservative	Scott Armstrong	11,167	45.84	+37.01	$85,124.62
New Democratic	Mark Austin	6,267	25.73	+13.41	$70,020.79
Liberal	Jim Burrows	5,193	21.32	+12.87	$59,031.48
Green	Jason Blanch	807	3.31	–	$3,338.63
Christian Heritage	Jim Hnatiuk	778	3.19	–	$61,482.45
Independent	Kate Graves	149	0.61	–	$1,108.02
Total valid votes/Expense limit		24,361	100.0		$86,242
Total rejected, unmarked and declined ballots		97	0.40	-0.11	
Turnout		24,458	35.81	-21.96	
Eligible voters		68,304			
Conservative gain from Independent		Swing		+11.80	
