= Bill Casey =

Canadian politician (born 1945)

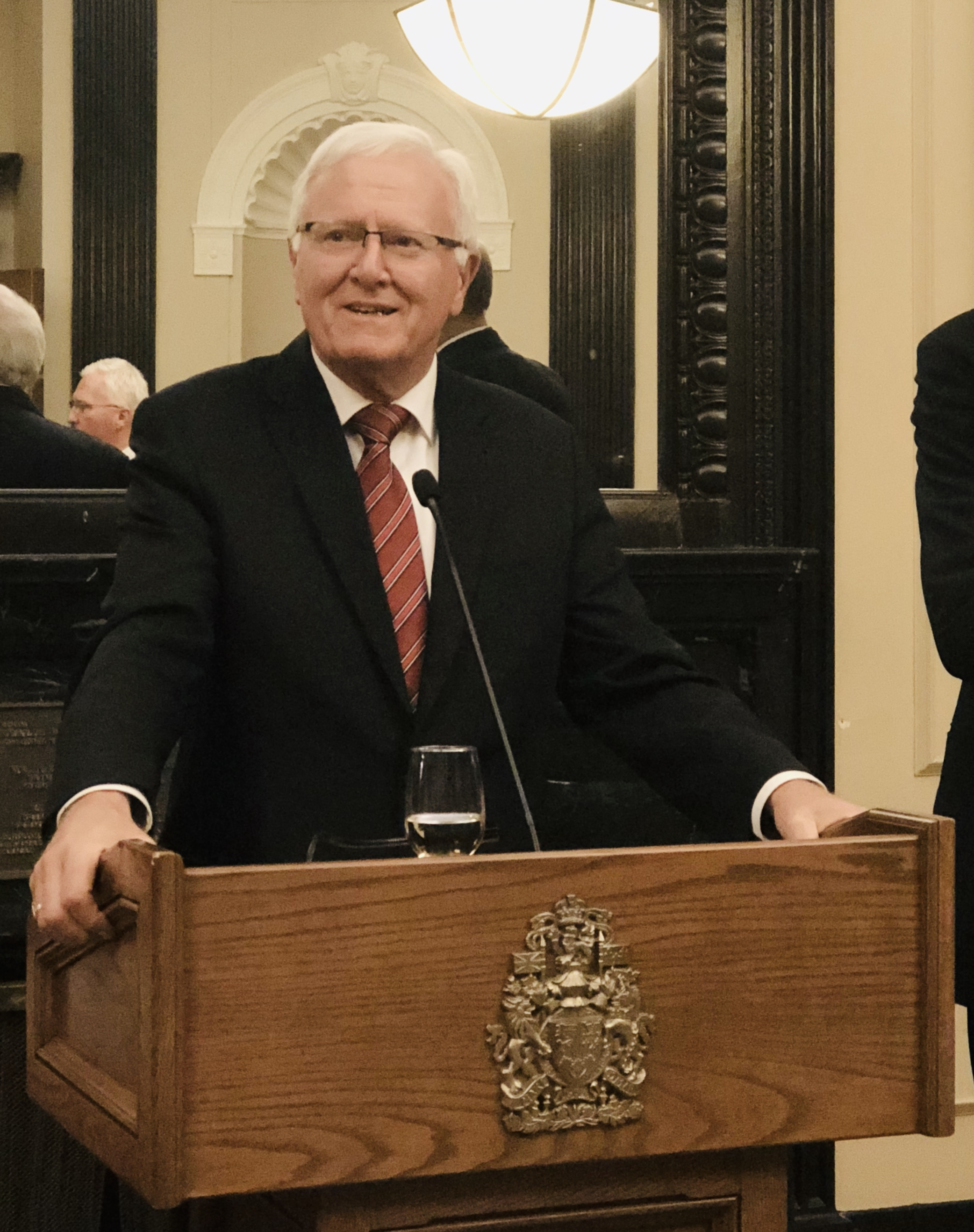

Chair of the Standing Committee on Health
- In office February 3, 2016 – September 11, 2019
- Preceded by: Ben Lobb
- Succeeded by: Ron McKinnon

Member of Parliament for Cumberland—Colchester
- In office October 19, 2015 – October 21, 2019
- Preceded by: first member
- Succeeded by: Lenore Zann
- In office June 2, 1997 – June 28, 2004
- Preceded by: Dianne Brushett
- Succeeded by: Riding Abolished
- In office November 21, 1988 – October 25, 1993
- Preceded by: Robert C. Coates
- Succeeded by: Dianne Brushett

Member of Parliament for Cumberland—Colchester—Musquodoboit Valley
- In office June 28, 2004 – April 30, 2009
- Preceded by: Riding Established
- Succeeded by: Scott Armstrong

Personal details
- Born: February 19, 1945 (age 81) Amherst, Nova Scotia
- Party: Liberal (2014-present)
- Other political affiliations: Progressive Conservative (1988-2003); Conservative (2003-2007); Independent (2007-2014)
- Spouse: Rosemary Casey
- Profession: Businessman, stockbroker

William D. Casey (born February 19, 1945) is a Canadian politician from Nova Scotia who served as a Member of Parliament (MP) in the House of Commons of Canada. First elected as a Progressive Conservative in 1988, he later sat as Conservative MP following the party merger in 2003. In 2007, Casey was expelled from the party for voting against the 2007 budget, but he was reelected as an independent in the 2008 election and sat as such until he resigned his seat in 2009 to work on behalf of the Nova Scotian government for provincial interests in Ottawa. Casey decided to return to federal politics in the 2015 federal election and running as a Liberal easily took the seat with 63.73% of the popular vote.

== Life and career ==
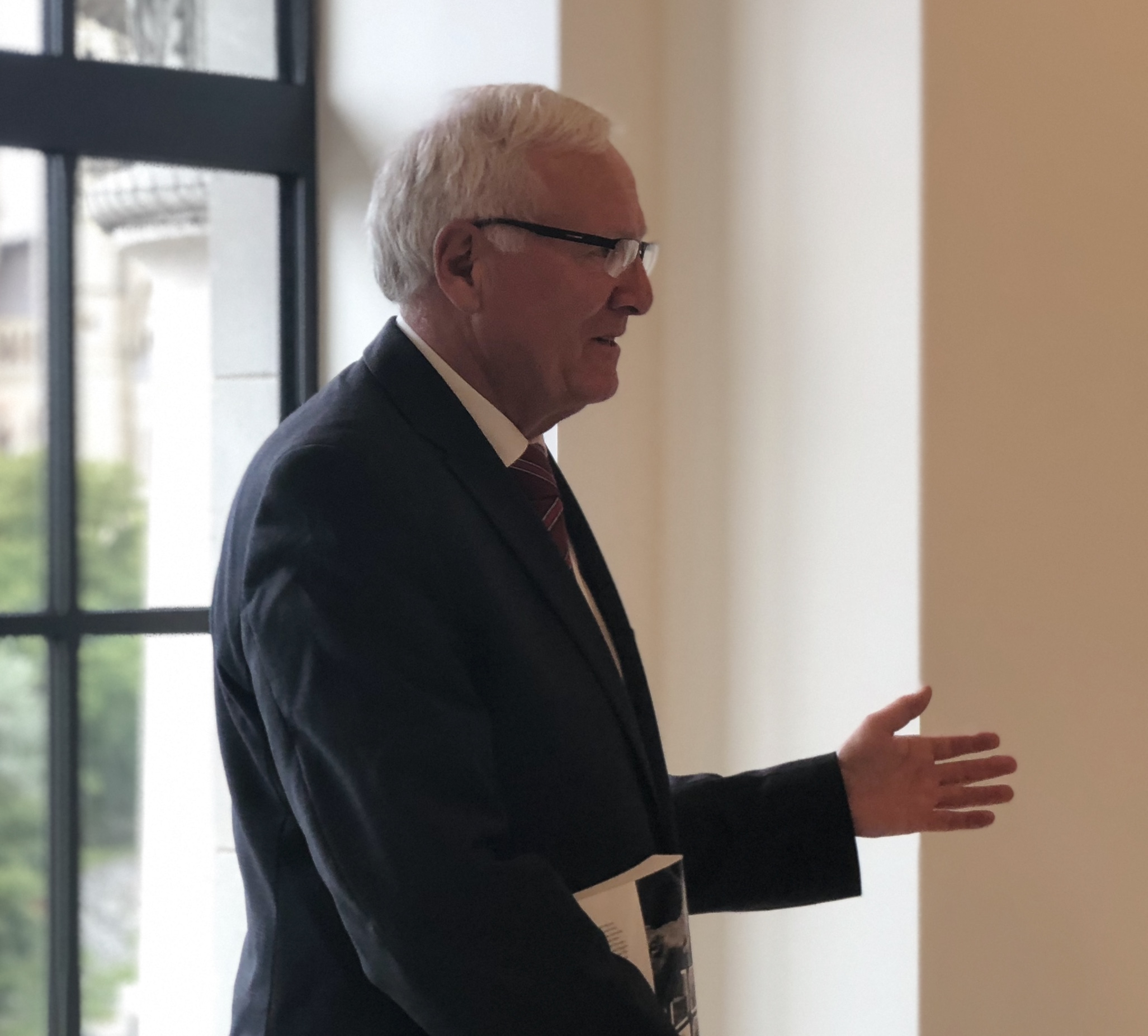
Bill Casey conducting an interview, 2018.

Casey was born in Amherst, Nova Scotia. He was a car salesman and stockbroker before going into politics. He was first elected, as a member of the Progressive Conservative Party of Canada, to represent the riding of Cumberland—Colchester in the 1988 election. In common with almost every other PC Member of Parliament (MP) in the 1993 election he lost his seat, in his case being defeated by Liberal candidate Dianne Brushett.

In the 1997 election, he retook the seat, defeating Brushett, and represented it until April 30, 2009.

In 2003, the PCs merged into the new Conservative Party. He was the deputy whip of the Official Opposition from 2004 until the 2006 election, and had served as the Conservative critic of Transport, International Trade, National Revenue, and Foreign Affairs in the past.

When the Conservatives' 2007 budget was released, Casey praised it, saying: "I have never seen a budget that has had more in it for the people of my riding than this one does." However, on June 5, 2007, he voted against it, claiming that it broke the Atlantic Accord with his province and Newfoundland and Labrador. He was expelled from the Conservative caucus, and sat as an independent MP. During the rest of the 39th Parliament, he styled himself as an Independent Progressive Conservative.

In October 2007, the Conservative Party riding association in Cumberland—Colchester—Musquodoboit Valley renominated Casey as its candidate for the 2008 election. The party's head office refused to accept Casey's nomination, and suspended the association's board.

On January 31, 2008, Casey underwent surgery for prostate cancer. His surgery was a success and all the cancer was removed. Casey previously had to have a cancerous growth removed from his back.

On September 4, the Green Party of Canada declared its support for his candidacy and announced that they would not field a candidate against him in the 2008 election. On October 14, 2008, Casey was re-elected as an independent by winning 69% of the popular vote. His nearest opponent was Karen Olsen of the New Democrats with just 12% of the vote.

During the 2008–2009 Canadian parliamentary dispute, Casey announced he would vote against Harper in a motion of non-confidence. He announced in January 2009 that he would not run for re-election in the next federal election However, on April 28, 2009, Rodney MacDonald, the Premier of Nova Scotia, announced that Casey would be the senior representative for the Department of Intergovernmental Affairs in Ottawa for the province, replacing Ian Thompson. Casey officially resigned his seat on April 30.

On November 18, 2014, Casey announced he was running for the Liberal nomination in his former riding for the 2015 federal election and won the nomination vote on February 28, 2015. On October 19, 2015, Casey won the election, defeating Conservative incumbent Scott Armstrong.

In September 2018, Casey announced that he would not run in the 2019 election.

In July 2021, Casey announced he would run in the next Nova Scotia general election as a candidate for the Nova Scotia Liberal Party in Cumberland North. The incumbent was former PC MLA Elizabeth Smith-McCrossin, who ran as an independent. Casey was unsuccessful losing to Smith-McCrossin.

== Personal life ==
Casey was diagnosed with melanoma in 2006 and underwent two surgeries to have the cancerous mole removed. He battled prostate cancer and underwent surgery in early February 2008.

== Electoral record ==
2021 Nova Scotia general election: Cumberland North
Party	Candidate	Votes	%	±%	Expenditures
Independent	Elizabeth Smith-McCrossin	4,235	53.87	+2.16^{1}	$61,145.93
Liberal	Bill Casey	2,488	31.65	-6.90	$51,915.80
Progressive Conservative	David Wightman	569	7.24	-44.47^{1}	$16,693.84
New Democratic	Lauren Skabar	569	7.24	+0.19	$23,023.94
Total valid votes/expense limit		7,861	99.43	-0.06	$79,940.53
Total rejected ballots		45	0.57	+0.06	
Turnout		7,906	58.59	+5.29	
Eligible voters		13,494			
Independent gain from Progressive Conservative		Swing		+4.53	
Source: Elections Nova Scotia

2015 Canadian federal election: Cumberland—Colchester
Party	Candidate	Votes	%	±%	Expenditures
Liberal	Bill Casey	29,527	63.73	+45.35	–
Conservative	Scott Armstrong	12,257	26.45	–26.48	–
New Democratic	Wendy Robinson	2,647	5.71	–16.77	–
Green	Jason Matthew Blanch	1,650	3.56	–1.81	–
Independent	Kenneth Jackson	181	0.39	–	–
Independent	Richard Trueman Plett	70	0.15	–	–
Total valid votes/Expense limit		46,332	100.0		$206,116.04
Total rejected ballots		178	0.38	–0.25	
Turnout		46,510	71.64	+13.30	
Eligible voters		64,923			
Liberal gain from Conservative		Swing		+35.92	
Source: Elections Canada

2008 Canadian federal election: Cumberland—Colchester—Musquodoboit Valley
Party	Candidate	Votes	%	±%	Expenditures
Independent	Bill Casey	27,303	69.01	+16.97	$68,549.58
New Democratic	Karen Olsson	4,874	12.32	-8.42	$6,944.11
Conservative	Joel Bernard	3,493	8.83	-43.21	$35,846.73
Liberal	Tracy Parsons	3,344	8.45	-15.44	$28,266.26
Independent	Rick Simpson	550	1.39	+0.17	none listed
Total valid votes/Expense limit		39,564	100.0		$84,518
Total rejected, unmarked and declined ballots		201	0.51	+0.04	
Turnout		39,765	57.77	-4.08	
Eligible voters		68,831			
Independent gain from Conservative		Swing		+12.68	

2006 Canadian federal election: Cumberland—Colchester—Musquodoboit Valley
Party	Candidate	Votes	%	±%	Expenditures
Conservative	Bill Casey	22,439	52.04	+1.55	$50,744.39
Liberal	Gary Richard	10,299	23.89	-2.60	$30,783.20
New Democratic	Margaret Sagar	8,944	20.74	+1.83	$15,901.38
Green	Bruce Farrell	910	2.11	-1.00	$118.51
Independent	Rick Simpson	524	1.22	–	$253.00
Total valid votes/Expense limit		43,116	100.0		$79,110
Total rejected, unmarked and declined ballots		203	0.47	-0.01	
Turnout		43,319	61.85		
Eligible voters		70,036			
Conservative hold		Swing		+2.08	

2004 Canadian federal election: North Nova
Party	Candidate	Votes	%	±%	Expenditures
Conservative	Bill Casey	20,188	50.49	-9.99	$63,528.46
Liberal	Dianne Brushett	10,591	26.49	+0.13	$40,391.55
New Democratic	Margaret Sagar	7,560	18.91	+5.87	$14,509.58
Green	Sheila Richardson	1,245	3.11	–	$1,050.38
Progressive Canadian	Jack Moors	399	1.00	–	$553.10
Total valid votes/Expense limit		39,983	100.0		$76,024
Total rejected, unmarked and declined ballots		192	0.48		
Turnout		40,175	60.46	-0.32	
Eligible voters		66,451			
Conservative notional gain from Progressive Conservative		Swing		-5.06	
Changes from 2000 are based on redistributed results. Conservative Party change is based on the combination of Canadian Alliance and Progressive Conservative Party totals.

2000 Canadian federal election: Cumberland—Colchester
Party	Candidate	Votes	%	±%
Progressive Conservative	Bill Casey	18,716	48.49	+4.86
Liberal	Dianne Brushett	10,271	26.61	+0.82
Alliance	Bryden Ryan	4,981	12.91	-1.08
New Democratic	James Harpell	4,629	11.99	-2.21
Total valid votes		38,597	100.00	
Progressive Conservative hold		Swing		2.84

1997 Canadian federal election: Cumberland—Colchester
Party	Candidate	Votes	%	±%
Progressive Conservative	Bill Casey	18,610	43.63	+7.15
Liberal	Dianne Brushett	11,002	25.79	-16.80
New Democratic	Peter Stewart	6,058	14.20	+8.64
Reform	Bob Peterson	5,970	13.99	+0.80
Independent	Ray Merriam	826	1.94	
Natural Law	Phyllis Hall	193	0.45	-0.28
Total valid votes		42,659	100.00	
Progressive Conservative gain from Liberal		Swing		+11.98

1993 Canadian federal election: Cumberland—Colchester
Party	Candidate	Votes	%	±%
Liberal	Dianne Brushett	18,195	42.59	+1.03
Progressive Conservative	Bill Casey	15,582	36.48	-9.71
Reform	Audrey Staples	5,636	13.19	
New Democratic	Barbara Jack	2,374	5.56	-3.76
Christian Heritage	Steve McLean	618	1.45	-1.02
Natural Law	Phyllis Hall	312	0.73	
Total valid votes		42,717	100.00	
Liberal gain from Progressive Conservative		Swing		+5.37

1988 Canadian federal election: Cumberland—Colchester
Party	Candidate	Votes	%	±%
Progressive Conservative	Bill Casey	20,384	46.19	-11.10
Liberal	Dennis James	18,340	41.56	+11.96
New Democratic	Barbara Jack	4,112	9.32	-3.78
Christian Heritage	Norman W. Pearce	1,088	2.47	
Independent	Bob Kirk	210	0.48	
Total valid votes		44,134	100.00	
Progressive Conservative hold		Swing		-11.53
