= 21st Canadian Parliament =

1949–1953 legislative term

- Majority parliament
- Sep. 15, 1949 – May. 14, 1953

Parliament leaders
- Prime minister: Louis St. Laurent; Nov. 15, 1948 – Jun. 21, 1957
- Cabinet: 17th Canadian Ministry
- Leader of the Opposition: George A. Drew; October 2, 1948 – November 1, 1954

Party caucuses
- Government: Liberal Party
- Opposition: Progressive Conservative Party
- Crossbench: Co-operative Commonwealth Federation
- Social Credit Party
- Liberal-Labour
- Liberal-Progressive

House of Commons
- Seating arrangements of the House of Commons
- Speaker of the Commons: William Ross Macdonald; September 15, 1949 – June 11, 1953
- Opposition House leader: Alphonse Fournier; May 1, 1948 – May 8, 1953
- Members: 262 MP seats List of members

Senate
- Speaker of the Senate: Élie Beauregard; August 3, 1949 – October 13, 1953
- Government Senate leader: Wishart McLea Robertson; August 24, 1945 – October 14, 1953
- Opposition Senate leader: John Thomas Haig; September 12, 1945 – June 20, 1957
- Senators: 102 senator seats List of senators

Sovereign
- Monarch: George VI; December 6, 1936 – February 6, 1952
- Elizabeth II; February 6, 1952 – September 8, 2022
- Governor general: Harold Alexander; 12 April 1946 – 28 January 1952
- Vincent Massey; 28 February 1952 – 15 September 1959

Sessions
- 1st session September 15, 1949 – December 10, 1949
- 2nd session February 16, 1950 – June 30, 1950
- 3rd session August 29, 1950 – January 29, 1951
- 4th session January 30, 1951 – October 9, 1951
- 5th session October 9, 1951 – December 29, 1951
- 6th session February 28, 1952 – November 20, 1952
- 7th session November 20, 1952 – May 14, 1953
← 20th	→ 22nd

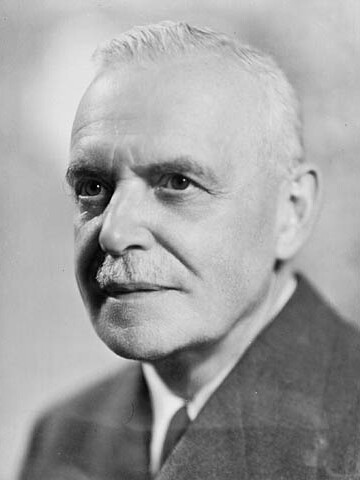
Louis St. Laurent (pictured here in 1950) was Prime Minister during the 21st Canadian Parliament.

The 21st Canadian Parliament was in session from September 15, 1949, until June 13, 1953. The membership was set by the 1949 federal election on June 27, 1949, and it changed only somewhat due to resignations and by-elections until it was dissolved prior to the 1953 election.

There were seven sessions of the 22nd Parliament:

Session	Start	End
1st	September 15, 1949	December 10, 1949
2nd	February 16, 1950	June 30, 1950
3rd	August 29, 1950	January 29, 1951
4th	January 30, 1951	October 9, 1951
5th	October 9, 1951	December 29, 1951
6th	February 28, 1952	November 20, 1952
7th	November 20, 1952	May 14, 1953

== Overview ==
It was controlled by a Liberal Party majority under Prime Minister Louis St. Laurent and the 17th Canadian Ministry. The Official Opposition was the Progressive Conservative Party, led by George Drew.

The Speaker was William Ross Macdonald. See also List of Canadian electoral districts 1947-1952 for a list of the ridings in this parliament.

== Party Standings ==
Number of members per party	Party leader	1949 Canadian federal election
Number of members per party	Party leader	June 27, 1949
Liberal	Louis St. Laurent	191
Progressive Conservative	George Drew	41
Co-operative Commonwealth	M.J. Coldwell	13
Social Credit	Solon Low	10
Other		7
Total Seats		262

== Ministry ==
The 17th Canadian Ministry began at the end of the 20th Canadian Parliament, was sustained through the 21st Canadian Parliament, and lasted until near the end of the 22nd Canadian Parliament.

== Officeholders ==
=== Head of State ===
Office	Photo	Name	Assumed office	Left office
Sovereign		George VI	December 6, 1936	February 6, 1952
Sovereign		Elizabeth II	February 6, 1952	September 8, 2022
Governor General		Harold Alexander, 1st Earl Alexander of Tunis	April 12, 1946	January 28, 1952
Governor General		Vincent Massey	February 28, 1952	September 15, 1959

=== Party leadership ===
Office	Photo	Name	Assumed office	Left office
Liberal		Louis St. Laurent	August 7, 1948	January 16, 1958
Progressive Conservative		George Drew	October 2, 1948	November 1, 1954
Social Credit		Solon Earl Low	April 6, 1944	March 9, 1967
CCF		M.J. Coldwell	July 29, 1942	August 10, 1960

== Changes to party standings ==
=== By-elections ===
By-election	Date	Incumbent	Party	Winner	Party	Cause	Retained
Outremont—St-Jean	October 6, 1952	Édouard-G. Rinfret	Liberal	Romuald Bourque	Liberal	Appointed a Judge of the Court of Queen's Bench of Quebec	Yes
Richelieu—Verchères	October 6, 1952	Gérard Cournoyer	Liberal	Lucien Cardin	Liberal	Resignation	Yes
Ontario	May 26, 1952	Walter Cunningham Thomson	Liberal	Michael Starr	Progressive Conservative	Resignation	No
Gloucester	May 26, 1952	Clovis-Thomas Richard	Liberal	Albany M. Robichaud	Progressive Conservative	Resignation	No
Victoria—Carleton	May 26, 1952	Heber Harold Hatfield	Progressive Conservative	Gage W. Montgomery	Progressive Conservative	Death	Yes
Brome—Missisquoi	May 26, 1952	Henri A. Gosselin	Liberal	Joseph-Léon Deslières	Liberal	Death	Yes
Roberval	May 26, 1952	Joseph-Alfred Dion	Liberal	Paul-Henri Spence	Progressive Conservative	Appointed a Superior Court Judge of Quebec	No
Waterloo North	May 26, 1952	Louis Orville Breithaupt	Liberal	Norman C. Schneider	Liberal	Appointed Lieutenant Governor of Ontario	Yes
Calgary West	December 10, 1951	Arthur LeRoy Smith	Progressive Conservative	Carl Olof Nickle	Progressive Conservative	Resignation	Yes
Brandon	June 25, 1951	James Ewen Matthews	Liberal	Walter Dinsdale	Progressive Conservative	Death	No
Queen's	June 25, 1951	J. Lester Douglas	Liberal	J. Angus MacLean	Progressive Conservative	Death	No
Waterloo South	June 25, 1951	Karl Homuth	Progressive Conservative	Howie Meeker	Progressive Conservative	Death	Yes
Winnipeg South Centre	June 25, 1951	Ralph Maybank	Liberal	Gordon Churchill	Progressive Conservative	Resignation	No
Rimouski	October 16, 1950	Gleason Belzile	Liberal	Joseph-Hervé Rousseau	Independent Liberal	Death	No
St. Mary	October 16, 1950	Gaspard Fauteux	Liberal	Hector Dupuis	Liberal	Resignation	Yes
Welland	October 16, 1950	Humphrey Mitchell	Liberal	William H. McMillan	Liberal	Death	Yes
Joliette—L'Assomption—Montcalm	October 3, 1950	Georges-Émile Lapalme	Liberal	Maurice Breton	Liberal	Resignation	Yes
Annapolis—Kings	June 19, 1950	Angus Alexander Elderkin	Liberal	George Clyde Nowlan	Progressive Conservative	Election declared void	No
Cartier	June 19, 1950	Maurice Hartt	Liberal	Leon Crestohl	Liberal	Death	Yes
Halifax	June 19, 1950	Gordon B. Isnor	Liberal	Sam Balcom	Liberal	Called to the Senate	Yes
Broadview	May 15, 1950	Thomas Langton Church	Progressive Conservative	George Hees	Progressive Conservative	Death	Yes
Hamilton West	May 15, 1950	Colin W. G. Gibson	Liberal	Ellen Fairclough	Progressive Conservative	Appointed a Judge of the Supreme Court of Ontario	No
Gatineau	October 24, 1949	Léon-Joseph Raymond	Liberal	Joseph-Célestin Nadon	Liberal	Appointed Clerk of the House of Commons	Yes
Kamouraska	October 24, 1949	Eugène Marquis	Liberal	Arthur Massé (Note: Massé defeated the official Liberal candidate.)	Independent Liberal	Appointed a Superior Court Judge of Quebec	No
Laurier	October 24, 1949	Ernest Bertrand	Liberal	J.-Eugène Lefrancois	Liberal	Appointed a Judge of the Court of King's Bench of Quebec	Yes
Mercier	October 24, 1949	Joseph Jean	Liberal	Marcel Monette	Liberal	Appointed a Judge of the Supreme Court of the District of Montreal	Yes
Greenwood	October 24, 1949	J. Ernest McMillin	Progressive Conservative	James Macdonnell	Progressive Conservative	Death	Yes
New Westminster	October 24, 1949	Tom Reid	Liberal	William Malcolm Mott	Liberal	Called to the Senate	Yes
Restigouche—Madawaska	October 24, 1949	Benoît Michaud	Liberal	Paul-Léon Dubé	Independent Liberal	Death	No
Jacques Cartier	October 4, 1949	Elphège Marier	Liberal	Edgar Leduc	Independent	Appointed a Superior Court Judge of Quebec	No

== Parliamentarians ==
=== House of Commons ===
Following is a full list of members of the twenty-first Parliament listed first by province, then by electoral district.

Key:

- Party leaders are italicized.
- Parliamentary assistants is indicated by "‡".
- Cabinet ministers are in **boldface**.
- The Prime Minister is **both**.
- The Speaker is indicated by "(†)".

Electoral districts denoted by an asterisk (*) indicates that district was represented by two members.

=== Alberta ===
Electoral district	Name	Party	First elected/previously elected	No. of terms
Acadia	Victor Quelch	Social Credit	1935	4th term
Athabaska	Joseph Miville Dechene	Liberal	1940	3rd term
Battle River	Robert Fair	Social Credit	1935	4th term
Bow River	Charles Edward Johnston	Social Credit	1935	4th term
Calgary East	Douglas Harkness	Progressive Conservative	1945	2nd term
Calgary West	Arthur LeRoy Smith (resigned 5 July 1951)	Progressive Conservative	1945	2nd term
Calgary West	Carl Nickle (by-election of 1951-12-10)	Progressive Conservative	1951	1st term
Camrose	Hilliard Beyerstein	Social Credit	1949	1st term
Edmonton East	Albert Frederick Macdonald	Liberal	1949	1st term
Edmonton West	**George Prudham** ‡	Liberal	1949	1st term
Jasper—Edson	John William Welbourn	Liberal	1949	1st term
Lethbridge	John Horne Blackmore	Social Credit	1935	4th term
Macleod	Ernest George Hansell	Social Credit	1935	4th term
Medicine Hat	William Duncan Wylie	Social Credit	1945	2nd term
Peace River	Solon Earl Low	Social Credit	1945	2nd term
Red Deer	Frederick Davis Shaw	Social Credit	1940	3rd term
Vegreville	John Decore	Liberal	1949	1st term
Wetaskiwin	Ray Thomas	Social Credit	1949	1st term

=== British Columbia ===
Electoral district	Name	Party	First elected/previously elected	No. of terms
Burnaby—Richmond	Tom Goode	Liberal	1949	1st term
Cariboo	George Matheson Murray	Liberal	1949	1st term
Coast—Capilano	**James Sinclair** ‡	Liberal	1940	3rd term
Comox—Alberni	John Lambert Gibson	Independent	1945	2nd term
Fraser Valley	George Cruickshank	Liberal	1940	3rd term
Kamloops	Davie Fulton	Progressive Conservative	1945	2nd term
Kootenay East	Jim Byrne	Liberal	1949	1st term
Kootenay West	Herbert Wilfred Herridge	C.C.F.	1945	2nd term
Nanaimo	George Pearkes	Progressive Conservative	1945	2nd term
New Westminster	Thomas Reid (until 7 September 1949 Senate appointment)	Liberal	1930	5th term
New Westminster	William Mott (by-election of 1949-10-24)	Liberal	1949	1st term
Skeena	Edward Applewhaite	Liberal	1949	1st term
Vancouver—Burrard	Lorne MacDougall	Liberal	1949	1st term
Vancouver Centre	**Ralph Campney** ‡	Liberal	1949	1st term
Vancouver East	Angus MacInnis	C.C.F.	1930	5th term
Vancouver Quadra	Howard Charles Green	Progressive Conservative	1935	4th term
Vancouver South	Arthur Laing	Liberal	1949	1st term
Victoria	**Robert Mayhew**	Liberal	1937	4th term
Victoria	Robert Mayhew resigned upon being named ambassador to Japan on November 14, 1952	Vacant		
Yale	Owen Jones	C.C.F.	1948	2nd term

=== Manitoba ===
Electoral district	Name	Party	First elected/previously elected	No. of terms
Brandon	James Ewen Matthews (died 24 November 1950)	Liberal	1938	4th term
Brandon	Walter Dinsdale (by-election of 1951-06-25)	Progressive Conservative	1951	1st term
Churchill	George Weaver	Liberal	1949	1st term
Dauphin	William John Ward	Liberal	1921, (Note: First elected as a Progressive/Liberal Progressive) 1935, 1949	6th term*
Lisgar	Howard Winkler	Liberal	1935	4th term
Marquette	**Stuart Garson**	Liberal	1948	2nd term
Norquay	Robert James Wood	Liberal	1949	1st term
Portage—Neepawa	William Gilbert Weir	Liberal-Progressive	1930	5th term
Provencher	René Jutras	Liberal	1940	3rd term
Selkirk	William Bryce	C.C.F.	1943	3rd term
Souris	J. Arthur Ross	Progressive Conservative	1940	3rd term
Springfield	John Sinnott	Liberal	1945	2nd term
St. Boniface	Fernand Viau	Liberal	1945	2nd term
Winnipeg North	Alistair Stewart	C.C.F.	1945	2nd term
Winnipeg North Centre	Stanley Knowles	C.C.F.	1942	3rd term
Winnipeg South	Leslie Mutch ‡	Liberal	1935	4th term
Winnipeg South Centre	Ralph Maybank ‡ (resigned 30 April 1951)	Liberal	1935	4th term
Winnipeg South Centre	Gordon Churchill (by-election of 1951-06-25)	Progressive Conservative	1951	1st term

=== New Brunswick ===
Electoral district	Name	Party	First elected/previously elected	No. of terms
Charlotte	A. Wesley Stuart	Liberal	1945	2nd term
Gloucester	Clovis-Thomas Richard (until 5 March 1952 emoulment appointment)	Liberal	1945	2nd term
Gloucester	Albany Robichaud (by-election of 1952-05-26)	Progressive Conservative	1952	1st term
Kent	Aurel Léger	Liberal	1940	3rd term
Northumberland	George Roy McWilliam	Liberal	1949	1st term
Restigouche—Madawaska	Benoît Michaud	Liberal	1945	2nd term
Restigouche—Madawaska	Paul Dubé (by-election of 1949-10-24)	Independent Liberal	1949	1st term
Royal	Alfred Johnson Brooks	Progressive Conservative	1935	4th term
St. John—Albert	Daniel Aloysius Riley	Liberal	1949	1st term
Victoria—Carleton	Heber Harold Hatfield	Progressive Conservative	1940	3rd term
Victoria—Carleton	Gage Montgomery (by-election of 26 May 1952)	Progressive Conservative	1952	1st term
Westmorland	Edmund William George	Liberal	1949	1st term
York—Sunbury	**Milton Fowler Gregg**	Liberal	1947	2nd term

=== Newfoundland ===
Electoral district	Name	Party	First elected/previously elected	No. of terms
Bonavista—Twillingate	**F. Gordon Bradley**	Liberal	1949	1st term
Burin—Burgeo	Chesley W. Carter	Liberal	1949	1st term
Grand Falls—White Bay	Thomas G. W. Ashbourne	Liberal	1949	1st term
Humber—St. George's	William Richard Kent	Liberal	1949	1st term
St. John's East	Gordon Higgins	Progressive Conservative	1949	1st term
St. John's West	William J. Browne	Progressive Conservative	1949	1st term
Trinity—Conception	Leonard Stick	Liberal	1949	1st term

=== Northwest Territories ===
Electoral district	Name	Party	First elected/previously elected	No. of terms
Yukon—Mackenzie River	James Aubrey Simmons	Liberal	1949	1st term

=== Nova Scotia ===
Electoral district	Name	Party	First elected/previously elected	No. of terms
Annapolis—Kings	Angus Elderkin (until election voided 6 March 1950)	Liberal	1949	1st term
Annapolis—Kings	George Nowlan (by-election of 1950-06-19)	Progressive Conservative	1948, 1950	2nd term*
Antigonish—Guysborough	J. Ralph Kirk	Liberal	1949	1st term
Cape Breton North and Victoria	Matthew MacLean	Liberal	1937	4th term
Cape Breton South	Clarence Gillis	C.C.F.	1940	3rd term
Colchester—Hants	Frank Thomas Stanfield	Progressive Conservative	1945	2nd term
Cumberland	Percy Chapman Black	Progressive Conservative	1940	3rd term
Digby—Yarmouth	Thomas Kirk	Liberal	1949	1st term
Halifax*	John Dickey (until 2 May 1950 Senate appointment)	Liberal	1947	2nd term
Halifax*	Gordon B. Isnor	Liberal	1935	4th term
Halifax*	Sam Balcom (by-election of 1950-06-19, replaces Dickey)	Liberal	1950	1st term
Inverness—Richmond	William F. Carroll	Liberal	1911, (Note: Cape Breton South) 1921, (Note: Cape Breton South and Richmond) 1949	3rd term*
Lunenburg	**Robert Winters**	Liberal	1945	2nd term
Pictou	Henry B. McCulloch	Liberal	1935	4th term
Queens—Shelburne	Donald Smith	Liberal	1949	1st term

=== Ontario ===
Electoral district	Name	Party	First elected/previously elected	No. of terms
Algoma East	**Lester B. Pearson**	Liberal	1948	2nd term
Algoma West	George E. Nixon	Liberal	1940	3rd term
Brantford	William Ross Macdonald (†)	Liberal	1935	4th term
Brant—Wentworth	John A. Charlton	Progressive Conservative	1945	2nd term
Broadview	Thomas Langton Church (died 7 February 1950)	Progressive Conservative	1921, (Note: Toronto North/Toronto Northwest) 1934	8th term*
Broadview	George Hees (by-election of 1950-05-15)	Progressive Conservative	1950	1st term
Bruce	Donald Buchanan Blue	Liberal	1949	1st term
Carleton	George Drew	Progressive Conservative	1948	2nd term
Cochrane	Joseph-Arthur Bradette	Liberal	1926	6th term
Danforth	Joseph Henry Harris	Progressive Conservative	1921	8th term
Danforth	Joseph Henry Harris died in office on October 24, 1952	Vacant		
Davenport	Paul Hellyer	Liberal	1949	1st term
Dufferin—Simcoe	William Earl Rowe	Progressive Conservative	1925	7th term
Durham	John James	Liberal	1949	1st term
Eglinton	Donald Fleming	Progressive Conservative	1945	2nd term
Elgin	Charles Delmer Coyle	Progressive Conservative	1945	2nd term
Essex East	**Paul Martin Sr.**	Liberal	1935	4th term
Essex South	Murray Clark	Liberal	1935	4th term
Essex West	Donald Ferguson Brown	Liberal	1945	2nd term
Fort William	Daniel McIvor	Liberal	1935	4th term
Frontenac—Addington	Wilbert Ross Aylesworth	Progressive Conservative	1940	3rd term
Glengarry	William Major	Liberal	1949	1st term
Greenwood	John Ernest McMillin (died 20 August 1949)	Progressive Conservative	1949	1st term
Greenwood	James Macdonnell (by-election of 1949-10-24)	Progressive Conservative	1945, (Note: Muskoka—Ontario) 1949	2nd term*
Grenville—Dundas	Arza Clair Casselman	Progressive Conservative	1921, 1925	8th term*
Grey—Bruce	**Walter Harris**	Liberal	1940	3rd term
Grey North	Colin Emerson Bennett	Liberal	1949	1st term
Haldimand	Earl Catherwood	Progressive Conservative	1949	1st term
Halton	Hughes Cleaver	Liberal	1935	4th term
Hamilton East	Thomas Hambly Ross	Liberal	1940	3rd term
Hamilton West	**Colin Gibson** (until 18 January 1950 judicial appointment)	Liberal	1940	3rd term
Hamilton West	Ellen Fairclough (by-election of 1950-05-15)	Progressive Conservative	1950	1st term
Hastings—Peterborough	George Stanley White	Progressive Conservative	1940	3rd term
Hastings South	Frank Follwell	Liberal	1949	1st term
High Park	Pat Cameron	Liberal	1949	1st term
Huron North	Elston Cardiff	Progressive Conservative	1940	3rd term
Huron—Perth	Andrew Young McLean	Liberal	1949	1st term
Kenora—Rainy River	William Moore Benidickson ‡	Liberal-Labour	1945	2nd term
Kent	Blake Huffman	Liberal	1949	1st term
Kingston City	William James Henderson	Liberal	1949	1st term
Lambton—Kent	Hugh MacKenzie	Liberal	1935, 1949	3rd term*
Lambton West	Joseph Warner Murphy	Progressive Conservative	1945	2nd term
Lanark	William Gourlay Blair	Progressive Conservative	1945	2nd term
Leeds	George Fulford	Liberal	1940, 1949	2nd term*
Lincoln	Harry Cavers	Liberal	1949	1st term
London	Alex Jeffery	Liberal	1949	1st term
Middlesex East	Harry Oliver White	Progressive Conservative	1945	2nd term
Middlesex West	Robert McCubbin ‡	Liberal	1940	3rd term
Nipissing	Jack Garland	Liberal	1949	1st term
Norfolk	Raymond Elmer Anderson	Liberal	1949	1st term
Northumberland	Frederick Robertson	Liberal	1949	1st term
Ontario	Walter Thomson (until resignation)	Liberal	1949	1st term
Ontario	Michael Starr (by-election of 1952-05-26)	Progressive Conservative	1952	1st term
Ottawa East	Jean-Thomas Richard	Liberal	1945	2nd term
Ottawa West	George McIlraith ‡	Liberal	1940	3rd term
Oxford	Clark Murray	Liberal	1949	1st term
Parkdale	John Hunter	Liberal	1949	1st term
Parry Sound-Muskoka	Wilfred McDonald	Liberal	1945	2nd term
Peel	Gordon Graydon	Progressive Conservative	1935	4th term
Perth	James Corry	Liberal	1949	1st term
Peterborough West	Gordon Fraser	Progressive Conservative	1940	3rd term
Port Arthur	**Clarence Decatur Howe**	Liberal	1935	4th term
Prescott	Raymond Bruneau	Independent Liberal	1949	1st term
Prince Edward—Lennox	George Tustin	Progressive Conservative	1935	4th term
Renfrew North	Ralph Warren	Liberal	1937	4th term
Renfrew South	**James Joseph McCann**	Liberal	1935	4th term
Rosedale	Charles Henry	Liberal	1949	1st term
Russell	Joseph-Omer Gour	Liberal	1945	2nd term
St. Paul's	James Rooney	Liberal	1949	1st term
Simcoe East	William Alfred Robinson	Liberal	1940	3rd term
Simcoe North	Julian Ferguson	Progressive Conservative	1940	3rd term
Spadina	David Croll	Liberal	1945	2nd term
Stormont	**Lionel Chevrier**	Liberal	1935	4th term
Sudbury	Léo Gauthier	Liberal	1945	2nd term
Timiskaming	Walter Little	Liberal	1935	4th term
Timmins	Karl Eyre	Liberal	1949	1st term
Trinity	Lionel Conacher	Liberal	1949	1st term
Victoria	Clayton Hodgson	Progressive Conservative	1945	2nd term
Waterloo North	Louis Orville Breithaupt (until resignation to become Ontario Lieutenant-Governor)	Liberal	1940	3rd term
Waterloo North	Norman Schneider (by-election of 1952-05-26)	Liberal	1952	1st term
Waterloo South	Karl Kenneth Homuth (died in office)	Progressive Conservative	1938	4th term
Waterloo South	Howie Meeker (by-election of 1951-06-25)	Progressive Conservative	1951	1st term
Welland	**Humphrey Mitchell** (died 1 August 1950)	Liberal	1931, (Note: Hamilton East (First elected as a Labour)) 1942	4th term*
Welland	William Hector McMillan (by-election of 1950-10-16)	Liberal	1950	1st term
Wellington North	Arnold Darroch	Liberal	1949	1st term
Wellington South	Henry Alfred Hosking	Liberal	1949	1st term
Wentworth	Frank Lennard	Progressive Conservative	1935, 1945	3rd term*
York East	Robert Henry McGregor	Progressive Conservative	1926	6th term
York North	Jack Smith	Liberal	1945	2nd term
York South	Joseph W. Noseworthy	C.C.F.	1942, 1949	2nd term*
York West	Agar Rodney Adamson	Progressive Conservative	1940	3rd term

=== Prince Edward Island ===
Electoral district	Name	Party	First elected/previously elected	No. of terms
King's	Thomas Joseph Kickham	Liberal	1949	1st term
Prince	John Watson Macnaught ‡	Liberal	1945	2nd term
Queen's*	James Lester Douglas (died 30 September 1950)	Liberal	1940	3rd term
Queen's*	Chester McLure	Progressive Conservative	1930, 1945	3rd term*
Queen's*	Angus MacLean (by-election of 1951-06-25, replaces Douglas)	Progressive Conservative	1951	1st term

=== Quebec ===
Electoral district	Name	Party	First elected/previously elected	No. of terms
Argenteuil—Deux-Montagnes	Philippe Valois	Liberal	1949	1st term
Beauce	Raoul Poulin	Independent	1949	1st term
Beauharnois	Robert Cauchon	Liberal	1949	1st term
Bellechasse	Louis-Philippe Picard	Liberal	1940	3rd term
Berthier—Maskinongé	Joseph Langlois	Liberal	1949	1st term
Bonaventure	Bona Arsenault	Liberal	1945	2nd term
Brome—Missisquoi	Henri Gosselin (died 27 January 1952)	Liberal	1949	1st term
Brome—Missisquoi	Joseph-Léon Deslières (by-election of 26 May 1952)	Liberal	1952	1st term
Cartier	Maurice Hartt (died 15 March 1950)	Liberal	1947	2nd term
Cartier	Leon Crestohl (by-election of 19 June 1950)	Liberal	1950	1st term
Chambly—Rouville	Roch Pinard	Liberal	1945	2nd term
Champlain	Joseph Irenée Rochefort	Liberal	1949	1st term
Chapleau	David Gourd	Liberal	1945	2nd term
Charlevoix	Auguste Maltais	Liberal	1949	1st term
Châteauguay—Huntingdon—Laprairie	Donald Elmer Black	Liberal	1935	4th term
Chicoutimi	Paul-Edmond Gagnon	Independent	1945	2nd term
Compton—Frontenac	Joseph-Adéodat Blanchette ‡	Liberal	1935	4th term
Dorchester	Léonard Tremblay	Liberal	1935	4th term
Drummond—Arthabaska	Armand Cloutier	Liberal	1940	3rd term
Gaspé	Léopold Langlois ‡	Liberal	1945	2nd term
Gatineau	Léon Raymond (appointed House of Commons Clerk on 5 August 1949)	Liberal	1945	2nd term
Gatineau	Joseph-Célestin Nadon (by-election of 24 October 1949)	Liberal	1949	1st term
Hochelaga	Raymond Eudes	Liberal	1940	3rd term
Hull	**Alphonse Fournier**	Liberal	1930	5th term
Îles-de-la-Madeleine	Charles Cannon	Liberal	1949	1st term
Jacques Cartier	Elphège Marier (until 24 August 1949 judicial appointment)	Liberal	1939	4th term
Jacques Cartier	Edgar Leduc (by-election of 4 October 1949)	Independent	1949	1st term
Joliette—l'Assomption—Montcalm	Georges-Émile Lapalme (resigned 23 June 1950)	Liberal	1945	2nd term
Joliette—l'Assomption—Montcalm	Maurice Breton (by-election of 3 October 1950)	Liberal	1950	1st term
Kamouraska	Eugène Marquis (until 24 August 1949 judicial appointment)	Liberal	1945	2nd term
Kamouraska	Arthur Massé (by-election of 24 October 1949)	Independent Liberal	1949	1st term
Labelle	Henri Courtemanche	Progressive Conservative	1949	1st term
Lac-Saint-Jean	André Gauthier	Liberal	1949	1st term
Lafontaine	J.-Georges Ratelle	Liberal	1949	1st term
Lapointe	Jules Gauthier	Liberal	1949	1st term
Laurier	Ernest Bertrand (until 24 August 1949 emoulment appointment)	Liberal	1935	4th term
Laurier	J.-Eugène Lefrançois (by-election of 24 October 1949)	Liberal	1949	1st term
Laval	Léopold Demers	Liberal	1948	2nd term
Lévis	Maurice Bourget	Liberal	1940	3rd term
Lotbinière	**Hugues Lapointe**	Liberal	1940	3rd term
Maisonneuve—Rosemont	Sarto Fournier	Liberal	1935	4th term
Matapédia—Matane	Antoine-Philéas Côté	Liberal	1945	2nd term
Mégantic	Joseph Lafontaine	Liberal	1940	3rd term
Mercier	Joseph Jean (until 24 August 1949 emoulment appointment)	Liberal	1932	5th term
Mercier	Marcel Monette (by-election of 24 October 1949)	Liberal	1949	1st term
Montmagny—L'Islet	Jean Lesage ‡	Liberal	1945	2nd term
Mount Royal	Alan Macnaughton	Liberal	1949	1st term
Nicolet—Yamaska	Maurice Boisvert	Liberal	1949	1st term
Notre-Dame-de-Grâce	Fred Whitman	Liberal	1940	3rd term
Outremont—St-Jean	**Édouard Rinfret**	Liberal	1945	2nd term
Outremont—St-Jean	Romuald Bourque (by-election of 6 October 1952)	Liberal	1952	1st term
Papineau	Camillien Houde	Independent	1949	1st term
Pontiac—Témiscamingue	Hugh Proudfoot	Liberal	1949	1st term
Portneuf	Pierre Gauthier	Liberal	1936	4th term
Québec—Montmorency	Wilfrid Lacroix	Liberal	1935	4th term
Quebec East	**Louis St. Laurent**	Liberal	1942	3rd term
Quebec South	Charles Gavan Power	Liberal	1917	9th term
Quebec West	Charles Eugène Parent	Liberal	1935	4th term
Richelieu—Verchères	Gérard Cournoyer (resigned 5 July 1952)	Liberal	1946	2nd term
Richelieu—Verchères	Lucien Cardin (by-election of 6 October 1952)	Liberal	1952	1st term
Richmond—Wolfe	Ernest-Omer Gingras	Liberal	1949	1st term
Rimouski	Gleason Belzile ‡ (died 25 July 1950)	Liberal	1945	2nd term
Rimouski	Joseph Rousseau (by-election of 16 October 1950)	Independent Liberal	1950	1st term
Roberval	Joseph-Alfred Dion (until 8 April 1952 emoulment appointment)	Liberal	1945	2nd term
Roberval	Paul-Henri Spence (by-election of 26 May 1952)	Progressive Conservative	1952	1st term
Saguenay	Lomer Brisson	Liberal	1949	1st term
St. Ann	Thomas Healy	Liberal	1940	3rd term
St. Antoine—Westmount	**Douglas Abbott**	Liberal	1940	3rd term
St-Denis	Azellus Denis	Liberal	1935	4th term
St-Henri	Joseph-Arsène Bonnier	Liberal	1938	4th term
Saint-Hyacinthe—Bagot	Joseph Fontaine	Liberal	1945	2nd term
St. James	Roland Beaudry	Liberal	1945	2nd term
Saint-Jean—Iberville—Napierville	**Alcide Côté**	Liberal	1945	2nd term
St. Lawrence—St. George	**Brooke Claxton**	Liberal	1940	3rd term
St. Mary	Gaspard Fauteux (resigned 18 August 1950)	Liberal	1942	3rd term
St. Mary	Hector Dupuis (by-election of 16 October 1950)	Liberal	1950	1st term
Saint-Maurice—Laflèche	Joseph-Adolphe Richard	Liberal	1949	1st term
Shefford	Marcel Boivin	Liberal	1945	2nd term
Sherbrooke	Maurice Gingues	Liberal	1940	3rd term
Stanstead	Louis-Édouard Roberge	Liberal	1949	1st term
Témiscouata	Jean-François Pouliot	Independent Liberal	1924	8th term
Témiscouata	Jean-François Pouliot	Liberal	1924	8th term
Terrebonne	Lionel Bertrand	Liberal	1940	3rd term
Trois-Rivières	Léon Balcer	Progressive Conservative	1949	1st term
Vaudreuil—Soulanges	Louis-René Beaudoin	Liberal	1945	2nd term
Verdun—La Salle	Paul-Émile Côté ‡	Liberal	1940	3rd term
Villeneuve	Armand Dumas	Liberal	1949	1st term

=== Saskatchewan ===
Electoral district	Name	Party	First elected/previously elected	No. of terms
Assiniboia	Hazen Argue	C.C.F.	1945	2nd term
Humboldt	Joseph Ingolph Hetland	Liberal	1949	1st term
Kindersley	Fred Larson	Liberal	1949	1st term
Lake Centre	John Diefenbaker	Progressive Conservative	1940	3rd term
Mackenzie	Gladstone Ferrie	Liberal	1949	1st term
Maple Creek	Irvin Studer	Liberal	1949	1st term
Meadow Lake	John Harrison	Liberal	1949	1st term
Melfort	Percy Wright	C.C.F.	1940	3rd term
Melville	**James Garfield Gardiner**	Liberal	1936	4th term
Moose Jaw	Ross Thatcher	C.C.F.	1945	2nd term
Moose Mountain	John James Smith	Liberal	1949	1st term
Prince Albert	Francis Helme	Liberal	1949	1st term
Qu'Appelle	Austin Edwin Dewar	Liberal	1949	1st term
Regina City	Emmett McCusker	Liberal	1949	1st term
Rosetown—Biggar	Major James Coldwell	C.C.F.	1935	4th term
Rosthern	William Albert Boucher	Liberal	1948	2nd term
Saskatoon	Roy Knight	C.C.F.	1945	2nd term
Swift Current	Harry Whiteside	Liberal	1949	1st term
The Battlefords	Arthur James Bater	Liberal	1949	1st term
Yorkton	Alan Carl Stewart	Liberal	1949	1st term
