= Loran Ellis Baker (MP) =

Canadian politician (1905–1991)

Member of Parliament for Shelburne—Yarmouth—Clare
- In office 1945–1949
- Preceded by: Vincent-Joseph Pottier
- Succeeded by: riding redistributed into Digby—Yarmouth and Queens—Shelburne ridings

Personal details
- Born: September 21, 1905 Yarmouth, Nova Scotia, Canada
- Died: May 9, 1991 (aged 85)
- Party: Liberal
- Profession: military

Loran Ellis Baker (September 21, 1905 – May 9, 1991) was a Canadian politician. He attended Bishop's College School and McGill University where he was a member of Kappa Alpha Society. Baker was elected to the House of Commons of Canada in the election of 1945 as a Member of the Liberal Party in the riding of Shelburne—Yarmouth—Clare. He also served as Parliamentary Assistant to the Minister of National Defence, near the end of his federal political career. Prior to his federal political experience, he served in the military as a major for the Royal Canadian Artillery in Europe. He was also a councillor for Yarmouth, Nova Scotia between 1934 and 1937.
