= Felton Legere =

Canadian politician

Felton Fenwick Legere

Member of Parliament for Shelburne—Yarmouth—Clare
- In office March 31, 1958 – April 8, 1963
- Preceded by: Thomas Andrew Murray Kirk
- Succeeded by: Frederick Thomas Armstrong

Personal details
- Born: 18 September 1913 Stoney Island, Nova Scotia
- Died: 15 August 1963 (aged 49) Pinkney's Point, Nova Scotia
- Party: Progressive Conservative
- Profession: lobster merchant

Felton Fenwick Legere (18 September 1913 – 15 August 1963) was a Progressive Conservative party member of the House of Commons of Canada.

== Early life ==
He was born in Stoney Island, Nova Scotia, the son of Aldric Legere and Evangeline Amirault. He was a lobster merchant by career.

== Political career ==
He was first elected at the Shelburne—Yarmouth—Clare riding in the 1958 general election and re-elected there in the 1962 election. Legere left federal politics in 1963 after completing his term in the 25th Canadian Parliament.

== Death ==
He died on August 15, 1963, at his home in Pinkney's Point after suffering a heart attack.
