= John Oates Bower =

Canadian politician

- Official 1966 portrait

Member of the Canadian Parliament for Shelburne—Yarmouth—Clare
- In office 1965–1968
- Preceded by: Frederick Thomas Armstrong
- Succeeded by: Riding redistributed into South Shore and South Western Nova ridings.

Personal details
- Born: 14 October 1901 Shelburne, Nova Scotia, Canada
- Died: 16 January 1981 (aged 79) Sandy Point, Nova Scotia, Canada
- Party: Progressive Conservative Party
- Occupation: businessman executive

John Oates Bower (14 October 1901 in Shelburne, Nova Scotia, Canada – 16 January 1981 in Sandy Point, Nova Scotia) was a Canadian politician, businessman and executive. He was elected to the House of Commons of Canada in 1965 as a Member of the Progressive Conservative Party to represent the riding of Shelburne—Yarmouth—Clare. He was previously defeated in the 1963 election.

Bower worked as a geologist for Mobil-affiliated companies Columbian Petroleum and Colsag. He retired from that business in 1969, the year after he left federal politics due to poor health.
