= Frederick Armstrong =

Frederick Armstrong may refer to:

- Frederick C. Armstrong (1896–1918), Canadian First World War flying ace
- Frederick Thomas Armstrong (1907–1990), Canadian politician
