= Shelburne—Yarmouth—Clare =

Former federal electoral district in Nova Scotia, Canada

Shelburne—Yarmouth—Clare was a federal electoral district in the province of Nova Scotia, Canada, that was represented in the House of Commons of Canada from 1935 to 1949 and from 1953 to 1968.

This riding was created in 1933 from parts of Digby and Annapolis and Shelburne—Yarmouth ridings. It consisted of the counties of Shelburne and Yarmouth, and the municipality of Clare in the county of Digby. It was abolished in 1947 when it was redistributed into Digby—Yarmouth and Queens—Shelburne ridings.

It was re-created in 1952 from those two ridings, and was abolished again in 1966 into South Shore and South Western Nova ridings.

== Members of Parliament ==
This riding elected the following Members of Parliament:

Parliament	Years	Member	Party
Shelburne—Yarmouth—Clare; Riding created from Digby and Annapolis and Shelburne—Yarmouth
18th	1935–1940	Vincent Pottier	Liberal
19th	1940–1945	Vincent Pottier	Liberal
20th	1945–1949	Loran Baker	Liberal
Riding dissolved into Digby—Yarmouth and Queens—Shelburne
22nd	1953–1957	Thomas Kirk	Liberal
23rd	1957–1958	Thomas Kirk	Liberal
24th	1958–1962	Felton Legere	Conservative
25th	1962–1963	Felton Legere	Conservative
26th	1963–1965	Frederick Armstrong	Liberal
27th	1965–1968	John Bower	Conservative
Riding dissolved into South Shore and South Western Nova

== Election results ==
=== 1935–1949 ===
1935 Canadian federal election
Party	Candidate	Votes
Liberal	Vincent Joseph Pottier	11,102
Conservative	René-Wilfrid-Emilien Landry	5,086
Reconstruction	James Donald Burton	1,594

1940 Canadian federal election
Party	Candidate	Votes
Liberal	Vincent-Joseph Pottier	10,851
National Government	James Marven Walker	6,569

1945 Canadian federal election
Party	Candidate	Votes
Liberal	Loran Ellis Baker	9,341
Progressive Conservative	Ulric Gathorne Dawson	8,595
Co-operative Commonwealth	Ronald Grantham	1,071

=== 1953–1968 ===
1953 Canadian federal election
Party	Candidate	Votes
Liberal	Thomas Andrew Murray Kirk	11,556
Progressive Conservative	Donald Farish Filleul	7,392

1957 Canadian federal election
Party	Candidate	Votes
Liberal	Thomas Andrew Murray Kirk	10,734
Progressive Conservative	James Douglas Trefry	9,806

1958 Canadian federal election
Party	Candidate	Votes
Progressive Conservative	Felton Fenwick Legere	12,071
Liberal	Thomas Andrew Murray Kirk	10,187

1962 Canadian federal election
Party	Candidate	Votes
Progressive Conservative	Felton Fenwick Legere	11,162
Liberal	Frederick Thomas Armstrong	10,665
Social Credit	Ashley Allen Crowell	374
New Democratic	Arthur P. Monahan	329

1963 Canadian federal election
Party	Candidate	Votes
Liberal	Frederick Thomas Armstrong	11,607
Progressive Conservative	John O. Bower	10,380
Social Credit	Ashley Allen Crowell	220
New Democratic	Victor A. Ross	215

1965 Canadian federal election
Party	Candidate	Votes
Progressive Conservative	John O. Bower	10,744
Liberal	Frederick T. Armstrong	9,884
New Democratic	A. Boyd MacGillivray	1,538

== See also ==
- List of Canadian electoral districts
- Historical federal electoral districts of Canada
