= Lloyd Crouse =

Canadian politician (1918–2007)

The Honourable Lloyd Crouse PC ONS
- Official 1984 House of Commons portrait

28th Lieutenant Governor of Nova Scotia
- In office February 20, 1989 – June 23, 1994
- Monarch: Elizabeth II
- Governors General: Jeanne Sauvé; Ray Hnatyshyn
- Premier: John Buchanan; Roger S. Bacon; Don W. Cameron; John Savage
- Preceded by: Alan Abraham
- Succeeded by: James Kinley

Member of Parliament for South Shore (Queens—Lunenburg; 1957–1968)
- In office June 10, 1957 – November 21, 1988
- Preceded by: Robert Henry Winters
- Succeeded by: Peter McCreath

Personal details
- Born: Lloyd Roseville Crouse; November 19, 1918 Lunenburg, Nova Scotia
- Died: April 28, 2007 (aged 88) Lunenburg, Nova Scotia
- Spouse: Marion Crouse
- Profession: Businessman; politician

Lloyd Roseville Crouse PC ONS (November 19, 1918 – April 28, 2007) was a Canadian businessman, politician and the 28th Lieutenant Governor of Nova Scotia.

== Early life ==
Crouse was born in 1918 in Lunenburg, Nova Scotia. In his youth, Crouse established three fishing companies. During World War II, he served as a pilot with the Royal Canadian Air Force.

== Political career ==
Crouse entered politics winning a seat in the House of Commons of Canada as the Progressive Conservative Member of Parliament (MP) for Queens—Lunenburg, and was re-elected on ten successive occasions. (Beginning with the 1968 election his riding changed to South Shore.)

He chose not to run in the 1988 election, and a few months later was appointed as Lieutenant Governor of Nova Scotia. He retired from the position in 1994.

== Awards and recognition ==
width=100

In 1985, in honour of his long political service, he was appointed to the Queen's Privy Council for Canada, entitling him to use the prenominal title "The Honourable". He received the Order of Nova Scotia in 2002.

== Death ==
In 2007, he died at the age of 88 in his hometown of Lunenburg.
