= Gerald Keddy =

Canadian politician

Member of Parliament for South Shore—St. Margaret's South Shore (1997–2004)
- In office June 2, 1997 – August 4, 2015
- Preceded by: Derek Wells
- Succeeded by: Bernadette Jordan

Chair of the Standing Committee on Fisheries & Oceans
- In office May 9, 2006 – November 13, 2007
- Minister: Loyola Hearn
- Preceded by: Tom Wappel
- Succeeded by: Fabian Manning

Personal details
- Born: Gerald Gordon Keddy; February 15, 1953 (age 73) Bridgewater, Nova Scotia, Canada
- Party: Conservative Party of Canada
- Spouse: Judy Streatch
- Profession: offshore driller Christmas tree producer

Gerald Gordon Keddy (born February 15, 1953) is a Canadian politician. Keddy is a former Christmas tree grower, and offshore drill operator and was a Member of Parliament from 1997 to 2015, first sitting with the Progressive Conservative Party of Canada and latterly with its successor the Conservative Party of Canada. Keddy was chair of The Standing Committee on Fisheries, and later long time Parliamentary Secretary for International Trade, Atlantic Canada Opportunities, and then National Revenue and Agriculture. His wife, Judy Streatch, is a former Nova Scotia MLA and cabinet minister.

== Early life and education ==
Keddy was born in Bridgewater, Nova Scotia. He graduated from Acadia University in 1975 with a Bachelor of Arts in History.

== Political career ==
He was a member of the House of Commons of Canada, representing the riding of South Shore from 1997 to 2004, and South Shore—St. Margaret's from 2004 to 2015. He was a member of the Progressive Conservative Party before 2004, and then joined the Conservative Party of Canada. He served as the Whip and the Deputy Whip of the Progressive Conservative Party, and as critic of Indian Affairs and Northern Development, Natural Resources, Fisheries and Oceans, Public Accounts, Parliamentary Affairs, and Library of Parliament.

As a member of Stephen Harper's caucus, he served as the Chairman of the Commons Standing Committee on Fisheries and Oceans. On October 10, 2007, Keddy was appointed Parliamentary Secretary for the Atlantic Canada Opportunities Agency and has subsequently also served as Parliamentary Secretary to the Minister of International Trade and Parliamentary Secretary to the Minister of Agriculture and to the Minister of National Revenue. He also served as a school board trustee in New Ross, Nova Scotia.

Keddy did not stand for re-election in 2015 and retired from parliament.

== Same sex marriage ==
He was one of only a handful of Conservative MPs to support same-sex marriage. His stance on this issue cost him votes in the western portion of his riding in the 2006 Canadian federal election, including some to Christian Heritage Party candidate Jim Hnatiuk who ran specifically to protest Keddy's stance on this issue. However, an evenly split opposition (Liberal and New Democrat rivals came within 60 votes of each other) and rising Green Party also split his opposition's vote, and Keddy won re-election.

== Lighthouses ==
Keddy's riding included many historic lighthouses and is in fact known as the "Lighthouse Route". In 2006, he sponsored in the House of Commons a bill which had emerged from the Senate, the Heritage Lighthouse Protection Act, until Parliament was prorogued in 2007. Keddy supported the Act when it was re-introduced by MP Larry Miller in 2008, which led to Royal Assent on May 29, 2008.

== Government Cheques with Conservative Party ethics probe ==
In 2009, Keddy used a ceremonial cheque at a funding announcement which contained a large Conservative party logo and was in the blue colour scheme associated with the party. Usually such cheques carry the Government of Canada logo. The use of the partisan cheque was found to be "inappropriate" but not "illegal" by the Ethics Commissioner

== November 2009 "no-good bastards" comment ==
On November 23, 2009, Keddy sparked a controversy when he was discussing the use of immigrant labour in the industry when he remarked that "Nova Scotians won’t do it — all those no-good bastards sitting on the sidewalk in Halifax that can’t get work." Keddy apologized for the remark the following day, saying, "In no way did I mean to offend those who have lost their job due to the global recession, nor did I mean to suggest that anyone who is unemployed is not actively looking for employment."
