= Rick Perkins =

Canadian politician

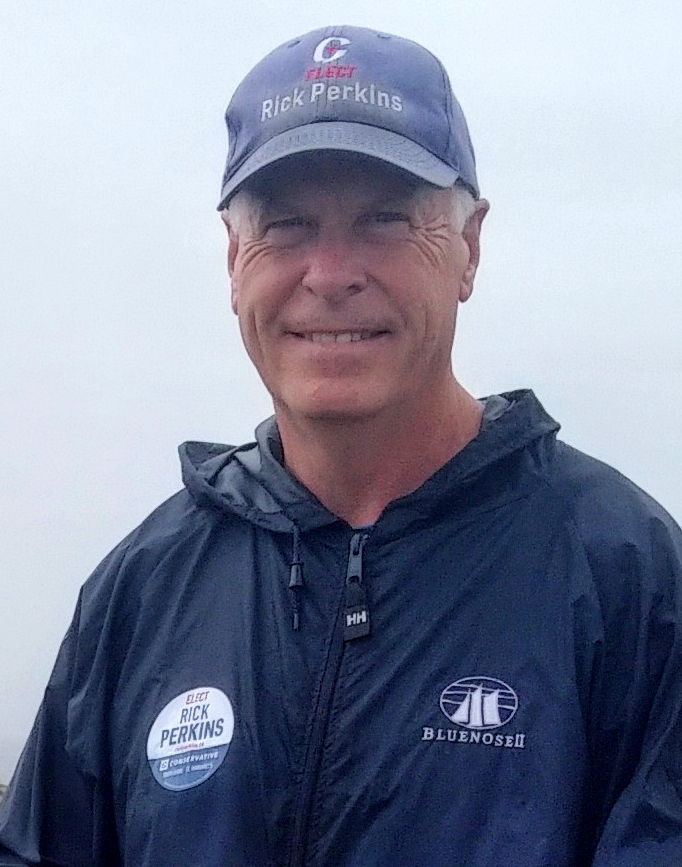

Member of Parliament for South Shore—St. Margarets
- In office September 20, 2021 – April 28, 2025
- Preceded by: Bernadette Jordan
- Succeeded by: Jessica Fancy-Landry

Shadow Ministers for Innovation, Science, and Industry
- In office October 12, 2022 – April 28, 2025
- Leader: Pierre Poilievre
- Shadowing: François-Philippe Champagne
- Preceded by: Ed Fast

Shadow Ministers of Fisheries, Oceans and the Canadian Coast Guard
- In office November 9, 2021 – October 12, 2022
- Leader: Pierre Poilievre; Candice Bergen; Erin O'Toole
- Shadowed: Joyce Murray
- Preceded by: Richard Bragdon
- Succeeded by: Clifford Small

Personal details
- Born: November 4, 1961 (age 64) Halifax, Nova Scotia, Canada
- Party: Conservative
- Spouse: Wendy Perkins
- Education: Saint Mary's University (MBA)
- Occupation: Politician

Rick Perkins (born November 4, 1961) is a Canadian politician who was Member of Parliament for the riding of South Shore—St. Margarets from 2021 to 2025.

== Background ==
Perkins holds an MBA from the Sobey School of Business at Saint Mary's University. He worked on the political staff to Canadian Conservative Minister the Honourable Barbara McDougall during the two terms of the government of Prime Minister Brian Mulroney. After the 1993 federal election Rick worked for two financial services companies CIBC and Newcourt Credit Group before co-founding the investor relations firm Genoa Management. He left this firm to become retail executive and business strategist. His most notable business achievement was the hostile takeover he engineered of Liquor Stores North America, which was the largest publicly traded retailer of beverage alcohol in North America. He served on the Board of Directors and senior management of this company. He previously ran in Scarborough—Agincourt for the Progressive Conservatives in the 1997 Canadian federal election and in South Shore—St. Margarets for the Conservatives in the 2019 Canadian federal election.

== Political career ==
=== 44th Canadian Parliament (2021–2025) ===
In the 2021 Canadian federal election, Perkins was elected to the House of Commons of Canada for South Shore—St. Margarets, defeating Liberal incumbent and Ministers of Fisheries, Oceans and the Canadian Coast Guard Bernadette Jordan.

On November 9, 2021, Perkins was named Shadow Minister for Fisheries, Oceans and the Canadian Coast Guard by Conservative Party leader Erin O'Toole. Upon assuming the role Perkins was appointed as Vice-Chair of the Canadian House of Commons Standing Committee on Fisheries and Oceans, as well as a member of the Subcommittee on Agenda and Procedure of the Standing Committee on Fisheries and Oceans.

Following O'Toole's ousting as party leader in February 2022, Perkins was reappointed as Shadow Minister for Fisheries by interim party leader Candice Bergen.

In March 2022, Perkins was one of 313 Canadian officials barred from entering Russia. The Russian ban was in response to new Canadian economic sanctions targeting Russian officials and entities following Russia’s invasion of Ukraine in late February. In response to ban, Perkins stated on social media that he would “wear this [ban] as a badge of honor” as he continues to stand in solidarity with the people of Ukraine.

During the 2022 Conservative Party of Canada leadership election Perkins endorsed hopeful leadership candidate Jean Charest and was further named co-chair of the campaigns national advisory board. Following Pierre Poilievre’s victory in the leadership race, Perkins immediately congratulated him on becoming the new party leader. In a post-leadership interview with the National Post Perkins stated that the Conservative caucus was now “totally united” behind Poilievre despite what the tone of the leadership contest might have indicated."

Upon becoming the new leader, Poilievre kept Perkins on as the fisheries critic until October 12, 2022, until he was then replaced by Newfoundland MP Clifford Small. Perkins then became the Shadow Minister for Innovation, Science, and Industry, replacing former critic Ed Fast. Upon assuming the new critic position, Perkins was named Vice-Chair of the Canadian House of Commons Standing Committee on Industry and Technology, and was further appointed to the Subcommittee on Agenda and Procedure for the Standing Committee on Industry and Technology. Perkins was a member of the House of Commons Standing Committee on Fisheries, Oceans and the Canadian Coast Guard for the 44th Canadian Parliament.

In the 2025 Canadian federal election, Perkins was defeated in re-election, with Liberal Jessica Fancy-Landry being elected to the seat.

At the time of the 2025 Canadian federal election, he lived in Ingramport, Nova Scotia.

== Political positions ==
=== 2020 Mi'kmaq lobster dispute ===
Perkins was an outspoken critic of Minister Bernadette Jordan's handling of the 2020 Mi'kmaq lobster dispute. Perkins called on her to respect the Supreme Court’s R v Marshall decision, which stated that the Mi’kmaq treaty rights could be regulated and that the Mi'kmaq were not guaranteed an open season in the fisheries. Jordan's handling of the dispute and subsequent criticism played an important role in her electoral defeat.

After defeating Jordan in the 2021 Canadian federal election, Perkins stated in an interview with Global News that he would seek to "find a path forward that [would] bring everyone under the same set of rules and the same regulation through DFO."

== Electoral record ==
2025 Canadian federal election: South Shore—St. Margarets
Party	Candidate	Votes	%	±%	Expenditures
Liberal	Jessica Fancy-Landry	27,831	54.88	+19.30	$120,708.39
Conservative	Rick Perkins	20,864	41.14	−2.25	$123,852.88
Green	Mark Embrett	818	1.61	−1.22	$0.00
People's	Patrick Shea Boyd	698	1.38	N/A	$4,786.23
Independent (Note: The New Democratic Party stated that Henderson would represent the NDP, but that due to a late change in the party's candidate, this endorsement could not be registered with Elections Canada.)	Hayden Henderson	500	0.99	N/A	$0.00
Total valid votes/expense limit		50,711	99.26	+0.06	$127,514.63
Total rejected ballots		376	0.74	–0.06	
Turnout		51,087	72.77		
Eligible voters (Note: Number of eligible voters does not include voting day registrations.)		70,205			
Liberal notional gain from Conservative		Swing		+10.78	
Source: Elections Canada

2021 Canadian federal election: South Shore—St. Margarets
Party	Candidate	Votes	%	±%	Expenditures
Conservative	Rick Perkins	20,454	40.90	+12.83	$114,937.56
Liberal	Bernadette Jordan	18,575	37.15	−4.52	$101,389.53
New Democratic	Olivia Dorey	9,541	19.08	+3.16	$21,851.45
Green	Thomas Trappenberg	1,434	2.87	−14.47	$2,256.32
Total valid votes/expense limit		50,004	100.0	—	$115,179.35
Total rejected ballots		400			
Turnout		50,404	63.16	−4.53	
Registered voters		79,797			
Source: Elections Canada

2019 Canadian federal election: South Shore—St. Margarets
Party	Candidate	Votes	%	±%	Expenditures
Liberal	Bernadette Jordan	21,886	41.67	−15.26	$101,013.68
Conservative	Rick Perkins	14,744	28.07	+5.51	$86,186.65
New Democratic	Jessika Hepburn	8,361	15.92	−0.91	none listed
Green	Thomas Trappenberg	6,070	11.56	+8.65	$3,255.40
People's	Robert Monk	667	1.27	New	none listed
Independent	Steven Foster	376	0.72	New	$662.21
Independent	Shawn McMahon	165	0.31	New	$0.00
Veterans Coalition	Jason Matthews	125	0.24	New	none listed
Christian Heritage	Kevin Schulthies	124	0.24	New	$234.83
Total valid votes/expense limit		52,518	100.0		$109,434.66
Total rejected ballots		439	0.83	+0.40	
Turnout		52,957	67.69	−2.14	
Eligible voters		78,238			
Liberal hold		Swing		−10.38	
Source: Elections Canada

1997 Canadian federal election: Scarborough—Agincourt
Party	Candidate	Votes	%	±%	Expenditures
Liberal	Jim Karygiannis	25,995	65.1	+5.3	$47,944
Progressive Conservative	Rick Perkins	7,115	17.8	−3.4	$41,232
Reform	Edward Lee	4,291	10.8	−3.8	$0.00
New Democratic	Doug Hum	2,512	6.3	+4.0	$15,398
Total valid votes/expense limit		39,913	100.0	$104,574	
