= George Nowlan =

Canadian politician

The Honourable George Nowlan PC
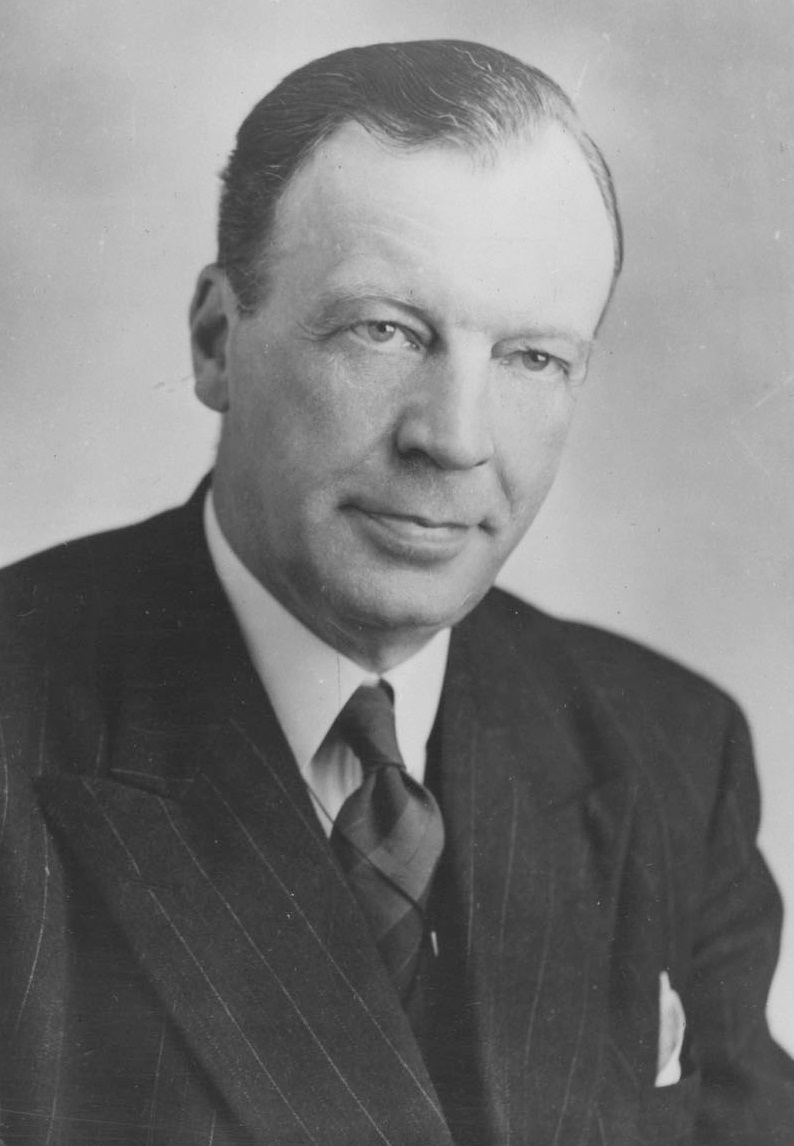

Minister of Finance
- In office 9 August 1962 – 21 April 1963
- Prime Minister: John Diefenbaker
- Preceded by: Donald Fleming
- Succeeded by: Walter L. Gordon

Minister of National Revenue
- In office 21 June 1957 – 8 August 1962
- Prime Minister: John Diefenbaker
- Preceded by: James Joseph McCann
- Succeeded by: Hugh John Flemming

Member of Parliament for Digby—Annapolis—Kings Annapolis—Kings (1950-1953)
- In office 19 June 1950 – 8 November 1965
- Preceded by: Angus Elderkin
- Succeeded by: Pat Nowlan
- In office 13 December 1948 – 27 June 1949
- Preceded by: James Lorimer Ilsley
- Succeeded by: Riding dissolved

Member of the Nova Scotia House of Assembly for Kings
- In office 25 June 1925 – 22 August 1933
- Preceded by: James Sealy, John Alexander McDonald
- Succeeded by: John Alexander McDonald

Personal details
- Born: 14 August 1898 Havelock, Nova Scotia, Canada
- Died: 31 May 1965 (aged 66) Ottawa, Ontario, Canada
- Party: Progressive Conservative
- Spouse: Miriam Chisholm (m. 1923)
- Children: 4, including Pat
- Occupation: Barrister; Lawyer

George Clyde Nowlan PC (14 August 1898 – 31 May 1965) was a Canadian Member of Parliament and Cabinet Minister. A member of the Progressive Conservative Party of Canada, he served as Minister of Finance in the government of John Diefenbaker, and was also responsible for the CBC.

== Early life and education ==
Nowlan was born on 14 August 1898 in Havelock, Nova Scotia to the Irish-Canadian Charles Randall Nowlan and his wife Hattie Euphemia DeLong. Nowlan was a soldier in the Canadian Expeditionary Force during the First World War. After the war ended, he returned to the Annapolis Valley of Nova Scotia and attended Acadia University to study for a Bachelor of Arts, graduating in 1920. He then studied law at Dalhousie University.

== Political career ==
Nowlan was an MLA in the Nova Scotia Legislature in the 1920s, and was always known for his reputation as a hard worker and a Party Man. He served a term as the Progressive Conservative Party's president. While serving as Minister of National Revenue in 1962, he forbid Customs to censor or ban entrance to any publication unless a Canadian court had already ruled it to be "obscene", rather than using their own discretion. Five years later, this was overturned.

There is a George Clyde Nowlan fonds at Library and Archives Canada.

== Personal life ==
His son Pat Nowlan later became a Progressive Conservative (and later Independent Progressive Conservative) MP in Nowlan's riding of Kings County.
