= Annapolis—Kings =

Former federal electoral district in Nova Scotia, Canada

Nova Scotia electoral district

Defunct federal electoral district
- Legislature: House of Commons
- District created: 1947
- District abolished: 1952
- First contested: 1949
- Last contested: 1950 by-election

Annapolis—Kings was a federal electoral district in the province of Nova Scotia, Canada, that was represented in the House of Commons of Canada from 1949 to 1953.

This riding was created in 1947 from Digby—Annapolis—Kings. It consisted of the counties of Annapolis and Kings. It was abolished in 1952 when it was redistributed into Digby—Annapolis—Kings riding.

== Members of Parliament ==
This riding elected the following members of Parliament:

Parliament	Years	Member	Party
Annapolis—Kings; Riding created from Digby—Annapolis—Kings
21st	1949–1950	Angus Elderkin	Liberal
21st	1950–1953	George Nowlan	Progressive Conservative
Riding dissolved into Digby—Annapolis—Kings

== Election results ==
1949 Canadian federal election
Party	Candidate	Votes
Liberal	Angus Alexander Elderkin	13,202
Progressive Conservative	George Nowlan	13,198

By-election on 19 June 1950 On Mr. Elderkin's election being declared void, 6 March 1950
Party	Candidate	Votes
Progressive Conservative	George Nowlan	14,255
Liberal	Angus Alexander Elderkin	11,670

== See also ==
- List of Canadian electoral districts
- Historical federal electoral districts of Canada
