= Derek Wells =

Canadian politician

Derek M. Wells KC

Member of Parliament for South Shore
- In office 1993–1997
- Preceded by: Peter McCreath
- Succeeded by: Gerald Keddy

Personal details
- Born: 28 November 1946 (age 79) Corner Brook, Newfoundland
- Party: Liberal 1993-2021
- Other political affiliations: No Affiliation 2021 – present
- Profession: Businessman, lawyer

Derek M. Wells KC (born 28 November 1946) is a former Canadian politician who served as the Liberal member of Parliament for the riding of South Shore from 1993 to 1997.

== Early life and education ==
Born in Corner Brook, Newfoundland, Wells graduated from Dalhousie Law School in 1972.

== Political career ==
Wells won the South Shore electoral district for the Liberal party in the 1993 federal election. After serving in the 35th Canadian Parliament, Wells was defeated in the 1997 federal election. He unsuccessfully attempted to return to Parliament in the 2000 federal election.

Wells also served as President of the Nova Scotia Liberal Party. He is a partner at Hennigar, Wells, Lamey and Baker in Chester.

Wells announced in September 2009 that he would seek the Liberal Party nomination for South Shore—St. Margaret's in the 2011 federal election. He won the nomination on 4 October. He finished third receiving 17% of the vote.

Wells is the current District 3 municipal councillor in Chester Municipality. He was elected in 2021 during a by-election after the seat was vacated by current Progressive Conservative MLA Danielle Barkhouse.

== Electoral record ==
=== 2021 Chester Municipal By-Election ===
2021 Chester Municipal By-Election District 3
Party	Candidate	Votes	Percent	
No Affiliation	Derek Wells	461	63.67%	✓
No Affiliation	Jo-Ann Grant	164	22.65%	
No Affiliation	Annette Collicut	99	13.67%	

Nova Scotian Municipal politics do not have party affiliations.

=== 2011 federal election ===
2011 Canadian federal election
Party	Candidate	Votes	%	±%	Expenditures
Conservative	Gerald Keddy	17,948	43.14	+7.15	$65,637.06
New Democratic	Gordon Earle	15,033	36.14	+2.79	$79,480.73
Liberal	Derek Wells	7,037	16.92	-6.93	$57,461.22
Green	Kris MacLellan	1,579	3.80	-1.43	$41.21
Total valid votes/Expense limit		41,597	100.0		$86,455.81
Total rejected, unmarked and declined ballots		282	0.67	+0.20	
Turnout		41,879	62.23	+2.03	
Eligible voters		67,296			
Conservative hold		Swing		+2.18	

=== 1997 federal election ===
1997 Canadian federal election
Party	Candidate	Votes	%	±%
Progressive Conservative	Gerald Keddy	14,136	36.00	+3.38
Liberal	Derek Wells	11,397	29.02	-17.92
New Democratic	Blandford Nickerson	8,137	20.72	+15.72
Reform	Anne Matthiasson	5,302	13.50	-0.02
Natural Law	Terry Harnish	298	0.76	-0.02
Total valid votes		39,270	100.00	

=== 1993 federal election ===
1993 Canadian federal election
Party	Candidate	Votes	%	±%
Liberal	Derek Wells	17,351	46.94	+4.37
Progressive Conservative	Peter McCreath	12,058	32.62	-13.84
Reform	Anne Matthiasson	4,999	13.52	
New Democratic	Eric Hustvedt	1,847	5.00	-5.15
National	A. James Donahue	422	1.14	
Natural Law	Richard Robertson	287	0.78	
Total valid votes		36,964	100.00	
