= Bernadette Jordan =

Canadian politician

The Honourable Bernadette Jordan PC
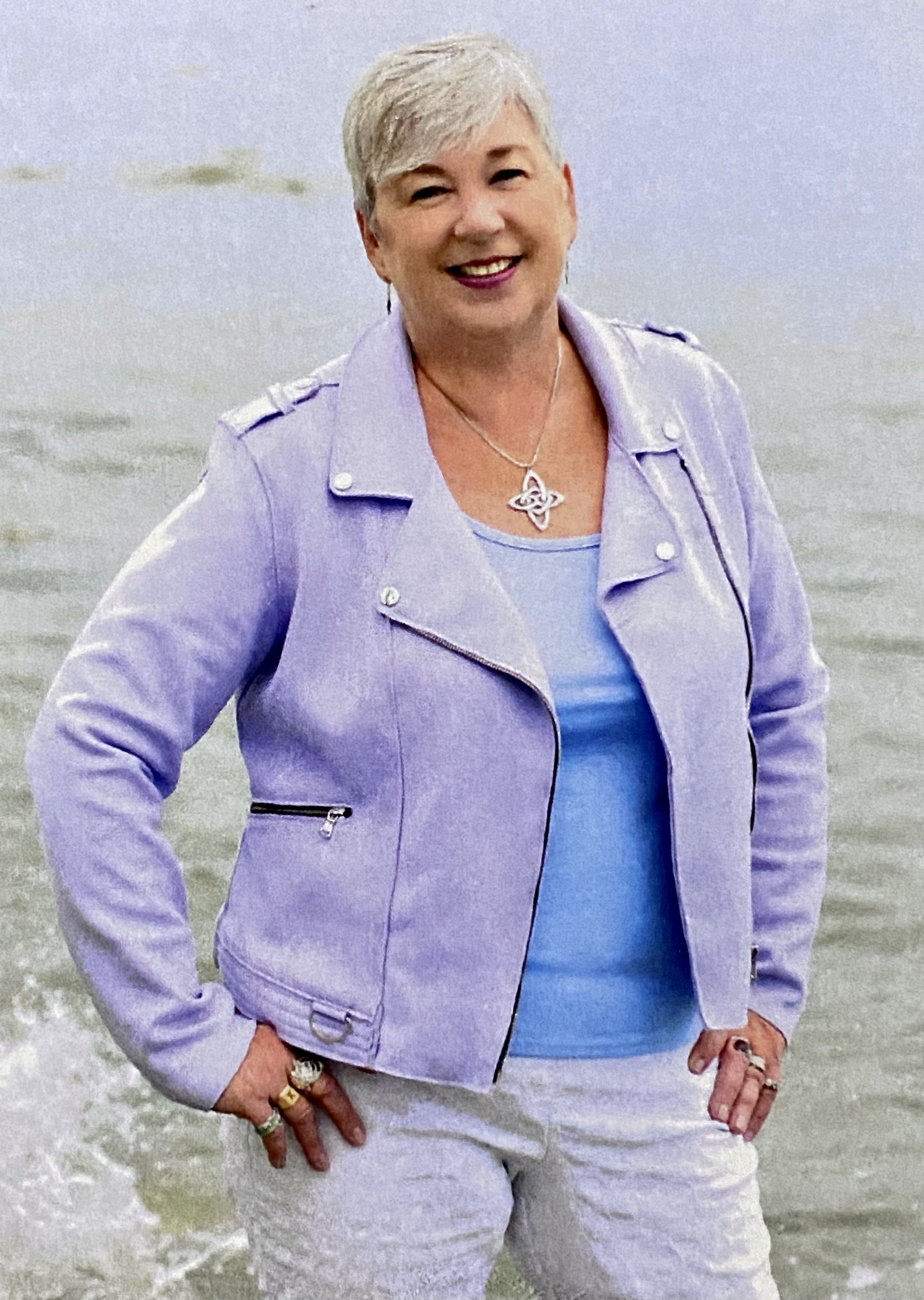
- Jordan in 2021

Consul General of Canada in Boston
- Incumbent
- Assumed office December 4, 2023
- Prime Minister: Justin Trudeau; Mark Carney
- Preceded by: Rodger Cuzner

Minister of Fisheries, Oceans, and the Canadian Coast Guard
- In office November 20, 2019 – October 26, 2021
- Prime Minister: Justin Trudeau
- Preceded by: Jonathan Wilkinson
- Succeeded by: Joyce Murray

Minister of Rural Economic Development
- In office January 14, 2019 – November 20, 2019
- Prime Minister: Justin Trudeau
- Preceded by: Position established
- Succeeded by: Maryam Monsef

Member of Parliament for South Shore—St. Margarets
- In office October 19, 2015 – September 20, 2021
- Preceded by: Gerald Keddy
- Succeeded by: Rick Perkins

Personal details
- Born: April 7, 1963 (age 63) Montreal, Quebec, Canada
- Party: Liberal
- Spouse: David Jordan
- Education: St. Francis Xavier University
- Profession: Development officer

Bernadette Jordan PC (born April 7, 1963) is a Canadian politician who served as Minister of Fisheries, Oceans, and the Canadian Coast Guard from 2019 to 2021. A member of the Liberal Party of Canada, she was elected to represent the riding of South Shore—St. Margarets in the House of Commons in the 2015 and 2019 elections, before being defeated by Rick Perkins in 2021.

== Early life and education ==
Born in Montreal to Scottish immigrants, her family moved to Middle LaHave, Nova Scotia in 1975. She participated in Girl Guides of Canada programs as a Brownie, a Guide, and as an adult volunteer member. Jordan graduated from St. Francis Xavier University in 1984 with a Bachelor of Arts in Political Science.

== Before politics ==
From 2006 to 2014, Jordan worked as a development officer for the Health Services Foundation of the South Shore, where she was in charge of organizing fund raising events for health services foundation.

== Political career ==
She narrowly won the Liberal Party's nomination in the South Shore riding by 22 votes of the 450 cast over Jennifer Naugler, school board chairwoman for the South Shore Regional School Board. Jordan was sworn into the federal cabinet on November 20, 2019, by Prime Minister Justin Trudeau as the Minister of Fisheries, Oceans, and the Canadian Coast Guard, which is responsible for Fisheries and Oceans Canada, and the Canadian Coast Guard. She served as Minister of Rural Economic Development from January until November 2019.

Jordan was defeated in her riding in the 2021 federal election by conservative candidate Rick Perkins.

In 2023, Jordan was named Consul General of Canada in Boston.

=== Environment ===
As Minister of Fisheries, Oceans, and the Canadian Coast Guard, Jorden has committed to protecting ocean habitats from harmful activities, allowing marine ecosystems and species to recover and better withstand the impacts of climate change. As minister Jorden has committed to working towards protecting 30% by 2030. While working towards new ambitious global biodiversity targets under the Convention on Biological Diversity at the 15th Conference of Parties in Kunming, China in 2021.

== Personal life ==
She and her husband, Dave, have three children.

== Electoral record ==
2021 Canadian federal election: South Shore—St. Margarets
Party	Candidate	Votes	%	±%	Expenditures
Conservative	Rick Perkins	20,454	40.90	+12.83	$114,937.56
Liberal	Bernadette Jordan	18,575	37.15	−4.52	$101,389.53
New Democratic	Olivia Dorey	9,541	19.08	+3.16	$21,851.45
Green	Thomas Trappenberg	1,434	2.87	−14.47	$2,256.32
Total valid votes/expense limit		50,004	100.0	—	$115,179.35
Total rejected ballots		400			
Turnout		50,404	63.16	−4.53	
Registered voters		79,797			
Source: Elections Canada

2019 Canadian federal election: South Shore—St. Margarets
Party	Candidate	Votes	%	±%	Expenditures
Liberal	Bernadette Jordan	21,886	41.67	−15.26	$101,013.68
Conservative	Rick Perkins	14,744	28.07	+5.51	$86,186.65
New Democratic	Jessika Hepburn	8,361	15.92	−0.91	none listed
Green	Thomas Trappenberg	6,070	11.56	+8.65	$3,255.40
People's	Robert Monk	667	1.27	New	none listed
Independent	Steven Foster	376	0.72	New	$662.21
Independent	Shawn McMahon	165	0.31	New	$0.00
Veterans Coalition	Jason Matthews	125	0.24	New	none listed
Christian Heritage	Kevin Schulthies	124	0.24	New	$234.83
Total valid votes/expense limit		52,518	100.0		$109,434.66
Total rejected ballots		439	0.83	+0.40	
Turnout		52,957	67.69	−2.14	
Eligible voters		78,238			
Liberal hold		Swing		−10.38	
Source: Elections Canada

2015 Canadian federal election: South Shore—St. Margarets
Party	Candidate	Votes	%	±%	Expenditures
Liberal	Bernadette Jordan	30,045	56.93	+38.97	–
Conservative	Richard Clark	11,905	22.56	–19.42	–
New Democratic	Alex Godbold	8,883	16.83	–19.25	–
Green	Richard Biggar	1,534	2.91	–1.08	–
Independent	Trevor Bruhm	257	0.49	–	–
Communist	Ryan Barry	151	0.20	–	–
Total valid votes/Expense limit		52,775	100.0		$216,554.85
Total rejected ballots		226	0.43	–0.24	
Turnout		53,001	69.83	+7.60	
Eligible voters		75,904			
Liberal gain from Conservative		Swing		+29.20	
Source: Elections Canada

29th Canadian Ministry (2015–2025) – Cabinet of Justin Trudeau
Cabinet posts (2)
Predecessor	Office	Successor
Jonathan Wilkinson	Minister of Fisheries, Oceans and the Canadian Coast Guard; November 20, 2019 – October 26, 2021	Joyce Murray
Position created	Minister of Rural Economic Development; January 14, 2019 – November 20, 2019	Maryam Monsef
