= Jessica Fancy-Landry =

Canadian politician

Jessica Fancy-Landry MP

Member of Parliament for South Shore—St. Margarets
- Incumbent
- Assumed office April 28, 2025
- Preceded by: Rick Perkins

Personal details
- Born: 1983 or 1984 Caledonia, Nova Scotia, Canada
- Party: Liberal
- Education: Memorial University of Newfoundland (MEd)
- Occupation: Politician

Jessica Elizabeth Grace Fancy-Landry MP (born 1983 or 1984) is a Canadian politician. She was elected in South Shore—St. Margarets in the 2025 federal election as a member of the Liberal Party. She defeated incumbent Rick Perkins.

== Early life and education ==
Born and raised in Caledonia, Queens County, she holds two Masters of Education degrees from Memorial University of Newfoundland.

At the time of the 2025 Canadian federal election, she lived in Bridgewater, Nova Scotia.

== Electoral history ==
2025 Canadian federal election: South Shore—St. Margarets
Party	Candidate	Votes	%	±%	Expenditures
Liberal	Jessica Fancy-Landry	27,831	54.88	+19.30	$120,708.39
Conservative	Rick Perkins	20,864	41.14	−2.25	$123,852.88
Green	Mark Embrett	818	1.61	−1.22	$0.00
People's	Patrick Shea Boyd	698	1.38	N/A	$4,786.23
Independent (Note: The New Democratic Party stated that Henderson would represent the NDP, but that due to a late change in the party's candidate, this endorsement could not be registered with Elections Canada.)	Hayden Henderson	500	0.99	N/A	$0.00
Total valid votes/expense limit		50,711	99.26	+0.06	$127,514.63
Total rejected ballots		376	0.74	–0.06	
Turnout		51,087	72.77		
Eligible voters (Note: Number of eligible voters does not include voting day registrations.)		70,205			
Liberal notional gain from Conservative		Swing		+10.78	
Source: Elections Canada
