= Peter McCreath =

Canadian politician

The Honourable Peter McCreath PC

Minister of Veterans Affairs
- In office June 25, 1993 – November 3, 1993
- Prime Minister: Kim Campbell
- Preceded by: Kim Campbell
- Succeeded by: David Collenette

Member of Parliament for South Shore
- In office November 21, 1988 – October 25, 1993
- Preceded by: Lloyd Crouse
- Succeeded by: Derek Wells

Personal details
- Born: July 5, 1943 (age 82) Halifax, Nova Scotia, Canada
- Party: Progressive Conservative
- Profession: Journalist, teacher

Peter L. McCreath, PC (born July 5, 1943) is former chairman of the Nova Scotia Liquor Corporation, President of PMC Communications Inc. and a former Canadian politician.

== Biography ==
A journalist and teacher by training, McCreath was elected to the House of Commons of Canada in the 1988 election as the Progressive Conservative Member of Parliament for the Nova Scotia riding of South Shore. He succeeded longtime MP Lloyd Crouse, who retired after thirty-one years in the House.

In 1991, he became Parliamentary Secretary to the Minister of State for Finance and Privatization. In 1993, he was appointed Parliamentary Secretary to the Minister of Industry, Science and Technology and to the Minister for International Trade.

In the summer of 1993, when Kim Campbell succeeded Brian Mulroney as PC Party leader and Prime Minister of Canada, she appointed McCreath to Cabinet as Minister of Veterans Affairs. However, McCreath's cabinet career was short-lived as both he and the Campbell government were defeated in the subsequent 1993 general election.

Following his defeat, McCreath turned to business, entering the field of public affairs, communications and government relations. After five years with CIBC, he established his own company, PMC Communications Inc.

In 2001, upon the creation of the Nova Scotia Liquor Corporation, McCreath became its chair. He oversaw a period of sustained success for the organization.

McCreath has written several books. He is a co-author of the history textbooks Discovering Canada and Canadian History: Voices and Vision; a biography, The Life & Times of Alexander Keith, Nova Scotia's Brewmaster (2001), A History of Early Nova Scotia (1982 with John G. Leefe), The People's Choice (1995, about his time as an MP), Exquisite Destinations: Adventures of a Maritimer in Lesser-Known Places (2018), From Columbus to Louisbourg: The Colonial Evolution of Atlantic Canada and New England (2020), and Le Loutre: Acadia's Warrior Priest (2021).

== Electoral record ==
1993 Canadian federal election
Party	Candidate	Votes	%	±%
Liberal	Derek Wells	17,351	46.94	+4.37
Progressive Conservative	Peter McCreath	12,058	32.62	-13.84
Reform	Anne Matthiasson	4,999	13.52	
New Democratic	Eric Hustvedt	1,847	5.00	-5.15
National	A. James Donahue	422	1.14	
Natural Law	Richard Robertson	287	0.78	
Total valid votes		36,964	100.00	

1988 Canadian federal election
Party	Candidate	Votes	%	±%
Progressive Conservative	Peter McCreath	18,547	46.46	-10.23
Liberal	Mike Delory	16,995	42.57	13.55
New Democratic	Bill Zimmerman	4,052	10.15	-4.14
Libertarian	David Morgan	329	0.82	
Total valid votes		39,923	100.00	
