= Queens—Lunenburg =

Former federal electoral district in Nova Scotia, Canada

Nova Scotia electoral district

Defunct federal electoral district
- Legislature: House of Commons
- District created: 1924, 1952
- District abolished: 1947, 1966
- First contested: 1925
- Last contested: 1965

Demographics
- Census division(s): Lunenburg, Queens

Queens—Lunenburg was a federal electoral district in the province of Nova Scotia, Canada, that was represented in the House of Commons of Canada from 1925 to 1949 and from 1953 to 1968.

This riding was created in 1924 from parts of Lunenburg and Shelburne and Queen's ridings. It consisted of the counties of Queens and Lunenburg. It was abolished in 1947 when it was redistributed into Lunenburg and Queens—Shelburne ridings.

The district was re-created in 1952 from Lunenburg and Queens—Shelburne, and was abolished in 1966 when it was merged into South Shore riding.

== Members of Parliament ==
This riding elected the following Members of Parliament:

| Parliament | Years | Member | Party |
|---|---|---|---|
Queens—Lunenburg; Riding created from Lunenburg and Shelburne and Queen's
| 15th | 1925–1926 | William Duff | Liberal |
| 16th | 1926–1930 | William Gordon Ernst | Conservative |
| 17th | 1930–1935 | William Gordon Ernst | Conservative |
| 18th | 1935–1940 | John James Kinley | Liberal |
| 19th | 1940–1945 | John James Kinley | Liberal |
| 20th | 1945–1949 | Robert Winters | Liberal |
Riding dissolved into Lunenburg and Queens—Shelburne
Riding re-created from Lunenburg and Queens—Shelburne
| 22nd | 1953–1957 | Robert Winters | Liberal |
| 23rd | 1957–1958 | Lloyd Crouse | Progressive Conservative |
| 24th | 1958–1962 | Lloyd Crouse | Progressive Conservative |
| 25th | 1962–1963 | Lloyd Crouse | Progressive Conservative |
| 26th | 1963–1965 | Lloyd Crouse | Progressive Conservative |
| 27th | 1965–1968 | Lloyd Crouse | Progressive Conservative |
Riding dissolved into South Shore

== Election results ==
=== Queens—Lunenburg, 1925–1949 ===
1925 Canadian federal election
| Party | Candidate | Votes |
|---|---|---|
| Liberal | William Duff | 9,219 |
| Conservative | William Ernst | 8,846 |

1926 Canadian federal election
| Party | Candidate | Votes |
|---|---|---|
| Conservative | William Ernst | 9,925 |
| Liberal | William Duff | 9,136 |

1930 Canadian federal election
| Party | Candidate | Votes |
|---|---|---|
| Conservative | William Ernst | 10,504 |
| Liberal | John Kinley | 9,378 |

1935 Canadian federal election
| Party | Candidate | Votes |
|---|---|---|
| Liberal | KINLEY, John James | 10,238 |
| Conservative | ERNST, Hon. William Gordon | 9,500 |

1940 Canadian federal election
| Party | Candidate | Votes |
|---|---|---|
| Liberal | KINLEY, John James | 10,616 |
| National Government | LEVY, Robert Clifford | 7,845 |
| Co-operative Commonwealth | VAN BUSKIRK, Claude | 457 |

1945 Canadian federal election
| Party | Candidate | Votes |
|---|---|---|
| Liberal | WINTERS, Robert Henry | 9,693 |
| Progressive Conservative | BEACH, Leaman Clyde | 8,562 |
| Co-operative Commonwealth | NICHOLSON, John William Angus | 1,295 |

=== Queens—Lunenburg, 1953–1968 ===
1953 Canadian federal election
| Party | Candidate | Votes |
|---|---|---|
| Liberal | WINTERS, Hon. Robert Henry | 13,053 |
| Progressive Conservative | RHODENIZER, Frederick LeRoy | 10,067 |

1957 Canadian federal election
| Party | Candidate | Votes |
|---|---|---|
| Progressive Conservative | CROUSE, Lloyd R. | 12,372 |
| Liberal | WINTERS, Robert H. | 12,098 |

1958 Canadian federal election
| Party | Candidate | Votes |
|---|---|---|
| Progressive Conservative | CROUSE, Lloyd R. | 14,156 |
| Liberal | MACLEOD, James A. | 10,594 |

1962 Canadian federal election
| Party | Candidate | Votes |
|---|---|---|
| Progressive Conservative | CROUSE, Lloyd R. | 12,847 |
| Liberal | JAMES, Arthur A. | 10,489 |
| New Democratic | O'BRIEN, Allan | 593 |

1963 Canadian federal election
| Party | Candidate | Votes |
|---|---|---|
| Progressive Conservative | CROUSE, Lloyd R. | 12,591 |
| Liberal | BURKE, Archibald | 11,357 |

1965 Canadian federal election
| Party | Candidate | Votes |
|---|---|---|
| Progressive Conservative | CROUSE, Lloyd R. | 13,556 |
| Liberal | PUBLICOVER, Ernest F. | 9,193 |
| New Democratic | VAUGHAN, Malcolm James | 744 |

== See also ==
- List of Canadian electoral districts
- Historical federal electoral districts of Canada
