= Angus Elderkin =

Canadian politician

Member of Parliament for Annapolis—Kings
- In office June 1949 – June 1950
- Preceded by: riding created
- Succeeded by: George Nowlan

Personal details
- Born: Angus Alexander Elderkin; 18 June 1896 Wolfville, Nova Scotia, Canada
- Died: May 22, 1985 (aged 88) Wolfville, Nova Scotia, Canada
- Party: Liberal
- Profession: farmer, fruit grower

Angus Alexander Elderkin (18 June 1896 – 22 May 1985) was a Canadian farmer and politician. Elderkin was a Liberal party member of the House of Commons of Canada. He was born in Wolfville, Nova Scotia and became a farmer and fruit grower by career.

He was first elected to Parliament at the Annapolis—Kings riding in the 1949 general election, but that vote was declared invalid by the Nova Scotia Supreme Court after Progressive Conservative party candidate George Nowlan complained that some votes from military personnel were mistakenly counted for Annapolis—Kings when those votes should have applied to the home ridings of military service voters. A by-election was held on 19 June 1950 in which Nowlan defeated Elderkin.

Elderkin made one more unsuccessful attempt to return to the House of Commons in the 1958 federal election where the riding since became Digby—Annapolis—Kings, however was defeated by Nowlan on that occasion. He died at a hospital at the age of 88 in his hometown of Wolfville in 1985. His cremated remains were entombed at Willowbank Cemetery in Wolfville.
