= Havelock, Nova Scotia =

Community in Nova Scotia, Canada

Coordinates: 44°18′19.08″N 65°55′13.34″W

Havelock in Nova Scotia

Havelock is a community in the Canadian province of Nova Scotia, located in Digby County. The community is named after Sir Henry Havelock.
