= Vincent Pottier =

Canadian politician

Member of Parliament for Shelburne—Yarmouth—Clare
- In office 14 October 1935 – 11 June 1945

Personal details
- Born: Vincent-Joseph Pottier; 11 April 1897 Belleville, Nova Scotia, Canada
- Died: 4 February 1980 (aged 82) Halifax, Nova Scotia, Canada
- Party: Liberal
- Spouse(s): 1. Kathryn LeBlanc (died); 2. Helena McKinlay; m. 10 August 1928
- Profession: barrister, judge

Vincent-Joseph Pottier (11 April 1897 – 4 February 1980) was a Liberal party member of the House of Commons of Canada. He was the first Acadian from Nova Scotia elected to the House of Commons and the first Acadian to serve on the Nova Scotia Supreme Court.

== Early life and education ==
He was born in Belleville, Nova Scotia to Augustin and Rose Emma Pothier. He graduated from Dalhousie Law School in 1920 and was a barrister by trade.

== Political career ==
Pottier served as a school commissioner and town councillor.

He was first elected to Parliament at the Shelburne—Yarmouth—Clare riding in the 1935 general election, the first Acadian from Nova Scotia to join the House of Commons. He was re-elected in 1940. After completing his second term, the 19th Canadian Parliament, Pottier did not seek further re-election in 1945.

== Judicial career ==
In 1947, Pottier was appointed a judge at County Court number 1 in Halifax. On 4 January 1965, he became the first Acadian appointed to the Nova Scotia Supreme Court, serving in that role until his retirement after five years in May 1970. In his final years, he donated his time supporting the Dalhousie Legal Aid Service.

== Electoral history ==
1935 Canadian federal election
Party	Candidate	Votes
Liberal	Vincent Joseph Pottier	11,102
Conservative	René-Wilfrid-Emilien Landry	5,086
Reconstruction	James Donald Burton	1,594

1940 Canadian federal election
Party	Candidate	Votes
Liberal	Vincent-Joseph Pottier	10,851
National Government	James Marven Walker	6,569
