= Thomas Andrew Murray Kirk =

Canadian politician

Member of Parliament for Shelburne—Yarmouth—Clare Digby—Yarmouth (1949–1953)
- In office June 1949 – March 1958
- Preceded by: riding created
- Succeeded by: Felton Legere

Personal details
- Born: Thomas Andrew Murray Kirk; 17 January 1906 Yarmouth, Nova Scotia, Canada
- Died: 10 August 1966 (aged 60) Kentville, Nova Scotia, Canada
- Party: Liberal
- Profession: administrator, teacher

Thomas Andrew Murray Kirk (17 January 1906 – 10 August 1966) was a Liberal party member of the House of Commons of Canada. Born in Yarmouth, Nova Scotia, he was an administrator and teacher by career.

He was first elected at the Digby—Yarmouth riding in the 1949 general election after local Liberal party members chose him as their candidate. After a redistribution of electoral districts, Kirk was re-elected for successive terms at Shelburne—Yarmouth—Clare in 1953 and 1957. He was defeated in the 1958 election by Felton Legere of the Progressive Conservative Party.

In 1952 Kirk was a Canadian delegate to the Seventh General Conference of UNESCO in Paris.

Kirk died at the Kentville Sanitorium in the evening of 10 August 1966, aged 60.
