= Pinkneys Point, Nova Scotia =

Community in Nova Scotia, Canada

Coordinates: 43°42′54″N 66°3′53″W

Pinkneys Point in Nova Scotia

Pinkneys Point is a small community in the Canadian province of Nova Scotia, located in Yarmouth County. It is almost an island but is connected by a 2 km stretch of road winding through large salt water marshes. It is a symbol of isolation in Nova Scotia as there are no services along the road or in the community. The population is approximately 300 people, who make their living from fishing.

It is an attractive port for fishers because of its relative proximity to fishing grounds.
