= Digby—Annapolis—Kings =

Former federal electoral district in Nova Scotia, Canada

Nova Scotia electoral district

Defunct federal electoral district
- Legislature: House of Commons
- District created: 1952
- District abolished: 1966
- First contested: 1953
- Last contested: 1965

Digby—Annapolis—Kings was a federal electoral district in the province of Nova Scotia, Canada, that was represented in the House of Commons of Canada from 1935 to 1949, and from 1953 to 1968.

This riding was created in 1933 from parts of Digby—Annapolis and Hants—Kings ridings. It consisted of the counties of Kings and Annapolis and the county of Digby excluding the municipality of Clare. The district was abolished in 1947 when it was redistributed between Annapolis—Kings and Digby—Yarmouth ridings.

The district was created again in 1952 from Annapolis—Kings and Digby—Yarmouth. It consisted of the counties of Kings and Annapolis and the county of Digby excluding the Municipality of Clare. It was abolished in 1966 when it was redistributed between Annapolis Valley and South Western Nova ridings.

== Members of Parliament ==
This riding elected the following members of Parliament:

Parliament	Years	Member	Party
Digby—Annapolis—Kings; Riding created from Digby—Annapolis and Hants—Kings
18th	1935–1940	James Lorimer Ilsley	Liberal
19th	1940–1945	James Lorimer Ilsley	Liberal
20th	1945–1948	James Lorimer Ilsley	Liberal
20th	1948–1949	George Nowlan	Progressive Conservative
Riding dissolved into Annapolis—Kings and Digby—Yarmouth
Riding re-created from Annapolis—Kings and Digby—Yarmouth
22nd	1953–1957	George Nowlan	Progressive Conservative
23rd	1957–1958	George Nowlan	Progressive Conservative
24th	1958–1962	George Nowlan	Progressive Conservative
25th	1962–1963	George Nowlan	Progressive Conservative
26th	1963–1965	George Nowlan	Progressive Conservative
27th	1965–1968	Pat Nowlan	Progressive Conservative
Riding dissolved into Annapolis Valley and South Western Nova

== Election results ==
=== 1935–1949 ===
1935 Canadian federal election
Party	Candidate	Votes	%
Liberal	James Lorimer Ilsley	13,894	60.59
Conservative	Caldwell Stewart	7,266	31.68
Reconstruction	Cyril B. Wetmore	1,773	7.73

1940 Canadian federal election
Party	Candidate	Votes	%	±%
Liberal	James Lorimer Ilsley	15,094	61.33	+0.74
National Government	Hiram Thomas	9,518	38.67	+6.99

1945 Canadian federal election
Party	Candidate	Votes	%	±%
Liberal	James Lorimer Ilsley	14,445	55.68	-5.75
Progressive Conservative	Hiram Thomas	9,885	38.10	-0.57
Co-operative Commonwealth	Cecil Hambly Hansford	1,252	4.83	
Farmer–Labour	Roscoe Alfred Fillmore	362	1.40	

Canadian federal by-election, 13 December 1948
Party	Candidate	Votes	%	±%
On Mr. Ilsley's resignation, 27 October 1948
Progressive Conservative	George Clyde Nowlan	14,057	49.29	+11.19
Liberal	John Douglas McKenzie	12,469	43.72	-11.96
Co-operative Commonwealth	Lloyd R. Shaw	1,992	6.99	+2.15

=== 1953–1968 ===
1953 Canadian federal election
Party	Candidate	Votes	%	±%
Progressive Conservative	George Clyde Nowlan	16,422	51.63	+2.34
Liberal	Eric Wilfred Balcom	15,387	48.37	+4.62

1957 Canadian federal election
Party	Candidate	Votes	%	±%
Progressive Conservative	George Clyde Nowlan	18,534	58.01	+6.38
Liberal	Arthur Laurence Morfee	13,417	41.99	-6.38

1958 Canadian federal election
Party	Candidate	Votes	%	±%
Progressive Conservative	George Clyde Nowlan	19,432	58.16	+0.15
Liberal	Angus A. Elderkin	13,981	41.84	-0.15

1962 Canadian federal election
Party	Candidate	Votes	%	±%
Progressive Conservative	George Clyde Nowlan	17,499	52.68	-5.48
Liberal	Joseph Edward Steadman	14,511	43.68	+1.84
New Democratic	Murray Alton Bent	803	2.42	
Social Credit	Granville B. Thompson	456	1.37	

1963 Canadian federal election
Party	Candidate	Votes	%	±%
Progressive Conservative	George Clyde Nowlan	16,887	49.76	-2.92
Liberal	John Elvin Shaffner	16,471	48.53	+4.75
New Democratic	Murray Alton Bent	579	1.71	-0.71

1965 Canadian federal election
Party	Candidate	Votes	%	±%
Progressive Conservative	John Patrick Nowlan	17,845	53.22	+3.46
Liberal	John Elvin Shaffner	14,636	43.65	-4.88
New Democratic	George W. Turner	1,049	3.13	+1.42

== See also ==
- List of Canadian electoral districts
- Historical federal electoral districts of Canada
