= Robert Winters =

Canadian electrical engineer, army officer, politician and businessman

The Honourable Robert Winters PC
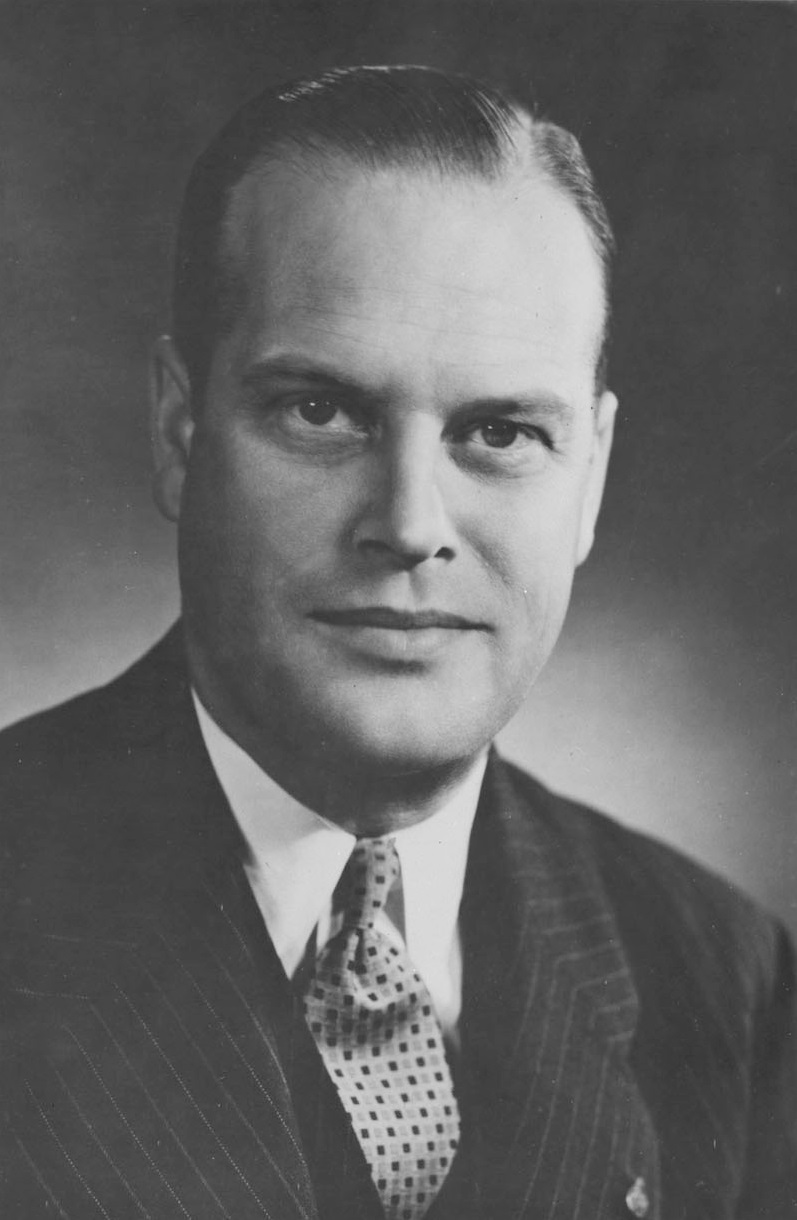
- Winters, c. 1942-48

Minister of Trade and Commerce
- In office January 4, 1966 – March 29, 1968
- Prime Minister: Lester B. Pearson
- Preceded by: Mitchell Sharp
- Succeeded by: Jean-Luc Pepin (acting)

Minister of Public Works
- In office September 7, 1953 – June 20, 1957
- Prime Minister: Louis St. Laurent
- Preceded by: Walter Harris (acting)
- Succeeded by: Howard Charles Green

Minister of Resources and Development
- In office January 18, 1950 – September 16, 1953
- Prime Minister: Louis St. Laurent
- Preceded by: Office established
- Succeeded by: Jean Lesage

Minister of Reconstruction and Supply
- In office November 15, 1948 – January 17, 1950
- Prime Minister: Louis St. Laurent
- Preceded by: C. D. Howe
- Succeeded by: Office abolished

Member of Parliament for York West
- In office November 8, 1965 – June 24, 1968
- Preceded by: Red Kelly
- Succeeded by: Philip Givens

Member of Parliament for Queens--Lunenburg (Lunenburg; 1949–1953) (Queens--Lunenburg; 1945–1949)
- In office June 11, 1945 – June 10, 1957
- Preceded by: John James Kinley
- Succeeded by: Lloyd Crouse

Personal details
- Born: Robert Henry Winters; August 18, 1910 Lunenburg, Nova Scotia, Canada
- Died: October 10, 1969 (aged 59) Monterey, California, U.S.
- Party: Liberal
- Spouse: Eleanor McRobie (m. 1936)
- Children: 2
- Education: Mount Allison University (BA); Massachusetts Institute of Technology (MSc)
- Profession: Engineer

Military service
- Allegiance: Canada
- Branch/service: Canadian Army
- Years of service: 1939–1945
- Rank: Lieutenant-colonel
- Unit: Royal Canadian Electrical and Mechanical Engineers
- Battles/wars: World War II

Robert Henry Winters PC (August 18, 1910 – October 10, 1969) was a Canadian politician and businessman.

== Life and career ==
Born in Lunenburg, Nova Scotia, the son of a fishing captain, Winters went to Mount Allison University in New Brunswick, and then to the Massachusetts Institute of Technology to complete his degree in electrical engineering. He worked for Northern Electric before joining the army in World War II, eventually becoming a lieutenant-colonel. He was first elected to the House of Commons in the 1945 general election as a Liberal for the riding of Queens—Lunenburg in Nova Scotia. Winters was appointed to Cabinet in 1948, and served as minister of public works, among other portfolios, under Prime Minister Louis St. Laurent.

Defeated along with the St. Laurent government in the 1957 election, Winters entered the corporate world, becoming a chief executive officer at a series of companies. He was hired as a special advisor to the Newfoundland government to help negotiate the Churchill Falls deal, for which he became highly popular in that province.

He was persuaded to return to politics by Lester Pearson, and won the Toronto seat of York West in the 1965 election, becoming minister of trade and commerce in Pearson's government. He was seen as close to the business community and far more fiscally conservative than Walter L. Gordon, but was also a proponent of social reform; strongly believing in the ability of government to bring about social justice.

He originally announced that he would not seek to replace the retiring Pearson, but changed his mind and ran to succeed Pearson at the 1968 Liberal leadership convention, coming in second to Pierre Trudeau.

Winters then left politics, to become president and director of Brazilian Light and Power and a vice president of CIBC. Also, he was very involved in the new York University and served as the first chair of its board of governors.

== Death ==
In 1969, while in California, he suffered a severe heart attack during a game of tennis. He died at age 59 in an ambulance on his way to a hospital.

Winters College at York University is named in his honour.

== Electoral record ==
1965 Canadian federal election: York West
Party	Candidate	Votes	%	±%
Liberal	Robert H. Winters	43,807	47.7	-3.7
Progressive Conservative	George Hogan	27,071	29.5	-0.9
New Democratic	Martha Brewin	20,993	22.9	+5.5
Total valid votes		91,871	100.0	

1957 Canadian federal election: Queens—Lunenburg
Party	Candidate	Votes
Progressive Conservative	CROUSE, Lloyd R.	12,372
Liberal	WINTERS, Robert H.	12,098

1953 Canadian federal election: Queens—Lunenburg
Party	Candidate	Votes
Liberal	WINTERS, Hon. Robert Henry	13,053
Progressive Conservative	RHODENIZER, Frederick LeRoy	10,067

1949 Canadian federal election: Lunenburg
Party	Candidate	Votes
Liberal	Robert Henry Winters	8,829
Progressive Conservative	Melbourne Morton Gardner	7,527
Co-operative Commonwealth	George Herbert Crouse	574

1945 Canadian federal election: Queens—Lunenburg
Party	Candidate	Votes
Liberal	WINTERS, Robert Henry	9,693
Progressive Conservative	BEACH, Leaman Clyde	8,562
Co-operative Commonwealth	NICHOLSON, John William Angus	1,295

Parliament of Canada
Preceded by Clarence Decatur Howe	Minister of Reconstruction and Supply; 1948–1950	Succeeded by The office of Minister of Reconstruction and Supply was abolished.
Preceded by None	Minister of Resources and Development; 1950–1953	Succeeded by Jean Lesage
Preceded by Mitchell William Sharp	Minister of Trade and Commerce; 1966–1968	Succeeded by Jean-Luc Pepin (acting)
