= Donald Smith (politician) =

Canadian politician

Member of Parliament for Queens—Shelburne
- In office June 1949 – June 1953
- Preceded by: riding created
- Succeeded by: riding dissolved

Senator for Queens-Shelburne division
- In office July 1955 – July 1980

Personal details
- Born: 7 July 1905 Liverpool, Nova Scotia
- Died: 7 May 1985 (aged 79)
- Party: Liberal
- Spouse(s): Beth Morton m. 18 September 1929
- Profession: Dentist

Donald Smith (7 July 1905 – 7 May 1985) was a Liberal party member of the House of Commons of Canada. He was born in Liverpool, Nova Scotia.

He became a dentist, with education from Mount Allison University and Dalhousie University. He attained a DDS degree by 1928.

From 1935 to 1939, Smith served as a municipal councillor for Liverpool, Nova Scotia.

He was first elected to Parliament at the Queens—Shelburne riding in the 1949 general election. He was the riding's only member, as the electoral district was created in 1947 and the changes undone in 1952. Smith did not seek another Parliamentary term in the 1953 election. On 28 July 1955, he was appointed to the Senate and remained in that capacity until 7 July 1980.

Smith's father was Jordan W. Smith, a member of Nova Scotia's provincial legislature from 1911 to 1925. Richard Hunt, another member of the Nova Scotia legislature, was Donald Smith's grandfather.
