= Digby—Yarmouth =

Former federal electoral district in Nova Scotia, Canada

Nova Scotia electoral district

Defunct federal electoral district
- Legislature: House of Commons
- District created: 1947
- District abolished: 1952
- First contested: 1949
- Last contested: 1949

Digby—Yarmouth was a federal electoral district in the province of Nova Scotia, Canada, that was represented in the House of Commons of Canada from 1949 to 1953.

This riding was created in 1947 from parts of Digby—Annapolis—Kings and Shelburne—Yarmouth—Clare ridings. It consisted of the counties of Digby and Yarmouth. It was abolished in 1952 when it was redistributed into Digby—Annapolis—Kings and Shelburne—Yarmouth—Clare ridings.

Its only Member of Parliament was Thomas Andrew Murray Kirk of the Liberal Party of Canada.

== Members of Parliament ==
This riding has elected the following members of Parliament:

Parliament	Years	Member	Party
Digby—Yarmouth; Riding created from Digby—Annapolis—Kings and Shelburne—Yarmouth—Clare
21st	1949–1953	Thomas Andrew Murray Kirk	Liberal
Riding dissolved into Digby—Annapolis—Kings and Shelburne—Yarmouth—Clare

== Election results ==
1949 Canadian federal election
Party	Candidate	Votes
Liberal	Thomas Andrew Murray Kirk	11,084
Progressive Conservative	Donald Farish Filleul	9,505

== See also ==
- List of Canadian electoral districts
- Historical federal electoral districts of Canada
