= Queens—Shelburne (federal electoral district) =

Former federal electoral district in Nova Scotia, Canada

Nova Scotia electoral district

Defunct federal electoral district
- Legislature: House of Commons
- District created: 1947
- District abolished: 1952
- First contested: 1949
- Last contested: 1949

Queens—Shelburne was a federal electoral district in the province of Nova Scotia, Canada, that was represented in the House of Commons of Canada from 1949 to 1953.

This riding was created in 1947 from Queens—Lunenburg and Shelburne—Yarmouth—Clare ridings. It consisted of the counties of Queens and Shelburne. It was abolished in 1952 when it was redistributed back into those districts.

Its only Member of Parliament was Donald Smith of the Liberal Party of Canada.

== Members of Parliament ==
This riding elected the following members of Parliament:

Parliament	Years	Member	Party
Queens—Shelburne; Riding created from Queens—Lunenburg and Shelburne—Yarmouth—Clare
21st	1949–1953	Donald Smith	Liberal
Riding dissolved into Queens—Lunenburg and Shelburne—Yarmouth—Clare

== Election results ==
1949 Canadian federal election
Party	Candidate	Votes
Liberal	Donald Smith	6,501
Progressive Conservative	Hubert Granville Nickerson	6,282
Co-operative Commonwealth	G.W. Claude Vanbuskirk	389

== See also ==
- List of Canadian electoral districts
- Historical federal electoral districts of Canada
