= Frederick Thomas Armstrong =

Canadian politician

Member of Parliament for Shelburne—Yarmouth—Clare
- In office 1963–1965
- Preceded by: Felton Legere
- Succeeded by: John Oates Bower

Personal details
- Born: November 19, 1907 Bell Neck, Nova Scotia, Canada
- Died: November 2, 1990 (aged 82)
- Party: Liberal
- Profession: automobile dealer, office manager, real estate agent

Frederick Thomas Armstrong (November 19, 1907 in Bell Neck, Nova Scotia, Canada – November 2, 1990) was a Canadian politician, automobile dealer, office manager and real estate agent. He was elected to the House of Commons of Canada in 1963 as a Member of the Liberal Party to represent the riding of Shelburne—Yarmouth—Clare. He also ran in the elections of 1962 and 1965 but lost both.
