= South Shore—St. Margarets =

Federal electoral district in Nova Scotia, Canada

Nova Scotia electoral district
- Interactive map of riding boundaries from the 2025 federal election

Federal electoral district
- Legislature: House of Commons
MP
Jessica Fancy-Landry
Liberal
- District created: 1966
- First contested: 1968
- Last contested: 2025
- District webpage: profile, map

Demographics
- Population (2016): 91,830
- Electors (2025): 69,830
- Area (km²): 8,475
- Pop. density (per km²): 10.8
- Census division(s): HRM, Lunenburg County, Queens County, Shelburne County
- Census subdivision(s): Halifax (part), Lunenburg, Chester, Queens, Bridgewater, Barrington, Shelburne, Lunenburg, Shelburne, Mahone Bay

South Shore—St. Margarets (formerly South Shore—St. Margaret's and South Shore) is a federal electoral district in Nova Scotia, Canada, that has been represented in the House of Commons of Canada since 1968. It covers the South Shore region of Nova Scotia.

== Demographics ==
Historical population
Year	Pop.	±%
2001	83,694	—
2006	82,855	−1.0%
2011 (2003 redist.)	82,254	−0.7%
2011 (2013 redist.)	92,561	+12.5%
2016	91,830	−0.8%

From the 2006 census

Ethnic groups:

- White: 97.1%
- First Nations: 1.5%
- Black: 0.6%

Languages:

- English: 96.9%
- French: 1.2%
- German: 0.6%
- Other: 1.1%

Religions:

- Protestant: 71.5%
- Catholic: 11.5%
- Other Christian: 1.1%
- No affiliation: 15.4%

Education:

- No certificate, diploma or degree: 34.5%
- High school certificate: 21.2%
- Apprenticeship or trade certificate or diploma: 12.2%
- Community college, CEGEP or other non-university certificate or diploma: 17.4%
- University certificate or diploma: 14.7%

== Geography ==
It consists of the counties of Shelburne, Queens and Lunenburg; and the western part of the Halifax Regional Municipality

== History ==
It was created in 1966 mostly from Queens—Lunenburg and Shelburne—Yarmouth—Clare. In 2003, the district added portions of Halifax West.

After the 2012 federal electoral redistribution, the riding gained 11% of its new territory from Halifax West.

== Members of Parliament ==
This riding has elected the following members of Parliament:

Parliament	Years	Member	Party
South Shore; Riding created from Queens—Lunenburg and Shelburne—Yarmouth—Clare
28th	1968–1972	Lloyd Crouse	Progressive Conservative
29th	1972–1974	Lloyd Crouse	Progressive Conservative
30th	1974–1979	Lloyd Crouse	Progressive Conservative
31st	1979–1980	Lloyd Crouse	Progressive Conservative
32nd	1980–1984	Lloyd Crouse	Progressive Conservative
33rd	1984–1988	Lloyd Crouse	Progressive Conservative
34th	1988–1993	Peter McCreath	Progressive Conservative
35th	1993–1997	Derek Wells	Liberal
36th	1997–2000	Gerald Keddy	Progressive Conservative
37th	2000–2003	Gerald Keddy	Progressive Conservative
37th	2003–2004	Gerald Keddy	Conservative
South Shore—St. Margaret's
38th	2004–2006	Gerald Keddy	Conservative
39th	2006–2008	Gerald Keddy	Conservative
40th	2008–2011	Gerald Keddy	Conservative
41st	2011–2015	Gerald Keddy	Conservative
South Shore—St. Margarets
42nd	2015–2019	Bernadette Jordan	Liberal
43rd	2019–2021	Bernadette Jordan	Liberal
44th	2021–2025	Rick Perkins	Conservative
45th	2025–present	Jessica Fancy-Landry	Liberal

== Election results ==
=== South Shore—St. Margarets ===
==== 2025 ====
2025 Canadian federal election
Party	Candidate	Votes	%	±%	Expenditures
Liberal	Jessica Fancy-Landry	27,831	54.88	+19.30	$120,708.39
Conservative	Rick Perkins	20,864	41.14	−2.25	$123,852.88
Green	Mark Embrett	818	1.61	−1.22	$0.00
People's	Patrick Shea Boyd	698	1.38	N/A	$4,786.23
Independent (Note: The New Democratic Party stated that Henderson would represent the NDP, but that due to a late change in the party's candidate, this endorsement could not be registered with Elections Canada.)	Hayden Henderson	500	0.99	N/A	$0.00
Total valid votes/expense limit		50,711	99.26	+0.06	$127,514.63
Total rejected ballots		376	0.74	–0.06	
Turnout		51,087	72.77		
Eligible voters (Note: Number of eligible voters does not include voting day registrations.)		70,205			
Liberal notional gain from Conservative		Swing		+10.78	
Source: Elections Canada

==== 2021 ====
2021 federal election redistributed results
Party	Vote	%
Conservative	18,044	43.39
Liberal	14,794	35.58
New Democratic	7,568	18.20
Green	1,176	2.83

2021 Canadian federal election
Party	Candidate	Votes	%	±%	Expenditures
Conservative	Rick Perkins	20,454	40.90	+12.83	$114,937.56
Liberal	Bernadette Jordan	18,575	37.15	−4.52	$101,389.53
New Democratic	Olivia Dorey	9,541	19.08	+3.16	$21,851.45
Green	Thomas Trappenberg	1,434	2.87	−14.47	$2,256.32
Total valid votes/expense limit		50,004	100.0	—	$115,179.35
Total rejected ballots		400			
Turnout		50,404	63.16	−4.53	
Registered voters		79,797			
Source: Elections Canada

==== 2019 ====
2019 Canadian federal election
Party	Candidate	Votes	%	±%	Expenditures
Liberal	Bernadette Jordan	21,886	41.67	−15.26	$101,013.68
Conservative	Rick Perkins	14,744	28.07	+5.51	$86,186.65
New Democratic	Jessika Hepburn	8,361	15.92	−0.91	none listed
Green	Thomas Trappenberg	6,070	11.56	+8.65	$3,255.40
People's	Robert Monk	667	1.27	New	none listed
Independent	Steven Foster	376	0.72	New	$662.21
Independent	Shawn McMahon	165	0.31	New	$0.00
Veterans Coalition	Jason Matthews	125	0.24	New	none listed
Christian Heritage	Kevin Schulthies	124	0.24	New	$234.83
Total valid votes/expense limit		52,518	100.0		$109,434.66
Total rejected ballots		439	0.83	+0.40	
Turnout		52,957	67.69	−2.14	
Eligible voters		78,238			
Liberal hold		Swing		−10.38	
Source: Elections Canada

==== 2015 ====
2015 Canadian federal election
Party	Candidate	Votes	%	±%	Expenditures
Liberal	Bernadette Jordan	30,045	56.93	+38.97	$74,989.98
Conservative	Richard Clark	11,905	22.56	–19.42	$77,116.91
New Democratic	Alex Godbold	8,883	16.83	–19.24	$119,217.64
Green	Richard Biggar	1,534	2.91	–1.09	$126.74
Independent	Trevor Bruhm	257	0.49	–	$1,450.37
Communist	Ryan Barry	151	0.20	–	–
Total valid votes/Expense limit		52,775	100.00		$217,269.80
Total rejected ballots		226	0.43		
Turnout		53,001	69.83		
Eligible voters		75,904			
Liberal gain from Conservative		Swing		+29.20	
Source: Elections Canada

2011 federal election redistributed results
Party	Vote	%
Conservative	19,709	41.98
New Democratic	16,939	36.08
Liberal	8,431	17.96
Green	1,875	3.99

=== South Shore—St. Margaret's ===
==== 2011 ====
2011 Canadian federal election
Party	Candidate	Votes	%	±%	Expenditures
Conservative	Gerald Keddy	17,948	43.14	+7.15	$65,637.06
New Democratic	Gordon Earle	15,033	36.14	+2.79	$79,480.73
Liberal	Derek Wells	7,037	16.92	−6.93	$57,461.22
Green	Kris MacLellan	1,579	3.80	−1.43	$41.21
Total valid votes/Expense limit		41,597	100.0		$86,455.81
Total rejected, unmarked and declined ballots		282	0.67	+0.20	
Turnout		41,879	62.23	+2.03	
Eligible voters		67,296			
Conservative hold		Swing		+2.18	

==== 2008 ====
2008 Canadian federal election
Party	Candidate	Votes	%	±%	Expenditures
Conservative	Gerald Keddy	14,388	35.99	−0.79	$64,451.93
New Democratic	Gordon Earle	13,456	33.65	+5.20	$80,797.19
Liberal	Bill Smith	9,536	23.85	−4.64	$54,540.83
Green	Michael Oddy	2,090	5.23	+2.32	$105.90
Christian Heritage	Joseph Larkin	513	1.28	−2.08	$1,140.54
Total valid votes/Expense limit		39,983	100.0		$83,679
Total rejected, unmarked and declined ballots		190	0.47	+0.05	
Turnout		40,173	60.20	−0.36	
Eligible voters		66,733			
Conservative hold		Swing		−3.00	

==== 2006 ====
2006 Canadian federal election
Party	Candidate	Votes	%	±%	Expenditures
Conservative	Gerald Keddy	15,108	36.85	−1.05	$54,773.43
New Democratic	Gordon Earle	11,689	28.51	+2.81	$40,850.21
Liberal	Darian Huskilson	11,629	28.36	−3.72	$40,530.60
Christian Heritage	James Hnatiuk	1,376	3.36	–	$8,815.18
Green	Kate Morris Boudreau	1,198	2.92	−1.39	$2,624.42
Total valid votes/Expense limit		41,000	100.0		$78,403
Total rejected, unmarked and declined ballots		173	0.42		
Turnout		41,173	60.56	+0.04	
Eligible voters		67,983			
Conservative hold		Swing		−1.93	

==== 2004 ====
2004 Canadian federal election
Party	Candidate	Votes	%	±%	Expenditures
Conservative	Gerald Keddy	14,954	37.90	−12.58	$55,398.71
Liberal	John Chandler	12,658	32.08	−3.04	$47,623.99
New Democratic	Gordon Earle	10,140	25.70	+11.33	$40,934.28
Green	Kate Boudreau	1,700	4.31	–	$1,478.43
Total valid votes/Expense limit		39,452	100.0		$75,387
Total rejected, unmarked and declined ballots		182	0.46		
Turnout		39,634	60.52	−1.08	
Eligible voters		65,487			
Conservative notional gain from Progressive Conservative		Swing		−4.77	
Changes from 2000 are based on redistributed results. Change for the Conservative Party is based on the combined totals of the Progressive Conservative Party and the Canadian Alliance.

2000 federal election redistributed results
Party	Vote	%
Progressive Conservative	15,083	37.89
Liberal	13,979	35.12
New Democratic	5,718	14.37
Alliance	5,013	12.59
Others	12	0.03

=== South Shore ===
==== 2000 ====
2000 Canadian federal election
Party	Candidate	Votes	%	±%
Progressive Conservative	Gerald Keddy	14,328	39.69	3.70
Liberal	Derek Wells	12,677	35.12	6.10
Alliance	Evan Walters	4,697	13.01	−0.49
New Democratic	Bill Zimmerman	4,394	12.17	−8.55
Total rejected, unmarked and declined ballots		192	0.5	
Turnout		36,096	61.47	
Eligible voters		58,726		

==== 1997 ====
1997 Canadian federal election
Party	Candidate	Votes	%	±%
Progressive Conservative	Gerald Keddy	14,136	36.00	+3.38
Liberal	Derek Wells	11,397	29.02	−17.92
New Democratic	Blandford Nickerson	8,137	20.72	+15.72
Reform	Anne Matthiasson	5,302	13.50	−0.02
Natural Law	Terry Harnish	298	0.76	−0.02
Total valid votes		39,270	100.00	

==== 1993 ====
1993 Canadian federal election
Party	Candidate	Votes	%	±%
Liberal	Derek Wells	17,351	46.94	+4.37
Progressive Conservative	Peter McCreath	12,058	32.62	−13.84
Reform	Anne Matthiasson	4,999	13.52	
New Democratic	Eric Hustvedt	1,847	5.00	−5.15
National	A. James Donahue	422	1.14	
Natural Law	Richard Robertson	287	0.78	
Total valid votes		36,964	100.00	

==== 1988 ====
1988 Canadian federal election
Party	Candidate	Votes	%	±%
Progressive Conservative	Peter McCreath	18,547	46.46	−10.23
Liberal	Mike Delory	16,995	42.57	13.55
New Democratic	Bill Zimmerman	4,052	10.15	−4.14
Libertarian	David Morgan	329	0.82	
Total valid votes		39,923	100.00	

==== 1984 ====
1984 Canadian federal election
Party	Candidate	Votes	%	±%
Progressive Conservative	Lloyd Crouse	22,347	56.69	12.30
Liberal	Paul Blades	11,439	29.02	−9.29
New Democratic	Bill Zimmerman	5,633	14.29	−1.82
Total valid votes		39,419	100.00	

==== 1980 ====
1980 Canadian federal election
Party	Candidate	Votes	%	±%
Progressive Conservative	Lloyd Crouse	16,139	44.39	−12.74
Liberal	Jim Kinley	13,926	38.31	+6.36
New Democratic	John Yates	5,856	16.11	+5.19
Rhinoceros	Martha Tudor	433	1.19	
Total valid votes		36,354	100.00	

==== 1979 ====
1979 Canadian federal election
Party	Candidate	Votes	%	±%
Progressive Conservative	Lloyd Crouse	20,867	57.14	+2.60
Liberal	Ted McFetridge	11,666	31.94	−7.02
New Democratic	John Yates	3,988	10.92	+5.08
Total valid votes		36,521	100.00	

==== 1974 ====
1974 Canadian federal election
Party	Candidate	Votes	%	±%
Progressive Conservative	Lloyd Crouse	18,206	54.54	−2.77
Liberal	Bill Martin	13,006	38.96	+3.32
New Democratic	Bob Manthorne	1,950	5.84	−1.22
Social Credit	Edward Peterson	222	0.66	
Total valid votes		33,384	100.00	

==== 1972 ====
1972 Canadian federal election
Party	Candidate	Votes	%	±%
Progressive Conservative	Lloyd Crouse	18,653	57.30	−1.23
Liberal	Jim Kinley	11,602	35.64	−3.28
New Democratic	Richard Stuart	2,297	7.06	+4.51
Total valid votes		32,552	100.00	

==== 1968 ====
1968 Canadian federal election
Party	Candidate	Votes	%
Progressive Conservative	Lloyd Crouse	17,547	58.53
Liberal	Jim Kinley	11,668	38.92
New Democratic	Aubrey Harding	764	2.55
Total valid votes		29,979	100.00

== See also ==
- List of Canadian electoral districts
- Historical federal electoral districts of Canada
