= 2004 Conservative Party of Canada leadership election =

Party election in Canada

- March 20, 2004
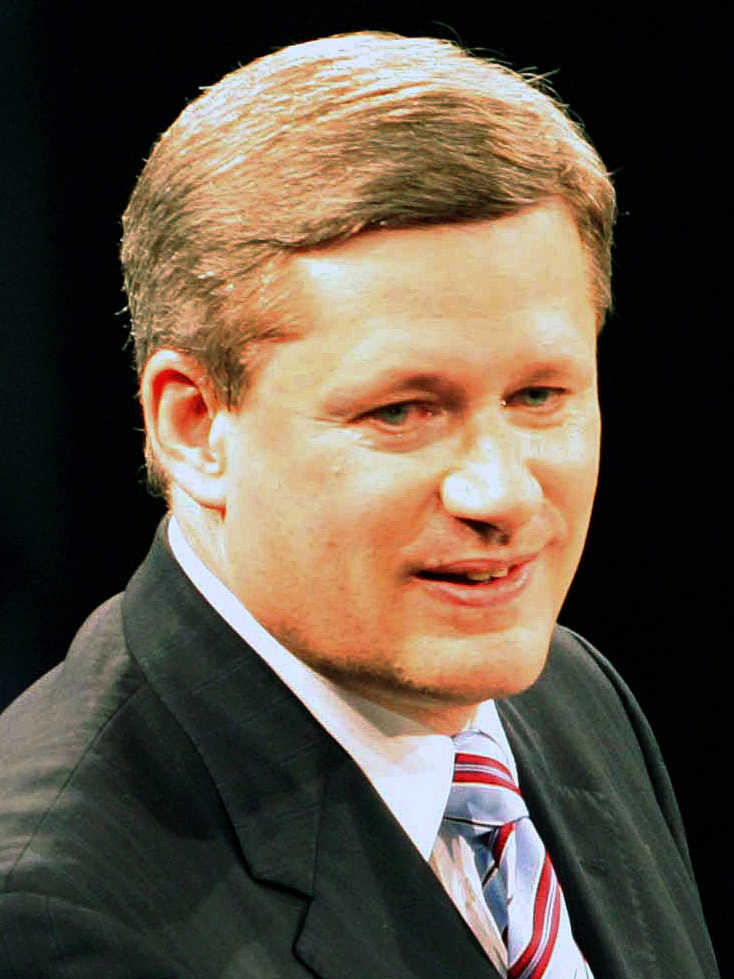

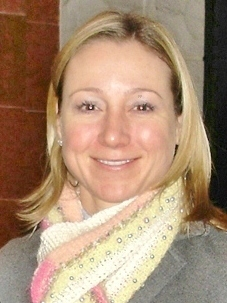

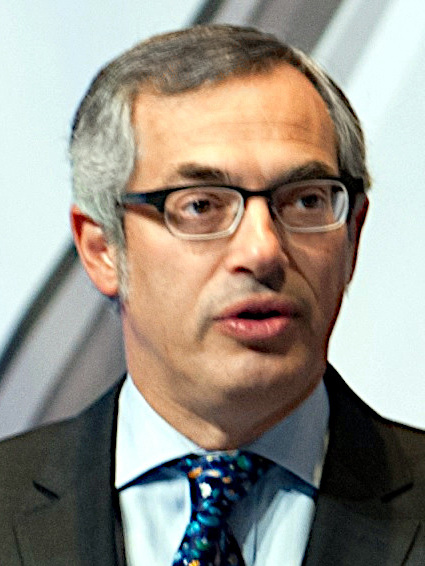
Candidate	Stephen Harper	Belinda Stronach	Tony Clement
Popular vote	67,143	22,286	7,968
Percentage	68.9%	22.9%	8.2%
Points	17,296	10,613	2,887
Percentage	56.2%	34.5%	9.4%
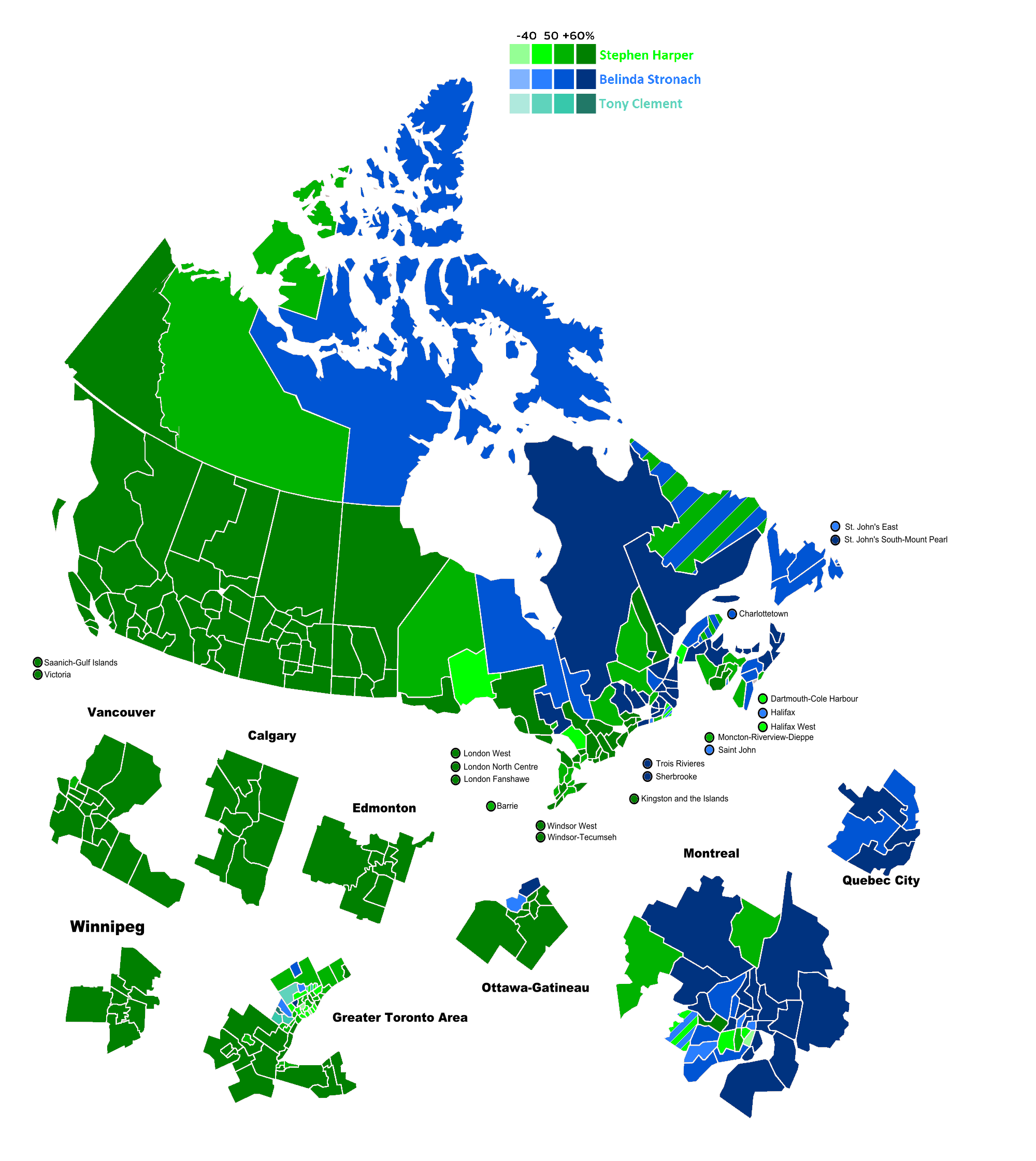
- Results by Canadian electoral district
Leader before election
John Lynch-Staunton (interim)
Elected Leader
Stephen Harper

2004 Conservative leadership election
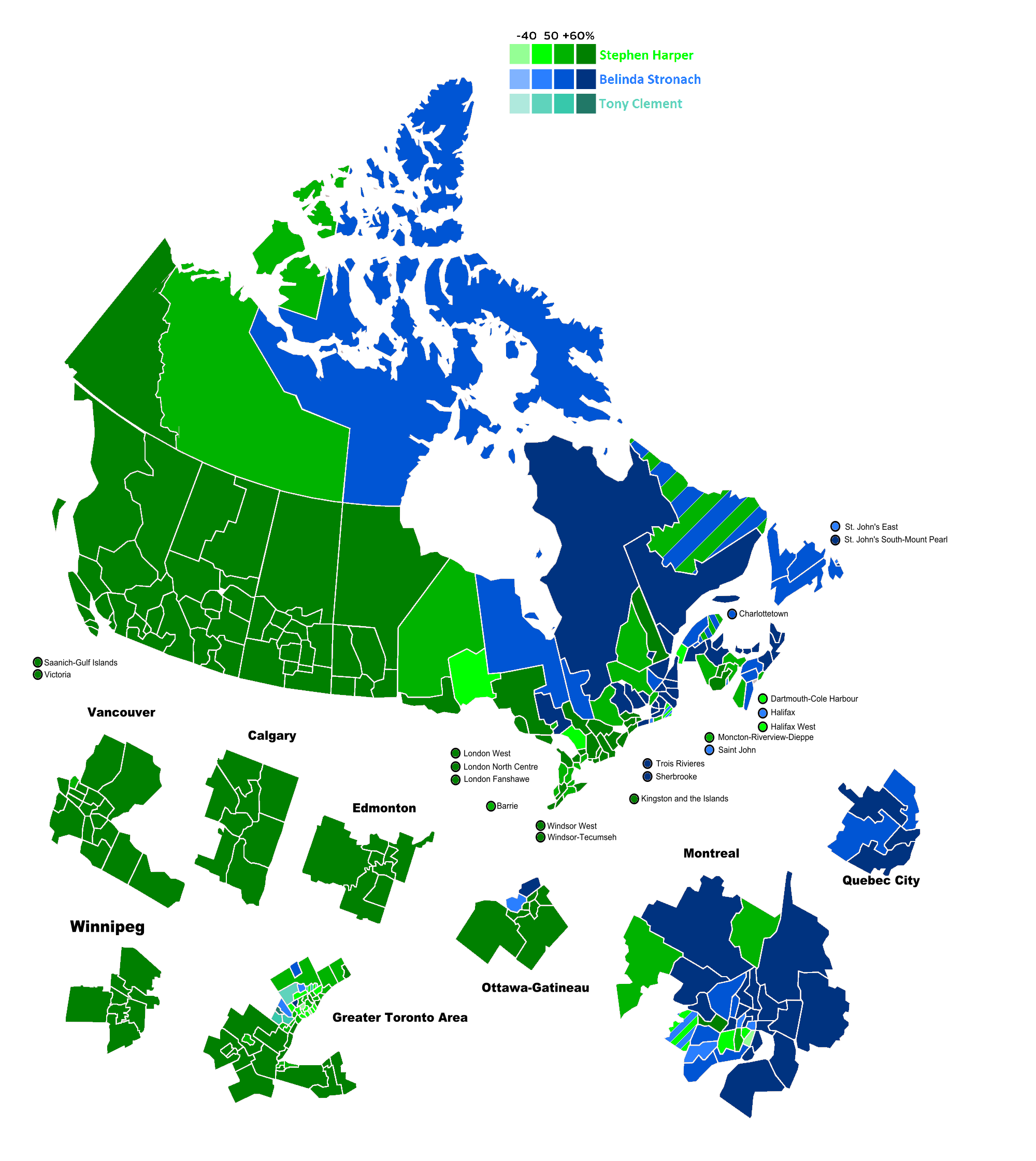
- Date: March 20, 2004
- Convention: Metro Toronto Convention Centre, Toronto
- Won by: Stephen Harper
- Ballots: 1
- Candidates: 3
- Entrance fee: C$100,000
- Spending limit: C$2.5 million

The 2004 Conservative Party of Canada leadership election took place on March 20, 2004, in Toronto, Ontario, and resulted in the election of Stephen Harper as the first leader of the new Conservative Party of Canada. The Conservative Party was formed by the merger of the Canadian Alliance and the Progressive Conservative Party of Canada, in December 2003.

Stephen Harper, the former leader of the Canadian Alliance, was elected on the first (and only) ballot. Tony Clement, a former Ontario Progressive Conservative health minister, and Belinda Stronach, the former chief executive officer of Magna International, were the other candidates on the ballot.

The leader was selected by a system in which each of the party's riding associations was allocated 100 points, which were allocated among candidates in proportion to the votes that he or she received. This system was selected as a condition of the merger, to prevent the far larger Canadian Alliance membership base from overwhelming that of the Progressive Conservatives.

Members voted using ranked ballots. If no candidate won a majority of votes in the first round, the ballots supporting the candidate with the smallest number of votes would be re-distributed according to the voters' second preferences. Subsequent rounds were not needed, however, because Stephen Harper won in the first round.

== Candidates ==
=== Tony Clement ===
42, Progressive Conservative Party of Ontario Member of Provincial Parliament for Brampton South (1995–2003), provincial Ministry of Health and Long-Term Care (2001–2003), provincial Minister of Municipal Affairs and Housing (1999–2001), provincial Minister of the Environment (1999–2000), provincial Minister of Transportation (1997–1999), third place candidate in Progressive Conservative Party of Ontario leadership election (2002)

Caucus Endorsements

- MPs: (5) Gerald Keddy (South Shore, NS), Chuck Strahl (Fraser Valley, BC), Norman Doyle (St. John's East, NL), Art Hanger (Calgary Northeast, AB), Peter Goldring (Edmonton Centre-East, AB)
- Senators: (2) Brenda Robertson (NB), Wilbert Keon (ON)

=== Stephen Harper ===
44, Reform Party of Canada MP for Calgary West (1993–1997), Canadian Alliance MP for Calgary Southwest (2002–), Leader of the Canadian Alliance (2002–2003), President of the National Citizens Coalition (1998–2002)

Caucus Endorsements

- MPs: (50) Jim Abbott (Kootenay-Columbia, BC), Diane Ablonczy (Calgary Nose Hill, AB), Rob Anders (Calgary West, AB), David Anderson (Cypress Hills—Grasslands, SK), Roy Bailey (Souris—Moose Mountain, SK), Leon Benoit (Lakeland, AB), Garry Breitkreuz (Yorkton—Melville, SK), Andy Burton (Skeena, BC), Chuck Cadman (Surrey North, BC), Rick Casson (Lethbridge, AB), Dave Chatters (Athabasca, AB), John Duncan (Vancouver Island North, BC), Reed Elley (Nanaimo-Cowichan, BC), Ken Epp (Elk Island, AB), Brian Fitzpatrick (Prince Albert, SK), Paul Forseth (New Westminster—Coquitlam—Burnaby, BC), Jim Gouk (Kootenay—Boundary—Okanagan, BC), Gurmant Grewal (Surrey Central, BC), Dick Harris (Prince George-Bulkley Valley, BC), Jay Hill (Prince George-Peace River, BC), Betty Hinton (Kamloops, Thompson and Highland Valleys, BC), Rahim Jaffer (Edmonton-Strathcona, AB), Dale Johnston (Wetaskiwin, AB), Jason Kenney (Calgary Southeast, AB), Gary Lunn (Saanich-Gulf Islands, BC), James Lunney (Nanaimo-Alberni, BC), Philip Mayfield (Cariboo—Chilcotin, BC), Grant McNally (Dewdney-Alouette, BC), Rob Merrifield (Yellowhead, AB), Bob Mills (Red Deer, AB), James Moore (Port Moody—Coquitlam, BC), Deepak Obhrai (Calgary East, AB), Brian Pallister (Portage-Lisgar, MB), Charlie Penson (Peace River, AB), James Rajotte (Edmonton Southwest, AB), Scott Reid (Lanark-Carleton, ON), John Reynolds (West Vancouver-Sunshine Coast, BC), Gerry Ritz (Battlefords-Lloydminster, SK), Werner Schmidt (Kelowna, BC), Carol Skelton (Saskatoon-Rosetown-Biggar, SK), Monte Solberg (Medicine Hat, AB), Kevin Sorenson (Crowfoot, AB), Darrel Stinson (Okanagan-Shuswap, BC), Greg Thompson (New Brunswick Southwest, NB), Myron Thompson (Wild Rose, AB), Vic Toews (Provencher, MB), Maurice Vellacott (Saskatoon-Wanuskewin, SK), Randy White (Langley-Abbotsford, BC), John Williams (St. Albert, AB), Lynne Yelich (Blackstrap, SK)
- Senators: (2) Gerry St. Germain (BC), David Tkachuk (SK)

=== Belinda Stronach ===
37, CEO of Magna International (2001–)

Caucus Endorsements

- MPs: (7) Gary Schellenberger (Perth-Middlesex, ON), Bill Casey (Cumberland-Colchester, NS), John Cummins (Delta-South Richmond, BC), Val Meredith (South Surrey-White Rock-Langley, BC), Loyola Hearn (St. John's West, NL), Rex Barnes (Gander—Grand Falls, NL), Inky Mark (Dauphin-Swan River, MB)
- Senators: (13) David Angus (QC), Ethel Cochrane (NF), Consiglio Di Nino (ON), John Trevor Eyton (ON), J. Michael Forrestall (NS), Noël Kinsella (NB), Pierre Claude Nolin (QC), John Buchanan (NS), Gerald Comeau (NS), Donald Oliver (NS), Marjory LeBreton (ON), Pat Carney (BC), Lenard Gustafson (SK)

== Announced they would not run ==
- Scott Brison – Progressive Conservative Member of Parliament (later defected to the Liberals)
- Mike Harris – former premier of Ontario
- Ralph Klein – Premier of Alberta
- Bernard Lord – Premier of New Brunswick
- Peter MacKay – former Progressive Conservative Party Leader
- Brian Pallister – Canadian Alliance Member of Parliament, later Premier of Manitoba
- Jim Prentice – Progressive Conservative 2003 leadership race runner up, later Premier of Alberta
- Bob Runciman – former Ontario public security minister
- Larry Smith – Publisher of the Montreal Gazette
- Chuck Strahl – Canadian Alliance Member of Parliament

== Results ==
Results by round
Candidate	1st round			
Candidate	Votes cast	%	Points allocated	%
Stephen Harper	67,143	68.9%	17,296	56.2%
Belinda Stronach	22,286	22.9%	10,613	34.5%
Tony Clement	7,968	8.2%	2,887	9.4
Total	97,397	100%	30,796	100%

Points needed to win: 15,401

Each of 308 ridings had 100 points which were distributed by proportional representation according to votes cast by party members in the riding.

Votes
Harper	68.94%
Stronach	22.88%
Clement	8.18%

Points
Harper	56.16%
Stronach	34.46%
Clement	9.37%

The actual vote totals remained confidential when the leadership election results were announced; only the point totals were made public at the time, giving the impression of a race that was much closer than was actually the case. Three years later, Harper's former campaign manager, Tom Flanagan, published the actual vote totals, noting that, among other distortions caused by the equal-weighting system, "a vote cast in Quebec was worth 19.6 times as much as a vote cast in Alberta".

== Total expenses ==
- Belinda Stronach $2,496,482
- Stephen Harper $2,073,084
- Tony Clement $826,807

== Timeline ==
=== 2003 ===
- December 5 – The Canadian Alliance votes with a 96% majority in favour of merging with the Progressive Conservative Party of Canada.
- December 6 – The Progressive Conservative Party votes, with 90% of delegates in favour of merging with the Canadian Alliance.
- December 8 – The Conservative Party of Canada is officially registered with Elections Canada. The party's first interim leader is Senator John Lynch-Staunton, with a formal leadership race scheduled for March 2004.
- December 10 – Scott Brison, Progressive Conservative MP, crosses the floor, and sits with the Liberal Party of Canada. Brison is the fourth PC MP, out of an original caucus of 15, to decide not to sit with the new Conservative Party of Canada.
- December 30 – Bernard Lord, Premier of New Brunswick, reconfirms that he will not seek the leadership of the Conservative Party. He had been considered a potential frontrunner.

=== 2004 ===
- January 12 – Stephen Harper announces his entry into the race to lead the new Conservative Party of Canada. Earlier that day, Jim Prentice drops out of the leadership contest, citing a lack of funds.
- January 13 – Peter MacKay declares he will not enter the race to lead the new Conservative Party of Canada.
- January 15 – Auto parts magnate Belinda Stronach and former Ontario Health Minister Tony Clement both announce their intention to run for leadership of the Conservative Party.
- January 16 – Fraser Valley MP Chuck Strahl announces he will not seek the Conservative leadership, citing financial barriers.
- January 20 – Belinda Stronach formally announces the launch of her campaign to seek the Conservative leadership. She rounds out the field at three; no other serious contenders are now seen as planning an entry.
- March 19 – The leadership convention opens in Toronto; the candidates give opening speeches.
- March 20 – Stephen Harper wins on the first ballot with 56% of points, under the party's weighted voting system.
- March 22 – Harper names former PC leader Peter MacKay the deputy leader of the Conservative party.

== Breakdown by province ==
Points allocated by candidate (rounded)
Province	Clement	Harper	Stronach	Total
Newfoundland and Labrador	102	231	369	702
Prince Edward Island	41	85	272	398
Nova Scotia	110	409	582	1,101
New Brunswick	51	461	492	1,004
Quebec	452	2,506	4,538	7,496
Ontario	1,672	6,035	2,891	10,598
Manitoba	72	1,029	299	1,400
Saskatchewan	51	1,141	208	1,400
Alberta	81	2,380	346	2,807
British Columbia	230	2,878	492	3,600
Yukon	6	62	32	100
Northwest Territories	9	53	39	101
Nunavut	17	28	56	101
Total	2,894	17,298	10,616	30,808

== Breakdown by riding ==
=== Newfoundland and Labrador ===
Riding	Clement	Harper	Stronach
Avalon	27	22	51
Bonavista—Exploits	12	36	53
Humber—St. Barbe—Baie; Verte	3	45	52
Labrador	0	50	50
Random—Burin—St. George's	13	31	56
St. John's North	30	26	45
St. John's South	17	21	62

=== Prince Edward Island ===
Riding	Clement	Harper	Stronach
Cardigan	11	11	77
Charlottetown	9	33	58
Egmont	9	23	68
Malpeque	12	18	69

=== Nova Scotia ===
Riding	Clement	Harper	Stronach
Cape Breton—Canso	9	23	68
Central Nova	6	24	70
Dartmouth—Cole Harbour	16	48	36
Halifax	13	38	49
Halifax West	15	44	41
Kings-Hants	6	37	57
North Nova	6	37	57
Sackville—Eastern Shore	10	51	39
South Shore—St. Margaret's	16	31	53
Sydney—Victoria	9	25	67
West Nova	4	51	45

=== New Brunswick ===
Riding	Clement	Harper	Stronach
Acadia-Bathurst	6	5	90
Beauséjour	2	50	48
Fredericton	7	64	29
Fundy	9	56	36
Madawaska—Restigouche	1	26	73
Miramichi	3	35	63
Moncton—Riverview— Dieppe	7	50	43
St. Croix—Belleisle	4	71	25
Saint John	9	45	47
Tobique—Mactaquac	3	59	38

=== Quebec ===
Riding	Clement	Harper	Stronach
Abitibi—Témiscamingue	0	44	56
Ahuntsic	0	35	65
Alfred-Pellan	5	37	58
Argenteuil—Mirabel	0	63	38
Beauce	0	22	78
Beauharnois—Salaberry	23	14	63
Beauport	4	46	50
Berthier—Maskinongé	3	18	80
Bourassa	0	46	54
Brome—Missisquoi	4	59	37
Brossard—La Prairie	8	29	63
Chambly—Borduas	3	15	82
Charlesbourg	3	23	74
Charlevoix—Montmorency	0	20	80
Châteauguay—Saint- Constant	2	7	91
Chicoutimi—Le Fjord	0	64	36
Compton—Stanstead	15	43	43
Drummond	2	27	71
Gaspésie—Îles-de-la- Madeleine	0	50	50
Gatineau	3	32	66
Hochelaga	0	0	100
Honoré-Mercier	0	4	96
Hull—Aylmer	11	40	44
Jeanne-Le Ber	12	26	62
Joliette	0	40	60
Jonquière—Alma	0	29	71
Lac-Saint-Louis	8	39	53
La Pointe-de-l'Île	7	13	80
LaSalle—Émard	6	33	61
Laurentides—Labelle	0	4	96
Laurier	31	26	43
Laval	4	72	24
Laval—Les Îles	9	34	57
Lévis—Bellechasse	0	35	65
Longueuil	0	33	67
Lotbinière—Chutes-de-la- Chaudière	0	23	77
Louis-Hébert	7	20	73
Louis-Saint-Laurent	3	47	50
Manicouagan	2	19	79
Marc-Aurèle-Fortin	10	23	67
Matapédia—Matane	0	47	53
Mégantic—L'Érable	0	16	84
Montcalm	3	32	66
Mount Royal	25	50	25
Notre-Dame-de-Grâce— Lachine	4	40	56
Nunavik—Eeyou	0	40	60
Outremont	34	40	26
Papineau	17	36	47
Pierrefonds—Dollard	17	35	49
Pontiac	6	55	39
Portneuf	2	40	58
Quebec	5	25	69
Repentigny	6	59	35
Richelieu	14	52	33
Richmond—Arthabaska	0	21	79
Rimouski—Témiscouata	15	46	38
Rivière-des-Mille-Îles	9	45	45
Rivière-du-Loup— Montmagny	0	8	93
Rivière-du-Nord	11	56	33
Roberval	0	52	48
Rosemont—La Petite-Patrie	5	33	62
Saint-Bruno—Saint-Hubert	1	5	94
Saint-Hyacinthe—Bagot	0	26	74
Saint-Jean	28	31	41
Saint-Lambert	2	30	67
Saint-Laurent—Cartierville	15	44	41
Saint-Léonard—Saint- Michel	0	5	95
Saint-Maurice—Champlain	0	53	47
Shefford	2	16	81
Sherbrooke	0	32	68
Terrebonne—Blainville	4	20	76
Trois-Rivières	0	39	61
Vaudreuil-Soulanges	12	72	16
Vercheres—Les Patriotes	0	12	88
Westmount—Ville-Marie	30	39	31

=== Ontario ===
Riding	Clement	Harper	Stronach
Ajax-Pickering	12	57	32
Algoma—Manitoulin— Kapuskasing	8	64	28
Ancaster—Dundas— Flamborough —Westdale	11	67	21
Barrie	9	59	32
Beaches—East York	26	44	31
Bramalea—Gore—Malton	25	28	47
Brampton—Springdale	62	28	10
Brampton West	54	32	14
Brant	13	64	23
Burlington	12	60	27
Cambridge	11	64	25
Carleton—Lanark	6	67	27
Chatham-Kent—Essex	8	66	26
Clarington—Scugog— Uxbridge	7	68	24
Davenport	29	41	30
Don Valley East	16	62	22
Don Valley West	24	51	25
Dufferin—Caledon	14	56	30
Eglinton—Lawrence	37	39	24
Elgin—Middlesex—London	12	57	31
Essex	8	72	20
Etobicoke Centre	17	59	24
Etobicoke—Lakeshore	22	51	26
Etobicoke North	20	43	37
Glengarry—Prescott— Russell	5	72	23
Grey—Bruce—Owen Sound	7	68	24
Guelph	19	56	25
Haldimand—Norfolk	10	67	23
Haliburton—Kawartha; Lakes— Brock	6	67	28
Halton	17	64	19
Hamilton Centre	10	57	33
Hamilton East—Stoney; Creek	7	56	37
Hamilton Mountain	16	74	11
Huron—Bruce	13	52	35
Kenora	9	51	40
Kingston and the Islands	16	62	23
Kitchener Centre	12	61	28
Kitchener—Conestoga	6	70	24
Kitchener—Waterloo	15	60	25
Lanark—Frontenac— Lennox and Addington	7	72	21
Leeds—Grenville	5	69	27
London—Fanshawe	12	68	20
London North Centre	11	67	21
London West	9	76	15
Markham—Unionville	40	40	20
Middlesex—Kent—Lambton	11	62	26
Mississauga—Brampton; South	56	32	12
Mississauga East— Cooksville	15	54	31
Mississauga—Erindale	21	51	28
Mississauga South	18	60	22
Mississauga—Streetsville	28	51	21
Nepean—Carleton	5	69	26
Newmarket—Aurora	7	37	57
Niagara Falls	9	69	22
Niagara West—Glanbrook	8	71	21
Nickel Belt	6	34	60
Nipissing—Timiskaming	4	62	34
Northumberland—Quinte; West	16	64	20
Oak Ridges—Markham	18	53	29
Oakville	15	65	20
Oshawa	15	60	25
Ottawa Centre	9	65	26
Ottawa—Orléans	6	65	29
Ottawa South	8	67	26
Ottawa—Vanier	9	60	31
Ottawa West—Nepean	8	66	26
Oxford	18	54	28
Parkdale—High Park	29	43	28
Parry Sound—Muskoka	17	49	33
Perth—Wellington	14	54	32
Peterborough	9	74	17
Pickering—Scarborough; East	11	54	36
Prince Edward—Hastings	8	66	26
Renfrew—Nipissing— Pembroke	4	82	15
Richmond Hill	19	38	43
St. Catharines	15	66	19
St. Paul's	34	43	23
Sarnia—Lambton	18	59	23
Sault Ste. Marie	7	68	25
Scarborough—Agincourt	13	53	34
Scarborough Centre	14	59	27
Scarborough—Guildwood	13	55	32
Scarborough—Rouge River	34	40	26
Scarborough Southwest	15	60	25
Simcoe—Grey	11	71	18
Simcoe North	10	64	26
Stormont—Dundas—South; Glengarry	6	71	22
Sudbury	11	50	39
Thornhill	27	48	25
Thunder Bay—Rainy River	8	73	19
Thunder Bay—Superior; North	28	48	24
Timmins—James Bay	5	36	59
Toronto Centre	25	38	37
Toronto—Danforth	22	45	33
Trinity—Spadina	25	42	33
Vaughan	42	23	35
Welland	8	69	22
Wellington—Halton Hills	11	64	24
Whitby—Oshawa	18	59	22
Willowdale	19	55	25
Windsor—Tecumseh	18	65	17
Windsor West	12	79	9
York Centre	20	56	24
York—Simcoe	16	52	32
York South—Weston	17	46	37
York West	14	19	67

=== Manitoba ===
Riding	Clement	Harper	Stronach
Brandon—Souris	4	74	22
Charleswood—St. James	5	67	28
Churchill	3	71	25
Dauphin—Swan River	2	67	31
Elmwood—Transcona	2	77	21
Kildonan—St. Paul	6	81	13
Portage—Lisgar	5	74	21
Provencher	4	86	10
Saint Boniface	4	73	23
Selkirk—Interlake	5	78	17
Winnipeg Centre	10	67	23
Winnipeg North	6	74	21
Winnipeg South	6	76	18
Winnipeg South Centre	10	64	26

=== Saskatchewan ===
Riding	Clement	Harper	Stronach
Battlefords—Lloydminster	0	89	10
Blackstrap	4	80	17
Churchill River	2	89	9
Cypress Hills—Grasslands	2	90	8
Palliser	4	77	19
Prince Albert	1	86	13
Regina—Lumsden—Lake; Centre	6	74	19
Regina—Qu'Appelle	3	82	15
Saskatoon—Humboldt	8	79	14
Saskatoon—Rosetown— Biggar	4	84	11
Saskatoon—Wanuskewin	2	90	8
Souris—Moose Mountain	4	68	29
Wascana	6	69	25
Yorkton—Melville	5	84	11

=== Alberta ===
Riding	Clement	Harper	Stronach
Athabasca	2	83	15
Calgary East	4	86	10
Calgary North Centre	6	81	13
Calgary Northeast	4	71	25
Calgary—Nose Hill	5	83	13
Calgary South Centre	7	80	13
Calgary Southeast	4	85	11
Calgary Southwest	4	90	6
Calgary West	5	83	12
Crowfoot	1	92	7
Edmonton—Beaumont	3	77	21
Edmonton Centre	4	79	17
Edmonton East	2	84	14
Edmonton—Leduc	3	86	11
Edmonton—St. Albert	2	88	11
Edmonton—Sherwood Park	5	82	14
Edmonton—Spruce Grove	2	83	16
Edmonton—Strathcona	3	77	19
Lethbridge	2	91	7
Macleod	2	87	11
Medicine Hat	1	92	7
Peace River	2	84	15
Red Deer	2	90	8
Vegreville—Wainwright	1	89	10
Westlock—St. Paul	1	84	15
Wetaskiwin	1	94	5
Wild Rose	2	90	9
Yellowhead	1	89	11

=== British Columbia ===
Riding	Clement	Harper	Stronach
Abbotsford	3	93	4
Burnaby—Douglas	9	81	10
Burnaby—New Westminster	15	75	10
Cariboo—Prince George	2	85	13
Chilliwack—Fraser Canyon	26	66	8
Delta—Richmond East	6	67	27
Dewdney—Alouette	7	81	12
Esquimalt—Juan de Fuca	4	86	10
Fleetwood—Port Kells	6	80	15
Kamloops—Thompson	3	85	12
Kelowna	1	84	15
Kootenay—Columbia	1	91	8
Langley	7	78	15
Nanaimo—Alberni	4	88	8
Nanaimo—Cowichan	3	87	10
Newton—North Delta	3	74	23
New Westminster— Coquitlam	11	80	8
North Okanagan—Shuswap	3	89	8
North Vancouver	6	84	10
Okanagan—Coquihalla	3	79	18
Port Moody—Westwood— Port Coquitlam	18	63	19
Prince George—Peace River	1	87	12
Richmond	1	89	10
Saanich—Gulf Islands	5	85	10
Skeena—Bulkley Valley	3	82	14
Southern Interior	3	84	13
South Surrey—White Rock —Cloverdale	4	82	14
Surrey North	3	77	20
Vancouver Centre	10	56	34
Vancouver East	6	65	29
Vancouver Island North	3	88	10
Vancouver Kingsway	11	71	18
Vancouver Quadra	10	74	16
Vancouver South	14	75	11
Victoria	10	76	14
West Vancouver— Sunshine Coast	5	91	4

=== Yukon ===
Riding	Clement	Harper	Stronach
Yukon	6	62	32

=== Northwest Territories ===
Riding	Clement	Harper	Stronach
Western Arctic	9	53	39

=== Nunavut ===
Riding	Clement	Harper	Stronach
Nunavut	17	28	56

== See also ==
- Canadian Alliance leadership elections
- Progressive Conservative leadership conventions
