= List of MPs who stood down at the 1993 Canadian federal election =

This is a list of members of Parliament (MPs) who held seats at the end of the 34th Canadian Parliament who did not stand for re-election in the 1993 federal election. In total, 73 MPs stood down.

== List ==
MP	Seat	Province	First elected	Party
Edna Anderson	Simcoe Centre	Ontario	1988	Progressive Conservative
Lenard Gustafson	Souris—Moose Mountain	Saskatchewan	1979	Progressive Conservative
Harvie Andre	Calgary Centre	Alberta	1972	Progressive Conservative
Les Benjamin	Regina—Lumsden	Saskatchewan	1968	New Democratic
Gabrielle Bertrand	Brome—Missisquoi	Quebec	1984	Progressive Conservative
Derek Blackburn	Brant	Ontario	1971	New Democratic
Benoît Bouchard	Roberval	Quebec	1984	Progressive Conservative
Pierre Cadieux	Vaudreuil	Quebec	1984	Progressive Conservative
Catherine Callbeck	Malpeque	Prince Edward Island	1988	Liberal
Coline Campbell	South West Nova	Nova Scotia	1988	Liberal
Gilbert Chartrand	Verdun—Saint-Paul	Quebec	1984	Progressive Conservative
Joe Clark	Yellowhead	Alberta	1972	Progressive Conservative
Terry Clifford	London—Middlesex	Ontario	1984	Progressive Conservative
Chuck Cook	North Vancouver	British Columbia	1979	Progressive Conservative
Albert Cooper	Peace River	Alberta	1980	Progressive Conservative
Howard Crosby	Halifax West	Nova Scotia	1978	Progressive Conservative
Marcel Danis	Verchères—Les Patriotes	Quebec	1984	Progressive Conservative
Stan Darling	Parry Sound—Muskoka	Ontario	1972	Progressive Conservative
Robert de Cotret	Berthier—Montcalm	Quebec	1984	Progressive Conservative
Maurice Dionne	Miramichi	Nova Scotia	1988	Liberal
Phil Edmonston	Chambly	Quebec	1990	New Democratic
Jake Epp	Provencher	Manitoba	1972	Progressive Conservative
Ralph Ferguson	Lambton—Middlesex	Ontario	1988	Liberal
Gabriel Fontaine	Lévis	Quebec	1984	Progressive Conservative
Maurice Foster	Algoma—Manitoulin	Ontario	1968	Liberal
John Allen Fraser	Vancouver South	British Columbia	1972	Progressive Conservative
Girve Fretz	Erie	Ontario	1979	Progressive Conservative
Benno Friesen	Surrey—White Rock—South Langley	British Columbia	1974	Progressive Conservative
Jim Fulton	Skeena	British Columbia	1979	New Democratic
François Gérin	Mégantic—Compton—Stanstead	Quebec	1984	Progressive Conservative
Bruce Halliday	Oxford	Ontario	1974	Progressive Conservative
Dan Heap	Trinity—Spadina	Ontario	1981	New Democratic
Bob Hicks	Scarborough East	Ontario	1984	Progressive Conservative
Stan Hovdebo	Saskatoon—Humboldt	Saskatchewan	1979	New Democratic
Jean-Guy Hudon	Beauharnois—Salaberry	Quebec	1984	Progressive Conservative
Otto Jelinek	Oakville—Milton	Ontario	1972	Progressive Conservative
Bob Kaplan	York Centre	Ontario	1974	Liberal
Bill Kempling	Burlington	Ontario	1972	Progressive Conservative
Lyle Kristiansen	Kootenay West—Revelstoke	British Columbia	1988	New Democratic
Jean Lapierre	Shefford	Quebec	1979	Liberal
Robert Layton	Lachine—Lac-Saint-Louis	Quebec	1984	Progressive Conservative
Willie Littlechild	Wetaskiwin	Alberta	1988	Progressive Conservative
John MacDougall	Timiskaming—French River	Ontario	1982	Progressive Conservative
Elmer MacKay	Central Nova	Nova Scotia	1984	Progressive Conservative
Arnold Malone	Crowfoot	Alberta	1979	Progressive Conservative
Marcel Prud'homme	Saint-Denis	Quebec	1964	Liberal
Shirley Martin	Lincoln	Ontario	1984	Progressive Conservative
Marcel Masse	Frontenac	Quebec	1984	Progressive Conservative
Don Mazankowski	Vegreville	Alberta	1968	Progressive Conservative
John McDermid	Brampton	Ontario	1979	Progressive Conservative
Barbara McDougall	St. Paul's	Ontario	1984	Progressive Conservative
Bill McKnight	Kindersley—Lloydminster	Saskatchewan	1979	Progressive Conservative
Walter McLean	Waterloo	Ontario	1979	Progressive Conservative
Gerald Merrithew	Saint John	Nova Scotia	1984	Progressive Conservative
Gus Mitges	Bruce—Grey	Ontario	1972	Progressive Conservative
Brian Mulroney	Charlevoix	Quebec	1983	Progressive Conservative
Frank Oberle Sr.	Prince George—Peace River	British Columbia	1972	Progressive Conservative
Steve Paproski	Edmonton North	Alberta	1968	Progressive Conservative
Robert Harold Porter	Medicine Hat	Alberta	1984	Progressive Conservative
Denis Pronovost	Saint-Maurice	Quebec	1988	Progressive Conservative
Gilles Rocheleau	Hull—Aylmer	Quebec	1988 (as Liberal)	Bloc Québécois
Geoff Scott	Hamilton—Wentworth	Ontario	1978	Progressive Conservative
William C. Scott	Victoria—Haliburton	Ontario	1965	Progressive Conservative
Jacques Tétreault	Laval Centre	Quebec	1988	Progressive Conservative
Blaine Thacker	Lethbridge	Alberta	1979	Progressive Conservative
Maurice Tremblay	Lotbinière	Quebec	1984	Progressive Conservative
John Turner	Vancouver Quadra	British Columbia	1984	Liberal
Walter van de Walle	St. Albert	Alberta	1986	Progressive Conservative
Monique Vézina	Rimouski—Témiscouata	Quebec	1984	Progressive Conservative
Robert L. Wenman	Fraser Valley West	British Columbia	1974	Progressive Conservative
Brian White	Dauphin—Swan River	Manitoba	1984	Progressive Conservative
Michael Wilson	Etobicoke Centre	Ontario	1979	Progressive Conservative
William Winegard	Guelph—Wellington	Ontario	1984	Progressive Conservative
