= Val Meredith =

Canadian politician and realtor

Member of Parliament for South Surrey—White Rock—Langley Surrey—White Rock—South Langley (1993-1997)
- In office 1993–2004
- Preceded by: Benno Friesen
- Succeeded by: Russ Hiebert (South Surrey—White Rock—Cloverdale)

Personal details
- Born: Valerie Ross; 22 April 1949 (age 77) Edmonton, Alberta, Canada
- Party: Maverick Party (2021–present)
- Other political affiliations: Reform (1988–1997); Alliance (2002–2003); Conservative (2003-2021)

Valerie Meredith (née Ross; born 22 April 1949) is a Canadian politician and realtor. Meredith served as a member of the House of Commons of Canada from 1993 to 2004.

Born in Edmonton, Alberta, Meredith was a town councillor in Slave Lake, Alberta from 1973 until 1977 when she became Mayor, serving until 1980.

In 1988, Meredith made an unsuccessful attempt to enter politics as a Reform party candidate in the Surrey—White Rock—South Langley riding. Her second campaign for the riding in 1993 was successful. She was re-elected in 1997 and 2000 in South Surrey—White Rock—Langley as the Reform party transitioned into the Canadian Alliance then the Conservative Party. In all, she was a member of the 35th, 36th and 37th Canadian Parliaments.

In early 2001, she temporarily joined the Democratic Representative Caucus group in protest of Stockwell Day's Alliance Party leadership.

Following electoral district restructuring and the formation of the new Conservative Party, Meredith attempted to become the Conservative candidate in South Surrey—White Rock—Cloverdale. She lost the party's riding nomination to Russ Hiebert and left federal politics after the 2004 general election. Following her departure from federal politics, she became a partner in The Parliamentary Group, a political lobby organisation based in Ottawa, Ontario.

Meredith's father is Joseph Donovan Ross, an Alberta cabinet minister who was a member of the Legislative Assembly of Alberta from 1952 until 1971. She has four children from a former marriage.

Between 2021 and 2022, Meredith was a member of the board of directors of the Maverick Party.
