= Mark Warawa =

Canadian politician (1950–2019)

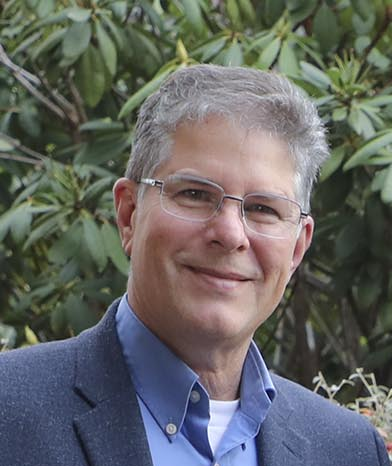
- Warawa in 2017

Chair of the Standing Committee on The Environment
- In office June 21, 2011 – January 28, 2013
- Minister: Peter Kent
- Preceded by: James Bezan
- Succeeded by: Harold Albrecht

Member of Parliament for Langley—Aldergrove (Langley; 2004–2015)
- In office June 28, 2004 – June 20, 2019
- Preceded by: Riding established
- Succeeded by: Tako van Popta

Personal details
- Born: May 7, 1950
- Died: June 20, 2019 (aged 69) Langley, British Columbia, Canada
- Party: Conservative
- Profession: Insurance executive

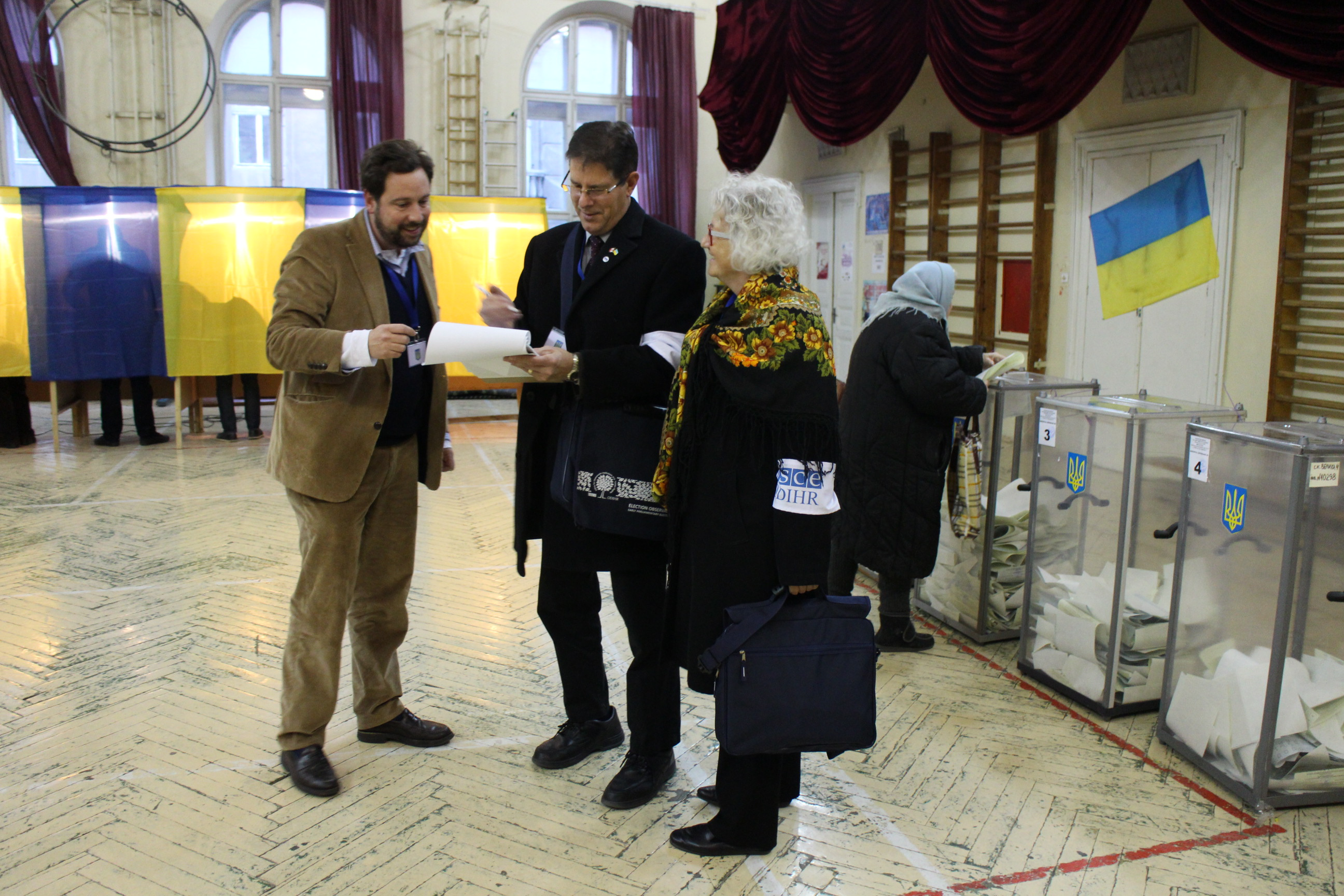
OSCE Parliamentary Assembly Mission Canadian M.P. Mark Warawa and Linda Duncan fill out Observation forms at a Polling Station in Lviv for the 2014 Ukrainian parliamentary election

Mark Warawa (May 7, 1950 – June 20, 2019) was a Canadian politician. Formerly a businessman and loss prevention officer as well as a city councillor in Abbotsford, British Columbia from 1990 to 2004, Warawa was the Member of Parliament for Langley—Aldergrove (originally called Langley) from 2004 until his death in 2019.

On February 10, 2006, Warawa was named parliamentary secretary to the Minister of the Environment. Less recently, he served as a member of the Standing Committee on Justice, Human Rights, Public Safety and Emergency Preparedness.

Warawa introduced a private member's bill in the House of Commons, condemning discrimination against females in sex-selective abortion.

He and his wife, Diane, lived in Langley and had five children. His son Ryan was the Conservative candidate in Vancouver East in the 2008 election, losing to Libby Davies of the NDP.

Warawa died of pancreatic cancer on June 20, 2019.

== Electoral record ==
2015 Canadian federal election: Langley—Aldergrove
Party	Candidate	Votes	%	±%	Expenditures
Conservative	Mark Warawa	27,333	45.6	-20.22	–
Liberal	Leon Jensen	21,894	36.6	+27.62	–
New Democratic	Margot Sangster	7,490	12.5	-6.85	–
Green	Simmi Kaur Dhillon	2644	4.4	-0.86	–
Libertarian	Lauren Southern	535	0.9	+0.41	–
Total valid votes/Expense limit		59,896	100.0		$216,042.49
Total rejected ballots		204	–	–	
Turnout		60,100	–	–	
Eligible voters		80,360			
Conservative hold		Swing		-23.92	
Source: Elections Canada

2011 Canadian federal election: Langley
Party	Candidate	Votes	%	±%	Expenditures
Conservative	Mark Warawa	35,569	64.52	+3.07	$53,982.10
New Democratic	Piotr Majkowski	11,277	20.45	+3.68	$16,297.61
Liberal	Rebecca Darnell	4,990	9.05	-2.05	$38,125.25
Green	Carey Poitras	2,943	5.34	-4.19	$4,855.42
Pirate	Craig Nobbs	353	0.64	–	
Total valid votes		55,132	100.0		
Total rejected ballots		158	0.29	+0.01	
Turnout		55,290	62.15	+0.21	
Eligible voters		88,964			
Conservative hold		Swing		-0.30	

2008 Canadian federal election: Langley
Party	Candidate	Votes	%	±%	Expenditures
Conservative	Mark Warawa	32,594	61.45	+8.88	$41,721
New Democratic	Andrew Claxton	8,898	16.77	-1.61	$4,837
Liberal	Jake Gray	5,888	11.10	-11.99	$4,003
Green	Patrick Meyer	5,059	9.53	+3.97	$3,740
Christian Heritage	Ron Gray	594	1.12	–	$7,888
Total valid votes/Expense limit		53,033	100.0		$88,558
Total rejected ballots		147	0.28	+0.07	
Turnout		53,180	61.94	-4.14	
Conservative hold		Swing		+5.24	

2006 Canadian federal election: Langley
Party	Candidate	Votes	%	±%	Expenditures
Conservative	Mark Warawa	28,577	52.57	+4.87	$52,552
Liberal	Bill Brooks	12,553	23.09	-1.65	$23,836
New Democratic	Angel Claypool	9,993	18.38	+1.63	$5,097
Green	Patrick Meyer	3,023	5.56	-0.52	$1,017
Canadian Action	Vicki Lee Sloan	211	0.38	–	$394
Total valid votes		54,357	100.0		
Total rejected ballots		116	0.21	-0.05	
Turnout		54,473	66.08	-0.7	
Conservative hold		Swing		+3.26	

2004 Canadian federal election: Langley
Party	Candidate	Votes	%	Expenditures
Conservative	Mark Warawa	24,390	47.70	$56,502
Liberal	Kim Richter	12,649	24.74	$17,578
New Democratic	Dean Morrison	8,568	16.75	$3,207
Green	Patrick Meyer	3,108	6.08	$3,130
Independent	Mel Kositsky	2,422	4.74	$15,220
Total valid votes		51,137	100.0	
Total rejected ballots		131	0.26	
Turnout		51,268	65.4	
This riding was created from parts of Langley—Abbotsford and South Surrey—White Rock—Langley, both of which elected a Canadian Alliance candidate in the previous election.

1996 British Columbia general election: Abbotsford
Party	Candidate	Votes	%	±%
Liberal	John van Dongen	10,998	50.25	▲7.44
New Democratic	Bruce Temple	5,405	24.69	▲15.73
Reform	Mark Warawa	4,086	18.67	▼21.91
Progressive Democrat	Merilyn Anderson	1,126	5.14	▲2.15
Green	Geoff Berner	274	1.25	▲0.68
Total valid votes		21,889	100.00	
Total rejected ballots		72		
Liberal hold		Swing		+14.68
