= Surrey Central =

Former federal electoral district in British Columbia, Canada

British Columbia electoral district

Defunct federal electoral district
- Legislature: House of Commons
- District created: 1996
- District abolished: 2003
- First contested: 1997
- Last contested: 2000

Demographics
- Population (2001): 179,158
- Electors (2000): 97,421
- Area (km²): 152
- Census division: Metro Vancouver
- Census subdivision: Surrey

Surrey Central was a federal electoral district in British Columbia, Canada, used in the 1997 and 2000 elections to elect a Member of Parliament for the 36th and 37th Parliaments, respectively. The electoral district was created, in 1996, as part of the expansion of the House of Commons of Canada from 295 to 301 seats, which gave British Columbia two additional seats. Gurmant Grewal won the 1997 election for the Reform Party of Canada which became the official opposition. After the Reform Party disbanded, Grewal joined the Canadian Alliance and won re-election in 2000, with his party again forming the official opposition. The electoral district was abolished when the House of Commons again expanded for the 2004 election.

Located entirely within the municipality of Surrey, Surrey Central had its southern boundary along the Serpentine River and its northern boundary fronting the Surrey North electoral district. Using the last available census (1991), it was estimated to have 112,682 people during the 1997 election, which was higher than the average electoral district. When the data from the 1996 census became available Surrey Central was estimated to be the most populous electoral district in Canada, at 149,468 people. People with a South Asian ethnicity made up about a quarter of the electoral district's population and it included the largest concentration of Indo-Canadians in any electoral district in Canada.

== Geography ==
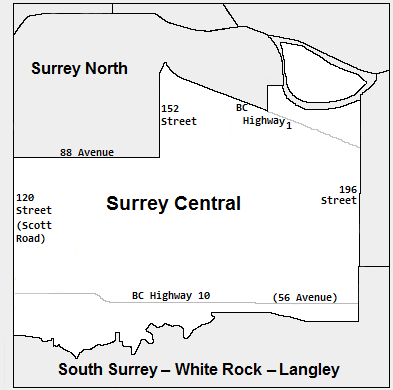
The boundaries of the defunct federal electoral district

The electoral district of Surrey Central was located within the province of British Columbia. It encompassed 152 square kilometres (59 sq mi) of the city of Surrey and the Barnston Island portion of Greater Vancouver's Electoral Area A. It used Surrey's municipal boundaries with Delta and Langley as its western and eastern borders and the Serpentine River as its southern border. The northern border was 88th Avenue (to 152nd Street), BC Highway 1 (to 176th Street) and the Fraser River.

== History and demographics ==
The Electoral Boundaries Readjustment Act, 1995 adopted during the 35th Canadian Parliament's 1st Session and the subsequent Representation Order, 1996, increased the number of electoral districts in British Columbia from 32 to 34, and increased the total number of seats in the House of Commons of Canada from 295 to 301. British Columbia's two new electoral districts, as created by the Electoral Boundaries Commission, were Surrey Central and Vancouver Kingsway. Surrey Central was created using the Surrey portion of the abolished Surrey—White Rock—South Langley and the southern and eastern portion of the geographically reduced Surrey North.

Data from the 1991 census placed the population of the new Surrey Central electoral district at 112,682 people. That figure was used to estimate that there were 82,322 electors during the 1997 election, about 14% higher than the average federal electoral district in British Columbia. For the 2000 election, the population estimate was adjusted using data from the 1996 census to 149,468 people (97,421 electors), making it the most populous electoral district in Canada. The 2001 census provided a more complete profile of the electoral district, showing it to have 179,165 people. The largest ethnic minority was South Asian at 28% of the population and 39% reported a mother tongue that was neither English or French. The two largest religious groups were Protestant at 25% and Sikh at 22%.

The Surrey Central electoral district existed until the June 2004 election which had new electoral districts in accordance with Representation Order, 2003. The total number of seats in the House of Commons had been increased from 301 to 308, giving British Columbia two more electoral districts. The reapportioning sent the western side, between the municipal boundary and King George Highway, to Newton—North Delta, and the southeastern portion, between Fraser Highway, 72nd Avenue and 160th Street, to South Surrey—White Rock—Cloverdale. A small portion was sent back to Surrey North but the majority of Surrey Central, including Barnston Island, formed the new Fleetwood—Port Kells electoral district.

== Members of Parliament ==
Parliament	Years	Member	Party
Surrey—White Rock—South Langley and Surrey North prior to 1997
36th	1997–2000	Gurmant Grewal	Reform
36th	2000	Gurmant Grewal	Canadian Alliance
37th	2000–2003	Gurmant Grewal	Canadian Alliance
37th	2003–2004	Gurmant Grewal	Conservative
Fleetwood—Port Kells, Newton—North Delta, South Surrey—White Rock—Cloverdale and Surrey North after 2004

Source: Member of Parliament.

== Elections ==
=== 1993 ===
1993 federal election redistributed results
Party	Vote	%
Reform	21,555	41.40
Liberal	15,321	29.43
Progressive Conservative	7,052	13.54
New Democratic	5,207	10.00
Others	2,930	5.63

=== 1997 ===
The 1997 election campaign began with four Indo-Canadians winning nomination contests. As Surrey Central had the largest concentration of Indo-Canadians in any electoral district in Canada, speaking a second language or otherwise being able to connect with the Indo-Canadian community was an advantage. Palbinder Shergill, a 31-year-old lawyer, would represent the Liberal Party, Charan Gill, a 60-year-old social worker who had unsuccessfully run in the Surrey—White Rock—South Langley during the 1988 election, would represent the New Democratic Party, and communications consultant Imtiaz Popat would represent the Green Party. Gurmant Grewal, a 39-year-old realtor, unexpectedly won the Reform Party nomination over Mike Runte and Lorna Dysart, after Grewal registered 700 new party members just before the filing deadline. There was an accusation by a Reform Party member that the Sikh community had colluded to nominate Sikh candidates in all the major parties and Dysart accused the Reform Party officials of being biased in favour of seeing somebody from an ethnic minority group winning the nomination. At the time, the Reform Party was fighting a perception that they were oblivious to the multi-racial composition of Canadian society and struggling with an image of extremism. Dysart left the Reform Party to join the Progressive Conservative Party. In reaction to several Indo-Canadians already nominated, the Progressive Conservative riding association announced it was purposefully seeking a "white candidate" to avoid further splitting the Indo-Canadian vote. However, Vince Antonio, whose parents had emigrated to Canada from the Philippines, also defeated Dysart. After losing the Reform Party nomination to Grewal, Mike Runte, a 48-year-old Royal Canadian Mounted Police (RCMP) officer registered to run as an independent candidate. The Royal Canadian Mounted Police Act prevented active officers from being candidates for political office and Runte was ordered by his superiors to withdraw. Runte refused the order, believing it unconstitutional, and consequently was suspended from the RCMP and faced a disciplinary tribunal. Other candidates participating in the election included Philip McCormack for the Canadian Action Party, student Val Litwin for the Natural Law Party, lineman Gaetan Myre running as an independent, and engineering assistant Bill Stilwell, who had previously run in Surrey North during the 1988 and 1993 elections, for the Christian Heritage Party. While Gurmant Grewal won the riding, the Reform Party only won 60 seats nationally and formed the official opposition to the Liberal Party who formed a majority government in the 36th Parliament.

1997 Canadian federal election
Party	Candidate	Votes	%	±%	Expenditures
Reform	Gurmant Grewal	17,461	34.67	-6.73	$32,008
Liberal	Palbinder Shergill	14,595	28.98	-0.44	$65,570
New Democratic	Charan Gill	7,064	14.03	+4.03	$58,025
Independent	Mike Runte	4,596	9.13	n/a	$25,401
Progressive Conservative	Vincent Antonio	4,327	8.59	-4.95	$24,601
Christian Heritage	Bill Stilwell	978	1.94	n/a	$2,944
Canadian Action	Philip McCormack	634	1.26	n/a	$3,497
Green	Imtiaz Popat	417	0.83	n/a	0
Natural Law	Val Litwin	147	0.29	n/a	0
Independent	Gaetan Myre	140	0.28	n/a	$681
Total valid votes/expense limit		50,359	99.61	n/a	$66,100
Total rejected ballots		368	0.73		
Turnout		50,727	61.62		
Reform notional hold		Swing		-3.14	
Source: votes, totals, and expenditures.

=== 2000 ===
Following the conversion of the Reform Party to the Canadian Alliance in March 2000, Prime Minister Jean Chrétien called a snap election to take place on November 27. While Grewal was expected to win re-election, Liberal Party officials believed Grewal was vulnerable. The Liberals nominated the 48-year-old Peter Warkentin who had been the nominee in the Langley—Abbotsford electoral district during the 1997 election and in Fraser Valley West during the 1993 election, losing both times. Other candidates who sought election included 20-year-old student Dan Baxter for the Progressive Conservatives, executive assistant Dan Goy for the New Democratic Party, school administrator David Walters for the Green Party, and retiree Harjit Daudharia for the Communist Party. Grewal unexpectedly received a celebrity endorsement from Olympic wrestler Daniel Igali. Grewal won re-election but his party again formed the official opposition to the Liberal Party who formed another majority government.

2000 Canadian federal election
Party	Candidate	Votes	%	±%	Expenditures
Alliance	Gurmant Grewal	29,812	51.61	+16.94	$62,150
Liberal	Peter Warkentin	19,513	33.78	+4.80	$70,581
Progressive Conservative	Dan Baxter	3,940	6.82	–1.77	$3,774
New Democratic	Dan Goy	3,211	5.56	–8.47	$5,977
Green	David Walters	1,175	2.03	+1.21	$4,129
Communist	Harjit Daudharia	114	0.20	–	$189
Total valid votes/expense limit		57,765	99.66	–	$77,569
Total rejected ballots		196	0.34	–0.39	
Turnout		57,961	59.50	–2.12	
Eligible voters		97,421			
Alliance hold		Swing		+6.07	
Source: Elections Canada

== See also ==
- List of Canadian electoral districts
- Historical federal electoral districts of Canada
