= Abbotsford (electoral district) =

Defunct federal electoral district in British Columbia, Canada

Coordinates: 49.0942°N 122.2673°W

British Columbia electoral district
- Boundaries relative to other Lower Mainland ridings

Defunct federal electoral district
- Legislature: House of Commons
- District created: 2003
- District abolished: 2023
- First contested: 2004
- Last contested: 2021
- District webpage: profile, map

Demographics
- Population (2016): 101,814
- Electors (2019): 74,814
- Area (km²): 176
- Census division: Fraser Valley
- Census subdivision(s): Abbotsford, Fraser Valley H Electoral Area, Matsqui Main 2, Upper Sumas 6

Abbotsford is a former federal electoral district in British Columbia, Canada, that was represented in the House of Commons of Canada from 2004 to 2025.

== Demographics ==
Panethnic groups in Abbotsford (2011−2021)
Panethnic group	2021		2016		2011	
Panethnic group	Pop.	%	Pop.	%	Pop.	%
European (Note: Statistic includes all persons that did not make up part of a visible minority or an indigenous identity.)	66,245	61.35%	68,105	68.47%	69,855	73.82%
South Asian	24,185	22.4%	17,005	17.1%	13,955	14.75%
Indigenous	5,810	5.38%	5,585	5.62%	3,920	4.14%
East Asian (Note: Statistic includes total responses of "Chinese", "Korean", and "Japanese" under visible minority section on census.)	3,520	3.26%	3,335	3.35%	3,040	3.21%
Southeast Asian (Note: Statistic includes total responses of "Filipino" and "Southeast Asian" under visible minority section on census.)	3,450	3.19%	2,170	2.18%	1,355	1.43%
African	1,570	1.45%	1,135	1.14%	825	0.87%
Latin American	1,170	1.08%	910	0.91%	595	0.63%
Middle Eastern (Note: Statistic includes total responses of "West Asian" and "Arab" under visible minority section on census.)	1,080	1%	480	0.48%	345	0.36%
Other (Note: Statistic includes total responses of "Visible minority, n.i.e." and "Multiple visible minorities" under visible minority section on census.)	960	0.89%	720	0.72%	730	0.77%
Total responses	107,985	97.87%	99,460	97.69%	94,625	97.48%
Total population	110,331	100%	101,814	100%	97,076	100%
Notes: Totals greater than 100% due to multiple origin responses. Demographics based on 2012 Canadian federal electoral redistribution riding boundaries.

The riding has the lowest proportion of Catholics in Canada, with just 10.6% of the population adhering to Catholicism., as well as the highest proportion (9.8%) of "Christian, not included elsewhere" (non-Protestant, non-Catholic, non-Orthodox). 12.2% of its population claim Dutch ethnic origin, the highest such figure for any Canadian federal riding.

== Geography ==
As of the 2012 federal electoral boundaries redistribution, the district includes the southeastern portion of the City of Abbotsford and the Upper Sumas 6 Indian reserve.

== History ==
The electoral district was created in 2003. 56.1% of the riding was taken from Fraser Valley riding, and 43.9% from Langley—Abbotsford.

The 2012 federal electoral boundaries redistribution concluded that the electoral boundaries of Abbotsford should be adjusted, and a modified electoral district of the same name will be contested in future elections. The redefined Abbotsford loses portions of its current territory in the north and west to the new districts of Mission—Matsqui—Fraser Canyon and Langley—Aldergrove. These new boundaries were legally defined in the 2013 representation order, which came into effect upon the call of the 42nd Canadian federal election, scheduled for October 2015.

The 2015 Canadian general election marked the first time a Conservative candidate was elected in Abbotsford with less than 50% of the popular vote.

Under the 2022 Canadian federal electoral redistribution the riding will be replaced by Abbotsford—South Langley.

=== Historical boundaries ===
2003 representation order

2013 representation order

== Members of Parliament ==
This riding has elected the following members of Parliament:

Parliament	Years	Member	Party
Abbotsford; Riding created from Fraser Valley and Langley—Abbotsford
38th	2004–2006	Randy White	Conservative
39th	2006–2008	Ed Fast	Conservative
40th	2008–2011	Ed Fast	Conservative
41st	2011–2015	Ed Fast	Conservative
42nd	2015–2019	Ed Fast	Conservative
43rd	2019–2021	Ed Fast	Conservative
44th	2021–2025	Ed Fast	Conservative
Riding dissolved into Abbotsford—South Langley and Mission—Matsqui—Abbotsford

== Election results ==
Graph of election results in Abbotsford (minor parties that never got 2% of the vote or didn't run consistently are omitted) View source data.

2021 Canadian federal election
Party	Candidate	Votes	%	±%	Expenditures
Conservative	Ed Fast	21,597	47.94	–3.48	$80,050.56
Liberal	Navreen Gill	10,907	24.21	+2.63	$59,443.92
New Democratic	Dharmasena Yakandawela	7,729	17.16	+0.28	$2,346.91
People's	Kevin Sinclair	3,300	7.33	+5.31	$10,790.83
Green	Stephen Fowler	1,517	3.37	–4.20	none listed
Total valid votes/expense limit		45,050	99.19	–	$109,157.15
Total rejected ballots		370	0.81	–0.00	
Turnout		45,420	59.43	–5.94	
Eligible voters		76,429			
Conservative hold		Swing		–3.06	
Source: Elections Canada

2019 Canadian federal election
Party	Candidate	Votes	%	±%	Expenditures
Conservative	Ed Fast	25,162	51.42	+3.15	$69,612.06
Liberal	Seamus Heffernan	10,560	21.58	–11.21	$22,436.34
New Democratic	Madeleine Sauve	8,257	16.87	+3.17	$4,143.63
Green	Stephen Fowler	3,702	7.57	+2.55	$575.00
People's	Locke Duncan	985	2.01	–	$4,252.19
Christian Heritage	Aeriol Alderking	270	0.55	–	$2,409.11
Total valid votes/expense limit		48,936	99.18	–	$105,365.70
Total rejected ballots		403	0.82	+0.40	
Turnout		49,339	65.37	–4.36	
Eligible voters		75,474			
Conservative hold		Swing		+7.18	
Source: Elections Canada

2015 Canadian federal election
Party	Candidate	Votes	%	±%	Expenditures
Conservative	Ed Fast	23,229	48.27	–18.61	$76,055.10
Liberal	Peter Njenga	15,777	32.78	+24.08	$14,078.53
New Democratic	Jen Martel	6,593	13.70	–5.54	$11,592.31
Green	Stephen Fowler	2,416	5.02	+0.37	$2,578.52
Marxist–Leninist	David MacKay	109	0.23	–0.30	none listed
Total valid votes/expense limit		48,124	99.58	–	$202,055.26
Total rejected ballots		202	0.42	–	
Turnout		48,326	69.74	–	
Eligible voters		69,299			
Conservative hold		Swing		–21.35	
Source: Elections Canada

2011 federal election redistributed results
Party	Vote	%
Conservative	25,060	66.88
New Democratic	7,209	19.24
Liberal	3,260	8.70
Green	1,744	4.65
Marxist-Leninist	196	0.52

2011 Canadian federal election
Party	Candidate	Votes	%	±%	Expenditures
Conservative	Ed Fast	32,493	65.02	+1.71	$71,090.29
New Democratic	David Alan Murray	10,089	20.19	+6.96	$16,401.57
Liberal	Madeleine Hardin	4,968	9.94	–6.34	$30,054.03
Green	Daniel Bryce	2,138	4.28	–2.17	$775.01
Marxist–Leninist	David MacKay	286	0.57	–	none listed
Total valid votes/expense limit		49,974	99.55	–	$90,794.63
Total rejected ballots		225	0.45	–0.07	
Turnout		50,199	58.96	–0.54	
Eligible voters		85,143			
Conservative hold		Swing		–2.64	
Source: Elections Canada

2008 Canadian federal election
Party	Candidate	Votes	%	±%	Expenditures
Conservative	Ed Fast	30,853	63.32	+0.04	$75,853.02
Liberal	Lionel Dominique Traverse	7,933	16.28	+3.60	$53,185.63
New Democratic	Bonnie Rai	6,444	13.22	–3.76	$4,732.22
Green	Karen Durant	3,141	6.45	+0.63	$833.57
Marijuana	Tim Felger	358	0.74	+0.03	none listed
Total valid votes/expense limit		48,729	99.48	–	$86,855.46
Total rejected ballots		256	0.52	+0.14	
Turnout		48,985	59.50	–0.84	
Eligible voters		82,332			
Conservative hold		Swing		–1.78	
Source: Elections Canada

2006 Canadian federal election
Party	Candidate	Votes	%	±%	Expenditures
Conservative	Ed Fast	29,825	63.27	+1.90	$68,206.47
New Democratic	Jeffrey Hansen-Carlson	8,004	16.98	+3.34	$6,955.62
Liberal	David Oliver	5,976	12.68	–7.27	$22,522.38
Green	Stephanie Ashley-Pryce	2,740	5.81	+2.93	$320.72
Marijuana	Tim Felger	334	0.71	–0.13	none listed
Canadian Action	Richard Gebert	173	0.37	–	$80.13
Marxist–Leninist	David MacKay	86	0.18	+0.08	none listed
Total valid votes/expense limit		47,138	99.61	–	$79,106.16
Total rejected ballots		183	0.39	+0.01	
Turnout		47,321	60.33	–4.24	
Eligible voters		78,433			
Conservative hold		Swing		–0.72	
Note: David Oliver was registered as the Liberal candidate, but lost the support of the Liberal Party, and would not have sat with the Liberal caucus had he been he be elected until cleared of allegations made by the NDP candidate.
Source: Elections Canada

2004 Canadian federal election
Party	Candidate	Votes	%	±%	Expenditures
Conservative	Randy White	29,587	61.37	–	$66,142.97
Liberal	Moe Gill	9,617	19.95	–	$41,240.27
New Democratic	Scott Fast	6,575	13.64	–	$6,979.90
Green	Karl Hann	1,389	2.88	–	$539.80
Christian Heritage	Harold J. Ludwig	585	1.21	–	$2,442.88
Marijuana	Tim Felger	404	0.84	–	$9,999.29
Marxist–Leninist	David MacKay	51	0.11	–	none listed
Total valid votes/expense limit		48,208	99.62	–	$75,518.93
Total rejected ballots		182	0.38	–	
Turnout		48,390	64.57	–	
Eligible voters		74,939			
Conservative notional hold		Swing		–	
Note: Change based on redistributed results. Conservative change based on combined total of the Canadian Alliance and the Progressive Conservative Party.
Source: Elections Canada

== See also ==
- List of Canadian electoral districts
- Historical federal electoral districts of Canada
