= Surrey—White Rock—North Delta =

Former federal electoral district in British Columbia, Canada

Coordinates: 49.122°N 122.905°W

Surrey—White Rock—North Delta was a federal electoral district in British Columbia, Canada, that was represented in the House of Commons of Canada from 1979 to 1988. This riding was created in 1976 from parts of Burnaby—Richmond—Delta and Surrey—White Rock ridings.

It was abolished in 1987 when it was redistributed into Delta, Surrey North and Surrey—White Rock ridings.

== Election results ==
1984 Canadian federal election
Party	Candidate	Votes	%	±%
Progressive Conservative	Benno Friesen	39,544	53.58	+4.67
New Democratic	Mike Villeneuve	22,555	30.56	–2.54
Liberal	Reni Masi	10,747	14.56	–2.40
Rhinoceros	Monty Zuliniak	481	0.65	–0.11
Green	Dietmar Hartl	315	0.43	–
Communist	Ray Viaud	155	0.21	+0.07
Total valid votes		73,797	99.74	
Total rejected ballots		193	0.26	+0.08
Turnout		73,990	77.08	+4.42
Eligible voters		95,987		
Progressive Conservative hold		Swing		+3.61
Source: Elections Canada

1980 Canadian federal election
Party	Candidate	Votes	%	±%
Progressive Conservative	Benno Friesen	28,151	48.92	–3.63
New Democratic	Carol Langford	19,051	33.10	+1.60
Liberal	Reni Masi	9,759	16.96	+1.48
Rhinoceros	Albert The Cad Courchene	440	0.76	–
Communist	Vi Swann	82	0.14	–0.25
Marxist–Leninist	Sewa Birring	65	0.11	+0.04
Total valid votes		57,548	99.82	
Total rejected ballots		103	0.18	–0.08
Turnout		57,651	72.66	–5.48
Eligible voters		79,342		
Progressive Conservative hold		Swing		–2.62
Source: Elections Canada

1979 Canadian federal election
Party	Candidate	Votes	%	±%
Progressive Conservative	Benno Friesen	30,009	52.55	–
New Democratic	Carol Langford	17,992	31.51	–
Liberal	Bob Jacobs	8,837	15.48	–
Communist	Fred Bianco	225	0.39	–
Marxist–Leninist	Sewa Birring	40	0.07	–
Total valid votes		57,103	99.74	
Total rejected ballots		150	0.26	–
Turnout		57,253	78.14	–
Eligible voters		73,266		
Source: Elections Canada

== See also ==
- List of Canadian electoral districts
- Historical federal electoral districts of Canada
