= Tako van Popta =

Canadian politician (born 1953)

Tako van Popta MP
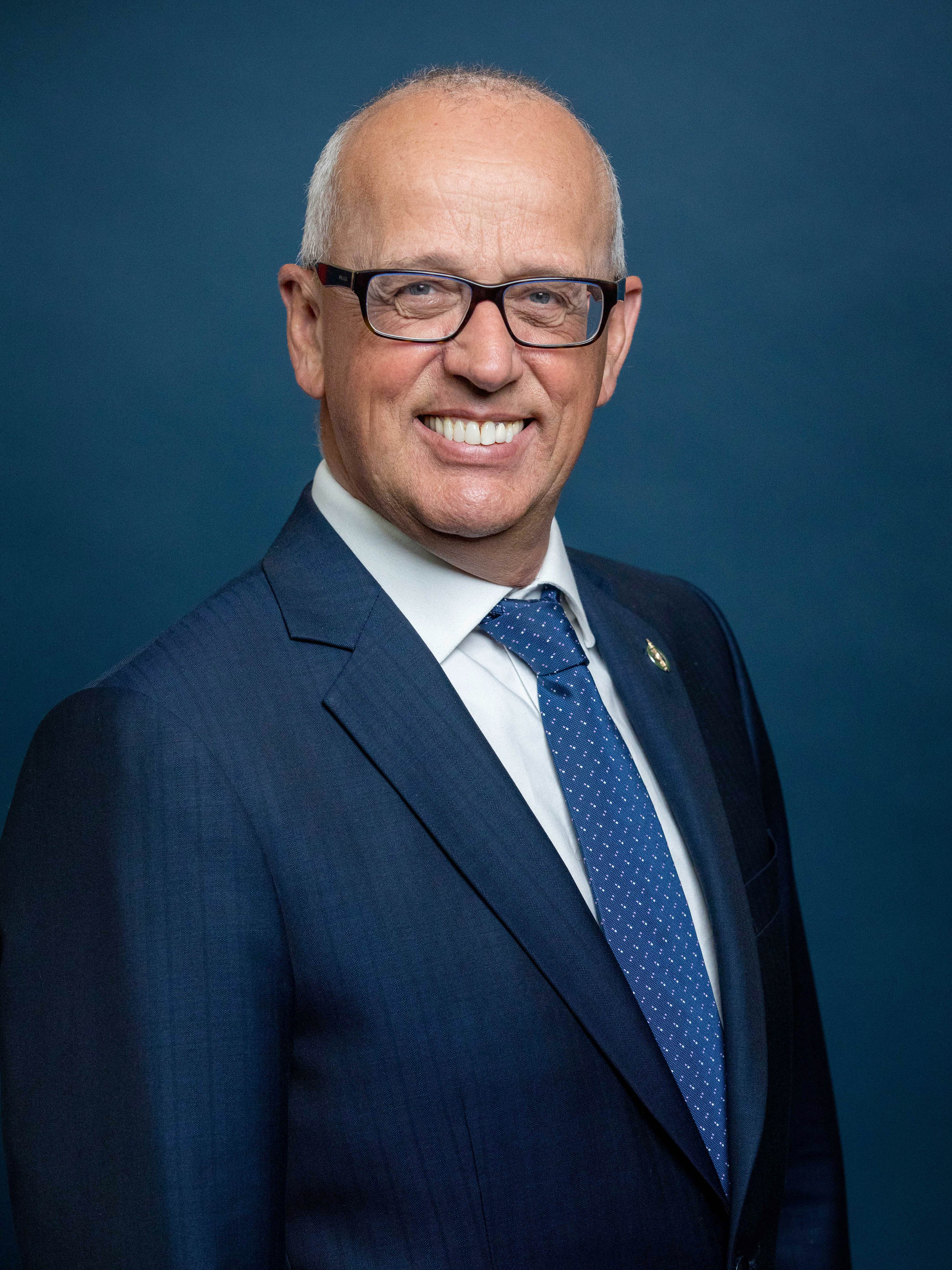
- Van Popta in 2021

Member of Parliament for: Langley Township—Fraser Heights; Langley—Aldergrove (2019–2025)
- Incumbent
- Assumed office October 21, 2019
- Preceded by: Mark Warawa

Personal details
- Born: May 29, 1953 (age 73) Edmonton, Alberta, Canada
- Party: Conservative Party of Canada
- Relations: Misty Van Popta
- Education: Trinity Western University; University of British Columbia
- Profession: Lawyer

Tako J. van Popta MP (born May 29, 1953) is a Canadian lawyer and politician of the Conservative Party who was elected to represent the riding of Langley—Aldergrove in the House of Commons in the 2019 federal election, and was re-elected in 2021. In 2025, he was re-elected in the renamed riding of Langley Township—Fraser Heights.

== Background ==
Van Popta received his undergraduate degree from Trinity Western University and attended UBC to obtain his law degree. He articled with McQuarrie Hunter LLP and worked with the firm for over 30 years, eventually becoming managing partner and overseeing the growth that would lead to McQuarrie Hunter becoming one of the largest law firms south of the Fraser. Van Popta has also held the position of director at the Surrey Board of Trade and the Downtown Surrey Business Improvement Association.

At the time of the 2025 Canadian federal election, he lived in Langley.

== Political career ==
=== 43rd Canadian Parliament (2019–2021) ===
Following the resignation of his predecessor, Mark Warawa, Van Popta won the nomination race and was named the Conservative candidate for Langley Aldergrove.

Following his victory, Van Popta was appointed as a member to the Standing Committee on Public Safety and National Security.

=== 44th Canadian Parliament (2021–present) ===
Van Popta was re-elected for a second term in the 2021 Canadian federal election.

During the 2022 Conservative Party of Canada leadership election, Van Popta endorsed future party leader Pierre Poilievre. Following his leadership victory, Poilievre appointed Van Popta to the role of shadow minister for Pacific economic development.

Van Popta is also member of the Standing Committee on Justice and Human Rights.

== Electoral record ==
2025 Canadian federal election: Langley Township—Fraser Heights
Party	Candidate	Votes	%	±%	Expenditures
Conservative	Tako van Popta	33,574	51.37	+7.45	$55,615.96
Liberal	John Aldag	28,034	42.89	+13.31	$58,816.72
New Democratic	Holly Isaac	2,611	3.99	–15.54	$45.29
Green	Debora Soutar	491	0.75	–1.67	$178.81
Libertarian	Alex Joehl	347	0.53	–	none listed
People's	Sepehr Haghighat	303	0.46	–4.04	$315.59
Total valid votes/expense limit		65,360	99.41	–	$137,739.68
Total rejected ballots		389	0.59	+0.10	
Turnout		65,749	70.57	+5.92	
Eligible voters		93,162			
Conservative notional hold		Swing		–2.93	
Source: Elections Canada

2021 Canadian federal election: Langley—Aldergrove
Party	Candidate	Votes	%	±%	Expenditures
Conservative	Tako van Popta	28,643	45.73	–1.27	$60,616.81
Liberal	Kim Richter	16,565	26.45	+0.83	$81,573.28
New Democratic	Michael Chang	12,288	19.62	+2.77	$46,572.61
People's	Rayna Boychuk	3,341	5.33	+3.28	$5,255.86
Green	Kaija Farstad	1,798	2.87	–4.82	$535.00
Total valid votes/expense limit		62,635	99.50	–	$124,019.67
Total rejected ballots		312	0.50	–0.09	
Turnout		62,947	64.66	–3.60	
Eligible voters		97,353			
Conservative hold		Swing		–1.05	
Source: Elections Canada

2019 Canadian federal election: Langley—Aldergrove
Party	Candidate	Votes	%	±%	Expenditures
Conservative	Tako van Popta	29,823	47.00	+1.37	$55,979.05
Liberal	Leon Jensen	16,254	25.62	–10.94	$23,481.19
New Democratic	Stacey Wakelin	10,690	16.85	+4.34	$13,995.90
Green	Kaija Farstad	4,881	7.69	+3.28	$1,871.90
People's	Natalie Dipietra-Cudmore	1,305	2.06	–	none listed
Libertarian	Alex Joehl	499	0.79	–0.11	$549.66
Total valid votes/expense limit		63,452	99.42	–	$117,365.03
Total rejected ballots		373	0.58	+0.24	
Turnout		63,825	68.26	–4.09	
Eligible voters		93,499			
Conservative hold		Swing		+6.15	
Source: Elections Canada
