= Ed Fast =

Canadian politician (born 1955)

The Honourable Ed Fast PC KC
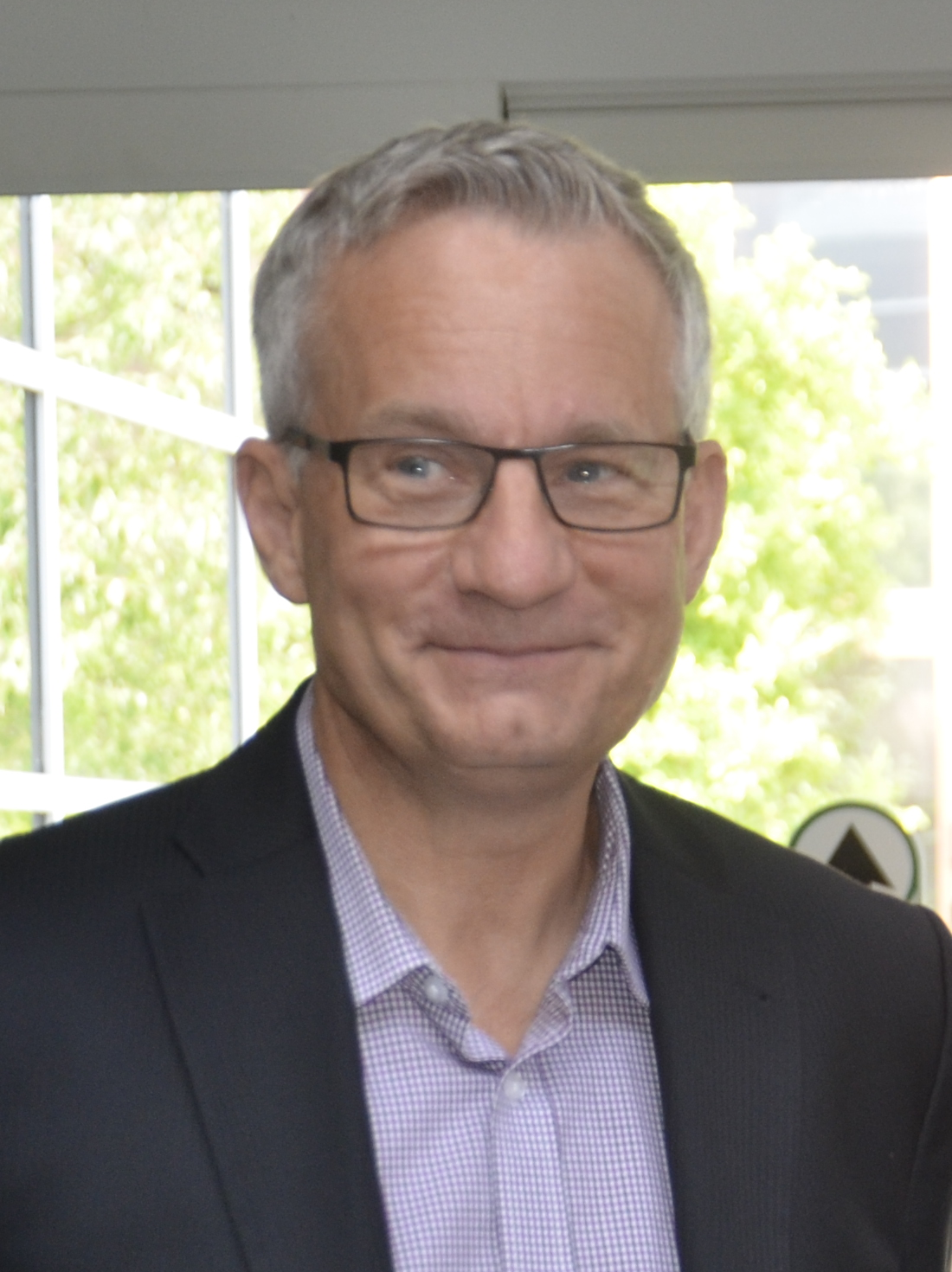

Shadow Minister of Finance
- In office February 22, 2022 – May 18, 2022
- Leader: Candice Bergen
- Preceded by: Pierre Poilievre
- Succeeded by: Pierre Poilievre
- In office February 10, 2021 – November 9, 2021
- Leader: Erin O'Toole
- Preceded by: Pierre Poilievre
- Succeeded by: Pierre Poilievre

Minister of International Trade
- In office May 18, 2011 – November 4, 2015
- Prime Minister: Stephen Harper
- Preceded by: Peter Van Loan
- Succeeded by: Chrystia Freeland

Member of Parliament for Abbotsford
- In office January 23, 2006 – March 23, 2025
- Preceded by: Randy White
- Succeeded by: Riding dissolved

Personal details
- Born: June 18, 1955 (age 71) Winnipeg, Manitoba, Canada
- Party: Conservative
- Spouse: Annette Fast
- Education: University of British Columbia (BA, LLB)

Edward D. Fast PC KC (born June 18, 1955) is a Canadian politician who served as the member of Parliament (MP) for Abbotsford from 2006 to 2025. A member of the Conservative Party, he was Minister for International Trade and Minister for the Asia–Pacific Gateway from 2011 to 2015 under Prime Minister Stephen Harper.

== Early life and career ==
Born in Winnipeg, Manitoba, Ed Fast moved to and grew up in Vancouver, British Columbia. After graduating from law school at the University of British Columbia in 1982, Fast co-founded the law firm currently known as Linley Welwood. He was elected in 1985 and served two terms as an Abbotsford School Board Trustee. He was elected to Abbotsford City Council in 1996 and served for three 3-year terms. During that time, he served as Deputy Mayor and as Chair of the Parks, Recreation & Culture Commission.

== Federal politics ==
=== In government ===
Fast won the 2006 federal election with 63.27% of the vote as the MP for Abbotsford on January 23, 2006. During his first term, Fast was appointed to the Standing Committee of Canadian Heritage and the Standing Committee for Transport, Infrastructure and Communities. Fast was also the Chair of the B.C. Conservative caucus.

In 2006, Fast introduced Private Member's Bill C-277 which doubles from 5 to 10 years in prison the maximum sentence for luring a child over the internet for sexual purposes. The Bill received royal assent on June 22, 2007. Only 2% of private member's bills are ever passed into law.

In the 2008 federal election, Fast received 30,853 votes, 63.3% of the total in Abbotsford. He served as the Chair of the Standing Committee on Justice and Human Rights and as a member of the Copyright Modernization Committee. In May 2009, Fast introduced a motion in the House of Commons to rename the Huntingdon border crossing to "Abbotsford-Huntingdon Port of Entry". The official renaming took place on May 28, 2010, preserving the historical significance of the "Huntingdon" name while at the same time more accurately reflecting the location of the border crossing within the Fraser Valley.

From 2009 to 2011, Fast was the Chair of the Standing Committee on Justice & Human Rights.

==== Minister of International Trade ====
Fast was re-elected in the 2011 federal election with 32,493 votes, representing 65% of the popular vote. On May 18, 2011, Prime Minister Stephen Harper appointed Ed Fast to Cabinet to serve as Canada's Minister of International Trade.

Fast oversaw the negotiations for the Comprehensive Economic and Trade Agreement (CETA) with the European Union, which some saw as a giveaway to big pharma. As part of the newly-elected Liberal government in 2015, Fast's immediate successor Chrystia Freeland one year later finalized the negotiations which had been ongoing since 2009.

Fast was also responsible for the Canada-China Promotion and Reciprocal Protection of Investments Agreement, which was signed in 2012 and came into force on 1 October 2014. This agreement ties Canada "to the terms... for a minimum of 31 years."

On 3 December 2014 Fast announced that the Canada–Korea Free Trade Agreement (CKFTA), Canada's first free trade agreement in the Asia–Pacific region, had received royal assent.

In November 2013, Fast announced the Government of Canada's Global Markets Action Plan, a plan focusing on "Canada's core strengths in priority markets through bold trade policy and vigorous trade promotion". He also released Canada's first International Education Strategy, a part of the Global Markets Action Plan, in order to attract international talent. The CBIE termed it an "ambitious strategy, with a goal to double the number of international students choosing to study here (in Canada) by 2022."

On 9 April 2014, rising on a point of order, New Democratic Party MP Dan Harris accused Fast of making a gun gesture and saying "boom" in the direction of another New Democrat, Niki Ashton, during Question Period. Fast denied the claim and asserted that he was pointing in the direction of Andrew Scheer, the Speaker of the House of Commons. Video from the House of Commons shows Fast making a pointing gesture. After the video circulated, Minister Fast acknowledged that he had made a pointing gesture with his hand, but said that his hand gesture was misinterpreted.

=== Social Issues ===
==== Abortion ====
Ed Fast is anti-abortion. Fast voted in support of Bill C-233 - An Act to amend the Criminal Code (sex-selective abortion), which would restrict abortion access, making it a criminal offence for a medical practitioner to perform an abortion sought solely on the grounds of the child's genetic sex. Abortion Rights Coalition of Canada describes him as an anti-abortion MP.

==== Conversion therapy ====
On June 22, 2021, Fast was one of 63 MPs to vote against Bill C-6, An Act to amend the Criminal Code (conversion therapy), which was passed by majority vote, making certain aspects of conversion therapy a crime, including "causing a child to undergo conversion therapy."

=== In opposition ===
==== 42nd Canadian Parliament ====
Following the Harper government's defeat in 2015, Fast served in the shadow cabinets of Rona Ambrose and Andrew Scheer as the critic to the Minister of Environment and Climate Change.

==== 43rd Canadian Parliament ====
After being re-elected in 2019, Fast declined reappointment to Scheer's shadow cabinet. Scheer was later removed from leadership and replaced by Erin O'Toole, who on 11 February 2021 appointed Fast as his Finance critic. He replaced Pierre Poilievre who became critic for Jobs and Industry.

==== 44th Canadian Parliament ====
Fast was for a brief time a member of the Industry and Technology committee, before he was appointed on 28 February 2022 by new interim CPC leader Candice Bergen to the Finance committee. He resigned as Shadow Finance Minister after criticizing Conservative leadership candidate Pierre Poilievre's plan to fire Bank of Canada director Tiff Macklem, if elected.

== Personal life ==
Ed and his wife Annette have lived in Abbotsford for over 43 years and have four adult daughters and fifteen grandchildren. In December 2016, Fast suffered a stroke, but recovered.

== Electoral record ==
2021 Canadian federal election: Abbotsford
Party	Candidate	Votes	%	±%	Expenditures
Conservative	Ed Fast	21,597	47.94	–3.48	$80,050.56
Liberal	Navreen Gill	10,907	24.21	+2.63	$59,443.92
New Democratic	Dharmasena Yakandawela	7,729	17.16	+0.28	$2,346.91
People's	Kevin Sinclair	3,300	7.33	+5.31	$10,790.83
Green	Stephen Fowler	1,517	3.37	–4.20	none listed
Total valid votes/expense limit		45,050	99.19	–	$109,157.15
Total rejected ballots		370	0.81	–0.00	
Turnout		45,420	59.43	–5.94	
Eligible voters		76,429			
Conservative hold		Swing		–3.06	
Source: Elections Canada

2019 Canadian federal election: Abbotsford
Party	Candidate	Votes	%	±%	Expenditures
Conservative	Ed Fast	25,162	51.42	+3.15	$69,612.06
Liberal	Seamus Heffernan	10,560	21.58	–11.21	$22,436.34
New Democratic	Madeleine Sauve	8,257	16.87	+3.17	$4,143.63
Green	Stephen Fowler	3,702	7.57	+2.55	$575.00
People's	Locke Duncan	985	2.01	–	$4,252.19
Christian Heritage	Aeriol Alderking	270	0.55	–	$2,409.11
Total valid votes/expense limit		48,936	99.18	–	$105,365.70
Total rejected ballots		403	0.82	+0.40	
Turnout		49,339	65.37	–4.36	
Eligible voters		75,474			
Conservative hold		Swing		+7.18	
Source: Elections Canada

2015 Canadian federal election: Abbotsford
Party	Candidate	Votes	%	±%	Expenditures
Conservative	Ed Fast	23,229	48.27	–18.61	$76,055.10
Liberal	Peter Njenga	15,777	32.78	+24.08	$14,078.53
New Democratic	Jen Martel	6,593	13.70	–5.54	$11,592.31
Green	Stephen Fowler	2,416	5.02	+0.37	$2,578.52
Marxist–Leninist	David MacKay	109	0.23	–0.30	none listed
Total valid votes/expense limit		48,124	99.58	–	$202,055.26
Total rejected ballots		202	0.42	–	
Turnout		48,326	69.74	–	
Eligible voters		69,299			
Conservative hold		Swing		–21.35	
Source: Elections Canada

2011 Canadian federal election: Abbotsford
Party	Candidate	Votes	%	±%	Expenditures
Conservative	Ed Fast	32,493	65.02	+1.71	$71,090.29
New Democratic	David Alan Murray	10,089	20.19	+6.96	$16,401.57
Liberal	Madeleine Hardin	4,968	9.94	–6.34	$30,054.03
Green	Daniel Bryce	2,138	4.28	–2.17	$775.01
Marxist–Leninist	David MacKay	286	0.57	–	none listed
Total valid votes/expense limit		49,974	99.55	–	$90,794.63
Total rejected ballots		225	0.45	–0.07	
Turnout		50,199	58.96	–0.54	
Eligible voters		85,143			
Conservative hold		Swing		–2.64	
Source: Elections Canada

2008 Canadian federal election: Abbotsford
Party	Candidate	Votes	%	±%	Expenditures
Conservative	Ed Fast	30,853	63.32	+0.04	$75,853.02
Liberal	Lionel Dominique Traverse	7,933	16.28	+3.60	$53,185.63
New Democratic	Bonnie Rai	6,444	13.22	–3.76	$4,732.22
Green	Karen Durant	3,141	6.45	+0.63	$833.57
Marijuana	Tim Felger	358	0.74	+0.03	none listed
Total valid votes/expense limit		48,729	99.48	–	$86,855.46
Total rejected ballots		256	0.52	+0.14	
Turnout		48,985	59.50	–0.84	
Eligible voters		82,332			
Conservative hold		Swing		–1.78	
Source: Elections Canada

2006 Canadian federal election: Abbotsford
Party	Candidate	Votes	%	±%	Expenditures
Conservative	Ed Fast	29,825	63.27	+1.90	$68,206.47
New Democratic	Jeffrey Hansen-Carlson	8,004	16.98	+3.34	$6,955.62
Liberal	David Oliver	5,976	12.68	–7.27	$22,522.38
Green	Stephanie Ashley-Pryce	2,740	5.81	+2.93	$320.72
Marijuana	Tim Felger	334	0.71	–0.13	none listed
Canadian Action	Richard Gebert	173	0.37	–	$80.13
Marxist–Leninist	David MacKay	86	0.18	+0.08	none listed
Total valid votes/expense limit		47,138	99.61	–	$79,106.16
Total rejected ballots		183	0.39	+0.01	
Turnout		47,321	60.33	–4.24	
Eligible voters		78,433			
Conservative hold		Swing		–0.72	
Note: David Oliver was registered as the Liberal candidate, but lost the support of the Liberal Party, and would not have sat with the Liberal caucus had he been he be elected until cleared of allegations made by the NDP candidate.
Source: Elections Canada

Parliament of Canada
Preceded by Randy White	Member of Parliament for Abbotsford; 2006–2025	Incumbent
28th Canadian Ministry (2006–2015) – Cabinet of Stephen Harper
Cabinet posts (2)
Predecessor	Office	Successor
John Baird	Minister of Foreign Affairs; 2015; Acting	Rob Nicholson
Peter Van Loan	Minister of International Trade; 2011–2015	Chrystia Freeland
