= Langley (federal electoral district) =

Former federal electoral district in British Columbia, Canada

Coordinates: 49°4′22.5″N 122°33′47″W

British Columbia electoral district
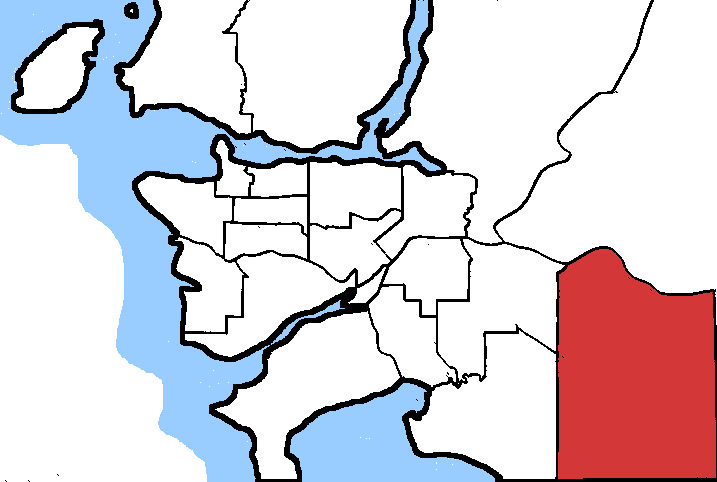
- Langley in relation to other British Columbia federal electoral districts

Defunct federal electoral district
- Legislature: House of Commons
- District created: 2003
- First contested: 2004
- Last contested: 2011
- District webpage: profile, map

Demographics
- Population (2011): 129,824
- Electors (2011): 85,861
- Area (km²): 320.62
- Census division: Greater Vancouver
- Census subdivision: Langley

Langley was a federal electoral district in the province of British Columbia, Canada, that was represented in the House of Commons of Canada from 2004 to 2015. It was a 327 km^{2} in area with 117,858 people located in the suburbs of the Lower Mainland.

== History ==
The electoral district was created in the 2003 Representation Order with 82,070 people from the former riding of Langley—Abbotsford, and 28,976 people from South Surrey—White Rock—Langley. This new riding includes the City of Langley, the Township of Langley, and the Indian reserves of Katzie IR No. 2, Matsqui IR No. 4 and McMillan Island IR No. 6.

As per the 2012 electoral redistribution, this riding was dissolved into Langley—Aldergrove and Cloverdale—Langley City for the 2015 election.

== Members of Parliament ==
Parliament	Years	Member	Party
Riding created from Langley—Abbotsford and South Surrey—White Rock—Langley
38th	2004–2006	Mark Warawa	Conservative
39th	2006–2008	Mark Warawa	Conservative
40th	2008–2011	Mark Warawa	Conservative
41st	2011–2015	Mark Warawa	Conservative
Riding to be dissolved into Langley—Aldergrove and Cloverdale—Langley City

Its Member of Parliament was Mark Warawa, a former loss prevention officer. He was first elected in the 2004 election. He is a member of the Conservative Party of Canada caucus. He serves as a member on the Legislative Committee on Bill C-38 and the Standing Committee on Justice, Human Rights, Public Safety and Emergency Preparedness. During the 40th Parliament, he was the parliamentary secretary to the Minister of the Environment and served as a member of the Standing Committee on Environment and Sustainable Development. Warawa died from pancreatic cancer on June 20, 2019. No by-election was held before the 2019 Canadian federal election.

== Election results ==
2011 Canadian federal election
Party	Candidate	Votes	%	±%	Expenditures
Conservative	Mark Warawa	35,569	64.52	+3.06	$53,674.26
New Democratic	Piotr Majkowski	11,277	20.45	+3.68	$16,204.01
Liberal	Rebecca Darnell	4,990	9.05	–2.05	$37,041.64
Green	Carey Ann Poitras	2,943	5.34	–4.20	$4,855.42
Pirate	Craig Nobbs	353	0.64	–	none listed
Total valid votes/expense limit		55,132	99.71	–	$93,931.03
Total rejected ballots		158	0.29	+0.01	
Turnout		55,290	61.28	–0.66	
Eligible voters		90,225			
Conservative hold		Swing		–0.30	
Source: Elections Canada

2008 Canadian federal election
Party	Candidate	Votes	%	±%	Expenditures
Conservative	Mark Warawa	32,594	61.46	+8.89	$41,224.16
New Democratic	Andrew Claxton	8,898	16.78	–1.61	$4,824.36
Liberal	Jake Gray	5,888	11.10	–11.99	$4,003.68
Green	Patrick Meyer	5,059	9.54	+3.98	$3,579.97
Christian Heritage	Ron Gray	594	1.12	–	$7,887.94
Total valid votes/expense limit		53,033	99.72	–	$88,558.44
Total rejected ballots		147	0.28	+0.06	
Turnout		53,180	61.94	–4.15	
Eligible voters		85,861			
Conservative hold		Swing		+5.24	
Source: Elections Canada

2006 Canadian federal election
Party	Candidate	Votes	%	±%	Expenditures
Conservative	Mark Warawa	28,577	52.57	+4.88	$51,045.03
Liberal	Bill Brooks	12,553	23.09	–1.64	$22,910.17
New Democratic	Angel Claypool	9,993	18.38	+1.63	$5,097.58
Green	Patrick Meyer	3,023	5.56	–0.52	$1,017.85
Canadian Action	Vicki Lee Sloan	211	0.39	–	$405.87
Total valid votes/expense limit		54,357	99.79	–	$81,202.05
Total rejected ballots		116	0.21	–0.04	
Turnout		54,473	66.08	+0.68	
Eligible voters		82,432			
Conservative hold		Swing		+3.26	
Source: Elections Canada

2004 Canadian federal election
Party	Candidate	Votes	%	Expenditures
Conservative	Mark Warawa	24,390	47.70	$55,161.76
Liberal	Kim Richter	12,649	24.74	$17,548.77
New Democratic	Dean Morrison	8,568	16.75	$3,207.19
Green	Patrick Meyer	3,108	6.08	$3,130.27
Independent	Mel Kositsky	2,422	4.74	$15,219.96
Total valid votes/expense limit		51,137	99.74	$77,482.18
Total rejected ballots		131	0.26	
Turnout		51,268	65.40	
Eligible voters		78,394		
Conservative notional gain		Swing		–
This riding was created from parts of Langley—Abbotsford and South Surrey—White Rock—Langley, both of which elected a Canadian Alliance candidate in the previous election.
Source: Elections Canada

== See also ==
- List of Canadian electoral districts
- Historical federal electoral districts of Canada
