= Langley Township—Fraser Heights =

Federal electoral district in British Columbia, Canada

British Columbia electoral district
- Interactive map of riding boundaries from the 2025 federal election

Federal electoral district
- Legislature: House of Commons
MP
Tako van Popta
Conservative
- District created: 2013
- First contested: 2015
- Last contested: 2025
- District webpage: profile, map

Demographics
- Population (2011): 103,084
- Electors (2015): 80,360
- Area (km²): 382
- Pop. density (per km²): 269.9
- Census division(s): Fraser Valley, Metro Vancouver
- Census subdivision(s): Surrey (part), Langley (part), McMillan Island, Barnston Island, Katzie

Langley Township—Fraser Heights is a federal electoral district in British Columbia.

From 2015 to 2025, the district was known as Langley—Aldergrove. It was renamed by the 2022 federal electoral boundaries redistribution and was legally defined in the 2023 representation order. It came into effect upon the call of the 2025 Canadian federal election.

== Demographics ==
Panethnic groups in Langley—Aldergrove (2011−2021)
Panethnic group	2021		2016		2011	
Panethnic group	Pop.	%	Pop.	%	Pop.	%
European (Note: Statistic includes all persons that did not make up part of a visible minority or an indigenous identity.)	90,600	69.04%	88,650	76.94%	83,885	82.75%
East Asian (Note: Statistic includes total responses of "Chinese", "Korean", and "Japanese" under visible minority section on census.)	13,175	10.04%	8,490	7.37%	5,940	5.86%
South Asian	10,950	8.34%	6,630	5.75%	3,885	3.83%
Indigenous	5,155	3.93%	4,620	4.01%	3,660	3.61%
Southeast Asian (Note: Statistic includes total responses of "Filipino" and "Southeast Asian" under visible minority section on census.)	4,900	3.73%	3,260	2.83%	2,010	1.98%
Latin American	1,715	1.31%	1,055	0.92%	540	0.53%
African	1,525	1.16%	1,215	1.05%	495	0.49%
Middle Eastern (Note: Statistic includes total responses of "West Asian" and "Arab" under visible minority section on census.)	1,455	1.11%	630	0.55%	400	0.39%
Other (Note: Statistic includes total responses of "Visible minority, n.i.e." and "Multiple visible minorities" under visible minority section on census.)	1,750	1.33%	655	0.57%	555	0.55%
Total responses	131,220	98.54%	115,220	98.46%	101,370	98.34%
Total population	133,168	100%	117,017	100%	103,084	100%
Notes: Totals greater than 100% due to multiple origin responses. Demographics based on 2012 Canadian federal electoral redistribution riding boundaries.

== Members of Parliament ==
This riding has elected the following members of the House of Commons of Canada:

Parliament	Years	Member	Party
Langley—Aldergrove; Riding created from Abbotsford and Langley
42nd	2015–2019	Mark Warawa	Conservative
43rd	2019–2021	Tako van Popta	Conservative
44th	2021–2025	Tako van Popta	Conservative
Langley Township—Fraser Heights
45th	2025–present	Tako van Popta	Conservative

== Election results ==
Graph of election results in Langley—Aldergrove (minor parties that never got 2% of the vote or didn't run consistently are omitted)

=== Langley Township—Fraser Heights, 2023 representation order ===
2025 Canadian federal election
** Preliminary results — Not yet official **
Party	Candidate	Votes	%	±%	Expenditures
Conservative	Tako van Popta	33,595	51.13	+7.21	
Liberal	John Aldag	28,034	42.67	+13.09	
New Democratic	Holly Isaac	2,611	3.97	–15.56	
People's	Sepehr Haghighat	629	0.96	–3.54	
Green	Debora Soutar	491	0.75	–1.67	
Libertarian	Alex Joehl	347	0.53	N/A	
Total valid votes/expense limit					
Total rejected ballots					
Turnout		65,707	71.10		
Eligible voters		92,415			
Conservative notional hold		Swing		–2.94	
Source: Elections Canada

2021 federal election redistributed results
Party	Vote	%
Conservative	23,223	43.92
Liberal	15,639	29.58
New Democratic	10,326	19.53
People's	2,382	4.50
Green	1,278	2.42
Others	27	0.05

=== Langley—Aldergrove, 2013 representation order ===
2021 Canadian federal election: Langley—Aldergrove
Party	Candidate	Votes	%	±%	Expenditures
Conservative	Tako van Popta	28,643	45.7	-1.3	$60,626.81
Liberal	Kim Richter	16,565	26.4	+0.8	$81,572.98
New Democratic	Michael Chang	12,288	19.6	+2.7	$46,572.61
People's	Rayna Boychuk	3,341	5.3	+3.2	$5,255.86
Green	Kaija Farstad	1,798	2.9	-4.8	$535.00
Total valid votes/expense limit		62,635	99.5	–	$124,019.67
Total rejected ballots		312	0.5		
Turnout		62,947	65.0		
Eligible voters		96,828			
Conservative hold		Swing		-1.1	
Source: Elections Canada

2019 Canadian federal election: Langley—Aldergrove
Party	Candidate	Votes	%	±%	Expenditures
Conservative	Tako van Popta	29,823	47.00	+1.37	$59,992.85
Liberal	Leon Jensen	16,254	25.62	-10.94	$23,481.19
New Democratic	Stacey Wakelin	10,690	16.85	+4.34	none listed
Green	Kaija Farstad	4,881	7.69	+3.28	none listed
People's	Natalie Dipietra-Cudmore	1,305	2.06	-	none listed
Libertarian	Alex Joehl	499	0.79	-0.11	$549.66
Total valid votes/expense limit		63,452	99.42		
Total rejected ballots		373	0.58	+0.24	
Turnout		63,825	68.26	-4.09	
Eligible voters		93,499			
Conservative hold		Swing		+6.15	
Source: Elections Canada

2015 Canadian federal election: Langley—Aldergrove
Party	Candidate	Votes	%	±%	Expenditures
Conservative	Mark Warawa	27,333	45.63	-20.18	$61,767.47
Liberal	Leon Jensen	21,894	36.55	+27.57	$10,415.63
New Democratic	Margot Sangster	7,490	12.51	-6.84	$13,300.01
Green	Simmi Kaur Dhillon	2,644	4.41	-0.85	$2,699.50
Libertarian	Lauren Southern	535	0.89		–
Total valid votes/expense limit		59,896	99.66		$217,657.94
Total rejected ballots		204	0.34	–	
Turnout		60,100	72.35	–	
Eligible voters		83,065			
Conservative hold		Swing		-23.88	
Source: Elections Canada

2011 federal election redistributed results
Party	Vote	%
Conservative	29,384	65.8
New Democratic	8,638	19.4
Liberal	4,009	9.0
Green	2,349	5.3
Others	264	0.6

== See also ==
- List of Canadian electoral districts
- Historical federal electoral districts of Canada
