= Surrey—White Rock—South Langley =

Former federal electoral district in British Columbia, Canada

Coordinates: 49°1′11.7″N 122°48′9.4″W

British Columbia electoral district

Defunct federal electoral district
- Legislature: House of Commons
- District created: 1966
- District abolished: 1996
- First contested: 1968
- Last contested: 1993

Surrey—White Rock—South Langley (formerly known as Surrey—White Rock, South Surrey—White Rock and Surrey) was a federal electoral district in British Columbia, Canada, that was represented in the House of Commons of Canada from 1968 to 1979 and from 1988 to 1997.

== Geography ==
This electoral district included the City of White Rock, the southern portions of the Township of Langley, and the City of Surrey.

== History ==
This riding was created in 1966 as "Surrey" from New Westminster riding.

In 1971, it was renamed “Surrey—White Rock".

In 1976, Surrey—White Rock was abolished and redistributed into Fraser Valley West and Surrey—White Rock—North Delta ridings.

The riding was re-created in 1987 as "Surrey—White Rock" from Fraser Valley West and Surrey—White Rock—North Delta ridings.

In 1990, it was renamed "Surrey—White Rock—South Langley".

In 1996, it was abolished, with parts of it going to form the ridings of South Surrey—White Rock—Langley, Surrey Central and Langley—Abbotsford.

== Members of Parliament ==
This riding elected the following members of Parliament:

Parliament	Years	Member	Party
Surrey; Riding created from New Westminster
28th	1968–1972	Barry Mather	New Democratic
Surrey—White Rock
29th	1972–1974	Barry Mather	New Democratic
30th	1974–1979	Benno Friesen	Progressive Conservative
Riding dissolved into Fraser Valley West and Surrey—White Rock—North Delta
Surrey—White Rock; Riding re-created from Fraser Valley West and Surrey—White Rock—North Delta
34th	1988–1993	Benno Friesen	Progressive Conservative
Surrey—White Rock—South Langley
35th	1993–1997	Val Meredith	Reform
Riding dissolved into South Surrey—White Rock—Langley, Surrey Central and Langley—Abbotsford

== Election results ==
=== Surrey—White Rock—South Langley ===
1993 Canadian federal election
Party	Candidate	Votes	%	±%
Reform	Val Meredith	32,918	44.11	+37.80
Liberal	Gordon Hogg	24,683	33.82	+10.33
Progressive Conservative	Norm Blain	8,885	12.17	−31.31
New Democratic	Mota Jheeta	3,029	4.15	−20.18
National	Carolyn Goertzen	2,387	3.27	–
Christian Heritage	Heather Stilwell	877	1.20	−0.20
Green	Steve Chitty	464	0.64	+0.20
Natural Law	Derek Nadeau	251	0.34	–
Marxist–Leninist	Charles Boylan	67	0.09	–
Independent	Rhonda Thiessen	59	0.08	–
Canada Party	Farlie Paynter	56	0.08	–
Commonwealth of Canada	Giancarlo Dalla Valle	35	0.05	–
Total valid votes		72,991	99.54	
Total rejected ballots		334	0.46	
Turnout		73,325	71.77	
Eligible voters		102,164		
Reform gain from Progressive Conservative		Swing		+34.55

=== Surrey—White Rock ===
1988 Canadian federal election
Party	Candidate	Votes	%
Progressive Conservative	Benno Friesen	26,320	43.48
New Democratic	Charan Gill	14,725	24.33
Liberal	Judy Higginbotham	14,217	23.49
Reform	Val Meredith	3,821	6.31
Christian Heritage	Roy Pilkey	846	1.40
Green	Steve Kisby	263	0.43
Libertarian	Joe Kyriakakis	134	0.22
Independent	Bill White	109	0.18
Communist	Viola Swann	97	0.16
Total valid votes		60,532	100.0

=== 1988 ===
1988 Canadian federal election: Surrey—White Rock
Party	Candidate	Votes	%	±%
Progressive Conservative	Benno Friesen	26,320	43.48	+0.00
New Democratic	Charan Gill	14,725	24.33	–
Liberal	Judy Higginbotham	14,217	23.49	–
Reform	Val Meredith	3,821	6.31	–
Christian Heritage	Roy Pilkey	846	1.40	–
Green	Steve Kisby	263	0.43	–
Libertarian	Joseph Kyriakakis	134	0.22	–
Independent	Bill White	109	0.18	–
Communist	Vi Swann	97	0.16	–
Total valid votes		60,532	99.72	
Total rejected ballots		167	0.28	–0.12
Turnout		60,699	79.58	+7.77
Eligible voters		76,270		
This riding was created from parts of Fraser Valley West and Surrey—White Rock—North Delta, both of which elected a Progressive Conservative in the previous election. Benno Friesen was the incumbent from Surrey—White Rock—North Delta.
Source: Elections Canada

1974 Canadian federal election: Surrey—White Rock
Party	Candidate	Votes	%	±%
Progressive Conservative	Benno Friesen	21,537	43.70	+10.52
Liberal	Douglas J. Hovan	13,276	26.94	+9.78
New Democratic	Leonard Friesen	12,935	26.25	–21.15
Social Credit	Tom Kennedy	1,138	2.31	+0.05
Communist	Fred Bianco	260	0.53	–
Independent	Alex V. Barker	80	0.16	–
Marxist–Leninist	Greg Corcoran	53	0.11	–
Total valid votes		49,279	99.61	
Total rejected ballots		193	0.39	–0.40
Turnout		49,472	71.81	–1.91
Eligible voters		68,892		
Progressive Conservative gain from New Democratic		Swing		+15.84
Source: Library of Parliament

1972 Canadian federal election: Surrey—White Rock
Party	Candidate	Votes	%	±%
New Democratic	Barry Mather	21,598	47.40	+2.84
Progressive Conservative	Robert N. Thompson	15,123	33.19	+16.80
Liberal	Ed Carlin	7,819	17.16	–15.16
Social Credit	Ben Schroeder	1,030	2.26	–4.47
Total valid votes		45,570	99.21	
Total rejected ballots		362	0.79	
Turnout		45,932	73.72	
Eligible voters		62,302		
New Democratic hold		Swing		–
Source: Library of Parliament

=== Surrey ===
1968 Canadian federal election: Surrey
Party	Candidate	Votes	%	±%
New Democratic	Barry Mather	16,186	44.56	–
Liberal	Bill Vander Zalm	11,741	32.32	–
Progressive Conservative	Roland John Harvey	5,953	16.39	–
Social Credit	Delbert K. Doll	2,445	6.73	–
Total valid votes		36,325	99.45	
Total rejected ballots		201	0.55	–
Turnout		36,526	74.28	–
Eligible voters		49,172		
Source: Library of Parliament

== See also ==
- List of Canadian electoral districts
- Historical federal electoral districts of Canada
