= Russ Hiebert =

Canadian politician

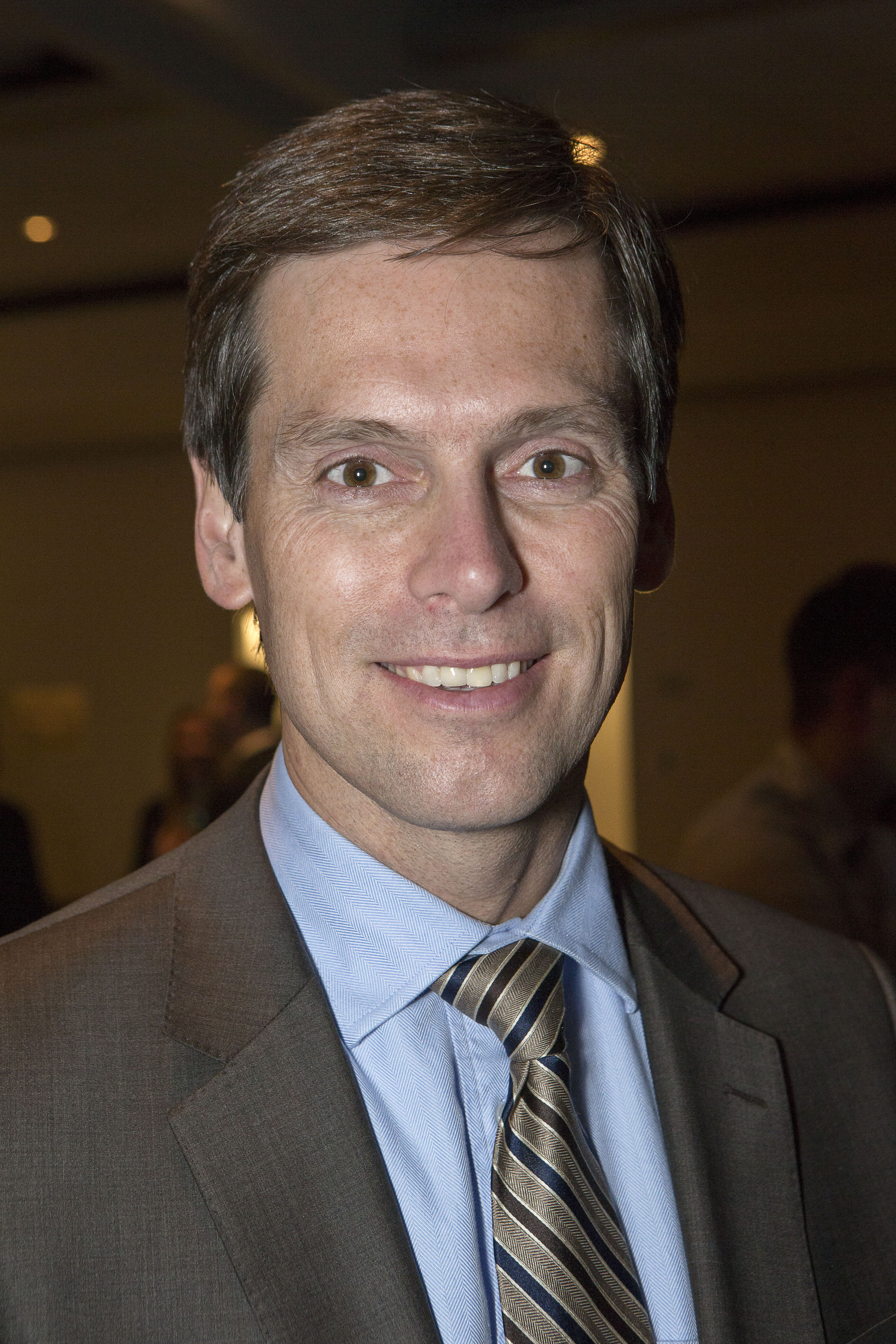

Member of Parliament for South Surrey—White Rock—Cloverdale
- In office 28 June 2004 – 4 August 2015
- Preceded by: new riding
- Succeeded by: riding dissolved

Personal details
- Born: 8 February 1969 (age 57) Steinbach, Manitoba
- Party: Conservative
- Spouse: Andrea Hiebert
- Profession: Lawyer, businessman, politician

Russel "Russ" Hiebert (born 8 February 1969) is a Canadian lawyer, politician and businessman. He was the Member of Parliament in the House of Commons of Canada for South Surrey—White Rock—Cloverdale from 2004 to 2015. He was born in Steinbach, Manitoba. He has a BA from Biola University, and an MBA and LL.B from the University of British Columbia. Hiebert was a practicing lawyer and small businessman prior to entering Parliament. He is married with four children.

== Career ==
In 2004, Hiebert won the Conservative Party of Canada nomination against veteran MP Val Meredith by 80 ballots in a vote by about 850 riding members.

On 28 June 2004, Hiebert was elected to the House of Commons in the 2004 federal election. He ran against Liberal candidate Judy Higginbotham, a veteran Surrey City Councillor, winning by more than 3400 votes. During his first term as MP, Hiebert served on the Ethics and Privacy Committee, founded and co-chaired the all-party Border Caucus, and co-chaired the Conservative Party Task Force on Safe Streets and Healthy Communities.

In the 2006 election, he was re-elected by an increased plurality when he received 47% of the vote; his nearest competitor, Liberal candidate Jim McMurtry, received 31%.

On 8 February 2006, Prime Minister Stephen Harper appointed Hiebert parliamentary secretary to the Minister of National Defence, Gordon O'Connor. Hiebert generated positive headlines in January 2007 when he delivered wheelchairs to a hospital in Kandahar, Afghanistan. While parliamentary secretary he served on the Defence Committee. In June 2006, he was elected by his colleagues from all parties to the chairmanship of the Commonwealth Parliamentary Association. He also continued to serve as Conservative Co-Chairman of the all-party Parliamentary Border Caucus.

On 10 October 2007, Hiebert was appointed as the inaugural parliamentary secretary to the Minister of Intergovernmental Affairs and Minister of Western Economic Diversification, Rona Ambrose. Hiebert was also the leading government member of the Standing Committee on Ethics, Privacy and Access to Information which held hearings on the high-profile Mulroney-Schreiber affair in fall 2007 and spring 2008.

His activities during his third term included leading a parliamentary committee's study into the activities of the Canadian Human Rights Commission, including review of the (now repealed) Section 13 hate speech provisions of the Canadian Human Rights Act. Hiebert served on the Commons Finance Committee, the Natural Resources Committee, and the International Human Rights Sub-Committee.

In the 2011 Canadian federal election, Hiebert won his riding with approximately 54% of the vote. He served on the International Trade Committee. He served one additional term as Canadian Branch Chairman of the Commonwealth Parliamentary Association, serving seven consecutive terms in total. During his career he was also elected to serve two, three-year terms as the Canadian representative on the international executive of the CPA.

Hiebert's Private Members Bill, C-377, requiring labour unions to publicly disclose their finances was signed into law by Governor-General David Johnston on 30 June 2015 - the final piece of legislation to become law during the 41st Parliament. That bill was no longer in force as of 21 December 2015 and the current Justin Trudeau government introduced legislation to repeal the law, which was repealed on 19 June 2017.

Hiebert chose not to run again in the 2015 General Election, telling the Peace Arch News that he "never intended to become a career politician" and returned to his private business pursuits in the Surrey, BC community where he lives.

== Political positions ==
Russ Hiebert was an opponent of the Liberal-proposed Carbon Tax of 2009, referring to it as "job-killing" and "irresponsible" during question period.

Hiebert spoke in opposition to Bill C-428, a proposal to reduce the residency requirement for entitlement to Old Age Security (OAS) from ten years to three years.

In September 2011, Hiebert spoke in Parliament in support of Bill C-10, the Safe Streets and Communities Act, stating that it "would increase sentences for child sex offenders, end the use of house arrest for serious and violent crimes and increase penalties for drug dealers who specifically target our children."

Hiebert voted in favour of Motion 312, Stephen Woodworth's private member bill which called for an all-party committee of MPs to discuss when human life and legal personhood begins.

In December 2011, Hiebert put forth a private members bill, C-377, An Act to Amend the Income Tax Act (labour organizations). The bill would require labour unions to publicly disclose their spending. In December 2012, Bill C-377 passed Third Reading in the House of Commons with a vote of 147 to 135 and was subsequently passed by the Senate and given royal assent.
