= Randy White (Canadian politician) =

Canadian accountant and politician

Member of Parliament for Langley—Abbotsford (Fraser Valley West; 1993–1997)
- In office October 16, 1993 – January 23, 2006
- Preceded by: Robert Wenman
- Succeeded by: Riding abolished

Member of Parliament for Abbotsford
- In office June 28, 2004 – January 23, 2006
- Preceded by: Riding established
- Succeeded by: Ed Fast

Personal details
- Born: September 3, 1948 (age 77) Halifax, Nova Scotia, Canada
- Party: Reform (1993-2000); Canadian Alliance (2000–2004); Conservative (2004–present)
- Other political affiliations: BC Conservatives (2010)

Randy White (born September 3, 1948 in Halifax, Nova Scotia) is a Canadian accountant and former politician. White was first elected to the House of Commons of Canada as the Reform Party Member of Parliament (MP) for Fraser Valley West, British Columbia in the 1993 federal election.

In the 1997 election, he was re-elected for the riding of Langley—Abbotsford, and became a Canadian Alliance MP in 2000 when Reform was joined by dissident members of the Progressive Conservative Party of Canada.

White served as the Reform Party's House Leader from 1997 to 2000 and as the Canadian Alliance House Leader from 2001 to 2002. He also served as Caucus Chair in 2001, and as Deputy Caucus Chair in 2002. He joined the new Conservative Party of Canada upon the merger of the Alliance with the Progressive Conservative Party in early 2004.

In 2004, Randy White famously was quoted saying "to heck with the courts" in regard to overturning same-sex marriage. Bruce Cheadle of the Canadian Press said that this comment "may have cost the Conservatives the election".

White left politics in 2006 and did not run in the 2006 federal election. He has continued activity in the area of drug policy, including founding The Drug Prevention Network of Canada.

In 2010, the British Columbia Conservative Party announced that White had joined the party and would chair its tactical advisory group.

White is a former member of the Royal Canadian Air Force.

== Electoral record ==
2004 Canadian federal election: Abbotsford
Party	Candidate	Votes	%	±%	Expenditures
Conservative	Randy White	29,587	61.37	–	$66,142.97
Liberal	Moe Gill	9,617	19.95	–	$41,240.27
New Democratic	Scott Fast	6,575	13.64	–	$6,979.90
Green	Karl Hann	1,389	2.88	–	$539.80
Christian Heritage	Harold J. Ludwig	585	1.21	–	$2,442.88
Marijuana	Tim Felger	404	0.84	–	$9,999.29
Marxist–Leninist	David MacKay	51	0.11	–	none listed
Total valid votes/expense limit		48,208	99.62	–	$75,518.93
Total rejected ballots		182	0.38	–	
Turnout		48,390	64.57	–	
Eligible voters		74,939			
Conservative notional hold		Swing		–	
Note: Change based on redistributed results. Conservative change based on combined total of the Canadian Alliance and the Progressive Conservative Party.
Source: Elections Canada
