= South Surrey—White Rock—Langley =

Former federal electoral district in British Columbia, Canada

Coordinates: 49.07°N 122.75°W

British Columbia electoral district

Defunct federal electoral district
- Legislature: House of Commons
- District created: 1996
- District abolished: 2003
- First contested: 1997
- Last contested: 2004

South Surrey—White Rock—Langley was a federal electoral district in British Columbia, Canada, that was represented in the House of Commons of Canada from 1997 to 2004.

== Geography ==
This electoral district included the City of White Rock and City of Langley, as well as the southern portions of the Township of Langley and the City of Surrey.

== History ==
This riding was created in 1996 from Fraser Valley West and Surrey—White Rock—South Langley ridings. In 2003, it was abolished and parts of it went to help form Langley and South Surrey—White Rock—Cloverdale ridings.

== Members of Parliament ==
This riding elected only one Member of Parliament:

- 1997-2004: Val Meredith - Reform (1997–2000), Canadian Alliance (2000–2003), Conservative (2003–2004) - She previously represented Surrey—White Rock—South Langley.

== Election results ==
2000 Canadian federal election
Party	Candidate	Votes	%	±%	Expenditures
Alliance	Val Meredith	28,762	59.95	+5.08	$61,569
Liberal	Bill Brooks	10,200	21.26	–8.88	$32,115
Progressive Conservative	Alistair Johnston	4,796	10.00	+5.48	$10,453
New Democratic	Matt Todd	2,718	5.66	–2.23	$3,375
Green	Steve Chitty	844	1.76	+0.11	none listed
Marijuana	Mavis Louise Becker	559	1.17	–	none listed
Natural Law	Daphne Quance	100	0.21	–0.07	none listed
Total valid votes		47,979	99.76		
Total rejected ballots		117	0.24	+0.02	
Turnout		48,096	67.82	–3.54	
Eligible voters		70,916			
Alliance hold		Swing		+6.98	
Source: Elections Canada

1997 Canadian federal election
Party	Candidate	Votes	%	±%	Expenditures
Reform	Val Meredith	25,141	54.87	–	$51,726
Liberal	Wilf Hurd	13,810	30.14	–	$52,648
New Democratic	Julie A. Grenier	3,616	7.89	–	$11,952
Progressive Conservative	Lorraine Mary Brazeau	2,068	4.51	–	$22,219
Green	Steve Chitty	756	1.65	–	$656
Christian Heritage	Marcia Cecile Husson	169	0.37	–	none listed
Canadian Action	Marie Fortier	130	0.28	–	$1,566
Natural Law	Kathy McClement	129	0.28	–	none listed
Total valid votes		45,819	99.77		
Total rejected ballots		104	0.23	–	
Turnout		45,923	71.36	–	
Eligible voters		64,351			
Source: Elections Canada

== See also ==
- List of Canadian electoral districts
- Historical federal electoral districts of Canada
