= Robert Wenman =

Canadian politician

Member of Parliament for Fraser Valley West
- In office July 8, 1974 – October 25, 1993
- Preceded by: Mark Rose
- Succeeded by: Randy White

Member of Legislative Assembly for Delta
- In office June 28, 1966 – August 30, 1972
- Preceded by: Ernest LeCours; Hunter Vogel
- Succeeded by: Carl Liden

Personal details
- Born: June 19, 1940 Maidstone, Saskatchewan, Canada
- Died: June 14, 1995 (aged 54)
- Party: Progressive Conservative
- Other political affiliations: Social Credit
- Education: University of Saskatchewan

Robert Lloyd Wenman (19 June 1940 – 14 June 1995) was a Progressive Conservative party member of the House of Commons of Canada. He was a businessman, investment counsellor, and teacher by career.

Wenman was born in Maidstone, Saskatchewan and attended the University of Saskatchewan and various schools in the United States. In 1966, he became a member of British Columbia's provincial legislature for the Social Credit party, setting a record as youngest MLA at that time. He was re-elected in the 1969 provincial election but then defeated in the 1972 provincial election.

He was first elected at the Fraser Valley West riding in the 1974 federal election. He was re-elected in that riding four times, in 1979, 1980, 1984 and 1988. He left federal politics after this and did not campaign in the 1993 federal election.

Wenman died at age 54.
