= South Surrey—White Rock—Cloverdale =

Former federal electoral district in British Columbia, Canada

Coordinates: 49.07°N 122.77°W

British Columbia electoral district
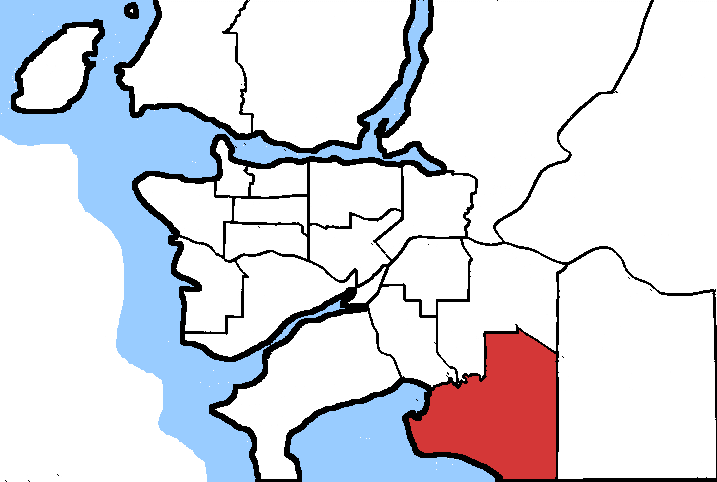
- South Surrey—White Rock—Cloverdale in relation to other federal electoral districts in Vancouver

Defunct federal electoral district
- Legislature: House of Commons
- District created: 2003
- District abolished: 2013
- First contested: 2004
- Last contested: 2011
- District webpage: profile, map

Demographics
- Population (2011): 127,729
- Electors (2011): 84,964
- Area (km²): 149.69
- Census division: Greater Vancouver
- Census subdivision(s): Surrey, White Rock

South Surrey—White Rock—Cloverdale was a federal electoral district in British Columbia, Canada, that was represented in the House of Commons of Canada from 2004 until the 2015 election.

== History ==
This electoral district was created in 2003 from parts of South Surrey—White Rock—Langley and Surrey Central ridings. This riding was dissolved into South Surrey—White Rock and Cloverdale—Langley City during the 2012 electoral redistribution.

== Member of Parliament ==
Parliament	Years	Member	Party
South Surrey—White Rock—Cloverdale; Riding created from South Surrey—White Rock—Langley and Surrey Central
38th	2004–2006	Russ Hiebert	Conservative
39th	2006–2008	Russ Hiebert	Conservative
40th	2008–2011	Russ Hiebert	Conservative
41st	2011–2015	Russ Hiebert	Conservative
Riding dissolved into South Surrey—White Rock and Cloverdale—Langley City

== Election results ==
2011 Canadian federal election
Party	Candidate	Votes	%	±%	Expenditures
Conservative	Russ Hiebert	31,990	54.55	–2.10	$82,586.14
New Democratic	Susan Keeping	11,881	20.26	+7.29	$19,814.22
Liberal	Hardy Staub	9,775	16.67	–4.23	$58,384.45
Green	Larry Colero	3,245	5.53	–3.45	$9,994.22
Independent	Aart Looye	753	1.28	–	$5,233.21
Christian Heritage	Mike Schouten	429	0.73	–	$25,726.58
Progressive Canadian	Brian Marlatt	228	0.39	–0.11	$387.20
Independent	David Hawkins	189	0.32	–	$187.76
Independent	Kevin Peter Donohoe	152	0.26	–	none listed
Total valid votes/expense limit		58,642	99.73	–	$94,502.05
Total rejected ballots		158	0.27	–0.08	
Turnout		58,800	64.27	–0.81	
Eligible voters		91,485			
Conservative hold		Swing		–4.70	
Source: Elections Canada

2008 Canadian federal election
Party	Candidate	Votes	%	±%	Expenditures
Conservative	Russ Hiebert	31,216	56.65	+9.97	$85,131.95
Liberal	Judy Higginbotham	11,515	20.90	–9.78	$74,875.29
New Democratic	Peter Prontzos	7,146	12.97	–3.88	$15,698.42
Green	David Blair	4,951	8.99	+3.71	$2,003.18
Progressive Canadian	Brian Marlatt	273	0.50	–0.02	$308.11
Total valid votes/expense limit		55,101	99.65	–	$88,339.85
Total rejected ballots		195	0.35	+0.18	
Turnout		55,296	65.08	–4.71	
Eligible voters		84,964			
Conservative hold		Swing		+9.87	
Source: Elections Canada

2006 Canadian federal election
Party	Candidate	Votes	%	±%	Expenditures
Conservative	Russ Hiebert	26,383	46.68	+4.01	$80,147.47
Liberal	Jim McMurtry	17,336	30.67	–6.09	$49,278.79
New Democratic	Libby Thornton	9,525	16.85	+2.49	$19,499.18
Green	Pierre Rovtar	2,980	5.27	–0.41	$3,355.42
Progressive Canadian	Brian Marlatt	293	0.52	–	$716.09
Total valid votes/expense limit		56,517	99.83	–	$80,540.60
Total rejected ballots		99	0.17	–0.07	
Turnout		56,616	69.79	+0.36	
Eligible voters		81,122			
Conservative hold		Swing		+5.05	
Source: Elections Canada

2004 Canadian federal election
Party	Candidate	Votes	%	±%	Expenditures
Conservative	Russ Hiebert	22,760	42.67	–26.46	$66,715.87
Liberal	Judy Higginbotham	19,611	36.77	+14.31	$66,683.58
New Democratic	H. Pummy Kaur	7,663	14.37	+8.93	$20,641.38
Green	Romeo De La Pena	3,032	5.68	–	$1,112.58
Canadian Action	Pat Taylor	272	0.51	–	none listed
Total valid votes/expense limit		53,338	99.75	–	$76,342.75
Total rejected ballots		132	0.25	–	
Turnout		53,470	69.43	–	
Eligible voters		77,012			
Conservative notional hold		Swing		–20.38	
Source: Elections Canada

2000 federal election redistributed results
Party	Vote	%
Canadian Alliance	27,788	58.73
Liberal	10,626	22.46
Progressive Conservative	4,920	10.40
New Democratic	2,571	5.43
Others	1,407	2.97

== See also ==
- List of Canadian electoral districts
- Historical federal electoral districts of Canada
