= Benno Friesen =

Canadian politician (1929–2021)

Benno Friesen (27 June 1929 – 29 September 2021) was a Canadian administrator, professor, and politician. Friesen served as a Progressive Conservative party member of the House of Commons of Canada.

Born in Nelson, British Columbia, Canada, Friesen represented the British Columbia riding of Surrey—White Rock where he was first elected in the 1974 federal election.

With the riding name changed to Surrey—White Rock—North Delta, Friesen won re-election in the 1979, 1980, and 1984 federal elections. He also won in the 1988 election when the riding name reverted to Surrey—White Rock. In all, he served in the 30th, 31st, 32nd, 33rd, and 34th Canadian Parliaments.

Friesen left federal politics in 1993 and was not a candidate for the federal election that year.
