= Langley—Abbotsford =

Former federal electoral district in British Columbia, Canada

British Columbia electoral district

Defunct federal electoral district
- Legislature: House of Commons
- District created: 1996
- District abolished: 2003
- First contested: 1997
- Last contested: 2000

Langley—Abbotsford (formerly known as Langley—Matsqui) was a federal electoral district in British Columbia, Canada, that was represented in the House of Commons of Canada from 1997 to 2004.

== Geography ==
It consisted of the western part of Central Fraser Valley Regional District and the northwestern part of Langley District Municipality.

== History ==
"Langley—Matsqui" riding was created in 1996 from parts of Fraser Valley East, Fraser Valley West and Surrey—White Rock—South Langley. The riding was renamed "Langley—Abbotsford" in 1997. It was only used in the 1997 and 2000 federal elections. The riding was abolished in 2003, divided between the ridings of Abbotsford and Langley.

== Member of Parliament ==
This riding elected only one Member of Parliament:

Parliament	Years	Member	Party
Riding created from Fraser Valley East, Fraser Valley West and Surrey—White Rock—South Langley
36th	1997–2000	Randy White	Reform
36th	2000–2000	Randy White	Alliance
37th	2000–2003	Randy White	Alliance
37th	2003–2004	Randy White	Conservative
Riding dissolved into Abbotsford and Langley

== Election results ==
2000 Canadian federal election
Party	Candidate	Votes	%	±%	Expenditures
Alliance	Randy White	38,810	70.11	+8.09	$56,408
Liberal	Steve Ferguson	9,554	17.26	–7.68	$14,677
Progressive Conservative	Bev Braaten	4,218	7.62	+4.09	$6,593
New Democratic	Paul Latham	2,353	4.25	–2.44	$1,300
No affiliation	Harold John Ludwig	420	0.76	–0.21	none listed
Total valid votes		55,355	99.67		
Total rejected ballots		186	0.33	+0.04	
Turnout		55,541	66.94	–0.33	
Eligible voters		82,972			
Alliance hold		Swing		+7.89	
Source: Elections Canada

1997 Canadian federal election
Party	Candidate	Votes	%	Expenditures
Reform	Randy White	31,664	62.02	$47,566
Liberal	Peter Warkentin	12,733	24.94	$62,704
New Democratic	Paul Latham	3,418	6.70	$6,322
Progressive Conservative	Donald Lyle Nundal	1,800	3.53	$4,778
Green	Doug Warkentin	790	1.55	$34
Christian Heritage	Harold John Ludwig	495	0.97	$1,502
Natural Law	Meri Papetti	151	0.30	$4
Total valid votes		51,051	99.71	
Total rejected ballots		151	0.29	
Turnout		51,202	67.27	
Eligible voters		76,113		
Reform notional hold		Swing		–
This riding was created from parts of Fraser Valley East, Fraser Valley West and Surrey—White Rock—South Langley, all of which elected a Reform candidate in the previous election. Randy White was the incumbent from Fraser Valley West.
Source: Elections Canada

== See also ==
- List of Canadian electoral districts
- Historical federal electoral districts of Canada
