= Fraser Valley West =

Former federal electoral district in British Columbia, Canada

British Columbia electoral district

Defunct federal electoral district
- Legislature: House of Commons
- District created: 1966
- District abolished: 1996
- First contested: 1968
- Last contested: 1993

Fraser Valley West was a federal electoral district in British Columbia, Canada, that was represented in the House of Commons of Canada from 1968 to 1997. This riding was created in 1966 from parts of Burnaby—Coquitlam, Fraser Valley, New Westminster and Coast—Capilano ridings.

It was abolished in 1996 when it was merged into Langley—Matsqui riding.

It consisted initially of the western part of Matsqui District Municipality and including Crescent Island in the Central Fraser Valley Regional District and part of Surrey District Municipality.

In 1987, it was redefined to consist of:

- the City of Langley;
- the northeastern part of Langley District Municipality, lying north and east of the City of Langley, the Fraser Highway and 240th Street; and
- the northwestern part of Matsqui District Municipality, lying north and west of Matsqui Power Railway right-of-way, and the south boundary of Matsqui District Municipality.

== Members of Parliament ==
This riding elected the following members of Parliament:

Parliament	Years	Member	Party
Riding created from Burnaby—Coquitlam, Fraser Valley; New Westminster and Coast—Capilano
28th	1968–1972	Mark Rose	New Democratic
29th	1972–1974	Mark Rose	New Democratic
30th	1974–1979	Robert Wenman	Progressive Conservative
31st	1979–1980	Robert Wenman	Progressive Conservative
32nd	1980–1984	Robert Wenman	Progressive Conservative
33rd	1984–1988	Robert Wenman	Progressive Conservative
34th	1988–1993	Robert Wenman	Progressive Conservative
35th	1993–1997	Randy White	Reform
Riding dissolved into Langley—Mastqui

== Election results ==
=== 1993 ===
1993 Canadian federal election
Party	Candidate	Votes	%	±%
Reform	Randy White	30,667	49.10	+45.59
Liberal	Peter Warkentin	18,447	29.53	+9.93
Progressive Conservative	Donald Lyle Nundal	7,135	11.42	–34.41
New Democratic	Lynn Fairall	3,237	5.18	–20.45
National	Robert J. Billyard	1,281	2.05	–
Christian Heritage	Edward John Van Woudenberg	1,036	1.66	–3.06
Natural Law	Terry Scarff	336	0.54	–
Libertarian	Lewis C. Dahlby	245	0.39	–0.30
Independent	Conan Nagle	79	0.13	–
Total valid votes		62,463	99.52	
Total rejected ballots		300	0.48	+0.20
Turnout		62,763	68.04	–10.44
Eligible voters		92,245		
Reform gain from Progressive Conservative		Swing		+17.78
Source: Elections Canada

=== 1988 ===
1988 Canadian federal election
Party	Candidate	Votes	%	±%
Progressive Conservative	Robert Wenman	23,565	45.84	–8.89
New Democratic	Lynn Fairall	13,178	25.63	–4.60
Liberal	Tony Wattie	10,079	19.60	+6.91
Christian Heritage	Edward John Van Woudenberg	2,428	4.72	–
Reform	John Russell Walsh	1,804	3.51	–
Libertarian	J. Wayne Marsden	358	0.70	+0.06
Total valid votes		51,412	99.73	
Total rejected ballots		141	0.27	–0.09
Turnout		51,553	78.48	+2.95
Eligible voters		65,687		
Progressive Conservative hold		Swing		–2.14
Source: Elections Canada

=== 1984 ===
1984 Canadian federal election
Party	Candidate	Votes	%	±%
Progressive Conservative	Robert Wenman	35,984	54.72	+4.10
New Democratic	Joe Leclair	19,878	30.23	–2.32
Liberal	Don McKinnon	8,349	12.70	–3.97
Rhinoceros	Earl Slick	474	0.72	–
Libertarian	Martin MacDonald	420	0.64	–
Green	Allan Hurd	277	0.42	–
Confederation of Regions	Lenard M. Smith	180	0.27	–
Communist	Viola M. Swann	103	0.16	–
Independent	Donald I. Knight	94	0.14	–
Total valid votes		65,759	99.63	
Total rejected ballots		242	0.37	+0.14
Turnout		66,001	75.53	+6.51
Eligible voters		87,385		
Progressive Conservative hold		Swing		+3.21
Source: Elections Canada

=== 1980 ===
1980 Canadian federal election
Party	Candidate	Votes	%	±%
Progressive Conservative	Robert Wenman	25,770	50.62	–3.59
New Democratic	Joe Leclair	16,568	32.55	+1.66
Liberal	Ben B.M. Nowak	8,483	16.66	+2.08
Marxist–Leninist	Sweg Deol	83	0.16	+0.04
Total valid votes		50,904	99.77	
Total rejected ballots		117	0.23	–0.01
Turnout		51,021	69.02	–4.01
Eligible voters		73,921		
Progressive Conservative hold		Swing		–2.63
Source: Elections Canada

=== 1979 ===
1979 Canadian federal election
Party	Candidate	Votes	%	±%
Progressive Conservative	Robert Wenman	26,892	54.21	+12.82
New Democratic	Cyril Barkved	15,322	30.89	–1.13
Liberal	Roland J. Bouwman	7,235	14.59	–9.16
Communist	Vi Swann	94	0.19	–0.18
Marxist–Leninist	Kirpal Bains	62	0.12	–
Total valid votes		49,605	99.76	
Total rejected ballots		120	0.24	–0.01
Turnout		49,725	73.03	+1.16
Eligible voters		68,092		
Progressive Conservative hold		Swing		+6.98
Source: Elections Canada

=== 1974 ===
1974 Canadian federal election
Party	Candidate	Votes	%	±%
Progressive Conservative	Robert Wenman	22,925	41.39	+10.18
New Democratic	Mark Rose	17,732	32.02	–15.47
Liberal	Ralph Gordon Baizley	13,152	23.75	+3.02
Social Credit	Edward Hibbs	1,205	2.18	–
Communist	Harold James Pritchett	204	0.37	–
Independent	Ronald William Jackson	167	0.30	–
Total valid votes		55,385	99.75	
Total rejected ballots		137	0.25	–0.85
Turnout		55,522	71.87	+0.28
Eligible voters		77,253		
Progressive Conservative gain from New Democratic		Swing		+12.83
Source: Library of Parliament

=== 1972 ===
1972 Canadian federal election
Party	Candidate	Votes	%	±%
New Democratic	Mark Rose	22,612	47.48	+7.87
Progressive Conservative	Trevor Armstrong	14,863	31.21	+17.47
Liberal	Oscar Austring	9,870	20.73	–17.06
Independent	Dave Charles Kane	275	0.58	–
Total valid votes		47,620	98.90	
Total rejected ballots		529	1.10	+0.51
Turnout		48,149	71.59	–4.95
Eligible voters		67,260		
New Democratic hold		Swing		–4.80
Source: Library of Parliament

=== 1968 ===
1968 Canadian federal election
Party	Candidate	Votes	%	±%
New Democratic	Mark Rose	14,410	39.61	–
Liberal	Edward Patrick Murphy	13,745	37.79	–
Progressive Conservative	Warren Lohnes	4,997	13.74	–
Social Credit	Bert Price	3,224	8.86	–
Total valid votes		36,376	99.41	
Total rejected ballots		217	0.59	–
Turnout		36,593	76.54	–
Eligible voters		47,812		
New Democratic notional hold		Swing		–
This riding was created from parts of Burnaby—Coquitlam, Fraser Valley and New Westminster, which elected two New Democrats and a Social Credit (Fraser Valley) in the previous election.
Source: Library of Parliament

== See also ==
- List of Canadian electoral districts
- Historical federal electoral districts of Canada
