= Randy Kamp =

Canadian politician (born 1953)

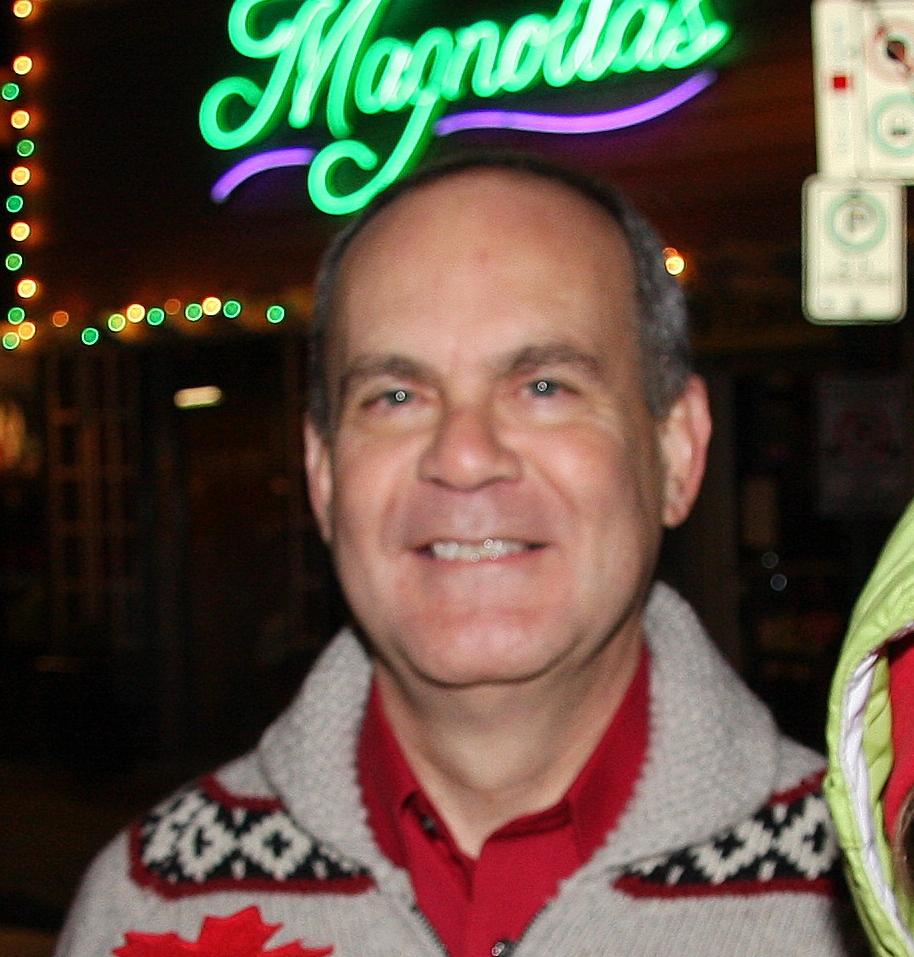

Member of the Canadian Parliament for Pitt Meadows—Maple Ridge—Mission
- In office January 23, 2006 – August 4, 2015
- Preceded by: Riding Established
- Succeeded by: Dan Ruimy

Member of the Canadian Parliament for Dewdney—Alouette
- In office June 28, 2004 – January 23, 2006
- Preceded by: Grant McNally

Personal details
- Born: August 30, 1953 (age 72) Salmon Arm, British Columbia, Canada
- Party: Conservative
- Spouse: Ruth Kamp
- Profession: Manager, Executive Assistant
- Portfolio: Parliamentary Secretary to the Minister of Fisheries and Oceans
- Website: http://www.randykamp.com

Randy Kamp (born August 30, 1953) is a Canadian politician based in British Columbia. He was a Conservative Member of Parliament from 2004 to 2015.

== Early life and education ==
Born in Salmon Arm, British Columbia, Kamp grew up in Maple Ridge, British Columbia and graduated from Maple Ridge Secondary School in 1971. He studied at Simon Fraser University in theology and earned a Bachelor of Arts. He then studied linguistics at the graduate level.

== Ministry ==
From 1985 to 1992, he and his family lived in the Philippines where he was regional director for an organization doing linguistic work among minority language groups. Kamp was Pastor of Maple Ridge Church Baptist Church, member of the Fellowship of Evangelical Baptist Churches in Canada, until 1997.

== Politics ==
In 1997, Kamp was hired as the executive assistant to Grant McNally, the Member of Parliament for the Dewdney—Alouette riding from 1997 to 2004.

When McNally retired, Kamp decided to run for Parliament, and was elected as the Member of Parliament for Dewdney—Alouette during the 2004 federal election. In his first term, Kamp was promoted to the position of Official Opposition Critic for Fisheries and Oceans on the Pacific Coast and was elected Chair of the Conservative Crystal Meth Task Force.

On January 23, 2006, Kamp was re-elected to the House of Commons as the member for Pitt Meadows—Maple Ridge—Mission as his riding was now called. Shortly thereafter, Prime Minister Stephen Harper appointed Kamp as the Parliamentary Secretary to the Minister of Fisheries and Oceans, Loyola Hearn. He was concurrently a member of the Standing Committee on Fisheries and Oceans.

Kamp voted in favour of motion 312, Stephen Woodworth's private member's bill that would have had Canada reexamine at what time human life begins.

Kamp has been married to his wife Ruth for over thirty years, and they have three adult children and four grandchildren.

On January 31, 2015, Kamp announced that he would retire and not stand as a candidate in the next election, widely expected to occur in October 2015.

== Election history ==
2011 Canadian federal election
Party	Candidate	Votes	%	±	Expenditures
Conservative	Randy Kamp	28,803	54.34%	+2.53	
New Democratic	Craig Speirs	18,835	35.53%	+2.52	
Liberal	Mandeep Bhuller	2,739	5.17%	-1.46	
Green	Peter Tam	2,739	5.17%	-1.46	
Total valid votes		53,006	100.00%		
Total rejected ballots		158	0.3%		
Turnout		56,164	60.04%		

2008 Canadian federal election
Party	Candidate	Votes	%	±	Expenditures
Conservative	Randy Kamp	26,512	51.8%		
New Democratic	Mike Bocking	16,894	33.0%		
Liberal	Dan Olson	3,394	6.6%		
Green	Mike Gildersleeve	3,833	7.5%		
Total valid votes		51171	99.7%		
Total rejected ballots		137	0.3%		
Turnout		51308	60.2%		

2006 Canadian federal election
Party	Candidate	Votes	%	±	Expenditures
Conservative	Randy Kamp	20,946	40.18%		$76,400.47
New Democratic	Mike Bocking	18,225	34.96%		$62,086.56
Liberal	Keith Henry	10,556	20.25%		$42,446.84
Green	Robert Hornsey	1,694	3.25%	–	
Marijuana	Dan Banov	327	0.62%		
Independent	Erin Knipstrom	277	0.53%		
Marxist–Leninist	Frank Martin	95	0.18%		
Total valid votes		52,120	100.00%		
Total rejected ballots		128			
Turnout		52,248	64.1%		

2004 Canadian federal election
Party	Candidate	Votes	%	±	Expenditures
Conservative	Randy Kamp	18,490	38.50%		$51,279
New Democratic	Mike Bocking	15,693	32.68%		$34,357
Liberal	Blanche Juneau	10,500	21.86%		$14,179
Green	Tammy Lea Meyer	2,535	5.27%	–	$1,789
No affiliation	Scott Etches	1,156	1.66%		$707
Total valid votes		48,016	100.00%		
Total rejected ballots		125	0.26%		
Turnout		48,141	62.29%		
