= Brad Vis =

Canadian politician

Brad Vis MP

Member of Parliament for Mission—Matsqui—Abbotsford Mission—Matsqui—Fraser Canyon (2019-2025)
- Incumbent
- Assumed office October 21, 2019
- Preceded by: Jati Sidhu

Personal details
- Born: 1983 or 1984 (age 42–43) Matsqui, British Columbia, Canada
- Party: Conservative [Shadow Minister for Small Business]

Brad Vis MP (born in 1984) is a Canadian politician who was elected to represent the riding of Mission—Matsqui—Fraser Canyon in the House of Commons of Canada in the 2019 Canadian federal election, and re-elected in 2021. He is the member of the Conservative Party of Canada.

Vis worked in government, politics and the agri-business sector before being elected to Parliament. He holds a bachelor's degree in political science from the University of British Columbia and a master's degree in political science from Carleton University.

At the time of the 2025 Canadian federal election, he lived in Abbotsford, British Columbia.

== Electoral record ==
2025 Canadian federal election: Mission—Matsqui—Abbotsford
Party	Candidate	Votes	%	±%	Expenditures
Conservative	Brad Vis	33,791	56.70	+9.58	$111,101.54
Liberal	Jeff Howe	21,838	36.64	+12.42	$38,999.20
New Democratic	Jules Côté	2,745	4.61	–13.38	$5,340.20
Green	John Kidder	723	1.21	–2.50	none listed
People's	Kevin Sinclair	502	0.84	–6.13	$5,200.00
Total valid votes/expense limit		59,599	99.42	–	$130,464.32
Total rejected ballots		346	0.58	–0.12	
Turnout		59,945	70.25	+9.08	
Eligible voters		85,337			
Conservative hold		Swing		–1.42	
Source: Elections Canada

2021 Canadian federal election: Mission—Matsqui—Fraser Canyon
Party	Candidate	Votes	%	±%	Expenditures
Conservative	Brad Vis	18,908	43.79	+1.39	$105,614.90
Liberal	Geet Grewal	10,598	24.55	–2.15	$93,378.54
New Democratic	Lynn Perrin	8,709	20.17	+2.61	$11,489.62
People's	Tyler Niles	3,073	7.12	+4.83	$9,144.65
Green	Nicole Bellay	1,887	4.37	–6.52	$11,177.38
Total valid votes/expense limit		43,175	99.31	–	$116,997.79
Total rejected ballots		302	0.69	–0.25	
Turnout		43,477	61.17	–5.30	
Eligible voters		71,078			
Conservative hold		Swing		+1.77	
Source: Elections Canada

2019 Canadian federal election: Mission—Matsqui—Fraser Canyon
Party	Candidate	Votes	%	±%	Expenditures
Conservative	Brad Vis	19,535	42.41	+7.50	$77,546.99
Liberal	Jati Sidhu	12,299	26.70	–10.53	$110,453.00
New Democratic	Michael Nenn	8,089	17.56	–2.99	$2,936.51
Green	John Kidder	5,019	10.90	+5.76	$22,090.21
People's	Julius Nick Csaszar	1,055	2.29	–	$5,447.11
Marxist–Leninist	Elaine Wismer	69	0.15	+0.02	none listed
Total valid votes/expense limit		46,066	99.06	–	$112,972.00
Total rejected ballots		439	0.94	+0.48	
Turnout		46,505	66.46	–3.91	
Eligible voters		69,970			
Conservative gain from Liberal		Swing		+9.02	
Source: Elections Canada

2015 Canadian federal election: Mission—Matsqui—Fraser Canyon
Party	Candidate	Votes	%	±%	Expenditures
Liberal	Jati Sidhu	16,625	37.23	+28.84	$101,945.63
Conservative	Brad Vis	15,587	34.91	–19.58	$97,837.00
New Democratic	Dennis Adamson	9,174	20.55	–11.48	$7,404.09
Green	Arthur Alexander Green	2,293	5.14	+0.50	$13,329.06
Independent	Wyatt Scott	914	2.05	–	none listed
Marxist–Leninist	Elaine Wismer	58	0.13	–	none listed
Total valid votes/expense limit		44,651	99.53	–	$217,198.40
Total rejected ballots		209	0.47	–	
Turnout		44,860	70.38	–	
Eligible voters		63,744			
Liberal notional gain from Conservative		Swing		+24.21	
Source: Elections Canada
