= Grant McNally =

Canadian politician

Member of Parliament for Dewdney-Alouette
- In office June 2, 1997 – June 27, 2004
- Preceded by: Electoral district established
- Succeeded by: Randy Kamp (Pitt Meadows—Maple Ridge—Mission)

Personal details
- Born: January 8, 1962 (age 64) Vancouver, British Columbia
- Party: Conservative (2003–present)
- Other political affiliations: Alliance (2000–2003); Reform (1997–2000)
- Education: Trinity Western University

Grant McNally (born January 8, 1962) was a member of the House of Commons of Canada from 1997 to 2004. He was educated at Trinity Western University in Langley and worked as a teacher prior to his election.

He won election with the Reform Party in the Dewdney-Alouette electoral district in the 1997 general election. He won re-election in 2000 while the Canadian Alliance transitioned to the Canadian Alliance and then the Conservative Party.

In early 2001, he temporarily joined the Democratic Representative Caucus group in protest of Stockwell Day's Alliance Party leadership.

McNally served in the 36th, and 37th Canadian Parliaments. He did not seek a third term in Parliament for the 2004 federal election.

== Electoral history ==
2000 Canadian federal election: Dewdney—Alouette
Party	Candidate	Votes	%	±%	Expenditures
Alliance	Grant McNally	28,181	58.42	+11.17	$32,313
Liberal	Jati Sidhu	8,717	18.07	–7.03	$37,270
Progressive Conservative	Gord Kehler	5,804	12.03	+5.98	$8,033
New Democratic	Malcolm James Crockett	5,535	11.47	–7.70	$15,196
Total valid votes		48,237	99.57		
Total rejected ballots		210	0.43	+0.13	
Turnout		48,447	63.38	+0.37	
Eligible voters		76,439			
Alliance hold		Swing		+9.10	
Change for the Canadian Alliance is based on the Reform Party.
Source: Elections Canada

1997 Canadian federal election: Dewdney—Alouette
Party	Candidate	Votes	%	Expenditures
Reform	Grant McNally	20,446	47.26	$28,213
Liberal	Lorne Riding	10,861	25.10	$32,253
New Democratic	Malcolm James Crockett	8,296	19.17	$31,458
Progressive Conservative	Jon Harris	2,619	6.05	$14,410
Green	Elizabeth Nolan	634	1.47	none listed
Christian Heritage	Harry Hannis	215	0.50	$440
Natural Law	William Alexander Cameron	195	0.45	$440
Total valid votes		43,266	99.70	
Total rejected ballots		132	0.30	–
Turnout		43,398	63.01	–
Eligible voters		68,878		
Reform notional hold		Swing		–
This riding was created from parts of Fraser Valley East and Mission—Coquitlam, both of which elected a Reform candidate in the previous election.
Source: Elections Canada
