= Pitt Meadows—Maple Ridge—Mission =

Former federal electoral district in British Columbia, Canada

Coordinates: 49.232°N 122.714°W

British Columbia electoral district
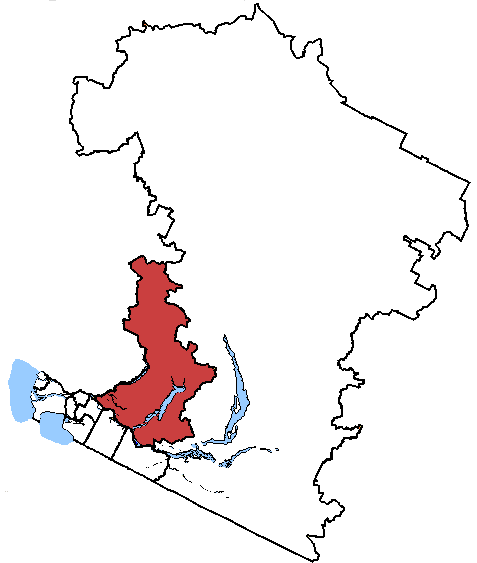
- Pitt Meadows—Maple Ridge—Mission in relation to other Fraser Valley federal electoral districts

Defunct federal electoral district
- Legislature: House of Commons
- District created: 1996
- District abolished: 2013
- First contested: 1997
- Last contested: 2011
- District webpage: profile, map

Demographics
- Population (2011): 131,746
- Electors (2011): 85,174
- Area (km²): 2,601.09
- Census subdivision(s): Maple Ridge, Mission, Pitt Meadows

Pitt Meadows—Maple Ridge—Mission (formerly Dewdney—Alouette) was a federal electoral district in British Columbia, Canada, that was represented in the House of Commons of Canada from 1997 to 2015.

== Demographics ==
Population, 2001	110,577
Electors	77,280
Area (km^{2})	
Population density (people per km^{2})	

== Geography ==
The district includes the northwestern quarter of the Fraser Valley Regional District (which includes Mission, Kent, Nicomen Island, and Lake Erock), and the District Municipalities of Maple Ridge and Pitt Meadows and their vicinities.

== History ==
The electoral district was created in 1996 as "Dewdney—Alouette" riding from parts of Fraser Valley East and Mission—Coquitlam ridings. Its name was changed in 2004 to "Pitt Meadows—Maple Ridge—Mission" in 2004.

The 2012 electoral redistribution saw this riding split into Pitt Meadows—Maple Ridge and Mission—Matsqui—Fraser Canyon for the 2015 election, the former Conservative MP Randy Kemp retired, with the Liberal Party picking up both new ridings.

== Members of Parliament ==
Parliament	Years	Member	Party
Dewdney—Alouette; Riding created from Fraser Valley East and Mission—Coquitlam
36th	1997–2000	Grant McNally	Reform
36th	2000–2000	Grant McNally	Alliance
37th	2000–2003	Grant McNally	Alliance
37th	2003–2004	Grant McNally	Conservative
Pitt Meadows—Maple Ridge—Mission
38th	2004–2006	Randy Kamp	Conservative
39th	2006–2008	Randy Kamp	Conservative
40th	2008–2011	Randy Kamp	Conservative
41st	2011–2015	Randy Kamp	Conservative
Riding to be dissolved into Pitt Meadows—Maple Ridge and Mission—Matsqui—Fraser Canyon

== Election results ==
=== Pitt Meadows–Maple Ridge–Mission ===
2011 Canadian federal election
Party	Candidate	Votes	%	±%	Expenditures
Conservative	Randy Kamp	28,803	54.34	+2.53	$84,060.47
New Democratic	Craig Speirs	18,835	35.53	+2.52	$62,291.24
Liberal	Mandeep Bhuller	2,739	5.17	–1.47	$12,390.25
Green	Peter Tam	2,629	4.96	–2.53	$3,650.80
Total valid votes/expense limit		53,006	99.70	–	$93,506.18
Total rejected ballots		158	0.30	+0.03	
Turnout		53,164	59.33	–0.91	
Eligible voters		89,613			
Conservative hold		Swing		+0.01	
Source: Elections Canada

2008 Canadian federal election
Party	Candidate	Votes	%	±%	Expenditures
Conservative	Randy Kamp	26,512	51.81	+11.62	$83,000.16
New Democratic	Mike Bocking	16,894	33.01	–1.95	$55,478.10
Green	Mike Gildersleeve	3,833	7.49	+4.24	$493.22
Liberal	Dan Olson	3,394	6.63	–13.62	$5,165.74
Libertarian	Jeff Monds	300	0.59	–	none listed
Independent	Evans Nicholson	137	0.27	–	$1,933.49
Independent	Chum Richardson	101	0.20	–	none listed
Total valid votes/expense limit		51,171	99.73	–	$88,208.95
Total rejected ballots		137	0.27	+0.02	
Turnout		51,308	60.24	–3.90	
Eligible voters		85,174			
Conservative hold		Swing		+6.79	
Source: Elections Canada

2006 Canadian federal election
Party	Candidate	Votes	%	±%	Expenditures
Conservative	Randy Kamp	20,946	40.19	+1.68	$76,042.41
New Democratic	Mike Bocking	18,225	34.97	+2.28	$59,613.84
Liberal	Keith Henry	10,556	20.25	–1.61	$40,612.43
Green	Robert Hornsey	1,694	3.25	–2.02	$200.00
Marijuana	Dan Banov	327	0.63	–	$789.00
Independent	Erin Knipstrom	277	0.53	–	none listed
Marxist–Leninist	Frank Martin	95	0.18	–	none listed
Total valid votes/expense limit		52,120	99.76	–	$80,714.16
Total rejected ballots		128	0.25	–0.02	
Turnout		52,248	64.14	–	
Eligible voters		81,461			
Conservative hold		Swing		–0.30	
Source: Elections Canada

=== Dewdney—Alouette ===
2004 Canadian federal election: Dewdney—Alouette
Party	Candidate	Votes	%	±%	Expenditures
Conservative	Randy Kamp	18,490	38.51	–31.95	$49,846.61
New Democratic	Mike Bocking	15,693	32.68	+21.21	$32,876.53
Liberal	Blanche Juneau	10,500	21.87	+3.80	$27,173.20
Green	Tammy Lea Meyer	2,535	5.28	–	$1,789.06
Independent	Scott Etches	798	1.66	–	$653.41
Total valid votes/expense limit		48,016	99.74	–	$76,632.59
Total rejected ballots		125	0.26	–0.17	
Turnout		48,141	62.29	–1.09	
Eligible voters		77,280			
Conservative hold		Swing		–26.58	
Change for the Conservatives is based on the totals for the Canadian Alliance and the Progressive Conservatives.
Source: Elections Canada

2000 Canadian federal election: Dewdney—Alouette
Party	Candidate	Votes	%	±%	Expenditures
Alliance	Grant McNally	28,181	58.42	+11.17	$32,313
Liberal	Jati Sidhu	8,717	18.07	–7.03	$37,270
Progressive Conservative	Gord Kehler	5,804	12.03	+5.98	$8,033
New Democratic	Malcolm James Crockett	5,535	11.47	–7.70	$15,196
Total valid votes		48,237	99.57		
Total rejected ballots		210	0.43	+0.13	
Turnout		48,447	63.38	+0.37	
Eligible voters		76,439			
Alliance hold		Swing		+9.10	
Change for the Canadian Alliance is based on the Reform Party.
Source: Elections Canada

1997 Canadian federal election: Dewdney—Alouette
Party	Candidate	Votes	%	Expenditures
Reform	Grant McNally	20,446	47.26	$28,213
Liberal	Lorne Riding	10,861	25.10	$32,253
New Democratic	Malcolm James Crockett	8,296	19.17	$31,458
Progressive Conservative	Jon Harris	2,619	6.05	$14,410
Green	Elizabeth Nolan	634	1.47	none listed
Christian Heritage	Harry Hannis	215	0.50	$440
Natural Law	William Alexander Cameron	195	0.45	$440
Total valid votes		43,266	99.70	
Total rejected ballots		132	0.30	–
Turnout		43,398	63.01	–
Eligible voters		68,878		
Reform notional hold		Swing		–
This riding was created from parts of Fraser Valley East and Mission—Coquitlam, both of which elected a Reform candidate in the previous election.
Source: Elections Canada

== See also ==
- List of Canadian electoral districts
- Historical federal electoral districts of Canada
