= 2006 Canadian federal election =

- January 23, 2006

308 seats in the House of Commons 155 seats needed for a majority
- Opinion polls
- Registered: 23,054,615
- Turnout: 64.7% (▲3.8 pp)
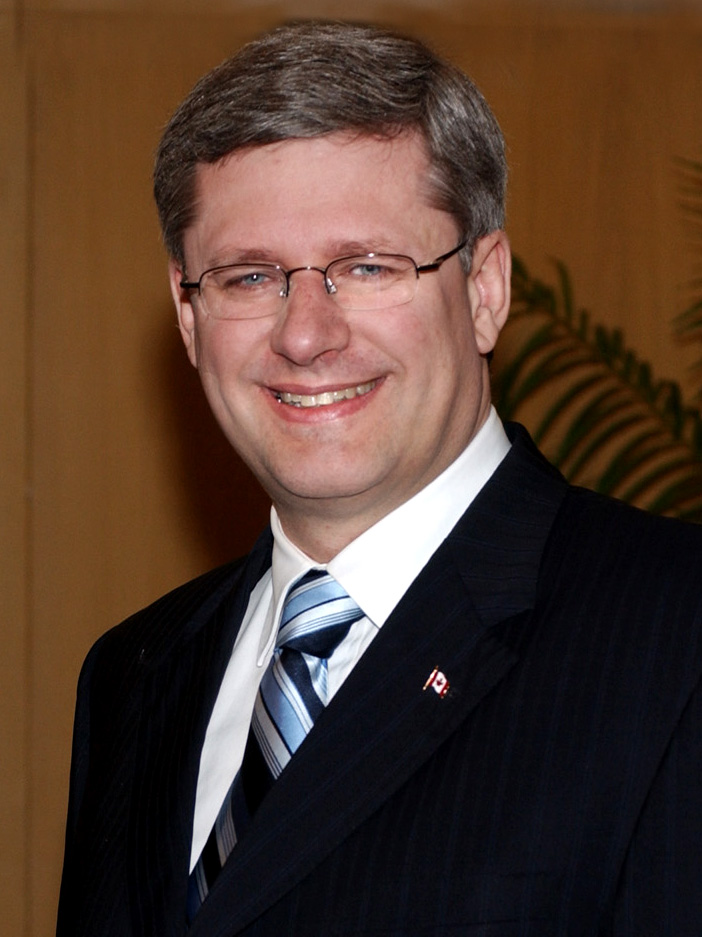

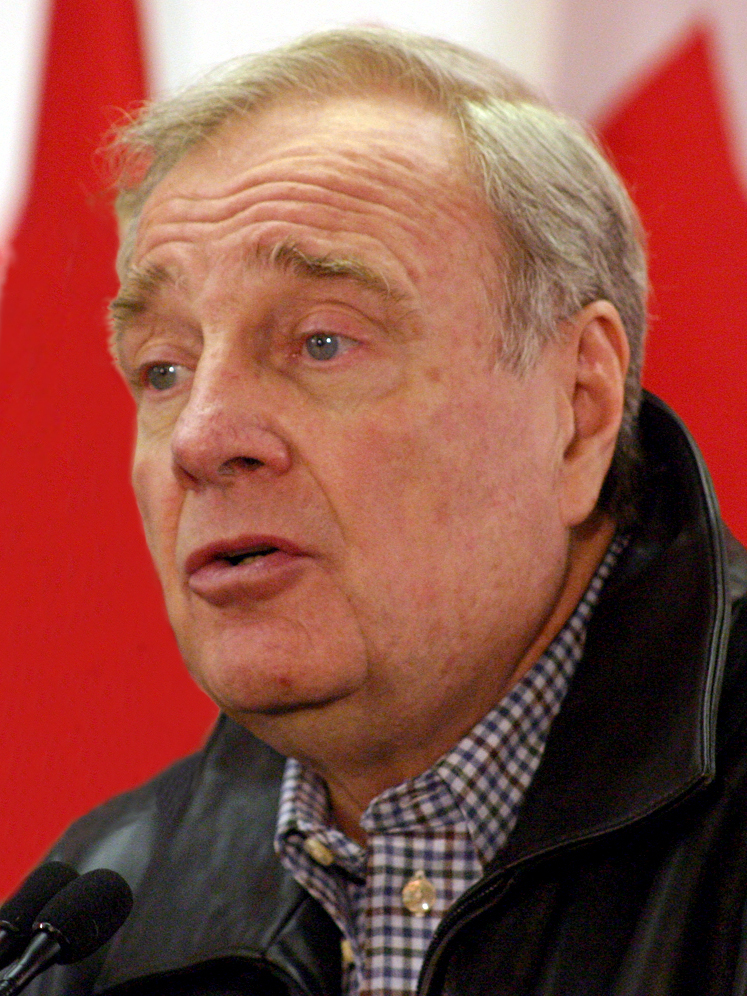

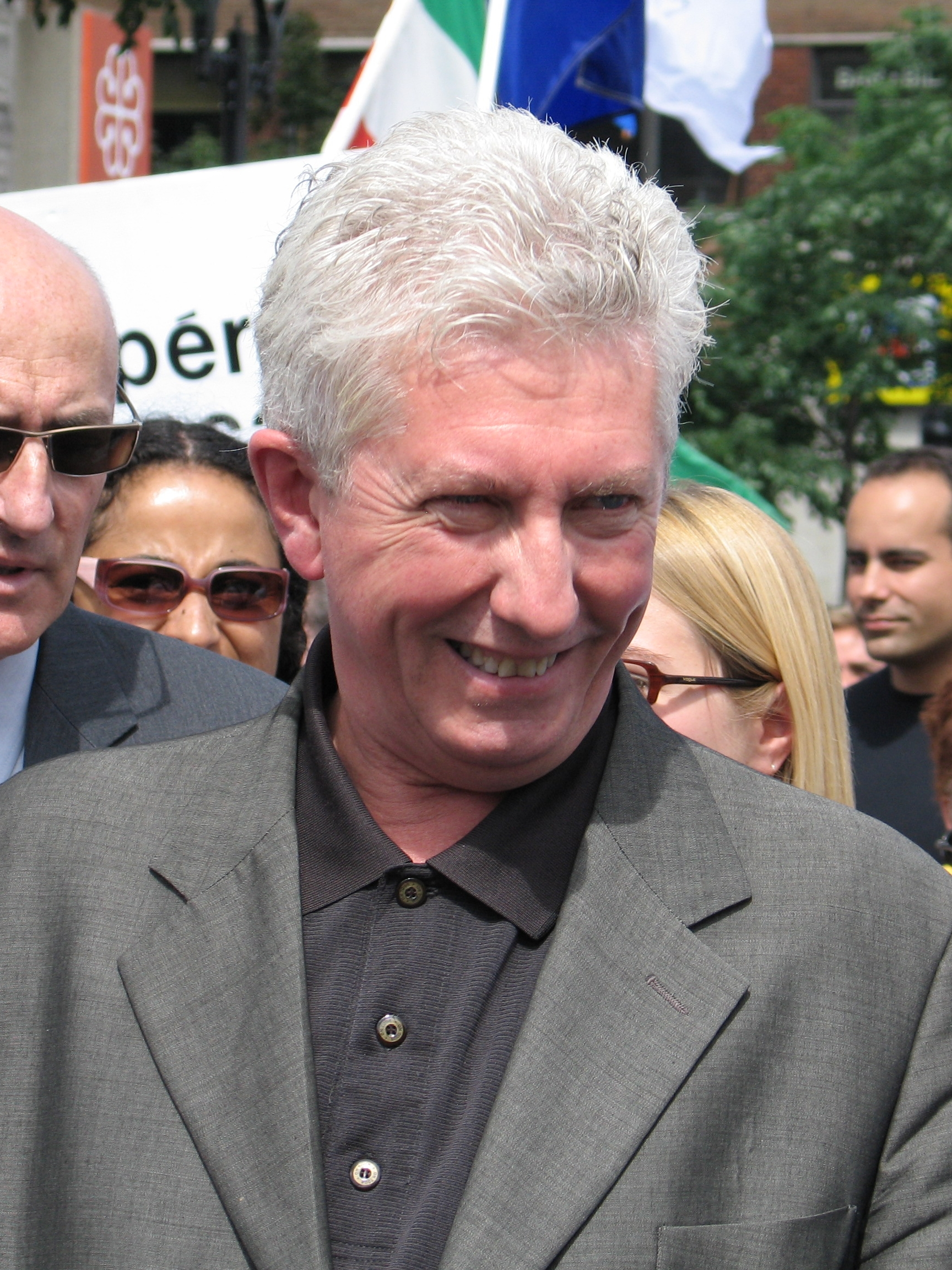

	First party	Second party
Leader	Stephen Harper	Paul Martin
Party	Conservative	Liberal
Leader since	March 20, 2004	November 14, 2003
Leader's seat	Calgary Southwest	LaSalle—Émard
Last election	99 seats, 29.63%	135 seats, 36.73%
Seats before	98	133
Seats won	124	103
Seat change	▲26	▼30
Popular vote	5,374,071	4,479,415
Percentage	36.27%	30.23%
Swing	▲6.64 pp	▼6.50 pp
	Third party	Fourth party
Leader	Gilles Duceppe	Jack Layton
Party	Bloc Québécois	New Democratic
Leader since	March 15, 1997	January 24, 2003
Leader's seat	Laurier— Sainte-Marie	Toronto—Danforth
Last election	54 seats, 12.39%	19 seats, 15.68%
Seats before	53	18
Seats won	51	29
Seat change	▼2	▲11
Popular vote	1,553,201	2,589,597
Percentage	10.48% (Note: Only contested seats in Quebec.)	17.48%
Swing	▼1.91 pp	▲1.80 pp

- The Canadian parliament after the 2006 election
Prime Minister before election
Paul Martin
Liberal
Prime Minister after election
Stephen Harper
Conservative

The 2006 Canadian federal election was held on January 23, 2006, to elect members to the House of Commons of Canada of the 39th Parliament of Canada.

New details of the sponsorship scandal were released through the Gomery Commission, and the three opposition parties aimed to bring down Liberal Prime Minister Paul Martin's minority government, contending that it was corrupt. On November 28, 2005, Martin's government was defeated on a motion of non-confidence. A day later, Martin met with Governor General Michaëlle Jean to dissolve parliament, triggering an unusual winter election.

The Conservative Party, that was formed in 2003 from the merger of the Progressive Conservative Party and the Canadian Alliance, scored its first-ever victory as they won the greatest number of seats in the House of Commons, winning 124 out of 308, up from 99 seats in 2004. Due to the emerging details of the sponsorship scandal, as well as a unified right-of-centre party, the Tories led by Stephen Harper won a federal minority and went on to end over 12 years of Liberal rule. Harper formed the smallest minority government in Canadian history (in terms of proportion of seats), becoming prime minister. The New Democratic Party experienced a modest boost in support whereas the Bloc Québécois' seat count nearly stayed the same. This is the most recent election in which the winning federal party did not win New Brunswick and Ontario. This is also the most recent election to have been a direct rematch of the previous one, as none of the four major parties saw a change in leadership between the 2004 and 2006 elections.

== Cause of the election ==
This unusual winter general election was caused by a motion of no confidence passed by the House of Commons on November 28, 2005, with Canada's three opposition parties contending that the Liberal government of Prime Minister Paul Martin was corrupt. The following morning Martin met with Governor General Michaëlle Jean, who then dissolved parliament, summoned the next parliament, and ordered the issuance of writs of election. The last set January 23, 2006, as election day and February 13 as the date for return of the writs. The campaign was almost eight weeks in length, the longest in two decades, in order to allow time for the Christmas and New Year holidays.

Recent political events, most notably testimony to the Gomery Commission investigating the sponsorship scandal, significantly weakened the Liberals (who, under Martin, had formed the first Liberal minority government since the Trudeau era) by allegations of criminal corruption in the party. The first Gomery report, released November 1, 2005, had found a "culture of entitlement" to exist within the Government. Although the next election was not legally required until 2009, the opposition had enough votes to force the dissolution of Parliament earlier. While Prime Minister Martin had committed in April 2005 to dissolve Parliament within a month of the tabling of the second Gomery Report (which was released on schedule on February 1, 2006), all three opposition parties—the Conservatives, Bloc Québécois, and New Democratic Party (NDP)—and three of the four independents decided that the issue at hand was how to correct the Liberal corruption, and the motion of non-confidence passed 171–133.

== Parties ==
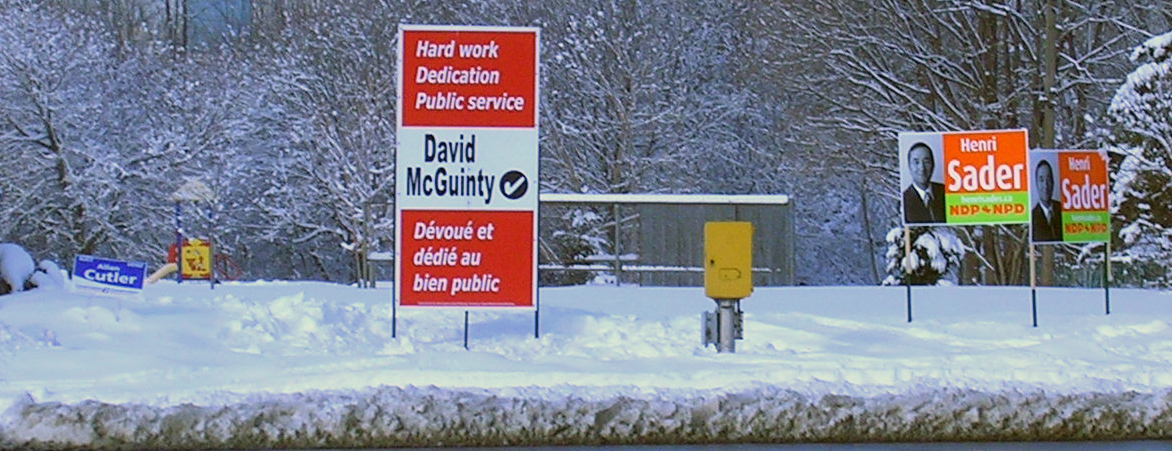
Election signs for the Conservatives, Liberals and NDP in the snow in Ottawa South, characterizing Canada's mid-winter election

Most observers believed only the Liberals and the Conservatives were capable of forming a government in this election, although Canadian political history is not without examples of wholly unexpected outcomes, such as Ontario's provincial election in 1990. However, with the exception of the Unionist government of 1917 (which combined members of both the Conservatives and the Liberals), at the Federal stage, only Liberals or Conservatives have formed government. With the end of the campaign at hand, pollsters and pundits placed the Conservatives ahead of the Liberals.

Prime Minister Paul Martin's Liberals hoped to recapture their majority, and this appeared likely at one point during the campaign; but it would have required holding back Bloc pressure in Quebec plus picking up some new seats there while also gaining seats in English Canada, most likely in rural Ontario and southwestern British Columbia. Towards the end of the campaign, even high-profile Liberals were beginning to concede defeat, and the best the Liberals could have achieved was a razor-thin minority.

Stephen Harper's Conservatives succeeded in bringing their new party into power in Canada. While continuing weaknesses in Quebec and urban areas rightfully prompted most observers to consider a Conservative majority government to be mathematically difficult to achieve, early on, Harper's stated goal was to achieve one nonetheless. Though the Conservatives were ahead of the Liberals in Quebec, they remained far behind the Bloc Québécois, and additional gains in rural and suburban Ontario would have been necessary to meet Stephen Harper's goal. The polls had remained pretty well static over the course of December, with the real shift coming in the first few days of the New Year. That is when the Conservatives took the lead and kept it for the rest of the campaign.

Harper started off the first month of the campaign with a policy-per-day strategy, which included a GST reduction and a child-care allowance. The Liberals opted to hold any major announcements until after the Christmas holidays; as a result, Harper dominated media coverage for the first weeks of the campaign and was able to define his platform and insulate it from expected Liberal attacks. On December 27, 2005, the Royal Canadian Mounted Police announced it was investigating allegations that Liberal Finance Minister Ralph Goodale's office had engaged in insider trading before making an important announcement on the taxation of income trusts. The RCMP indicated that they had no evidence of wrongdoing or criminal activity from any party associated with the investigation, including Goodale. However, the story dominated news coverage for the following week and prevented the Liberals from making their key policy announcements, allowing the Conservatives to refocus their previous attacks about corruption within the Liberal party. The Conservatives soon found themselves leading in the polls. By early January, they made a major breakthrough in Quebec, pushing the Liberals to second place.

As their lead solidified, media coverage of the Conservatives was much more positive, while Liberals found themselves increasingly criticized for running a poor campaign and making numerous gaffes.

The NDP has claimed that last minute tactical voting cost them several seats last time, as left-of-centre voters moved to the Liberals so that they could prevent a Harper-led government. Jack Layton avoided stating his party's goal was to win the election outright, instead calling for enough New Democrats to be elected to hold the balance of power in a Liberal or Conservative minority government. Political commentators have long argued that the NDP's main medium-term goal is to serve as junior partners to the Liberals in Canada's first-ever true coalition government. NDP leader Jack Layton was concerned last time over people voting Liberal so that they could avoid a Conservative government. Over the course of the last week of the campaign, Jack Layton called on Liberal voters disgusted with the corruption to "lend" their votes to the NDP to elect more NDP members to the House and hold the Conservatives to a minority.

The Bloc Québécois had a very successful result in the 2004 election, with the Liberals reduced to the core areas of federalist support in portions of Montreal and the Outaouais. Oddly enough, this meant that there were comparatively few winnable Bloc seats left—perhaps eight or so—for the party to target. With provincial allies the Parti Québécois widely tipped to regain power in 2007, a large sovereigntist contingent in the House could play a major role in reopening the matter of Quebec independence. The Bloc Québécois only runs candidates in the province of Quebec. However, Gilles Duceppe's dream of winning 50%+ of the popular vote was dashed when the polls broke after the New Year, and the Conservatives became a real threat to that vision in Quebec.

In addition to the four sitting parties, the Green Party of Canada ran candidates in all 308 federal ridings for the second consecutive election. Though the Greens had been an official party since the 1984 election, this campaign was the first in which they had stable financial support with which to campaign. After a breakthrough in the 2004 election, they exceeded the minimum 2% of the popular vote to receive federal funding. Supporters and sympathisers criticize that the party were not invited to the nationally televised debates even with its official status. The party has occasionally polled as high as 19% in British Columbia and 11% nationwide. Critics of the Green Party contended that, by drawing away left-of-centre votes, the Green Party actually assisted the Conservative Party in some ridings. The Greens denied this.

Other parties are listed in the table of results above.

== Events during the 38th Parliament ==
An early election seemed likely because the 2004 federal election, held on June 28, 2004, resulted in the election of a Liberal minority government. In the past, minority governments have had an average lifespan of a year and a half. Some people considered the 38th parliament to be particularly unstable. It involved four parties, and only very implausible ideological combinations (e.g., Liberals + Conservatives; Liberals + BQ; Conservatives + BQ + NDP) could actually command a majority of the seats, a necessity if a government is to retain power. From its earliest moments, there was some threat of the government falling as even the Speech from the Throne almost resulted in a non-confidence vote.

=== Brinkmanship in the spring of 2005 ===
The Liberal government came close to falling when testimony from the Gomery Commission caused public opinion to move sharply against the government. The Bloc Québécois were eager from the beginning to have an early election. The Conservatives announced they had also lost confidence in the government's moral authority. Thus, during much of spring 2005, there was a widespread belief that the Liberals would lose a confidence vote, prompting an election taking place in the spring or summer of 2005.

In a televised speech on April 21, Martin promised to request a dissolution of Parliament and begin an election campaign within 30 days of the Gomery Commission's final report. The release date of that report would later solidify as February 1, 2006; Martin then clarified that he intended to schedule the election call so as to have the polling day in April 2006.

Later that week, the NDP, who had initially opposed the budget, opted to endorse Martin's proposal for a later election. The Liberals agreed to take corporate tax cuts out of the budget on April 26 in exchange for NDP support on votes of confidence, but even with NDP support the Liberals still fell three votes short of a majority. However, a surprise defection of former Conservative leadership candidate Belinda Stronach to the Liberal party on May 17 changed the balance of power in the House. Independents Chuck Cadman and Carolyn Parrish provided the last two votes needed for the Liberals to win the budget vote.

The deal turned out to be rather unnecessary, as the Conservatives opted to ensure the government's survival on the motion of confidence surrounding the original budget, expressing support to the tax cuts and defence spending therein. When Parliament voted on second reading and referral of the budget and the amendment on May 19, the previous events kept the government alive. The original budget bill, C-43, passed easily, as expected, but the amendment bill, C-48, resulted in an equality of votes, and the Speaker of the House broke the tie to continue the parliament. The government never got as close to falling after that date. Third reading of Bill C-48 was held late at night on an unexpected day, and several Conservatives being absent, the motion passed easily, guaranteeing there would be no election in the near future.

=== Aftermath of the first Gomery report ===
On November 1, John Gomery released his interim report, and the scandal returned to prominence. Liberal support again fell, with some polls registering an immediate ten percent drop. The Conservatives and Bloc thus resumed their push for an election before Martin's April date. The NDP stated that their support was contingent on the Liberals agreeing to move against the private provision of healthcare. The Liberals and NDP failed to come to an agreement, however, and the NDP joined the two other opposition parties in demanding an election.

However, the Liberals had intentionally scheduled the mandatory "opposition days" (where a specified opposition party controls the agenda) on November 15 (Conservative), November 17 (Bloc Québécois) and November 24 (NDP). These days meant that any election would come over the Christmas season, an unpopular idea. Following negotiations between the opposition parties, they instead issued an ultimatum to the Prime Minister to call an election immediately after the Christmas holidays or face an immediate non-confidence vote which would prompt a holiday-spanning campaign.

To that end, the NDP introduced a parliamentary motion demanding that the government drop the writ in January 2006 for a February 13 election date; however, only the prime minister has the authority to advise the Governor General on an election date, the government was therefore not bound by the NDP's motion. Martin had indicated that he remained committed to his April 2006 date, and would disregard the motion, which the opposition parties managed to pass, as expected, on November 21 by a vote of 167–129.

The three opposition leaders had agreed to delay the tabling of the no-confidence motion until the 24th, to ensure that a conference between the government and aboriginal leaders scheduled on the 24th would not be disrupted by the campaign. Parliamentary procedure dictated that the vote be deferred until the 28th. Even if the opposition had not put forward the non-confidence motion, the government was still expected to fall—there was to have been a vote on supplementary budget estimates on December 8, and if it had been defeated, loss of Supply would have toppled the Liberals.

Conservative leader Stephen Harper, the leader of the Opposition, introduced a motion of no confidence on November 24, which NDP leader Jack Layton seconded. The motion was voted upon and passed in the evening of November 28, with all present MPs from the NDP, Bloc Québécois, and Conservatives and 3 Independents (Bev Desjarlais, David Kilgour and Pat O'Brien), voting with a combined strength of 171 votes for the motion and 132 Liberals and one Independent (Carolyn Parrish) voting against. One Bloc Québécois MP was absent from the vote. It is the fifth time a Canadian government has lost the confidence of Parliament, but the first time this has happened on a straight motion of no confidence. The four previous instances have been due to loss of supply or votes of censure.

Martin visited Governor General Michaëlle Jean the following morning, where he formally advised her to dissolve Parliament and schedule an election for January 23. In accordance with Canadian constitutional practice, she consented (such a request has only been turned down once in Canadian history), officially beginning an election campaign that had been simmering for months.

Early on in the campaign, polls showed the Liberals with a solid 5–10 point lead over the Conservatives, and poised to form a strong minority government at worst. Around Christmas, after reports of an RCMP investigation into allegations of insider trading within the Finance department, this situation changed dramatically, leading to the opposition parties consistently attacking the Liberals on corruption. Almost at the same time, the Boxing Day shooting, an unusually violent gun fight between rival gangs on December 26 in downtown Toronto (resulting in the death of 15-year-old Jane Creba, an innocent bystander), may have swayed some Ontario voters to support the more hardline CPC policies on crime. The Conservatives enjoyed a fairly significant lead in polls leading up to the election, but the gap narrowed in the last few days.

== Issues ==
Several issues—some long-standing (notably fiscal imbalance, the gun registry, abortion, and Quebec sovereignty), others recently brought forth by media coverage (including redressing the Chinese Canadian community for long-standing wrongs that forced both parties to back-track on their position in the national and ethnic media, particularly in key British Columbia and Alberta ridings), or court decisions (the sponsorship scandal, same-sex marriages, income trusts, or Canada–United States relations)—took the fore in debate among the parties and also influenced aspects of the parties' electoral platforms.

Elections Canada later investigated improper election spending by the Conservative Party, which became widely known as the In and Out scandal. In 2011, charges against senior Conservatives were dropped in a plea deal that saw the party and its fundraising arm plead guilty and receive the maximum possible fines, totaling $52,000.

== Opinion polls ==
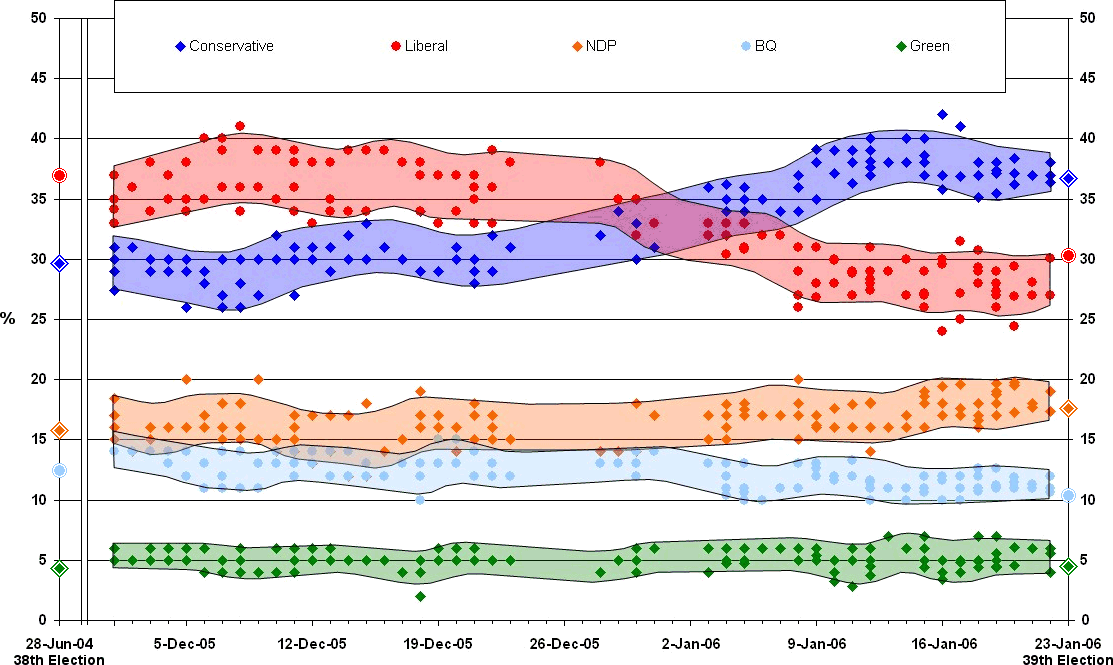
Compiled polling/vote chart showing levels of party support over the course of the election campaign. Note the shift from the Liberals to the Conservatives, during late December and early January.

Prior to and during the election campaign, opinion polling showed variable support for the governing Liberals and opposition Conservatives. In November 2005, the first report by Justice John Gomery was released to the public; subsequently, poll numbers for the Liberals again dropped. Just days later, polling showed the Liberals were already bouncing back; upon the election call, the Liberals held a small lead over the Conservatives and maintained this for much of December. Renewed accusations of corruption and impropriety at the end of 2005 – amid Royal Canadian Mounted Police criminal probes of possible government leaks regarding income trust tax changes and advertising sponsorships – led to an upswing of Conservative support again and gave them a lead over the Liberals, portending a change in government. Ultimately this scandal was linked to a blackberry exchange to a banking official by Liberal candidate Scott Brison. Polling figures for the NDP increased slightly, while Bloc figures experienced a slight dip; figures for the Green Party did not change appreciably throughout the campaign.

== Exit poll ==
An exit poll was carried out by Ipsos Reid polling firm. The poll overestimated the NDP's support and underestimated the Liberals' support. Here is a results breakdown by demographics:

2006 vote by demographic subgroup (Ipsos Reid Exit Polling)
Demographic subgroup	LPC	CPC	NDP	GPC	BQ	Other	% of voters
Total vote	26	36	21	5	12	1	100
Ideological self-placement
Liberals	54	9	25	6	6	1	30
Moderates	17	31	24	6	19	1	51
Conservatives	3	88	4	2	2	1	20
Gender
Men	25	38	18	5	12	1	49
Women	26	33	23	5	11	1	51
Immigrant
Born in Canada	25	36	21	5	13	1	89
Born in another country	34	36	21	6	2	1	11
Marital status
Single	26	25	24	7	17	1	21
Married	26	44	18	4	7	1	52
Domestic Partnership	21	26	24	6	21	1	13
Widowed	28	38	24	3	7	1	3
Divorced	26	30	23	5	14	1	7
Separated	26	32	24	6	10	1	3
Don't know/Won't say	23	22	29	6	18	2	1
Religious identity
Catholic	24	30	15	4	25	1	36
Protestant or Other Christian	26	48	20	4	0	1	37
Muslim	49	15	28	1	5	1	1
Jewish	52	25	15	5	1	1	1
Hindu	43	30	21	5	1	0	0
Sikh	39	16	40	5	4	0	0
Other religion	26	26	33	5	0	1	5
None	25	26	28	8	12	1	19
Don't know/Refused	29	27	26	8	8	2	1
Religious service attendance
More than once a week	18	63	11	3	2	2	5
Once a week	25	51	15	4	3	1	10
A few times a month	30	41	20	4	4	1	6
Once a month	29	36	23	6	6	1	2
A few times a year	29	35	19	4	12	1	16
At least once a year	24	31	19	5	21	1	12
Not at all	25	31	13	6	14	1	48
Don't know/refused	25	31	26	5	10	3	1
Age
18–34 years old	22	29	25	7	17	1	27
35–54 years old	25	37	20	5	11	1	41
55 and older	29	41	17	3	8	1	31
Age by gender
Men 18–34 years old	23	30	23	7	16	1	14
Men 35–54 years old	25	39	18	6	12	1	21
Men 55 and older	26	45	16	4	8	1	14
Women 18–34 years old	21	27	26	7	18	1	13
Women 35–54 years old	25	34	23	5	11	1	21
Women 55 and older	32	36	21	3	8	1	17
Sexual orientation
LGBT	36	8	33	6	17	0	4
Non-LGBT	25	37	20	5	12	1	95
Don't know/Refused	23	24	21	11	10	3	1
First time voter
First time voter	24	29	27	7	12	1	5
Everyone else	26	36	20	5	12	1	95
Education
Primary school or less	27	39	14	2	14	4	0
Some High school	23	38	19	4	14	1	5
High school	22	40	20	4	13	1	16
Some CC/CEGEP/Trades school	23	38	21	5	11	1	17
CC/CEGEP/Trades school	23	37	20	5	12	1	20
Some University	27	32	21	6	13	1	13
University undergraduate degree	29	30	21	7	12	1	18
University graduate degree	33	30	20	6	9	1	10
Don't know/Won't say	26	36	21	5	12	1	0
Smoking
Smoker	23	32	24	5	15	1	22
Non-smoker	26	37	20	5	11	1	17
Employment
Employed full-time	25	35	20	5	13	1	42
Employed part-time	24	35	23	5	11	1	9
Self-employed	27	39	17	6	9	1	10
Homemaker	22	43	20	4	9	1	5
Student	25	20	29	8	17	1	7
Retired	30	41	17	3	9	1	17
Currently unemployed	23	30	25	7	13	2	4
Other	25	30	30	5	9	1	3
Household income
Under $10K	23	26	28	7	14	1	3
$10K to $15K	21	25	30	6	17	1	3
$15K to $20K	24	28	27	6	14	1	3
$20K to $25K	22	30	26	5	15	1	4
$25K to $30K	23	34	22	6	14	2	5
$30K to $35K	22	32	24	5	15	1	6
$35K to $40K	24	34	22	4	14	1	6
$40K to $45K	24	33	21	5	15	1	7
$45K to $55K	24	35	22	4	13	1	10
$55K to $60K	24	38	19	5	13	1	6
$60K to $70K	25	38	21	4	11	1	9
$70K to $80K	27	39	19	4	10	1	9
$80K to $100K	26	39	18	6	10	1	11
$100K to $120K	30	38	17	6	8	1	7
$120K to $150K	32	41	14	6	6	1	5
$150K or more	32	43	14	6	4	1	4
Union membership
Union	22	31	25	5	16	1	32
Non-union	27	38	19	5	10	1	68
Home ownership
Own	26	40	18	5	9	1	68
Rent	24	26	23	5	18	1	28
Neither	22	23	23	6	24	2	3
Region
British Columbia and Yukon	25	37	31	5	n/a	1	13
Alberta, NWT and Nunavut	14	65	14	7	n/a	1	10
Saskatchewan and Manitoba	22	44	28	5	n/a	2	7
Ontario	35	36	23	6	n/a	1	38
Quebec	15	23	10	4	47	1	25
Atlantic Canada	36	30	29	4	n/a	1	8
CMA
Greater Vancouver	30	33	30	5	n/a	1	5
Greater Calgary	14	66	11	9	n/a	0	3
Greater Edmonton	16	60	17	6	n/a	0	3
Greater Toronto Area	40	33	20	6	n/a	1	12
National Capital Region	27	40	19	7	7	1	5
Greater Montreal	20	17	11	5	47	1	12
Rest of Canada	24	37	23	5	10	1	58
Community size
1 Million plus	31	25	19	5	19	1	27
500K to 1M	20	46	18	6	8	1	18
100K to 500K	30	31	28	5	6	0	14
10K to 100K	24	38	22	5	10	1	21
1.5K to 10K	22	41	19	5	11	2	15
Under 1.5K	19	43	18	5	13	1	4
Factor most influencing choice of vote
The local candidate	33	33	19	4	8	3	21
The party leader	27	37	21	1	13	0	17
The party's stances on the issues	23	36	21	7	13	1	61
Issue regarded as most important
Healthcare	27	23	33	3	13	1	15
Corruption	3	61	12	3	19	1	19
Economy	49	27	10	2	11	1	14
Environment	8	3	24	47	17	1	5
Reducing taxes	17	59	12	2	9	1	7
Social programs	27	13	45	2	12	1	11
Abortion and/or gay marriage	33	36	19	3	7	2	10
Jobs	24	27	16	2	23	1	4
National Unity	51	27	16	2	2	1	7
US-Canada relationship	14	71	6	3	4	1	1
Crime	15	66	12	4	2	1	5
Immigration	29	45	18	4	4	0	1
The Atlantic Accord	52	26	14	1	6	0	0
Abortion position
Legal in all cases	29	24	24	6	16	1	40
Legal in most cases	26	36	20	5	12	1	37
Illegal in most cases	17	58	15	4	5	1	13
Illegal in all cases	17	65	11	2	2	3	4
Don't know	25	42	20	5	6	2	6
Gun ownership
Yes	20	46	18	5	9	1	17
No	27	33	21	5	12	1	82
Refused	18	49	18	9	5	2	1

== Candidates ==
The election involved the same 308 electoral districts as in 2004, except in New Brunswick, where the boundary between Acadie—Bathurst and Miramichi was ruled to be illegal. Many of the candidates were also the same: fewer incumbents chose to leave than if they had served a full term, and the parties have generally blocked challenges to sitting MPs for the duration of the minority government, although there had been some exceptions.

=== Gender breakdown of candidates ===
An ongoing issue in Canadian politics is the imbalance between the genders in selection by political parties of candidates. Although in the past some parties, particularly the New Democrats, have focused on the necessity of having equal gender representation in Parliament, no major party has ever nominated as many or more women than men in a given election. In 2006, the New Democrats had the highest percentage of female candidates (35.1%) of any party aside from the Animal Alliance, which only had one candidate, its leader, Liz White. The proportion of female New Democrats elected was greater than the proportion nominated, indicating female New Democrats were nominated in winnable ridings. 12.3% of Conservative candidates and 25.6% of Liberal candidates were female.

Gender breakdown
Party	Leader's gender	Candidates			
Party	Leader's gender	Total	Female	Male	% female
Conservative	M	307	38	270	12.3%
Liberal	M	307	79	229	25.6%
Bloc Québécois	M	75	23	52	30.1%
New Democratic	M	308	108	200	35.1%
Green	M	308	72	236	23.4%
Christian Heritage	M	45	8	37	17.8%
Progressive Canadian	F	25	1	24	4.0%
Marxist–Leninist	F	69	24	45	34.8%
Marijuana	M	23	1	22	4.3%

Gender breakdown
Party	Leader's gender	Candidates			
Party	Leader's gender	Total	Female	Male	% female
Canadian Action	F	34	8	26	23.5%
Communist	M	21	7	14	33.3%
Libertarian	M	10	1	9	10.0%
First Peoples National	F	5	0	5	0.0%
Western Block	M	4	1	3	25.0%
Animal Alliance	F	1	1	0	100.0%
Independent		90	8	82	8.9%
Total		1634	380	1254	23.3%
Source: Elections Canada

== Campaign slogans ==
The parties' campaign slogans for the 2006 election:

	English slogan	French slogan	Literal English translation
Conservative	Stand up for Canada	Changeons pour vrai	Let's change for real / for truth (pun)
Liberal	Choose your Canada	Un Canada à votre image	A Canada in your image
NDP	Getting results for people	Des réalisations concrètes pour les gens	Solid results for people
BQ	Thankfully, the Bloc is here!	Heureusement, ici, c'est le Bloc!	Fortunately, the Bloc is here!
Green	We can	Oui, nous pouvons	Yes, we can

== Incumbent MPs who did not run for re-election ==
=== Liberals ===
- Peter Adams, Peterborough
- David Anderson, Victoria
- Jean Augustine, Etobicoke—Lakeshore
- Don Boudria, Glengarry—Prescott—Russell
- Claudette Bradshaw, Moncton—Riverview—Dieppe
- Marlene Catterall, Ottawa West—Nepean
- Claude Drouin, Beauce
- Paul DeVillers, Simcoe North
- John Efford, Avalon
- Beth Phinney, Hamilton Mountain
- Jerry Pickard, Chatham-Kent—Essex
- Rose-Marie Ur, Middlesex—Kent—Lambton

=== Independents ===
- David Kilgour, Edmonton—Mill Woods—Beaumont
- Pat O'Brien, London—Fanshawe
- Carolyn Parrish, Mississauga—Erindale

=== Conservatives ===
- David Chatters, Westlock—St. Paul
- Gurmant Grewal, Newton—North Delta
- Jim Gouk, British Columbia Southern Interior
- Dale Johnston, Wetaskiwin
- Charlie Penson, Peace River
- John Reynolds, West Vancouver—Sunshine Coast—Sea to Sky Country
- Werner Schmidt, Kelowna—Lake Country
- Darrel Stinson, Okanagan—Shuswap
- Randy White, Abbotsford

=== New Democrats ===
- Ed Broadbent, Ottawa Centre

=== Bloquistes ===
- Alain Boire, Beauharnois—Salaberry
- Marcel Gagnon, Saint-Maurice—Champlain
- Denise Poirier-Rivard, Châteauguay—Saint-Constant

== Electoral district changes ==
The following name changes were made to the electoral districts after the 2004 election:

Renaming of districts
Province	2004 election	Post-election changes
AB	Athabasca	Fort McMurray—Athabasca
AB	Calgary North Centre	Calgary Centre-North
AB	Calgary South Centre	Calgary Centre
AB	Edmonton—Beaumont	Edmonton—Mill Woods—Beaumont
AB	Westlock—St. Paul	Battle River
BC	Dewdney—Alouette	Pitt Meadows—Maple Ridge—Mission
BC	Kamloops—Thompson	Kamloops—Thompson—Cariboo
BC	Kelowna	Kelowna—Lake Country
BC	North Okanagan—Shuswap	Okanagan—Shuswap
BC	Southern Interior	British Columbia Southern Interior
BC	West Vancouver—Sunshine Coast	West Vancouver—Sunshine Coast—Sea to Sky Country
MB	Charleswood—St. James	Charleswood—St. James—Assiniboia
MB	Dauphin—Swan River	Dauphin—Swan River—Marquette
NB	Fundy	Fundy Royal
NB	St. Croix—Belleisle	New Brunswick Southwest
NL	Bonavista—Exploits	Bonavista—Gander—Grand Falls—Windsor
NL	St. John's North	St. John's East
NL	St. John's South	St. John's South—Mount Pearl
NS	North Nova	Cumberland—Colchester—Musquodoboit Valley
ON	Carleton—Lanark	Carleton—Mississippi Mills
ON	Clarington—Scugog—Uxbridge	Durham
ON	Grey—Bruce—Owen Sound	Bruce—Grey—Owen Sound
ON	Kitchener—Conestoga	Kitchener—Wilmot—Wellesley—Woolwich
ON	Middlesex—Kent—Lambton	Lambton—Kent—Middlesex
QC	Argenteuil—Mirabel	Argenteuil—Papineau—Mirabel
QC	Beauport	Beauport—Limoilou
QC	Charlesbourg	Charlesbourg—Haute-Saint-Charles
QC	Charlevoix—Montmorency	Montmorency—Charlevoix—Haute-Côte-Nord
QC	Laurier	Laurier—Sainte-Marie
QC	Longueuil	Longueuil—Pierre-Boucher
QC	Matapédia—Matane	Haute-Gaspésie—La Mitis—Matane—Matapédia
QC	Nunavik—Eeyou	Abitibi—Baie-James—Nunavik—Eeyou
QC	Portneuf	Portneuf—Jacques-Cartier
QC	Richelieu	Bas-Richelieu—Nicolet—Bécancour
QC	Rimouski—Témiscouata	Rimouski-Neigette—Témiscouata—Les Basques
QC	Rivière-du-Loup—Montmagny	Montmagny—L'Islet—Kamouraska—Rivière-du-Loup
QC	Roberval	Roberval—Lac-Saint-Jean
SK	Churchill River	Desnethé—Missinippi—Churchill River

In 2005, further changes were made:

- Battle River and Kitchener—Wilmot—Wellesley—Woolwich reverted to their prior names, following passage of two private member's bills.
- A minor boundary adjustment was made between Acadie—Bathurst and Miramichi.

== Results ==
The election was held on January 23, 2006. The first polls closed at 7:00 p.m. ET (0000 UTC); Elections Canada started to publish preliminary results on its website at 10:00 p.m. ET as the last polls closed. Harper was reelected in Calgary Southwest, which he has held since 2002, ensuring that he had a seat in the new parliament. Shortly after midnight (ET) that night, incumbent Prime Minister Paul Martin conceded defeat, and announced that he would resign as leader of the Liberal Party. At 9:30 a.m. on January 24, Martin informed Governor General Michaëlle Jean that he would not form a government and intended to resign as Prime Minister. Later that day, at 6:45 p.m., Jean invited Harper to form a government. Martin formally resigned and Harper was formally appointed and sworn in as Prime Minister on February 6. Harper became the first leader of a political party to lead it to victory following a loss in the previous election since Wilfrid Laurier in 1896.

Choosing not to take on the office of Leader of the Opposition, the first defeated Prime Minister who had retained his seat not to do so, Martin stepped down as parliamentary leader of his party on February 1, and the Liberal caucus appointed Bill Graham, MP for Toronto Centre and outgoing Defence Minister, as his interim successor. It was announced a month later that there would be a Liberal leadership convention later in the year, during which Stéphane Dion won the leadership of the Liberal Party. Martin continued to sit as a Member of Parliament representing LaSalle—Émard, the Montreal-area riding he had held since 1988, until his retirement in 2008.

=== Overall results ===
The elections resulted in a Conservative minority government with 124 seats in parliament with a Liberal opposition and a strengthened NDP. In his speech following the loss, Martin stated he would not lead the Liberal Party of Canada in another election. Preliminary results indicated that 64.9% of registered voters cast a ballot, a notable increase over 2004's 60.9%.

The NDP won new seats in British Columbia and Ontario as their overall popular vote increased 2% from 2004. The Bloc managed to win almost as many seats as in 2004 despite losing a significant percentage of the vote. Most of the Conservatives' gains were in rural Ontario and Quebec as they took a net loss in the west, but won back the only remaining Liberal seat in Alberta. The popular vote of the Conservatives and Liberals were almost the mirror image of 2004, though the Conservatives were not able to translate this into as many seats as the Liberals did in 2004.

A judicial recount was automatically scheduled in the Parry Sound-Muskoka riding, where early results showed Conservative Tony Clement only 21 votes ahead of Liberal Andy Mitchell, because the difference of votes cast between the two leading candidates was less than 0.1%. Clement was confirmed as the winner by 28 votes.

Conservative candidate Jeremy Harrison, narrowly defeated by Liberal Gary Merasty in the Saskatchewan riding of Desnethé—Missinippi—Churchill River by 72 votes, alleged electoral fraud but decided not to pursue the matter. A judicial recount was ordered in the riding, which certified Gary Merasty the winner by a reduced margin of 68 votes.

Elections to the 39th Canadian Parliament (2006)
Party	Leader	Candidates	Votes				Seats				
Party	Leader	Candidates	#	±	%	Change (pp)	2004	2006	±	G	L
Conservative	Stephen Harper	308	5,374,071	1,354,573▲	36.27	6.64	99	124 / 308	25▲	32	7
Liberal	Paul Martin	308	4,479,415	502,805▼	30.23	-6.50	135	103 / 308	32▼	5	37
New Democratic	Jack Layton	308	2,589,597	462,194▲	17.48	1.79	19	29 / 308	10▲	11	1
Bloc Québécois	Gilles Duceppe	75	1,553,201	126,908▼	10.48	-1.90	54	51 / 308	3▼	6	9
Green	Jim Harris	308	664,068	81,821▲	4.48	0.19					
Independent		90	81,860	16,996▲	0.55	0.07	1	1 / 308	Steady	1	1
Christian Heritage	Ron Gray	45	28,152	12,183▼	0.19	-0.11					
Progressive Canadian	Tracy Parsons	25	14,151	3,279▲	0.10	0.02					
Marijuana	Blair Longley	23	9,171	24,105▼	0.06	-0.18					
Marxist–Leninist	Sandra L. Smith	69	8,980	284▲	0.06	–					
Canadian Action	Connie Fogal	34	6,102	2,705▼	0.04	-0.02					
Communist	Miguel Figueroa	21	3,022	1,404▼	0.02	-0.01					
Libertarian	Jean-Serge Brisson	10	3,002	1,053▲	0.02	0.01					
First Peoples National	Barbara Wardlaw	5	1,201	1,201▲	0.01	New					
Western Block	Doug Christie	4	1,094	1,094▲	0.01	New					
Animal Alliance	Liz White	1	72	72▲	–	New					
Total		1,634	14,817,159		100.00%						
Rejected ballots			91,544	27,324▼							
Turnout			14,908,703	1,344,001▲	64.67%	4.30▲					
Registered voters			23,054,615	587,994▲							

=== Synopsis of results ===
Results by riding — 2006 Canadian federal election
Riding		2004	Winning party					Turnout (Note: including spoilt ballots)	Votes (Note: minor political parties receiving less than 1% of the national popular vote are aggregated under "Other"; independent candidates are aggregated separately)							
Riding		2004	Party	Votes	Share	Margin #	Margin %	Turnout	Con	Lib	NDP	BQ	Green	Ind	Other	Total
AB	Calgary Centre	Con	Con	30,213	55.41%	19,749	36.22%	62.02%	30,213	10,464	7,227	–	6,372	–	250	54,526
AB	Calgary Centre-North	Con	Con	31,174	56.00%	21,833	39.22%	63.80%	31,174	7,628	9,341	–	6,573	383	568	55,667
AB	Calgary East	Con	Con	26,766	67.10%	21,356	53.54%	50.45%	26,766	5,410	4,338	–	2,954	–	422	39,890
AB	Calgary Northeast	Con	Con	27,169	64.86%	17,928	42.80%	52.13%	27,169	9,241	3,284	–	1,833	364	–	41,891
AB	Calgary—Nose Hill	Con	Con	37,815	68.49%	28,372	51.38%	63.83%	37,815	9,443	4,385	–	3,573	–	–	55,216
AB	Calgary Southeast	Con	Con	44,987	75.18%	38,794	64.83%	67.08%	44,987	6,193	4,584	–	4,076	–	–	59,840
AB	Calgary Southwest	Con	Con	41,549	72.36%	34,996	60.95%	66.57%	41,549	6,553	4,628	–	4,407	–	279	57,416
AB	Calgary West	Con	Con	38,020	58.71%	23,692	36.58%	69.95%	38,020	14,328	5,370	–	6,653	–	390	64,761
AB	Crowfoot	Con	Con	43,210	82.56%	39,335	75.15%	64.81%	43,210	2,908	3,875	–	2,347	–	–	52,340
AB	Edmonton Centre	Lib	Con	25,805	44.85%	3,609	6.27%	62.55%	25,805	22,196	6,187	–	3,021	204	117	57,530
AB	Edmonton East	Con	Con	25,086	50.13%	11,998	23.98%	55.28%	25,086	13,088	9,243	–	2,623	–	–	50,040
AB	Edmonton—Leduc	Con	Con	33,764	60.53%	22,908	41.07%	66.80%	33,764	10,856	7,685	–	3,479	–	–	55,784
AB	Edmonton—Mill Woods—Beaumont	Lib	Con	27,191	58.62%	17,382	37.47%	61.88%	27,191	9,809	6,749	–	2,073	477	85	46,384
AB	Edmonton—St. Albert	Con	Con	34,997	59.69%	23,104	39.41%	63.60%	34,997	11,893	8,218	–	3,520	–	–	58,628
AB	Edmonton—Sherwood Park	Con	Con	34,740	63.97%	26,939	49.61%	64.53%	34,740	7,801	7,773	–	3,992	–	–	54,306
AB	Edmonton—Spruce Grove	Con	Con	38,826	66.83%	29,050	50.00%	63.45%	38,826	9,776	6,091	–	3,404	–	–	58,097
AB	Edmonton—Strathcona	Con	Con	22,009	41.71%	4,856	9.20%	68.23%	22,009	9,391	17,153	–	3,139	–	1,078	52,770
AB	Fort McMurray—Athabasca	Con	Con	20,400	64.66%	15,737	49.88%	48.32%	20,400	4,663	4,602	–	1,547	–	337	31,549
AB	Lethbridge	Con	Con	35,061	67.30%	27,926	53.61%	62.68%	35,061	5,859	7,135	–	1,846	735	1,458	52,094
AB	Macleod	Con	Con	37,534	75.45%	32,938	66.21%	65.65%	37,534	4,596	3,251	–	3,075	1,055	235	49,746
AB	Medicine Hat	Con	Con	35,670	79.71%	31,933	71.36%	56.32%	35,670	3,737	3,598	–	1,746	–	–	44,751
AB	Peace River	Con	Con	27,785	56.97%	17,903	36.71%	54.73%	27,785	4,573	5,427	–	1,102	9,882	–	48,769
AB	Red Deer	Con	Con	38,375	75.75%	33,341	65.81%	58.73%	38,375	4,636	5,034	–	2,618	–	–	50,663
AB	Vegreville—Wainwright	Con	Con	37,954	74.17%	33,227	64.93%	64.57%	37,954	3,873	4,727	–	3,822	–	795	51,171
AB	Westlock—St. Paul	Con	Con	29,698	68.22%	23,167	53.22%	60.44%	29,698	6,531	4,368	–	2,136	797	–	43,530
AB	Wetaskiwin	Con	Con	35,776	75.15%	31,335	65.82%	62.86%	35,776	4,371	4,441	–	3,016	–	–	47,604
AB	Wild Rose	Con	Con	39,487	72.17%	33,558	61.33%	66.69%	39,487	5,331	3,968	–	5,929	–	–	54,715
AB	Yellowhead	Con	Con	30,640	71.19%	25,928	60.24%	60.19%	30,640	4,066	4,712	–	2,856	–	765	43,039
BC	Abbotsford	Con	Con	29,825	63.27%	21,821	46.29%	60.33%	29,825	5,976	8,004	–	2,740	–	593	47,138
BC	British Columbia Southern Interior	Con	NDP	22,742	48.96%	13,359	28.76%	65.27%	8,948	9,383	22,742	–	5,258	–	123	46,454
BC	Burnaby—Douglas	NDP	NDP	17,323	35.57%	1,244	2.55%	62.26%	13,467	16,079	17,323	–	1,694	–	138	48,701
BC	Burnaby—New Westminster	NDP	NDP	17,391	38.79%	3,971	8.86%	60.09%	12,364	13,420	17,391	–	1,654	–	–	44,829
BC	Cariboo—Prince George	Con	Con	19,624	44.94%	9,115	20.87%	59.18%	19,624	10,509	10,129	–	2,416	–	988	43,666
BC	Chilliwack—Fraser Canyon	Con	Con	26,842	55.99%	16,827	35.10%	62.83%	26,842	8,106	10,015	–	1,929	–	1,049	47,941
BC	Delta—Richmond East	Con	Con	23,595	48.44%	8,068	16.56%	64.13%	23,595	15,527	7,176	–	2,414	–	–	48,712
BC	Esquimalt—Juan de Fuca	Lib	Lib	20,761	34.93%	2,166	3.64%	68.08%	16,327	20,761	18,595	–	3,385	–	361	59,429
BC	Fleetwood—Port Kells	Con	Con	14,577	33.47%	828	1.90%	59.44%	14,577	13,749 (Note: Brenda Locke was a member of the Legislative Assembly of British Columbia.)	10,961	–	1,059	3,202	–	43,548
BC	Kamloops—Thompson—Cariboo	Con	Con	20,948	39.27%	4,531	8.50%	63.02%	20,948	13,454	16,417	–	2,518	–	–	53,337
BC	Kelowna—Lake Country	Con	Con	28,174	49.17%	13,367	23.33%	63.40%	28,174	14,807	9,538	–	4,562	–	223	57,304
BC	Kootenay—Columbia	Con	Con	22,181	54.36%	11,621	28.48%	64.39%	22,181	5,443	10,560	–	2,490	–	132	40,806
BC	Langley	Con	Con	28,577	52.57%	16,024	29.48%	66.08%	28,577	12,553	9,993	–	3,023	–	211	54,357
BC	Nanaimo—Alberni	Con	Con	26,102	41.36%	5,767	9.14%	68.77%	26,102	12,023	20,335	–	3,379	920	343	63,102
BC	Nanaimo—Cowichan	NDP	NDP	28,558	46.77%	8,943	14.65%	66.63%	19,615	9,352	28,558	–	3,107	–	425	61,057
BC	New Westminster—Coquitlam	Con	NDP	19,427	38.32%	2,933	5.79%	65.29%	16,494	11,931 (Note: Joyce Murray was previously a member of the Legislative Assembly of British Columbia)	19,427	–	1,496	1,297	54	50,699
BC	Newton—North Delta	Con	Lib	15,006	34.25%	1,000	2.28%	63.09%	13,416	15,006	14,006	–	853	425	112	43,818
BC	North Vancouver	Lib	Lib	25,357	42.35%	3,336	5.57%	69.89%	22,021	25,357	7,903	–	4,483	–	112	59,876
BC	Okanagan—Coquihalla	Con	Con	25,278	50.24%	13,703	27.23%	62.83%	25,278	11,575	9,660	–	3,802	–	–	50,315
BC	Okanagan—Shuswap	Con	Con	24,448	44.86%	9,897	18.16%	64.35%	24,448	12,330	14,551	–	2,215	784	172	54,500
BC	Pitt Meadows—Maple Ridge—Mission	Con	Con	20,946	40.19%	2,721	5.22%	64.14%	20,946	10,556	18,225	–	1,694	277	422	52,120
BC	Port Moody—Westwood—Port Coquitlam	Con	Con	19,961	41.12%	6,827	14.06%	63.19%	19,961	13,134	11,196	–	1,623	2,317	309	48,540
BC	Prince George—Peace River	Con	Con	22,412	59.89%	16,035	42.85%	53.35%	22,412	5,889	6,377	–	2,394	351	–	37,423
BC	Richmond	Lib	Lib	18,712	42.83%	1,808	4.14%	56.28%	16,904	18,712	6,106	–	1,967	–	–	43,689
BC	Saanich—Gulf Islands	Con	Con	24,416	37.15%	6,971	10.61%	73.24%	24,416	17,144	17,445	–	6,533	–	183	65,721
BC	Skeena—Bulkley Valley	NDP	NDP	18,496	48.33%	5,866	15.33%	63.13%	12,630	4,845	18,496	–	1,064	–	1,235	38,270
BC	South Surrey—White Rock—Cloverdale	Con	Con	26,383	46.68%	9,047	16.01%	69.79%	26,383	17,336	9,525	–	2,980	–	293	56,517
BC	Surrey North	Ind	NDP	16,307	45.69%	6,443	18.05%	55.23%	9,864	6,991	16,307 (Note: Penny Priddy was previously a member of the Legislative Assembly of British Columbia)	–	961	932	632	35,687
BC	Vancouver Centre	Lib	Lib	25,013	43.80%	8,639	15.13%	62.06%	11,684	25,013	16,374	–	3,340	–	693	57,104
BC	Vancouver East	NDP	NDP	23,927	56.57%	14,020	33.15%	55.42%	5,631	9,907	23,927	–	2,536	–	293	42,294
BC	Vancouver Island North	Con	NDP	23,552	41.73%	616	1.09%	67.19%	22,936	7,239	23,552	–	2,715	–	–	56,442
BC	Vancouver Kingsway	Lib	Lib	20,062	43.45%	4,592	9.95%	58.74%	8,679	20,062	15,470	–	1,307	–	650	46,168
BC	Vancouver Quadra	Lib	Lib	28,655	49.14%	11,811	20.25%	67.56%	16,844	28,655	9,379	–	2,974	263	199	58,314
BC	Vancouver South	Lib	Lib	20,991	48.05%	9,135	20.91%	56.35%	11,856	20,991	9,205	–	1,435	–	202	43,689
BC	Victoria	Lib	NDP	23,839	38.46%	6,783	10.94%	70.99%	15,249	17,056	23,839	–	5,036	282	519	61,981
BC	West Vancouver—Sunshine Coast—Sea to Sky Country	Con	Lib	23,867	37.51%	976	1.53%	68.32%	22,891	23,867	12,766	–	3,966	–	145	63,635
MB	Brandon—Souris	Con	Con	20,247	54.43%	12,719	34.19%	60.32%	20,247	6,696	7,528	–	1,707	611	410	37,199
MB	Charleswood—St. James—Assiniboia	Con	Con	20,791	46.98%	4,692	10.60%	69.39%	20,791	16,099	5,669	–	1,700	–	–	44,259
MB	Churchill	NDP	Lib	10,157	40.68%	3,064	12.27%	53.63%	2,886	10,157	7,093	–	401	4,429 (Note: Bev Desjarlais, the incumbent elected under the NDP banner, received 4,283 votes.)	–	24,966
MB	Dauphin—Swan River—Marquette	Con	Con	20,084	59.08%	13,863	40.78%	62.01%	20,084	6,171	6,221	–	1,246	–	273	33,995
MB	Elmwood—Transcona	NDP	NDP	16,967	50.85%	6,247	18.72%	58.20%	10,720	4,108	16,967	–	1,211	–	363	33,369
MB	Kildonan—St. Paul	Con	Con	17,524	43.13%	3,927	9.67%	65.99%	17,524	13,597	8,193	–	1,101	213	–	40,628
MB	Portage—Lisgar	Con	Con	25,719	69.78%	21,520	58.39%	61.66%	25,719	4,199	4,072	–	1,880	–	987	36,857
MB	Provencher	Con	Con	25,199	65.68%	19,122	49.84%	63.78%	25,199	6,077	5,259	–	1,830	–	–	38,365
MB	Saint Boniface	Lib	Lib	16,417	38.59%	1,524	3.58%	66.67%	14,893	16,417	9,311	–	1,640	–	285	42,546
MB	Selkirk—Interlake	Con	Con	21,661	48.99%	5,303	11.99%	66.59%	21,661	4,436	16,358	–	1,283	277	204	44,219
MB	Winnipeg Centre	NDP	NDP	13,805	48.43%	6,865	24.08%	49.03%	5,554	6,940	13,805	–	2,010	–	199	28,508
MB	Winnipeg North	NDP	NDP	15,582	57.18%	9,830	36.07%	50.57%	4,810	5,752	15,582	–	779	–	330	27,253
MB	Winnipeg South	Lib	Con	17,328	41.42%	111	0.27%	69.41%	17,328	17,217	5,743	–	1,289	–	259	41,836
MB	Winnipeg South Centre	Lib	Lib	16,296	39.25%	3,219	7.75%	69.49%	13,077	16,296	9,055	–	1,848	246	1,000	41,522
NB	Acadie—Bathurst	NDP	NDP	25,195	49.90%	9,691	19.19%	75.46%	8,513	15,504	25,195	–	699	581	–	50,492
NB	Beauséjour	Lib	Lib	22,012	47.55%	7,093	15.32%	75.22%	14,919	22,012	7,717	–	1,290	357	–	46,295
NB	Fredericton	Lib	Lib	19,649	41.80%	3,357	7.14%	67.99%	16,292	19,649	9,988	–	884	198	–	47,011
NB	Fundy Royal	Con	Con	17,630	48.31%	7,651	20.97%	67.86%	17,630	9,979	7,696	–	1,189	–	–	36,494
NB	Madawaska—Restigouche	Lib	Lib	13,734	38.02%	885	2.45%	69.47%	12,849 (Note: Jean-Pierre Ouellet was a member of the Legislative Assembly of New Brunswick.)	13,734	8,322	–	1,220	–	–	36,125
NB	Miramichi	Lib	Lib	13,960	42.27%	2,710	8.21%	73.72%	11,250	13,960	5,587	–	587	1,640 (Note: Danny Gay was a member of the Legislative Assembly of New Brunswick.)	–	33,024
NB	Moncton—Riverview—Dieppe	Lib	Lib	22,918	47.71%	8,454	17.60%	66.87%	14,464	22,918	9,095	–	1,409	–	150	48,036
NB	New Brunswick Southwest	Con	Con	18,155	54.80%	9,278	28.00%	66.79%	18,155	8,877	5,178	–	922	–	–	33,132
NB	Saint John	Lib	Lib	17,202	42.92%	1,449	3.62%	61.39%	15,753	17,202	6,267	–	858	–	–	40,080
NB	Tobique—Mactaquac	Lib	Con	15,894	43.78%	336	0.93%	67.75%	15,894	15,558	4,172	–	679	–	–	36,303
NL	Avalon	Lib	Con	19,132	51.55%	4,814	12.97%	59.61%	19,132 (Note: Fabian Manning was previously a member of the Newfoundland House of Assembly)	14,318	3,365	–	297	–	–	37,112
NL	Bonavista—Gander—Grand Falls—Windsor	Lib	Lib	19,866	52.04%	4,490	11.76%	54.20%	15,376	19,866	2,668	–	265	–	–	38,175
NL	Humber—St. Barbe—Baie Verte	Lib	Lib	17,208	52.90%	7,071	21.74%	54.82%	10,137	17,208	4,847	–	339	–	–	32,531
NL	Labrador	Lib	Lib	5,768	50.53%	1,240	10.86%	57.99%	4,528	5,768	1,037	–	82	–	–	11,415
NL	Random—Burin—St. George's	Lib	Lib	13,652	45.49%	1,420	4.73%	52.09%	12,232	13,652	3,702	–	426	–	–	30,012
NL	St. John's East	Con	Con	19,110	46.56%	4,765	11.61%	60.50%	19,110	14,345	7,190	–	402	–	–	41,047
NL	St. John's South—Mount Pearl	Con	Con	16,644	44.69%	4,349	11.68%	57.90%	16,644	12,295	8,073	–	235	–	–	37,247
NS	Cape Breton—Canso	Lib	Lib	21,424	53.19%	11,684	29.01%	66.52%	9,740	21,424	8,111	–	1,006	–	–	40,281
NS	Central Nova	Con	Con	17,134	40.66%	3,273	7.77%	69.17%	17,134	10,349	13,861	–	671	–	124	42,139
NS	Cumberland—Colchester—Musquodoboit Valley	Con	Con	22,439	52.04%	12,140	28.16%	61.85%	22,439	10,299	8,944	–	910	524	–	43,116
NS	Dartmouth—Cole Harbour	Lib	Lib	19,027	42.32%	4,415	9.82%	62.44%	10,259	19,027	14,612	–	1,005	–	56	44,959
NS	Halifax	NDP	NDP	23,420	46.88%	7,983	15.98%	65.25%	8,993	15,437	23,420	–	1,948	–	164	49,962
NS	Halifax West	Lib	Lib	21,818	49.36%	11,020	24.93%	63.05%	10,184	21,818	10,798	–	1,406	–	–	44,206
NS	Kings—Hants	Lib	Lib	19,491	45.56%	5,719	13.37%	65.19%	13,772	19,491	8,138	–	947	–	436	42,784
NS	Sackville—Eastern Shore	NDP	NDP	22,848	52.95%	12,927	29.96%	62.44%	9,450	9,921	22,848	–	933	–	–	43,152
NS	South Shore—St. Margaret's	Con	Con	15,108	36.85%	3,419	8.34%	60.56%	15,108	11,629	11,689	–	1,198	–	1,376	41,000
NS	Sydney—Victoria	Lib	Lib	20,277	49.88%	8,690	21.37%	63.30%	7,455	20,277	11,587	–	1,336	–	–	40,655
NS	West Nova	Lib	Lib	17,734	39.24%	512	1.13%	63.68%	17,222 (Note: Greg Kerr was a member of the Nova Scotia House of Assembly.)	17,734	8,512	–	1,040	682	–	45,190
ON	Ajax—Pickering	Lib	Lib	25,636	49.38%	8,644	16.65%	67.64%	16,992	25,636	6,655	–	2,199	–	435	51,917
ON	Algoma—Manitoulin—Kapuskasing	Lib	Lib	14,652	38.18%	1,408	3.67%	63.99%	8,957	14,652	13,244	–	1,025	164	338	38,380
ON	Ancaster—Dundas—Flamborough—Westdale	Lib	Con	24,530	39.10%	2,874	4.58%	74.80%	24,530	21,656	13,376	–	2,767	303	112	62,744
ON	Barrie	Lib	Con	23,999	41.88%	1,543	2.69%	65.35%	23,999	22,456	6,978	–	3,875	–	–	57,308
ON	Beaches—East York	Lib	Lib	20,678	40.39%	2,778	5.43%	70.51%	9,238	20,678	17,900 (Note: Marilyn Churley was a member of the Legislative Assembly of Ontario.)	–	3,106	–	274	51,196
ON	Bramalea—Gore—Malton	Lib	Lib	25,348	50.68%	8,981	17.96%	59.61%	16,367	25,348	6,343	–	1,721	–	233	50,012
ON	Brampton—Springdale	Lib	Lib	22,294	47.34%	7,802	16.57%	61.15%	14,492	22,294	8,345	–	1,853	–	110	47,094
ON	Brampton West	Lib	Lib	27,988	49.12%	7,643	13.41%	59.13%	20,345	27,988	6,310	–	2,340	–	–	56,983
ON	Brant	Lib	Lib	22,077	36.95%	582	0.97%	65.30%	21,495	22,077	12,713	–	2,729	213	526	59,753
ON	Bruce—Grey—Owen Sound	Con	Con	25,133	48.18%	10,755	20.62%	67.88%	25,133	14,378	5,918	–	6,735	–	–	52,164
ON	Burlington	Lib	Con	28,030	43.11%	2,599	4.00%	72.96%	28,030	25,431	8,090	–	3,471	–	–	65,022
ON	Cambridge	Con	Con	25,337	43.85%	5,918	10.24%	64.97%	25,337	19,419	9,794	–	3,017	–	217	57,784
ON	Carleton—Mississippi Mills	Con	Con	39,004	56.19%	22,644	32.62%	75.60%	39,004	16,360	8,677	–	4,544	–	834	69,419
ON	Chatham-Kent—Essex	Lib	Con	20,820	42.81%	5,616	11.55%	65.27%	20,820	15,204	10,875	–	1,737	–	–	48,636
ON	Davenport	Lib	Lib	20,172	51.87%	7,491	19.26%	60.58%	4,202	20,172	12,681	–	1,440	–	397	38,892
ON	Don Valley East	Lib	Lib	23,441	54.00%	10,780	24.83%	63.79%	12,661	23,441	5,597	–	1,714	–	–	43,413
ON	Don Valley West	Lib	Lib	28,709	53.36%	10,801	20.08%	68.50%	17,908	28,709	4,902	–	1,906	–	377	53,802
ON	Dufferin—Caledon	Con	Con	23,641	47.94%	8,864	17.97%	64.94%	23,641	14,777	5,983	–	4,912	–	–	49,313
ON	Durham	Con	Con	27,087	47.02%	9,797	17.01%	69.26%	27,087	17,290	9,946	–	2,676	–	612	57,611
ON	Eglinton—Lawrence	Lib	Lib	26,044	52.89%	11,147	22.64%	67.61%	14,897	26,044	5,660	–	2,520	123	–	49,244
ON	Elgin—Middlesex—London	Con	Con	23,416	45.62%	9,899	19.29%	66.19%	23,416	13,517	9,873	–	2,873	–	1,648	51,327
ON	Essex	Con	Con	23,125	40.40%	3,615	6.32%	66.37%	23,125	19,510	12,993	–	1,507	–	108	57,243
ON	Etobicoke Centre	Lib	Lib	29,509	52.44%	10,807	19.21%	71.95%	18,702	29,509	5,426	–	2,111	–	519	56,267
ON	Etobicoke—Lakeshore	Lib	Lib	24,337	43.63%	4,724	8.47%	69.04%	19,613	24,337	8,685	–	2,853	–	290	55,778
ON	Etobicoke North	Lib	Lib	22,195	61.62%	14,146	39.27%	59.04%	8,049	22,195	3,820	–	950	273	731	36,018
ON	Glengarry—Prescott—Russell	Lib	Con	22,990	41.56%	203	0.37%	71.33%	22,990	22,787	7,049	–	2,494	–	–	55,320
ON	Guelph	Lib	Lib	23,662	38.39%	5,320	8.63%	70.76%	18,342	23,662	13,561	–	5,376	–	694	61,635
ON	Haldimand—Norfolk	Con	Con	25,885	48.33%	7,522	14.04%	67.74%	25,885	18,363	6,858	–	1,894	–	559	53,559
ON	Haliburton—Kawartha Lakes—Brock	Con	Con	29,427	49.00%	12,161	20.25%	67.57%	29,427	17,266	10,340	–	3,017	–	–	60,050
ON	Halton	Lib	Con	30,577	44.18%	1,897	2.74%	70.31%	30,577	28,680	6,114	–	3,843	–	–	69,214
ON	Hamilton Centre	NDP	NDP	24,503	51.29%	13,279	27.79%	59.21%	9,696	11,224	24,503	–	2,022	–	332	47,777
ON	Hamilton East—Stoney Creek	Lib	NDP	19,346	36.03%	466	0.87%	63.03%	13,581	18,880	19,346	–	1,573	–	316	53,696
ON	Hamilton Mountain	Lib	NDP	21,970	37.43%	3,266	5.56%	67.27%	15,915	18,704	21,970	–	1,517	–	590	58,696
ON	Huron—Bruce	Lib	Lib	21,260	39.84%	971	1.82%	70.18%	20,289	21,260	8,696	–	1,829	270	1,019	53,363
ON	Kenora	Lib	Lib	9,937	36.52%	1,503	5.52%	63.48%	8,434	9,937	8,149	–	692	–	–	27,212
ON	Kingston and the Islands	Lib	Lib	28,548	45.86%	12,318	19.79%	65.97%	16,230	28,548	11,946	–	5,006	296	222	62,248
ON	Kitchener Centre	Lib	Lib	21,714	43.26%	5,583	11.12%	64.70%	16,131	21,714	9,253	–	2,822	–	274	50,194
ON	Kitchener—Conestoga	Lib	Con	20,615	41.22%	1,369	2.74%	64.65%	20,615	19,246	7,445	–	2,706	–	–	50,012
ON	Kitchener—Waterloo	Lib	Lib	31,136	46.85%	12,319	18.54%	70.39%	18,817	31,136	11,889	–	4,298	173	144	66,457
ON	Lambton—Kent—Middlesex	Lib	Con	25,170	46.36%	8,335	15.35%	69.10%	25,170	16,835	9,330	–	2,156	–	797	54,288
ON	Lanark—Frontenac—Lennox and Addington	Con	Con	30,367	51.07%	15,658	26.33%	67.67%	30,367	14,709	9,604	–	3,115	–	1,665	59,460
ON	Leeds—Grenville	Con	Con	28,447	54.65%	15,786	30.33%	70.51%	28,447	12,661	7,945	–	3,003	–	–	52,056
ON	London—Fanshawe	Lib	NDP	16,067	34.51%	868	1.86%	62.23%	13,495	15,199	16,067 (Note: Irene Mathyssen was previously a member of the Legislative Assembly of Ontario.)	–	1,803	–	–	46,564
ON	London North Centre	Lib	Lib	24,109	40.12%	6,141	10.22%	66.14%	17,968	24,109	14,271	–	3,300	–	443	60,091
ON	London West	Lib	Lib	23,019	37.70%	1,329	2.18%	70.57%	21,690	23,019	13,056	–	2,900	–	387	61,052
ON	Markham—Unionville	Lib	Lib	32,769	61.89%	18,616	35.16%	61.74%	14,153	32,769	4,257	–	1,146	297	321	52,943
ON	Mississauga—Brampton South	Lib	Lib	27,370	53.94%	11,765	23.19%	60.01%	15,605	27,370	5,521	–	1,927	–	319	50,742
ON	Mississauga East—Cooksville	Lib	Lib	23,530	51.65%	9,204	20.20%	58.34%	14,326	23,530	5,180	–	1,393	496	631	45,556
ON	Mississauga—Erindale	Lib	Lib	26,852	44.81%	3,328	5.55%	65.50%	23,524	26,852	6,644	–	2,613	289	–	59,922
ON	Mississauga South	Lib	Lib	23,018	44.17%	2,130	4.09%	68.31%	20,888	23,018	5,607	–	2,393	–	203	52,109
ON	Mississauga—Streetsville	Lib	Lib	23,913	45.95%	5,792	11.13%	64.16%	18,121	23,913	6,929	–	2,334	–	747	52,044
ON	Nepean—Carleton	Con	Con	39,512	54.97%	19,401	26.99%	75.76%	39,512	20,111	8,274	–	3,976	–	–	71,873
ON	Newmarket—Aurora	Con	Lib	27,176	46.21%	4,800	8.16%	72.17%	22,376	27,176	5,639	–	2,813	–	808	58,812
ON	Niagara Falls	Con	Con	23,485	40.36%	3,393	5.83%	63.22%	23,485	20,092	12,209	–	2,402	–	–	58,188
ON	Niagara West—Glanbrook	Con	Con	27,351	47.38%	9,639	16.70%	72.35%	27,351	17,712	9,251	–	2,284	–	1,132	57,730
ON	Nickel Belt	Lib	Lib	19,775	43.31%	2,107	4.61%	66.32%	5,732	19,775	17,668	–	975	–	1,507	45,657
ON	Nipissing—Timiskaming	Lib	Lib	21,393	44.69%	4,882	10.20%	67.59%	16,511	21,393	8,268	–	1,698	–	–	47,870
ON	Northumberland—Quinte West	Lib	Con	25,833	41.21%	3,267	5.21%	67.43%	25,833	22,566	11,334	–	2,946	–	–	62,679
ON	Oak Ridges—Markham	Lib	Lib	35,083	47.06%	6,400	8.58%	66.89%	28,683	35,083	7,367	–	3,423	–	–	74,556
ON	Oakville	Lib	Lib	25,892	43.35%	744	1.25%	73.95%	25,148 (Note: Terence Young was previously a member of the Legislative Assembly of Ontario.)	25,892	5,815	–	2,872	–	–	59,727
ON	Oshawa	Con	Con	20,657	38.61%	2,752	5.14%	63.87%	20,657	12,831	17,905	–	2,019	–	91	53,503
ON	Ottawa Centre	NDP	NDP	24,609	36.94%	5,141	7.72%	72.80%	15,105	19,468	24,609	–	6,765	121	558	66,626
ON	Ottawa—Orléans	Lib	Con	25,455	41.06%	1,231	1.99%	75.07%	25,455	24,224	9,354	–	2,377	578	–	61,988
ON	Ottawa South	Lib	Lib	27,158	44.15%	4,130	6.71%	71.71%	23,028	27,158	8,138	–	2,913	–	273	61,510
ON	Ottawa—Vanier	Lib	Lib	23,567	42.31%	7,597	13.64%	68.45%	15,970	23,567	12,145	–	3,675	–	338	55,695
ON	Ottawa West—Nepean	Lib	Con	25,607	43.07%	5,357	9.01%	71.38%	25,607 (Note: John Baird was previously a member of the Legislative Assembly of Ontario and a provincial Cabinet minister.)	20,250	9,626	–	2,941	905	121	59,450
ON	Oxford	Con	Con	23,140	46.55%	9,179	18.46%	67.14%	23,140	13,961	8,639	–	1,566	–	2,409	49,715
ON	Parkdale—High Park	Lib	NDP	20,790	40.41%	2,301	4.47%	70.33%	8,777	18,489	20,790	–	2,840	119	435	51,450
ON	Parry Sound-Muskoka	Lib	Con	18,513	40.10%	28	0.06%	67.54%	18,513 (Note: Tony Clement was previously a member of the Legislative Assembly of Ontario and a provincial Cabinet minister.)	18,485	5,472	–	3,701	–	–	46,171
ON	Perth Wellington	Con	Con	22,004	46.14%	9,703	20.34%	65.87%	22,004	12,301	8,876	–	3,117	–	1,396	47,694
ON	Peterborough	Lib	Con	22,774	35.90%	2,242	3.53%	69.66%	22,774	20,532	16,286	–	3,205	179	455	63,431
ON	Pickering—Scarborough East	Lib	Lib	27,719	52.68%	11,026	20.96%	69.28%	16,693	27,719	6,090	–	1,869	176	70	52,617
ON	Prince Edward—Hastings	Con	Con	27,787	48.67%	9,753	17.08%	65.62%	27,787	18,034	8,474	–	2,386	416	–	57,097
ON	Renfrew—Nipissing—Pembroke	Con	Con	29,923	57.69%	17,391	33.53%	69.24%	29,923	12,532	6,509	–	1,605	1,304	–	51,873
ON	Richmond Hill	Lib	Lib	27,837	53.58%	11,273	21.70%	61.74%	16,564	27,837	5,176	–	2,379	–	–	51,956
ON	St. Catharines	Lib	Con	21,669	37.47%	246	0.43%	68.30%	21,669	21,423	11,848	–	2,305	–	582	57,827
ON	St. Paul's	Lib	Lib	29,295	50.26%	14,274	24.49%	72.17%	15,021	29,295	11,189	–	2,785	–	–	58,290
ON	Sarnia—Lambton	Lib	Con	21,841	40.98%	4,192	7.87%	67.87%	21,841	17,649	10,673	–	1,712	316	1,108	53,299
ON	Sault Ste. Marie	NDP	NDP	17,979	38.88%	2,154	4.66%	67.75%	11,099	15,825	17,979	–	1,056	–	284	46,243
ON	Scarborough—Agincourt	Lib	Lib	28,065	62.59%	17,381	38.76%	61.74%	10,684	28,065	4,969	–	1,120	–	–	44,838
ON	Scarborough Centre	Lib	Lib	23,332	55.38%	11,810	28.03%	62.11%	11,522	23,332	5,884	–	1,396	–	–	42,134
ON	Scarborough-Guildwood	Lib	Lib	21,877	53.26%	10,087	24.56%	62.38%	11,790	21,877	5,847	–	1,235	232	98	41,079
ON	Scarborough—Rouge River	Lib	Lib	30,285	65.62%	20,853	45.18%	56.97%	9,432	30,285	4,972	–	754	467	243	46,153
ON	Scarborough Southwest	Lib	Lib	19,930	47.83%	9,913	23.79%	62.37%	10,017	19,930	9,626	–	1,827	147	120	41,667
ON	Simcoe—Grey	Con	Con	30,135	49.76%	11,446	18.90%	67.60%	30,135	18,689	6,784	–	3,372	–	1,585	60,565
ON	Simcoe North	Lib	Con	23,266	40.43%	1,188	2.06%	66.94%	23,266	22,078	8,132	–	3,451	–	617	57,544
ON	Stormont—Dundas—South Glengarry	Con	Con	28,014	54.73%	14,108	27.56%	67.86%	28,014	13,906	6,892	–	1,713	–	663	51,188
ON	Sudbury	Lib	Lib	19,809	41.57%	4,584	9.62%	65.99%	10,332	19,809	15,225	–	1,301	54	929	47,650
ON	Thornhill	Lib	Lib	29,934	53.10%	10,929	19.39%	63.75%	19,005	29,934	4,405	–	1,934	–	1,094	56,372
ON	Thunder Bay—Rainy River	Lib	Lib	13,520	35.13%	658	1.71%	61.12%	10,485	13,520	12,862	–	1,193	–	424	38,484
ON	Thunder Bay—Superior North	Lib	Lib	14,009	36.01%	408	1.05%	62.51%	8,578	14,009	13,601	–	2,231	–	486	38,905
ON	Timmins-James Bay	NDP	NDP	19,195	50.58%	6,192	16.32%	62.40%	5,173	13,003	19,195	–	578	–	–	37,949
ON	Toronto Centre	Lib	Lib	30,874	52.23%	16,838	28.48%	66.53%	10,763	30,874	14,036	–	3,080	101	258	59,112
ON	Toronto—Danforth	NDP	NDP	24,412	48.42%	7,156	14.19%	67.67%	4,992	17,256	24,412	–	3,583	–	172	50,415
ON	Trinity—Spadina	Lib	NDP	28,748	46.03%	3,681	5.89%	70.87%	5,625	25,067	28,748	–	2,398	–	612	62,450
ON	Vaughan	Lib	Lib	36,968	59.72%	20,844	33.67%	64.01%	16,124	36,968	5,114	–	3,004	–	688	61,898
ON	Welland	Lib	Lib	20,267	35.53%	2,775	4.86%	67.06%	16,678	20,267	17,492	–	1,960	–	652	57,049
ON	Wellington—Halton Hills	Con	Con	27,907	50.67%	11,842	21.50%	71.05%	27,907	16,065	6,785	–	3,362	355	606	55,080
ON	Whitby—Oshawa	Lib	Con	29,294	43.86%	3,412	5.11%	70.60%	29,294 (Note: Jim Flaherty was previously a member of the Legislative Assembly of Ontario and a provincial Cabinet minister)	25,882	8,716	–	2,407	–	491	66,790
ON	Willowdale	Lib	Lib	30,623	55.23%	14,369	25.92%	62.77%	16,254	30,623	6,297	–	2,268	–	–	55,442
ON	Windsor—Tecumseh	NDP	NDP	22,646	44.63%	9,233	18.19%	60.21%	12,851	13,413	22,646	–	1,644	–	193	50,747
ON	Windsor West	NDP	NDP	23,608	49.49%	11,498	24.10%	57.29%	9,592	12,110	23,608	–	1,444	224	722	47,700
ON	York Centre	Lib	Lib	22,468	52.66%	9,640	22.59%	61.06%	12,828	22,468	5,813	–	1,560	–	–	42,669
ON	York—Simcoe	Con	Con	25,685	47.93%	9,229	17.22%	64.24%	25,685	16,456	7,139	–	3,719	–	595	53,594
ON	York South—Weston	Lib	Lib	22,871	57.06%	14,346	35.79%	59.99%	6,991	22,871	8,525	–	1,506	189	–	40,082
ON	York West	Lib	Lib	21,418	63.78%	15,174	45.19%	57.90%	6,244	21,418	4,724	–	1,002	192	–	33,580
PE	Cardigan	Lib	Lib	11,542	56.21%	4,619	22.50%	75.33%	6,923	11,542	1,535	–	533	–	–	20,533
PE	Charlottetown	Lib	Lib	9,586	50.16%	3,062	16.02%	70.75%	6,524	9,586	2,126	–	586	–	290	19,112
PE	Egmont	Lib	Lib	10,288	53.17%	4,297	22.21%	71.72%	5,991	10,288	1,847	–	1,005	219	–	19,350
PE	Malpeque	Lib	Lib	9,779	50.48%	3,071	15.85%	75.10%	6,708	9,779	1,983	–	901	–	–	19,371
QC	Abitibi—Baie-James—Nunavik—Eeyou	BQ	BQ	13,928	46.57%	7,228	24.17%	53.82%	6,261	6,700	1,810	13,928	1,210	–	–	29,909
QC	Abitibi—Témiscamingue	BQ	BQ	24,637	52.34%	14,003	29.75%	60.02%	10,634	6,501	4,022	24,637	1,279	–	–	47,073
QC	Ahuntsic	Lib	BQ	19,428	38.91%	834	1.67%	67.26%	6,119	18,594	3,948	19,428	1,836	–	–	49,925
QC	Alfred-Pellan	BQ	BQ	23,193	42.97%	8,298	15.37%	68.18%	10,210	14,895	3,838	23,193	1,842	–	–	53,978
QC	Argenteuil—Papineau—Mirabel	BQ	BQ	27,855	52.13%	15,394	28.81%	62.66%	12,461	7,171	3,466	27,855	2,480	–	–	53,433
QC	Bas-Richelieu—Nicolet—Bécancour	BQ	BQ	27,742	55.92%	16,154	32.56%	66.86%	11,588	6,438	2,248	27,742	1,595	–	–	49,611
QC	Beauce	Lib	Con	36,915	67.02%	25,918	47.06%	67.62%	36,915	4,364	1,405	10,997	1,397	–	–	55,078
QC	Beauharnois—Salaberry	BQ	BQ	26,190	47.53%	11,581	21.02%	66.40%	14,609	8,272	4,163	26,190	1,864	–	–	55,098
QC	Beauport—Limoilou	BQ	Con	19,409	39.54%	820	1.67%	59.67%	19,409	4,929	3,917	18,589	2,005	–	234	49,083
QC	Berthier—Maskinongé	BQ	BQ	26,191	48.50%	9,233	17.10%	63.96%	16,958	5,605	3,319	26,191	1,925	–	–	53,998
QC	Bourassa	Lib	Lib	18,705	43.41%	4,928	11.44%	59.68%	6,830	18,705	2,237	13,777	1,370	–	173	43,092
QC	Brome—Missisquoi	Lib	BQ	18,596	38.33%	5,027	10.36%	66.24%	9,874	13,569	2,839	18,596	1,721	–	1,921	48,520
QC	Brossard—La Prairie	Lib	BQ	21,433	37.17%	1,243	2.16%	67.06%	9,749	20,190	4,301	21,433	1,883	–	110	57,666
QC	Chambly—Borduas	BQ	BQ	33,703	54.70%	21,000	34.08%	70.41%	12,703	6,933	5,167	33,703	3,113	–	–	61,619
QC	Charlesbourg—Haute-Saint-Charles	BQ	Con	20,406	41.04%	1,372	2.76%	65.19%	20,406	4,364	3,084	19,034	1,262	1,567	–	49,717
QC	Châteauguay—Saint-Constant	BQ	BQ	28,274	51.38%	17,055	30.99%	67.95%	11,219	10,295	2,865	28,274	2,375	–	–	55,028
QC	Chicoutimi—Le Fjord	BQ	BQ	19,226	38.49%	4,645	9.30%	64.72%	12,350	14,581	2,571	19,226	1,226	–	–	49,954
QC	Compton—Stanstead	BQ	BQ	21,316	42.77%	9,185	18.43%	66.64%	12,131	11,126	3,099	21,316	2,171	–	–	49,843
QC	Drummond	BQ	BQ	22,575	49.69%	12,441	27.38%	64.41%	10,134	7,437	2,870	22,575	2,418	–	–	45,434
QC	Gaspésie—Îles-de-la-Madeleine	BQ	BQ	17,678	42.69%	4,331	10.46%	61.15%	13,347	7,977	1,225	17,678	1,183	–	–	41,410
QC	Gatineau	Lib	BQ	21,093	39.25%	4,267	7.94%	64.88%	9,014	16,826	5,354	21,093	1,456	–	–	53,743
QC	Haute-Gaspésie—La Mitis—Matane—Matapédia	BQ	BQ	15,721	46.04%	5,564	16.30%	58.13%	10,157	4,463	2,116	15,721	910	778	–	34,145
QC	Hochelaga	BQ	BQ	25,570	55.58%	17,638	38.34%	58.31%	5,617	7,932	4,101	25,570	2,235	–	552	46,007
QC	Honoré-Mercier	Lib	Lib	19,622	38.23%	1,743	3.40%	64.87%	8,952	19,622	3,191	17,879	1,502	–	183	51,329
QC	Hull—Aylmer	Lib	Lib	17,576	32.67%	1,788	3.32%	64.25%	9,284	17,576	8,334	15,788	2,687	–	125	53,794
QC	Jeanne-Le Ber	Lib	BQ	20,213	40.22%	3,095	6.16%	58.93%	5,951	17,118	4,621	20,213	2,357	–	–	50,260
QC	Joliette	BQ	BQ	28,630	54.12%	14,438	27.29%	63.77%	14,192	5,245	2,745	28,630	2,086	–	–	52,898
QC	Jonquière—Alma	BQ	Con	27,262	52.09%	6,693	12.79%	67.52%	27,262	1,550	2,028	20,569	928	–	–	52,337
QC	La Pointe-de-l'Île	BQ	BQ	29,368	60.46%	21,966	45.22%	62.32%	7,402	6,855	3,407	29,368	1,544	–	–	48,576
QC	Lac-Saint-Louis	Lib	Lib	25,588	48.17%	11,424	21.50%	66.30%	14,164	25,588	5,702	4,064	3,605	–	–	53,123
QC	LaSalle—Émard	Lib	Lib	22,751	48.41%	9,250	19.68%	62.10%	5,994	22,751	2,805	13,501	1,512	281	152	46,996
QC	Laurentides—Labelle	BQ	BQ	28,217	53.82%	17,551	33.48%	61.42%	10,666	7,616	3,382	28,217	2,543	–	–	52,424
QC	Laurier—Sainte-Marie	BQ	BQ	26,773	54.69%	18,608	38.01%	61.26%	3,124	6,095	8,165	26,773	4,064	157	575	48,953
QC	Laval	BQ	BQ	22,032	44.35%	9,334	18.79%	62.58%	9,236	12,698	4,047	22,032	1,666	–	–	49,679
QC	Laval—Les Îles	Lib	Lib	20,849	39.32%	3,312	6.25%	63.47%	9,055	20,849	3,817	17,537	1,557	–	211	53,026
QC	Lévis—Bellechasse	BQ	Con	25,940	46.40%	9,717	17.38%	65.92%	25,940	4,581	2,590	16,223	2,293	4,275	–	55,902
QC	Longueuil—Pierre-Boucher	BQ	BQ	27,425	55.20%	18,094	36.42%	65.78%	9,331	6,260	4,273	27,425	1,995	–	397	49,681
QC	Lotbinière—Chutes-de-la-Chaudière	BQ	Con	28,236	54.34%	12,834	24.70%	68.36%	28,236	2,820	3,529	15,402	1,978	–	–	51,965
QC	Louis-Hébert	BQ	Con	20,332	34.47%	231	0.39%	71.85%	20,332	8,852	5,351	20,101	2,517	1,712	116	58,981
QC	Louis-Saint-Laurent	BQ	Con	28,606	57.68%	16,609	33.49%	64.01%	28,606	3,180	2,848	11,997	1,468	1,498	–	49,597
QC	Manicouagan	BQ	BQ	18,601	51.10%	11,691	32.12%	57.00%	6,910	5,214	4,657	18,601	824	195	–	36,401
QC	Marc-Aurèle-Fortin	BQ	BQ	27,638	51.00%	16,540	30.52%	68.43%	11,098	8,407	4,313	27,638	2,733	–	–	54,189
QC	Mégantic—L'Érable	BQ	Con	23,550	49.85%	8,140	17.23%	68.64%	23,550	4,912	1,836	15,410	1,534	–	–	47,242
QC	Montcalm	BQ	BQ	34,975	62.28%	24,157	43.02%	63.59%	10,818	4,645	3,766	34,975	1,954	–	–	56,158
QC	Montmagny—L'Islet—Kamouraska—Rivière-du-Loup	BQ	BQ	24,117	52.44%	12,588	27.37%	59.53%	11,529	6,466	2,107	24,117	1,768	–	–	45,987
QC	Montmorency—Charlevoix—Haute-Côte-Nord	BQ	BQ	22,169	49.11%	7,610	16.86%	61.53%	14,559	3,989	2,896	22,169	1,527	–	–	45,140
QC	Mount Royal	Lib	Lib	24,248	65.55%	17,627	47.65%	52.81%	6,621	24,248	2,479	2,112	1,423	–	106	36,989
QC	Notre-Dame-de-Grâce—Lachine	Lib	Lib	20,235	43.85%	10,850	23.51%	60.86%	8,048	20,235	5,455	9,385	2,754	–	270	46,147
QC	Outremont	Lib	Lib	14,282	35.18%	2,504	6.17%	60.78%	5,168	14,282	6,984	11,778 (Note: Jacques Léonard was previously a member of the National Assembly of Quebec and a provincial Cabinet minister.)	1,957	242	182	40,593
QC	Papineau	Lib	BQ	17,775	40.75%	990	2.27%	61.10%	3,630	16,785	3,358	17,775	1,572	–	502	43,622
QC	Pierrefonds—Dollard	Lib	Lib	24,388	51.12%	13,375	28.04%	59.89%	11,013	24,388	3,664	5,901	2,645	–	96	47,707
QC	Pontiac	Lib	Con	16,069	33.68%	2,371	4.97%	61.76%	16,069 (Note: Lawrence Cannon was previously a member of the National Assembly of Quebec and a provincial Cabinet minister.)	11,561	4,759	13,698	1,512	–	107	47,706
QC	Portneuf—Jacques-Cartier	BQ	Ind	20,158	39.84%	7,064	13.96%	69.43%	11,472	2,489	1,956	13,094	1,431	20,158	–	50,600
QC	Québec	BQ	BQ	20,845	41.53%	5,902	11.76%	63.04%	14,943	5,743	4,629	20,845	2,372	813	845	50,190
QC	Repentigny	BQ	BQ	34,958	62.42%	24,834	44.34%	67.46%	10,124	4,847	4,337	34,958	1,742	–	–	56,008
QC	Richmond—Arthabaska	BQ	BQ	24,466	47.89%	8,001	15.66%	65.95%	16,465	5,294	2,507	24,466	2,355	–	–	51,087
QC	Rimouski-Neigette—Témiscouata—Les Basques	BQ	BQ	19,804	46.38%	10,323	24.18%	63.76%	9,481	8,254	4,186	19,804	973	–	–	42,698
QC	Rivière-des-Mille-Îles	BQ	BQ	26,272	53.90%	16,099	33.03%	67.55%	10,173	6,239	3,418	26,272	2,643	–	–	48,745
QC	Rivière-du-Nord	BQ	BQ	27,789	59.08%	18,020	38.31%	60.44%	9,769	4,365	3,393	27,789	1,722	–	–	47,038
QC	Roberval—Lac-Saint-Jean	BQ	BQ	17,586	45.20%	3,123	8.03%	62.15%	14,463	3,014	2,151	17,586	1,689	–	–	38,903
QC	Rosemont—La Petite-Patrie	BQ	BQ	29,336	55.99%	21,077	40.23%	64.02%	4,873	8,259	6,051	29,336	3,457	–	419	52,395
QC	Saint-Bruno—Saint-Hubert	BQ	BQ	26,509	50.29%	16,058	30.46%	68.01%	10,451	8,643	4,359	26,509	2,364	387	–	52,713
QC	Saint-Hyacinthe—Bagot	BQ	BQ	27,838	56.02%	15,515	31.22%	66.39%	12,323	4,884	2,723	27,838	1,925	–	–	49,693
QC	Saint-Jean	BQ	BQ	28,070	53.98%	16,554	31.83%	66.18%	11,516	6,426	3,622	28,070	2,371	–	–	52,005
QC	Saint-Lambert	BQ	BQ	20,949	45.30%	10,172	22.00%	62.31%	9,097	10,777	3,404	20,949	1,819	–	196	46,242
QC	Saint-Laurent—Cartierville	Lib	Lib	25,412	59.85%	19,220	45.27%	55.32%	5,590	25,412	3,279	6,192	1,810	–	177	42,460
QC	Saint-Léonard—Saint-Michel	Lib	Lib	23,705	57.17%	15,933	38.43%	57.00%	5,975	23,705	2,831	7,772	961	–	219	41,463
QC	Saint-Maurice—Champlain	BQ	BQ	21,532	44.34%	5,504	11.33%	61.95%	16,028	5,612	3,684	21,532	1,705	–	–	48,561
QC	Shefford	BQ	BQ	22,159	43.09%	9,425	18.33%	66.75%	12,734	12,043	2,431	22,159	2,061	–	–	51,428
QC	Sherbrooke	BQ	BQ	27,112	52.20%	16,349	31.48%	64.14%	10,763	6,863	4,646	27,112	2,238	315	–	51,937
QC	Terrebonne—Blainville	BQ	BQ	30,197	59.17%	19,985	39.16%	66.59%	10,212	4,576	3,829	30,197	2,216	–	–	51,030
QC	Trois-Rivières	BQ	BQ	22,331	45.87%	6,908	14.19%	64.14%	15,423	5,268	3,774	22,331	1,513	–	371	48,680
QC	Vaudreuil-Soulanges	BQ	BQ	26,925	43.08%	9,151	14.64%	70.74%	11,888	17,774	3,468	26,925	2,450	–	–	62,505
QC	Verchères—Les Patriotes	BQ	BQ	30,250	57.43%	18,771	35.64%	72.13%	11,479	4,602	4,293	30,250	2,047	–	–	52,671
QC	Westmount—Ville-Marie	Lib	Lib	18,884	45.68%	11,589	28.03%	53.69%	7,295	18,884	6,356	5,191	3,451	–	163	41,340
SK	Battlefords—Lloydminster	Con	Con	16,491	53.96%	11,662	38.16%	60.33%	16,491	3,901	4,829	–	637	4,396	306	30,560
SK	Blackstrap	Con	Con	19,430	47.99%	7,054	17.42%	68.94%	19,430	6,841	12,376	–	1,334	412	94	40,487
SK	Cypress Hills—Grasslands	Con	Con	20,035	66.48%	14,959	49.64%	66.53%	20,035	3,885	5,076	–	1,141	–	–	30,137
SK	Desnethé—Missinippi—Churchill River	Con	Lib	10,191	41.37%	67	0.27%	58.43%	10,124	10,191	3,787	–	534	–	–	24,636
SK	Palliser	Con	Con	14,906	42.99%	3,446	9.94%	68.69%	14,906	7,006	11,460	–	1,182	–	121	34,675
SK	Prince Albert	Con	Con	17,271	54.44%	9,709	30.60%	61.09%	17,271	6,149	7,562	–	744	–	–	31,726
SK	Regina—Lumsden—Lake Centre	Con	Con	14,176	42.15%	4,709	14.00%	68.45%	14,176	8,956	9,467	–	1,035	–	–	33,634
SK	Regina—Qu'Appelle	Con	Con	12,753	41.21%	2,712	8.76%	63.72%	12,753	7,134	10,041	–	1,016	–	–	30,944
SK	Saskatoon—Humboldt	Con	Con	18,285	49.07%	7,310	19.62%	67.27%	18,285	6,281	10,975	–	1,382	342	–	37,265
SK	Saskatoon—Rosetown—Biggar	Con	Con	13,331	45.54%	1,919	6.56%	59.72%	13,331	3,536	11,412	–	738	–	258	29,275
SK	Saskatoon—Wanuskewin	Con	Con	17,753	49.39%	9,098	25.31%	66.31%	17,753	8,655	7,939	–	1,292	–	307	35,946
SK	Souris—Moose Mountain	Con	Con	19,282	62.82%	13,601	44.31%	65.28%	19,282	5,681	4,284	–	1,448	–	–	30,695
SK	Wascana	Lib	Lib	20,666	51.78%	8,676	21.74%	69.85%	11,990	20,666	5,880	–	1,378	–	–	39,914
SK	Yorkton—Melville	Con	Con	20,736	63.47%	14,571	44.60%	64.32%	20,736	4,558	6,165	–	923	287	–	32,669
Terr	Nunavut	Lib	Lib	3,673	39.98%	1,003	10.92%	54.14%	2,670	3,673	1,576	–	544	–	724	9,187
Terr	Western Arctic	Lib	NDP	6,802	42.16%	1,159	7.18%	56.22%	3,200	5,643	6,802	–	338	149	–	16,132
Terr	Yukon	Lib	Lib	6,847	48.52%	3,481	24.67%	66.10%	3,341	6,847	3,366	–	559	–	–	14,113

= went to a judicial recount
= Open seat
= turnout is above national average
= Incumbent had switched allegiance
= Previously incumbent in another riding
= Not incumbent; was previously elected to the House
= Incumbency arose from by-election gain
= other incumbents defeated
= changed allegiance immediately after election
= Multiple candidates

=== Summary analysis ===
Ternary plots - shift of electoral support (2004-2006)
2004

2006
Electoral districts identified by colours of winning parties

Party candidates in 2nd place
Party in 1st place	Party in 2nd place						Total
Party in 1st place	Con	Lib	NDP	BQ	Grn	Ind	Total
Conservative		79	33	10	1	1	124
Liberal	75		19	9			103
New Democratic	6	23					29
Bloc Québécois	36	14	1				51
Independent				1			1
Total	117	116	53	20	1	1	308

Candidates ranked 1st to 5th place, by party
Parties	1st	2nd	3rd	4th	5th
█ Conservative	124	117	63	3	1
█ Liberal	103	116	84	5	
█ Bloc Québécois	51	20	1	3	
█ New Democratic	29	53	156	68	2
█ Independent	1	1	2	4	44
█ Green		1	2	221	79
█ Christian Heritage				2	33
█ Progressive Canadian				1	19
█ Marijuana				1	11
█ Marxist–Leninist					13
█ Canadian Action					12
█ Communist					9
█ Libertarian					5
█ First Peoples National					3
█ Western Block					3

Resulting composition of the 40th Canadian Parliament
Source		Party					
Source		Con	Lib	NDP	Bloc	Ind	Total
Seats retained	Incumbents returned	86	96	17	41	1	241
Seats retained	Open seats held	6	3	1	4		14
Seats changing hands	Incumbents defeated	23	1	6	6		36
Seats changing hands	Open seats gained	9	2	5			16
Seats changing hands	Incumbent changing allegiance		1				1
Total		124	103	29	51	1	308

=== Results by province ===
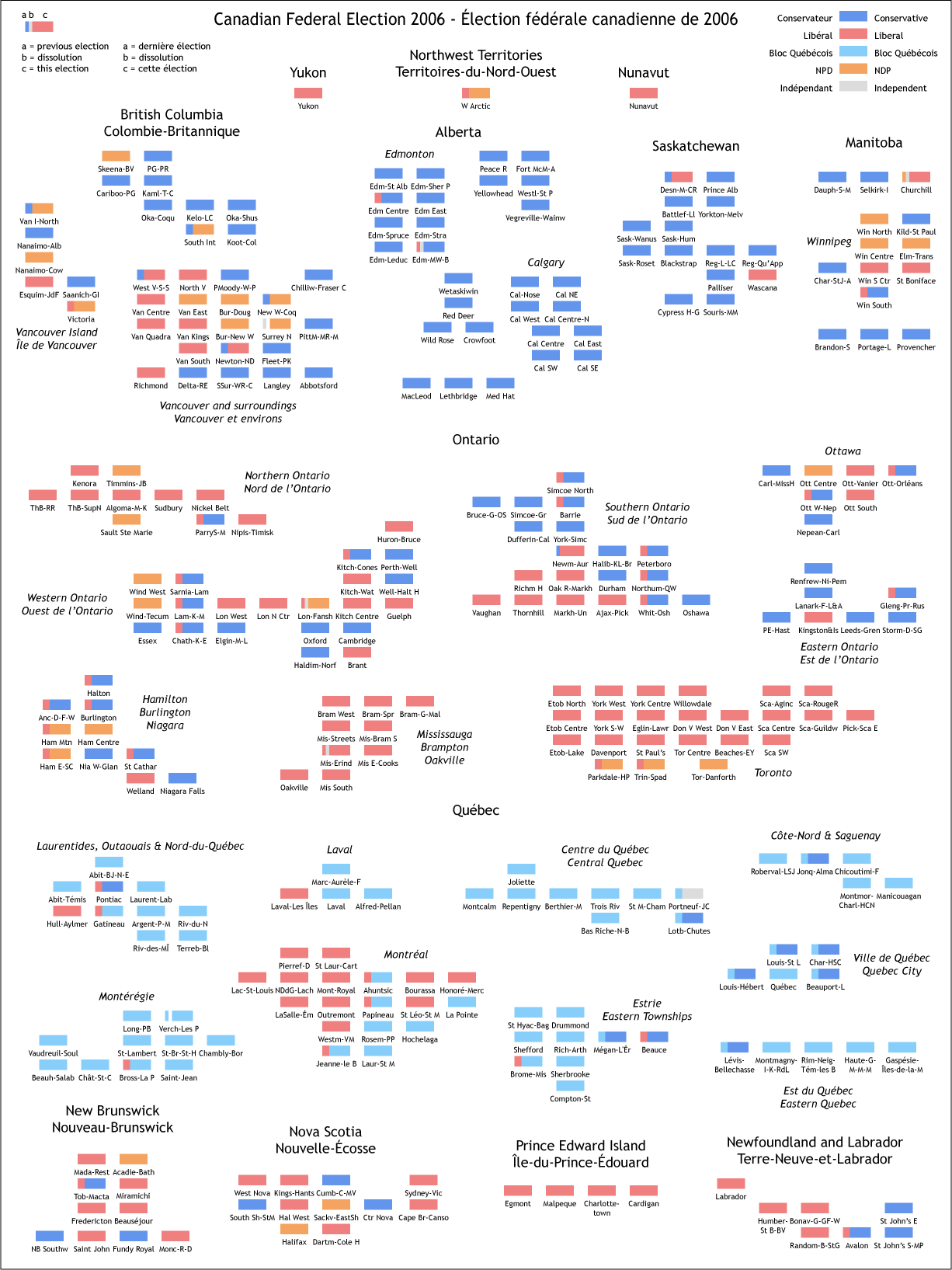

Party name		BC	AB	SK	MB	ON	QC	NB	NS	PE	NL	NU	NT	YT	Total
Conservative	Seats:	17	28	12	8	40	10	3	3	-	3	-	-	-	124
Conservative	Vote:	37.3	65.0	48.9	42.8	35.1	24.6	35.7	29.7	33.4	42.7	29.6	19.8	23.7	36.2
Liberal	Seats:	9	-	2	3	54	13	6	6	4	4	1	-	1	103
Liberal	Vote:	27.6	15.3	22.4	26.0	39.9	20.7	39.2	37.1	52.5	42.8	39.1	34.9	48.5	30.2
Bloc Québécois	Seats:						51								51
Bloc Québécois	Vote:						42.1								10.5
New Democrat	Seats:	10	-	-	3	12	-	1	2	-	-	-	1	-	29
New Democrat	Vote:	28.6	11.6	24.0	25.4	19.4	7.5	21.9	29.8	9.6	13.6	17.6	42.1	23.8	17.5
Green	Vote:	5.3	6.5	3.2	3.9	4.7	4.0	2.4	2.6	3.9	0.9	5.9	2.1	4.0	4.5
Independent / No affiliation	Seats:						1								1
Independent / No affiliation	Vote:						0.9								0.1
Total seats:		36	28	14	14	106	75	10	11	4	7	1	1	1	308

=== Notes ===
David Emerson, elected on January 23 as a Liberal in the British Columbia riding of Vancouver Kingsway, changed parties on February 6 to join the Conservatives before the new Parliament had taken office. He is reflected here as a Liberal.

André Arthur was elected as an independent candidate in the Quebec riding of Portneuf—Jacques-Cartier.

=== 10 closest ridings ===
1. Parry Sound-Muskoka, ON: Tony Clement (Cons) def. Andy Mitchell (Lib) by 28 votes
2. Desnethé—Missinippi—Churchill River, SK: Gary Merasty (Lib) def. Jeremy Harrison (Cons) by 73 votes
3. Winnipeg South, MB: Rod Bruinooge (Cons) def. Reg Alcock (Lib) by 111 votes
4. Glengarry—Prescott—Russell, ON: Pierre Lemieux (Cons) def. René Berthiaume (Lib) by 203 votes
5. Louis-Hébert, QC: Luc Harvey (Cons) def. Roger Clavet (BQ) by 231 votes
6. St. Catharines, ON: Rick Dykstra (Cons) def. Walt Lastewka (Lib) by 244 votes
7. Tobique—Mactaquac, NB: Mike Allen (Cons) def. Andy Savoy (Lib) by 336 votes
8. Thunder Bay—Superior North, ON: Joe Comuzzi (Lib) def. Bruce Hyer (NDP) by 408 votes
9. West Nova, NS: Robert Thibault (Lib) def. Greg Kerr (Cons) by 511 votes
10. Brant, ON: Lloyd St. Amand (Lib) def. Phil McColeman (Cons) by 582 votes

=== Results by region ===
- Results of the 2006 Canadian federal election by riding
- Western Canada and Territories
- Ontario
- Quebec and Atlantic Canada

== See also ==
Articles on parties' candidates in this election:

- Independents
- Canadian Action
- Communists
- Progressive Canadian Party
- List of Canadian political scandals
- Libertarians
- Marijuana Party
- Bloc Québécois
- Conservatives
- Green Party
- New Democrats
- Christian Heritage
- In and Out scandal
