= Libertarian Party of Canada candidates in the 2006 Canadian federal election =

The Libertarian Party of Canada fielded eleven candidates in the 2006 federal election, none of whom were elected. Information about these candidates may be found here.

== Ontario ==
=== Soumen Deb (Don Valley West) ===
Deb was born in Toronto in 1976 and attended Don Valley Collegiate and Queen's University. He was the Libertarian Party's candidate in Don Valley West in the 2006 federal election and is standing for the party again in the September 22, 2008, federal by-election.

He is a logistics coordinator, and an advocate of personal, economic and commercial freedom. In the 2006 campaign, he wrote that he supports preserving the environment through "market forces and grassroots action".

He campaigned for Mayor of Toronto in the 2006 municipal election, saying that he would "raise awareness for the state of individual freedom and liberty" and "expose government in its current format as bad for this society".

Electoral record
Election	Division	Party	Votes	%	Place	Winner
2006 federal	Don Valley West	Libertarian	226		5/6	John Godfrey, Liberal
2006 municipal	Mayor of Toronto	n/a	517	0.1	34/38	David Miller

=== Marty Gobin (Whitby—Oshawa) ===
Gobin received 274 votes (0.4%), finishing fifth against Conservative candidate Jim Flaherty.
