= Mission—Matsqui—Abbotsford =

Federal electoral district in British Columbia, Canada

British Columbia electoral district
- Interactive map of riding boundaries from the 2025 federal election. Points indicate the cities of Abbotsford and Mission.

Federal electoral district
- Legislature: House of Commons
MP
Brad Vis
Conservative
- District created: 2013
- First contested: 2015
- Last contested: 2025
- District webpage: profile, map

Demographics
- Population (2011): 90,871
- Electors (2019): 69,190
- Area (km²): 21,769
- Pop. density (per km²): 4.2
- Census division(s): Fraser Valley, Squamish-Lillooet
- Census subdivision(s): Abbotsford (part), Mission (part), Kent (part), Harrison Hot Springs, Chehalis, Holachten, Upper Sumas, Skweahm, Lakahahmen, Squawkum Creek

Mission—Matsqui—Abbotsford (formerly Mission—Matsqui—Fraser Canyon) is a federal electoral district located in Fraser Valley of British Columbia.

Mission—Matsqui—Fraser Canyon was created by the 2012 federal electoral boundaries redistribution and was legally defined in the 2013 representation order. It came into effect upon the call of the 42nd Canadian federal election, which occurred on October 19, 2015. It was created out of the electoral districts of Pitt Meadows—Maple Ridge—Mission, Abbotsford and Chilliwack—Fraser Canyon.

Under the 2022 Canadian federal electoral redistribution the riding was renamed.

== Demographics ==
Panethnic groups in Mission—Matsqui—Fraser Canyon (2011−2021)
Panethnic group	2021		2016		2011	
Panethnic group	Pop.	%	Pop.	%	Pop.	%
European (Note: Statistic includes all persons that did not make up part of a visible minority or an indigenous identity.)	58,855	59.32%	58,205	63.08%	58,880	66.28%
South Asian	22,795	22.98%	19,115	20.72%	16,890	19.01%
Indigenous	11,225	11.31%	10,650	11.54%	9,610	10.82%
Southeast Asian (Note: Statistic includes total responses of "Filipino" and "Southeast Asian" under visible minority section on census.)	2,105	2.12%	1,150	1.25%	665	0.75%
East Asian (Note: Statistic includes total responses of "Chinese", "Korean", and "Japanese" under visible minority section on census.)	1,785	1.8%	1,495	1.62%	1,295	1.46%
Latin American	695	0.7%	580	0.63%	365	0.41%
African	745	0.75%	515	0.56%	645	0.73%
Middle Eastern (Note: Statistic includes total responses of "West Asian" and "Arab" under visible minority section on census.)	380	0.38%	140	0.15%	165	0.19%
Other (Note: Statistic includes total responses of "Visible minority, n.i.e." and "Multiple visible minorities" under visible minority section on census.)	630	0.63%	405	0.44%	305	0.34%
Total responses	99,215	98.02%	92,265	97.3%	88,840	98.04%
Total population	101,216	100%	94,825	100%	90,616	100%
Notes: Totals greater than 100% due to multiple origin responses. Demographics based on 2012 Canadian federal electoral redistribution riding boundaries.

== Members of Parliament ==
This riding has elected the following members of the House of Commons of Canada:

Parliament	Years	Member	Party
Mission—Matsqui—Fraser Canyon; Riding created from Abbotsford, Chilliwack—Fraser Canyon and Pitt Meadows—Maple Ridge—Mission
42nd	2015–2019	Jati Sidhu	Liberal
43rd	2019–2021	Brad Vis	Conservative
44th	2021–2025	Brad Vis	Conservative
Mission—Matsqui—Abbotsford
45th	2025–present	Brad Vis	Conservative

== Election results ==
View source data.
Graph of election results in Mission—Matsqui—Fraser Canyon (minor parties that never got 2% of the vote or didn't run consistently are omitted)

=== Mission—Matsqui—Abbotsford, 2023 representation order ===
2025 Canadian federal election
Party	Candidate	Votes	%	±%	Expenditures
Conservative	Brad Vis	33,791	56.70	+9.58	$111,101.54
Liberal	Jeff Howe	21,838	36.64	+12.42	$38,999.20
New Democratic	Jules Côté	2,745	4.61	–13.38	$5,340.20
Green	John Kidder	723	1.21	–2.50	none listed
People's	Kevin Sinclair	502	0.84	–6.13	$5,200.00
Total valid votes/expense limit		59,599	99.42	–	$130,464.32
Total rejected ballots		346	0.58	–0.12	
Turnout		59,945	70.25	+9.08	
Eligible voters		85,337			
Conservative hold		Swing		–1.42	
Source: Elections Canada

2021 federal election redistributed results
Party	Vote	%
Conservative	24,310	47.12
Liberal	12,493	24.22
New Democratic	9,279	17.99
People's	3,594	6.97
Green	1,915	3.71

=== Mission—Matsqui—Fraser Canyon, 2013 representation order ===
2021 Canadian federal election: Mission—Matsqui—Fraser Canyon
Party	Candidate	Votes	%	±%	Expenditures
Conservative	Brad Vis	18,908	43.79	+1.39	$105,614.90
Liberal	Geet Grewal	10,598	24.55	–2.15	$93,378.54
New Democratic	Lynn Perrin	8,709	20.17	+2.61	$11,489.62
People's	Tyler Niles	3,073	7.12	+4.83	$9,144.65
Green	Nicole Bellay	1,887	4.37	–6.52	$11,177.38
Total valid votes/expense limit		43,175	99.31	–	$116,997.79
Total rejected ballots		302	0.69	–0.25	
Turnout		43,477	61.17	–5.30	
Eligible voters		71,078			
Conservative hold		Swing		+1.77	
Source: Elections Canada

2019 Canadian federal election: Mission—Matsqui—Fraser Canyon
Party	Candidate	Votes	%	±%	Expenditures
Conservative	Brad Vis	19,535	42.41	+7.50	$77,546.99
Liberal	Jati Sidhu	12,299	26.70	–10.53	$110,453.00
New Democratic	Michael Nenn	8,089	17.56	–2.99	$2,936.51
Green	John Kidder	5,019	10.90	+5.76	$22,090.21
People's	Julius Nick Csaszar	1,055	2.29	–	$5,447.11
Marxist–Leninist	Elaine Wismer	69	0.15	+0.02	none listed
Total valid votes/expense limit		46,066	99.06	–	$112,972.00
Total rejected ballots		439	0.94	+0.48	
Turnout		46,505	66.46	–3.91	
Eligible voters		69,970			
Conservative gain from Liberal		Swing		+9.02	
Source: Elections Canada

2015 Canadian federal election: Mission—Matsqui—Fraser Canyon
Party	Candidate	Votes	%	±%	Expenditures
Liberal	Jati Sidhu	16,625	37.23	+28.84	$101,945.63
Conservative	Brad Vis	15,587	34.91	–19.58	$97,837.00
New Democratic	Dennis Adamson	9,174	20.55	–11.48	$7,404.09
Green	Arthur Alexander Green	2,293	5.14	+0.50	$13,329.06
Independent	Wyatt Scott	914	2.05	–	none listed
Marxist–Leninist	Elaine Wismer	58	0.13	–	none listed
Total valid votes/expense limit		44,651	99.53	–	$217,198.40
Total rejected ballots		209	0.47	–	
Turnout		44,860	70.38	–	
Eligible voters		63,744			
Liberal notional gain from Conservative		Swing		+24.21	
Source: Elections Canada

2011 federal election redistributed results
Party	Vote	%
Conservative	18,328	54.49
New Democratic	10,771	32.02
Liberal	2,824	8.40
Green	1,560	4.64
Others	152	0.45

== See also ==
- List of Canadian electoral districts
- Historical federal electoral districts of Canada
