= Jati Sidhu =

Canadian politician (born 1952)

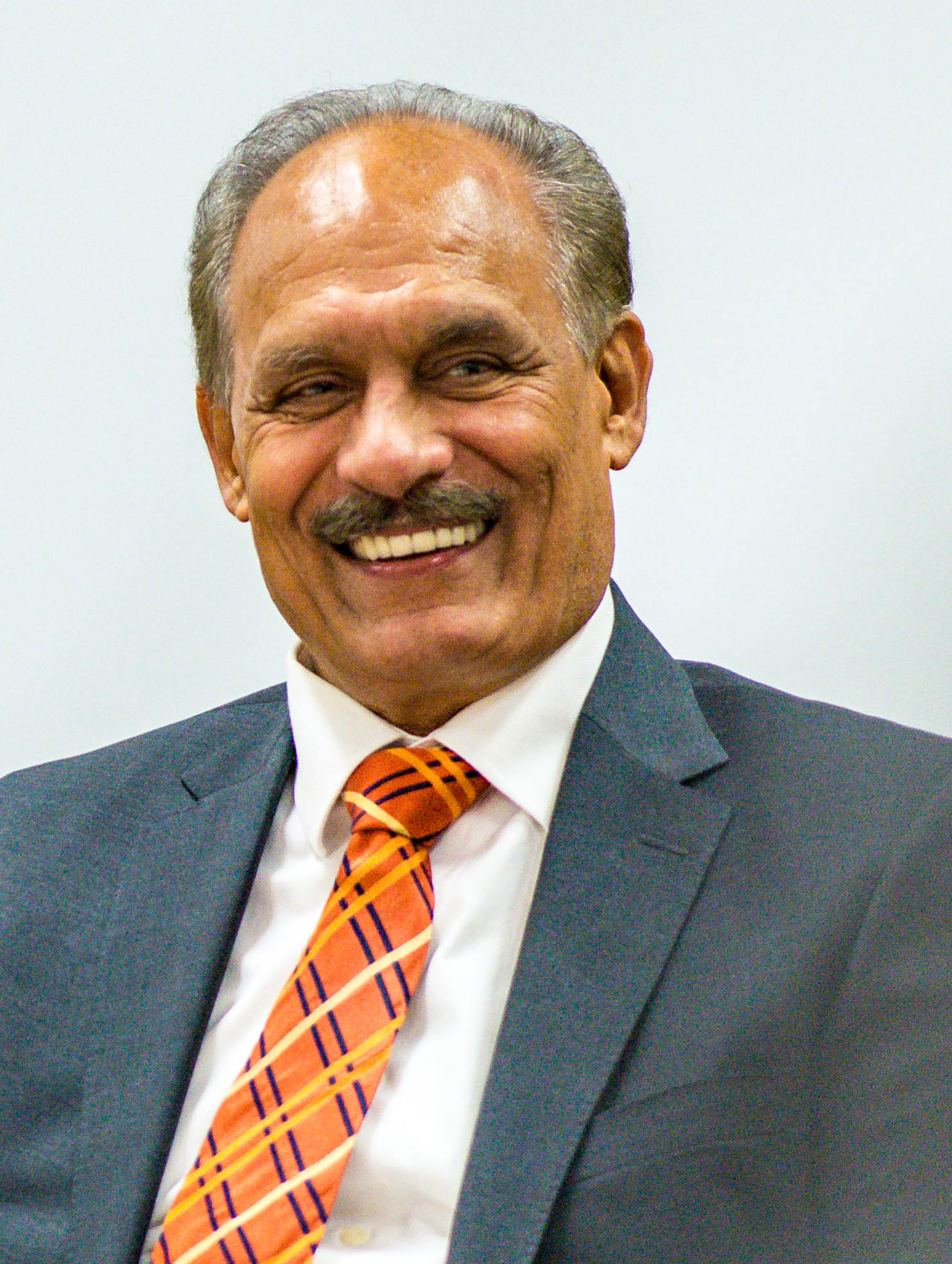
- Sidhu at UFV in 2017

Member of Parliament for Mission—Matsqui—Fraser Canyon
- In office October 19, 2015 – October 21, 2019
- Preceded by: Riding Established
- Succeeded by: Brad Vis

Personal details
- Born: 1952 (age 73–74)
- Party: Liberal
- Profession: farmer, businessman
- Website: https://jatisidhu.ca

Jatinder Sidhu (born 1952) is a Canadian politician, who represented the riding of Mission—Matsqui—Fraser Canyon in the House of Commons of Canada from 2015 until his defeat in the 2019 Canadian federal election.

Previously an entrepreneur, Sidhu entered politics after many years of community activism and volunteer service.

== Electoral record ==
2019 Canadian federal election: Mission—Matsqui—Fraser Canyon
Party	Candidate	Votes	%	±%	Expenditures
Conservative	Brad Vis	19,535	42.4	+7.49	$79,505.40
Liberal	Jati Sidhu	12,299	26.7	-10.53	$106,930.28
New Democratic	Michael Nenn	8,089	17.6	-2.95	$2,936.51
Green	John Kidder	5,019	10.9	+5.75	$22,090.21
People's	Julius Nick Csaszar	1,055	2.3	-	none listed
Marxist–Leninist	Elaine Wismer	69	0.1	-0.03	$0.00
Total valid votes/expense limit		46,066	100.0		
Total rejected ballots		439			
Turnout		46,505	67.2		
Eligible voters		69,190			
Conservative gain from Liberal		Swing		+9.01	
Source: Elections Canada

2015 Canadian federal election: Mission—Matsqui—Fraser Canyon
Party	Candidate	Votes	%	±%	Expenditures
Liberal	Jati Sidhu	16,625	37.23	+28.84	$101,945.63
Conservative	Brad Vis	15,587	34.91	-19.58	$97,837.00
New Democratic	Dennis Adamson	9,174	20.55	-11.48	–
Green	Arthur Alexander Green	2,293	5.15	+0.50	$13,329.06
Independent	Wyatt Scott	914	2.05	–	–
Marxist–Leninist	Elaine Wismer	58	0.13	–	–
Total valid votes/expense limit		44,651	100.00		$217,198.40
Total rejected ballots		209	0.47	–	
Turnout		44,860	71.79	–	
Eligible voters		62,486			
Liberal gain from Conservative		Swing		+24.21	
Source: Elections Canada

2000 Canadian federal election: Dewdney-Alouette
Party	Candidate	Votes	%	±%	Expenditures
Alliance	Grant McNally	28,181	58.42	+11.17	$32,313
Liberal	Jati Sidhu	8,717	18.07	–7.03	$37,270
Progressive Conservative	Gord Kehler	5,804	12.03	+5.98	$8,033
New Democratic	Malcolm James Crockett	5,535	11.47	–7.70	$15,196
Total valid votes		48,237	100.00		
Total rejected ballots		210	0.43	+0.13	
Turnout		48,447	63.38	+0.37	
Alliance hold		Swing		+9.10	
Change for the Canadian Alliance is based on the Reform Party.
