= Communist Party of Canada candidates in the 2006 Canadian federal election =

The Communist Party of Canada ran several candidates in the 2006 federal election, none of whom were elected.

== Manitoba ==
=== Lisa Gallagher (Brandon—Souris) ===
Gallagher received 120 votes (0.32%), finishing seventh against Conservative incumbent Merv Tweed.

== Ontario ==
=== Upali Jinadasa Wannaku Rallage (Brampton—Springdale) ===
Wannaku Rallage was born and raised in Sri Lanka, and later moved to Italy before coming to the Greater Toronto Area. He is a trade unionist in the service transportation industry, and a member of the Canada-Sri Lanka Patriotic National Organization. He received 110 votes (0.23%), finishing fifth against Liberal incumbent Ruby Dhalla.

=== Sam Hammond (Sudbury) ===
Hammond received 70 votes (0.15%), finishing seventh against Liberal incumbent Diane Marleau.

== Quebec ==
=== Evelyn Elizabeth Ruiz (Laurier—Sainte-Marie) ===
Evelyn Ruiz is active in Montreal's Latin American community. Ruiz received 100 votes (0.2%) finishing ninth against incumbent and Bloc Québécois leader Gilles Duceppe.

=== Bill Sloan (Westmount—Ville-Marie) ===
Bill Sloan is a lawyer who specializes in the rights of political refugees. Sloan received 69 votes (0.2%) to finish seventh against the Liberal Party of Canada incumbent, Lucienne Robillard.
