= Bloc Québécois candidates in the 2006 Canadian federal election =

In the 2006 Canadian federal election, the Bloc Québécois ran candidates in all 75 ridings of the province of Quebec.

== Candidates ==
=== Alain Charette ===
A professional pilot and a teacher, he also ran as the Bloc Québécois candidate for Hull—Aylmer in the 2004 election, where he finished second, 9% behind Liberal incumbent Marcel Proulx. In 2006 he ran in the district once again and lost to Proulx for a second time, albeit only by 3.6% of the vote. Proulx saw a greater loss in votes compared to 2004 than Charette, most of which were gained by the Conservatives and New Democrats. Hull-Aylmer is one of the most federalist ridings in Quebec.

Alain Charette is a founding member of "Le Québec, Un Pays", a Quebec separatist group, currently led by Edith Gendron, the wife of Gatineau MP Richard Nadeau.
