= Christian Heritage Party of Canada candidates in the 1988 Canadian federal election =

List of candidates

The Christian Heritage Party of Canada (French: Parti de L'Héritage Chrétien du Canada) fielded 63 candidates in the 1988 federal election in Canada. This was the first time the party contested an election on the federal level, and the party faced potential rivalry from the Reform Party of Canada in the four western provinces, where it also was contesting its first election.

- Simone Middelkoop, Athabasca, AB
- Ron Romanow, Edmonton East, AB
- John Werkman, Edmonton North, AB
- Charles Cavilla, Lethbridge, AB
- Hans Visser, Medicine Hat, AB
- Jim Swan, Red Deer, AB
- Dwayne O'Coin, St. Albert, AB
- David J. Reimer, Wetaskiwin, AB
- John Torringa, Yellowhead, AB
- Ivan Zalinko, Comox-Alberni, BC
- Keith Gee, Delta, BC (also ran in 1993)
- Ron Gray, Fraser Valley East, BC
- Edward Vanwoudenberg, Fraser Valley West, BC
- Gerald Brinders, Kootenay East, BC (also ran in 1993)
- Donna Pickering, Mission-Coquitlam, BC
- John Krell, North Island—Powell River, BC (also ran in 1997, 2000)
- Bert Prins, Prince George-Bulkley Valley, BC (also ran in 1993)
- Brian Wilson, Richmond, BC
- Tom Brophy, Skeena, BC
- Bill Stilwell, Surrey North, BC (also ran in 1993, 1997)
- Roy Pilkey, Surrey-White Rock, BC
- Abe Neufeld, Brandon-Souris, MB (also ran in 1993)
- Don Esler, Lisgar—Marquette, MB
- Karl Felsen, Selkirk, MB
- David Little, Moncton, NB
- Robert Tremblett, St. John's East, NF (also ran in 1993)
- Jack Enserink, Annapolis Valley—Hants, NS (also ran in 1993)
- Norm Pearce, Cumberland-Colchester, NS
- Angus McLean, South West Nova, NS
- Don Eddie, Brampton, ON
- Geraldine DeVries, Brant, ON
- Ron Bremer, Burlington, ON
- Rien Vandenenden, Cambridge, ON
- Terese Ferri, Carleton-Gloucester, ON
- John Kuipers, Durham, ON
- Will Wymenga, Elgin, ON
- Cope Gritter, Erie, ON
- William Ubbens, Etobicoke North, ON (also ran in 1990 byelection, 2004)
- Peter J. Ellis, Guelph-Wellington, ON (multiple elections)
- Garry Sytsma, Haldimand-Norfolk, ON
- Charles Eleveld, Hamilton—Mountain, ON
- Barrie Mombourquette, Hamilton West, ON
- Ray Pennings, Hamilton-Wentworth, ON
- Richard Welsman, Hastings-Frontenac-Lennox and Addington, ON
- Tom Clark, Huron-Bruce, ON
- Ed Carlson, Kenora-Rainy River, ON
- Allan James, Kent, ON (also ran in 2002 byelection, 2004)
- Terry M. Marshall, Kingston and the Islands, ON
- John Koster, Lambton—Middlesex, ON
- David J. Butcher, Leeds-Grenville, ON
- Peggy Humby, Lincoln, ON
- Bill Andres, Niagara Falls, ON
- John Meiboom, Northumberland, ON
- Paul Callaway, Oakville—Milton, ON
- Hans Strikwerda, Oxford, ON (also ran in 1993)
- Stan Puklicz, Perth—Wellington—Waterloo, ON
- John Herring, Prince Edward-Hastings, ON
- Ethel Snow, Simcoe Centre, ON
- Bert Nieuwenhuis, Wellington—Grey—Dufferin—Simcoe, ON
- Klaas Stel, York-Simcoe, ON
- Baird Judson, Hillsborough, PE
- Robert Adams, Notre-Dame-de-Grace, QC (also ran in 1993)
- Jacob de Raadt, Yukon, YT

== Byelection candidates, 1988–1993 ==
- Gerry Van Schepen (Oshawa, ON) Aug 13, 1990
- William Ubbens (York North, ON) Dec 10, 1990
- Mae Boudreau-Pedersen (Beausejour, NB) Dec 10, 1990
