= Christian Heritage Party of Canada candidates in the 2015 Canadian federal election =

This is a list of the candidates that ran for the Christian Heritage Party of Canada in the 42nd Canadian federal election.

== Alberta ==
Riding	Candidate's Name	Notes	Gender	Residence	Occupation	Votes	%	Rank
Bow River	Frans VandeStroet		Male	Iron Springs		280	0.56	6/7
Calgary Signal Hill	Jesse Rau		Male	Calgary		160	0.26	6/6
Edmonton Mill Woods	Peter Downing		Male	Edmonton		285	0.58	7/8
Foothills	Marc Slingerland		Male			345	0.57	6/6
Fort McMurray—Cold Lake	Roelof Janssen		Male		Publisher	280	0.59	6/6
Lethbridge	Geoffrey Capp		Male	Lethbridge	Office manager	746	1.31	5/6
Sturgeon River—Parkland	Ernest Chauvet		Male			690	1.12	5/5

== British Columbia ==
Riding	Candidate's Name	Notes	Gender	Residence	Occupation	Votes	%	Rank
Cariboo—Prince George	Adam De Kroon		Male			280	0.59	7/7
Skeena—Bulkley Valley	Donald Spratt		Male		Pastor	780	1.77	5/5
Surrey Centre	Kevin Pielak		Male	Surrey		553	1.28	5/6

== Manitoba ==
Riding	Candidate's Name	Notes	Gender	Residence	Occupation	Votes	%	Rank
Kildonan—St. Paul	David J. Reimer		Male			485	1.11	5/6
Portage—Lisgar	Jerome Dondo		Male		Accountant	1,315	3.19	5/5
Winnipeg Centre	Scott Miller		Male	Winnipeg	Pastor	221	0.65	5/6

== Ontario ==
Riding	Candidate's Name	Notes	Gender	Residence	Occupation	Votes	%	Rank
Barrie—Innisfil	Gary Nail		Male			199	0.40	5/6
Durham	Andrew Moriarity		Male			364	0.57	5/5
Elgin—Middlesex—London	Michael Hopkins		Male		General machinist	529	0.93	5/6
Haldimand—Norfolk	Dave Bylsma		Male			884	1.58	5/7
Hamilton Mountain	Jim Enos		Male			438	0.87	6/6
Mississauga—Streetsville	Yegor Tarazevich		Male	Mississauga	Computer programmer	253	0.45	5/5
Niagara West	Harold Jonker		Male	St Anns	Business manager	1,234	2.44	5/6
Ottawa West—Nepean	Rod Taylor		Male		CHP leader	740	1.17	5/6
Oxford	Melody Aldred		Female		Art teacher	1,175	2.10	5/5
Perth Wellington	Irma DeVries		Female			794	1.50	5/6
Scarborough—Agincourt	Jude Coutinho		Male			334	0.80	5/5
Simcoe—Grey	Len Noordegraaf		Male			528	0.80	5/5
Simcoe North	Scott Whittaker		Male	Orillia	Financial advisor	319	0.56	6/6

== Prince Edward Island ==
Riding	Candidate's Name	Notes	Gender	Residence	Occupation	Votes	%	Rank
Cardigan	Christene Squires		Female			295	1.31	5/5

== Quebec ==
Riding	Candidate's Name	Notes	Gender	Residence	Occupation	Votes	%	Rank
Hull—Aylmer	Sean J. Mulligan		Male			291	0.52	6/8
Louis-Hébert	Stefan Jetchick		Male	Quebec City	Interpreter	128	0.21	6/6
Vimy	Brian Jenkins		Male			260	0.48	6/6

== See also ==
- Results of the Canadian federal election, 2015
- Christian Heritage Party of Canada candidates, 2011 Canadian federal election
