= Christian Heritage Party of Canada candidates in the 2008 Canadian federal election =

This is a list of the 59 candidates who ran for the Christian Heritage Party of Canada in the 40th Canadian federal election.

== Alberta - 28 seats ==
| Riding | Candidate's Name | Notes | Gender | Residence | Occupation | Votes | % | Rank |
|---|---|---|---|---|---|---|---|---|
| Calgary Southwest | Larry Heather | 1993, 1997, 2004, and 2006 candidate in this riding | M | Calgary | Audio Producer | 256 | 0.5% | 6th |
| Fort McMurray—Athabasca | Jacob Strydhorst | 2000 and 2004 candidate in this riding | M | Neerlandia | Farmer | 186 | 0.7% | 7th |
| Lethbridge | Geoffrey Capp | 1993, 1997, 2000 and 2004 candidate in Yukon | M | Lethbridge | Security Guard | 1,094 | 2.3% | 5th |
| Macleod | Marc Slingerland | 2006 candidate in Lethbridge | M | Lethbridge | Teacher | 422 | 0.9% | 5th |
| Medicine Hat | Frans VandeStroet | | M | Enchant | Farm Realtor | 363 | 1.0% | 7th |
| Westlock—St. Paul | Sippe Hofstede | | M | Westlock | Draftsman | 510 | 1.4% | 5th |
| Yellowhead | John Marvin Wierenga | 2006 candidate in this riding | M | Neerlandia | Welder | 606 | 1.6 | 5th |

== British Columbia - 36 seats ==
| Riding | Candidate's Name | Notes | Gender | Residence | Occupation | Votes | % | Rank |
|---|---|---|---|---|---|---|---|---|
| Chilliwack—Fraser Canyon | Harold J. Ludwig | 1997, 2000 and 2004 candidate in this riding | M | Abbotsford | Retired | 653 | 1.4% | 5th |
| Langley | Ron Gray | Former Party Leader | M | Langely | Political Party Leader | 594 | 1.1% | 5th |
| Nanaimo—Alberni | Frank Wagner | 2000, 2004, and 2006 candidate in this riding | M | Nanaimo | Foster Father | 176 | 0.3% | 5th |
| Saanich—Gulf Islands | Dan Moreau | 2000 candidate in this riding | M | Sidney | Environmental Health Officer | 114 | 0.2% | 8th |
| Skeena—Bulkley Valley | Rod Taylor | 2004, and 2006 candidate in this riding | M | Smithers | Quality Control Supervisor | 1,125 | 3.3% | 5th |
| Surrey North | Kevin Pielak | 2006 candidate in this riding | M | Surrey | Teacher | 484 | 1.4% | 5th |
| Victoria | John Cooper | 2008 candidate in this riding | M | Victoria | Physician | 237 | 0.4 | 5th |

== Manitoba - 14 Seats ==
| Riding | Candidate's Name | Notes | Gender | Residence | Occupation | Votes | % | Rank |
|---|---|---|---|---|---|---|---|---|
| Brandon—Souris | Jerome Dondo | | M | Treherne | Accountant | 292 | 0.9% | 5th |
| Charleswood—St. James—Assiniboia | Mark Price | | M | Winnipeg | Residential Support Worker | 180 | 0.4% | 5th |
| Dauphin—Swan River—Marquette | David Andres | 2004 candidate in this riding | M | Ethelbert | Insurance Broker | 356 | 1.2% | 5th |
| Elmwood—Transcona | Robert Scott | 1993, 1997, 2000, 2004, and 2006 candidate in this riding | M | Winnipeg | Locomotive Engineer | 312 | 1.0% | 5th |
Notes:Robert Scott has a Bachelor of Arts degree (1973) and a certificate of education (1974) from the University of Manitoba. He worked as a teacher and social counsellor with the Department of Indian Affairs and later became a locomotive engineer with the Canadian National Railway. He is a retired member of the Royal Canadian Navy Reserves with a rank of Chief Petty Officer 2nd Class. Scott joined the Christian Heritage Party in 1988 and has been president of its Manitoba branch. Once active in the Roman Catholic church, he now attends the Shalom Family Worship Centre. He has been a CHP candidate in six elections. Electoral record: Election / Division / Party / Votes / % / Place / Winner; 1993 federal / Winnipeg—Transcona / Christian Heritage / 362 / 0.88 / 6/9 / Bill Blaikie, New Democratic Party; 1997 federal / Winnipeg—Transcona / Christian Heritage / 423 / 1.28 / 5/7 / Bill Blaikie, New Democratic Party; 2000 federal / Winnipeg—Transcona / N/A (Christian Heritage) / 146 / 0.45 / 6/8 / Bill Blaikie, New Democratic Party; 2004 federal / Elmwood—Transcona / Christian Heritage / 386 / 1.32 / 5/7 / Bill Blaikie, New Democratic Party; 2006 federal / Elmwood—Transcona / Christian Heritage / 363 / 1.09 / 5/5 / Bill Blaikie, New Democratic Party; 2008 federal / Elmwood—Transcona / Christian Heritage / 312 / 0.99 / 5/5 / Jim Maloway, New Democratic Party
| Kildonan—St. Paul | Jordan Loewen | | M | Winnipeg | Draftsman | 233 | 0.6% | 5th |
| Portage—Lisgar | Len Lodder | | M | Carman | Teacher | 911 | 2.8% | 5th |
| Provencher | David J. Reimer | 1988 candidate in Wetaskiwin, 1997 candidate in Winnipeg North—St. Paul, and 2004, and 2006 candidate in Portage—Lisgar | M | Steinbach | Clergyman | 1,170 | 3.2% | 5th |
| Saint Boniface | Justin Gregoire | | M | Winnipeg | District Manager | 195 | 0.5% | 5th |
| Selkirk—Interlake | Jane MacDiarmid | 2004 candidate in Winnipeg South, and 2006 candidate in Saint Boniface | F | Winnipeg | Teacher | 295 | 0.8% | 5th |
| Winnipeg South | Heidi Loewen-Steffano | 2006 candidate in this riding | F | Winnipeg | Homemaker | 173 | 0.4% | 5th |

== Nova Scotia - 11 seats ==
| Riding | Candidate's Name | Notes | Gender | Residence | Occupation | Votes | % | Rank |
|---|---|---|---|---|---|---|---|---|
| Central Nova | Michael Mackay | | M | West River Station | Retail | 427 | 1.1% | 4th |
| Dartmouth—Cole Harbour | George Campbell | | M | Dartmouth | Minister | 219 | 0.5% | 5th |
| Halifax West | Trevor Ennis | | M | Halifax | Swimming Pool Salesman | 257 | 0.6% | 5th |
| Kings—Hants | Jim Hnatiuk | Current Party Leader, 2004 candidate in this riding | M | Enfield | Combat Systems Technician | 528 | 1.4% | 5th |
| South Shore—St. Margaret's | Joe Larkin | | M | Shag Harbour | Retired | 513 | 1.3% | 5th |

== Ontario - 106 seats ==
| Riding | Candidate's Name | Notes | Gender | Residence | Occupation | Votes | % | Rank |
|---|---|---|---|---|---|---|---|---|
| Ajax—Pickering | Kevin P. Norng | 2006 candidate in this riding | M | Claremont | Contractor | 398 | 0.8% | 5th |
| Brant | John Geza Gots | 2000, and 2004 candidate in Cambridge | M | Port Dover | Retired | 371 | 0.7% | 5th |
| Bruce—Grey—Owen Sound | Joel Kidd | | M | Ravenna | Technologist | 599 | 1.2% | 5th |
| Don Valley East | Alexandre Kovalenko | | M | Toronto | Construction Worker | 266 | 0.7% | 5th |
| Durham | Henry Zekveld | 1993 candidate in Huron—Bruce, 2006 candidate in this riding | M | Bowmanville | Farmer | 577 | 1.1% | 5th |
| Elgin—Middlesex—London | Carl David Hiemstra | | M | Aylmer | Farmer | 619 | 1.3% | 5th |
| Haldimand—Norfolk | Steven Elgersma | 2004, and 2006 candidate in this riding | M | Dunnville | Retired | 501 | 1.0% | 6th |
| Haliburton—Kawartha Lakes—Brock | David Switzer | 1993 candidate in Prince Edward—Hastings | M | Haliburton | Retired | 374 | 0.7% | 5th |
| Halton | Tony Rodrigues | | M | Milton | Bus Driver | 337 | 0.5% | 5th |
| Huron—Bruce | Dave Joslin | 1997, 2000 2004, and 2006 candidate in this riding | M | Brussels | Welder | 747 | 1.5% | 5th |
| Lambton—Kent—Middlesex | Michael Janssens | 2006 candidate in this riding | M | Strathroy | Financial Advisor | 663 | 1.4% | 5th |
| London—Fanshawe | Leonard Vanderhoeven | | M | Woodstock | Engineer | 276 | 0.7% | 5th |
| London West | Leslie Bartley | 2004 candidate in this riding | F | Woodstock | Self-Employed | 253 | 0.4% | 6th |
| Newmarket—Aurora | Ray Luff | | M | Newmarket | Consultant | 205 | 0.4% | 6th |
| Niagara West—Glanbrook | David W. Bylsma | 1993 candidate in St. Catharines, 1997 candidate in Niagara Centre, 2004, candidate in Erie-Lincoln and 2004 and 2006 candidate in this riding | M | St. Anns | Cabinet-Maker | 1,118 | 2.1% | 5th |
| Oshawa | Peter Vogel | 2004 candidate in this riding | M | Orono | Student | 246 | 0.5% | 5th |
| Oxford | Shaun MacDonald | | M | Woodstock | Student | 1,036 | 2.3% | 5th |
| Parkdale—High Park | Andrew Borkowski | | M | Toronto | Pharmacist | 230 | 0.5% | 5th |
| Perth Wellington | Irma Devries | 2004, and 2006 candidate in this riding | F | Harriston | Farmer | 898 | 2.1% | 5th |
| Pickering—Scarborough East | Rick Chue | | M | Claremont | Construction Worker | 191 | 0.4% | 5th |
| Sarnia—Lambton | Christopher Desormeaux-Malm | | M | Chatham | Factory Line Operator | 545 | 1.2% | 5th |
| Simcoe—Grey | Peter Vander Zaag | 2004, and 2006 candidate in this riding | M | Alliston | Farmer/Scientist | 1,018 | 1.8% | 5th |
| Wellington—Halton Hills | Jeffrey Streutker | 1997 candidate in Northumberland | M | Georgetown | IT Specialist | 414 | 0.8% | 5th |
| Whitby—Oshawa | Yvonne Forbes | | F | Ajax | Mortgage Consultant | 395 | 0.7% | 5th |
| York—Simcoe | Vicki Gunn | 2004, and 2006 candidate in this riding | F | Sharon | Executive Director | 444 | 0.9% | 6th |

== Prince Edward Island - 4 seats ==
| Riding | Candidate's Name | Notes | Gender | Residence | Occupation | Votes | % | Rank |
|---|---|---|---|---|---|---|---|---|
| Charlottetown | Baird Judson | 1988, 1993, 1997, 2000, 2004, and 2006 candidate in this riding | M | Alexandra | Retired | 124 | 0.7% | 5th |

== Quebec - 75 seats ==
| Riding | Candidate's Name | Notes | Gender | Residence | Occupation | Votes | % | Rank |
|---|---|---|---|---|---|---|---|---|
| Louis-Hébert | Stefan Jetchick | 2006 candidate in this riding | M | Quebec | Interpreter | 119 | 0.2% | 6th |
| Montmagny—L'Islet—Kamouraska—Rivière-du-Loup | Aubert Cote | | M | Saint-Bruno | Food Processor | 147 | 0.3% | 6th |

== Saskatchewan - 14 seats ==
| Riding | Candidate | Notes | Gender | Residence | Occupation | Votes | % | Rank |
|---|---|---|---|---|---|---|---|---|
| Battlefords—Lloydminster | Harold Stephan | 2004, and 2006 candidate in this riding | M | Lloydminster | Plumber | 368 | 1.4% | 5th |
| Saskatoon—Rosetown—Biggar | Marcel Leon Bourassa | 2006 candidate in this riding | M | Saskatoon | Minister | 115 | 0.4% | 6th |

== See also ==
- Results of the Canadian federal election, 2008
- Results by riding for the Canadian federal election, 2008
