= Christian Heritage Party of Canada candidates in the 1997 Canadian federal election =

The Christian Heritage Party of Canada ran 53 candidates in the 1997 federal election, none of whom were elected.

== Manitoba ==
=== Martin Dewit (Portage—Lisgar) ===
Dewit is a resident of Carman, Manitoba, and has listed his occupation as a construction contractor. He first campaigned for the House of Commons of Canada in the 1993 federal election, and finished fifth against Reform candidate Jake Hoeppner with 399 votes in Lisgar—Marquette.

He received 517 votes (1.53%) in the 1997 election, again placing fifth against Hoeppner.

A Martin Dewit has been credited by the Carman Fire Department for playing the character "Sparks the Clown" in instructional lessons for children. This is presumably the same person. As of 2005, there is a Martin Dewit Auctioneering Company in Carman.

=== Paul Kalyniuk (Selkirk—Interlake) ===
Kalyniuk was a bus driver for Winnipeg Transit. He wrote a letter to the Winnipeg Free Press during the 1993 federal election, supporting the Christian Heritage Party and suggesting that party leader Heather Stilwell be including in the federal party leaders' debate. In 1997, he received 363 votes (0.94%) to finish fifth against Reform Party candidate Howard Hilstrom.

In 1999, Kalyniuk complained that his tax dollars went toward services he disapproved of, including abortion, gender-affirming surgery, and NATO's military actions in Kosovo. Two years later, he criticized efforts to promote judicial lenience for Robert Latimer, a Saskatchewan man who was found guilty of murdering his severely handicapped daughter in what some described as a mercy killing.

== Other candidates (detailed entry not prepared) ==
- Colin George Atkins (Brandon-Souris, Manitoba) (multiple elections)
- Angela M. Braun (Stoney Creek, Ontario)
- Rodger N. Brown (Fraser Valley, British Columbia)
- Durk T. Bruinsma (Durham, Ontario) (multiple elections)
- David W. Bylsma (Niagara Centre, Ontario) (multiple elections)
- Randy Cliff (Richmond, British Columbia)
- Mia Colaris (Simcoe-Grey, Ontario)
- Ken De Vries (London North Centre, Ontario) (multiple elections)
- Peter Ellis (Guelph-Wellington, Ontario) (multiple elections)
- Tristan Emmanuel (St. Catharines, Ontario) (also ran in byelection 1996)
- Laurent Filion (Argenteuil--Papineau, Quebec) (also ran in 2000, 2004)
- Rod Freeman (Skeena, British Columbia)
- Claude Grant (Gatineau, Quebec)
- Allen Gray (Surrey North, British Columbia)
- Ron Gray (Hull--Aylmer, Quebec) (many-time candidate)
- Harry Hannis (Dewdney-Alouette, British Columbia)
- Dr. Jamie Harris (Perth-Middlesex, Ontario)
- Larry R. Heather (Calgary Southwest, Alberta) (multiple elections)
- Marcia Cecile Husson (South Surrey-White Rock-Langley, British Columbia)
- Roger James (Kent-Essex, Ontario) (also ran in 2000)
- Dave Joslin (Huron-Bruce, Ontario) (multiple elections)
- Baird Judson (Hillsborough, P.E.I.) (ran in all general elections 1988-2008)
- Gloria Kieler (Vancouver East, British Columbia) (also ran 2000, 2004)
- Alfred Kiers (Erie-Lincoln, Ontario) (also ran 1993; also ran for Conservatives, 2008)
- Ian Knight (York North, Ontario) (also ran 1993, 2000)
- John Krell (Vancouver Island North, British Columbia) (also ran 1988, 2000)
- Gordon Allan Liddle (Wetaskiwin, Alberta)
- Harold John Ludwig (Langley-Abbotsford, British Columbia) (multiple elections)
- John B. Ludwig (Edmonton East, Alberta)
- Terry M. Marshall (Kingston and the Islands, Ontario) (multiple elections)
- Joe Pal (Delta-South Richmond, British Columbia) (also ran 2004, 2006)
- Donny F. Platt (Leeds-Grenville, Ontario)
- Monica Purcell (Hamilton East, Ontario)
- David J. Reimer (Winnipeg North—St. Paul, Manitoba) (multiple elections)
- Thomas Sabourin (Pontiac--Gatineau--Labelle, Quebec) (also ran in 2000)
- Robert Scott (Winnipeg Transcona, Manitoba) (multiple elections)
- Nellie Slingerland (Lethbridge, Alberta)
- Ron Steenbergen (Elgin-Middlesex-London, Ontario)
- Bill Stilwell (Surrey Central, British Columbia) (also ran in 1988, 1993)
- Jeffrey Streutker (Northumberland, Ontario) (also ran in 2008)
- Kenneth L. Switzer (Hastings-Frontenac-Lennox and Addington, Ontario) (also ran in 2000)
- Ian Town (Scarborough East, Ontario)
- Stuart Allan Town (Okanagan-Coquihalla, British Columbia)
- Dan Vander Kooi (Barrie-Simcoe-Bradford, Ontario)
- John Van Der Woude (Prince George-Bulkley Valley), British Columbia) (also ran in 1993, 2000)
- Paul Van Oosten (Sarnia-Lambton, Ontario)
- Ken Willis (Lambton-Kent-Middlesex, Ontario) (also ran in 1993)
- Stan Winters (London West, Ontario) (also ran in 1993)
- Brian J. Zacharias (West Kootenay-Okanagan, British Columbia) (also ran in 1993)
- John Zekveld (Oxford, Ontario)

=== Byelection candidate, 1997–2000 ===
- Ron Gray (Hull--Aylmer, Quebec)
