= Christian Heritage Party of Canada candidates in the 1993 Canadian federal election =

The Christian Heritage Party of Canada fielded 59 candidates in the 1993 federal election, none of whom were elected. Information about these candidates may be found on this page.

== Manitoba ==
=== Abe Neufeld (Brandon—Souris) ===
Neufeld is a Mennonite pastor. He was minister of the Zion Mennonite Church in Swift Current, Saskatchewan, from 1960 to 1969, and minister of the Steinbach Mennonite Church from 1976 to 1992. Now retired, he still presides over occasional services in Winnipeg.

Electoral record
Election	Division	Party	Votes	%	Place	Winner
1988 federal	Brandon—Souris	Christian Heritage Party	1,324		5/7	Lee Clark, Progressive Conservative
1993 federal	Brandon—Souris	Christian Heritage Party	339	0.92	5/8	Glen McKinnon, Liberal

== Other candidates ==
- Robert Adams (Saint-Henri—Westmount, QC) (also ran in 1988)
- Joe Appleman (Northumberland, ON)
- Marc Bianco (Halton—Peel, ON)
- Jean Blaquière (Verchères, QC) (won party leadership in 1994, stepped down, 1995) (also ran in 1995 byelection)
- Bill Boesterd (Fraser Valley East, BC)
- Tim Bonner (Mission—Coquitlam, BC)
- Mae Boudreau-Pedersen (Beauséjour, NB) (also ran in 1990 byelection)
- Gerald Lionel Brinders (Kootenay East, BC) (also ran in 1988)
- Durk T. Bruinsma (Durham, ON) (multiple elections)
- David W. Bylsma (St. Catharines, ON) (multiple elections)
- Geoffrey Capp (Yukon, YT) (multiple elections)
- Brian Chiasson (Oshawa, ON)
- Bob A. Dekraker (Elgin-Norfolk, ON)
- Ken De Vries (London West, ON) (multiple elections)
- Martin Dewit (Lisgar—Marquette, MB) (also ran in 1997)
- Louis Duke (Sarnia—Lambton, ON) (also ran in 2000)
- Jack Enserink (Annapolis Valley-Hants, NS) (also ran in 1988)
- Keith Gee (Delta, BC) (also ran in 1988)
- Ken Goudy (Mackenzie, SK)
- John Freddie Gunn (Malpeque, PE)
- Larry Heather (Calgary West, AB) (multiple elections)
- Baird Judson (Hillsborough, PE) (multiple elections)
- Alfred Kiers (Erie, ON) (was a party leadership candidate in 1994) (also ran in 1997)
- Ian Knight (York—Simcoe, ON) (also ran in 1997, 2000)
- Ted Kryn (Waterloo, ON)
- Louis 'Luke' Kwantes (Skeena, BC)
- Cor Labots (Edmonton East, AB)
- Isaac Legere (Moncton, NB)
- Darren Lowe (Vancouver Centre, BC)
- Terry M. Marshall (Kingston and the Islands, ON) (multiple elections)
- Steve McLean (Cumberland-Colchester, NS)
- Walter Opmeer (Vancouver Quadra, BC)
- Ivor Ottrey (Medicine Hat, AB) (was a party leadership candidate in 1994)
- Hugh Owens (Regina—Wascana, SK)
- Rudy Penner (St. Albert, AB)
- Michael Picard (Cambridge, ON)
- Peter Piers (Yellowhead, AB)
- Bert Prins (Prince George—Bulkley Valley, BC) (also ran in 1988)
- Pat Schiebel (Kitchener, ON)
- Robert Scott (Winnipeg Transcona, MB) (multiple elections)
- Bill Stilwell (Surrey North, BC) (also ran in 1988, 1997)
- Heather Stilwell (Surrey—White Rock—South Langley, BC) (PARTY LEADER, 1993–1994)
- Hans Strikwerda (Oxford, ON) (also ran in 1988)
- Dave Switzer (Prince Edward—Hastings, ON) (also ran in 2008)
- Judy Thompson (Carleton-Gloucester, ON)
- Ann Marie Tomlins (Simcoe Centre, ON)
- Bob Tremblett (St. John's East, NF) (also ran in 1988)
- Eric Truijen (Selkirk—Red River, MB) (multiple elections)
- Ron Van Den Enden (Hamilton—Wentworth, ON)
- Sid Vander Heide (Perth—Wellington—Waterloo, ON)
- John Van Der Woude (Prince George—Peace River, BC) (also ran in 1997, 2000)
- Edward John Vanwoudenberg (Fraser Valley West, BC) (also ran in 1988, 2000)
- Clyde Vint (Richmond, BC)
- Donald Waterhouse (Victoria-Haliburton, ON)
- Ken Willis (Lambton-Middlesex, ON) (also ran in 1997)
- Stan Winters (London-Middlesex, ON) (also ran in 1997)
- Brian Zacharias (Kootenay West—Revelstoke, BC) (also ran in 1997)
- Henry Zekveld (Huron—Bruce, ON) (also ran in 2006, 2008)

== Byelection candidates, 1993–1997 ==
- Gilles Gauthier (Ottawa—Vanier, Ontario) (Feb 13, 1995)
- Jean Blaquière (Brome—Missisquoi, Quebec) (Feb 13, 1995) (stepped down as leader, Nov 1995)
- Ron Gray (Etobicoke North, Ontario) (Mar 25, 1996) (leadership victor, Nov 1995)
- Tristan Alexander Emmanuel (Hamilton East, Ontario) (Jun 17, 1996)
