= Charles Cavilla =

Canadian politician

Charles Cavilla is a Canadian politician. He was the leader of the Christian Heritage Party of Canada from the convention at Ottawa in October 1991 until March 1993. A difference of vision on leadership between Cavilla and the party board resulted in the transfer of leadership on an interim basis to Heather Stilwell. Cavilla characterized the transfer of leadership as an "illegal act." Cavilla is married to Eileen and has eight children, and fifteen grandchildren.

== Electoral record ==
Electoral record
Election	Division	Party	Votes	%	Place	Winner
1988 federal	Lethbridge	CHP	2,932	6.4%	5/5	Blaine Thacker Prog. Cons.

Preceded by Ed Vanwoudenberg	Christian Heritage Party of Canada leaders 1991-1993	Succeeded by Heather Stilwell
