= Christian Heritage Party of Canada candidates in the 2011 Canadian federal election =

This is a list of the 46 candidates that ran for the Christian Heritage Party of Canada in the 41st Canadian federal election.

== Alberta ==
Riding	Candidate's Name	Notes	Gender	Residence	Occupation	Votes	%	Rank
Crowfoot	Gerard Groenendijk		Male	Coalhurst		204	0.39	6/6
Lethbridge	Geoffrey Capp		Male	Lethbridge		1716	3.57	5/5
Macleod	Marc Slingerland		Male	Lethbridge		252	0.49	6/6
Medicine Hat	Frans VandeStroet		Male	Iron Springs		317	0.74	5/5
Vegreville—Wainwright	Matthew Sokalski		Male	Vegreville		327	0.66	5/5
Wild Rose	Randy Vanden Broek		Male	Shaughnessy		181	0.31	5/5
Yellowhead	Jacob Strydhorst		Male	Neerlandia		404	0.97	5/6

In addition, CHP party member Larry Heather, a candidate in previous elections, ran as an independent in Calgary Southwest, referencing the CHP policies and website on his election campaign website. He received 303 votes, 0.53% of the votes, placing 5th of 5 candidates.

== British Columbia ==
Riding	Candidate's Name	Notes	Gender	Residence	Occupation	Votes	%	Rank
Cariboo—Prince George	Henry Thiessen		Male	Vanderhoof		440	1.01	5/7
Kamloops—Thompson—Cariboo	Chris Kempling		Male	Kamloops		191	0.34	5/5
Nanaimo—Alberni	Frank Wagner		Male	Nanaimo		94	0.14	6/7
Skeena—Bulkley Valley	Rod Taylor		Male	Smithers		1038	2.95	5/6
South Surrey—White Rock—Cloverdale	Mike Schouten		Male			429	0.73	6/9
Surrey North	Kevin Pielak		Male	Surrey		303	0.82	6/7

== Manitoba ==
Riding	Candidate's Name	Notes	Gender	Residence	Occupation	Votes	%	Rank
Portage—Lisgar	Jerome Dondo		Male			805	2.27	5/5
Provencher	David J. Reimer		Male			510	1.29	5/6

== New Brunswick ==
Riding	Candidate's Name	Notes	Gender	Residence	Occupation	Votes	%	Rank
New Brunswick Southwest	Jason Farris		Male	McAdam Keswick, New Brunswick	Entrepreneur	450	1.41	5/5

== Nova Scotia ==
Riding	Candidate's Name	Notes	Gender	Residence	Occupation	Votes	%	Rank
Cumberland—Colchester—Musquodoboit Valley	Jim Hnatiuk		Male			375	0.93	5/5

== Ontario ==
Riding	Candidate's Name	Notes	Gender	Residence	Occupation	Votes	%	Rank
Don Valley East	Ryan Kidd		Male			246	0.63	5/5
Durham	Andrew Moriarity		Male			462	0.79	5/6
Elgin—Middlesex—London	Carl Hiemstra		Male			582	1.15	5/6
Etobicoke North	John C. Gardner		Male			186	0.58	6/6
Haldimand—Norfolk	Steven Elgersma		Male			435	0.86	5/5
Halton	Antonio 'Tony' Rodrigues		Male			249	0.31	5/5
Hamilton Mountain	Jim Enos		Male			270	0.50	5/6
Lambton—Kent—Middlesex	Mike Janssens		Male	Strathroy		413	0.81	5/5
London—Fanshawe	G.J. Rancourt		Male			535	1.26	5/5
Niagara Falls	Harold Jonker		Male			259	0.48	5/5
Niagara West—Glanbrook	Bryan Jongbloed		Male			1199	2.04	5/5
Oxford	John Markus		Male			776	1.63	5/5
Parkdale—High Park	Andrew Borkowski		Male			251	0.49	5/7
Perth Wellington	Irma N DeVries		Female			806	1.74	5/5
Sarnia—Lambton	Christopher Desormeaux-Malm		Male			514	1.03	5/5
Sault Ste. Marie	Randy Riauka		Male			111	0.25	5/6
Simcoe—Grey	Peter Vander Zaag		Male			757	1.18	6/7
Simcoe North	Adrian Kooger		Male			322	0.56	5/5
St. Catharines	Dave Bylsma		Male			357	0.71	5/6
Welland	David Vangoolen		Male			299	0.58	5/7
Wellington—Halton Hills	Jeffrey Streutker		Male			316	0.57	5/5
York—Simcoe	Vicki Gunn		Female			352	0.67	5/6
York West	George Okoth Otura		Male			231	0.83	5/6

== Prince Edward Island ==
Riding	Candidate's Name	Notes	Gender	Residence	Occupation	Votes	%	Rank
Charlottetown	Baird Judson	Perennial Candidate 1988–present	Male			87	0.47	5/5

== Quebec ==
Riding	Candidate's Name	Notes	Gender	Residence	Occupation	Votes	%	Rank
Beauport—Limoilou	Anne-Marie Genest		Female			124	0.24	6/7
Charlesbourg—Haute-Saint-Charles	Simon Cormier		Male			189	0.35	6/6
Louis-Hébert	Marie-Claude Bouffard		Female			143	0.24	6/6
Louis-Saint-Laurent	Daniel Arseneault		Male			175	0.31	6/6
Québec	Stefan Jetchick		Male			228	0.43	6/6

== See also ==
- Results of the Canadian federal election, 2011
- Christian Heritage Party of Canada candidates, 2008 Canadian federal election
