= Stephen Downey =

Stephen Downey may refer to:

- Stephen Wheeler Downey (1839–1902), delegate to the United States House of Representatives from Wyoming Territory and "Father of the University of Wyoming"
- Stephen Downey (Canadian politician)

== See also ==
- Steve Downie (born 1987), Canadian ice hockey player
