= Rachael Thomas =

Canadian politician (born 1986)

Rachael Thomas MP
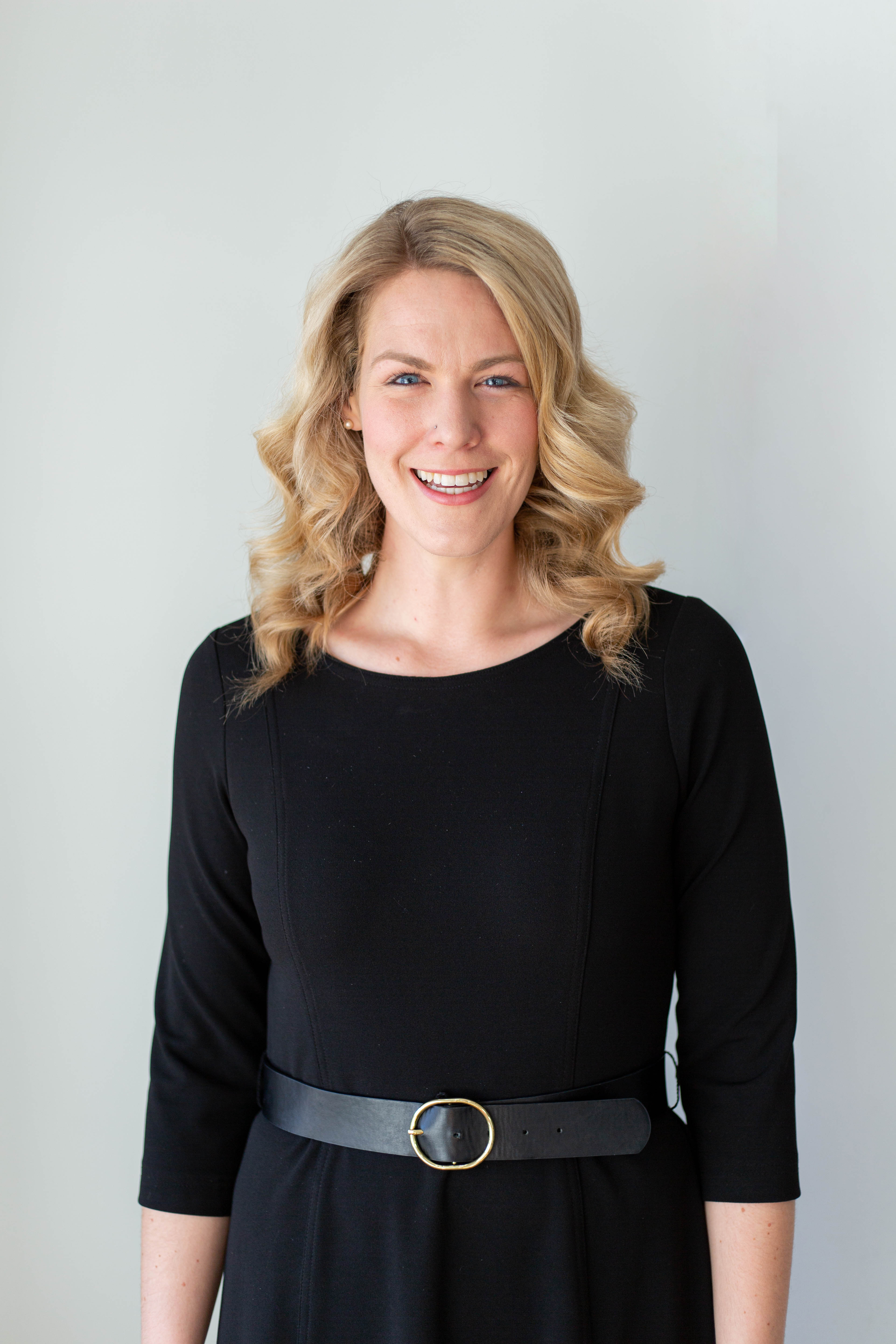
- Thomas in 2018

Member of Parliament for Lethbridge
- Incumbent
- Assumed office October 19, 2015
- Preceded by: Jim Hillyer

Personal details
- Born: Rachael Harder; 1986 (age 39–40) Calgary, Alberta, Canada
- Party: Conservative
- Spouse: Victor Thomas
- Education: Briercrest College and Seminary (AA); University of Lethbridge (BA, BEd)

Rachael Thomas (née Harder) MP (born 1986) is a Canadian politician who was elected to represent the riding of Lethbridge in the House of Commons of Canada in the 2015 federal election. A member of the Conservative Party, she was reelected in the 2019 and 2021 federal elections, and has been the Shadow Minister for Canadian Heritage since October 2022. Previously, Thomas has also served as the Official Opposition critic for Youth and Persons with Disabilities, the Status of Women, and Digital Government.

== Early life and education ==
Harder was born in Calgary, Alberta and grew up on a small horse farm in Kathyrn, Alberta, where she was the third of five children. When she was nine years old, she planned a dog kennel business with her parents. Harder engaged in humanitarian work in Mexican orphanages and African health clinics and schools. She graduated from Briercrest College and Seminary in Saskatchewan, and was named its young alumnus of the year in 2012. Harder then moved back to Alberta to attend the University of Lethbridge, where she graduated with a Bachelor of Education and Bachelor of Social Science.

Harder worked as a youth and young adult consultant and published a paper on emerging trends for young Canadians. The report, Hemorrhaging faith: Why and when Canadian young adults are leaving, staying and returning to church was commissioned by the Evangelical Fellowship of Canada and was published in 2012 by Harder and her four co-authors. Using 72 interviews and almost 3,000 survey responses, it studied how and why younger Canadians aged 18–34 were increasingly leaving the church. A review of the report by Kelvin F. Mutter, an associate professor at McMaster Divinity College, praised it as "a sound piece of research" and "a vital resource for anyone interested in ministering with youth and young adults". Mutter also gave minor criticisms of the report for being largely limited to description and analysis instead of solutions, and not devoting more time to early childhood and family spiritual practices because of its scope being limited to young adults.

== Political career ==
=== 2015 election and 42nd Parliament ===
Harder won the nomination race to become the Conservative Party candidate for the riding of Lethbridge for the 2015 federal election. The former MP for the riding, Jim Hillyer, chose to run in the adjacent riding of Medicine Hat—Cardston—Warner, which was created after the 2012 Canadian federal electoral redistribution. During Harder's campaign, Harder filled out a survey from the anti-abortion Campaign Life Coalition indicating that she would work to pass laws banning abortion if elected. Later, the Lethbridge Herald reported that she said that all women deserve access to abortion at a campaign town hall. The Campaign Life Coalition then contacted Harder's campaign to verify their "pro-life" rating of her on the organization's website, and restored the profile, claiming that Harder's campaign manager told them that the Herald had misquoted her.

Harder was elected, becoming the first woman MP to represent the traditionally Conservative riding. In November 2015, she was chosen by interim Conservative leader Rona Ambrose to serve as official opposition critic for Youth and Persons with Disabilities. In April 2016, she also became the assistant critic for Health. In Summer 2016, Harder gave nearly $12,000 of the Canada Summer Jobs Grant funds allocated to her as an MP to two Lethbridge pregnancy care centres that do not perform abortions or refer patients to abortion clinics.

During the 2017 Conservative Party leadership election, Harder endorsed Erin O'Toole, who failed to win the leadership. In August 2017, Andrew Scheer, the new Conservative leader, named Harder to his shadow cabinet as critic for the Status of Women. Anti-abortion group RightNow praised Scheer for choosing Harder for the Status of Women critic portfolio. Shortly after taking on the position, in response to media questions about her position on abortion, Harder issued a statement that she would follow the Conservative Party's official position on not re-opening the abortion issue in Canada.

On September 1, 2017, Harder, along with fellow Conservative MP Tony Clement, were banned from entering Azerbaijan because they visited the disputed region of Nagorno-Karabakh, which is occupied by Armenia as part of an ongoing conflict. The trip to the region was paid for by One Free World International, a Toronto non-profit group. The executive director of the Armenian National Committee of Canada, Sevag Belian, accompanied Harder and Clement and arranged for them to meet senior government officials on their trip.

In late September 2017, Harder was nominated by fellow Conservative MPs to be the Chair of the House Status of Women Committee, which by convention is chaired by an MP from an opposition party. However, Liberal and NDP members of the committee walked out of the meeting to deny quorum during which the vote to fill the Chair position would have been held, in protest of Harder's anti-abortion voting record and her previous endorsement by the Campaign Life Coalition. The following week, on October 3, the Liberals used their majority on the committee, and also with the support of the committee's only NDP MP, Sheila Malcolmson, to instead nominate and confirm Conservative pro-choice MP Karen Vecchio as Chair over her objections. Afterwards, Vecchio, the Conservative critic for families, children and social development, and Harder issued a joint statement accusing the Liberals of politicizing the Chair selection process and of bullying Harder as a distraction from their recent tax changes.

In October 2018, Harder introduced Bill C-419, the Credit Card Fairness Act. The bill sought to implement measures to end misleading banking practices in the credit card industry and help consumers make informed choices about the use of credit cards. Bill C-419 was defeated at the second reading.

From February 2019 to August 2020, Harder was the Chair of the House Standing Committee for Access to Information, Privacy and Ethics, as well as its subcommittee on agenda and procedure. In March 2019, Harder spearheaded the creation of an inter-parliamentary friendship group between Canada and the Republic of Artsakh, and held its inaugural meeting in association with the Armenian National Committee of Canada. For her role, Harder received a letter of thanks from Ashot Ghulyan, the President of the National Assembly of Artsakh. From April 2019 to February 2020, Harder was a member of the executive of the Canada-Europe Parliamentary Association.

=== 2019 election and 43rd Parliament ===
In October 2019, Harder was reelected with 65.8% of the popular vote. Harder's Conservative platform for the 2019 federal election included a focus on the expansion of the energy sector, and the completion of pipelines. Her environmental positions included ending carbon pricing in Canada, and prohibiting the dumping of sewage in waterways such as the West Coast and the St. Lawrence River. Harder also cited crime and the opioid crisis as a major issue to be tackled, as well as an advance of aid to local peace officers.

In November 2019, Conservative leader Andrew Scheer removed Harder from her shadow cabinet critic portfolio in a post-election shuffle. In November 2020, Harder received public criticism for sharing on Facebook a Toronto Sun column which highlighted official Alberta Health statistics which showed that up to that point only 10 people who died of COVID-19 in Alberta during the pandemic had no comorbidities. After almost a thousand comments, mostly criticizing her perceived insensitivity to the hundreds dead who had comorbidities, Harder edited her original post to add that it was important to protect the most vulnerable during a pandemic.

After Erin O'Toole, whom Harder had backed for leadership in 2017, won the 2020 Conservative leadership election to succeed Scheer as party leader, Harder returned to the shadow cabinet in the February 2021 shuffle as the critic for Digital Government.

In July 2021, Harder was one of 62 Conservative MPs to vote against a bill banning conversion therapy in Canada.

=== 2021 election and 44th Parliament ===
In September 2021, Harder was reelected with approximately 55% of the popular vote. In November 2021, she legally changed her last name to "Thomas" after her marriage earlier in the year, and began using it for her parliamentary work. During Erin O'Toole's post-election reshuffling of the shadow cabinet, Thomas was not granted a Shadow Cabinet position, it has been speculated that this is due to her stance on vaccination during the COVID-19 pandemic in Canada.

In December 2021, Thomas posted a Facebook Live video, in which she asked for respect and appreciation for unvaccinated Canadians and falsely suggested that the vaccinated were more likely to be hospitalized for COVID-19 than the unvaccinated. Thomas also suggested that being unvaccinated and taking rapid tests was safer than vaccination. At the time of the video being posted, two-thirds of those hospitalized in Alberta for COVID-19 were unvaccinated, despite only making up one-fifth of the population. According to Timothy Caulfield, the Canada Research Chair in Health Law and Policy at the University of Alberta, Thomas's video incorrectly portrayed science as supporting her claims and was harmful misinformation that could lead to vaccine hesitancy.

In March 2022, Thomas made a statement in the House of Commons defining a dictator as "a ruler with total power over a country, typically one who has obtained control by force" and said that many Canadians agree that such a definition applied to Prime Minister Justin Trudeau. She then said that whether Trudeau is a dictator would be determined in the next federal election. The statement was criticized by Mark Gerretsen, Parliamentary Secretary to the Government House Leader, fellow Conservative MP Michelle Rempel Garner, and United Conservative premier of Alberta Jason Kenney, among others, for inaccurately equating Trudeau to actual dictators.

In October 2022, new Conservative leader Pierre Poilievre named Thomas Shadow Minister for Canadian Heritage. In November 2023, Thomas apologized to Canadian Heritage Minister Pascale St-Onge, who is from Quebec, for requesting an answer in English during heritage committee meetings.

=== 2025 election and 45th Parliament ===
In April 2025, Harder was re-elected and elected vice chair of the Canadian House of Commons Standing Committee on Canadian Heritage in the 45th Canadian Parliament.

== Personal life ==
In June 2021, Harder married Victor Thomas at the Banff Springs Hotel. Thomas is a Christian.

== Electoral record ==
2021 Canadian federal election
Party	Candidate	Votes	%	±%
Conservative	Rachael Harder	32,817	55.38	-10.07
New Democratic	Elaine Perez	11,386	19.22	+4.48
Liberal	Devon Hargreaves	8,928	15.07	+1.41
People's	Kimmie Hovan	4,097	6.91	+5.45
Independent	Kim Siever	1,179	1.99	
Christian Heritage	Geoffrey Capp	566	0.96	-0.13
Total valid votes		58,973		
Total rejected ballots		282		
Turnout		66.13	-2.96	
Eligible voters		89,663		
Source: Elections Canada
Conservative hold		Swing		-7.28

2019 Canadian federal election: Lethbridge
Party	Candidate	Votes	%	±%	Expenditures
Conservative	Rachael Thomas	40,713	65.79	+9.03	$81,336.37
New Democratic	Shandi Bleiken	9,110	14.72	–5.78	$30,986.97
Liberal	Amy Bronson	8,443	13.64	–4.86	$38,096.11
Green	Stephnie Watson	1,939	3.13	+0.56	$1,233.16
People's	Grant Hepworth	1,007	1.63	–	none listed
Christian Heritage	Marc Slingerland	670	1.08	–0.23	$12,957.85
Total valid votes/expense limit		61,882	99.46	–	$113,789.66
Total rejected ballots		335	0.54	+0.26	
Turnout		62,217	69.09	+1.38	
Eligible voters		90,051			
Conservative hold		Swing		+7.42	
Source: Elections Canada

2015 Canadian federal election
Party	Candidate	Votes	%	±%	Expenditures
Conservative	Rachael Harder	32,321	56.8	+4.29	–
New Democratic	Cheryl Meheden	11,674	20.5	-9.45	–
Liberal	Mike Pyne	10,532	18.5	+9.37	–
Green	Kas MacMillan	1,461	2.6	-1.88	–
Christian Heritage	Geoffrey Capp	746	1.3	-2.27	–
Rhinoceros	Solly Krygier-Paine	209	0.4	–	–
Total valid votes/Expense limit		56,943	100.0		$215,495.48
Total rejected ballots		158	–	–	
Turnout		57,101	69.44%	–	
Eligible voters		82,225			
Conservative hold		Swing		+6.87	
Source: Elections Canada
