= John Horne Blackmore =

Canadian politician

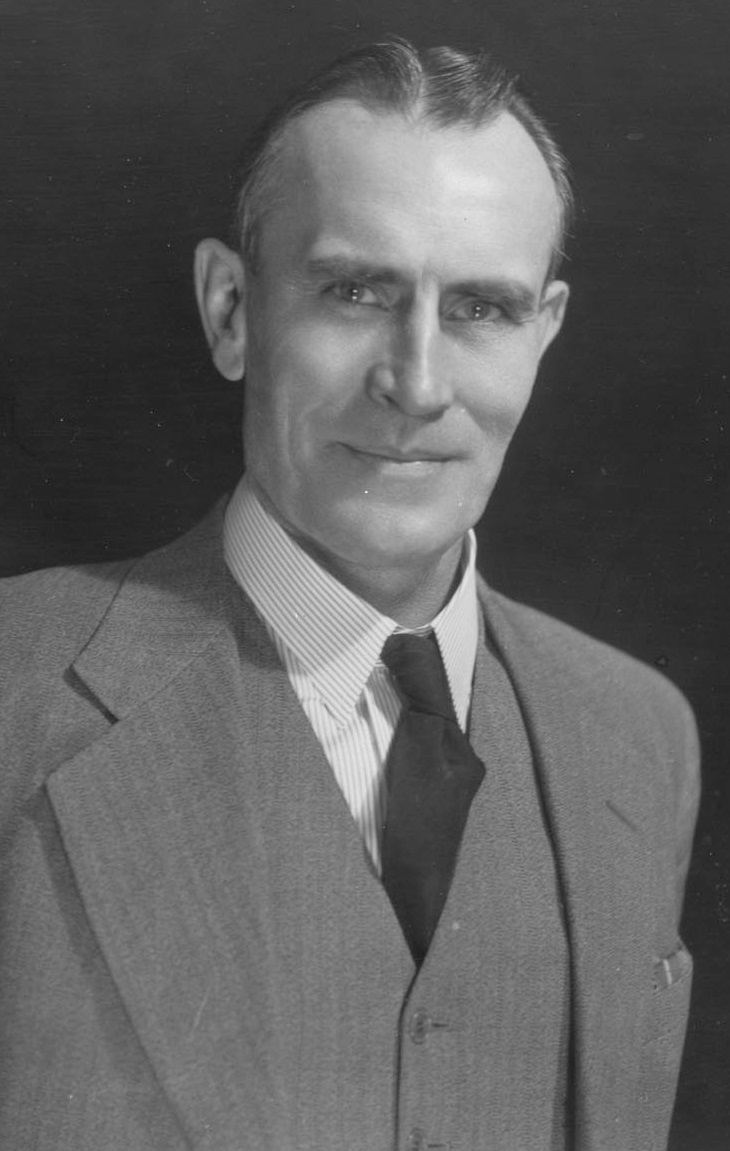
- Blackmore in the 1940s

Parliamentary leader of the (Western) Social Credit League
- In office October 14, 1935 – April 6, 1944
- Preceded by: Position established
- Succeeded by: Solon Earl Low

Member of Parliament for Lethbridge
- In office October 14, 1935 – March 31, 1958
- Preceded by: John Smith Stewart
- Succeeded by: Deane Gundlock

Personal details
- Born: March 27, 1890 Sublett, Idaho, U.S.
- Died: May 2, 1971 (aged 81) Cardston, Alberta
- Party: Social Credit
- Profession: Teacher, principal

John Horne Blackmore (March 27, 1890 – May 2, 1971) was a Canadian school teacher, principal, and politician. He was one of the first elected members and leaders of the Social Credit Party of Canada, a political party in Canada that promoted the social credit theories of monetary reform.

== Life and career ==
Born in Sublett, Idaho, he immigrated to the Cardston area as a child. He was brought up in a Mormon household.

He attended Calgary Normal School and the University of Alberta.

Blackmore was elected to the House of Commons of Canada in the 1935 election as Member of Parliament representing Lethbridge, Alberta. The Social Credit movement had swept to power in Alberta in the 1935 provincial election just weeks earlier. He was chosen the party's parliamentary leader, since its most famous spokesperson, William Aberhart, had just become the premier of Alberta.

He published Money the Master Key, a book based on his speeches, in 1939. The book describes "Money Power," "the Designing Will that pulls hidden strings."

In 1939, Social Credit merged into William Herridge's New Democracy movement, with Herridge acknowledged as the new party's leader. However, Herridge himself failed to win a seat in the 1940 federal election. In the subsequent 19th Canadian Parliament, Blackmore acted as leader of the elected New Democracy MPs, all Social Crediters.

Blackmore served as party leader until 1944, when Social Credit held its first national convention and acclaimed as leader Solon Earl Low, the provincial treasurer of Alberta at the time. Blackmore retained his Lethbridge seat until he was defeated in the 1958 election in which Social Credit lost all of its MPs. (The Progressive Conservatives won all seventeen Alberta seats although they got less than 60 percent of the votes cast in Alberta.)

Blackmore was the first Mormon to be elected to the Canadian House of Commons.

He was excommunicated in 1947 for "teaching and advocating the doctrine of plural marriage" at secret meetings in Southern Alberta. At such meetings, men debated whether Mormon leaders were wrong to have renounced Joseph Smith's revelation regarding polygamy. Though not a polygamist himself, Blackmore urged Parliament to repeal the anti-polygamy law and succeeded in removing specific references to Mormons in the law. His nephew, Winston Blackmore, is the leader of Canada's largest polygamist group and was charged by the Royal Canadian Mounted Police with polygamy in 2009. He challenged the law's constitutionality.

Blackmore was criticized for his views on Jews, and the Encyclopaedia Judaica said he "frequently gave public aid and comfort to anti-Semitism." In 1953, it was reported that Blackmore was distributing the antisemitic Protocols of the Elders of Zion from his parliamentary office. However, in a speech he made in the House of Commons on January 31, 1944 (see Hansard records) he advocated for the establishment of "a national homeland for the Jews" in Palestine.

In his last interview in 2009, Arch MacKenzie, a longtime Parliament Hill reporter and Canadian Press bureau chief described Blackmore as the worst Member of Parliament he ever observed in his long career. According to MacKenzie, Hawthorne was "a kook, just out of control, and a blatherskite" infamous in the press gallery for his racism.

Blackmore is a relative of the author Flora Jessop and her sister, Ruby Jessop.

Party political offices
Preceded by Party created	House of Commons leader of Social Credit; 1935–1944	Succeeded by Solon Earl Low
Parliament of Canada
Preceded by John Smith Stewart	Member of Parliament Lethbridge; 1935–1958	Succeeded by Deane Gundlock
