= Christian Heritage Party of Canada candidates in the 2000 Canadian federal election =

The Christian Heritage Party of Canada (CHP) fielded 46 candidates in the 2000 Canadian federal election, none of whom were elected. Information about these candidates may be found here.

Federal electoral laws in effect at the time required a party to run 50 candidates in order to retain official status; as the CHP only was able to nominate 46 candidates by the nomination deadline, the party lost its registered status two days after the deadline. As a result, all of its candidates appeared on the ballot of the 2000 election as "non-affiliated". The party successfully ran at least 50 candidates in 2004 and regained status, and the law has since been changed to allow registration to parties running a single candidate.

This page also includes information about CHP candidates who contested by-elections between 2000 and 2004.

== Notable candidates ==
=== Tilly Bylsma (St. Catharines, Ontario) ===
Bylsma listed herself as a homemaker. She received 166 votes (0.36%), finishing sixth against Liberal incumbent Walt Lastewka. Her husband Bill and son David have also campaigned for the CHP.

=== Jean-Paul Kabashiki (St. Boniface, May 13, 2002) ===
Kabashiki received 210 votes (1.01%), finishing last in a field of six candidates. His expenses for the by-election came to almost $10,000, an unusually high total for a minor party candidate. The winner was Raymond Simard of the Liberal Party of Canada.

As of 2005, Kabashiki is listed as president of the CHP riding association in St. Boniface.

== Other candidates ==
- Colin G. Atkins (Brandon-Souris, MB)
- Ed Banninga (Sarnia-Lambton, ON)
- Anthony Barendregt (Selkirk-Interlake, MB)
- Durk T. Bruinsma (Durham, ON)
- David W. Bylsma (Erie-Lincoln, ON)
- Geoffrey Capp (Yukon)
- Victor Carvalho (Simcoe-Grey, ON)
- Samantha Demers (Gatineau, QC)
- Ken De Vries (Elgin-Middlesex-London, ON)
- Stephen Downey (Hamilton West, ON)
- Louis Duke (Chatham-Kent-Essex, ON)
- Frank Ellis (Kitchener-Waterloo, ON)
- Peter J. Ellis ( Waterloo-Wellington, ON)
- Laurent Filion (Argenteuil—Papineau—Mirabel, QC)
- John Gots (Cambridge, ON)
- Ron Gray (Hull-Aylmer, QC) (also ran in byelections, May 2002 Calgary, May 2003 Perth-Middlesex)
- Clay Harmon (Okanagan-Coquihalla, BC)
- Gerhard Herwig (Surrey North, BC)
- Roger James (Lambton-Kent-Middlesex, ON)
- George Joseph (Skeena, BC)
- Dave Joslin (Huron-Bruce, ON)
- Baird Judson (Hillsborough, PE) (also ran in 1997, 1993, 1988)
- Ryan Kidd (Don Valley East, ON)
- Gloria Kieler (Vancouver East, BC)
- Ian Knight (York North, ON) (also ran in 1997, 1993)
- Lesley Knight (Vaughan-King-Aurora, ON)
- Adrian Kooger (Simcoe North, ON)
- John Krell (Vancouver Island North, BC) (also ran in 1997, 1988)
- Tom Kroesbergen (Perth-Middlesex, ON)
- William Lorenson (Verdun—Saint-Henri—Saint-Paul—Pointe-Saint-Charles, QC)
- Harold John Ludwig (Langley-Abbotsford, BC) (also ran in 1997)
- John Thomas Markus (Oxford, ON)
- Dan Moreau (Saanich-Gulf Islands, BC)
- Mary Moreau (Victoria, BC)
- Thomas Sabourin (Pontiac—Gatineau—Labelle, QC) (also ran in 1997)
- Robert Scott (Winnipeg Transcona, MB) (also ran in 1997, 1993)
- Jacob Strydhorst (Yellowhead, AB)
- Kenneth Switzer (Hastings-Frontenac-Lennox and Addington, ON) (also ran in 1997)
- Eric Truijen (Winnipeg North-St. Paul, MB) (also ran in 1993)
- Gord Truscott (Guelph-Wellington, ON)
- John Van Der Woude (Prince George-Bulkley Valley, BC) (also ran in 1997, 1993)
- Ed Vanwoudenberg (Fraser Valley, BC) (also ran in 1997, 1993, 1988)
- Frank Wagner (Delta-South Richmond, BC)
- Brian White (Barrie-Simcoe-Bradford, ON)
- Iris Yawney (Dauphin-Swan River, MB)

== Byelections, 2000–2004 ==
- Ron Gray (Calgary Southwest, Alberta)
- Jean-Paul Kabashiki (Saint Boniface, Manitoba) (May 2002)
- James Allan (Windsor West, Ontario) (May 2002)
- Ron Gray (Perth-Middlesex, Ontario)
