= Kenneth Earl Hurlburt =

Canadian politician (1928–2016)

Member of Parliament for Lethbridge
- In office 1972–1979
- Preceded by: Deane Gundlock
- Succeeded by: Blaine Thacker

Personal details
- Born: April 10, 1928 Lethbridge, Alberta
- Died: July 17, 2016 (aged 88) Fort Macleod, Alberta
- Party: Progressive Conservative Party of Canada
- Profession: Auctioneer; businessman

Kenneth Earl Hurlburt (April 10, 1928 – July 17, 2016) was a Canadian Member of Parliament.

== Life ==
Kenneth Earl "The Hurler" Hurlburt was born on April 10, 1928, in Lethbridge, Alberta. He was a Canadian politician, and a member of Parliament in the 1970s. Prior to his political career he worked as an auctioneer, as well as a businessman. After retiring from politics in 1979, he started his own ranch outside of Lethbridge. He died in 2016 at the age of 88.

== Political career ==
Hurlburt was a member of the Progressive Conservative party, and ran in the Lethbridge, Alberta district, where he was elected in both the 1972 and 1974 federal elections. He served as a member of the Progressive Conservative caucus from 1973 to 1979. Hurlburt famously received his nickname, "The Hurler", in 1975 after a particularly animated session of parliament, during which a heated argument erupted between Hurlburt and a fellow representatives . The argument culminated in Hurlburt picking up his colleague and tossing him to the parliamentary floor. After this event Hurlburt was dubbed 'The Hurler' by the press, and the nickname stuck, with Hurlburt still referred by it to this day. Mr. Hurlburt was involved in a famous court case (1972–75) as to how he obtained his ranch.

=== Electoral results ===
1974 Canadian federal election: Lethbridge
Party	Candidate	Votes	%	±%
Progressive Conservative	Kenneth Earl Hurlburt	20,602	63.52	+5.72
Liberal	Sven Ericksen	7,075	21.81	–1.50
New Democratic	Bessie Annand	3,329	10.26	–1.82
Social Credit	Vern Young	1,428	4.40	–2.40
Total valid votes		32,434	99.66	
Total rejected ballots		111	0.34	–1.76
Turnout		32,545	67.63	–6.10
Eligible voters		48,125		
Progressive Conservative hold		Swing		+3.61
Source: Library of Parliament

1972 Canadian federal election: Lethbridge
Party	Candidate	Votes	%	±%
Progressive Conservative	Kenneth Earl Hurlburt	18,845	57.80	+12.85
Liberal	Andy Russell	7,601	23.31	–7.63
New Democratic	Hal Hoffman	3,941	12.09	+2.86
Social Credit	Keith L. Hancock	2,219	6.81	–8.08
Total valid votes		32,606	97.90	
Total rejected ballots		701	2.10	+1.47
Turnout		33,307	73.73	+0.17
Eligible voters		45,173		
Progressive Conservative hold		Swing		+10.24
Source: Library of Parliament
