= Deane Gundlock =

Canadian politician

Deane Roscoe Gundlock
- Official 1968 portrait

Member of Parliament for Lethbridge
- In office May 1958 – September 1972
- Preceded by: John Horne Blackmore
- Succeeded by: Ken Hulburt

Personal details
- Born: 11 August 1914 Warner, Alberta
- Died: 10 September 1986 (aged 72)
- Party: Progressive Conservative
- Profession: farmer

Deane Roscoe Gundlock (11 August 1914 – 10 September 1986) was as a Canadian farmer and politician from Alberta. He served as the Progressive Conservative (PC) Member of Parliament in the Lethbridge riding from 1958 until 1972. From 1963 to 1964, Gundlock served in the former PC prime minister John Diefenbaker's second shadow cabinet as the Critic for National Revenue. In 1964, Gundlock became the Assistant Critic for National Revenue.

Gundlock was born at Warner, Alberta and was a farmer by trade. He was also a municipal politician before his federal service, serving as reeve of Warner from 1950 to 1954 and before that as a councillor.
