= Christian Heritage Party of Canada candidates in the 2006 Canadian federal election =

The Christian Heritage Party is a minor political party in Canada. It fielded forty-five candidates in the 2006 federal election. Information about some of these candidates may be found here. The leader of the party at the time of the election was Ron Gray.

== Alberta ==
=== Larry R. Heather (Calgary Southwest) ===
Heather received 279 votes (0.49%), placing fifth against Conservative Party leader Stephen Harper.

== Manitoba ==
=== Colin George Atkins (Brandon—Souris) ===
See here for a complete profile. He has been a candidate for the CHP in four elections, including the 2006 election.

=== Robert Scott (Elmwood—Transcona) ===
See here for more information. Robert Scott has been candidate for the CHP in six elections.

=== David J. Reimer (Portage—Lisgar) ===
See here for more information. In 1988, Reimer received 3,087 votes for a fifth-place finish. This result remains one of the best in CHP history.

Reimer has been the interim deputy leader of the CHP. He spent over $10,000 in the 2004 campaign, a large sum for a minor-party candidate. His wife, Katharine Reimer, has also campaigned for the party.

=== Anthony Barendregt (Selkirk—Interlake) ===
Anthony Barendregt (born 1961 in British Columbia) is a politician in Manitoba, Canada. He has campaigned for the House of Commons of Canada on two occasions—once as an independent, and once for the Christian Heritage Party.

Barendregt moved to Manitoba in 1984, and obtained a Bachelor of Arts degree in History and Political Science from the University of Manitoba. He now works in the construction industry, and has been a supervisor, foreman and contractor on a number of projects. He has also been involved in youth outreach programs with aboriginal children, and spent many of his past summers working with the disabled in New Westminster, British Columbia.

He first ran for the House of Commons in the Canadian federal election of 2000, at a time when the CHP had been officially de-registered. Campaigning as an independent, he received 178 votes in Selkirk-Interlake.

The CHP were re-established by the 2004 election, and Barendregt again ran in the Selkirk—Interlake riding. He received 353 votes, or less than 1% of the total. On one occasion in this campaign, he claimed that the CHP would not increase funding to Canadian universities because they only consider postmodern views to be relevant.

=== Jane MacDiarmid (St. Boniface) ===
MacDiarmid was raised in Portage la Prairie, Manitoba, and holds Bachelor of Science and Bachelor of Education degrees from the University of Manitoba. She began working professionally as an educator since 1984, and has trained English as a Second Language employees in both the private and the public sector. At the time of the 2004 election, she was working towards the completion of a Master's Degree in ESL Training at Providence College. Her oldest child works as a church minister.

MacDiarmid was a Winnipeg-area school trustee for sixteen years, serving on the Charleswood/Tuxedo board for the division of Assiniboine South. She has also served as table officer on the Manitoba Association of School Trustees executive.

Electoral record
| Election | Division | Party | Votes | % | Place | Winner |
|---|---|---|---|---|---|---|
| 2004 federal | Winnipeg South | CHP | 296 | 0.79 | 5/5 | Reg Alcock, Liberal |
| 2006 federal | St. Boniface | CHP | 285 | | 5/5 | Raymond Simard, Liberal |

=== Eric Truijen (Winnipeg North) ===
See here for full details on the candidate.

=== Heidi Loewen-Steffano (Winnipeg South) ===
Loewen-Steffano (born April 20, 1975 in Winnipeg) is a homemaker, and is active as a foster mother. Her biography indicates that she has several years of university experience, working toward a degree in "Gang and Cult-related issues". She is a member of Soul Sanctuary in Winnipeg. She received 259 votes (0.62%), finishing fifth against Conservative candidate Rod Bruinooge.

== Ontario ==
=== Peter J. Ellis (Guelph) ===
See here for full information. Ellis has been a candidate for the Christian Heritage Party five times.

=== Stephen Downey (Hamilton Mountain) ===
Downey was born in Hamilton in 1965, and holds an honours certificate in Business Computer Applications from Mohawk College in the city. He has been a member of the Christian Heritage Party since 1988, and describes it as the "only party that expresses the views I hold as a Christian" (Hamilton Spectator, 16 November 2000). He was assistant manager of the Scottish Rite Club during the 2000 election (Spectator, 16 December 2000), and has worked as a bookkeeper and manager for two other clubs in the city. Since June 2003, Downey has been the CHP's executive director at the national office in Ottawa. He is a member of Bethel Gospel Tabernacle and stressed his opposition to abortion and same-sex marriage in the 2006 campaign (Spectator, 16 January 2006).

Electoral record
| Election | Division | Party | Votes | % | Place | Winner |
|---|---|---|---|---|---|---|
| 2000 federal | Hamilton West | N/A [CHP] | 163 | | 7/10 | Stan Keyes, Liberal |
| 2004 federal | Hamilton Centre | CHP | 520 | 1.17 | 5/7 | David Christopherson, New Democratic Party |
| 2006 federal | Hamilton Mountain | CHP | 458 | | 5/6 | Chris Charlton, New Democratic Party |

=== David W. Bylsma (Niagara West—Glanbrook) ===
See here for full details. He has been a candidate for the Christian Heritage Party in six elections.

=== Bill Bylsma (St. Catharines) ===
Bylsma moved to Canada in 1951, as an immigrant from the Netherlands. He is a retired welder and marine steel fitter. He joined the CHP in 1988, has chaired the CHP St. Catharines Electoral District Association for several years, and is active with the CHP's Right To Life organization. He received 481 votes (0.83%), finishing fifth against Conservative candidate Rick Dykstra. His wife Tilly and son David have also campaigned for the CHP.

=== Peter Vander Zaag (Simcoe—Grey) ===
Dr. Vander Zaag was born as raised in Alliston, Ontario. He is a farmer and scientist, and has worked extensively in international development programs on food production and related issues. Since the 1970s, he has been involved with the Canadian International Development Agency (CIDA) in places such as Bangladesh, Rwanda and Vietnam. From 1982 to 1990, he was director of the International Potato Center in Southeast Asia (Tulsa Tribune, 26 December 1991).

In the 2006 campaign, Vander Zaag has criticized the Canadian government for cutting back on aid to developing nations as well as for promoting liberal social values. Notwithstanding their divergent views on social issues, Vander Zaag has praised Stephen Lewis as the only "bright light for Canada's image in Africa".

Locally, he was chair of the Alliston Community Christian School for six years and served on the executive of the Christian Farmers Federation of Ontario for five years. He lives in Essa Township, and is a member of the Alliston Christian Reform Church. Vander Zaag developed a successful potato breeding operation in the 1990s and 2000s, creating chip potato varieties that can be stored for longer periods than standard potatoes.

He first contested Simcoe—Grey for the CHP in the 2004 federal election, and received one of the best results for the party anywhere in the country.

Electoral record
| Election | Division | Party | Votes | % | Place | Winner |
|---|---|---|---|---|---|---|
| 2004 federal | Simcoe—Grey | CHP | 2,285 | 4.13 | 5/5 | Helena Guergis, Conservative |
| 2006 federal | Simcoe—Grey | CHP | 1,585 | 2.62 | 5/5 | Helena Guergis, Conservative |

=== Carol Ann Krusky (Wellington—Halton Hills) ===
Krusky (born in Guelph) holds a Bachelor of Arts degree from Wilfrid Laurier University, and has taken courses at Guelph Business College. She operates a health and safety consultancy business with her husband, and has worked for the organization Women in Crisis. She has also provided assistance to pregnant youth and developmentally disabled children. She received 606 votes (1.10%), finishing fifth against Conservative incumbent Michael Chong.

== Saskatchewan ==
=== Dale Sanders (Saskatoon—Wanuskewin) ===
Sanders (born 1969 in Saskatoon) holds a diploma in chemical technology from Kelsey SIAST. He began working at Weyerhaeuser in the mid-1990s, was a Laboratory Technologist at the time of the 2006 election. He received 307 votes (0.85%), finishing fifth against Conservative incumbent Maurice Vellacott.

Vellacott is a staunch social conservative, and holds many policy views similar to those of the CHP. He held a telephone conversation with Sanders during the election and, according to Sanders, indicated that vote-splitting with the Conservatives would be "on the conscience" of the CHP candidate if it led to a Liberal victory. Sanders described this as subtle intimidation, although Vellacott denied this was his intent. Sanders also argued that he could not support the Conservative Party as he had in the past, as it was not presenting a coherent policy on social issues (Saskatoon Star-Phoenix, 9 January 2006).

== Other candidates (detailed entry not prepared) ==
Marcel Bourassa (Saskatoon-Rosetown-Biggar, Sask.)

Carson Chisholm (Stormont-Dundas-South Glengarry, Ontario)

Gary De Boer (Sarnia-Lambton, Ontario) (also ran 2004)

Irma DeVries (Perth-Wellington, Ontario) (also ran 2004)

Ken De Vries (Elgin-Middlesex-London, Ontario) (also ran 2004, 2000, 1997, 1993)

Steven Elgersma (Haldimand-Norfolk, Ontario) (also ran 2004)

Ron Gray, leader (Chilliwack-Fraser Canyon, B.C.) (also ran 2004, 2000, 1997, 1988, and in byelections May 2003, May 2002, Nov 1999, Mar 1996)

Vicki Gunn (York-Simcoe, Ontario) (also ran 2004)

James "Jim" Hnatiuk (South Shore-St. Margaret's, Nova Scotia) (also ran 2004)

Mike Janssens (Lambton-Kent-Middlesex, Ontario)

Stefan Jetchick (Louis-Hebert, Quebec)

Dave Joslin (Huron-Bruce, Ontario) (also ran 2004, 2000, 1997)

W. Baird Judson (Charlottetown, P.E.I.) (also ran 2004, 2000, 1997, 1993, 1988)

Christopher S. M. Kempling (Cariboo—Prince George, B.C.)

Adrian Peter Kooger (Simcoe North, Ontario) (also ran 2004, 2000)

John Markus (Oxford, Ontario)

Kevin Norng (Ajax-Pickering, Ontario)

Joe Pal (Vancouver Centre, B.C.) (also ran 2004, 1997)

Kevin Pielak (Surrey North, B.C.)

Irma Ruiter (Welland, Ontario) (also ran 2004)

Marc Slingerland (Lethbridge, Alberta)

Blaine William Stephan (Vegreville-Wainwright, Alberta)

Harold Stephan (Battlefords-Lloydminster, Saskatchewan) (also ran 2004)

Rod Taylor (Skeena-Bulkley Valley, B.C.) (also ran 2004)

Frank Wagner (Nanaimo-Alberni, B.C.) (also ran 2004, 2000)

John Wierenga (Yellowhead, Alberta)

Sally Wong (Mississauga East-Cooksville, Ontario) (also ran 2004)

John H. Wubs (Brant, Ontario) (also ran in 2004)

Iris Yawney (Dauphin-Swan River-Marquette, Manitoba)

Henry Zekveld (Durham, Ontario)

Previous runs for a candidate were not necessarily in a riding of the same name.
