= West River Station, Nova Scotia =

Community in Nova Scotia, Canada

Coordinates: 45°26′51″N 62°54′33″W

West River Station in Nova Scotia

West River Station is a community in the Canadian province of Nova Scotia, located in Pictou County.
