= Rick Casson =

Canadian politician

The Honourable Richard L. Casson PC

Member of Parliament for Lethbridge
- In office June 2, 1997 – May 2, 2011
- Preceded by: Ray Speaker
- Succeeded by: Jim Hillyer

Chair of the Standing Committee on National Defence
- In office May 9, 2006 – March 8, 2009
- Minister: Peter Mackay
- Preceded by: John Cannis
- Succeeded by: Maxime Bernier

Personal details
- Born: December 30, 1948 (age 77) Calgary, Alberta
- Party: Conservative
- Spouse: Jeanene Casson
- Profession: Printer

Richard L. Casson PC (born December 30, 1948, in Calgary, Alberta) is a Canadian politician. Casson was a member of the Conservative Party of Canada in the House of Commons of Canada, representing the riding of Lethbridge from 1997 to 2011.

== Before politics ==
Casson is a former manager of printing services. Casson was mayor of Picture Butte, Alberta from 1986 to 1995 and a councillor before that.

== Entrance to politics ==
In the 1997 federal election Casson received 55.5% of the popular vote. He went on to receive 66% in the 2000 election, 63% support in the 2004 election and 67.3% in the 2006 election.

He has been a member of the Canadian Alliance (2000–2003) and the Reform Party of Canada (1997–2000). Casson was the Chairman of the Standing Committee on National Defence and Co-Chair - Permanent Joint Board on Defence.

In 2003, Rick Casson supported the Iraq war, and in spring 2006 voted yes to the extension of Canadian military deployment in Afghanistan to 2009.

On January 7, 2010, Casson announced that he would not be running in the next election, which was held on May 2, 2011.

On October 1, 2010, he was appointed to the Queen's Privy Council for Canada in recognition of "many years of dedication and hard work in the House of Commons, including on Canada’s engagement in Afghanistan".
