= Blaine Thacker =

Canadian politician (1941–2020)

Blaine Allen Thacker

Member of the Canadian Parliament for Lethbridge Lethbridge-Foothills from 1979-1987
- In office 1979–1993
- Preceded by: Kenneth Earl Hurlburt
- Succeeded by: Raymond Speaker

Personal details
- Born: January 11, 1941 Taber, Alberta
- Died: February 17, 2020 (aged 79)
- Party: Progressive Conservative
- Portfolio: Parliamentary Secretary to the Minister of Transport (1987–1989); Parliamentary Secretary to the Minister of Consumer and Corporate Affairs (1989–1991); Parliamentary Secretary to the Minister of State (Agriculture) (1991)

Blaine Allen Thacker QC, (January 11, 1941 – February 17, 2020) was a Member of Parliament in the Lethbridge riding from 1979 to 1993 (Elected to the House of Commons in 1979, 1980, 1984 & 1988 for a total of 5,270 days).

Thacker received a Bachelor of Science in Agriculture in 1964 and a Bachelor of Law from the University of Alberta in 1968. He began his law career as a lawyer in Lethbridge, Alberta, with Virtue & Co., later becoming a partner in the firm. His work focused on criminal and civil litigation, commercial contracts, farm practice, real estate, and wills and estates.

During his 14 years in Parliament, he held several positions. From 1987 to 1989, he served as parliamentary secretary to the Minister of Consumer and Corporate Affairs, and from 1987 to 1991 as parliamentary secretary to the Minister of Transport. He was later appointed parliamentary secretary to the Minister of State for Agriculture. He also served as chair of the Standing Committee on Justice and Solicitor General, the Special Committee on Access to Information, and the Special Committee on the Canadian Security Intelligence Service. Among his contributions, the Blood Band irrigation project and the Animal Disease Research Institute—now the National Centre for Animal Diseases in Lethbridge—are regarded as notable aspects of his parliamentary legacy.

After his political career, Thacker returned to practicing law and was appointed Queen's Counsel in 1993. In 2006, he received an honorary Doctor of Laws from the University of Lethbridge. He served as a Chair of the university's Board of Governors from 1974 to 1978.

Following his death in 2020, the Blaine Thacker Memorial Award was established at the University of Lethbridge to support graduate students in agricultural research.
