= Sublett, Idaho =

Unincorporated community in Cassia County, Idaho, United States

- Unincorporated community
- Location in Idaho Location in the United States
- Coordinates: 42°18′44″N 113°8′13″W
- Country: United States
- State: Idaho
- County: Cassia
- Elevation: 5,007 ft (1,526 m)
- Time zone: UTC-7 (Mountain (MST))
  - Summer (DST): UTC-6 (MDT)
- ZIP code: 83342
- Area codes: 208, 986
- GNIS feature ID: 398195

Sublett is an unincorporated community in Cassia County, Idaho, United States, about 12 miles (19 km) east of Malta.
