= Christian Heritage Party of Canada candidates in multiple elections =

The following article is a list of people who have contested several elections for the Christian Heritage Party of Canada, but whose personal biography is otherwise too short to merit a separate article. It eliminates redundant references under each year's list of party candidates.

== Colin George Atkins ==
Colin George Atkins is a political activist in Manitoba, Canada. He is a leading figure in the province's Christian Heritage Party organization, having run for the party on four occasions. He has also campaigned for provincial office in Manitoba as an independent candidate.

Atkins was born in Leeds, England on June 24, 1931, and moved to Canada in 1952. He now lives in Souris, Manitoba. Now retired, he has been involved with the CHP since 1987, and was the President of its Manitoba organization for three years.

Electoral Record
| Election | Division | Party | Votes | % | Place | Winner |
| 2007 Manitoba Provincial Election | Minnedosa | Independent | 70 | 1.00 | 5/5 | Leanne Rowat, Progressive Conservative |
| 2006 Federal Election | Brandon—Souris | CHP | 290 | 0.78 | 6/7 | Merv Tweed, Conservative |
| 2004 Federal Election | Brandon—Souris | CHP | 351 | 1.00 | 5/6 | Merv Tweed, Conservative |
| 2003 Manitoba Provincial Election | Minnedosa | Independent | 106 | 1.54 | 4/4 | Leanne Rowat, Progressive Conservative |
| 2000 Federal Election | Brandon—Souris | Independent | 94 | 0.26 | 6/6 | Rick Borotsik, Progressive Conservative |
| 1997 Federal Election | Brandon—Souris | CHP | 229 | 0.62 | 6/6 | Rick Borotsik, Progressive Conservative |

== Jean Blaquière ==
(Party Leader, 1994–1995)

Jean Blaquière was a candidate twice for the CHP. He ran in the 1993 general election, was elected as the party's leader in March 1994, ran in the February 1995 byelection in Brome—Missisquoi, described as Quebec's closest analogue to a "Bible belt", and stepped down from the leadership in November 1995.

== Durk Bruinsma ==
Durk Bruinsma is a Canadian politician. He was a candidate for the Christian Heritage Party of Canada in four elections.

Electoral Record
| Election | Division | Party | Votes | % | Place | Winner |
| 2004 Federal Election | Clarington—Scugog—Uxbridge | CHP | 915 | 1.8% | 5/5 | Bev Oda, Conservative |
| 2000 Federal Election | Durham | Independent | 326 | 0.7% | 5/5 | Alex Shepherd, Liberal |
| 1997 Federal Election | Durham | CHP | 682 | 1.5% | 5/5 | Alex Shepherd, Liberal |
| 1993 Federal Election | Durham | CHP | 705 | 1.2% | 6/8 | Alex Shepherd, Liberal |

== David W. Bylsma ==
David W. Bylsma was born in St. Catharines, Ontario in 1970. He graduated from McMaster University with a degree in civil engineering, and operates a business manufacturing custom cabinet doors. He is a member and full-time organist with the Living Hope Orthodox Presbyterian Church. Bylsma has previously stated an opposition to abortion and support for restoring the death penalty. His father Bill Bylsma stood as a candidate for the party, while his mother, Tilly Bylsma stood as a CHP-affiliated independent candidate in 2000 when the party briefly lost its registration.

He is a perennial candidate for the Christian Heritage Party, having campaigned for the party in every federal election from 1993 to 2011. As of 2005, he has served as the national president of the CHP. Bylsma has also been involved with the Family Coalition Party at the provincial level, although he has not campaigned as a candidate.

In 2018, Bylsma won the West Lincoln mayoral election. His tenure as mayor was marred by controversy, as Bylsma made disparaging comments about LGBTQ, Black, and Indigenous people. During the COVID-19 pandemic, Bylsma attended anti-lockdown events and mocked public health measures such as wearing masks and engaging in social distancing. Bylsma ran for re-election in 2022 and placed a distant second behind Councillor Cheryl Ganann.

Electoral Record
| Election | Division | Party | Votes | % | Place | Winner |
| 2022 West Lincoln, Ontario Municipal Election | Mayor | non-partisan election | 1,484 | 26.9% | 2/3 | Cheryl Ganann |
| 2018 West Lincoln, Ontario Municipal Election | Mayor | non-partisan election | 2,115 | 48.38% | 1/4 | David W. Bylsma |
| 2011 Federal Election | St. Catharines | CHP | 357 | 0.71% | 5/6 | Rick Dykstra, Conservative |
| 2008 Federal Election | Niagara West—Glanbrook | CHP | 1,118 | 2.07% | 5/5 | Dean Allison, Conservative |
| 2006 Federal Election | Niagara West—Glanbrook | CHP | 1,132 | 2.0% | 5/5 | Dean Allison, Conservative |
| 2004 Federal Election | Niagara West—Glanbrook | CHP | 1,141 | 2.2% | 5/6 | Dean Allison, Conservative |
| 2000 Federal Election | Erie-Lincoln | Independent | 476 | 1.2% | 5/6 | John Maloney, Liberal |
| 1997 Federal Election | Niagara Centre | CHP | 515 | 1.1% | 5/7 | Gilbert Parent, Liberal |
| 1993 Federal Election | St. Catharines | CHP | 549 | 1.2% | 5/6 | Walt Lastewka, Liberal |

== Geoffrey Capp ==
Geoffrey Capp was born in 1959 in London, Ontario, Canada), he has run seven times for election in Canada, most of them federally in the Yukon for the Christian Heritage Party of Canada (CHP).

Capp had supported the Progressive Conservative Party from about 1977 to 1987, but abandoned it because of what he saw as scandals and financial incompetence of the Mulroney government. Capp ran for the CHP in the Yukon constituency in 1993, 1997, 2000, and 2004 and in the Lethbridge constituency in 2008, 2011, and 2015 elections. In 2000, the CHP was not a registered party and Capp was listed as having "no affiliation".

Capp also ran once for the Yukon Legislative Assembly. In the 2002 territorial election, Capp ran as one of two independent candidates in the McIntyre-Takhini riding, winning 15 votes (1.66% of the total) and losing to John Edzerza of the Yukon Party.

He is an Evangelical Christian and member of the Church of the Nazarene.

Electoral Record
| Election | Division | Party | Votes | % | Place | Winner |
| 2011 Federal Election | Lethbridge | CHP | 1,716 | 3.6% | 5/5 | Jim Hillyer, Conservative |
| 2008 Federal Election | Lethbridge | CHP | 1,091 | 2.3% | 5/5 | Rick Casson, Conservative |
| 2004 Federal Election | Yukon | CHP | 100 | 0.8% | 6/6 | Larry Bagnell, Liberal |
| 2002 Yukon Territorial Election | McIntyre-Takhini | Independent | 15 | 1.66% | 5/5 | John Edzerza, Yukon Party |
| 2000 Federal Election | Yukon | Independent | 53 | 0.4% | 5/5 | Larry Bagnell, Liberal |
| 1997 Federal Election | Yukon | CHP | 136 | 1.0% | 6/6 | Louise Hardy, New Democrat |
| 1993 Federal Election | Yukon | CHP | 61 | 0.4% | 6/6 | Audrey McLaughlin, New Democrat |

== Ken DeVries ==
Ken DeVries is a Canadian politician. He stood as a candidate for the CHP in five elections from 1993 to 2006, running in London West in 1993 and 1997, and in Elgin-Middlesex-London in 2000, 2004, and 2006.

Electoral Record
| Election | Division | Party | Votes | % | Place | Winner |
| 2006 Federal Election | Elgin-Middlesex-London | CHP | 1,049 | 2.0 | 5/7 | Joe Preston, Conservative |
| 2004 Federal Election | Elgin-Middlesex-London | CHP | 1,259 | 2.7 | 5/6 | Joe Preston, Conservative |
| 2000 Federal Election | Elgin-Middlesex-London | Independent | 407 | 1.0 | 6/6 | Gar Knutson Liberal |
| 1997 Federal Election | London North Centre | CHP | 375 | 0.8 | 6/8 | Joe Fontana Liberal |
| 1993 Federal Election | London West | CHP | 308 | 0.5 | 8/11 | Sue Barnes Liberal |

== Peter J. Ellis ==
Peter J. Ellis was born in England in 1939, and raised in Australia. He came to Canada in 1959, and returned to school in the same year. He holds a Bachelor of Theology degree from Toronto Bible College, a Bachelor of Arts degree in political science from Waterloo Lutheran University, and a Master of Arts degree in history from the University of Guelph. He worked as a career counsellor, real estate broker, and was part owner of Ursula's Travel Ltd., named for his wife. Ellis described himself as a conservative member of the Anglican Church of Canada.

Ellis was a perennial candidate for the Christian Heritage Party, having campaigned for the party on five occasions. In 1998, he was appointed as head of the party's Ontario council. In 2000, he drew parallels between the CHP and the Alliance, though he noted that the Alliance was a "secular" party and took issue with their lax stance on abortion and their focus on reducing taxes.

Electoral Record
| Election | Division | Party | Votes | % | Place | Winner |
| 2006 Federal Election | Guelph | CHP | 538 | | 5/7 | Brenda Chamberlain, Liberal |
| 2004 Federal Election | Guelph | CHP | 634 | | 5/7 | Brenda Chamberlain, Liberal |
| 2000 Federal Election | Waterloo—Wellington | Independent | 249 | 0.55 | 6/6 | Lynn Myers, Liberal |
| 1997 Federal Election | Guelph—Wellington | CHP | 972 | 1.86 | 5/7 | Brenda Chamberlain, Liberal |
| 1988 Federal Election | Guelph—Wellington | CHP | 1,978 | | 4/8 | William Winegard, Progressive Conservative |

== Jim Enos ==
Jim Enos, born in 1959, first became politically active in Hamilton after speaking out against a sex-ed video being shown in his son's Grade 6 class. By 2000, Enos had become the vice-president of the Hamilton-Wentworth Family Action Council, a socially-conservative, Christian organization that sought to change city and school board policies to focus on Christian morals. A prolific letter writer to the Hamilton Spectator, Enos has written about the social problems associated with common-law marriage, teaching about contraceptives in school, and what he called the "risky sexual behaviour" of gay people.

Enos and the Hamilton branch of the CHP were embroiled in a legal dispute with the city of Hamilton over transphobic ads the party sponsored in local bus shelters. The ads sought to influence city policy on allowing trans people to use the washroom of their choice by implying such a policy could help sexual predators. The ads were deemed offensive by the city and were removed, which prompted Enos and the local CHP to take the city to court. A judge later found in favour of the CHP and ordered the city to pay $44,000 to the party for legal costs.

Enos has run for office on nine occasions with the Family Coalition Party of Ontario at the provincial level, Christian Heritage Party of Canada at the federal level, and as an independent at all levels.

Electoral Record
| Election | Division | Party | Votes | % | Place | Winner |
| 2021 Federal Election | Hamilton Mountain | CHP | 336 | 0.70 | 6/6 | Lisa Hepfner, Liberal |
| 2019 Federal Election | Hamilton Mountain | CHP | 330 | 0.60 | 6/7 | Scott Duvall, NDP |
| 2018 Provincial Election | Hamilton West—Ancaster—Dundas | Independent | 247 | 0.45 | 7/7 | Sandy Shaw, Ontario NDP |
| 2015 Federal Election | Hamilton Mountain | CHP | 438 | 0.87 | 6/6 | Scott Duvall, NDP |
| 2011 Federal Election | Hamilton Mountain | CHP | 270 | .50 | 5/6 | Chris Charlton, NDP |
| 2011 Provincial Election | Hamilton Mountain | FCP | 450 | 0.99 | 5/7 | Monique Taylor, Ontario NDP |
| 2007 Provincial Election | Ancaster—Dundas—Flamborough—Westdale | FCP | 548 | 1.10 | 5/8 | Ted McMeekin, Ontario Liberal |
| 2003 Hamilton Municipal Election | Wards 11 and 12 Public School Trustee | non-partisan election | 3,031 | 33.78 | 2/3 | Ian Thompson |
| 1999 Provincial Election | Hamilton Mountain | FCP | 426 | 0.90 | 5/7 | Marie Bountrogianni, Ontario Liberal |

== Ron Gray ==
(Party Leader, 1995–2008)

Ron Gray has contested several elections and byelections for the Christian Heritage Party. Full details at a separate article.

== Larry R. Heather ==
Larry R. Heather has contested several elections and byelections for the Christian Heritage Party. Full details at a separate article.

== Jim Hnatiuk ==
Jim Hnatiuk served as the leader of the CHP from November, 2008 to February 2014. He is a Ukrainian-Canadian.

Electoral Record
| Election | Division | Party | Votes | % | Place | Winner |
| 2011 Federal Election | Cumberland-Colchester-Musquodoboit Valley | CHP | 375 | 0.93 | 5/5 | Scott Armstrong, Conservative |
| 2009 Federal By-Election | Cumberland-Colchester-Musquodoboit Valley | CHP | 776 | 3.2 | 5/6 | Scott Armstrong, Conservative |
| 2008 Federal Election | Kings-Hants | CHP | 528 | 1.4 | 5/5 | Scott Brison, Liberal |
| 2006 Federal Election | South Shore-St. Margaret's | CHP | 1,376 | 3.4 | 4/5 | Gerald Keddy, Conservative |
| 2004 Federal Election | Kings-Hants | CHP | 486 | 1.3 | 5/6 | Scott Brison, Liberal |

== Dave Joslin ==
Dave Joslin, born in 1954, is a welder-fitter. He lives in Grey Township, and is a member of the Bethel Free Reformed Church in Mitchell, Ontario. He opposes judicial activism, abortion, embryonic research, and hate-crimes legislation.

Electoral Record
| Election | Division | Party | Votes | % | Place | Winner |
| 2008 Federal Election | Huron—Bruce | CHP | 747 | 1.5% | 5/6 | Benjamin T. Lobb, Conservative |
| 2007 Provincial Election | Huron—Bruce | FCP | 1,035 | 2.32 | 5/7 | Carol Mitchell, Ontario Liberal |
| 2006 Federal Election | Huron—Bruce | CHP | 1,019 | 1.9 | 5/6 | Paul Steckle, Liberal |
| 2004 Federal Election | Huron—Bruce | CHP | 958 | | 5/6 | Paul Steckle, Liberal |
| 2003 Provincial Election | Huron—Bruce | FCP | 902 | 2.08 | 5/6 | Carol Mitchell, Ontario Liberal |
| 2000 Federal Election | Huron—Bruce | Independent | 429 | | 5/6 | Paul Steckle, Liberal |
| 1997 Federal Election | Huron—Bruce | CHP | 781 | | 5/5 | Paul Steckle, Liberal |

== Baird Judson ==
Baird Judson is a perennial candidate for the CHP. Judon ran in Prince Edward Island ridings in each election from the party's formation to 2011.

Electoral Record
| Election | Division | Party | Votes | % | Place | Winner |
| 2011 Federal Election | Charlottetown | CHP | 87 | 0.47% | 5/5 | Sean Casey, Liberal |
| 2008 Federal Election | Charlottetown | CHP | 124 | 0.7% | 5/5 | Shawn Murphy, Liberal |
| 2006 Federal Election | Charlottetown | CHP | 97 | 0.5% | 6/6 | Shawn Murphy, Liberal |
| 2004 Federal Election | Charlottetown | CHP | 105 | 0.6% | 5/5 | Shawn Murphy, Liberal |
| 2000 Federal Election | Hillsborough | Independent | 58 | 0.3% | 6/6 | Shawn Murphy, Liberal |
| 1997 Federal Election | Hillsborough | CHP | 145 | 0.8% | 5/6 | George Proud, Liberal |
| 1993 Federal Election | Hillsborough | CHP | 169 | 0.85% | 6/7 | George Proud, Liberal |
| 1988 Federal Election | Hillsborough | CHP | 281 | 1.4% | 5/5 | George Proud, Liberal |

== Harold John Ludwig ==
Harold John Ludwig is a Canadian politician who was a candidate for the CHP in the British Columbia interior from 1997 to 2008.

Electoral Record
| Election | Division | Party | Votes | % | Place | Winner |
| 2008 Federal Election | Chilliwack-Fraser Canyon | CHP | 653 | 1.4% | 5/6 | Chuck Strahl, Conservative |
| 2004 Federal Election | Abbotsford | CHP | 585 | 1.2% | 5/7 | Randy White, Conservative |
| 2000 Federal Election | Langley-Abbotsford | Independent | 420 | 0.76% | 5/5 | Randy White, Canadian Alliance |
| 1997 Federal Election | Langley-Abbotsford | CHP | 495 | 1.0% | 6/7 | Randy White, Reform |

== Terry M. Marshall ==
Terry M. Marshall was born in Kingston in 1960. He is a graduate of Frontenac Secondary School, and accepted a track scholarship to Morehead State University in Kentucky in 1979. He returned to Kingston following a conversion experience, and became an audio-visual repair technician after graduating from St. Lawrence College in 1983. He is a perennial candidate for the Christian Heritage Party, having campaigned for the party on multiple occasions. Marshall was endorsed by the Campaign Life Coalition in his first election as the only candidate in Kingston and the Islands to oppose abortion under all circumstances. In 1989, he was chosen as president of the CHP Kingston and the Islands Riding Association. He is currently a member of Bayridge Alliance Church.

In late 2005, Marshall announced that the CHP would not field a candidate in Kingston and the Islands for the 2006 election. The party has not contested the seat since 2004.

Electoral Record
| Election | Division | Party | Votes | % | Place | Winner |
| 2004 Federal Election | Kingston and the Islands | CHP | 481 | 0.88 | 5/8 | Peter Milliken, Liberal |
| 1997 Federal Election | Kingston and the Islands | CHP | 751 | 1.45 | 6/6 | Peter Milliken, Liberal |
| 1993 Federal Election | Kingston and the Islands | CHP | 663 | 1.16 | 6/7 | Peter Milliken, Liberal |
| 1988 Federal Election | Kingston and the Islands | CHP | 1,646 | 2.89 | 4/5 | Peter Milliken, Liberal |

== David J. Reimer ==
David J. Reimer contested several elections for the CHP and briefly served as interim leader of the party from March 2014 to November 2014.

Electoral Record
| Election | Division | Party | Votes | % | Place | Winner |
| 2014 Federal By-Election | Macleod | CHP | 774 | 4.24 | 4/5 | John Barlow, Conservative Party |
| 2011 Federal Election | Provencher | CHP | 510 | 1.29 | 5/6 | Vic Toews, Conservative Party |
| 2008 Federal Election | Provencher | CHP | 1,170 | 3.24 | 5/5 | Vic Toews, Conservative Party |
| 2006 Federal Election | Portage—Lisgar | CHP | 987 | 2.7 | 5/5 | Brian Pallister, Conservative Party |
| 2004 Federal Election | Portage—Lisgar | CHP | 1,458 | 4.2 | 4/6 | Brian Pallister, Conservative Party |
| 1997 Federal Election | Winnipeg North—St. Paul | CHP | 442 | | 5/6 | Rey Pagtakhan, Liberal |

== Robert Scott ==
Robert Scott has a Bachelor of Arts degree (1973) and a certificate of education (1974) from the University of Manitoba. He worked as a teacher and social counsellor with the Department of Indian Affairs, and later became a locomotive engineer with the Canadian National Railway. He is a retired member of the Royal Canadian Navy Reserves, with a rank of Chief Petty Officer 2nd Class. Scott joined the Christian Heritage Party in 1988, and served as the president of the party's Manitoba branch. Once active in the Roman Catholic church, he reaffiliated with the Shalom Family Worship Centre.

Electoral Record
| Election | Division | Party | Votes | % | Place | Winner |
| 2008 Federal Election | Elmwood—Transcona | CHP | 312 | 1.0 | 5/5 | Jim Maloway, New Democratic Party |
| 2006 Federal Election | Elmwood—Transcona | CHP | 363 | 1.09 | 5/5 | Bill Blaikie, New Democratic Party |
| 2004 Federal Election | Elmwood—Transcona | CHP | 386 | 1.32 | 5/7 | Bill Blaikie, New Democratic Party |
| 2000 Federal Election | Winnipeg—Transcona | Independent | 146 | 0.45 | 6/8 | Bill Blaikie, New Democratic Party |
| 1997 Federal Election | Winnipeg—Transcona | CHP | 423 | 1.28 | 5/7 | Bill Blaikie, New Democratic Party |
| 1993 Federal Election | Winnipeg—Transcona | CHP | 362 | 0.88 | 6/9 | Bill Blaikie, New Democratic Party |

== Rod Taylor ==
Rod Taylor is the current leader of the party.

Electoral record
| Election | Division | Party | Votes | % | Place | Winner |
| 2021 Federal Election | Skeena—Bulkley Valley | CHP | 797 | 2.1 | 6/6 | Taylor Bachrach, New Democratic Party |
| 2020 Provincial Election | Stikine | CHP | 831 | 11.49 | 3/4 | Nathan Cullen, New Democratic Party |
| 2019 Federal Election | Skeena—Bulkley Valley | CHP | 1,350 | 3.3 | 5/8 | Taylor Bachrach, New Democratic Party |
| 2017 Provincial Election | Stikine | CHP | 834 | 9.15 | 3/3 | Doug Donaldson, New Democratic Party |
| 2013 Provincial Election | Stikine | CHP | 485 | 5.93 | 4/6 | Doug Donaldson, New Democratic Party |

== Laura-Lynn Thompson ==
Laura-Lynn Thompson was the leader of the provincial CHP.

Electoral record
| Election | Division | Party | Votes | % | Place | Winner |
| 2020 Provincial Election | Abbotsford South | CHP | 1,720 | 7.90 | 4/4 | Bruce Banman, Liberal Party |
| 2019 by-election | Burnaby South | PPC | 2,422 | 10.65 | 4/6 | Jagmeet Singh, New Democratic Party |
| 2018 Burnaby School Trustee Election | At-large | Non-partisan election | 15,622 | 31.26 | 12/14 | Multiple |

== Eric Truijen ==
Eric Truijen has a high-school education. He was employed as a trucker from 1979 and 1991, when he became a professional firefighter in the city of Winnipeg He and his wife have hosted international students at their house, and he has worked with the Habitat project to construct inner-city homes.

Truijen wrote a letter to the Winnipeg Free Press newspaper in 1994, criticizing federal Minister of Justice Allan Rock for adding sexual orientation as a protected category under the Canadian Human Rights Act. He wrote that Rock was "wasting its precious time and our money to do this", and stated that "people who choose a perverted sexuality" were "already fully protected under the charter".

Electoral Record
| Election | Division | Party | Votes | % | Place | Winner |
| 2010 Federal By-Election | Winnipeg North | CHP | 46 | 0.29 | 7/7 | Kevin Lamoureux, Liberal Party |
| 2006 Federal Election | Winnipeg North | CHP | 207 | 0.76 | 5/6 | Judy Wasylycia-Leis, New Democratic Party |
| 2004 Federal Election | Winnipeg North | CHP | 141 | 0.54 | 5/6 | Judy Wasylycia-Leis, New Democratic Party |
| 2000 Federal Election | Winnipeg North—St. Paul | Independent | 126 | | 7/8 | Rey Pagtakhan, Liberal |
| 1993 Federal Election | Selkirk—Red River | CHP | 400 | | 6/8 | Ron Fewchuk, Liberal |

== Edward Vanwoudenberg ==
(Party Leader, 1987–1991)

See full article here.

== Frank Wagner ==
Frank Wagner has been a candidate for the Christian Heritage Party of Canada in four elections.

Electoral Record
| Election | Division | Party | Votes | % | Place | Winner |
| 2008 Federal Election | Nanaimo-Alberni | CHP | 186 | 0.3% | 5/6 | James Lunney, Conservative |
| 2006 Federal Election | Nanaimo-Alberni | CHP | 136 | 0.2% | 6/8 | James Lunney, Conservative |
| 2004 Federal Election | Vancouver South | CHP | 339 | 0.8% | 5/9 | Ujjal Dosanjh, Liberal |
| 2000 Federal Election | Delta-South Richmond | Independent | 225 | 0.4% | 6/6 | John Cummins, Canadian Alliance |
