= Heather Stilwell =

Heather Stilwell (January 26, 1944 – December 4, 2010) was a Canadian political activist and former school trustee in Surrey, British Columbia. A staunch Roman Catholic, she was well known for her opinions opposing homosexuality, abortion, and sex education.

She and her husband Bill were involved in the creation of the Christian Heritage Party in 1984 after a dozen or so people discussed the concept of such a party, which was registered with Elections Canada in June 1986.

From April 1993 to March 1994 she was the interim leader of the party and ran in the 1993 federal election in the riding of Surrey—White Rock—South Langley. One of the most contentious policies of the Christian Heritage Party Policy is Section 6.4.3. which states: "Concerning the welfare of this Nation's citizens, we favour recriminalizing in the Criminal Code of Canada the murder of pre-born children, sexual deviancy, and pornography." She entered the leadership race for the CHP at the 1994 convention, but withdrew and instead ran for the party presidency.

Heather Stilwell was also executive vice-president and leader of the socially conservative Family Coalition Party of British Columbia which later merged into the British Columbia Unity Party. Stilwell ran unsuccessfully in the 2001 provincial election, as a candidate in the riding of Surrey-Panorama Ridge.

She was a national board member and Western Regional Coordinator for the anti-abortion group Campaign Life Coalition, which strongly opposed what she referred to as "special rights for homosexuals".

She was President of the Alliance for Life, a national anti-abortion group based in Winnipeg, Manitoba and one-time President of the Surrey-Delta Pro-Life Association, the Pro-life Society of British Columbia, the Surrey-Delta Alliance For Life and the federal (Canadian) Alliance for Life. She was a member of the socially conservative lobby group REAL Women of Canada.

As co-founder of the publicly funded Surrey Traditional School in 1994, Stilwell played a key role in objecting to library books that offended her Christian beliefs. These books were temporarily banned as they dealt with topics such as Halloween, the Wicca religion and native-Indian spirituality. After pressure from the public, the school board allowed these books back into the library.

Stilwell became a member and eventual chair of the Surrey School Board. She voted to ban sex education and condom machines in Surrey schools. In 1997 she also voted, along with the majority of the school board, that three books dealing with families where both parents were of the same sex not be included as optional learning resources. These books were requested by a kindergarten teacher to teach his pupils about diversity and tolerance.

A legal battle to overturn the decision to ban the three books went all the way to the Supreme Court of Canada, where the school board's decision was overturned in 2002.

The judgement in the case cited the need for families headed by same-sex couples to be respected. Chief Justice Beverley McLachlin dismissed the board's concerns that children would be confused or misled by classroom information about same-sex parents. She said that the children of same-sex parents are rubbing shoulders with children from more traditional families and wrote: "Tolerance is always age-appropriate, children cannot learn unless they are exposed to views that differ from those they are taught at home." The legal fees ended up costing Surrey taxpayers over $1,200,000. Stilwell ran as an independent candidate for the School Board in the Surrey municipal election held November 19, 2005, and won re-election.

In May 2007 Stilwell proposed a motion to ensure that if the film An Inconvenient Truth, about global warming, were used as a resource in the Surrey School District, other resources which give an opposing view would also be used. This motion was unanimously passed by other members of the Board of Education. An article on the CBC website has quoted her on An Inconvenient Truth: "I think there is climate change, there's no question about that. Whether what Al Gore says about it is the truth, I have questions."

== Death ==
In 2008, she resigned from the school board when she was diagnosed with breast cancer. She died from the cancer on December 4, 2010, aged 66.

Electoral record
Election	Division	Party	Votes	%	Place	Winner
1993 federal	Surrey—White Rock—South Langley	CHP	871	1.2%	6/12	Val Meredith Reform

Preceded by Charles Cavilla	Christian Heritage Party of Canada leaders 1993-1994	Succeeded by Jean Blaquière
