= Christian Heritage Party of Canada =

Federal political party

Christian Heritage Party of Canada Parti de l'héritage chrétien du Canada
- Active federal party
- Leader: Rod Taylor
- President: Jerome Dondo
- Deputy leader: David Bylsma
- Founded: 1987
- Headquarters: Ottawa, Ontario
- Membership (2015): 6,000
- Ideology: Christian right; Christian democracy; Social conservatism
- Political position: Right-wing
- Colours: Burgundy
- Senate: 0 / 105
- House of Commons: 0 / 343

Website
- www.chp.ca

The Christian Heritage Party of Canada (French: Parti de l'héritage chrétien du Canada), also known as CHP Canada, is a Canadian federal political party that is part of the Christian right. Founded in 1987, it was the brainchild of two couples in British Columbia, namely Bill and Heather Stilwell, who were Roman Catholics, and Ed Vanwoudenberg and his wife Audrey, Reformed Protestants. The party's stated principle is that "the purpose of civil government is to ensure security, freedom, and justice for all its citizens from conception until natural death, by upholding just laws". CHP states that, if the party forms government, it hopes to "apply proven Judeo-Christian principles of justice and compassion to Canada's contemporary public policy needs".

Ed Vanwoudenberg was elected its first leader at the 1987 founding convention in Hamilton, Ontario. Jim Hnatiuk led the party from 2008 to early 2014, and Rod Taylor is the leader as of November 7, 2014.

The party nominated candidates for the first time in the 1988 federal election, and ran numerous candidates in the 1993 and 1997 elections. It was unable to field 50 candidates in the 2000 election; consequently, it was de-registered by Elections Canada, the government elections agency. The party was re-registered in time for the 2004 election. It has run candidates in every subsequent election to that.

Many of its founders had been members of the Social Credit movement. The majority of its members are Dutch Canadians who attend Dutch Reformed Churches.

== Party leaders ==
=== Edward John Vanwoudenberg (November 1987 – 1991) ===
Vanwoudenberg was head of the CHP from the party's founding convention in 1987 until 1991. From 1991 to 1994, he served as the Executive Director, and from 1994 to 1998, he served as the party's vice-president. A resident of Oliver, British Columbia, he ran in the Canadian federal elections of 1988, 1993 and 2000.

Electoral record
Election	Division	Party	Votes	%	Place	Winner
1988 federal	Fraser Valley West	CHP	2,428	4.7%	4/6	Robert L. Wenman Prog. Cons.
1993 federal	Fraser Valley West	CHP	1,028	1.7%	6/9	Randy White Reform
2000 federal	Fraser Valley	CHP	212	0.4%	8/9	Chuck Strahl Canadian Alliance

=== Charles Cavilla (1991–1993) ===
Cavilla, of Lethbridge, Alberta, was leader of the CHP from the convention at Ottawa in October 1991 until March 1993. A difference of vision on leadership between Cavilla and the party board resulted in the transfer of leadership on an interim basis to Heather Stilwell.

=== Jean Blaquière (1994–1995) ===
Blaquière, a Pentecostal pastor, was a candidate for the CHP in the Canadian federal election of 1993. In a race with two other contenders, Blaquière won the party leadership in March 1994 at a Vancouver convention. Blaquière stepped down at the next convention in November 1995 in London, Ontario.

=== Ron Gray (1995–2008) ===
Gray was the leader of the CHP from 1995 to 2008. Born and educated in British Columbia, Gray has worked in journalism, public relations, and the federal public service. He began his career at The Vancouver Sun newspaper, and has also worked at community newspapers in BC and in Suva, Fiji; and the BC Report magazine. He was a public information officer for a major public utility in BC, and for the Canadian Broadcasting Corporation.

He was a Trade and Commerce Officer attached to the Canadian Consulate in Cleveland, Ohio. He later managed store-front Federal government public information services in Winnipeg and Vancouver. He became Public Information Officer for one of BC's first community colleges, and later served 10 years in a similar capacity at Trinity Western University.

In the 1988 federal election, Gray ran in his first election under the Christian Heritage Party banner in the electoral district of Fraser Valley East. On election night, he placed fourth out of six candidates with over eight per cent of the popular vote, finishing well behind Progressive Conservative incumbent Ross Belsher.

Gray ran for the CHP in every general election until stepping down as leader in 2008, with the exception of 1993. He has also contested four byelections, including one in Calgary Southwest against Canadian Alliance leader Stephen Harper. In a 1999 byelection, he finished one vote ahead of the Reform Party candidate in the Quebec riding of Hull—Aylmer.

Gray became the party leader in 1995. His leadership was confirmed at three subsequent CHP conventions. He stepped down in November 2008. Near the end of 2006, a human rights complaint was filed against Ron Gray alleging communication via the Internet messages likely to expose homosexuals to hatred or contempt. By October 24, 2008, the complaint had been dropped and the file closed by the Canadian Human Rights Commission.

=== Jim Hnatiuk (2008–2014) ===
Hnatiuk was elected leader of the CHP in November 2008. As a youth, he attended a boarding school run by Oblate priests. He joined the Canadian Forces. Hnatiuk has served with them for 25 years in the Combat Systems Engineering Department in the Canadian Forces, attaining the rank of Chief Petty Officer 1st Class. He has been involved with various churches and is a deacon at Emmanuel Baptist Church.

Hnatiuk joined the Christian Heritage Party in 2002; he has run as a candidate for the party in Nova Scotia in the 2004, 2006 and 2008 federal elections.

Hnatiuk became deputy leader of the party in 2005 and was elected leader at the party's November 2008 convention in London, Ontario; he defeated Harold Ludwig and Rod Taylor on the first ballot of the party's leadership convention.

Hnatiuk was a candidate in the November 9, 2009 by-election in the riding of Cumberland—Colchester—Musquodoboit Valley, to replace independent Member of Parliament Bill Casey. He came in fifth, losing to Scott Armstrong of the Conservative Party of Canada.

Because of a difference in understanding on the leader's mandate to innovate in membership qualifications, and a motion by the national board to ask that the leader put promotion of his vision on hold until a full board meeting could discuss the vision, Hnatiuk submitted his resignation as leader effective February 1, 2014; he chose to continue as a party member.

In his professional life, he operated the largest hunting, fishing and taxidermy business in Nova Scotia.

=== David J. Reimer (March 2014 – November 2014) (interim) ===
David J. Reimer became a member of the CHP in 1987 while serving as a Pastor in Wetaskiwin, AB. He became active in his riding association and has served the party as candidate in each election since 1988. He served as candidate in the 2014 by-election in Macleod, Alberta.

Until early 2014, Reimer served as interim provincial president for Manitoba, and was appointed as interim national leader to succeed Hnatiuk until the fall 2014 national convention.

=== Rod Taylor (2014–present) ===
Rod Taylor was born in 1951 in Minneapolis, Minnesota. His family was involved in the US civil rights movement in the 1960s and various other social justice issues. He graduated from high school in California and moved with his parents and siblings to British Columbia (BC) in 1968.

Taylor has worked maintaining track and roadbed for the Canadian National Railway, on farms, in the oil and gas fields in Alberta, and in sawmills and forestry work in BC. From 1987 until 2009, Taylor was involved in lumber grading and lumber quality control in Smithers, BC. In 2000 Taylor won the BC Interior Lumber Grading Championship.

In 2001, Taylor ran as a provincial candidate for the British Columbia Unity Party, and in 2004, 2006 and 2008 he represented the CHP in the federal riding of Skeena-Bulkley Valley.

Taylor has served the CHP nationally as Interim President for CHP BC, BC Provincial President, Deputy Leader, Western Regional Development Director and National Development Director. He was named party leader at the 2014 convention in Hamilton, Ontario.

== Provincial branches ==
The British Columbia Heritage Party voted to become the BC provincial wing of CHP in 2011; the party was renamed as the Christian Heritage Party of British Columbia (CHP-BC) after signing a formal affiliation agreement in 2012. Members of the CHP in Manitoba began efforts around the same time to form a branch in their province, but as of 2015 little progress has been made.

While the parties were not formally connected, the membership of the deregistered provincial New Reform Party of Ontario (formerly the Family Coalition Party of Ontario) overlapped significantly with CHP as the parties shared many socially conservative policies. The same applied to the Family Coalition Party of British Columbia.

== Election results ==
View source data.

Election	Leader	Candidates	Votes	Share of popular vote	Share in ridings contested
1988	Ed Vanwoudenberg	63 / 295	102,533	0.78%	3.56%
1993	Heather Stilwell	58 / 295	30,455	0.22%	1.09%
1997	Ron Gray	53 / 301	29,085	0.22%	1.26%
2000	n/a†	46 / 301	10,110	0.08%	0.51%
2004	Ron Gray	62 / 308	40,335	0.30%	1.52%
2006	Ron Gray	45 / 308	28,152	0.19%	1.32%
2008	Ron Gray	59 / 308	26,475	0.19%	1.02%
2011	Jim Hnatiuk	46 / 308	18,910	0.13%	0.84%
2015	Rod Taylor	30 / 338	15,284	0.09%	0.97%
2019	Rod Taylor	51 / 338	18,816	0.11%	0.71%
2021	Rod Taylor	25 / 338	8,985	0.05%	0.67%
2025	Rod Taylor	32 / 343	10,063	0.05%	–

†The party did not have official status for the 2000 election, but 46 candidates were nominated, listed on the ballot without any affiliation information. These figures represent the 46 "non-affiliated" candidates known to be nominees of the CHP.

== See also ==
- Social conservatism in Canada
- Lists of candidates: 2015, 2011, 2008, 2006, 2004, 2000, 1997, 1993, 1988

== Bibliography ==
- Robert K. Burkinshaw. Pilgrims in Lotus Land: Conservative Protestantism in British Columbia 1917–1981 (Mcgill-Queen's Studies in the History of Religion, 1995)
- Paul Freston. Protestant political parties: a global survey (2004)
