= Lethbridge (federal electoral district) =

Federal electoral district in Alberta, Canada

Alberta electoral district
- Interactive map of riding boundaries from the 2015 federal election

Federal electoral district
- Legislature: House of Commons
MP
Rachael Thomas
Conservative
- District created: 1987
- First contested: 1988
- Last contested: 2025
- District webpage: profile, map

Demographics
- Population (2011): 105,999
- Electors (2019): 88,226
- Area (km²): 3,028
- Pop. density (per km²): 35
- Census division(s): Division No. 2, Division No. 3
- Census subdivision(s): Lethbridge, Lethbridge County, Coaldale, Coalhurst, Picture Butte, Nobleford, Barons

Lethbridge (formerly known as Lethbridge—Foothills) is a federal electoral district in Alberta, Canada, that has been represented in the House of Commons of Canada since 1917. It incorporates the City of Lethbridge and Lethbridge County.

Lethbridge has had a centre-right MP at the federal level since the 1930s. The current MP for Lethbridge is Rachael Thomas, who was first elected to parliament in 2015 for the Conservatives.

== History ==
This riding was originally created in 1914 from parts of Macleod riding.

In 1977, it was renamed "Lethbridge—Foothills".

In 1987, Lethbridge—Foothills was abolished and replaced by a new "Lethbridge" riding. The new riding was created from most of Lethbridge—Foothills, along with parts of Macleod and Medicine Hat ridings.

It has been represented by centre-right MPs without interruption since 1930. As in most other federal Alberta ridings outside of Calgary and Edmonton, it usually supports the major right-wing party of the day by landslide margins. Since 1945, a non-conservative party has only won 30 percent of the vote three times. Lethbridge itself is somewhat friendlier to centre-left candidates, at least at the provincial level, which helps reduce the overall margins compared to surrounding ridings. The Alberta New Democratic Party (NDP) won both seats in the provincial legislature from the city in the 2015 provincial election, but in 2019 lost the Lethbridge East riding to the United Conservative Party (UCP). The city has occasionally elected provincial Liberals in the past as well. At the federal level, however, the NDP and the Liberals are no match for the overwhelming conservative bent of the more rural areas.

This riding lost territory to Medicine Hat—Cardston—Warner and Foothills during the 2012 electoral redistribution.

=== Historical boundaries ===
1914 representation order

1924 representation order

1933 representation order

1952 representation order

1966 representation order

1976 representation order

1987 representation order

1996 representation order

2003 representation order

2013 representation order

=== Members of Parliament ===
Parliament	Years	Member	Party
Lethbridge; Riding created from Macleod
13th	1917–1921	William Ashbury Buchanan	Government (Unionist)
14th	1921–1925	Lincoln Henry Jelliff	Progressive
15th	1925–1926	Lincoln Henry Jelliff	Progressive
16th	1926–1930	Lincoln Henry Jelliff	United Farmers
17th	1930–1935	John Smith Stewart	Conservative
18th	1935–1940	John Horne Blackmore	Social Credit
19th	1940–1945	John Horne Blackmore	Social Credit
20th	1945–1949	John Horne Blackmore	Social Credit
21st	1949–1953	John Horne Blackmore	Social Credit
22nd	1953–1957	John Horne Blackmore	Social Credit
23rd	1957–1958	John Horne Blackmore	Social Credit
24th	1958–1962	Deane Gundlock	Progressive Conservative
25th	1962–1963	Deane Gundlock	Progressive Conservative
26th	1963–1965	Deane Gundlock	Progressive Conservative
27th	1965–1968	Deane Gundlock	Progressive Conservative
28th	1968–1972	Deane Gundlock	Progressive Conservative
29th	1972–1974	Kenneth Earl Hurlburt	Progressive Conservative
30th	1974–1979	Kenneth Earl Hurlburt	Progressive Conservative
Lethbridge—Foothills
31st	1979–1980	Blaine Thacker	Progressive Conservative
32nd	1980–1984	Blaine Thacker	Progressive Conservative
33rd	1984–1988	Blaine Thacker	Progressive Conservative
Lethbridge
34th	1988–1993	Blaine Thacker	Progressive Conservative
35th	1993–1997	Raymond Speaker	Reform
36th	1997–2000	Rick Casson	Reform
36th	2000–2000	Rick Casson	Alliance
37th	2000–2003	Rick Casson	Alliance
37th	2003–2004	Rick Casson	Conservative
38th	2004–2006	Rick Casson	Conservative
39th	2006–2008	Rick Casson	Conservative
40th	2008–2011	Rick Casson	Conservative
41st	2011–2015	Jim Hillyer	Conservative
42nd	2015–2019	Rachael Thomas	Conservative
43rd	2019–2021	Rachael Thomas	Conservative
44th	2021–2025	Rachael Thomas	Conservative
45th	2025–present	Rachael Thomas	Conservative

=== Current member of Parliament ===
Its member of Parliament is Rachael Thomas. She was first elected in 2015. She is a member of the Conservative Party of Canada.

== Demographics ==
Panethnic groups in Lethbridge (2011−2021)
Panethnic group	2021		2016		2011	
Panethnic group	Pop.	%	Pop.	%	Pop.	%
European (Note: Statistic includes all persons that did not make up part of a visible minority or an indigenous identity.)	96,470	80.06%	95,430	83.77%	90,940	88.48%
Indigenous	7,240	6.01%	6,135	5.39%	4,370	4.25%
East Asian (Note: Statistic includes total responses of "Chinese", "Korean", and "Japanese" under visible minority section on census.)	3,415	2.83%	3,030	2.66%	3,135	3.05%
Southeast Asian (Note: Statistic includes total responses of "Filipino" and "Southeast Asian" under visible minority section on census.)	3,220	2.67%	2,465	2.16%	1,210	1.18%
African	3,220	2.67%	1,925	1.69%	855	0.83%
South Asian	3,075	2.55%	2,135	1.87%	965	0.94%
Latin American	2,390	1.98%	1,665	1.46%	710	0.69%
Middle Eastern (Note: Statistic includes total responses of "West Asian" and "Arab" under visible minority section on census.)	755	0.63%	740	0.65%	235	0.23%
Other/multiracial (Note: Statistic includes total responses of "Visible minority, n.i.e." and "Multiple visible minorities" under visible minority section on census.)	725	0.6%	390	0.34%	365	0.36%
Total responses	120,500	97.3%	113,920	97.04%	102,780	96.96%
Total population	123,847	100%	117,394	100%	105,999	100%
Notes: Totals greater than 100% due to multiple origin responses. Demographics based on 2012 Canadian federal electoral redistribution riding boundaries.

== Election results ==
Graph of election results in Lethbridge (1914-1977), Lethbridge—Foothills, Lethbridge (1987-present) (minor parties that never got 2% of the vote or didn't run consistently are omitted)

=== Lethbridge, 1987–present ===
Graph of election results in Lethbridge (1987-present) (minor parties that never got 2% of the vote or didn't run consistently are omitted)

2025 Canadian federal election
Party	Candidate	Votes	%	±%	Expenditures
Conservative	Rachael Thomas	40,866	61.05	+5.40	$99,574.23
Liberal	Chris Spearman	21,899	32.72	+17.58	$84,698.36
New Democratic	Nathan Svoboda	2,431	3.63	–15.68	$10,506.53
Christian Heritage	Marc Slingerland	806	1.20	+0.24	$14,547.70
People's	Clara Piedalue	478	0.71	–6.24	$1,361.54
Green	Amber Murray	457	0.68	–	$620.19
Total valid votes/expense limit		66,937	99.64	–	$139,973.63
Total rejected ballots		240	0.36	–0.12	
Turnout		67,177	70.34	+5.11	
Eligible voters		95,504			
Conservative hold		Swing		+10.54	
Source: Elections Canada

2021 Canadian federal election
Party	Candidate	Votes	%	±%	Expenditures
Conservative	Rachael Thomas	32,817	55.65	–10.14	$70,783.74
New Democratic	Elaine Perez	11,386	19.31	+4.59	$649.51
Liberal	Devon Hargreaves	8,928	15.14	+1.50	$22,887.05
People's	Kimmie Hovan	4,097	6.95	+5.32	$3,238.34
Independent	Kim Siever	1,179	2.00	–	none listed
Christian Heritage	Geoffrey Capp	566	0.96	–0.12	$7,470.57
Total valid votes/expense limit		58,973	99.52	–	$118,112.55
Total rejected ballots		282	0.48	–0.06	
Turnout		59,255	65.23	–3.86	
Eligible voters		90,847			
Conservative hold		Swing		–7.36	
Source: Elections Canada

2019 Canadian federal election
Party	Candidate	Votes	%	±%	Expenditures
Conservative	Rachael Thomas	40,713	65.79	+9.03	$81,336.37
New Democratic	Shandi Bleiken	9,110	14.72	–5.78	$30,986.97
Liberal	Amy Bronson	8,443	13.64	–4.86	$38,096.11
Green	Stephnie Watson	1,939	3.13	+0.56	$1,233.16
People's	Grant Hepworth	1,007	1.63	–	none listed
Christian Heritage	Marc Slingerland	670	1.08	–0.23	$12,957.85
Total valid votes/expense limit		61,882	99.46	–	$113,789.66
Total rejected ballots		335	0.54	+0.26	
Turnout		62,217	69.09	+1.38	
Eligible voters		90,051			
Conservative hold		Swing		+7.42	
Source: Elections Canada

2015 Canadian federal election
Party	Candidate	Votes	%	±%	Expenditures
Conservative	Rachael Thomas	32,321	56.76	+4.25	$120,662.32
New Democratic	Cheryl Meheden	11,674	20.50	–9.45	$115,672.18
Liberal	Mike Pyne	10,532	18.50	+9.36	$34,405.68
Green	Kas MacMillan	1,461	2.57	–1.92	$2,377.70
Christian Heritage	Geoffrey Capp	746	1.31	–2.61	$14,002.87
Rhinoceros	Solly Krygier-Paine	209	0.37	–	none listed
Total valid votes/expense limit		56,943	99.72	–	$218,320.12
Total rejected ballots		158	0.28	–0.35	
Turnout		57,101	67.71	+13.96	
Eligible voters		84,335			
Conservative hold		Swing		+6.85	
Source: Elections Canada

2011 federal election redistributed results
Party	Vote	%
Conservative	21,617	52.51
New Democratic	12,329	29.95
Liberal	3,759	9.13
Green	1,845	4.48
Christian Heritage	1,614	3.92

2011 Canadian federal election
Party	Candidate	Votes	%	±%	Expenditures
Conservative	Jim Hillyer	27,173	56.51	–10.45	$72,812.23
New Democratic	Mark Sandilands	13,072	27.19	+12.97	$35,075.76
Liberal	Michael Joseph Cormican	4,030	8.38	–0.92	$23,463.00
Green	Cailin Bartlett	2,095	4.36	–2.86	none listed
Christian Heritage	Geoffrey Capp	1,716	3.57	+1.26	$12,190.33
Total valid votes/expense limit		48,086	99.37	–	$98,241.20
Total rejected ballots		307	0.63	+0.34	
Turnout		48,393	53.75	+0.46	
Eligible voters		90,036			
Conservative hold		Swing		–11.71	
Source: Elections Canada

2008 Canadian federal election
Party	Candidate	Votes	%	±%	Expenditures
Conservative	Rick Casson	31,714	66.96	–0.35	$78,290.23
New Democratic	Mark Sandilands	6,733	14.22	+0.52	$18,332.01
Liberal	Michael Joseph Cormican	4,404	9.30	–1.95	$21,306.56
Green	Amanda Swagar	3,420	7.22	+3.68	none listed
Christian Heritage	Geoffrey Capp	1,094	2.31	–0.49	$13,507.11
Total valid votes/expense limit		47,365	99.71	–	$94,223.14
Total rejected ballots		138	0.29	+0.04	
Turnout		47,503	53.29	–9.39	
Eligible voters		89,136			
Conservative hold		Swing		–0.43	
Source: Elections Canada

2006 Canadian federal election
Party	Candidate	Votes	%	±%	Expenditures
Conservative	Rick Casson	35,061	67.30	+4.68	$67,905.52
New Democratic	Melanee Thomas	7,135	13.70	+3.97	$14,042.63
Liberal	Michael Joseph Cormican	5,859	11.25	–10.32	$22,836.09
Green	Andrea Sheridan	1,846	3.54	+0.89	none listed
Christian Heritage	Marc Slingerland	1,458	2.80	+0.53	$23,744.16
Independent	Howard Forsyth	735	1.41	–	none listed
Total valid votes/expense limit		52,094	99.75	–	$85,277.89
Total rejected ballots		132	0.25	–0.03	
Turnout		52,226	62.68	+0.76	
Eligible voters		83,315			
Conservative hold		Swing		+7.50	
Source: Elections Canada

2004 Canadian federal election
Party	Candidate	Votes	%	±%	Expenditures
Conservative	Rick Casson	29,765	62.62	–12.23	$67,302.89
Liberal	Ken Nicol	10,250	21.56	+4.62	$34,027.15
New Democratic	Melanee Thomas	4,623	9.73	+3.97	$10,460.67
Green	Erin Marie Matthews	1,262	2.66	+0.78	$575.82
Christian Heritage	Ken Vanden Broek	1,079	2.27	–	$13,322.88
Marijuana	Dustin Sobie	553	1.16	–	none listed
Total valid votes/expense limit		47,532	99.72	–	$80,077.56
Total rejected ballots		135	0.28	–0.07	
Turnout		47,667	61.92	–0.01	
Eligible voters		76,987			
Conservative hold		Swing		–8.42	
Note:Conservative vote is compared to the total of Progressive Conservative and Canadian Alliance vote in 2000.
Source: Elections Canada

2000 Canadian federal election
Party	Candidate	Votes	%	±%	Expenditures
Alliance	Rick Casson	30,380	66.02	+10.49	$61,765
Liberal	Vaughan Hartigan	7,797	16.94	–2.24	$10,339
Progressive Conservative	Kimberly Denise Budd	4,062	8.83	–9.26	$3,506
New Democratic	Garth Hardy	2,648	5.76	+0.38	$6,135
Green	Donald Carvel Ferguson	864	1.88	–	$1,324
Canadian Action	Dan Lamden	264	0.57	–0.22	$739
Total valid votes		46,015	99.65		
Total rejected ballots		163	0.35	+0.16	
Turnout		46,178	61.93	+2.26	
Eligible voters		74,568			
Alliance hold		Swing		+6.37	
Note: Canadian Alliance vote is compared to the Reform vote in 1997.
Source: Elections Canada

1997 Canadian federal election
Party	Candidate	Votes	%	±%	Expenditures
Reform	Rick Casson	22,828	55.53	+2.90	$63,487
Liberal	John William McGee	7,887	19.19	–6.28	$47,656
Progressive Conservative	Greg Weadick	7,436	18.09	+2.87	$40,649
New Democratic	Victor Lough	2,211	5.38	+2.63	$3,877
Christian Heritage	Nellie Slingerland	418	1.02	–	$1,944
Canadian Action	J-C Lessard	326	0.79	–	$9,690
Total valid votes		41,106	99.81		
Total rejected ballots		79	0.19	–0.10	
Turnout		41,185	59.67	–6.04	
Eligible voters		69,023			
Reform hold		Swing		+4.59	
Source: Elections Canada

1993 Canadian federal election
Party	Candidate	Votes	%	±%
Reform	Raymond Speaker	24,530	52.63	+45.83
Liberal	John William McGee	11,870	25.47	+6.88
Progressive Conservative	Dean Lien	7,092	15.22	–43.19
National	Carson Tannant	1,586	3.40	–
New Democratic	Doug Petherbridge	1,283	2.75	–7.05
Natural Law	Cliff Kinzel	247	0.53	–
Total valid votes		46,608	99.71	
Total rejected ballots		136	0.29	+0.05
Turnout		46,744	65.71	–7.92
Eligible voters		71,132		
Reform gain from Progressive Conservative		Swing		–
Source: Elections Canada

1988 Canadian federal election
Party	Candidate	Votes	%	±%
Progressive Conservative	Blaine Thacker	26,750	58.41	–
Liberal	Robert Grbavac	8,513	18.59	–
New Democratic	Donald Ferguson	4,489	9.80	–
Reform	Phil Connolly	3,116	6.80	–
Christian Heritage	Charles Cavilla	2,932	6.40	–
Total valid votes		45,800	99.76	
Total rejected ballots		112	0.24	
Turnout		45,912	73.63	
Eligible voters		62,357		
Progressive Conservative hold		Swing		–
Source: Elections Canada

=== Lethbridge—Foothills, 1977–1987 ===
Graph of election results in Lethbridge—Foothills (minor parties that never got 2% of the vote or didn't run consistently are omitted)

1984 Canadian federal election: Lethbridge—Foothills
Party	Candidate	Votes	%	±%
Progressive Conservative	Blaine Thacker	31,316	67.38	–1.22
New Democratic	Connie Credico	6,822	14.68	+4.69
Liberal	Shaun G. Ward	5,315	11.44	–5.85
Independent	Steven V. Pinchak	2,145	4.62	+3.40
Social Credit	Rod W. Start	456	0.98	–1.61
Confederation of Regions	Cyril Baranosky	426	0.92	–
Total valid votes		46,480	99.71	
Total rejected ballots		134	0.29	–0.01
Turnout		46,614	66.51	+5.37
Eligible voters		70,090		
Progressive Conservative hold		Swing		–3.54
Source: Elections Canada

1980 Canadian federal election: Lethbridge—Foothills
Party	Candidate	Votes	%	±%
Progressive Conservative	Blaine Thacker	27,307	68.60	–1.30
Liberal	Shaun G. Ward	6,882	17.29	–0.37
New Democratic	Dave Porteous	3,974	9.98	+1.04
Social Credit	D. Willard Paxman	1,031	2.59	–0.49
Independent	Peter Jones	482	1.21	–
Communist	David Wallis	132	0.33	–0.09
Total valid votes		39,808	99.70	
Total rejected ballots		119	0.30	–0.15
Turnout		39,927	61.14	–6.94
Eligible voters		65,300		
Progressive Conservative hold		Swing		+0.83
Source: Elections Canada

1979 Canadian federal election: Lethbridge—Foothills
Party	Candidate	Votes	%	±%
Progressive Conservative	Blaine Thacker	29,069	69.89	+6.37
Liberal	Jim Gladstone	7,345	17.66	–4.15
New Democratic	Roger Rickwood	3,720	8.94	–1.32
Social Credit	Wagner Saende	1,282	3.08	–1.32
Communist	David Wallis	174	0.42	–
Total valid votes		41,590	99.55	
Total rejected ballots		190	0.45	+0.11
Turnout		41,780	68.08	+0.45
Eligible voters		61,369		
Progressive Conservative hold		Swing		+5.26
Source: Elections Canada

=== Lethbridge, 1914–1977 ===
Graph of election results in Lethbridge (1914-1977) (minor parties that never got 2% of the vote or didn't run consistently are omitted)

1974 Canadian federal election
Party	Candidate	Votes	%	±%
Progressive Conservative	Kenneth Earl Hurlburt	20,602	63.52	+5.72
Liberal	Sven Ericksen	7,075	21.81	–1.50
New Democratic	Bessie Annand	3,329	10.26	–1.82
Social Credit	Vern Young	1,428	4.40	–2.40
Total valid votes		32,434	99.66	
Total rejected ballots		111	0.34	–1.76
Turnout		32,545	67.63	–6.10
Eligible voters		48,125		
Progressive Conservative hold		Swing		+3.61
Source: Library of Parliament

1972 Canadian federal election
Party	Candidate	Votes	%	±%
Progressive Conservative	Kenneth Earl Hurlburt	18,845	57.80	+12.85
Liberal	Andy Russell	7,601	23.31	–7.63
New Democratic	Hal Hoffman	3,941	12.09	+2.86
Social Credit	Keith L. Hancock	2,219	6.81	–8.08
Total valid votes		32,606	97.90	
Total rejected ballots		701	2.10	+1.47
Turnout		33,307	73.73	+0.17
Eligible voters		45,173		
Progressive Conservative hold		Swing		+10.24
Source: Library of Parliament

1968 Canadian federal election
Party	Candidate	Votes	%	±%
Progressive Conservative	Deane Gundlock	11,901	44.95	+3.92
Liberal	John I. Boras	8,193	30.94	+11.21
Social Credit	Ernie Patterson	3,941	14.89	–17.59
New Democratic	George Edward Orchard	2,442	9.22	+2.46
Total valid votes		26,477	99.37	
Total rejected ballots		168	0.63	+0.06
Turnout		26,645	73.56	–2.93
Eligible voters		36,224		
Progressive Conservative hold		Swing		+10.76
Source: Library of Parliament

1965 Canadian federal election
Party	Candidate	Votes	%	±%
Progressive Conservative	Deane Gundlock	10,147	41.03	–2.28
Social Credit	Wallace C. Strom	8,032	32.47	–2.51
Liberal	Frank Sherring	4,882	19.74	+3.57
New Democratic	Frances Joyce Grantham	1,673	6.76	+1.95
Total valid votes		24,734	99.43	
Total rejected ballots		143	0.57	+0.02
Turnout		24,877	76.49	–4.56
Eligible voters		32,522		
Progressive Conservative hold		Swing		+2.39
Source: Library of Parliament

1963 Canadian federal election
Party	Candidate	Votes	%	±%
Progressive Conservative	Deane Gundlock	11,475	43.30	–0.77
Social Credit	Steve Kapcsos	9,271	34.99	+0.49
Liberal	Martin Hoyt	4,284	16.17	+1.90
New Democratic	Peter Uganecz	1,277	4.82	–2.35
Independent	John Arthur Spencer	193	0.73	–
Total valid votes		26,500	99.45	
Total rejected ballots		147	0.55	–0.43
Turnout		26,647	81.05	+2.42
Eligible voters		32,878		
Progressive Conservative hold		Swing		–0.63
Source: Library of Parliament

1962 Canadian federal election
Party	Candidate	Votes	%	±%
Progressive Conservative	Deane Gundlock	11,105	44.07	–14.26
Social Credit	Steve Kapcsos	8,693	34.50	+6.25
Liberal	Mark Reed Stringam	3,595	14.27	+2.42
New Democratic	Milo Douglas	1,806	7.17	–
Total valid votes		25,199	99.02	
Total rejected ballots		249	0.98	+0.15
Turnout		25,448	78.63	–1.68
Eligible voters		32,364		
Progressive Conservative hold		Swing		–10.26
Source: Library of Parliament

1958 Canadian federal election
Party	Candidate	Votes	%	±%
Progressive Conservative	Deane Gundlock	13,364	58.33	+43.56
Social Credit	John Horne Blackmore	6,471	28.25	–24.77
Liberal	Clarence G. Yanosik	2,714	11.85	–20.36
Independent Social Credit	Ervin D. Olsen	361	1.58	–
Total valid votes		22,910	99.17	
Total rejected ballots		191	0.83	+0.01
Turnout		23,101	80.31	+6.05
Eligible voters		28,764		
Progressive Conservative gain from Social Credit		Swing		–
Source: Library of Parliament

1957 Canadian federal election
Party	Candidate	Votes	%	±%
Social Credit	John Horne Blackmore	10,910	53.02	–3.61
Liberal	Asael E. Palmer	6,627	32.20	–0.80
Progressive Conservative	John Arthur Spencer	3,041	14.78	+4.41
Total valid votes		20,578	99.18	
Total rejected ballots		171	0.82	–0.10
Turnout		20,749	74.26	+8.75
Eligible voters		27,940		
Social Credit hold		Swing		+2.21
Source: Library of Parliament

1953 Canadian federal election
Party	Candidate	Votes	%	±%
Social Credit	John Horne Blackmore	9,737	56.62	+9.64
Liberal	Ernest Roderick McFarland	5,676	33.01	+2.53
Progressive Conservative	James Erle Carr	1,783	10.37	–2.65
Total valid votes		17,196	99.08	
Total rejected ballots		159	0.92	–0.01
Turnout		17,355	65.51	–4.80
Eligible voters		26,492		
Social Credit hold		Swing		+6.09
Source: Library of Parliament

1949 Canadian federal election
Party	Candidate	Votes	%	±%
Social Credit	John Horne Blackmore	8,880	46.98	+3.46
Liberal	Louis Sherman Turcotte	5,760	30.48	+7.54
Progressive Conservative	John Arthur Jardine	2,460	13.02	–4.90
Co-operative Commonwealth	William Wesley Scott	1,801	9.53	–3.47
Total valid votes		18,901	99.07	
Total rejected ballots		178	0.93	–0.06
Turnout		19,079	70.31	–6.45
Eligible voters		27,134		
Social Credit hold		Swing		+5.50
Source: Library of Parliament

1945 Canadian federal election
Party	Candidate	Votes	%	±%
Social Credit	John Horne Blackmore	7,250	43.52	+2.49
Liberal	Louis Sherman Turcotte	3,820	22.93	–12.79
Progressive Conservative	Philip Baker	2,985	17.92	–5.33
Co-operative Commonwealth	William Wesley Scott	2,165	13.00	–
Labor–Progressive	William Henry Childress	439	2.64	–
Total valid votes		16,659	99.01	
Total rejected ballots		167	0.99	–0.50
Turnout		16,826	76.76	+2.67
Eligible voters		21,921		
Social Credit hold		Swing		+7.64
Source: Library of Parliament

1940 Canadian federal election
Party	Candidate	Votes	%	±%
New Democracy	John Horne Blackmore	6,362	41.03	–9.97
Liberal	Lynden Eldon Fairbairn	5,538	35.72	+19.21
National Government	John Smith Stewart	3,605	23.25	–0.15
Total valid votes		15,505	98.51	
Total rejected ballots		235	1.49	+0.55
Turnout		15,740	74.09	+2.47
Eligible voters		21,244		
New Democracy hold		Swing		–5.06
Source: Library of Parliament

1935 Canadian federal election
Party	Candidate	Votes	%	±%
Social Credit	John Horne Blackmore	6,516	51.00	–
Conservative	John Smith Stewart	2,990	23.40	–15.44
Liberal	Lynden Eldon Fairbairn	2,109	16.51	–13.67
Co-operative Commonwealth	John Albert Johansen	737	5.77	–
Reconstruction	A. Gladstone Virtue	425	3.33	–
Total valid votes		12,777	99.06	
Total rejected ballots		121	0.94	+0.94
Turnout		12,898	71.62	+0.29
Eligible voters		18,009		
Social Credit gain from Conservative		Swing		–
Source: Library of Parliament

1930 Canadian federal election
Party	Candidate	Votes	%	±%
Conservative	John Smith Stewart	4,863	38.84	–1.23
Progressive	Thomas Owen King	3,880	30.99	–
Liberal	Arthur George Baalim	3,779	30.18	–
Total valid votes		12,522	100.00	
Total rejected ballots		unknown		
Turnout		12,522	71.33	+15.68
Eligible voters		17,555		
Conservative gain from United Farmers of Alberta		Swing		–
Source: Library of Parliament

1926 Canadian federal election
Party	Candidate	Votes	%	±%
United Farmers of Alberta	Lincoln Henry Jelliff	5,138	59.93	+6.24
Conservative	Andrew Bryden Hogg	3,435	40.07	–6.24
Total valid votes		8,573	100.00	
Total rejected ballots		unknown		
Turnout		8,573	55.65	–6.10
Eligible voters		15,404		
United Farmers of Alberta gain from Progressive		Swing		–
Source: Library of Parliament

1925 Canadian federal election
Party	Candidate	Votes	%	±%
Progressive	Lincoln Henry Jelliff	5,399	53.70	+4.45
Conservative	John Smith Stewart	4,656	46.31	+33.12
Total valid votes		10,055	100.00	
Total rejected ballots		unknown		
Turnout		10,055	61.75	–7.39
Eligible voters		16,283		
Progressive hold		Swing		–
Source: Library of Parliament

1921 Canadian federal election
Party	Candidate	Votes	%	±%
Progressive	Lincoln Henry Jelliff	4,961	49.25	–
Labour	Martin Francis Finn	3,170	31.47	–
Conservative	William Sargent Ball	1,328	13.18	–
Liberal	James Edward Lovering	615	6.11	–
Total valid votes		10,074	100.00	
Total rejected ballots		unknown		
Turnout		10,074	69.14	–32.32
Eligible voters		14,570		
Progressive gain from Government (Unionist)		Swing		–
Source: Library of Parliament

1917 Canadian federal election
Party	Candidate	Votes	%	±%
Government (Unionist)	William Ashbury Buchanan	5,302	68.24	–
Opposition-Labour	L. Lambert Pack	2,468	31.76	–
Total valid votes		7,770	100.00	
Total rejected ballots		unknown		
Turnout		7,770	101.46	–
Eligible voters		7,658		
Government (Unionist) notional gain		Swing		–
Source: Library of Parliament

== See also ==
- List of Canadian electoral districts
- Historical federal electoral districts of Canada
