= Gurdev =

Gurdev is a masculine given name. Notable people with this name include:

- Gurdev Khush (born 1935), an Indian agronomist and geneticist
- Gurdev Singh (field hockey) (born 1933), a former Indian field hockey player
- Gurdev Singh (musician) (born 1948), an Indian-born musician who lives in London, U.K.
- Gurdev Singh Badal (died 2017), an Indian politician
- Gurdev Singh Gill (footballer), a former Indian football player
- Gurdev Singh Gill (physician) (1931 – 2003), an Indian-Canadian doctor and activist
- Gurdev Singh Mann (fl. 2022), an Indian politician
- Gurdev Singh Mattu (fl. 2004), an also-ran for the Communist Party of Canada in the 2004 federal election
- Gurdev Singh Kaunke (1949 – 1993), an Indian Sikh priest
