= Christian Heritage Party of Canada candidates in the 2004 Canadian federal election =

The Christian Heritage Party is a minor political party in Canada. It ran 62 candidates in the 2004 federal election. Information about some of these candidates may be found here. The leader of the party at the time of the election was Ron Gray.

== Quebec ==
=== Argenteuil—Mirabel: Laurent Filion ===
Laurent Filion is a construction contractor and real estate agent based in Duhamel, Quebec. He joined the Christian Heritage Party in 1995 and has run for the party three times; he appeared on the ballot as a non-affiliated candidate in 2000 because the party was not registered with Elections Canada. He was the Christian Heritage Party's only Quebec candidate in 2004.

Filion has also run for municipal council in Duhamel.

Electoral record
Election	Division	Party	Votes	%	Place	Winner
1997 federal	Argenteuil—Papineau	Christian Heritage	505	0.97	6/6	Maurice Dumas, Bloc Québécois
2000 federal	Argenteuil—Papineau—Mirabel	N/A (Christian Heritage)	167	0.33	9/9	Mario Laframboise, Bloc Québécois
2004 federal	Argenteuil—Mirabel	Christian Heritage	202	0.41	6/7	Mario Laframboise, Bloc Québécois
2009 municipal	Duhamel council, Ward One	n/a	125	23.32	3/3	Patrick Douglas

== Ontario ==
=== Peter J. Ellis (Guelph) ===
Peter J. Ellis received 634 votes, finishing fifth against Liberal incumbent Brenda Chamberlain.

=== Stephen Downey (Hamilton Centre) ===
Downey received 520 votes (1.17%), finishing fifth against New Democratic Party candidate David Christopherson. See his entry here for more information.

=== Terry Marshall (Kingston and the Islands) ===
See here for full information. Marshall has been a candidate for the Christian Heritage Party of Canada, having campaigned for the party four times.

=== Allan (Al) James (Lambton—Kent—Middlesex) ===
James is a chemical engineer. He was 43 years old in 2002, and was a Global manager for the Dow Automotive Group in Sarnia (Windsor Star, 11 May 2002). He has campaigned for the CHP on three occasions.

Electoral record
Election	Division	Party	Votes	%	Place	Winner
1988 federal	Kent	Christian Heritage	1,942		4/4	Rex Crawford, Liberal
federal by-election, May 13, 2002	Windsor West	Christian Heritage	249	0.76	6/6	Brian Masse, New Democratic Party
2004 federal	Lambton-Kent-Middlesex	Christian Heritage	1,015		5/5	Rose-Marie Ur, Liberal

=== Linda Klassen (St. Catharines) ===
Klassen was born Linda Stacey. She moved from her home region of Simcoe County to the Niagara region in 1985, and was a Community Outreach Counsellor with the Niagara Region Sexual Assault Centre, St. Catharines from 1989 to 2001. Before running for the CHP in 2004, she campaigned for the Family Coalition Party of Ontario in the 2003 provincial election.

Klassen has argued that the concept of "sexual orientation" has been fabricated by "deviants who wanted their unnatural sexual preferences dignified and legalized", and has written that Canadian society was better when homosexuality was "in the closet".

Electoral record
Election	Division	Party	Votes	%	Place	Winner
2003 provincial	St. Catharines	Family Coalition	714	1.62	5/5	Jim Bradley, Liberal
2004 federal	St. Catharines	Christian Heritage	741	1.43	5/7	Walt Lastewka, Liberal

=== Pat Woode (Wellington—Halton Hills) ===
Woode was born in 1946, near Woodstock, Ontario. She graduated in Social Work from the Ryerson Polytechnical Institute in 1968, and after a year she had graduated from the institute, she worked at Queen Elizabeth Hospital in Toronto from 1969 to 1973. Woode wrote a column on disability issues in the Georgetown Herald from 1983 to 1988, hosted a show on Halton Cable TV for three years, and has been an environmental activist. She is affiliated with the Family Coalition Party of Ontario at the provincial level, and is an opponent of abortion and gay rights. She was 58 years old in 2004.

She received 826 votes (1.65%), finishing fifth against Conservative candidate Michael Chong.

== Manitoba ==
=== David C. Andres (Dauphin—Swan River) ===
Andres was born on May 17, 1959, at Norquay, Saskatchewan, and moved with his family to Ethelbert, Manitoba, as a child. After completing high school, he worked with the Canadian National Railway in northern Manitoba before returning to Ethelbert to work as a mechanic and farmer. In 1979, he began "Andres Insurance Brokers" with his wife, and also started a Sears Canada Catalogue Order Office in the region.

The 2004 election was his first venture into electoral politics. He received 560 votes, or 1.68% of the total cast in the riding.

=== David J. Reimer (Portage—Lisgar) ===
David J. Reimer received 1,458 votes (4.19%), finishing fourth against Conservative candidate Brian Pallister.

=== Jeannine Moquin-Perry (St. Boniface) ===
Raised in Saskatchewan, Moquin-Perry subsequently moved to Manitoba to practice as a registered nurse. She has a Bachelor of Science degree in Nursing from the University of Manitoba, as well as certificates in Teaching and Administration. During the 2004 election, she was a student of LAMBS Disciplineship Project, a religious institution. Along with her husband, she has also hosted a Home Church Fellowship for several years.

The 2004 election was Moquin-Perry's first as a candidate. She received 378 votes (0.98%), finishing fifth against Liberal incumbent Raymond Simard.

=== Jane MacDiarmid (Winnipeg South) ===
MacDiarmid received 206 votes (0.79%), finishing fifth against Liberal incumbent Reg Alcock.

== Yukon ==
=== Geoffrey Capp (Yukon) ===
See here for more information. He has run for the CHP five times, as well as once in a territorial election.

== Other candidates (detailed entry not prepared) ==
Colin George Atkins (Brandon—Souris, Manitoba) (also ran 2000, 1997)

Anthony Barendregt (Selkirk—Interlake, Manitoba) (also ran 2000)

Leslie Bartley (Oxford, Ontario)

Timothy J. Bloedow (Glengarry—Prescott—Russell, Ontario)

Durk Bruinsma (Clarington—Scugog—Uxbridge, Ontario) (also ran 2000, 1997, 1993)

David W. Bylsma (Niagara West—Glanbrook, Ontario) (also ran 2000, 1997, 1993)

Gary De Boer (Sarnia—Lambton, Ontario)

Irma DeVries (Perth Wellington, Ontario)

Ken De Vries (Elgin—Middlesex—London, Ontario) (also ran 2000, 1997, 1993)

Steven Elgersma (Haldimand—Norfolk, Ontario)

Frank Ellis (Kitchener—Waterloo, Ontario) (also ran 2000)

Ursula Ellis (Dufferin—Caledon, Ontario)

Barra L. Gots (Brant, Ontario)

John G. Gots (Cambridge (federal electoral district), Ontario) (also ran 2000)

Ron Gray, leader (Chilliwack—Fraser Canyon, B.C.) (also ran 2000, 1997, 1988, and in byelections May 2003, May 2002, Nov 1999, Mar 1996)

Joseph F. Grubb (York West, Ontario)

Vicki Gunn (York—Simcoe, Ontario)

Larry R. Heather (Calgary Southwest, Alberta) (also ran 1997, 1993)

Gerhard Herwig (Surrey North, B.C.) (also ran 2000)

James "Jim" Hnatiuk (Kings—Hants, Nova Scotia)

Jacques "Jack" Hummelman (New Westminster—Coquitlam, B.C.)

Robert Thomas Jacobson (Souris—Moose Mountain, Manitoba)

Dave Joslin (Huron—Bruce, Ontario) (also ran 2000, 1997)

W. Baird Judson (Charlottetown, P.E.I.) (also ran 2000, 1997, 1993, 1988)

Ryan Kidd (Don Valley East, Ontario) (also ran 2000)

Gloria Kieler (Vancouver East, B.C.) (also ran 2000, 1997)

Adrian Kooger (Simcoe North, Ontario) (also ran 2000)

Harold J. Ludwig (Abbotsford, B.C.) (also ran 2000, 1997)

Mary Sylvia Nelson (Regina—Qu'Appelle, Saskatchewan)

Joe Pal (Vancouver Centre, B.C.) (also ran 1997)

Katherine Reimer (Kildonan—St. Paul, Manitoba)

Irma Ruiter (Welland, Ontario)

Johannes Scheibler (Thunder Bay—Rainy River, Ontario) Rob Scott (Elmwood—Transcona, Manitoba) (also ran 2000, 1997, 1993)

Edward Spronk (Edmonton East, Alberta)

Diane Stephan (Battlefords—Lloydminster, Saskatchewan)

Harold Stephan (Palliser, Saskatchewan)

Jacob Strydhorst (Yellowhead, Alberta) (also ran 2000)

Clayton A. Sundberg (Blackstrap, Alberta)

Rod Taylor (Skeena—Bulkley Valley, B.C.)

Steven Taylor (Bruce—Grey—Owen Sound, Ontario)

Eric Truijen (Winnipeg North, Manitoba) (also ran in 2000, 1993)

William Ubbens (Etobicoke North, Ontario) (also ran 1988, byelection Dec 1990)

Ken Vanden Broek (Lethbridge, Alberta)

Peter Vander Zaag (Simcoe—Grey, Ontario)

Peter Vogel (Haliburton—Kawartha Lakes—Brock, Ontario)

Frank Wagner (Vancouver South, B.C.) (also ran 2000)

Maurice G. Whittle (Oak Ridges—Markham, Ontario)

Sally Wong (Mississauga East—Cooksville, Ontario)

John H. Wubs (Burlington, Ontario)

Previous runs for a candidate were not necessarily in a riding of the same name.
