= Communist Party of Canada (Marxist–Leninist) candidates in the 2004 Canadian federal election =

The Communist Party of Canada - Marxist-Leninist ran several candidates in the 2004 federal election, none of whom were elected. Information about these candidates may be found on this page.

== Quebec ==
=== Argenteuil—Mirabel: Michael O'Grady ===
Michael O'Grady was a student at the time of the election. He received 69 votes (0.14%), finishing seventh against Bloc Québécois incumbent Mario Laframboise.

There is a different Michael O'Grady involved in municipal politics in Longueuil, Quebec.

== Ontario ==
=== Robert A. Cruise (Essex) ===
Cruise was born in Vancouver, British Columbia, and has a Bachelor of Arts degree in political science from the University of British Columbia. He is a retired auto-parts company worker with (Kendan Manufacturing), a longtime member of the CPC-ML, and a perennial candidate for the party. He has written articles for the Marxist-Leninist Daily newspaper, including one work strongly criticizing the American media's response to the 9-11 terror attacks. Cruise was fifty years old at the time of the 1993 federal election (Windsor Star, 23 September 1993).

During his career as a mechanical worker, Cruise was a member of the Canadian Auto Workers Local 195 in Windsor (Windsor Star, 22 October 1993). In 1992, he was a leader of the "Windsor and Essex County Committee to Vote No on October 26", an advocacy group opposing the Charlottetown Accord (Windsor Star, 10 October 1992).

He highlighted gender issues during the 1993 campaign, and complained that the factory which employed him had never hired a woman in its fifty-year existence (Windsor Star, 4 October 1993).

His electoral record is as follows:

- 1972 Canadian federal election, Mount Royal, 80 votes, sixth out of six candidates. The winner was Liberal Prime Minister Pierre-Elliott Trudeau. Cruise appeared on the ballot as a non-affiliated candidate, as the CPC-ML was not registered with Elections Canada.
- 1974 Canadian federal election, Mount Royal, 162 votes, sixth out of six candidates. The winner was Prime Minister Trudeau.
- 1979 Canadian federal election, Guelph, 45 votes, sixth out of seven candidates. The winner was Albert Fish of the Progressive Conservative Party.
- 1980 Canadian federal election, Guelph, 53 votes, sixth out of seven candidates. The winner was James Schroder of the Liberal Party.
- 1988 Canadian federal election, Windsor West, 127 votes, fourth out of five candidates. The winner was Herb Gray of the Liberal Party. Cruise appeared on the ballot as a non-affiliated candidate, and the CPC-ML was not registered with Elections Canada.
- 1993 Canadian federal election, Windsor West, 93 votes, eighth out of nine candidates. The winner was Herb Gray.
- 1997 Canadian federal election, Windsor West, 199 votes, sixth out of six candidates. The winner was Herb Gray.
- 1999 Ontario provincial election, Windsor West, 270 votes (0.73%), fifth out of five candidates. The winner was Sandra Pupatello of the Ontario Liberal Party. Cruise appeared on the ballot as an independent candidate, as the Marxist-Leninist Party was not registered with Elections Ontario.
- 2000 Canadian federal election, Essex, 152 votes, fifth out of five candidates. The winner was Susan Whelan of the Liberal Party.
- 2004 Canadian federal election, Essex, 105 votes, fifth out of five candidates. The winner was Jeff Watson of the Conservative Party.

=== Stephen Rutchinski (Nickel Belt) ===
Rutchinski received 51 votes, finishing seventh against Liberal candidate Raymond Bonin.

=== Saroj Bains (Ottawa South) ===
Bains is the daughter of CPC-ML founder Hardial Bains and former party leader Sandra Smith. She was twenty-four years old at the time of the 2003 provincial election, and was affiliated with the Youth Organizing Project.

She lists her occupation as a multimedia producer working in film and communications, and became politically active at age fifteen, via her media activities. Bains has worked on the Youth Today and Aboriginal Youth Today publications, and has been a member of the Standing Conference of South Asians and the National Council of Youth Commission on the Future of Quebec. Her financial officer in 2003 was Margaret Villamizar.

Electoral record:

- 2000 Canadian federal election, Westmount—Ville-Marie, 151 votes, ninth out of ten candidates. The winner was Lucienne Robillard of the Liberal Party.
- 2003 Ontario provincial election, Windsor—St. Clair, 253 votes, fifth out of five candidates. The winner was Dwight Duncan of the Ontario Liberal Party. Bains campaigned as an "Independent Renewal" candidate, and appeared on the ballot as an independent.
- 2004 Canadian federal election, Ottawa South, 79 votes, eighth out of eight candidates. The winner was David McGuinty of the Liberal Party.

=== David Gershuny (Mississauga—Brampton South) ===
Gershuny received 185 votes, finishing fifth against Liberal candidate Navdeep Bains.

=== Enver Villamizar (Windsor West) ===
In the 2004 Canadian federal election Villamizar ran in Windsor West winning 134 votes to rank fifth out of five candidates. The winner was Brian Masse of the New Democratic Party.

== Alberta ==
=== André C. Vachon (Calgary West) ===
Vachon is a construction worker and printer, and a perennial candidate for the Marxist-Leninist Party. He moved from Quebec to Calgary in 1970, and works primarily in pipeline construction. He was 57 years old at the time of the 2004 election (Calgary Herald, 27 June 2004).

During the 2004 election, he was quoted as saying "The program of our party put as simply as possible is to stop paying the rich and increase funding for social programs [...] Of course health and education are the two great pillars of society, and we don't think that investments in education is a drain on society." He also described same-sex marriage as a "red herring", which "distracts voters from issues that matter to Canadians".

His electoral record is as follows:

- 1980 Canadian federal election, Calgary South, 34 votes, seventh out of seven candidates. The winner was John William Thomson of the Progressive Conservative Party.
- 1988 Canadian federal election, Lincoln, 28 votes, eighth out of eight candidates. The winner was Shirley Martin of the Progressive Conservative Party. Vachon appears on the ballot as a non-affiliated candidate, as the Marxist-Leninist Party was not registered with Elections Canada.
- 1993 Canadian federal election, Parkdale—High Park, 53 votes, eleventh out of eleven candidates. The winner was Jesse Flis of the Liberal Party.
- 1997 Canadian federal election, Brampton Centre, 127 votes, fifth out of five candidates. The winner was Sarkis Assadourian of the Liberal Party.
- 2000 Canadian federal election, Sarnia—Lambton, 32 votes, tenth out of ten candidates. The winner was Roger Gallaway of the Liberal Party.
- 2004 Canadian federal election, Calgary West, 87 votes, sixth out of six candidates. The winner was Rob Anders of the Conservative Party.
