= 2004 Canadian federal election =

- June 28, 2004

308 seats in the House of Commons 155 seats needed for a majority
- Opinion polls
- Registered: 22,466,621
- Turnout: 60.9% (▼3.2 pp)
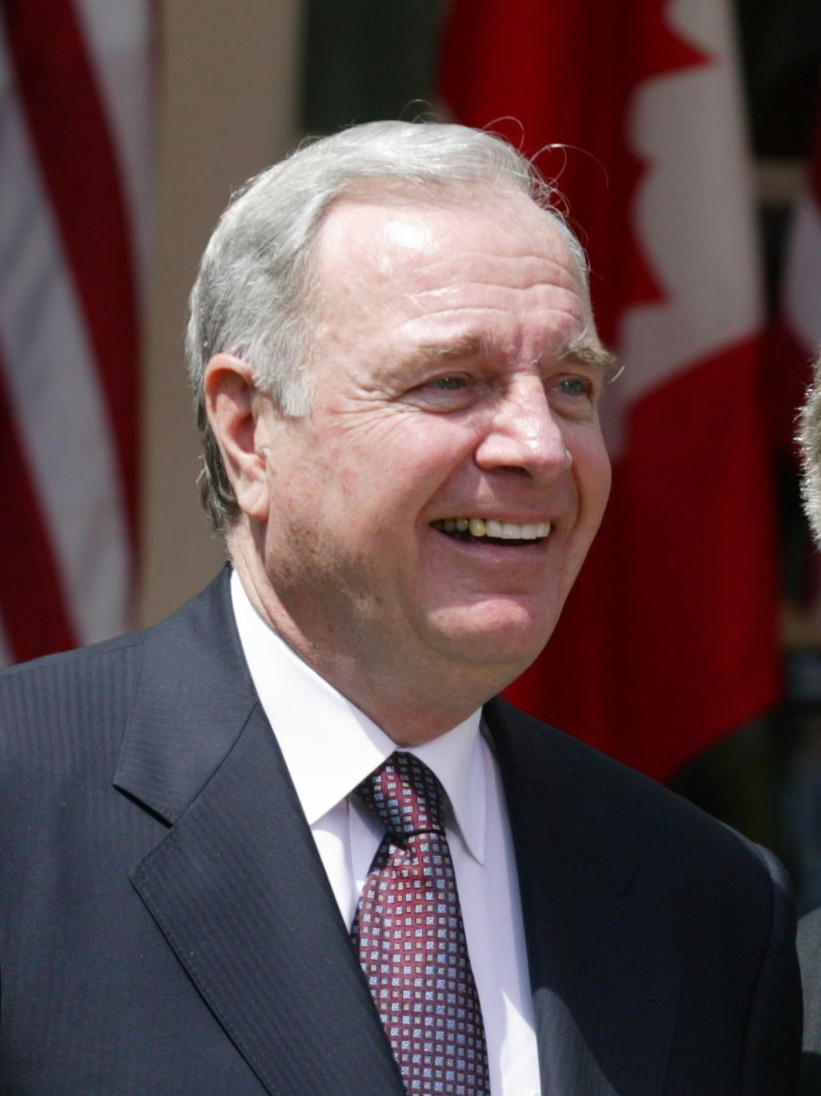

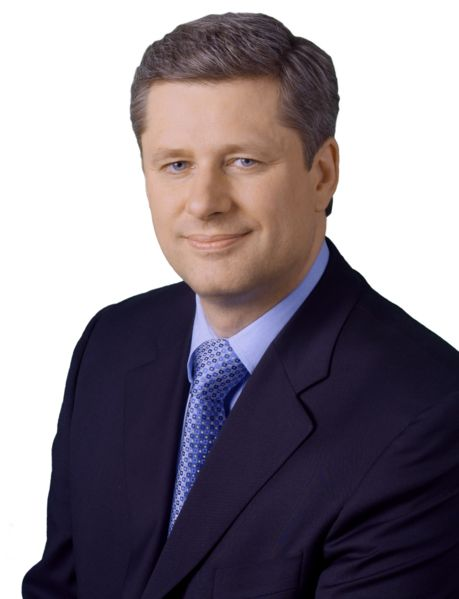

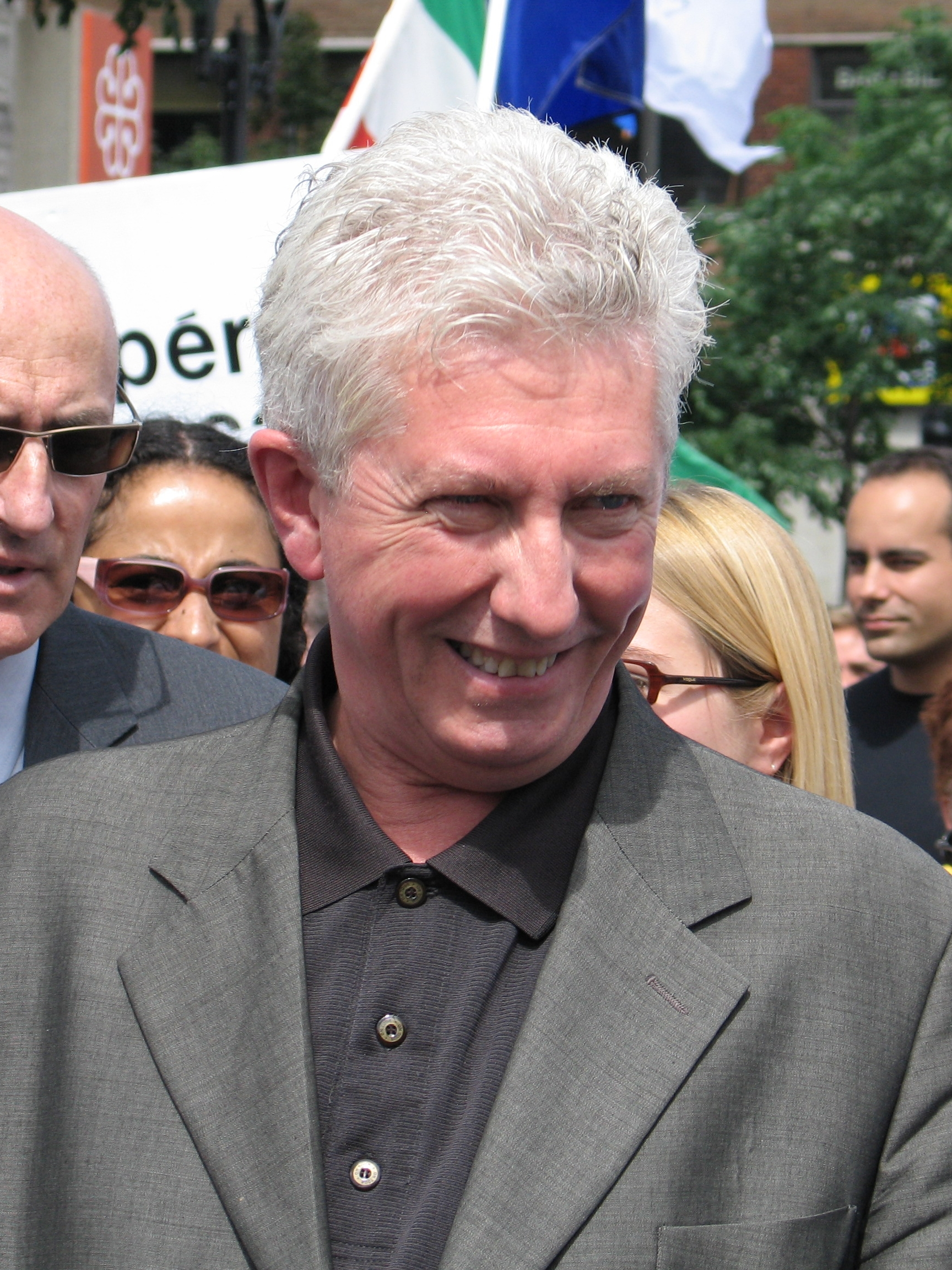

	First party	Second party
Leader	Paul Martin	Stephen Harper
Party	Liberal	Conservative
Leader since	November 14, 2003	March 20, 2004
Leader's seat	LaSalle—Émard	Calgary Southwest
Last election	172 seats, 40.85%	78 seats, 37.68%
Seats before	168	72
Seats won	135	99
Seat change	▼33	▲27
Popular vote	4,982,220	4,019,498
Percentage	36.73%	29.63%
Swing	▼4.12 pp	▼8.05 pp
	Third party	Fourth party
Leader	Gilles Duceppe	Jack Layton
Party	Bloc Québécois	New Democratic
Leader since	March 15, 1997	January 24, 2003
Leader's seat	Laurier	Ran in Toronto—Danforth (won)
Last election	38 seats, 10.72%	13 seats, 8.51%
Seats before	33	14
Seats won	54	19
Seat change	▲21	▲5
Popular vote	1,680,109	2,127,403
Percentage	12.39% (Note: Only contested seats in Quebec.)	15.68%
Swing	▲1.67 pp	▲7.17 pp

- The Canadian parliament after the 2004 election
Prime Minister before election
Paul Martin
Liberal
Prime Minister after election
Paul Martin
Liberal

The 2004 Canadian federal election was held on June 28, 2004, to elect members to the House of Commons of Canada of the 38th Parliament of Canada. The Liberal government of Prime Minister Paul Martin lost its majority but was able to continue in office as a minority government after the election. This was the first election contested by the newly amalgamated Conservative Party of Canada, after it was formed by the two right-of-centre parties, the Progressive Conservative Party and the Canadian Alliance.

On May 23, 2004, the governor general, Adrienne Clarkson, on the advice of Martin, ordered the dissolution of the House of Commons, triggering an early election despite the Liberals being only three and a half years into their five-year mandate. Earlier, the election result was widely expected to be a fourth consecutive majority government for the Liberals, but early in 2004 Liberal popularity fell sharply due to the emerging details of the sponsorship scandal. Polls even started to indicate the possibility of a Conservative minority government. In the end, the Liberals won a minority government, though they were well short of a majority and lost nearly three dozen seats. This was the last time any party in Canada won four consecutive terms in government until 2025, which was also won by the Liberals. It was also the first election since 1988 in which the NDP won any seats in Ontario.

On election day, polling times were arranged to allow results from most provinces to be announced more or less simultaneously, with the exception of Atlantic Canada, whose results were known before the close of polling in other provinces due to the British Columbia Supreme Court's decision in R v Bryan.

== Major political parties ==
=== Liberal Party of Canada ===
Until the sponsorship scandal, most pundits were predicting that new Prime Minister Paul Martin would lead the Liberal Party of Canada to a fourth majority government, possibly setting a record for number of seats won.

However, polls released immediately after the scandal broke showed Liberal support down as much as 10% nationwide, with greater declines in its heartland of Quebec and Ontario. Although there was some recovery in Ontario and Atlantic Canada, Liberal hopes of making unprecedented gains in the west faded. The unpopularity of some provincial Liberal parties may also have had an effect on federal Liberal fortunes. In Ontario, for instance, the provincial Liberal government introduced an unpopular budget the week of the expected election call, and their federal counterparts then fell into a statistical dead heat with the Conservatives in polls there. The Liberals were also harmed by high-profile party infighting that had been plaguing the party since Martin's earlier ejection from Cabinet by now-former Prime Minister Jean Chrétien.

=== Conservative Party of Canada ===
In the final months of 2003, the Progressive Conservatives and the Canadian Alliance were running a distant third and fourth, respectively, in public opinion polls.

Many pundits predicted that the combination of the popular and fiscally conservative Martin, along with continued vote-splitting on the right, could have led to the almost total annihilation of the Progressive Conservatives and Canadian Alliance. This fear prompted those two parties to form a united Conservative Party of Canada, which was approved by the members of the Canadian Alliance on December 5, 2003, and controversially by the delegates of the Progressive Conservatives on December 6, 2003.

The new Conservative Party pulled well ahead of the NDP in the polls just before the election, although its support remained below the combined support that the Progressive Conservatives and the Alliance had as separate parties. On March 20, the Conservatives elected Stephen Harper as their new leader.

The Conservatives gained more ground in polls after Harper became leader, and the poll results in the weeks before the election had them within one to two points of the Liberals, sometimes ahead, sometimes behind them. Party supporters hoped that the voters would react negatively to the Liberal attacks on what they called Harper's "hidden agenda", and that anger over the sponsorship scandal and other Liberal failures would translate to success at the polls.

Late in the campaign, the Conservatives began to lose some momentum, in part due to remarks made by MPs. Scott Reid, the party's language critic, said that the policy of official bilingualism was unrealistic and needed to be reformed. Rob Merrifield, health critic, suggested that women ought to have mandatory family counseling before they choose to have an abortion. Randy White was quoted as saying "to heck with the courts" in reference to Reference Re Same-Sex Marriage, suggesting the party would overturn same-sex marriage. Cheryl Gallant drew controversy when she compared abortion to the beheading of Iraq War hostage Nick Berg, and called for the repeal of recently amended hate laws that include sexual orientation as one of the protected groups. Additionally, the Liberal Party began airing controversial TV ads. Harper was also criticized for his position supporting the American-led 2003 invasion of Iraq. The term "hidden agenda", used commonly in the 2000 election to refer to Stockwell Day, began surfacing with increasing regularity with regard to Harper's history of supporting privatized health care. Further damaging the Conservative campaign was a press release from Conservative headquarters that suggested that Paul Martin supported child pornography.

Although on the eve of the election the party was polling slightly ahead of the Liberals everywhere west of Quebec, it had dropped in support, polling behind or on par with Liberals everywhere except the West (Alberta, British Columbia, Saskatchewan, and Manitoba), where it held onto its traditional support.

All together the new Conservatives fell from the combined Canadian Alliance-Progressive Conservative vote in 2000 of 37%, to only 29% of the vote, yet still gained 21 extra seats, finishing in second-place with 99 seats.

=== New Democratic Party ===
Before the announcement of the merger of the Canadian Alliance and Progressive Conservative Party, some were predicting that the NDP would form the official opposition because the party was polling ahead of both right-of-centre parties. A new leader (Jack Layton) and clear social democratic policies helped revitalize the NDP. Polls suggested that the NDP had returned to the 18% to 20% level of support it enjoyed in the 1984 election and 1988 election. Layton suggested that the NDP would break their previous record of 43 seats won under former leader Ed Broadbent.

The NDP focused the campaign on winning ridings in Canada's urban centres, hoping especially to win seats in central Toronto, Hamilton, Ottawa and Winnipeg. The party's platform was built to cater to these regions and much of Layton's time was spent in these areas.

The campaign stumbled early when Layton blamed the deaths of homeless people on Paul Martin, prompting the Liberals to accuse the NDP of negative campaigning. The NDP benefited from the decline in Liberal support, but not to the same extent as the Conservatives. There was an increasing prospect that NDP voters would switch to the Liberals to block a Conservative government. This concern did not manifest itself in the polls, however, and the NDP remained at somewhat below 20 percent mark in the polls for most of the campaign.

The NDP achieved 15% of the popular vote, its highest in 16 years. However, it only won 19 seats in the House of Commons, two less than the 21 won in 1997, and far short of the 40 predicted. There was criticism that Layton's focus on urban issues and gay rights marginalized the party's traditional emphasis on the poor, the working class, and rural Canadians. Long-time MP Lorne Nystrom and several other incumbents from the Prairie provinces were defeated, with the NDP being shut out of Saskatchewan for the first time since 1965. Layton won his own seat in a tight race, while Broadbent was returned to Parliament after many years of absence.

=== Bloc Québécois ===
The Bloc Québécois (BQ) had managed their best showing back in 1993, but they lost seats to the Liberals in 1997 and 2000, prompting pundits to suggest a decline in support for Quebec sovereignty. The Bloc continued to slide in the polls in most of 2003 after the election of the federalist Quebec Liberal Party at the National Assembly of Quebec under Jean Charest, and during the long run-up to Paul Martin becoming leader of the federal Liberals.

However, things progressively changed during 2003, partly because of the decline in popularity of the Liberal Party of Quebec government of Jean Charest, and partly because support for independence in Quebec rose again (49% in March). The tide took its sharp turn when, in February 2004, the sponsorship scandal (uncovered in considerable part by the Bloc) hit the Liberal federal government.

These events led to a resurgence of the BQ, putting it ahead of the pack once again: according to an Ipsos-Reid poll carried out for The Globe and Mail and CTV between the June 4 and 8, 50% of Quebecers intended to vote for the BQ against 24% for the Liberals.

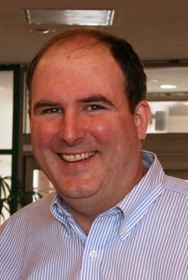
Jim Harris, Greens Leader

Speculation was ongoing about the possibility of the Bloc forming alliances with other opposition parties or with an eventual minority government to promote its goals of social democracy and respect of the autonomy of provinces. Leader Gilles Duceppe stated that the Bloc, as before, would co-operate with other opposition parties or with the government when interests were found to be in common, but that the Bloc would not participate in a coalition government.

=== Green Party of Canada ===
The Greens ran candidates in all 308 ridings for the first time in its history. The party won twice as many votes in this election than it had over the previous 21 years of its history combined, although it failed to win a seat. It also spent more money than in the previous 21 years, and although much of this money was borrowed, the Greens' share of the popular vote enabled them to receive federal funding.

== Campaign slogans ==
These are the official slogans for the 2004 campaigns. The optional parts of the mottos (sometimes not used for efficiency) are put in brackets.

Liberal Party	English: Moving (Canada) Forward or Choose your Canada; French: Allons (or Aller) droit devant (avec l'Équipe Martin) (Moving forward with Team Martin)
Conservative Party	English: Demand Better; French: C'est assez! (Enough!)
Bloc Québécois	Un parti propre au Québec (A party belonging to Quebec or An honest party in Quebec); Pre-election: Parce qu'on est différent (Because we're different)
New Democratic Party	English: [New Energy.] A Positive Choice. French: [Une force nouvelle.] Un choix Positif. (A New Force, A Positive Choice)
Green Party	English: Someday is now French: L'avenir c'est maintenant

== Issues ==
Important issues in the election:

- Sponsorship scandal: badly hurt the Liberals in the polls and the theme of widespread corruption was used by all opposition parties, especially the Bloc.
- Health care: all parties support Canada's government-administered health care system but acknowledge that improvements must be made to meet new demographic challenges and to reduce long wait times. Transfer payments to the provinces have been cut substantially to 16% by the federal Liberal government and it was difficult for Paul Martin to reconcile these cuts with his plan to improve the system.
- Fiscal imbalance: all major parties except the Liberals claimed that there was a monetary imbalance between Ottawa and the provinces and spoke of plans to reduce it, the Bloc Québécois probably being the strongest denouncer of the situation.
- Taxation: for the Conservatives, significantly lowering taxes, to stimulate the economy, was a central issue. The Conservatives also promised to end "corporate welfare" and replace it with tax cuts for all businesses. The Liberals, Communist Party and NDP opposed large tax cuts and argued that money should instead be spent to improve social programs.
- Child care: The Liberals and NDP promised national child care programs.
- Parliamentary reform: The Conservatives accused the Liberals of perpetuating "undemocratic practices" in Parliament, by limiting the powers of MPs. Martin called for some reform, but not to the satisfaction of the Conservatives. The Conservatives promised an elected Senate and standing committee and provincial review of judicial appointments. The NDP spoke of abolishing the Senate.
- Electoral reform: Conservatives promised fixed election dates. The NDP promoted the idea of proportional representation voting.
- Same-sex marriage: The Bloc Québécois and the NDP strongly favoured same sex marriage. The NDP considers it a human rights issue, and requires its MPs to either support legislation favouring same-sex marriage or abstain on such questions. The Bloc, on the other hand, treats it as a matter of conscience, allowing its members free votes on the issue. The Liberals sent the issue to be ruled upon by the Supreme Court, and the Liberal caucus was publicly divided on the issue. The majority of Conservative candidates opposed it; the Conservative party's official stance was for the issue to be resolved by a free vote in the Commons.
- National Missile Defence: the Bush administration in the U.S. wanted Canada to join the missile shield. The Conservatives strongly supported such a plan while the Bloc and the NDP opposed it. Although the Liberals reiterated past opposition to the weaponization of space, they did not have an expressed opinion on the shield.
- 2003 invasion of Iraq: the Conservatives supported the United States over Iraq, while the other parties generally opposed it.
- Gun registry: The Conservatives strongly opposed the gun registry while the other parties support it.
- Marijuana: The Liberals have introduced measures to decriminalize possession of small quantities of marijuana, a move generally supported by the other opposition parties. The Conservative Party opposes such legislation. The Bloc Québécois is more explicit in its support for decriminalization, while the NDP wishes to study the issue and consider going beyond mere decriminalization.
- Abortion: This was not a significant issue in this election. Abortion is legal in Canada after Parliament's failure to pass legislation to replace previous restrictions ruled illegal by the courts. Many Conservatives and a few Liberals oppose abortion. The Liberals tried to use it as a wedge issue after comments from pro-life Conservatives, but it did not change the outcome.
- Ontario budget: The introduction by the Liberal government of Dalton McGuinty of "Ontario Health Premiums" was very unpopular, despite Mr. McGuinty's claim that this new tax was necessary because of the budgetary deficit left by the previous Progressive Conservative government. The Conservatives and the NDP capitalized on this and other unpopular fiscal and tax-related policy to attack the Liberals at the federal level.

== Opinion polls ==
Voting intentions during the 2004 Canadian federal election campaign

== Results ==
In 2004, a federal party required 155 of the 308 seats to form a majority government in Canada. The Liberals came short of this number, winning 135. Until extremely close ridings were decided on the west coast, it appeared as though the Liberals' seat total, if combined with that of the left-wing New Democratic Party (NDP), would be sufficient to hold a majority in the House of Commons. In the end, the Conservatives won Vancouver Island North, West Vancouver-Sunshine Coast, and New Westminster-Coquitlam, after trailing in all three ridings, as preliminary results were announced through the evening.

As a result, the combined seat count of the Liberals and the NDP was 154, while the other 154 seats belonged to the Conservatives, Bloquistes, and one independent Chuck Cadman (previously a Conservative). Rather than forming a coalition with the NDP, the Liberal party led a minority government, obtaining majorities for its legislation on an ad hoc basis. Nevertheless, as the showdown on Bill C-48, a matter of confidence, loomed in the spring of 2005, the Liberals and NDP, who wanted to continue the Parliament, found themselves matched against the Conservatives and the Bloc, who were registering no confidence. The bill passed with the Speaker casting the decisive tie-breaking vote.

Voter turnout nationwide was 60.9%, the lowest in Canadian history at that time, with 13,683,570 out of 22,466,621 registered voters casting their ballots. The voter turnout fell by more than 3pp from the 2000 federal election which had 64.1% turnout.

Elections to the 38th Canadian Parliament (2004)
Party	Leader	Candidates	Votes				Seats		
Party	Leader	Candidates	#	±	%	Change (pp)	2000	2004	±
Liberal	Paul Martin	308	4,982,220	269,811▼	36.73	-4.12	172	135 / 308	37▼
Conservative (Note: Compared to combined total of Alliance/PC in 2000.)	Stephen Harper	308	4,019,498	824,429▼	29.63	-8.04	78	99 / 308	21▲
New Democratic	Jack Layton	308	2,127,403	1,033,535▲	15.68	7.18	13	19 / 308	6▲
Bloc Québécois	Gilles Duceppe	75	1,680,109	302,382▲	12.39	1.67	38	54 / 308	16▲
Green	Jim Harris	308	582,247	477,845▲	4.29	3.48			
Independent		65	64,864	9,828▲	0.48	0.05	–	1 / 308	1▲
Christian Heritage	Ron Gray	62	40,335	40,335▲	0.30	New			
Marijuana	Marc-Boris St-Maurice	71	33,276	32,982▼	0.25	-0.27			
Progressive Canadian	Ernie Schreiber	16	10,872	10,872▲	0.08	New			
Canadian Action	Connie Fogal	45	8,807	18,296▼	0.06	-0.15			
Marxist–Leninist	Sandra L. Smith	76	8,696	3,372▼	0.06	-0.03			
Communist	Miguel Figueroa	35	4,426	4,350▼	0.03	-0.04			
Libertarian	Jean-Serge Brisson	8	1,949	1,949▲	0.01	New			
Total		1,685	13,564,702		100.00%				
Rejected ballots			118,868	20,544▼					
Turnout			13,683,570	686,385▲	60.91%	0.27▼			
Registered voters			22,466,621	1,223,148▲					

=== Synopsis of results ===
Results by riding — 2004 Canadian federal election
Riding		2000 (Redist.)	Winning party					Turnout (Note: including spoilt ballots)	Votes (Note: minor political parties receiving less than 1% of the national popular vote are aggregated under "Other"; independent candidates are aggregated separately)							
Riding		2000 (Redist.)	Party	Votes	Share	Margin #	Margin %	Turnout	Lib	Con	NDP	BQ	Green	Ind	Other	Total
AB	Athabasca	All	Con	17,942	60.30%	10,784	36.24%	47.85%	7,158	17,942	3,115	–	1,542	–	–	29,757
AB	Calgary East	All	Con	21,897	61.12%	14,276	39.85%	47.79%	7,621	21,897	3,535	–	2,529	–	245	35,827
AB	Calgary North Centre	All	Con	28,143	54.19%	17,050	32.83%	60.97%	11,093	28,143	6,298	–	5,840	380	184	51,938
AB	Calgary Northeast	All	Con	21,924	62.24%	13,252	37.62%	47.80%	8,672	21,924	2,682	–	1,658	–	291	35,227
AB	Calgary—Nose Hill	All	Con	31,088	64.38%	20,037	41.50%	61.21%	11,051	31,088	3,250	–	2,898	–	–	48,287
AB	Calgary South Centre	All	Con	26,192	51.16%	10,887	21.26%	57.54%	15,305	26,192	4,350	–	5,080	–	274	51,201
AB	Calgary Southeast	All	Con	36,843	71.00%	28,355	54.64%	63.72%	8,488	36,843	3,419	–	3,142	–	–	51,892
AB	Calgary Southwest	All	Con	35,297	68.36%	25,796	49.96%	64.49%	9,501	35,297	2,884	–	3,210	–	745	51,637
AB	Calgary West	All	Con	31,322	55.90%	14,920	26.63%	67.52%	16,402	31,322	3,632	–	4,274	–	402	56,032
AB	Crowfoot	All	Con	37,649	80.21%	34,034	72.51%	62.36%	3,615	37,649	3,241	–	1,795	–	639	46,939
AB	Edmonton—Beaumont	Lib	Lib	17,555	42.82%	134	0.33%	59.67%	17,555	17,421	3,975	–	1,911	–	135	40,997
AB	Edmonton Centre	Lib	Lib	22,560	42.50%	721	1.36%	59.77%	22,560	21,839	4,836	–	2,584	221	1,043	53,083
AB	Edmonton East	All	Con	20,224	46.02%	5,974	13.59%	51.58%	14,250	20,224	6,464	–	2,471	–	538	43,947
AB	Edmonton—Leduc	All	Con	26,791	55.05%	12,522	25.73%	65.08%	14,269	26,791	4,581	–	3,029	–	–	48,670
AB	Edmonton—St. Albert	All	Con	29,508	57.65%	17,149	33.51%	60.04%	12,359	29,508	5,927	–	3,387	–	–	51,181
AB	Edmonton—Sherwood Park	All	Con	27,222	57.87%	15,703	33.38%	60.15%	11,519	27,222	5,155	–	3,146	–	–	47,042
AB	Edmonton—Spruce Grove	All	Con	30,497	60.40%	17,585	34.83%	60.33%	12,912	30,497	4,508	–	2,572	–	–	50,489
AB	Edmonton—Strathcona	All	Con	19,089	39.40%	5,032	10.39%	65.66%	14,057	19,089	11,535	–	3,146	–	622	48,449
AB	Lethbridge	All	Con	29,765	62.62%	19,515	41.06%	61.92%	10,250	29,765	4,623	–	1,262	–	1,632	47,532
AB	Macleod	All	Con	32,232	74.76%	27,018	62.67%	60.03%	5,214	32,232	2,802	–	2,865	–	–	43,113
AB	Medicine Hat	All	Con	30,241	76.15%	25,910	65.24%	53.88%	4,331	30,241	3,643	–	1,498	–	–	39,713
AB	Peace River	All	Con	28,158	65.13%	19,958	46.16%	53.73%	8,200	28,158	4,804	–	2,073	–	–	43,235
AB	Red Deer	All	Con	33,510	74.80%	28,216	62.98%	57.73%	5,294	33,510	3,500	–	2,142	–	353	44,799
AB	Vegreville—Wainwright	All	Con	33,800	73.54%	28,410	61.82%	59.56%	5,390	33,800	3,793	–	2,976	–	–	45,959
AB	Westlock—St. Paul	All	Con	26,433	66.80%	18,814	47.55%	56.56%	7,619	26,433	3,480	–	2,036	–	–	39,568
AB	Wetaskiwin	All	Con	31,404	73.66%	26,316	61.73%	60.77%	5,088	31,404	3,090	–	2,642	–	410	42,634
AB	Wild Rose	All	Con	33,337	70.60%	27,366	57.95%	61.51%	5,971	33,337	4,009	–	3,904	–	–	47,221
AB	Yellowhead	All	Con	26,503	68.61%	22,062	57.11%	56.57%	4,441	26,503	4,429	–	2,534	–	721	38,628
BC	Abbotsford	All	Con	29,587	61.37%	19,970	41.42%	64.57%	9,617	29,587	6,575	–	1,389	–	1,040	48,208
BC	Burnaby—Douglas	NDP	NDP	15,682	34.59%	934	2.06%	61.49%	14,748	12,531	15,682	–	1,687	282	413	45,343
BC	Burnaby—New Westminster	All	NDP	14,061	33.72%	329	0.79%	58.95%	13,732	11,821	14,061	–	1,606	–	478	41,698
BC	Cariboo—Prince George	All	Con	19,721	46.72%	8,538	20.23%	57.43%	8,397	19,721	11,183	–	1,798	478	635	42,212
BC	Chilliwack—Fraser Canyon	All	Con	24,096	53.68%	14,852	33.08%	61.82%	8,249	24,096	9,244	–	1,449	–	1,854	44,892
BC	Delta—Richmond East	All	Con	21,308	45.60%	5,793	12.40%	63.97%	15,515	21,308	6,838	–	3,066	–	–	46,727
BC	Dewdney—Alouette	All	Con	18,490	38.51%	2,797	5.83%	62.29%	10,500	18,490	15,693	–	2,535	798	–	48,016
BC	Esquimalt—Juan de Fuca	All	Lib	19,389	35.30%	2,568	4.68%	65.93%	19,389	13,271	16,821	–	5,078	229	141	54,929
BC	Fleetwood—Port Kells	All	Con	14,052	35.80%	2,484	6.33%	59.06%	11,568 (Note: Gulzar Singh Cheema was previously a member of the Legislative Assembly of British Columbia and a BC Cabinet minister. Before he moved to BC, he had been a member of the Legislative Assembly of Manitoba.)	14,052	10,976	–	2,484	–	167	39,247
BC	Kamloops—Thompson	All	Con	20,611	40.35%	6,177	12.09%	63.89%	14,434	20,611	13,379	–	2,213	440	–	51,077
BC	Kelowna	All	Con	25,553	48.00%	11,444	21.50%	62.14%	14,109	25,553	8,954	–	3,903	–	718	53,237
BC	Kootenay—Columbia	All	Con	21,336	52.02%	11,564	28.19%	65.09%	7,351	21,336	9,772	–	2,558	–	–	41,017
BC	Langley	All	Con	24,390	47.70%	11,741	22.96%	65.40%	12,649	24,390	8,568	–	3,108	2,422	–	51,137
BC	Nanaimo—Alberni	All	Con	23,158	39.07%	4,006	6.76%	68.26%	11,770	23,158	19,152	–	4,357	–	841	59,278
BC	Nanaimo—Cowichan	All	NDP	25,243	43.71%	6,315	10.94%	66.70%	9,257	18,928	25,243	–	3,822	229	270	57,749
BC	New Westminster—Coquitlam	All	Con	15,693	32.87%	113	0.24%	63.63%	13,080	15,693	15,580	–	2,684	–	700	47,737
BC	Newton—North Delta	All	Con	13,529	32.82%	520	1.26%	62.99%	13,009	13,529	12,037	–	2,555	–	98	41,228
BC	North Okanagan—Shuswap	All	Con	24,014	46.39%	11,486	22.19%	63.69%	11,636	24,014	12,528	–	2,333	505	749	51,765
BC	North Vancouver	All	Lib	22,619	40.03%	2,071	3.67%	68.16%	22,619	20,548	8,967	–	4,114	–	258	56,506
BC	Okanagan—Coquihalla	All	Con	24,220	49.79%	13,008	26.74%	63.55%	11,212	24,220	9,509	–	2,896	–	807	48,644
BC	Port Moody—Westwood—Port Coquitlam	All	Con	18,664	40.94%	6,219	13.64%	62.96%	12,445	18,664	12,023	–	1,971	–	481	45,584
BC	Prince George—Peace River	All	Con	21,281	58.71%	13,780	38.02%	53.56%	4,988	21,281	7,501	–	2,073	–	402	36,245
BC	Richmond	All	Lib	18,204	44.48%	3,747	9.16%	56.69%	18,204	14,457	6,142	–	1,743	–	376	40,922
BC	Saanich—Gulf Islands	All	Con	22,050	34.58%	4,968	7.79%	73.97%	17,082	22,050	13,763	–	10,662	214	–	63,771
BC	Skeena—Bulkley Valley	All	NDP	13,706	37.14%	1,272	3.45%	59.99%	7,965	12,434	13,706	–	1,225	–	1,569	36,899
BC	South Surrey—White Rock—Cloverdale	All	Con	22,760	42.67%	3,149	5.90%	69.43%	19,611	22,760	7,663	–	3,032	–	272	53,338
BC	Southern Interior	All	Con	16,940	36.60%	680	1.47%	66.82%	8,310	16,940	16,260	–	3,663	591	517	46,281
BC	Surrey North	All	Ind	15,089	43.80%	6,777	19.67%	55.40%	5,413	4,340	8,312	–	658	15,089	638	34,450
BC	Vancouver Centre	Lib	Lib	21,280	40.31%	4,230	8.01%	61.47%	21,280	10,139	17,050	–	3,580	–	744	52,793
BC	Vancouver East	NDP	NDP	23,452	56.46%	12,684	30.54%	58.16%	10,768	4,153	23,452	–	2,365	147	649	41,534
BC	Vancouver Island North	All	Con	18,733	35.41%	483	0.91%	65.79%	11,352	18,733	18,250	–	4,456	–	111	52,902
BC	Vancouver Kingsway	Lib	Lib	17,267	40.44%	1,351	3.16%	58.01%	17,267	7,037	15,916	–	1,521	548	408	42,697
BC	Vancouver Quadra	Lib	Lib	29,187	52.43%	14,539	26.12%	66.53%	29,187	14,648	8,348	–	3,118	–	364	55,665
BC	Vancouver South	Lib	Lib	18,196	44.52%	7,770	19.01%	55.82%	18,196	10,426	10,038	–	1,465	98	653	40,876
BC	Victoria	Lib	Lib	20,398	35.04%	2,305	3.96%	68.41%	20,398	12,708	18,093	–	6,807	–	206	58,212
BC	West Vancouver—Sunshine Coast	All	Con	21,372	35.30%	1,687	2.79%	66.00%	19,685	21,372	13,156	–	5,887	–	444	60,544
MB	Brandon—Souris	PC	Con	18,209	51.72%	9,687	27.52%	56.24%	8,522	18,209	6,740	–	1,264	–	469	35,204
MB	Charleswood—St. James	Lib	Con	18,688	44.29%	734	1.74%	65.45%	17,954	18,688	4,283	–	880	–	386	42,191
MB	Churchill	NDP	NDP	8,612	43.44%	1,008	5.08%	41.40%	7,604	2,999	8,612	–	612	–	–	19,827
MB	Dauphin—Swan River	All	Con	18,025	53.95%	10,684	31.98%	58.63%	6,809	18,025	7,341	–	673	–	560	33,408
MB	Elmwood—Transcona	NDP	NDP	15,221	51.99%	7,577	25.88%	50.65%	4,923	7,644	15,221	–	719	–	771	29,278
MB	Kildonan—St. Paul	Lib	Con	13,582	37.30%	278	0.76%	60.19%	13,304	13,582 (Note: Joy Smith was previously a member of the Legislative Assembly of Manitoba)	8,202	–	756	–	568	36,412
MB	Portage—Lisgar	All	Con	22,939	65.93%	16,765	48.18%	57.35%	6,174	22,939	3,251	–	856	–	1,575	34,795
MB	Provencher	All	Con	22,694	63.02%	13,719	38.09%	59.67%	8,975	22,694	3,244	–	1,100	–	–	36,013
MB	Saint Boniface	Lib	Lib	17,989	46.61%	6,033	15.63%	60.70%	17,989	11,956	6,954	–	925	–	772	38,596
MB	Selkirk—Interlake	All	Con	18,727	47.25%	8,211	20.72%	59.41%	9,059	18,727	10,516	–	982	–	353	39,637
MB	Winnipeg Centre	NDP	NDP	12,149	45.39%	2,864	10.70%	45.08%	9,285	3,631	12,149	–	1,151	92	460	26,768
MB	Winnipeg North	NDP	NDP	12,507	48.16%	3,016	11.61%	47.13%	9,491	3,186	12,507	–	531	–	252	25,967
MB	Winnipeg South	Lib	Lib	19,270	51.31%	6,500	17.31%	63.23%	19,270	12,770	4,217	–	1,003	–	296	37,556
MB	Winnipeg South Centre	Lib	Lib	18,133	46.60%	7,617	19.57%	62.64%	18,133	10,516	8,270	–	1,508	–	488	38,915
NB	Acadie—Bathurst	NDP	NDP	23,857	53.93%	9,405	21.26%	70.38%	14,452	4,841	23,857	–	1,085	–	–	44,235
NB	Beauséjour	Lib	Lib	21,934	53.28%	10,330	25.09%	68.29%	21,934	11,604	6,056	–	1,574	–	–	41,168
NB	Fredericton	Lib	Lib	19,819	46.78%	5,626	13.28%	61.82%	19,819	14,193	7,360	–	997	–	–	42,369
NB	Fundy	PC	Con	14,997	44.82%	3,362	10.05%	62.26%	11,635	14,997	5,417	–	1,051	358	–	33,458
NB	Madawaska—Restigouche	Lib	Lib	14,144	44.66%	5,407	17.07%	60.58%	14,144	7,605	8,737	–	1,185	–	–	31,671
NB	Miramichi	Lib	Lib	15,647	48.08%	6,199	19.05%	65.42%	15,647	9,448	5,980	–	1,468	–	–	32,543
NB	Moncton—Riverview—Dieppe	Lib	Lib	25,266	59.29%	15,263	35.82%	58.96%	25,266	10,003	5,344	–	1,998	–	–	42,611
NB	Saint John	PC	Lib	15,725	43.28%	3,513	9.67%	55.03%	15,725	12,212	6,926	–	807	290	369	36,329
NB	St. Croix—Belleisle	PC	Con	16,339	53.06%	6,637	21.55%	62.23%	9,702	16,339	3,600	–	960	–	194	30,795
NB	Tobique—Mactaquac	PC	Lib	16,787	48.23%	3,008	8.64%	64.00%	16,787	13,779	2,957	–	1,282	–	–	34,805
NL	Avalon	Lib	Lib	18,335	58.34%	9,124	29.03%	49.83%	18,335	9,211	3,450	–	430	–	–	31,426
NL	Bonavista—Exploits	Lib	Lib	15,970	48.20%	2,184	6.59%	46.30%	15,970	13,786	2,667	–	367	344	–	33,134
NL	Humber—St. Barbe—Baie Verte	Lib	Lib	17,820	62.56%	11,282	39.61%	47.77%	17,820	6,538	3,743	–	384	–	–	28,485
NL	Labrador	Lib	Lib	5,524	62.23%	4,124	46.46%	44.82%	5,524	1,400	856	–	178	919	–	8,877
NL	Random—Burin—St. George's	Lib	Lib	12,383	46.77%	3,586	13.55%	44.91%	12,383	4,820	8,797	–	474	–	–	26,474
NL	St. John's North	PC	Con	15,073	41.40%	1,730	4.75%	55.62%	13,343 (Note: Walter Noel was previously a member of the House of Assembly of Newfoundland and Labrador, as well as a provincial Cabinet minister.)	15,073	7,198	–	791	–	–	36,405
NL	St. John's South	PC	Con	13,330	39.57%	1,451	4.31%	52.30%	11,879	13,330	7,989	–	493	–	–	33,691
NS	Cape Breton—Canso	Lib	Lib	20,139	53.26%	10,942	28.94%	63.80%	20,139	7,654	9,197	–	820	–	–	37,810
NS	Central Nova	PC	Con	16,376	43.27%	5,906	15.60%	65.32%	9,986	16,376	10,470	–	1,015	–	–	37,847
NS	Dartmouth—Cole Harbour	NDP	Lib	17,425	42.07%	3,962	9.56%	61.93%	17,425	8,739	13,463	–	1,311	–	485	41,423
NS	Halifax	NDP	NDP	18,341	41.55%	1,074	2.43%	62.68%	17,267	6,457	18,341	–	2,081	–	–	44,146
NS	Halifax West	Lib	Lib	19,083	47.50%	7,855	19.55%	63.51%	19,083	8,413	11,228	–	1,452	–	–	40,176
NS	Kings—Hants	PC	Lib	17,555	46.61%	6,211	16.49%	62.42%	17,555	11,344	6,663	–	1,364	242	493	37,661
NS	North Nova	PC	Con	20,188	50.49%	9,597	24.00%	60.46%	10,591	20,188	7,560	–	1,245	–	399	39,983
NS	Sackville—Eastern Shore	NDP	NDP	17,925	45.77%	6,703	17.12%	60.55%	11,222	8,363	17,925	–	1,007	–	645	39,162
NS	South Shore—St. Margaret's	PC	Con	14,954	37.90%	2,296	5.82%	60.52%	12,658	14,954	10,140	–	1,700	–	–	39,452
NS	Sydney—Victoria	Lib	Lib	19,372	52.13%	9,074	24.42%	60.58%	19,372	5,897	10,298	–	855	264	474	37,160
NS	West Nova	PC	Lib	18,343	42.64%	4,134	9.61%	63.92%	18,343	14,209	9,086	–	1,385	–	–	43,023
ON	Ajax—Pickering	Lib	Lib	21,706	49.77%	7,040	16.14%	61.18%	21,706	14,666	5,286	–	1,951	–	–	43,609
ON	Algoma—Manitoulin—Kapuskasing	Lib	Lib	14,276	40.94%	3,225	9.25%	57.74%	14,276	8,093	11,051	–	1,449	–	–	34,869
ON	Ancaster—Dundas—Flamborough—Westdale	Lib	Lib	21,935	39.69%	2,800	5.07%	69.91%	21,935	19,135	11,557	–	2,636	–	–	55,263
ON	Barrie	Lib	Lib	21,233	42.66%	1,295	2.60%	61.17%	21,233	19,938	5,312	–	3,288	–	–	49,771
ON	Beaches—East York	Lib	Lib	22,494	47.93%	7,338	15.64%	64.02%	22,494	6,603	15,156	–	2,127	80	473	46,933
ON	Bramalea—Gore—Malton	Lib	Lib	20,394	49.54%	7,800	18.95%	54.87%	20,394	12,594	6,113	–	1,832	–	237	41,170
ON	Brampton—Springdale	Lib	Lib	19,385	47.73%	8,203	20.20%	54.85%	19,385	11,182	8,038	–	1,927	–	86	40,618
ON	Brampton West	Lib	Lib	21,254	45.30%	2,486	5.30%	54.75%	21,254	18,768 (Note: Tony Clement was a member of the Legislative Assembly of Ontario and a provincial Cabinet minister.)	4,920	–	1,603	371	–	46,916
ON	Brant	Lib	Lib	20,455	38.05%	2,663	4.95%	60.28%	20,455	17,792	11,826	–	2,738	373	570	53,754
ON	Burlington	Lib	Lib	27,423	44.96%	4,034	6.61%	68.80%	27,423	23,389	6,581	–	3,169	–	429	60,991
ON	Cambridge	Lib	Con	19,123	37.09%	224	0.43%	59.63%	18,899	19,123	10,392	–	2,506	248	395	51,563
ON	Carleton—Lanark	All	Con	32,664	50.04%	10,479	16.05%	75.43%	22,185	32,664	6,758	–	3,665	–	–	65,272
ON	Chatham-Kent—Essex	Lib	Lib	17,435	39.63%	407	0.93%	59.53%	17,435	17,028	7,538	–	1,845	–	150	43,996
ON	Clarington—Scugog—Uxbridge	Lib	Con	20,813	40.74%	1,265	2.48%	64.24%	19,548	20,813	7,721	–	2,085	–	915	51,082
ON	Davenport	Lib	Lib	16,773	50.69%	5,481	16.56%	52.89%	16,773	3,077	11,292	–	1,384	–	564	33,090
ON	Don Valley East	Lib	Lib	21,864	54.62%	10,658	26.63%	59.38%	21,864	11,206	5,287	–	1,172	–	500	40,029
ON	Don Valley West	Lib	Lib	30,615	59.79%	16,120	31.48%	66.31%	30,615	14,495	4,393	–	1,703	–	–	51,206
ON	Dufferin—Caledon	Lib	Con	19,270	42.81%	1,713	3.81%	60.73%	17,557	19,270 (Note: David Tilson was previously a member of the Legislative Assembly of Ontario.)	3,798	–	3,947	–	443	45,015
ON	Eglinton—Lawrence	Lib	Lib	28,360	60.24%	16,568	35.19%	63.77%	28,360	11,792	4,886	–	1,924	–	115	47,077
ON	Elgin—Middlesex—London	Lib	Con	20,333	43.84%	4,473	9.64%	61.44%	15,860	20,333	6,763	–	2,033	–	1,392	46,381
ON	Essex	Lib	Con	18,755	36.57%	829	1.62%	61.12%	17,926	18,755	12,519	–	1,981	–	105	51,286
ON	Etobicoke Centre	Lib	Lib	30,441	58.28%	15,612	29.89%	67.28%	30,441	14,829	5,174	–	1,676	–	112	52,232
ON	Etobicoke—Lakeshore	Lib	Lib	24,909	50.24%	9,750	19.67%	62.98%	24,909	15,159	7,179	–	2,201	–	129	49,577
ON	Etobicoke North	Lib	Lib	19,450	63.32%	13,713	44.64%	51.01%	19,450	5,737	3,761	–	605	309	856	30,718
ON	Glengarry—Prescott—Russell	Lib	Lib	23,921	47.86%	5,192	10.39%	67.04%	23,921	18,729	4,238	–	2,634	–	464	49,986
ON	Grey—Bruce—Owen Sound	Lib	Con	22,411	44.99%	4,587	9.21%	64.26%	17,824	22,411	6,516	–	2,076	–	982	49,809
ON	Guelph	Lib	Lib	23,442	44.61%	9,721	18.50%	64.18%	23,442	13,721	10,527	–	3,866	–	991	52,547
ON	Haldimand—Norfolk	Lib	Con	20,981	42.15%	1,645	3.30%	63.63%	19,336	20,981	7,143	–	1,703	–	617	49,780
ON	Haliburton—Kawartha Lakes—Brock	Lib	Con	24,731	44.23%	5,437	9.72%	64.22%	19,294	24,731	8,427	–	2,637	330	493	55,912
ON	Halton	Lib	Lib	27,362	48.35%	5,658	10.00%	65.18%	27,362	21,704	4,642	–	2,889	–	–	56,597
ON	Hamilton Centre	Lib	NDP	20,321	45.81%	5,373	12.11%	55.32%	14,948	6,714	20,321 (Note: David Christopherson was previously a member of the Legislative Assembly of Ontario.)	–	1,422	345	611	44,361
ON	Hamilton East—Stoney Creek	Lib	Lib	18,417	37.74%	927	1.90%	57.88%	18,417	10,888	17,490	–	1,446	393	166	48,800
ON	Hamilton Mountain	Lib	Lib	18,548	34.81%	996	1.87%	61.38%	18,548	15,590	17,552	–	1,378	–	214	53,282
ON	Huron—Bruce	Lib	Lib	25,538	49.79%	9,608	18.73%	66.74%	25,538	15,930	6,707	–	1,518	–	1,596	51,289
ON	Kenora	Lib	Lib	8,563	36.23%	986	4.17%	56.11%	8,563	6,598	7,577	–	898	–	–	23,636
ON	Kingston and the Islands	Lib	Lib	28,544	52.45%	15,962	29.33%	60.32%	28,544	12,582	8,964	–	3,339	337	660	54,426
ON	Kitchener Centre	Lib	Lib	21,264	47.13%	8,852	19.62%	58.56%	21,264	12,412	8,717	–	2,450	277	–	45,120
ON	Kitchener—Conestoga	Lib	Lib	17,819	42.29%	2,916	6.92%	58.24%	17,819	14,903	6,623	–	2,793	–	–	42,138
ON	Kitchener—Waterloo	Lib	Lib	28,015	48.12%	10,860	18.65%	65.80%	28,015	17,155	9,267	–	3,277	124	379	58,217
ON	Lanark—Frontenac—Lennox and Addington	Lib	Con	27,566	48.77%	10,059	17.80%	65.82%	17,507	27,566	7,418	–	2,736	820	479	56,526
ON	Leeds—Grenville	Lib	Con	26,002	50.46%	9,035	17.54%	70.38%	16,967	26,002	5,834	–	2,722	–	–	51,525
ON	London—Fanshawe	Lib	Lib	15,664	38.08%	3,153	7.66%	55.67%	15,664	10,811	12,511 (Note: Irene Mathyssen was previously a member of the Legislative Assembly of Ontario and a provincial Cabinet minister.)	–	1,634	–	518	41,138
ON	London North Centre	Lib	Lib	21,472	43.08%	7,795	15.64%	60.02%	21,472	13,677	12,034	–	2,376	–	287	49,846
ON	London West	Lib	Lib	25,061	45.48%	7,726	14.02%	65.27%	25,061	17,335	9,522	–	2,611	–	578	55,107
ON	Markham—Unionville	Lib	Lib	30,442	66.31%	20,117	43.82%	56.10%	30,442	10,325	3,993	–	1,148	–	–	45,908
ON	Middlesex—Kent—Lambton	Lib	Lib	19,452	39.73%	164	0.33%	62.99%	19,452	19,288	7,376	–	1,834	–	1,015	48,965
ON	Mississauga East—Cooksville	Lib	Lib	22,435	56.70%	12,136	30.67%	52.43%	22,435	10,299	4,619	–	1,167	114	932	39,566
ON	Mississauga South	Lib	Lib	24,628	51.67%	8,601	18.04%	63.07%	24,628	16,027	5,004	–	1,899	–	107	47,665
ON	Mississauga—Brampton South	Lib	Lib	24,753	57.16%	14,320	33.07%	53.84%	24,753	10,433	6,411	–	1,525	–	185	43,307
ON	Mississauga—Erindale	Lib	Lib	28,246	54.37%	11,646	22.42%	60.27%	28,246	16,600	5,104	–	1,855	–	145	51,950
ON	Mississauga—Streetsville	Lib	Lib	22,768	50.56%	8,481	18.83%	57.87%	22,768	14,287	4,266	–	2,415	–	1,293	45,029
ON	Nepean—Carleton	Lib	Con	30,420	45.66%	3,736	5.61%	75.07%	26,684	30,420	6,072	–	2,886	–	561	66,623
ON	Newmarket—Aurora	Lib	Con	21,818	42.42%	689	1.34%	66.97%	21,129	21,818	5,111	–	2,298	–	1,079	51,435
ON	Niagara Falls	Lib	Con	19,882	38.70%	1,137	2.21%	57.09%	18,745	19,882	10,680	–	2,071	–	–	51,378
ON	Niagara West—Glanbrook	Lib	Con	20,874	40.29%	664	1.28%	67.38%	20,210	20,874	7,681	–	1,761	–	1,286	51,812
ON	Nickel Belt	Lib	Lib	17,188	42.41%	3,208	7.92%	59.64%	17,188	7,628	13,980	–	1,031	217	481	40,525
ON	Nipissing—Timiskaming	Lib	Lib	18,254	42.31%	2,253	5.22%	62.45%	18,254	16,001 (Note: Al McDonald was previously a member of the Legislative Assembly of Ontario.)	7,354	–	1,329	–	204	43,142
ON	Northumberland—Quinte West	Lib	Lib	22,989	39.85%	313	0.54%	63.19%	22,989	22,676 (Note: Doug Galt was previously a member of the Legislative Assembly of Ontario.)	9,007	–	3,016	–	–	57,688
ON	Oak Ridges—Markham	Lib	Lib	31,964	51.73%	11,252	18.21%	63.38%	31,964	20,712	5,430	–	2,406	–	1,278	61,790
ON	Oakville	Lib	Lib	28,729	52.01%	9,205	16.66%	69.46%	28,729	19,524	4,027	–	2,861	–	95	55,236
ON	Oshawa	Lib	Con	15,815	33.21%	463	0.97%	57.20%	14,510	15,815	15,352	–	1,850	–	91	47,618
ON	Ottawa Centre	Lib	NDP	25,734	41.05%	6,256	9.98%	70.35%	19,478	11,933	25,734	–	4,730	121	688	62,684
ON	Ottawa—Orléans	Lib	Lib	26,383	44.99%	2,728	4.65%	73.63%	26,383	23,655	5,905	–	2,699	–	–	58,642
ON	Ottawa South	Lib	Lib	25,956	43.82%	5,334	9.01%	69.67%	25,956	20,622	8,080	–	3,398	225	949	59,230
ON	Ottawa—Vanier	Lib	Lib	25,952	49.17%	13,183	24.98%	64.24%	25,952	12,769	9,787	–	3,628	–	643	52,779
ON	Ottawa West—Nepean	Lib	Lib	23,971	41.78%	1,380	2.41%	70.04%	23,971	22,591	7,449	–	2,748	–	619	57,378
ON	Oxford	Lib	Con	20,606	44.89%	6,595	14.37%	63.13%	14,011	20,606	6,673	–	1,951	–	2,662	45,903
ON	Parkdale—High Park	Lib	Lib	19,727	42.05%	3,526	7.52%	64.14%	19,727	7,221	16,201	–	3,249	–	514	46,912
ON	Parry Sound-Muskoka	Lib	Lib	19,271	43.86%	3,301	7.51%	64.03%	19,271	15,970	5,171	–	3,524	–	–	43,936
ON	Perth Wellington	Lib	Con	18,879	41.97%	3,847	8.55%	61.78%	15,032	18,879	7,027	–	2,770	–	1,273	44,981
ON	Peterborough	Lib	Lib	25,099	43.55%	6,706	11.64%	65.19%	25,099	18,393	10,957	–	3,182	–	–	57,631
ON	Pickering—Scarborough East	Lib	Lib	27,312	56.98%	13,895	28.99%	64.27%	27,312	13,417	5,392	–	1,809	–	–	47,930
ON	Prince Edward—Hastings	Lib	Con	22,598	42.36%	2,556	4.79%	62.59%	20,042	22,598	8,105	–	2,130	468	–	53,343
ON	Renfrew—Nipissing—Pembroke	All	Con	27,494	55.08%	12,696	25.43%	67.08%	14,798	27,494	5,720	–	1,191	–	714	49,917
ON	Richmond Hill	Lib	Lib	27,102	58.48%	15,572	33.60%	58.25%	27,102	11,530	4,495	–	2,144	–	1,074	46,345
ON	St. Catharines	Lib	Lib	21,277	40.44%	3,016	5.73%	62.03%	21,277	18,261	10,135	–	1,927	–	1,016	52,616
ON	St. Paul's	Lib	Lib	32,171	58.39%	20,945	38.02%	68.12%	32,171	11,226	8,667	–	3,031	–	–	55,095
ON	Sarnia—Lambton	Lib	Lib	19,932	41.93%	5,432	11.43%	60.95%	19,932	14,500	7,764	–	2,548	978	1,819	47,541
ON	Sault Ste. Marie	Lib	NDP	16,512	38.29%	752	1.74%	63.36%	15,760	9,969	16,512 (Note: Tony Martin was previously a member of the Legislative Assembly of Ontario.)	–	814	–	67	43,122
ON	Scarborough—Agincourt	Lib	Lib	26,400	64.08%	17,751	43.09%	56.44%	26,400	8,649	4,182	–	919	–	1,048	41,198
ON	Scarborough Centre	Lib	Lib	20,740	56.65%	12,225	33.39%	55.40%	20,740	8,515	6,156	–	1,045	–	152	36,608
ON	Scarborough-Guildwood	Lib	Lib	20,950	57.53%	12,673	34.80%	55.26%	20,950	8,277	5,885	–	1,106	–	200	36,418
ON	Scarborough—Rouge River	Lib	Lib	22,564	57.92%	15,602	40.05%	51.08%	22,564	5,184	3,635	–	610	6,962 (Note: Raymond Cho identified himself as an Independent-Liberal)	–	38,955
ON	Scarborough Southwest	Lib	Lib	18,776	49.46%	9,748	25.68%	57.16%	18,776	9,028	8,471	–	1,520	–	168	37,963
ON	Simcoe—Grey	Lib	Con	22,496	40.62%	100	0.18%	63.15%	22,396	22,496	5,532	–	2,668	–	2,285	55,377
ON	Simcoe North	Lib	Lib	23,664	43.36%	3,094	5.67%	64.65%	23,664	20,570	6,162	–	3,486	–	689	54,571
ON	Stormont—Dundas—South Glengarry	Lib	Con	21,678	44.85%	3,899	8.07%	64.54%	17,779	21,678	5,387	–	3,491	–	–	48,335
ON	Sudbury	Lib	Lib	18,914	44.19%	6,133	14.33%	60.08%	18,914	9,008	12,781	–	1,999	–	100	42,802
ON	Thornhill	Lib	Lib	28,709	54.58%	10,584	20.12%	62.69%	28,709	18,125	3,671	–	1,622	474	–	52,601
ON	Thunder Bay—Rainy River	Lib	Lib	14,290	39.37%	3,509	9.67%	57.22%	14,290	9,559	10,781	–	856	–	814	36,300
ON	Thunder Bay—Superior North	Lib	Lib	15,022	43.04%	4,792	13.73%	56.27%	15,022	7,394	10,230	–	1,614	–	645	34,905
ON	Timmins-James Bay	Lib	NDP	14,138	41.45%	613	1.80%	55.38%	13,525	5,682	14,138	–	767	–	–	34,112
ON	Toronto Centre	Lib	Lib	30,336	56.53%	17,589	32.78%	63.29%	30,336	7,936	12,747	–	2,097	–	547	53,663
ON	Toronto—Danforth	Lib	NDP	22,198	46.34%	2,395	5.00%	64.10%	19,803	2,975	22,198	–	2,575	–	349	47,900
ON	Trinity—Spadina	Lib	Lib	23,202	43.55%	805	1.51%	63.71%	23,202	4,605	22,397	–	2,259	89	724	53,276
ON	Vaughan	Lib	Lib	31,430	62.96%	19,609	39.28%	56.01%	31,430	11,821	4,371	–	1,722	–	580	49,924
ON	Welland	Lib	Lib	19,642	39.63%	5,019	10.13%	59.90%	19,642	12,997	14,623	–	1,454	–	848	49,564
ON	Wellington—Halton Hills	Lib	Con	21,479	42.81%	2,306	4.60%	67.03%	19,173	21,479	5,974 (Note: Noel Duignan was previously a member of the Legislative Assembly of Ontario.)	–	2,725	–	826	50,177
ON	Whitby—Oshawa	Lib	Lib	25,649	45.04%	5,118	8.99%	64.08%	25,649	20,531	8,002	–	2,759	–	–	56,941
ON	Willowdale	Lib	Lib	30,855	61.39%	19,240	38.28%	60.92%	30,855	11,615	4,812	–	1,844	253	883	50,262
ON	Windsor—Tecumseh	Lib	NDP	20,037	41.85%	3,818	7.97%	57.58%	16,219	9,827	20,037	–	1,613	–	182	47,878
ON	Windsor West	Lib	NDP	20,297	45.97%	6,466	14.64%	54.09%	13,831	8,348	20,297	–	1,545	–	134	44,155
ON	York Centre	Lib	Lib	21,520	54.79%	11,202	28.52%	56.77%	21,520	10,318	5,376	–	1,240	824	–	39,278
ON	York—Simcoe	Lib	Con	21,343	45.17%	4,580	9.69%	59.30%	16,763	21,343	5,314	–	2,576	–	1,258	47,254
ON	York South—Weston	Lib	Lib	20,537	59.83%	13,256	38.62%	51.71%	20,537	5,133	7,281	–	1,199	–	175	34,325
ON	York West	Lib	Lib	17,903	64.74%	13,675	49.45%	48.49%	17,903	3,120	4,228	–	824	–	1,580	27,655
PE	Cardigan	Lib	Lib	11,064	53.38%	4,175	20.14%	75.44%	11,064	6,889	2,103	–	670	–	–	20,726
PE	Charlottetown	Lib	Lib	9,175	49.36%	4,054	21.81%	67.30%	9,175	5,121	3,428	–	760	–	105	18,589
PE	Egmont	Lib	Lib	10,220	55.44%	4,857	26.35%	67.41%	10,220	5,363	2,133	–	717	–	–	18,433
PE	Malpeque	Lib	Lib	9,782	51.90%	3,656	19.40%	73.01%	9,782	6,126	1,902	–	1,037	–	–	18,847
QC	Abitibi—Témiscamingue	BQ	BQ	25,041	57.66%	11,584	26.67%	55.53%	13,457	2,425	1,472	25,041	1,037	–	–	43,432
QC	Ahuntsic	Lib	Lib	21,234	43.76%	1,214	2.50%	64.20%	21,234	2,544	3,013	20,020	1,301	–	416	48,528
QC	Alfred-Pellan	Lib	BQ	26,239	49.20%	5,123	9.61%	67.95%	21,116	2,703	1,849	26,239	1,132	293	–	53,332
QC	Argenteuil—Mirabel	BQ	BQ	28,228	57.40%	15,014	30.53%	60.33%	13,214	3,460	1,493	28,228	2,510	–	271	49,176
QC	Beauce	Lib	Lib	19,592	41.38%	2,424	5.12%	59.50%	19,592	8,091	1,443	17,168	1,054	–	–	47,348
QC	Beauharnois—Salaberry	Lib	BQ	26,775	50.67%	8,482	16.05%	64.26%	18,293	4,864	1,018	26,775	1,415	–	480	52,845
QC	Beauport	BQ	BQ	22,989	49.65%	11,123	24.02%	56.68%	11,866	7,388	1,896	22,989	1,577	–	585	46,301
QC	Berthier—Maskinongé	BQ	BQ	29,432	59.90%	18,234	37.11%	60.33%	11,198	5,535	1,653	29,432	1,314	–	–	49,132
QC	Bourassa	Lib	Lib	20,927	50.03%	5,133	12.27%	57.00%	20,927	2,226	1,661	15,794	660	–	557	41,825
QC	Brome—Missisquoi	Lib	Lib	18,609	42.08%	1,072	2.42%	62.63%	18,609	4,888	1,177	17,537	2,011	–	–	44,222
QC	Brossard—La Prairie	Lib	Lib	24,155	45.90%	2,559	4.86%	63.65%	24,155	3,107	2,321	21,596	1,340	–	109	52,628
QC	Chambly—Borduas	BQ	BQ	33,945	60.85%	21,251	38.09%	67.00%	12,694	4,219	2,681	33,945	2,248	–	–	55,787
QC	Charlesbourg	BQ	BQ	23,886	51.60%	11,975	25.87%	62.31%	11,911	7,306	1,623	23,886	1,188	–	376	46,290
QC	Charlevoix—Montmorency	BQ	BQ	25,451	60.91%	16,853	40.33%	58.25%	8,598	5,259	1,055	25,451	1,422	–	–	41,785
QC	Châteauguay—Saint-Constant	BQ	BQ	29,337	57.28%	13,953	27.24%	64.63%	15,384	2,902	1,704	29,337	1,889	–	–	51,216
QC	Chicoutimi—Le Fjord	Lib	BQ	20,650	45.33%	863	1.89%	58.80%	19,787	2,385	1,699	20,650	1,038	–	–	45,559
QC	Compton—Stanstead	Lib	BQ	20,450	46.70%	4,698	10.73%	60.27%	15,752	4,589	1,451	20,450	1,546	–	–	43,788
QC	Drummond	BQ	BQ	23,670	56.29%	14,079	33.48%	61.33%	9,591	7,123	745	23,670	921	–	–	42,050
QC	Gaspésie—Îles-de-la-Madeleine	Lib	BQ	21,446	55.67%	8,867	23.02%	56.57%	12,579	2,636	805	21,446	1,060	–	–	38,526
QC	Gatineau	Lib	Lib	19,198	42.09%	830	1.82%	56.61%	19,198	3,461	2,610	18,368	1,402	–	578	45,617
QC	Hochelaga	BQ	BQ	27,476	60.12%	15,764	34.50%	57.79%	11,712	1,856	2,510	27,476	1,361	–	784	45,699
QC	Honoré-Mercier	Lib	Lib	22,223	46.10%	2,762	5.73%	61.64%	22,223	2,902	1,973	19,461	852	–	790	48,201
QC	Hull—Aylmer	Lib	Lib	20,135	41.87%	4,509	9.38%	58.40%	20,135	3,963	5,709	15,626	2,561	–	98	48,092
QC	Jeanne-Le Ber	Lib	Lib	18,766	41.09%	72	0.16%	55.22%	18,766	2,524	3,160	18,694	1,864	–	668	45,676
QC	Joliette	BQ	BQ	30,661	63.42%	19,686	40.72%	60.38%	10,975	3,107	1,755	30,661	1,147	–	701	48,346
QC	Jonquière—Alma	BQ	BQ	25,193	54.93%	11,838	25.81%	59.19%	13,355	2,217	1,561	25,193	679	2,737	121	45,863
QC	La Pointe-de-l'Île	BQ	BQ	30,713	66.47%	20,120	43.55%	59.18%	10,593 (Note: Jean-Claude Gobé was previously a member of the National Assembly of Quebec.)	1,961	1,751	30,713	1,186	–	–	46,204
QC	Lac-Saint-Louis	Lib	Lib	32,122	63.91%	26,040	51.81%	63.37%	32,122	6,082	3,789	5,106	2,584	–	578	50,261
QC	LaSalle—Émard	Lib	Lib	25,806	56.55%	11,805	25.87%	59.61%	25,806	2,271	1,995	14,001	1,000	–	559	45,632
QC	Laurentides—Labelle	BQ	BQ	28,675	58.38%	14,216	28.94%	59.22%	14,459	2,887	1,320	28,675	1,781	–	–	49,122
QC	Laurier	BQ	BQ	28,728	60.07%	20,274	42.39%	60.10%	8,454	1,224	5,779	28,728	2,912	–	726	47,823
QC	Laval	BQ	BQ	24,425	50.09%	6,786	13.92%	62.05%	17,639	3,115	1,998	24,425	1,091	–	492	48,760
QC	Laval—Les Îles	Lib	Lib	23,985	47.86%	5,388	10.75%	61.84%	23,985	3,498	2,202	18,597	1,178	–	652	50,112
QC	Lévis—Bellechasse	BQ	BQ	21,930	44.34%	8,266	16.71%	59.61%	13,664	9,425	1,910	21,930	2,372	–	163	49,464
QC	Longueuil	BQ	BQ	29,473	60.94%	17,110	35.38%	64.14%	12,363	2,354	2,512	29,473	1,263	–	401	48,366
QC	Lotbinière—Chutes-de-la-Chaudière	BQ	BQ	20,245	45.99%	9,617	21.84%	60.42%	9,445	10,628	2,091	20,245	1,615	–	–	44,024
QC	Louis-Hébert	Lib	BQ	24,071	43.11%	5,072	9.08%	68.96%	18,999	7,512	3,112	24,071	2,137	–	–	55,831
QC	Louis-Saint-Laurent	Lib	BQ	17,248	38.44%	3,281	7.31%	59.39%	10,025	13,967	1,369	17,248	1,243	895 (Note: Jean-Guy Carignan, previously elected as the Liberal incumbent in Quebec East, received 563 votes.)	119	44,866
QC	Manicouagan	BQ	BQ	19,040	58.51%	10,943	33.63%	50.86%	8,097	1,601	3,361	19,040	444	–	–	32,543
QC	Marc-Aurèle-Fortin	BQ	BQ	30,779	58.88%	16,288	31.16%	67.55%	14,491	3,125	1,867	30,779	2,012	–	–	52,274
QC	Matapédia—Matane	BQ	BQ	17,878	56.45%	8,225	25.97%	54.20%	9,653	1,972	1,581	17,878	585	–	–	31,669
QC	Mégantic—L'Érable	Lib	BQ	19,264	44.74%	3,486	8.10%	63.01%	15,778	4,916	1,608	19,264 (Note: Marc Boulianne was previously a member of the National Assembly of Quebec and a Quebec Cabinet minister.)	1,489	–	–	43,055
QC	Montcalm	BQ	BQ	34,383	71.24%	26,468	54.84%	59.22%	7,915	2,831	1,531	34,383	1,606	–	–	48,266
QC	Mount Royal	Lib	Lib	28,670	75.68%	25,399	67.04%	53.40%	28,670	3,271	1,859	2,636	1,046	–	402	37,884
QC	Notre-Dame-de-Grâce—Lachine	Lib	Lib	23,552	53.20%	13,816	31.21%	57.68%	23,552	4,526	3,513	9,736	2,214	–	732	44,273
QC	Nunavik—Eeyou	Lib	BQ	12,578	45.23%	572	2.06%	49.61%	12,006	1,265	1,097	12,578	862	–	–	27,808
QC	Outremont	Lib	Lib	15,675	40.94%	2,945	7.69%	56.13%	15,675	2,284	5,382	12,730	1,643	–	572	38,286
QC	Papineau	Lib	Lib	16,892	41.10%	468	1.14%	57.07%	16,892	1,961	3,603	16,424	1,058	250	911	41,099
QC	Pierrefonds—Dollard	Lib	Lib	29,601	63.57%	22,175	47.62%	58.76%	29,601	5,010	2,545	7,426	1,401	–	582	46,565
QC	Pontiac	Lib	Lib	15,358	38.36%	3,673	9.17%	53.04%	15,358	8,869	2,317	11,685	1,673	–	132	40,034
QC	Portneuf	Lib	BQ	18,471	42.91%	6,608	15.35%	61.68%	11,863	9,251	1,540	18,471	1,925	–	–	43,050
QC	Québec	BQ	BQ	24,373	50.63%	11,391	23.66%	60.77%	12,982	5,330	2,670	24,373	2,046	–	735	48,136
QC	Repentigny	BQ	BQ	35,907	70.06%	26,554	51.81%	64.27%	9,353	2,447	1,526	35,907	1,482	–	539	51,254
QC	Richelieu	BQ	BQ	31,497	64.67%	20,452	41.99%	66.06%	11,045	3,726	1,017	31,497	839	–	580	48,704
QC	Richmond—Arthabaska	PC	BQ	26,211	55.55%	13,402	28.40%	62.20%	12,809 (Note: The Liberal candidate Christine St-Pierre had been endorsed by the outgoing PC (subsequently Independent) incumbent André Bachand.)	4,925	1,540	26,211	1,699	–	–	47,184
QC	Rimouski—Témiscouata	BQ	BQ	22,215	57.63%	13,054	33.87%	58.05%	9,161	3,445	2,717	22,215	1,008	–	–	38,546
QC	Rivière-des-Mille-Îles	BQ	BQ	27,993	61.39%	16,968	37.21%	64.81%	11,025	3,064	1,559	27,993	1,961	–	–	45,602
QC	Rivière-du-Loup—Montmagny	BQ	BQ	25,327	57.13%	12,203	27.53%	57.61%	13,124	4,040	876	25,327	962	–	–	44,329
QC	Rivière-du-Nord	BQ	BQ	29,204	66.33%	19,695	44.73%	59.71%	9,509	2,435	1,290	29,204	1,129	–	459	44,026
QC	Roberval	BQ	BQ	20,655	59.41%	12,591	36.22%	55.84%	8,064	3,011	1,777	20,655	1,260	–	–	34,767
QC	Rosemont—La Petite-Patrie	BQ	BQ	31,224	61.80%	19,652	38.90%	61.54%	11,572	1,561	3,876	31,224	2,145	–	145	50,523
QC	Saint-Bruno—Saint-Hubert	BQ	BQ	28,050	55.11%	12,593	24.74%	66.10%	15,457	3,189	2,253	28,050	1,349	–	596	50,894
QC	Saint-Hyacinthe—Bagot	BQ	BQ	29,789	62.40%	19,231	40.28%	64.77%	10,558	5,240	1,204	29,789	948	–	–	47,739
QC	Saint-Jean	BQ	BQ	29,485	60.11%	16,756	34.16%	64.75%	12,729	3,856	1,687	29,485	1,298	–	–	49,055
QC	Saint-Lambert	Lib	BQ	22,024	48.84%	5,370	11.91%	60.38%	16,654	2,739	2,130	22,024	1,404	–	145	45,096
QC	Saint-Laurent—Cartierville	Lib	Lib	28,107	66.82%	20,846	49.56%	54.28%	28,107	2,606	2,630	7,261	875	–	585	42,064
QC	Saint-Léonard—Saint-Michel	Lib	Lib	25,884	63.90%	17,032	42.05%	54.52%	25,884	2,138	2,422	8,852	944	–	267	40,507
QC	Saint-Maurice—Champlain	Lib	BQ	25,918	55.29%	11,598	24.74%	60.16%	14,320	4,129	1,104	25,918 (Note: Marcel Gagnon was previously a member of the National Assembly of Quebec.)	855	–	547	46,873
QC	Shefford	Lib	BQ	21,968	46.60%	3,243	6.88%	62.95%	18,725	3,732	1,146	21,968	1,571	–	–	47,142
QC	Sherbrooke	BQ	BQ	29,323	58.74%	13,841	27.73%	62.66%	15,482	2,142	1,463	29,323	1,509	–	–	49,919
QC	Terrebonne—Blainville	BQ	BQ	31,288	68.13%	22,240	48.43%	63.58%	9,048	2,582	1,451	31,288	1,554	–	–	45,923
QC	Trois-Rivières	BQ	BQ	26,240	56.51%	13,537	29.15%	62.17%	12,703	4,381	1,635	26,240	1,476	–	–	46,435
QC	Vaudreuil-Soulanges	Lib	BQ	24,675	44.29%	3,062	5.50%	66.82%	21,613	4,558	2,175	24,675	2,103	–	585	55,709
QC	Verchères—Les Patriotes	BQ	BQ	33,333	67.62%	23,375	47.42%	69.66%	9,958	2,750	1,815	33,333	975	–	463	49,294
QC	Westmount—Ville-Marie	Lib	Lib	22,337	55.84%	16,415	41.04%	52.00%	22,337	4,027	4,795	5,922	2,419	–	499	39,999
SK	Battlefords—Lloydminster	All	Con	15,441	58.25%	10,074	38.01%	51.65%	4,617	15,441	5,367	–	766	–	316	26,507
SK	Blackstrap	All	Con	15,608	41.48%	3,793	10.08%	63.90%	11,815	15,608	8,862	–	1,168	–	177	37,630
SK	Churchill River	Lib	Con	7,279	37.39%	1,464	7.52%	47.41%	5,815	7,279	3,910	–	539	1,923	–	19,466
SK	Cypress Hills—Grasslands	All	Con	18,010	60.64%	12,463	41.96%	63.04%	5,547	18,010	4,901	–	1,243	–	–	29,701
SK	Palliser (Note: Application withdrawn upon the court not finding any supporting evidence.)	NDP	Con	11,909	35.85%	124	0.37%	64.42%	8,244	11,909	11,785	–	829	–	451	33,218
SK	Prince Albert	All	Con	13,576	47.28%	6,355	22.13%	53.48%	6,929	13,576	7,221	–	987	–	–	28,713
SK	Regina—Lumsden—Lake Centre (Note: Recount terminated on request of applicant. There was also an application alleging election irregularities, but this was withdrawn upon the court not finding any supporting evidence.)	All	Con	10,289	33.21%	122	0.39%	62.81%	10,167	10,289	8,300	–	716	1,506	–	30,978
SK	Regina—Qu'Appelle	NDP	Con	10,012	35.76%	861	3.08%	56.23%	7,793	10,012	9,151	–	639	106	293	27,994
SK	Saskatoon—Humboldt	All	Con	9,444	26.75%	417	1.18%	62.97%	9,009	9,444	9,027	–	680	7,147 (Note: Jim Pankiw, previously elected as the Alliance incumbent, received 7,076 votes.)	–	35,307
SK	Saskatoon—Rosetown—Biggar	NDP	Con	11,875	44.84%	2,278	8.60%	52.52%	4,171	11,875	9,597	–	841	–	–	26,484
SK	Saskatoon—Wanuskewin	All	Con	15,109	46.64%	4,556	14.07%	59.72%	10,553	15,109	5,770	–	960	–	–	32,392
SK	Souris—Moose Mountain	All	Con	11,306	36.90%	2,907	9.49%	62.99%	6,001	11,306	4,202	–	537	8,399 (Note: Grant Devine, previously a member of the Legislative Assembly of Saskatchewan and a form Premier of Saskatchewan.)	191	30,636
SK	Wascana	Lib	Lib	20,567	57.17%	11,858	32.96%	63.14%	20,567	8,709	5,771	–	928	–	–	35,975
SK	Yorkton—Melville	All	Con	19,940	62.94%	14,050	44.35%	60.19%	4,697	19,940	5,890	–	630	524	–	31,681
Terr	Nunavut	Lib	Lib	3,818	51.30%	2,646	35.55%	43.86%	3,818	1,075	1,129	–	248	1,172 (Note: Manitok Thompson, previously a member of the Legislative Assembly of the Northwest Territories.)	–	7,442
Terr	Western Arctic	Lib	Lib	5,317	39.45%	53	0.39%	47.33%	5,317	2,314	5,264	–	583	–	–	13,478
Terr	Yukon	Lib	Lib	5,724	45.69%	2,508	20.02%	61.82%	5,724	2,618	3,216	–	571	–	399	12,528

= went to a judicial recount
= election contested on grounds of irregularities
= turnout is above national average
= Incumbent had switched allegiance
= Not incumbent; was previously elected to the House
= Incumbency arose from by-election gain
= Multiple candidates

=== Analysis ===
Ternary plots - shift of electoral support (2000-2004)
2000

2004
Electoral districts identified by colours of winning parties

=== Results by province ===
Party name		BC	AB	SK	MB	ON	QC	NB	NS	PE	NL	NU	NT	YK	Total
Liberal	Seats:	8	2	1	3	75	21	7	6	4	5	1	1	1	135
Liberal	Popular vote:	28.6	22.0	27.2	33.2	44.7	33.9	44.6	39.7	52.5	48.0	51.3	39.4	45.7	36.7
Conservative	Seats:	22	26	13	7	24	-	2	3	-	2	-	-	-	99
Conservative	Vote:	36.3	61.7	41.8	39.1	31.5	8.8	31.1	28.0	30.7	32.3	14.4	17.2	20.9	29.6
Bloc Québécois	Seats:						54								54
Bloc Québécois	Vote:						48.9								12.4
New Democratic	Seats:	5	-	-	4	7	-	1	2	-	-	-	-	-	19
New Democratic	Vote:	26.6	9.5	23.4	23.5	18.1	4.6	20.6	28.4	12.5	17.5	15.2	39.1	25.7	15.7
No Affiliation	Seats:	1		-		-									1
No Affiliation	Vote:	1.0		x		x									0.1
Total seats:		36	28	14	14	106	75	10	11	4	7	1	1	1	308
Parties that won no seats:
Green	Vote:	6.3	6.1	2.7	2.7	4.4	3.2	3.4	3.3	4.2	1.6	3.3	4.3	4.6	4.3
Christian Heritage	Vote:	0.3	0.2	0.3	0.9	0.5	x		0.1	0.1				0.8	0.3
Marijuana	Vote:	0.2	0.2		0.4	0.2	0.4	0.1	0.1					2.4	0.2
Progressive Canadian	Vote:		x			0.2		0.3							0.1
Marxist–Leninist	Vote:	0.1	x			0.1	0.1		x						0.1
Canadian Action	Vote:	0.3	0.1		x	x	x	0.1							0.1
Communist	Vote:	0.1	x		0.9	x	x								x
Libertarian	Vote:	0.1				x	x								x
Independents	Vote:	0.3	x	4.6	x	0.3	0.1	0.2	0.1		0.6	15.7			0.3

Source: Elections Canada

=== 10 closest ridings ===
1. Western Arctic, NT: Ethel Blondin-Andrew (Lib) def. Dennis Bevington (NDP) by 53 votes
2. Jeanne-Le Ber, QC: Liza Frulla (Lib) def. Thierry St-Cyr (BQ) by 72 votes
3. Simcoe—Grey, ON: Helena Guergis (Cons) def. Paul Bonwick (Lib) by 100 votes
4. New Westminster—Coquitlam, BC: Paul Forseth (Cons) def. Steve McClurg (NDP) by 113 votes
5. Regina—Lumsden—Lake Centre, SK: Tom Lukiwski (Cons) def. Gary Anderson (Lib) by 122 votes
6. Palliser, SK: Dave Batters (Cons) def. Dick Proctor (NDP) by 124 votes
7. Edmonton—Beaumont, AB: David Kilgour (Lib) def. Tim Uppal (Cons) by 134 votes
8. Cambridge, ON: Gary Goodyear (Cons) def. Janko Peric (Lib) by 224 votes
9. Kildonan—St. Paul, MB: Joy Smith (Cons) def. Terry Duguid (Lib) by 278 votes
10. Northumberland—Quinte West, ON: Paul Macklin (Lib) def. Doug Galt (Cons) by 313 votes

== Allegations of coalition talks ==
On March 26, 2011, Gilles Duceppe stated that Harper had tried to form a coalition government with the Bloc and NDP two months after the 2004 election. He was responding to Harper's warnings in 2011 that the Liberals might form a coalition with the Bloc and the NDP.

== See also ==
- Timeline of the 2004 Canadian federal election

Leadership elections of 2003 and 2004:

- 2004 Conservative Party of Canada leadership election
- 2003 Liberal Party of Canada leadership election
- 2003 Progressive Conservative leadership election
- 2003 New Democratic Party leadership election

Articles on parties' candidates in this election:

- Canadian Action
- Christian Heritage
- Communists
- Conservatives
- Green
- Independents
- Marijuana Party
- Marxist-Leninists
- New Democrats
- Progressive Canadians

Other articles:

- List of Canadian federal general elections
- List of elections in the Province of Canada (pre-Confederation)
- Politics of Canada
- List of political parties in Canada
- Minority governments in Canada
