= Canadian Action Party candidates in the 2004 Canadian federal election =

The Canadian Action Party ran a number of candidates in the 2004 federal election, none of whom were elected. Information about these candidates may be found here.

== Manitoba ==
=== Magnus Thompson (Winnipeg South Centre) ===
Thompson received 114 votes, finishing sixth against Liberal incumbent Anita Neville.

== Ontario ==
=== Corrinne Prévost (Eglinton—Lawrence) ===
Prévost was born in Montreal, Quebec and raised in Hearst, Ontario in Northern Ontario. She is a singer in Toronto, Ontario, performing Italian, Portuguese and French material, as well as a jazz repertoire. In 1992, she adapted a French language version of the composition "A Song For Canada", which was performed at the official celebrations of Canada's 125th anniversary.

She joined the Progressive Conservative Party to support David Orchard's leadership campaign, and later joined the Canadian Action Party. She received 115 votes (0.24%), finishing fifth against Liberal incumbent Joe Volpe.

=== Don Rogers (Kingston and the Islands) ===
Rogers received 179 votes (0.33%) to finish seventh against Liberal incumbent Peter Milliken.

=== Jane Elizabeth Paxton (St. Catharines) ===
Paxton has a Bachelor of Arts degree in Psychology from the University of Guelph. She worked as a social services administrator after graduating, and later started her own private business. Her campaign emphasized both economic and social justice issues, and she argued that the Canadian Bank Act of 1974 gave too much control to the country's banking institutions. She received 204 votes (0.39%), finishing sixth against Liberal incumbent Walt Lastewka.

=== Tristan Downe-Dewdney (Trinity—Spadina) ===
Tristan Alexander Downe-Dewdney was a spokesperson for the Canadian Caregivers Association in 2009 - advocating for caregiver rights and protection in the media and at Parliament.

Downe-Dewdney was the previously the president and founder of Free Speech Canada, a minor Canadian advocacy organization. This group actively promoted the right to freedom of expression for Canadian citizens until the conclusion of the Macleans free speech case involving Mark Stein came to a satisfactory conclusion for the organization.

Tristan ran unsuccessfully for election to the House of Commons of Canada in the 2004 federal election in Trinity--Spadina riding in Toronto as a candidate for the Canadian Action Party - hoping to help the party meet pre-2004 party-status stipulations in its legal challenge against the minimum vote requirements in bill C-24.

In Sackville, New Brunswick, Tristan used to host the show Canadian Frames. Broadcast by CHMA 106.9 FM, the show's focus was on Canadian politics and news. The show came to an end in 2004.

=== Walter Aolari (Vaughan) ===
Aolari is a mechanical design engineer. He received a Master of Mechanical Engineering degree from the Polytechnic University of Bucharest in Romania in 1981, and was occasionally involved with local politics in that country. He left Romania in 1990, moved to Canada, and received another Master of Mechanical Engineering degree from the University of Toronto in 1994. In the same year, he was certified as a Professional Engineer. He has been involved in mechanical designing and project engineering for several industries in the Greater Toronto Area, and has been a member of the Canadian Action Party since 2000.

He first campaigned for the CAP in the 2000 federal election, and received 336 votes (0.94%) for a fifth-place finish against Liberal incumbent Tom Wappel. In 2004, he received 192 votes for a sixth-place finish against Liberal Maurizio Bevilacqua.
