= Opinion polling for the 2004 Canadian federal election =

Polls leading up to the 2004 Canadian federal election.

== Graphical summary ==
Voting intentions during the 2004 Canadian federal election campaign Liberal Party of Canada Conservative Party of Canada NDP Bloc québécois Green Party of Canada

== National polls ==
Evolution of voting intentions at national level
Last day of survey	LPC	CPC	NDP	BQ	GPC	Polling firm	Sample	ME	Source
Voting results	36.7	29.6	15.7	12.4	4.3				
June 24, 2004	33	32	17	13	5	Léger	2,407	± 2.0	PDF
June 24, 2004	34	30	20	12	4	SES	600	± 4.1	PDF
June 24, 2004	32.6	31.8	19.0	11.2	4.9	Ekos	4,159	± 1.4	PDF
June 23, 2004	32	31	17	12	6	Ipsos	2,000	± 2.2	HTML
June 23, 2004	34	33	15	13	5	Compass	800	—N/a	PDF
June 23, 2004	34	30	21	12	3	SES	600	± 4.1	PDF
June 22, 2004	34	31	21	12	3	SES	600	± 4.1	PDF
June 22, 2004	33	33	18	11	5	Environics	1,444	± 2.5	PDF
June 21, 2004	34	31	21	10	4	SES	600	± 4.1	PDF
June 20, 2004	34	28	16	13	6	Ipsos	1,000	± 3.1	HTML
June 20, 2004	33	33	18	12	5	SES	600	± 4.1	PDF
June 18, 2004	34	29	22	10	5	Nanos	—N/a	—N/a	—N/a
June 17, 2004	29	32	16	12	7	Ipsos	1,000	± 3.1	HTML
June 16, 2004	32	32	21	12	4	SES	600	± 4.1	PDF
June 16, 2004	32	34	19	12	3	Nanos	—N/a	—N/a	—N/a
June 16, 2004	34	35	16	12	4	Léger	612	± 3.3	PDF
June 16, 2004	35	34	17	11	3	Compas	600	± 4.0	PDF
Leaders Debate in English (June 15, 2004)
Leaders Debate in French (June 14, 2004)
June 13, 2004	31	32	17	12	6	Ipsos	1,000	± 3.1	HTML
June 13, 2004	33	34	18	11	5	SES	600	± 4.1	PDF
June 10, 2004	33	34	18	11	5	SES	600	± 4.1	PDF
June 9, 2004	32	37	17	10	5	SES	600	± 4.1	PDF
June 9, 2004	30	34	19	12	—N/a	Ekos	2,117	± 2.1	PDF
June 8, 2004	33	37	15	10	5	SES	600	± 4.1	PDF
June 8, 2004	32	31	16	11	7	Ipsos	2,003	± 2.2	HTML
June 7, 2004	31	35	16	11	6	SES	600	± 4.1	PDF
June 7, 2004	33	30	19	12	5	Léger	1,500	± 2.5	PDF
June 7, 2004	32	34	20	11	4	Nanos	—N/a	—N/a	—N/a
June 3, 2004	32	31	17	11	6	Ipsos	1,000	± 3.1	HTML
June 3, 2004	37	34	17	9	3	SES	600	± 4.1	PDF
June 2, 2004	35	32	19	9	4	SES	600	± 4.1	PDF
June 1, 2004	37	29	19	11	5	SES	600	± 4.1	PDF
May 31, 2004	35	30	17	12	5	Léger	2,411	± 1.8	PDF
May 31, 2004	36	25	22	13	5	SES	600	± 4.1	PDF
May 30, 2004	36	26	20	13	5	SES	600	± 4.1	PDF
May 30, 2004	34	30	16	11	6	Ipsos	1,000	± 3.1	HTML
May 29, 2004	34	31	19	12	3	SES	600	± 4.1	PDF
May 27, 2004	38	30	18	11	—N/a	Ekos	1,306	± 2.7	PDF
May 27, 2004	40	31	16	10	3	SES	600	± 4.1	PDF
May 26, 2004	42	29	17	10	2	SES	600	± 4.1	PDF
May 25, 2004	41	28	18	11	3	SES	600	± 4.1	PDF
Official call of federal elections (May 23, 2004)

=== During the 37th Parliament of Canada ===
==== After the creation of the Conservative Party ====
Last day of survey	LPC	CPC	NDP	BQ	GPC	Other	Polling firm	Sample	ME	Source
Dissolution of the 37th Parliament of Canada (May 23, 2004)
May 13, 2004	40	25	15	—N/a	—N/a	—N/a	Ipsos	2,000	± 2.2	
May 6, 2004	38	26	16	—N/a	5	—N/a	Ipsos	1,000	± 3.1	HTML
April 28, 2004	40	23	18	11	5	—N/a	Ipsos	946	± 3.2	HTML
April 24, 2004	38	26	17	12	5	—N/a	Leger	1,136	± 2.5	PDF
April 18, 2004	39	29	19	11	—N/a	2	Environics	1,940	± 2.2	HTML
April 8, 2004	35	28	18	10	5	—N/a	Ipsos	1,000	± 3.1	HTML
March 25, 2004	38	27	15	10	5	—N/a	Ipsos	1,000	± 3.1	HTML
March 22, 2004	38	26	16	13	—N/a	—N/a	Leger	1,500	± 2.5	PDF
Stephen Harper becomes leader of the Conservative Party of Canada (March 20, 2004)
March 7, 2004	38	26	17	12	4	2	Ipsos	2,111	—N/a	PDF
February 25, 2004	42	32	15	9	—N/a	2	Ekos	1,200	± 3.1	HTML
February 12, 2004	39	24	18	10	5	3	Ipsos	944	± 3.1	PDF
January 29, 2004	48	23	15	11	3	0	SES	1,000	± 3.1	PDF
January 27, 2004	49	21	15	11	—N/a	—N/a	Leger	1,115	± 2.5	PDF
January 15, 2004	48	19	16	10	4	4	Ipsos	1,055	± 3.1	PDF
December 29, 2003	51	24	15	8	—N/a	2	Environics	1,936	± 2.2	1 2
Paul Martin becomes Prime Minister of Canada (December 12, 2003)
Creation of the Conservative Party of Canada (7/12/2003)

==== Before the creation of the Conservative Party ====
Last day of survey	LPC	NDP	BQ	GPC	CA	PC	Other	Polling firm	Sample	ME	Source
November 27, 2003	43	15	9	5	10	14	4	Ipsos	1,057	± 3.1	PDF
November 9, 2003	49	12	10	—N/a	12	16	1	SES	1,000	± 3.1	PDF
October 23, 2003	46	11	8	4	11	15	4	Ipsos	—N/a	—N/a	PDF
September 2, 2003	46	15	8	—N/a	13	19	0	SES	1,000	± 3.1	PDF
June 9, 2003	54	10	5	—N/a	11	17	—N/a	Ekos	1,501	± 2.5	PDF
June 6, 2003	44	14	8	—N/a	16	16	—N/a	Environics	1,926	± 2.2	HTML
June 5, 2003	45	11	9	5	14	15	—N/a	Ipsos	1,006	± 3.1	HTML
Peter MacKay becomes leader of the Progressive Conservative Party (May 31, 2003)
May 25, 2003	55	10	8	—N/a	12	14	—N/a	Leger	1,181	± 2.5	PDF
May 23, 2003	52	10	7	—N/a	12	18	—N/a	SES	1,000	± 3.1	PDF
April 17, 2003	50	10	9	4	14	13	—N/a	Ipsos	1,009	—N/a	PDF
March 27, 2003	44	14	9	—N/a	16	15	2	Environics	1,943	± 2.3	HTML
February 20, 2003	47.3	17.2	7.6	—N/a	10.7	14.1	—N/a	Ekos	1,006	± 3.1	PDF
February 11, 2003	48	14	7	—N/a	13	16	—N/a	SES	1,000	± 3.1	PDF
Jack Layton becomes leader of the NDP (January 25, 2003)
January 16, 2003	52	14	7	—N/a	11	14	—N/a	Ekos	1,001	± 3.1	PDF
January 14, 2003	43	15	9	—N/a	17	15	1	Environics	3,879	± 1.6	HTML
December 12, 2002	41	12	8	6	16	17	0	Ipsos	1,000	± 3.1	PDF
December 4, 2002	47	11	8	—N/a	16	14	—N/a	Ekos	1,205	± 2.8	PDF
November 3, 2002	49	13	7	—N/a	12	16	—N/a	SES	1,000	± 3.1	PDF
September 30, 2002	44	13	9	4	15	15	1	Ipsos	1,000	± 3.1	PDF
July 14, 2002	41	13	8	—N/a	16	18	4	Ipsos	971	± 3.2	PDF
July 2, 2002	46	12	8	—N/a	18	12	—N/a	SES	1,000	± 3.1	PDF
June 18, 2002	46	14	7	—N/a	17	14	—N/a	Ipsos	1,000	± 3.1	PDF
June 20, 2002	43	14	10	—N/a	17	10	—N/a	Ipsos	2,000	± 2.2	PDF
June 9, 2002	41	9	10	—N/a	18	15	—N/a	Leger	1,500	± 2.5	PDF
June 6, 2002	50	11	8	—N/a	17	13	—N/a	Ekos	1,225	± 2.8	HTML
May 30, 2002	43	13	10	—N/a	18	15	—N/a	Ipsos	2,000	± 2.2	HTML
May 29, 2002	46	13	8	—N/a	17	13	—N/a	Ekos	1,217	± 2.8	PDF
April 24, 2002	49	10	6	—N/a	19	16	—N/a	SES	1,000	± 3.1	PDF
March 28, 2002	45	10	10	—N/a	15	15	—N/a	Ipsos	1,000	± 3.1	HTML
March 24, 2002	44	10	9	—N/a	13	16	8	Leger	1,503	± 2.6	PDF
February 21, 2002	47	10	10	—N/a	12	16	5	Ipsos	1,000	± 3.1	PDF
December 12, 2001	54	10	7	—N/a	11	16	—N/a	Ekos	1,200	± 2.8	
July 29, 2001	52	9	8	—N/a	10	18	—N/a	Ekos	3,004	± 1.8	PDF
July 23, 2001	49	9	9	—N/a	11	20	3	Ipsos	1,000	± 3.2	PDF
July 13, 2001	48	9	9	—N/a	10	16	—N/a	Leger	1,508	± 2.6	PDF
June 10, 2001	46	11	8	—N/a	13	20	2	Environics	1,970	± 2.3	HTML
June 8, 2001	48	9	10	—N/a	10	21	2	Ipsos	1,000	± 3.1	PDF
May 31, 2001	50	9	10	—N/a	11	16	—N/a	Leger	1,504	± 2.6	
May 30, 2001	55	7	5	—N/a	9	19	5	Gallup	1,017	± 3.1	
May 27, 2001	50	10	10	—N/a	11	17	3	Ipsos	1,000	± 3.1	PDF
April 26, 2001	49	11	9	—N/a	13	15	3	Ipsos	1,000	± 3.1	PDF
April 24, 2001	43	10	9	—N/a	19	15	2	Environics	1,966	± 2.2	HTML
March 29, 2001	48	7	9	—N/a	19	15	2	Ipsos	1,003	± 3.1	PDF
March 10, 2001	44	11	—N/a	—N/a	19	14	5	Ipsos	803	± 3.5	HTML
January 31, 2001	49	8	7	—N/a	21	13	—N/a	Ekos	1,491	—N/a	HTML
January 15, 2001	45	10	8	—N/a	23	11	3	Environics	2,114	± 2.2	HTML
November 27, 2000	40.85	8.51	10.72	0.81	25.49	12.19	1.43				

== Regional polls ==
=== Atlantic Canada ===
Evolution of voting intentions in the provinces of Atlantic
Last day of survey	LPC	CPC	NDP	GPC	CA	PC	Other	Polling firm	Sample	ME	Source
Voting result	43.8	30.0	22.6	3.0	—	—	0.5				
June 24, 2004	45	24	25	4	—N/a	—	—	Nanos	—N/a	—N/a	
June 24, 2004	39	33	28	0	—	—	0	Ekos	—N/a	—N/a	PDF
June 23, 2004	44	23	26	7	—	—	0	Ipsos	154	—N/a	PDF
June 20, 2004	37	41	15	2	—	—	5	Ipsos	77	—N/a	PDF
June 9, 2004	43	28	25	4	—	—	0	Ekos	—N/a	—N/a	PDF
June 7, 2004	42	29	22	—N/a	—	—	6	Léger	—N/a	—N/a	PDF
May 31, 2004	41	30	21	6	—	—	2	Léger	—N/a	—N/a	PDF
May 30, 2004	41	30	26	2	—	—	—N/a	SES	87	± 11.0	PDF
Official call of federal elections (May 23, 2004)
May 20, 2004	50	21	24	1	—	—	3	Ipsos	60	—N/a	PDF
April 25, 2004	46	34	19	1	—	—	—N/a	SES	100	± 10.0	PDF
March 22, 2004	36	39	18	—N/a	—	—	6	Léger	—N/a	—N/a	PDF
April 17, 2003	53	—	21	0	5	22	0	Ipsos	100	—N/a	PDF
February 20, 2003	55	—	15	—N/a	5	23	2	Ekos	—N/a	—N/a	PDF
January 16, 2003	59	—	11	—N/a	3	26	2	Ekos	—N/a	—N/a	PDF
January 14, 2003	49	—	14	—N/a	7	28	1	Environics	467	± 4.6	HTML
December 12, 2002	46	—	14	0	5	34	0	Ipsos	79	—N/a	PDF
July 18, 2002	53	—	12	—N/a	6	27	2	Ipsos	90	—N/a	PDF
June 20, 2002	50	—	15	—N/a	9	25	1	Ipsos	182	—N/a	PDF
June 9, 2002	55	—	11	—N/a	5	22	7	Léger	100	—N/a	PDF
May 30, 2002	53	—	13	—N/a	9	25	0	Ipsos	167	—N/a	PDF
April 2002	37	—	22	—N/a	12	23	5	Léger	100	—N/a	PDF
March 28, 2002	49	—	15	—N/a	4	31	1	Ipsos	90	—N/a	PDF
February 21, 2002	57	—	7	—N/a	2	28	6	Ipsos	92	—N/a	PDF
August 29, 2001	54	—	12	—N/a	2	31	1	Ekos	—N/a	—N/a	PDF
August 13, 2001	50	—	19	—N/a	5	23	4	Léger	—N/a	—N/a	PDF
July 10, 2001	51	—	12	—N/a	9	27	1	Environics	236	± 6.5	HTML
May 27, 2001	61	—	11	—N/a	5	23	0	Ipsos	93	—N/a	PDF
April 24, 2001	46	—	12	—N/a	11	29	1	Environics	234	± 6.5	HTML
April 2001	51	—	13	—N/a	6	26	3	Léger	119	—N/a	PDF
March 29, 2001	59	—	6	—N/a	11	24	0	Ipsos	89	—N/a	PDF

=== Central Canada ===
==== Quebec ====
===== During the election campaign =====
Last day of survey	LPC	CPC	NDP	BQ	GPC	Other	Polling firm	Sample	ME	Source
Election	33.9	8.8	4.6	48.9	3.2	3.8				
June 24, 2004	28	11	7	51	3	—N/a	SES	286	± 5.9	PDF
June 24, 2004	32	11	5	48	—N/a	4 (Note: Including the Green Party of Canada.)	Leger	1,101	± 3.2	PDF
June 24, 2004	28	11	7	51	3	—N/a	Ekos	—N/a	—N/a	PDF
June 23, 2004	29	9	5	48	5	3	Ipsos	460	—N/a	PDF
June 22, 2004	25	10	10	50	—N/a	4	Environics	—N/a	—N/a	HTML
June 21, 2004	26	13	6	50	—N/a	—N/a	CROP	606	± 4.0	PDF
June 20, 2004	23	8	9	53	3	3	Ipsos	247	—N/a	HTML
June 17, 2004	22	13	9	48	7	2	Ipsos	247	—N/a	PDF
June 16, 2004	36	9	7	46	—N/a	2	Compas	—N/a	—N/a	PDF
June 16, 2004	30	13	6	48	—N/a	3	Leger	874	± 3.1	PDF
June 16, 2004	30	9	5	52	5	—N/a	SES	173	± 7.6	PDF
June 15, 2004	31	15	7	46	—N/a	1	Leger	426	± 4.4	PDF
June 13, 2004	28	11	7	48	5	1	Ipsos	222	—N/a	PDF
June 9, 2004	22	13	8	54	3	—N/a	Ekos	—N/a	—N/a	PDF
June 9, 2004	32	14	8	44	—N/a	—N/a	CROP	600	± 4.0	PDF
June 8, 2004	24	9	8	50	5	—N/a	Ipsos	—N/a	—N/a	HTML
June 7, 2004	31	13	8	46	—N/a	2	Leger	—N/a	—N/a	PDF
June 6, 2004	30	15	10	43	3	—N/a	SES	178	± 7.5	PDF
June 3, 2004	28	13	6	45	4	—N/a	Ipsos	—N/a	—N/a	HTML
May 31, 2004	33	8	9	46	2	—N/a	Leger	1,100	± 1.8	PDF
May 30, 2004	29	—N/a	—N/a	44	—N/a	—N/a	Ipsos	—N/a	—N/a	HTML
May 30, 2004	30	13	5	49	3	—N/a	SES	196	± 7.1	PDF
May 27, 2004	36	11	6	45	—N/a	—N/a	Ekos	—N/a	—N/a	PDF
Official call of federal elections (May 23, 2004)

===== In 2004 (before the election campaign) =====
Last day of survey	LPC	CPC	NDP	BQ	GPC	Other	Polling firm	Sample	ME	Source
May 20, 2004	28	7	8	50	4	—N/a	Ipsos	215	—N/a	PDF
May 20, 2004	34	10	15	42	—N/a	—N/a	CROP	854	± 3.4	PDF
May 19, 2004	40	—N/a	—N/a	43	—N/a	—N/a	Compass	—N/a	—N/a	
May 16, 2004	35	10	7	44	—N/a	4	Leger	1,005	± 3.0	PDF
May 13, 2004	31	10	10	46	—N/a	—N/a	Ipsos	—N/a	—N/a	PDF
May 6, 2004	36	—N/a	—N/a	41	—N/a	—N/a	Ipsos	—N/a	—N/a	HTML
April 28, 2004	33	8	8	46	5	1	Ipsos	224	—N/a	PDF
April 25, 2004	39	10	10	41	—N/a	—N/a	CROP	1,001	± 3.0	PDF
April 25, 2004	35	9	8	46	2	—N/a	SES	218	± 6.8	PDF
April 24, 2004	34	8	8	46	3	—N/a	Leger	—N/a	—N/a	PDF
April 18, 2004	37	8	8	45	—N/a	2	Environics	—N/a	—N/a	HTML
April 8, 2004	30	11	10	45	2	2	Ipsos	—N/a	—N/a	HTML
March 29, 2004	35	11	9	45	—N/a	—N/a	CROP	1,004	± 3.0	PDF
March 25, 2004	33	8	6	44	7	2	Ipsos	204	—N/a	PDF
March 22, 2004	36	8	8	45	—N/a	3	Leger	—N/a	—N/a	PDF
March 7, 2004	31	6	8	49	4	2	Ipsos	476	—N/a	PDF
February 26, 2004	32	9	10	48	—N/a	1	CROP	607	± 4.0	PDF
February 25, 2004	38	—N/a	—N/a	44	—N/a	—N/a	Ekos	—N/a	—N/a	HTML
February 22, 2004	38	—N/a	—N/a	38	—N/a	—N/a	CROP	—N/a	—N/a	PDF
February 19, 2004	30	10	9	44	3	5	Ipsos	225	—N/a	PDF
February 12, 2004	34	7	11	47	—N/a	1	CROP	—N/a	—N/a	PDF
February 12, 2004	40	5	8	39	5	3	Ipsos	213	—N/a	PDF
January 27, 2004	46	6	7	39	—N/a	—N/a	Leger	—N/a	—N/a	PDF
January 24, 2004	51	5	10	33	—N/a	1	CROP	1,000	± 3.0	PDF
January 18, 2004	47	6	8	36	—N/a	3	Leger	1,000	± 3.4	PDF
January 15, 2004	45	3	6	39	4	3	Ipsos	—N/a	—N/a	PDF

===== In 2003 =====
Last day of survey	LPC	CPC	NDP	BQ	GPC	CA	PC	Other	Polling firm	Sample	ME	Source
December 17, 2003	50	5	9	35	—N/a	—	—	—N/a	CROP	986	± 3.0	PDF
November 27, 2003	40	—	8	38	5	3	4	3	Ipsos	209	—N/a	PDF
November 25, 2003	46	—	10	38	—N/a	2	1	3	Leger	—N/a	—N/a	PDF
November 23, 2003	50	—	—N/a	34	—N/a	—N/a	—N/a	—N/a	CROP	1,003	—N/a	PDF
October 23, 2003	50	—	6	31	4	3	5	2	Ipsos	213	—N/a	PDF
September 29, 2003	50	—	7	35	—N/a	—N/a	5	—N/a	CROP	1,002	—N/a	PDF
July 9, 2003	65	—	—N/a	20	—N/a	—N/a	—N/a	—N/a	Ekos	—N/a	—N/a	PDF
July 6, 2003	49	—	—N/a	35	—N/a	—N/a	6	—N/a	Environics	472	± 4.5	HTML
June 5, 2003	52	—	5	33	4	1	4	—N/a	Ipsos	230	—N/a	PDF
May 25, 2003	62	—	6	28	—N/a	1	3	—N/a	Leger	—N/a	—N/a	PDF
April 17, 2003	50	—	3	36	5	2	4	—N/a	Ipsos	233	—N/a	PDF
March 27, 2003	46	—	8	38	—N/a	3	4	1	Environics	485	± 4.5	HTML
February 20, 2003	49	—	9	35	—N/a	1	3	2	Ekos	—N/a	—N/a	PDF
January 16, 2003	55	—	5	31	—N/a	3	3	4	Ekos	243	± 6.3	1 2
January 14, 2003	41	—	12	38	—N/a	3	4	1	Environics	967	± 3.2	HTML

===== In 2002 =====
Last day of survey	LPC	NDP	BQ	GPC	CA	PC	Other	Polling firm	Sample	ME	Source
December 12, 2002	39	12	34	7	2	5	0	Ipsos	213	—N/a	PDF
November 24, 2002	40	4	40	—N/a	3	8	5	Leger	774	± 3.4	PDF
September 30, 2002	38	11	36	4	1	8	1	Ipsos	250	—N/a	PDF
August 14, 2002	38	15	33	—N/a	7	5	2	Ipsos	199	—N/a	PDF
July 18, 2002	46	12	26	—N/a	5	7	3	Ipsos	222	—N/a	PDF
June 20, 2002	39	12	39	—N/a	3	5	1	Ipsos	—N/a	—N/a	HTML
June 9, 2002	37	6	37	—N/a	2	7	11	Leger	400	± 4.5	PDF
May 30, 2002	38	12	39	—N/a	3	8	—N/a	Ipsos	—N/a	—N/a	HTML
March 28, 2002	47	5	38	—N/a	3	5	—N/a	Ipsos	—N/a	—N/a	HTML
March 24, 2002	46	4	37	—N/a	2	4	7	Leger	—N/a	—N/a	PDF
February 21, 2002	46	6	39	—N/a	1	7	1	Ipsos	215	—N/a	PDF

===== In 2001 =====
Last day of survey	LPC	NDP	BQ	GPC	CA	PC	Other	Polling firm	Sample	ME	Source
December 12, 2001	46	3	37	—N/a	1	7	7	Leger	1,000	± 3.4	1 2
December 12, 2001	58	3	31	—N/a	1	6	1	Ekos	—N/a	—N/a	HTML
August 29, 2001	50	5	33	—N/a	2	9	1	Ekos	—N/a	± 3.7	PDF
August 23, 2001	47	5	37	—N/a	4	7	1	Ipsos	250	—N/a	PDF
August 13, 2001	45	5	37	—N/a	3	7	4	Leger	401	± 5.5	1 2
July 10, 2001	49	4	33	—N/a	4	9	1	Environics	482	± 4.6	HTML
July 8, 2001	43	4	41	—N/a	2	10	0	Ipsos	212	—N/a	PDF
May 27, 2001	44	2	39	—N/a	2	11	2	Ipsos	230	—N/a	PDF
May 21, 2001	45	3	38	—N/a	1	10	3	Leger	998	—N/a	1 2
April 26, 2001	43	7	36	—N/a	4	9	2	Ipsos	253	—N/a	PDF
April 24, 2001	41	6	40	—N/a	5	6	3	Environics	485	± 4.5	HTML
March 29, 2001	45	4	37	—N/a	4	9	2	Ipsos	253	—N/a	PDF
March 10, 2001	46	—N/a	32	—N/a	—N/a	—N/a	—N/a	Ipsos	—N/a	—N/a	HTML
January 31, 2001	52	—N/a	30	—N/a	—N/a	—N/a	—N/a	Ekos	379	± 5.1	HTML
January 15, 2001	42	7	35	—N/a	6	5	4	Environics	504	± 4.5	HTML
2000 Election	44.2	1.8	39.9	0.6	6.7	5.6	1.2				

=== Ontario ===
Evolution of voting intentions in Ontario
Last day of survey	LPC	CPC	NDP	GPC	CA	PC	Other	Polling firm	Sample	ME	Source
Voting result	44.7	31.5	18.1	4.4	—	—	1.3				
June 24, 2004	39	32	25	4	—	—	—N/a	Nanos			
June 24, 2004	39	32	25	4	—	—	—N/a	SES	393	± 5.0	PDF
June 24, 2004	38	35	21	5	—	—	1	Ekos	—N/a	—N/a	PDF
June 23, 2004	38	34	20	6	—	—	2	Ipsos	758	—N/a	PDF
June 22, 2004	40	35	19	—N/a	—	—	5	Environics	—N/a	—N/a	HTML
June 20, 2004	42	30	20	6	—	—	2	Ipsos	379	—N/a	PDF
June 16, 2004	36	40	23	2	—	—	—N/a	SES	259	± 6.2	PDF
June 9, 2004	34	38	21	6	—	—	—N/a	Ekos	—N/a	—N/a	PDF
June 7, 2004	35	36	24	—N/a	—	—	5	Léger	—N/a	—N/a	PDF
June 6, 2004	33	43	22	3	—	—	—N/a	SES	254	± 6.3	PDF
May 31, 2004	39	37	18	5	—	—	1	Léger	—N/a	± 3.5	PDF
May 30, 2004	39	32	25	3	—	—	—N/a	SES	237	± 6.5	PDF
Official call of federal elections (May 23, 2004)
March 22, 2004	47	28	19	—N/a	—	—	6	Léger	—N/a	—N/a	PDF
February 25, 2004	47	36	15	—N/a	—	—	2	Ekos	—N/a	—N/a	HTML
April 17, 2003	58	—	9	3	14	15	1	Ipsos	282	—N/a	PDF
March 27, 2003	50	—	15	—N/a	15	18	2	Environics	544	± 4.3	HTML
February 20, 2003	52	—	20	—N/a	8	19	2	Ekos	—N/a	—N/a	PDF
January 16, 2003	60	—	15	—N/a	8	17	1	Ekos	—N/a	—N/a	PDF
January 14, 2003	53	—	14	—N/a	14	18	1	Environics	—N/a	—N/a	HTML
December 12, 2002	51	—	11	6	11	22	0	Ipsos	255	—N/a	PDF
May 30, 2002	55	—	11	—N/a	15	19	0	Ipsos	542	—N/a	PDF
August 29, 2001	62	—	10	—N/a	8	20	2	Ekos	—N/a	—N/a	PDF
August 23, 2001	53	—	11	—N/a	11	22	2	Ipsos	300	—N/a	PDF
August 13, 2001	58	—	9	—N/a	8	15	11	Léger	—N/a	—N/a	PDF
July 10, 2001	51	—	13	—N/a	11	24	1	Environics	555	± 4.2	HTML
April 24, 2001	54	—	8	—N/a	19	18	2	Environics	545	± 4.3	HTML
March 29, 2001	56	—	8	—N/a	18	16	2	Ipsos	300	—N/a	PDF
Election 2000	51.5	—	8.3	0.9	23.6	14.4	1.3				

=== Prairies ===
Evolution of voting intentions in Prairies (Manitoba and Saskatchewan)
Last day of survey	LPC	CPC	NDP	GPC	CA	PC	Other	Polling firm	Sample	ME	Source
Voting result	30.3	40.4	23.4	2.7	—	—	3.1				
June 24, 2004	39	34	24	2	—	—	—N/a	SES	137	± 8.5	PDF
June 24, 2004	30	40	26	—N/a	—	—	4	Léger	—N/a	—N/a	PDF
June 24, 2004	29	37	30	5	—	—	0	Ekos	—N/a	—N/a	PDF
June 23, 2004	32	36	25	5	—	—	2	Ipsos	136	—N/a	PDF
June 20, 2004	33	37	17	7	—	—	6	Ipsos	68	—N/a	PDF
June 17, 2004	28	36	29	4	—	—	3	Ipsos	68	—N/a	PDF
June 16, 2004	32	32	30	6	—	—	—N/a	SES	89	± 10.6	PDF
June 13, 2004	21	56	16	4	—	—	2	Ipsos	58	—N/a	PDF
June 9, 2004	32	36	28	3	—	—	—N/a	Ekos	—N/a	—N/a	PDF
June 7, 2004	35	38	21	—N/a	—	—	6	Léger	—N/a	—N/a	PDF
June 6, 2004	35	42	20	4	—	—	—N/a	SES	77	± 11.4	PDF
May 31, 2004	35	34	26	4	—	—	2	Léger	—N/a	—N/a	PDF
May 30, 2004	41	35	23	1	—	—	—N/a	SES	79	± 11.0	PDF
Official call of federal elections (May 23, 2004)
May 20, 2004	32	40	24	3	—	—	2	Ipsos	56	—N/a	PDF
April 25, 2004	33	31	33	4	—	—	—N/a	SES	83	± 11.0	PDF
March 22, 2004	25	40	25	—N/a	—	—	9	Léger	—N/a	—N/a	PDF
April 17, 2003	38	—	27	1	19	13	1	Ipsos	100	—N/a	PDF
February 20, 2003	47	—	20	—N/a	22	10	0	Ekos	—N/a	—N/a	PDF
January 16, 2003	27	—	31	—N/a	23	18	2	Ekos	—N/a	—N/a	PDF
December 12, 2002	28	—	22	4	32	14	0	Ipsos	80	—N/a	PDF
July 18, 2002	33	—	17	—N/a	31	16	3	Ipsos	85	—N/a	PDF
June 20, 2002	37	—	17	—N/a	32	14	0	Ipsos	200	—N/a	PDF
June 9, 2002	26	—	13	—N/a	36	18	7	Léger	125	—N/a	PDF
May 30, 2002	27	—	22	—N/a	32	16	3	Ipsos	164	—N/a	PDF
April 2002	30	—	28	—N/a	19	17	6	Léger	125	—N/a	PDF
March 28, 2002	29	—	22	—N/a	29	14	5	Ipsos	92	—N/a	PDF
February 21, 2002	41	—	19	—N/a	18	15	7	Ipsos	83	—N/a	PDF
August 29, 2001	41	—	21	—N/a	18	17	4	Ekos	—N/a	—N/a	PDF
August 13, 2001	41	—	16	—N/a	14	25	4	Léger	108	—N/a	PDF
May 27, 2001	40	—	22	—N/a	24	12	3	Ipsos	83	—N/a	PDF
May 2001	30	—	20	—N/a	19	23	8	Léger	108	—N/a	PDF
March 29, 2001	38	—	18	—N/a	30	13	1	Ipsos	100	—N/a	PDF

=== Alberta ===
Evolution of voting intentions in Alberta
Last day of survey	LPC	CPC	NDP	GPC	CA	PC	Other	Polling firm	Sample	ME	Source
Voting result	22.0	61.7	9.5	6.1	—	—	0.7				
June 24, 2004	23	62	13	2	—	—	0	SES	145	± 8.3	PDF
June 24, 2004	23	58	12	7	—	—	0	Ekos	—N/a	—N/a	PDF
June 23, 2004	20	59	11	6	—	—	4	Ipsos	194	—N/a	PDF
June 22, 2004	21	62	13	—N/a	—	—	4	Environics	—N/a	—N/a	HTML
June 20, 2004	25	45	17	11	—	—	1	Ipsos	97	—N/a	PDF
June 17, 2004	17	59	11	7	—	—	5	Ipsos	97	—N/a	PDF
June 16, 2004	32	51	14	5	—	—	0	SES	89	± 10.6	PDF
June 9, 2004	25	57	14	4	—	—	—N/a	Ekos	—N/a	—N/a	PDF
June 7, 2004	30	52	15	—N/a	—	—	3	Léger	—N/a	—N/a	PDF
June 6, 2004	33	51	14	2	—	—	0	SES	88	± 10.7	PDF
May 31, 2004	28	54	12	4	—	—	2	Léger	—N/a	—N/a	PDF
May 30, 2004	31	53	11	5	—	—	0	SES	81	± 11.0	PDF
Official call of federal elections (May 23, 2004)
April 28, 2004	31	46	15	6	—	—	2	Ipsos	91	—N/a	PDF
April 25, 2004	33	57	10	0	—	—	0	SES	77	± 11.0	PDF
April 24, 2004	24	60	14	—N/a	—	—	2	Léger	—N/a	—N/a	PDF
March 22, 2004	27	49	17	—N/a	—	—	7	Léger	—N/a	—N/a	PDF
February 12, 2004	28	50	16	3	—	—	3	Ipsos	92	—N/a	PDF
January 27, 2004	40	53	5	—N/a	—	—	2	Léger	—N/a	—N/a	PDF
January 15, 2004	35	47	13	2	—	—	4	Ipsos	—N/a	—N/a	PDF
November 27, 2003	28	—	8	6	30	24	3	Ipsos	86	—N/a	PDF
October 23, 2003	27	—	8	1	34	23	7	Ipsos	92	—N/a	PDF
July 6, 2003	28	—	6	—N/a	39	26	1	Environics	203	± 6.9	HTML
June 5, 2003	27	—	10	4	34	25	0	Ipsos	119	—N/a	PDF
April 17, 2003	29	—	4	4	39	24	0	Ipsos	104	—N/a	PDF
March 27, 2003	25	—	12	—N/a	40	22	1	Environics	201	± 7.1	HTML
February 20, 2003	32	—	8	—N/a	32	28	3	Ekos	—N/a	—N/a	PDF
January 16, 2003	35	—	7	—N/a	26	27	5	Ekos	—N/a	—N/a	PDF
January 14, 2003	24	—	9	—N/a	45	21	1	Environics	411	± 4.9	HTML
December 12, 2002	24	—	7	2	48	19	1	Ipsos	89	—N/a	PDF
September 30, 2002	23	—	9	3	48	16	0	Ipsos	100	—N/a	PDF
August 14, 2002	19	—	9	—N/a	42	24	6	Ipsos	94	—N/a	PDF
July 18, 2002	19	—	6	—N/a	50	25	1	Ipsos	90	—N/a	PDF
June 9, 2002	19	—	6	—N/a	55	16	5	Léger	125	—N/a	PDF
May 30, 2002	28	—	6	—N/a	49	16	1	Ipsos	177	—N/a	PDF
April 2002	31	—	6	—N/a	34	20	9	Léger	125	—N/a	PDF
March 28, 2002	26	—	9	—N/a	45	14	7	Ipsos	100	—N/a	PDF
February 21, 2002	31	—	4	—N/a	34	27	4	Ipsos	100	—N/a	PDF
August 29, 2001	33	—	7	—N/a	26	30	4	Ekos	—N/a	—N/a	PDF
August 23, 2001	34	—	8	—N/a	28	27	2	Ipsos	100	—N/a	PDF
August 13, 2001	31	—	10	—N/a	20	32	8	Léger	—N/a	—N/a	PDF
July 24, 2001	29	—	7	—N/a	30	32	2	Ipsos	800	± 3.5	PDF
July 10, 2001	25	—	8	—N/a	37	29	2	Environics	217	± 6.8	HTML
May 31, 2001	33	—	7	—N/a	29	25	6	Léger	141	—N/a	PDF
May 27, 2001	28	—	8	—N/a	31	29	3	Ipsos	100	—N/a	PDF
April 26, 2001	26	—	4	—N/a	39	30	1	Ipsos	90	—N/a	PDF
April 24, 2001	24	—	6	—N/a	43	24	1	Environics	212	± 6.9	HTML
April 19, 2001	27	—	7	—N/a	38	24	4	Ipsos	—N/a	—N/a	PDF
March 29, 2001	27	—	3	—N/a	40	27	3	Ipsos	95	—N/a	PDF
January 15, 2001	30	—	6	—N/a	46	14	4	Environics	221	± 2.7	PDF
Election 2000	20.9	—	5.4	0.5	58.9	13.5	0.8				

=== British Columbia ===
Evolution of voting intentions in British Columbia
Last day of survey	LPC	CPC	NDP	GPC	CA	PC	Other	Polling firm	Sample	ME	Source
Voting result	28.6	36.3	26.6	6.3	—	—	2.2				
June 24, 2004	30	34	27	7	—	—	2	Ekos	—N/a	—N/a	PDF
June 24, 2004	28	38	28	6	—	—	—N/a	SES	192	± 7.2	PDF
June 23, 2004	25	38	26	8	—	—	2	Ipsos	800	± 3.5	PDF
June 23, 2004	24	44	22	8	—	—	2	Ipsos	264	—N/a	PDF
June 22, 2004	31	34	31	—N/a	—	—	4	Environics	—N/a	—N/a	HTML
June 20, 2004	32	36	18	8	—	—	6	Ipsos	132	—N/a	PDF
June 17, 2004	32	34	12	7	—	—	6	Ipsos	120	—N/a	PDF
June 16, 2004	27	35	25	10	—	—	3 (Note: Of which 3% for the Bloc Québécois which only presents candidates Québec.)	SES	135	± 8.7	PDF
June 9, 2004	29	41	26	5	—	—	—N/a	Ekos	—N/a	—N/a	PDF
June 7, 2004	31	31	26	—N/a	—	—	12	Léger	—N/a	—N/a	PDF
June 6, 2004	31	37	26	5	—	—	—N/a	SES	118	± 9.2	PDF
May 31, 2004	29	32	28	9	—	—	1	Léger	—N/a	—N/a	PDF
May 30, 2004	34	29	29	8	—	—	0	SES	121	± 9.1	PDF
Official call of federal elections (May 23, 2004)
April 28, 2004	30	25	26	9	—	—	10	Ipsos	109	—N/a	PDF
April 25, 2004	31	30	32	8	—	—	0	SES	117	± 9.2	PDF
April 24, 2004	31	23	29	13	—	—	3	Léger	—N/a	—N/a	PDF
March 22, 2004	31	37	22	—N/a	—	—	10	Léger	—N/a	—N/a	PDF
January 27, 2004	31	37	22	—N/a	—	—	10	Léger	—N/a	—N/a	PDF
January 15, 2004	39	26	26	—N/a	—	—	10	Ipsos	—N/a	—N/a	PDF
November 27, 2003	32	—	19	13	20	11	5	Ipsos	121	—N/a	PDF
October 23, 2003	40	—	14	8	23	9	6	Ipsos	116	—N/a	PDF
April 17, 2003	45	—	18	10	18	8	0	Ipsos	115	—N/a	PDF
March 27, 2003	44	—	20	—N/a	22	12	3	Environics	225	± 6.7	HTML
February 20, 2003	39	—	28	—N/a	19	6	9	Ekos	—N/a	—N/a	PDF
January 16, 2003	46	—	23	—N/a	18	6	8	Ekos	—N/a	—N/a	PDF
January 14, 2003	32	—	22	—N/a	32	12	2	Environics	445	± 4.7	HTML
December 12, 2002	31	—	11	13	31	13	1	Ipsos	125	—N/a	PDF
July 18, 2002	34	—	27	—N/a	25	8	6	Ipsos	129	—N/a	PDF
June 20, 2002	28	—	21	—N/a	31	14	6	Ipsos	267	—N/a	PDF
June 9, 2002	30	—	11	—N/a	31	17	11	Léger	—N/a	—N/a	PDF
May 30, 2002	33	—	18	—N/a	33	14	2	Ipsos	263	—N/a	PDF
April 2002	32	—	13	—N/a	20	20	14	Léger	—N/a	—N/a	PDF
August 29, 2001	52	—	11	—N/a	19	14	5	Ekos	—N/a	—N/a	PDF
August 13, 2001	43	—	7	—N/a	22	13	15	Léger	—N/a	—N/a	PDF
July 10, 2001	42	—	15	—N/a	22	18	3	Environics	231	± 6.6	HTML
May 31, 2001	49	—	8	—N/a	21	10	12	Léger	—N/a	—N/a	PDF
April 24, 2001	34	—	16	—N/a	32	12	4	Environics	239	± 6.5	HTML
Election 2000	27.7	—	11.3	2.1	49.4	7.3	2.2				
