= Communist Party of Canada candidates in the 2004 Canadian federal election =

The Communist Party of Canada ran a number of candidates in the 2004 federal election, none of whom were elected. Information about these candidates may be found here.

== Manitoba ==
=== Beatriz Alas (Charleswood—St. James) ===
Alas was a 23-year-old sociology and psychology student at the University of Manitoba. She joined the Communist Party shortly before the election, and focused her campaign on improved programs for recent Canadian immigrants. She received 49 votes (0.12%), finishing sixth against Conservative candidate Steven Fletcher.

=== Paul Sidon (Elmwood—Transcona) ===
Sidon was an overhead door mechanic in the Transcona region of Winnipeg at the time of the election. He became politically active in 1996, working within the progressive Ukrainian-Canadian community and with Manitoba's Cuba Solidarity Committee.

Sidon ran for the Communist Party of Canada on two occasions, and was also candidate of the provincial Communist Party of Canada - Manitoba in 1999. He challenged Darrell Rankin for the provincial party's leadership in January 2004, and received 21% delegate support. He reportedly left the Communist Party shortly after the 2004 election.

Electoral record
Election	Division	Party	Votes	%	Place	Winner
1999 provincial	Transcona	Communist	56	0.64	4/4	Daryl Reid, New Democratic Party
2000 federal	Winnipeg North—St. Paul	Communist	110		8/8	Rey Pagtakhan, Liberal
2004 federal	Elmwood—Transcona	Communist	74	0.25	7/7	Bill Blaikie, New Democratic Party

=== Allister Cucksey (Portage—Lisgar) ===
Cucksey was a 23-year-old university student living in Brandon at the time of the election. He has served as secretary of the Brandon and Area Environmental Council. He has also been a member a Young Communist League, and has worked on matters relating to the environment, sustainable agriculture, medicare and similar issues. In 2003, he took part in protests against the invasion of Iraq (Guelph Mercury, 4 January 2003).

Cucksey was the first Communist candidate to run in Portage—Lisgar since the 1945 election. He received 117 votes (0.34%), finishing sixth against Conservative candidate Brian Pallister.

=== Anna-Celestrya Carr (Winnipeg Centre) ===
Carr was eighteen years old at the time of the election, and may have been the youngest candidate anywhere in the country. She has been an active participant in Winnipeg's peace movement, and has been involved in issues concerning refugees, the women's movement, and Manitoba's Aboriginal community. She received 114 votes in the 2004 election, or about 0.5% of the total cast in the riding. Carr also ran in the 2006 election. In 2004, Carr became the youngest Aboriginal women to ever run in an election in Canadian history.

Carr is the daughter of Cheryl-Anne Carr, who has campaigned as a candidate of the Communist Party of Canada - Manitoba on three occasions.

== Ontario ==
=== Gurdev Singh Mattu (Brampton—Springdale) ===
Mattu was born in Jalandhar, Punjab, India, and for many years served as the vice-president of the Centre of Indian Trade Unions in Punjab. He moved to Brampton in 1997, and became an active figure in the Indo-Canadian community. He received 86 votes (0.21%), finishing fifth against Liberal candidate Ruby Dhalla.
