= 2009 Duhamel municipal election =

Canadian municipal election

The 2009 Duhamel municipal election took place on November 1, 2009, to elect a mayor and councillors in Duhamel, Quebec. David Pharand was elected as the community's new mayor.

== Results ==
2009 Duhamel election, Mayor of Duhamel
Candidate	Total votes	% of total votes
David Pharand	312	55.71
Hélène Côté Lamarche	194	34.64
Yvon Charlesbois	54	9.64
Total valid votes	560	100.00

2009 Duhamel election, Councillor, District One
Candidate	Total votes	% of total votes
Patrick Douglas	215	40.11
(incumbent)Léonce Lessard	196	36.57
Laurent Filion	125	23.32
Total valid votes	536	100.00

- Patrick Douglas was appointed to chair Duhamel's environmental health committee after the election.

2009 Duhamel election, Councillor, District Two
Candidate	Total votes	% of total votes
(incumbent)Gilles Payer	accl.	.

2009 Duhamel election, Councillor, District Three
Candidate	Total votes	% of total votes
Robert Bélanger	305	58.77
Claude Tétrault	214	41.23
Total valid votes	519	100.00

2009 Duhamel election, Councillor, District Four
Candidate	Total votes	% of total votes
Gaétan Lalonde	382	71.54
(incumbent)Guy Lalonde	152	28.46
Total valid votes	534	100.00

2009 Duhamel election, Councillor, District Five
Candidate	Total votes	% of total votes
(incumbent)Daniel Berthiaume	accl.	.

2009 Duhamel election, Councillor, District Six
Candidate	Total votes	% of total votes
Nicole Tousignant	accl.	.

Source: Résultants 2009; Affaires municipales, Régions et Occupation du Territoire, Government of Quebec.
