= 2008 Canadian federal election =

- October 14, 2008

308 seats in the House of Commons 155 seats needed for a majority
- Opinion polls
- Registered: 23,677,639
- Turnout: 58.8% (▼5.9 pp)

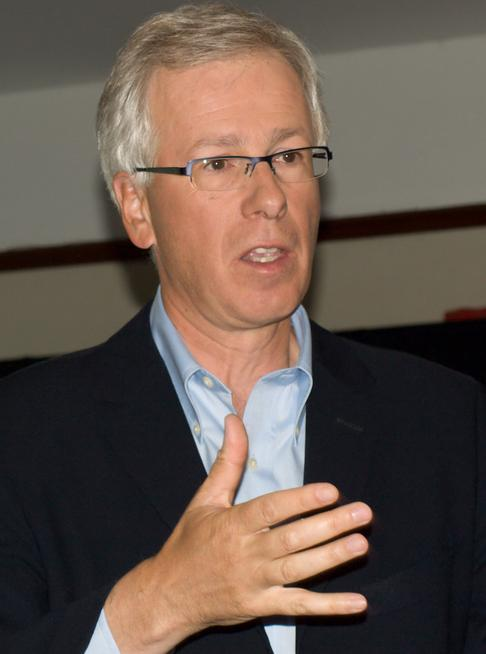

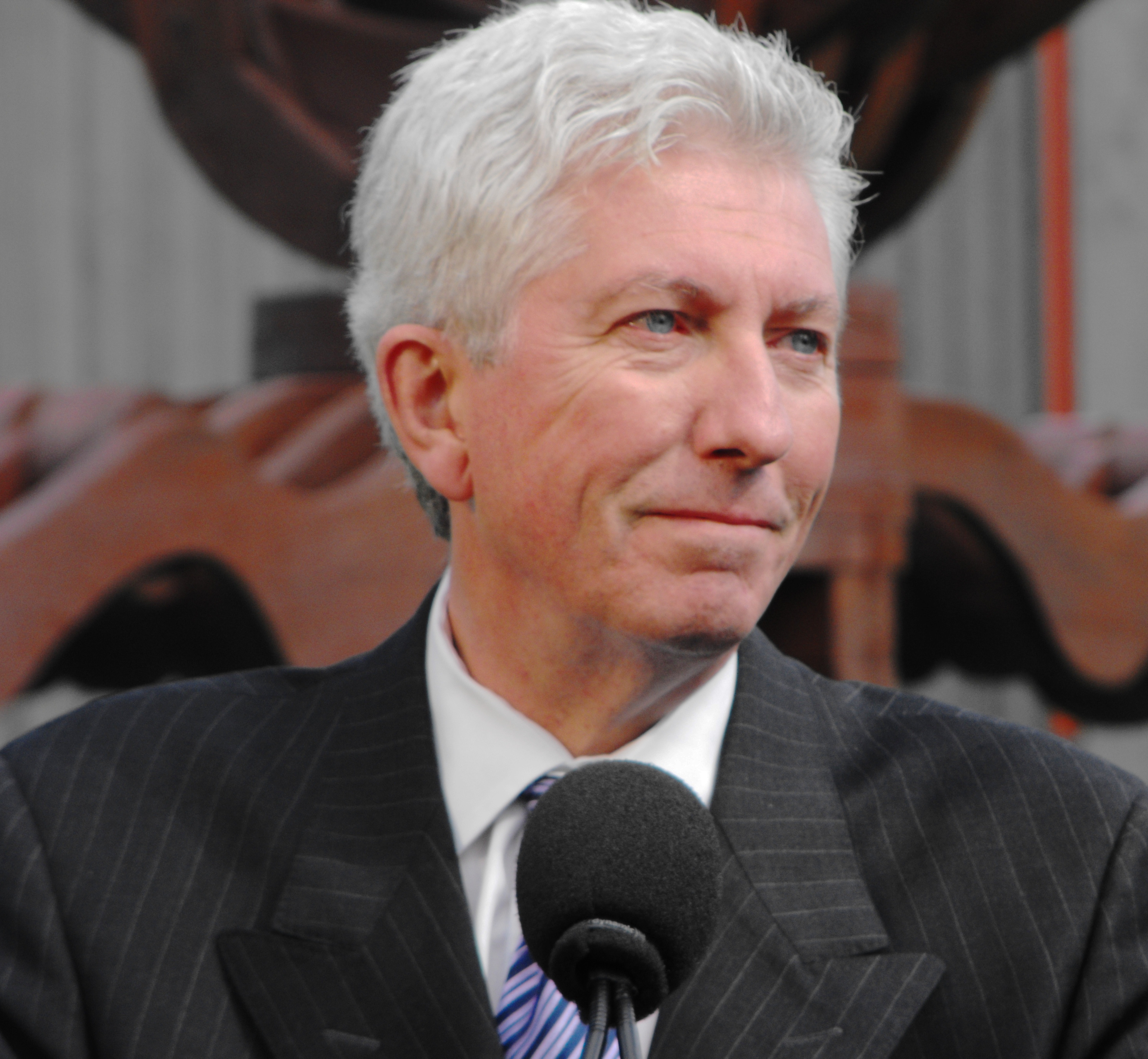

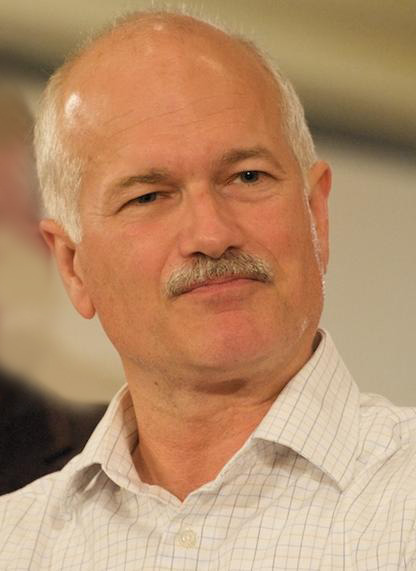

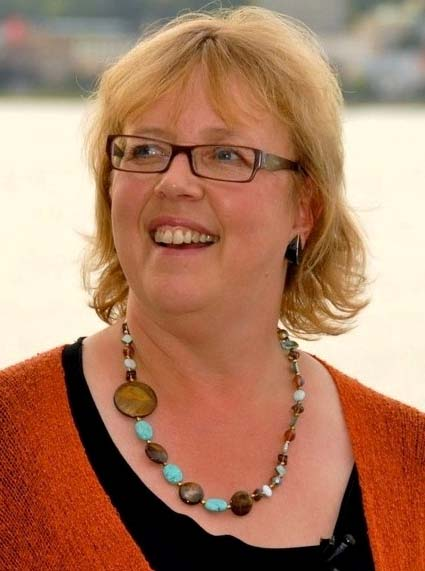
	First party	Second party	Third party
Leader	Stephen Harper	Stéphane Dion	Gilles Duceppe
Party	Conservative	Liberal	Bloc Québécois
Leader since	March 20, 2004	December 2, 2006	March 15, 1997
Leader's seat	Calgary Southwest	Saint-Laurent—Cartierville	Laurier—Sainte-Marie
Last election	124 seats, 36.27%	103 seats, 30.23%	51 seats, 10.48%
Seats before	127	95	48
Seats won	143	77	49
Seat change	▲16	▼18	▲1
Popular vote	5,209,069	3,633,185	1,379,991
Percentage	37.65%	26.26%	9.98% (Note: Only contested seats in Quebec.)
Swing	▲1.38 pp	▼3.97 pp	▼0.50 pp
	Fourth party	Fifth party
Leader	Jack Layton	Elizabeth May
Party	New Democratic	Green
Leader since	January 24, 2003	August 27, 2006
Leader's seat	Toronto—Danforth	Ran in Central Nova (lost)
Last election	29 seats, 17.48%	0 seats, 4.48%
Seats before	30	1
Seats won	37	0
Seat change	▲7	▼1
Popular vote	2,515,288	937,613
Percentage	18.18%	6.78%
Swing	▲0.70 pp	▲2.30 pp
Prime Minister before election
Stephen Harper
Conservative
Prime Minister after election
Stephen Harper
Conservative

The 2008 Canadian federal election was held on October 14, 2008, to elect members to the House of Commons of Canada of the 40th Canadian Parliament after the previous parliament had been dissolved by Governor General Michaëlle Jean on September 7, 2008.

Conservative Prime Minister Stephen Harper called the election due to his belief that there was a lack of cooperation between the minority government Conservatives and the opposition parties, which the former had to rely on to pass legislation; hence Harper argued that Parliament had reached the end of its productiveness.

The election resulted in a second but stronger minority government for Harper's Conservatives. While they were a dozen seats away from a majority government, the Liberal Party led by Stéphane Dion lost 18 seats as the New Democratic Party and the Bloc Québécois made slight gains. The Green Party failed to win any seats and lost its only Member of Parliament. Following the election, the Liberals and New Democrats attempted to form a coalition government and topple the Conservatives from power, but were unsuccessful in doing so.

With a turnout of 58.8% of eligible voters, this election had the lowest in Canadian federal election history, and to date is the only time it has ever dipped below the 60% threshold. This was the first election since 1988 in which a centre-right party won the most seats in Ontario.

== Background ==
In 2007, Parliament passed a law fixing federal election dates every four years and scheduling the next election date as October 19, 2009, but the law did not limit the powers of the Governor General to dissolve Parliament at any time, such as when opposition parties bring down the government on a vote of confidence. In this election there was no loss of a non-confidence vote, but the Prime Minister asked the Governor General to call an election. The Governor General granted the Prime Minister's request.

=== 2006 election ===
64.7% of eligible voters cast ballots in the 2006 federal election. The Conservative Party received the most votes of any single party, with 36% of the vote, and won 124 seats (127 at dissolution). The Liberal Party won fewer seats than in 2004 – 103 seats (96 at dissolution), and 30% of the vote. The Bloc Québécois lost three seats, lowering its total to 51 seats (48 at dissolution), with 10.5% of the vote. The NDP retained its seats held at the dissolution of Parliament, and won 11 more, making its total 29 seats (30 at dissolution), with 17.5% of the vote. The Green Party received 4.5% of the vote, a minimal increase from the previous election, but did not win any seats (1 at dissolution). Independents and other parties constituted 1% of the total vote with one independent winning a seat.

=== Events since the 2006 election ===
Conservatives (143)
Liberals (77)
Bloc Québécois (49)
New Democrats (37)
Independent (2)

Since the 2006 election, seven Members of Parliament (MPs) had changed party: David Emerson, Wajid Khan, and Joe Comuzzi from Liberal to Conservative; Garth Turner from Conservative to Independent to Liberal; Blair Wilson from Liberal to Independent to Green; Louise Thibault from Bloc Québécois to Independent; and Bill Casey from Conservative to Independent. In by-elections, the NDP gained one seat from the Liberal Party, while the Conservative Party gained two seats, one from the Liberals and one from the Bloc Québécois. Four seats were vacant when the election was called: three previously held by the Liberal Party, one by the Bloc Québécois.

The parliament preceding this election was led by the Conservatives, who governed with the smallest plurality ever in the Canadian House of Commons, just 40.6% of the seats. Although the average length of a minority parliament in Canada is 1 year, 5 months, and 22 days (measured from the return of the writs after an election to the dissolution of that parliament), minorities led by the former Progressive Conservative Party have been much shorter: the longest previous Conservative minority was just 6 months and 19 days. The 39th Parliament became Canada's longest serving Conservative minority on October 24, 2006.

On May 30, 2006, the Conservatives tabled An Act to Amend the Canada Elections Act, which would amend the Canada Elections Act to provide fixed election dates. The bill received royal assent on May 3, 2007. The bill stated that there would be an election in 2009, and it would be the first to have a fixed election date, the third Monday in October (October 19, 2009). Despite the bill, on September 7, 2008, the Prime Minister sought the dissolution of the 39th Parliament, and the Governor General agreed to hold a general election on October 14, 2008.

On February 15, 2007, The Globe and Mail reported that the Conservatives were preparing for an election expected to be called shortly after the 2007 budget, due on March 19, 2007. Part of the reason for the timing of the election was given as strengthening Conservative poll numbers coupled with the desire to take advantage of the perception that Harper has "better leadership qualities than Liberal counterpart Stéphane Dion".

On March 17, 2007, an internal Conservative Party memo was leaked to The Canadian Press, telling members that they "need to be ready to campaign within the next week". The memo asked members to donate $75 to $150 to help to fund the early stages of the election campaign. None of these predictions for a federal election to occur in 2007 proved true, but the majority of pundits still believed a federal election would be triggered before the fixed election date of October 19, 2009, for sometime in 2008.

Stephen Harper hinted at the possibility of dissolving parliament on August 14, 2008. Speaking in Newfoundland and Labrador, he cited Stéphane Dion as the main player in making Parliament become increasingly "dysfunctional". "I'm going to have to make a judgment in the next little while as to whether or not this Parliament can function productively," Harper said. This came after repeated confidence votes that resulted in the NDP and Bloc parties not voting in favour of the government, and the Liberal Party voting in favour or not attending the vote. Rumours of a possible fall election were further fuelled by Harper's announcement of a fourth federal by-election for September 22 in the Toronto riding of Don Valley West.

On August 27, 2008, Harper asked Governor General Michaëlle Jean to cancel her trip to the Paralympic Games in Beijing, adding fuel to speculation that the Prime Minister would seek a dissolution. On September 7, 2008, after much speculation, Harper asked the Governor General to call a federal election on October 14, 2008.

== Timeline ==
- February 6, 2006: Harper Cabinet is sworn in.
- May 3, 2007: Bill C-16 receives Royal Assent. This bill states that the next election must be held on October 19, 2009, unless there is an earlier dissolution.
- August 26, 2008: Harper indicates he may call an election for the fall of 2008; Parliament could be dissolved as early as the week of September 1–6.
- August 29, 2008: Harper meets with Gilles Duceppe, the leader of the Bloc Québécois in an attempt to find common ground between the Bloc and the Conservatives.
- August 30, 2008:
  - Former Liberal MP Blair Wilson joins the Green Party after being an independent for nearly a year in the riding of West Vancouver—Sunshine Coast—Sea to Sky Country in British Columbia. Wilson becomes the first Member of Parliament for the Green Party.
  - Harper meets with Jack Layton, the leader of the New Democrats in an attempt to find common ground between the NDP and the Conservatives.
- September 1, 2008: Harper meets with Stéphane Dion, the leader of the Liberals, in an attempt to find common ground between the Liberals and the Conservatives, and avert the dissolution of Parliament, allowing the fall session to continue as planned. However, after a twenty-minute meeting at 24 Sussex Drive, the PM's official residence, Dion emerges stating there is no common ground between the two parties, and that an election is certain.
- September 5, 2008: The Prime Minister's Office (PMO) announces that Prime Minister Stephen Harper will visit the Governor General at 9:00 am on September 7, 2008, to ask for the dissolution of the 39th Parliament and a general election on October 14, 2008.
- September 7, 2008: Prime Minister Harper asks Governor General Michaëlle Jean to call a general election on October 14, 2008. She accepts the request.
- October 14, 2008: Elections held for members of the House of Commons in the 40th Canadian Parliament.
- November 4, 2008: Writs to be returned to the Chief Election Officer.
- November 18, 2008: 40th Parliament summoned.
- December 1, 2008: The Liberals and NDP sign agreement on proposed coalition government to replace the governing Conservatives under Prime Minister Harper.
- December 1, 2008: The Liberals, NDP, and Bloc Québécois sign "policy accord" whereby the Bloc would support a Liberal/NDP government for at least 18 months.
- December 4, 2008: Parliament prorogued by the Governor General during the parliamentary dispute on advice of the Prime Minister.
- January 26, 2009: Parliament to reconvene for second session.

== Pre-election ==
In August 2008, Prime Minister Stephen Harper said he was considering calling an election because of a lack of cooperation in Parliament, saying "all the signs indicate that this Parliament is at the end of its productiveness," while in Inuvik, Northwest Territories. The Conservative Party of Canada fueled rumours of an oncoming election when it released several campaign advertisements that focused on a range of issues, and attacked the Liberal Party of Canada for their proposed carbon tax. The Prime Minister's Office (PMO) confirmed that Harper would call an election for October 14 after meeting with New Democratic Party leader Jack Layton and Bloc Québécois leader Gilles Duceppe, which gave the Prime Minister little hope that a fall session of Parliament can be productive, PMO officials said. Senior government officials announced on the first of September that Stephen Harper would ask the Governor General, Michaëlle Jean, to dissolve parliament and call an election for October 14, after he met with Liberal leader Stéphane Dion who called the meeting a "charade". Dion said the two were unable to agree on how to make the upcoming session of Parliament, slated to begin September 15, more productive.

Liberal Party members gathered in Winnipeg on September 2, for a three-day caucus which changed from preparing for a new parliamentary session to a strategy session to formulate a plan to attack the Conservatives while healing internal party rifts that have surfaced in recent weeks. Conservatives began spending at least $60 million on pre-election funding projects to a wide variety of institutions and groups. A few announcements have been big, including Industry Minister Jim Prentice's pledge of $25 million for the expansion of the Northlands exhibition facility in Edmonton. But the Tories have also announced a number of smaller projects, including $40,000 for the 2008 55+ Games and $25,000 for the Peace Window of the Holy Trinity Anglican Church in Winnipeg. The announcements have also been spread out across the country. The Atlantic region is to get more than $500,000 for youth jobs and eight cultural organizations. The Association of Book Publishers of British Columbia will receive $81,000. Jack Layton attacked the Conservative Party as bribing the public and doing the same thing they used to complain about the Liberals doing before elections.

A survey conducted by Environics found that 38 per cent of Canadians would vote for the Conservative party if an election were held immediately, 28 per cent would vote for the Liberal party, 19 for the NDP, eight for the Bloc Québécois and seven for the Green party. The poll shows Conservatives taking early leads in Ontario, British Columbia and the Prairies. In Atlantic Canada, Liberals still hold a strong majority, while in Quebec the Bloc Québécois leads while the Conservatives and Liberals are almost tied for second. When asked, most Canadians said the Conservatives would handle the economy better, while most said the Liberals would handle the environment better.

On September 7, Harper officially asked for the dissolution of Parliament, and called for an election on October 14.

== Election campaign ==
The 40th Canadian Federal Election campaign officially began at 8:20 a.m. Eastern Daylight Time when Governor General Michaëlle Jean accepted Stephen Harper's request to dissolve Parliament and call an election for October 14, 2008. The party leaders jumped right into the campaign, with Stéphane Dion attacking the Conservatives' record, presenting the Liberal plan, and rejected the accusation by Harper that the Liberal party is a risky choice. Jack Layton took a more forceful approach than previous elections, in which the New Democratic Party has just tried to maintain a high number of seats in Parliament to influence government. Layton has made it clear he will campaign for the position of prime minister itself this time, but also returned to a longstanding NDP theme: alleged abuses by big business. He promised to stop what he called "ripoffs" by big oil, cellphone and banks, and his attacks are expected to focus on the Conservatives and all but ignore the Liberals. Elizabeth May of the Green Party said Canadians would care enough about the environment to vote for her party, as long as she was able to get into the television debates. Stephen Harper has stated his objection to including the Green Party into television debates because of the similar policies of the Green and Liberal party, and how it would be unfair. Bloc Québécois Leader Gilles Duceppe said the Conservatives must be prevented from winning a majority, and the BQ is the only party that can do that. Duceppe compared Harper to US President George W. Bush, and said the government is incompetent.

=== Leaders' debates ===
The two Leaders' Debates of 2008, one each in French and English, included the leaders of five parties, Stephen Harper of the Conservatives, Stéphane Dion of the Liberals, Jack Layton of the NDP, Gilles Duceppe of the Bloc Québécois and Elizabeth May of the Green Party.

The French-language debate aired on Wednesday, October 1 from 8 to 10 p.m. EDT, moderated by Stéphan Bureau, a journalist and host. The English-language debate aired Thursday, October 2 from 9 to 11 p.m. EDT, with Steve Paikin of TVOntario as moderator.

==== Participation ====
Three parties — the Conservatives, the Bloc Québécois and the NDP — opposed the inclusion of the Green Party, citing statements made by Green Party leader Elizabeth May to the effect that the best outcome of the election would be a Liberal-led government, and a deal struck between the Green Party and Liberals where the Liberals would not run in May's riding, Central Nova, and the Green party in Liberal leader Stéphane Dion's riding, Saint-Laurent—Cartierville, which they say make May a "second Liberal candidate".

Stephen Harper and Jack Layton are reported to have said that if the Green Party were included, they would not participate in the Leaders' Debates. Dion said that while he supports May's inclusion, he would not attend if Harper does not, and the Bloc Québécois has stated it will not boycott the debates if May is included. The media consortium in charge of the debate, made up of the CBC, CTV, Global Television and TVA, had decided that it would prefer to broadcast the debates with the four major party leaders, rather than risk not at all or with minimal participation. The Green Party indicated they had begun procedures to lodge a formal complaint with the Canadian Radio-television and Telecommunications Commission, as they have in past federal elections.

On September 10, Harper and Layton released statements that they would not oppose May's inclusion in the debate, citing public backlash and protests — with neither acknowledging making the threat of boycotting the debate — and that the media consortium would reconvene to discuss the matter. Layton stated that "debating about the debate" had become a "distraction", and that he had only one condition, that Stephen Harper be there. In response, spokespeople for Stephen Harper announced they would not stand alone in opposition to the Green Party's inclusion in the debates and also changed their position on the matter. Later that day the consortium announced that May would be allowed to participate in the debate.

==== Format change ====
On September 30, Harper announced that he would ask for the 12 minutes on the economy scheduled for the Leader's Debate to be extended to an hour, citing that the 2008 financial crisis "has deepened since the debate format was finalized", a change which would require agreement from the other parties in the debate to be approved. The NDP released a statement soon after that they supported the move, while public response has been concerned that other topics such as the environment would not end up with enough time to cover the issue.

On October 1, the day of the first debate, it was announced that both debates would get extended time, from 12 to 30 minutes, for the economy, and leaders would not give opening and closing statements, to allow for longer discussions on the economy without removing time from other topics. It was also revealed that instead of leaders standing at individual podiums for the debate, as had been done in past years, the debate would be done in a round table format.

==== Debates ====
===== French debate =====
Much of the French debate revolved around the economy and the environment, with the two topics repeatedly being brought up in discussions allotted for other topics. Stephen Harper came under criticism from every other leader in nearly every topic, especially the economy and environment, with the other party leaders stating that Harper's politics had led to Canada's current crises in those two areas. Their points included that Harper's environmental plan was considered the worst of all developed countries by organizations around the world, with Elizabeth May labeling it "a type of fraud", and that his attempts to remove regulations in the financial sectors, similar to those done by the Bush administration in the United States, have led Canada to being nearly as affected by the 2008 financial crisis as the United States.

Continuous comparisons of Harper to George W. Bush were made over the course of the debate, with Jack Layton stating at one point that with Bush ending his presidency at the end of the year, Harper would be "the last leader of a developed country to follow the Bush doctrine".

===== English debate =====
Following the same tone as the French debate, much of the discussion revolved around the economy and the environment. The other four leaders keep criticizing Harper, especially for his lack of an economic platform despite asking for the format change to focus more on the economy due to the Great Recession, and instead using the time to criticize the economic platforms of the other leaders. May lashed out at Harper for not understanding that Canadians were worried about their homes, jobs and finances, and comparing the current situation to Dutch disease, Dion stated that the only thing that keeps Canada from being hit as hard by the crisis as the US are laws created by the previous Liberal government that the Conservatives had been attempting to overturn, Duceppe repeatedly criticized Harper for financial practices and attitudes similar to the Bush administration, and Layton at one point stated that Harper's position showed he was either incompetent or uncaring to the situation, and asked which one he was, to which Harper did not respond. Harper also came under criticism for his laissez-faire attitude to the job sector, supporting primarily the oil companies and companies that outsource jobs in the manufacturing sector.

When it turned to the environment, the Carbon Tax proposal came up repeatedly, with both Dion and May supporting it, although May to more ambitious figures than Dion, pointing out it was the most recommended and proven way to deal with carbon emissions by countries and organizations around the world, noting the growth that Sweden and Germany have had with this system. Harper criticized the plan, saying would increase taxpayers' burden and that Dion should be "honest with the people" that some environmental measures will cost the economy and said the plan includes $40 billion in carbon taxes and $26 billion in tax cuts. Dion defended the Liberals' Green Shift, saying that "[Harper's statements are] not true at all", and that "for every dollar that we will raise, you will have a tax cut, and these tax cuts will be on your income". Duceppe commented that he would like targets to be applied to individual provinces, thereby allowing Quebec to financially benefit due to already-implemented greenhouse gas reductions. Layton, who favours a cap-and-trade system, said that it is a "figment of Mr. Harper's imagination" that emissions will fall under his plan. When Harper sought to outline his government's record on other environmental fronts, giving examples of his minority government's support for the preservation of hundreds of thousands of hectares of environmentally sensitive land through the Nature Conservancy of Canada, and that the government declared a protected marine area by Lake Superior and created a whale sanctuary by Baffin Island; May responded by saying "The only word he said that's true is on national parks".

Layton also criticized Dion for his lack of accomplishments as official opposition during the minority government, and his party's previous leader's broken promises in areas such as Child Care and Pharmacare.

Duceppe painted the Conservative government's $45 million in national arts and culture funding cuts as an assault on the province's identity, saying "How can you recognize the Quebec nation and then cut culture [funding], which is the soul of a nation?" followed by citing the economic benefits of culture.

Harper also said he had erred in calling for Canada's participation in the 2003 U.S.-led invasion of Iraq, saying "It was absolutely an error, it's obviously clear", adding that the claim of weapons of mass destruction proved false.

Commenting on the debate, Layton said that he "thoroughly enjoyed" May's contributions to the debate. Reporter Julie Van Dusen said that Harper managed to take the hits calmly, as "someone must have told him ... if you fight back or get too partisan, you're going to alienate voters, especially women". Duceppe said he was happy to have forced Harper to admit his support of joining the Iraq war in 2003 was a mistake, adding he will use the admission in the campaign as "Exhibit A" that the Conservative leader lacks solid judgment skills, and that Harper was weakened when he confirmed he does not support a refundable tax credit for the manufacturing industry to encourage companies to improve productivity.

=== Issues ===
==== Arts ====
Stephen Harper had cut $45 million from arts funding while in office, a move that drew much criticism from the other leaders and Quebec citizens, with most leaders seeking to restore the funding. The Conservatives have stated that the money is being reallocated to other arts and cultural programs, including various official languages projects, the 400th anniversary of Quebec City and projects connected with the 2010 Vancouver-Whistler Winter Olympic Games, although the Conservatives' refusal to have a parliamentary review of their cuts and for a moratorium on the measures until the House of Commons Heritage Committee had a chance to hold hearings on culture and arts funding has most opposition members calling foul.

Both Stéphane Dion and Jack Layton have promised to reverse the cut, with Dion also promising to increase funding to Canada Council for the Arts to $360 million, while Layton also promised to bring income averaging for artists to the national level and providing an annual tax exemption of $20,000 for income earned by copyright and residuals, stating that "one of the key things we must do, before we start giving $50-billion tax giveaways to banks and oil companies, is to protect and promote the arts" and "stable, sure and appropriate funding" for CBC/Radio-Canada while also protecting Telefilm Canada and the Canadian Television Fund.

Harper has said that he believes that the issue is a "niche topic", and that "ordinary Canadians" are not particularly concerned with the issue. A group of Canadian performers, which included Art Hindle, Wendy Crewson and Gordon Pinsent, held a press conference on September 24, saying the cuts would cripple the Canadian arts industry.

On September 29, Harper unveiled a new tax credit plan worth an estimated $150 million a year to encourage parents to enroll their kids in arts programs like music and drama. The credit will apply on up to $500 of eligible fees for children under 16 who participate in eligible arts activities. Harper said that "[the Conservatives] spend a lot more on culture and arts" but "in a way that we ensure is an effective use of taxpayers' money and ultimately, in this case, benefits families and all of society as well". Harper has come under criticism when the week before he expressed his opinion that "ordinary working people were unable to relate to taxpayer-subsidized cultural elites when they see them at a rich gala on television".

==== Alleged Cadman bribe attempt ====
In early 2008 it was alleged that Independent MP Chuck Cadman of Surrey North, who was terminally ill with cancer at the time, had been offered a million dollar life insurance policy in exchange for voting against the proposed Liberal budget in May 2005, which he turned down. Under section 119 of the Criminal Code, it is illegal to bribe an MP. Accordingly, Opposition Liberal party Intergovernmental Affairs critic Dominic LeBlanc asked the Royal Canadian Mounted Police (RCMP) in February 2008 to investigate this allegation. In May 2008, the RCMP announced that there was not enough evidence to support charges. Cadman died in July. The following month, Harper stated in a court deposition that any such million-dollar offer would have to be authorized by him, and that he did not issue any such authorization. There is currently an ongoing legal battle between the Liberals and the Conservatives over the matter.

On September 24, while campaigning in Surrey North, Stephen Harper's campaign team barred reporters from talking with the local Conservative candidate, Dona Cadman, who is Chuck Cadman's widow. The campaign team called in the Royal Canadian Mounted Police (RCMP), and ordered them to "Keep [the reporters] out" while Cadman was taken away by staff. Harper spokesman Kory Teneycke later stated that he had not seen the incident, but the local candidates did not need to be interviewed, that "Local candidates' priority is campaigning in their local ridings, and not talking to the national media", and that it should be enough that they hold daily news conferences with the party's most prominent members.

The incident has reminded people of Conservative tactics during the 2006 election, where attempts by the media to speak with local candidates were stopped by campaign personnel, especially the Harold Albrecht incident, where campaign officials forced Albrecht to stay in a restaurant kitchen when journalists attempted to interview him.

The Conservatives chose former U.S. Federal Bureau of Investigation agent Bruce Koenig to analyze a tape of reporter Tom Zytaruk interviewing Harper on the Cadman bribe attempt. The tape was a key piece of evidence in the ongoing legal battle. On October 10, Koenig announced that the tape had not been altered in any way, contrary to the claims by Stephen Harper that it had been altered.

==== Canadian involvement in Afghanistan ====
The ongoing involvement of the Canadian Forces in Afghanistan may also influence voters. Desmond Morton, a political science professor at McGill University suggested that the Conservatives could be blamed for the war because they have extended the mission twice, despite the fact that it was then Liberal Leader Jean Chrétien who was Canada's prime minister when Canada's current military involvement in Afghanistan first started in 2001. Both the Conservatives and Liberals have at various times agreed to extend the mission(s) to at least 2011, so this may result in some Canadians who are strongly against Canada's ongoing involvement, who might have otherwise typically voted either Liberal or Conservative in the past, to take their votes elsewhere in 2008.

==== Cities and infrastructure ====
Toronto Mayor David Miller has spoken out that the parties need to focus more on cities and their infrastructure, stating that 8 out of 10 Canadians live in cities, and that so far only the Green party has revealed a platform on the issue, with a national transit strategy and plans to give cities a permanent revenue source to help fix a growing infrastructure backlog. Miller stated he will not endorse a specific party, but urges people to choose a party that will "help cities thrive". He disagrees with Stephen Harper's opinion that "cities are not of national importance".

On September 18, Stéphane Dion pledged to spend more than $70 billion over the next 10 years to improve Canada's infrastructure if elected, and budget surpluses that exceed a $3-billion contingency fund to infrastructure projects, particularly those with a green focus, calling Canada's cities and towns "the engines of our economy". Stephen Harper immediately lashed out at the spending proposal, saying Dion was "promising money no government could afford" and that the Conservatives' infrastructure plans "are modest and affordable within the four-year budget we've published".

On September 23, Montreal and Toronto mayors Gérald Tremblay and David Miller laid out their demands for urban municipalities, describing cities' current financial problems as a national issue, saying that cities have become the country's economic, social and cultural development engines and need appropriate support, and that they need better "fiscal tools" to continue their role as Canada's economic engines or the country will suffer. They listed Homelessness, traffic gridlock, crowded buses and overstretched police departments as just a few of the symptoms, that "These problems are too big and too important to be solved on the backs of property taxpayers" and that "in order to remain competitive, transport goods efficiently and attract new talent, our cities require quality infrastructure, affordable housing and first-rate recreational and cultural facilities". Jean Perrault, president of the Federation of Canadian Municipalities and mayor of Sherbrooke, Quebec, has stated that things like the Federal Gas Tax Fund were an important federal commitment, but that more is needed to tackle cities' overwhelming infrastructure needs.

On September 29, Layton announced plans to direct one cent per litre of the gas tax, approximately $400 million a year, into transit projects across the country, and direct $350 million from the sale of carbon permits to big polluters, saying that "the major polluters would be the ones paying to make transit greener, not you and your families", and that "fighting climate change requires investing in transit, and that's what our plan does".

==== Economy ====
Polls have suggested that the economy is the major issue going into this election, especially with the resulting high price of gas, along with rising prices of other goods and services, such as food, and the possible impact the 2008 financial crisis may have on Canada. Some experts say that Canada has just narrowly dodged a recession, although the economy is in its worst shape since 1991.

Both Dion and Harper have said that the others' plans will lead Canada into a recession, while Dion also stated that Harper has "mismanaged a once-booming economy into one with growth dropping to among the lowest of the G8 nations".

The Conservatives have stated possible negative consequences that could happen to the economy based on Liberal election promises if they were to be elected. As of September 20, 2008, Liberal election promises have totaled in excess of $80 billion spending over the next decade. In contrast, the cost of programs promised by the Conservatives to date is less than $2 billion annually. Stephen Harper, the Prime Minister, has criticized the Liberals' spending promises, saying they are making "mind-boggling" spending plans that he predicts would send Canada into deficit.

After the rejection of the proposed bailout of the United States financial system and resulting market fluctuation all over the world, including the Toronto Stock Exchange, Jack Layton called for Harper to call a special meeting for federal party leaders to discuss the potential effects of the 2008 financial crisis on Canadians, suggestion the afternoon of October 1, since all leaders would be in Ottawa for the first Leaders' Debate that night. A spokesman for Harper later reported that Harper would not call such a meeting, and to save discussion for the Leader's Debate, as "[they] will have an opportunity later this week to debate—not behind closed doors but in front of all Canadians—the issues at stake not [just] for our economy but for our country". Harper later announced that he would ask for the 12 minutes on the economy scheduled for the Leader's Debate to be extended to an hour, citing that the 2008 financial crisis "has deepened since the debate format was finalized", a change which would require agreement from the other parties in the debate to be approved. The NDP released a statement soon after that they supported the move, while public response has been concerned that other topics such as the environment would not end up with enough time to cover the issue. All the leaders supported the idea, and the opening and closing statements were dropped and the allotted time for the economy extended to 30 minutes without affecting the other topics.

During the Leaders' Debates Harper repeatedly came under fire for lack of an economic plan in the current time of crisis and while campaigning, and for his lack of ability to explain how he would deal with the current crisis, merely repeating that Canada was unlikely to face such a crisis as he had made "different choices" than the US while in power without being able to explain what those different choices were, as all of his examples were immediately compared to practices done by the Bush administration, and insisted that Canadians "don't panic". In response to mounting pressure from the public, Harper announced on October 3 that he would reveal his party's platform, including economic matters, on October 7, one week before the election.

==== Environment ====
Shortly after the election was called, Harper was criticized for using a four-vehicle motorcade that included a van and SUV to travel the 395 m (1,296 ft) across the street from the door of 24 Sussex Drive to the door of Rideau Hall to dissolve parliament. In return, the Conservatives criticized the Liberal party's decision to use a 29-year-old Boeing 737-200 for campaigning, saying that the older airplane's poor fuel efficiency demonstrates hypocrisy on environmental matters. Daniel Lauzon, a spokesperson for the Liberals, denied their airplane was substantially less efficient than the Conservatives' Airbus A319.

The Tories have been previously criticized for backing out of Canada's commitments under the Kyoto Protocol. Their new plan requires industries to reduce the rate at which they generate greenhouse gases, with a goal of reducing overall emissions by 45 to 65 percent by 2050. The plan has been criticized by groups such as the Sierra Club, who called it "completely inadequate". Criticism has focused on the use of "intensity-based" targets, for which emission reductions are relative to overall production, so overall emissions could potentially increase if production also increases. This is in contrast to a "hard cap" on emissions, for which the overall amount cannot increase. The Conservatives' plan includes a hard cap to begin in 2020 or 2025, while environmental groups have advocated for an immediate hard cap.

The Liberals have developed a "Green Shift" plan, creating a carbon tax that will be coupled with reductions to income tax rates. The proposal was to tax greenhouse gas emissions, starting at $10 (Canadian) per ton of CO_{2} and reaching $40 (Canadian) per ton within four years. The plan would engage in revenue recycling by matching the tax with reductions in the income tax. Criticism of the Green Shift plan has focused on its economic effects, with the Conservatives predicting it would cause a "big recession". When pressed by reporters to provide evidence of this impact, Harper "wasn't able to cite a study that specifically modelled the impact of the Liberal Green Shift plan", instead citing an older economic model about the implementation of the Kyoto Protocol.

One trucking association claimed the Liberal carbon tax plan could put up to 10,000 jobs in jeopardy in Moncton alone. Environmental activist David Suzuki has come out in support of Dion's plan, saying "To oppose [the carbon tax plan], it's just nonsense. It's certainly the way we got to go" and giving an interview explaining why it is the most effective way to solve the environmental crisis.

The NDP's plan for the environment has focused on emissions trading, claiming their system will decrease greenhouse emissions by 80% by 2050. The plan includes a series of financial incentives to retrofit public transit systems and transition the economy to be "green-collar". The plan would also halt new oil sands development until emissions have been capped. Layton has also criticized the Liberal carbon tax plan, stating it taxes families instead of polluters.

==== Equalization ====
Danny Williams, the Progressive Conservative premier of Newfoundland and Labrador, launched a campaign called Anything But Conservative, primarily targeted at Harper and the federal Conservatives. He opposes a Conservative majority, due in part to Harper's promise during the 2006 election to modify the equalization formula to fully share offshore oil revenues with the province, which Williams says Harper has broken, and what Harper has stated he will do with a majority government. Accordingly, all but one member of the provincial PC caucus supported not voting Conservative in this election.

Leo Power, a veteran of federal politics and the Conservative Party of Canada's campaign co-chair for Newfoundland and Labrador, said raising money and recruiting volunteers has proved difficult, and blames Williams's ABC campaign, saying it has cut deep into the federal election machine that is struggling to compete. Power has also said his party's best hope of winning a seat in the province is in the riding of Avalon with incumbent candidate Fabian Manning. Manning was defeated by Liberal Scott Andrews, while St. John's East and St. John's South—Mount Pearl, which were represented by Conservatives not running for re-election, were won by the NDP and Liberals, respectively, leaving the Conservatives with no representatives in Newfoundland and Labrador.

==== Leadership ====
Since before the election was announced, the Conservative party ran attack ads about Dion, saying he was not a capable leader. Dion criticized the Conservatives for running the ads.

On October 9, Stephen Harper called into question the abilities of Liberal leader Dion after footage from the false starts of an interview on CTV Atlantic, and later rebroadcast on Mike Duffy Live, were aired to the public, and criticized Dion's grasp of the English language and the strength of the Liberals' plan for the Canadian economy. In the footage Dion repeatedly failed to understand the conditional perfect construction used by the interviewer in a single repeatedly asked question.

The footage shows interviewer Steve Murphy asking Dion the question: "If you were the Prime Minister now, what would you have done about the economy, and this crisis, that Mr. Harper has not done?". Dion had difficulty in understanding the question, repeatedly asking Murphy to clarify if he meant if Dion was Prime Minister now, next Tuesday on election day, last week, last month, 60 weeks ago, or two and a half years ago. Eventually, after three start overs to the interview, Dion responded with what he would do if elected Prime Minister in the future. CTV initially agreed to restart the interviews and not air the false starts but changed their minds and announced that they felt it was their responsibility to show it. Harper responded to the clips by saying that "When you're running a trillion-and-a-half-dollar economy you don't get a chance to have do-overs, over and over again" and "What this incident actually indicates very clearly is Mr. Dion and the Liberal Party really don't know what they would do on the economy", and when told that the difficulties were in part due to English being Dion's second language, Harper said: "I don't think this is a question of language at all. The question was very clear. It was asked repeatedly".

Mark Dunn, a spokesman for Dion, accused the Tories of making fun of the Liberal leader's hearing issues. Dion responded to Harper's comments, saying Harper had "no class", saying "I did not understand the question", and "Maybe it's because I have a hearing problem, maybe because [English is] my second language, but I did not understand the question". Both the Conservatives and the CTV have come under criticism for their handling of the footage, but they have stated they stand by their actions. Duceppe has called Harper's comments a "double standard", saying that many English-speaking politicians have little or no ability to speak French, yet francophones are somehow always expected to be perfect, and that the attack was an attempted "low blow". But Duceppe also took the opportunity to criticise Dion, suggesting he understood the question. "The real question is that I think Dion understood the question. The real problem wasn't the language, it was the substance," Duceppe said, "He had nothing to say". Layton also defended Dion, saying he has "struggled with questions, too".

Former Prime Minister Jean Chrétien has come out criticizing Harper's leadership abilities, noting especially Harper's controlling ways with his cabinet ministers, saying he would have quit if former prime minister Pierre Elliott Trudeau had treated him that way, that "Mr. Dion was a minister for nine years. And Mr. Harper arrived there with no experience and it shows", that the phrase 'Tory times are bad times', in use since the 1930s, was still true and that "Harper destroyed 50 years of relationships with China", Canada's second biggest trading partner after the US, noting both past Liberal and Progressive Conservative governments sought to maintain its dealings with the key trading partner. Former Prime Minister Paul Martin has also supported Dion's plans and abilities, and many have noted Dion's ability to get both Chrétien and Martin to support him, despite Chrétien and Martin's ongoing feud.

==== Listeriosis outbreak ====
The Minister of Agriculture Gerry Ritz, who has already been criticized by Canada's food scientists for his handling of the 2008 listeriosis outbreak, has also been criticized for making inappropriate comments, further angering the families of those affected. Ritz had joked about the outbreak while he was on a conference call with scientists and political staffers on August 30, saying the political fallout from the outbreak was "like a death by a thousand cuts, or should I say cold cuts". In addition, when he was informed of a listeriosis-related death in Prince Edward Island, he quipped: "Please tell me it's [Liberal agriculture critic] Wayne Easter". Despite calls for Ritz's resignation from the other parties and the public, Stephen Harper has supported Ritz and rebuffed calls for his resignation.

The Public Service Alliance of Canada revealed to the media that the Conservative party plans to cut federal funding to meat inspection programs by $3 million, effectively ending their operation in Manitoba, Saskatchewan and British Columbia.

==== Speech plagiarism ====
On September 30, it was revealed by Bob Rae of the Liberal Party that on March 20, 2003, Stephen Harper had plagiarized a speech that called for troops to be deployed to Iraq to assist the US invasion from Australian Prime Minister John Howard, which Howard had delivered two days before, on March 18.

Following Rae's statement, Harper's spokesman Kory Teneycke dismissed the issue as irrelevant, saying "I'm not going to get into a debate about a five-year-old speech that was delivered three Parliaments ago, two elections ago, when the prime minister was the leader of a party that no longer exists".

The Canadian Alliance staff member and former Fraser Institute policy analyst, Owen Lippert, who wrote that speech was working on the current election campaign at Conservative campaign headquarters. On September 30, 2008, he issued a statement and resigned as a result of the incident.

He stated:

Pressed for time, I was overzealous in copying segments of another world leader's speech. Neither my superiors in the Office of the Leader of the Opposition nor the leader of the Opposition was aware that I had done so.

On October 3, there was a second plagiarism allegation from the Liberals, who said that Harper had copied several sentences from a speech by former Ontario premier Mike Harris. Harper denied the allegation, saying "we're talking about a couple of sentences of fairly standard political rhetoric".

On October 6, the Conservatives contended that Dion had also committed plagiarism when, as Minister of the Environment in 2005, he went to a United Nations conference on climate change to deliver a speech which had substantial similarities to the executive summary of a year old UN report. The Liberal party did not respond to the plagiarism allegation.

== Controversies ==
=== Missing ballot boxes ===
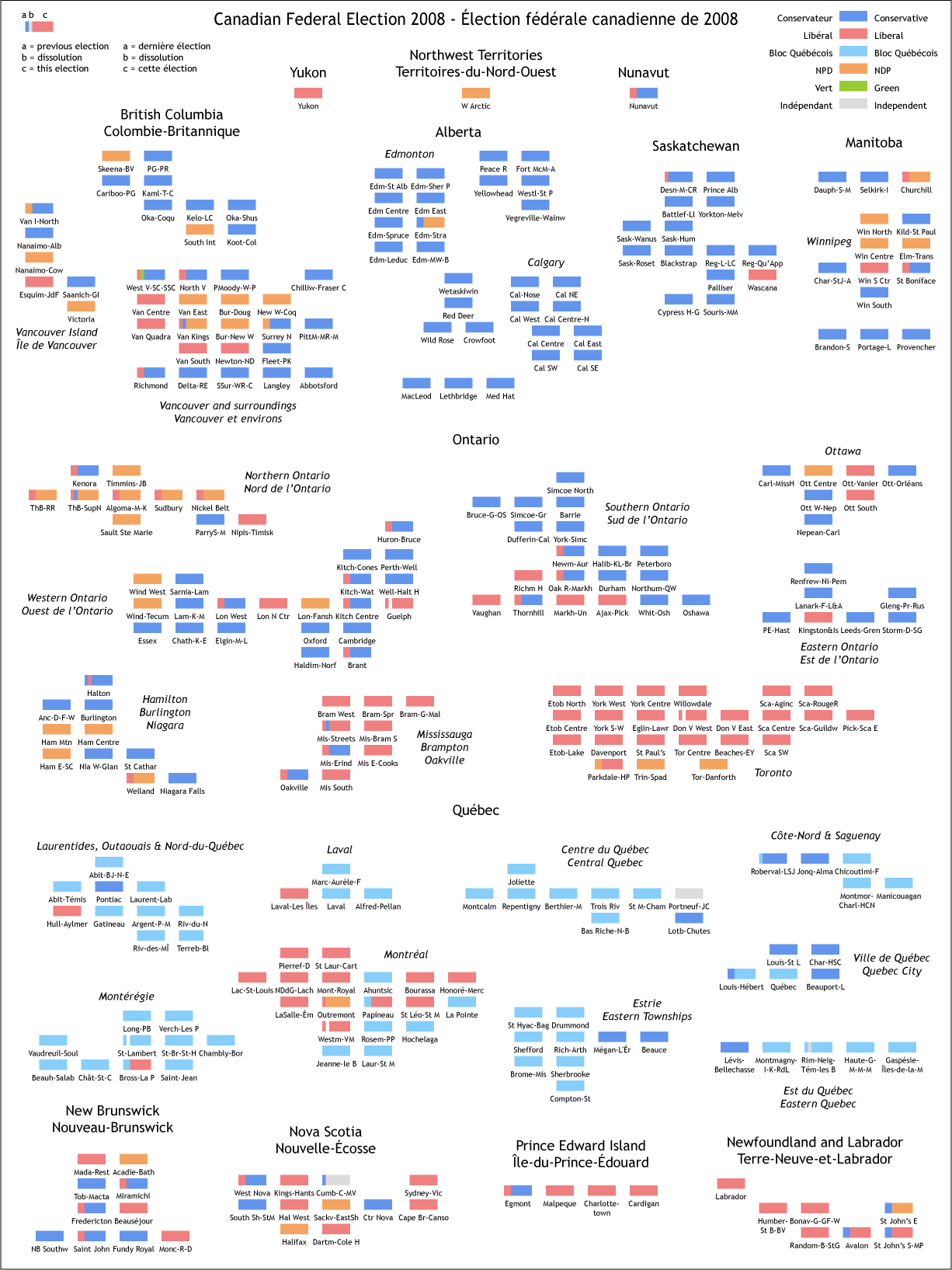
Graphic display of results of 2008 Canadian federal election across the provinces.

In Quebec City, several ballot boxes containing votes from advance polls disappeared after the close of advance polling on October 7. The boxes were stored in a closet at the home of a deputy returning officer. Although there was no tampering of the boxes or the votes, three deputy returning officers were fired. Deputy returning officers are the only polling officials allowed to handle ballots during the vote count and the law did allow for them to store the sealed boxes as may be necessary in large remote rural ridings. However the boxes were returned a day late after the riding returning officer ordered their return.

=== Strategic voting ===
A number of political leaders and popular websites supported strategic voting in the election, mostly against the Conservative Party. The reasons varied from regional, such as Newfoundland and Labrador premier Danny Williams and his "Anything But Conservative" campaign, to ideological. The popular website VoteForEnvironment.ca, which received over one million page views in the first 12 days of its existence and whose founders were interviewed on CBC and other mainstream media, showed regional breakdowns per riding and offered recommendations based on which candidate was most likely to beat the Conservative candidate. If the Conservative candidate had little chance of winning the riding or was strongly entrenched, the site recommended "vote with your heart". Similarly, a vote swapping organization on Facebook entitled "Anti-Harper Vote Swap Canada" also gained press. The premise of that organization is that eligible voters in different electoral districts may exchange their votes, so that an opponent of a Conservative candidate in each district might have a better chance of being elected in that district. Elections Canada deemed the practice legal.

Green Party leader Elizabeth May sent out mixed signals about strategic voting. On October 12, she recommended that in close ridings, supporters of green policies should consider voting for the NDP or Liberals to defeat the Conservatives, but on the same day she said: "I do not support strategic voting and I have not advised voters to choose any candidate other than Green". In addition, during the final days of the campaign the Liberals attempted to attract strategic NDP and Green votes to stop the Conservatives, and the Conservatives attempted to attract Bloc votes to stop the Liberals.

=== Voter identification ===
Some students, homeless, and transient voters were turned away at the polls when they were unable to provide identification showing or otherwise confirming a place of residence. Legislation introduced in 2007 requires all voters to show one or two pieces of identification which confirm the voter's name and address, or to be vouched for by another voter who is able to show such identification.

Region	Turnout (%)
Alberta	52.9
British Columbia	61.0
Manitoba	56.8
New Brunswick	62.8
Newfoundland and Labrador	48.1
Northwest Territories	48.6
Nova Scotia	60.7
Nunavut	49.4
Ontario	59.1
Prince Edward Island	69.5
Saskatchewan	59.4
Quebec	61.1
Yukon	63.7

=== Voter turnout ===
Voter turnout at 58.8% was the lowest in Canadian federal election history, and the only time it has ever dipped below the 60% threshold. All federally funded parties except for the Greens attracted fewer total votes than in 2006; the Greens received nearly 280,000 more votes. The Conservatives lost about 170,000 votes, the Liberals 850,000, the Bloc 170,000 and the NDP 70,000. Some voters were at first turned away because of failure to meet new and stricter proof of address requirements, including 2/3 of those attempting to vote at Dalhousie University, for example. The effect this may have had on voter turnout is unknown.

=== Judicial recounts ===
In a federal election, a judicial recount is automatically ordered in a riding where the margin of victory is less than 0.1% (one one-thousandth) of the votes cast. In cases where there is a larger but still narrow margin of victory, an elector can request a judicial recount.

Judicial recounts were ordered in six ridings. In one case, Brossard—La Prairie, the judicial recount overturned the reported victor, giving the seat to the Liberals' Alexandra Mendès instead of the Bloc incumbent Marcel Lussier.

In four other ridings, the recount confirmed the election results, although Liberal Ujjal Dosanjh's margin in Vancouver South was reduced from 33 votes to just 20. This was the slimmest victory of any riding in the entire election, until the results of the Kitchener-Waterloo recount reduced Peter Braid's margin of victory to a mere 17 votes. Dosanjh's Conservative opponent, Wai Young, appealed the recount to the Supreme Court of British Columbia, citing that not all of the ballot boxes were fully recounted. All ballots were eventually counted by November 4, confirming Dosanjh's victory by 20 votes, after the initial partial recount indicated a margin of 22 votes.

In a sixth riding, the recount was cancelled when the elector who had requested it withdrew the request.

Riding	Initial validated results - First and second place			Recount type	Recount date	Judicially certified results - First and second place		
Riding	Candidate	Votes	%	Recount type	Recount date	Candidate	Votes	%
Egmont, PEI	Gail Shea, Con.	8,122	44.0%	Requested	October 23, 2008	Gail Shea, Con.	8,110	43.9%
Egmont, PEI	Keith Milligan, Lib.	8,060	43.6%	Requested	October 23, 2008	Keith Milligan, Lib.	8,055	43.6%
Brossard—La Prairie, QC	Marcel Lussier, BQ	19,202	32.6%	Requested	October 24, 2008	Alexandra Mendès, Lib.	19,103	32.6%
Brossard—La Prairie, QC	Alexandra Mendès, Lib.	19,110	32.4%	Requested	October 24, 2008	Marcel Lussier, BQ	19,034	32.5%
Brampton West, ON	Andrew Kania, Lib.	21,739	40.3%	Requested	November 6, 2008	Andrew Kania, Lib.	21,746	40.3%
Brampton West, ON	Kyle Seeback, Con.	21,516	39.9%	Requested	November 6, 2008	Kyle Seeback, Con.	21,515	39.9%
Kitchener—Waterloo, ON	Peter Braid, Cons.	21,851	36.1%	Automatic	October 31, 2008	Peter Braid, Cons.	21,830	36.1%
Kitchener—Waterloo, ON	Andrew Telegdi, Lib.	21,803	36.0%	Automatic	October 31, 2008	Andrew Telegdi, Lib.	21,813	36.0%
Esquimalt—Juan de Fuca, BC	Keith Martin, Lib.	20,042	34.2%	Requested	Judicial recount terminated at the request of the elector who had requested it			
Esquimalt—Juan de Fuca, BC	Troy DeSouza, Con.	19,974	34.1%	Requested	Judicial recount terminated at the request of the elector who had requested it			
Vancouver South, BC	Ujjal Dosanjh, Lib.	16,101	38.5%	Automatic	November 4, 2008	Ujjal Dosanjh, Lib.	16,110	38.5%
Vancouver South, BC	Wai Young, Con.	16,068	38.4%	Automatic	November 4, 2008	Wai Young, Con.	16,090	38.4%

==== Candidates ====
===== Conservative =====
Chris Reid, the Conservative candidate from Toronto Centre, resigned over controversial statements on his blog, which advocated revising Canadian gun control legislation to legalize concealed carriage of handguns. He was replaced by David Gentili.

The Conservatives apologized after an aide to Pontiac candidate Lawrence Cannon told Aboriginal protesters that they were free to meet with Cannon "if you behave and you're sober and there's no problems and if you don't do a sit down and whatever".

===== Liberal =====
Liberal candidate Simon Bédard was also asked to resign after he reiterated his 1990 comments, suggesting that lethal force should have been used in the Oka Crisis.

Liberal candidate Lesley Hughes was dropped by the Liberal Party after making controversial comments about the September 11, 2001 attacks. She continued to campaign as an independent, though she appeared as a Liberal on the ballot.

===== NDP =====
Andrew McKeever, an NDP candidate in Durham, announced on October 3 that he would resign from the election campaign after it was revealed that he had posted comments on Facebook in which he called one war activist a "fascist bitch" and threatened to beat up another person. Mr. McKeever wrote comments peppered with expletives and calling the operators of a war resister website "Nazis". McKeever was also quoted as saying "I like the part in Schindler's List when the guard starts waxing the prisoners." McKeever's decision to drop out of the race came with just over a week left in the campaign, meaning his name would remain on the ballot. One week before the publication of McKeever's resignation, NDP leader Jack Layton defended McKeever and refused to make him step down.

Julian West, the candidate for the riding of Saanich—Gulf Islands, dropped out of the race after details surfaced about an environmental event he attended 12 years ago when he went skinny-dipping and asked two teenagers to body-paint him. Two other candidates in British Columbia who were proponents of marijuana decriminalization — Dana Larsen and Kirk Tousaw — resigned earlier after videos they had produced for Internet site Pot-TV were released to the media. One of the videos, filmed in 2000, showed Mr. Larsen, former leader of the BC Marijuana Party, preparing to light up a joint before driving a car, after having taken the short-acting hallucinogenic drug DMT earlier in the evening.

===== Green =====
John Shavluk, the Green candidate in Newton—North Delta, was removed from the party's slate of candidates on September 4, just before the election call, after it was revealed that he had previously published comments in his blog about the September 11 attacks in 2001, in which he referred to the World Trade Center as "the shoddily built Jewish world bank headquarters". He was replaced by Liz Walker as the Green Party candidate, but remained on the ballot as an independent.

===== Independent =====
At an all-candidates debate staged for a high school student audience in Sudbury on September 29, independent candidate David Popescu responded to a question about same-sex marriage by stating that "homosexuals should be executed". His remarks were widely criticized across Canada, and the Greater Sudbury Police Service announced an investigation into whether the comments constituted a crime under Canadian hate speech legislation. He was subsequently investigated by the Toronto Police as well, after a radio interview on October 2 in which he specifically advocated the execution of Egale Canada executive director Helen Kennedy.

==== Vandalism ====
Supporters of Ontario Liberal MPs Carolyn Bennett (St. Paul's) and Gerard Kennedy (Parkdale—High Park) who had Liberal signs outside their houses were subject to vandalism during the later hours of October 3, including graffiti, phone and cable lines being cut, and damage to vehicles that included brake cutting. Toronto police reported over 30 incidents of vandalism as of October 6. Some of the victims did not realize their brakes had been cut until they were in traffic, and there was at least one near-accident. Liberal Senator Jerry Grafstein was one of the residents who reported vandalism to his car.

Vandalism was also reported at the campaign offices of Trinity—Spadina Liberal candidate Christine Innes and Beaches—East York New Democratic Party candidate Marilyn Churley, as well as in Niagara Falls.

==== Legality of the election ====
After the election was called, Democracy Watch, an Ottawa-based advocacy group, filed a legal suit claiming that the election call was illegal because it violated the 2007 amendments to the Canada Elections Act. These amendments, introduced by the Harper government, set fixed dates for elections, and fulfilled a 2006 promise made by Harper to end the Prime Minister's ability to call snap elections.

On September 17, 2009, the Federal Court of Canada ruled that the election was not unfair, and therefore not illegal. Democracy Watch's appeal to the Federal Court of Appeal was also dismissed, and the Supreme Court denied leave to hear a further appeal.

== Target seats ==
The following is a list of ridings which had narrowly been lost by the indicated party in the 2006 election. For instance, under the Liberal column are the 15 seats in which they came closest to winning but did not. Listed is the name of the riding, followed by the party which was victorious (in parentheses) and the margin, in terms of percentage of the vote, by which the party lost.

These ridings were targeted by the specified party because the party had lost them by a very slim margin in the 2006 election.

Up to 15 are shown, with a maximum margin of victory of 15%.

* Indicates incumbent not running again. To clarify further; this is a list of federal election winners with their party in parentheses, and their margin as a percentage of the vote over the party whose list the seat is on (not the same as the margin of victory if the party potentially "targeting" the seat in that list did not finish second in the previous election). "Won" means that the targeting party won the seat from the incumbent party. "Held" means the incumbent party held the seat.

Conservative	Liberal
1. Desnethé—Missinippi—Churchill River, SK (Lib) 0.3%* (won)† 2. Brant, ON (Lib) 0.9% (won); 3. West Nova, NS (Lib) 1.1% (won); 4. Vancouver Island North, BC (NDP) 1.1% (won); 5. Oakville, ON (Lib) 1.3% (won); 6. West Vancouver—Sunshine Coast—Sea to Sky Country, BC (Lib) 1.5% (won)‡; 7. Huron—Bruce, ON (Lib) 1.8%* (won); 8. London West, ON (Lib) 2.2% (won); 9. Madawaska—Restigouche, NB (Lib) 2.4% (held); 10. Newton—North Delta, BC (Lib) 3.6% (held); 11. Saint Boniface, MB (Lib) 3.6% (won); 12. Saint John, NB (Lib) 3.6% (won); 13. Mississauga South, ON (Lib) 4.1% (held); 14. Richmond, BC (Lib) 4.1% (won); 15. Random—Burin—St. George's, NL (Lib) 4.7% (held)	1. Parry Sound-Muskoka, ON (Con) <0.1% (held); 2. Winnipeg South, MB (Con) 0.3% (held); 3. Glengarry—Prescott—Russell, ON (Con) 0.4% (held); 4. Tobique—Mactaquac, NB (Con) 0.9% (held); 5. St. Catharines, ON (Con) 1.1% (held); 6. Ahuntsic, QC (BQ) 1.7% (held); 7. Fleetwood—Port Kells, BC (Con) 1.9% (held); 8. London—Fanshawe, ON (NDP) 1.9% (held); 9. Ottawa—Orléans, ON (Con) 2.0% (held); 10. Simcoe North, ON (Con) 2.0% (held); 11. Brossard—La Prairie, QC (BQ) 2.2% (won); 12. Papineau, QC (BQ) 2.2% (won); 13. Burnaby—Douglas, BC (NDP) 2.6% (held); 14. Barrie, ON (Con) 2.7% (held); 15. Kitchener—Conestoga, ON (Con) 2.7% (held)
Bloc Québécois	New Democratic
1. Louis-Hébert, QC (Con) 0.4% (won); 2. Beauport—Limoilou, QC (Con) 1.6% (held); 3. Charlesbourg—Haute-Saint-Charles, QC (Con) 2.7% (held); 4. Hull—Aylmer, QC (Lib) 3.3% (held); 5. Honoré-Mercier, QC (Lib) 3.8% (held); 6. Pontiac, QC (Con) 5.0% (held); 7. Laval—Les Îles, QC (Lib) 6.1% (held); 8. Outremont, QC (Lib) 6.3%¹ (held by NDP); 9. Bourassa, QC (Lib) 11.4% (held); 10. Jonquière—Alma, QC (Con) 12.8% (held); 11. Portneuf—Jacques-Cartier, QC (Ind) 13.9% (held)	1. Thunder Bay—Superior North, ON (Lib) 1.0%* (won); 2. Newton—North Delta, BC (Lib) 1.6% (held); 3. Thunder Bay—Rainy River, ON (Lib) 1.7% (won); 4. Algoma—Manitoulin—Kapuskasing, ON (Lib) 3.7% (won); 5. Nickel Belt, ON (Lib) 4.6%* * (won); 6. Esquimalt—Juan de Fuca, BC (Lib) 4.6% (held); 7. Welland, ON (Lib) 4.8% (won); 8. Oshawa, ON (Con) 5.2% (held); 9. Pitt Meadows—Maple Ridge—Mission, BC (Con) 5.2% (held); 10. Beaches—East York, ON (Lib) 5.4% (held); 11. Kenora, ON (Lib) 5.7% (won by Conservatives); 12. Saskatoon—Rosetown—Biggar, SK (Con) 6.5%* (held); 13. Central Nova, NS (Con) 7.8% (held); 14. South Shore—St. Margaret's, NS (Con) 8.3% (held); 15. Fleetwood—Port Kells, BC (Con) 8.3% (held)
† Won by the Conservatives in an intervening by-election with more than a 15% margin over the Liberals. ‡ The incumbent had become an independent and was sitting as a Green at the time of dissolution. ¹ Won by the NDP in an intervening by-election with more than a 19% margin over the Liberals.

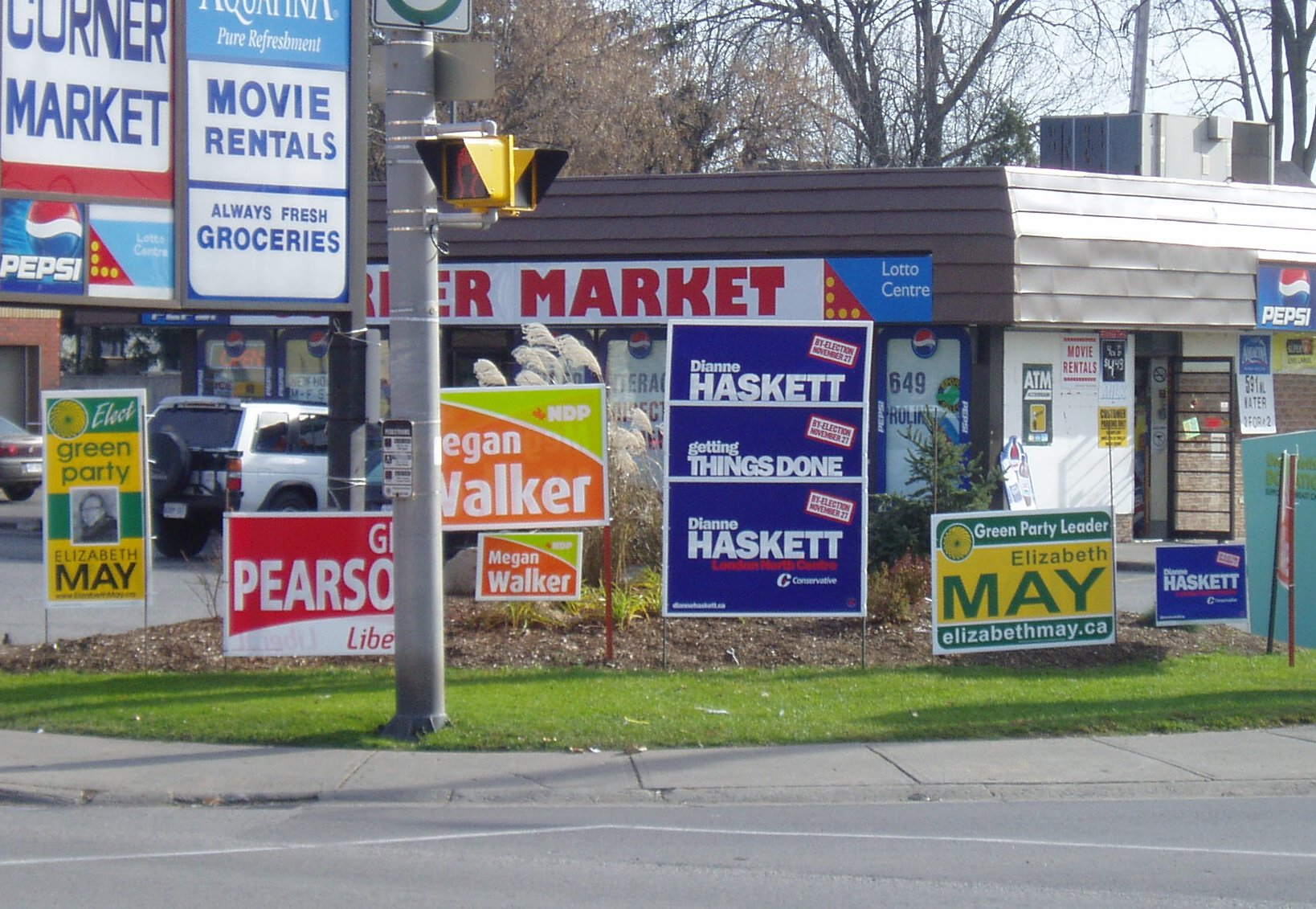
Lawn signs for all the major candidates decorate an intersection during the London North Centre by-election

- The Green Party of Canada did not come within 15% of winning any riding in the 2006 election, but came 9.0% short of winning London North Centre, ON (Lib) in a November 2006 by-election.

=== Targeted Cabinet ministers ===
The following Cabinet ministers were elected by a margin of less than 10% in 2006:

1. Tony Clement, Health and Federal Economic Initiative for Northern Ontario: 0.1% over Lib in Parry Sound-Muskoka, ON
2. Lawrence Cannon, Transport, Infrastructure and Communities: 5.0% over BQ in Pontiac, QC
3. Jim Flaherty, Finance: 5.7% over Lib in Whitby—Oshawa, ON
4. Rob Nicholson, Justice: 5.9% over Lib in Niagara Falls, ON
5. Peter MacKay, Defence and Atlantic Opportunities: 7.8% over NDP in Central Nova, NS
6. John Baird, Environment: 9.0% over Lib in Ottawa West—Nepean, ON

== Potential fall of government ==
Pie chart detailing the percentage of seats won in the House of Commons

On December 1, 2008, as the result of opposition dissatisfaction with the government's economic update (which failed to include stimulus measures to help the Canadian economy contend with the 2008 financial crisis and included a 'poison pill' regarding the cessation of public party financing), the leaders of the Liberal Party, New Democratic Party, and Bloc Québécois announced they had reached an agreement to approach the Governor General for the purpose of forming a coalition government. Combined, the three opposition parties constitute a majority of seats in the House of Commons. Parliament was due to vote on a no-confidence motion on December 8; if successful, the Liberals and NDP would have formally asked the Governor General to form a coalition minority government for 30 months, while the BQ pledged to support for at least 18 months. Liberal leader Stéphane Dion would have become prime minister until the selection of his successor at the Liberal leadership convention in May 2009, and a coalition cabinet would have comprised 18 Liberal (including a finance minister) and 6 NDP ministers. Governor General Michaëlle Jean had cut short a state visit to Europe "in light of the current political situation in Canada". On December 4, 2008, Jean granted Harper's request to prorogue Parliament until January 26, 2009, thereby staving off the prospect of an imminent change in government. Dion stood down as Liberal leader on December 10 and was replaced by interim leader Michael Ignatieff, who would later be elected unopposed as permanent leader. Ignatieff soon ended the coalition agreement with the other two parties, motivated largely in part by Harper's publicly indicating that he would advise Jean to hold a new election (which, under the precedent set by the King–Byng affair, she would have been obligated to do) rather than recommending that Ignatieff be allowed to form a minority government should the government lose a confidence vote, and polling indicating that any such election would almost certainly result in the Conservatives winning a strong majority.

== Opinion polls ==
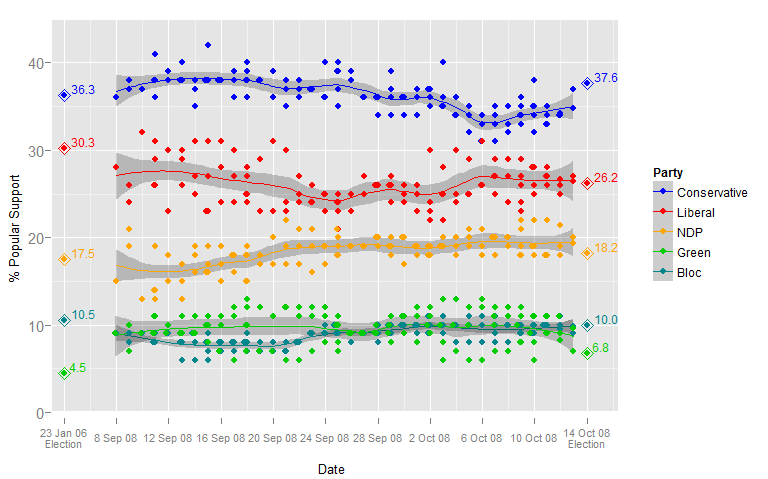
Plot of Opinion Polls during the election period

== Candidates by party ==
- Bloc Québécois candidates, 2008 Canadian federal election
- Christian Heritage Party candidates, 2008 Canadian federal election
- Conservative Party candidates, 2008 Canadian federal election
- Green Party candidates, 2008 Canadian federal election
- Liberal Party candidates, 2008 Canadian federal election
- New Democratic Party candidates, 2008 Canadian federal election

== Results ==

Elections to the 40th Canadian Parliament (2008)
Party	Leader	Candidates	Votes				Seats				
Party	Leader	Candidates	#	±	%	Change (pp)	2006	2008	±	G	L
Conservative	Stephen Harper	307 (Note: The Conservatives chose not to field a candidate in Portneuf—Jacques-Cartier, as the incumbent Independent MP André Arthur consistently sided with them in votes in the House.)	5,209,069	165,002▼	37.65	1.38	124	143 / 308	19▲	25	6
Liberal	Stéphane Dion	307 (Note: The Liberals opted not to field a candidate in Central Nova, so as not to oppose Elizabeth May in her campaign for a Green seat.) (Note: Lesley Hughes of Kildonan—St. Paul was nominated as a Liberal, but lost party support after the nomination deadline and continued to run as an independent; she was listed as a Liberal on the ballot.)	3,633,185	846,230▼	26.26	-3.97	103	77 / 308	26▼	5	31
New Democratic	Jack Layton	308 (Note: Includes Julian West (Saanich—Gulf Islands) and Andrew McKeever (Durham), who withdrew their candidacies but still appeared on the ballot.)	2,515,288	74,309▼	18.18	0.70	29	37 / 308	8▲	11	3
Bloc Québécois	Gilles Duceppe	75	1,379,991	173,210▼	9.98	-0.51	51	49 / 308	2▼	1	3
Green	Elizabeth May	303	937,613	273,545▲	6.78	2.30					
Independent		71	94,844	12,984▲	0.69	0.13	1	2 / 308	1▲	1	–
Christian Heritage	Ron Gray	59	26,475	1,677▼	0.19	–					
Marxist–Leninist	Anna Di Carlo	59	8,565	415▼	0.06	–					
Libertarian	Dennis Young	26	7,300	4,298▲	0.05	0.03					
Progressive Canadian	Sinclair Stevens	10	5,860	8,291▼	0.04	-0.05					
Communist	Miguel Figueroa	24	3,572	550▲	0.03	0.01					
Canadian Action	Connie Fogal	20	3,455	2,647▼	0.02	-0.02					
Marijuana	Blair Longley	8	2,298	6,873▼	0.02	-0.05					
neorhino.ca	François Gourd	7	2,122	2,122▲	0.02	New					
Newfoundland and Labrador First	Tom Hickey	3	1,713	1,713▲	0.01	New					
First Peoples National	Barbara Wardlaw	6	1,611	410 ▲	0.01	–					
Animal Alliance	Liz White	4	527	455▲	–	–					
Work Less	Conrad Schmidt	1	425	425▲	–	New					
Western Block	Doug Christie	1	195	899▼	–	-0.01					
People's Political Power	Roger Poisson	2	186	186▲	–	New					
Total		1,601	13,834,294		100.00%						
Rejected ballots			94,799	3,255▲							
Turnout			13,929,093	979,610▼	58.83%	5.84▼					
Registered voters			23,677,639	623,024▲							

=== Synopsis of results ===
Results by riding — 2008 Canadian federal election
Riding		2006	Winning party					Turnout (Note: including spoilt ballots)	Votes (Note: minor political parties receiving less than 1% of the national popular vote are aggregated under "Other"; independent candidates are aggregated separately)							
Riding		2006	Party	Votes	Share	Margin #	Margin %	Turnout	Con	Lib	NDP	BQ	Green	Ind	Other	Total
AB	Calgary Centre	Con	Con	26,085	55.60%	17,683	37.69%	53.16%	26,085	8,402	4,229	–	7,778	420	–	46,914
AB	Calgary Centre-North	Con	Con	27,361	56.54%	19,948	41.22%	56.29%	27,361	5,699	7,413	–	7,392	–	529	48,394
AB	Calgary East	Con	Con	21,311	66.47%	17,543	54.72%	41.79%	21,311	3,255	3,768	–	3,403	–	323	32,060
AB	Calgary Northeast	Con	Con	18,917	51.52%	11,484	31.27%	44.39%	18,917	7,433	3,279	–	2,045	4,836	211	36,721
AB	Calgary—Nose Hill	Con	Con	35,029	69.62%	28,372	56.39%	53.86%	35,029	6,657	3,941	–	4,685	–	–	50,312
AB	Calgary Southeast	Con	Con	41,425	73.89%	35,689	63.66%	57.15%	41,425	4,878	4,024	–	5,736	–	–	56,063
AB	Calgary Southwest	Con	Con	38,548	72.96%	33,630	63.65%	58.39%	38,548	4,918	4,102	–	4,743	–	521	52,832
AB	Calgary West	Con	Con	34,579	57.36%	21,375	35.46%	60.96%	34,579	13,204	3,832	–	6,722	1,790	155	60,282
AB	Crowfoot	Con	Con	39,342	82.03%	35,559	74.15%	54.86%	39,342	1,958	3,783	–	2,875	–	–	47,958
AB	Edmonton Centre	Con	Con	22,634	49.04%	9,973	21.61%	51.57%	22,634	12,661	6,912	–	3,746	–	203	46,156
AB	Edmonton East	Con	Con	21,487	51.32%	8,169	19.51%	45.43%	21,487	4,578	13,318	–	2,488	–	–	41,871
AB	Edmonton—Leduc	Con	Con	33,174	63.21%	23,940	45.61%	56.64%	33,174	9,234	5,994	–	4,081	–	–	52,483
AB	Edmonton—Mill Woods—Beaumont	Con	Con	25,130	60.32%	17,421	41.82%	52.09%	25,130	7,709	6,297	–	2,366	–	157	41,659
AB	Edmonton—St. Albert	Con	Con	31,436	61.65%	23,391	45.87%	53.67%	31,436	7,441	8,045	–	4,072	–	–	50,994
AB	Edmonton—Sherwood Park	Con	Con	17,628	35.84%	1,668	3.39%	55.09%	17,628	5,575	6,339	–	3,678	15,960	–	49,180
AB	Edmonton—Spruce Grove	Con	Con	36,402	68.55%	29,775	56.07%	53.52%	36,402	6,099	6,627	–	3,975	–	–	53,103
AB	Edmonton—Strathcona	Con	NDP	20,103	42.58%	463	0.98%	62.86%	19,640	4,279	20,103	–	3,040	–	147	47,209
AB	Fort McMurray—Athabasca	Con	Con	17,160	67.12%	13,860	54.21%	35.82%	17,160	2,710	3,300	–	1,628	350	419	25,567
AB	Lethbridge	Con	Con	31,714	66.96%	24,981	52.74%	53.29%	31,714	4,404	6,733	–	3,420	–	1,094	47,365
AB	Macleod	Con	Con	35,328	77.36%	31,167	68.25%	56.39%	35,328	2,703	3,053	–	4,161	–	422	45,667
AB	Medicine Hat	Con	Con	26,950	70.87%	22,763	59.86%	46.20%	26,950	2,639	4,187	–	2,338	1,551	363	38,028
AB	Peace River	Con	Con	29,550	69.51%	23,426	55.11%	44.24%	29,550	2,843	6,124	–	3,303	–	689	42,509
AB	Red Deer	Con	Con	33,226	73.24%	28,186	62.13%	49.87%	33,226	2,863	5,040	–	4,239	–	–	45,368
AB	Vegreville—Wainwright	Con	Con	34,493	77.09%	30,263	67.64%	54.03%	34,493	2,345	4,230	–	3,676	–	–	44,744
AB	Westlock—St. Paul	Con	Con	27,338	72.71%	23,529	62.58%	51.13%	27,338	3,418	3,809	–	2,522	–	510	37,597
AB	Wetaskiwin	Con	Con	32,528	77.14%	28,892	68.51%	52.94%	32,528	2,362	3,636	–	3,395	–	249	42,170
AB	Wild Rose	Con	Con	36,869	72.92%	30,479	60.28%	56.18%	36,869	2,890	4,169	–	6,390	–	246	50,564
AB	Yellowhead	Con	Con	26,863	71.85%	22,276	59.58%	49.97%	26,863	1,489	4,587	–	3,437	–	1,014	37,390
BC	Abbotsford	Con	Con	30,853	63.32%	22,920	47.04%	59.50%	30,853	7,933	6,444	–	3,141	–	358	48,729
BC	British Columbia Southern Interior	NDP	NDP	22,693	47.51%	5,571	11.66%	63.89%	17,122	3,292	22,693	–	4,573	–	80	47,760
BC	Burnaby—Douglas	NDP	NDP	17,937	37.94%	798	1.69%	57.70%	17,139	9,177	17,937	–	2,822	–	203	47,278
BC	Burnaby—New Westminster	NDP	NDP	20,145	46.50%	6,995	16.15%	54.35%	13,150	6,681	20,145	–	3,067	–	282	43,325
BC	Cariboo—Prince George	Con	Con	22,637	55.39%	12,056	29.50%	54.32%	22,637	4,309	10,581	–	2,614	729	–	40,870
BC	Chilliwack—Fraser Canyon	Con	Con	29,198	62.32%	20,407	43.56%	57.52%	29,198	3,990	8,791	–	4,107	–	766	46,852
BC	Delta—Richmond East	Con	Con	26,252	55.75%	15,881	33.73%	60.06%	26,252	10,371	6,803	–	3,663	–	–	47,089
BC	Esquimalt—Juan de Fuca (Note: recount terminated at request of applicant)	Lib	Lib	20,042	34.18%	68	0.12%	64.57%	19,974	20,042	13,322	–	4,854	309	130	58,631
BC	Fleetwood—Port Kells	Con	Con	21,389	44.70%	8,887	18.57%	55.57%	21,389	12,502	10,916	–	3,045	–	–	47,852
BC	Kamloops—Thompson—Cariboo	Con	Con	25,209	46.16%	5,608	10.27%	62.02%	25,209	5,375	19,601	–	4,430	–	–	54,615
BC	Kelowna—Lake Country	Con	Con	31,907	55.94%	23,283	40.82%	58.76%	31,907	8,469	8,624	–	7,821	–	218	57,039
BC	Kootenay—Columbia	Con	Con	23,402	59.59%	14,510	36.95%	59.76%	23,402	3,044	8,892	–	3,933	–	–	39,271
BC	Langley	Con	Con	32,594	61.46%	23,696	44.68%	61.94%	32,594	5,888	8,898	–	5,059	–	594	53,033
BC	Nanaimo—Alberni	Con	Con	28,930	46.68%	9,250	14.93%	64.77%	28,930	5,578	19,680	–	7,457	–	331	61,976
BC	Nanaimo—Cowichan	NDP	NDP	27,454	45.17%	4,610	7.58%	63.45%	22,844	4,483	27,454	–	5,816	–	182	60,779
BC	New Westminster—Coquitlam	NDP	NDP	20,787	41.83%	1,488	2.99%	61.74%	19,299	5,615	20,787	–	3,574	–	417	49,692
BC	Newton—North Delta	Lib	Lib	16,481	36.42%	2,493	5.51%	62.07%	13,988	16,481	11,824	–	2,533	305	121	45,252
BC	North Vancouver	Lib	Con	24,371	42.26%	2,820	4.89%	66.45%	24,371	21,551	5,417	–	6,168	–	166	57,673
BC	Okanagan—Coquihalla	Con	Con	28,765	58.13%	20,529	41.48%	59.63%	28,765	5,883	8,236	–	6,603	–	–	49,487
BC	Okanagan—Shuswap	Con	Con	28,002	51.72%	17,338	32.02%	60.71%	28,002	5,414	10,664	–	9,368	416	278	54,142
BC	Pitt Meadows—Maple Ridge—Mission	Con	Con	26,512	51.81%	9,618	18.80%	60.24%	26,512	3,394	16,894	–	3,833	238	300	51,171
BC	Port Moody—Westwood—Port Coquitlam	Con	Con	25,535	54.61%	15,117	32.33%	58.83%	25,535	6,918	10,418	–	3,568	–	321	46,760
BC	Prince George—Peace River	Con	Con	22,325	63.59%	16,155	46.02%	48.89%	22,325	2,954	6,170	–	3,656	–	–	35,105
BC	Richmond	Lib	Con	21,359	49.81%	8,138	18.98%	51.99%	21,359	13,221	5,059	–	2,753	486	–	42,878
BC	Saanich—Gulf Islands	Con	Con	27,991	43.42%	2,625	4.07%	70.40%	27,991	25,366	3,667	–	6,742	–	694	64,460
BC	Skeena—Bulkley Valley	NDP	NDP	17,219	49.84%	4,658	13.48%	56.51%	12,561	1,916	17,219	–	1,613	–	1,237	34,546
BC	South Surrey—White Rock—Cloverdale	Con	Con	31,216	56.65%	19,701	35.75%	65.08%	31,216	11,515	7,146	–	4,951	–	273	55,101
BC	Surrey North	NDP	Con	13,714	39.37%	1,106	3.18%	51.56%	13,714	5,227	12,608	–	1,925	271	1,088	34,833
BC	Vancouver Centre	Lib	Lib	19,506	34.51%	5,318	9.41%	59.37%	14,188	19,506	12,047	–	10,354	–	434	56,529
BC	Vancouver East	NDP	NDP	22,506	54.40%	15,379	37.18%	53.51%	6,432	7,127	22,506	–	4,708	–	596	41,369
BC	Vancouver Island North	NDP	Con	25,963	45.78%	2,497	4.40%	64.58%	25,963	2,380	23,466	–	4,544	362	–	56,715
BC	Vancouver Kingsway	Lib	NDP	15,933	35.18%	2,769	6.11%	56.45%	12,419	13,164	15,933	–	3,031	–	749	45,296
BC	Vancouver Quadra	Lib	Lib	25,393	45.59%	4,832	8.68%	63.37%	20,561	25,393	4,493	–	4,916	–	333	55,696
BC	Vancouver South	Lib	Lib	16,110	38.49%	20	0.05%	52.42%	16,090	16,110 (Note: Ujjal Dosanjh was previously an NDP member of the Legislative Assembly of British Columbia, and was Premier of British Columbia until 2001.)	7,376	–	2,065	–	211	41,852
BC	Victoria	NDP	NDP	26,443	44.61%	10,106	17.05%	67.48%	16,337	10,006	26,443	–	6,252	–	237	59,275
BC	West Vancouver—Sunshine Coast—Sea to Sky Country	Lib	Con	26,949	44.57%	10,880	17.99%	63.36%	26,949	16,069	8,728	–	8,723	–	–	60,469
MB	Brandon—Souris	Con	Con	19,558	57.06%	13,503	39.40%	55.96%	19,558	2,836	6,055	–	5,410	–	416	34,275
MB	Charleswood—St. James—Assiniboia	Con	Con	21,588	53.83%	13,074	32.60%	63.36%	21,588	8,514	7,190	–	2,632	–	180	40,104
MB	Churchill	Lib	NDP	8,734	47.46%	3,445	18.72%	40.15%	3,773	5,289	8,734	–	606	–	–	18,402
MB	Dauphin—Swan River—Marquette	Con	Con	18,132	61.36%	13,218	44.73%	54.71%	18,132	4,128	4,914	–	1,923	–	452	29,549
MB	Elmwood—Transcona	NDP	NDP	14,355	45.77%	1,579	5.03%	54.04%	12,776	2,079	14,355	–	1,839	–	312	31,361
MB	Kildonan—St. Paul	Con	Con	19,751	53.40%	7,658	20.71%	58.48%	19,751	3,009	12,093	–	1,685	214	233	36,985
MB	Portage—Lisgar	Con	Con	22,036	68.27%	17,662	54.71%	53.77%	22,036	4,374	2,353	–	2,606	–	911	32,280
MB	Provencher	Con	Con	23,303	64.66%	18,356	50.93%	58.01%	23,303	4,531	4,947	–	2,089	–	1,170	36,040
MB	Saint Boniface	Lib	Con	19,440	46.32%	4,712	11.23%	64.32%	19,440	14,728	5,502	–	2,104	–	195	41,969
MB	Selkirk—Interlake	Con	Con	23,302	60.63%	13,796	35.90%	57.68%	23,302	3,203	9,506	–	2,126	–	295	38,432
MB	Winnipeg Centre	NDP	NDP	12,285	48.92%	6,848	27.27%	43.25%	5,437	3,922	12,285	–	2,777	361	331	25,113
MB	Winnipeg North	NDP	NDP	14,097	62.61%	9,064	40.26%	42.85%	5,033	2,075	14,097	–	1,070	–	241	22,516
MB	Winnipeg South	Con	Con	19,954	48.84%	5,733	14.03%	65.63%	19,954	14,221 (Note: John Loewen was previously a member of the Legislative Assembly of Manitoba)	4,673	–	1,839	–	173	40,860
MB	Winnipeg South Centre	Lib	Lib	16,438	42.27%	2,335	6.00%	65.68%	14,103	16,438	5,490	–	2,860	–	–	38,891
NB	Acadie—Bathurst	NDP	NDP	25,849	57.53%	15,999	35.61%	68.32%	8,331	9,850	25,849	–	904	–	–	44,934
NB	Beauséjour	Lib	Lib	20,059	46.76%	7,553	17.61%	69.25%	12,506	20,059	7,242	–	3,087	–	–	42,894
NB	Fredericton	Lib	Con	17,962	42.53%	4,643	10.99%	62.13%	17,962	13,319	6,490	–	4,293	–	168	42,232
NB	Fundy Royal	Con	Con	17,211	51.63%	9,304	27.91%	61.09%	17,211	5,773	7,907	–	2,443	–	–	33,334
NB	Madawaska—Restigouche	Lib	Lib	16,266	47.40%	4,864	14.17%	66.77%	11,402	16,266	5,361	–	1,287	–	–	34,316
NB	Miramichi	Lib	Con	12,058	42.08%	1,468	5.12%	65.78%	12,058	10,590	4,904	–	1,105	–	–	28,657
NB	Moncton—Riverview—Dieppe	Lib	Lib	17,797	39.13%	1,500	3.30%	61.31%	16,297	17,797	7,394	–	3,998	–	–	45,486
NB	New Brunswick Southwest	Con	Con	17,474	58.32%	11,611	38.75%	61.17%	17,474	5,863	4,958	–	1,667	–	–	29,962
NB	Saint John	Lib	Con	13,782	39.55%	497	1.43%	54.01%	13,782 (Note: Rodney Weston was previously a member of the Legislative Assembly of New Brunswick)	13,285	5,560	–	1,888	–	330	34,845
NB	Tobique—Mactaquac	Con	Con	18,071	57.40%	11,298	35.88%	59.73%	18,071	6,773	4,830	–	1,810	–	–	31,484
NL	Avalon	Con	Lib	14,866	45.28%	3,324	10.13%	51.80%	11,542	14,866	5,707	–	714	–	–	32,829
NL	Bonavista—Gander—Grand Falls—Windsor	Lib	Lib	20,089	70.27%	15,735	55.04%	41.15%	4,354	20,089	3,577	–	568	–	–	28,588
NL	Humber—St. Barbe—Baie Verte	Lib	Lib	17,956	68.22%	13,353	50.73%	44.25%	2,799	17,956	4,603	–	–	–	964	26,322
NL	Labrador	Lib	Lib	5,426	70.28%	4,048	52.43%	38.60%	615	5,426	1,378	–	302	–	–	7,721
NL	Random—Burin—St. George's	Lib	Lib	12,557	53.72%	6,994	29.92%	41.07%	4,791	12,557	5,563	–	462	–	–	23,373
NL	St. John's East	Con	NDP	30,881	74.55%	25,670	61.97%	56.89%	3,836	5,211	30,881	–	570	–	925	41,423
NL	St. John's South—Mount Pearl	Con	Lib	14,920	43.32%	949	2.76%	51.95%	4,324	14,920	13,971	–	643	179	402	34,439
NS	Cape Breton—Canso	Lib	Lib	17,447	48.10%	8,923	24.60%	63.31%	8,524	17,447	7,660	–	2,641	–	–	36,272
NS	Central Nova	Con	Con	18,240	46.60%	5,620	14.36%	67.01%	18,240	–	7,659	–	12,620	–	623	39,142
NS	Cumberland—Colchester—Musquodoboit Valley	Con	Ind	27,303	69.01%	22,429	56.69%	57.77%	3,493	3,344	4,874	–	–	27,853 (Note: Bill Casey, the winning candidate, was previously the Conservative MP)	–	39,564
NS	Dartmouth—Cole Harbour	Lib	Lib	16,016	39.49%	3,223	7.95%	58.73%	9,109	16,016	12,793	–	2,417	–	219	40,554
NS	Halifax	NDP	NDP	19,252	42.69%	6,794	15.06%	60.67%	9,295	12,458	19,252	–	3,931	–	162	45,098
NS	Halifax West	Lib	Lib	17,129	41.56%	4,928	11.96%	59.13%	8,708	17,129	12,201	–	2,920	–	257	41,215
NS	Kings—Hants	Lib	Lib	16,641	44.19%	6,795	18.04%	58.59%	9,846	16,641	8,291	–	2,353	–	528	37,659
NS	Sackville—Eastern Shore	NDP	NDP	24,279	61.42%	16,081	40.68%	58.52%	8,198	5,018	24,279	–	2,034	–	–	39,529
NS	South Shore—St. Margaret's	Con	Con	14,388	35.99%	932	2.33%	60.20%	14,388	9,536	13,456	–	2,090	–	513	39,983
NS	Sydney—Victoria	Lib	Lib	17,303	49.40%	8,744	24.96%	57.41%	7,223	17,303	8,559	–	1,941	–	–	35,026
NS	West Nova	Lib	Con	16,779	39.94%	1,594	3.79%	62.48%	16,779 (Note: Greg Kerr was previously a member of the Nova Scotia House of Assembly)	15,185	7,097	–	2,106	844	–	42,011
ON	Ajax—Pickering	Lib	Lib	21,675	44.53%	3,204	6.58%	56.71%	18,471	21,675	4,422	–	3,543	–	565	48,676
ON	Algoma—Manitoulin—Kapuskasing	Lib	NDP	15,249	45.50%	4,347	12.97%	56.53%	5,914	10,902	15,249	–	1,451	–	–	33,516
ON	Ancaster—Dundas—Flamborough—Westdale	Con	Con	26,297	46.50%	10,975	19.41%	66.70%	26,297	15,322	9,632	–	5,149	–	148	56,548
ON	Barrie	Con	Con	27,927	52.37%	15,195	28.49%	58.50%	27,927	12,732	6,403	–	5,921	–	344	53,327
ON	Beaches—East York	Lib	Lib	18,967	40.97%	4,092	8.84%	62.93%	7,907	18,967	14,875	–	4,389	–	155	46,293
ON	Bramalea—Gore—Malton	Lib	Lib	22,272	45.06%	3,919	7.93%	49.74%	18,353	22,272	5,945	–	2,551	–	309	49,430
ON	Brampton—Springdale	Lib	Lib	18,577	41.04%	773	1.71%	54.24%	17,804	18,577	5,238	–	3,516	–	135	45,270
ON	Brampton West (Note: also an open seat)	Lib	Lib	21,746	40.33%	231	0.43%	49.72%	21,515	21,746	7,334	–	3,329	–	–	53,924
ON	Brant	Lib	Con	22,736	41.95%	4,793	8.84%	58.38%	22,736	17,943	9,331	–	3,814	–	371	54,195
ON	Bruce—Grey—Owen Sound	Con	Con	22,975	47.66%	9,880	20.50%	61.36%	22,975	6,892	4,640	–	13,095	–	599	48,201
ON	Burlington	Con	Con	28,614	48.60%	9,037	15.35%	64.99%	28,614	19,577	6,597	–	4,083	–	–	58,871
ON	Cambridge	Con	Con	24,895	48.63%	12,918	25.23%	55.92%	24,895	11,977	10,044	–	4,279	–	–	51,195
ON	Carleton—Mississippi Mills	Con	Con	39,433	57.77%	24,179	35.43%	69.16%	39,433	15,254	6,583	–	6,983	–	–	68,253
ON	Chatham-Kent—Essex	Con	Con	19,960	47.92%	7,833	18.81%	55.86%	19,960	12,127	6,850	–	2,712	–	–	41,649
ON	Davenport	Lib	Lib	15,953	45.77%	5,057	14.51%	53.03%	3,838	15,953	10,896	–	3,655	172	339	34,853
ON	Don Valley East	Lib	Lib	18,264	48.08%	6,487	17.08%	53.48%	11,777	18,264	5,062	–	2,618	–	266	37,987
ON	Don Valley West	Lib	Lib	22,212	44.36%	2,771	5.53%	62.12%	19,441	22,212	5,102	–	3,155	–	162	50,072
ON	Dufferin—Caledon	Con	Con	23,363	53.21%	14,868	33.86%	56.79%	23,363	8,495	4,385	–	7,377	–	284	43,904
ON	Durham	Con	Con	28,551	54.05%	16,384	31.02%	60.48%	28,551	12,167	5,485	–	6,041	–	577	52,821
ON	Eglinton—Lawrence	Lib	Lib	19,133	43.99%	2,060	4.74%	59.75%	17,073	19,133	3,663	–	3,629	–	–	43,498
ON	Elgin—Middlesex—London	Con	Con	22,970	48.39%	11,801	24.86%	59.66%	22,970	11,169	9,135	–	3,241	243	715	47,473
ON	Essex	Con	Con	20,608	40.00%	5,635	10.94%	58.22%	20,608	14,973	13,703	–	2,234	–	–	51,518
ON	Etobicoke Centre	Lib	Lib	24,537	48.85%	5,698	11.34%	62.48%	18,839	24,537	4,164	–	2,688	–	–	50,228
ON	Etobicoke—Lakeshore	Lib	Lib	23,536	46.13%	5,743	11.26%	59.31%	17,793	23,536	5,950	–	3,562	–	181	51,022
ON	Etobicoke North	Lib	Lib	15,244	48.58%	5,808	18.51%	49.60%	9,436	15,244	4,940	–	1,460	–	300	31,380
ON	Glengarry—Prescott—Russell	Con	Con	25,659	47.30%	5,662	10.44%	67.29%	25,659	19,997	5,678	–	2,908	–	–	54,242
ON	Guelph	Lib	Lib	18,974	32.22%	1,788	3.04%	64.59%	17,186	18,974	9,713	–	12,454	58	504	58,889
ON	Haldimand—Norfolk	Con	Con	19,657	40.83%	4,080	8.47%	60.98%	19,657	15,577	5,549	–	2,041	4,821	501	48,146
ON	Haliburton—Kawartha Lakes—Brock	Con	Con	30,391	55.95%	19,298	35.53%	60.10%	30,391	11,093	7,952	–	4,505	–	374	54,315
ON	Halton	Con	Con	32,986	47.50%	7,850	11.30%	60.45%	32,986	25,136	6,118	–	4,872	–	337	69,449
ON	Hamilton Centre	NDP	NDP	20,010	49.25%	10,959	26.97%	50.36%	9,051	7,164	20,010	–	3,625	–	779	40,629
ON	Hamilton East—Stoney Creek	NDP	NDP	19,919	41.28%	6,464	13.40%	56.59%	11,556	13,455	19,919	–	2,142	323	853	48,248
ON	Hamilton Mountain	NDP	NDP	22,796	43.65%	6,786	12.99%	59.26%	16,010	10,531	22,796	–	2,884	–	–	52,221
ON	Huron—Bruce	Lib	Con	22,182	44.77%	5,846	11.80%	64.59%	22,182	16,336	7,426	–	2,617	242	747	49,550
ON	Kenora	Lib	Con	9,395	40.46%	2,051	8.83%	54.48%	9,395	7,344	5,394	–	1,087	–	–	23,220
ON	Kingston and the Islands	Lib	Lib	22,734	39.15%	3,839	6.61%	60.10%	18,895	22,734	10,158	–	6,282	–	–	58,069
ON	Kitchener Centre	Lib	Con	16,480	36.70%	339	0.75%	57.03%	16,480	16,141	8,122	–	3,823	215	127	44,908
ON	Kitchener—Conestoga	Con	Con	23,525	49.32%	11,649	24.42%	56.52%	23,525	11,876	7,173	–	5,124	–	–	47,698
ON	Kitchener—Waterloo	Lib	Con	21,830	36.06%	17	0.03%	62.31%	21,830	21,813	8,915	–	7,326	107	543	60,534
ON	Lambton—Kent—Middlesex	Con	Con	24,516	51.28%	12,704	26.58%	61.10%	24,516	11,812	7,427	–	3,386	–	663	47,804
ON	Lanark—Frontenac—Lennox and Addington	Con	Con	30,272	55.88%	18,463	34.08%	61.04%	30,272	11,809	7,112	–	4,629	–	347	54,169
ON	Leeds—Grenville	Con	Con	27,473	58.44%	19,398	41.27%	62.86%	27,473	8,075	6,511	–	4,522	–	426	47,007
ON	London—Fanshawe	NDP	NDP	17,672	43.06%	5,013	12.22%	55.11%	12,659	7,774	17,672	–	2,656	–	276	41,037
ON	London North Centre	Lib	Lib	21,018	39.13%	3,306	6.15%	56.97%	17,712	21,018	9,387	–	5,603	–	–	53,720
ON	London West	Lib	Con	22,556	39.09%	2,121	3.68%	63.14%	22,556	20,435	8,409	–	5,630	–	667	57,697
ON	Markham—Unionville	Lib	Lib	25,296	55.02%	11,441	24.88%	52.01%	13,855	25,296	4,682	–	1,921	–	225	45,979
ON	Mississauga—Brampton South	Lib	Lib	21,220	47.69%	6,556	14.73%	49.39%	14,664	21,220	5,268	–	2,947	–	395	44,494
ON	Mississauga East—Cooksville	Lib	Lib	20,457	50.16%	7,180	17.61%	49.13%	13,277	20,457	4,632	–	2,138	–	277	40,781
ON	Mississauga—Erindale	Lib	Con	23,863	42.71%	397	0.71%	56.20%	23,863	23,466	4,774	–	3,636	–	129	55,868
ON	Mississauga South	Lib	Lib	20,518	44.22%	2,152	4.64%	60.08%	18,366	20,518	4,104	–	3,407	–	–	46,395
ON	Mississauga—Streetsville	Lib	Lib	21,710	45.76%	4,725	9.96%	56.13%	16,985	21,710	4,710	–	3,179	857	–	47,441
ON	Nepean—Carleton	Con	Con	39,921	55.84%	23,178	32.42%	69.39%	39,921	16,743	6,946	–	7,880	–	–	71,490
ON	Newmarket—Aurora	Lib	Con	24,873	46.70%	6,623	12.43%	62.07%	24,873	18,250	4,548	–	4,381	–	1,209	53,261
ON	Niagara Falls	Con	Con	24,016	46.70%	10,149	19.74%	54.60%	24,016	13,867	9,186	–	4,356	–	–	51,425
ON	Niagara West—Glanbrook	Con	Con	28,089	51.98%	15,134	28.01%	63.69%	28,089	12,955	7,980	–	3,897	–	1,118	54,039
ON	Nickel Belt	Lib	NDP	19,021	46.54%	8,273	20.24%	57.75%	8,869	10,748	19,021	–	2,056	112	66	40,872
ON	Nipissing—Timiskaming	Lib	Lib	18,510	44.56%	5,078	12.23%	59.42%	13,432	18,510	6,582	–	2,808	–	204	41,536
ON	Northumberland—Quinte West	Con	Con	27,615	48.71%	11,406	20.12%	60.75%	27,615	16,209	8,230	–	4,633	–	–	56,687
ON	Oak Ridges—Markham	Lib	Con	32,028	42.24%	545	0.72%	55.66%	32,028	31,483	7,126	–	5,184	–	–	75,821
ON	Oakville	Lib	Con	26,011	46.98%	5,483	9.90%	66.34%	26,011	20,528	4,143	–	4,681	–	–	55,363
ON	Oshawa	Con	Con	19,951	41.37%	3,201	6.64%	55.25%	19,951	7,741	16,750	–	3,374	–	415	48,231
ON	Ottawa Centre	NDP	NDP	25,399	39.74%	8,766	13.71%	69.11%	15,065	16,633	25,399	–	6,348	–	473	63,918
ON	Ottawa—Orléans	Con	Con	27,244	44.91%	3,695	6.09%	71.34%	27,244	23,549	6,025	–	3,845	–	–	60,663
ON	Ottawa South	Lib	Lib	29,035	49.91%	9,618	16.53%	66.82%	19,417	29,035	4,920	–	3,939	–	864	58,175
ON	Ottawa—Vanier	Lib	Lib	23,948	46.20%	9,810	18.93%	64.04%	14,138	23,948	8,845	–	4,447	227	230	51,835
ON	Ottawa West—Nepean	Con	Con	25,109	44.98%	4,948	8.86%	66.44%	25,109	20,161	6,432	–	3,558	414	150	55,824
ON	Oxford	Con	Con	23,330	52.68%	14,744	33.29%	59.02%	23,330	8,586	7,982	–	3,355	–	1,036	44,289
ON	Parkdale—High Park	NDP	Lib	20,705	42.98%	3,373	7.00%	64.60%	5,992	20,705	17,332	–	3,601	–	549	48,179
ON	Parry Sound-Muskoka	Con	Con	21,831	50.19%	10,960	25.19%	62.71%	21,831	10,871	5,355	–	5,119	325	–	43,501
ON	Perth Wellington	Con	Con	20,765	48.09%	10,540	24.41%	59.39%	20,765	10,225	7,334	–	3,874	–	982	43,180
ON	Peterborough	Con	Con	27,630	47.40%	9,213	15.81%	63.32%	27,630	18,417	8,115	–	4,029	–	98	58,289
ON	Pickering—Scarborough East	Lib	Lib	22,874	49.69%	7,934	17.24%	60.22%	14,940	22,874	4,875	–	3,023	–	321	46,033
ON	Prince Edward—Hastings	Con	Con	26,061	50.19%	12,013	23.14%	59.06%	26,061	14,048	7,156	–	4,379	276	–	51,920
ON	Renfrew—Nipissing—Pembroke	Con	Con	28,908	61.10%	19,171	40.52%	63.15%	28,908	9,737	5,175	–	3,201	293	–	47,314
ON	Richmond Hill	Lib	Lib	21,488	47.00%	5,170	11.31%	52.05%	16,318	21,488	4,526	–	3,388	–	–	45,720
ON	St. Catharines	Con	Con	23,474	45.90%	8,822	17.25%	61.20%	23,474	14,652	9,428	–	3,477	–	113	51,144
ON	St. Paul's	Lib	Lib	26,286	50.61%	12,338	23.76%	63.98%	13,948	26,286	6,666	–	4,726	–	312	51,938
ON	Sarnia—Lambton	Con	Con	23,195	50.01%	13,158	28.37%	58.66%	23,195	9,404	10,037	–	3,201	–	545	46,382
ON	Sault Ste. Marie	NDP	NDP	16,572	40.43%	1,111	2.71%	59.42%	15,461	6,870	16,572	–	1,774	–	316	40,993
ON	Scarborough—Agincourt	Lib	Lib	22,795	56.63%	10,959	27.23%	54.16%	11,836	22,795	3,748	–	1,870	–	–	40,249
ON	Scarborough Centre	Lib	Lib	17,927	48.68%	6,839	18.57%	52.13%	11,088	17,927	5,801	–	2,011	–	–	36,827
ON	Scarborough-Guildwood	Lib	Lib	18,098	50.17%	7,217	20.01%	54.02%	10,881	18,098	5,183	–	1,913	–	–	36,075
ON	Scarborough—Rouge River	Lib	Lib	23,718	58.78%	14,558	36.08%	47.50%	9,160	23,718	5,936	–	1,207	–	331	40,352
ON	Scarborough Southwest	Lib	Lib	15,486	41.83%	4,558	12.31%	54.74%	10,928	15,486	6,943	–	3,514	151	–	37,022
ON	Simcoe—Grey	Con	Con	30,897	55.05%	18,798	33.49%	60.10%	30,897	12,099	6,288	–	5,685	–	1,161	56,130
ON	Simcoe North	Con	Con	26,328	49.66%	11,658	21.99%	60.10%	26,328	14,670	6,202	–	5,821	–	–	53,021
ON	Stormont—Dundas—South Glengarry	Con	Con	25,846	57.34%	17,292	38.36%	60.15%	25,846	8,554	6,107	–	1,880	2,581	105	45,073
ON	Sudbury	Lib	NDP	15,094	35.15%	2,125	4.95%	58.11%	11,073	12,969	15,094	–	3,330	80	397	42,943
ON	Thornhill	Lib	Con	26,660	49.01%	5,212	9.58%	56.80%	26,660	21,448	3,601	–	2,686	–	–	54,395
ON	Thunder Bay—Rainy River	Lib	NDP	14,478	40.32%	2,889	8.05%	57.05%	8,466	11,589	14,478	–	1,377	–	–	35,910
ON	Thunder Bay—Superior North	Lib	NDP	13,187	37.03%	3,104	8.72%	57.37%	9,556	10,083	13,187	–	2,463	–	327	35,616
ON	Timmins-James Bay	NDP	NDP	17,188	56.54%	10,448	34.37%	51.00%	5,536	6,740	17,188	–	938	–	–	30,402
ON	Toronto Centre	Lib	Lib	27,462	53.53%	18,060	35.20%	57.39%	9,402	27,462	7,743	–	6,081	146	472	51,306
ON	Toronto—Danforth	NDP	NDP	20,323	44.78%	6,987	15.39%	60.91%	5,287	13,336	20,323	–	5,995	130	316	45,387
ON	Trinity—Spadina	NDP	NDP	24,454	40.84%	3,484	5.82%	62.21%	8,249	20,970	24,454	–	5,418	296	491	59,878
ON	Vaughan	Lib	Lib	27,773	49.18%	8,383	14.84%	51.92%	19,390	27,773	5,442	–	3,870	–	–	56,475
ON	Welland	Lib	NDP	16,842	32.91%	300	0.59%	59.67%	16,542	14,295	16,842	–	2,816	569	114	51,178
ON	Wellington—Halton Hills	Con	Con	29,191	57.63%	17,879	35.30%	63.21%	29,191	11,312	4,747	–	4,987	–	414	50,651
ON	Whitby—Oshawa	Con	Con	30,704	50.99%	15,244	25.32%	60.91%	30,704	15,460	8,584	–	5,067	–	395	60,210
ON	Willowdale	Lib	Lib	23,889	48.67%	7,958	16.21%	51.92%	15,931	23,889	5,011	–	3,130	260	864	49,085
ON	Windsor—Tecumseh	NDP	NDP	20,914	48.70%	10,638	24.77%	50.65%	10,276	9,005	20,914	–	2,749	–	–	42,944
ON	Windsor West	NDP	NDP	20,791	52.51%	11,837	29.89%	47.33%	8,954	7,357	20,791	–	2,253	–	241	39,596
ON	York Centre	Lib	Lib	16,164	43.46%	2,032	5.46%	52.31%	14,132	16,164	4,503	–	2,390	–	–	37,189
ON	York—Simcoe	Con	Con	27,412	56.70%	18,368	37.99%	56.17%	27,412	9,044	5,882	–	4,887	–	1,120	48,345
ON	York South—Weston	Lib	Lib	16,071	46.60%	6,430	18.64%	50.35%	7,021	16,071	9,641	–	1,757	–	–	34,490
ON	York West	Lib	Lib	16,997	59.39%	11,634	40.65%	48.33%	4,773	16,997	5,363	–	1,488	–	–	28,621
PE	Cardigan	Lib	Lib	10,105	52.81%	4,444	23.23%	70.26%	5,661	10,105	1,556	–	710	1,101	–	19,133
PE	Charlottetown	Lib	Lib	8,893	50.06%	3,189	17.95%	66.10%	5,704	8,893	2,187	–	858	–	124	17,766
PE	Egmont (Note: also an open seat)	Lib	Con	8,110	43.93%	55	0.30%	68.15%	8,110 (Note: Gail Shea was previously a member of the Legislative Assembly of Prince Edward Island.)	8,055 (Note: Keith Milligan was previously a member of the Legislative Assembly of Prince Edward Island, as well as Premier of Prince Edward Island for a short time in 1996.)	1,670	–	626	–	–	18,461
PE	Malpeque	Lib	Lib	8,312	44.19%	924	4.91%	71.41%	7,388	8,312	1,819	–	1,291	–	–	18,810
QC	Abitibi—Baie-James—Nunavik—Eeyou	BQ	BQ	10,995	39.65%	2,573	9.28%	49.06%	8,422	5,108	2,276	10,995	928	–	–	27,729
QC	Abitibi—Témiscamingue	BQ	BQ	20,929	47.91%	11,874	27.18%	55.01%	8,267	9,055	4,151	20,929	976	302	–	43,680
QC	Ahuntsic	BQ	BQ	18,815	39.49%	423	0.89%	65.64%	4,937	18,392	4,276	18,815	1,228	–	–	47,648
QC	Alfred-Pellan	BQ	BQ	20,686	38.83%	5,092	9.56%	66.05%	8,662	15,594	6,406	20,686	1,665	259	–	53,272
QC	Argenteuil—Papineau—Mirabel	BQ	BQ	26,455	48.10%	16,471	29.95%	60.86%	9,584	9,984	6,819	26,455	2,055	–	98	54,995
QC	Bas-Richelieu—Nicolet—Bécancour	BQ	BQ	26,821	54.67%	17,917	36.52%	65.45%	8,904	7,987	4,010	26,821	1,334	–	–	49,056
QC	Beauce	Con	Con	31,883	62.41%	24,740	48.43%	62.38%	31,883	5,270	4,352	7,143	2,436	–	–	51,084
QC	Beauharnois—Salaberry	BQ	BQ	26,904	50.07%	16,046	29.86%	63.22%	10,858	7,995	6,214	26,904	1,764	–	–	53,735
QC	Beauport—Limoilou	Con	Con	17,994	36.76%	2,032	4.15%	59.40%	17,994	7,030	5,986	15,962	1,363	610	–	48,945
QC	Berthier—Maskinongé	BQ	BQ	24,945	45.83%	12,867	23.64%	62.75%	12,078	10,035	5,684	24,945	1,691	–	–	54,433
QC	Bourassa	Lib	Lib	19,869	49.79%	9,724	24.37%	58.32%	5,405	19,869	3,188	10,145	1,166	–	130	39,903
QC	Brome—Missisquoi	BQ	BQ	17,561	35.21%	1,204	2.41%	65.78%	9,309	16,357	4,514	17,561	1,784	354	–	49,879
QC	Brossard—La Prairie	BQ	Lib	19,103	32.59%	69	0.12%	64.57%	11,062	19,103	7,452	19,034	1,816	–	157	58,624
QC	Chambly—Borduas	BQ	BQ	31,773	50.08%	21,124	33.30%	68.41%	9,564	10,649	8,998	31,773	2,460	–	–	63,444
QC	Charlesbourg—Haute-Saint-Charles	Con	Con	20,566	41.15%	5,964	11.93%	63.66%	20,566	7,039	6,542	14,602	1,231	–	–	49,980
QC	Châteauguay—Saint-Constant	BQ	BQ	25,086	45.58%	14,982	27.22%	66.36%	9,827	10,104	8,261	25,086	1,755	–	–	55,033
QC	Chicoutimi—Le Fjord	BQ	BQ	19,737	41.31%	3,057	6.40%	62.25%	16,680	6,425	3,742	19,737	1,193	–	–	47,777
QC	Compton—Stanstead	BQ	BQ	20,332	41.86%	9,386	19.32%	62.97%	9,445	10,946	5,483	20,332	2,368	–	–	48,574
QC	Drummond	BQ	BQ	17,613	38.79%	6,123	13.49%	62.21%	11,490	7,697	7,460	17,613	1,144	–	–	45,404
QC	Gaspésie—Îles-de-la-Madeleine	BQ	BQ	14,636	40.10%	4,796	13.14%	54.11%	8,334	9,840	2,549	14,636	1,136	–	–	36,495
QC	Gatineau	BQ	BQ	15,189	29.15%	1,577	3.03%	61.13%	8,762	13,193	13,612	15,189	1,342	–	–	52,098
QC	Haute-Gaspésie—La Mitis—Matane—Matapédia	BQ	BQ	11,984	37.53%	616	1.93%	54.38%	5,771	11,368 (Note: Nancy Charest was previously a member of the National Assembly of Quebec.)	1,497	11,984	1,139	175	–	31,934
QC	Hochelaga	BQ	BQ	22,720	49.73%	13,278	29.07%	58.24%	4,201	9,442	6,600	22,720	1,946	–	774	45,683
QC	Honoré-Mercier	Lib	Lib	21,544	43.67%	7,673	15.55%	62.16%	7,549	21,544	4,986	13,871	1,380	–	–	49,330
QC	Hull—Aylmer	Lib	Lib	19,750	37.45%	8,125	15.41%	61.00%	7,996	19,750	10,454	11,625	2,784	–	121	52,730
QC	Jeanne-Le Ber	BQ	BQ	17,144	34.91%	1,303	2.65%	57.66%	5,494	15,841	7,708	17,144	2,345	577	–	49,109
QC	Joliette	BQ	BQ	28,040	52.40%	18,500	34.57%	62.02%	9,540	7,769	5,579	28,040	2,588	–	–	53,516
QC	Jonquière—Alma	Con	Con	26,639	52.48%	7,604	14.98%	64.79%	26,639	2,616	2,475	19,035	–	–	–	50,765
QC	La Pointe-de-l'Île	BQ	BQ	25,976	56.09%	18,573	40.10%	59.46%	5,179	7,403	5,975	25,976	1,340	–	438	46,311
QC	Lac-Saint-Louis	Lib	Lib	23,842	46.39%	11,757	22.87%	64.03%	12,085	23,842	8,105	2,953	4,415	–	–	51,400
QC	LaSalle—Émard	Lib	Lib	17,226	40.60%	6,842	16.13%	57.82%	6,802	17,226	5,622	10,384	1,579	674	144	42,431
QC	Laurentides—Labelle	BQ	BQ	24,956	47.08%	10,813	20.40%	60.40%	6,914	14,143	4,896	24,956	2,094	–	–	53,003
QC	Laurier—Sainte-Marie	BQ	BQ	24,103	50.24%	15,305	31.90%	61.10%	2,320	8,798	8,209	24,103	3,801	93	651	47,975
QC	Laval	BQ	BQ	19,085	37.80%	4,895	9.69%	62.24%	9,101	14,190	6,289	19,085	1,607	–	221	50,493
QC	Laval—Les Îles	Lib	Lib	21,603	40.45%	9,027	16.90%	61.69%	11,017	21,603	6,124	12,576	1,752	–	336	53,408
QC	Lévis—Bellechasse	Con	Con	24,785	45.90%	11,038	20.44%	62.45%	24,785	8,130	5,856	13,747	1,370	–	113	54,001
QC	Longueuil—Pierre-Boucher	BQ	BQ	23,118	46.12%	12,198	24.34%	65.89%	7,210	10,920	7,021	23,118	1,752	–	103	50,124
QC	Lotbinière—Chutes-de-la-Chaudière	Con	Con	24,495	47.27%	11,757	22.69%	66.15%	24,495	6,498	6,828	12,738	1,265	–	–	51,824
QC	Louis-Hébert	Con	BQ	20,992	36.23%	4,649	8.02%	70.29%	16,343	13,669	5,403	20,992	1,408	–	119	57,934
QC	Louis-Saint-Laurent	Con	Con	23,683	47.14%	10,353	20.61%	62.88%	23,683	6,712	5,252	13,330	1,260	–	–	50,237
QC	Manicouagan	BQ	BQ	15,272	49.29%	6,898	22.26%	49.20%	8,374	4,737	1,491	15,272	1,112	–	–	30,986
QC	Marc-Aurèle-Fortin	BQ	BQ	25,552	45.53%	11,824	21.07%	67.41%	7,759	13,728	6,907	25,552	2,178	–	–	56,124
QC	Mégantic—L'Érable	Con	Con	20,697	46.70%	8,414	18.99%	64.42%	20,697	6,185	4,191	12,283	959	–	–	44,315
QC	Montcalm	BQ	BQ	33,519	55.69%	25,132	41.75%	61.73%	8,096	8,387	8,337	33,519	1,854	–	–	60,193
QC	Montmagny—L'Islet—Kamouraska—Rivière-du-Loup	BQ	BQ	20,494	46.03%	6,854	15.39%	57.49%	13,640	6,835	2,428	20,494	978	–	147	44,522
QC	Montmorency—Charlevoix—Haute-Côte-Nord	BQ	BQ	21,068	48.88%	9,279	21.53%	58.35%	11,789	5,769	3,332	21,068	1,147	–	–	43,105
QC	Mount Royal	Lib	Lib	19,702	55.65%	10,026	28.32%	52.30%	9,676	19,702	2,733	1,543	1,565	–	186	35,405
QC	Notre-Dame-de-Grâce—Lachine	Lib	Lib	19,554	44.62%	12,446	28.40%	58.09%	7,108	19,554	6,641	6,962	3,378	–	177	43,820
QC	Outremont	Lib	NDP	14,348	39.53%	2,343	6.46%	56.61%	3,820	12,005	14,348	4,554	1,566	–	–	36,293
QC	Papineau	BQ	Lib	17,724	41.47%	1,189	2.78%	61.77%	3,262	17,724	3,734	16,535	1,213	267	–	42,735
QC	Pierrefonds—Dollard	Lib	Lib	21,468	46.94%	9,653	21.11%	57.81%	11,815	21,468	4,823	4,357	3,161	–	111	45,735
QC	Pontiac	Con	Con	14,023	32.71%	3,627	8.46%	54.55%	14,023	10,396	6,616	9,576	2,148	–	112	42,871
QC	Portneuf—Jacques-Cartier	Ind	Ind	15,063	33.49%	662	1.47%	60.83%	–	7,320	5,707	14,401	1,452	16,102 (Note: André Arthur, the winning candidate, was the incumbent MP)	–	44,982
QC	Québec	BQ	BQ	21,064	41.76%	8,121	16.10%	62.68%	12,943	8,845	5,933	21,064	1,650	–	–	50,435
QC	Repentigny	BQ	BQ	31,007	53.05%	22,154	37.91%	65.90%	8,168	8,751	8,853	31,007	1,666	–	–	58,445
QC	Richmond—Arthabaska	BQ	BQ	23,913	46.02%	8,833	17.00%	65.57%	15,080	6,599	4,509	23,913	1,337	526	–	51,964
QC	Rimouski-Neigette—Témiscouata—Les Basques	BQ	BQ	17,652	44.69%	9,715	24.59%	58.73%	7,216	7,937	4,084	17,652	645	1,966	–	39,500
QC	Rivière-des-Mille-Îles	BQ	BQ	23,216	45.68%	13,305	26.18%	67.18%	9,911	8,823	6,741	23,216	2,134	–	–	50,825
QC	Rivière-du-Nord	BQ	BQ	26,588	53.57%	19,401	39.09%	59.26%	7,170	6,755	7,187	26,588	1,656	273	–	49,629
QC	Roberval—Lac-Saint-Jean	BQ	Con	16,055	43.54%	1,436	3.89%	58.99%	16,055	3,721	1,738	14,619	737	–	–	36,870
QC	Rosemont—La Petite-Patrie	BQ	BQ	27,260	52.00%	17,475	33.34%	64.65%	3,876	9,785	8,522	27,260	2,406	83	489	52,421
QC	Saint-Bruno—Saint-Hubert	BQ	BQ	23,767	44.99%	12,012	22.74%	67.70%	8,125	11,755	7,154	23,767	2,031	–	–	52,832
QC	Saint-Hyacinthe—Bagot	BQ	BQ	22,719	47.36%	12,524	26.11%	63.12%	10,195	6,649	6,721	22,719	1,682	–	–	47,966
QC	Saint-Jean	BQ	BQ	26,506	49.61%	17,076	31.96%	65.47%	9,281	9,430	5,529	26,506	2,160	520	–	53,426
QC	Saint-Lambert	BQ	BQ	16,346	37.63%	3,963	9.12%	59.45%	6,867	12,383	6,280	16,346	1,566	–	–	43,442
QC	Saint-Laurent—Cartierville	Lib	Lib	25,095	61.72%	18,096	44.51%	53.55%	6,999	25,095	3,654	4,611	–	–	299	40,658
QC	Saint-Léonard—Saint-Michel	Lib	Lib	21,652	57.26%	16,025	42.38%	53.59%	5,627	21,652	4,039	5,146	1,063	122	165	37,814
QC	Saint-Maurice—Champlain	BQ	BQ	20,397	43.96%	9,314	20.07%	59.25%	11,083	9,755	3,601	20,397	1,562	–	–	46,398
QC	Shefford	BQ	BQ	21,650	42.82%	10,840	21.44%	63.14%	9,927	10,810	6,323	21,650	1,848	–	–	50,558
QC	Sherbrooke	BQ	BQ	25,502	50.08%	15,555	30.55%	62.85%	8,331	9,947	6,676	25,502	–	–	467	50,923
QC	Terrebonne—Blainville	BQ	BQ	28,303	52.35%	19,366	35.82%	66.00%	7,551	8,937	7,278	28,303	1,714	283	–	54,066
QC	Trois-Rivières	BQ	BQ	22,405	45.27%	10,407	21.03%	64.58%	11,998	9,008	4,544	22,405	1,540	–	–	49,495
QC	Vaudreuil-Soulanges	BQ	BQ	27,044	41.34%	11,548	17.65%	67.76%	15,496	13,954	6,298	27,044	2,625	–	–	65,417
QC	Verchères—Les Patriotes	BQ	BQ	27,602	50.85%	18,731	34.51%	71.87%	7,742	8,871	8,388	27,602	1,679	–	–	54,282
QC	Westmount—Ville-Marie	Lib	Lib	18,041	46.47%	9,137	23.53%	50.65%	6,139	18,041	8,904	2,818	2,733	47	145	38,827
SK	Battlefords—Lloydminster	Con	Con	15,621	60.11%	9,049	34.82%	51.11%	15,621	2,140	6,572	–	1,287	–	368	25,988
SK	Blackstrap	Con	Con	20,747	53.95%	10,871	28.27%	64.57%	20,747	5,509	9,876	–	2,325	–	–	38,457
SK	Cypress Hills—Grasslands	Con	Con	17,922	64.36%	13,528	48.58%	62.79%	17,922	3,691	4,394	–	1,840	–	–	27,847
SK	Desnethé—Missinippi—Churchill River	Lib	Con	8,964	46.67%	3,148	16.39%	44.75%	8,964	5,816	3,414	–	733	–	282	19,209
SK	Palliser	Con	Con	14,159	44.12%	3,294	10.26%	64.35%	14,159	5,489	10,865	–	1,580	–	–	32,093
SK	Prince Albert	Con	Con	16,542	57.73%	8,299	28.96%	55.52%	16,542	2,289	8,243	–	1,413	–	167	28,654
SK	Regina—Lumsden—Lake Centre	Con	Con	16,053	51.09%	7,090	22.56%	63.09%	16,053	4,668	8,963	–	1,737	–	–	31,421
SK	Regina—Qu'Appelle	Con	Con	14,068	51.85%	5,369	19.79%	56.61%	14,068	2,809	8,699	–	1,556	–	–	27,132
SK	Saskatoon—Humboldt	Con	Con	18,610	53.80%	8,978	25.96%	61.50%	18,610	4,135	9,632	–	2,211	–	–	34,588
SK	Saskatoon—Rosetown—Biggar	Con	Con	12,231	45.39%	262	0.97%	54.82%	12,231	1,188	11,969	–	1,232	138	188	26,946
SK	Saskatoon—Wanuskewin	Con	Con	18,320	56.51%	10,422	32.15%	58.78%	18,320	4,020	7,898	–	2,182	–	–	32,420
SK	Souris—Moose Mountain	Con	Con	19,293	70.49%	14,694	53.69%	58.68%	19,293	1,834	4,599	–	1,643	–	–	27,369
SK	Wascana	Lib	Lib	17,028	46.08%	4,230	11.45%	64.20%	12,798	17,028	5,418	–	1,706	–	–	36,950
SK	Yorkton—Melville	Con	Con	19,824	68.03%	13,748	47.18%	56.86%	19,824	1,578	6,076	–	1,664	–	–	29,142
Terr	Nunavut	Lib	Con	2,815	34.92%	466	5.78%	47.35%	2,815	2,349	2,228	–	669	–	–	8,061
Terr	Western Arctic	NDP	NDP	5,669	41.45%	523	3.82%	47.71%	5,146 (Note: Brendan Bell was previously a member of the Northwest Territories Legislature)	1,858	5,669	–	752	–	252	13,677
Terr	Yukon	Lib	Lib	6,715	45.80%	1,927	13.14%	63.23%	4,788	6,715	1,276	–	1,881	–	–	14,660

= went to a judicial recount
= Open seat
= turnout is above national average
= Incumbent had switched allegiance
= Previously incumbent in another riding
= Not incumbent; was previously elected to the House
= Incumbency arose from by-election gain
= other incumbents defeated
= Multiple candidates

=== Summary analysis ===
Ternary plots - shift of electoral support (2006-2008)
2006

2008
Electoral districts identified by colours of winning parties

Party candidates in 2nd place
Party in 1st place	Party in 2nd place						Total
Party in 1st place	Con	Lib	NDP	BQ	Grn	Ind	Total
Conservative		78	50	9	5	1	143
Liberal	57		13	7			77
New Democratic	20	17					37
Bloc Québécois	18	28	3				49
Independent			1	1			2
Total	95	123	67	17	5	1	308

Candidates ranked 1st to 5th place, by party
Parties	1st	2nd	3rd	4th	5th
█ Conservative	143	95	56	12	1
█ Liberal	77	123	79	28	
█ Bloc Québécois	49	17	5	2	2
█ New Democratic	37	67	129	75	
█ Independent	2	1	1	3	26
█ Green		5	38	185	74
█ Christian Heritage				1	47
█ Progressive Canadian				1	8
█ Newfoundland and Labrador First				1	1
█ Libertarian					19
█ Marxist–Leninist					16
█ Communist					10
█ Canadian Action					7
█ Marijuana					6
█ First Peoples National					4
█ Animal Alliance					1
█ neorhino.ca					1
█ Work Less					1

Resulting composition of the 40th Canadian Parliament
Source		Party					
Source		Con	Lib	NDP	Bloc	Ind	Total
Seats retained	Incumbents returned	105	66	24	42	1	238
Seats retained	Open seats held	12	7	2	5		26
Seats retained	Ouster of incumbent changing allegiance	1	1		1		3
Seats changing hands	Incumbents defeated	17	3	6	1		27
Seats changing hands	Open seats gained	6		4			10
Seats changing hands	Byelection gains held	2		1			3
Seats changing hands	Incumbent changing allegiance					1	1
Total		143	77	37	49	2	308

=== Significant results among independent and minor party candidates ===
Those candidates not belonging to a major party, receiving more than 1,000 votes in the election, are listed below:

Riding	Party	Candidates	Votes	Placed
Calgary Northeast	█ Independent	Rogere Richard	4,836	3rd
Calgary West	█ Independent	Kirk Schmidt	1,790	5th
Cardigan	█ Independent	Larry McGuire	1,101	4th
Cumberland—Colchester—Musquodoboit Valley	█ Independent	Bill Casey	27,303	1st
Edmonton—Sherwood Park	█ Independent	James Ford	15,960	2nd
Haldimand—Norfolk	█ Independent	Gary McHale	4,821	4th
Lethbridge	█ Christian Her.	Geoffrey Capp	1,094	5th
Newmarket—Aurora	█ Progressive Cdn	Dorian Baxter	1,004	5th
Niagara West—Glanbrook	█ Christian Her.	Dave Bylsma	1,118	5th
Oxford	█ Christian Her.	Shaun MacDonald	1,036	5th
Portneuf—Jacques-Cartier	█ Independent	André Arthur	15,063	1st
Portneuf—Jacques-Cartier	█ Independent	Jean Paradis	1,039	6th
Provencher	█ Christian Her.	David Reimer	1,170	5th
Rimouski-Neigette—Témiscouata—Les Basques	█ Independent	Louise Thibault	1,966	5th
Simcoe—Grey	█ Christian Her.	Peter Van der Zaag	1,018	5th
Skeena—Bulkley Valley	█ Christian Her.	Rod Taylor	1,125	5th
Stormont—Dundas—South Glengarry	█ Independent	Howard Galganov	2,581	4th

=== Results by province ===
Party name		BC	AB	SK	MB	ON	QC	NB	NS	PE	NL	NU	NT	YT	Total
Conservative	Seats:	22	27	13	9	51	10	6	3	1	-	1	-	-	143
Conservative	Vote:	44.5	64.7	53.8	48.9	39.2	21.7	39.4	26.1	36.2	16.6	34.9	37.6	32.7	37.7
Liberal	Seats:	5	-	1	1	38	14	3	5	3	6	-	-	1	77
Liberal	Vote:	19.3	11.4	14.9	19.1	33.8	23.8	32.5	29.8	47.7	46.8	29.1	13.6	45.8	26.3
Bloc Québécois	Seats:						49								49
Bloc Québécois	Vote:						38.1								10.0
New Democratic	Seats:	9	1	-	4	17	1	1	2	-	1	-	1	-	37
New Democratic	Vote:	26.1	12.7	25.5	24.0	18.2	12.2	21.9	28.9	9.8	33.7	27.6	41.4	8.7	18.2
Green	Vote:	9.4	8.8	5.5	6.8	8.0	3.5	6.1	8.0	4.7	1.7	8.3	5.5	12.8	6.8
Independent / No affiliation	Seats:						1		1						2
Independent / No affiliation	Vote:						0.6		6.6						0.7
Total seats:		36	28	14	14	106	75	10	11	4	7	1	1	1	308

Source: Elections Canada

== Seats that changed hands ==
=== Incumbent MPs not running for re-election ===
==== Conservatives ====
Electoral District		Resigning incumbent	Succeeded by
NL	St. John's East	Norman Doyle	Jack Harris
NL	St. John's South—Mount Pearl	Loyola Hearn	Siobhán Coady
ON	Thunder Bay—Superior North	Joe Comuzzi	Bruce Hyer
MB	Portage—Lisgar	Brian Pallister	Candice Hoeppner
SK	Palliser	Dave Batters	Ray Boughen
SK	Prince Albert	Brian Fitzpatrick	Randy Hoback
SK	Saskatoon—Rosetown—Biggar	Carol Skelton	Kelly Block
AB	Calgary Northeast	Art Hanger	Devinder Shory
AB	Edmonton—St. Albert	John G. Williams	Brent Rathgeber
AB	Edmonton—Sherwood Park	Ken Epp	Tim Uppal
AB	Medicine Hat	Monte Solberg	LaVar Payne
AB	Red Deer	Bob Mills	Earl Dreeshen
AB	Wild Rose	Myron Thompson	Blake Richards
BC	Kamloops—Thompson—Cariboo	Betty Hinton	Cathy McLeod
BC	Vancouver Kingsway	David Emerson	Don Davies

==== Liberals ====
Electoral District		Resigning incumbent	Succeeded by
NL	Random—Burin—St. George's	Bill Matthews	Judy Foote
PEI	Egmont	Joe McGuire	Gail Shea
NB	Fredericton	Andy Scott	Keith Ashfield
QC	LaSalle—Émard	Paul Martin	Lise Zarac
ON	Brampton West	Colleen Beaumier	Andrew Kania
ON	Etobicoke North	Roy Cullen	Kirsty Duncan
ON	Huron—Bruce	Paul Steckle	Ben Lobb
ON	Newmarket—Aurora	Belinda Stronach	Lois Brown
ON	Nickel Belt	Raymond Bonin	Claude Gravelle
ON	Scarborough Southwest	Tom Wappel	Michelle Simson
NU	Nunavut	Nancy Karetak-Lindell	Leona Aglukkaq

==== Bloc Québécois ====
Electoral District		Resigning incumbent	Succeeded by
QC	Drummond	Pauline Picard	Roger Pomerleau
QC	Longueuil—Pierre-Boucher	Caroline St-Hilaire	Jean Dorion
QC	Repentigny	Raymond Gravel	Nicolas Dufour
QC	Rivière-des-Mille-Îles	Gilles Perron	Luc Desnoyers

==== New Democrats ====
Electoral District		Resigning incumbent	Succeeded by
NS	Halifax	Alexa McDonough	Megan Leslie
MB	Elmwood—Transcona	Bill Blaikie	Jim Maloway
BC	Surrey North	Penny Priddy	Dona Cadman

=== Vacancies upon dissolution ===
By-elections in progress in four vacant ridings were cancelled when the general election was called.

Electoral District		Previous MP	New MP
QC	Saint-Lambert	Maka Kotto	Josée Beaudin
QC	Westmount—Ville-Marie	Lucienne Robillard	Marc Garneau
ON	Don Valley West	John Godfrey	Rob Oliphant
ON	Guelph	Brenda Chamberlain	Frank Valeriote

=== Defeated incumbents ===
==== Conservatives ====
Electoral District		Incumbent	Defeated by
NL	Avalon	Fabian Manning	Scott Andrews
QC	Louis-Hébert	Luc Harvey	Pascal-Pierre Paillé
ON	Mississauga—Streetsville	Wajid Khan	Bonnie Crombie
AB	Edmonton—Strathcona	Rahim Jaffer	Linda Duncan

==== Liberals ====
Electoral District		Incumbent	Defeated by
NS	West Nova	Robert Thibault	Greg Kerr
NB	Miramichi	Charles Hubbard	Tilly O'Neill-Gordon
NB	Saint John	Paul Zed	Rodney Weston
ON	Algoma—Manitoulin—Kapuskasing	Brent St. Denis	Carol Hughes
ON	Brant	Lloyd St. Amand	Phil McColeman
ON	Halton	Garth Turner	Lisa Raitt
ON	Kenora	Roger Valley	Greg Rickford
ON	Kitchener Centre	Karen Redman	Stephen Woodworth
ON	Kitchener—Waterloo	Andrew Telegdi	Peter Braid
ON	London West	Sue Barnes	Ed Holder
ON	Mississauga—Erindale	Omar Alghabra	Bob Dechert
ON	Oak Ridges—Markham	Lui Temelkovski	Paul Calandra
ON	Oakville	Bonnie Brown	Terence Young
ON	Sudbury	Diane Marleau	Glenn Thibeault
ON	Thornhill	Susan Kadis	Peter Kent
ON	Thunder Bay—Rainy River	Ken Boshcoff	John Rafferty
ON	Welland	John Maloney	Malcolm Allen
MB	Churchill	Tina Keeper	Niki Ashton
MB	Saint Boniface	Raymond Simard	Shelly Glover
BC	Richmond	Raymond Chan	Alice Wong
BC	North Vancouver	Don Bell	Andrew Saxton

==== New Democrats ====
Electoral District		Incumbent	Defeated by
ON	Parkdale—High Park	Peggy Nash	Gerard Kennedy
BC	Vancouver Island North	Catherine Bell	John Duncan

==== Bloc Québécois ====
Electoral District		Incumbent	Defeated by
QC	Brossard—La Prairie	Marcel Lussier	Alexandra Mendès
QC	Papineau	Vivian Barbot	Justin Trudeau

==== Greens ====
Electoral District		Incumbent	Defeated by
BC	West Vancouver—Sunshine Coast—Sea to Sky Country	Blair Wilson	John Weston

==== Independents ====
Electoral District		Incumbent	Defeated by
QC	Rimouski-Neigette—Témiscouata—Les Basques	Louise Thibault	Claude Guimond

== Student vote results ==
Student votes are mock elections that run parallel to actual elections, in which students not of voting age participate. They are administered by Student Vote Canada. Student vote elections are for educational purposes and do not count towards the results. Though there were 308 ridings, only 289 were declared.

Summary of the 2008 Canadian Student Vote
Party	Leader	Seats		Popular vote	
Party	Leader	Elected	%	Votes	%
Conservative	Stephen Harper	100	34.6	108,429	26.8
New Democratic	Jack Layton	66	22.8	96,090	23.7
Liberal	Stéphane Dion	54	18.7	77,996	19.3
Green	Elizabeth May	44	15.2	101,119	25.0
Bloc Québécois	Gilles Duceppe	24	8.3	4,317	1.1
Independent		1	0.3	3,454	0.9
Total		289	100.00	404,848	100.00
Source: CBC

== See also ==
- List of Canadian federal general elections
- List of political parties in Canada
- Federal political financing in Canada
- Voter turnout in Canada
