= Bloc Québécois candidates in the 2008 Canadian federal election =

This is a list of nominated candidates for the Bloc Québécois political party in the 40th Canadian federal election.

== Candidates ==
Riding	Candidate's Name	Notes	Gender	Residence	Occupation	Votes	%	Rank	Ref.
Abitibi—Baie-James—Nunavik—Eeyou	Yvon Lévesque	Incumbent MP	M	Val-Senneville	Labour relations Councillor	10,995	39.65%	1st	
Abitibi—Témiscamingue	Marc Lemay	Incumbent MP	M	Rouyn-Noranda	Lawyer	20,929	47.91%	1st	
Ahuntsic	Maria Mourani	Incumbent MP	F	Blainville	Parliamentarian	18,815	39.48%	1st	
Alfred-Pellan	Robert Carrier	Incumbent MP	M	Laval	Engineer	20,686	38.83%	1st	
Argenteuil—Papineau—Mirabel	Mario Laframboise	Incumbent MP	M	Notre-Dame-de-la-Paix	Parliamentarian	26,455	48.10%	1st	
Bas-Richelieu—Nicolet—Bécancour	Louis Plamondon	Incumbent MP and Dean of the House	M	Sorel-Tracy	Parliamentarian	26,821	54.67%	1st	
Beauce	André Côté		M	Saint-Georges	Recreologist	7,143	13.98%	2nd	
Beauharnois—Salaberry	Claude DeBellefeuille	Incumbent MP	F	Ormstown	Parliamentarian	26,904	50.06%	1st	
Beauport—Limoilou	Éléonore Mainguy		F	Quebec City	Clerk	15,962	32.61%	2nd	
Berthier—Maskinongé	Guy André	Incumbent MP	M	Trois-Rivières	Parliamentarian	24,945	45.82%	1st	
Bourassa	Daniel Mailhot		M	Montreal	Adjunct-Director of the Montreal School Board	10,145	25.42%	2nd	
Brome—Missisquoi	Christian Ouellet	Incumbent MP	M	Cowansville	Architect	17,561	35.20%	1st	
Brossard—La Prairie	Marcel Lussier	Incumbent MP	M	Brossard	Engineer	19,034	32.46%	2nd	
Chambly—Borduas	Yves Lessard	Incumbent MP	M	Saint-Basile-le-Grand	Labour Relations Councillor	31,773	50.03%	1st	
Charlesbourg—Haute-Saint-Charles	Denis Courteau		M	Quebec City	Regional Councillor	14,602	29.21%	2nd	
Châteauguay—Saint-Constant	Carole Freeman	Incumbent MP	F	Léry	Lawyer	25,086	45.58%	1st	
Chicoutimi—Le Fjord	Robert Bouchard	Incumbent MP	M	Chicoutimi	Parliamentarian	19,737	41.31%	1st	
Compton—Stanstead	France Bonsant	Incumbent MP	F	Sherbrooke	Parliamentarian	20,332	41.85%	1st	
Drummond	Roger Pomerleau		M	Lefebvre	Political Assistant	17,613	38.79%	1st	
Gaspésie—Îles-de-la-Madeleine	Raynald Blais	Incumbent MP	M	Chandler	Parliamentarian	14,636	40.10%	1st	
Gatineau	Richard Nadeau	Incumbent MP	M	Gatineau	Parliamentarian	15,189	29.15%	1st	
Haute-Gaspésie—La Mitis—Matane—Matapédia	Jean-Yves Roy	Incumbent MP	M	Rimouski	Teacher	11,368	37.59%	1st	
Hochelaga	Réal Ménard	Incumbent MP	M	Montreal	Political Scientist	22,720	49.73%	1st	
Honoré-Mercier	Gérard Labelle		M	L'Île-Perrot	Businessman	13,871	28.11%	2nd	
Hull—Aylmer	Raphael Déry		M	Gatineau	French Professor	11,625	22.04%	2nd	
Jeanne-Le Ber	Thierry St-Cyr	Incumbent MP	M	Montreal	Engineer	17,144	34.91%	1st	
Joliette	Pierre Paquette	Incumbent MP	M	Saint-Alphonse-Rodriguez	Economist	28,040	52.39%	1st	
Jonquière—Alma	Chantale Bouchard		F	Montreal	Lawyer	19,035	37.49%	2nd	
La Pointe-de-l'Île	Francine Lalonde	Incumbent MP	F	Laval	Parliamentarian	25,976	56.09%	1st	
Lac-Saint-Louis	Maxime Clément		M	L'Assomption	Student	2,953	5.74%	5th	
LaSalle—Émard	Frédéric Isaya		M	Montreal	Actor	10,384	24.47%	2nd	
Laurentides—Labelle	Johanne Deschamps	Incumbent MP	F	Mont-Laurier	Parliamentarian	24,956	47.08%	1st	
Laurier—Sainte-Marie	Gilles Duceppe	Incumbent MP and Party Leader	M	Montreal	Parliamentarian	24,103	50.24%	1st	
Laval	Nicole Demers	Incumbent MP	F	Laval	Parliamentarian	19,085	37.79%	1st	
Laval—Les Îles	Mohamedali Jetha		M	Laval	Machinist	12,576	23.54%	2nd	
Lévis—Bellechasse	Guy Bergeron		M	Quebec City	Political Scientist	13,747	25.45%	2nd	
Longueuil—Pierre-Boucher	Jean Dorion		M	Montreal	Sociologist	23,118	46.12%	1st	
Lotbinière—Chutes-de-la-Chaudière	Antoine Sarrazin-Bourgoin		M	Saint-Antoine-de-Tilly	Student	12,738	24.57%	2nd	
Louis-Hébert	Pascal-Pierre Paillé		M	Quebec City	Teacher	20,992	36.23%	1st	
Louis-Saint-Laurent	France Gagné		F	Quebec City	Technician	13,330	26.53%	2nd	
Manicouagan	Gérard Asselin	Incumbent MP	M	Baie-Comeau	Parliamentarian	15,272	49.28%	1st	
Marc-Aurèle-Fortin	Serge Ménard	Incumbent MP	M	Saint-Lambert	Lawyer	25,552	45.52%	1st	
Mégantic—L'Érable	Pierre Turcotte		M	Thetford Mines	Notary	12,283	27.71%	2nd	
Montcalm	Roger Gaudet	Incumbent MP	M	Saint-Liguori	Parliamentarian	33,519	55.68%	1st	
Montmagny—L'Islet—Kamouraska—Rivière-du-Loup	Paul Crête	Incumbent MP	M	La Pocatière	Parliamentarian	20,494	46.03%	1st	
Montmorency—Charlevoix—Haute-Côte-Nord	Michel Guimond	Incumbent MP	M	Boischatel	Parliamentarian and Lawyer	21,068	48.87%	1st	
Mount Royal	Maryse Lavallée		F	Montreal	Director of Québec Alcohol Corporation	1,543	4.35%	5th	
Notre-Dame-de-Grâce—Lachine	Eric Taillefer		M	Terrebonne	Student	6,962	15.88%	3rd	
Outremont	Marcela Valdivia	Valdivia is of Chilean background. She previously ran for the BQ in the 2000 federal election in Westmount—Ville-Marie, finishing third.	F	Montreal	Lawyer	4,554	12.54%	3rd	
Papineau	Vivian Barbot	Incumbent MP	F	Montreal	Parliamentarian	16,535	38.69%	2nd	
Pierrefonds—Dollard	Reny Gagnon		M	Laval	Insurance Salesman	4,357	9.52%	4th	
Pontiac	Marius Tremblay		M	Plaisance	Composer/Researcher	9,576	22.33%	3rd	
Portneuf—Jacques-Cartier	Richard Côté	Director at Strategic Counsel	M	Neuville	Polling Director	14,401	32.01%	2nd	
Québec	Christiane Gagnon	Incumbent MP	F	Quebec City	Real Estate Agent	21,064	41.76%	1st	
Repentigny	Nicolas Dufour		M	Repentigny	Student	31,007	53.03%	1st	
Richmond—Arthabaska	André Bellavance	Incumbent MP	M	Victoriaville	Parliamentarian	23,913	46.01%	1st	
Rimouski-Neigette—Témiscouata—Les Basques	Claude Guimond		M	Rimouski	Farmer	17,652	44.68%	1st	
Rivière-des-Mille-Îles	Luc Desnoyers		M	Montreal	Retired	23,216	45.67%	1st	
Rivière-du-Nord	Monique Guay	Incumbent MP	F	Prévost	Parliamentarian	26,588	53.57%	1st	
Roberval—Lac-Saint-Jean	Claude Pilote		M	Roberval	Businessman	14,619	39.65%	2nd	
Rosemont—La Petite-Patrie	Bernard Bigras	Incumbent MP	M	Montreal	Parliamentarian	27,260	52.00%	1st	
Saint-Bruno—Saint-Hubert	Carole Lavallée	Incumbent MP	F	Longueuil	Communicator	23,767	44.98%	1st	
Saint-Hyacinthe—Bagot	Ève-Mary Thaï Thi Lac	Incumbent MP	F	Saint-Hyacinthe	Parliamentarian	22,719	47.36%	1st	
Saint-Jean	Claude Bachand	Incumbent MP	M	Saint-Jean-sur-Richelieu	Parliamentarian	26,506	49.61%	1st	
Saint-Lambert	Josée Beaudin		F	Belœil	Coordinator	16,346	37.62%	1st	
Saint-Laurent—Cartierville	Jacques Lachaine		M	Montreal	Retired Teacher	4,611	11.34%	3rd	
Saint-Léonard—Saint-Michel	Farid Salem		M	Longueuil	Consultant	5,146	13.60%	3rd	
Saint-Maurice—Champlain	Jean-Yves Laforest	Incumbent MP	M	Shawinigan	Gym Teacher	20,397	43.96%	1st	
Shefford	Robert Vincent	Incumbent MP	M	Granby	Parliamentarian	21,650	42.82%	1st	
Sherbrooke	Serge Cardin	Incumbent MP	M	Sherbrooke	Parliamentarian	25,502	50.7%	1st	
Terrebonne—Blainville	Diane Bourgeois	Incumbent MP	F	Terrebonne	Parliamentarian	28,303	52.34%	1st	
Trois-Rivières	Paule Brunelle	Incumbent MP	F	Champlain	Parliamentarian	22,405	45.26%	1st	
Vaudreuil—Soulanges	Meili Faille	Incumbent MP	F	Rigaud	Parliamentarian	27,044	41.34%	1st	
Verchères—Les Patriotes	Luc Malo	Incumbent MP	M	Contrecoeur	Parliamentarian	27,602	50.84%	1st	
Westmount—Ville-Marie	Charles Larivée		M	Montreal	Logistic Service Coordinator	2,818	7.25%	4th	

== See also ==
- Results of the Canadian federal election, 2008
- Results by riding for the Canadian federal election, 2008
