= Julie Van Dusen =

Canadian journalist

Julie Van Dusen is a Canadian journalist who works for CBC News and hosts the CPAC Today in Politics podcast. She is also a panelist on CBC Radio Ottawa's All in a Day.

Van Dusen graduated with a degree in French literature and studied communications at the University of Ottawa. Van Dusen comes from a family of journalists; five of her siblings, including Peter Van Dusen and her father, Thomas Van Dusen, are also reporters. After graduating from university, she began working for the Privy Council Office then as a researcher for FP News Service and Maclean's magazine as a reporter and researcher for the Parliament Hill bureau. Van Dusen began working for the CBC in 1983 at CBC Ottawa. She became a CBC Television news reporter in 1988.

== Controversy ==
On June 29, 2017, Van Dusen attended a press conference held by a group of family members of Missing and Murdered Indigenous Women and Girls (MMIWG). Van Dusen questioned an Indigenous teen about Canadian Prime Minister Justin Trudeau's work with the Indigenous community asking, "but how can he be blamed for that? You don't think that anything he's doing is helping the situation? Is it.. is he.. Is he an improvement over Stephen Harper? I mean, wha what, talk about his record." Activist Jocelyn Wabano-Iahtail cut in at this point and asked Van Dusen, "Excuse me? Did I just hear you correctly?" Then proceeds to shut down Van Dussen claiming Van Dussen's line of questioning is disrespectful, Jocelyn Wabano-Iahtail references one of the many unsolved deaths of young Indigenous teenagers in Thunder Bay, where Van Dussen pushes back saying, "It's a simple question." In response, the Indigenous activist addresses Van Dusen, first by stating that Van Dusen is a guest here, and secondly, addressing Van Dusen's harmful tone and delivery, and then said to Van Dusen, "You're done." While Glen McGregor and Julie Van Dusen begin speaking over one another, activist Jocelyn answers the journalist's question, stating, "She (Jocelyn) can speak for herself." Calling Julie out on her white privilege and how easy it is for her to ask disrespectful questions and how quickly her "white man comes and sticks up for [you]." When CTV journalist Glen McGregor followed up with a similar question, the activists told him "You're a guest here. Without us you'd be homeless." Shortly after, activist Jocelyn cancelled the press conference, walking out of the room. CBC political commentator Martin Patriquin described it as "Racism, sexism, and a press conference gone horribly wrong."

Prime Minister of Canada Justin Trudeau issued a statement that same day stating, "We recognize that over the past decades, generations, indeed centuries, Canada has failed Indigenous Peoples." The fallout from this event was occurring simultaneously with one in Canada's north where the "British media weren't impressed when Prince Charles and his wife Camilla had trouble controlling their laughter during a traditional throat singing ceremony in Iqaluit".
