= New Democratic Party candidates in the 2011 Canadian federal election =

This is a list of New Democratic Party in the 2011 Canadian federal election. The NDP nominated candidates in all of Canada's 308 ridings; 103 of whom were elected. Following the election, the NDP was the second largest party in the House of Commons, and formed the Official Opposition.

The party's list of candidates in 2011 included the largest number of women ever nominated by a major party in an election campaign, with 123 female candidates comprising 39.9 per cent of the party's total slate.

== Newfoundland and Labrador – 7 seats ==
Riding	Candidate's Name	Notes	Gender	Residence	Occupation	Votes	%	Rank
Avalon	Matthew Fuchs		M			5,172	14.16	3
Bonavista—Gander—Grand Falls—Windsor	Clyde Bridger	Ran in St. John's South in the 2007 provincial election. Born in St. John's	M			4,277	13.82	
Humber—St. Barbe—Baie Verte	Shelley Senior	2007 provincial by-election candidate in Humber Valley	F	McIvers	Lawyer	4,751	15.85	3
Labrador	Jacob Larkin		M			2,099	20.04	3
Random—Burin—St. George's	Stella Magalios		F			4,466	17.17	3
St. John's East	Jack Harris	Current Member of Parliament. Former leader of the Newfoundland and Labrador New Democratic Party (1992–2006). Represented this riding from 1987 to 1988 and since 2008. Represented Signal Hill-Quidi Vidi in the Newfoundland House of Assembly from 1990 to 2006.	M	St. John's	Lawyer	31,392	71.22	1
St. John's South—Mount Pearl	Ryan Cleary	2008 Candidate in this riding	M	St. John's	Journalist	18,573	47.80	1

== Prince Edward Island – 4 seats ==
Riding	Candidate's Name	Notes	Gender	Residence	Occupation	Votes	%	Rank
Cardigan	Lorne Cudmore	1984 candidate in this riding. Also ran in the 2003 provincial election in Montague-Kilmuir.	M	Montague	Retired trainer	2,164	10.24	3
Charlottetown	Joe Byrne	Educated at St. Francis Xavier University and UPEI	M		Administrator	4,632	25.08	3
Egmont	Jacquie Robichaud	Wife of the late Gary Robichaud, former leader of the Island New Democrats	F	Charlottetown	Nanny	2,369	12.37	3
Malpeque	Rita Jackson	Educated at UPEI	F		Retired from the Canadian Armed Forces	2,970	14.63	3

== Nova Scotia – 11 seats ==
Riding	Candidate's Name	Notes	Gender	Residence	Occupation	Votes	%	Rank
Cape Breton—Canso	Marney Simmons	Mayor of Mulgrave (2008–). Educated at Queen's University.	F	Mulgrave	Consultant	7,036	19.82	3
Central Nova	David Parker	Brother of MLA Charlie Parker Pictou County Councillor (2000–present)	M		Teacher	9,386	24.70	2
Cumberland—Colchester—Musquodoboit Valley	Wendy Robinson	Deputy Mayor of the Town of Stewiacke	F	Stewiacke	Political assistant	9,322	23.26	2
Dartmouth—Cole Harbour	Robert Chisholm	Former leader of the Nova Scotia New Democratic Party (1998–1999). Represented Halifax Atlantic in the Nova Scotia Legislative Assembly (1991–2003).	M		Consultant	15,661	36.25	1
Halifax	Megan Leslie	Incumbent Member of Parliament (2008–present)	F	Halifax	Lawyer	23,745	51.63	1
Halifax West	Gregor Ash	Executive Director, Atlantic Film Festival. Born in Clarenville, Newfoundland and Labrador. Educated at SFU.	M	Halifax	Administrator	13,239	29.30	3
Kings—Hants	Mark Rogers		M			8,043	20.03	3
Sackville—Eastern Shore	Peter Stoffer	Incumbent Member of Parliament (1997–present)	M	Windsor Junction	Manager	22,480	54.07	1
South Shore—St. Margaret's	Gordon Earle	Former Member of Parliament (Halifax West, 1997–2000); First Black Canadian MP in Nova Scotia	M	Upper Tantallon	Retired Public Servant	15,058	36.18	2
Sydney—Victoria	Kathy MacLeod		F		Trade unionist	7,050	19.11	3
West Nova	George Barron	Ran in this riding in 2008. Born in Paris, Ontario.	M		Paramedic	5,631	13.08	3

== New Brunswick – 10 seats ==
Riding	Candidate's Name	Notes	Gender	Residence	Occupation	Votes	%	Rank
Acadie—Bathurst	Yvon Godin	Incumbent Member of Parliament (1997–2015)	M	Bathurst	Trade unionist	32,017	69.66	1
Beauséjour	Susan Levi-Peters	Former Chief of Elsipogtog First Nation. Ran in Kent in the 2010 provincial election.	F		Manager	10,397	23.35	3
Fredericton	Jesse Travis	Interim provincial NDP leader Ran in this riding in 2008.	M	Rusagonis	Consultant	10,522	23.75	2
Fundy Royal	Darryl Pitre	Ran in Riverview in the 2010 provincial election.	M		Sales	9,880	26.97	2
Madawaska—Restigouche	Widler Jules	Ran in Campbellton-Restigouche Centre in the 2010 provincial election. Educated at University of Moncton and Université du Québec.	M	Atholville	Consultant	6,512	18.63	3
Miramichi	Patrick Colford	Red seal chef	M	Warwick Settlement	Trade unionist	7,097	23.07	2
Moncton—Riverview—Dieppe	Shawna Gagné	Ran in Moncton West in the 2010 provincial election.	F		Businessperson	14,053	30.10	3
New Brunswick Southwest	Andrew G. Graham	2006 and 2008 candidate in this riding. Ran in Western Charlotte in the 1999 and 2003 provincial elections and in Charlotte-Campobello in the 2006 provincial election. Born in 1959 in London, Ontario. Educated at the New Brunswick College of Craft and Design.	M	Saint John	Tradesperson	7,413	23.31	2
Saint John	Rob Moir	Ran in Fundy Royal in 2006 and 2008.	M	Clifton Royal	Professor	11,322	30.56	2
Tobique—Mactaquac	Pierre Cyr	Ran in Grand Falls-Drummond-Saint-André in the 2003 and 2006 provincial elections. Born on January 10, 1966. Attended Moncton University.	M		Nurse	6,403	18.99	2

== Quebec – 75 seats ==
Riding	Candidate's Name	Notes	Gender	Residence	Occupation	Votes	%	Rank
Abitibi—Baie-James—Nunavik—Eeyou	Roméo Saganash		M			13,966	44.71%	1
Abitibi—Témiscamingue	Christine Moore	2006 and 2008 candidate in this riding	F	La Reine	Nurse	24,763	51.32%	1
Ahuntsic	Chantal Reeves		F	Montréal	Psychoeducator	14,200	30.29%	2
Alfred-Pellan	Rosane Doré Lefebvre		F			23,048	42.03%	1
Argenteuil—Papineau—Mirabel	Mylène Freeman	One of five current McGill University students who went on to win seats, Freeman was due to graduate within days of the election.	F		Student	25,801	44.24%	1
Bas-Richelieu—Nicolet—Bécancour	Krista Lalonde	Lalonde has a criminology degree from Carleton University with a focus in law.	F	Montréal	Resolution specialist	17,705	35.60%	2/5
Beauce	Serge Bergeron		M	Saint-Victor	Retired teacher	15,849	29.99%	2
Beauharnois—Salaberry	Anne Minh-Thu Quach	2008 candidate in this riding	F	Valleyfield	Teacher	23,978	43.78%	1
Beauport—Limoilou	Raymond Côté	2006 and 2008 candidate in Lotbinière—Chutes-de-la-Chaudière.	M	Québec		24,305	46.1%	1
Berthier—Maskinongé	Ruth Ellen Brosseau	Single mother. The Globe and Mail featured her mid-campaign vacation to Las Vegas; it was apparently booked before the election was called.	F	Hull	Assistant manager, Oliver's Pub, at Carleton University	22,484	39.63%	1
Bourassa	Julie Demers	2008 candidate in Haute-Gaspésie—La Mitis—Matane—Matapédia	F		Columnist and translator	12,202	32.10%	2
Brome—Missisquoi	Pierre Jacob		M	Lac-Brome	Retired criminologist	22,407	42.64%	1
Brossard—La Prairie	Hoang Mai	2008 candidate in this riding	M	Montréal	Notary	25,512	41.03%	1
Chambly—Borduas	Matthew Dubé	Co-president of McGill's NDP club. The Globe and Mail reports his Twitter posts during the election were primarily about comics and hockey.	M		Student	29,598	42.72%	1
Charlesbourg—Haute-Saint-Charles	Anne-Marie Day	2008 candidate in this riding	F	Québec	Director of employment agency	24,130	45%	1
Châteauguay—Saint-Constant	Sylvain Chicoine		M	Delson	Constable	29,156	52.03%	1
Chicoutimi—Le Fjord	Dany Morin		M	Chicoutimi	Chiropractor	19,433	38.21%	1
Compton—Stanstead	Jean Rousseau		M		Producer	24,097	47.59%	1
Drummond	François Choquette	2006 candidate in this riding	M		Teacher	24,489	51.69%	1
Gaspésie—Îles-de-la-Madeleine	Philip Toone		M	Carleton-sur-Mer	Notary	12,421	33.76%	1
Gatineau	Françoise Boivin	2008 Candidate for NDP, former Liberal MP	F	Gatineau	Lawyer	35,268	61.89%	1
Haute-Gaspésie—La Mitis—Matane—Matapédia	Joanie Boulet		F		Student	7,484	21.35%	3
Hochelaga	Marjolaine Boutin-Sweet		F		Interpreter and museum guide	22,273	48.16%	1
Honoré-Mercier	Paulina Ayala		F	Montréal	Teacher	17,545	36.34%	1
Hull—Aylmer	Nycole Turmel	Former national president of the Public service alliance of Canada	F	Gatineau	Trade Unionist	35,194	59.19%	1
Jeanne-Le Ber	Tyrone Benskin		M		Actor	23,047	44.32%	1
Joliette	Francine Raynault	2008 candidate in this riding.	F	Crabtree	Volunteer	26,950	47.26%	1
Jonquière—Alma	Claude Patry		M		Trade unionist	22,900	43.44%	1
Lac-Saint-Louis	Alain Ackad		M		Industrial engineer	16,253	30.04%	2
La Pointe-de-l'Île	Ève Péclet		F		Student	23,001	48.31%	1
LaSalle—Émard	Hélène LeBlanc		F		Agronomist	17,691	42.15%	1
Laurentides—Labelle	Marc-André Morin		M			24,660	43.68%	1
Laurier—Sainte-Marie	Hélène Laverdière		F	Montréal	Translator	23,377	46.64%	1
Laval	José Nunez-Melo		M		Civil servant	22,038	43.24%	1
Laval—Les Îles	François Pilon	2004, 2006 and 2008 candidate in Honoré-Mercier	M	Montréal	Civil servant	25,685	47.72%	1
Lévis—Bellechasse	Nicole Laliberté		F	Montréal	Retired educator	19,850	33.8%	2
Longueuil—Pierre-Boucher	Pierre Nantel		M	Longueuil	Researcher-commentator	26,976	51.9%	1
Lotbinière—Chutes-de-la-Chaudière	Tanya Fredette		F		Student	21,683	38.5%	2
Louis-Hébert	Denis Blanchette	2006 and 2008 candidate in this riding	M	Cap-Rouge	Computer analyst	22,386	38.67%	1
Louis-Saint-Laurent	Alexandrine Latendresse	2008 candidate in this riding	F	Québec	Student	22,626	39.8%	1
Manicouagan	Jonathan Genest-Jourdain		M		Lawyer	16,438	48.93%	1
Marc-Aurèle-Fortin	Alain Giguère		M		Lawyer	28,998	49.58%	1
Mégantic—L'Érable	Cheryl Voisine		F			11,686	26.27%	2
Montcalm	Manon Perreault	Former municipal councillor (2002–2009) in Sainte-Marie-Salomé	F	Saint-Jacques de Montcalm		34,391	52.93%	1
Montmagny—L'Islet—Kamouraska—Rivière-du-Loup	François Lapointe	2008 candidate in this riding	M	L'Islet	Literacy worker	17,285	36.36%	1
Montmorency—Charlevoix—Haute-Côte-Nord	Jonathan Tremblay		M		Bricklayer and mason	17,532	37.26%	1
Mount Royal	Jeff Itcush	1997 and 2000 candidate in other ridings	M	Montréal	Teacher	6,963	17.85%	3
Notre-Dame-de-Grâce—Lachine	Isabelle Morin		F	Montréal	Teacher	17,943	39.68%	1
Outremont	Thomas Mulcair	MP	M	Montréal	Lawyer and parliamentarian	21,916	56.38%	1
Papineau	Marcos Tejada		M			12,102	28.30%	2
Pierrefonds—Dollard	Lysane Blanchette-Lamothe		F		Student	16,390	34.20%	1
Pontiac	Mathieu Ravignat	Ran as an independent Laurier—Sainte-Marie in 1997.	M	Orleans, Ontario	Instructor	22,497	45.80%	1
Portneuf—Jacques-Cartier	Élaine Michaud		F	Québec	Student and information officer	22,000	42.76%	1
Québec	Annick Papillon		F	Québec	Interviewer	22,398	42.65%	1
Repentigny	Jean-François Larose		M		Peace officer	32,111	51.92%	1
Richmond—Arthabaska	Isabelle Maguire	2006 candidate in this riding and in 2008 in La Pointe-de-l'Île	F			17,316	32.48%	2
Rimouski-Neigette—Témiscouata—Les Basques	Guy Caron	2004, 2006 and 2008 candidate in this riding	M	Gatineau	Economist	18,365	43.01%	1
Rivière-des-Mille-Îles	Laurin Liu	One of five current McGill students to win seats.	F		Student	25,639	49.21%	1
Rivière-du-Nord	Pierre Dionne Labelle		M		Development agent	29,603	55.07%	1
Roberval—Lac-Saint-Jean	Yvon Guay		M	Saint-Félicien		11,153	27.62%	2
Rosemont—La Petite-Patrie	Alexandre Boulerice	2008 Candidate in this riding	M	Montréal	Communications advisor	27,484	50.81%	1
Saint-Bruno—Saint-Hubert	Djaouida Sellah		F		Physician	24,361	44.63%	1
Saint-Hyacinthe—Bagot	Marie-Claude Morin		F		Student	26,870	52.17%	1
Saint-Jean	Tarik Brahmi		M	Saint-Jean-sur-Richelieu	Senior Interviewer	24,899	47.44%	1
Saint-Lambert	Sadia Groguhé		F		Counselor	17,778	42.20%	1
Saint-Laurent—Cartierville	Maria Ximena Florez		F		Director of community organization	11,948	29.28%	2
Saint-Léonard—Saint-Michel	Roberta Peressini		F	Saint-Léonard		11,715	32.30%	2
Saint-Maurice—Champlain	Lise St-Denis		F			18,628	39.06%	1
Shefford	Réjean Genest		M	Granby	Gardener and writer	27,575	51.08%	1
Sherbrooke	Pierre-Luc Dusseault	Dusseault, just weeks short of his 20th birthday, went on to become the youngest person ever to win election to Commons in Canadian history.	M	Sherbrooke	Student	22,344	42.99%	1
Terrebonne—Blainville	Charmaine Borg	Co-president of McGill's NDP club.	F		Student and labour relations agent	28,236	49.37%	1
Trois-Rivières	Robert Aubin		M		Teacher and union representative	26,981	53.59%	1
Vaudreuil—Soulanges	Jamie Nicholls	A McGill graduate student and one of five McGill students who won seats.	M		Student and landscape architect	30,219	43.63%	1
Verchères—Les Patriotes	Sana Hassainia		F			24,724	43.90%	1
Westmount—Ville-Marie	Joanne Corbeil		F			14,703	35.59%	2

== Ontario – 106 seats ==
Riding	Candidate's Name	Notes	Gender	Residence	Occupation	Votes	%	Rank
Ajax—Pickering	Jim Koppens		M					
Algoma—Manitoulin—Kapuskasing	Carol Hughes	Current Member of Parliament	F	Hanmer	Representative			
Ancaster—Dundas—Flamborough—Westdale	Alex Johnstone		F	Hamilton	Public Fundraiser/Social Worker			
Barrie	Myrna Clark	2008 Candidate in this riding	F	Barrie	Teacher			
Beaches—East York	Matthew Kellway		M					
Bramalea—Gore—Malton	Jagmeet Singh Dhaliwal		M		Lawyer			
Brampton—Springdale	Manjit Grewal							
Brampton West	Jagtar Singh Shergill	Candidate in this riding in 2006 and 2008	M	Brampton	Insurance and Financial Advisor			
Brant	Marc Laferriere		M	Brantford	Clinical social worker			
Bruce—Grey—Owen Sound	Karen Gventer		F	Hepworth	Program coordination assistant			
Burlington	David Carter Laird	2003 provincial, 2004, 2006, and 2008 candidate in this riding	M	Burlington	Social worker	TBD	TBD	TBD
Cambridge	Susan Galvao		F	Cambridge	Activist			
Carleton—Mississippi Mills	Erin Peters		F					
Chatham-Kent—Essex	Ron Franko		M					
Davenport	Andrew Cash	Former bandmate of MP Charlie Angus	M	Toronto	Musician			
Don Valley East	Mary Trapani Hynes		F					
Don Valley West	Nicole Yovanoff		F					
Dufferin—Caledon	Leslie Parsons		F					
Durham	Tammy Schoep		F	Bowmanville	Laid off auto worker			
Eglinton—Lawrence	Justin Chatwin		M		Copy editor			
Elgin—Middlesex—London	Fred Sinclair	Replaced former candidate Ryan Dolby who defected to the Liberals.	M	Manufacturer		TBD	TBD	TBD
Essex	Taras Natyshak	2006 and 2008 candidate in this riding	M	Belle River	Labourer			
Etobicoke Centre	Ana Maria Rivero	Née Sapp. Ran in Etobicoke North in the 2000 election.	F		Retired administrative assistant			
Etobicoke—Lakeshore	Michael Erickson		M		Teacher			
Etobicoke North	Diana Andrews		F		Teacher			
Glengarry—Prescott—Russell	Denis Séguin		M	St. Albert	Member services representative			
Guelph	Bobbi Stewart		F	Guelph	Social Worker			
Haldimand—Norfolk	Ian Nichols	2008 candidate in this riding.	M	Simcoe	Transportation Engineer			
Haliburton—Kawartha Lakes—Brock	Lyn Edwards	Candidate in this riding in the 2009 by-election	F	Oakwood	Civic employee			
Halton	Patricia Heroux	2007 provincial candidate in this district	F	Campbellville	Labour union leader			
Hamilton Centre	David Christopherson	Member of Parliament	M					
Hamilton East—Stoney Creek	Wayne Marston	Current Member of Parliament	M	Hamilton	Parliamentarian			
Hamilton Mountain	Chris Charlton	Current Member of Parliament	F	Hamilton	Parliamentarian			
Huron—Bruce	Grant Robertson							
Kenora	Tania Cameron	2008 candidate in same riding	F	Kenora	Band Manager	TBD	TBD	TBD
Kingston and the Islands	Daniel Beals		M	Kingston	Supply co-ordinator	13,065	21.54	3rd
Kitchener Centre	Peter Thurley		M					
Kitchener—Conestoga	Lorne Bruce							
Kitchener—Waterloo	William Brown		M		Banker			
Lambton—Kent—Middlesex	Joseph Hill	2008 candidate in this riding	M	Sarnia	Small Business Owner			
Lanark—Frontenac—Lennox and Addington	Doug Smyth		M	On Mississippi Lake	Auto parts			
Leeds—Grenville	Matthew Gabriel	1st Time Candidate	M	Augusta	CEP VP Union Steward			
London—Fanshawe	Irene Mathyssen	Incumbent MP	F	Ilderton	Teacher	TBD	TBD	TBD
London North Centre	German Gutierrez		M		Professor			
London West	Peter Lawrence Ferguson	2008 candidate in this riding	M	London	Scientist / Researcher			
Markham—Unionville	Nadine Hawkins		F					
Mississauga—Brampton South	Jim Glavan		M		Head custodian (Peel District School Board)			
Mississauga East—Cooksville	Waseem Ahmed		M		Account manager, mechanical engineer			
Mississauga—Erindale	Michelle Bilek		F		Educator			
Mississauga South	Farah Kalbouneh		F		Customer service representative			
Mississauga—Streetsville	Aijaz Naqvi		M		Electrical engineer			
Nepean—Carleton	Ric Dagenais	2008 Candidate in this riding	M					
Newmarket—Aurora	Kassandra Bidarian							
Niagara Falls	Heather Kelley							
Niagara West—Glanbrook	David Heatley		M	Niagara Falls	Environmentalist			
Nickel Belt	Claude Gravelle	Incumbent MP	M	Chelmsford	Retired	TBD	TBD	TBD
Nipissing—Timiskaming	Rona Eckert		F	North Bay	Postal worker			
Northumberland—Quinte West	Patrick Clark		M	Cobourg	Student			
Oak Ridges—Markham	Janice Hagan	2000 candidate in Markham; 2004 and 2006 candidate in Markham—Unionville	F	Markham	Educational Advisor			
Oakville	James Ede		M	Oakville	Community Activist		M	
Oshawa	Chris Buckley	President of the CAW Union Local 222	M	Oshawa	Union President			
Ottawa Centre	Paul Dewar	Current Member of Parliament	M	Ottawa	Parliamentarian			
Ottawa—Orléans	John Courtneidge		M					
Ottawa South	James McLaren	Provincial candidate in this riding in 1999 and 2003.	M	Ottawa	Teacher			
Ottawa—Vanier	Trevor Haché	Trevor Haché ran previously for the riding of Ottawa-Vanier in the 2008 Election. He is active in his community through his volunteer work which includes being a member of the Action Sandy Hill community association, as well as a supporter of the Vanier chapter of the Association of Community Organizations for Reform Now (ACORN). Trevor is also responsible for founding the Sandy Hill community garden which donates a portion of its crops to local found banks. Trevor's educational background is in journalism and he was awarded for his work as a journalist in 2003 when he was awarded the top prize for investigative journalism in Canada by the Canadian Association of Journalists.	M	Sandy Hill, Ottawa	Policy Coordinator, Ecology Ottawa			
Ottawa West—Nepean	Marlene Rivier	2004, 2006 and 2008 candidate in this riding	F	Ottawa	Psychologist			
Oxford	Paul Arsenault		M		Linguistics consultant, phonology instructor			
Parkdale—High Park	Peggy Nash	Former MP for this riding (2006–2008)	F	Toronto	Labour negotiator			
Parry Sound-Muskoka	Wendy Wilson		F	Parry Sound	physician			
Perth Wellington	Ellen Papenburg		F					
Peterborough	Dave Nickle	Candidate in the 1999, 2003 and 2007 provincial elections in this district.	M	Peterborough	Teacher			
Pickering—Scarborough East	Andrea Moffat	2007 provincial and 2008 federal candidate in this riding.	F					
Prince Edward—Hastings	Michael McMahon		M					
Renfrew—Nipissing—Pembroke	Eric Burton	Former Arnprior town councillor (2006–2010)	M	Arnprior	Not for profit			
Richmond Hill	Adam DeVita		M	Richmond Hill	High technology engineer			
St. Catharines	Mike Williams		M	St. Catharines	CNC Machinist			
St. Paul's	William Molls		M		Graphic and web designer			
Sarnia—Lambton	Brian White		M					
Sault Ste. Marie	Tony Martin	Member of Parliament	M					
Scarborough—Agincourt	Nancy Patchell		F					
Scarborough Centre	Natalie Hundt	2008 candidate in this riding.	F	Scarborough	Community organizer			
Scarborough-Guildwood	Danielle Ouellette		F					
Scarborough—Rouge River	Rathika Sitsabaiesan		F					
Scarborough Southwest	Dan Harris	2000, 2004 and 2006 candidate in this riding.	M					
Simcoe—Grey	Katy Austin	2006 and 2008 candidate in this riding.	F	Elmvale	Retired Teacher			
Simcoe North	Richard Joseph Banigan		M					
Stormont—Dundas—South Glengarry	Darlene Jalbert	2008 candidate in same riding	F	Cornwall	Support Staff WHSC	TBD	TBD	TBD
Sudbury	Glenn Thibeault	Incumbent MP	M	Garson	Executive Director	TBD	TBD	TBD
Thornhill	Simon Strelchik	2006 and 2008 candidate in this riding	M	Thornhill	Student			
Thunder Bay—Rainy River	John Rafferty	Current Member of Parliament	M	Fort Frances	Self employed			
Thunder Bay—Superior North	Bruce Hyer	Current Member of Parliament	M	Thunder Bay	Biologist	TBD	TBD	TBD
Timmins-James Bay	Charlie Angus	Current Member of Parliament	M	Cobalt	Parliamentarian			
Toronto Centre	Susan Wallace	2008 candidate in Willowdale	F	Toronto	Trade Union Consultant	TBD	TBD	TBD
Toronto—Danforth	Jack Layton	Current Member of Parliament and Leader of the NDP	M	Toronto	Parliamentarian			
Trinity—Spadina	Olivia Chow	Current Member of Parliament; Wife of leader Jack Layton	F	Toronto	Parliamentarian			
Vaughan	Mark Pratt		M					
Welland	Malcolm Allen	Current Member of Parliament	M	Fenwick	Electrician			
Wellington—Halton Hills	Anastasia Zavarella		F		Student			
Whitby—Oshawa	Trish McAuliffe		F	Whitby	Retired auto worker			
Willowdale	Mehdi Mollahasani		M	North York	Student			
Windsor—Tecumseh	Joe Comartin	Incumbent MP	M	Windsor	Parliamentarian	TBD	TBD	TBD
Windsor West	Brian Masse	Incumbent Member of Parliament	M	Windsor	Parliamentarian	TBD	TBD	TBD
York Centre	Nick Brownlee		M					
York—Simcoe	Michelle Smith		F					
York South—Weston	Mike Sullivan		M					
York West	Giulio Manfrini		M					

== Manitoba – 14 Seats ==
Riding	Candidate's Name	Notes	Gender	Residence	Occupation	Votes	%	Rank
Brandon—Souris	John Bouché	2008 candidate in this riding.	M	Brandon	Locomotive Engineer			
Charleswood—St. James—Assiniboia	Tom Paulley		M	Winnipeg	Retired correctional officer			
Churchill	Niki Ashton	Incumbent MP	F	Thompson	Instructor	TBD	TBD	TBD
Dauphin—Swan River—Marquette	Cheryl Osborne	Former town councillor in Roblin	F	Roblin	Health liaison			
Elmwood—Transcona	Jim Maloway	Incumbent MP and former MLA	M	Winnipeg	Small business person	TBD	TBD	TBD
Kildonan—St. Paul	Rachelle Devine		F	Winnipeg				
Portage—Lisgar	Mohamed Alli	2008 Candidate	M		Labour unionist			
Provencher	Al Mackling	Former Provincial Cabinet Minister	M					
Saint Boniface	Patrice Miniely		F		Constituency assistant			
Selkirk—Interlake	Sean Palsson							
Winnipeg Centre	Pat Martin	Incumbent MP	M	Winnipeg	TBD	TBD	TBD	
Winnipeg North	Rebecca Blaikie		F					
Winnipeg South	Dave Gaudreau		M					
Winnipeg South Centre	Dennis Lewycky		M					

== Saskatchewan – 14 seats ==
Riding	Candidate's Name	Notes	Gender	Residence	Occupation	Votes	%	Rank
Battlefords—Lloydminster	Glenn Tait	NFU Board member, Farmer	M					
Blackstrap	Darien Moore		F	Saskatoon				
Cypress Hills—Grasslands	Trevor Peterson		M					
Desnethé—Missinippi—Churchill River	Lawrence Joseph		M					
Palliser	Noah Evanchuk		M	Regina	Lawyer			
Prince Albert	Valerie Mushinski	2006 and 2008 candidate in this riding	F	Nipawin	CEO / Administrator			
Regina—Lumsden—Lake Centre	Brian Sklar		M					
Regina—Qu'Appelle	Fred Clipsham	City Councillor	M					
Saskatoon—Humboldt	Denise Kouri		F	Saskatoon	Community activist	TBD	TBD	TBD
Saskatoon—Rosetown—Biggar	Nettie Wiebe	2004 candidate in Saskatoon—Humboldt; 2006 and 2008 candidate in this riding	F	Delisle	Farmer	TBD	TBD	TBD
Saskatoon—Wanuskewin	John Parry	Former MP for Kenora—Rainy River (1984–1988) Candidate for Saint Boniface in 2000 and 2002 by-election	M	Saskatoon	Accountant			
Souris—Moose Mountain	Allan Arthur	Former Mayor of Qu'Appelle (2006–2009)	M	Qu'Appelle	Coffee servicer			
Wascana	Mark Spooner		M	Regina	University Professor			
Yorkton—Melville	Doug Ottenbreit		M	Melville	Lawyer			

== Alberta – 28 seats ==
Riding	Candidate's Name	Notes	Gender	Residence	Occupation	Votes	%	Rank
Calgary Centre	Donna Montgomery		F			7,314	14.9	3
Calgary Centre-North	Paul Vargis		M			8,030	15.9	2
Calgary East	Al Brown		M			4,894	14.1	2
Calgary Northeast	Collette Singh		F			4,252	10.3	3
Calgary—Nose Hill	Colin Anderson		M			7,167	12.5	2
Calgary Southeast	Kirk Oates	Union representative	M			6,493	10.3	2
Calgary Southwest	Holly Heffernan	2006 and 2008 Candidate in this riding	F	Calgary	Nurse	6,823	11.9	2
Calgary West	Shauna Knowles		F			6,679	10.4	3
Crowfoot	Ellen Parker	2004, 2006 and 2008 candidate in this riding.	F	Camrose	Educator	4,805	9.1	2
Edmonton Centre	Lewis Cardinal	Brother of actor Lorne Cardinal of Corner Gas fame.	M	Edmonton	Human rights activist and small business owner	12,634	25.7	2
Edmonton East	Ray Martin	2008 candidate in same riding, former MLA	M	Edmonton	Former MLA and Provincial NDP Leader	17,099	37.5	2
Edmonton—Leduc	Artem Medvedev		M	Edmonton	Educator	11,478	20.3	2
Edmonton—Mill Woods—Beaumont	Nadine Bailey	Tour operator	F			10,875	23.8	2
Edmonton—St. Albert	Brian Labelle		M			11,644	21.4	2
Edmonton—Sherwood Park	Mike Scott	City of Edmonton Employee	M			7,971	14.5	3
Edmonton—Spruce Grove	Catherine Chaulk-Stokes		F			9,272	15.8	2
Edmonton—Strathcona	Linda Duncan	Incumbent MP	F	Edmonton	Environmental Law Consultant and Parliamentarian	26,093	53.5	1
Fort McMurray—Athabasca	Berend Wilting	Custodial Worker	M			4,101	13.1	2
Lethbridge	Mark Sandilands	2008 candidate in this riding.	M	Lethbridge	Retired Professor	13,097	27.2	2
Macleod	Janine Giles		F			5,334	10.3	2
Medicine Hat	Dennis Perrier		M			5,616	13.1	2
Peace River	Jennifer Villebrun	2008 Green Party Candidate in this riding	F	Valleyview	Lawyer	7,740	16.1	2
Red Deer	Stuart Somerville	2008 Candidate in this riding	M			7,478	14.9	2
Vegreville—Wainwright	Ray Stone	Retired	M			5,561	11.3	2
Westlock—St. Paul	Lyndsay Henderson		F			5,096	12.2	2
Wetaskiwin	Tim Robson		M			5,267	11.4	2
Wild Rose	Jeff Horvath	2004 and 2008 candidate in this riding	M	Canmore	Teacher	6,603	11.3	2
Yellowhead	Mark Wells	Law Student	M			5,383	13.1	2

== British Columbia – 36 seats ==
Riding	Candidate's Name	Notes	Gender	Residence	Occupation	Votes	%	Rank
Abbotsford	David Murray		M					
British Columbia Southern Interior	Alex Atamanenko	Current Member of Parliament	M	Castlegar	Teacher			
Burnaby—Douglas	Kennedy Stewart	SFU Professor	M					
Burnaby—New Westminster	Peter Julian	Current Member of Parliament	M	New Westminster	Parliamentarian			
Cariboo—Prince George	Jon Van Barneveld	Fourth year forestry student at the University of Northern British Columbia	M	Prince George	Junior Forester			
Chilliwack—Fraser Canyon	Gwen O'Mahony	Federal Candidate since April 2010	F		Community Social Worker			
Delta—Richmond East	Nick Slater		M	Whistler	Businessman			
Esquimalt—Juan de Fuca	Randall Garrison	2004 and 2006 NDP Candidate in this riding	M					
Fleetwood—Port Kells	Nao Fernando	2008 candidate in this riding	M	Surrey	Employment Relations Officer			
Kamloops—Thompson—Cariboo	Michael Crawford	2006 and 2008 candidate in this riding	M	Kamloops	Assistant Professor of Social Work			
Kelowna—Lake Country	Patricia Kalmanovitch		F					
Kootenay—Columbia	Mark Shmigelsky		M					
Langley	Piotr Majkowski							
Nanaimo—Alberni	Zeni Maartman	2008 candidate in this riding	F	Nanaimo	Insurance Manager – BCAA			
Nanaimo—Cowichan	Jean Crowder	Member of Parliament	F					
Newton—North Delta	Jinny Sims	Former President of BC Teachers' Federation	F					
New Westminster—Coquitlam	Fin Donnelly		M	Coquitlam	Environmental activist	TBD	TBD	TBD
North Vancouver	Michael Charrois		M					
Okanagan—Coquihalla	David Finnis		M					
Okanagan—Shuswap	Nikki Inouye		F					
Pitt Meadows—Maple Ridge—Mission	Craig Spears	Maple Ridge City Councillor	M					
Port Moody—Westwood—Port Coquitlam	Mark Ireland		M		Senior product specialist			
Prince George—Peace River	Lois Boone	Former MLA and School District Trustee	F	Prince George	Teacher			
Richmond	Dale Jackaman		M					
Saanich—Gulf Islands	Edith Loring-Kuhanga		F					
Skeena—Bulkley Valley	Nathan Cullen	Incumbent Member of Parliament	M	Smithers	Parliamentarian			
South Surrey—White Rock—Cloverdale	Susan Keeping		F					
Surrey North	Jasbir Sandhu		M	Surrey	Program Coordinator			
Vancouver Centre	Karen Shillington		F	Vancouver	Telephone researcher			
Vancouver East	Libby Davies	Current Member of Parliament	F	Vancouver	Parliamentarian			
Vancouver Island North	Ronna-Rae Leonard	Courtenay City Councillor						
Vancouver Kingsway	Don Davies	Current Member of Parliament	M	Vancouver	Lawyer			
Vancouver Quadra	Victor Elkins							
Vancouver South	Meena Wong		F					
Victoria	Denise Savoie	Current Member of Parliament	F	Victoria	Educator			
West Vancouver—Sunshine Coast—Sea to Sky Country	Bill Forst	2008 candidate in this riding	M	Gibsons	Retired teacher			

== Yukon – 1 seat ==
Riding	Candidate's Name	Notes	Gender	Residence	Occupation	Votes	%	Rank
Yukon	Kevin Barr		M			2,308	14.37	4

== Northwest Territories – 1 seat ==
Riding	Candidate's Name	Notes	Gender	Residence	Occupation	Votes	%	Rank
Western Arctic	Dennis Bevington	Current Member of Parliament	M	Fort Smith	Business Person	7,140	45.85	1

== Nunavut – 1 seat ==
Riding	Candidate's Name	Notes	Gender	Residence	Occupation	Votes	%	Rank
Nunavut	Jack Hicks		M	Iqaluit	Social science researchers	1,525	19.37	3

== See also ==
- Results of the Canadian federal election, 2011
- Results by riding for the Canadian federal election, 2011
