= David Laird (disambiguation) =

David Laird was a Canadian politician.

David Laird may also refer to:

- David Allen Laird, soil scientist
- Davie Laird, Scottish footballer
- David Carter Laird
- David Laird, co-founder of Kitson & Co.
