= Canadian House of Commons Standing Committee on Canadian Heritage =

Standing committee of the House of Commons of Canada

The Standing Committee on Canadian Heritage (CHPC) is a standing committee of the House of Commons of Canada. The Committee is currently chaired by Scott Simms, with Vice-Chairs Alain Rayes and Martin Champoux.

The Committee studies the policies and programs of the Department of Canadian Heritage and its portfolio, which are concerned with the fields of culture, heritage, and human rights in Canada.

== Mandate and activities ==
The Committee mandate includes:

- Review and study the policies and programs of the Department of Canadian Heritage and its agencies.
- Promote culture, the arts, heritage, audiovisual, sport, official languages, citizenship and participation as well as Aboriginal, youth and sport initiatives.

The Committee held four meetings during the 1st Session of the 43rd Parliament. On 13 March 2020, due to the COVID-19 pandemic, all scheduled committee meetings were cancelled. During the 42nd Parliament, the Committee undertook various studies, covering a range of subjects, including:

- the "impact of digital technology on the media in Canada;"
- the National Anthem;
- Remembrance Day;
- women and girls in sport;
- "systemic racism and religious discrimination in Canada;"
- the museum sector in Canada;
- cultural hubs and districts in Canada;
- gender parity on the "boards and senior leadership levels of Canadian artistic and cultural organizations;"
- Bill C-91, An Act respecting Indigenous languages;
- remuneration models for "artists and creative industries and Canada’s copyright regime;" and
- the online secondary ticket sales industry.

== History ==
Between 1979 and 1993, cultural issues were the responsibility of the Standing Committee on Communications and Culture. In 1993, cultural matters, including broadcasting, were moved to the new Department of Canadian Heritage, while responsibility for telecommunications was moved to Industry Canada. As result, in 1994, the House of Commons Standing Committee on Canadian Heritage was established.

Since then, the Committee’s mandate has gone through a couple changes. In 2003, responsibility for Parks Canada moved from Canadian Heritage to the Department of Environment. In fiscal year 2015–2016, the Multiculturalism Program transferred from Immigration, Refugees and Citizenship Canada to Canadian Heritage.

== Membership ==
As of the 45th Canadian Parliament:

Committee members, 2025-present
Party	Member	District
Liberal	Lisa Hepfner, Chair	Hamilton Mountain, ON
Liberal	Fares Al Soud	Mississauga Centre, ON
Liberal	David Myles	Fredericton—Oromocto, NB
Liberal	Bienvenu-Olivier Ntumba	Mont-Saint-Bruno—L'Acadie, QC
Liberal	Zoe Royer	Port Moody—Coquitlam, BC
Conservative	Rachael Thomas, Vice-Chair	Lethbridge, AB
Conservative	Bernard Généreux	Côte-du-Sud—Rivière-du-Loup—Kataskomiq—Témiscouata, QC
Conservative	Jamil Jivani	Durham, ON
Conservative	Kevin Waugh	Saskatoon South, SK
Bloc Québécois	Martin Champoux, Vice-Chair	Drummond, QC
