= Martin Champoux =

Canadian politician (born 1968)

Martin Champoux MP

Member of Parliament for Drummond
- Incumbent
- Assumed office October 21, 2019
- Preceded by: François Choquette

Personal details
- Born: May 3, 1968 (age 58) Quebec City, Quebec, Canada
- Party: Bloc Québécois
- Spouse: Caroline Lahaie

Martin Champoux MP (French pronunciation: [maʁtɛ̃ ʃɑ̃pu]; born May 3, 1968) is a Canadian politician. He was elected to the House of Commons of Canada in the 2019 federal election from Drummond as a member of the Bloc Québécois (BQ).

== Political career ==
He served as the critic of heritage, arts, culture, secularism, Quebec values and vivre-ensemble in the Bloc Québécois Shadow Cabinet of the 44th Parliament of Canada.

He was elected vice chair of the Canadian House of Commons Standing Committee on Canadian Heritage in the 45th Canadian Parliament.

== Electoral record ==
2025 Canadian federal election: Drummond
Party	Candidate	Votes	%	±%	Expenditures
Bloc Québécois	Martin Champoux	24,071	42.80	–3.82	$35,321.75
Liberal	Ghada Jerbi	15,998	28.45	+9.67	$10,525.86
Conservative	François Fréchette	12,790	22.74	+4.81	none listed
New Democratic	François Choquette	2,607	4.64	–6.51	$6,435.54
People's	William Trottier	773	1.37	N/A	$1,759.79
Total valid votes/expense limit		56,239	98.09	+0.55	$133,792.67
Total rejected ballots		1,095	1.91	–0.55	
Turnout		57,334	65.09		
Eligible voters		88,085			
Bloc Québécois hold		Swing		–6.75	
Source: Elections Canada
Note: number of eligible voters does not include voting day registrations.

2021 Canadian federal election: Drummond
Party	Candidate	Votes	%	±%	Expenditures
Bloc Québécois	Martin Champoux	23,866	46.62	+1.80	$25,502.47
Liberal	Mustapha Berri	9,614	18.78	+1.36	$7,431.67
Conservative	Nathalie Clermont	9,179	17.93	+1.36	$26,169.29
New Democratic	François Choquette	5,709	11.15	-4.75	$2,464.36
Free	Josée Joyal	1,728	3.38	–	$737.73
Animal Protection	Lucas Munger	674	1.32	+0.86	$6,472.17
No affiliation	Sylvain Marcoux	419	0.82	–	$1,820.27
Total valid votes/expense limit		51,189	97.54	–	$114,998.66
Total rejected ballots		1,289	2.46	–	
Turnout		52,478	61.33	-5.22	
Registered voters		85,569			
Bloc Québécois hold		Swing		+0.22	
Source: Elections Canada

2019 Canadian federal election: Drummond
Party	Candidate	Votes	%	±%	Expenditures
Bloc Québécois	Martin Champoux	24,574	44.82	+22	$18,378.63
Liberal	William Morales	9,552	17.42	-9.1	$17,277.86
Conservative	Jessica Ebacher	9,086	16.57	-1.1	none listed
New Democratic	François Choquette	8,716	15.90	-14.6	none listed
Green	Frédérik Bernier	1,856	3.39	+1	$3,099.20
People's	Steeve Paquet	525	0.96		$2,460.77
Rhinoceros	Réal Batrhino	270	0.49		$2,215.01
Animal Protection	Lucas Munger	248	0.45		$2,484.77
Total valid votes/expense limit		54,824	97.99		
Total rejected ballots		1,126	2.01		
Turnout		55,950	66.55		
Eligible voters		84,074			
Bloc Québécois gain from New Democratic		Swing		+15.55	
Source: Elections Canada
