= Jean-Marie Boisvert =

Canadian politician

Member of the Canadian Parliament for Drummond
- In office 30 October 1972 – 7 July 1974
- Preceded by: Jean-Luc Pépin
- Succeeded by: Yvon Pinard

Personal details
- Born: 20 September 1939 (age 86) Drummondville, Quebec, Canada
- Party: Social Credit Party
- Spouse: Cécile Leclair
- Occupation: teacher

Jean-Marie Boisvert (born 20 September 1939) is a former Canadian politician and teacher. He was elected to the House of Commons of Canada in the 1972 election as a member of the Social Credit Party to represent the riding of Drummond. During his political career, he sat on various parliamentary committees including the Canadian House of Commons Standing Committee on Justice and Legal Affairs, Canadian House of Commons Special Committee on Trends in Food Prices, Canadian House of Commons Standing Committee on Justice and Legal Affairs and the Standing Joint Committee on the Library of Parliament.
