= Yvon Pinard =

Canadian politician

The Honourable Yvon Pinard PC

Federal Court of Canada
- Incumbent
- Assumed office 1984

Member of Parliament for Drummond
- In office 1974–1984
- Preceded by: Jean-Marie Boisvert
- Succeeded by: Jean-Guy Guilbault

Personal details
- Born: October 10, 1940 (age 85) Drummondville, Quebec

Yvon Pinard, PC (born October 10, 1940) is a judge and former Canadian politician.

Pinard was born the son of Jean-Jacques and Cécile Pinard and was educated at Immaculate Conception School in Drummondville. He then attended the Nicolet Seminary, winning the Lieutenant Governor Onésime Gagnon Medal for Academic Merit, and the Université de Sherbrooke, winning the Lieutenant Governor Paul Comtois Medal for Academic and Social Merit.

He was called to the bar of Quebec in 1964. He founded the Drummond Caisse d'Entraide Economique, involving himself with that organization as well as politics and hockey.

Pinard was first elected to the House of Commons of Canada in the 1974 election. He was the Liberal Party's Deputy Government House Leader from 1977 to 1978. He was Government House Leader and President of the Privy Council in the government of Prime Minister Pierre Trudeau from 1980 until June 1984 when he left politics to accept an appointment to the bench.

He has been a judge on the Federal Court of Canada and the Court Martial Appeal Court of Canada since leaving politics in 1984.

He married Renée Chaput in Richmond, Quebec in 1964 and has two daughters, Hélène and Andrée.
