= Roger Pomerleau =

Canadian politician and carpenter (1947–2023)

Member of Parliament for Drummond
- In office 2008–2011
- Preceded by: Pauline Picard
- Succeeded by: François Choquette

Member of Parliament for Anjou—Rivière-des-Prairies
- In office 1993–1997
- Preceded by: Jean Corbeil
- Succeeded by: Yvon Charbonneau

Personal details
- Born: June 7, 1947 Montreal, Quebec, Canada
- Died: December 21, 2023 (aged 76)
- Party: Bloc Québécois

Roger Pomerleau (June 7, 1947 – December 21, 2023) was a Canadian politician and carpenter. He served as a member of Parliament from 1993 to 1997 and again from 2008 to 2011.

Born in Montreal, Quebec, Pomerleau was elected in the Anjou—Rivière-des-Prairies riding under the Bloc Québécois party in the 1993 federal election, thus serving in the 35th Canadian Parliament. He was defeated by Liberal candidate Yvon Charbonneau in the 1997 federal election. He returned to the House of Commons as a Bloc Québécois member following the 2008 federal election in which he won the Drummond electoral district. In the 2011 federal election Pomerleau was defeated by New Democratic Party candidate François Choquette.

Pomerleau died on December 21, 2023, at the age of 76.
