= Jean Corbeil =

Canadian politician

The Honourable Jean Corbeil PC

Minister of Labour
- In office January 30, 1989 – April 21, 1991
- Prime Minister: Brian Mulroney
- Preceded by: Pierre Cadieux
- Succeeded by: Marcel Danis

Minister of Transport
- In office April 21, 1991 – November 3, 1993
- Prime Minister: Brian Mulroney; Kim Campbell
- Preceded by: Doug Lewis
- Succeeded by: Doug Young

Member of Parliament for Anjou—Rivière-des-Prairies
- In office 1988–1993
- Preceded by: Riding created
- Succeeded by: Roger Pomerleau

Personal details
- Born: January 7, 1934 Montreal, Quebec, Canada
- Died: June 25, 2002 (aged 68)
- Party: Progressive Conservative
- Cabinet: Minister of Labour (1989-1991); Minister of Transport (1991-1993)

Jean Corbeil, PC (January 7, 1934 – June 25, 2002) was a Canadian politician.

Born in Montreal, Quebec, he was mayor of the city of Anjou from 1973 to 1988. In 1987-1988 he served a term as chairman of the Federation of Canadian Municipalities. In the 1988 federal election, he was elected to the House of Commons of Canada as a Progressive Conservative in the riding of Anjou—Rivière-des-Prairies.

He served in the Cabinets of Prime Ministers Brian Mulroney and Kim Campbell as Minister of Labour from 1989 to 1991, Minister of State (Transport) from 1990 to 1991, and Minister of Transport from 1991 to 1993. He was defeated in the 1993 and 1997 elections.

== Electoral record (partial) ==
1993 Canadian federal election: Honoré-Mercier
Party	Candidate	Votes	%	±%	Expenditures
Bloc Québécois	Roger Pomerleau	26,163	43.10		$31,453
Liberal	Normand Biron	25,631	42.22	+9.51	$40,059
Progressive Conservative	Jean Corbeil	7,066	11.64	−39.90	$53,776
New Democratic	Zamba Mandala	958	1.58	−10.98	$1,781
Natural Law	Gilles Raymond	747	1.23		$2,220
Commonwealth of Canada	Frantz-Albert Mitton	139	0.23		$0
Total valid votes		60,704	100.00		
Total rejected ballots		2,053			
Turnout		62,757	78.90		
Electors on the lists		79,535			
Source: Thirty-fifth General Election, 1993: Official Voting Results, Published by the Chief Electoral Officer of Canada. Financial figures taken from the official contributions and expenses submitted by the candidates, provided by Elections Canada.

1988 Canadian federal election: Honoré-Mercier
Party	Candidate	Votes	%	±%	Expenditures
Progressive Conservative	Jean Corbeil	27,451	51.54		$43,927
Liberal	Vincent Arciresi	17,421	32.71	–	$39,082
New Democratic	Vincent Marchione	6,687	12.56		$11,055
Green	Mario Paul	1,217	2.29		$0
Marxist–Leninist	Catherine Commandeur	483	0.91		$130
Total valid votes		53,259	100.00		
Total rejected ballots		1,338			
Turnout		54,597	74.02		
Electors on the lists		73,763			
Source: Report of the Chief Electoral Officer, Thirty-fourth General Election, 1988.
