= François Choquette =

Canadian politician (born 1974)

Member of Parliament for Drummond
- In office May 2, 2011 – September 11, 2019
- Preceded by: Roger Pomerleau
- Succeeded by: Martin Champoux

Personal details
- Born: January 3, 1974 (age 52) Granby, Quebec, Canada
- Party: New Democratic Party
- Profession: Teacher, politician

François Choquette (French pronunciation: [fʁɑ̃swa ʃɔkɛt]; born January 3, 1974) is a Canadian politician who was elected to the House of Commons of Canada in the 2011 election and re-elected in 2015. He served in the 41st and 42nd Canadian Parliaments before losing his seat in 2019. He represented the electoral district of Drummond as a member of the New Democratic Party (NDP).

Prior to being elected, Choquette was a teacher. Choquette has a bachelor's degree in secondary education in French and history and a master's degree in literature.

Choquette also ran unsuccessfully in the 2006 federal election, and attempted a non-consecutive comeback in the 2021 election, in Drummond.

After the 2015 election, NDP leader Tom Mulcair appointed Choquette to be the NDP's critic for Official Languages in the 42nd Canadian Parliament. During the 42nd Parliament, Choquette sponsored a private member's bill (Bill C-203) that would require Supreme Court judges to be fluently bilingual in English and French. However, it was defeated with most Liberal and Conservative members voting against the bill.

At the time of the 2025 Canadian federal election, he lived in Drummondville.

== Electoral record ==
2025 Canadian federal election: Drummond
| Party | Candidate | Votes | % | ±% | Expenditures |
|---|---|---|---|---|---|
| Bloc Québécois | Martin Champoux | 24,071 | 42.80 | –3.82 | $35,321.75 |
| Liberal | Ghada Jerbi | 15,998 | 28.45 | +9.67 | $10,525.86 |
| Conservative | François Fréchette | 12,790 | 22.74 | +4.81 | none listed |
| New Democratic | François Choquette | 2,607 | 4.64 | –6.51 | $6,435.54 |
| People's | William Trottier | 773 | 1.37 | N/A | $1,759.79 |
| Total valid votes/expense limit | | 56,239 | 98.09 | +0.55 | $133,792.67 |
| Total rejected ballots | | 1,095 | 1.91 | –0.55 | |
| Turnout | | 57,334 | 65.09 | | |
| Eligible voters | | 88,085 | | | |
| Bloc Québécois hold | | Swing | | –6.75 | |
Source: Elections Canada
Note: number of eligible voters does not include voting day registrations.

2021 Canadian federal election: Drummond
| Party | Candidate | Votes | % | ±% | Expenditures |
|---|---|---|---|---|---|
| Bloc Québécois | Martin Champoux | 23,866 | 46.62 | +1.80 | $25,502.47 |
| Liberal | Mustapha Berri | 9,614 | 18.78 | +1.36 | $7,431.67 |
| Conservative | Nathalie Clermont | 9,179 | 17.93 | +1.36 | $26,169.29 |
| New Democratic | François Choquette | 5,709 | 11.15 | -4.75 | $2,464.36 |
| Free | Josée Joyal | 1,728 | 3.38 | – | $737.73 |
| Animal Protection | Lucas Munger | 674 | 1.32 | +0.86 | $6,472.17 |
| No affiliation | Sylvain Marcoux | 419 | 0.82 | – | $1,820.27 |
| Total valid votes/expense limit | | 51,189 | 97.54 | – | $114,998.66 |
| Total rejected ballots | | 1,289 | 2.46 | – | |
| Turnout | | 52,478 | 61.33 | -5.22 | |
| Registered voters | | 85,569 | | | |
| Bloc Québécois hold | | Swing | | +0.22 | |
Source: Elections Canada

2019 Canadian federal election: Drummond
| Party | Candidate | Votes | % | ±% | Expenditures |
|---|---|---|---|---|---|
| Bloc Québécois | Martin Champoux | 24,574 | 44.82 | +22 | $18,378.63 |
| Liberal | William Morales | 9,552 | 17.42 | -9.1 | $17,277.86 |
| Conservative | Jessica Ebacher | 9,086 | 16.57 | -1.1 | none listed |
| New Democratic | François Choquette | 8,716 | 15.90 | -14.6 | none listed |
| Green | Frédérik Bernier | 1,856 | 3.39 | +1 | $3,099.20 |
| People's | Steeve Paquet | 525 | 0.96 | | $2,460.77 |
| Rhinoceros | Réal Batrhino | 270 | 0.49 | | $2,215.01 |
| Animal Protection | Lucas Munger | 248 | 0.45 | | $2,484.77 |
| Total valid votes/expense limit | | 54,824 | 97.99 | | |
| Total rejected ballots | | 1,126 | 2.01 | | |
| Turnout | | 55,950 | 66.55 | | |
| Eligible voters | | 84,074 | | | |
| Bloc Québécois gain from New Democratic | | Swing | | +15.55 | |
Source: Elections Canada

2015 Canadian federal election: Drummond
| Party | Candidate | Votes | % | ±% | Expenditures |
|---|---|---|---|---|---|
| New Democratic | François Choquette | 15,833 | 30.5 | -21.1 | $46,839.41 |
| Liberal | Pierre Côté | 13,793 | 26.5 | +18.1 | $17,306.35 |
| Bloc Québécois | Diane Bourgeois | 11,862 | 22.8 | +0.8 | $34,502.97 |
| Conservative | Pascale Déry | 9,221 | 17.7 | +1.8 | $58,680.41 |
| Green | Émile Coderre | 1,270 | 2.4 | +0.3 | – |
| Total valid votes/Expense limit | | 51,979 | 100.0 | | $217,456.41 |
| Total rejected ballots | | 1,098 | – | – | |
| Turnout | | 53,077 | – | – | |
| Eligible voters | | 81,303 | | | |
| New Democratic hold | | Swing | | -19.6 | |
Source: Elections Canada

2011 Canadian federal election: Drummond
| Party | Candidate | Votes | % | ±% | Expenditures |
|---|---|---|---|---|---|
| New Democratic | François Choquette | 24,489 | 51.6 | +34.8 | |
| Bloc Québécois | Roger Pomerleau | 10,410 | 22.0 | -16.8 | |
| Conservative | Normand W. Bernier | 7,555 | 15.9 | -9.4 | |
| Liberal | Pierre Côté | 3,979 | 8.4 | -8.4 | |
| Green | Robin Fortin | 987 | 2.1 | -0.4 | |
| Total valid votes/Expense limit | | 47,420 | 100.0 | | |
| Total rejected ballots | | 878 | 1.82 | -0.38 | |
| Turnout | | 48,298 | 62.59 | – | |
| Eligible voters | | 77,162 | – | – | |

2006 Canadian federal election: Drummond
| Party | Candidate | Votes | % | ±% | Expenditures |
|---|---|---|---|---|---|
| Bloc Québécois | Pauline Picard | 22,575 | 49.7 | -6.6 | $38,371 |
| Conservative | Jean-Marie Pineault | 10,134 | 22.3 | +5.4 | $51,057 |
| Liberal | Éric Cardinal | 7,437 | 16.4 | -6.4 | $75,543 |
| New Democratic | François Choquette | 2,870 | 6.3 | +4.5 | $1,903 |
| Green | Jean-Benjamin Milot | 2,418 | 5.3 | +3.1 | $865 |
| Total valid votes/Expense limit | | 45,434 | 100.0 | $76,054 | |
