= Éric St-Pierre =

Canadian politician

Éric St-Pierre MP
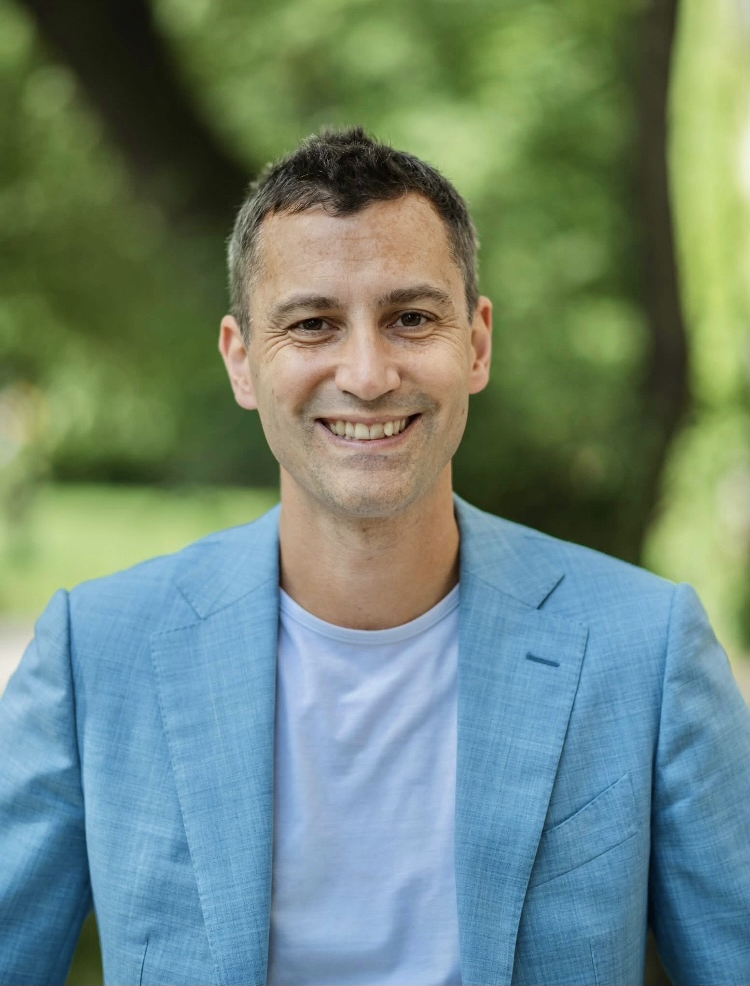

Member of Parliament for Honoré-Mercier
- Incumbent
- Assumed office April 28, 2025
- Preceded by: Pablo Rodríguez

Personal details
- Born: Quebec City
- Party: Liberal
- Education: Concordia University; McGill University
- Website: https://ericstpierre.ca/

Éric St-Pierre is a Canadian politician and lawyer who has served as the member of Parliament for the riding of Honoré-Mercier since 2025. A member of the Liberal Party, he previously served as executive director of the Trottier Family Foundation and practiced Indigenous and environmental law.

== Education and legal career ==
St-Pierre holds a dual law degree in civil law and common law from McGill University, and a political science degree from Concordia University. He was called to the Quebec Bar in 2012 and practiced Indigenous and environmental law for five years as a litigator and mediator.

== Career ==
From 2016 to 2025, St-Pierre served as the executive director of the Trottier Family Foundation, a non-profit organization based in Montreal, Canada, that manages and funds climate change-related projects. During his tenure, the foundation shifted its assets towards sustainable investing, expanded its grants to registered charities, and supported initiatives to advance the transition to a low-carbon economy. He worked with the City of Montreal and Mayor Valérie Plante on developing Montreal's carbon-neutral climate action plan, which included a commitment to reduce carbon emissions by 55 percent. The Trottier Family Foundation also supported this initiative by contributing to the creation of the Montreal Climate Partnership, which engaged civil society in the new climate plan.

St-Pierre is a co-founder of Low Carbon Cities Canada (LC3) and the Greater Montréal Climate Fund, and previously he held positions on the Board of Environment Funders Canada and as co-chair of the Montreal Climate Partnership. In March 2022, he organized the Great Canadian ESG Championship, a competition funded by Canadian charitable foundations to promote sustainable investing. He spoke at COP28.

In 2024, St-Pierre helped mobilize $405 million for Canadian climate philanthropy.

== Political career ==
In 2025, St-Pierre was nominated as the Liberal Party of Canada candidate for the riding of Honoré-Mercier in the 2025 Canadian federal election, which he went on to win.

=== Committee work ===
St-Pierre serves on the Standing Committee on Environment and Sustainable Development and the Standing Committee on Natural Resources.

=== Climate change ===
St-Pierre helped form an environmental caucus within the Liberal Party to discuss climate policy. In September 2025, he introduced Motion M-19, calling on the government to designate the first Wednesday of October as National Energy Efficiency Day. He also introduced a caucus motion on 'Energy Efficiency as a Nation Building Project,' which was adopted at the Liberal Party of Canada National Convention in April 2026.

St-Pierre introduced Motion M-34, calling for alignment of Canada's financial system with climate commitments.

=== Sports and politics ===
St-Pierre has participated in several athletic fundraising and awareness events with fellow MPs. In 2025, he ran a half-marathon with other MPs to mark Canada Day, and, in 2026, he organized a 2,000-push-up challenge in support of the Canadian Mental Health Association. In 2026, he ran two half-marathons dressed as the Peace Tower.

=== Charitable work ===
He championed the concept of creating a National Day of recognition for the non-profit sector.

== Personal life ==
St-Pierre resides in Montreal with his wife, Sylvie Trottier, and their two children. He is a long-distance runner and has completed several marathons and ultramarathons.

== Awards and recognition ==
St-Pierre's work on climate action and philanthropy has earned him several accolades.

In 2020, he was awarded the Honorary Scarlet Key Society award at McGill University.

In 2021, he was awarded the Canadian Climate Champion Award.

In 2022, he was recognized as a Clean50 honoree.

In 2022, he received the Lawyer of the Year award from the Jeune Barreau de Montréal in the alternative career category.

In 2025, he received the King Charles III Coronation Medal.

== Electoral record ==
2025 Canadian federal election: Honoré-Mercier
Party	Candidate	Votes	%	±%	Expenditures
Liberal	Éric St-Pierre	29,947	60.16	+0.16	$79,172.08
Conservative	Ingrid Fernanda Megni	10,692	21.48	+10.94	$11,635.31
Bloc Québécois	Edline Henri	6,435	12.93	–3.35	$13,310.22
New Democratic	Djaouida Sellah	1,787	3.59	–3.73	$1,018.22
Green	Gaëtan Bérard	568	1.14	–0.36	$0.00
People's	Marie-Louise Beauchamp	351	0.71	–3.48	$0.00
Total valid votes		49,780	98.34	+0.31	$126,748.61
Total rejected ballots		838	1.66	–0.31	
Turnout		50,618	65.09		
Eligible voters		77,770			
Liberal notional hold		Swing		-5.39	
Source: Elections Canada
Note: number of eligible voters does not include voting day registrations.
