= Canada Periodical Fund =

Fund providing assistance to magazines

The Canada Periodical Fund (CPF) provides financial assistance to Canadian print magazines, print community newspapers (non-daily) and digital periodicals. It is a program of the Government of Canada.

== History ==
The CPF was introduced in 2009 under heritage minister James Moore, a member of the Harper government; it went into effect a year later. It was designed as a replacement for two existing programs: the Canada Magazine Fund (CMF), and the Publications Assistance Program (PAP), a subsidy on the delivery of Canadian periodicals which predated the Confederation of Canada. The fund was initially budgeted at $75.5 million annually, equivalent to the combined funding of the CMF and PAP, most of which was allocated to the publishers of Canadian magazines and non-daily newspapers.

Notable differences between the CPF and the funding previously provided through the CMF and PAP included:

- The amount any individual title could receive was capped at $1.5 million, affecting a few large magazines such as Maclean's.
- Only periodicals with an annual paid circulation of at least 5,000 were eligible for funding. This requirement was waived for titles published by certain minority groups. Its effect on small literary and arts magazines was particularly noted.
- Publications of "professional associations" were no longer eligible for funding. This rendered ineligible titles such as Canadian Medical Association Journal, which received around $650,000 in CMF and PAP funding in 2008–2009.

The amount of CPF funding is a function of a title's circulation, though the heritage department has declined to specify exactly how funding amounts are determined.

=== Expansion to legacy dailies under Trudeau ===
The fund was not expanded by Finance Minister Bill Morneau and Heritage Minister Pablo Rodriguez to include non-magazine news sources in autumn 2018, despite a proposal by newspaper industry association News Media Canada to do so, ostensibly in response to financial losses suffered by news outlets in Canada.

"A letter urging Parliament to act and addressed to Prime Minister Justin Trudeau" was issued in February 2019 "by an eclectic group of media outlets, including Postmedia, which owns the National Post, Torstar, which publishes the Toronto Star, SaltWire Network, and the CBC among others."

On 22 May 2019, details of a $595-million package of tax credits to aid newspapers were instead announced by Rodriguez.

Eight organisations administer the aid and "define and promote core journalism standards (and) define professional journalism": News Media Canada, the Association de la presse francophone, the Quebec Community Newspaper Association, the National Ethnic Press and Media Council of Canada, the Canadian Association of Journalists, the Fédération professionnelle des journalistes du Québec, the Unifor union, and the Fédération nationale des communications.

In order to qualify for the fund "60 per cent of the content must be written" and "50 per cent of a news outlet’s content must be original news content". Should the CRA question the eligibility of a subsidy beneficiary, a "Second Panel of journalism experts from post-secondary institutions" would consult.

In June 2018, columnist Christie Blatchford (doyenne with a 48-year career in journalism), had said of a rumoured press subsidy: "God forbid Ottawa should start to subsidize newspapers too. As a journalist, the thought gives me the shudders." Former Ottawa Citizen editor Andrew Potter in May 2019 called the "Liberals' bailout package... a toxic initiative." Among other points, he identified "a newspaper industry lobby group" who had begged the government for three years, as indeed Terence Corcoran had already remarked in February 2016.

A proposal for a "National Press Council" had been formally written in 2009 by the head of the Ontario Human Rights Commission (and former Mayor of Toronto) Barbara Hall, and indeed elements of the Hall proposal were seen in the Rodriguez legislation.

As Corcoran had it, "The first battles against government control were fought centuries ago in England over Licencing of the Press laws and other variations on measures that limited press freedom. The fight was waged by the likes of John Milton, John Locke and John Stuart Mill. The result became known as the libertarian theory of the press. In Four Theories of the Press, a classic 1950s book once on reading lists in journalism schools, Fredrick Siebert summarized the theory. “Let all with something to say be free to express themselves. The true and sound will survive. The false and unsound will be vanquished. Government should keep out of the battle and not weigh the odds in favour of one side or the other.”" Some Canadian politicians saw it differently as far back as 1969 Davey Special Committee on Mass Media. The 1981 Kent Royal Commission on Newspapers supplemented Davey. "It proposed a Press Ownership Review Board that would issue licences and guidelines, provide direct funding for newspapers and publications, creating a CBC-like structure of subsidies and government interference “to supplement the privately owned media” which, the Davey commission concluded, were a menace to a democratic society." By contrast, Corcoran values "a free press that is not under any kind of control or influence from government."

An implementation of the "social responsibility theory" of the press was the gift of Rodriguez.
