= Fayçal El-Khoury =

Canadian politician (born 1955)

Fayçal El-Khoury MP

Member of Parliament for Laval—Les Îles
- Incumbent
- Assumed office October 19, 2015
- Preceded by: François Pilon

Personal details
- Born: May 15, 1955 (age 71) Charbila, Lebanon
- Party: Liberal
- Education: Concordia University
- Profession: Engineer, consultant
- Website: https://faycalelkhoury.liberal.ca/

Fayçal El-Khoury MP (born May 15, 1955) is a Canadian Liberal politician of Lebanese descent, who was elected to represent the riding of Laval—Les Îles in the House of Commons of Canada in the 2015 federal election, El-Khoury won with 47.7% of the vote. He holds an engineering degree from Concordia University. El-Khoury immigrated to Canada from Lebanon in 1976.

El-Khoury holds dual-citizenship with Lebanon.

== Electoral record ==
2025 Canadian federal election: Laval—Les Îles
Party	Candidate	Votes	%	±%	Expenditures
Liberal	Fayçal El-Khoury	28,302	49.73	+0.80	$74,280.82
Conservative	Konstantinos Merakos	18,355	32.25	+14.54	$65,478.47
Bloc Québécois	Catherine Dansereau-Redhead	8,298	14.58	–4.50	$8,392.32
New Democratic	Étienne Loiselle-Schiettekatte	1,961	3.45	–4.24	$1,781.12
Total valid votes/expense limit		56,916	98.69	–	$132,821.52
Total rejected ballots		758	1.31		
Turnout		57,674	66.53		
Eligible voters		86,685			
Liberal hold		Swing		–6.87	
Source: Elections Canada
Note: number of eligible voters does not include voting day registrations.

2021 Canadian federal election
Party	Candidate	Votes	%	±%	Expenditures
Liberal	Fayçal El-Khoury	24,758	48.9	+0.7	
Bloc Québécois	Guillaume Jolivet	9,656	19.1	-1.5	
Conservative	Spyridonas Pettas	8,963	17.7	+1.4	
New Democratic	Rowan Woodmass	3,889	7.7	-1.2	
People's	Matthieu Couture	2,571	5.1	+3.4	
Green	Ahmed Taleb	760	1.5	-2.8	
Total valid votes		50,597	98.4		
Total rejected ballots		819	1.6		
Turnout		51,416	61.9		
Eligible voters		83,045			
Liberal hold		Swing		+1.1	
Source: Elections Canada

2019 Canadian federal election: Laval—Les Îles
Party	Candidate	Votes	%	±%	Expenditures
Liberal	Fayçal El-Khoury	26,031	48.2	+0.50	$93,691.28
Bloc Québécois	Nacera Beddad	11,120	20.6	+8.18	$1,900.53
Conservative	Tom Pentefountas	8,816	16.3	-1.80	none listed
New Democratic	Noémia Onofre De Lima	4,803	8.9	-10.87	none listed
Green	Sari Madi	2,306	4.3	+2.61	none listed
People's	Marie-Louise Beauchamp	885	1.7		$0.00
Total valid votes/expense limit		53,961	100.0		
Total rejected ballots		840			
Turnout		54,801	65.8		
Eligible voters		83,233			
Liberal hold		Swing		-3.84	
Source: Elections Canada

2015 Canadian federal election
Party	Candidate	Votes	%	±%	Expenditures
Liberal	Fayçal El-Khoury	25,857	47.70	+27.11	–
New Democratic	François Pilon	10,710	19.77	-27.87	–
Conservative	Roland Dick	9,811	18.10	+2.18	–
Bloc Québécois	Nancy Redhead	6,731	12.42	-0.60	–
Green	Faiza R'Guiba-Kalogerakis	919	1.69	-0.10	–
Marxist–Leninist	Yvon Breton	175	0.32	-0.04	–
Total valid votes/Expense limit		–	100.0		$217,963.44
Total rejected ballots		–	–	–	
Turnout		54,203	–	–	
Eligible voters		81,562			
Source: Elections Canada
