= Jean-Guy Guilbault =

Canadian politician (1931–2022)

Member of Parliament for Drummond
- In office 1984–1993
- Preceded by: Yvon Pinard
- Succeeded by: Pauline Picard

Personal details
- Born: 14 March 1931 Drummondville, Quebec, Canada
- Died: 4 March 2022 (aged 90) Bromont, Quebec, Canada
- Party: Progressive Conservative
- Profession: Businessman

Jean-Guy Guilbault (14 March 1931 – 4 March 2022) was a Canadian businessman and politician who was a member of the House of Commons of Canada.

Guilbault attended schools in Drummondville and Montreal. In federal politics, he represented the Quebec riding of Drummond where he was first elected in the 1984 federal election and re-elected in 1988, therefore becoming a member in the 33rd and 34th Canadian Parliaments. He was a member of the Progressive Conservative party.

Guilbault left federal politics after his defeat in the 1993 federal election to Pauline Picard of the Bloc Québécois. Guilbault died on 4 March 2022, at the age of 90.
