= Pablo Rodriguez (Canadian politician) =

Canadian politician (born 1967)

The Honourable Pablo Rodriguez PC
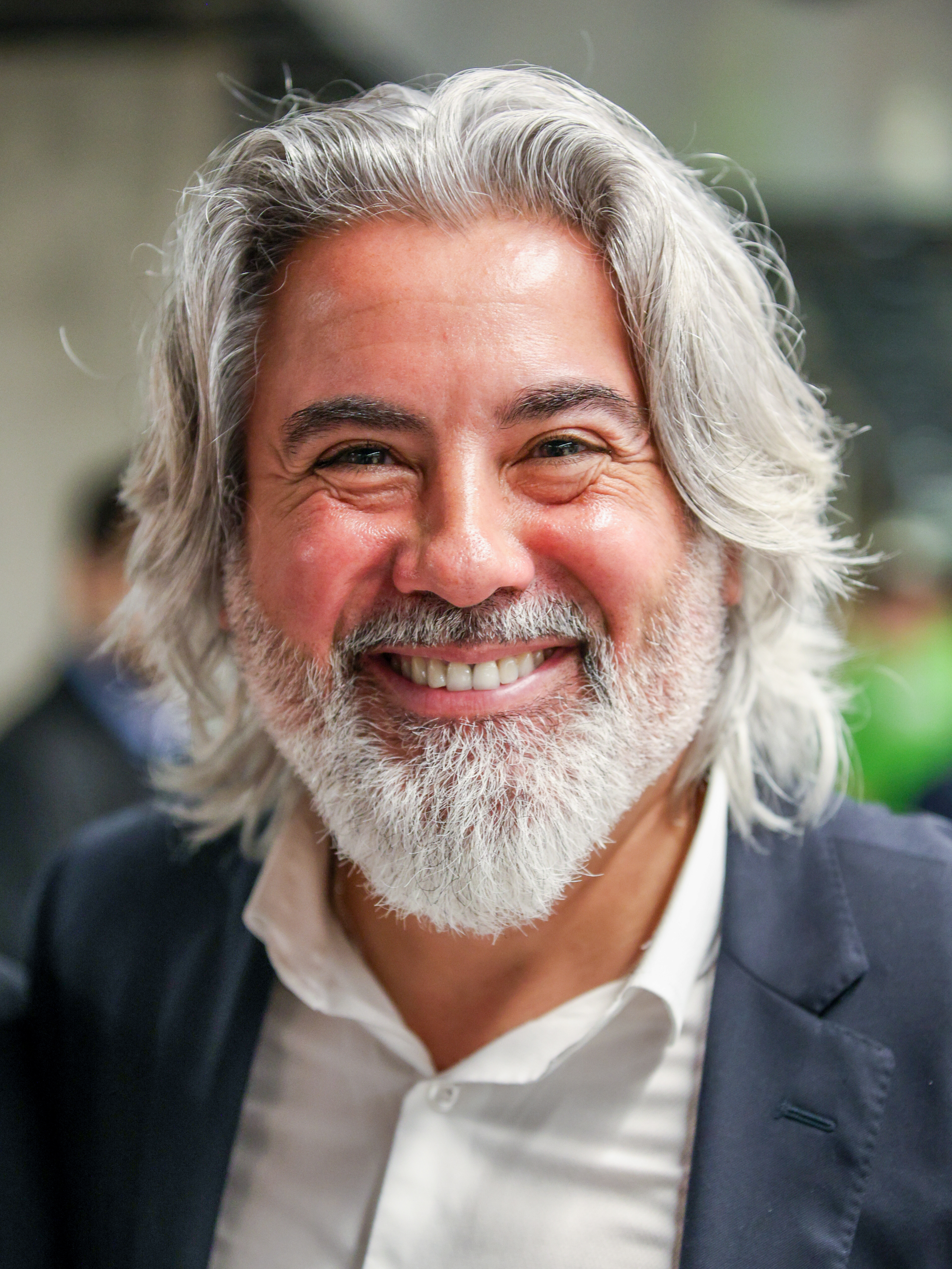
- Rodriguez in 2023

Leader of the Quebec Liberal Party
- In office June 14, 2025 – December 17, 2025
- President: Rafael Primeau Ferraro
- Preceded by: Marc Tanguay (interim)
- Succeeded by: Marc Tanguay (interim)
Federal ministerial positions
Minister of Transport
In office July 26, 2023 – September 19, 2024
Prime Minister	Justin Trudeau
Preceded by	Omar Alghabra
Succeeded by	Anita Anand
Minister of Canadian Heritage (Note: Titled as Canadian Heritage and Multiculturalism from 2018 to 2019)
In office October 26, 2021 – July 26, 2023
Prime Minister	Justin Trudeau
Preceded by	Steven Guilbeault
Succeeded by	Pascale St-Onge
In office July 18, 2018 – November 20, 2019
Prime Minister	Justin Trudeau
Preceded by	Mélanie Joly
Succeeded by	Steven Guilbeault (Canadian Heritage); Marco Mendicino (Multiculturalism)
Leader of the Government in the House of Commons
In office November 20, 2019 – October 26, 2021
Prime Minister	Justin Trudeau
Preceded by	Bardish Chagger
Succeeded by	Mark Holland
Chief Government Whip
In office January 30, 2017 – August 31, 2018
Prime Minister	Justin Trudeau
Preceded by	Andrew Leslie
Succeeded by	Mark Holland

Member of Parliament for Honoré-Mercier
- In office October 19, 2015 – January 20, 2025
- Preceded by: Paulina Ayala
- Succeeded by: Éric St-Pierre
- In office June 28, 2004 – May 2, 2011
- Preceded by: Yvon Charbonneau
- Succeeded by: Paulina Ayala

Personal details
- Born: June 21, 1967 (age 59) San Miguel de Tucumán, Argentina
- Party: Quebec Liberal
- Other political affiliations: Liberal; Independent (2024–2025)
- Spouse: Roxane Hardy
- Education: University of Sherbrooke (BBA)
- Profession: Communication consultant

Pablo Rodriguez (born June 21, 1967) is an Argentine-Canadian politician who served as the leader of the Quebec Liberal Party from June to December 2025. He previously served as the member of Parliament (MP) for Honoré-Mercier from 2015 to 2025, and before from 2004 to 2011, serving in various cabinet roles.

A member of the Liberal Party of Canada, Rodriguez previously served in the 29th Canadian Ministry as minister of Transport, minister of Canadian Heritage, the Government Chief Whip, and Leader of the Government in the House of Commons at various points from 2017 to 2024. Additionally, he was his party's Quebec lieutenant from 2019 until 2024.

Rodriguez resigned from the Cabinet and the federal Liberal caucus on September 19, 2024, to run for the leadership of the Quebec Liberal Party. He continued to sit as an MP until January 20, 2025, when the Quebec Liberal leadership campaign period began. He won the second round with 52.3% of the popular vote over Charles Milliard.

On December 18, 2025, Rodriguez resigned as leader in the middle of a political crisis in which it was alleged party members were financially rewarded for voting for him in the leadership race. Rodriguez was later cleared of any involvement in these allegations in August 2026. He has been hired as an on-air political analyst for CJAD, CTV News Montreal, and Noovo.

== Early life and career ==
Rodriguez was born on June 21, 1967, in San Miguel de Tucumán, Argentina. When he was eight, Rodriguez's family fled to Canada after their home was bombed during the Dirty War, and his father, who was running for governor in Argentina's Tucuman province, was repeatedly jailed and tortured for his activism. They initially stayed in Montreal, but moved to Sherbrooke, after his father obtained a teaching position at the University of Sherbrooke, where Rodriguez learned customs and cultural traditions of Quebec by learning French by playing hockey with friends and listening to songs of Paul Piché. He also was elected class president at Sherbrooke CEGEP.

Rodriguez was initially drawn to politics after his father took him to hear René Lévesque's victory speech in 1976. He joined the Quebec Liberal Party youth wing at age 16 eventually becoming vice-president serving alongside Mario Dumont. When Dumont left the youth commission, Rodriguez was one of the few members within the commission who stayed with the party. During the 1995 referendum campaign on Quebec independence, he was a youth spokesperson for the No camp. Rodriguez was the Past President of the Quebec wing of the Liberal Party of Canada.

Rodriguez has a degree in business administration from the University of Sherbrooke, worked in public affairs and international development for a Montreal-based NGO, Club 2/3. He was the Vice President of Oxfam Québec from 2000 to 2004 after it was merged with Club 2/3.

== Federal politics (2004–2025) ==
=== Opposition MP ===
Rodriguez was elected as a Liberal to the House of Commons of Canada for the Quebec riding of Honoré-Mercier in 2004, 2006 and 2008. For most of his first stint in Parliament, he was the only Liberal representing a riding in eastern Montreal, a longstanding stronghold for the Bloc Québecois.

Rodriguez was chair of the Standing Committee on Official Languages, the Official Opposition’s Critic for of the Francophonie and Official Languages, and Critic for Public Works and Government Services Canada. He has served on many committees of the House of Commons, including the Committee of Canadian Heritage, Official Languages and the Public Accounts Committee.

He was the Quebec Chair of Michael Ignatieff's candidacy in the 2006 Liberal Party of Canada leadership election.

On February 14, 2007, a bill Rodriguez put forward was passed by the Commons that would give the Conservative government 60 days to come up with a plan to respect Canada's engagements under the Kyoto Protocol.

==== Criminal charge ====
On April 16, 2010, Rodriguez was charged under the Criminal Code of Canada, after he collided his BMW with a parked car in Montreal. Police attending the crash reported Rodriguez had bloodshot eyes and alcohol on his breath, and during attempts to administer a breathalyzer test, Rodriguez "breathed very weakly and cut his breath repeatedly, all the while holding the plastic tip at the edge of his lips".

According to Rodriguez himself, "Because I'd consumed a moderate amount of wine during the previous supper, the police officer asked me to proceed with a breathalyzer test, using a hand-held machine, which I did without hesitation". Despite the criminal charge, Rodriguez remained in the Liberal caucus.

In the 2011 election he was defeated by the New Democratic Party's Paulina Ayala amid the New Democratic Party's surge in Quebec.

=== In government ===
After his defeat, Rodriguez where he headed Ecolomondo, a Montreal company that now specializes in the treatment of hydrocarbon-based waste. In 2013, he left the company after Justin Trudeau tasked him to rebuild the party in Quebec. Rodriguez, who was living off his Registered Retirement Savings Plan, travelled the province and recruited candidates for the 2015 election. He also sought a rematch with Ayala. Amid a Liberal surge almost as large as the NDP's surge four years earlier where the Liberals grew from their Quebec caucus from six members to 40 members, he defeated Ayala to return to Parliament.

==== 42nd Canadian Parliament ====
Rodriguez served as Chief Government Whip for a year and a half from January 30, 2017.

Rodriguez served in the 42nd Canadian Parliament as the Minister of Canadian Heritage from July 18, 2018 until dissolution of that government on November 20, 2019. One of his signature initiatives at Heritage was the expansion of the Canada Periodical Fund from magazine-format monthlies to daily broadsheets. This was announced in Bill Morneau's November 21, 2018 "fiscal update" as a $600-million fund over five years. The measure was widely applauded in the press "by an eclectic group of media outlets, including Postmedia, which owns the National Post, Torstar, which publishes the Toronto Star, SaltWire Network, and the CBC among others."

==== 43rd Canadian Parliament ====
Rodriguez was re-elected in the 2019 federal election.

From formation on November 20, 2019 until dissolution, Rodriguez served as Leader of the Government in the House of Commons.

==== 44th Canadian Parliament ====
After the 2021 election, Rodriguez was re-appointed as Minister of Canadian Heritage on October 26, 2021.

Rodriguez introduced the Online News Act, Bill C-18, An Act respecting online communications platforms that make news content available to persons in Canada. It received Royal Assent on June 22, 2023. The bill would force tech giants to compensate news organizations. The Trudeau government has dismissed the complaints of the tech giants will have to pay exorbitant amounts of money and would face uncapped liability based on how many links are posted.

In 2020, Steven Guilbeault, the Minister of Canadian Heritage at the time, proposed Bill C-10, however, due to suspension of parliament in 2021, and the call of an early election, permanently paused the bill. After Rodriguez became the Minister of Canadian Heritage, he proposed Bill C-11, the Online Streaming Act, An Act to amend the Broadcasting Act and to make related and consequential amendments to other Acts. C-11 later passed both the House of Commons and the Senate, receiving royal consent on April 27, 2023, and becoming law. C-11 amends the broadcasting act, created in 1968, by creating a framework that online broadcasters, such as Netflix, Disney+, and Spotify must follow. It expands the power of the Canadian Radio Television-Telecommunications Commission, or CRTC, giving the CRTC flexibility on how to do the regulations. The goal of C-11 is to promote Canadian Content, and extend its beliefs online. Proponents of C-11, such as Neal McDougall of TVO, argue that C-11 modernizes the ageing Broadcasting Act, ensuring online streamers and Canadian broadcasters play by the same rules, and promotes Canadian content and culture. However, C-11 has also been criticized, such as by Dr. Michael Geist, who argues multiple definitions were left undefined in C-11, including definitions on Canadian Content and mandated contributions.

On July 26, 2023, Rodriguez was appointed Minister of Transport.

== Provincial politics (2024–2025) ==
After weeks of speculation, Rodriguez announced on September 19, 2024, that he was resigning from the federal cabinet in order to run for the leadership of the Quebec Liberal Party, and would resign from the Liberal caucus to sit as an independent in order to have the flexibility to run his campaign as he saw fit. Rodriguez sat as an independent MP until officially entering the race and resigning his seat on January 20, 2025. He narrowly defeated Charles Milliard on the second ballot, becoming the first Hispanic to lead a provincial party in Quebec.

After winning the leadership, Rodriguez appointed MNA Marwah Rizqy as parliamentary leader. She was removed as leader by Rodriguez in November 2025, after Rizqy fired her chief of staff without consulting him. The same month, he served a legal notice to newspaper Le Journal de Montréal, after it reported that Quebec Liberal Party members were allegedly financially rewarded for voting for Rodriguez in the leadership election; he denied the accusations. The payments were reportedly nicknamed "brownies". The Unité permanente anticorruption confirmed that it opened an investigation in December 2025, and many former Liberal MNAs called for Rodriguez to resign.

He also removed Sona Lakhoyan Olivier from caucus after an ethics investigation was opened to inquire whether she used constituency office resources during the leadership race. After weeks of party turmoil, Rodriguez announced his resignation as party leader to his caucus on December 17, 2025, and to the public a day later. He is the shortest-serving leader in the party's history. In December 2025, the François Legault government passed legislation that banned vote buying in municipal and provincial leadership elections.

In August 2026, La Presse and Noovo Info both reported that the provincial anti-corruption police, Unité permanente anticorruption, and Élections Québec investigations had cleared Rodriguez, finding that he did not have any links to vote buying schemes. UPAC investigators also reportedly believed that the initial JdM report may have been part of setup targeting Rodriguez. While admitting that his political career is over, Rodriguez believes that the media should be reflective of the coverage by explaining the steps they took to ensure the accuracy of their information and suggested that Quebec Press Council should be more assertive of their complaints.

== Personal life ==
Rodriguez is married to his wife, Roxane and has a daughter. He is fluent in French, English, Spanish and is learning Italian.

== Electoral record ==
=== Leadership ===
2025 Quebec Liberal Party leadership election result
Candidate	Round 1		Runoff	
Candidate	Points	%	Points	%
Pablo Rodriguez	145,878	39	195,602	52.3
Charles Milliard	107,345	28.7	178,398	47.7
Karl Blackburn	103,265	27.6	Eliminated	
Marc Bélanger	14,659	3.9	Eliminated	
Mario Roy	2,853	0.8	Eliminated	
Total	374,000	100.00	374,000	100.00

=== Federal ===
2021 Canadian federal election: Honoré-Mercier
Party	Candidate	Votes	%	±%	Expenditures
Liberal	Pablo Rodríguez	29,033	60.0	+1.3	$39,670.10
Bloc Québécois	Charlotte Lévesque-Marin	7,908	16.3	-3.5	$3,008.90
Conservative	Guy Croteau	5,086	10.5	+0.9	$2,893.59
New Democratic	Paulina Ayala	3,537	7.3	-0.9	$433.46
People's	Lucilia Miranda	2,023	4.2	+3.3	$508.19
Green	Bianca Deltorto-Russell	734	1.5	-1.2	$0.00
Marxist–Leninist	Yves Le Seigle	88	0.2	+0.1	$0.00
Total valid votes/expense limit		48,409	98.0	–	$109,578.67
Total rejected ballots		971	2.0		
Turnout		49,380	64.1		
Registered voters		77,078			
Liberal hold		Swing		+2.4	
Source: Elections Canada

2019 Canadian federal election: Honoré-Mercier
Party	Candidate	Votes	%	±%	Expenditures
Liberal	Pablo Rodríguez	29,543	58.66	+2.11	$45,514.73
Bloc Québécois	Jacques Binette	9,979	19.81	+6.88	$7,951.83
Conservative	Guy Croteau	4,808	9.55	-2.5	$3,314.94
New Democratic	Chu Anh Pham	4,130	8.2	-8.21	none listed
Green	Domenico Cusmano	1,373	2.73	+1.15	none listed
People's	Patrick St-Onge	459	0.91	–	$2,885.14
Marxist–Leninist	Yves Le Seigle	71	0.14	-0.02	$0.00
Total valid votes/expense limit		50,363	100.0		
Total rejected ballots		1,013			
Turnout		51,376	65.4		
Eligible voters		78,549			
Liberal hold		Swing		-2.39	
Source: Elections Canada

2015 Canadian federal election: Honoré-Mercier
Party	Candidate	Votes	%	±%	Expenditures
Liberal	Pablo Rodriguez	29,211	56.55	+23.5	$53,622.10
New Democratic	Paulina Ayala	8,478	16.41	-18.81	$12,795.65
Bloc Québécois	Audrey Beauséjour	6,680	12.93	-3.07	$11,516.20
Conservative	Guy Croteau	6,226	12.05	-0.96	$3,697.33
Green	Angela Budilean	814	1.58	-0.03	–
Strength in Democracy	Dayana Dejean	168	0.33	–	–
Marxist–Leninist	Yves Le Seigle	81	0.16	-0.19	–
Total valid votes/Expense limit		51,658	100.0		$213,214.66
Total rejected ballots		682	–	–	
Turnout		52,340	–	–	
Eligible voters		78,428			
Liberal gain from New Democratic		Swing		+17.11	
Source: Elections Canada

2011 Canadian federal election: Honoré-Mercier
Party	Candidate	Votes	%	±%	Expenditures
New Democratic	Paulina Ayala	17,545	36.37	+26.26	
Liberal	Pablo Rodriguez	14,641	30.35	-13.32	
Bloc Québécois	Martin Laroche	8,935	18.52	-9.60	
Conservative	Gérard Labelle	5,992	12.42	-2.88	
Green	Gaëtan Bérard	770	1.60	-1.20	
Rhinoceros	Valery Chevrefils-Latulippe	181	0.38	–	
Marxist–Leninist	Jean-Paul Bédard	170	0.35	–	
Total valid votes		48,234	100.00		
Total rejected ballots		622	1.27	-0.06	
Turnout		48,856	59.98	-2.18	
New Democratic gain from Liberal		Swing		+19.79	

2008 Canadian federal election: Honoré-Mercier
Party	Candidate	Votes	%	±%	Expenditures
Liberal	Pablo Rodríguez	21,544	43.67	+5.44	$64,461
Bloc Québécois	Gérard Labelle	13,871	28.12	−6.71	$57,274
Conservative	Rodrigo Alfaro	7,549	15.30	−2.14	$35,152
New Democratic	François Pilon	4,986	10.11	+3.89	$1,499
Green	Gaëtan Bérard	1,380	2.80	−0.13	$1,387
Total valid votes		49,330	100.00		
Total rejected ballots		667	1.33		
Turnout		49,997	62.16	−2.71	
Electors on the lists		80,429			
Liberal hold		Swing		+6.08	
Source: Official Voting Results, 40th General Election 2008, Elections Canada.

2006 Canadian federal election: Honoré-Mercier
Party	Candidate	Votes	%	±%	Expenditures
Liberal	Pablo Rodríguez	19,622	38.23	−7.87	$62,095
Bloc Québécois	Gérard Labelle	17,879	34.83	−5.54	$39,105
Conservative	Angelo M. Marino	8,952	17.44	+11.42	$62,813
New Democratic	François Pilon	3,191	6.22	+2.13	$2,374
Green	Sylvain Castonguay	1,502	2.93	+1.16	not listed
Marxist–Leninist	Hélène Héroux	183	0.36	+0.02	none listed
Total valid votes		51,329	100.00		
Total rejected ballots		650	1.25		
Turnout		51,979	64.87	+3.23	
Electors on the lists		80,122			
Liberal hold		Swing		-1.17	
Source: Official Voting Results, 39th General Election, Elections Canada.

2004 Canadian federal election: Honoré-Mercier
Party	Candidate	Votes	%	±%	Expenditures
Liberal	Pablo Rodríguez	22,223	46.10	−11.76	$78,649
Bloc Québécois	Éric St-Hilaire	19,461	40.37	+10.02	$13,063
Conservative	Gianni Chiazzese	2,902	6.02	−2.28	$5,060
New Democratic	François Pilon	1,973	4.09	+2.81	$885
Green	Richard Lahaie	852	1.77	–	$0
Marijuana	Steve Boudrias	626	1.30	−0.59	none listed
Marxist–Leninist	Hélène Héroux	164	0.34	+0.03	none listed
Total valid votes		48,201	100.00		
Total rejected ballots		854	1.74		
Turnout		49,055	61.64		
Electors on the lists		79,585			
Note: Conservative vote is compared to the total of the Canadian Alliance vote and Progressive Conservative vote in 2000 election.
Source: Official Voting Results, Thirty-Eighth General Election, Elections Canada.
Liberal hold		Swing		-10.89	

== Notes ==
29th Canadian Ministry (2015–2025) – Cabinet of Justin Trudeau
Cabinet posts (4)
Predecessor	Office	Successor
Mélanie Joly	Minister of Canadian Heritage and Multiculturalism; July 18, 2018 – November 20, 2019	Steven Guilbeault (Canadian Heritage); Marco Mendicino (Multiculturalism)
Bardish Chagger	Leader of the Government in the House of Commons; November 20, 2019 – October 26, 2021	Mark Holland
Steven Guilbeault	Minister of Canadian Heritage; October 26, 2021 – July 26, 2023	Pascale St-Onge
Omar Alghabra	Minister of Transport; July 26, 2023 – September 19, 2024	Anita Anand
