= François Pilon =

Canadian politician (born 1958)

Member of Parliament for Laval—Les Îles
- In office May 2, 2011 – October 18, 2015
- Preceded by: Raymonde Folco
- Succeeded by: Fayçal El-Khoury

Personal details
- Born: August 25, 1958 (age 68) Laval, Quebec, Canada
- Party: New Democratic Party (federal); Parti Laval (local); Action Laval (local)
- Education: Collège Montmorency

François Pilon (French pronunciation: [fʁɑ̃swa pilɔ̃]; born August 25, 1958) is a Canadian politician who represented the Quebec riding of Laval—Les Îles in the House of Commons for one term from 2011 to 2015 as a member of the New Democratic Party (NDP).

== Background ==
Pilon was born in 1958 in Laval and has a background in architectural design. He is active in the labour movement, having served as vice-president of the Syndicat des Cols Bleus de la Ville de Laval from late 1998 to 2006. In 1999, he helped lead his union into the Canadian Union of Public Employees.

He was elected to the Canadian House of Commons on his fourth attempt, previously running in the riding of Honoré-Mercier, which the NDP also took in 2011.

He is not to be confused with another François Pilon who has run for the Green Party in Montreal.

== Electoral record ==
2017 Laval City Council Election: Laval-les-Îles District (17)
Party	Council candidate	Vote	%
Mouvement lavallois - Équipe Marc Demers	Nicholas Borne (X)	2,526	45.86
Parti Laval - Équipe Michel Trottier	François Pilon	1,138	20.66
Avenir Laval - Équipe Sonia Baudelot	Josée Trépanier	981	17.81
Action Laval - Équipe Jean Claude Gobé	Cesar Augusto Maldonado	676	12.27
Alliance des conseillers autonomes - Équipe Alain Lecompte et Cynthia Leblanc	Cynthia Leblanc	187	3.40

2015 Canadian federal election
Party	Candidate	Votes	%	±%	Expenditures
Liberal	Fayçal El-Khoury	25,857	47.70	+27.07	$86,424.50
New Democratic	François Pilon	10,710	19.77	-27.43	$29,014.20
Conservative	Roland Dick	9,811	18.10	+1.67	$114,413.09
Bloc Québécois	Nancy Redhead	6,731	12.42	-0.47	$19,952.32
Green	Faiza R'Guiba-Kalogerakis	919	1.69	-0.09	$2,605.36
Marxist–Leninist	Yvon Breton	175	0.32	-0.04	–
Total valid votes/Expense limit		–	100.0		$218,884.73
Total rejected ballots		–	–	–	
Turnout		54,203	–	–	
Eligible voters		81,562			
Source: Elections Canada

2011 Canadian federal election
Party	Candidate	Votes	%	±%	Expenditures
New Democratic	François Pilon	25,703	47.64	+36.18	
Liberal	Karine Joizil	11,108	20.59	-19.85	
Conservative	Zaki Ghavitian	8,587	15.92	-4.70	
Bloc Québécois	Mohamedali Jetha	7,022	13.02	-10.52	
Green	Brent Neil	966	1.79	-1.49	
Pirate	Stéphane Bakhos	369	0.68		
Marxist–Leninist	Polyvios Tsakanikas	194	0.36	–	
Total valid votes/Expense limit		53,949	100.00		
Total rejected ballots		702	1.28	-0.06	
Turnout		54,651	59.31	-2.38	

2008 Canadian federal election: Honoré-Mercier
Party	Candidate	Votes	%	±%	Expenditures
Liberal	Pablo Rodríguez	21,544	43.67	+5.44	$64,461
Bloc Québécois	Gérard Labelle	13,871	28.12	−6.71	$57,274
Conservative	Rodrigo Alfaro	7,549	15.30	−2.14	$35,152
New Democratic	François Pilon	4,986	10.11	+3.89	$1,499
Green	Gaëtan Bérard	1,380	2.80	−0.13	$1,387
Total valid votes		49,330	100.00		
Total rejected ballots		667	1.33		
Turnout		49,997	62.16	−2.71	
Electors on the lists		80,429			
Liberal hold		Swing		+6.08	
Source: Official Voting Results, 40th General Election 2008, Elections Canada.

2006 Canadian federal election: Honoré-Mercier
Party	Candidate	Votes	%	±%	Expenditures
Liberal	Pablo Rodríguez	19,622	38.23	−7.87	$62,095
Bloc Québécois	Gérard Labelle	17,879	34.83	−5.54	$39,105
Conservative	Angelo M. Marino	8,952	17.44	+11.42	$62,813
New Democratic	François Pilon	3,191	6.22	+2.13	$2,374
Green	Sylvain Castonguay	1,502	2.93	+1.16	not listed
Marxist–Leninist	Hélène Héroux	183	0.36	+0.02	none listed
Total valid votes		51,329	100.00		
Total rejected ballots		650	1.25		
Turnout		51,979	64.87	+3.23	
Electors on the lists		80,122			
Liberal hold		Swing		-1.17	
Source: Official Voting Results, 39th General Election, Elections Canada.

2004 Canadian federal election: Honoré-Mercier
Party	Candidate	Votes	%	±%	Expenditures
Liberal	Pablo Rodríguez	22,223	46.10	−11.76	$78,649
Bloc Québécois	Éric St-Hilaire	19,461	40.37	+10.02	$13,063
Conservative	Gianni Chiazzese	2,902	6.02	−2.28	$5,060
New Democratic	François Pilon	1,973	4.09	+2.81	$885
Green	Richard Lahaie	852	1.77	–	$0
Marijuana	Steve Boudrias	626	1.30	−0.59	none listed
Marxist–Leninist	Hélène Héroux	164	0.34	+0.03	none listed
Total valid votes		48,201	100.00		
Total rejected ballots		854	1.74		
Turnout		49,055	61.64		
Electors on the lists		79,585			
Note: Conservative vote is compared to the total of the Canadian Alliance vote and Progressive Conservative vote in 2000 election.
Source: Official Voting Results, Thirty-Eighth General Election, Elections Canada.
Liberal hold		Swing		-10.89	
