= Syndicat des Cols Bleus de la Ville de Laval =

Blue-collar trade union in Quebec, Canada

The Syndicat des Cols Bleus de la Ville de Laval is a trade union representing blue-collar workers in Laval, Quebec, Canada. It was established in 1965 and has been an affiliate of the Canadian Union of Public Employees since 2000.
