= Honoré-Mercier (electoral district) =

Federal electoral district in Quebec, Canada

Quebec electoral district
- Interactive map of riding boundaries from the 2025 federal election
- Coordinates: 45.63°N 73.57°W

Federal electoral district
- Legislature: House of Commons
MP
Éric St-Pierre
Liberal
- District created: 1987
- First contested: 1988
- Last contested: 2025
- District webpage: profile, map

Demographics
- Population (2016): 102,587
- Electors (2019): 78,549
- Area (km²): 39
- Pop. density (per km²): 2,630.4
- Census division: Montreal
- Census subdivision: Montreal (part)

Honoré-Mercier (French pronunciation: [ɔnɔʁe mɛʁsje]; formerly Anjou—Rivière-des-Prairies) is a federal electoral district in Montreal, Quebec, Canada, that has been represented in the House of Commons of Canada since 1988.

Its most recent Member of Parliament was Éric St-Pierre of the Liberal Party of Canada.

== Geography ==
The district includes the entire Borough of Anjou, the eastern part of the Borough of Rivière-des-Prairies–Pointe-aux-Trembles, and the northern part of the Borough of Mercier—Hochelaga-Maisonneuve.

The neighbouring ridings are Hochelaga—Rosemont-Est, Saint-Léonard—Saint-Michel, Bourassa, Alfred-Pellan, Montcalm, and La Pointe-de-l'Île.

=== Political geography ===
While the other eastern Montreal ridings have traditionally been Bloc Québécois strongholds, Honoré-Mercier is politically a very divided riding. Rivière-des-Prairies is very Liberal leaning, while Anjou supports the Bloc for the most part, but has some Liberal pockets.

However, the NDP's "orange wave" in the 2011 election overwhelmed previous distinctions, with the New Democrats winning 149 of 218 polling divisions in the district.

== Demographics ==
According to the 2021 Canadian census, 2023 representation order

Racial groups: 61.0% White, 20.1% Black, 8.4% Arab, 5.0% Latin American, 2.3% Southeast Asian
Languages: 50.8% French, 13.1% Italian, 12.1% English, 6.2% Creole, 5.1% Arabic, 5.0% Spanish, 2.2% Kabyle, 1.3% Portuguese, 1.0% Vietnamese
Religions: 69.0% Christian (52.0% Catholic, 1.9% Christian Orthodox, 1.6% Baptist, 1.5% Pentecostal, 12.1% Other), 12.8% Muslim, 1.7% Buddhist, 15.9% None
Median income: $38,400 (2020)
Average income: $46,240 (2020)

== History ==
The district was created in 1987 under the name Anjou—Rivière-des-Prairies from parts of Gamelin, Montreal—Mercier and Saint-Léonard—Anjou ridings.

It consisted of:

- the Borough of Anjou;
- the parts of the Town of Montréal bounded by:
1. Sherbrooke Street East, Duquesne Street, Rosemont Boulevard and Lacordaire Boulevard; and
2. Autoroute de la Rive Nord, Henri-Bourassa Boulevard East; the limits of the towns of Montréal-Est, Anjou and Montréal-Nord to the point of commencement.

In 2003, its name was changed to Honoré-Mercier and its boundaries were adjusted slightly such that 95.5% of the riding came from the original Anjou—Rivière-des-Prairies, while 4.5% came from Hochelaga—Maisonneuve.

This riding lost territory to La Pointe-de-l'Île and Hochelaga, and gained territory from Bourassa during the 2012 electoral redistribution.

Following the 2022 Canadian federal electoral redistribution, it gained the territory north of Boul. Langelier and west of Rue Bombardier from Saint-Léonard—Saint-Michel.

=== Member of Parliament ===
This riding has elected the following members of Parliament:

| Parliament | Years | Member | Party |
|---|---|---|---|
Anjou—Rivières-des-Prairies; Riding created from Gamelin, Montreal—Mercier and Saint-Léonard—Anjou
| 34th | 1988–1993 | Jean Corbeil | Progressive Conservative |
| 35th | 1993–1997 | Roger Pomerleau | Bloc Québécois |
| 36th | 1997–2000 | Yvon Charbonneau | Liberal |
| 37th | 2000–2004 | Yvon Charbonneau | Liberal |
Honoré-Mercier
| 38th | 2004–2006 | Pablo Rodriguez | Liberal |
| 39th | 2006–2008 | Pablo Rodriguez | Liberal |
| 40th | 2008–2011 | Pablo Rodriguez | Liberal |
| 41st | 2011–2015 | Paulina Ayala | New Democratic |
| 42nd | 2015–2019 | Pablo Rodriguez | Liberal |
| 43rd | 2019–2021 | Pablo Rodriguez | Liberal |
| 44th | 2021–2024 | Pablo Rodriguez | Liberal |
| 44th | 2024–2025 | Pablo Rodriguez | Independent |
| 45th | 2025–present | Éric St-Pierre | Liberal |

== Election results ==
=== Honoré-Mercier, 2003–present ===
2025 Canadian federal election
| Party | Candidate | Votes | % | ±% |
|---|---|---|---|---|
| Liberal | Éric St-Pierre | 29,947 | 60.16 | +0.16 |
| Conservative | Ingrid Fernanda Megni | 10,692 | 21.48 | +10.94 |
| Bloc Québécois | Edline Henri | 6,435 | 12.93 | -3.35 |
| New Democratic | Djaouida Sellah | 1,787 | 3.59 | -3.73 |
| Green | Gaëtan Bérard | 568 | 1.14 | -0.36 |
| People's | Marie-Louise Beauchamp | 351 | 0.71 | -3.48 |
| Total valid votes | | 49,780 | 98.34 | |
| Total rejected ballots | | 838 | 1.66 | -0.31 |
| Turnout | | 50,618 | 65.09 | |
| Eligible voters | | 77,770 | | |
| Liberal notional hold | | Swing | | -5.39 |
Source: Elections Canada
Note: number of eligible voters does not include voting day registrations.

2021 federal election redistributed results
| Party | Vote | % |
|---|---|---|
| Liberal | 29,280 | 59.99 |
| Bloc Québécois | 7,946 | 16.28 |
| Conservative | 5,145 | 10.54 |
| New Democratic | 3,570 | 7.31 |
| People's | 2,042 | 4.18 |
| Green | 734 | 1.50 |
| Marxist-Leninist | 88 | 0.18 |
| Total valid votes | 48,805 | 98.03 |
| Rejected ballots | 980 | 1.97 |
| Registered voters/ estimated turnout | 77,980 | 63.84 |

2021 Canadian federal election
| Party | Candidate | Votes | % | ±% | Expenditures |
|---|---|---|---|---|---|
| Liberal | Pablo Rodríguez | 29,033 | 60.0 | +1.3 | $39,670.10 |
| Bloc Québécois | Charlotte Lévesque-Marin | 7,908 | 16.3 | -3.5 | $3,008.90 |
| Conservative | Guy Croteau | 5,086 | 10.5 | +0.9 | $2,893.59 |
| New Democratic | Paulina Ayala | 3,537 | 7.3 | -0.9 | $433.46 |
| People's | Lucilia Miranda | 2,023 | 4.2 | +3.3 | $508.19 |
| Green | Bianca Deltorto-Russell | 734 | 1.5 | -1.2 | $0.00 |
| Marxist–Leninist | Yves Le Seigle | 88 | 0.2 | +0.1 | $0.00 |
| Total valid votes/expense limit | | 48,409 | 98.0 | – | $109,578.67 |
| Total rejected ballots | | 971 | 2.0 | | |
| Turnout | | 49,380 | 64.1 | | |
| Registered voters | | 77,078 | | | |
| Liberal hold | | Swing | | +2.4 | |
Source: Elections Canada

2019 Canadian federal election
| Party | Candidate | Votes | % | ±% | Expenditures |
|---|---|---|---|---|---|
| Liberal | Pablo Rodríguez | 29,543 | 58.66 | +2.11 | $45,514.73 |
| Bloc Québécois | Jacques Binette | 9,979 | 19.81 | +6.88 | $7,951.83 |
| Conservative | Guy Croteau | 4,808 | 9.55 | -2.5 | $3,314.94 |
| New Democratic | Chu Anh Pham | 4,130 | 8.2 | -8.21 | none listed |
| Green | Domenico Cusmano | 1,373 | 2.73 | +1.15 | none listed |
| People's | Patrick St-Onge | 459 | 0.91 | – | $2,885.14 |
| Marxist–Leninist | Yves Le Seigle | 71 | 0.14 | -0.02 | $0.00 |
| Total valid votes/expense limit | | 50,363 | 100.0 | | |
| Total rejected ballots | | 1,013 | | | |
| Turnout | | 51,376 | 65.4 | | |
| Eligible voters | | 78,549 | | | |
| Liberal hold | | Swing | | -2.39 | |
Source: Elections Canada

2015 Canadian federal election: Honoré-Mercier
| Party | Candidate | Votes | % | ±% | Expenditures |
|---|---|---|---|---|---|
| Liberal | Pablo Rodríguez | 29,211 | 56.55 | +23.5 | $53,622.10 |
| New Democratic | Paulina Ayala | 8,478 | 16.41 | -18.81 | $12,795.65 |
| Bloc Québécois | Audrey Beauséjour | 6,680 | 12.93 | -3.07 | $11,516.20 |
| Conservative | Guy Croteau | 6,226 | 12.05 | -0.96 | $3,697.33 |
| Green | Angela Budilean | 814 | 1.58 | -0.03 | – |
| Strength in Democracy | Dayana Dejean | 168 | 0.33 | – | – |
| Marxist–Leninist | Yves Le Seigle | 81 | 0.16 | -0.19 | – |
| Total valid votes/Expense limit | | 51,658 | 100.0 | | $213,214.66 |
| Total rejected ballots | | 682 | – | – | |
| Turnout | | 52,340 | – | – | |
| Eligible voters | | 78,428 | | | |
| Liberal gain from New Democratic | | Swing | | +17.11 | |
Source: Elections Canada

2011 federal election redistributed results
| Party | Vote | % |
|---|---|---|
| New Democratic | 15,854 | 35.22 |
| Liberal | 15,081 | 33.50 |
| Bloc Québécois | 7,204 | 16.00 |
| Conservative | 5,856 | 13.01 |
| Green | 725 | 1.61 |
| Others | 299 | 0.66 |

2011 Canadian federal election: Honoré-Mercier
| Party | Candidate | Votes | % | ±% | Expenditures |
|---|---|---|---|---|---|
| New Democratic | Paulina Ayala | 17,545 | 36.37 | +26.26 | |
| Liberal | Pablo Rodríguez | 14,641 | 30.35 | -13.32 | |
| Bloc Québécois | Martin Laroche | 8,935 | 18.52 | -9.60 | |
| Conservative | Gérard Labelle | 5,992 | 12.42 | -2.88 | |
| Green | Gaëtan Bérard | 770 | 1.60 | -1.20 | |
| Rhinoceros | Valery Chevrefils-Latulippe | 181 | 0.38 | – | |
| Marxist–Leninist | Jean-Paul Bédard | 170 | 0.35 | – | |
| Total valid votes | | 48,234 | 100.00 | | |
| Total rejected ballots | | 622 | 1.27 | -0.06 | |
| Turnout | | 48,856 | 59.98 | -2.18 | |
| New Democratic gain from Liberal | | Swing | | +19.79 | |

2008 Canadian federal election
| Party | Candidate | Votes | % | ±% | Expenditures |
|---|---|---|---|---|---|
| Liberal | Pablo Rodríguez | 21,544 | 43.67 | +5.44 | $64,461 |
| Bloc Québécois | Gérard Labelle | 13,871 | 28.12 | −6.71 | $57,274 |
| Conservative | Rodrigo Alfaro | 7,549 | 15.30 | −2.14 | $35,152 |
| New Democratic | François Pilon | 4,986 | 10.11 | +3.89 | $1,499 |
| Green | Gaëtan Bérard | 1,380 | 2.80 | −0.13 | $1,387 |
| Total valid votes | | 49,330 | 100.00 | | |
| Total rejected ballots | | 667 | 1.33 | | |
| Turnout | | 49,997 | 62.16 | −2.71 | |
| Electors on the lists | | 80,429 | | | |
| Liberal hold | | Swing | | +6.08 | |
Source: Official Voting Results, 40th General Election 2008, Elections Canada.

2006 Canadian federal election
| Party | Candidate | Votes | % | ±% | Expenditures |
|---|---|---|---|---|---|
| Liberal | Pablo Rodríguez | 19,622 | 38.23 | −7.87 | $62,095 |
| Bloc Québécois | Gérard Labelle | 17,879 | 34.83 | −5.54 | $39,105 |
| Conservative | Angelo M. Marino | 8,952 | 17.44 | +11.42 | $62,813 |
| New Democratic | François Pilon | 3,191 | 6.22 | +2.13 | $2,374 |
| Green | Sylvain Castonguay | 1,502 | 2.93 | +1.16 | not listed |
| Marxist–Leninist | Hélène Héroux | 183 | 0.36 | +0.02 | none listed |
| Total valid votes | | 51,329 | 100.00 | | |
| Total rejected ballots | | 650 | 1.25 | | |
| Turnout | | 51,979 | 64.87 | +3.23 | |
| Electors on the lists | | 80,122 | | | |
| Liberal hold | | Swing | | -1.17 | |
Source: Official Voting Results, 39th General Election, Elections Canada.

2004 Canadian federal election
| Party | Candidate | Votes | % | ±% | Expenditures |
|---|---|---|---|---|---|
| Liberal | Pablo Rodríguez | 22,223 | 46.10 | −11.76 | $78,649 |
| Bloc Québécois | Éric St-Hilaire | 19,461 | 40.37 | +10.02 | $13,063 |
| Conservative | Gianni Chiazzese | 2,902 | 6.02 | −2.28 | $5,060 |
| New Democratic | François Pilon | 1,973 | 4.09 | +2.81 | $885 |
| Green | Richard Lahaie | 852 | 1.77 | – | $0 |
| Marijuana | Steve Boudrias | 626 | 1.30 | −0.59 | none listed |
| Marxist–Leninist | Hélène Héroux | 164 | 0.34 | +0.03 | none listed |
| Total valid votes | | 48,201 | 100.00 | | |
| Total rejected ballots | | 854 | 1.74 | | |
| Turnout | | 49,055 | 61.64 | | |
| Electors on the lists | | 79,585 | | | |
Note: Conservative vote is compared to the total of the Canadian Alliance vote and Progressive Conservative vote in 2000 election.
Source: Official Voting Results, Thirty-Eighth General Election, Elections Canada.
| Liberal hold | | Swing | | -10.89 | |

=== Anjou—Rivière-des-Prairies, 1987–2003 ===
2000 Canadian federal election
| Party | Candidate | Votes | % | ±% |
|---|---|---|---|---|
| Liberal | Yvon Charbonneau | 28,134 | 57.86 | +10.55 |
| Bloc Québécois | Jacques Dagenais | 14,755 | 30.35 | -2.03 |
| Progressive Conservative | Michel Tanguay | 2,034 | 4.18 | -14.21 |
| Alliance | Gianni Chiazzese | 2,005 | 4.12 | – |
| Marijuana | Normand Néron | 918 | 1.89 | – |
| New Democratic | Bruce Whelan | 624 | 1.28 | -0.19 |
| Marxist–Leninist | Hélène Héroux | 151 | 0.31 | -0.13 |
| Total valid votes | | 48,621 | 100.00 | |

1997 Canadian federal election
| Party | Candidate | Votes | % | ±% |
|---|---|---|---|---|
| Liberal | Yvon Charbonneau | 24,189 | 47.31 | +5.09 |
| Bloc Québécois | Roger Pomerleau | 16,558 | 32.38 | -10.72 |
| Progressive Conservative | Jean Corbeil | 9,405 | 18.39 | +6.75 |
| New Democratic | Elizabeth Lemay Amabili | 752 | 1.47 | -0.11 |
| Marxist–Leninist | Yves Le Seigle | 227 | 0.44 | – |
| Total valid votes | | 51,131 | 100.00 | |

1993 Canadian federal election
| Party | Candidate | Votes | % | ±% |
|---|---|---|---|---|
| Bloc Québécois | Roger Pomerleau | 26,163 | 43.10 | – |
| Liberal | Normand Biron | 25,631 | 42.22 | +9.51 |
| Progressive Conservative | Jean Corbeil | 7,066 | 11.64 | -39.90 |
| New Democratic | Zamba Mandala | 958 | 1.58 | -10.98 |
| Natural Law | Gilles Raymond | 747 | 1.23 | – |
| Commonwealth of Canada | Frantz-Albert Mitton | 139 | 0.23 | – |
| Total valid votes | | 60,704 | 100.00 | |

1988 Canadian federal election
| Party | Candidate | Votes | % |
|---|---|---|---|
| Progressive Conservative | Jean Corbeil | 27,451 | 51.54 |
| Liberal | Vincent Arciresi | 17,421 | 32.71 |
| New Democratic | Vincent Marchione | 6,687 | 12.56 |
| Green | Mario Paul | 1,217 | 2.29 |
| Independent | Catherine Commandeur | 483 | 0.91 |
| Total valid votes | | 53,259 | 100.00 |

== See also ==
- List of Canadian electoral districts
- Historical federal electoral districts of Canada
