= Laval—Les Îles =

Federal electoral district in Quebec, Canada

Quebec electoral district
- Interactive map of riding boundaries from the 2015 federal election
- Coordinates: 45.544°N 73.837°W

Federal electoral district
- Legislature: House of Commons
MP
Fayçal El-Khoury
Liberal
- District created: 2003
- First contested: 2004
- Last contested: 2025
- District webpage: profile, map

Demographics
- Population (2021): 111,785
- Electors (2019): 83,233
- Area (km²): 47
- Pop. density (per km²): 2,378.4
- Census division: Laval
- Census subdivision: Laval

Laval—Les Îles (French pronunciation: [laval lez‿il]; lit. 'Laval—The Islands') is a federal electoral district in Quebec, Canada, which has been represented in the House of Commons since 2004.

Its population in 2021 was 111,785. Of the population, 17.9% are Christian Orthodox, and 11.5% are of Greek ethnic or cultural origin, both the highest such percentages in Canada.

Since 2015 its member of Parliament (MP) has been Fayçal El-Khoury of the Liberal Party.

== Geography ==
The district includes the neighbourhoods of Îles-Laval, Laval-Ouest, Laval-sur-le-Lac, Sainte-Dorothée, the western part of the neighbourhood of Fabreville and the western part of Chomedey in the city of Laval.

The neighbouring ridings are Vimy, Ahuntsic-Cartierville, Pierrefonds—Dollard, Rivière-des-Mille-Îles, and Marc-Aurèle-Fortin.

== Demographics ==
According to the 2021 Canadian census

- Mother tongue (single responses: 91.9%): French (41%), English (11.1%), Arabic (9.1%), Greek (7.7%), Armenian (4.3%)

== History ==
The electoral district was created in 2003 from parts of Laval West riding.

This riding lost territory to Vimy and Marc-Aurèle-Fortin during the 2012 electoral redistribution.

This riding has elected the following MPs:

Parliament	Years	Member	Party
Laval—Les Îles; Riding created from Laval West
38th	2004–2006	Raymonde Folco	Liberal
39th	2006–2008	Raymonde Folco	Liberal
40th	2008–2011	Raymonde Folco	Liberal
41st	2011–2015	François Pilon	New Democratic
42nd	2015–2019	Fayçal El-Khoury	Liberal
43rd	2019–2021	Fayçal El-Khoury	Liberal
44th	2021–2025	Fayçal El-Khoury	Liberal
45th	2025–present	Fayçal El-Khoury	Liberal

== Election results ==
Graph of election results in Laval—Les Îles (minor parties that never got 2% of the vote or didn't run consistently are omitted) View source data.

2025 Canadian federal election
Party	Candidate	Votes	%	±%	Expenditures
Liberal	Fayçal El-Khoury	28,302	49.73	+0.80	$74,280.82
Conservative	Konstantinos Merakos	18,355	32.25	+14.54	$65,478.47
Bloc Québécois	Catherine Dansereau-Redhead	8,298	14.58	–4.50	$8,392.32
New Democratic	Étienne Loiselle-Schiettekatte	1,961	3.45	–4.24	$1,781.12
Total valid votes/expense limit		56,916	98.69	–	$132,821.52
Total rejected ballots		758	1.31		
Turnout		57,674	66.53		
Eligible voters		86,685			
Liberal hold		Swing		–6.87	
Source: Elections Canada
Note: number of eligible voters does not include voting day registrations.

2021 Canadian federal election
Party	Candidate	Votes	%	±%	Expenditures
Liberal	Fayçal El-Khoury	24,758	48.9	+0.7	$67,794.59
Bloc Québécois	Guillaume Jolivet	9,656	19.1	-1.5	$3,008.90
Conservative	Spyridonas Pettas	8,963	17.7	+1.4	$25,344.16
New Democratic	Rowan Woodmass	3,889	7.7	-1.2	$450.32
People's	Matthieu Couture	2,571	5.1	+3.4	$1,531.26
Green	Ahmed Taleb	760	1.5	-2.8	$2,760.37
Total valid votes/expense limit		50,597	98.4	–	$112,913.17
Total rejected ballots		819	1.6		
Turnout		51,416	61.9		
Eligible voters		83,045			
Liberal hold		Swing		+1.1	
Source: Elections Canada

2019 Canadian federal election
Party	Candidate	Votes	%	±%	Expenditures
Liberal	Fayçal El-Khoury	26,031	48.2	+0.50	$93,691.28
Bloc Québécois	Nacera Beddad	11,120	20.6	+8.18	$1,900.53
Conservative	Tom Pentefountas	8,816	16.3	-1.80	none listed
New Democratic	Noémia Onofre De Lima	4,803	8.9	-10.87	none listed
Green	Sari Madi	2,306	4.3	+2.61	none listed
People's	Marie-Louise Beauchamp	885	1.7		$0.00
Total valid votes/expense limit		53,961	100.0		
Total rejected ballots		840			
Turnout		54,801	65.8		
Eligible voters		83,233			
Liberal hold		Swing		-3.84	
Source: Elections Canada

2015 Canadian federal election
Party	Candidate	Votes	%	±%	Expenditures
Liberal	Fayçal El-Khoury	25,857	47.70	+27.07	$86,424.50
New Democratic	François Pilon	10,710	19.77	-27.43	$29,014.20
Conservative	Roland Dick	9,811	18.10	+1.67	$114,413.09
Bloc Québécois	Nancy Redhead	6,731	12.42	-0.47	$19,952.32
Green	Faiza R'Guiba-Kalogerakis	919	1.69	-0.09	$2,605.36
Marxist–Leninist	Yvon Breton	175	0.32	-0.04	–
Total valid votes/expense limit		–	100.0		$218,884.73
Total rejected ballots		–	–	–	
Turnout		54,203	–	–	
Eligible voters		81,562			
Source: Elections Canada

2011 federal election redistributed results
Party	Vote	%
New Democratic	21,069	47.20
Liberal	9,208	20.63
Conservative	7,333	16.43
Bloc Québécois	5,755	12.89
Green	794	1.78
Others	483	1.08

2011 Canadian federal election
Party	Candidate	Votes	%	±%	Expenditures
New Democratic	François Pilon	25,703	47.64	+36.18	
Liberal	Karine Joizil	11,108	20.59	-19.85	
Conservative	Zaki Ghavitian	8,587	15.92	-4.70	
Bloc Québécois	Mohamedali Jetha	7,022	13.02	-10.52	
Green	Brent Neil	966	1.79	-1.49	
Pirate	Stéphane Bakhos	369	0.68		
Marxist–Leninist	Polyvios Tsakanikas	194	0.36	–	
Total valid votes/expense limit		53,949	100.00		
Total rejected ballots		702	1.28	-0.06	
Turnout		54,651	59.31	-2.38	

2008 Canadian federal election
Party	Candidate	Votes	%	±%	Expenditures
Liberal	Raymonde Folco	21,603	40.44	+1.13	$46,790
Bloc Québécois	Mohamedali Jetha	12,576	23.54	-9.53	$43,306
Conservative	Agop Evereklian	11,017	20.62	+3.55	$88,318
New Democratic	Zahia El-Masri	6,124	11.46	+4.27	$5,682
Green	Brent Neil	1,752	3.28	+0.35	$20
Rhinoceros	Sylvain A. Trottier	336	0.62		$184
Total valid votes/expense limit		53,408	100.00	$90,317	
Total rejected ballots		725	1.34	+0.03	
Turnout		54,133	61.69	-1.78	

2006 Canadian federal election
Party	Candidate	Votes	%	±%	Expenditures
Liberal	Raymonde Folco	20,849	39.31	-8.55	$53,323
Bloc Québécois	Christiane Pichette	17,537	33.07	-4.04	$51,106
Conservative	Qais Hamidi	9,055	17.07	+10.09	$24,108
New Democratic	Alain Giguère	3,817	7.19	+2.80	$1,122
Green	Theodore Kouretas	1,557	2.93	+0.58	$0
Marxist–Leninist	Polyvios Tsakanikas	211	0.39	+0.08	
Total		53,524	100.00	$82,901	
Total rejected ballots		709	1.31		
Turnout		54,133	63.47		

2004 Canadian federal election
Party	Candidate	Votes	%	±%	Expenditures
Liberal	Raymonde Folco	23,985	47.86	–	$41,522
Bloc Québécois	Micaël Poirier	18,597	37.11	–	$19,639
Conservative	Jean-Paul Pratte	3,498	6.98	–	$8,960
New Democratic	Paul Michaud	2,202	4.39	–	$1,461
Green	Pierre Véronneau	1,178	2.35	–	$1,860
Marijuana	Michel Allard	498	0.99	–	
Marxist–Leninist	Polyvios Tsakanikas	154	0.31	–	
Total valid votes/expense limit		50,112	100.00	$80,533	

== See also ==
- List of Canadian electoral districts
- Historical federal electoral districts of Canada
