= David Allen Laird =

David Alan Laird is a professor at Iowa State University, Department of Agronomy, Ames, Iowa. Throughout his career as a soil scientist, he made many contributions to clay mineralogy, including developing a model describing the relationship between cation selectivity and the extent of crystalline swelling in expanding 2:1 phyllosilicates. Other work demonstrated the effects of ionic strength and cation charge on the breakup and formation of smectitic quasicrystals and the principle of cation demixing which lent great insight into understanding clay flocculation. Investigations in organic matter interactions with clay minerals led to the development of the idea of dual mode bonding in which amphipathic molecules interact with substrates by both hydrophobic-hydrophobic and hydrophilic-hydrophilic interactions. Laird et al. (2008) showed that smectites, a class of clay minerals found in soil, can adsorb tremendous amounts of organic materials and, hence, strongly influence the transport and bioavailability of organic materials including pesticides applied to the soil. In a study published in 2003, Gonzalez and Laird showed that new carbon derived from decomposing plant material tends to preferentially sorb to the fine clay subfraction of soil. Further work demonstrated that the coarse clay fraction had the greatest carbon to nitrogen ratio, greatest minimum residence time in the soil based on ^{14}C radioisotope dating, and contained carbon most recalcitrant to microbial digestion. Collectively many of Dr. Laird's contributions to soil science have provided insight into understanding soil organic matter and clay interactions and, thus, the genesis of soil peds from the molecular viewpoint.

More recent work has been focused on identifying pyrogenic carbon in soil with an emphasis on biochar soil application and studying the impact of biochar on soil properties. He also founded and led the USDA-ARS Biochar and Pyrolysis Initiative from 2008 - 2010 and has made continued contributions in the characterization of biochar and understanding its role in soil environments.
