= Paulina Ayala =

Canadian politician (born 1962)

Member of Parliament for Honoré—Mercier
- In office May 2, 2011 – August 4, 2015
- Preceded by: Pablo Rodriguez
- Succeeded by: Pablo Rodriguez

Personal details
- Born: June 25, 1962 (age 63) Santiago, Chile
- Party: New Democratic Party
- Profession: Teacher

Paulina Ayala (born June 25, 1962) is a Canadian politician who served as member of Parliament for the riding of Honoré—Mercier from 2011 to 2015. She is a member of the New Democratic Party. She succeeded Pablo Rodriguez of the Liberal Party.

== Early life and education ==
She was born in Santiago, Chile, and was a leader in the student movement and in citizens' rights organizations during the Pinochet dictatorship. She later immigrated to Canada in 1995 and settled in Montreal. She earned a certificate in French as a second language and multicultural education from the Université du Québec à Montréal. She has a diploma in education, history and geography.

== Political career ==
Ayala was elected to represent Honoré-Mercier in the 2011 Canadian federal election. In the 2015 federal election, Pablo Rodriguez defeated Ayala in a rematch. Ayala ran in the 2018 Quebec general election in Rosemont for the provincial NDP but lost by a large margin.

Ayala contested the riding of Saint-Léonard—Saint-Michel in the 2019 federal election but lost. She again contested Honoré—Mercier at the snap 2021 election but finished fourth and her opponent for the third time, Rodriguez, easily won re-election in a landslide.

She ran in the 2021 Montreal municipal election as a Mouvement Montréal candidate for the city council seat of Saint-Leonard Est. She came in third place with around 12% of the vote.

=== Federal ===
2021 Canadian federal election: Honoré-Mercier
Party	Candidate	Votes	%	±%	Expenditures
Liberal	Pablo Rodríguez	29,033	60.0	+1.3	$39,670.10
Bloc Québécois	Charlotte Lévesque-Marin	7,908	16.3	-3.5	$3,008.90
Conservative	Guy Croteau	5,086	10.5	+0.9	$2,893.59
New Democratic	Paulina Ayala	3,537	7.3	-0.9	$433.46
People's	Lucilia Miranda	2,023	4.2	+3.3	$508.19
Green	Bianca Deltorto-Russell	734	1.5	-1.2	$0.00
Marxist–Leninist	Yves Le Seigle	88	0.2	+0.1	$0.00
Total valid votes/expense limit		48,409	98.0	–	$109,578.67
Total rejected ballots		971	2.0		
Turnout		49,380	64.1		
Registered voters		77,078			
Liberal hold		Swing		+2.4	
Source: Elections Canada

2019 Canadian federal election: Saint-Léonard—Saint-Michel
Party	Candidate	Votes	%	±%	Expenditures
Liberal	Patricia Lattanzio	27,866	61.33	-3.40	$39,698.45
Conservative	Ilario Maiolo	5,423	11.94	+0.81	$50,901.27
Bloc Québécois	Dominique Mougin	4,351	9.58	+2.39	none listed
Independent	Hassan Guillet	3,061	6.74	–	none listed
New Democratic	Paulina Ayala	2,964	6.52	-8.33	$1,299.32
Green	Alessandra Szilagyi	1,183	2.60	0.79	$512.28
People's	Tina Di Serio	501	1.10	–	$1,392.50
Marxist–Leninist	Garnet Colly	85	0.19	-0.10	$0.00
Total valid votes		45,434	100.0		
Total rejected ballots		993	2.19		
Turnout		46,427	60.38	+1.16	
Eligible voters		76,885			
Liberal hold		Swing		-2.11	
Source: Elections Canada

2015 Canadian federal election: Honoré-Mercier
Party	Candidate	Votes	%	±%	Expenditures
Liberal	Pablo Rodríguez	29,211	56.55	+20.18	–
New Democratic	Paulina Ayala	8,478	16.41	-13.94	–
Bloc Québécois	Audrey Beauséjour	6,680	12.93	-5.59	–
Conservative	Guy Croteau	6,226	12.05	-0.37	–
Green	Angela Budilean	814	1.58	-0.02	–
Strength in Democracy	Dayana Dejean	168	0.33	–	–
Marxist–Leninist	Yves Le Seigle	81	0.16	-0.19	–
Total valid votes/expense limit		51,658	100.0		$212,950.75
Total rejected ballots		682	–	–	
Turnout		52,340	–	–	
Eligible voters		78,428			
Liberal gain from New Democratic		Swing		+17.11	
Source: Elections Canada

2011 Canadian federal election: Honoré-Mercier
Party	Candidate	Votes	%	±%	Expenditures
New Democratic	Paulina Ayala	17,545	36.37	+26.26	
Liberal	Pablo Rodríguez	14,641	30.35	-13.32	
Bloc Québécois	Martin Laroche	8,935	18.52	-9.60	
Conservative	Gérard Labelle	5,992	12.42	-2.88	
Green	Gaëtan Bérard	770	1.60	-1.20	
Rhinoceros	Valery Chevrefils-Latulippe	181	0.38	–	
Marxist–Leninist	Jean-Paul Bédard	170	0.35	–	
Total valid votes		48,234	100.00		
Total rejected ballots		622	1.27	-0.06	
Turnout		48,856	59.98	-2.18	
New Democratic gain from Liberal		Swing		+19.79	

=== Provincial ===
2018 Quebec general election
Party	Candidate	Votes	%	±%
Québec solidaire	Vincent Marissal	12,919	35.25	+16.57
Parti Québécois	Jean-François Lisée	10,419	28.43	-5.84
Liberal	Agata La Rosa	6,148	16.77	-13.19
Coalition Avenir Québec	Sonya Cormier	5,703	15.56	+1.40
Green	Karl Dubois	521	1.42	+0.10
New Democratic	Paulina Ayala	314	0.86	New
Parti nul	Catherine Raymond-Poirier	224	0.61	New
Conservative	Alexandra Liendo	218	0.59	New
Bloc Pot	Coralie Laperrière	130	0.35	-0.19
Marxist–Leninist	Stéphane Chénier	55	0.15	-0.06
Total valid votes			100.0	
Total rejected ballots				
Turnout				
Eligible voters				
Québec solidaire gain from Parti Québécois		Swing		+11.20

== Municipal ==
2021 Montreal municipal election: City Councillor, Saint-Léonard-Est
Party	Candidate	Votes	%	±%	Expenditures
Ensemble Montréal	Angela Gentile	4,372	62.90	-4.55	
Projet Montréal	Nathan Dratler	1,173	16.88	-15.67	
Mouvement Montréal	Paulina Ayala	832	11.97	new	
Independent	Dallal Boukhari	574	8.26		
Total valid votes/expense limit		6,951	96.25%		
Total rejected ballots		271	3.75%	-1.97	
Turnout		7,222	34.10%	-4.69	
Eligible voters		21,180	–	–	
