= Pauline Picard =

Canadian politician (1947–2009)

Member of Parliament for Drummond
- In office October 25, 1993 – October 14, 2008
- Preceded by: Jean-Guy Guilbault
- Succeeded by: Roger Pomerleau

Personal details
- Born: April 27, 1947 Saint-Gabriel-de-Kamouraska, Quebec, Canada
- Died: June 29, 2009 (aged 62) Drummondville, Quebec, Canada
- Party: Bloc Québécois
- Profession: Administrative assistant, employment consultant, financial agent

Pauline Picard (French pronunciation: [pɔlin pikaʁ]; April 27, 1947 – June 29, 2009) was a Canadian politician. She was the Bloc Québécois (BQ) Member of Parliament (MP) for the riding of Drummond from 1993 to 2008.

Born in Saint-Gabriel-de-Kamouraska, she was an administrative assistant, employment consultant, and financial advisor before she was first elected in 1993. She was re-elected in 1997, 2000 and 2004. She served as the Deputy Whip of the Bloc Québécois.

She did not run for re-election in the 2008 election. She died on June 29, 2009, after a struggle with lung cancer.

== Electoral record ==
2004 Canadian federal election: Drummond
Party	Candidate	Votes	%	±%	Expenditures
Bloc Québécois	Pauline Picard	23,670	56.29		$49,554.16
Liberal	Roger Gougeon	9,591	22.81	–	$57,454.07
Conservative	Lyne Boisvert	7,123	16.94		$68,072.40
Green	Louis Lacroix	921	2.19		none listed
New Democratic	Blake Evans	745	1.77		none listed
Total valid votes		42,050	100.00		
Total rejected ballots		1,191			
Turnout		43,241	61.33		
Electors on the lists		70,510			
Percentage change figures are factored for redistribution. Conservative Party percentages are contrasted with the combined Canadian Alliance and Progressive Conservative percentages from 2000.
Sources: Official Results, Elections Canada and Financial Returns, Elections Canada.
