= Drummond (federal electoral district) =

Federal electoral district in Quebec, Canada

Quebec electoral district
- Interactive map of riding boundaries from the 2004 federal election
- Coordinates: 45.900°N 72.450°W

Federal electoral district
- Legislature: House of Commons
MP
Martin Champoux
Bloc Québécois
- District created: 1966
- First contested: 1968
- Last contested: 2021
- District webpage: profile, map

Demographics
- Population (2016): 103,397
- Electors (2019): 83,916
- Area (km²): 1,670
- Pop. density (per km²): 61.9
- Census division: Drummond RCM
- Census subdivision(s): Drummondville, Saint-Germain-de-Grantham, Saint-Cyrille-de-Wendover, Wickham, Saint-Lucien, Notre-Dame-du-Bon-Conseil, Saint-Félix-de-Kingsey, Saint-Guillaume, Saint-Majorique-de-Grantham, L'Avenir

Drummond (Canadian French: [dʁɔmɔnd]) is a federal electoral district in Quebec, Canada, that has been represented in the House of Commons since 1968. It was created in 1966 from Drummond—Arthabaska, Nicolet—Yamaska and Richmond—Wolfe.

Since 2019 its Member of Parliament (MP) has been Martin Champoux of the Bloc Québécois (BQ).

== Geography ==
The riding, located along the Saint-François River in the Quebec region of Centre-du-Québec, consists of the RCM of Drummond. The largest city is Drummondville.

The neighbouring ridings are Bas-Richelieu—Nicolet—Bécancour, Richmond—Arthabaska, Shefford, and Saint-Hyacinthe—Bagot.

There were no changes to this riding from the 2012 electoral redistribution.

== Members of Parliament ==
This riding has elected the following members of Parliament:

Parliament	Years	Member	Party
Drummond; Riding created from Drummond—Arthabaska, Nicolet—Yamaska and Richmond—Wolfe
28th	1968–1972	Jean-Luc Pépin	Liberal
29th	1972–1974	Jean-Marie Boisvert	Social Credit
30th	1974–1979	Yvon Pinard	Liberal
31st	1979–1980	Yvon Pinard	Liberal
32nd	1980–1984	Yvon Pinard	Liberal
33rd	1984–1988	Jean-Guy Guilbault	Progressive Conservative
34th	1988–1993	Jean-Guy Guilbault	Progressive Conservative
35th	1993–1997	Pauline Picard	Bloc Québécois
36th	1997–2000	Pauline Picard	Bloc Québécois
37th	2000–2004	Pauline Picard	Bloc Québécois
38th	2004–2006	Pauline Picard	Bloc Québécois
39th	2006–2008	Pauline Picard	Bloc Québécois
40th	2008–2011	Roger Pomerleau	Bloc Québécois
41st	2011–2015	François Choquette	New Democratic
42nd	2015–2019	François Choquette	New Democratic
43rd	2019–2021	Martin Champoux	Bloc Québécois
44th	2021–2025	Martin Champoux	Bloc Québécois
45th	2025–present	Martin Champoux	Bloc Québécois

== Election results ==
2025 Canadian federal election
Party	Candidate	Votes	%	±%	Expenditures
Bloc Québécois	Martin Champoux	24,071	42.80	-3.82	
Liberal	Ghada Jerbi	15,998	28.45	+9.67	
Conservative	François Fréchette	12,790	22.74	+4.81	
New Democratic	François Choquette	2,607	4.64	-6.51	
People's	William Trottier	773	1.37	N/A	
Total valid votes/expense limit		56,239	98.09		
Total rejected ballots		1,095	1.91		
Turnout		57,334	65.09		
Eligible voters		88,085			
Bloc Québécois hold		Swing		-6.75	
Source: Elections Canada
Note: number of eligible voters does not include voting day registrations.

2021 Canadian federal election
Party	Candidate	Votes	%	±%	Expenditures
Bloc Québécois	Martin Champoux	23,866	46.62	+1.80	$25,502.47
Liberal	Mustapha Berri	9,614	18.78	+1.36	$7,431.67
Conservative	Nathalie Clermont	9,179	17.93	+1.36	$26,169.29
New Democratic	François Choquette	5,709	11.15	-4.75	$2,464.36
Free	Josée Joyal	1,728	3.38	–	$737.73
Animal Protection	Lucas Munger	674	1.32	+0.86	$6,472.17
No affiliation	Sylvain Marcoux	419	0.82	–	$1,820.27
Total valid votes/expense limit		51,189	97.54	–	$114,998.66
Total rejected ballots		1,289	2.46	–	
Turnout		52,478	61.33	-5.22	
Registered voters		85,569			
Bloc Québécois hold		Swing		+0.22	
Source: Elections Canada

2019 Canadian federal election
Party	Candidate	Votes	%	±%	Expenditures
Bloc Québécois	Martin Champoux	24,574	44.82	+22	$18,378.63
Liberal	William Morales	9,552	17.42	-9.1	$17,277.86
Conservative	Jessica Ebacher	9,086	16.57	-1.1	none listed
New Democratic	François Choquette	8,716	15.90	-14.6	none listed
Green	Frédérik Bernier	1,856	3.39	+1	$3,099.20
People's	Steeve Paquet	525	0.96		$2,460.77
Rhinoceros	Réal Batrhino	270	0.49		$2,215.01
Animal Protection	Lucas Munger	248	0.45		$2,484.77
Total valid votes/expense limit		54,824	97.99		
Total rejected ballots		1,126	2.01		
Turnout		55,950	66.55		
Eligible voters		84,074			
Bloc Québécois gain from New Democratic		Swing		+15.55	
Source: Elections Canada

2015 Canadian federal election
Party	Candidate	Votes	%	±%	Expenditures
New Democratic	François Choquette	15,833	30.5	-21.1	$46,839.41
Liberal	Pierre Côté	13,793	26.5	+18.1	$17,306.35
Bloc Québécois	Diane Bourgeois	11,862	22.8	+0.8	$34,502.97
Conservative	Pascale Déry	9,221	17.7	+1.8	$58,680.41
Green	Émile Coderre	1,270	2.4	+0.3	–
Total valid votes/expense limit		51,979	100.0		$217,456.41
Total rejected ballots		1,098	–	–	
Turnout		53,077	–	–	
Eligible voters		81,303			
New Democratic hold		Swing		-19.6	
Source: Elections Canada

2011 Canadian federal election
Party	Candidate	Votes	%	±%	Expenditures
New Democratic	François Choquette	24,489	51.6	+34.8	
Bloc Québécois	Roger Pomerleau	10,410	22.0	-16.8	
Conservative	Normand W. Bernier	7,555	15.9	-9.4	
Liberal	Pierre Côté	3,979	8.4	-8.4	
Green	Robin Fortin	987	2.1	-0.4	
Total valid votes/expense limit		47,420	100.0		
Total rejected ballots		878	1.82	-0.38	
Turnout		48,298	62.59	–	
Eligible voters		77,162	–	–	

2008 Canadian federal election
Party	Candidate	Votes	%	±%	Expenditures
Bloc Québécois	Roger Pomerleau	17,613	38.8	-10.9	$41,200
Conservative	André Komlosy	11,490	25.3	+3.0	$77,182
Liberal	Jean Courchesne	7,697	17.0	+0.6	$13,625
New Democratic	Annick Corriveau	7,640	16.8	+10.5	$6,172
Green	Réginald Gagnon	1,144	2.5	-2.8	
Total valid votes/expense limit		45,404	100.0	$82,531	
Total rejected ballots		1,022	2.20		
Turnout		–	–		

2006 Canadian federal election
Party	Candidate	Votes	%	±%	Expenditures
Bloc Québécois	Pauline Picard	22,575	49.7	-6.6	$38,371
Conservative	Jean-Marie Pineault	10,134	22.3	+5.4	$51,057
Liberal	Éric Cardinal	7,437	16.4	-6.4	$75,543
New Democratic	François Choquette	2,870	6.3	+4.5	$1,903
Green	Jean-Benjamin Milot	2,418	5.3	+3.1	$865
Total valid votes/expense limit		45,434	100.0	$76,054	

2004 Canadian federal election
Party	Candidate	Votes	%	±%	Expenditures
Bloc Québécois	Pauline Picard	23,670	56.3	+11.2	$55,860
Liberal	Roger Gougeon	9,591	22.8	-11.4	$60,104
Conservative	Lyne Boisvert	7,123	16.9	-2.7	$72,925
Green	Louis Lacroix	921	2.2	–	
New Democratic	Blake Evans	745	1.8	+0.8	
Total valid votes/expense limit		42,050	100.0	$73,968	

Note: Conservative vote is compared to the total of the Canadian Alliance vote and Progressive Conservative vote in the 2000 election.

2000 Canadian federal election
Party	Candidate	Votes	%	±%
Bloc Québécois	Pauline Picard	18,843	45.1	+2.9
Liberal	André Béliveau	14,285	34.2	+11.1
Progressive Conservative	Lyne Boisvert	6,593	15.8	-17.8
Alliance	Jacques Laurin	1,606	3.8	
New Democratic	Julie Philion	424	1.0	0.0
Total valid votes		41,751	100.0	

1997 Canadian federal election
Party	Candidate	Votes	%	±%
Bloc Québécois	Pauline Picard	18,577	42.3	-12.5
Progressive Conservative	Lyne Boisvert	14,777	33.6	+13.7
Liberal	Christian Méthot	10,165	23.1	-0.9
New Democratic	Alexandra Philoctéte	441	1.0	-0.3
Total valid votes		43,960	100.0	

1993 Canadian federal election
Party	Candidate	Votes	%	±%
Bloc Québécois	Pauline Picard	24,930	54.8	
Liberal	Bernard Boudreau	10,935	24.0	-10.7
Progressive Conservative	Jean-Guy Guilbault	9,041	19.9	-33.7
New Democratic	Ferdinand Berner	600	1.3	-10.4
Total valid votes		45,506	100.0	

1988 Canadian federal election
Party	Candidate	Votes	%	±%
Progressive Conservative	Jean-Guy Guilbault	23,703	53.5	-2.7
Liberal	Jean-Claude Lagacé	15,380	34.7	+1.2
New Democratic	Ferdinand Berner	5,204	11.8	5.6
Total valid votes		44,287	100.0	

1984 Canadian federal election
Party	Candidate	Votes	%	±%
Progressive Conservative	Jean-Guy Guilbault	23,693	56.2	+41.5
Liberal	Michel Yip	14,137	33.6	-39.2
New Democratic	Louis G. Garreau	2,610	6.2	-0.2
Parti nationaliste	Camillien Belhumeur	1,057	2.5	
Independent	Joseph Richard Miller	338	0.8	
Social Credit	René Martineau	301	0.7	-4.6
Total valid votes		42,136	100.0	

1980 Canadian federal election
Party	Candidate	Votes	%	±%
Liberal	Yvon Pinard	26,082	72.8	+15.6
Progressive Conservative	Gilbert Lapointe	5,265	14.7	+0.4
New Democratic	André Lefebvre	2,305	6.4	+4.8
Social Credit	Henri Farley	1,916	5.3	-19.6
Union populaire	Gaétan Giroux	180	0.5	+0.2
Marxist–Leninist	J.-P. Ginchereau	97	0.3	+0.1
Total valid votes		35,845	100.0	

1979 Canadian federal election
Party	Candidate	Votes	%	±%
Liberal	Yvon Pinard	22,989	57.2	+15.0
Social Credit	Robert Biron	10,010	24.9	-17.2
Progressive Conservative	Paul Lavigne	5,746	14.3	+0.2
Rhinoceros	Normand Blanchette	641	1.6	
New Democratic	Patricia Lamarre	639	1.6	-0.1
Union populaire	Marc Rochefort	106	0.3	
Marxist–Leninist	J.-P. Ginchereau	67	0.2	
Total valid votes		40,198	100.0	

1974 Canadian federal election
Party	Candidate	Votes	%	±%
Liberal	Yvon Pinard	15,561	42.1	+0.1
Social Credit	Jean-Marie Boisvert	15,548	42.1	-0.1
Progressive Conservative	Armand Cyrenne	5,186	14.0	-0.1
New Democratic	Gisel Marotte	630	1.7	+0.1
Total valid votes		36,925	100.0	

1972 Canadian federal election
Party	Candidate	Votes	%	±%
Social Credit	Jean-Marie Boisvert	15,923	42.2	+10.7
Liberal	Jean-Luc Pépin	15,853	42.0	+3.5
Progressive Conservative	Roger Rousseau	5,351	14.2	-13.4
New Democratic	Ann Dewitt	590	1.6	-0.8
Total valid votes		37,717	100.0	

Note: Social Credit vote is compared to Ralliement créditiste vote in the 1968 election.

1968 Canadian federal election
Party	Candidate	Votes	%
Liberal	Jean-Luc Pépin	11,667	38.5
Ralliement créditiste	Claude Proulx	9,545	31.5
Progressive Conservative	André Biron	8,342	27.6
New Democratic	Pierre Gagné	723	2.4
Total valid votes		30,277	100.0

== See also ==
- List of Canadian electoral districts
- Historical federal electoral districts of Canada
