= Elizabeth May =

Canadian politician (born 1954)

Elizabeth May OC MP
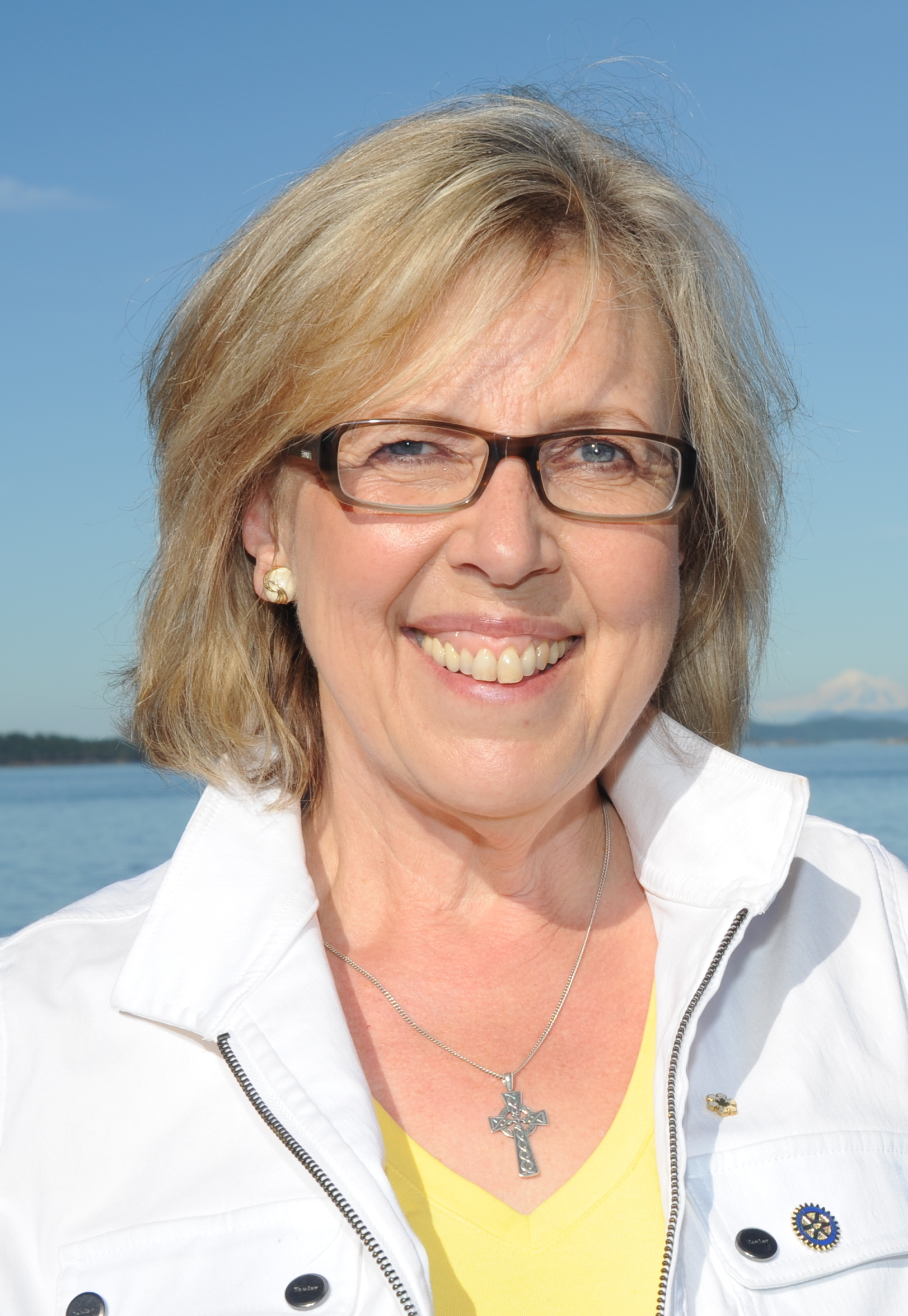
- May in 2014

Leader of the Green Party
- In office November 19, 2022 – November 14, 2026 Co-leading with Jonathan Pedneault (2025)
- Deputy: See list: Jonathan Pedneault; Angela Davidson; Mike Morrice
- Preceded by: Amita Kuttner (interim)
- Succeeded by: Mike Morrice
- In office August 26, 2006 – November 4, 2019
- Deputy: See list: Adriane Carr; Claude Genest; Jacques Rivard; Georges Laraque; Bruce Hyer; Daniel Green; Jo-Ann Roberts
- Preceded by: Jim Harris
- Succeeded by: Jo-Ann Roberts (interim)

Parliamentary leader of the Green Party
- Incumbent
- Assumed office November 14, 2026
- Leader: Mike Morrice
- Preceded by: Herself (as party leader)
- In office November 4, 2019 – November 19, 2022
- Leader: Jo-Ann Roberts (interim); Annamie Paul; Amita Kuttner (interim)
- Preceded by: Herself (as party leader)
- Succeeded by: Herself (as party leader)

Member of Parliament for Saanich—Gulf Islands
- Incumbent
- Assumed office May 2, 2011
- Preceded by: Gary Lunn

Personal details
- Born: Elizabeth Evans May; June 9, 1954 (age 72) Hartford, Connecticut, U.S.
- Citizenship: Canada; United States (until 1978)
- Party: Green
- Other political affiliations: The Small Party (1980)
- Spouse: John Kidder (m. 2019)
- Children: 1
- Education: Dalhousie University (LLB)

Elizabeth Evans May OC MP (born June 9, 1954) is a Canadian politician, environmentalist, lawyer, activist, and author who has served as a member of Parliament (MP) representing the riding of Saanich—Gulf Islands since 2011. She served as leader of the Green Party of Canada from 2006 to 2019 and again from 2022 to 2026.

May is the longest-serving female leader of a Canadian federal party and the first Green Party member elected to the House of Commons. From 1989 to 2006 she was executive director of Sierra Club Canada. In 2005 she was appointed an Officer of the Order of Canada; the United Nations has recognized her as one of the world’s leading women environmentalists. She is the author of eight books, including the memoir Who We Are – Reflections of My Life and Canada, a Globe and Mail bestseller.

== Early life and education ==
May was born in Hartford, Connecticut, the daughter of Stephanie (Middleton), a sculptor, pianist, and writer, and John Middleton May, an accountant. Her father was born in New York City and raised in England, and her mother was also a native New Yorker. She has a younger brother named Geoffrey. Her mother was a prominent anti-nuclear activist and her father was Assistant Vice President of Aetna Life and Casualty.

In 1972, the family relocated to Margaree Harbour, Nova Scotia, after a visit to Cape Breton Island. There, they purchased and operated a converted schooner, the Marion Elizabeth, as a gift shop and restaurant until 2002. May relinquished her U.S. citizenship in 1978, when she became a Canadian citizen, in accordance with American nationality law at the time.

May attended St. Francis Xavier University in rural Nova Scotia, but dropped out. Returning to Margaree Harbour, May took correspondence courses in restaurant management. Beginning in 1980, she attended Dalhousie University in Halifax, graduating in 1983 with a degree in law. May later studied theology at Saint Paul University, a federated college of the University of Ottawa, but withdrew from the program due to conflicting schedule demands.

== Environmental activism and legal career ==
=== Early activism ===
May first became known in the Canadian media in the mid-1970s through her leadership as a volunteer in the grassroots movement against proposed aerial insecticide spraying on forests near her home on Cape Breton Island. The effort prevented aerial insecticide spraying from ever occurring in Nova Scotia. Years later, she and a local group of residents went to court to prevent herbicide spraying. In 1982, they won a temporary injunction, halting the spray programme, but after two years, the case was eventually lost. Legal costs associated with the case resulted in her family sacrificing their home and seventy acres of land due to litigation from Scott Paper. However, by the time the judge ruled the chemicals were safe, 2,4,5-T's export from the U.S. had been banned. The forests of Nova Scotia were spared from being the last areas in Canada to be sprayed with Agent Orange.

In 1980, May and others launched a political party to raise environmental and anti-nuclear issues dubbed "the Small Party". The party ran 12 candidates in six provinces in the 1980 federal election. May, at the time a 25-year-old waitress, ran against the former Deputy Prime Minister, Allan J. MacEachen in Cape Breton Highlands—Canso. She placed last out of four candidates receiving 272 votes.

=== Legal work ===
Following her graduation from Dalhousie University, May worked as an environmental lawyer in Halifax. In 1985, May moved to Ottawa to work with the Public Interest Advocacy Centre. She held the position of Associate General Counsel, representing consumer, poverty and environmental groups from 1985 to 1986.

In 1986, May was named Senior Policy Advisor to Thomas McMillan, then-Minister of the Environment in the Progressive Conservative Mulroney government. As senior policy advisor, May was involved in the negotiation of the Montreal Protocol, an international treaty designed to protect the ozone layer. She was instrumental in the creation of several national parks, including South Moresby. In 1988, May resigned on principle after permits were granted for the Rafferty-Alameda Dams in Saskatchewan without proper environmental assessment. The permits were later struck down by a Federal Court decision that found that the permits had been granted illegally.

May helped found the Canadian Environmental Defence Fund with the aim of funding groups and individuals in environmental cases. She has worked with Indigenous peoples internationally, particularly in the Amazon rainforest, as well as with First Nations in Canada. She was the first volunteer executive director of Cultural Survival Canada from 1989 to 1992 and worked for the Algonquian of Barriere Lake from 1991 to 1992.

She has taught courses at Queen's University School of Policy Studies, and was the first holder of the Elizabeth May Chair in Women's Health and Environment at Dalhousie University in 1998.

=== Sierra Club of Canada ===
In 1989, May became the founding executive director of the Sierra Club of Canada. During her tenure with the Sierra Club of Canada, May received several awards in recognition of her environmental leadership, including: the International Conservation Award from the Friends of Nature, the United Nations Global 500 Award in 1990, the award for Outstanding Leadership in Environmental Education by the Ontario Society for Environmental Education in 1996, and in November 2005 was made an Officer of the Order of Canada in recognition of her "decades of leadership in the Canadian environmental movement".

In April 2006, May announced her resignation as the Sierra Club's executive director. Upon leaving the Sierra Club, Board President Louise Comeau noted, "Elizabeth has led the Club at the national level from its infancy to the enormously effective entity it is today."

== Political career ==
=== Early leadership ===
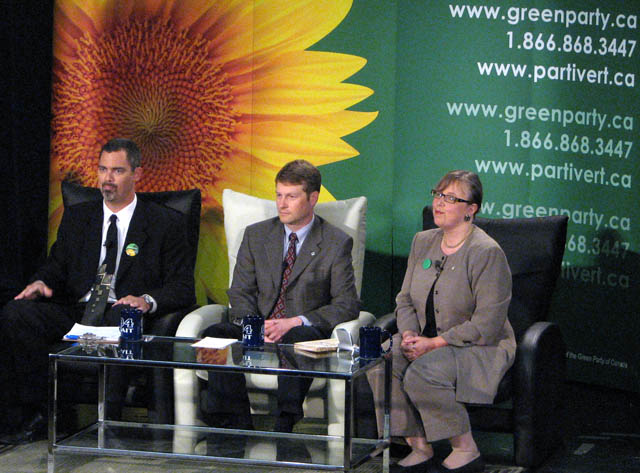
May (right foreground) at the 2006 Green Party of Canada leadership debate

On May 9, 2006, May entered the Green Party of Canada's leadership race.

On August 26, 2006, May won the leadership election on the first ballot. She tallied 65.3% of the votes, beating her main rival, David Chernushenko (33.3%) and Jim Fannon (0.88%). She said one of the main platforms for the next election would be to renegotiate the North American Free Trade Agreement (NAFTA). At the time of her election as leader, May said she intended to run in the riding of Cape Breton—Canso in the next federal election, although she also said she would stand in a federal byelection if one occurred prior to the next general election. In the fall of 2006, May ran for election in London North Centre, finishing second to Glen Pearson of the Liberal Party. While she lost, May's showing in this by-election was the best result, in terms of percentage, achieved by the Green Party of Canada at that time.

In April 2007, during a speech by May to a London, Ontario United Church of Canada, she condemned Prime Minister Stephen Harper's stance on climate change, comparing it to "a grievance worse than Neville Chamberlain's appeasement of the Nazis." The statement drew criticism from the Canadian Jewish Congress and opposition parties. While Opposition leader Stéphane Dion refused to respond to Harper's request for him to distance himself from May and these remarks during Question Period, Dion did state to reporters outside Commons that May should withdraw the remarks, and that the Nazi regime is beyond any comparison.

May said she was having "a lousy week" because of the federal government's weak action plan on the environment, but stood by her comments. In a Green Party of Canada press release, May stated that she was referencing a Chamberlain Nazi appeasement analogy made by journalist George Monbiot a few days earlier saying "I made reference to Mr. Monbiot's statement to highlight the damage being done to Canada's international reputation, something that should concern all Canadians."

On March 17, 2007, May announced that she would run in the Nova Scotia riding of Central Nova, in the 2008 federal election. The riding was held by Conservative National Defence Minister Peter MacKay. May has explained that she chose Central Nova to avoid running against a Liberal or NDP incumbent.

On April 12, 2007, Liberal Party leader Stéphane Dion announced that the Liberals would not run a candidate in Central Nova in return for the Greens not running a candidate in Dion's safe Saint-Laurent—Cartierville riding. There was criticism from prominent Green Party members of May's failing to support all Green candidates unequivocally during the 2008 election, as she made favourable comments about Liberal leader Stéphane Dion and said that supporters in close ridings might consider voting strategically to attempt to defeat the Conservatives.

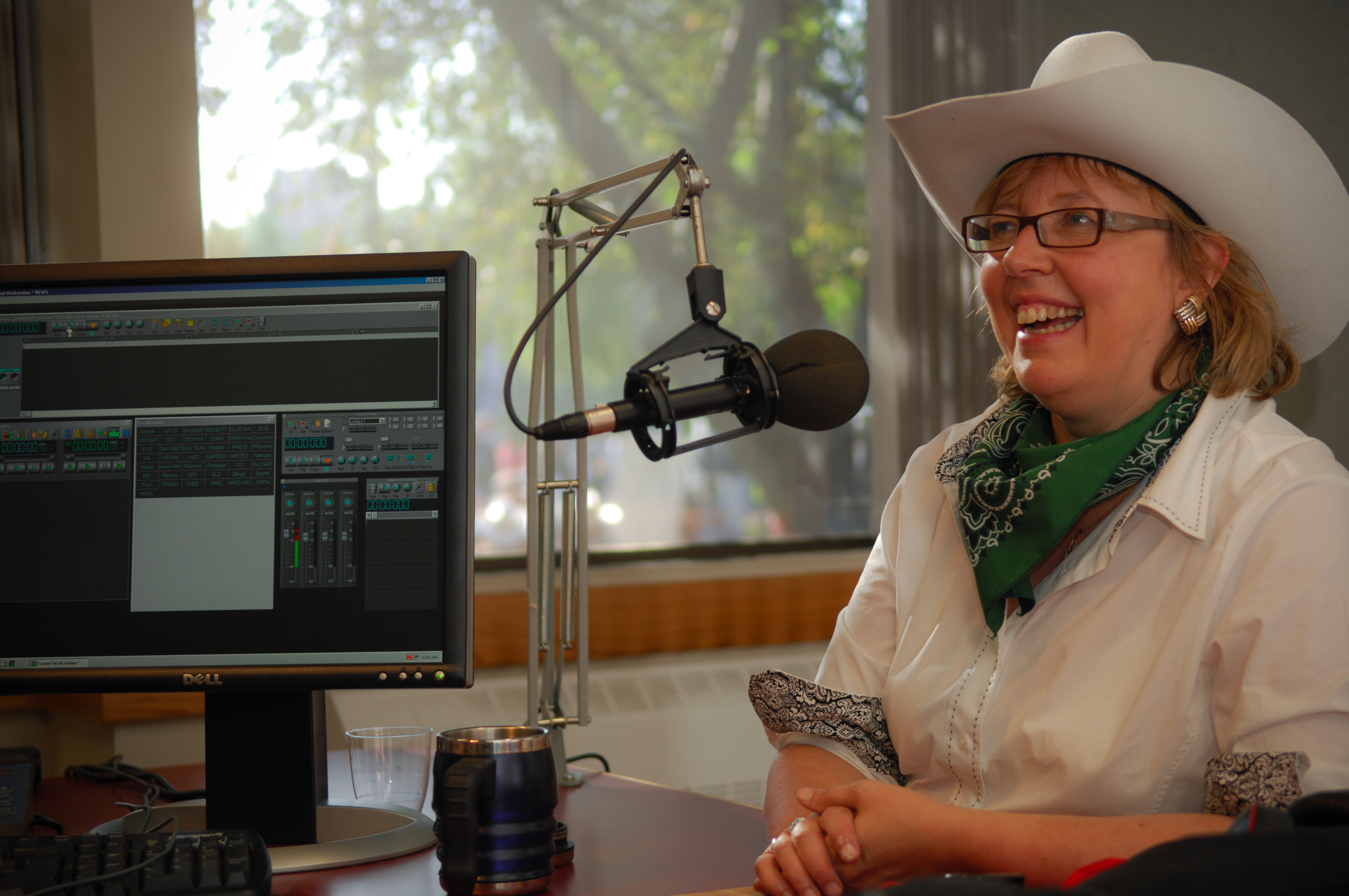
May speaking on a CBC Radio broadcast, July 2008

May was initially excluded from the televised national leadership debate in the 2008 federal election, based on the lack of any elected Green party MPs. She argued that the TV network consortium's initial exclusion of the Green Party of Canada was "anti-democratic" and blamed it on "the decision-making of a small group of TV network executives". Eventually May was invited to attend the televised debate.

May received 32 per cent of the vote in Central Nova in 2008 to MacKay's 47 per cent. Nationally, the Greens received 6.8 per cent of the popular vote.

=== Member of Parliament ===
In 2010, following a survey of potentially favourable electoral districts across the country, May announced her intention to run in Saanich—Gulf Islands, in British Columbia against Conservative cabinet minister Gary Lunn.

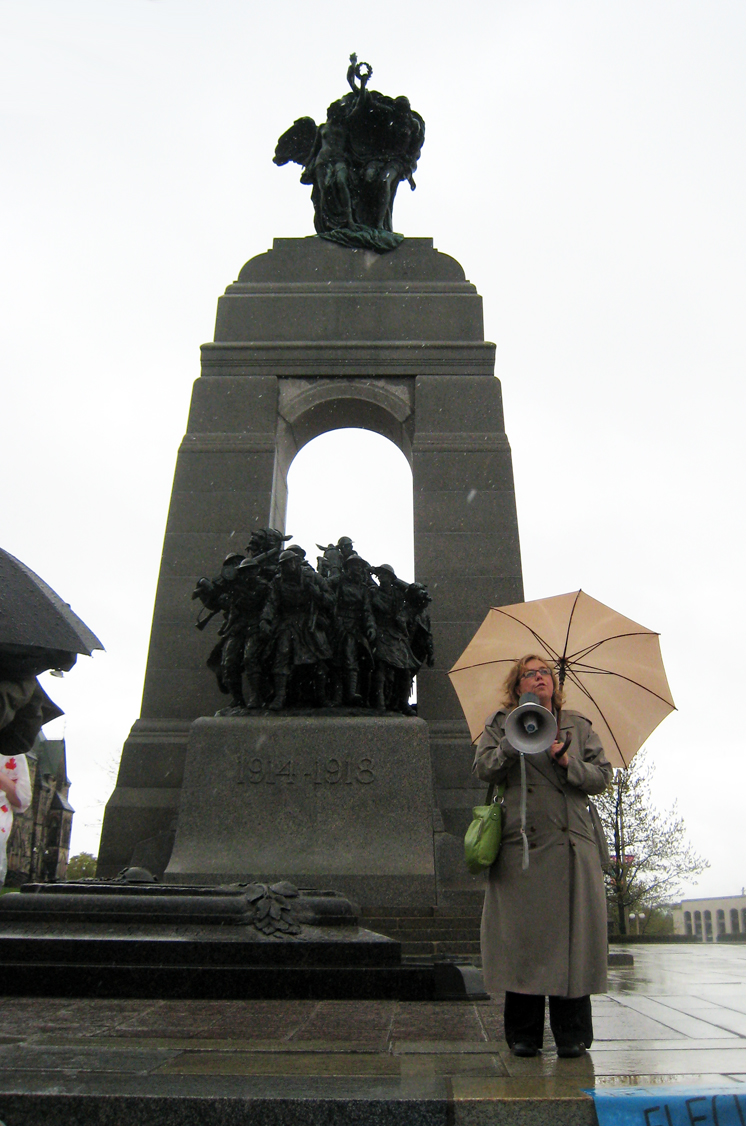
May speaks at the Fair Vote Canada National Day of Action in Ottawa, May 2011

On March 29, 2011, the broadcast consortium organizing the televised national leaders' debate for the 2011 federal election announced that it would not invite May. Despite her exclusion from the national debates, she won her riding, defeating the incumbent Gary Lunn. Nationally the Greens received 4 per cent of the popular vote.

In 2012, May tabled a Private member's bill, Bill C-442, with the aim of creating a national framework to address Lyme disease. On December 16, 2014, Bill C-442 received royal assent, becoming law. Bill C-442 was the first piece of Green Party legislation enacted in the history of Canada, and was passed with unanimous consent by both houses of Parliament.

The bill was introduced by May in response to the rise of lyme disease across Canada, and in recognition of the findings by groups including the Intergovernmental Panel on Climate Change, who have noted that as a result of climate change Lyme disease is beginning to spread more quickly, as the number of ticks— who serve as vectors for Lyme disease– steadily increases.

In December 2014, May presented a petition to the House of Commons by members of 9/11 Truth organizations asking the government to review the September 11 attacks in New York. While she personally did not agree with the petition, May defended presenting it and stated "It is an obligation of an MP to present every petition submitted to them." While many MPs consider it a responsibility, House of Commons rules do not require MPs to present all petitions they receive to Parliament. In 2012, the NDP Foreign Affairs Critic Paul Dewar declined to present a similar petition by another 9/11 Truth group to parliament.

Annually, Maclean's Magazine organizes an awards ceremony in which MPs recognize the achievements and hard work of their colleagues. In 2012, May was voted by her colleagues in the House of Commons as Parliamentarian of the Year, in 2013 she was voted Hardest Working MP, and in 2014 she was voted Best Orator.

May was the first MP to take a stand against Bill C-51, on February 3, 2015, Toronto Star National Affairs columnist Thomas Walkom noted that, "So far, the only opposition MP with enough guts to critique the content of the Conservative government's new anti-terror bill is Green Party Leader Elizabeth May." May and fellow Green MP Bruce Hyer tabled sixty amendments during clause-by-clause considerations of Bill C-51 – all sixty amendments were rejected by the government. May later stated of Bill C-51, "It's not fixable. Stop it. Repeal it."

On April 23, 2015, May had two amendments to Bill C-46, the Pipelines Safety Act, accepted. These were the first Green Party amendments to a government bill ever adopted. The first amendment enabled "aboriginal governing bodies to be reimbursed for actions they take in relation to a spill". Prior to the amendment, the bill outlined that those at fault in a spill would only be liable for "costs and expenses reasonably incurred by Her Majesty in right of Canada or a province or any other person". The second amendment was related to the concept of polluter pays. The original line in the bill said that the National Energy Board "may" recover funds to compensate those affected by a spill, the Green Party amendment changed the "may" to "shall".

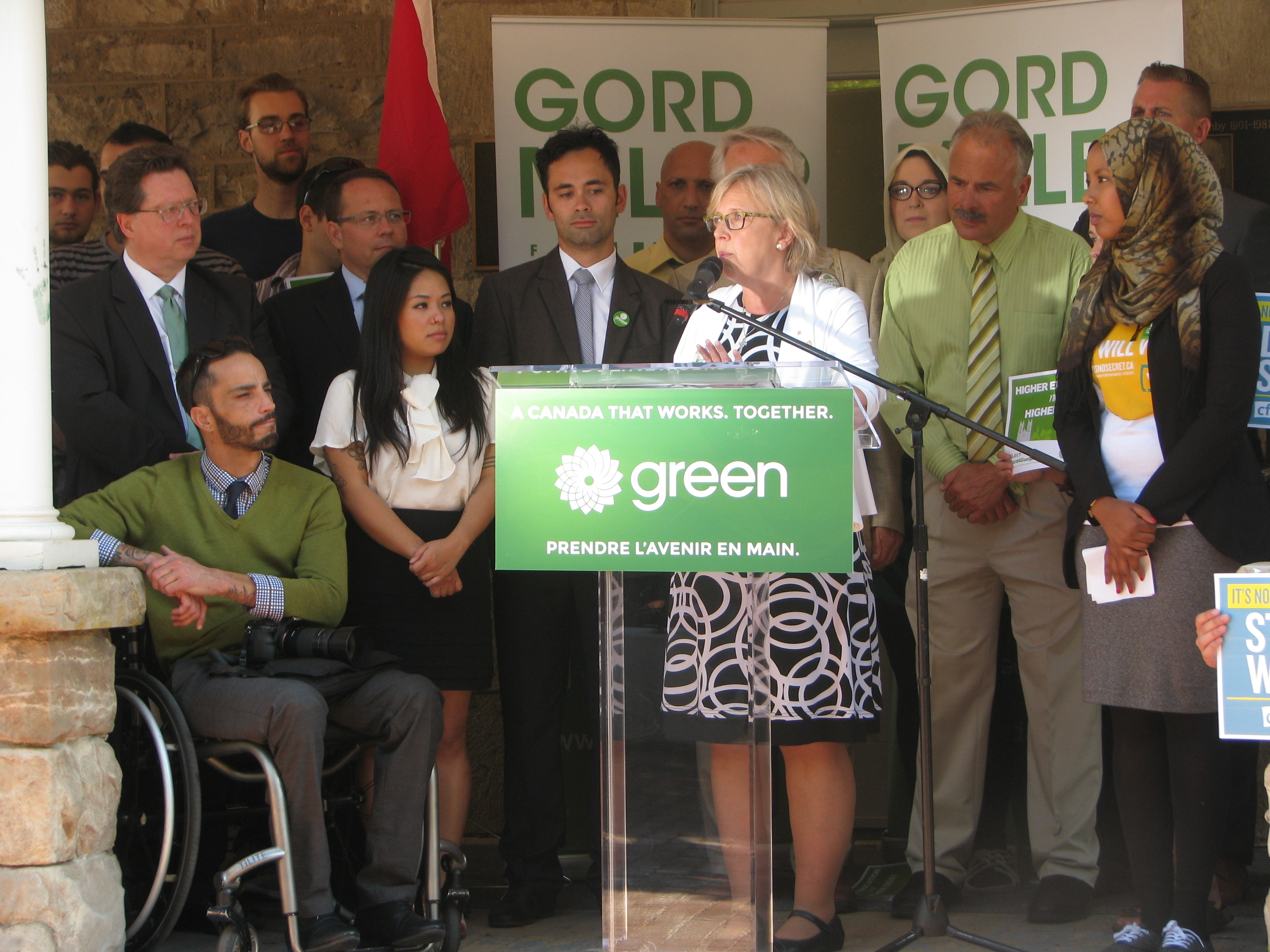
May announcing the Green Party's educational policy during the 2015 Canadian federal election campaign

In October 2015, Prime Minister-designate Justin Trudeau invited May to be part of the Canadian delegation to the 2015 United Nations Climate Change Conference to be held in Paris, France, in late November 2015; the summit was intended to negotiate post-2020 targets for reducing greenhouse gas emissions and resulted in the GHGPPA. According to Maclean's, "May, who requested and received a 30-minute meeting with Trudeau this week even as he was immersed in transition plans for swearing in a new Liberal government on Nov. 4, said his willingness to engage with opposition parties is also encouraging, suggesting a less hyper-partisan style of governing." In 2016, May gained international media attention for objecting to Conservative MP Michelle Rempel using the word "fart" in a speech in the House of Commons.

On March 23, 2018, May was arrested for civil contempt during a demonstration against the Kinder Morgan pipeline. Other members of the demonstration, including fellow Member of Parliament Kennedy Stewart, were also arrested concerning the same incident. They were accused of violating a court order requiring those demonstrating to stay five meters back from company work sites, when they allegedly blocked the roadway. On April 9, 2018, Justice Kenneth Affleck of the British Columbia Supreme Court recommended that May and the others arrested should be charged with criminal contempt in relation to the alleged incident. On April 16, 2018, it was reported that special prosecutors would be overseeing the charges against May and Stewart. On May 14, 2018, the special prosecutor handling May's case told Justice Affleck that the province was pursuing a criminal contempt of court prosecution against May. On May 28, 2018, May pleaded guilty to criminal contempt of court and was sentenced to pay a fine of $1,500. May has called for a doubling of Canada's greenhouse gas emission reduction targets to a 60% reduction from 2005 levels, instead of the current 30%.

=== Second leadership ===
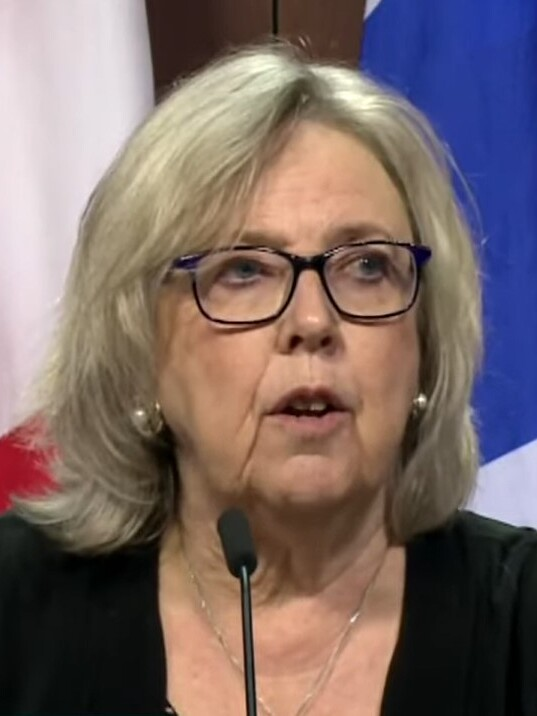
May speaking at a press conference, June 2024

After Annamie Paul, May's successor as Green Party leader, resigned following a period of internal tensions within the party and a poor performance in the 2021 Canadian federal election, May announced she would run in the leadership election to replace her. Running on a joint ticket with human rights activist Jonathan Pedneault and proposing that the party adopt a co-leadership model, May won the leadership election on November 19, 2022. As co-leadership is not formally recognized in the party’s constitution, and Pedneault served as May's deputy leader while the two sought to amend the party constitution. The proposed constitutional change was not approved due to internal disagreement and on July 9, 2024, Jonathan Pedneault resigned as deputy leader, citing personal reasons. May said she regretted the decision but confirmed that she planned to continue as leader into the 2025 Canadian federal election, and run for re-election in her Vancouver Island riding. Pedneault returned in January 2025 to serve as co-leader, pending election by party membership, which was approved on February 4, 2025. In the 2025 election, May won re-election in her riding of Saanich—Gulf Islands, becoming the party's sole representative in Parliament. On August 19, May announced her intention to resign as party leader and not lead the party into the next federal election. She voted in favour of the 2025 federal budget, helping it pass. May later stated her regret in supporting the budget.

== Controversies ==
=== Stance on abortion ===
During a visit in 2006 to the Mount St. Joseph's Convent in London, Ontario, May responded to a nun's question about her position on abortion, saying "I don't think a woman has a frivolous right to choose. What I don't want is a desperate woman to die in an illegal abortion." Following initial reports of May's statements, which did not include the full quote, prominent Canadian feminist Judy Rebick announced that she was withdrawing her previous support of May and the Green Party because of May's questioning "the most important victory of the women's movement of my generation". May later clarified that she had been trying to explain to the nuns how "their belief in right to life means that they should support abortion". She explained that making abortions illegal would cause more deaths from desperate illegal abortions, as had been the case for hundreds of years previously.

In a 2011 interview with the Georgia Straight, May said her position had been "massively misreported" and explained "If a woman is in a situation where she’d like to keep her child and needs support, we also want to be there to support that choice and also to ensure that as much as possible we, in our society, provide—not just for women, but for male partners—responsibility, birth-control information in order to avoid unwanted pregnancies … So, it’s a mixed and nuanced position, but there’s absolutely no wiggle room on maintaining the right of women in this country to safe and legal abortions." She stressed that there is "no going back" on the issue, and that she is "very militant" about it.

May was interviewed by a CBC videographer that was published two days prior to the start of the 2019 federal election. May stated that the Green Party would not ban elected MPs from reopening the abortion debate. May's reasoning was that despite her own personal pro-choice views, Green Party rules do not give her the power as leader to whip votes in caucus. This position put the Greens in stark contrast to the Liberals and the NDP, both of which require attestations from MPs that they will consistently support the party's stated pro-choice platform. The Green Party released an official statement clarifying May's comments, saying that candidates are prescreened to rule out anti-abortion viewpoints, but that May's initial statement regarding the leader not having the power to whip votes remains official Green Party policy. May later backed away from the comments, saying that any Green MP who moved to re-open the debate would risk being removed from caucus.

=== Pseudoscience ===
In November 2011, May tweeted concerns about the possible dangers of WiFi. May's comments that WiFi was a "possible human carcinogen" and that the use of WiFi might be related to the "disappearance of pollinating insects" fuelled attacks over the scientific soundness of her views. "It is very disturbing how quickly Wi-Fi has moved into schools as it is children who are the most vulnerable", she wrote. The National Post pointed out that May had ironically made the tweets on her cellphone.

In June 2013, during a Twitter exchange with May, a Green Party critic downloaded the party's platform and found reference to the party's support of government-subsidized homeopathy. Homeopathy found its way into the platform "by accident", May later said.

=== In defence of Jian Ghomeshi ===
In October 2014, May sent out a series of tweets defending Jian Ghomeshi, who faced allegations from three women that the radio host was physically violent to them without their consent during sexual encounters. "I think Jian is wonderful. Likely TMI for an old fogey like me, but his private life is none of our beeswax", May wrote. May then wrote, "I have known Jian and something at work here doesn't make sense. Innocent until proven guilty." When one user accused her of buying into "rape culture," she replied, "As a feminist, I do not buy into rape culture." May later stated that she regretted defending Ghomeshi, stating that she had not yet read about the allegations of physical violence in the Toronto Star and that she was still "shaken up" by the Parliament Hill shootings when she wrote the tweets.

=== 2015 Press Gallery Dinner speech ===
At the Parliamentary Press Gallery's dinner in Gatineau, Quebec, on May 9, 2015, May said "Welcome back, Omar Khadr. It matters to say it. Welcome back, Omar Khadr. You're home", in reference to Omar Khadr, a convicted child soldier. She added, "Omar Khadr, you've got more class than the whole fucking cabinet", before being escorted off the stage by Transport Minister Lisa Raitt. Early in her speech she also questioned why no one else had mentioned the event was being held on First Nations territory, asking "What the fuck is wrong with the rest of you?"

May later blamed her actions on fatigue and denied accusations that she had drunk excessively. "I didn't have a lot of wine," she said, "but it may have hit me harder than I thought it would". When asked if she should resign, she said that "a lot of people have given bad press gallery speeches and have gone on to be Prime Minister or gone on to lead other aspects of their lives, time will tell." President of the Treasury Board Tony Clement and NDP House Leader Peter Julian said that her apology was sufficient. Laura Peck, senior partner at TransformLeaders.ca, said, "She has apologized. She's done the right thing, she's apologized".

Other senior members of the media questioned why the speech had received so much attention from the press. CBC's Michael Enright noted that the Press Gallery Dinner has long been home to rowdy behaviour by both politicians and journalists, usually attracting little coverage. In his Sunday Edition segment, Enright even pondered, "Why the mountain of coverage, nearly all of it unsympathetic? Was it because she was appearing before a roomful of journalists? Would the story have disappeared if she had been speaking to environmentalists? Was it because she sometimes has seemed to be holier than thou? Was it because she is a woman? Whatever the reason, May was mugged by the media."

== Personal life ==
May has one daughter with former partner Ian Burton, Victoria Cate May Burton, who was the Green candidate in Berthier—Maskinongé in 2015, losing to NDP incumbent Ruth Ellen Brosseau.

On November 27, 2018, May announced her engagement to John Kidder, brother of actress Margot Kidder and one of the founders of the Green Party of British Columbia. Kidder had previously run as the 2011 federal Liberal candidate in Okanagan—Coquihalla and as the 2013 BC Green candidate in Fraser-Nicola. May and Kidder married on April 22, 2019, at Christ Church Cathedral in Victoria, British Columbia.

May is a practising Anglican, and has said she is "interested, in the long term, in becoming ordained as an Anglican priest." She cites Jesus Christ as her personal hero, because "he led a revolution that was non-violent".

At the time of the 2025 Canadian federal election, she lived in Sidney, British Columbia.

== Honours and awards ==
- International Conservation Award from Friends of Nature, 1985
- Commemorative Medal for the 125th Anniversary of the Confederation of Canada, in recognition of significant contribution to compatriots, community and to Canada, 1992
- Elizabeth May Chair in Women's Health and the Environment, Dalhousie University, 1998.
- Honorary Doctorate of Humane Letters (DHumL), Mount Saint Vincent University, 2000.
- Harkin Award from the Canadian Parks and Wilderness Society for her lifetime achievement in promoting the protection of Canada's wilderness, 2002
- Best Activist Award, Coast Magazine, Best of Halifax Readers' Poll, 2002
- Honorary Doctorate of Laws, University of New Brunswick, 2003.
- United Nations Global 500 award.
- Officer of the Order of Canada, 2005.
- Couchiching Award for Excellence in Public Policy, 2006
- Honorary Doctorate of Laws, Mount Allison University, 2007.
- Newsweek magazine: One of World's Most Influential Women, November 28, 2010
- Maclean's Parliamentarian of the Year, 2012
- Awarded the Canadian Version of the Queen Elizabeth II Diamond Jubilee Medal in 2012
- Maclean's Hardest Working Parliamentarian of the Year, 2013
- Maclean's Best Orator of the Year, 2014
- Honorary Doctor of Divinity (D.D.), Atlantic School of Theology, 2015.
- Maclean's Most Knoweldgeable Parliamentarian of the Year, 2020

== Electoral record ==
=== Summary ===
Electoral history of Elizabeth May — Federal general elections
Year	Party	Votes			Seats		Position
Year	Party	Total	%	±%	Total	±	Position
2008	Green	937,613	6.78%	+2.30	0 / 308	–	No seats
2011	Green	576,221	3.91%	-2.87	1 / 308	+1	No status
2015	Green	602,933	3.43%	-0.49	1 / 338	–	No status
2019	Green	1,189,607	6.55%	+3.07	3 / 338	+2	No status
2025 (Note: Serving as co-leader with Jonathan Pedneault.)	Green	238,892	1.22%	-1.11	1 / 343	-1	No status

Electoral history of Elizabeth — Federal constituency elections
Year	Type	Riding	Party	Votes for May				Result	Swing
Year	Type	Riding	Party	Total	%	P.	±%	Result	Swing
1980	General election	Cape Breton Highlands—Canso	Independent	272	0.75%	4th	n/a	Lost	Hold
2006	By-election	London North Centre	Green	9,864	25.87%	2nd	+20.38	Lost	Hold
2008	General election	Central Nova	Green	12,620	32.24%	2nd	+30.65	Lost	Hold
2011	General election	Saanich—Gulf Islands	Green	31,890	46.33%	1st	+35.88	Elected	Gain
2015	General election	Saanich—Gulf Islands	Green	37,070	54.40	1st	+7.99	Elected	Hold
2019	General election	Saanich—Gulf Islands	Green	33,454	49.09%	1st	-5.31	Elected	Hold
2021	General election	Saanich—Gulf Islands	Green	24,648	37.62%	1st	-11.47	Elected	Hold
2025	General election	Saanich—Gulf Islands	Green	31,199	39.10%	1st	+3.33	Elected	Hold

=== Federal elections ===
2025 Canadian federal election: Saanich—Gulf Islands
Party	Candidate	Votes	%	±%	Expenditures
Green	Elizabeth May	31,199	39.10	+3.33	$141,917.72
Liberal	David Beckham	25,409	31.85	+13.04	$102,877.53
Conservative	Cathie Ounsted	20,015	25.09	+2.44	$142,555.14
New Democratic	Colin Plant	3,163	3.96	–15.59	$46,746.99
Total valid votes/expense limit		79,786	99.58	–	$147,255.57
Total rejected ballots		336	0.42	–0.15	
Turnout		80,122	77.87	+7.99	
Eligible voters		102,890			
Green notional hold		Swing		–4.86	
Source: Elections Canada

2021 Canadian federal election: Saanich—Gulf Islands
Party	Candidate	Votes	%	±%	Expenditures
Green	Elizabeth May	24,648	37.62	–11.47	$83,311.07
Conservative	David Busch	14,775	22.55	+2.32	$85,537.45
Liberal	Sherri Moore-Arbour	12,056	18.40	+1.78	$46,863.06
New Democratic	Sabina Singh	11,959	18.25	+5.55	$44,510.15
People's	David Hilderman	1,943	2.97	+1.60	none listed
Communist	Dock Currie	141	0.22	–	none listed
Total valid votes/expense limit		65,522	99.43	–	$121,248.58
Total rejected ballots		374	0.57	+0.10	
Turnout		65,896	69.88	–4.74	
Eligible voters		94,293			
Green hold		Swing		–6.90	
Source: Elections Canada

2019 Canadian federal election: Saanich—Gulf Islands
Party	Candidate	Votes	%	±%	Expenditures
Green	Elizabeth May	33,454	49.09	–5.31	$88,298.61
Conservative	David Busch	13,784	20.23	+0.77	$105,104.12
Liberal	Ryan Windsor	11,326	16.62	–0.08	$74,433.20
New Democratic	Sabina Singh	8,657	12.70	+3.63	$22,817.36
People's	Ron Broda	929	1.36	–	$4,319.38
Total valid votes/expense limit		68,150	99.53	–	$115,731.00
Total rejected ballots		323	0.47	+0.18	
Turnout		68,473	74.63	–4.05	
Eligible voters		91,752			
Green hold		Swing		–3.04	
Source: Elections Canada

2015 Canadian federal election: Saanich—Gulf Islands
Party	Candidate	Votes	%	±%	Expenditures
Green	Elizabeth May	37,070	54.40	+7.99	$191,615.15
Conservative	Robert Boyd	13,260	19.46	–17.02	$148,289.09
Liberal	Tim Kane	11,380	16.70	+10.64	$51,446.10
New Democratic	Alicia Cormier	6,181	9.07	–1.97	$53,257.32
Libertarian	Meghan Jess Porter	249	0.37	–	$231.52
Total valid votes/expense limit		68,140	99.71	–	$223,670.30
Total rejected ballots		201	0.29	+0.06	
Turnout		68,341	78.68	+4.80	
Eligible voters		86,863			
Green hold		Swing		+12.50	
Source: Elections Canada

2011 Canadian federal election: Saanich—Gulf Islands
Party	Candidate	Votes	%	±%	Expenditures
Green	Elizabeth May	31,890	46.33	+35.87	$87,583.86
Conservative	Gary Lunn	24,544	35.66	–7.76	$88,362.18
New Democratic	Edith Loring-Kuhanga	8,185	11.89	+6.20	$66,065.05
Liberal	Renée Hetherington	4,208	6.11	–33.24	$48,563.16
Total valid votes/expense limit		68,827	99.77	–	$95,460.07
Total rejected ballots		160	0.23	–0.05	
Turnout		68,987	73.88	+3.48	
Eligible voters		93,380			
Green gain from Conservative		Swing		+21.82	
Source: Elections Canada

2008 Canadian federal election: Central Nova
Party	Candidate	Votes	%	±%	Expenditures
Conservative	Peter MacKay	18,240	46.60	+5.94	$61,468.89
Green	Elizabeth May	12,620	32.24	+30.65	$57,490.60
New Democratic	Louise Lorifice	7,659	19.56	-13.33	$39,917.36
Christian Heritage	Michael Harris MacKay	427	1.09	–	none listed
Canadian Action	Paul Kemp	196	0.50	–	$87.79
Total valid votes/expense limit		39,142	100.0		$80,462
Total rejected, unmarked and declined ballots		304	0.77	+0.42	
Turnout		39,446	67.01	-2.16	
Eligible voters		58,863			
Conservative hold		Swing		-24.71	

Canadian federal by-election, November 27, 2006: London North Centre Resignation of Joe Fontana
Party	Candidate	Votes	%	±%
Liberal	Glen Pearson	13,287	34.85	−5.27
Green	Elizabeth May	9,864	25.87	+20.38
Conservative	Dianne Haskett	9,309	24.42	−5.48
New Democratic	Megan Walker	5,388	14.13	−9.62
Progressive Canadian	Steven Hunter	145	0.38	−0.09
Independent	Robert Ede	77	0.20	–
Canadian Action	Will Arlow	53	0.14	–
Total		38,123	100.00	

1980 Canadian federal election: Cape Breton Highlands—Canso
Party	Candidate	Votes	%	±%
Liberal	Allan J. MacEachen	18,262	50.40%	+2.30%
Progressive Conservative	Bill Kelly	12,799	35.32%	−3.44%
New Democratic	William J. Woodfine	4,902	13.53%	+0.39%
Independent	Elizabeth May	272	0.75%	*

== Selected works ==
- Budworm battles: the fight to stop the aerial insecticide spraying of the forests of eastern Canada (with Richard E.L. Rogers). 1982. Four East Publications. ISBN 0-9690041-5-X
- Paradise Won: the struggle for South Moresby. 1990. McClelland & Stewart. ISBN 0-7710-5772-5
- Frederick Street: life and death on Canada's Love Canal (with Maude Barlow). 2000. HarperCollins Publishers. ISBN 0-00-200036-9 - focused on the Sydney Tar Ponds, and the health threats to children in the community – the issue that led her to go on a seventeen-day hunger strike in May 2001 in front of Parliament Hill.
- At the cutting edge: the crisis in Canada's forests. 2005. Key Porter Books. ISBN 1-55263-645-3
- How to Save the World in Your Spare Time. 2006. Key Porter Books. ISBN 1-55263-781-6
- Global Warming for Dummies (with Zoe Caron). 2008. Wiley & Sons Publishing. ISBN 0-470-84098-6
- Losing Confidence: Power, Politics And The Crisis In Canadian Democracy. 2009. McClelland & Stewart. ISBN 0-7710-5760-1
- Who We Are: Reflections on My Life and Canada (Greystone, 2014)

== See also ==
- List of Green party leaders in Canada
- 2008 Canadian federal election
