= 2006 Green Party of Canada leadership election =

Canadian political party leadership election

- August 24–27, 2006
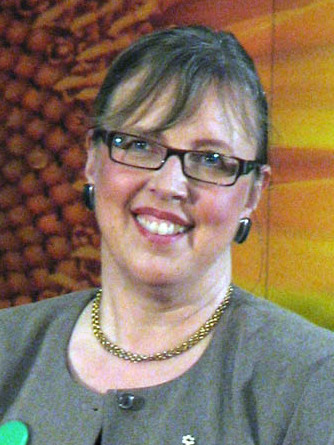

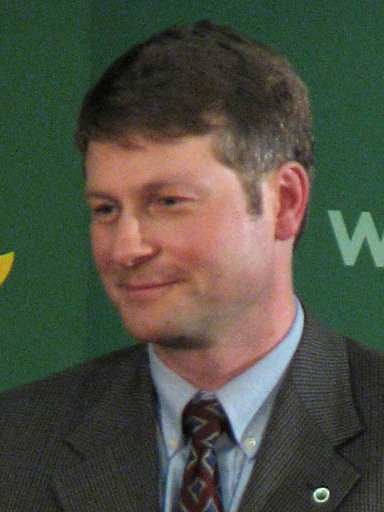
| Candidate | Elizabeth May | David Chernushenko |
| Popular vote | 2,145 | 1,096 |
| Percentage | 65.34% | 33.38% |
Leader before election
Jim Harris
Elected Leader
Elizabeth May

2006 Green Party leadership election
- Date: August 24–27, 2006
- Convention: Ottawa, Ontario
- Resigning leader: Jim Harris
- Won by: Elizabeth May
- Candidates: 3
- Entrance fee: $2,000 ($1,000 refundable)
- Spending limit: $50,000

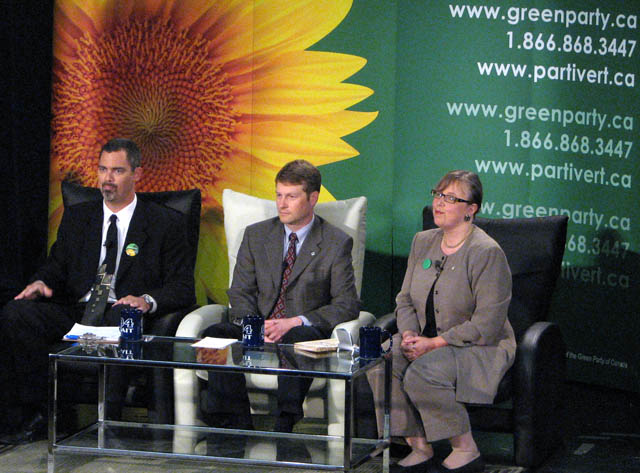
The candidates at the June 21, 2006, leadership debate in Calgary.

On March 29, 2006 it was announced, in accordance with the Green Party of Canada constitution that there would be a leadership election held August 24–27, 2006 in Ottawa.

Leadership contests in the party were automatically held every two years (every four years under the new constitution, beginning 2006), and every member of the party is entitled to vote, whether or not they attend the convention. The party mails out ballots to all members to be returned for counting. This voting system also applies to council members and policy changes as well.

On April 24, 2006, incumbent party leader Jim Harris announced he would not be running for re-election. The race was won by Elizabeth May on August 26, 2006.

== Timeline ==
=== 2006 ===
- March 29 – Bruce Abel, GPC Chair announces the leadership contest.
- March 30 – David Chernushenko announces his candidacy.
- April 26 – Jim Harris announces he will be stepping down as leader.
- May 9 – Elizabeth May announces her candidacy.
- May 31 – Nominations for party leader close with three registered candidates.
- June 14 – French-language leadership candidates' debate in Montreal.
- June 21 – English-language leadership candidates' debate in Calgary.
- August 24 – Beginning of leadership and policy convention in Ottawa.
- August 26 – Party leadership vote at convention.
- August 27 – End of leadership and policy convention.

== Rules ==
Among other rules:

Each candidate must file a nomination form signed by 100 candidate nominators residing in 3 or more provinces or territories. Only 50 nominators are required if the candidate lives in a rural Electoral District as defined by Elections Canada.

Each candidate must pay a fully refundable $1,000 prospective contestant's deposit. Their campaign must also pay a non-refundable $1,000 contestant fee to cover party administration costs.

Each candidate may spend a maximum of $50,000 on their campaign.

Every registered member of the party can vote for the leader either at the convention, or by mail-in ballot.

== Registered candidates ==
Three candidates officially entered the leadership race before the close of nominations on May 31, 2006.

=== David Chernushenko ===
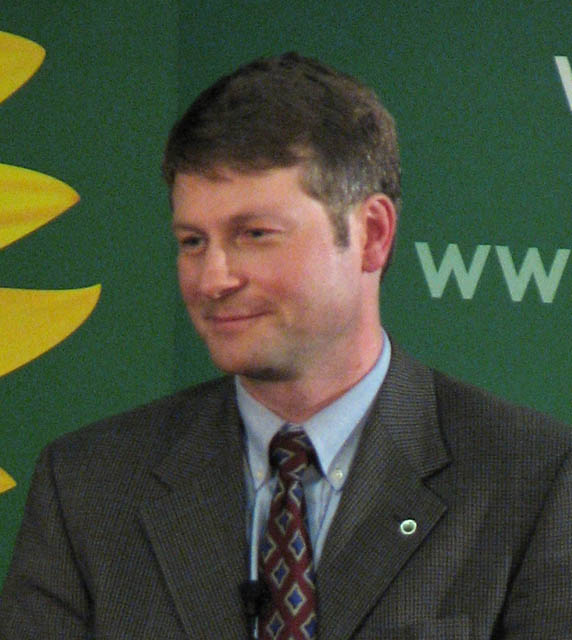

David Chernushenko was the party's Deputy Leader. He owns and operates Green & Gold Inc., a consulting firm specializing in suggesting ways to increase efficiency and reduce the negative environmental and social impacts of athletic events and facilities. He started Clean Air Champions, an advocacy group consisting primarily of athletes working to improve air quality in Canada.

Chernushenko was the Green Party candidate for Ottawa Centre in both the 2004 and 2006 general federal elections. In the 2006 election, he received 6,766 votes (10.2% of valid ballots cast) - the highest vote count of any Green Party candidate (though not the highest percentage of votes). By surpassing the 10% threshold, Chernushenko's campaign became eligible for a partial government reimbursement of campaign expenditures.

Chernushenko has twice been endorsed by the Ottawa Citizen. Chernushenko finished fourth in both the 2004 and 2006 races despite the endorsements.

David Chernushenko's nomination was confirmed by the party on May 16, 2006.

=== Elizabeth May ===
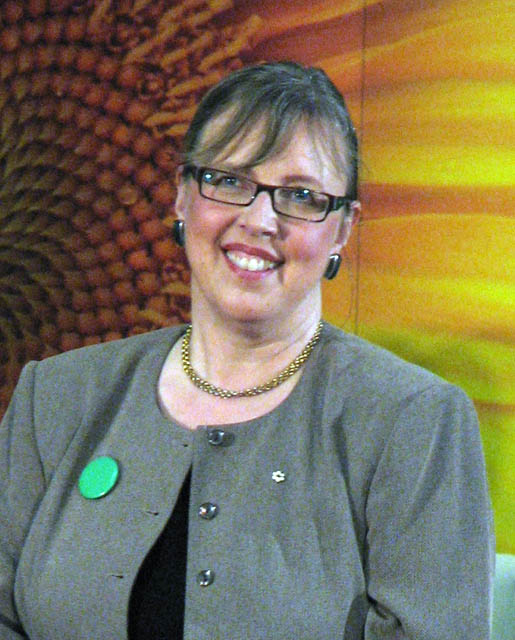

Elizabeth May, the former Executive Director of the Sierra Club of Canada, announced her run for the leadership on May 9, 2006. It had been widely speculated that she would enter. Other candidates including Claude Genest (who had already entered the race on February 2) had dropped out citing May's likely entry.

In her announcement, May emphasized that Canadian parties in general have failed to lead, and claimed that she would "never" come out sounding like she'd been "packaged" by anyone else. She cited the sexism of current Canadian politics, mentioning that "four men in suits" were debating issues of no significance, and that Canadians were expected to "become stupid" and behave as if they were at a "horse race" where the issues didn't matter at all.

Elizabeth May's campaign has had some issues raised about financing as reported on Public Eye Online. Basically, the article says that there was an error with May's website as it listed her tar sands tour as a campaign event. If the tour were a campaign event, the article claimed that then the expenses associated with the tour should be counted towards her $50,000 campaign limit.

May's supporters include Jim MacNeill, Secretary General of the World Commission on Environment and Development (the Brundtland Commission); Clifford Lincoln, former Minister of Environment for the Province of Quebec, and former Liberal Member of Parliament; Adriane Carr, Leader of the British Columbia Green Party; Peter Downie, former CBC broadcaster Claude Genest; prominent Green Party leader in Quebec; Sharon Labchuk, Leader of the Green Party of Prince Edward Island; Holly Dressel, co-author of several best selling books with Dr. David Suzuki; Senator Mira Spivak; Lynette Tremblay, Deputy Leader Green Party of Canada; Stephen Woollcombe, formerly an active Conservative Party member and a Progressive Conservative candidate in the federal elections of 2000; Victor Lau, Leader of the Green Party of Saskatchewan. Honorary Campaign Chair: Robert Bateman.

Elizabeth May's nomination was confirmed by the party on May 29, 2006.

=== Jim Fannon ===
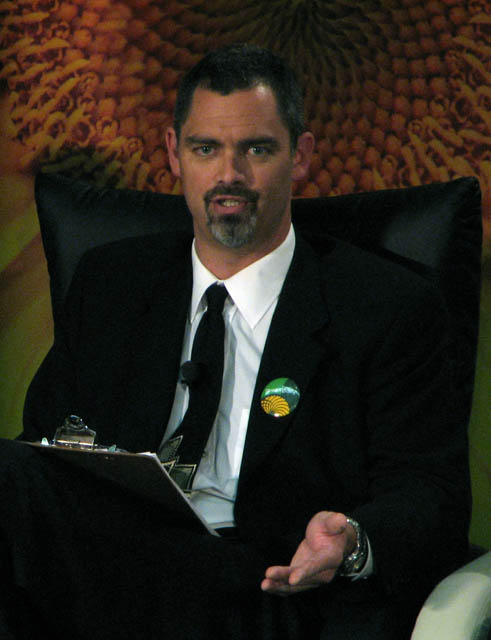

Jim Fannon is a real estate agent at RE/MAX Garden City Realty and founder of Nature's Hemp, a company that sells hemp seed, oil, nut, flour and protein powder. He is a former candidate for both the Green Party of Canada (1993, 2004, 2006) and Green Party of Ontario (2003).

Jim Fannon's nomination was confirmed by the party on May 31, 2006.

At the leadership convention, Fannon gave what The Globe and Mail called "one of the wackiest leadership speeches ever", constantly wiping sweat away from his face, thanking his mother and his dogsitter, and referring to his leadership opponent as "Elizabeth freakin' May".

== Results ==
The Green Party of Canada uses an instant-runoff voting ballot system for internal elections. The 2006 leadership election was decided on the following "first ballot" results:

First ballot results
| Candidate | Votes | Percentage |
|---|---|---|
| Elizabeth May | 2,145 | 65.34% |
| David Chernushenko | 1,096 | 33.38% |
| Jim Fannon | 29 | 0.88% |
| None of the above | 13 | 0.40% |
| Total | 3,283 | 100% |
