= Jack Frazer =

Canadian politician

Jack Frazer OMM MSC MP

Member of Parliament for Saanich—Gulf Islands
- In office 25 October 1993 – 1 June 1997
- Preceded by: Lynn Hunter
- Succeeded by: Gary Lunn

Personal details
- Born: 20 December 1931 Kamloops, British Columbia, Canada
- Died: 17 December 2012 (aged 80) Victoria, British Columbia, Canada
- Party: Reform
- Spouse: June Frazer
- Children: 4

John L. (Jack) Frazer OMM, MSC (20 December 1931 – 17 December 2012) was a member of the House of Commons of Canada from 1993 to 1997 who served in the Royal Canadian Air Force (RCAF). He was born in Kamloops, British Columbia.

In 1956, he married his first wife, Millicent June Black. After completing the Fighter Controller course at Tyndal Air force Base, Florida in America, Frazer was assigned to Fighter Controller duties in 1958, serving at Radar Stations in Mont Apica, Quebec and Edgar Ontario. In 1961, he was selected to join the RCAF's Golden Hawks aerobatic team at RCAF Chatham. Flying with the Golden Hawks in 1961 and 1962, he flew in air shows across Canada and the United States before being selected to fly the CF-104 Starfighter. After completing the Starfighter course at Cold Lake, Alberta, he was posted to RCAF Marville, France where he formed and commanded the 439 Reconnaissance Squadron on the CF-104 from 1964 to 1967. Reconnaissance Wing Marville (#1) achieved a first when they earned a #1 rating on their first NATO Tactical Evaluation, a performance they had previously never achieved. When Charles de Gaulle ordered NATO out of France and #1 Wing was to take over French Air Force Station Lahr, Germany, Frazer was named Commander of the Advance Party at Lahr. He later returned to Marville as Commander of the Rear Party, closing the Station there. Having completed the closure of Marville, Frazer returned to his duties as Deputy Operations Officer at RCAF Lahr which, earned a #1 rating on its subsequent NATO Tactical Evaluation.

In 1968, Major Frazer moved to the Canadian Forces Headquarters in Ottawa as Secretary to the Director General of Force Objectives. The following year, he was posted to Toronto to attend the RCAF Staff College. In 1970, he was posted to NATO Headquarters Allied Forces Northern Europe (HQ AFNORTH) at Kolsas, Norway as the Staff Officer Reconnaissance.

In 1973, he returned to CFB Chilliwack, B.C. as a Company Commander in the Canadian Forces Officer Candidate School and in 1974 was promoted Lieutenant Colonel to command the school.

In 1976, he was assigned as Base Operations Officer at CFB Cold Lake Alberta where he oversaw flying operations there and was responsible for instituting the first Operation Maple Flag, the multi-national exercise simulating an air war environment, which continues today. Posted to 25 NORAD Region Headquarters at Mchord Air Force Base, Tacoma Washington in 1979, Frazer assumed his duties as Assistant Deputy for Operations. A year later, he was promoted to Colonel and assigned as Base Commander and Deputy Commander #1 Canadian Air Group at CFB Baden Soellingen, Germany. In 1983, Frazer was posted to Harare, Zimbabwe where, as Military Advisor/Attaché, he was accredited to Zimbabwe, Mozambique, Tanzania, Kenya, Uganda and Botswana.

In 1985, while on a routine visit to Uganda, a Coup d'état occurred, deposing Milton Obote as president. After remaining in his hotel for four days, Frazer effected liaison with the British High Commission in Kampala and assisted in organizing the evacuation of citizens of ten western nations from Uganda to Kenya. For this, Colonel Frazer was awarded the Meritorious Service Cross. In 1986, Frazer and his wife returned to Canada where he built his home and retired on Salt Spring Island, BC. Joining the Reform Party of Canada in 1988, Frazer was elected Saanich-Gulf Islands' Reform Party of Canada's Candidate for Parliament in 1993 and was elected Member of Parliament for Saanich-Gulf Islands in the October election that year. He served as Defence and Veterans Affairs Critic and Deputy Whip and sat on seven Parliamentary Committees during the 35th Parliament. His Private Members Bill establishing the Canadian Peacekeeping Service Medal (CPSM), was passed into law on 5 April 1997. After serving in the 35th Canadian Parliament, Frazer did not seek a second term in Parliament.

After the 1997 election, when he left politics, Frazer was appointed to the Veterans Review and Appeal Board, operated by the federal government's Veterans Affairs Canada.
