= Briony Penn =

Canadian author and environmental activist

- Born: October 16, 1960 (age 65)
- Occupations: Writer, naturalist and environmental activist
- Website: https://www.brionypenn.com/

Briony Penn (born October 16, 1960, Saanich, British Columbia) is a Canadian author and environmental activist who received international attention when she protested logging on Salt Spring Island by riding horseback through downtown Vancouver while nearly nude and dressed as Lady Godiva. She won the Roderick Haig-Brown Regional Prize and was shortlisted for the Hubert Evans Non-Fiction Prize in 2016 for her book The Real Thing: The Natural History of Ian McTaggart Cowan (Rocky Mountain Books).

== Early life and career ==
A fifth-generation islander, Penn was born and raised in Saanich, British Columbia. She graduated from the international baccalaureate program in Victoria (Norfolk House) in 1977. In 1981, she received her BA in geography/anthropology from the University of British Columbia. She then studied in Scotland, and in 1988 received her Ph.D. in geography from the University of Edinburgh.

Penn is an adjunct professor of environmental studies at the University of Victoria and has lectured in the School of Environmental Studies and Restoration of Natural Systems Program since 1991. She was the Liberal Party of Canada's candidate for Saanich—Gulf Islands in the 40th Canadian federal election, Penn was narrowly defeated by Conservative incumbent Gary Lunn, then decided to leave politics.

== Writing ==
She wrote the book The Real Thing: The Natural History of Ian McTaggart Cowan, which won the 2016 Roderick Haig-Brown Regional Prize and was shortlisted for the 2016 Hubert Evans Non-Fiction Prize.

In 2026, Penn published The Seabird Trials: How a Scientist Took Big Oil to Court and Won (Harbour Publishing), a nonfiction book about seabird biologists during the 1986 Apex Houston oil spill.

== Environmental work ==
Penn co-founded The Land Conservancy of British Columbia in 1997 and serves on the board. In January 2001, Penn received international attention for her nearly-nude horseback ride as Lady Godiva to protest against logging on Saltspring Island.

== Political career ==
After supporting the Green Party for more than a decade, Penn announced in March 2007 her intention to run as a Liberal candidate for Saanich—Gulf Islands in the 2008 federal election. She was defeated in a close race (43 to 39 percent) by the incumbent Conservative Gary Lunn, who was the Minister of Natural Resources. Conservative Senator Mike Duffy admitted "Lunn only won his riding in 2008 thanks to Conservative campaign guru Doug Finley’s black-ops magic" which involved the Conservative party's database using robocalls to direct NDP voters to vote for their candidate who remained on the ballot but was not running a campaign. She has stated she has retired from politics.

=== Electoral record ===
2008 Canadian federal election: Saanich—Gulf Islands
Party	Candidate	Votes	%	±%	Expenditures
Conservative	Gary Lunn	27,991	43.42	+6.27	$87,160.56
Liberal	Briony Penn	25,366	39.35	+13.27	$81,963.33
Green	Andrew Lewis	6,742	10.46	+0.52	$26,456.05
New Democratic	Julian West	3,667	5.69	–20.86	$16,230.70
Libertarian	Dale P. Leier	246	0.38	–	none listed
Western Block	Patricia O'Brien	195	0.30	+0.02	none listed
Canadian Action	Jeremy Arney	139	0.22	–	$1,913.41
Christian Heritage	Dan Moreau	114	0.18	–	$18.94
Total valid votes/expense limit		64,460	99.72	–	$91,825.23
Total rejected ballots		179	0.28	+0.07	
Turnout		64,639	70.40	–2.84	
Eligible voters		91,822			
Conservative hold		Swing		–3.50	
Julian West was selected as the New Democratic Party candidate for the 2008 election, but withdrew after the filing deadline following a scandal. Due to the late withdrawal his name remained on the ballot.
Source: Elections Canada

== Personal life ==
Penn currently lives on Salt Spring Island, BC, where she designed her dream home using materials sourced within 100 miles. She has raised two sons, Ronan and Callum, with her ex husband Donald Gunn.
