= Holy Trinity High School (Bradford) =

Holy Trinity Catholic High School

Location
- 100 Melbourne Drive; Bradford West Gwillimbury, Ontario, L3Z 2B3; Canada
- Coordinates: 44.1073°N 79.5795°W

Information
- Type: Secondary school
- Motto: We Grow Through Love and Example
- Religious affiliation: Catholic
- Established: 1985
- School board: Simcoe Muskoka Catholic District School Board
- Principal: Michael Borgia
- Grades: 9-12
- Enrollment: 1,044 (May 2024)
- Colours: Yellow and black
- Mascot: Twister The Tiger
- Team name: Trinity Tigers
- Website: smcdsb.on.ca/htr/

Holy Trinity Catholic High School is a Catholic secondary school in Bradford West Gwillimbury, Ontario, Canada. It is one of the two high schools located in Bradford West Gwillimbury, the other being Bradford District High School. It was established in 1985.

== History ==
In May 2023, the province announces $6.8M to expand Holy Trinity Catholic Highs School. This was a response to the Town's significant growth over the years. The new addition is expected to accommodate another 276 students in on top of about 1,044 attending Holy Trinity Catholic High School (May 2024). The construction is currently set to finish in 2026.

== Notable alumni ==
- Gregory Guevara (class of 2015), YouTuber and political satirist, candidate in the 2022 Ottawa mayoral election

== See also ==
- Education in Ontario
- List of secondary schools in Ontario
