= J. J. McCullough =

Canadian YouTuber (born 1984)

J.J. McCullough
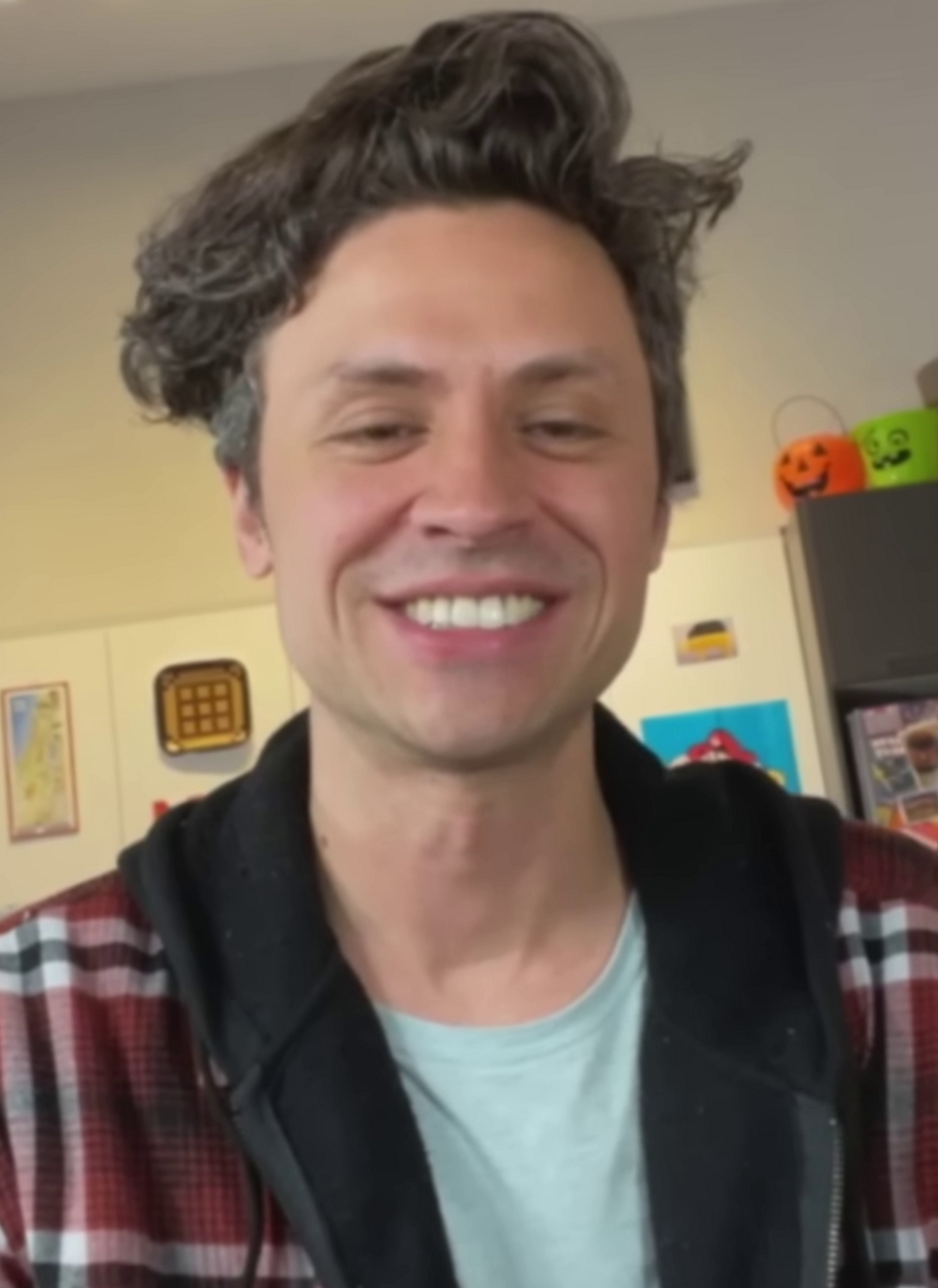
- McCullough in 2022
- Born: John James Stephen "J.J." McCullough; July 17, 1984 (age 42); Vancouver, British Columbia, Canada
- Education: Simon Fraser University
- Occupations: YouTuber; columnist; writer

YouTube information
- Channel: @JJMcCullough
- Years active: 2006–present
- Genres: Politics; history; education
- Subscribers: 997 thousand
- Views: 391 million
- J. J. McCullough's voice On how he became interested in political cartooning Recorded May 2022
- Last updated: October 10, 2026

John James Stephen "J.J." McCullough (born July 17, 1984) is a Canadian YouTuber, cartoonist, columnist, and writer. He is known for his political and social commentary videos on YouTube. After graduating from Simon Fraser University, McCullough began editing for the campus newspaper The Peak and worked as editor-in-chief at the Douglas College student newspaper The Other Press. McCullough has also written for The Washington Post and the National Review.

McCullough has been described as a conservative. McCullough has long been an advocate for the abolition of Canada's constitutional monarchy and has a positive view of the United States. He opposes the Online Streaming Act.

== Early life and education ==
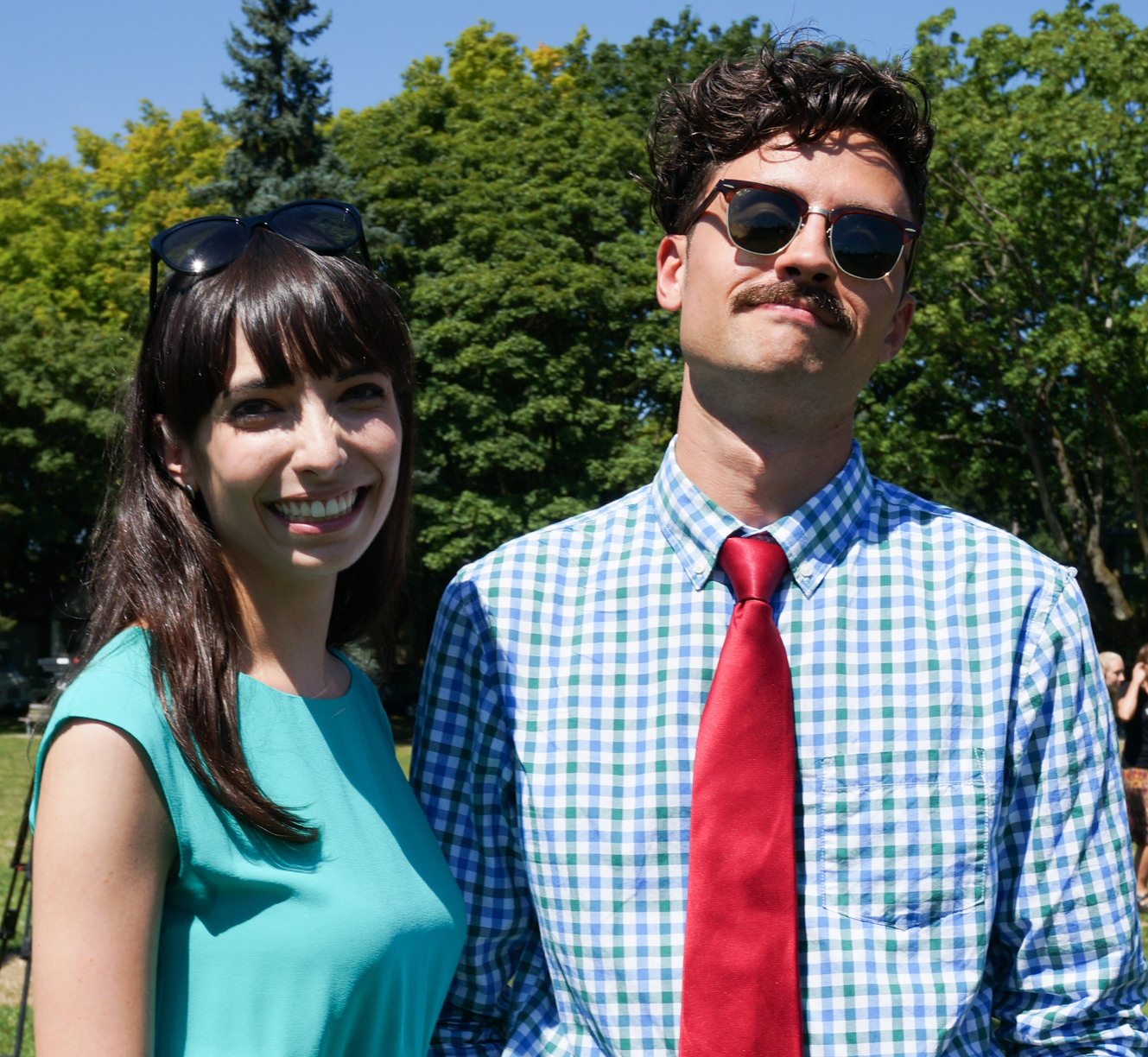
McCullough (right) with Canadian cannabis rights activist Jodie Emery in 2014

McCullough was born on July 17, 1984; he grew up in Vancouver, British Columbia. He identifies as a middle-class conservative. McCullough graduated from Simon Fraser University where he had been opinion editor for campus paper The Peak and an editor-in-chief at Douglas College student newspaper The Other Press.

While attending SFU, McCullough, acting as CEO for the Independent Electoral Commission appointed by the Simon Fraser Student Society, oversaw a successful 2008 referendum whereby 67% of SFU students voted to leave the Canadian Federation of Students. The CFS contested the referendum's legitimacy, but ultimately settled out of court and Simon Fraser University's student union officially left in 2012.

McCullough is a hobbyist collector and has collected items from countries such as Mexico, Russia, South Korea and Sweden, and stated in a 2024 interview, that one of his goals is to "have a trinket or bauble of some significance from every place in the world."

== Journalism career ==
McCullough began commentating professionally at Sun News Network, until its abrupt closure in 2015. He also provided on-air political commentary for CTV. After Sun News closed, McCullough purchased a camcorder from Best Buy and began recording videos in his home. In 2017, McCullough created The Canada Guide website.

In February 2017, the Parliament of Quebec voted to condemn an opinion piece written by McCullough in The Washington Post, which they say insulted the province. McCullough later described the motion as "preposterous and absurd." In 2017, Vice News published a rebuttal to McCullough's opinion article in The Washington Post saying "JJ McCullough genuinely misunderstands the Canadian political system. This leaves him unable to articulate his complaints about it in a meaningful way, and instead he relies on his obvious fetishism of the American presidential system, with its tripartite separation of powers, to fill in the gaps of both his knowledge and political imagination."

McCullough worked for The Washington Post as an international opinion contributor until February 2023. He was considered to be a key voice to comment on drug-related deaths by the Washington Post. McCullough was a columnist for the National Review. McCullough was on True North Centre for Public Policy where he discussed Trump's latest statements on trade.

== YouTube career ==
McCullough is most known for his YouTube channel, which has nearly 1 million subscribers. He started the channel in 2016. He produces videos on a range of subjects, including both Canadian and global politics, as well as history and culture. His videos are known for the eccentric backgrounds and his seat on a yoga ball. McCullough's audience is approximately 80% male with the majority of viewers aged between 20 and 35 and about half of them being located in the U.S.

In a survey conducted by the Reuters Institute for the Study of Journalism published in October 2025, he was ranked as the 14th "most mentioned individual" in terms of news on social and video networks in Canada.

== Views ==
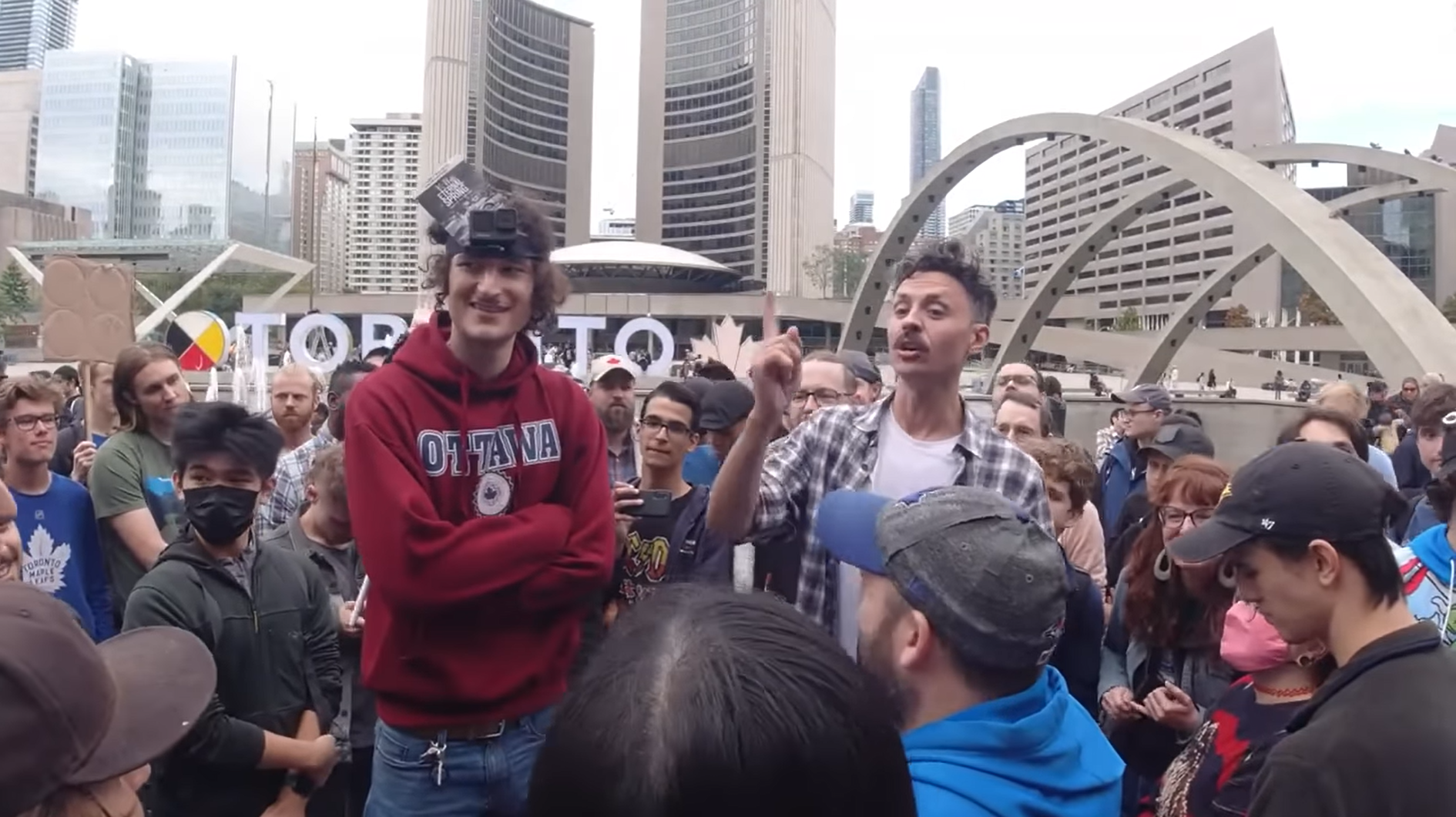
McCullough (middle right) with Canadian YouTuber Gregory Guevara at his 2022 political rally, in Toronto

McCullough has been described as a conservative. He has long been an advocate for the abolition of Canada's constitutional monarchy, and was formerly a spokesperson for Citizens for a Canadian Republic. McCullough is a critic of the Canadian political system and of official bilingualism, calling for the end of an official status for the French language at the federal level. McCullough believes that the French language should not have any official recognition in Canada, arguing that it gives the Laurentian elite an unfair and disproportionate power.

McCullough has a positive view of the United States and has called Americans who said they wanted to move to Canada after an election loss "sore losers" stating that "[it's] very disrespectful of a great gift that they've been given in life, which is to be born in the United States." McCullough has accused media coverage of refugees in Canada to have "misinformation" and claims when "speaking on a highly sensitive and complex issue was far more reckless, repeating myths that have a tangible impact on how refugees are treated in Canadian society." Despite his generally positive outlook towards the United States, McCullough has at times shown his disdain for the contemporary Republican Party, Donald Trump, members of his administration, and the MAGA movement in his videos, calling them "despicable" alongside other names like "un-American," "traitorous," and more on a livestream prior to the 2024 election. He has nonetheless stated that his channel is "not a political channel," and does not frequently discuss his political opinions in his content.

McCullough has called for conservatives to compromise on transgender related issues, for which he was rebuked by National Review in 2018. In response to criticism, McCullough told the CBC "I'm a contrary guy [...] I've got controversial beliefs on a whole host of issues. But at the end of the day I'm also just a guy. I'm also just a person."

In June 2022, McCullough testified before Canada's Heritage Committee in opposition of Bill C-11. After the bill was enacted, McCullough criticised the decision.

== Personal life ==
J.J. McCullough does not drink alcohol or caffeine. He has stated that refraining from consuming those items motivated him to go further and transition to vegetarianism. McCullough is gay.
