= Lynn Hunter =

Canadian politician

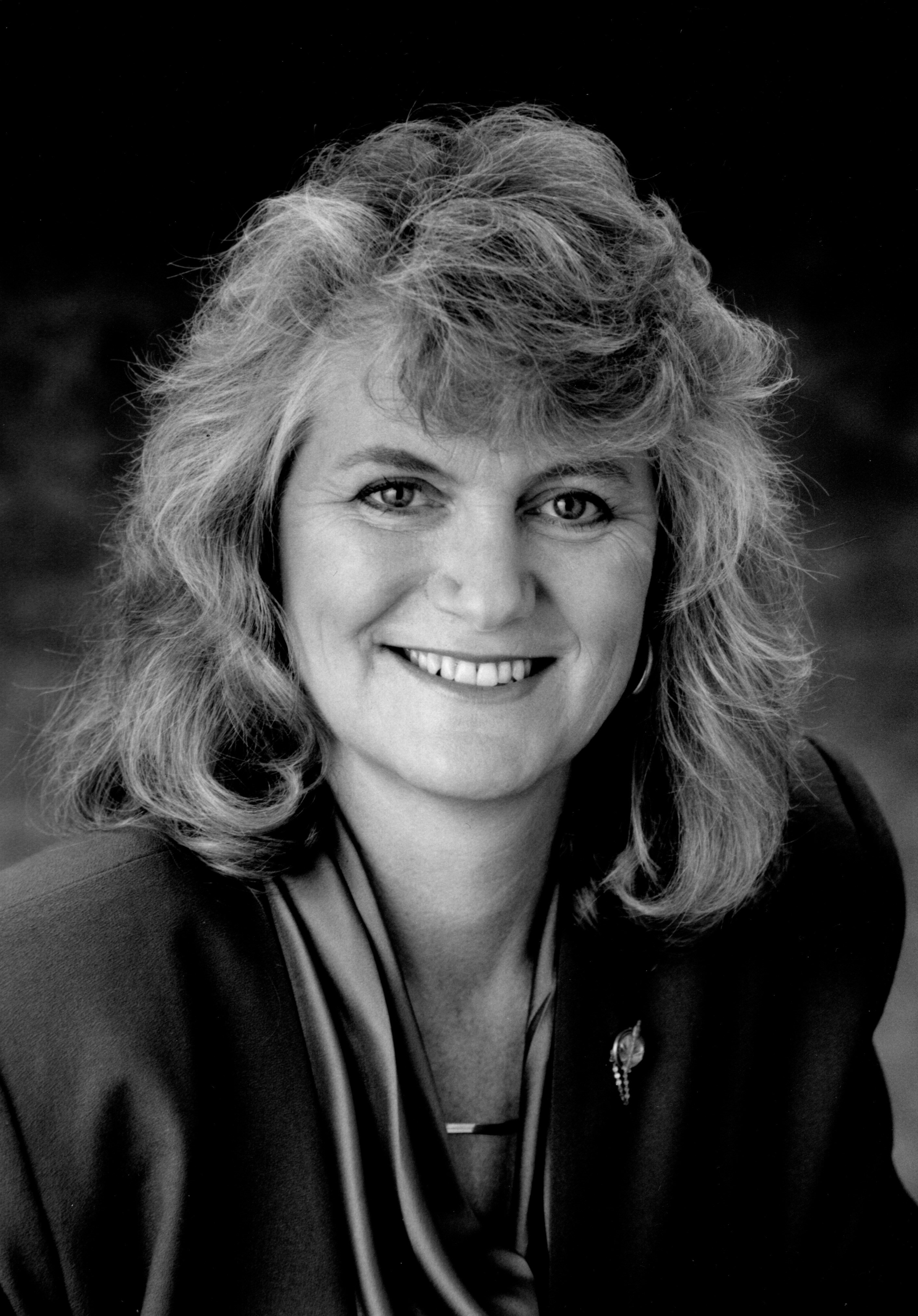

Member of Parliament for Saanich—Gulf Islands
- In office 1988–1993
- Preceded by: Riding established
- Succeeded by: Jack Frazer

Personal details
- Born: 20 January 1947 (age 79) Comox, British Columbia, Canada
- Party: New Democratic Party

Lynn Hunter (born 20 January 1947 in Comox, British Columbia) was a member of the House of Commons of Canada from 1988 to 1993. Her background prior to election included graduating with distinction in Political Science and History from the University of Victoria in 1985. She then went on to become the Vancouver Island Coordinator for OXFAM Canada, work which included a fact finding trip to Sudan and Eritrea in 1986 to assess the effects of the war and famine in that region.

Hunter became a New Democratic Party member of Parliament after winning the Saanich—Gulf Islands electoral district in the 1988 federal election. She served on a number of Parliamentary Committees in the 34th Canadian Parliament including the Environment Committee, two separate committees on the Canadian Constitution and was a frequent contributor to the External Affairs Committee but lost to Jack Frazer of the Reform Party in the 1993 federal election.

From 1994 to 2006, she worked as an aquaculture specialist for the David Suzuki Foundation, the Coastal Alliance for Aquaculture Reform (CAAR) and the Pure Salmon Campaign to safeguard wild salmon and to establish sustainable salmon farming.

In 2008, she was elected to Victoria City Council, a post she held until her defeat in the 2011 election. Hunter endorsed Alberta MP Heather McPherson in the 2026 New Democratic Party leadership election.

She has volunteered extensively with the Multiple Sclerosis Society of Canada. Her daughter was diagnosed with the disease in March, 1999. She was the Chair of the South Vancouver Island Chapter of the MS Society and the also Chair of the BC-Yukon Division and was also chair of the National Government Relations Committee and a member of the National Governance Committee until 2009 when her council duties prevented her from continuing. In 2013 she rejoined both the local Chapter of the MS Society and also now sits as a member at large on the BC Yukon Division Board.

She also serves on the board of RAVEN Trust, a non-profit organization which raises funds in support of First Nations litigation against federal and provincial governments and industry who violate the traditional territories of First Nations.

She is a practising Unitarian and sits on the board of the First Unitarian Church of Victoria.

She lives in the James Bay neighbourhood of Victoria with her partner, Dr. Don Armstrong.
