= Gary Lunn =

Canadian politician (born 1957)

The Honourable Gary Lunn PC
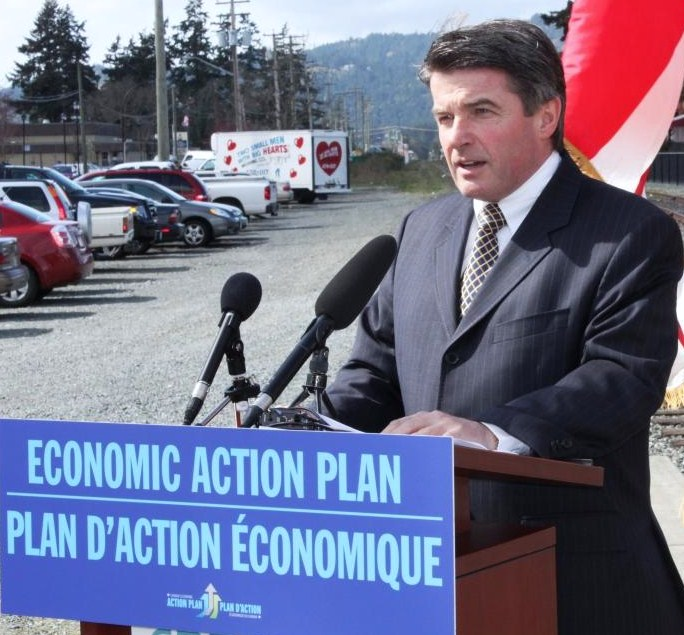
- Lunn in 2010

Minister of State (Sport)
- In office October 30, 2008 – May 18, 2011
- Prime Minister: Stephen Harper
- Preceded by: Helena Guergis
- Succeeded by: Bal Gosal

Minister of Natural Resources
- In office January 6, 2006 – October 29, 2008
- Prime Minister: Stephen Harper
- Preceded by: John Efford
- Succeeded by: Lisa Raitt

Member of Parliament for Saanich—Gulf Islands
- In office June 2, 1997 – May 2, 2011
- Preceded by: Jack Frazer
- Succeeded by: Elizabeth May

Personal details
- Born: Gary Vincent Lunn; May 8, 1957 (age 69) Trail, British Columbia, Canada
- Party: Conservative (since 2003)
- Other political affiliations: Canadian Alliance (2000–2003); Reform (1997–2000)
- Spouse: Alexandra Lunn
- Children: Christopher Lunn; David Lunn; Victoria Lunn
- Profession: Lawyer
- Portfolio: Minister of State (Sport); Minister of Natural Resources

Gary Vincent Lunn PC (born May 8, 1957) is a retired Canadian member of Parliament for the British Columbia riding of Saanich—Gulf Islands. He served in the House of Commons from 1997 to 2011, first as a member of the Reform Party of Canada and subsequently as a member of the Canadian Alliance and the Conservative Party of Canada. He was a Cabinet Minister under Prime Minister Stephen Harper and Official Opposition Critic for Métis and Non-Status Indians, Minister of State for Northern Development, and Critic of the Secretary of State for Human Resources Development. Lunn lost his seat in the 2011 federal election in Canada in an upset to the Leader of the Green Party, Elizabeth May.

== Personal life ==
He is a member of the Conservative Party of Canada as well as the Knights of Columbus. He attended the University of Victoria, where he completed a Bachelor of Law. He practised law in Victoria for two years before seeking the federal nomination for Saanich—Gulf Islands. He and his family reside in Sidney, British Columbia.

== Political career ==
He was first elected to Parliament in the federal election of 1997 as a member of the Reform Party of Canada and was re-elected in 2000 as a member of the Canadian Alliance. In April 2001, Lunn was one of the first Alliance MPs to openly criticize the leadership of Stockwell Day, and was suspended from caucus in May of the same year as a result. He briefly sat with the Democratic Representative Caucus under the leadership of Chuck Strahl, but in November 2001, he left to rejoin the Alliance after Day agreed to hold a leadership race. He was permitted to return to the party in January 2002, during the leadership of John Reynolds, following Day's resignation. In the federal election of 2006, he won re-election against Liberal candidate Sheila Orr and NDP candidate Jennifer Burgis.

=== Minister of Natural Resources ===
Lunn was Minister of Natural Resources in the Cabinet of Prime Minister Stephen Harper from February 6, 2006 to October 30, 2008, when he became Minister of State (Sport) and Minister responsible for the Vancouver 2010 Olympics.

=== Chalk River reactor shutdown ===
Lunn fired Linda Keen, the head of the Canadian Nuclear Safety Commission, on January 15, 2008. Keen, who was due to appear before a parliamentary committee the next day, had ordered a shutdown of the NRU reactor at Chalk River, Ontario, which is operated by Atomic Energy of Canada Limited, in November 2007 over the AECL's failure to perform safety upgrades.

Appearing before a parliamentary committee January 16, 2008, Lunn refused to cite one example of what Linda Keen had done wrong in her job, only that she had lost the confidence of the government. "These are the kinds of Republican tactics this town has never seen before," Liberal MP David McGuinty (Ottawa South) told the natural resources committee. "The Prime Minister and the people around the Prime Minister will stop at nothing. ... They will fabricate, in my mind, a case to dismiss a senior official, an independent regulator," McGuinty told reporters later. Lunn told the committee: "We do not believe she fulfilled her duties. There was an urgency to this situation, make no mistake ... it would have meant life and death for some patients."

AECL fell under Lunn's management as Minister of Natural Resources. The reactor shutdown caused problems with supply shortage of medical radioisotopes, which are used for testing to determine whether a patient has a disease. Canada produces more than half the world's supply. The House of Commons of Canada passed emergency legislation in mid-December 2007, with unanimous support, to get NRU restarted quickly. There has been no backup reactor for NRU since NRX was decommissioned in 1992, making it very difficult for upgrades and maintenance to be performed on NRU.

== Electoral record ==
1997 Canadian federal election: Saanich—Gulf Islands
Party	Candidate	Votes	%	±%	Expenditures
Reform	Gary Lunn	24,275	43.07	+5.86	$61,075
Liberal	Clark Roberts	17,742	31.48	+5.56	$59,743
New Democratic	Chuck Beyer	8,080	14.33	–4.51	$29,672
Progressive Conservative	Marilyn Loveless	4,243	7.53	–4.03	$23,349
Green	Julia Lerner	1,546	2.74	–	$745
Natural Law	Andy Guest	248	0.44	–0.30	$321
Canadian Action	Valerie Rampone	234	0.42	–	$4,335
Total valid votes		56,368	99.68		
Total rejected ballots		181	0.32	–0.03	
Turnout		56,549	74.26	+1.35	
Eligible voters		76,153			
Reform hold		Swing		+0.23	
Source: Elections Canada

2000 Canadian federal election: Saanich—Gulf Islands
Party	Candidate	Votes	%	±%	Expenditures
Alliance	Gary Lunn	25,392	43.16	+0.09	$61,497
Liberal	Karen Knott	19,002	32.30	+0.82	$63,669
Progressive Conservative	Don Page	6,049	10.28	+2.75	$10,385
New Democratic	Pat O'Neill	4,721	8.02	–6.31	$9,666
Green	Wally Du Temple	3,243	5.51	+2.77	$7,217
Natural Law	Kathleen Lapeyrouse	217	0.37	–0.07	$100
Independent	Dan Moreau	123	0.21	–	none listed
Communist	Charley Stimac	88	0.15	–	$189
Total valid votes		58,835	99.72		
Total rejected ballots		165	0.28	–0.04	
Turnout		59,000	70.60	–3.66	
Eligible voters		83,574			
Alliance hold		Swing		−0.36	
Canadian Alliance change is based on the Reform Party.
Source: Elections Canada

2004 Canadian federal election: Saanich—Gulf Islands
Party	Candidate	Votes	%	±%	Expenditures
Conservative	Gary Lunn	22,050	34.58	–18.86	$79,458.94
Liberal	David Mulroney	17,082	26.79	–5.51	$61,819.18
New Democratic	Jennifer Burgis	13,763	21.58	+13.56	$37,795.68
Green	Andrew Lewis	10,662	16.72	+11.21	$80,673.29
Independent	Mary Moreau	214	0.34	–	$12.00
Total valid votes/expense limit		63,771	99.75	–	$81,843.72
Total rejected ballots		159	0.25	–0.03	
Turnout		63,930	73.97	+3.37	
Eligible voters		86,429			
Conservative hold		Swing		−6.68	
Conservative change is from a combination of Canadian Alliance and Progressive Conservative votes.
Source: Elections Canada

2006 Canadian federal election: Saanich—Gulf Islands
Party	Candidate	Votes	%	±%	Expenditures
Conservative	Gary Lunn	24,416	37.15	+2.57	$74,048.33
New Democratic	Jennifer Burgis	17,445	26.54	+4.96	$50,078.83
Liberal	Sheila Orr	17,144	26.09	–0.70	$78,869.50
Green	Andrew Lewis	6,533	9.94	–6.78	$19,040.57
Western Block	Patricia O'Brien	183	0.28	–	none listed
Total valid votes/expense limit		65,721	99.80	–	$85,502.38
Total rejected ballots		134	0.20	–0.05	
Turnout		65,855	73.24	–0.73	
Eligible voters		89,920			
Conservative hold		Swing		–1.19	
Source: Elections Canada

2008 Canadian federal election: Saanich—Gulf Islands
Party	Candidate	Votes	%	±%	Expenditures
Conservative	Gary Lunn	27,991	43.42	+6.27	$87,160.56
Liberal	Briony Penn	25,366	39.35	+13.27	$81,963.33
Green	Andrew Lewis	6,742	10.46	+0.52	$26,456.05
New Democratic	Julian West	3,667	5.69	–20.86	$16,230.70
Libertarian	Dale P. Leier	246	0.38	–	none listed
Western Block	Patricia O'Brien	195	0.30	+0.02	none listed
Canadian Action	Jeremy Arney	139	0.22	–	$1,913.41
Christian Heritage	Dan Moreau	114	0.18	–	$18.94
Total valid votes/expense limit		64,460	99.72	–	$91,825.23
Total rejected ballots		179	0.28	+0.07	
Turnout		64,639	70.40	–2.84	
Eligible voters		91,822			
Conservative hold		Swing		–3.50	
Julian West was selected as the New Democratic Party candidate for the 2008 election, but withdrew after the filing deadline following a scandal. Due to the late withdrawal his name remained on the ballot.
Source: Elections Canada

2011 Canadian federal election: Saanich—Gulf Islands
Party	Candidate	Votes	%	±%	Expenditures
Green	Elizabeth May	31,890	46.33	+35.87	$87,583.86
Conservative	Gary Lunn	24,544	35.66	–7.76	$88,362.18
New Democratic	Edith Loring-Kuhanga	8,185	11.89	+6.20	$66,065.05
Liberal	Renée Hetherington	4,208	6.11	–33.24	$48,563.16
Total valid votes/expense limit		68,827	99.77	–	$95,460.07
Total rejected ballots		160	0.23	–0.05	
Turnout		68,987	73.88	+3.48	
Eligible voters		93,380			
Green gain from Conservative		Swing		+21.82	
Source: Elections Canada
