= Gregory Guevara =

Canadian YouTuber

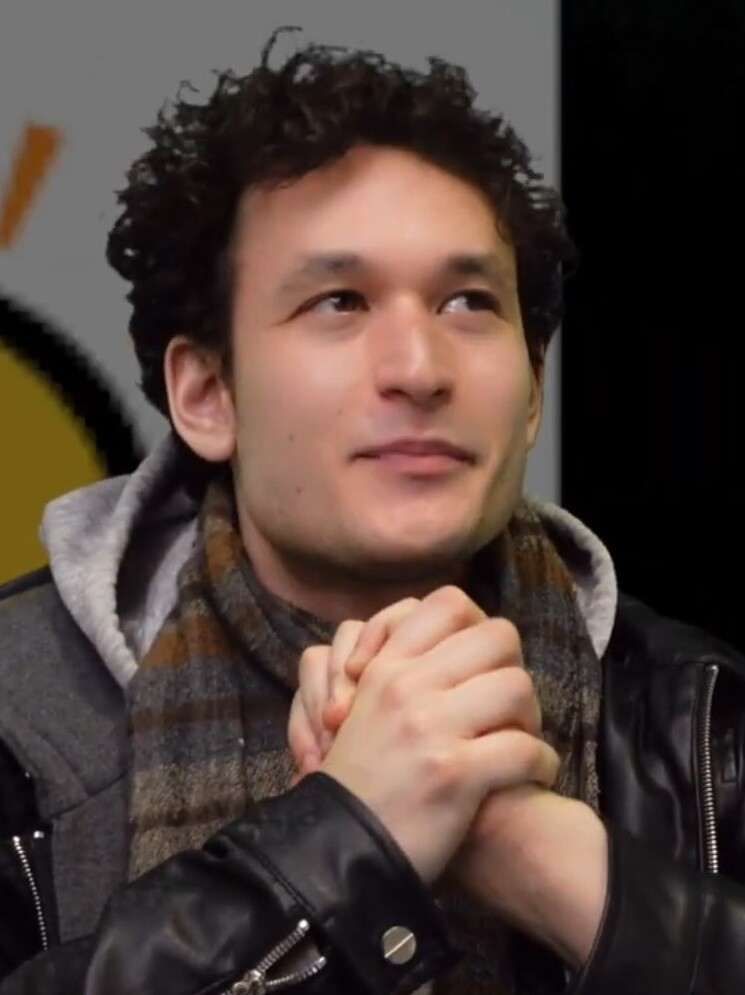
- Guevara in 2023
- Born: Gregory John Guevara; 22 May 1997 (age 29); Ottawa, Ontario, Canada
- Occupations: YouTuber; political satirist; politician

Instagram information
- Page: greg.guevara

X information
- Handle: @mc_swm

YouTube information
- Channel: @Jreg
- Years active: 2009–present
- Genres: Comedy; political commentary; political satire
- Subscribers: 574,000
- Views: 147 million
- Gregory Guevara's voice During a debate with J. J. McCullough as part of his mayoral campaign Recorded October 2022
- Last updated: 24 May 2026

Gregory John Guevara, known online as JREG (/dʒrɛɡ/, also stylized as Jreg, JrEg, or jREG; born 22 May 1997), is a Canadian YouTuber, musical artist, journalist, political satirist, and politician. His web content has been described as millennial and zoomer friendly, and he has covered topics such as the Peterson–Žižek debate, COVID-19, and climate change in parody videos. His channel rose to prominence after a video of his titled Political Compass Rap went viral.

In August 2022, Guevara announced a "post ironic" campaign running for the 2022 Ottawa municipal election, which he claimed to be running in as both a libertarian and a socialist. Guevara was unsuccessful in the election, receiving 584 votes. In 2024, Guevara released his debut album, Postmodern Love Songs. Guevara opposes centrism, having coined the term "Anti-Centrism".

== Early life ==
Gregory John Guevara was born on 22 May 1997 in Ottawa, Ontario. (Note: Horseshoe Theory Podcast (2025-05-03). Interrogating Jreg’s Parents. Retrieved 2025-12-15 – via YouTube.) Along with his three older siblings, he is the son of Caribbean parents. Guevara's father is from Trinidad and Tobago and Guevara's mother is from Jamaica. Guevara grew up in Montreal, playing soccer and hockey as a kid. After graduating from Holy Trinity High School in 2015, (Note: Greg Guevara (2015-06-26). Holy Trinity Catholic High School Valedictorian Speech. Retrieved 2024-06-11 – via YouTube.) Guevara studied journalism at Carleton University. Guevara graduated from Carleton University in 2019 with a Bachelor of Journalism with High Distinction and a Minor in English.

== YouTube career ==
Guevara initially used YouTube to host his songs and spoken word poetry on a channel called MC SWM, an acronym standing for Middle Class Straight White Male.

Guevara started seriously pursuing YouTube after being disillusioned with government work at an unpaid internship that he did as a part of his senior year coursework at Carleton University.

Guevara's videos have been described as "millennial/zoomer-friendly", and he has covered topics such as the Peterson–Žižek debate, COVID-19, and climate change in parody videos. He uses a persona that is "an all-knowing, hyperaware, and slightly-troubled individual whose statements are always drenched in multiple levels of irony." His channel rose to prominence after a video of his titled Political Compass Rap went viral and got 3.9 million views.

His YouTube channel focuses on sketches and music videos, often political in nature, focusing specifically on extreme, obscure, or contradictory political ideologies, such as anarcho-capitalism and anarcho-monarchism. In particular, he is credited with popularizing the once-obscure ideology National Bolshevism on the Internet because of a popular skit in which he "came out" as an "Anarcho-Nazbol". Later, he released a video titled Does irresponsible political satire have consequences? in which he admitted to worrying about how his videos influenced the political views of others, and wondered if joking about niche extremist ideologies helped to create unironic followers of those ideologies.

Guevara also has two other channels: Greg Guevara, where he posts his thoughts on art and community as well as his spoken word and songs; and Jred, where he vlogs about his thoughts on society and his personal struggles.

He runs the Horseshoe Theory podcast with YouTuber Brogan Woodman, better known as Art Chad, where they invite Internet celebrities to discuss radical politics and culture. Guevara and Woodman also founded a community of YouTubers called the Canadian Cybernetic Cultural Research Unit or CCCRU—a name in homage to the CCRU. Guevara stated that he became interested in political vlogging from an Internet meme perspective, and was never into politics for its own sake. He is also known for creating the web series known as Centricide. (Note: "Centricide". YouTube. Retrieved 2026-01-22.)

== Political career ==
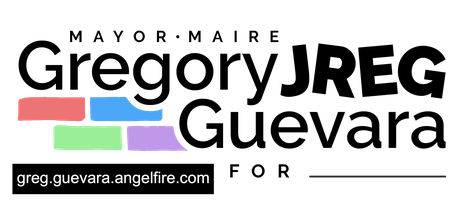
Guevara's 2022 campaign logo

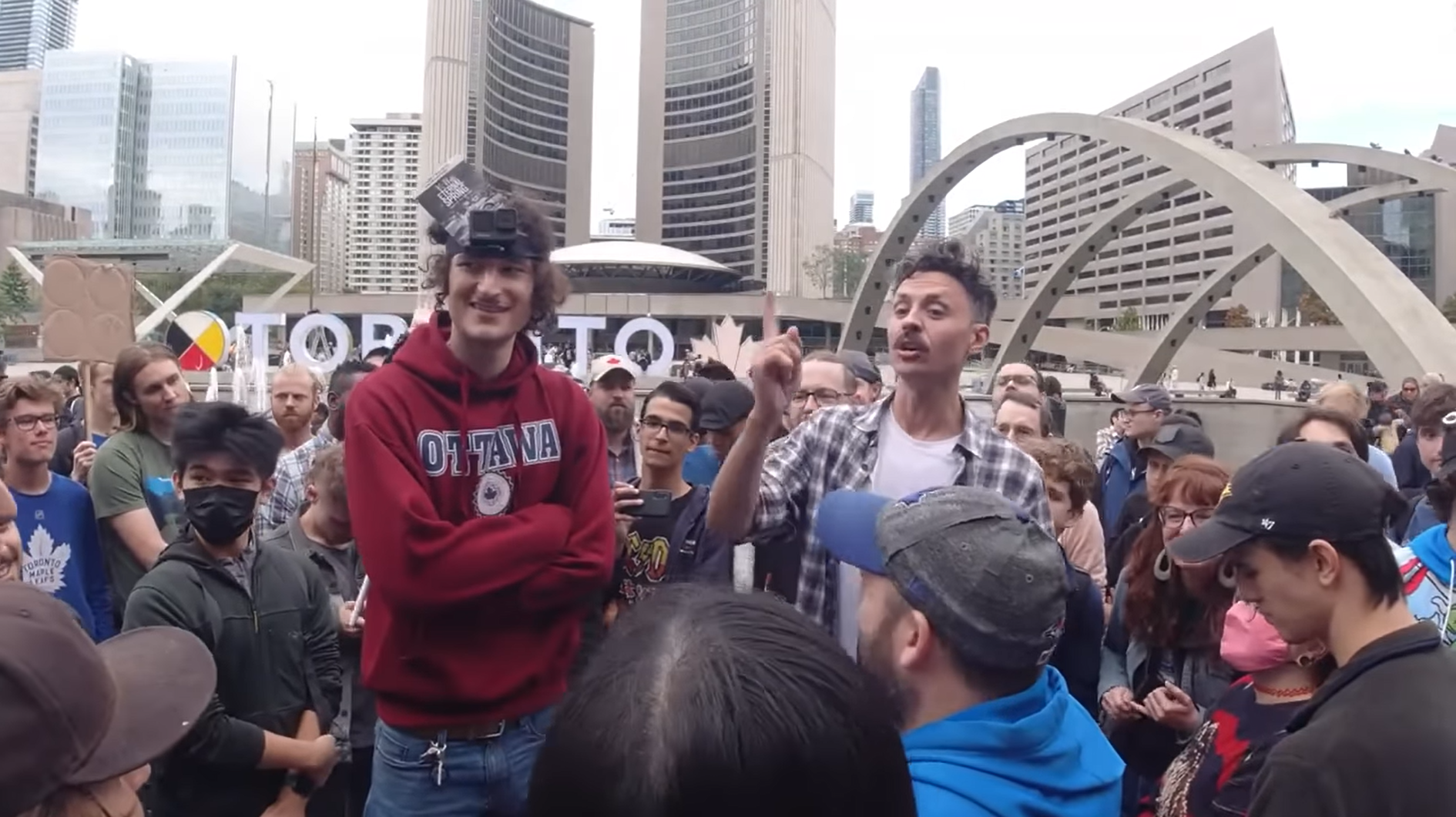
Guevara (middle left) and Canadian YouTuber J. J. McCullough at a political rally, in Toronto

On August 9, 2022, Guevara announced a "post ironic" campaign running for the mayor of Ottawa. He claimed to be running as both a libertarian and a socialist, and aimed to build a wall around Ottawa, the "Ottawall", and nationalize the city through "Ottawexit". The "Ottawall" would prevent non-Ottawans, who Guevara called "Nottawans", from committing crimes in the city. He also promised to make Ottawa bilingual, speaking both Franglais and "government speak." Once these goals were to be completed, Guevara planned to give everybody stay-at-home government jobs with high wages to create a booming economy.

The jobs that he would have prioritized include policy analysts and a "guy who copies Excel spreadsheets back and forth for six hours". According to Guevara, the emphasis on remote government jobs under his leadership would have reduced carbon emissions by reducing the need for transportation. Guevara also planned to address homelessness by deliberately attempting to stop Ottawa's population growth and providing a guaranteed one-bedroom apartment for every individual. He wanted to make all international businesses in the city rebrand to be more "Ottawa-friendly".

He opposed having a police force and supported police abolition, but said that he would have kept a police force for protection from political enemies. On the topic of climate change, Guevara said that it is too late to do anything. Guevara stated that he is "cut from the same cloth" as satirist candidates such as Vermin Supreme and the Neo-Rhinoceros Party, but that they "reach different conclusions." His campaign was run "based on irony and an element of nihilism toward the political system." Guevara lost the election, receiving 584 votes and 0.19% of the popular vote. On Twitter, Guevara would then declare victory and proclaim himself "King of Ottawa". (Note: Guevara, Gregory (2022-10-24). "I have decided to pre-emptively declare victory. I am now King of Ottawa". Twitter. Retrieved 2022-10-24.) He later claimed that the election was "stolen" by "lizard people".

== Music career ==
In the book The Momentous, Uneventful Day by Gideon Haigh, Haigh quotes Guevara's 2020 song Office Life. In the summer of 2024, Guevara released his debut album, Postmodern Love Songs, co-created with musician Liam Schwisberg. The 17-track album delves into topics such as climate change, Internet celebrities, AI, atomization, the black pill and their impacts on relationships.

== Personal life and views ==
Guevara is originally from Ottawa, but later moved to Toronto. In 2022, Guevara stated in a video titled My unironic political ideology, that he is a social democrat. (Note: JREG (2022-01-23). My unironic political ideology. Retrieved 2025-11-03 – via YouTube.) Guevara has stated that he opposes centrism, coining the term "Anti-Centrism". Guevara also opposes "clankers".

== Discography ==
The following songs are available on Guevara's Apple Music and Spotify pages: (Note: Guevara, Gregory. "Apple Music singles by JREG". music.apple.com. Retrieved December 14, 2025.)

Albums
Title	Year
Postmodern Love Songs	2024

Singles and EPs
Title	Year
(Not) a Song About Incels	2019
Maybe He's Just Ape-Political	2019
Pills	2019
Burn the Fence Down	2019
Why Don't You Tell Me a Little Bit About Yourself?	2019
The Centrists Gotta Go	2019
Doughnut Theory	2019
She Doesn't Love You (She Doesn't Even Like You)	2019
This Song Is Not About Anything	2019
I Hear an Orchestra Play	2019
Drugs	2019
Political Compass Rap	2019
Every Extreme Is on the Same Team	2019
Leftist Unity	2019
The World Doesn't Need Another Podcast	2020
I Want to Die in a War	2020
Ancapistan (feat. Take/Five)	2020
All the Same to Me	2020
People Are Just Combinations of Traits	2020
More Than More Than Friends	2020
Office Life	2020
Hi F.B.I (feat. Take/Five)	2020
Print Money	2020
I Just Want to Be Loved (By a 10 out of 10)	2020
High Iq	2020
Agree With Me	2020
Anprim Anthem	2020
If the World Was Ending I Would Go to Mars	2021
I'm a Rapper (I Rap)	2021
Give up on Your Dreams of Owning a Home	2021
Stockholm Syndrome With Being Alive	2021
Life Is Strife	2021
Ottawa!	2021
I Watch My Youtube Videos at 2x Speed	2021
We Tell Our Kids	2021
I Sure Hope I Don't Get Doxxed	2021
I Know You Read My Message	2022
How to Get Everyone to Like You (feat. Yotam Perel)	2022
Feel Bad About Yourself	2022
I'm Gonna Snap!	2022
Stimulus Feed	2023
Atomized	2023
It's Over	2024
It's Unseasonably Warm Again	2024
There's Something Wrong With My Ai Girlfriend's Face	2024
Transhumanism vs Anarcho-Primitivism: The Rap Battle (feat. Jreg)	2024
Political Compass Rap 2 (feat. Jreg)	2024
Kijong Dong	2024
Deep Personal Lies	2024
I Came out Wrong!	2025
Total Clanker Death	2025
Everything I See on My Phone Makes Me Sad	2025
Lessons Into Legacy	2025

== Electoral Record ==
2022 Ottawa municipal election: Mayor
Candidate	Popular vote			Expenditures
Candidate	Votes	%	±%	Expenditures
Mark Sutcliffe	161,679	51.37	–	$537,834.79
Catherine McKenney	119,241	37.88	–	$542,847.97
Bob Chiarelli	15,998	5.08	–	$96,844.84
Nour Kadri	7,496	2.38	–	$71,062.45
Mike Maguire	2,775	0.88	–	$5,500.00
Graham MacDonald	1,629	0.52	–	$5,334.50
Brandon Bay	1,512	0.48	–	$9,478.02
Param Singh	1,176	0.37	–	$13,650.40
Celine Debassige	867	0.28	–	none listed
Ade Olumide	636	0.20	–	$1,966.25
Gregory Jreg Guevara	584	0.19	–	$2,349.61
Bernard Couchman	471	0.15	-0.21	none listed
Jacob Solomon	432	0.14	–	none listed
Zed Chebib	264	0.08	–	none listed
Total valid votes	314,760	99.53		
Total rejected, unmarked and declined votes	1,500	0.47	-0.92	
Turnout	316,260	43.79	+1.24	
Eligible voters	722,227			
Note: Candidate campaign colours are based on the prominent colour used in campaign items (signs, literature, etc.) and are used as a visual differentiation between candidates.
Sources: City of Ottawa

== See also ==
- BreadTube
- Poe's law
- Political compass
- CCRU
