= Saanich—Gulf Islands =

Federal electoral district in British Columbia, Canada

Coordinates: 48.695°N 123.403°W

British Columbia electoral district
- Interactive map of riding boundaries from the 2025 federal election

Federal electoral district
- Legislature: House of Commons
MP
Elizabeth May
Green
- District created: 1987
- First contested: 1988
- Last contested: 2025
- District webpage: profile, map

Demographics
- Population (2011): 104,285
- Electors (2021): 93,538
- Area (km²): 518
- Pop. density (per km²): 201.3
- Census division: Capital
- Census subdivision(s): Saanich (part), Central Saanich, Sidney, North Saanich, East Saanich, South Saanich, Cole Bay, Union Bay, Galiano Island

Saanich—Gulf Islands is a federal electoral district in British Columbia, Canada, that has been represented in the House of Commons of Canada since 1988. It is named for its geographical location across the Gulf Islands and Saanich Peninsula in the Vancouver Island region.

== Demographics ==
Panethnic groups in Saanich—Gulf Islands (2011−2021)
Panethnic group	2021		2016		2011	
Panethnic group	Pop.	%	Pop.	%	Pop.	%
European (Note: Statistic includes all persons that did not make up part of a visible minority or an indigenous identity.)	88,690	79.64%	85,125	80.99%	85,695	83.94%
East Asian (Note: Statistic includes total responses of "Chinese", "Korean", and "Japanese" under visible minority section on census.)	8,705	7.82%	8,175	7.78%	6,740	6.6%
Indigenous	4,825	4.33%	4,675	4.45%	3,885	3.81%
South Asian	3,820	3.43%	3,285	3.13%	2,350	2.3%
Southeast Asian (Note: Statistic includes total responses of "Filipino" and "Southeast Asian" under visible minority section on census.)	2,345	2.11%	1,655	1.57%	1,330	1.3%
African	860	0.77%	705	0.67%	640	0.63%
Latin American	785	0.7%	530	0.5%	490	0.48%
Middle Eastern (Note: Statistic includes total responses of "West Asian" and "Arab" under visible minority section on census.)	670	0.6%	440	0.42%	530	0.52%
Other (Note: Statistic includes total responses of "Visible minority, n.i.e." and "Multiple visible minorities" under visible minority section on census.)	660	0.59%	530	0.5%	440	0.43%
Total responses	111,360	98.08%	105,110	97.92%	102,085	97.89%
Total population	113,541	100%	107,339	100%	104,285	100%
Notes: Totals greater than 100% due to multiple origin responses. Demographics based on 2012 Canadian federal electoral redistribution riding boundaries.

More than 21 percent of Saanich—Gulf Islands' residents are immigrants, and more than 31 percent are older than 65, making this the riding with the third largest senior population in Canada. The riding has a median age of 52.4, making it the riding with the highest median age in Canada. The average family income is $119,500; unemployment is 6.4 percent.

According to the 2021 Canadian census; 2013 representation

Languages: 82.3% English, 2.6% Mandarin, 1.8% Yue, 1.2% French, 1.2% German, 1.2% Punjabi
Religions (2021): 35.6% Christian (10.3% Catholic, 6.6% Anglican, 4.6% United Church, 1.3% Baptist, 1.1% Lutheran, 1.0% Presbyterian), 1.7% Sikh, 1.0% Buddhist, 58.3% No religion
Median income (2020): $44,400
Average income (2020): $59,550

== Geography ==
The riding of Saanich—Gulf Islands consists of the north part of the Municipality of Saanich, as well as the municipalities of Central Saanich, North Saanich, and Sidney on Vancouver Island. The district also includes a number of the southern Gulf Islands, including Salt Spring Island, the Pender Islands, Galiano Island, Mayne Island and Saturna Island. The district's southeastern border runs along the University of Victoria.

== History ==
The electoral district was created in 1987 from Esquimalt—Saanich and Cowichan—Malahat—The Islands ridings.

The 2012 federal electoral boundaries redistribution concluded that the electoral boundaries of Saanich—Gulf Islands should be adjusted, and a modified electoral district of the same name will be contested in future elections. The redefined Saanich—Gulf Islands loses a small portion of its current territory in the urbanized portion of Saanich to the new district of Esquimalt—Saanich—Sooke. These new boundaries were legally defined in the 2013 representation order, which came into effect upon the call of the 42nd Canadian federal election, which was held October 19, 2015.

== Political geography ==
Despite the usually close vote between the various right-leaning parties, the Canadian Alliance, Reform and Conservative parties consistently won the district from 1993 to 2011. From 1953 to 2011, the riding and its predecessor, Esquimalt—Saanich, were only won by a non-conservative candidate two times: 1968 by Liberal David Anderson, and in 1988 by New Democrat Lynn Hunter. In each election from 2011 onwards, it has been won by former Green party leader Elizabeth May, who in 2015 won every poll-district within the constituency. The 1988 Conservative loss is attributed to vote splitting between the Progressive Conservatives and the new Reform party. Despite a Conservative majority in 2011, the Greens won their very first elected seat here and it went on to become their only stronghold in the country. The peninsular portion of the riding is more competitive, with significant support for all parties except the Liberals. However, the Gulf Islands have probably the strongest Green support in the country, with many voters being environmentally conscious, moderate retirees, as well as a notable artist population. Even with the Green collapse nationally in 2021, May held on with 37%, although it was her lowest voteshare in the riding.

== Riding associations ==
Riding associations are the local branches of political parties:

Party	Association name	President	HQ city
Conservative	Saanich—Gulf Islands Conservative Association	Michael Dickerson	Central Saanich
Green	Saanich—Gulf Islands Green Party Association	Thomas Niemann	Saanich
Liberal	Saanich—Gulf Islands Federal Liberal Association	Sulochana Saravanabawan	Saanich
New Democratic	Saanich—Gulf Islands Federal NDP Riding Association	Elroy Deimert	Sidney

== Members of Parliament ==
This riding has elected the following members of Parliament:

Parliament	Years	Member	Party
Saanich—Gulf Islands; Riding created from Esquimalt—Saanich and Cowichan—Malahat—The Islands
34th	1988–1993	Lynn Hunter	New Democratic
35th	1993–1997	Jack Frazer	Reform
36th	1997–2000	Gary Lunn	Reform
36th	2000–2000	Gary Lunn	Alliance
37th	2000–2003	Gary Lunn	Alliance
37th	2003–2004	Gary Lunn	Conservative
38th	2004–2006	Gary Lunn	Conservative
39th	2006–2008	Gary Lunn	Conservative
40th	2008–2011	Gary Lunn	Conservative
41st	2011–2015	Elizabeth May	Green
42nd	2015–2019	Elizabeth May	Green
43rd	2019–2021	Elizabeth May	Green
44th	2021–2025	Elizabeth May	Green
45th	2025–present	Elizabeth May	Green

=== Current member of Parliament ===
As of 2024, the district's member of Parliament is Green Party leader Elizabeth May. She was first elected in 2011 and was the first Green MP to be elected to the House of Commons. She defeated Conservative incumbent and cabinet minister Gary Lunn.

== Election results ==
Graph of election results in Saanich—Gulf Islands (1988-, minor parties that never got 2% of the vote or didn't run consistently are omitted)

2025 Canadian federal election
Party	Candidate	Votes	%	±%	Expenditures
Green	Elizabeth May	31,199	39.10	+3.33	$141,917.72
Liberal	David Beckham	25,409	31.85	+13.04	$102,877.53
Conservative	Cathie Ounsted	20,015	25.09	+2.44	$142,555.14
New Democratic	Colin Plant	3,163	3.96	–15.59	$46,746.99
Total valid votes/expense limit		79,786	99.58	–	$147,255.57
Total rejected ballots		336	0.42	–0.15	
Turnout		80,122	77.87	+7.99	
Eligible voters		102,890			
Green notional hold		Swing		–4.86	
Source: Elections Canada

2021 federal election redistributed results
Party	Vote	%
Green	25,136	35.77
Conservative	15,915	22.65
New Democratic	13,738	19.55
Liberal	13,216	18.81
People's	2,115	3.01
Others	156	0.22

2021 Canadian federal election
Party	Candidate	Votes	%	±%	Expenditures
Green	Elizabeth May	24,648	37.62	–11.47	$83,311.07
Conservative	David Busch	14,775	22.55	+2.32	$85,537.45
Liberal	Sherri Moore-Arbour	12,056	18.40	+1.78	$46,863.06
New Democratic	Sabina Singh	11,959	18.25	+5.55	$44,510.15
People's	David Hilderman	1,943	2.97	+1.60	none listed
Communist	Dock Currie	141	0.22	–	none listed
Total valid votes/expense limit		65,522	99.43	–	$121,248.58
Total rejected ballots		374	0.57	+0.10	
Turnout		65,896	69.88	–4.74	
Eligible voters		94,293			
Green hold		Swing		–6.90	
Source: Elections Canada

2019 Canadian federal election
Party	Candidate	Votes	%	±%	Expenditures
Green	Elizabeth May	33,454	49.09	–5.31	$88,298.61
Conservative	David Busch	13,784	20.23	+0.77	$105,104.12
Liberal	Ryan Windsor	11,326	16.62	–0.08	$74,433.20
New Democratic	Sabina Singh	8,657	12.70	+3.63	$22,817.36
People's	Ron Broda	929	1.36	–	$4,319.38
Total valid votes/expense limit		68,150	99.53	–	$115,731.00
Total rejected ballots		323	0.47	+0.18	
Turnout		68,473	74.63	–4.05	
Eligible voters		91,752			
Green hold		Swing		–3.04	
Source: Elections Canada

2015 Canadian federal election
Party	Candidate	Votes	%	±%	Expenditures
Green	Elizabeth May	37,070	54.40	+7.99	$191,615.15
Conservative	Robert Boyd	13,260	19.46	–17.02	$148,289.09
Liberal	Tim Kane	11,380	16.70	+10.64	$51,446.10
New Democratic	Alicia Cormier	6,181	9.07	–1.97	$53,257.32
Libertarian	Meghan Jess Porter	249	0.37	–	$231.52
Total valid votes/expense limit		68,140	99.71	–	$223,670.30
Total rejected ballots		201	0.29	+0.06	
Turnout		68,341	78.68	+4.80	
Eligible voters		86,863			
Green hold		Swing		+12.50	
Source: Elections Canada

2011 federal election redistributed results
Party	Vote	%
Green	28,993	46.42
Conservative	22,785	36.48
New Democratic	6,898	11.04
Liberal	3,787	6.06

2011 Canadian federal election
Party	Candidate	Votes	%	±%	Expenditures
Green	Elizabeth May	31,890	46.33	+35.87	$87,583.86
Conservative	Gary Lunn	24,544	35.66	–7.76	$88,362.18
New Democratic	Edith Loring-Kuhanga	8,185	11.89	+6.20	$66,065.05
Liberal	Renée Hetherington	4,208	6.11	–33.24	$48,563.16
Total valid votes/expense limit		68,827	99.77	–	$95,460.07
Total rejected ballots		160	0.23	–0.05	
Turnout		68,987	73.88	+3.48	
Eligible voters		93,380			
Green gain from Conservative		Swing		+21.82	
Source: Elections Canada

2008 Canadian federal election
Party	Candidate	Votes	%	±%	Expenditures
Conservative	Gary Lunn	27,991	43.42	+6.27	$87,160.56
Liberal	Briony Penn	25,366	39.35	+13.27	$81,963.33
Green	Andrew Lewis	6,742	10.46	+0.52	$26,456.05
New Democratic	Julian West	3,667	5.69	–20.86	$16,230.70
Libertarian	Dale P. Leier	246	0.38	–	none listed
Western Block	Patricia O'Brien	195	0.30	+0.02	none listed
Canadian Action	Jeremy Arney	139	0.22	–	$1,913.41
Christian Heritage	Dan Moreau	114	0.18	–	$18.94
Total valid votes/expense limit		64,460	99.72	–	$91,825.23
Total rejected ballots		179	0.28	+0.07	
Turnout		64,639	70.40	–2.84	
Eligible voters		91,822			
Conservative hold		Swing		–3.50	
Julian West was selected as the New Democratic Party candidate for the 2008 election, but withdrew after the filing deadline following a scandal. Due to the late withdrawal his name remained on the ballot.
Source: Elections Canada

2006 Canadian federal election
Party	Candidate	Votes	%	±%	Expenditures
Conservative	Gary Lunn	24,416	37.15	+2.57	$74,048.33
New Democratic	Jennifer Burgis	17,445	26.54	+4.96	$50,078.83
Liberal	Sheila Orr	17,144	26.09	–0.70	$78,869.50
Green	Andrew Lewis	6,533	9.94	–6.78	$19,040.57
Western Block	Patricia O'Brien	183	0.28	–	none listed
Total valid votes/expense limit		65,721	99.80	–	$85,502.38
Total rejected ballots		134	0.20	–0.05	
Turnout		65,855	73.24	–0.73	
Eligible voters		89,920			
Conservative hold		Swing		–1.19	
Source: Elections Canada

2004 Canadian federal election
Party	Candidate	Votes	%	±%	Expenditures
Conservative	Gary Lunn	22,050	34.58	–18.86	$79,458.94
Liberal	David Mulroney	17,082	26.79	–5.51	$61,819.18
New Democratic	Jennifer Burgis	13,763	21.58	+13.56	$37,795.68
Green	Andrew Lewis	10,662	16.72	+11.21	$80,673.29
Independent	Mary Moreau	214	0.34	–	$12.00
Total valid votes/expense limit		63,771	99.75	–	$81,843.72
Total rejected ballots		159	0.25	–0.03	
Turnout		63,930	73.97	+3.37	
Eligible voters		86,429			
Conservative hold		Swing		−6.68	
Conservative change is from a combination of Canadian Alliance and Progressive Conservative votes.
Source: Elections Canada

2000 Canadian federal election
Party	Candidate	Votes	%	±%	Expenditures
Alliance	Gary Lunn	25,392	43.16	+0.09	$61,497
Liberal	Karen Knott	19,002	32.30	+0.82	$63,669
Progressive Conservative	Don Page	6,049	10.28	+2.75	$10,385
New Democratic	Pat O'Neill	4,721	8.02	–6.31	$9,666
Green	Wally Du Temple	3,243	5.51	+2.77	$7,217
Natural Law	Kathleen Lapeyrouse	217	0.37	–0.07	$100
Independent	Dan Moreau	123	0.21	–	none listed
Communist	Charley Stimac	88	0.15	–	$189
Total valid votes		58,835	99.72		
Total rejected ballots		165	0.28	–0.04	
Turnout		59,000	70.60	–3.66	
Eligible voters		83,574			
Alliance hold		Swing		−0.36	
Canadian Alliance change is based on the Reform Party.
Source: Elections Canada

1997 Canadian federal election
Party	Candidate	Votes	%	±%	Expenditures
Reform	Gary Lunn	24,275	43.07	+5.86	$61,075
Liberal	Clark Roberts	17,742	31.48	+5.56	$59,743
New Democratic	Chuck Beyer	8,080	14.33	–4.51	$29,672
Progressive Conservative	Marilyn Loveless	4,243	7.53	–4.03	$23,349
Green	Julia Lerner	1,546	2.74	–	$745
Natural Law	Andy Guest	248	0.44	–0.30	$321
Canadian Action	Valerie Rampone	234	0.42	–	$4,335
Total valid votes		56,368	99.68		
Total rejected ballots		181	0.32	–0.03	
Turnout		56,549	74.26	+1.35	
Eligible voters		76,153			
Reform hold		Swing		+0.23	
Source: Elections Canada

1993 Canadian federal election
Party	Candidate	Votes	%	±%
Reform	Jack Frazer	26,480	37.21	+24.73
Liberal	Alex Phillips	18,442	25.91	+8.29
New Democratic	Lynn Hunter	13,414	18.85	–16.55
Progressive Conservative	Marilyn Loveless	8,222	11.55	–21.91
National	Judith Rayburn	3,817	5.36	–
Natural Law	Andy Guest	524	0.74	–
Independent	C.R. Bob Ward	217	0.30	–
Canada Party	Arleigh Rolind	53	0.07	–
Total valid votes		71,169	99.65	
Total rejected ballots		247	0.35	+0.07
Turnout		71,416	72.91	–11.76
Eligible voters		97,952		
Reform gain from New Democratic		Swing		+20.64
Source: Elections Canada

1988 Canadian federal election
Party	Candidate	Votes	%	±%
New Democratic	Lynn Hunter	23,168	35.40	–
Progressive Conservative	Patrick Crofton	21,900	33.46	–
Liberal	Kathryn Clout	11,534	17.62	–
Reform	Bob Slavick	8,165	12.48	–
Independent	Patrick Kelly	216	0.33	–
Libertarian	William St. John Buckler	214	0.33	–
Independent	Doug Christie	172	0.26	–
Communist	Ernest Leon Knott	78	0.12	–
Total valid votes		65,447	99.73	
Total rejected ballots		180	0.27	–
Turnout		65,627	84.67	–
Eligible voters		77,506		
This riding was created from Esquimalt—Saanich and Cowichan—Malahat—The Islands, which elected a Progressive Conservative and a New Democrat, respectively, in the previous election. Patrick Crofton was the incumbent from Esquimalt—Saanich.
Source: Elections Canada

== See also ==
- List of Canadian electoral districts
- Historical federal electoral districts of Canada
