= David Chernushenko =

Canadian politician (born 1963)

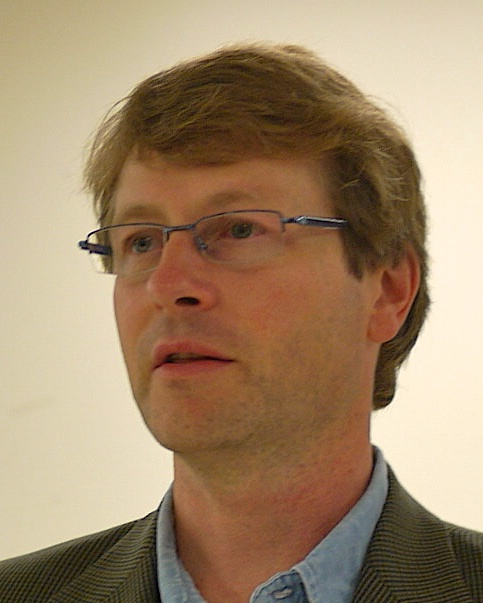

Ottawa City Councillor
- In office December 1, 2010 – December 1, 2018
- Preceded by: Clive Doucet
- Succeeded by: Shawn Menard
- Constituency: Capital Ward

Deputy Leader of the Green Party of Canada
- In office 2006–2008

Personal details
- Born: June 1963 (age 62) Calgary, Alberta
- Political party: Non-aligned; Green Party of Canada (until 2008); Green Party of Ontario

David Chernushenko (born June 1963) is an author, speaker, sustainability consultant, documentary filmmaker and former politician in Ontario, Canada. He was elected to the Ottawa City Council in the 2010 municipal election and re-elected for a second term in 2014. He was the former deputy leader and senior deputy to the leader of the Green Party of Canada, and a leadership contestant for that party.

== Early life and career ==
Born in Calgary, Alberta, and raised in Ottawa, Ontario, Chernushenko is a graduate of Queen's University (political science) and alumnus of Cambridge University (international relations), Chernushenko has worked for the Canadian International Development Agency (CIDA), the Canadian Department of Foreign Affairs and International Trade (DFAIT) and the United Nations Environment Programme. He has served on committees and boards of local housing and environment groups, schools and health advisory bodies.

Chernushenko is a "green building" professional accredited by the Leadership in Energy and Environmental Design (LEED) certification program. As owner of the consulting firm Green & Gold Inc. since 1998, he has advised public, private, and non-profit organizations on adopting more sustainable and socially responsible practices.

From 1998 to 2004, Chernushenko served on the International Olympic Committee's commission on Sport and the Environment. He has written several books on sustainable management practices, including Sustainable Sport Management (UNEP, 2001) and Greening Our Games: Running Sports Events & Facilities that Won't Cost the Earth (Centurion, 1994), and the electronic publication Greening Campuses and their Communities (IISD/ACCC/UNEP, 1996). In 2001, he co-founded Clean Air Champions, a national charity that engaged athletes in raising awareness about air pollution, climate change, and the benefits of physical activity in Canada.

== Federal politics ==
Chernushenko was the Green Party candidate for Ottawa Centre in the 2004 federal election. He finished fourth with 4,730 votes (8%), receiving more votes than any other Green candidate in Ottawa. He ran again in Ottawa Centre in the 2006 federal election and again came fourth, losing to Paul Dewar from the New Democratic Party (NDP). Chernushenko received 6,766 votes (10.2%), the highest vote count of any Green Party candidate in the 2006 election. He passed the 10% threshold, thus becoming eligible for partial government reimbursement of campaign expenditures. Chernushenko was endorsed by the Ottawa Citizen newspaper in the 2004 and 2006 elections. He also ran as the Green Party candidate in Ottawa South in the 2003 Ontario general election.

=== 2006 Green Party leadership bid ===
On March 30, 2006, David Chernushenko announced his bid for the leadership of the Green Party of Canada. He was close to the positions of previous leader Jim Harris, in contrast to Elizabeth May, who was seen as more of a traditional activist. Chernushenko received 33.38% of the votes in the election, losing to May. Since that time, Chernushenko has on occasion been critical of May's leadership of the party, and has publicly spoken out about her mixed messages about strategic voting in the 2008 federal election, an issue that some party insiders blamed for the Greens' poorer-than-expected results in that election.

== National Round Table on the Environment and the Economy ==
On November 10, 2006, Prime Minister Stephen Harper appointed Chernushenko to Canada's National Round Table on the Environment and the Economy (NRTEE), a non-partisan panel that advises the federal government on environmental policy, and works to promote environmental, social and economic practices in Canada's public, private and civil society sectors. Chernushenko served as a member on the NRTEE from 2006 to 2009, and served as vice-chair in 2008–2009.

Chernushenko resigned as deputy leader of the Green Party in July 2007 in order to devote more time to his international consulting business and the NRTEE, and to make documentary films. Since then, he has launched the Living Lightly multimedia project and produced three documentaries, titled Be the Change (2008), Powerful: Energy for Everyone (2010) and Bike City, Great City (2013).

== Ottawa City Council ==
Chernushenko ran as City Councillor for Capital Ward in the 2010 Ottawa municipal election. He won with 41.34% of the vote. He was re-elected in 2014. In the 2018 municipal election, Chernushenko was defeated by Shawn Menard.

== Works ==
Chernushenko, David (2019). Burning Souls. Ottawa: Green & Gold Inc. ISBN 978-1-234-56789-7.

Chernushenko, David; Anna Van der Kamp (2001). Sustainable Sport Management: Running an Environmentally, Socially and Economically Responsible Organization. United Nations Environment Programme. ISBN 92-807-2072-4.

Chernushenko, David (1994). Greening our games : running sports events and facilities that won't cost the Earth. Ottawa: Centurion Publishing & Marketing. ISBN 0-9697571-5-8.

== Electoral record ==
2018 Ottawa City Council election – Capital Ward
Capital Ward (Ward 17)	Vote	%
Shawn Menard	3,575	28.12
Christine McAllister	3,198	25.15
David Chernushenko (X)	2,970	23.36
Anthony Carricato	2,451	19.28
Jide Afolabi	520	4.09

2014 Ottawa City Council election – Capital Ward
Candidate	Votes	%
David Chernushenko (X)	7206	77.53
Scott Blurton	1788	19.19
Espoir Manirambona	322	3.46

2010 Ottawa City Council election – Capital Ward
Candidate	Votes	%
David Chernushenko	5335	41.34
Isabel Metcalfe	2515	19.49
Bob Brocklebank	2207	17.10
Domenic Santaguida	1475	11.43
Eugene Haslam	1084	8.40
Ron Le Blanc	243	1.88
Mano Hadavand	46	0.36

2006 Green Party of Canada leadership election
Candidate	Votes	
Candidate	#	%
Elizabeth May	2,145	65.34
David Chernushenko	1,096	33.38
Jim Fannon	29	0.88
None of the above	13	0.40
Total	3,283	100.0%

2006 Canadian federal election: Ottawa Centre
Party	Candidate	Votes	%	±%
New Democratic	Paul Dewar	24,611	36.93	-4.12
Liberal	Richard Mahoney	19,458	29.20	-1.87
Conservative	Keith Fountain	15,126	22.70	+3.67
Green	David Chernushenko	6,766	10.15	+2.61
Marijuana	John Akpata	386	0.58	-0.14
Independent	Anwar Syed	121	0.18	
Communist	Stuart Ryan	102	0.15	+0.01
Marxist–Leninist	Christian Legeais	68	0.10	-0.02
Total valid votes		66,638	100.00	
New Democratic Party hold		Swing	-1.1	

2004 Canadian federal election: Ottawa Centre
Party	Candidate	Votes	%	Expenditures
New Democratic	Ed Broadbent	25,734	41.05	$75,600.35
Liberal	Richard Mahoney	19,478	31.07	$77,325.72
Conservative	Mike Murphy	11,933	19.03	$37,895.42
Green	David Chernushenko	4,730	7.54	$24,313.40
Marijuana	Michael Foster	455	0.72	–
Independent	Robert Gauthier	121	0.19	–
Communist	Stuart Ryan	90	0.14	$379.63
Canadian Action	Carla Marie Dancey	76	0.12	–
Marxist–Leninist	Louis Lang	67	0.10	–
Total valid votes		62,684	100.00	
Total rejected ballots		270		
Turnout		62,954	70.35	

2003 Ontario general election: Ottawa South
Party	Candidate	Votes	%	±%	Expenditures
Liberal	Dalton McGuinty	24,647	51.70	+2.11	$ 70,963.18
Progressive Conservative	Richard Raymond	16,413	34.43	−7.80	75,453.48
New Democratic	James McLaren	4,306	9.03	+3.23	12,014.97
Green	David Chernushenko	1,741	3.65	+2.07	2,884.13
Family Coalition	John Pacheco	562	1.18		9,388.75
Total valid votes/expense limit		47,669	100.0	+4.11	$ 78,349.44
Total rejected ballots		296	0.62	−0.16	
Turnout		47,965	58.77	+1.03	
Eligible voters		81,614		+2.12	
Liberal hold		Swing		+4.96	
Source(s) "General Election of October 2, 2003 – Summary of Valid Ballots by Candidate". Elections Ontario. "General Election of October 2, 2003 – Statistical Summary". Elections Ontario. "2003 Candidate and Constituency Associations – Candidate Campaign Return (CR-1)".
