= Claude Genest =

Canadian journalist and actor

- Occupation: Teacher

Claude William Genest is a former Canadian journalist, actor, and TV host. He ran as the Green Party of Canada candidate in the riding of Westmount-Ville-Marie during the 2008 federal election.

== Biography ==
A native of Montreal, Quebec, Genest is the son of Canadian actor Émile Genest. He was nominated for the 2006 federal election on January 16, 2006, and ran as a Green Party of Canada candidate in the riding of Jeanne-Le Ber. Genest was one of two deputy leaders of the Green Party of Canada. He was appointed to that position in November 2006, and was succeeded by Jacques Rivard.

In April 2008, Genest became one of the first 250 Canadians to be trained by Al Gore to be an official speaker for the An Inconvenient Truth lecture.

Genest used to teach permaculture at the University of Vermont. Genest is also the founder of the Green Mountain Permaculture Institute where he teaches earth repair and ecological design. He is also creator, producer and host of Regeneration - The Art of Sustainable Living, nominated for an Emmy Award, from their New England Chapter, in 2008.

== See also ==
- Green Party candidates, 2008 Canadian federal election
- Green Party candidates, 2006 Canadian federal election
