= Jacques Rivard =

Jacques Rivard is a Canadian environmentalist and former male deputy leader of the Green Party of Canada. In July 2010, he left the Green party and resigned as deputy leader after serving only seven months and defected to the Bloc Québécois. Rivard is originally from Rivière-du-Loup, and received his formal education in La Pocatière, Quebec.

== Politics ==
On November 24, 2009, Green Party leader Elizabeth May announced she had chosen Rivard, a former journalist at Télévision de Radio-Canada, as her new deputy leader. Rivard served alongside Adriane Carr, the other deputy leader of the federal Greens. However, in July 2010, he resigned as deputy leader and defected to the Bloc Québécois.
