= Andrew Gill =

Andrew Gill may refer to:

- Andrew Gill (diver), British diver
- Andrew Gill (coach) (c. 1887–1947), head football and basketball coach at the University of Kentucky
- Andrew Gill, Canadian Liberal Party candidate for Ontario

== See also ==
- Andy Gill (1956–2020), founding member and guitarist for the English rock group Gang of Four
