= Independent candidates in the 2011 Canadian federal election =

This is a list of the 54 candidates running independently, or without affiliation, in the 41st Canadian federal election.

== Alberta ==
| Riding | Candidate's Name | Notes | Gender | Residence | Occupation | Votes | % | Rank |
|---|---|---|---|---|---|---|---|---|
| Calgary Southeast | Antoni Grochowski | | | | | 225 | 0.36 | 5th |
| Calgary Southwest | Larry R. Heather | | | | | 303 | 0.53 | 5th |
| Crowfoot | John C. Turner | | | | | 463 | 0.88 | 5th |
| Edmonton—Sherwood Park | James Ford | | | | | 16,263 | 29.51 | 2nd |
| Edmonton—Strathcona | Kyle Murphy | | | | | 206 | 0.43 | 5th |
| Edmonton—Strathcona | Christopher White | | | | | 87 | 0.18 | 7th |
| Peace River | Russ Toews | | | | | 359 | 0.75 | 5th |

== British Columbia ==
| Riding | Candidate's Name | Notes | Gender | Residence | Occupation | Votes | % | Rank |
|---|---|---|---|---|---|---|---|---|
| Cariboo—Prince George | Jon Ronan | | | | | 394 | 0.91 | 6th |
| Delta—Richmond East | John Shavluk | Ran as not affiliated because his party, the "Common Sense Party" was not registered with Elections Canada | | | | 220 | 0.46 | 5th |
| Esquimalt—Juan de Fuca | Louis James Lesosky | | | | | 181 | 0.28 | 5th |
| Kootenay—Columbia | Brent Bush | | | | | 636 | 1.49 | 5th |
| Newton—North Delta | Ravi S. Gill | | | | | 123 | 0.22 | 5th |
| North Vancouver | Nick Jones | | | | | 350 | 0.59 | 5th |
| Okanagan—Coquihalla | Sean Upshaw | | | | | 860 | 1.62 | 5th |
| Okanagan—Coquihalla | Dietrich Wittel | | | | | 180 | 0.34 | 6th |
| South Surrey—White Rock—Cloverdale | Kevin Peter Donohoe | | | | | 152 | 0.26 | 9th |
| South Surrey—White Rock—Cloverdale | David Hawkins | | | | | 189 | 0.32 | 8th |
| South Surrey—White Rock—Cloverdale | Aart Looye | | | | | 753 | 1.28 | 5th |
| Surrey North | Jamie Scott | | | | | 451 | 1.22 | 5th |
| Vancouver Island North | Jason Draper | | | | | 304 | 0.52 | 5th |

== Manitoba ==
| Riding | Candidate's Name | Notes | Gender | Residence | Occupation | Votes | % | Rank |
|---|---|---|---|---|---|---|---|---|
| Kildonan—St. Paul | Eduard Hiebert | | | | | 145 | 0.37 | 6th |
| Kildonan—St. Paul | Brett Ryall | | | | | 218 | 0.56 | 5th |
| Winnipeg South Centre | Lyndon B. Froese | | | | | 103 | 0.26 | 6th |
| Winnipeg South Centre | Matt Henderson | | | | | 218 | 0.55 | 5th |

== New Brunswick ==
| Riding | Candidate's Name | Notes | Gender | Residence | Occupation | Votes | % | Rank |
|---|---|---|---|---|---|---|---|---|
| Fredericton | Adam Scott Ness | | | | | 266 | 0.60 | 5th |
| Madawaska—Restigouche | Louis Bérubé | | | | | 1,290 | 3.69 | 4th |
| Saint John | Arthur Watson Jr. | | | | | 294 | 0.79 | 5th |

== Newfoundland and Labrador ==
| Riding | Candidate's Name | Notes | Gender | Residence | Occupation | Votes | % | Rank |
|---|---|---|---|---|---|---|---|---|
| Avalon | Randy Wayne | | | | | 294 | 0.79 | 5th |
| Humber—St. Barbe—Baie Verte | Wayne R. Bennett | | | | | 332 | 1.11 | 4th |

== Ontario ==
| Riding | Candidate's Name | Notes | Gender | Residence | Occupation | Votes | % | Rank |
|---|---|---|---|---|---|---|---|---|
| Brampton West | Theodore Koum Njoh | | M | | Product development entrepreneur, electrical engineering background | 387 | 0.61 | 5th |
| Brant | Leslie Bory | | | | | 174 | 0.30 | 5th |
| Brant | Martin Sitko | | | | | 138 | 0.24 | 6th |
| Hamilton Mountain | Henryk Adamiec | | | | | 171 | 0.32 | 6th |
| Huron—Bruce | Dennis Valenta | | | | | 254 | 0.48 | 5th |
| Kenora | Kelvin Chicago-Boucher | | | | | 147 | 0.60 | 5th |
| Kitchener Centre | Alan Rimmer | | | | | 199 | 0.40 | 5th |
| Kitchener—Waterloo | Richard Walsh-Bowers | | | | | 174 | 0.26 | 6th |
| Lanark—Frontenac—Lennox and Addington | Ralph Lee | | | | | 370 | 0.63 | 5th |
| Mississauga South | Richard Barrett | No affiliation. Candidate for the non registered "Capitalist Party of Canada" | | | | 194 | 0.39 | 5th |
| Ottawa Centre | Romeo Bellai | | | | | 210 | 0.31 | 6th |
| Parry Sound-Muskoka | David Carmichael | | | | | 168 | 0.36 | 5th |
| Peterborough | Gordon Scott | Not affiliated | | | | 189 | 0.32 | 5th |
| Prince Edward—Hastings | Tim Hickey | | | | | 283 | 0.52 | 5th |
| Renfrew—Nipissing—Pembroke | Hec Clouthier | | | | | 9,611 | 18.70 | 2nd |
| Scarborough-Guildwood | Paul Coulbeck | | | | | 259 | 0.68 | 5th |
| Scarborough—Rouge River | Mark Balack | | | | | 357 | 0.77 | 5th |
| Simcoe—Grey | Helena Guergis | Ran as No affiliation, as an Independent Conservative. | | | | 8,714 | 13.54 | 3rd |
| Sudbury | J. David Popescu | | | | | 116 | 0.26 | 6th |
| Toronto Centre | Bahman Yazdanfar | | | | | 108 | 0.19 | 7th |
| Welland | Ray Game | | | | | 169 | 0.33 | 6th |

== Quebec ==
| Riding | Candidate's Name | Notes | Gender | Residence | Occupation | Votes | % | Rank |
|---|---|---|---|---|---|---|---|---|
| Alfred-Pellan | Régent Millette | | | | | 245 | 0.45 | 6th |
| Argenteuil—Papineau—Mirabel | Michel Daniel Guibird | | | | | 342 | 0.59 | 6th |
| Chambly—Borduas | Jean-François Mercier | | | | | 7,843 | 11.33 | 3rd |
| Laurier—Sainte-Marie | Dimitri Mourkes | | | | | 73 | 0.15 | 9th |
| Mount Royal | Abraham Weizfeld | Not affiliated | | | | 74 | 0.19 | 8th |
| Notre-Dame-de-Grâce—Lachine | David Andrew Lovett | | | | | 207 | 0.46 | 6th |
| Papineau | Joseph Young | Not affiliated. Ran as a Communist League candidate, which is not registered. | | | | 95 | 0.22 | 7th |
| Portneuf—Jacques-Cartier | André Arthur | | | | | 14,594 | 27.82 | 2nd |
| Trois-Rivières | Marc-André Fortin | | | | | 346 | 0.69 | 7th |

== Saskatchewan ==
| Riding | Candidate's Name | Notes | Gender | Residence | Occupation | Votes | % | Rank |
|---|---|---|---|---|---|---|---|---|
| Regina—Qu'Appelle | Jeff Breti | | | | | 127 | 0.43 | 5th |
| Saskatoon—Humboldt | Jim Pankiw | | | | | 682 | 1.80 | 5th |

== See also ==
- Results of the Canadian federal election, 2011
- Independent candidates, 2008 Canadian federal election
