= Communist Party of Canada (Marxist–Leninist) candidates in the 2011 Canadian federal election =

This is a list of the candidates running for the Marxist–Leninist Party in the 41st Canadian federal election.

== Alberta - 5 seats ==
Riding	Candidate's Name	Notes	Gender	Residence	Occupation	Votes	%	Rank
Calgary Centre-North	Peggy Askin		F			203	0.40	5/5
Calgary Northeast	Daniel Blanchard		M			206	0.50	5/5
Calgary West	André Vachon		M			227	0.35	5/5
Edmonton Centre	Peggy Morton		F			81	0.16	6/6
Edmonton—Strathcona	Kevan Hunter					91	0.19	6/7

== British Columbia - 13 seats ==
Riding	Candidate's Name	Notes	Gender	Residence	Occupation	Votes	%	Rank
Abbotsford	David MacKay		M			286	0.57	5/5
Burnaby—Douglas	Brian Sproule		M			57	0.12	7/7
Burnaby—New Westminster	Joseph Theriault		M			94	0.21	6/6
Chilliwack—Fraser Canyon	Dorothy-Jean O'Donnell		F			173	0.35	6/6
Nanaimo—Alberni	Barbara Biley		F			81	0.12	6/7
Nanaimo—Cowichan	Jack East					170	0.27	5/5
New Westminster—Coquitlam	Roland Verrier					95	0.19	5/5
Vancouver Centre	Michael Hill					62	0.11	8/8
Vancouver East	Anne Jamieson					318	0.72	5/5
Vancouver Island North	Frank Martin					57	0.10	6/6
Vancouver Kingsway	Donna Petersen					78	0.17	7/7
Vancouver South	Charles Boylan					222	0.49	5/5
West Vancouver—Sunshine Coast—Sea to Sky Country	Carol Lee Chapman					87	0.14	8/9

== Ontario - 29 seats ==
Riding	Candidate's Name	Notes	Gender	Residence	Occupation	Votes	%	Rank
Ancaster—Dundas—Flamborough—Westdale	Jamile Ghaddar		F			77	0.13	6/6
Barrie	Christine Nugent		F			82	0.14	6/7
Beaches—East York	Roger Carter		M			130	0.27	5/5
Bramalea—Gore—Malton	Frank Chilelli		M		High School Teacher	371	0.64	5/5
Burlington	Elaine Baetz		F			140	0.23	5/5
Cambridge	Manuel Couto		M			153	0.28	5/5
Essex	Enver Villamizar					77	0.15	5/5
Etobicoke Centre	Sarah Thompson		F			149	0.28	5/5
Etobicoke—Lakeshore	Janice Murray		F			190	0.35	5/5
Etobicoke North	Anna Di Carlo		F			189	0.59	5/6
Hamilton Centre	Lisa Nussey		F			252	0.60	5/5
Hamilton East—Stoney Creek	Wendell Fields					95	0.20	8/9
Kitchener Centre	Mark Corbiere		M			92	0.18	7/7
Kitchener—Waterloo	Julian Ichim					66	0.10	7/7
Mississauga—Brampton South	Tim Sullivan					127	0.24	5/5
Mississauga East—Cooksville	Piette Chénier					241	0.51	5/5
Mississauga—Erindale	Dagmar Sullivan					99	0.16	5/5
Nickel Belt	Steve Rutchinski					59	0.13	5/5
Oshawa	David Gershuny					61	0.12	6/6
Ottawa Centre	Pierre Soublière					44	0.07	8/8
Ottawa—Vanier	Christian Legeais					122	0.23	5/5
Parkdale—High Park	Lorne Gershuny					86	0.17	7/7
Parry Sound-Muskoka	Albert Gray Smith					54	0.12	6/6
Sault Ste. Marie	Mike Taffarel					38	0.09	6/6
Toronto Centre	Philip Fernandez					76	0.14	8/8
Trinity—Spadina	Nick Lin					140	0.21	6/6
Welland	Ron J. Walker					71	0.14	7/7
Windsor—Tecumseh	Laura Chesnik					242	0.54	5/5
Windsor West	Margaret Villamizar					153	0.38	5/5

== Nova Scotia - 1 seat ==
Riding	Candidate's Name	Notes	Gender	Residence	Occupation	Votes	%	Rank
Halifax	Tony Seed					152	0.33	5/5

== Quebec - 22 seats ==
Riding	Candidate's Name	Notes	Gender	Residence	Occupation	Votes	%	Rank
Argenteuil—Papineau—Mirabel	Christian-Simon Ferlatte					117	0.20	7/7
Beauport—Limoilou	Claude Moreau					122	0.23	7/7
Bourassa	Geneviève Roey					121	0.32	6/6
Brossard—La Prairie	Normand Chouinard	A perennial candidate for the Marxist-Leninist Party.			Truck driver	110	0.18	6/6
Châteauguay—Saint-Constant	Linda Sullivan					162	0.29	6/6
Hochelaga	Christine Dandenault					143	0.31	8/8
Honoré-Mercier	Jean-Paul Bédard					170	0.35	7/7
Jeanne-Le Ber	Eileen Studd					121	0.23	6/6
La Pointe-de-l'Île	Claude Brunelle					213	0.45	6/6
LaSalle—Émard	Yves Le Seigle					288	0.69	6/7
Laurentides—Labelle	Mihaël St-Louis					149	0.26	6/6
Laurier—Sainte-Marie	Serge Lachapelle					77	0.15	8/9
Laval	Yvon Breton					224	0.44	6/6
Laval—Les Îles	Polyvios Tsakanikas					194	0.36	7/7
Longueuil—Pierre-Boucher	Serge Patenaude					228	0.44	6/6
Mount Royal	Diane Johnston					109	0.28	6/7
Notre-Dame-de-Grâce	Rachel Hoffman					131	0.29	7/7
Papineau	Peter Macrisopoulos					228	0.53	6/7
Pontiac	Benoit Legros					124	0.25	6/6
Rosemont—La Petite-Patrie	Stéphane Chénier					140	0.26	7/7
Saint-Laurent—Cartierville	Fernand Deschamps					176	0.43	6/6
Saint-Léonard—Saint-Michel	Garnet Colly					162	0.45	6/6

== See also ==
- Results of the Canadian federal election, 2011
- Communist Party of Canada (Marxist–Leninist) candidates, 2008 Canadian federal election
