= Animal Alliance Environment Voters Party of Canada candidates in the 2011 Canadian federal election =

This is a list of nominated candidates for the Animal Alliance Environment Voters Party of Canada in the 2011 Canadian federal election.

== Ontario - 6 seats ==
Riding	Candidate's Name	Notes	Gender	Residence	Occupation	Votes	%	Rank
Davenport	Simon Luisi	Member of Fair Vote Canada, Davenport candidate for AAEV in 2008.	M	Davenport, Toronto	Self-employed courier	128	0.33	6/6
Guelph	Karen Levenson	Director, Animal Alliance of Canada. Involved in local anti-trapping Guelph by-law, 2009.	F	Guelph	Campaigner with Animal Alliance of Canada (AAC), and a consultant with The Humane Society of the United States (HSUS)	116	0.20	7/8
London North Centre	AnnaMaria Valastro	Co-director of the Peaceful Parks Coalition, former Greenpeace Canada employee, 12 years.	F	London	Native plant and organic gardener	229	0.43	5/5
Newmarket—Aurora	Yvonne Mackie	Ran for Newmarket town council, 2000.	F	Newmarket	Retired teacher	182	0.31	6/6
Thornhill	Liz White	Party leader. Running versus the incumbent Minister of the Environment.	F	Toronto	Director of Animal Alliance of Canada for 18 years.	215	0.36	5/5
Toronto—Danforth	Marie Crawford	Was "a board member of a major animal rights protection organization". Former restaurant won various awards, from Toronto Sun, PETA, NOW.	F	Toronto	Fitness trainer, formerly a restaurateur (1996-2006)	387	0.80	5/5

== Northwest Territories - 1 seat ==
Riding	Candidate's Name	Notes	Gender	Residence	Occupation	Votes	%	Rank
Western Arctic	Bonnie Dawson	Founder of Action for the Protection of Northern Animals (2009), active campaigning since 2007 for animal protection laws.	F	Hay River, Northwest Territories	Civil servant, federal (1972-1984)	87	0.56	5/5
