= Communist Party of Canada candidates in the 2011 Canadian federal election =

This is a list of Communist Party of Canada 2011 federal election candidates by riding and province.

== Alberta ==
Riding	Candidate's Name	Notes	Gender	Residence	Occupation	Votes	%	Rank
Calgary East	Jason Devine	Candidate in this riding in the 2000, 2004, 2006 and 2008 elections	M	Calgary	Student	246	0.71	5/5
Edmonton—Mill Woods—Beaumont	Naomi Rankin	Leader of the Communist Party of Alberta, perennial election candidate since 1982	F	Edmonton	Computer Programmer	100	0.22	6/6

== British Columbia ==
Riding	Candidate's Name	Notes	Gender	Residence	Occupation	Votes	%	Rank
Burnaby—Douglas	George Gidora	Candidate in this riding in 2008 and 2006, candidate in Port Moody–Westwood–Port Coquitlam in 2004 and 2000	M	Coquitlam	Bus Driver	153	0.31	6/7
Newton—North Delta	Samuel Frank Hammond	2008 candidate in St. Catharines and 2006 candidate in Sudbury	M			116	0.25	6/6
Vancouver Kingsway	Kimball Cariou	2008 and 2006 candidate in this riding, candidate in Vancouver Centre in 2004 and 2000, Independent candidate in Vancouver East in 1997	M	Vancouver	Editor	210	0.45	6/7

== Manitoba ==
Riding	Candidate's Name	Notes	Gender	Residence	Occupation	Votes	%	Rank
Winnipeg Centre	Darrell Rankin	Former leader of the Communist Party of Ontario and current leader of the Communist Party of Manitoba, Perennial election candidate	M	Winnipeg	Organizer	152	0.59	5/5
Winnipeg North	Frank Komarniski	Candidate in this riding in 2008 as well as the 2010 by-election	M	Winnipeg	Construction Worker	118	0.46	5/5

== Ontario ==
Riding	Candidate's Name	Notes	Gender	Residence	Occupation	Votes	%	Rank
Brampton—Springdale	Elizabeth Rowley	2008 candidate in Windsor West, 2006 and 2004 candidate in Scarborough Southwest and 2000 candidate in Etobicoke North	F	Toronto	Organizer	219	0.43	5/5
Davenport	Miguel Figueroa	Leader of the Communist Party of Canada, perennial candidate	M	Toronto	Political Organizer	167	0.43	5/6
Don Valley West	Dimitrios "Jim" Kabitsis	2008 candidate in Brampton—Springdale	M	Toronto	Retired	186	0.35	5/5
Guelph	Drew Garvie	2008 candidate in this riding	M	Guelph	Retail Salesman	104	0.18	8/8
Hamilton East—Stoney Creek	Bob Mann	2006 and 2004 candidate in this riding, 2000 and 1997 candidate in Hamilton East (1997 as an independent)	M	Hamilton	Retired	138	0.28	7/9
Kitchener Centre	Martin Suter	2008, 2006, and 2000 Candidate in this riding	M	Kitchener	Truck Driver	93	0.19	6/7
Ottawa Centre	Stuart Ryan	2006 and 2004 candidate in this riding, 2000 candidate in Ottawa West—Nepean	M	Ottawa	Union Representative	109	0.17	7/8
St. Catharines	Saleh Waziruddin		M			91	0.18	6/6
Toronto Centre	Cathy Holliday	2008 Candidate in Don Valley East, 2006 candidate in Etobicoke—Lakeshore	F	Toronto	Nurse	159	0.29	6/8

== Quebec ==
Riding	Candidate's Name	Notes	Gender	Residence	Occupation	Votes	%	Rank
Hochelaga	Marianne Breton Fontaine		F			180	0.39	7/8
Laurier—Sainte-Marie	Sylvain Archambault	Archambault ran as a Communist Party candidate in the 2000 federal election against sitting prime minister Jean Chrétien. He also contested the 1998 and 2003 provincial elections as a candidate of the Communist Party of Quebec. He ran with an endorsement from the Union des forces progressistes in the latter election, appearing on the ballot as an independent candidate as the Communist Party was not officially recognized by the Chief Electoral Officer of Quebec.	M		Retiree	137	0.27	7/9
Outremont	Johan Boyden		M			143	0.37	7/7
Westmount—Ville-Marie	William "Bill" Sloan		M			73	0.18	7/7
