= 2011 Canadian federal election =

- May 2, 2011

308 seats in the House of Commons 155 seats needed for a majority
- Opinion polls
- Turnout: 61.1% (▲2.3 pp)
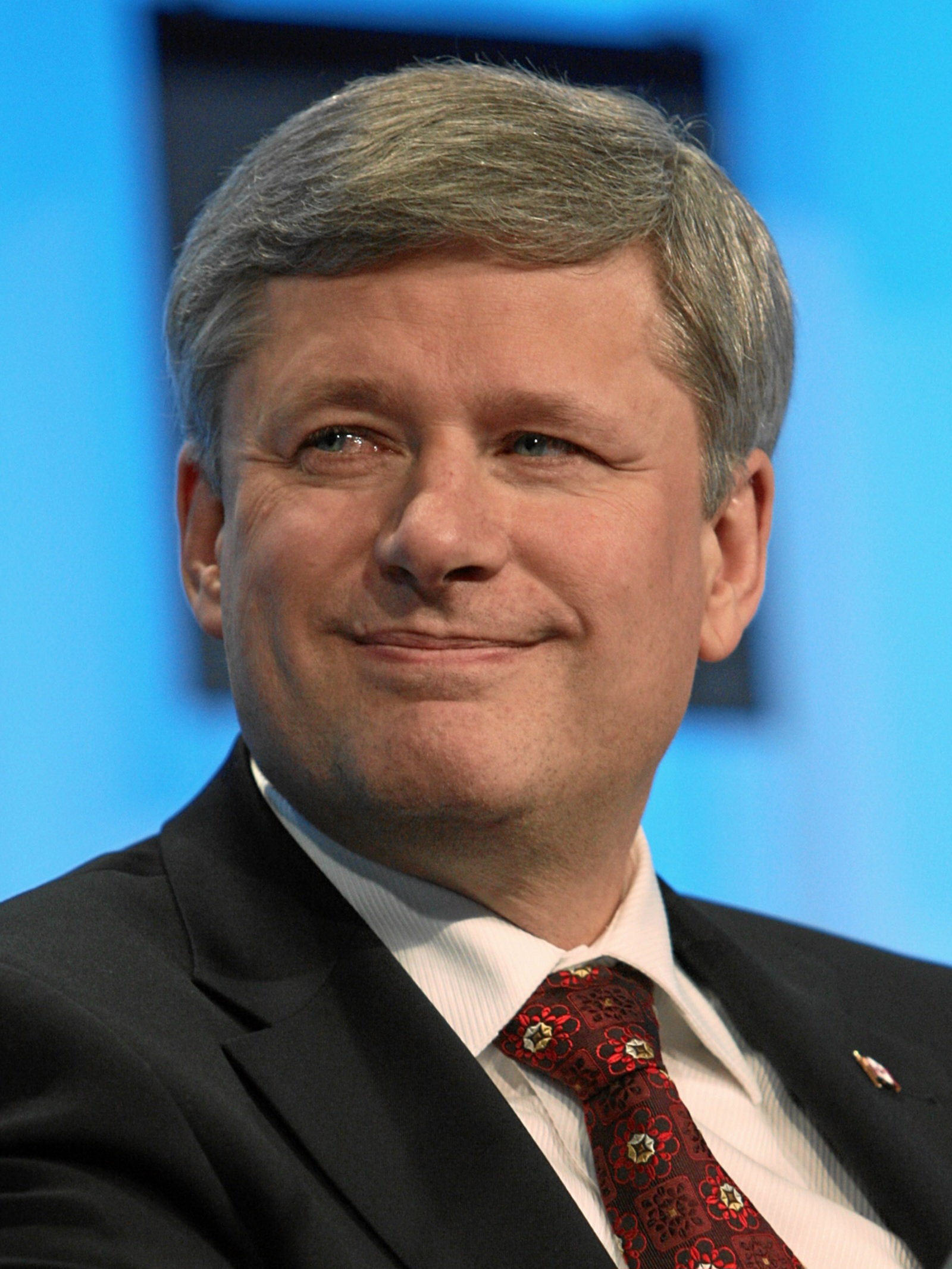

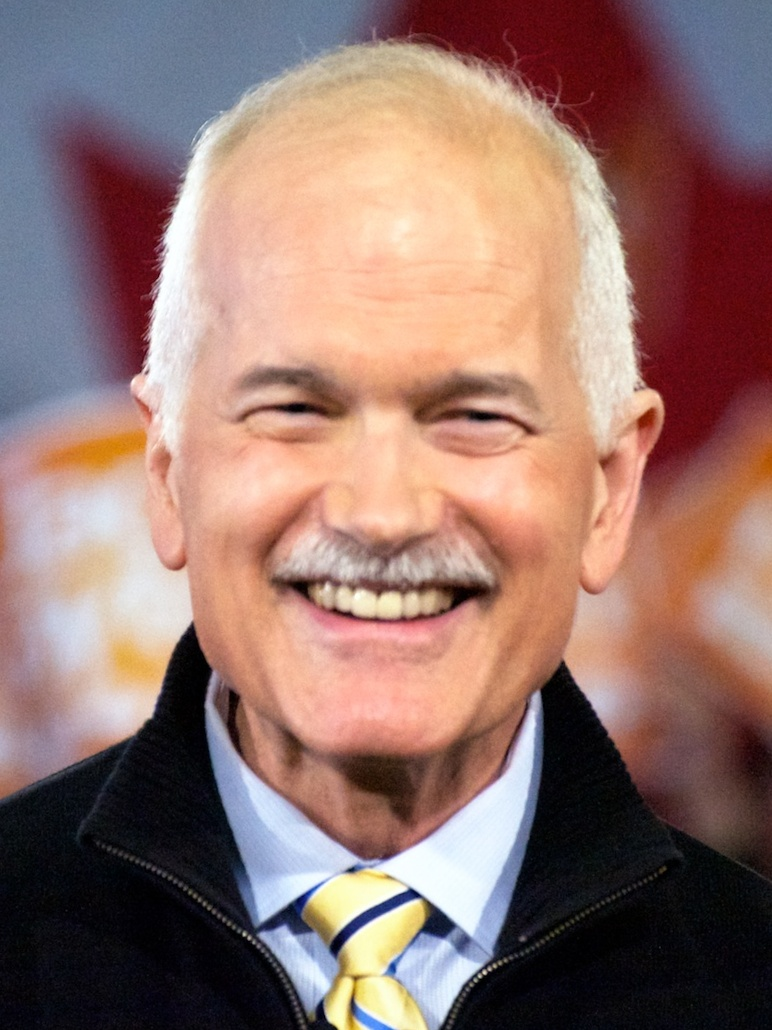

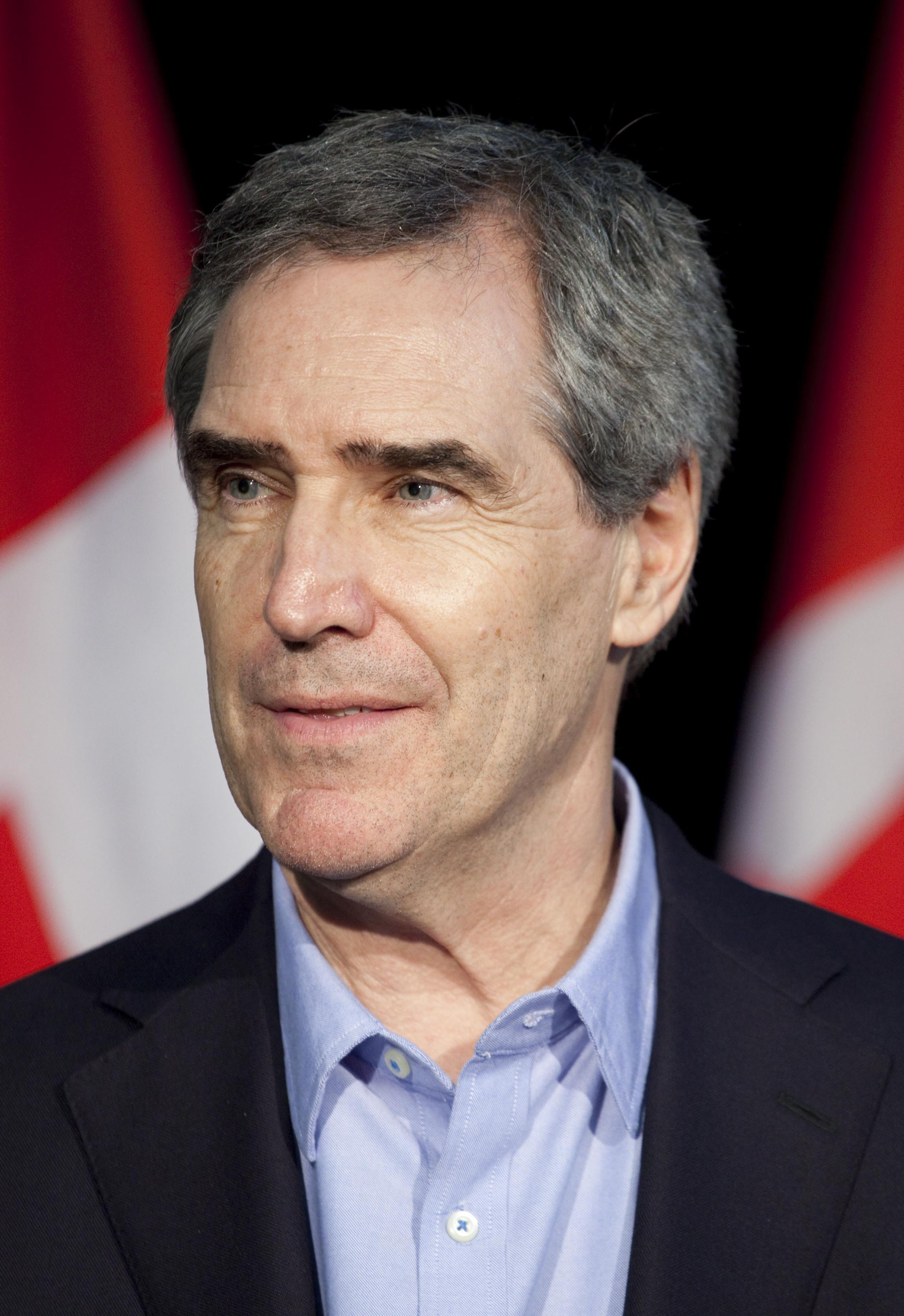

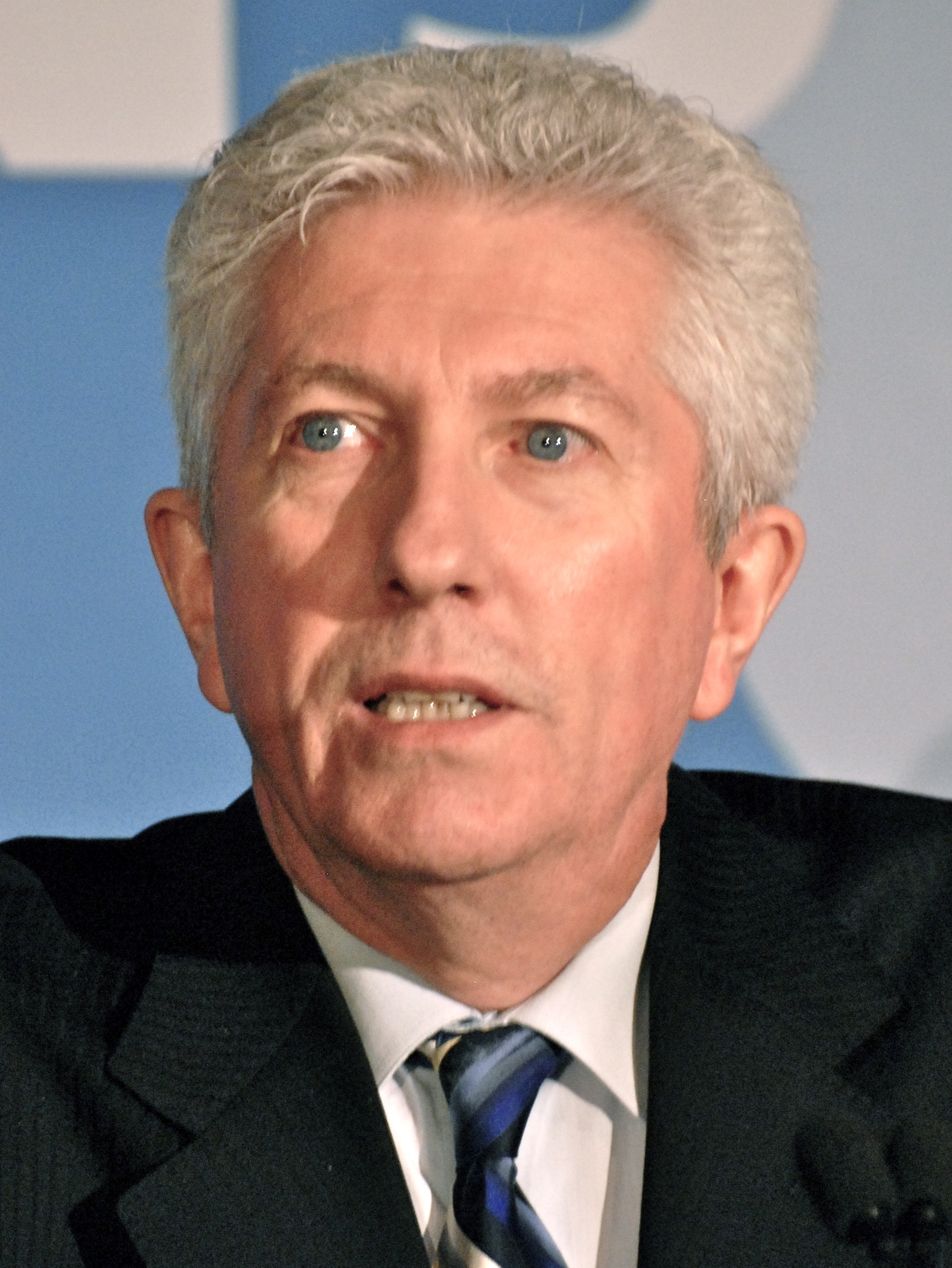

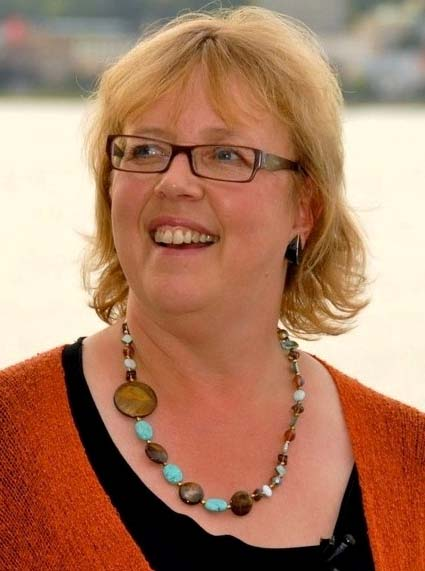
	First party	Second party	Third party
Leader	Stephen Harper	Jack Layton	Michael Ignatieff
Party	Conservative	New Democratic	Liberal
Leader since	March 20, 2004	January 25, 2003	May 2, 2009
Leader's seat	Calgary Southwest	Toronto—Danforth	Etobicoke—Lakeshore (lost re-election)
Last election	143 seats, 37.65%	37 seats, 18.18%	77 seats, 26.26%
Seats before	143	36	77
Seats won	166	103	34
Seat change	▲23	▲67	▼43
Popular vote	5,832,401	4,508,474	2,783,175
Percentage	39.62%	30.63%	18.91%
Swing	▲1.97 pp	▲12.45 pp	▼7.35 pp
	Fourth party	Fifth party
Leader	Gilles Duceppe	Elizabeth May
Party	Bloc Québécois	Green
Leader since	March 15, 1997	August 27, 2006
Leader's seat	Laurier—Sainte-Marie (lost re-election)	Ran in Saanich—Gulf Islands (won)
Last election	49 seats, 9.98%	0 seats, 6.78%
Seats before	47	0
Seats won	4	1
Seat change	▼43	▲1
Popular vote	889,788	576,221
Percentage	6.04%	3.91%
Swing	▼3.94 pp	▼2.87 pp
Prime Minister before election
Stephen Harper
Conservative
Prime Minister after election
Stephen Harper
Conservative

The 2011 Canadian federal election was held on May 2, 2011, to elect members to the House of Commons of the 41st Canadian Parliament.

The writs of election for the 2011 election were issued by Governor General David Johnston on March 26. Prime Minister Stephen Harper advised the Governor General to dissolve parliament after the House of Commons passed a motion of non-confidence against the government, finding it to be in contempt of Parliament. A few days before, the three opposition parties had rejected the minority government's proposed budget.

The Conservative Party remained in power, increasing its seat count from a minority to a majority government, marking the first election since 1988 that a right-of-centre party formed a majority government. The Liberal Party, sometimes dubbed the "natural governing party", was reduced to third party status for the first time as they won the fewest seats in its history, and party leader Michael Ignatieff was defeated in his riding. The Bloc Québécois lost official party status for the first time since contesting general elections in 1993. Party leader Gilles Duceppe was defeated in his riding and subsequently resigned as leader. The New Democratic Party led by Jack Layton won the largest number of seats in its history, enabling it to form the Official Opposition for the first time in the party's history, as they made a major breakthrough in Quebec, though they still trailed the Conservative Party by almost ten points. The Green Party elected its first member to the House of Commons with its leader, Elizabeth May, becoming MP for Saanich—Gulf Islands.

To date, this is the only election in Canadian history in which the modern day Conservative Party won a majority of seats and one of only two times that any party achieved a majority of seats in an election since the modern Conservative Party's founding in 2003 (the other time being the Liberal Party in the 2015 election).

== Background ==
The 2008 federal election resulted in the continuation of the incumbent Conservative minority government, headed by Stephen Harper. The 40th Parliament was marked by two controversial prorogations: the first in December 2008 which ended an attempted opposition coalition, and the second a year following, which prompted public protests. Following the first prorogation, Michael Ignatieff and the Liberal Party provided support for the government of Prime Minister Stephen Harper. On August 31, 2009, the Liberals withdrew their backing but the NDP under Jack Layton abstained and the Conservatives survived the confidence motion. Ignatieff's attempt to force a September 2009 election was reported as a miscalculation, as polls showed that most Canadians did not want another election. Ignatieff's popularity as well as that of the Liberals dropped off considerably immediately afterwards.

In 2011, Elections Canada laid charges against the Conservative Party, alleging contraventions of the Canada Elections Act five years earlier. This issue, along with the Bloc Québécois announcing its intention to vote against the budget, unless it contained numerous changes including $2 billion in compensation to Quebec for harmonizing PST and GST and funding for a new NHL arena in Quebec City, increased the speculation that there would be an election called soon as the Conservatives rejected the Bloc demands as "blackmail".

On March 9, 2011, Speaker of the House of Commons Peter Milliken ruled that Bev Oda, a minister of the Crown, and, separately, the Cabinet itself could both possibly be in contempt of parliament, the latter for its ongoing refusal to meet opposition requests for details of proposed bills and their cost estimates. Milliken directed both matters to committee and set as the deadline for its report March 21, 2011, one day before the budget was to be tabled. The committee found the government to be in contempt of Parliament. The vote divided along party lines, with the governing but minority Conservative members of Parliament (MPs) opposing the finding and issuing a dissenting report. After the committee released its findings, opposition leader and head of the Liberal Party Michael Ignatieff proposed a motion of no confidence against the Crown-in-Council, and on March 25, 2011, the House of Commons voted on the motion, the majority agreeing, by a margin of 156 to 145, with the committee's conclusions. A cabinet being found in contempt of parliament was without precedent in Canada or any other Commonwealth country. Earlier that week, all three opposition parties had indicated that they would oppose the government's budget; the NDP said that the concessions that the Conservatives made did not go far enough.

== Campaign slogans ==
The parties' campaign slogans for the 2011 election:

- Bloc Québécois: "Parlons Québec" (Let's talk about Quebec)
- Conservative Party: "Here For Canada / Ici pour le Canada". In francophone Quebec, Harper ran under the slogan "Notre région au pouvoir" (Our Region in Power).
- Green Party: "It's Time" & "Canada needs Elizabeth May but only you can elect her"
- Liberal Party: "Rise Up Canada" & "Change we need, from a proven team." The first one refers to Harper's contempt charge. The second one was used after the NDP's surge in the opinion polls, making reference to the fact that it has never formed a federal government.
- New Democratic Party: "Working For Families / Travaillons ensemble", "You have a choice", and "That's Canadian Leadership"

== Timeline ==
March 25, 2011	The Liberal Party's no-confidence motion passes the House 156–145, and the Prime Minister moves for the House to adjourn.
March 26, 2011	Governor General David Johnston agrees to dissolve the 40th Parliament following a meeting with Prime Minister Stephen Harper.
April 12, 2011	English leaders' debate.
April 13, 2011	French leaders' debate.
April 22, 23 and 25, 2011	Advance polls open
May 2, 2011	Polling Day
May 23, 2011	Return of Writs
June 2, 2011	41st Parliament convenes

== Issues ==
Category	Issue	Details
Crime and law enforcement	Internet surveillance and warrant-less wiretapping	The Conservatives promised to re-introduce Internet surveillance legislation that they were not able to pass, and bundle it with the rest of their crime bills. They said they plan to fast track the legislation within 100 days after taking office.
Crime and law enforcement	Long gun registry	Harper pledged to scrap the long-gun registry.
Crime and law enforcement	Crime strategies	The Conservative platform included a promise to consolidate twelve crime bills into at least one omnibus bill and pass it within 100 days of forming a majority government. The bills included within that list would crack down on organized drug crime, end house arrest for violent criminals and establish tougher sentences and mandatory jail time for sexual offences against children. The opposition parties claimed the crime bills were not costed fully, and the opposition parties countered that this would create a US style system of prisons. The Conservatives have not released the costs for expanding the prison system. The other parties state that more focus should be given on crime prevention, so that it doesn't happen in the first place. The New Democratic Party (NDP) stated that their promise to hire 2,500 more police officers to patrol the streets, will help in preventing crime from occurring in the first place.
Defence policy		The Conservatives plan to purchase 65 F-35 Lightning II jet fighters. Stating that "Our defence policy is broken", the NDP announced that they would prioritize investment in naval ships over new fighter jets. The NDP stated that this would be a good opportunity to keep shipbuilding expertise and jobs in Canada.
Economy and fiscal policy	Balanced budget and recession	Conservatives argued that they steered the economy through the 2008 financial crisis, and promised to eliminate the budget deficit by 2014–15. Former Prime Minister Paul Martin, campaigning for the Liberals, challenged assertions, noting that his Liberal government left a $13 billion budget surplus, before the Conservatives took power. In 2010, Paul Martin had been invited to the prestigious Global ARC conference to discuss that elimination of the Canadian government deficit. Martin also claimed that when he was Finance minister working under Jean Chretien, his blocking of proposed bank mergers is what actually sheltered Canada from the worst effects of the recession. The New Democratic Party (NDP) released its platform promising a balanced budget in four years. After the NDP surge, the Liberals called the NDP platform "science fiction" stating it contains over $30 billion in new spending derived from sources that are not credible, and that implementing a cap and trade system that would take years to realize rather than provide the in-year contributions as claimed.
Economy and fiscal policy	Corporate tax cuts and job creation strategy	The Conservatives stated that their plan to cut corporate taxes from 16.5% to 15%, will create more jobs. Harper stated that an increase in corporate taxes will create job losses across Canada. Layton countered by saying currently the jobs are shipped overseas, and pledged a $4,500 job creation tax credit to all businesses per new hire. Layton further went to say that small business are the ones creating more jobs, thus he promised to lower the tax rate for small business from 11% to 9%. He then went on to say the big business are using the corporate tax cuts by providing their CEOs with big bonuses, and thus pledged to increase their tax rate to 19.5%. The Liberals on the other hand, will raise the rate to 18%, stating that it will be competitive but not excessively low.
Economy and fiscal policy	Increasing Canada Pension Plan	The NDP promised a gradual doubling of Canada Pension Plan and QPP benefits, in conjunction with the provinces, with an increase in payroll deductions of as much as 2.5 per cent.
Economy and fiscal policy	HST referendum in BC	If BC voters were to reject the Harmonized Sales Tax in the upcoming referendum, the NDP promised to ensure that the penalties to be imposed by Ottawa on the HST agreement will be cancelled.
Economy and fiscal policy	Personal taxation	Conservatives promised income splitting for tax purposes for families with children to be implemented once the budget is balanced in 2013.
Electoral reform and political honesty	Political honesty	The New Democratic Party stated that both the Conservatives and the Liberals cannot be trusted. The NDP accused the Conservatives of creating "Liberal-style scandals" and accused the Liberals of flip-flopping on issues such as corporate tax cuts, and the Afghanistan mission. Throughout the election various polls had shown the political honesty issue to be low on the list of priorities for voters. Post-media conducted a survey that found health care, the economy, taxes and jobs all more important to Canadians. Further, half of voters identified Harper as the best suited to be Prime Minister followed by Layton with one third support and Ignatieff with less than twenty percent support. On the question of a hidden agenda, Ignatieff is viewed by three times more of those polled to have a hidden agenda than Harper.
Electoral reform and political honesty	Political financing	Conservatives pledged to phase-out per-vote subsidy over two years, with its eventual cancellation.
Electoral reform and political honesty	Senate	Stephen Harper promised Senate reform without changing the constitution. The NDP pledged to abolish the Senate, stating it is a waste of tax revenues and a form of patronage.
Promised government programs	Newfoundland hydroelectric project and Quebec's HST	Conservatives, New Democrats and Liberals promised $4.2 billion in loan guarantees to support the Lower Churchill River power project. Due to outcry from Quebec over the pledge to provide loan guarantees for the Lower Churchill project, the Conservatives promise Quebec a $2.2 billion transfer to ease the Quebec Sales Tax to Harmonized Sales Tax transition.
Promised government programs	Post-secondary education	Liberals promised a "Learning Passport" for high school students seeking post-secondary education. The NDP's plan is to reduce the tuition fees, by increasing transfer payments to the Provinces.
Promised government programs	Immigration Fairness Commissioner	Liberals proposed the establishment of an "Immigration Fairness Commissioner" to provide oversight on the entry of immigrants with professional qualifications (doctors, engineers, etc.), and to increase the number of family reunification visas.
Health care		The NDP pledged to train 1,200 more doctors and 6,000 more nurses. All parties promised to continue to increase healthcare transfers to provinces by 6% annually.
Government regulations	Improved internet and usage based billing	The New Democratic Party (NDP) promised a ban on all forms of usage based billing by ISPs, and enshrine net neutrality in law, which would prevent bandwidth throttling. The Liberals promised net neutrality as well as "functional separation" with regards to usage based billing as well as enshrining net neutrality in law, which would prevent bandwidth throttling. Almost all of the established parties, with the exception of the Conservatives, outlined policies that they claim will improve Canadian Internet access.
Government regulations	Cap on credit card interest rates	The NDP promised to cap credit card rates at five percentage points above the Bank of Canada's prime interest rate.

== Election campaign ==
=== Controversies and gaffes ===
A number of controversies took place during the election campaign.

=== Leaders' debates ===
The English- and French-language debates took place on April 12 and 13 respectively.

On March 29, the consortium of broadcasters playing host to the debates (the CBC, CTV, Global, Radio-Canada and TVA) announced that it would only invite the leaders of the four recognized parties in the House of Commons, namely, the Conservative Party, the Liberal Party, the Bloc Québécois and the New Democratic (NDP). Therefore, the Green Party was excluded, despite earning 6.8 per cent of the popular vote in the 2008 federal election.

On March 30, Stephen Harper challenged Michael Ignatieff to a one-on-one televised debate. Although Ignatieff accepted the challenge, this was opposed by the other opposition parties. The idea was later rejected by the broadcast consortium and cancelled.

On April 1, comedian Rick Mercer suggested over Twitter hosting a one-on-one debate between Stephen Harper and Michael Ignatieff at Toronto's Massey Hall. He later added he would donate $50,000 to the charities of their choosing if they were willing to participate. Ignatieff immediately accepted the challenge and named the Alzheimer Society as his charity of choice, as his mother succumbed to Alzheimer's disease in 1992. Harper did not respond to the challenge.

In an interview with The Globe and Mail published on April 1, Troy Reeb, the broadcast consortium chairman, discussed the process behind setting up the leaders' debates and the rationale for various decisions made, including the decision to exclude the Green Party's leader Elizabeth May.

On April 5, the Federal Court rejected the Green Party's request for an expedited hearing on the matter prior to the scheduled debates.

On April 10, the date of the French leaders debate was changed from April 14 to 13 due to worries of broadcasting conflicts with the NHL playoffs scheduled for April 14. Also on April 10, Elizabeth May participated in a panel interview on CHCH-TV in Hamilton, which she was invited to attend, as were the leaders of the Bloc, Liberals, New Democrats and Conservatives, by Channel Zero, whose president was disappointed by May's exclusion from the leaders' debates.

=== Small parties public forum ===
A joint press conference and public forum was staged by 11 of the 18 registered parties and one unregistered party on April 23, 2011, at York University. Forum organizers invited the leaders from all registered political parties who do not have seats in parliament. Parties were able to explain their platforms and responded to questions from the audience. As a forum, the goal was an inter-party discussion of major issues, however some debate did occur.

Participants in the forum were the Animal Alliance Environmental Voters, the Canadian Action Party, the Christian Heritage Party, the Communist Party, the First Peoples National, the Libertarian Party, the Marijuana Party, the Marxist–Leninist Party, the Rhinoceros Party, and the Pirate Party.

Green Party leader Elizabeth May refused to participate in the forum claiming they are not one of "the small, fringe parties".

== Opinion polls ==
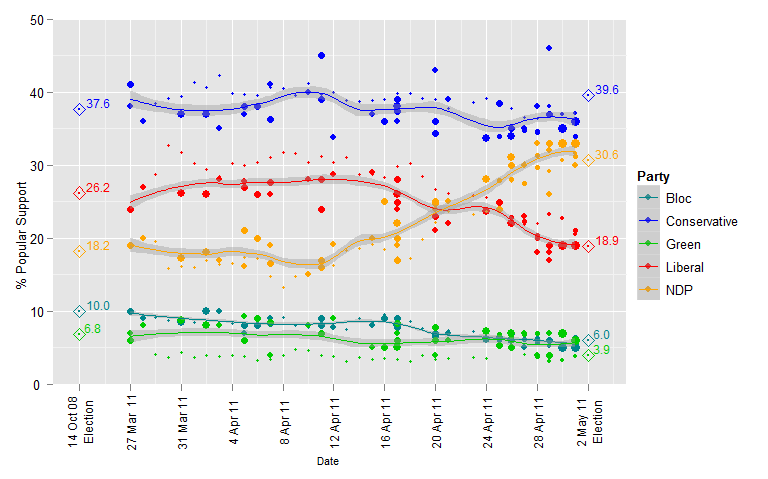

=== New Democratic Party surge ===
In the week before the leaders debate, on April 8, a poll showed the New Democratic Party (NDP) support at 13.2%. A reversal of fortune began on April 16, when an Angus Reid poll indicated a tie in support for the NDP and the Liberals, both polling at 25%. The New Democrats' poll numbers then moved significantly ahead of the Liberals and slightly or moderately behind the Conservatives.

The surge began in Quebec, with the NDP surprising many observers by surpassing the previously front-running Bloc in Quebec. In the entirety of Canada, the NDP surged past the Liberals to take the second place behind the Conservatives; in Quebec, the NDP took first place. The NDP surge became the dominant narrative of the last week of the campaign, as other parties turned their attacks on the party. Ruth Ellen Brosseau, the NDP candidate in Berthier—Maskinongé, won despite not running a campaign, barely speaking French at this time and being on holiday in Las Vegas at the time of the election. The NDP's rise in popularity was nicknamed Orange Crush, an allusion to the soft drink with the same name and the party's colour. It was also nicknamed the Orange Wave.

== Election spending ==
Pre-campaign, there are no limits to what a political party, candidate, or third party can spend — spending rules are only in force once the writ is dropped and the campaign has officially begun.

Spending limits for the 2011 federal election
	Spending Limit	Notes
Political Parties	$21,025,793.23	If full slate of 308 candidates.
Party Candidates (Average electoral district)	$28,244,498.50 ($91,702.92)	If full slate of 308 candidates. Each electoral district is subject to specific spending limits according to population and density. The limits for candidates varied from $69,635 in the electoral district of Malpeque, Prince Edward Island, to $134,352 in Oak Ridges–Markham, Ontario.
Third Parties (corporations, unions, special interest groups, etc.)	$150,000	Election advertising expenses limit. Of that amount, no more than $3,000 can be incurred to promote or oppose the election of one or more candidates in a particular electoral district.

Election spending during the 2011 federal election
Party	Total Spending (% of limit)	Party Election Spending (% of limit)	Total Candidate Spending (% of limit)	# Candidates Spending > 75% of Candidate Limit	# Candidates Spending > 50% of Candidate Limit
Conservative	$39,175,131 (80%)	$19,519,995 (93%)	$19,655,136 (70%)	173	228
NDP	$27,490,193 (56%)	$20,372,231 (97%)	$7,117,962 (25%)	44	70
Liberal	$34,025,109 (69%)	$19,507,746 (93%)	$14,517,363 (41%)	91	169

== Endorsements ==
Most major newspapers endorsed the Conservatives, and none solely endorsed the Liberals or Greens. Canada's highest circulated newspaper, the Toronto Star, endorsed the NDP but also advised readers to vote against the Conservatives.

== Candidates by party ==
Articles on parties' candidates for the 41st election:

- Animal Alliance Environmental Voters
- Bloc Québécois
- Christian Heritage
- Communist
- Conservative
- Green
- Independent and no affiliation
- Liberal
- Libertarian
- Marxist–Leninist
- New Democrats

== Results ==
Popular vote by province, with graphs indicating the number of seats won within that province or territory. (Because seats are awarded by the popular vote in each riding, the provincial popular vote does not necessarily translate to more seats.).

The disproportionality of parliament in the 2011 election was 12.45 according to the Gallagher Index, mainly between the Conservatives and NDP on the one hand, and the Liberal, BQ and Green parties on the other.

Summary of the May 2, 2011 House of Commons of Canada election results
Party	Party leader	Candidates	Seats					Popular vote			
Party	Party leader	Candidates	2008	Dissol.	2011	% Change	% seats	#	# Change	%	pp Change
Conservative	Stephen Harper	307	143	143	166	+16.08%	53.90%	5,835,270	+626,201	39.63%	+1.98pp
New Democratic	Jack Layton	308	37	36	103	+178.38%	33.44%	4,512,411	+1,997,123	30.65%	+12.47pp
Liberal	Michael Ignatieff	308^{1}	77	77	34	−42.86%	11.04%	2,783,076	−850,109	18.90%	−7.36pp
Bloc Québécois	Gilles Duceppe	75	49	47	4	−91.84%	1.30%	891,425	−488,566	6.05%	−3.92pp
Green	Elizabeth May	304	—	—	1	n/a	0.32%	572,095	−365,518	3.89%	−2.89pp
Independent and No Affiliation		61	2	2	—	−100%	—	72,861	−21,983	0.49%	−0.19pp
Christian Heritage	James Hnatiuk	46	—	—	—	—	—	18,910	−7,565	0.13%	−0.06pp
Marxist–Leninist	Anna Di Carlo	70	—	—	—	—	—	9,925	+1,360	0.07%	+0.01pp
Libertarian	Dennis Young	23	—	—	—	—	—	6,002	−1,298	0.04%	−0.01pp
Progressive Canadian	Sinclair Stevens	9	—	—	—	—	—	5,790	−70	0.04%	—
Rhinoceros^{2}	François Gourd	14	—	—	—	—	—	3,800	+1,678	0.03%	+0.01pp
Pirate	Mikkel Paulson	10	*	—	—	*	—	3,197	*	0.02%	*
Communist	Miguel Figueroa	20	—	—	—	—	—	2,894	−678	0.02%	−0.01pp
Canadian Action	Christopher Porter	12	—	—	—	—	—	1,951	−1,504	0.01%	−0.01pp
Marijuana	Blair Longley	5	—	—	—	—	—	1,756	−542	0.01%	—
Animal Alliance	Liz White	7	—	—	—	—	—	1,344	+817	0.01%	+0.01pp
Western Block	Doug Christie	4	—	—	—	—	—	751	+326	0.01%	—
United	Brian Jedan	3	*	—	—	*	—	293	*	0.00%	*
First Peoples National	Will Morin	1	—	—	—	—	—	229	−1,382	0.00%	−0.01pp
Vacant				3							
Total		1,587	308	308	308	±0.0%	100.0%	14,723,980	+886,286	100%	
Source: Elections Canada

1. André Forbes of Manicouagan was nominated as a Liberal, but lost party support after being nominated, and continued to run as an independent; he is listed here as a Liberal rather than an independent, as he was listed as a Liberal on the ballot.
2. The Rhinoceros Party contested the previous federal election under the name Neorhino.ca.
3. People's Political Power Party of Canada failed to run candidates in the 2011 election and was deregistered by Elections Canada on April 13, 2011.

The voter turnout was 61.1%.

Elections to the 41st Parliament of Canada – seats won/lost by party, 2008–2011
Party	2008	Gain from (loss to)									2011
Party	2008	Con		NDP		Lib		BQ	Grn	Ind	2011
Conservative	143			2	(6)	27			(1)	1	166
New Democratic	37	6	(2)			17	(1)	45		1	103
Liberal	77		(27)	1	(17)						34
Bloc Québécois	49				(45)						4
Green	–	1									1
Independent	2		(1)		(1)						–
Total	308	7	(30)	3	(69)	44	(1)	45	(1)	2	308

Resulting composition of the 41st Parliament of Canada
Source		Party					
Source		Con	NDP	Lib	BQ	Grn	Total
Seats retained	Incumbents returned	128	33	31	3		195
Seats retained	Open seats held	8	1	2	1		12
Seats retained	Ouster of incumbents changing affiliation	1					1
Seats changing hands	Incumbents defeated	26	61			1	88
Seats changing hands	Open seats gained	1	7				8
Seats changing hands	Byelection gains held	2		1			3
Seats changing hands	Ouster of 3rd-party byelection gain		1				1
Total		166	103	34	4	1	308

=== Analysis ===
Ternary plots - shift of electoral support (2008-2011)
2008

2011
Electoral districts identified by colours of winning parties

Popular vote
Conservative	39.62%
New Democratic	30.63%
Liberal	18.91%
Bloc Québécois	6.04%
Green	3.91%
Others	0.89%

Seat totals
Conservative	53.90%
New Democratic	33.44%
Liberal	11.04%
Bloc Québécois	1.30%
Green	0.32%

=== Results by province ===
Party name		BC	AB	SK	MB	ON	QC	NB	NS	PE	NL	YT	NT	NU	Total
Conservative	Seats:	21	27	13	11	73	5	8	4	1	1	1	0	1	166
Conservative	Vote:	45.5	66.8	56.3	53.5	44.4	16.5	43.9	36.7	41.2	28.4	33.8	32.1	49.9	39.6
New Democratic	Seats:	12	1	0	2	22	59	1	3	0	2	0	1	0	103
New Democratic	Vote:	32.5	16.8	32.3	25.8	25.6	42.9	29.8	30.3	15.4	32.6	14.4	45.8	19.4	30.6
Liberal	Seats:	2	0	1	1	11	7	1	4	3	4	0	0	0	34
Liberal	Vote:	13.4	9.3	8.6	16.6	25.3	14.2	22.6	28.9	41.0	37.9	33.0	18.4	28.6	18.9
Bloc Québécois	Seats:	—N/a					4	—N/a							4
Bloc Québécois	Vote:	—N/a					23.4	—N/a							6.0
Green	Seats:	1	0	0	0	0	0	0	0	0	0	0	0	0	1
Green	Vote:	7.7	5.3	2.7	3.6	3.8	2.1	3.2	4.0	2.4	0.9	18.9	3.1	2.1	3.9
Independent and no affiliation	Vote:	0.2	1.3	0.2	0.1	0.2	0.6	0.5			0.3				0.4
Total seats		36	28	14	14	106	75	10	11	4	7	1	1	1	308

== Post-election ==
Cartographical analysis of 2011 results
Results by riding. Shading refers to strength of popular vote.

Identification of ridings gained by each party, relative to 2008.

Identification of ridings lost by each party, relative to 2008.

=== Overview of results ===
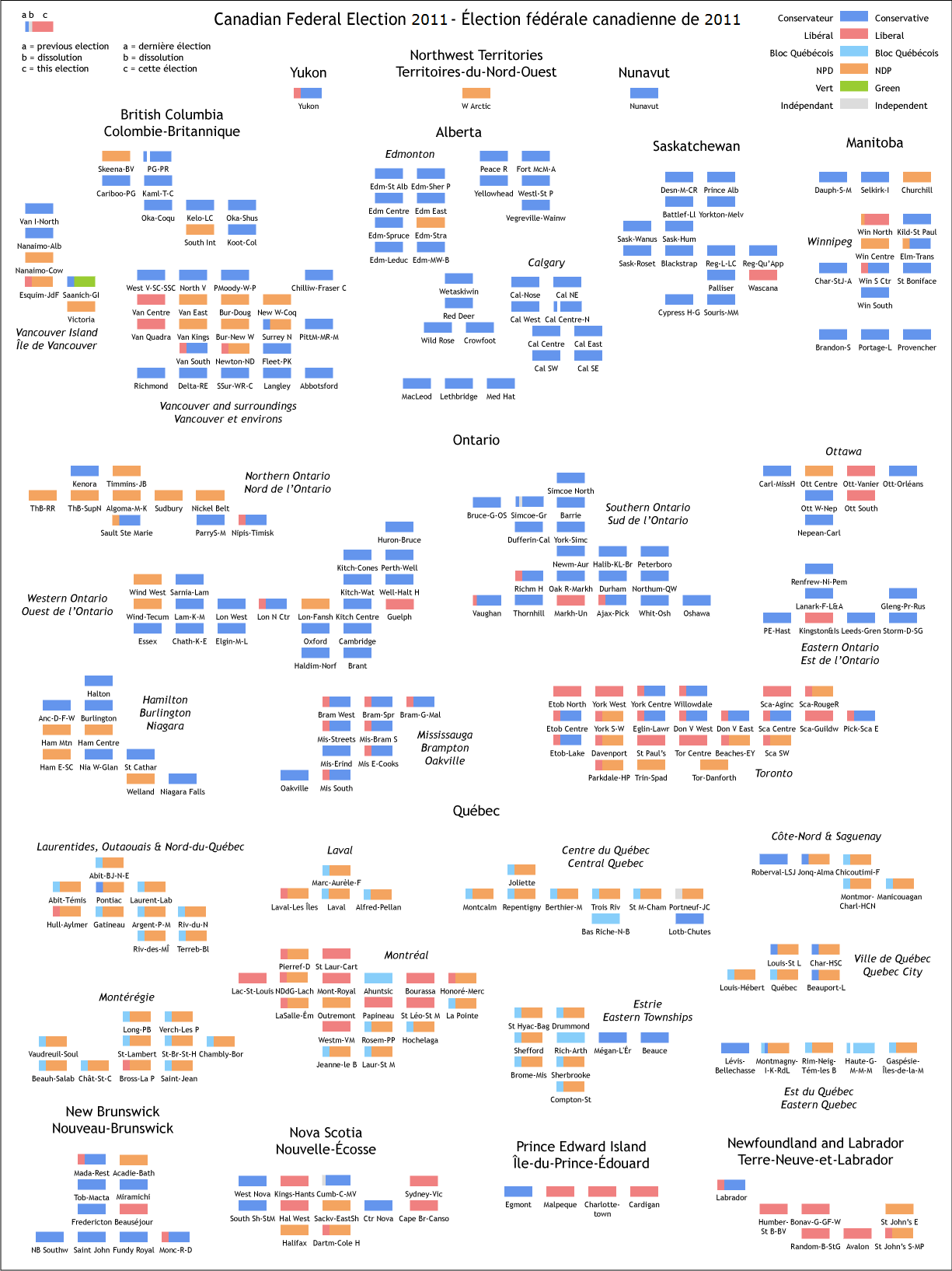
Analysis of results by riding, together with comparisons from previous election and at dissolution.

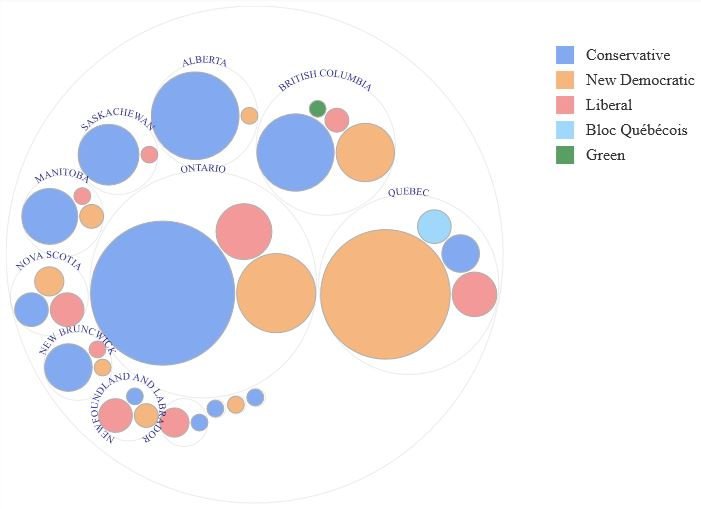
Canada Federal Election 2011 by Province

Rendition of party representation in the 41st Canadian Parliament decided by this election Conservatives (166) New Democrats (103) Liberals (34) Bloc Québécois (4) Green Party (1)

With an overall voter turnout of 61.4% and 14,823,408 ballots cast, the Conservative Party remained in power, moving from a minority to a majority government by winning 166 of the 308 seats. The New Democratic Party won the largest number of seats in their history, including a large majority of seats in Quebec (where they had previously only ever elected two candidates (Note: The only NDP candidates elected in Quebec before 2011 were Thomas Mulcair and Phil Edmonston, the latter in a 1990 by-election.)) and formed the Official Opposition for the first time. The Liberal Party won the fewest seats in their history and party leader Michael Ignatieff was defeated in his own riding. (Note: The previous lowest seat total for the Liberals was 40 in the 1984 election.) The Bloc Québécois, which had always won at least a majority of seats in Quebec in every election of their existence, lost nearly all their seats, and thus also their official party status, including the seat of their leader Gilles Duceppe. Green Party leader Elizabeth May became the first Member of Parliament elected to represent the party.

=== Recounts ===
Elections Canada ordered three judicial recounts, and an elector initiated a fourth. The Canada Elections Act states that "a judicial recount is required when the difference in votes between the first- and second-place candidates is less than one one-thousandth of the total votes cast in a riding," and allows an elector or candidate in any riding to approach a judge and request a recount regardless of the final result. In all four ridings, Etobicoke Centre, Montmagny—L'Islet—Kamouraska—Rivière-du-Loup, Nipissing—Timiskaming, and Winnipeg North, the validated result was confirmed:

- As initially validated by election officials, Conservative Party candidate Ted Opitz defeated Liberal incumbent Borys Wrzesnewskyj in Etobicoke Centre by 25 votes, a margin increased by one in the recount. Citing potential voter registration irregularities, however, Wrzesnewskyj has sought to have the result overturned by the courts, filing a formal motion with the Ontario Superior Court in spring 2012. On October 25, 2012, the Supreme Court of Canada upheld Opitz's narrow victory.
- Initially, Conservative Jay Aspin defeated incumbent Anthony Rota of the Liberal Party by 15 votes in Nipissing—Timiskaming; the recount added three votes to the margin of victory.
- In Montmagny—L'Islet—Kamouraska—Rivière-du-Loup, incumbent Conservative MP Bernard Généreux was initially declared re-elected, but due to a counting error on election night, the seat was later determined to have been won by the NDP candidate François Lapointe by a margin of five votes. The recount confirmed Lapointe as the winner by nine votes.
- In Winnipeg North, a recount was requested by an elector; the difference between Liberal Kevin Lamoureux, the victor, and New Democrat Rebecca Blaikie was just 45 votes, reduced by one vote in the recount.

=== Opposition party leadership changes ===
Ignatieff announced on May 3, 2011, that he would step down as leader of the Liberal Party when it chose his successor. Ignatieff took a teaching position at the University of Toronto after his defeat in Etobicoke—Lakeshore. He decided to teach classes in the law faculty, the department of political science, the Munk School of Global Affairs and the School of Public Policy and Governance. Ignatieff stated that, "The life that I like the best is teaching. It's the end of my life as a politician". Bob Rae, Liberal MP for Toronto Centre and former Premier of Ontario (1990 to 1995, as a New Democrat), subsequently became interim leader of the Liberal Party, with a Liberal leadership election which took place April 14, 2013, during which Justin Trudeau was chosen as leader.

Duceppe resigned as Bloc Québécois leader on election night following his defeat. Louis Plamondon, MP for Bas-Richelieu—Nicolet—Bécancour and Dean of the House, subsequently became interim parliamentary leader of the Bloc. Former MP Daniel Paillé, who lost his seat in the election, won the Bloc leadership election to succeed Duceppe on December 11, 2011.

On July 25, 2011, Jack Layton took a leave of absence to fight a newly diagnosed cancer. Nycole Turmel, former union leader and newly elected MP for Hull—Aylmer, was named interim leader of the New Democratic Party. On August 22, Layton died. Turmel became opposition leader. A leadership election was held on March 24, 2012, and Tom Mulcair was elected leader of the New Democratic Party.

=== Controversies ===
The losing parties in the Berthier—Maskinongé riding claimed that the nomination papers for Ruth Ellen Brosseau, the newly elected NDP Member of Parliament for the riding, had irregularities. Some of the alleged irregularities include writing an address instead of signing, missing signatures, people thinking they were signing a petition for the NDP to name a candidate in the riding and one person not remembering that he signed her nomination papers even though he admitted that the signature looks like his. The NDP denied the allegations. Elections Canada has insisted that Brosseau's nomination papers were legitimate. Elections Canada stated that "The decision to overturn or uphold the results is at the discretion of the courts and not Elections Canada".

The Liberal Party of Canada attracted controversy regarding the past racist comments and White supremacist history of one of its candidates in northern Quebec, Andre Forbes. His history as a white supremacist activist and past hate speech against Muslims, First Nations and LGBTQ+ people was uncovered by the NDP. Liberal leader Michael Ignatieff immediately removed Forbes as a candidate.

==== Voter suppression scandal ====
In early 2012, there were allegations of voter suppression during the election, starting the robocall scandal. Elections Canada and the Royal Canadian Mounted Police (RCMP) investigated claims that robocalls were used in an attempt to dissuade voters from casting their ballot by telling them their poll stations had changed location. While the Elections Canada investigation initially focused on calls sent into Guelph amidst nationwide complaints, the investigation continued to expand in scope and to examine complaints in other ridings across the country. Reports of fraudulent automated or live calls targeting opposition supporters were published in 100 ridings and Elections Canada acknowledged it was investigating telephone election fraud complaints in 247 of Canada's 308 federal ridings.

On March 27, 2012, the Council of Canadians announced that they had launched a lawsuit in the Federal Court of Canada to ask for by-elections to be ordered in seven ridings where complaints were received and where Conservatives had won by slim margins. The ridings named were Don Valley East, Winnipeg South Centre, Saskatoon-Rosetown-Biggar, Vancouver Island North, Yukon, Nipissing-Timiskaming and Elmwood-Transcona. The case was heard over two weeks starting December 9, 2012. Justice Richard G. Mosley ruled in May 2013 that fraud had occurred in Guelph and that voting irregularities and misconduct occurred in all six of the contested ridings, but that it was not significant enough to warrant overturning the election results. The judge also ruled that the mostly likely source of the fraud was the Conservative Party of Canada's (using the CIMS database) and that there was no evidence that its use was approved by the CPC.

In April 2013, a criminal charge in the matter was laid on Michael Sona, a former Conservative staffer who was the communications officer and official Ottawa liaison for the Guelph Conservative campaign. In August 2014, he was convicted of the charge.

==== Riding of Vaughan ====
In a further scandal, Elections Canada was called on to investigate the finances of Associate Minister of National Defence Julian Fantino's election finances after three former Conservative riding executives from Vaughan signed affidavits alleging impropriety in Fantino's 2010 and 2011 election campaigns. They alleged there was a second, secret, illegal bank account containing $300,000.

=== Commentary ===
In the wake of the election, pundits widely believed in a theme of major political realignment. The Economist said, "the election represents the biggest realignment of Canadian politics since 1993." Lawrence Martin, commentator for The Globe and Mail, claimed that "Harper has completed a remarkable reconstruction of a Canadian political landscape that endured for more than a century. The realignment sees both old parties of the moderate middle, the Progressive Conservatives and the Liberals, either eliminated or marginalized." Writing for Maclean's, Andrew Coyne proclaimed "The West is in and Ontario has joined it," observing that the Conservatives achieved their majority predominantly due to strength in both Ontario and the western provinces (an electoral combination that was historically unlikely due to the low population of the latter); this, he argued, marked "the new axis of Canadian politics", and that "the Conservatives are now in a position to replace the Liberals as the natural governing party in Canada." Books such as The Big Shift by John Ibbitson and Darrell Bricker, and Peter C. Newman's When the Gods Changed: The Death of Liberal Canada, provocatively asserted that the Liberals had become an "endangered species" and that an NDP-led opposition would mean that "fortune favours the Harper government" in subsequent campaigns. However, the resurgence of the Liberal Party in the 2015 election has since challenged that narrative.

== Student vote results ==
Student votes are mock elections that run parallel to actual elections, in which students not of voting age participate. They are administered by Student Vote Canada. Student vote elections are for educational purposes and do not count towards the results. Though there were 308 ridings, only 301 were declared.

Summary of the 2011 Canadian Student Vote
Party	Leader	Seats		Popular vote	
Party	Leader	Elected	%	Votes	%
Conservative	Stephen Harper	130	42.2	166,893	30.97
New Democratic	Jack Layton	113	36.7	140,157	26.01
Liberal	Michael Ignatieff	47	15.3	106,166	19.70
Bloc Québécois	Gilles Duceppe	6	1.9	7,011	1.30
Green	Elizabeth May	5	1.6	93,140	17.29
Other		0	0	25,479	4.73
Total		301*	100.00	538,846	100.00
Source: Student Vote Canada

== See also ==
- 2011 Bloc Québécois leadership election
- Controversies in the Canadian federal election, 2011
- 2013 Liberal Party of Canada leadership election
- List of Canadian federal general elections
- List of political parties in Canada
- Newspaper endorsements in the Canadian federal election, 2011
- Results of the 2011 Canadian federal election
- 2011 Canadian federal election in Quebec
