= Green Party of Canada candidates in the 2011 Canadian federal election =

This is a list of candidates for the Green Party of Canada in the 2011 federal election. Green Party candidates were present in 304 of the 308 total ridings, with only the ridings of Hamilton Centre, Etobicoke North, Willowdale, and Acadie-Bathurst left absent of Green Party candidates.

== Newfoundland and Labrador - 7 seats ==
Riding	Candidate's Name	Gender	Residence	Occupation	Votes	%	Rank	Notes
Avalon	Matthew Crowder	M			215			
Bonavista—Gander—Grand Falls—Windsor	Robyn Kenny				279			
Humber—St. Barbe—Baie Verte	Robin Gosse	M	Corner Brook	Student	253			
Labrador	George Barrett				139			
Random—Burin—St. George's	Tanya Gutmanis	F			307			
St. John's East	Robert Miller	M		Internet Professional	467			
St. John's South—Mount Pearl	Rick Austin	M	Paradise	Graphic Designer	291			

== Prince Edward Island - 4 seats ==
Riding	Candidate	Gender	Residence	Occupation	Votes	%	Rank	Biographical notes
Cardigan	Leslie Stewart	F			373			
Charlottetown	Eliza Knockwood	F			417			
Egmont	Carl Arnold	M	Summerside	Junior High School Teacher	320			
Malpeque	Peter Bevan-Baker	M	Hampton	Dentist	785			2008 Candidate for Malpeque, 1993/1997 candidate in Leeds—Grenville

== Nova Scotia - 11 seats ==
Riding	Candidate's Name	Gender	Residence	Occupation	Votes	%	Rank	Notes
Cape Breton—Canso	Glen Carabin	M	Dominion	Freelance writer	1,141			
Central Nova	Matthew Chisholm	M	Antigonish	Community Sustainability Organizer	1,406			
Cumberland—Colchester—Musquodoboit Valley	Jason Blanch	M	Amherst	Addiction counselor	2,109			
Dartmouth—Cole Harbour	Paul Shreenan	M	Dartmouth	Metro Transit worker	1,662			
Halifax	Michael Dewar	M	Halifax	Co-Chair of the Young Greens of Canada	2,020			
Halifax West	Thomas Trappenberg	M	Clayton Park	University professor	1,931			
Kings—Hants	Sheila Richardson	F	Wolfville	Business owner	1,520			
Sackville—Eastern Shore	John Percy	M			1,762			
South Shore—St. Margaret's	Kris MacLellan	M			1,579			
Sydney—Victoria	Chris Milburn	M			1,191			
West Nova	Ross Johnson	M	Saulnierville	Home inspector	1,487			

== New Brunswick - 10 seats ==
Riding	Candidate's Name	Gender	Residence	Occupation	Votes	%	Rank	Notes
Acadie—Bathurst	–	–	–	–	–	–	–	–
Beauséjour	Natalie Arsenault	F			1,913			
Fredericton	Louise Comeau	F			1,790			
Fundy Royal	Stephanie Coburn	F	Sussex		1,757			
Madawaska—Restigouche	Lynn Hemson-Morrison	F			612			
Miramichi	Ron Mazerolle	M			735			
Moncton—Riverview—Dieppe	Steven Steeves	M			2,016			
New Brunswick Southwest	Janice Harvey	F	Waweig		1,646			
Saint John	Sharon Murphy-Flatt	F			1,017			
Tobique—Mactaquac	Rish McGlynn	F			831			

== Quebec - 75 seats ==
Riding	Candidate's Name	Gender	Residence	Occupation	Votes	%	Rank	Notes
Abitibi—Baie-James—Nunavik—Eeyou	Johnny Kasudluak	M			1,221			
Abitibi—Témiscamingue	Patrick Rochon	M			694			
Ahuntsic	Theodore Kouretas	M			620			
Alfred-Pellan	Dylan Perceval-Maxwell	M			798			
Argenteuil—Papineau—Mirabel	Stephen Matthews	M			1,506			
Bas-Richelieu—Nicolet—Bécancour	Anne-Marie Tanguay	F		organic farmer	1,479	2.97	5th	Tanguay has a degree in bio-agricultural sciences from the Université Laval, has worked as an agronomist, and as of 2011 was co-owner of an organic farm in Bécancour.
Beauce	Etienne Doyon Lessard				852			
Beauharnois—Salaberry	Rémi Pelletier				1,003			
Beauport—Limoilou	Louise Courville	F			950			
Berthier—Maskinongé	Léonie Matteau				1,193			
Bourassa	Tiziana Centazzo				613			
Brome—Missisquoi	Benoit Lambert	M			1,120			
Brossard—La Prairie	Kevin Murphy	M			900			
Chambly—Borduas	Nicholas Lescarbeau	M			1,072			
Charlesbourg—Haute-Saint-Charles	Simon Verret	M			832			
Châteauguay—Saint-Constant	Clara Kwan	F			923			
Chicoutimi—Le Fjord	Charles-Olivier Bolduc-Tremblay	M			780			
Compton—Stanstead	Gary Caldwell	M			1,241			
Drummond	Robin Fortin	F			987			
Gaspésie—Îles-de-la-Madeleine	Julien Leblanc	M			913			
Gatineau	Jonathan Meijer	M	Gatineau	Computer Engineer	639			
Haute-Gaspésie—La Mitis—Matane—Matapédia	Louis Drainville	M	Saint-Joseph-de-Lepage	Veterinary technician, biologist and agronomist	707			
Hochelaga	Yaneisy Delgado-Dihigo	F			798			
Honoré-Mercier	Gaetan Bérard	M	Montreal	Administrator	775			2008 Candidate in this riding
Hull—Aylmer	Roger Fleury	M	Gatineau	Retired Teacher	1,125			
Jeanne-Le Ber	Richard Noël	M	Montreal (Verdun)	Information security specialist	1,377			
Joliette	Annie Durette	F	Sainte-Mélanie	Artist	2,227			2008 candidate in this riding.
Jonquière—Alma	France Bergeron	F			652			
Lac-Saint-Louis	Bruno Tremblay	M	Pointe-Claire		2,315			
La Pointe-de-l'Île	David J. Cox	M			898			
LaSalle—Émard	Lorraine Banville	F			946			
Laurentides—Labelle	François Beauchamp	M			1,423			
Laurier—Sainte-Marie	Olivier Adam	M	Montreal	Multimedia Producer	1,324			Two-time Green Candidate in Chambly—Borduas (2006 and 2008
Laval	Jocelyne Leduc	F			1,260			
Laval—Les Îles	Brent Neil	M	Pointe-Claire	Fish room staff	966			2008 candidate in this riding
Lévis—Bellechasse	Sacha Dougé	F			903			
Longueuil—Pierre-Boucher	Valerie St-Amant	F						
Lotbinière—Chutes-de-la-Chaudière	Richard Domm	M						
Louis-Hébert	Michelle Fontaine							
Louis-Saint-Laurent	Jean Cloutier	M						
Manicouagan	Jacques Gélineau	M						
Marc-Aurèle-Fortin	Charles Sicotte	M						
Mégantic—L'Érable	Wyatt Tessari							
Montcalm	Marianne Girard	F						
Montmagny—L'Islet—Kamouraska—Rivière-du-Loup	Lynette Tremblay							
Montmorency—Charlevoix—Haute-Côte-Nord	François Bédard							
Mount Royal	Brian Sarwer-Foner	M						
Notre-Dame-de-Grâce—Lachine	Jessica Gal	F						
Outremont	François Pilon	M		Entrepreneur	838	2.16	5th	Pilon was born in 1956 in Montreal. In 1999, the Montreal Gazette wrote a profile piece on his business as a clothesline installer. He has been a Green Party candidate in Outremont in four federal elections: in 2006, in a 2007 by-election won by Thomas Mulcair, in 2008, and in 2011. During the 2008 election, he appeared on the ballot as "F. Monsieur Corde à Linge Pilon" (which translates as "F. Mr. Clothesline Pilon"). He is not to be confused with a different François Pilon who was elected as a New Democratic Party Member of Parliament in 2011.
Papineau	Danny Polifroni	M						
Pierrefonds—Dollard	Jonathan Lumer	M						
Pontiac	Louis-Phillippe Mayrand	M						
Portneuf—Jacques-Cartier	Claudine Delorme	F						
Québec	Yvan Dutil							
Repentigny	Michel Duchaine	M						
Richmond—Arthabaska	Tomy Bombardier	M						
Rimouski-Neigette—Témiscouata—Les Basques	Clément Pelletier	M						
Rivière-des-Mille-Îles	Gilles Bisson	M						
Rivière-du-Nord	Rene Piché	M						
Roberval—Lac-Saint-Jean	Steeve Simard							
Rosemont—La Petite-Patrie	Sameer Muldeen	M		Administrator	899	1.67	5th	Muldeen later ran as a Green Party of Quebec candidate in the 2012 Quebec provincial election.
Saint-Bruno—Saint-Hubert	Germain Denoncourt	M						
Saint-Hyacinthe—Bagot	Johany Beaudoin-Bussières	F						
Saint-Jean	Pierre Tremblay	M						
Saint-Lambert	Carmen Budilean	F						
Saint-Laurent—Cartierville	Tim Landry	M						
Saint-Léonard—Saint-Michel	Anna Valdes Di Salvo	F						
Saint-Maurice—Champlain	Pierre Cayou Audette	M	Clova	Electrician				Perennial Federal Candidate: (Marijuana Party candidate for Argenteuil—Papineau—Mirabel in 2000, Green Party Candidate in this riding in 2004 and 2006, and Green Party Candidate in Argenteuil—Papineau—Mirabel in 2008
Shefford	Patrick Daoust							
Sherbrooke	Jacques Laberge	M						
Terrebonne—Blainville	Michel Paulette	M						
Trois-Rivières	Louis Lacroix	M	Victoriaville	Agricultural Technician				Green Party Candidate in 2004 (in Drummond) and 2006 Canadian federal election (in Bas-Richelieu—Nicolet—Bécancour)
Vaudreuil—Soulanges	Jean-Yves Massenet	M						
Verchères—Les Patriotes	Thomas La Pierre	M						
Westmount—Ville-Marie	Andrew Carkner	M						

== Ontario - 106 seats ==
Riding	Candidate	Gender	Residence	Occupation	Votes	%	Rank	Biographical notes
Ajax—Pickering	Mike Harilaid	M						
Algoma—Manitoulin—Kapuskasing	Lorraine Rekmans	F						
Ancaster—Dundas—Flamborough—Westdale	Peter Ormond	M						
Barrie	Erich Jacoby-Hawkins	M	Barrie	Teacher				2004, 2006 and 2008 candidate in this riding.
Beaches—East York	Aaron Cameron	M						
Bramalea—Gore—Malton	John Moulton							
Brampton—Springdale	Mark Hoffberg	M	Brampton	Graphic Designer				
Brampton West	Avtaar Soor							
Brant	Nora Fueten	F	St. George	Retired				2008 candidate in this riding
Bruce—Grey—Owen Sound	Emma Hogbin	F	Owen Sound	Technical writer, Consultant				
Burlington	Graham Mayberry	M						
Cambridge	Jacques Malette							
Carleton—Mississippi Mills	John Hogg							
Chatham-Kent—Essex	Robert Hodgson							
Davenport	Wayne Scott							
Don Valley East	Akil Sadikali							
Don Valley West	Georgina Wilcock	F	Toronto	Medical Doctor				2008 candidate in this riding.
Dufferin—Caledon	Andrew Van Leeuwen	M	Caledon	Business Owner				2008 candidate in this riding.
Durham	Stephen Leahy	M	Durham	Environmental Journalist				2008 candidate in Durham.
Eglinton—Lawrence	Paul Baker							
Elgin—Middlesex—London	John Fisher							
Essex	Cora Carriveau							
Etobicoke Centre	Katarina Zoricic							
Etobicoke—Lakeshore	David Corail							
Etobicoke North								
Glengarry—Prescott—Russell	Sylvie Lemieux	F	Cumberland	Program Manager				2008 candidate in this riding.
Guelph	John Lawson	M	Guelph	Minister				
Haldimand—Norfolk	Anne Faulkner	F	Simcoe	Teacher				
Haliburton—Kawartha Lakes—Brock	Susanne E. Lauten	F	Newmarket	Vanessa Long	F			
Halton	Judi Remigio	F						
Hamilton Centre	No Candidate							
Hamilton East—Stoney Creek	Dave Hart Dyke							
Hamilton Mountain	Stephen E. Brotherston	M	Hamilton	Retired				2008 candidate in this riding.
Huron—Bruce	Eric Shelley	M	Tiverton))	Student				
Kenora	Mike Schwindt							
Kingston and the Islands	Eric Benoit Walton	M	Kingston	Business person				2006 and 2008 candidate in this riding.
Kitchener Centre	John Bithell	M	Kitchener	Manager				2008 candidate in this riding.
Kitchener—Conestoga	Albert Ashley							
Kitchener—Waterloo	Cathy MacLellan	F	Waterloo	Entrepreneure				2008 candidate in this riding.
Lambton—Kent—Middlesex	Jim Johnston							
Lanark—Frontenac—Lennox and Addington	Jennifer Wheeler	F		Naturopathic Doctor				
Leeds—Grenville	Mary Slade	F	Athens	Retired				
London—Fanshawe	Matthew Peloza	M		Certified Managerial Accountant				
London North Centre	Mary Ann Hodge							
London West	Brad Corbett							
Markham—Unionville	Adam Poon							
Mississauga—Brampton South	Benjamin Stone							
Mississauga East—Cooksville	Jaymini Bhikha	F	Mississauga					2008 candidate in this riding
Mississauga—Erindale	John Fraser							
Mississauga South	Paul Simas							
Mississauga—Streetsville	Chris Hill							
Nepean—Carleton	Jean-Luc Cooke	M						
Newmarket—Aurora	Vanessa Long							
Niagara Falls	Shawn Willick							
Niagara West—Glanbrook	Sid Frere	M	St. Anns	Principal (retired)				2008 candidate in this riding.
Nickel Belt	Christine Guillot							
Nipissing—Timiskaming	Scott Daley							
Northumberland—Quinte West	Stan Grizzle	M	Brighton	Actor				Son of the first black candidate for the CCF
Oak Ridges—Markham	Trifon Haitas							
Oakville	Andrew Chlobowski							
Oshawa	Gail Bates	F	Oshawa	Nurse				
Ottawa Centre	Jennifer Hunter	F	Ottawa	Facilitator				2008 candidate in this riding
Ottawa—Orléans	Paul Maillet	M	Ottawa	Org. Ethics Consultant				2008 candidate in the riding.
Ottawa South	Mick Kitor							
Ottawa—Vanier	Caroline Rioux	F	Ottawa	Software Designer				
Ottawa West—Nepean	Mark Mackenzie							
Oxford	Mike Farlow							
Parkdale—High Park	Sarah Newton							
Parry Sound-Muskoka	Glen Hodgson							
Perth Wellington	John Cowling							
Peterborough	Michael Bell							
Pickering—Scarborough East	Kevin Smith							
Prince Edward—Hastings	Patrick Larkin							
Renfrew—Nipissing—Pembroke	Rosanne Van Schie							
Richmond Hill	Cameron Hastings							
St. Catharines	Jennifer Mooradian	F	St. Catharines	Midwife				2008 candidate in Welland
St. Paul's	Debborah Donnelly	F	Toronto	Civil Servant				
Sarnia—Lambton	Timothy van Bodegom							
Sault Ste. Marie	Luke Macmichael							
Scarborough—Agincourt	Pauline Thompson							
Scarborough Centre	Ella Ng							
Scarborough-Guildwood	Alonzo Bartley							
Scarborough—Rouge River	George Singh							
Scarborough Southwest	Stefan Dixon							
Simcoe—Grey	Stuart Starbuck	M	Tottenham	Town Councilman and President of Provincial Green Party Constituency in Simcoe—Grey				
Simcoe North	Valerie Powell	F	Coldwater	Psychogeriatric Consultant				2008 candidate in this riding.
Stormont—Dundas—South Glengarry	David Anthony Rawnsley	M	Williamstown	Retired				2008 candidate in this riding.
Sudbury	Frederick Twilley	M	Sudbury	Retired				2008 Candidate in Nickel Belt
Thornhill	Norbert Koehl							
Thunder Bay—Rainy River	Ed Shields							
Thunder Bay—Superior North	Scot Kyle							
Timmins-James Bay	Lisa Bennett							
Toronto Centre	Ellen Michelson	F	Toronto	Educator, Writer				Peace and Security Critic for the Green Party of Canada; 2008 candidate in this riding.
Toronto—Danforth	Adriana Mugnatto-Hamu	F	Toronto	Environmental Organizer				Climate Change Critic for the Green Party of Canada
Trinity—Spadina	Stephen LaFrenie	M	Toronto	Arts Educator				2008 candidate in this riding.
Vaughan	Claudia Rodriguez-Larrain	F	Vaughan	CEO and President of Environmental NGO				2010 by-election candidate in this riding. Ontario New Democratic Party in York Centre during the 2007 Ontario general election.
Welland	Robin Williamson							
Wellington—Halton Hills	Brent Bouteiller							
Whitby—Oshawa	Rebecca Harrison	F	Whitby					S-W Ontario GPC Organizer
Willowdale								
Windsor—Tecumseh	Kyle Prestanski							
Windsor West	Alishia Fox							
York Centre	Rosemary Frei							
York—Simcoe	John Dewar							
York South—Weston	Sonny Day							
York West	Unblind Tibbin							

== Manitoba - 14 Seats ==
Riding	Candidate	Gender	Residence	Occupation	Votes	%	Rank	Biographical notes
Brandon—Souris	Dave Barnes	M						
Charleswood—St. James—Assiniboia	Denali Enns	F						
Churchill	Alberteen Spence	F						
Dauphin—Swan River—Marquette	Kate Storey	F	Grandview	Farmer				2006 and 2008 candidate in this riding.
Elmwood—Transcona	Ellen Young	F						
Kildonan—St. Paul	Alon Weinberg	M						
Portage—Lisgar	Matthew Friesen	M						
Provencher	Janine Gibson	F						
Saint Boniface	Marc Payette	M						
Selkirk—Interlake	Don Winstone	M						
Winnipeg Centre	Jacqueline Romanow	F	Winnipeg	Professor				
Winnipeg North	John Harvie	M						
Winnipeg South	Caitlin McIntyre	F						
Winnipeg South Centre	Joshua McNeil	M						

== Saskatchewan - 14 seats ==
Riding	Candidate	Gender	Residence	Occupation	Votes	%	Rank	Biographical notes
Battlefords—Lloydminster	Norbert Kratchmer	M						
Blackstrap	Shawn Setyo	M						
Cypress Hills—Grasslands	Chris Carnell	M	Frontier	IT manager				
Desnethé—Missinippi—Churchill River	George Morin	M						
Palliser	Larissa Shasko	F						
Prince Albert	Myk Brazier	M						
Regina—Lumsden—Lake Centre	Billy Patterson	M						
Regina—Qu'Appelle	Gregory E. Chatterson	M	Fort Qu'Appelle	Bricklayer				1997 Canadian Action Party candidate in this riding; 2008 Green candidate in this riding.
Saskatoon—Humboldt	Sandra Finley	F						
Saskatoon—Rosetown—Biggar	Vicki Strelioff	F						
Saskatoon—Wanuskewin	Mark Bigland-Pritchard	M						
Souris—Moose Mountain	Bob Deptuck	M						
Wascana	Bill Clary	M						
Yorkton—Melville	Elaine Hughes	F						

== Alberta - 28 seats ==
Riding	Candidate's Name	Gender	Residence	Occupation	Votes	%	Rank	Notes
Calgary Centre	William Hamilton	M						
Calgary Centre-North	Heather MacIntosh	F	Calgary					
Calgary East	Scott Milton	M	Calgary					
Calgary Northeast	Sheila Brown-Eckersley	F						
Calgary—Nose Hill	Tony Hajj	M						
Calgary Southeast	Brett Spencer	M						
Calgary Southwest	Kelly Christie	M						2008 candidate in this riding
Calgary West	Anna Wagner	F	Calgary					
Crowfoot	Konrad Schellenberg	M	Camrose					
Edmonton Centre	David Parker	M	Edmonton					
Edmonton East	Trey Capnerhurst	F						2008 candidate in this riding
Edmonton—Leduc	Valerie Kennedy	F						2008 candidate in this riding
Edmonton—Mill Woods—Beaumont	Paul Boos	M						
Edmonton—St. Albert	Peter Johnston	M						
Edmonton—Sherwood Park	Chris Vallee	M		Electrician				
Edmonton—Spruce Grove	Eric Skonberg	M						
Edmonton—Strathcona	Andrew Fehr	M						
Fort McMurray—Athabasca	Jule Asterisk	F	Slave Lake					
Lethbridge	Cailin Bartlett							
Macleod	Attila Nagy	M						
Medicine Hat	Graham Murray	M	Medicine Hat					
Peace River	Wayne Kamieniecki	M						
Red Deer	Ashkan Hamzehi	M	Red Deer					
Vegreville—Wainwright	Will Munsey	M		Farmer				
Westlock—St. Paul	Lisa Grant							
Wetaskiwin	Les Parsons	M						
Wild Rose	Mike MacDonald	M						
Yellowhead	Monika Schaefer	F	Jasper					

== British Columbia - 36 seats ==
Riding	Candidate	Gender	Residence	Occupation	Votes	%	Rank	Biographical notes
Abbotsford	Daniel Bryce	M						
British Columbia Southern Interior	Bryan Hunt							
Burnaby—Douglas	Adrianne Merlo	F						
Burnaby—New Westminster	Carrie-Ann McLaren	F						
Cariboo—Prince George	Heidi Redl	F		Cattle Rancher				
Chilliwack—Fraser Canyon	Jamie Hoskins	M	Chilliwack					
Delta—Richmond East	Duane Laird	M						
Esquimalt—Juan de Fuca	Shaunna Salsman	F	Sooke					
Fleetwood—Port Kells	Alan Saldanha	M						
Kamloops—Thompson—Cariboo	Donovan Michael Grube Cavers	M						
Kelowna—Lake Country	Alice Hooper	F						
Kootenay—Columbia	William Green							
Langley	Carey Poitras	F						
Nanaimo—Alberni	Myron Jespersen	M						
Nanaimo—Cowichan	Anne Marie Benoit	F						
Newton—North Delta	Liz Walker	F						
New Westminster—Coquitlam	Rebecca Helps	F						
North Vancouver	Greg Dowman	M						
Okanagan—Coquihalla	Dan Bouchard	M						
Okanagan—Shuswap	Greig Crockett	M						
Pitt Meadows—Maple Ridge—Mission	Peter Tam	M	Maple Ridge					
Port Moody—Westwood—Port Coquitlam	Kevin Kim	M						
Prince George—Peace River	Hilary Crowley	F	Summit Lake	Physiotherapist				
Richmond	Michael Wolfe	M		Teacher				
Saanich—Gulf Islands	Elizabeth May	F	Sidney	Leader of Political Party				2008 Green Party Candidate in Central Nova, Current Leader of the Green Party of Canada
Skeena—Bulkley Valley	Roger Benham	M						
South Surrey—White Rock—Cloverdale	Larry Colero	M						
Surrey North	Bernadette Keenan							
Vancouver Centre	Adriane Carr	F	Vancouver	Political Organizer				2008 Candidate in this riding; former leader of the Green Party of British Columbia
Vancouver East	Douglas Roy	M						
Vancouver Island North	Sue Moen	F						
Vancouver Kingsway	Louise Boutin							
Vancouver Quadra	Laura-Leah Shaw	F						
Vancouver South	Jean Hakizimana	M						
Victoria	Jared Giesbrecht	M	Victoria					
West Vancouver—Sunshine Coast—Sea to Sky Country	Brennan Wauters	M						

== Yukon - 1 seat ==
Riding	Candidate	Gender	Residence	Occupation	Votes	%	Rank	Biographical notes
Yukon	John Streicker	M	Marsh Lake	Professional Engineer				Green Party Candidate in 2008.

== Northwest Territories - 1 seat ==
Riding	Candidate's Name	Gender	Residence	Occupation	Votes	%	Rank	Notes
Western Arctic	Eli Purchase	M	Yellowknife					

== Nunavut - 1 seat ==
Riding	Candidate's Name	Gender	Residence	Occupation	Votes	%	Rank	Notes
Nunavut	Paul Azzarello	M		Real estate agent				

== See also ==
- Results of the Canadian federal election, 2008
- Results by riding for the Canadian federal election, 2008
