= Bloc Québécois candidates in the 2011 Canadian federal election =

List of nominated candidates for Bloc Québécois in 2011

This is a list of nominated candidates for the Bloc Québécois in the 2011 Canadian federal election. The Bloc Québécois nominated candidates in all 75 Quebec ridings.

== Candidates ==
Riding	Candidate's Name	Gender	Residence	Occupation	Votes	%	Rank	Notes
Abitibi—Baie-James—Nunavik—Eeyou	Yvon Lévesque	M						
Abitibi—Témiscamingue	Marc Lemay	M	Rouyn-Noranda	Lawyer				Current Member of Parliament
Ahuntsic	Maria Mourani	F	Blainville	Parliamentarian				Current Member of Parliament
Alfred-Pellan	Robert Carrier	M	Laval	Engineer				Current Member of Parliament
Argenteuil—Papineau—Mirabel	Mario Laframboise	M	Notre-Dame-de-la-Paix	Parliamentarian				Current Member of Parliament
Bas-Richelieu—Nicolet—Bécancour	Louis Plamondon	M						
Beauce	Sylvio Morin	M						
Beauharnois—Salaberry	Claude DeBellefeuille	F	Ormstown	Parliamentarian				Current Member of Parliament
Beauport—Limoilou	Michel Létourneau	M						
Berthier—Maskinongé	Guy André	M	Trois-Rivières	Parliamentarian				Current Member of Parliament
Bourassa	Daniel Mailhot	M	Montreal	Director-assistant CSDM school				2008 candidate in this riding.
Brome—Missisquoi	Christelle Bogosta	F						2008 NDP candidate in this riding
Brossard—La Prairie	Marcel Lussier	M						
Chambly—Borduas	Yves Lessard	M	Saint-Basile-le-Grand	Labour relations councillor				Current Member of Parliament
Charlesbourg—Haute-Saint-Charles	Félix Grenier	M						
Châteauguay—Saint-Constant	Carole Freeman	F						
Chicoutimi—Le Fjord	Robert Bouchard	M						
Compton—Stanstead	France Bonsant	F	Sherbrooke	Parliamentarian				Incumbent MP
Drummond	Roger Pomerleau	M	Lefebvre	Parliamentarian				Incumbent MP
Gaspésie—Îles-de-la-Madeleine	Daniel Côté	M		Lawyer				
Gatineau	Richard Nadeau	M						
Haute-Gaspésie—La Mitis—Matane—Matapédia	Jean-François Fortin	M	Sainte-Flavie	Mayor				Current mayor of Sainte-Flavie.
Hochelaga	Daniel Paillé	M						
Honoré-Mercier	Martin Laroche	M		Actor				
Hull—Aylmer	Dino Lemay	M						
Jeanne-Le Ber	Thierry St-Cyr	M						
Joliette	Pierre Paquette	M	Saint-Alphonse-Rodriguez	Economist				Incumbent MP and BQ House Leader
Jonquière—Alma	Pierre Forest	M	Jonquière					
La Pointe-de-l'Île	Ginette Beaudry	F						
Lac-Saint-Louis	Éric Taillefer	M						
LaSalle—Émard	Carl Dubois	M						
Laurentides—Labelle	Johanne Deschamps	F	Mont-Laurier	Parliamentarian				Current Member of Parliament
Laurier—Sainte-Marie	Gilles Duceppe	M	Montreal					BQ Party Leader and Incumbent MP
Laval	Nicole Demers	F	Laval					
Laval—Les Îles	Mohamedali Jetha	M	Laval	Machinist				2008 Candidate in this riding.
Lévis—Bellechasse	Danielle-Maude Gosselin	F	Lévis					
Longueuil—Pierre-Boucher	Jean Dorion	M						
Lotbinière—Chutes-de-la-Chaudière	Gaston Gourde	M						
Louis-Hébert	Pascal-Pierre Paillé	M	Quebec City	Teacher				Current Member of Parliament
Louis-Saint-Laurent	France Gagné	M	Quebec City	Administration technician				2008 Candidate in this riding.
Manicouagan	Gérard Asselin	M	Baie-Comeau	Parliamentarian				Current Member of Parliament
Marc-Aurèle-Fortin	Marie-France Charbonneau	F						
Mégantic—L'Érable	Pierre Turcotte	M		Notary				2008 Candidate in this riding
Montcalm	Roger Gaudet	M	Saint-Liguori	Parliamentarian				Current Member of Parliament
Montmagny—L'Islet—Kamouraska—Rivière-du-Loup	Nathalie Arsenault	F						
Montmorency—Charlevoix—Haute-Côte-Nord	Michel Guimond	M	Boischatel	Parliamentarian				Current Member of Parliament
Mount Royal	Gabriel Dumais	M						
Notre-Dame-de-Grâce—Lachine	Gabrielle Ladouceur-Despins	F						
Outremont	Élise Daoust	F						
Papineau	Vivian Barbot	F						
Pierrefonds—Dollard	Nicolas Jolicoeur	M						
Pontiac	Maude Tremblay	F						
Portneuf—Jacques-Cartier	Richard Côté	M	Neuville	Director, Strategic Council				2008 Candidate in this riding.
Québec	Christiane Gagnon	F						
Repentigny	Nicolas Dufour	M	Repentigny	Student				Current Member of Parliament, and baby of the house
Richmond—Arthabaska	André Bellavance	M	Victoriaville	Parliamentarian				Incumbent MP
Rimouski-Neigette—Témiscouata—Les Basques	Claude Guimond	M	Rimouski	Farmer				Current Member of Parliament
Rivière-des-Mille-Îles	Luc Desnoyers	M						
Rivière-du-Nord	Monique Guay	F	Prévost	Parliamentarian				Current Member of Parliament
Roberval—Lac-Saint-Jean	Claude Pilote	M						
Rosemont—La Petite-Patrie	Bernard Bigras	M	Montreal	Parliamentarian				Current Member of Parliament
Saint-Bruno—Saint-Hubert	Carole Lavallée	F	Longueuil	Communication councillor				Current Member of Parliament
Saint-Hyacinthe—Bagot	Ève-Mary Thaï Thi Lac	F	Saint-Hyacinthe	Parliamentarian				Current Member of Parliament
Saint-Jean	Claude Bachand	M	Saint-Jean-sur-Richelieu	Parliamentarian				Current Member of Parliament
Saint-Lambert	Josée Beaudin	F						
Saint-Laurent—Cartierville	William Fayad	M						
Saint-Léonard—Saint-Michel	Alain Bernier	M		Social Worker				
Saint-Maurice—Champlain	Jean-Yves Laforest	M	Shawinigan	Physical Educator				Current Member of Parliament
Shefford	Robert Vincent	M	Granby	Parliamentarian				Current Member of Parliament
Sherbrooke	Serge Cardin	M						
Terrebonne—Blainville	Diane Bourgeois	F	Terrebonne	Parliamentarian				Current Member of Parliament
Trois-Rivières	Paule Brunelle	F						
Vaudreuil—Soulanges	Meili Faille	F						
Verchères—Les Patriotes	Luc Malo	M	Contrecoeur	Parliamentarian				Current Member of Parliament
Westmount—Ville-Marie	Véronique Roy	F						

== See also ==
- Results of the Canadian federal election, 2008
- Results by riding for the Canadian federal election, 2008
