= Independent candidates in the 2008 Canadian federal election =

Seventy-one independent and non-affiliated candidates contested the 2008 Canadian federal election in different ridings across the country. Of these, two were elected: André Arthur in Portneuf—Jacques-Cartier, Quebec, and Bill Casey in Cumberland—Colchester—Musquodoboit Valley, Nova Scotia. Both had parliamentary experience: Arthur was first elected in 2006 as an independent, while Casey had served as a Progressive Conservative and Conservative Member of Parliament (MP) for many years before leaving the party due to policy differences.

== Candidates ==
=== Quebec (incomplete) ===
Riding	Candidate's Name	Gender	Residence	Occupation	Votes	%	Rank	Notes
Brome—Missisquoi	David Marler	M		Lawyer	354	0.71	6th	Marler contested the 2006 federal election as a Conservative before leaving the party over the "In and Out" funding scandal.

=== Ontario (incomplete) ===
Riding	Candidate's Name	Gender	Residence	Occupation	Votes	%	Rank	Notes
Renfrew—Nipissing—Pembroke	Denis Gagné	M		Farmer	293	0.62	5th	Gagné supported a guaranteed annual income and toll roads.
