= Liberal Party of Canada candidates in the 2011 Canadian federal election =

This is a list of nominated candidates for the Liberal Party of Canada in the federal election held May 2, 2011.

== Newfoundland and Labrador — 7 seats ==
Riding	Candidate's Name	Notes	Gender	Residence	Occupation	Votes	%	Rank
Avalon	Scott Andrews	incumbent MP	M	Conception Bay South		16,021	43.86%	1
Bonavista—Gander—Grand Falls—Windsor	Scott Simms	incumbent MP	M	Bishop's Falls		17,895	57.80%	1
Humber—St. Barbe—Baie Verte	Gerry Byrne	incumbent MP	M	Corner Brook		17,119	57.11%	1
Labrador	Todd Russell	incumbent MP	M	Happy Valley-Goose Bay		4,003	38.23%	2
Random—Burin—St. George's	Judy Foote	incumbent MP	F	St. John's		12,914	49.65%	1
St. John's East	John Allan	Nominated March 25, 2011	M	St. John's		3,019	6.85%	3
St. John's South—Mount Pearl	Siobhán Coady	incumbent MP	F	St. John's		11,131	28.65%	2

== Prince Edward Island — 4 seats ==
Riding	Candidate's Name	Notes	Gender	Residence	Occupation	Votes	%	Rank
Cardigan	Lawrence MacAulay	incumbent MP	M			10,484	49.61%	
Charlottetown	Sean Casey		M		Lawyer	7,292	39.48%	
Egmont	Guy Gallant		M	Wellington		5,998	31.31%	
Malpeque	Wayne Easter	incumbent MP	M			8,605	42.40%	

== Nova Scotia — 11 seats ==
Riding	Candidate's Name	Notes	Gender	Residence	Occupation	Votes	%	Rank
Cape Breton—Canso	Rodger Cuzner	incumbent MP	M	Glace Bay		16,478	46.41%	
Central Nova	John Hamilton		M	Antigonish	Family doctor	5,619	14.79%	
Cumberland—Colchester—Musquodoboit Valley	Jim Burrows	Liberal Candidate in 2009 by-election	M	Green Oaks	Dairy Farmer	7,207	17.98%	
Dartmouth—Cole Harbour	Michael Savage	incumbent MP	M	Dartmouth		15,162	35.10%	
Halifax	Stan Kutcher	Defeated Chris Crowell for the nomination	M	Halifax	Doctor and Adolescent Mental Health Researcher	11,791	25.64%	
Halifax West	Geoff Regan	incumbent MP	M	Bedford		16,230	35.92%	
Kings—Hants	Scott Brison	incumbent MP	M	Cheverie		15,887	39.56%	
Sackville—Eastern Shore	Scott Hemming		M	Lower Sackville	Consultant	4,676	11.25%	
South Shore—St. Margaret's	Derek Wells	Former MP	M	Chester	Lawyer	7,014	16.85%	
Sydney—Victoria	Mark Eyking	incumbent MP	M	Millville		14,805	40.13%	
West Nova	Robert Thibault	former MP	M	Concession	Municipal administrator	15,712	36.51%	

== New Brunswick — 10 seats ==
Riding	Candidate's Name	Notes	Gender	Residence	Occupation	Votes	%	Rank
Acadie—Bathurst	Jean Marie Gionet					6,491	14.12%	
Beauséjour	Dominic LeBlanc	incumbent MP	M			17,399	39.08%	
Fredericton	Randy McKeen		M	Fredericton	Radio Announcer for Astral Media	10,292	23.23%	
Fundy Royal	Dave Delaney		M	Quispamsis	Director of Operations for Habitat for Humanity	3,683	10.05%	
Madawaska—Restigouche	Jean-Claude D'Amours	incumbent MP	M			12,309	35.22%	
Miramichi	Keith Vickers		M			6,804	22.11%	
Moncton—Riverview—Dieppe	Brian Murphy	incumbent MP	M			15,244	32.65%	
New Brunswick Southwest	Kelly Wilson		F	Beaver Harbour		4,319	13.58%	
Saint John	Stephen Chase		M	Saint John		5,964	16.10%	
Tobique—Mactaquac	Charles Chiasson		M	Grand Falls		5,375	15.94%	

== Quebec — 75 seats ==
Riding	Candidate's Name	Notes	Gender	Residence	Occupation	Votes	%	Rank
Abitibi—Baie-James—Nunavik—Eeyou	Léandre Gervais		M		Engineer	3,282	10.51%	
Abitibi—Témiscamingue	Suzie Grenon		F			2,859		
Ahuntsic	Noushig Eloyan	Former Montreal city councillor.	F					
Alfred-Pellan	Angelo G. Iacono		M					
Argenteuil—Papineau—Mirabel	Daniel Fox		M		Chartered Accountant	7,135		
Bas-Richelieu—Nicolet—Bécancour	Rhéal Blais	According to his campaign literature, Blais was born in Saint-Boniface-de-Shawinigan and has a technical engineering degree from Purdue University in Indianapolis. A businessperson in the Sorel-Tracy area specializing in the thermal industry, he has also organized Canada Day celebrations in the region.	M		Industrialist	5,024	10.10	4/5
Beauce	Claude Morin	Former ADQ MNA.	M		Industrialist			
Beauharnois—Salaberry	François Deslandres		M		Promotional agent			
Beauport—Limoilou	Lorraine Chartier		F					
Berthier—Maskinongé	Francine Gaudet	Former MNA	F					
Bourassa	Denis Coderre	incumbent MP	M					
Brome—Missisquoi	Denis Paradis	Former Member of Parliament	M	Saint-Armand	Lawyer			
Brossard—La Prairie	Alexandra Mendès	Current Member of Parliament	F	Sainte-Catherine	Communications agent			
Chambly—Borduas	Bernard Delorme		M		University professor			
Charlesbourg—Haute-Saint-Charles	Martine Gaudreault		F					
Châteauguay—Saint-Constant	Linda Schwey		F					
Chicoutimi—Le Fjord	Marc Pettersen		M					
Compton—Stanstead	William Hogg	2008 Candidate in this riding.	M	Magog	Professor			
Drummond	Pierre Côté		M					
Gaspésie—Îles-de-la-Madeleine	Jules Duguay		M			6,292	17.09%	
Gatineau	Steve MacKinnon		M			7,975		
Haute-Gaspésie—La Mitis—Matane—Matapédia	Nancy Charest	2008 Candidate in this riding. Former MNA.	F	Matane	Lawyer			
Hochelaga	Gilbert Thibodeau		M	Montreal				
Honoré-Mercier	Pablo Rodriguez	incumbent MP	M					
Hull—Aylmer	Marcel Proulx	Current Member of Parliament	M	Gatineau	Parliamentarian	12,051		
Jeanne-Le Ber	Mark Bruneau		M		Businessman			
Joliette	Suzie St-Onge	2008 candidate in this riding	F	Saint-Alexis-des-Monts	Service director			
Jonquière—Alma	Bianka Villeneuve		F					
La Pointe-de-l'Île	Olivier Coulombe		M					
Lac-Saint-Louis	Francis Scarpaleggia	Current Member of Parliament	M	Kirkland	Parliamentarian			
LaSalle—Émard	Lise Zarac	Incumbent MP (Replaced Paul Martin in 2008)	F	LaSalle	Parliamentarian			
Laurentides—Labelle	Jean-Marc Lacoste		M		CEO of mining company	7,169		
Laurier—Sainte-Marie	Philippe Allard		M					
Laval	Eva Nassif	2008 Candidate in Terrebonne—Blainville	F	Laval	Translator			
Laval—Les Îles	Karine Joizil		F		Lawyer			
Lévis—Bellechasse	Francis Laforesterie		M		Sales executive			
Longueuil—Pierre-Boucher	Pierre Diamond	2008 candidate in Saint-Bruno—Saint-Hubert	M	Boucherville	Teacher			
Lotbinière—Chutes-de-la-Chaudière	Nicole Larouche	Levis Municipal councilor	F					
Louis-Hébert	Jean Beaupré		M					
Louis-Saint-Laurent	Johanne Brisson		F					
Manicouagan	André Forbes	Lost party support just before the nomination deadline and continued to run as an Independent	M					
Marc-Aurèle-Fortin	Eduardo Agurto		M		Businessman			
Mégantic—L'Érable	René Roy		M		Businessman and student			
Montcalm	Yves Dufour		M		Industrial manager			
Montmagny—L'Islet—Kamouraska—Rivière-du-Loup	Marcel Catellier	Former Mayor of Cap-Saint-Ignace, QC and Candidate in the November 9 by-election	M	Cap-Saint-Ignace				
Montmorency—Charlevoix—Haute-Côte-Nord	Robert Gauthier	Former mayor of Saint-Irénée	M		Retired policeman			
Mount Royal	Irwin Cotler	Current Member of Parliament	M	Côte Saint-Luc	Parliamentarian			
Notre-Dame-de-Grâce—Lachine	Marlene Jennings	Current Member of Parliament	F	Mount Royal	Parliamentarian and Lawyer			
Outremont	Martin Cauchon	Former Minister of Justice and former MP from Outremont (1993–2004)	M		Lawyer			
Papineau	Justin Trudeau	incumbent MP						
Pierrefonds—Dollard	Bernard Patry	incumbent MP	M					
Pontiac	Cindy Duncan McMillan	2008 candidate in this riding.	F	Wakefield	Farmer	6,242		
Portneuf—Jacques-Cartier	Réjean Thériault		M					
Québec	François Payeur		M		Diplomat			
Repentigny	Chantal Perreault		F		Lawyer			
Richmond—Arthabaska	Louis Bérubé		M					
Rimouski-Neigette—Témiscouata—Les Basques	Pierre Cadieux		M		Professor			
Rivière-des-Mille-Îles	Denis Joannette	2008 candidate in this riding.	M	Deux-Montagnes	Businessman	5,300		
Rivière-du-Nord	Martin Guindon		M	Saint-Jerome		3,400		
Roberval—Lac-Saint-Jean	Bernard Garneau		M		Director of sales			
Rosemont—La Petite-Patrie	Kettly Beauregard	Former municipal councillor	F		Businesswoman			
Saint-Bruno—Saint-Hubert	Michel Picard		M					
Saint-Hyacinthe—Bagot	Denis Vallée		M		Horse breeder			
Saint-Jean	Robert M. David		M					
Saint-Lambert	Roxane Jacqueline Stanners	2008 candidate in this riding.	F	Montreal	Lawyer			
Saint-Laurent—Cartierville	Stéphane Dion	incumbent MP	M		Parliamentarian			
Saint-Léonard—Saint-Michel	Massimo Pacetti	Current Member of Parliament	M	Saint-Léonard	Parliamentarian			
Saint-Maurice—Champlain	France Beaulieu		F					
Shefford	Bernard Demers	Demers (born 1953) has a Ph.D. in Psychology from the Université de Montréal (1979). He has been a professor, researcher, and academic administrator, and has been a Liberal candidate in two federal elections.	M	Béthanie	Psychologist	4,855	8.99	4/5
Sherbrooke	Éric Deslauriers-Joannette		M		Administrative coordinator			
Terrebonne—Blainville	Robert Frégeau		M	Boisbriand		4,893		
Trois-Rivières	Patrice Mangin		M		General manager			
Vaudreuil—Soulanges	Lyne Pelchat		F					
Verchères—Les Patriotes	Pier-Luc Therrien-Péloquin		M		Student			
Westmount—Ville-Marie	Marc Garneau	incumbent MP and the first Canadian astronaut	M	Westmount	Engineer			

== Ontario — 106 seats ==
Riding	Candidate's Name	Notes	Gender	Residence	Occupation	Votes	%	Rank
Ajax—Pickering	Mark Holland	incumbent MP						
Algoma—Manitoulin—Kapuskasing	François Cloutier		M	Moonbeam				
Ancaster—Dundas—Flamborough—Westdale	Dave Braden		M		City Councillor			
Barrie	Colin Wilson		M					
Beaches—East York	Maria Minna	incumbent MP						
Bramalea—Gore—Malton	Gurbax S. Malhi	incumbent MP	M					
Brampton—Springdale	Ruby Dhalla	incumbent MP						
Brampton West	Andrew Kania	incumbent MP						
Brant	Lloyd St. Amand	Former Member of Parliament	M	Brantford	Lawyer			
Bruce—Grey—Owen Sound	Kimberly Love		F	Southgate	Farmer			
Burlington	Alyssa Brierley		F	Burlington	Lawyer			
Cambridge	Bryan May		M					
Carleton—Mississippi Mills	Karen McCrimmon		F	West Carleton	CF Veteran, Retd LCol, Businesswoman			
Chatham-Kent—Essex	Steve Pickard	municipal councillor and son of former MP Jerry Pickard	M	Chatham	Municipal councillor			
Davenport	Mario Silva	incumbent MP						
Don Valley East	Yasmin Ratansi	incumbent MP						
Don Valley West	Rob Oliphant	incumbent MP						
Dufferin—Caledon	William Prout		M	Alton				
Durham	Grant Humes		M		Chief Operating Officer			
Eglinton—Lawrence	Joe Volpe	incumbent MP						
Elgin—Middlesex—London	Graham Warwick	Former Mayor of West Elgin	M					
Essex	Nelson Santos	Mayor of the Town of Kingsville	M	Kingsville	Mayor			
Etobicoke Centre	Borys Wrzesnewskyj	incumbent MP						
Etobicoke—Lakeshore	Michael Ignatieff	party leader & incumbent MP						
Etobicoke North	Kirsty Duncan	incumbent MP						
Glengarry—Prescott—Russell	Julie Bourgeois		F	Embrun	Lawyer			
Guelph	Frank Valeriote	incumbent MP						
Haldimand—Norfolk	Bob Speller	Former Member of Parliament and Cabinet Minister	M	Waterford	Retired Manager			
Haliburton—Kawartha Lakes—Brock	Laura Redman		F	Minden Hills	Managing Editor of The County Voice in Haliburton			
Halton	Connie Laurin-Bowe		F					
Hamilton Centre	Anne Tennier		F	Waterdown	Businesswoman			
Hamilton East—Stoney Creek	Michelle Stockwell		F		Mental Health Counsellor, Registered Nurse			
Hamilton Mountain	Marie Bountrogianni	MPP for Hamilton Mountain (1999-2007)	F					
Huron—Bruce	Charlie Bagnato	Mayor of Brockton	M	Walkerton	Mayor			
Kenora	Roger Valley	Former Member of Parliament	M	Dryden	Commercial Fisher			
Kingston and the Islands	Ted Hsu	Elliot, I(2011)Hsu a fit for Liberals, The Whig Standard (Accessed Jan 2011)	M	Kingston	Environmentalist, Businessman, Physicist			
Kitchener Centre	Karen Redman	Former Member of Parliament	F	Kitchener	Writer			
Kitchener—Conestoga	Bob Rosehart		F		Former President of Wilfrid Laurier and Lakehead Universities			
Kitchener—Waterloo	Andrew Telegdi	Former Member of Parliament	M	Waterloo	Executive director			
Lambton—Kent—Middlesex	Gayle Stucke		F		Retired School Board Director			
Lanark—Frontenac—Lennox and Addington	David Remington	2008 candidate in this riding.	M	Napanee	Program supervisor ministry of children & youth			
Leeds—Grenville	Marjory Loveys	former aide to Jean Chrétien; 2008 candidate in this riding.	F	Ottawa	Consultant			
London—Fanshawe	Roger Caranci		M		Municipal Councillor			
London North Centre	Glen Pearson	incumbent MP						
London West	Doug Ferguson	Former Liberal Party National President, son of Trudeau era minister Ralph Ferguson	M					
Markham—Unionville	John McCallum	incumbent MP						
Mississauga—Brampton South	Navdeep Bains	incumbent MP	M					
Mississauga East—Cooksville	Peter Fonseca	Ontario Cabinet Minister	M					
Mississauga—Erindale	Omar Alghabra	Former Member of Parliament	M	Mississauga	Engineer			
Mississauga South	Paul Szabo	incumbent MP	M					
Mississauga—Streetsville	Bonnie Crombie	incumbent MP	F					
Nepean—Carleton	Ryan Keon	Son of Conservative Senator and Heart Surgeon Wilbert Keon, graduate of Howard U. Law School (Washington, D.C.)	M	Manotick	Lawyer			
Newmarket—Aurora	Kyle Peterson		M					
Niagara Falls	Bev Hodgson		F	Niagara Falls	Lawyer			
Niagara West—Glanbrook	Stephen Bieda							
Nickel Belt	Joe Cormier		M	Sturgeon Falls	Former president of Joco Communications.			
Nipissing—Timiskaming	Anthony Rota	incumbent MP						
Northumberland—Quinte West	Kim Rudd	Former Chamber of Commerce president	F	Cobourg	Businesswoman			
Oak Ridges—Markham	Lui Temelkovski	Former Member of Parliament	M	Markham	Businessman			
Oakville	Max Khan	Oakville Town Councillor for Ward 6	M	Oakville	Lawyer			
Oshawa	James C. Morton	Past President of Ontario Bar Association	M		Lawyer			
Ottawa Centre	Scott Bradley	lobbyist, former political staff	M		Lobbyist			
Ottawa—Orléans	David Bertschi		M	Ottawa-Orleans	Lawyer			
Ottawa South	David McGuinty	incumbent MP & brother of Ontario Premier Dalton McGuinty						
Ottawa—Vanier	Mauril Bélanger	incumbent MP						
Ottawa West—Nepean	Anita Vandenbeld		F					
Oxford	Tim Lobzun							
Parkdale—High Park	Gerard Kennedy	incumbent MP, former Ontario MPP & Minister of Education.						
Parry Sound-Muskoka	Cindy Waters		M	Huntsville	Bookkeeper			
Perth Wellington	Bob McTavish		M		former mayor			
Peterborough	Elizabeth McGregor	2008 candidate in this riding		Lakefield	Guest Lecturer			
Pickering—Scarborough East	Dan McTeague	incumbent MP	M	Oakville				
Prince Edward—Hastings	Peter Tinsley	Former Chair of the Military Police Complaints Commission	M		Military lawyer			
Renfrew—Nipissing—Pembroke	Christine Tabbert		F		Lawyer			
Richmond Hill	Bryon Wilfert	incumbent MP						
St. Catharines	Andrew Gill	St. Catharines City Councilor for St. Andrew's Ward.	M	St. Catharines	Captain of the Niagara Falls Fire Department			
St. Paul's	Carolyn Bennett	incumbent MP & Former Cabinet minister and liberal leadership candidate.						
Sarnia—Lambton	Tim Fugard	2008 Candidate in the same riding	M	Petrolia	Controller			
Sault Ste. Marie	Christian Provenzano	2006 candidate in this riding. Former chief of staff to Michael Ignatieff	M	Sault Ste. Marie	Lawyer			
Scarborough—Agincourt	Jim Karygiannis	incumbent MP						
Scarborough Centre	John Cannis	incumbent MP						
Scarborough-Guildwood	John McKay	incumbent MP						
Scarborough—Rouge River	Rana Sarkar		M					
Scarborough Southwest	Michelle Simson	incumbent MP						
Simcoe—Grey	Alex Smardenka		M		Businessman			
Simcoe North	Steve Clarke	2008 Candidate in this riding.	M					
Stormont—Dundas—South Glengarry	Bernadette Clement	Cornwall city councillor, legal aid lawyer	F	Cornwall	City councillor			
Sudbury	Carol Hartman	lawyer, Law Society of Upper Canada Bencher	F	Sudbury	Lawyer			
Thornhill	Karen Mock	psychologist, former executive director of the Canadian Race Relations Foundation, former national director of the League for Human Rights of B'nai B'rith Canada	F		Psychologist			
Thunder Bay—Rainy River	Ken Boshcoff	Former Member of Parliament and Thunder Bay mayor	M	Thunder Bay	Insurance Advisor			
Thunder Bay—Superior North	Yves Fricot		M		forestry executive			
Timmins-James Bay	Marilyn Wood		F	Timmins				
Toronto Centre	Bob Rae	incumbent MP & Former Premier of Ontario.						
Toronto—Danforth	Andrew Lang	2008 candidate in this riding	M	Toronto	Communications Manager			
Trinity—Spadina	Christine Innes	2008 candidate in this riding; wife of former MP Tony Ianno	F	Toronto	Lawyer			
Vaughan	Mario Ferri	former York regional councillor	M					
Welland	John Maloney	Former Member of Parliament	M	Port Colborne	Lawyer			
Wellington—Halton Hills	Barry Peters		M					
Whitby—Oshawa	Trevor Bardens							
Willowdale	Martha Hall Findlay	incumbent MP and 2006 Liberal leadership candidate						
Windsor—Tecumseh	Pat Brough		F	Windsor	Investment Adviser			
Windsor West	Melanie Deveau		F		Private Broadcaster			
York Centre	Ken Dryden	incumbent MP, Liberal leadership candidate, former cabinet minister, and only sitting MP who is a member of the Hockey Hall of Fame.						
York—Simcoe	Cynthia Wesley-Esquimaux	University of Toronto Professor, media commentator						
York South—Weston	Alan Tonks	incumbent MP						
York West	Judy Sgro	incumbent MP						

== Manitoba — 14 Seats ==
Riding	Candidate's Name	Notes	Gender	Residence	Occupation	Votes	%	Rank
Brandon—Souris	Wes Penner		M	Winnipeg				
Charleswood—St. James—Assiniboia	Rob Clement		M	Winnipeg	Businessman			
Churchill	Sydney Garrioch	Former Grand Chief of the Manitoba Keewatinowi Okimakanak	M	Cross Lake				
Dauphin—Swan River—Marquette	Wendy Menzies		F	Neepawa				
Elmwood—Transcona	Ilona Niemczyk		F	Winnipeg				
Kildonan—St. Paul	Victor Andres		M	Winnipeg	Businessman			
Portage—Lisgar	Martha Jo Willard	2008 Candidate in Brandon—Souris	F	Winnipeg	Physician			
Provencher	Terry Hayward	Retired Civil Servant, Agriculture Canada	M	Anola				
Saint Boniface	Raymond Simard	Former Member of Parliament	M	Winnipeg	Management Consultant			
Selkirk—Interlake	Duncan Geisler		M	Ashern	Lawyer			
Winnipeg Centre	Allan Wise	Staff member: Community Education Development Association (CEDA)	M	Winnipeg				
Winnipeg North	Kevin Lamoureux	incumbent MP	M	Winnipeg				
Winnipeg South	Terry Duguid	Winnipeg City councillor, candidate for Kildonan-St. Paul in 2004 and 2006	M	Winnipeg	President			
Winnipeg South Centre	Anita Neville	incumbent MP,	F	Winnipeg				

== Saskatchewan — 14 seats ==
Riding	Candidate's Name	Notes	Gender	Residence	Occupation	Votes	%	Rank
Battlefords—Lloydminster	Jordan Laplante		M					
Blackstrap	Deborah Walker		F					
Cypress Hills—Grasslands	Duane Filson	2008 Candidate in this riding	M	Woodrow	Farmer			
Desnethé—Missinippi—Churchill River	Gabe LaFond		M	Saskatoon				
Palliser	Russell Collicott		M					
Prince Albert	Ronald Wassill		M					
Regina—Lumsden—Lake Centre	Monica Lysack	2008 Candidate in the same riding.	F	Regina				
Regina—Qu'Appelle	Jackie Miller		F					
Saskatoon—Humboldt	Darren Hill	City Councillor, Saskatoon.	M	Saskatoon				
Saskatoon—Rosetown—Biggar	Lee Reaney		M					
Saskatoon—Wanuskewin	Patricia Zipchen		F					
Souris—Moose Mountain	Gerald Borrowman		M					
Wascana	Ralph Goodale	Incumbent MP	M					
Yorkton—Melville	Kash Andreychuk		M					

== Alberta — 28 seats ==
Riding	Candidate's Name	Notes	Gender	Residence	Occupation	Votes	%	Rank
Calgary Centre	Jennifer Pollock	2006 and 2008 candidate in Calgary-West.	F	Calgary				
Calgary Centre-North	Stephen Randall		M		Academic			
Calgary East	Josipa Petrunic		F	Calgary	University Researcher			
Calgary Northeast	Cameron Stewart		M		Teacher			
Calgary—Nose Hill	Margaret McLeod		F	Calgary	Retired Psychologist			
Calgary Southeast	Brian MacPhee		M	Calgary				
Calgary Southwest	Marlene LaMontagne	2008 candidate in Calgary Southwest and 2000 candidate in Macleod.	F	Calgary	Retired Businesswoman			
Calgary West	Janice Kinch		F					
Crowfoot	Omar Harb		M					
Edmonton Centre	Mary MacDonald		F					
Edmonton East	Shafik Ruda		M	Edmonton	IT Consultant			
Edmonton—Leduc	Donna Lynn Smith	2008 candidate in this riding	F	Edmonton				
Edmonton—Mill Woods—Beaumont	Michael Butler	2008 candidate in this riding for the New Democratic Party	M	Edmonton				
Edmonton—St. Albert	Kevin Taron		M	Edmonton	Reservist			
Edmonton—Sherwood Park	Rick Szostak	2008 candidate in the same riding.	M	Edmonton	Professor			
Edmonton—Spruce Grove	Chris Austin	2008 candidate in this riding	M	Edmonton				
Edmonton—Strathcona	Matthew Sinclair		M					
Fort McMurray—Athabasca	Karen Young		F					
Lethbridge	Michael Cormican	2006 and 2008 candidate in this riding	M	Lethbridge	Retired			
Macleod	Nicole Hankel		F					
Medicine Hat	Normand Boucher		M					
Peace River	Corina Ganton		F					
Red Deer	Andrew Lineker		M					
Vegreville—Wainwright	Ronald Williams		M					
Westlock—St. Paul	Rob Fox		M					
Wetaskiwin	Christopher Anderson		M					
Wild Rose	John Reilly		M	Canmore	Retired Judge			
Yellowhead	Zach Siezmagraff		M					

== British Columbia — 36 seats ==
Riding	Candidate's Name	Notes	Gender	Residence	Occupation	Votes	%	Rank
Abbotsford	Madeleine Hardin	Liberal Party member for 10 years	F	Abbotsford	University teacher at UFV			
British Columbia Southern Interior	Shan Lavell		F					
Burnaby—Douglas	Ken Low	Liberal Candidate in Vancouver East in 2008	M	Vancouver	Professional Engineer			
Burnaby—New Westminster	Garth Evans		M					
Cariboo—Prince George	Sangeeta Lalli		F					
Chilliwack—Fraser Canyon	Diane Janzen		F					
Delta—Richmond East	Alan Beesley		M					
Esquimalt—Juan de Fuca	Lillian Szpak		F		Langford City Councillor			
Fleetwood—Port Kells	Pam Dhanoa		F					
Kamloops—Thompson—Cariboo	Todd Murray		M		Former riding association president			
Kelowna—Lake Country	Kris Stewart		F					
Kootenay—Columbia	Betty Aitchison		F					
Langley	Rebecca Darnell		F					
Nanaimo—Alberni	Renee Miller		F					
Nanaimo—Cowichan	Brian Fillmore		M					
Newton—North Delta	Sukh Dhaliwal	Incumbent MP	M		Engineer			
New Westminster—Coquitlam	Ken Lee		M	New Westminster	Engineer			
North Vancouver	Taleeb Noormohamed		M		Technology company CEO			
Okanagan—Coquihalla	John Kidder		M					
Okanagan—Shuswap	Janna Francis		F		Social Worker			
Pitt Meadows—Maple Ridge—Mission	Mandeep Bhuller		M					
Port Moody—Westwood—Port Coquitlam	Stewart McGillivray		M					
Prince George—Peace River	Ben Levine		M	Prince George	Lawyer			
Richmond	Joe Peschisolido	Former MP	M	Richmond				
Saanich—Gulf Islands	Renée Hetherington		F	North Saanich	Scientist			
Skeena—Bulkley Valley	Kyle Warwick		M					
South Surrey—White Rock—Cloverdale	Hardy Staub	Former mayor of White Rock	M					
Surrey North	Shinder Purewal	Liberal candidate in 2000	M					
Vancouver Centre	Hedy Fry	Incumbent MP	F		Doctor			
Vancouver East	Roma Ahi		F					
Vancouver Island North	Michael Holland		M		Lawyer			
Vancouver Kingsway	Wendy Yuan	2008 Candidate in the same riding	F	Vancouver	Businesswoman			
Vancouver Quadra	Joyce Murray	Incumbent MP	F		Environmentalist, Businesswoman			
Vancouver South	Ujjal Dosanjh	Incumbent MP	M		Lawyer			
Victoria	Christopher Causton		M					
West Vancouver—Sunshine Coast—Sea to Sky Country	Daniel Veniez	Senior cabinet aide for Brian Mulroney.	M					

== Yukon — 1 seat ==
Riding	Candidate's Name	Notes	Gender	Residence	Occupation	Votes	%	Rank
Yukon	Larry Bagnell	Incumbent MP	M		Executive Director			

== Northwest Territories — 1 seat ==
Riding	Candidate's Name	Notes	Gender	Residence	Occupation	Votes	%	Rank
Western Arctic	Joe Handley	Former Premier of the Northwest Territories	M	Yellowknife	Consultant			

== Nunavut — 1 seat ==
Riding	Candidate's Name	Notes	Gender	Residence	Occupation	Votes	%	Rank
Nunavut	Paul Okalik	Former Premier of Nunavut.	M		Former premier			

== See also ==
- Results of the Canadian federal election, 2008
- Results by riding for the Canadian federal election, 2008
