= Results of the 2000 Canadian federal election by riding =

This is a seat by seat list of candidates in the 2000 Canadian election.

For more information about the election see 2000 Canadian federal election.

== Abbreviations guide ==
- Alliance – **Canadian Reform Conservative Alliance**
- BQ – **Bloc Québécois**
- CAP – **Canadian Action Party**
- Comm. – **Communist Party of Canada**
- Green – **Green Party of Canada**
- Ind. – **Independent**
- Liberal – **Liberal Party of Canada**
- Mar. – **Marijuana Party**
- M-L – **Marxist-Leninist Party of Canada**
- NA – **Nil** (Note: Nil was used by Elections Canada for candidates who were not members of a registered party. In this election the Christian Heritage Party lost its registration due to not fielding 50 candidates, and all its candidates were listed as Nil.)
- NLP – **Natural Law Party**
- NDP – **New Democratic Party**
- PC – **Progressive Conservative Party of Canada**

=== Markup ===
- Names in **boldface type** represent party leaders and cabinet ministers.
- † represents that the incumbent chose not to run again.
- § represents that the incumbent was defeated for nomination.

NOTE: All candidate names are those on the official list of confirmed candidates; names in media or on party websites may differ slightly.

== Newfoundland and Labrador ==
Electoral district	Candidates					Incumbent
Electoral district	Liberal	Canadian Alliance	NDP	PC	Other	Incumbent
Bonavista—Trinity—Conception	Brian Tobin; 22,096; 54.38%	Randy Wayne Dawe; 1,051; 2.59%	Fraser March; 6,473; 15.93%	Jim Morgan; 11,009; 27.10%		Fred Mifflin†
Burin—St. George's	Bill Matthews; 14,603; 47.52%	Peter Fenwick; 1,511; 4.92%	David Sullivan; 924; 3.01%	Fred Pottle; 5,798; 18.87%	Sam Synard (NA); 7,891; 25.68%	Bill Matthews (Note: Matthews defected from PC Party in August 1999.)
Gander—Grand Falls	George Baker; 15,874; 55.02%	Orville Penney; 1,912; 6.63%	Bill Broderick; 2,876; 9.97%	Roger K. Pike; 8,191; 28.39%		George Baker
Humber—St. Barbe—Baie Verte	Gerry Byrne; 15,405; 48.53%	Murdock Cole; 1,702; 5.36%	Trevor Taylor; 8,297; 26.14%	Peter McBreairty; 6,340; 19.97%		Gerry Byrne
Labrador	Lawrence O'Brien; 7,153; 68.99%	Eugene Burt; 677; 6.53%	Amanda Will; 1,284; 12.38%	Hayward Broomfield; 1,254; 12.09%		Lawrence O'Brien
St. John's East	Peter Miller; 13,835; 31.19%	Garry Hartle; 1,144; 2.58%	Carol Cantwell; 5,395; 12.16%	Norman E. Doyle; 23,606; 53.22%	Judy Day (Ind.); 254 0.57%	Norman Doyle
St. John's East	Peter Miller; 13,835; 31.19%	Garry Hartle; 1,144; 2.58%	Carol Cantwell; 5,395; 12.16%	Norman E. Doyle; 23,606; 53.22%	Michael Rayment (NLP); 122 0.28%	Norman Doyle
St. John's West	Chuck Furey; 14,137; 33.01%	Eldon Drost; 840; 1.96%	Dave Curtis; 4,744; 11.08%	Loyola Hearn; 22,959; 53.62%	Michael Rendell (NLP); 141; 0.33%	Loyola Hearn

== Prince Edward Island ==
Electoral district	Candidates					Incumbent
Electoral district	Liberal	Canadian Alliance	NDP	PC	Other	Incumbent
Cardigan	Lawrence MacAulay; 8,545; 48.06%	Darrell Hickox; 500; 2.81%	Deborah Kelly Hawkes; 465; 2.62%	Kevin MacAdam; 8,269; 46.51%		Lawrence MacAulay
Egmont	Joe McGuire; 9,227; 50.05%	Jeff Sullivan; 952; 5.16%	Nancy Wallace; 1,139; 6.18%	John Griffin; 7,116; 38.60%		Joe McGuire
Hillsborough	Shawn Murphy; 8,277; 41.81%	Gerry Stewart; 1,005; 5.08%	Dody Crane; 4,328; 21.86%	Darren W. Peters; 6,039; 30.50%	Peter Cameron (NLP); 92 0.46%	George Proud†
Hillsborough	Shawn Murphy; 8,277; 41.81%	Gerry Stewart; 1,005; 5.08%	Dody Crane; 4,328; 21.86%	Darren W. Peters; 6,039; 30.50%	Baird Judson (NA); 58 0.29%	George Proud†
Malpeque	Wayne Easter; 8,972; 48.62%	Chris Wall; 1,262; 6.84%	Ken Bingham; 782; 4.24%	Jim Gorman; 7,186; 38.94%	Jeremy Stiles (Green); 250; 1.35%	Wayne Easter

== Nova Scotia ==
Electoral district	Candidates					Incumbent
Electoral district	Liberal	Canadian Alliance	NDP	PC	Other	Incumbent
Bras d'Or—Cape Breton	Rodger Cuzner; 20,815; 54.85%	John M. Currie; 1,483; 3.91%	Michelle Dockrill; 7,537; 19.86%	Alfie MacLeod; 8,114; 21.38%		Michelle Dockrill
Cumberland—Colchester	Dianne Brushett; 10,271; 26.61%	Bryden Ryan; 4,981; 12.91%	James Arthur Harpell; 4,629; 11.99%	Bill Casey; 18,716; 48.49%		Bill Casey
Dartmouth	**Bernie Boudreau**; 12,408; 33.14%	Jordi Morgan; 3,282; 8.76%	Wendy Lill; 13,585; 36.28%	Tom McInnis; 8,085; 21.59%	Charles Spurr (M-L); 86; 0.23%	Wendy Lill
Halifax	Kevin Little; 13,539; 32.99%	Amery Boyer; 2,348; 5.72%	**Alexa McDonough**; 16,563; 40.36%	Paul Fitzgibbons; 7,255; 17.68%	Kevin Dumont Corkill (M-L); 113 0.28%	**Alexa McDonough**
Halifax	Kevin Little; 13,539; 32.99%	Amery Boyer; 2,348; 5.72%	**Alexa McDonough**; 16,563; 40.36%	Paul Fitzgibbons; 7,255; 17.68%	Michael G. Oddy (Green); 590 1.44%	**Alexa McDonough**
Halifax	Kevin Little; 13,539; 32.99%	Amery Boyer; 2,348; 5.72%	**Alexa McDonough**; 16,563; 40.36%	Paul Fitzgibbons; 7,255; 17.68%	Mike Patriquen (Mar.); 627 1.53%	**Alexa McDonough**
Halifax West	Geoff Regan; 18,327; 39.21%	Hilda Stevens; 4,531; 9.70%	Gordon Earle; 14,016; 29.99%	Charles Cirtwill; 9,701; 20.76%	Tony Seed (M-L); 160; 0.34%	Gordon Earle
Kings—Hants	Claude O'Hara; 13,213; 30.23%	Gerry Fulton; 4,618; 10.56%	Kaye Johnson; 7,244; 16.57%	Scott Brison; 17,612; 40.29%	Richard Hennigar (NLP); 133 0.30%	**Joe Clark**‡ (Note: Clark ran in Calgary Centre.)
Kings—Hants	Claude O'Hara; 13,213; 30.23%	Gerry Fulton; 4,618; 10.56%	Kaye Johnson; 7,244; 16.57%	Scott Brison; 17,612; 40.29%	Jim King (Mar.); 669 1.53%	**Joe Clark**‡
Kings—Hants	Claude O'Hara; 13,213; 30.23%	Gerry Fulton; 4,618; 10.56%	Kaye Johnson; 7,244; 16.57%	Scott Brison; 17,612; 40.29%	Graham Jake MacDonald (Comm.); 85 0.19%	**Joe Clark**‡
Kings—Hants	Claude O'Hara; 13,213; 30.23%	Gerry Fulton; 4,618; 10.56%	Kaye Johnson; 7,244; 16.57%	Scott Brison; 17,612; 40.29%	Kenneth MacEachern (Ind.); 140 0.32%	**Joe Clark**‡
Pictou—Antigonish—Guysborough	Raymond Mason; 12,585; 31.57%	Harvey Henderson; 2,930; 7.35%	Wendy Panagopoulos; 4,498; 11.28%	Peter G. MacKay; 19,298; 48.41%	Darryl Gallivan (Ind.); 552; 1.38%	Peter MacKay
Sackville—Musquodoboit Valley—Eastern Shore	Bruce Stephen; 12,864; 32.56%	Bill Stevens; 4,773; 12.08%	Peter Stoffer; 13,619; 34.48%	Wade Marshall; 7,589; 19.21%	Melanie Patriquen (Mar.); 658; 1.67%	Peter Stoffer
South Shore	Derek Wells; 12,677; 35.12%	Evan Walters; 4,697; 13.01%	Bill Zimmerman; 4,394; 12.17%	Gerald Keddy; 14,328; 39.69%		Gerald Keddy
Sydney—Victoria	Mark Eyking; 19,388; 49.83%	Rod A. M. Farrell; 1,528; 3.93%	Peter Mancini; 14,216; 36.53%	Anna Curtis-Steele; 3,779; 9.71%		Peter Mancini
West Nova	Robert Thibault; 12,783; 36.09%	Mike Donaldson; 6,581; 18.58%	Phil Roberts; 3,976; 11.23%	Mark Muise; 12,080; 34.11%		Mark Muise

== New Brunswick ==
Electoral district	Candidates					Incumbent
Electoral district	Liberal	Canadian Alliance	NDP	PC	Other	Incumbent
Acadie—Bathurst	Bernard Thériault; 20,362; 40.27%	Jean Gauvin; 2,314; 4.58%	Yvon Godin; 23,568; 46.61%	Alcide Leger; 4,321; 8.55%		Yvon Godin
Beausejour—Petitcodiac	Dominic LeBlanc; 21,465; 47.10%	Tom Taylor; 6,256; 13.73%	Inka Milewski; 3,217; 7.06%	Angela Vautour; 18,716; 32.11%		Angela Vautour (Note: Vautour defected from the NDP in 1999.)
Fredericton	Andy Scott; 14,175; 38.60%	Allan D. Neill; 8,814; 24.00%	Michael Dunn; 2,584; 7.04%	Raj Venugopal; 10,919; 29.73%	William H. Parker (NLP); 233; 0.63%	Andy Scott
Fundy—Royal	John King; 11,422; 30.28%	Rob Moore; 8,392; 22.25%	John Calder; 2,628; 6.97%	John Herron; 15,279; 40.51%		John Herron
Madawaska—Restigouche	Jeannot Castonguay; 19,913; 52.27%	Scott Chedore; 1,958; 5.14%	Claude J. Albert; 1,811; 4.75%	Jean F. Dubé; 14,417; 37.84%		Jean F. Dubé
Miramichi	Charles Hubbard; 17,047; 51.44%	Ken Clark; 5,298; 15.99%	Allan Goodfellow; 2,453; 7.40%	David Kelly; 8,341; 25.17%		Charles Hubbard
Moncton—Riverview—Dieppe	**Claudette Bradshaw**; 26,545; 58.74%	Kathryn M. Barnes; 8,130; 17.99%	Hélène Lapointe; 3,139; 6.95%	Serge Landry; 7,082; 15.67%	Laurent Maltais (NLP); 297; 0.66%	**Claudette Bradshaw**
New Brunswick Southwest	Winston Gamblin; 8,442; 27.53%	John Erbs; 6,562; 21.40%	Habib Kilisli; 1,173; 3.83%	Greg Thompson; 14,489; 47.25%		Greg Thompson
Saint John	Paul Zed; 9,535; 28.98%	Peter Touchbourne; 2,980; 9.06%	Rod Hill; 2,989; 9.09%	Elsie Wayne; 16,751; 50.92%	Miville Couture (NLP); 52 0.16%	Elsie Wayne
Saint John	Paul Zed; 9,535; 28.98%	Peter Touchbourne; 2,980; 9.06%	Rod Hill; 2,989; 9.09%	Elsie Wayne; 16,751; 50.92%	Vern M. Garnett (Green); 131 0.40%	Elsie Wayne
Saint John	Paul Zed; 9,535; 28.98%	Peter Touchbourne; 2,980; 9.06%	Rod Hill; 2,989; 9.09%	Elsie Wayne; 16,751; 50.92%	Jim Wood (Mar.); 461 1.40%	Elsie Wayne
Tobique—Mactaquac	Andy Savoy; 10,897; 33.60%	Adam Richardson; 9,573; 29.51%	Carolyn Van Dine; 1,216; 3.75%	Gilles Bernier; 10,750; 33.14%		Gilles Bernier

== Quebec ==
=== Eastern Quebec ===
Electoral district	Candidates						Incumbent
Electoral district	BQ	Liberal	Canadian Alliance	NDP	PC	Other	Incumbent
Bellechasse—Etchemins— Montmagny—L'Islet	François Langlois; 14,973; 37.44%	Gilbert Normand; 19,163; 47.91%	Jean-Claude Roy; 4,224; 10.56%		Suzanne Lafond; 1,636; 4.09%		Gilbert Normand
Bonaventure—Gaspé—Îles- de-la-Madeleine—Pabok	Raynald Blais; 15,532; 43.00%	Georges Farrah; 19,213; 53.19%	Linda Fournier; 764; 2.12%	Fred Kraenzel; 613; 1.70%			Yvan Bernier
Kamouraska—Rivière-du-Loup— Témiscouata—Les Basques	Paul Crête; 23,319; 59.99%	Helen Ouellet; 11,794; 30.34%	René Théberge; 1,373; 3.53%	Elaine Côté; 836; 2.15%	André Pacquet; 1,382; 3.56%	Normand Fournier (M-L); 170; 0.44%	Paul Crête
Lévis-et-Chutes-de-la-Chaudière	Antoine Dubé; 26,398; 41.85%	Shirley Baril; 21,522; 34.12%	Jacques Bergeron; 9,152; 14.51%	France Michaud; 1,411; 2.24%	Réal St-Laurent; 4,222; 6.69%	André Cloutier (Comm.); 374; 0.59%	Antoine Dubé; Lévis
Matapédia—Matane	Jean-Yves Roy; 14,678; 46.64%	Marc Bélanger; 14,402; 45.76%		Karine Paquet-Gauthier; 935; 2.97%	Germain Dumas; 1,456; 4.63%		René Canuel
Rimouski—Neigette-et-La-Mitis	Suzanne Tremblay; 19,759; 59.55%	Réal Marmen; 9,795; 29.52%	Gerard Gosselin; 1,280; 3.86%	René Lemieux; 525; 1.58%	Réal Blais; 1,150; 3.47%	Lyse Beauchemin (NLP); 673; 2.03%	Suzanne Tremblay; Rimouski—Mitis

=== Côte-Nord and Saguenay ===
Electoral district	Candidates						Incumbent
Electoral district	BQ	Liberal	Canadian Alliance	NDP	PC	Other	Incumbent
Beauport—Montmorency—Côte-de-Beaupré—Île-d'Orléans	Michel Guimond; 21,341; 41.55%	Chantal Plante; 18,714; 36.43%	Robert Giroux; 5,878; 11.44%	Eric Hébert; 869; 1.69%	Lise Bernier; 2,916; 5.68%	Jean Bédard (M-L); 283 0.55%	Michel Guimond; Beauport—Montmorency—Orléans
Beauport—Montmorency—Côte-de-Beaupré—Île-d'Orléans	Michel Guimond; 21,341; 41.55%	Chantal Plante; 18,714; 36.43%	Robert Giroux; 5,878; 11.44%	Eric Hébert; 869; 1.69%	Lise Bernier; 2,916; 5.68%	Mathieu Giroux (Mar.); 1,364 2.66%	Michel Guimond; Beauport—Montmorency—Orléans
Charlevoix	Gérard Asselin; 20,479; 61.44%	Marjolaine Gagnon; 9,308; 27.93%	Pierre Paradis; 1,905; 5.72%	Joss Duhaime; 484; 1.45%	Doris Grondin; 1,154; 3.46%		Gérard Asselin
Chicoutimi—Le Fjord	Noel Tremblay; 15,073; 36.17%	André Harvey; 20,105; 48.24%	Douglas Schroeder-Tabah; 2,001; 4.80%	Alain Ranger; 698; 1.67%		Mauril Desbiens (Ind.); 3,797; 9.11%	André Harvey (Note: André Harvey was elected as a Progressive-Conservative in the 1997 election but left the PC caucus to sit as a Liberal MP.); Chicoutimi
Jonquière	Jocelyne Girard-Bujold; 16,189; 50.07%	Jean-Guy Boily; 11,574; 35.80%	Sylvaine Néron; 3,428; 10.60%	Michel Deraiche; 1,139; 3.52%			Jocelyne Girard-Bujold
Lac-Saint-Jean—Saguenay	Stéphan Tremblay; 21,391; 66.17%	Jérôme Tremblay; 7,536; 23.31%	Yannick Caron; 1,536; 4.75%	Linda Proulx; 417; 1.29%	Claude Gagnon; 535; 1.65%	Gilles Lavoie (Ind.); 912; 2.82%	Stéphan Tremblay; Lac-Saint-Jean
Manicouagan	Ghislain Fournier; 11,595; 53.24%	Robert Labadie; 7,770; 35.68%	Laurette de Champlain; 1,197; 5.50%	Normand Caplette; 386; 1.77%	Gaby-Gabriel Robert; 830; 3.81%		Ghislain Fournier
Roberval	Michel Gauthier; 16,928; 55.06%	Jean-Pierre Boivin; 10,680; 34.74%	Raymond A. Brideau; 1,830; 5.95%	Alain Giguère; 437; 1.42%	Marie-Christine Huot; 870; 2.83%		Michel Gauthier

=== Quebec City ===
Electoral district	Candidates							Incumbent
Electoral district	BQ	Liberal	Canadian Alliance	NDP	PC	Marxist-Leninist	Other	Incumbent
Charlesbourg—Jacques-Cartier	Richard Marceau; 21,867; 38.29%	Isabelle Thiverge; 21,045; 36.85%	Gérard Latulippe; 8,801; 15.41%	Françoise Dicaire; 1,000; 1.75%	Dann Murray; 3,256; 5.70%		Samuel Moisan-Domm (Green); 1,136; 1.99%	Richard Marceau; Charlesbourg
Louis-Hébert	Hélène Alarie; 21,240; 36.88%	Hélène Scherrer; 23,695; 41.14%	Léonce-E. Roy; 5,887; 10.22%	Karl Adomeit; 1,200; 2.08%	Clermont Gauthier; 5,189; 9.01%	Gisèle Desrochers; 382; 0.66%		Hélène Alarie
Quebec	Christiane Gagnon; 22,793; 43.43%	Claudette Tessier-Couture; 18,619; 35.48%	Michel Rivard; 3,980; 7.58%	Jean-Marie Fiset; 1,714; 3.25%	Marc Jalbert; 3,171; 6.04%	Claude Moreau; 255; 0.49%	Pierre-E. Paradis (Mar.); 1,480 2.82%	Christiane Gagnon
Quebec	Christiane Gagnon; 22,793; 43.43%	Claudette Tessier-Couture; 18,619; 35.48%	Michel Rivard; 3,980; 7.58%	Jean-Marie Fiset; 1,714; 3.25%	Marc Jalbert; 3,171; 6.04%	Claude Moreau; 255; 0.49%	Gilles Rochette (NLP); 482 0.92%	Christiane Gagnon
Quebec East	Jean-Paul Marchand; 21,166; 37.47%	Jean Guy Carignan; 21,813; 38.61%	Robert Martel; 8,594; 15.21%	Majella Desmeules; 1,192; 2.11%	Richard Joncas; 3,727; 6.60%			Jean-Paul Marchand

=== Central Quebec ===
Electoral district	Candidates						Incumbent
Electoral district	BQ	Liberal	Canadian Alliance	NDP	PC	Other	Incumbent
Bas-Richelieu—Nicolet—Bécancour	Louis Plamondon; 25,266; 56.92%	Roland Paradis; 13,781; 31.04%	Frédéric Lajoie; 2,078; 4.68%	Raymond Dorion; 421; 0.95%	Gabriel Rousseau; 1,944; 4.38%	Black D. Blackburn (Mar.); 901; 2.03%	Louis Plamondon; Richelieu
Berthier—Montcalm	Michel Bellehumeur; 31,647; 57.06%	Jean-Carle Hudon; 16,669; 30.05%	Réal Naud; 2,851; 5.14%	Jean-Pierre De Billy; 823; 1.48%	Paul Lavigne; 2,011; 3.63%	Sébastien Hénault (Mar.); 1,464; 2.64%	Michel Bellehumeur
Champlain	Marcel Gagnon; 20,423; 45.26%	Julie Boulet; 20,408; 45.23%	Eric Labranche; 2,599; 5.76%	Philippe Toone; 672; 1.49%		Paul Giroux (Mar.); 1,020; 2.26%	Réjean Lefebvre†
Joliette	Pierre Paquette; 23,615; 52.20%	Robert Malo; 14,820; 32.76%	Clément Lévesque; 2,432; 5.38%	François Rivest; 1,085; 2.40%	Eric Champagne; 2,730; 6.03%	Bob Aubin (Comm.); 560; 1.24%	René Laurin†
Lotbinière—L'Érable	Odina Desrochers; 15,351; 45.64%	Luc Dastous; 12,563; 37.35%	Pierre Allard; 2,827; 8.40%	Dominique Vaillancourt; 538; 1.60%	Jean Landry; 2,357; 7.01%		Odina Desrochers; Lotbinière
Portneuf	Patrice Dallaire; 15,444; 35.23%	Claude Duplain; 17,877; 40.78%	Howard Bruce; 6,699; 15.28%		François Dion; 3,819; 8.71%		Pierre de Savoye†
Repentigny	Benoît Sauvageau; 33,627; 57.80%	David Veillette; 15,635; 26.88%	Michel Paulette; 2,964; 5.09%	Pierre Péclet; 831; 1.43%	Michel Carignan; 3,122; 5.37%	Lise Dufour (Mar.); 1,997; 3.43%	Benoît Sauvageau
Saint-Maurice	François Marchand; 16,821; 38.96%	**Jean Chrétien**; 23,345; 54.07%	Jean-Guy Mercier; 1,461; 3.38%	Raymond Chase; 359; 0.83%	Pierre Blais; 966; 2.24%	Sylvain Archambault (Comm.); 223; 0.52%	**Jean Chrétien**
Trois-Rivières	Yves Rocheleau; 22,405; 46.67%	Denis Normandin; 20,606; 42.92%	Luc Legaré; 2,161; 4.50%	David Horlock; 512; 1.07%	Scott Healy; 1,599; 3.33%	Alexandre Deschênes (M-L); 184 0.38%	Yves Rocheleau
Trois-Rivières	Yves Rocheleau; 22,405; 46.67%	Denis Normandin; 20,606; 42.92%	Luc Legaré; 2,161; 4.50%	David Horlock; 512; 1.07%	Scott Healy; 1,599; 3.33%	Gilles Raymond (NLP); 538 1.12%	Yves Rocheleau

=== Eastern Townships ===
Electoral district	Candidates						Incumbent
Electoral district	BQ	Liberal	Canadian Alliance	NDP	PC	Other	Incumbent
Beauce	Gary Morin; 12,323; 26.51%	Claude Drouin; 26,033; 56.01%	Alain Guay; 5,452; 11.73%	Pierre Malano; 436; 0.94%	Gérard Parent; 1,628; 3.50%	Louis Girard (NLP); 611; 1.31%	Claude Drouin
Brome—Missisquoi	André Leroux; 13,363; 31.17%	Denis Paradis; 21,545; 50.26%	Jacques Loyer; 1,977; 4.61%	Jeff Itcush; 480; 1.12%	Heward Grafftey; 5,502; 12.84%		Denis Paradis
Compton—Stanstead	Gaston Leroux; 14,808; 38.89%	David Price; 17,729; 46.56%	Marc Carrier; 2,061; 5.41%	Christine Moore; 580; 1.52%	Mary Ann Dewey-Plante; 2,422; 6.36%	Marc Roy (NLP); 476; 1.25%	David Price
Drummond	Pauline Picard; 18,970; 45.27%	André Béliveau; 14,335; 34.21%	Jacques Laurin; 1,621; 3.87%	Julie Philion; 423; 1.01%	Lyne Boisvert; 6,559; 15.65%		Pauline Picard
Frontenac—Mégantic	Jean-Guy Chrétien; 15,703; 42.27%	Gérard Binet; 17,069; 45.95%	Stéphane Musial; 1,751; 4.71%	Olivier Chalifoux; 427; 1.15%	Nicole Massicotte; 1,497; 4.03%	Pierre Luc Fournier (Mar.); 698; 1.88%	Jean-Guy Chrétien
Richmond—Arthabaska	André Bellavance; 18,067; 36.47%	Aldéi Beaudoin; 10,416; 21.03%	Philippe Ardilliez; 1,930; 3.90%	Vincent Bernier; 319; 0.64%	André Bachand; 18,430; 37.20%	Christian Simard (NLP); 375; 0.76%	André Bachand
Saint-Hyacinthe—Bagot	Yvan Loubier; 25,916; 55.41%	Michel Gaudette; 16,265; 34.77%	Jacques Bousquet; 2,161; 4.62%	Rachel Dicaire; 499; 1.07%	Frédéric Mantha; 1,932; 4.13%		Yvan Loubier
Shefford	Michel Benoit; 19,816; 43.95%	Diane St-Jacques; 20,707; 45.93%	Jean-Jacques Treyvaud; 1,867; 4.14%	Elizabeth Morey; 380; 0.84%	Audrey Castonguay; 1,498; 3.32%	Nicholas Cousineau (Mar.); 819; 1.82%	Diane St-Jacques
Sherbrooke	Serge Cardin; 23,559; 46.53%	Jean-François Rouleau; 21,182; 41.84%	Mark Quinlan; 2,284; 4.51%	Craig Wright; 677; 1.34%	Eric L'Heureux; 1,955; 3.86%	Joseph Adrien Serge Bourassa-Lacombe (Ind.); 294 0.58%	Serge Cardin
Sherbrooke	Serge Cardin; 23,559; 46.53%	Jean-François Rouleau; 21,182; 41.84%	Mark Quinlan; 2,284; 4.51%	Craig Wright; 677; 1.34%	Eric L'Heureux; 1,955; 3.86%	Daniel Jolicoeur (NLP); 495 0.98%	Serge Cardin
Sherbrooke	Serge Cardin; 23,559; 46.53%	Jean-François Rouleau; 21,182; 41.84%	Mark Quinlan; 2,284; 4.51%	Craig Wright; 677; 1.34%	Eric L'Heureux; 1,955; 3.86%	Serge Lachapelle (M-L); 186 0.37%	Serge Cardin

=== Montérégie ===
Electoral district	Candidates						Incumbent
Electoral district	BQ	Liberal	Canadian Alliance	NDP	PC	Other	Incumbent
Beauharnois—Salaberry	Daniel Turp; 20,938; 42.39%	Serge Marcil; 23,834; 48.26%	Stephane Renaud; 1,782; 3.61%	Elizabeth Clark; 703; 1.42%	Roma Myre; 2,133; 4.32%		Daniel Turp
Brossard—La Prairie	Nicolas Tétrault; 16,758; 32.94%	Jacques Saada; 26,806; 52.69%	Richard Bélisle; 2,973; 5.84%	Clémence Provencher; 852; 1.67%	Sylvain St-Louis; 2,783; 5.47%	Normand Chouinard (M-L); 172 0.34%	Jacques Saada
Brossard—La Prairie	Nicolas Tétrault; 16,758; 32.94%	Jacques Saada; 26,806; 52.69%	Richard Bélisle; 2,973; 5.84%	Clémence Provencher; 852; 1.67%	Sylvain St-Louis; 2,783; 5.47%	Sylvia Larrass (NLP); 528 1.04%	Jacques Saada
Chambly	Ghislain Lebel; 26,084; 49.94%	Denis Caron; 17,400; 33.31%	Gaétan Paquette; 2,780; 5.32%	Darren O'Toole; 769; 1.47%	Jacques Parenteau; 3,448; 6.60%	Sébastien Duclos (Mar.); 1,751; 3.35%	Ghislain Lebel
Châteauguay	Robert Lanctôt; 26,284; 47.12%	Carole Marcil; 22,972; 41.18%	Ricardo Lopez; 3,120; 5.59%	Robert Lindblad; 622; 1.12%	Réjeanne Rioux; 2,041; 3.66%	Margaret Larrass (NLP); 743; 1.33%	Maurice Godin†
Longueuil	Caroline St-Hilaire; 20,868; 52.25%	Sophie Joncas; 12,991; 32.53%	Michel Minguy; 2,066; 5.17%	Timothy Spurr; 655; 1.64%	Richard Lafleur; 2,210; 5.53%	Stéphane Chénier (M-L); 183 0.46%	Caroline St-Hilaire
Longueuil	Caroline St-Hilaire; 20,868; 52.25%	Sophie Joncas; 12,991; 32.53%	Michel Minguy; 2,066; 5.17%	Timothy Spurr; 655; 1.64%	Richard Lafleur; 2,210; 5.53%	David Fiset (Mar.); 968 2.42%	Caroline St-Hilaire
Saint-Bruno—Saint-Hubert	Pierrette Venne; 22,217; 43.98%	Claude Leblanc; 19,743; 39.08%	Jean Vézina; 3,305; 6.54%	Marie Henretta; 1,029; 2.04%	Otmane Brixi; 2,673; 5.29%	Maryève Daigle (Mar.); 1,546; 3.06%	Pierrette Venne
Saint-Jean	Claude Bachand; 22,686; 47.44%	Joseph Khoury; 17,262; 36.09%	Josée Coulombe; 3,169; 6.63%	Julien Patenaude; 698; 1.46%	Gérald L'Ecuyer; 2,764; 5.78%	Marc St-Jean (Mar.); 1,246; 2.61%	Claude Bachand
Saint-Lambert	Christian Picard; 16,519; 38.11%	Yolande Thibeault; 19,679; 45.40%	Nic Leblanc; 3,066; 7.07%		Walter Stirling; 2,704; 6.24%	Katherine Léveillé (Mar.); 1,377; 3.18%	Yolande Thibeault
Vaudreuil-Soulanges	Éric Cimon; 17,587; 34.49%	Nick Discepola; 26,292; 51.56%	Dean Drysdale; 4,188; 8.21%	Shaun G. Lynch; 904; 1.77%	Stratos Psarianos; 2,020; 3.96%		Nick Discepola
Verchères—Les Patriotes	Stéphane Bergeron; 28,696; 52.29%	Mark Provencher; 16,740; 30.50%	Stéphane Désilets; 2,870; 5.23%	Charles Bussières; 1,074; 1.96%	Frédéric Grenier; 3,859; 7.03%	Jonathan Bérubé (Mar.); 1,643; 2.99%	Stéphane Bergeron; Verchères

=== Eastern Montreal ===
Electoral district	Candidates								Incumbent
Electoral district	BQ	Liberal	Canadian Alliance	NDP	PC	Green	Marijuana	Other	Incumbent
Anjou—Rivière-des-Prairies	Jacques Dagenais; 14,755; 30.35%	Yvon Charbonneau; 28,134; 57.86%	Gianni Chiazzese; 2,005; 4.12%	Bruce Whelan; 624; 1.28%	Michel Tanguay; 2,034; 4.18%		Normand Néron; 918; 1.89%	Hélène Héroux (M-L); 151; 0.31%	Yvon Charbonneau
Hochelaga—Maisonneuve	Réal Ménard; 21,250; 49.20%	Louis Morena; 16,143; 37.38%	Stephanie Morency; 1,502; 3.48%	Milan Mirich; 767; 1.78%	Benoit Harbec; 1,751; 4.05%		Alex Néron; 1,227; 2.84%	Pierre Bibeau (Comm.); 274 0.63%	Réal Ménard
Hochelaga—Maisonneuve	Réal Ménard; 21,250; 49.20%	Louis Morena; 16,143; 37.38%	Stephanie Morency; 1,502; 3.48%	Milan Mirich; 767; 1.78%	Benoit Harbec; 1,751; 4.05%		Alex Néron; 1,227; 2.84%	Christine Dandenault (M-L); 275 0.64%	Réal Ménard
Laurier—Sainte-Marie	**Gilles Duceppe**; 23,473; 52.79%	Jean Philippe Côté; 11,451; 25.75%	Stéphane Prud'homme; 960; 2.16%	Richard Chartier; 2,111; 4.75%	Jean François Tessier; 1,879; 4.23%	Dylan Perceval-Maxwell; 2,169; 4.88%	Marc-Boris St-Maurice; 2,156; 4.85%	Ginette Boutet (M-L); 269; 0.60%	**Gilles Duceppe**
Mercier	Francine Lalonde; 24,755; 52.87%	Normand Biron; 15,416; 32.93%	J. Marc-Antoine Delsoin; 1,684; 3.60%	Nicholas Vikander; 480; 1.03%	Martin Gelgoot; 1,629; 3.48%	Richard Savignac; 1,813; 3.87%	Eric Duquette; 937; 2.00%	Geneviève Royer (M-L); 104; 0.22%	Francine Lalonde
Rosemont—Petite-Patrie	Bernard Bigras; 23,315; 49.13%	Claude Vigneault; 16,052; 33.83%	Etienne Morin; 1,354; 2.85%	Noémi Lo Pinto; 1,417; 2.99%	Marc Bissonnette; 2,006; 4.23%	Sébastien Chagnon-Jean; 1,475; 3.11%	Claude Messier; 1,486; 3.13%	Joanne Pritchard (NA); 114 0.24%	Bernard Bigras; Rosemont
Rosemont—Petite-Patrie	Bernard Bigras; 23,315; 49.13%	Claude Vigneault; 16,052; 33.83%	Etienne Morin; 1,354; 2.85%	Noémi Lo Pinto; 1,417; 2.99%	Marc Bissonnette; 2,006; 4.23%	Sébastien Chagnon-Jean; 1,475; 3.11%	Claude Messier; 1,486; 3.13%	Dorothy Sauras (Comm.); 233 0.49%	Bernard Bigras; Rosemont

=== Western Montreal ===
Electoral district	Candidates								Incumbent
Electoral district	BQ	Liberal	Canadian Alliance	NDP	PC	Green	Marijuana	Other	Incumbent
Lac-Saint-Louis	Guy Amyot; 3,913; 6.67%	Clifford Lincoln; 43,515; 74.16%	William F. Shaw; 4,223; 7.20%	Erin Sikora; 1,464; 2.50%	Daniel Gendron; 4,411; 7.52%		Elena D'Apollonia; 1,031; 1.76%	Garnet Colly (M-L); 119; 0.20%	Clifford Lincoln
LaSalle—Émard	Denis Martel; 11,805; 24.20%	**Paul Martin**; 32,069; 65.75%	Giuseppe Joe De Santis; 1,806; 3.70%	David Bernans; 837; 1.72%	Deepak T. Massand; 1,111; 2.28%		Mathieux St-Cyr; 765; 1.57%	Gilles Bigras (NLP); 273 0.56%	**Paul Martin**
LaSalle—Émard	Denis Martel; 11,805; 24.20%	**Paul Martin**; 32,069; 65.75%	Giuseppe Joe De Santis; 1,806; 3.70%	David Bernans; 837; 1.72%	Deepak T. Massand; 1,111; 2.28%		Mathieux St-Cyr; 765; 1.57%	Irma Ortiz (Comm.); 107 0.22%	**Paul Martin**
Mount Royal	Jean-Sebastien Houle; 1,740; 4.27%	Irwin Cotler; 33,118; 81.24%	Alex Gabanski; 1,444; 3.54%	Maria Pia Chávez; 1,034; 2.54%	Stephane Gelgoot; 2,489; 6.11%	Jean-Claude Balu; 681; 1.67%		Judith Chafoya (Comm.); 140 0.34%	Irwin Cotler
Mount Royal	Jean-Sebastien Houle; 1,740; 4.27%	Irwin Cotler; 33,118; 81.24%	Alex Gabanski; 1,444; 3.54%	Maria Pia Chávez; 1,034; 2.54%	Stephane Gelgoot; 2,489; 6.11%	Jean-Claude Balu; 681; 1.67%		Ena Kahn (NLP); 122 0.30%	Irwin Cotler
Notre-Dame-de-Grâce—Lachine	Jeannine Ouellet; 8,449; 18.11%	Marlene Jennings; 28,328; 60.72%	Darrin Etcovich; 2,022; 4.33%	Bruce Toombs; 2,208; 4.73%	Kathy Megyery; 3,352; 7.19%	Katie Graham; 1,031; 2.21%	Grégoire Faber; 897; 1.92%	Rachel Hoffman (M-L); 159 0.34%	Marlene Jennings
Notre-Dame-de-Grâce—Lachine	Jeannine Ouellet; 8,449; 18.11%	Marlene Jennings; 28,328; 60.72%	Darrin Etcovich; 2,022; 4.33%	Bruce Toombs; 2,208; 4.73%	Kathy Megyery; 3,352; 7.19%	Katie Graham; 1,031; 2.21%	Grégoire Faber; 897; 1.92%	Michael Wilson (NLP); 205 0.44%	Marlene Jennings
Outremont	Amir Khadir; 11,151; 28.29%	**Martin Cauchon**; 18,796; 47.68%	Josée Duchesneau; 1,283; 3.25%	Peter Graefe; 2,199; 5.58%	Robert Archambault; 3,190; 8.09%	Jan Schotte; 1,478; 3.75%	Huguette Plourde; 1,013; 2.57%	Louise Charron (M-L); 194 0.49%	**Martin Cauchon**
Outremont	Amir Khadir; 11,151; 28.29%	**Martin Cauchon**; 18,796; 47.68%	Josée Duchesneau; 1,283; 3.25%	Peter Graefe; 2,199; 5.58%	Robert Archambault; 3,190; 8.09%	Jan Schotte; 1,478; 3.75%	Huguette Plourde; 1,013; 2.57%	Pierre Smith (Comm.); 118 0.30%	**Martin Cauchon**
Pierrefonds—Dollard	Sylvie Brousseau; 5,937; 10.99%	Bernard Patry; 39,357; 72.85%	Neil Drabkin; 3,481; 6.44%	Adam Hodgins; 1,109; 2.05%	John Profit; 2,991; 5.54%		Jean-François Labrecque; 1,149; 2.13%		Bernard Patry
Saint-Laurent—Cartierville	Yves Beauregard; 5,838; 13.07%	**Stéphane Dion**; 32,861; 73.58%	Kaddis R. Sidaros; 1,909; 4.27%	Piper Elizabeth Huggins; 1,070; 2.40%	J. Pierre Rouleau; 2,308; 5.17%			Jean-Paul Bedard (M-L); 234 0.52%	**Stéphane Dion**
Saint-Laurent—Cartierville	Yves Beauregard; 5,838; 13.07%	**Stéphane Dion**; 32,861; 73.58%	Kaddis R. Sidaros; 1,909; 4.27%	Piper Elizabeth Huggins; 1,070; 2.40%	J. Pierre Rouleau; 2,308; 5.17%			Oscar Chavez (Comm.); 206 0.46%	**Stéphane Dion**
Saint-Laurent—Cartierville	Yves Beauregard; 5,838; 13.07%	**Stéphane Dion**; 32,861; 73.58%	Kaddis R. Sidaros; 1,909; 4.27%	Piper Elizabeth Huggins; 1,070; 2.40%	J. Pierre Rouleau; 2,308; 5.17%			Ken Fernandez (CAP); 232 0.52%	**Stéphane Dion**
Verdun—Saint-Henri—Saint -Paul—Pointe Saint-Charles	Pedro Utillano; 11,976; 29.37%	Raymond Lavigne; 20,905; 51.27%	Jacques Gendron; 2,098; 5.15%	Matthew McLauchlin; 1,003; 2.46%	Bernard Côté; 2,670; 6.55%	Lorraine Ann Craig; 933; 2.29%	Marc-André Roy; 924; 2.27%	William Lorensen (NA); 117 0.29%	Raymond Lavigne; Verdun—Saint-Henri
Verdun—Saint-Henri—Saint -Paul—Pointe Saint-Charles	Pedro Utillano; 11,976; 29.37%	Raymond Lavigne; 20,905; 51.27%	Jacques Gendron; 2,098; 5.15%	Matthew McLauchlin; 1,003; 2.46%	Bernard Côté; 2,670; 6.55%	Lorraine Ann Craig; 933; 2.29%	Marc-André Roy; 924; 2.27%	Bill Sloan (Comm.); 148 0.36%	Raymond Lavigne; Verdun—Saint-Henri
Westmount—Ville-Marie	Marcela Valdivia; 4,110; 10.71%	**Lucienne Robillard**; 23,093; 60.19%	Felix Cotte; 1,697; 4.42%	Willy Blomme; 1,990; 5.19%	Bryan Price; 4,597; 11.98%	Brian Sarwer-Foner; 1,245; 3.25%	Patrice Caron; 692; 1.80%	Saroj Bains (M-L); 150 0.39%	**Lucienne Robillard**
Westmount—Ville-Marie	Marcela Valdivia; 4,110; 10.71%	**Lucienne Robillard**; 23,093; 60.19%	Felix Cotte; 1,697; 4.42%	Willy Blomme; 1,990; 5.19%	Bryan Price; 4,597; 11.98%	Brian Sarwer-Foner; 1,245; 3.25%	Patrice Caron; 692; 1.80%	Allen Faguy (NLP); 96 0.25%	**Lucienne Robillard**
Westmount—Ville-Marie	Marcela Valdivia; 4,110; 10.71%	**Lucienne Robillard**; 23,093; 60.19%	Felix Cotte; 1,697; 4.42%	Willy Blomme; 1,990; 5.19%	Bryan Price; 4,597; 11.98%	Brian Sarwer-Foner; 1,245; 3.25%	Patrice Caron; 692; 1.80%	Michel Laporte (NA); 694 1.81%	**Lucienne Robillard**

=== Northern Montreal and Laval ===
Electoral district	Candidates								Incumbent
Electoral district	BQ	Liberal	Canadian Alliance	NDP	PC	Green	Marxist-Leninist	Other	Incumbent
Ahuntsic	Fatima El Amraoui; 17,132; 32.23%	Eleni Bakopanos; 28,643; 53.89%	Eugenia Romain; 1,816; 3.42%	Steve Moran; 997; 1.88%	Jessica Chartrand; 3,018; 5.68%	Mimi Ghosh; 1,123; 2.11%	Vincent Dorais; 159; 0.30%	Antonio Artuso (Comm.); 262; 0.49%	Eleni Bakopanos
Bourassa	Umberto Di Genova; 11,462; 28.07%	**Denis Coderre**; 25,403; 62.22%	Marcel Lys François; 1,435; 3.51%	Richard Gendron; 736; 1.80%	Marcel Pitre; 1,325; 3.25%		Claude Brunelle; 330; 0.81%	Ulises Nitor (Comm.); 137; 0.34%	**Denis Coderre**
Laval Centre	Madeleine Dalphond-Guiral; 23,746; 43.35%	Pierre Lafleur; 23,704; 43.27%	Eric Marchand; 2,437; 4.45%	Jean-Yves Dion; 832; 1.52%	Guy Fortin; 2,778; 5.07%	Julien Bernard; 1,285; 2.35%			Madeleine Dalphond-Guiral
Laval East	Mathieu Alarie; 24,726; 42.55%	Carole-Marie Allard; 26,018; 44.77%	Rosane Raymond; 2,354; 4.05%	Sujata Dey; 573; 0.99%	André G. Plourde; 2,459; 4.23%	Frédéric Gauvin; 660; 1.14%	Gabriel Cornellier-Brunelle; 178; 0.31%	Christian Lajoie (Mar.); 892 1.53%	Maud Debien†
Laval East	Mathieu Alarie; 24,726; 42.55%	Carole-Marie Allard; 26,018; 44.77%	Rosane Raymond; 2,354; 4.05%	Sujata Dey; 573; 0.99%	André G. Plourde; 2,459; 4.23%	Frédéric Gauvin; 660; 1.14%	Gabriel Cornellier-Brunelle; 178; 0.31%	Régent Millette (Ind.); 255 0.44%	Maud Debien†
Laval West	Manon Sauvé; 19,975; 32.27%	Raymonde Folco; 31,758; 51.30%	Leo Housakos; 4,631; 7.48%	Christian Patenaude; 764; 1.23%	Michael M. Fortier; 3,613; 5.84%	Luc Beaulieu; 983; 1.59%	Polyvios Tsakanikas; 180; 0.29%		Raymonde Folco
Papineau—Saint-Denis	Philippe Ordenes; 11,779; 26.60%	**Pierre Pettigrew**; 23,955; 54.10%	Yannis Felemegos; 2,114; 4.77%	Hans Marotte; 1,983; 4.48%	Emmanuel Préville; 1,215; 2.74%	Boris-Antoine Legault; 1,128; 2.55%	Peter Macrisopoulos; 482; 1.09%	Mustaque A. Sarker (Ind.); 738 1.67%	**Pierre Pettigrew**
Papineau—Saint-Denis	Philippe Ordenes; 11,779; 26.60%	**Pierre Pettigrew**; 23,955; 54.10%	Yannis Felemegos; 2,114; 4.77%	Hans Marotte; 1,983; 4.48%	Emmanuel Préville; 1,215; 2.74%	Boris-Antoine Legault; 1,128; 2.55%	Peter Macrisopoulos; 482; 1.09%	Antoine Théorêt-Poupart (Mar.); 886 2.00%	**Pierre Pettigrew**
Saint-Léonard—Saint-Michel	Marcel Ferlatte; 6,679; 14.47%	**Alfonso Gagliano**; 35,396; 76.66%	Daniel Champagne; 1,750; 3.79%	Sara Mayo; 528; 1.14%	Mostafa Ben Kirane; 1,057; 2.29%		Yves Le Seigle; 127; 0.28%	Karina Néron (Mar.); 635; 1.38%	**Alfonso Gagliano**

=== Laurentides, Outaouais and Northern Quebec ===
Electoral district	Candidates							Incumbent
Electoral district	BQ	Liberal	Canadian Alliance	NDP	PC	Natural Law	Other	Incumbent
Abitibi—Baie-James—Nunavik	François Lemieux; 15,567; 42.76%	Guy St-Julien; 18,198; 49.99%	François Dionne; 1,297; 3.56%	Daniel Fredrick; 534; 1.47%	Sylvain Gemme; 809; 2.22%			Guy St-Julien; Abitibi
Argenteuil—Papineau—Mirabel	Mario Laframboise; 21,713; 43.20%	Lise Bourgault; 21,171; 42.12%	Francine Labelle; 2,897; 5.76%	Didier Charles; 550; 1.09%	Jean-Denis Pelletier; 1,848; 3.68%	Marie-Thérèse Nault; 256; 0.51%	Pierre Audette (Mar.); 934 1.86%	Maurice Dumas; Argenteuil—Papineau
Argenteuil—Papineau—Mirabel	Mario Laframboise; 21,713; 43.20%	Lise Bourgault; 21,171; 42.12%	Francine Labelle; 2,897; 5.76%	Didier Charles; 550; 1.09%	Jean-Denis Pelletier; 1,848; 3.68%	Marie-Thérèse Nault; 256; 0.51%	Gilles Bisson (Green); 723 1.44%	Maurice Dumas; Argenteuil—Papineau
Argenteuil—Papineau—Mirabel	Mario Laframboise; 21,713; 43.20%	Lise Bourgault; 21,171; 42.12%	Francine Labelle; 2,897; 5.76%	Didier Charles; 550; 1.09%	Jean-Denis Pelletier; 1,848; 3.68%	Marie-Thérèse Nault; 256; 0.51%	Laurent Filion (NA); 167; 0.33%	Maurice Dumas; Argenteuil—Papineau
Gatineau	Richard Nadeau; 12,817; 25.40%	Mark Assad; 25,960; 51.45%	Stéphany Crowley; 5,069; 10.05%	Carl Hétu; 1,763; 3.49%	Michael F. Vasseur; 3,619; 7.17%	Jean-Claude Pommet; 472; 0.94%	Ronald Bélanger (Ind.); 389 0.77%	Mark Assad
Gatineau	Richard Nadeau; 12,817; 25.40%	Mark Assad; 25,960; 51.45%	Stéphany Crowley; 5,069; 10.05%	Carl Hétu; 1,763; 3.49%	Michael F. Vasseur; 3,619; 7.17%	Jean-Claude Pommet; 472; 0.94%	Samantha Demers (NA); 228 0.45%	Mark Assad
Gatineau	Richard Nadeau; 12,817; 25.40%	Mark Assad; 25,960; 51.45%	Stéphany Crowley; 5,069; 10.05%	Carl Hétu; 1,763; 3.49%	Michael F. Vasseur; 3,619; 7.17%	Jean-Claude Pommet; 472; 0.94%	Françoise Roy (M-L); 139; 0.28%	Mark Assad
Hull—Aylmer	Caroline Brouard; 10,051; 23.08%	Marcel Proulx; 22,385; 51.40%	Michel Geisterfer; 3,639; 8.36%	Peter Piening; 1,521; 3.49%	Guy Dufort; 4,181; 9.60%	Rita Bouchard; 426; 0.98%	Robert Brooks (CAP); 167 0.38%	Marcel Proulx
Hull—Aylmer	Caroline Brouard; 10,051; 23.08%	Marcel Proulx; 22,385; 51.40%	Michel Geisterfer; 3,639; 8.36%	Peter Piening; 1,521; 3.49%	Guy Dufort; 4,181; 9.60%	Rita Bouchard; 426; 0.98%	Ron Gray (NA); 184; 0.42%	Marcel Proulx
Hull—Aylmer	Caroline Brouard; 10,051; 23.08%	Marcel Proulx; 22,385; 51.40%	Michel Geisterfer; 3,639; 8.36%	Peter Piening; 1,521; 3.49%	Guy Dufort; 4,181; 9.60%	Rita Bouchard; 426; 0.98%	Alexandre Legeais (M-L); 106 0.24%	Marcel Proulx
Hull—Aylmer	Caroline Brouard; 10,051; 23.08%	Marcel Proulx; 22,385; 51.40%	Michel Geisterfer; 3,639; 8.36%	Peter Piening; 1,521; 3.49%	Guy Dufort; 4,181; 9.60%	Rita Bouchard; 426; 0.98%	Aubert Martins (Mar.); 892 2.05%	Marcel Proulx
Laurentides	Monique Guay; 30,337; 49.90%	Dominique Boyer; 23,619; 38.85%	William Azeff; 2,269; 3.73%	Brendan Naef; 720; 1.18%	Jacques Vien; 3,094; 5.09%	Jacinthe Millaire; 757; 1.25%		Monique Guay
Pontiac—Gatineau—Labelle	Johanne Deschamps; 14,552; 32.06%	Robert Bertrand; 20,590; 45.36%	Judith Grant; 6,587; 14.51%	Melissa Hunter; 840; 1.85%	Benoit Larocque; 1,791; 3.95%	Eleanor Hyodo; 184; 0.41%	Christian Legeais (M-L); 93 0.20%	Robert Bertrand
Pontiac—Gatineau—Labelle	Johanne Deschamps; 14,552; 32.06%	Robert Bertrand; 20,590; 45.36%	Judith Grant; 6,587; 14.51%	Melissa Hunter; 840; 1.85%	Benoit Larocque; 1,791; 3.95%	Eleanor Hyodo; 184; 0.41%	Thomas J. Sabourin (NA); 98 0.22%	Robert Bertrand
Pontiac—Gatineau—Labelle	Johanne Deschamps; 14,552; 32.06%	Robert Bertrand; 20,590; 45.36%	Judith Grant; 6,587; 14.51%	Melissa Hunter; 840; 1.85%	Benoit Larocque; 1,791; 3.95%	Eleanor Hyodo; 184; 0.41%	Gretchen Schwarz (Green); 654 1.44%	Robert Bertrand
Rivière-des-Mille-Îles	Gilles-A. Perron; 26,508; 49.41%	Robert Fragasso; 18,456; 34.40%	François Desrochers; 3,677; 6.85%	Stephane Thinel; 739; 1.38%	Jonathan Paquette; 2,935; 5.47%		Eric Squire (Green); 1,329; 2.48%	Gilles Perron; Saint-Eustache—Sainte-Thérèse
Témiscamingue	Pierre Brien; 18,801; 50.14%	Roch Charron; 16,028; 42.75%	Eric Larochelle; 1,368; 3.65%	Anik-Maude Morin; 493; 1.31%	Sébastien Héroux; 804; 2.14%			Pierre Brien
Terrebonne—Blainville	Diane Bourgeois; 28,933; 51.91%	François-Hugues Liberge; 17,668; 31.70%	Guylaine St-Georges; 3,741; 6.71%	Normand Beaudet; 1,111; 1.99%	Mélanie Gemme; 3,089; 5.54%	Pascale Levert; 1,193; 2.14%		Paul Mercier

== Ontario ==
=== Ottawa ===
Electoral district	Candidates								Incumbent
Electoral district	Liberal	Canadian Alliance	NDP	PC	Green	Marijuana	Natural Law	Other	Incumbent
Nepean—Carleton	David Pratt; 24,570; 41.16%	Michael Green; 22,310; 37.37%	Craig Parsons; 2,223; 3.72%	Bill Knott; 9,536; 15.98%	Isobel McGregor; 805; 1.35%		Lester Newby; 118; 0.20%	Jacques Waisvisz (CAP); 131; 0.22%	David Pratt
Ottawa Centre	Mac Harb; 22,716; 40.01%	David Brown; 10,167; 17.91%	Heather-jane Robertson; 13,516; 23.81%	Beverley Mitchell; 7,505; 13.22%	Chris Bradshaw; 1,531; 2.70%	Brad Powers; 813; 1.43%	**Neil Paterson**; 111; 0.20%	Mistahi Corkill (M-L); 66 0.12%	Mac Harb
Ottawa Centre	Mac Harb; 22,716; 40.01%	David Brown; 10,167; 17.91%	Heather-jane Robertson; 13,516; 23.81%	Beverley Mitchell; 7,505; 13.22%	Chris Bradshaw; 1,531; 2.70%	Brad Powers; 813; 1.43%	**Neil Paterson**; 111; 0.20%	Carla Marie Dancey (CAP); 210 0.37%	Mac Harb
Ottawa Centre	Mac Harb; 22,716; 40.01%	David Brown; 10,167; 17.91%	Heather-jane Robertson; 13,516; 23.81%	Beverley Mitchell; 7,505; 13.22%	Chris Bradshaw; 1,531; 2.70%	Brad Powers; 813; 1.43%	**Neil Paterson**; 111; 0.20%	Marvin Glass (Comm.); 139 0.24%	Mac Harb
Ottawa—Orléans	Eugène Bellemare; 26,635; 51.01%	Rita Burke; 13,316; 25.50%	Maureen Prebinski; 2,169; 4.15%	Marc-André Bélair; 8,738; 16.73%	Richard Warman; 561; 1.07%	John Albert; 534; 1.02%	Heather Hanson; 117; 0.22%	Louis Lang (M-L); 41 0.08%	Eugène Bellemare
Ottawa—Orléans	Eugène Bellemare; 26,635; 51.01%	Rita Burke; 13,316; 25.50%	Maureen Prebinski; 2,169; 4.15%	Marc-André Bélair; 8,738; 16.73%	Richard Warman; 561; 1.07%	John Albert; 534; 1.02%	Heather Hanson; 117; 0.22%	Jean Saintonge (CAP); 108 0.21%	Eugène Bellemare
Ottawa South	**John Manley**; 26,585; 51.33%	Brad Darbyson; 12,677; 24.48%	Jeannie Page; 3,463; 6.69%	Kevin Lister; 8,096; 15.63%		Ron Whalen; 679; 1.31%	James Hea; 141; 0.27%	Marsha Fine (M-L); 80 0.15%	**John Manley**
Ottawa South	**John Manley**; 26,585; 51.33%	Brad Darbyson; 12,677; 24.48%	Jeannie Page; 3,463; 6.69%	Kevin Lister; 8,096; 15.63%		Ron Whalen; 679; 1.31%	James Hea; 141; 0.27%	Mick Panesar (Comm.); 69 0.13%	**John Manley**
Ottawa—Vanier	Mauril Bélanger; 26,749; 55.56%	Nestor Gayowsky; 7,600; 15.79%	Joseph Zebrowski; 4,194; 8.71%	Stephen Woollcombe; 7,400; 15.37%	Adam Sommerfeld; 1,083; 2.25%	Raymond Turmel; 728; 1.51%	Pierrette Blondin; 187; 0.39%	Kim Roberge (M-L); 74 0.15%	Mauril Bélanger
Ottawa—Vanier	Mauril Bélanger; 26,749; 55.56%	Nestor Gayowsky; 7,600; 15.79%	Joseph Zebrowski; 4,194; 8.71%	Stephen Woollcombe; 7,400; 15.37%	Adam Sommerfeld; 1,083; 2.25%	Raymond Turmel; 728; 1.51%	Pierrette Blondin; 187; 0.39%	Raymond Samuéls (CAP); 126 0.26%	Mauril Bélanger
Ottawa West—Nepean	Marlene Catterall; 22,606; 43.32%	Barry Yeates; 14,753; 28.27%	Kevin Kinsella; 2,718; 5.21%	Tom Curran; 10,507; 20.13%	Matt Takach; 585; 1.12%	Sotos Petrides; 423; 0.81%	Richard Michael Wolfson; 58; 0.11%	David Creighton (CAP); 376 0.72%	Marlene Catterall
Ottawa West—Nepean	Marlene Catterall; 22,606; 43.32%	Barry Yeates; 14,753; 28.27%	Kevin Kinsella; 2,718; 5.21%	Tom Curran; 10,507; 20.13%	Matt Takach; 585; 1.12%	Sotos Petrides; 423; 0.81%	Richard Michael Wolfson; 58; 0.11%	Stuart Ryan (Comm.); 70 0.13%	Marlene Catterall
Ottawa West—Nepean	Marlene Catterall; 22,606; 43.32%	Barry Yeates; 14,753; 28.27%	Kevin Kinsella; 2,718; 5.21%	Tom Curran; 10,507; 20.13%	Matt Takach; 585; 1.12%	Sotos Petrides; 423; 0.81%	Richard Michael Wolfson; 58; 0.11%	John Turmel (Ind.); 89 0.17%	Marlene Catterall

=== Eastern Ontario ===
Electoral district	Candidates						Incumbent
Electoral district	Liberal	Canadian Alliance	NDP	PC	Canadian Action	Other	Incumbent
Glengarry—Prescott—Russell	Don Boudria; 31,371; 67.96%	L. Sebastian Anders; 8,632; 18.70%	Guy Belle-Isle; 1,877; 4.07%	Ashley O'Kurley; 3,942; 8.54%		Wayne Foster (NLP); 340; 0.74%	Don Boudria
Hastings—Frontenac—Lennox and Addington	Larry McCormick; 16,996; 39.00%	Sean McAdam; 13,227; 30.35%	Tom O'Neill; 2,200; 5.05%	Daryl Kramp; 10,231; 23.48%	Paul Isaacs; 156; 0.36%	Ross Baker (Ind.); 207 0.48%	Larry McCormick
Hastings—Frontenac—Lennox and Addington	Larry McCormick; 16,996; 39.00%	Sean McAdam; 13,227; 30.35%	Tom O'Neill; 2,200; 5.05%	Daryl Kramp; 10,231; 23.48%	Paul Isaacs; 156; 0.36%	Kenneth Switzer (NA); 43 0.10%	Larry McCormick
Hastings—Frontenac—Lennox and Addington	Larry McCormick; 16,996; 39.00%	Sean McAdam; 13,227; 30.35%	Tom O'Neill; 2,200; 5.05%	Daryl Kramp; 10,231; 23.48%	Paul Isaacs; 156; 0.36%	Chris Walker (Green); 516 1.18%	Larry McCormick
Kingston and the Islands	Peter Milliken; 26,457; 51.69%	Kevin Goligher; 7,904; 15.44%	Gary Wilson; 4,951; 9.67%	Blair MacLean; 9,222; 18.02%		Chris Milburn (Green); 2,652; 5.18%	Peter Milliken
Lanark—Carleton	Ian Murray; 22,811; 35.99%	Scott Reid; 24,670; 38.93%	Theresa Kiefer; 1,946; 3.07%	Bryan Brulotte; 12,430; 19.61%	Ross Elliott; 388; 0.61%	John Baranyi (Ind.); 150 0.24%	Ian Murray
Lanark—Carleton	Ian Murray; 22,811; 35.99%	Scott Reid; 24,670; 38.93%	Theresa Kiefer; 1,946; 3.07%	Bryan Brulotte; 12,430; 19.61%	Ross Elliott; 388; 0.61%	Stuart Langstaff (Green); 871 1.37%	Ian Murray
Lanark—Carleton	Ian Murray; 22,811; 35.99%	Scott Reid; 24,670; 38.93%	Theresa Kiefer; 1,946; 3.07%	Bryan Brulotte; 12,430; 19.61%	Ross Elliott; 388; 0.61%	Britt Roberts (NLP); 107 0.17%	Ian Murray
Leeds—Grenville	Joe Jordan; 18,594; 39.51%	Gord Brown; 18,539; 39.39%	Martin Hanratty; 990; 2.10%	John M. Johnston; 7,940; 16.87%	Jane Pamela Scharf; 181; 0.38%	Jerry Heath (Green); 816; 1.73%	Joe Jordan
Prince Edward—Hastings	**Lyle Vanclief**; 20,055; 50.46%	Jim Graham; 9,707; 24.43%	Jason Gannon; 1,897; 4.77%	Dennis Timbrell; 8,083; 20.34%			**Lyle Vanclief**
Renfrew—Nipissing—Pembroke	Hec Clouthier; 18,211; 39.00%	Cheryl Gallant; 20,634; 44.18%	Ole Hendrickson; 1,607; 3.44%	Bob Amaron; 5,287; 11.32%		André Giordano (NLP); 78 0.17%	Hec Clouthier
Renfrew—Nipissing—Pembroke	Hec Clouthier; 18,211; 39.00%	Cheryl Gallant; 20,634; 44.18%	Ole Hendrickson; 1,607; 3.44%	Bob Amaron; 5,287; 11.32%		Thane C. Heins (NA); 121 0.26%	Hec Clouthier
Renfrew—Nipissing—Pembroke	Hec Clouthier; 18,211; 39.00%	Cheryl Gallant; 20,634; 44.18%	Ole Hendrickson; 1,607; 3.44%	Bob Amaron; 5,287; 11.32%		Stanley E. Sambey (Mar.); 762 1.63%	Hec Clouthier
Stormont—Dundas— Charlottenburgh	Bob Kilger; 19,113; 46.69%	Guy Lauzon; 16,151; 39.45%	Kimberley Fry; 1,696; 4.14%	Michael Bailey; 3,635; 8.88%	Georges Elie Novy; 127; 0.31%	Ian Campbell (NLP); 214; 0.52%	Bob Kilger

=== Central Ontario ===
Electoral district	Candidates					Incumbent
Electoral district	Liberal	Canadian Alliance	NDP	PC	Other	Incumbent
Barrie—Simcoe—Bradford	Aileen Carroll; 26,309; 48.27%	Rob Hamilton; 17,600; 32.29%	Keith Lindsay; 2,385; 4.38%	Jane MacLaren; 7,588; 13.92%	Brian K. White (NA); 234 0.43%	Aileen Carroll
Barrie—Simcoe—Bradford	Aileen Carroll; 26,309; 48.27%	Rob Hamilton; 17,600; 32.29%	Keith Lindsay; 2,385; 4.38%	Jane MacLaren; 7,588; 13.92%	Ian Woods (CAP); 387 0.71%	Aileen Carroll
Bruce—Grey—Owen Sound	Ovid L. Jackson; 19,817; 44.22%	Murray Peer; 15,960; 35.61%	Karen Gventer; 2,166; 4.83%	Allen Wilford; 6,872; 15.33%		Ovid Jackson
Dufferin—Peel—Wellington—Grey	Murray Calder; 21,678; 45.57%	Don Crawford; 15,028; 31.59%	Mitchel Healey; 1,473; 3.10%	Richard Majkot; 7,926; 16.66%	Robert Strang (Green); 1,464; 3.08%	Murray Calder
Durham	Alex Shepherd; 20,602; 45.20%	Gerry Skipwith; 13,743; 30.15%	Ken Ranney; 2,545; 5.58%	Sam Cureatz; 8,367; 18.36%	Durk Bruinsma (NA); 326; 0.72%	Alex Shepherd
Haliburton—Victoria—Brock	John O'Reilly; 16,710; 33.95%	Pat Dunn; 15,591; 31.68%	Rick Denyer; 2,409; 4.89%	Laurie Scott; 14,508; 29.48%		John O'Reilly
Northumberland	Paul Harold Macklin; 20,109; 45.90%	Rick Norlock; 11,410; 26.05%	Ben Burd; 2,141; 4.89%	Ralph James Zarboni; 8,768; 20.02%	Tom Lawson (Green); 1,102 2.52%	Christine Stewart
Northumberland	Paul Harold Macklin; 20,109; 45.90%	Rick Norlock; 11,410; 26.05%	Ben Burd; 2,141; 4.89%	Ralph James Zarboni; 8,768; 20.02%	Gail Thompson (CAP); 276 0.63%	Christine Stewart
Peterborough	Peter Adams; 25,310; 48.41%	Eric John Allan Mann; 14,924; 28.54%	Herb Wiseman; 3,967; 7.59%	Darrin Langen; 7,034; 13.45%	Bob Bowers (Ind.); 147 0.28%	Peter Adams
Peterborough	Peter Adams; 25,310; 48.41%	Eric John Allan Mann; 14,924; 28.54%	Herb Wiseman; 3,967; 7.59%	Darrin Langen; 7,034; 13.45%	Tim Holland (Green); 903 1.73%	Peter Adams
Simcoe—Grey	Paul Bonwick; 22,224; 44.77%	George Demery; 16,113; 32.46%	Michael Kennedy; 1,646; 3.32%	Bill Dunkley; 8,655; 17.44%	Victor Carvalho (NA); 246 0.50%	Paul Bonwick
Simcoe—Grey	Paul Bonwick; 22,224; 44.77%	George Demery; 16,113; 32.46%	Michael Kennedy; 1,646; 3.32%	Bill Dunkley; 8,655; 17.44%	James Wilson McGillivray (CAP); 751 1.51%	Paul Bonwick
Simcoe North	Paul DeVillers; 24,510; 50.76%	Peter Stock; 14,283; 29.58%	Ann Billings; 2,272; 4.71%	Lucy Stewart; 6,914; 14.32%	Adrian P. Kooger (NA); 305; 0.63%	Paul Devillers
York North	Karen Kraft Sloan; 22,665; 46.50%	Bob Yaciuk; 11,985; 24.59%	Ian Scott; 1,696; 3.48%	Joe Wamback; 11,890; 24.39%	Ian Knight (NA); 509; 1.04%	Karen Kraft Sloan

=== Durham and York ===
Electoral district	Candidates					Incumbent
Electoral district	Liberal	Canadian Alliance	NDP	PC	Other	Incumbent
Markham	John McCallum; 32,104; 66.64%	Jim Jones; 9,015; 18.71%	Janice Hagan; 1,129; 2.34%	David Scrymgeour; 5,085; 10.55%	Akber Choudhry (Ind.); 222 0.46%	Jim Jones
Markham	John McCallum; 32,104; 66.64%	Jim Jones; 9,015; 18.71%	Janice Hagan; 1,129; 2.34%	David Scrymgeour; 5,085; 10.55%	Jim Conrad (CAP); 130 0.27%	Jim Jones
Markham	John McCallum; 32,104; 66.64%	Jim Jones; 9,015; 18.71%	Janice Hagan; 1,129; 2.34%	David Scrymgeour; 5,085; 10.55%	Bernadette Manning (Green); 493 1.02%	Jim Jones
Oak Ridges	Bryon Wilfert; 33,058; 59.41%	Bob Callow; 11,714; 21.05%	Joseph Thevarkunnel; 1,623; 2.92%	John Oostrom; 8,409; 15.11%	Steven Haylestrom (Green); 672 1.21%	Bryon Wilfert
Oak Ridges	Bryon Wilfert; 33,058; 59.41%	Bob Callow; 11,714; 21.05%	Joseph Thevarkunnel; 1,623; 2.92%	John Oostrom; 8,409; 15.11%	Mary Wan (NLP); 172 0.31%	Bryon Wilfert
Oshawa	Ivan Grose; 16,179; 42.92%	Barry Bussey; 10,863; 28.82%	Bruce Rogers; 4,203; 11.15%	Bruce L. Wright; 5,675; 15.05%	David Gershuny (M-L); 97 0.26%	Ivan Grose
Oshawa	Ivan Grose; 16,179; 42.92%	Barry Bussey; 10,863; 28.82%	Bruce Rogers; 4,203; 11.15%	Bruce L. Wright; 5,675; 15.05%	Craig James Michael McMillan (Mar.); 679 1.80%	Ivan Grose
Pickering—Ajax—Uxbridge	Dan McTeague; 28,834; 57.44%	Ken Griffith; 11,941; 23.79%	Ralph Chatoor; 1,523; 3.03%	Michael Hills; 6,883; 13.71%	Chris Pennington (Green); 1,014; 2.02%	Dan McTeague
Thornhill	Elinor Caplan; 27,152; 64.59%	Robert Goldin; 6,643; 15.80%	Nathan Rotman; 1,653; 3.93%	Lou Watson; 6,338; 15.08%	Art Jaszczyk (CAP); 254; 0.60%	Elinor Caplan
Vaughan—King—Aurora	Maurizio Bevilacqua; 38,208; 67.22%	Adrian Visentin; 9,757; 17.17%	Octavia Beckles; 1,938; 3.41%	Menotti Mazzuca; 6,551; 11.53%	Lesley Knight (NA); 384; 0.68%	Maurizio Bevilacqua
Whitby—Ajax	Judi Longfield; 25,693; 52.68%	Shaun Gillespie; 13,159; 26.98%	Vic Perroni; 2,359; 4.84%	Rob Chopowick; 7,563; 15.51%		Judi Longfield

=== Suburban Toronto ===
Electoral district	Candidates						Incumbent
Electoral district	Liberal	Canadian Alliance	NDP	PC	Marxist-Leninist	Other	Incumbent
Don Valley East	David Collenette; 25,915; 66.60%	Kasra Nejatian; 4,736; 12.17%	Ron Casey-Nestor; 2,249; 5.78%	Cecilia Fusco; 5,645; 14.51%	Judith Snow; 153; 0.39%	Ryan Kidd (NA); 212; 0.54%	**David Collenette**
Etobicoke Centre	Allan Rock; 26,083; 56.37%	Michael G. Craik; 10,318; 22.30%	Karen Dolan; 2,124; 4.59%	Ross Vaughan; 7,566; 16.35%	Dagmar Sullivan; 181; 0.39%		**Allan Rock**
Etobicoke—Lakeshore	Jean Augustine; 22,467; 51.78%	David Court; 9,160; 21.11%	Richard Joseph Banigan; 2,835; 6.53%	David Haslam; 8,453; 19.48%	Janice Murray; 116; 0.27%	Ed Bil (Comm.); 113 0.26%	Jean Augustine
Etobicoke—Lakeshore	Jean Augustine; 22,467; 51.78%	David Court; 9,160; 21.11%	Richard Joseph Banigan; 2,835; 6.53%	David Haslam; 8,453; 19.48%	Janice Murray; 116; 0.27%	Don Jackson (NLP); 244 0.56%	Jean Augustine
Etobicoke North	Roy Cullen; 23,345; 72.54%	Mahmood Elahi; 6,280; 19.51%	Ana Maria Sapp; 2,210; 6.87%			Elizabeth Rowley (Comm.); 347; 1.08%	Roy Cullen
Scarborough—Agincourt	Jim Karygiannis; 26,986; 70.89%	Andrew Faust; 5,100; 13.40%	Michael Laxer; 1,499; 3.94%	Bruce Elliott; 4,030; 10.59%	Sarah Thompson; 112; 0.29%	Wayne Cook (CAP); 341; 0.90%	Jim Karygiannis
Scarborough Centre	John Cannis; 26,969; 67.51%	Bill Settatree; 8,849; 22.15%	Ali Mallah; 3,171; 7.94%			Paul Coulbeck (Mar.); 959; 2.40%	John Cannis
Scarborough East	John McKay; 24,019; 59.82%	Paul Calandra; 7,559; 18.83%	Denise Lake; 1,884; 4.69%	W. Paul McCrossan; 6,284; 15.65%	France Tremblay; 113; 0.28%	Dave Glover (CAP); 292; 0.73%	John McKay
Scarborough—Rouge River	Derek Lee; 28,669; 79.05%	Kaizer Suleman; 3,237; 8.93%	Paulette Senior; 1,793; 4.94%	Alan Shumak; 2,566; 7.08%			Derek Lee
Scarborough Southwest	Tom Wappel; 21,466; 60.01%	Nabil El-Khazen; 4,912; 13.73%	Dan Harris; 3,638; 10.17%	Ellery Hollingsworth; 5,251; 14.68%		Walter Aolari (CAP); 336 0.94%	Tom Wappel
Scarborough Southwest	Tom Wappel; 21,466; 60.01%	Nabil El-Khazen; 4,912; 13.73%	Dan Harris; 3,638; 10.17%	Ellery Hollingsworth; 5,251; 14.68%		Dora Stewart (Comm.); 165 0.46%	Tom Wappel
Willowdale	Jim Peterson; 27,038; 61.27%	Kevyn Nightingale; 7,411; 16.79%	Yvonne Bobb; 2,404; 5.45%	Chungsen Leung; 7,134; 16.17%	Roger Carter; 145; 0.33%		**Jim Peterson**
York Centre	Art Eggleton; 24,788; 71.09%	Jeffrey Dorfman; 4,615; 13.24%	Maurice Coulter; 2,109; 6.05%	Mark Tweyman; 2,518; 7.22%	Diane Johnston; 142; 0.41%	Christopher Black (Comm.); 163 0.47%	**Art Eggleton**
York Centre	Art Eggleton; 24,788; 71.09%	Jeffrey Dorfman; 4,615; 13.24%	Maurice Coulter; 2,109; 6.05%	Mark Tweyman; 2,518; 7.22%	Diane Johnston; 142; 0.41%	Constantine Kritsonis (Green); 532 1.53%	**Art Eggleton**
York West	Judy Sgro; 19,768; 77.28%	Munish Chandra; 2,734; 10.69%	Julia McCrea; 2,365; 9.25%		Amarjit Dhillon; 175; 0.68%	G. Marcello Marchetti (Mar.); 539; 2.11%	Judy Sgro

=== Central Toronto ===
Electoral district	Candidates								Incumbent
Electoral district	Liberal	Canadian Alliance	NDP	PC	Green	Marijuana	Marxist-Leninist	Other	Incumbent
Beaches—East York	Maria Minna; 22,515; 52.74%	Abu Alam; 3,838; 8.99%	Mel Watkins; 8,936; 20.93%	Wayne Clutterbuck; 5,766; 13.51%	James Mendel; 599; 1.40%	Bruce Watson; 682; 1.60%	Steve Rutchinski; 53; 0.12%	Donalda Fredeen (NLP); 88 0.21%	Maria Minna
Beaches—East York	Maria Minna; 22,515; 52.74%	Abu Alam; 3,838; 8.99%	Mel Watkins; 8,936; 20.93%	Wayne Clutterbuck; 5,766; 13.51%	James Mendel; 599; 1.40%	Bruce Watson; 682; 1.60%	Steve Rutchinski; 53; 0.12%	Ann Nicholson (Comm.); 82 0.19%	Maria Minna
Beaches—East York	Maria Minna; 22,515; 52.74%	Abu Alam; 3,838; 8.99%	Mel Watkins; 8,936; 20.93%	Wayne Clutterbuck; 5,766; 13.51%	James Mendel; 599; 1.40%	Bruce Watson; 682; 1.60%	Steve Rutchinski; 53; 0.12%	Randall Whitcomb (CAP); 128 0.30%	Maria Minna
Davenport	Charles Caccia; 17,014; 66.72%	Anthony Montenegrino; 2,021; 7.93%	Jordan Berger; 3,457; 13.56%	Eduardo Marcos; 1,526; 5.98%	Mark O'Brien; 642; 2.52%	Elmer Gale; 480; 1.88%		Ann Emmett (CAP); 288 1.13%	Charles Caccia†
Davenport	Charles Caccia; 17,014; 66.72%	Anthony Montenegrino; 2,021; 7.93%	Jordan Berger; 3,457; 13.56%	Eduardo Marcos; 1,526; 5.98%	Mark O'Brien; 642; 2.52%	Elmer Gale; 480; 1.88%		Stephen Porter (NLP); 73 0.29%	Charles Caccia†
Don Valley West	John Godfrey; 25,329; 55.37%	John Wakelin; 7,239; 15.83%	Ali Naqvi; 2,024; 4.42%	Michael Murton; 10,583; 23.14%		Greg Stock; 469; 1.03%	Fernand Deschamps; 97; 0.21%		John Godfrey
Eglinton—Lawrence	**Joe Volpe**; 25,161; 60.68%	Joel Etienne; 5,497; 13.26%	Simon Rowland; 2,663; 6.42%	Louise Sankey; 7,156; 17.26%	Doug Howat; 688; 1.66%		Frank Chilelli; 164; 0.40%	Matthew Macleod (NLP); 133; 0.32%	**Joe Volpe**
Parkdale—High Park	Sarmite Bulte; 20,676; 49.41%	Vicki Vancas; 4,882; 11.67%	Paul Schmidt; 7,947; 18.99%	David Strycharz; 5,681; 13.58%	Neil Spiegel; 1,161; 2.77%	Terry Parker; 775; 1.85%	Lorne Gershuny; 122; 0.29%	Michel Dugré (NA); 132 0.32%	Sarmite Bulte
Parkdale—High Park	Sarmite Bulte; 20,676; 49.41%	Vicki Vancas; 4,882; 11.67%	Paul Schmidt; 7,947; 18.99%	David Strycharz; 5,681; 13.58%	Neil Spiegel; 1,161; 2.77%	Terry Parker; 775; 1.85%	Lorne Gershuny; 122; 0.29%	Greg Robertson (CAP); 317 0.76%	Sarmite Bulte
Parkdale—High Park	Sarmite Bulte; 20,676; 49.41%	Vicki Vancas; 4,882; 11.67%	Paul Schmidt; 7,947; 18.99%	David Strycharz; 5,681; 13.58%	Neil Spiegel; 1,161; 2.77%	Terry Parker; 775; 1.85%	Lorne Gershuny; 122; 0.29%	Wilfred Szczesny (Comm.); 155 0.37%	Sarmite Bulte
St. Paul's	**Carolyn Bennett**; 25,358; 54.01%	Theo Caldwell; 5,457; 11.62%	Guy Hunter; 4,451; 9.48%	Barry Cline; 10,099; 21.51%	Don Roebuck; 769; 1.64%	Andrew Potter; 514; 1.09%	Barbara Seed; 88; 0.19%	Ron Parker (NLP); 83 0.18%	**Carolyn Bennett**
St. Paul's	**Carolyn Bennett**; 25,358; 54.01%	Theo Caldwell; 5,457; 11.62%	Guy Hunter; 4,451; 9.48%	Barry Cline; 10,099; 21.51%	Don Roebuck; 769; 1.64%	Andrew Potter; 514; 1.09%	Barbara Seed; 88; 0.19%	Mark Till (CAP); 128 0.27%	**Carolyn Bennett**
Toronto Centre—Rosedale	**Bill Graham**; 26,203; 55.33%	Richard Walker; 5,058; 10.68%	David Berlin; 5,300; 11.19%	Randall Pearce; 8,149; 17.21%		Neev Tapiero; 722; 1.52%	Philip Fernandez; 116; 0.24%	Danny Goldstick (Comm.); 121 0.26%	**Bill Graham**
Toronto Centre—Rosedale	**Bill Graham**; 26,203; 55.33%	Richard Walker; 5,058; 10.68%	David Berlin; 5,300; 11.19%	Randall Pearce; 8,149; 17.21%		Neev Tapiero; 722; 1.52%	Philip Fernandez; 116; 0.24%	David Gordon (NLP); 224 0.47%	**Bill Graham**
Toronto Centre—Rosedale	**Bill Graham**; 26,203; 55.33%	Richard Walker; 5,058; 10.68%	David Berlin; 5,300; 11.19%	Randall Pearce; 8,149; 17.21%		Neev Tapiero; 722; 1.52%	Philip Fernandez; 116; 0.24%	Paul Hellyer (CAP); 1,466 3.10%	**Bill Graham**
Toronto—Danforth	Dennis Mills; 20,330; 51.90%	Chris Butryn; 3,021; 7.71%	Paula Turtle; 10,830; 27.65%	Rose A. Dyson; 3,138; 8.01%	Robert Nevin; 769; 1.96%	Sean Keir; 513; 1.31%	Melanie Cishecki; 82; 0.21%	**Miguel Figueroa** (Comm.); 129 0.33%	Dennis Mills
Toronto—Danforth	Dennis Mills; 20,330; 51.90%	Chris Butryn; 3,021; 7.71%	Paula Turtle; 10,830; 27.65%	Rose A. Dyson; 3,138; 8.01%	Robert Nevin; 769; 1.96%	Sean Keir; 513; 1.31%	Melanie Cishecki; 82; 0.21%	Linda Martin (NLP); 154 0.39%	Dennis Mills
Toronto—Danforth	Dennis Mills; 20,330; 51.90%	Chris Butryn; 3,021; 7.71%	Paula Turtle; 10,830; 27.65%	Rose A. Dyson; 3,138; 8.01%	Robert Nevin; 769; 1.96%	Sean Keir; 513; 1.31%	Melanie Cishecki; 82; 0.21%	William Angus Millar (CAP); 202 0.52%	Dennis Mills
Trinity—Spadina	Tony Ianno; 20,032; 47.56%	Lee Monaco; 2,250; 5.34%	Michael Valpy; 16,001; 37.99%	John E. Polko; 2,309; 5.48%	Matthew Hammond; 562; 1.33%	Paul Lewin; 673; 1.60%	Nick Lin; 102; 0.24%	Jesse Benjamin (Comm.); 90 0.21%	Tony Ianno
Trinity—Spadina	Tony Ianno; 20,032; 47.56%	Lee Monaco; 2,250; 5.34%	Michael Valpy; 16,001; 37.99%	John E. Polko; 2,309; 5.48%	Matthew Hammond; 562; 1.33%	Paul Lewin; 673; 1.60%	Nick Lin; 102; 0.24%	Ashley Deans (NLP); 98 0.23%	Tony Ianno
York South—Weston	Alan Tonks; 15,841; 45.60%	Dan Houssar; 1,754; 5.05%	Tom Parkin; 1,288; 3.71%	Jason Daniel Baker; 986; 2.84%	Denis Calnan; 293; 0.84%		Anna Dicarlo; 102; 0.29%	Hassan Husseini (Comm.); 130 0.37%	John Nunziata
York South—Weston	Alan Tonks; 15,841; 45.60%	Dan Houssar; 1,754; 5.05%	Tom Parkin; 1,288; 3.71%	Jason Daniel Baker; 986; 2.84%	Denis Calnan; 293; 0.84%		Anna Dicarlo; 102; 0.29%	John Nunziata (NA); 14,344 41.29%	John Nunziata

=== Brampton, Mississauga and Oakville ===
Electoral district	Candidates							Incumbent
Electoral district	Liberal	Canadian Alliance	NDP	PC	Green	Marxist-Leninist	Other	Incumbent
Bramalea—Gore—Malton—Springdale	Gurbax S. Malhi; 21,917; 57.05%	Gurdish Mangat; 7,214; 18.78%	Vishnu Roche; 1,864; 4.85%	Danny Varaich; 6,019; 15.67%		David Greig; 269; 0.70%	Jim Bridgewood (Comm.); 350 0.91%	Gurbax Malhi
Bramalea—Gore—Malton—Springdale	Gurbax S. Malhi; 21,917; 57.05%	Gurdish Mangat; 7,214; 18.78%	Vishnu Roche; 1,864; 4.85%	Danny Varaich; 6,019; 15.67%		David Greig; 269; 0.70%	Gurinder Malhi (Ind.); 783 2.04%	Gurbax Malhi
Brampton Centre	Sarkis Assadourian; 18,365; 50.64%	Prabhat Kapur; 6,247; 17.23%	Sue Slean; 1,795; 4.95%	Beryl Ford; 9,229; 25.45%	Andrew K. Roy; 628; 1.73%			Sarkis Assadourian
Brampton West—Mississauga	Colleen Beaumier; 31,041; 66.38%	Hardial Sangha; 7,666; 16.39%	Matt Harsant; 1,567; 3.35%	W. Glenn Harewood; 5,957; 12.74%	Mike Hofer; 529; 1.13%			Colleen Beaumier
Mississauga Centre	Carolyn Parrish; 24,381; 64.13%	Harry Dhaliwal; 6,643; 17.47%	Gail McCabe; 1,404; 3.69%	Nina Tangri; 5,077; 13.35%		Bob McCabe; 125; 0.33%	Alan Ward (Mar.); 389; 1.02%	Carolyn Parrish
Mississauga East	Albina Guarnieri; 22,158; 64.50%	Jainstien Dookie; 5,372; 15.64%	Henry Beer; 1,451; 4.22%	Riina DeFaria; 5,144; 14.97%		Pierre Chénier; 227; 0.66%		Albina Guarnieri
Mississauga South	Paul Szabo; 20,676; 51.77%	Brad Butt; 10,139; 25.39%	Ken Cole; 1,636; 4.10%	David Brown; 6,903; 17.28%	Pamela Murray; 516; 1.29%	Tim Sullivan; 67; 0.17%		Paul Szabo
Mississauga West	Steve Mahoney; 31,260; 63.20%	Philip Leong; 10,582; 21.40%	Cynthia Kazadi; 1,532; 3.10%	Gul Nawaz; 5,275; 10.67%	Carolyn Brown; 810; 1.64%			Steve Mahoney
Oakville	M.A. Bonnie Brown; 23,074; 47.74%	Dan Ferrone; 13,544; 28.02%	Willie Lambert; 1,335; 2.76%	Rick Byers; 9,589; 19.84%	David deBelle; 790; 1.63%			Bonnie Brown

=== Hamilton, Burlington and Niagara ===
Electoral district	Candidates							Incumbent
Electoral district	Liberal	Canadian Alliance	NDP	PC	Marxist-Leninist	Natural Law	Other	Incumbent
Ancaster—Dundas— Flamborough—Aldershot	John Bryden; 19,921; 41.16%	Ray Pennings; 15,272; 31.55%	Gordon Guyatt; 3,756; 7.76%	Gerry Aggus; 9,451; 19.53%				John Bryden
Burlington	Paddy Torsney; 22,175; 46.77%	Don Pennell; 11,500; 24.26%	Larry McMahon; 1,722; 3.63%	Stephen Collinson; 11,240; 23.71%			Tom Snyder (Green); 771; 1.63%	Paddy Torsney
Erie—Lincoln	John Maloney; 17,054; 42.21%	Dean Allison; 14,992; 37.11%	Jody Di Bartolomeo; 2,423; 6.00%	David Hurren; 5,174; 12.81%		John Gregory; 143; 0.35%	David W. Bylsma (NA); 476 1.18%	John Maloney
Erie—Lincoln	John Maloney; 17,054; 42.21%	Dean Allison; 14,992; 37.11%	Jody Di Bartolomeo; 2,423; 6.00%	David Hurren; 5,174; 12.81%		John Gregory; 143; 0.35%	William Schleich (CAP); 137 0.34%	John Maloney
Hamilton East	Sheila Copps; 16,435; 52.85%	Joshua Conroy; 6,039; 19.42%	Jim Stevenson; 4,111; 13.22%	Steven Knight; 3,321; 10.68%	Julie Gordon; 105; 0.34%	Helene Darisse-Yildirim; 97; 0.31%	Michael Baldasaro (Mar.); 575 1.85%	Sheila Copps
Hamilton East	Sheila Copps; 16,435; 52.85%	Joshua Conroy; 6,039; 19.42%	Jim Stevenson; 4,111; 13.22%	Steven Knight; 3,321; 10.68%	Julie Gordon; 105; 0.34%	Helene Darisse-Yildirim; 97; 0.31%	Salvatore Sam Cino (Ind.); 270 0.87%	Sheila Copps
Hamilton East	Sheila Copps; 16,435; 52.85%	Joshua Conroy; 6,039; 19.42%	Jim Stevenson; 4,111; 13.22%	Steven Knight; 3,321; 10.68%	Julie Gordon; 105; 0.34%	Helene Darisse-Yildirim; 97; 0.31%	Bob Mann (Comm.); 144 0.46%	Sheila Copps
Hamilton Mountain	Beth Phinney; 22,536; 50.91%	Mike Scott; 9,621; 21.73%	James Stephenson; 4,387; 9.91%	John Smith; 7,467; 16.87%	Rolf Gerstenberger; 259; 0.59%			Beth Phinney
Hamilton West	Stan Keyes; 21,273; 52.72%	Leon O'Connor; 7,295; 18.08%	Catherine Hudson; 5,300; 13.13%	Ron Blackie; 5,024; 12.45%	Wendell Fields; 61; 0.15%	Rita Rassenberg; 94; 0.23%	Hamish Jamie Campbell (Green); 616 1.53%	Stan Keyes
Hamilton West	Stan Keyes; 21,273; 52.72%	Leon O'Connor; 7,295; 18.08%	Catherine Hudson; 5,300; 13.13%	Ron Blackie; 5,024; 12.45%	Wendell Fields; 61; 0.15%	Rita Rassenberg; 94; 0.23%	Stephen Downey (NA); 163 0.40%	Stan Keyes
Hamilton West	Stan Keyes; 21,273; 52.72%	Leon O'Connor; 7,295; 18.08%	Catherine Hudson; 5,300; 13.13%	Ron Blackie; 5,024; 12.45%	Wendell Fields; 61; 0.15%	Rita Rassenberg; 94; 0.23%	Danielle Keir (Mar.); 437 1.08%	Stan Keyes
Hamilton West	Stan Keyes; 21,273; 52.72%	Leon O'Connor; 7,295; 18.08%	Catherine Hudson; 5,300; 13.13%	Ron Blackie; 5,024; 12.45%	Wendell Fields; 61; 0.15%	Rita Rassenberg; 94; 0.23%	Mike Mirza (Comm.); 91 0.23%	Stan Keyes
Niagara Centre	Tony Tirabassi; 21,641; 45.74%	Bernie Law; 13,313; 28.14%	Mike Grimaldi; 7,029; 14.86%	Joe Atkinson; 4,893; 10.34%	Ron Walker; 149; 0.31%		Tom Prue (CAP); 290; 0.61%	Gilbert Parent†
Niagara Falls	Gary Pillitteri; 17,907; 45.92%	Mel Grunstein; 11,999; 30.77%	Ed Booker; 2,356; 6.04%	Tony Baldinelli; 6,077; 15.58%		William Norman Amos; 155; 0.40%	Clara Tarnoy (Green); 501; 1.28%	Gary Pillitteri
St. Catharines	Walt Lastewka; 20,992; 44.93%	Randy Taylor Dumont; 15,871; 33.97%	John Bacher; 2,878; 6.16%	Ken Atkinson; 6,522; 13.96%	Elaine Couto; 93; 0.20%	Jim Morris; 203; 0.43%	Tilly Bylsma (NA); 166; 0.36%	Walt Lastewka
Stoney Creek	Tony Valeri; 24,150; 51.08%	Doug Conley; 13,354; 28.25%	Mark Davies; 3,083; 6.52%	Grant Howell; 6,102; 12.91%	Paul Lane; 137; 0.29%		Phil Rose (CAP); 450; 0.95%	Tony Valeri

=== Midwestern Ontario ===
Electoral district	Candidates							Incumbent
Electoral district	Liberal	Canadian Alliance	NDP	PC	Green	Canadian Action	Other	Incumbent
Brant	Jane Stewart; 24,068; 56.42%	Chris Cattle; 10,955; 25.68%	Dee Chisholm; 3,126; 7.33%	Stephen Kun; 3,580; 8.39%	Graeme Dunn; 484; 1.13%	Mike Clancy; 447; 1.05%		Jane Stewart
Cambridge	Janko Peric; 22,148; 46.60%	Reg Petersen; 14,915; 31.38%	Pam Wolf; 4,111; 8.65%	John L. Housser; 5,988; 12.60%			John G. Gots (NA); 160 0.34%	Janko Peric
Cambridge	Janko Peric; 22,148; 46.60%	Reg Petersen; 14,915; 31.38%	Pam Wolf; 4,111; 8.65%	John L. Housser; 5,988; 12.60%			Thomas Mitchell (NLP); 210 0.44%	Janko Peric
Guelph—Wellington	Brenda Chamberlain; 26,440; 48.19%	Max Layton; 11,037; 20.12%	Edward Pickersgill; 5,685; 10.36%	Marie Adsett; 10,188; 18.57%	Bill Hulet; 966; 1.76%	Sharon Tanti; 207; 0.38%	Manuel Couto (M-L); 68 0.12%	Brenda Chamberlain
Guelph—Wellington	Brenda Chamberlain; 26,440; 48.19%	Max Layton; 11,037; 20.12%	Edward Pickersgill; 5,685; 10.36%	Marie Adsett; 10,188; 18.57%	Bill Hulet; 966; 1.76%	Sharon Tanti; 207; 0.38%	Gord Truscott (NA); 275 0.50%	Brenda Chamberlain
Haldimand—Norfolk—Brant	Bob Speller; 20,867; 46.82%	Jim Maki; 15,416; 34.59%	Norm Walpole; 2,124; 4.77%	Gary Muntz; 5,761; 12.93%		L. Scott Morgan; 397; 0.89%		Bob Speller
Halton	Julian Reed; 28,168; 47.27%	Tim Dobson; 15,656; 26.27%	Brenda Dolling; 2,633; 4.42%	Tom Kilmer; 12,114; 20.33%	Tom Adams; 1,018; 1.71%			Julian Reed
Huron—Bruce	Paul Steckle; 21,547; 49.91%	Mark Beaven; 10,343; 23.96%	Christine Kemp; 2,669; 6.18%	Ken Kelly; 8,138; 18.85%		Philip Holley; 225; 0.52%	Dave Joslin (NA); 249; 0.58%	Paul Steckle
Kitchener Centre	Karen Redman; 23,511; 52.84%	Eloise Jantzi; 11,603; 26.08%	Paul Royston; 3,058; 6.87%	Steven Daniel Gadbois; 6,162; 13.85%			Martin Suter (Comm.); 158; 0.36%	Karen Redman
Kitchener—Waterloo	Andrew Telegdi; 27,132; 50.34%	Joshua Doig; 12,402; 23.01%	Richard Walsh-Bowers; 4,394; 8.15%	Brian Bourke; 8,621; 15.99%	Jack MacAulay; 809; 1.50%	Robert E. Cormier; 273; 0.51%	Frank Ellis (NA); 105 0.19%	Andrew Telegdi
Kitchener—Waterloo	Andrew Telegdi; 27,132; 50.34%	Joshua Doig; 12,402; 23.01%	Richard Walsh-Bowers; 4,394; 8.15%	Brian Bourke; 8,621; 15.99%	Jack MacAulay; 809; 1.50%	Robert E. Cormier; 273; 0.51%	Christine Nugent (M-L); 164 0.30%	Andrew Telegdi
Oxford	John Finlay; 15,181; 35.55%	Patricia Smith; 11,455; 26.82%	Shawn Rouse; 2,254; 5.28%	Dave MacKenzie; 13,050; 30.56%		Alex Kreider; 227; 0.53%	John Thomas Markus (NA); 536; 1.26%	John Baird Finlay
Perth—Middlesex	John Alexander Richardson; 16,988; 40.37%	Garnet Bloomfield; 9,785; 23.26%	Sam Dinicol; 2,800; 6.65%	Gary Schellenberger; 11,545; 27.44%	Eric Eberhardt; 689; 1.64%	Larry Carruthers; 128; 0.30%	Tom Kroesbergen (NA); 141; 0.34%	John Richardson
Waterloo—Wellington	Lynn Myers; 19,619; 43.66%	John Reimer; 14,797; 32.93%	Allan Douglas Strong; 1,845; 4.11%	Michael Chong; 7,999; 17.80%	Brent A. Bouteiller; 432; 0.96%		Peter Ellis (NA); 249; 0.55%	Lynn Myers

=== Southwestern Ontario ===
Electoral district	Candidates							Incumbent
Electoral district	Liberal	Canadian Alliance	NDP	PC	Green	Marxist-Leninist	Other	Incumbent
Chatham-Kent—Essex	Jerry Pickard; 20,085; 49.71%	Sean Smart; 12,957; 32.07%	Susan MacKay; 2,209; 5.47%	Ryan Bailey; 4,156; 10.29%	Bobby Clarke; 715; 1.77%		Louis Duke (NA); 73 0.18%	Jerry Pickard
Chatham-Kent—Essex	Jerry Pickard; 20,085; 49.71%	Sean Smart; 12,957; 32.07%	Susan MacKay; 2,209; 5.47%	Ryan Bailey; 4,156; 10.29%	Bobby Clarke; 715; 1.77%		Dudley Smith (CAP); 213 0.53%	Jerry Pickard
Elgin—Middlesex—London	Gar Knutson; 17,202; 41.02%	Bill Walters; 15,496; 36.95%	Tim McCallum; 2,319; 5.53%	Delia Reiche; 6,080; 14.50%	John R. Fisher; 431; 1.03%		Ken DeVries (NA); 407; 0.97%	Gar Knutson
Essex	Susan Whelan; 20,524; 44.33%	Scott Cowan; 16,019; 34.60%	Marion Overholt; 6,431; 13.89%	Merrill Baker; 3,175; 6.86%		Robert Cruise; 152; 0.33%		Susan Whelan
Lambton—Kent—Middlesex	Rose-Marie Ur; 21,124; 48.95%	Ron Young; 13,302; 30.83%	Joyce Jolliffe; 1,871; 4.34%	John Phair; 5,918; 13.71%	Dan Valkos; 341; 0.79%		Eva Cryderman (CAP); 232 0.54%	Rose-Marie Ur
Lambton—Kent—Middlesex	Rose-Marie Ur; 21,124; 48.95%	Ron Young; 13,302; 30.83%	Joyce Jolliffe; 1,871; 4.34%	John Phair; 5,918; 13.71%	Dan Valkos; 341; 0.79%		Roger James (NA); 365 0.85%	Rose-Marie Ur
London—Fanshawe	Pat O'Brien; 19,677; 54.81%	Robert Vaughan; 7,998; 22.28%	Andrew Sadler; 4,107; 11.44%	Derrall Bellaire; 4,119; 11.47%				Pat O'Brien
London North Centre	Joe Fontana; 22,795; 51.46%	Nancy Branscombe; 9,062; 20.46%	Colleen Redmond; 3,936; 8.89%	Lorie Johnson; 7,305; 16.49%	Jeremy McNaughton; 681; 1.54%	Albert Smith; 65; 0.15%	Tim Berg (Mar.); 453; 1.02%	Joe Fontana
London West	Sue Barnes; 23,794; 49.37%	Salim Mansur; 10,162; 21.09%	George Goodlet; 3,596; 7.46%	Jeff Lang; 9,788; 20.31%	Jeremy Price; 614; 1.27%	Margaret Villamizar; 80; 0.17%	Richard Goos (CAP); 161; 0.33%	Sue Barnes
Sarnia—Lambton	Roger Gallaway; 19,329; 50.97%	Dave Christie; 11,208; 29.56%	Glenn Sonier; 2,735; 7.21%	Paul Bailey; 3,320; 8.76%	Allan McKeown; 514; 1.36%	Andre C. Vachon; 32; 0.08%	Ed Banninga (NA); 356 0.94%	Roger Gallaway
Sarnia—Lambton	Roger Gallaway; 19,329; 50.97%	Dave Christie; 11,208; 29.56%	Glenn Sonier; 2,735; 7.21%	Paul Bailey; 3,320; 8.76%	Allan McKeown; 514; 1.36%	Andre C. Vachon; 32; 0.08%	Shannon Bourke (NLP); 92 0.24%	Roger Gallaway
Sarnia—Lambton	Roger Gallaway; 19,329; 50.97%	Dave Christie; 11,208; 29.56%	Glenn Sonier; 2,735; 7.21%	Paul Bailey; 3,320; 8.76%	Allan McKeown; 514; 1.36%	Andre C. Vachon; 32; 0.08%	John Elliott (Ind.); 189 0.50%	Roger Gallaway
Sarnia—Lambton	Roger Gallaway; 19,329; 50.97%	Dave Christie; 11,208; 29.56%	Glenn Sonier; 2,735; 7.21%	Paul Bailey; 3,320; 8.76%	Allan McKeown; 514; 1.36%	Andre C. Vachon; 32; 0.08%	Rene Phillion (CAP); 145 0.38%	Roger Gallaway
Windsor—St. Clair	Rick Limoges; 16,600; 39.87%	Phillip Pettinato; 5,639; 13.55%	Joe Comartin; 17,001; 40.84%	Bruck Easton; 1,906; 4.58%	Stephen Lockwood; 390; 0.94%	Dale Woodyard; 95; 0.23%		Rick Limoges
Windsor West	Herb Gray; 20,729; 54.21%	Jeff Watson; 8,777; 22.96%	John McGinlay; 6,080; 15.90%	Ian West; 2,116; 5.53%		Enver Villamizar; 229; 0.60%	Christopher Soda (Ind.); 304; 0.80%	Herb Gray

=== Northern Ontario ===
Electoral district	Candidates						Incumbent
Electoral district	Liberal	Canadian Alliance	NDP	PC	Green	Other	Incumbent
Algoma—Manitoulin	Brent St. Denis; 15,000; 48.36%	Ron Swain; 8,992; 28.99%	Grant Buck; 4,326; 13.95%	Dale Lapham; 2,269; 7.32%	Alexander Jablanczy; 428; 1.38%		Brent St. Denis
Kenora—Rainy River	Bob Nault; 14,416; 45.21%	Ed Prefontaine; 9,125; 28.62%	Susan Barclay; 6,868; 21.54%	Brian Barrett; 1,476; 4.63%			Bob Nault
Nickel Belt	Raymond Bonin; 19,187; 55.57%	Neil Martin; 6,370; 18.45%	Sandy Bass; 7,304; 21.16%	Reg Couldridge; 1,664; 4.82%			Raymond Bonin
Nipissing	Bob Wood; 18,888; 57.04%	Ken Ferron; 7,461; 22.53%	Wendy Young; 2,572; 7.77%	Alan Dayes; 4,192; 12.66%			Bob Wood
Parry Sound-Muskoka	Andy Mitchell; 17,911; 47.52%	George Stripe; 9,569; 25.39%	Joanne Bury; 1,665; 4.42%	Keith Montgomery; 7,055; 18.72%	Richard Thomas; 1,495; 3.97%		Andy Mitchell
Sault Ste. Marie	Carmen F. Provenzano; 18,867; 50.79%	David Ronald Rose; 7,006; 18.86%	Bud Wildman; 9,202; 24.77%	Doug Lawson; 1,168; 3.14%	Kathie Brosemer; 776; 2.09%	Martin Bruce Odber (CAP); 128; 0.34%	Carmen Provenzano
Sudbury	Diane Marleau; 20,290; 58.52%	Mike Smith; 6,554; 18.90%	Paul Chislett; 4,368; 12.60%	Alex McGregor; 2,642; 7.62%	Thomas Gerry; 503; 1.45%	Daryl Janet Shandro (Comm.); 98 0.28%	Diane Marleau
Sudbury	Diane Marleau; 20,290; 58.52%	Mike Smith; 6,554; 18.90%	Paul Chislett; 4,368; 12.60%	Alex McGregor; 2,642; 7.62%	Thomas Gerry; 503; 1.45%	Kathy Wells-McNeil (CAP); 215 0.62%	Diane Marleau
Thunder Bay—Atikokan	Stan Dromisky; 11,449; 36.98%	David Richard Leskowski; 9,067; 29.29%	Rick Baker; 6,023; 19.45%	Ian M. Sinclair; 3,652; 11.80%	Kristin Boyer; 769; 2.48%		Stan Dromisky
Thunder Bay— Superior North	Joe Comuzzi; 15,241; 48.12%	Doug Pantry; 6,278; 19.82%	John Rafferty; 6,169; 19.48%	Richard Neumann; 2,753; 8.69%	Carl Rose; 648; 2.05%	Denis A. Carrière (Mar.); 581; 1.83%	Joe Comuzzi
Timiskaming—Cochrane	Ben Serré; 19,404; 62.40%	Dan Louie; 5,840; 18.78%	Ambrose Raftis; 2,461; 7.91%	William J. Stairs; 2,603; 8.37%	Joseph Gold; 790; 2.54%		Benoit Serré
Timmins— James Bay	Réginald Bélair; 16,335; 54.22%	James Gibb; 3,356; 11.14%	Len Wood; 9,385; 31.15%	Daniel Clark; 1,053; 3.49%			Réginald Bélair

== Manitoba ==
=== Rural Manitoba ===
Electoral district	Candidates					Incumbent
Electoral district	Liberal	Canadian Alliance	NDP	PC	Other	Incumbent
Brandon—Souris	Dick Scott; 6,544; 17.86%	Gary Nestibo; 11,678; 31.87%	Errol Black; 4,518; 12.33%	Rick Borotsik; 13,707; 37.41%	Colin G. Atkins (NA); 94 0.26%	Rick Borotsik
Brandon—Souris	Dick Scott; 6,544; 17.86%	Gary Nestibo; 11,678; 31.87%	Errol Black; 4,518; 12.33%	Rick Borotsik; 13,707; 37.41%	Lisa Gallagher (Comm.); 102 0.28%	Rick Borotsik
Churchill	Elijah Harper; 7,514; 32.23%	Jason Shaw; 4,126; 17.70%	Bev Desjarlais; 10,477; 44.94%	Doreen Murray; 1,198; 5.14%		Bev Desjarlais
Dauphin—Swan River	Jane Dawson; 7,091; 21.32%	Inky Mark; 15,855; 47.66%	Wayne Kines; 5,813; 17.47%	Keith Eliasson; 3,946; 11.86%	Terry Drul (CAP); 372 1.12%	Inky Mark
Dauphin—Swan River	Jane Dawson; 7,091; 21.32%	Inky Mark; 15,855; 47.66%	Wayne Kines; 5,813; 17.47%	Keith Eliasson; 3,946; 11.86%	Iris Yawney (NA); 189 0.57%	Inky Mark
Portage—Lisgar	Gerry J.E. Gebler; 6,133; 17.82%	Brian William Pallister; 17,318; 50.31%	Diane Beresford; 2,073; 6.02%	Morley McDonald; 5,339; 15.51%	E. Jake Hoeppner (Ind.); 3,558; 10.34%	Jake Hoeppner
Provencher	David Iftody; 14,419; 35.62%	Vic Toews; 21,358; 52.76%	Peter Hiebert; 1,980; 4.89%	Henry C. Dyck; 2,726; 6.73%		David Iftody
Selkirk—Interlake	Kathy Arnason; 9,612; 23.59%	Howard Hilstrom; 17,856; 43.82%	Paul Pododworny; 8,113; 19.91%	Tom Goodman; 4,992; 12.25%	Anthony Barendregt (NA); 178; 0.44%	Howard Hilstrom

=== Winnipeg ===
Electoral district	Candidates						Incumbent
Electoral district	Liberal	Canadian Alliance	NDP	PC	Communist	Other	Incumbent
Charleswood—St. James—Assiniboia	John Harvard; 13,901; 36.21%	Cyril McFate; 11,569; 30.14%	Dennis Kshyk; 2,786; 7.26%	Curtis Moore; 9,991; 26.03%	Greg Crowe; 138; 0.36%		John Harvard
Saint Boniface	Ronald J. Duhamel; 20,173; 52.17%	Joyce M. Chilton; 8,962; 23.18%	John Parry; 5,026; 13.00%	Mike Reilly; 4,505; 11.65%			Ron Duhamel
Winnipeg Centre	Kevin Lamoureux; 9,310; 34.11%	Reg Smith; 3,975; 14.56%	Pat Martin; 11,263; 41.26%	Michel Allard; 1,915; 7.02%	Harold Dyck; 134; 0.49%	Mikel Magnusson (Green); 698; 2.56%	Pat Martin
Winnipeg North Centre	Mary Richard; 6,755; 27.47%		Judy Wasylycia-Leis; 14,356; 58.39%	Myron Troniak; 2,950; 12.00%	Darrell Rankin; 525; 2.14%		Judy Wasylycia-Leis
Winnipeg North—St. Paul	Rey D. Pagtakhan; 14,556; 38.78%	Trevor Sprague; 11,412; 30.40%	Roman Yereniuk; 7,931; 21.13%	Dave Vust; 2,959; 7.88%	Paul Sidon; 110; 0.29%	Cynthia Cooke (CAP); 208 0.55%	Rey Pagtakhan
Winnipeg North—St. Paul	Rey D. Pagtakhan; 14,556; 38.78%	Trevor Sprague; 11,412; 30.40%	Roman Yereniuk; 7,931; 21.13%	Dave Vust; 2,959; 7.88%	Paul Sidon; 110; 0.29%	Georgina Rhéaume (Green); 232 0.62%	Rey Pagtakhan
Winnipeg North—St. Paul	Rey D. Pagtakhan; 14,556; 38.78%	Trevor Sprague; 11,412; 30.40%	Roman Yereniuk; 7,931; 21.13%	Dave Vust; 2,959; 7.88%	Paul Sidon; 110; 0.29%	Eric Truijen (NA); 126 0.34%	Rey Pagtakhan
Winnipeg South	Reg Alcock; 21,433; 50.94%	Bill Hancock; 12,638; 30.04%	Duane Nicol; 4,224; 10.04%	Geoffrey Lambert; 3,599; 8.55%		Didz Zuzens (Ind.); 183; 0.43%	Reg Alcock
Winnipeg South Centre	Anita Neville; 15,231; 40.46%	Betty Granger; 3,210; 8.53%	James Allum; 7,501; 19.93%	David Newman; 10,675; 28.36%	David Allison; 181; 0.48%	Chris Buors (Mar.); 640 1.70%	Lloyd Axworthy†
Winnipeg South Centre	Anita Neville; 15,231; 40.46%	Betty Granger; 3,210; 8.53%	James Allum; 7,501; 19.93%	David Newman; 10,675; 28.36%	David Allison; 181; 0.48%	Magnus Thompson (CAP); 202 0.54%	Lloyd Axworthy†
Winnipeg—Transcona	Bret Dobbin; 6,041; 18.43%	Shawn Rattai; 8,336; 25.44%	Bill Blaikie; 15,680; 47.85%	Chris Brewer; 2,133; 6.51%	James Hogaboam; 87; 0.27%	Theresa Ducharme (Ind.); 118 0.36%	Bill Blaikie
Winnipeg—Transcona	Bret Dobbin; 6,041; 18.43%	Shawn Rattai; 8,336; 25.44%	Bill Blaikie; 15,680; 47.85%	Chris Brewer; 2,133; 6.51%	James Hogaboam; 87; 0.27%	C. David Nickarz (Green); 229 0.70%	Bill Blaikie
Winnipeg—Transcona	Bret Dobbin; 6,041; 18.43%	Shawn Rattai; 8,336; 25.44%	Bill Blaikie; 15,680; 47.85%	Chris Brewer; 2,133; 6.51%	James Hogaboam; 87; 0.27%	Robert Scott (NA); 146 0.45%	Bill Blaikie

== Saskatchewan ==
=== Southern Saskatchewan ===
Electoral district	Candidates					Incumbent
Electoral district	Liberal	Canadian Alliance	NDP	PC	Canadian Action	Incumbent
Cypress Hills—Grasslands	Marlin Bryce Belt; 3,791; 12.57%	David Anderson; 18,593; 61.65%	Keith Murch; 5,101; 16.91%	William Caton; 2,676; 8.87%		Lee Morrison†
Palliser	Garry Johnson; 6,492; 20.41%	Don Findlay; 11,927; 37.50%	Dick Proctor; 12,136; 38.16%	Brent Shirkey; 1,248; 3.92%		Dick Proctor
Regina—Lumsden—Lake Centre	Hem Juttla; 4,296; 14.66%	Larry Spencer; 12,585; 42.94%	John Solomon; 12,424; 42.40%			John Solomon
Regina—Qu'Appelle	Melvin Isnana; 5,106; 17.98%	Don Leier; 11,567; 40.72%	Lorne Nystrom; 11,731; 41.30%			Lorne Nystrom
Souris—Moose Mountain	Myles Fuchs; 4,371; 14.35%	Roy H. Bailey; 19,278; 63.28%	Tom Cameron; 4,755; 15.61%	Larry Gabruch; 2,060; 6.76%		Roy Bailey
Wascana	Ralph Goodale; 14,244; 41.19%	James Rybchuk; 12,492; 36.12%	Garth Ormiston; 7,446; 21.53%		Wayne Gilmer; 401; 1.16%	Ralph Goodale
Yorkton—Melville	Ken Pilon; 5,153; 16.24%	Garry Breitkreuz; 19,978; 62.98%	Peter Champagne; 5,007; 15.78%	Brent Haas; 1,583; 4.99%		Garry Breitkreuz

=== Northern Saskatchewan ===
Electoral district	Candidates						Incumbent
Electoral district	Liberal	Canadian Alliance	NDP	PC	Green	Canadian Action	Incumbent
Battlefords—Lloydminster	Peter Frey; 5,098; 17.36%	Gerry Ritz; 17,691; 60.23%	Elgin Wayne Wyatt; 5,107; 17.39%	Harry Zamonsky; 1,474; 5.02%			Gerry Ritz
Blackstrap	J. Wayne Zimmer; 8,206; 22.65%	Lynne Yelich; 16,028; 44.24%	Noreen Johns; 9,551; 26.36%	Tim Stephenson; 1,926; 5.32%	Neil Sinclair; 519; 1.43%		Allan Kerpan†
Churchill River	Rick Laliberte; 9,856; 41.81%	Kerry Peterson; 7,679; 32.57%	Ray Funk; 5,141; 21.81%	David J. Rogers; 755; 3.20%		Brendan Cross; 143; 0.61%	Rick Laliberte
Prince Albert	Tim Longworth; 6,754; 20.77%	Brian Fitzpatrick; 14,825; 45.59%	Dennis J. Nowoselsky; 6,676; 20.53%	David Orchard; 3,943; 12.13%	Benjamin Webster; 317; 0.97%		Derrek Konrad§
Saskatoon—Humboldt	Morris Bodnar; 7,740; 21.72%	Jim Pankiw; 15,780; 44.28%	Armand Roy; 9,420; 26.43%	Lori K. Isinger; 1,963; 5.51%	Jason Hanson; 488; 1.37%	Michelle Luciuk; 245; 0.69%	Jim Pankiw
Saskatoon—Rosetown—Biggar	Alice Farness; 3,023; 11.27%	Carol Skelton; 11,177; 41.66%	Dennis Gruending; 11,109; 41.41%	Dale W. Buxton; 1,518; 5.66%			Dennis Gruending
Saskatoon—Wanuskewin	Bill Patrick; 5,567; 16.82%	Maurice Vellacott; 17,404; 52.57%	Hugh Walker; 8,022; 24.23%	Kirk Eggum; 1,709; 5.16%	David Greenfield; 402; 1.21%		Maurice Vellacott

== Alberta ==
=== Rural Alberta ===
Electoral district	Candidates					Incumbent
Electoral district	Liberal	Canadian Alliance	NDP	PC	Other	Incumbent
Athabasca	Harold Cardinal; 9,793; 28.40%	Dave Chatters; 18,775; 54.46%	Alysia Erickson; 872; 2.53%	Doug Faulkner; 4,224; 12.25%	Reginald Normore (Mar.); 469 1.36%	David Chatters
Athabasca	Harold Cardinal; 9,793; 28.40%	Dave Chatters; 18,775; 54.46%	Alysia Erickson; 872; 2.53%	Doug Faulkner; 4,224; 12.25%	Harvey Alex Scott (Green); 345 1.00%	David Chatters
Crowfoot	Orest Werezak; 2,964; 6.19%	Kevin Sorenson; 33,767; 70.56%	Jay Russell; 1,457; 3.04%	Verlyn Olson; 6,778; 14.16%	Jack Ramsay (NA); 2,668 5.57%	Jack Ramsay
Crowfoot	Orest Werezak; 2,964; 6.19%	Kevin Sorenson; 33,767; 70.56%	Jay Russell; 1,457; 3.04%	Verlyn Olson; 6,778; 14.16%	Valerie Morrow (NA); 223 0.47%	Jack Ramsay
Elk Island	Paul Bokowski; 9,289; 17.69%	Ken Epp; 33,730; 64.23%	Chris Harwood; 3,316; 6.31%	Rod Scarlett; 6,178; 11.76%		Ken Epp
Lakeland	Wayne Kowalski; 9,050; 20.18%	Leon Benoit; 29,348; 65.45%	Raymond Stone; 2,069; 4.61%	Paul Pelletier; 4,373; 9.75%		Leon Benoit
Lethbridge	Vaughan Hartigan; 7,797; 16.94%	Rick Casson; 30,380; 66.02%	Garth Hardy; 2,648; 5.75%	Kimberly Denise Budd; 4,062; 8.83%	Don C. Ferguson (Green); 864 1.88%	Rick Casson
Lethbridge	Vaughan Hartigan; 7,797; 16.94%	Rick Casson; 30,380; 66.02%	Garth Hardy; 2,648; 5.75%	Kimberly Denise Budd; 4,062; 8.83%	Dan Lamden (CAP); 264 0.57%	Rick Casson
Macleod	Marlene LaMontagne; 4,137; 9.41%	Grant Hill; 30,783; 70.05%	Dwayne Good Striker; 2,945; 6.70%	Cyril R. Abbott; 6,079; 13.83%		Grant Hill
Medicine Hat	Trevor Butts; 4,392; 10.48%	Monte Solberg; 31,134; 74.28%	Luke Lacasse; 2,153; 5.14%	Gordon Musgrove; 4,236; 10.11%		Monte Solberg
Peace River	Kim Ksenia Fenton; 6,495; 15.49%	Charlie Penson; 27,508; 65.59%	Patricia Lawrence; 2,914; 6.95%	Milton Hommy; 5,021; 11.97%		Charlie Penson
Red Deer	Walter Kubanek; 6,522; 12.82%	Bob Mills; 36,940; 72.61%	Linda Roth; 2,346; 4.61%	Doug Wagstaff; 5,064; 9.95%		Bob Mills
Wetaskiwin	John Jackie; 8,318; 17.17%	Dale Johnston; 33,675; 69.50%	Cliff Reid; 2,045; 4.22%	Kenneth R. Sockett; 4,413; 9.11%		Dale Johnston
Wild Rose	Bryan E. Mahoney; 6,334; 11.09%	Myron Thompson; 40,193; 70.36%	Anne Wilson; 2,320; 4.06%	Truper McBride; 7,370; 12.90%	Garnet T. Hammer (Ind.); 908; 1.59%	Myron Thompson
Yellowhead	John Higgerty; 6,348; 15.64%	Rob Merrifield; 26,824; 66.08%	J. Noel Lapierre; 1,910; 4.71%	Dale F. Galbraith; 5,141; 12.66%	Jacob Strydhorst (NA); 371; 0.91%	Cliff Breitkreuz†

=== Edmonton and environs ===
Electoral district	Candidates					Incumbent
Electoral district	Liberal	Canadian Alliance	NDP	PC	Other	Incumbent
Edmonton Centre-East	Sue Olsen; 14,323; 34.21%	Peter Goldring; 17,768; 42.44%	Ray Martin; 7,304; 17.44%	Kevin Mahfouz; 2,252; 5.38%	Naomi Rankin (Comm.); 222; 0.53%	Peter Goldring
Edmonton North	Jim Jacuta; 14,786; 34.33%	Deborah Grey; 22,063; 51.22%	Laurie Lang; 3,216; 7.47%	Dean Sanduga; 3,010; 6.99%		Deborah Grey
Edmonton Southeast	David Kilgour; 21,109; 50.87%	Tim Uppal; 16,392; 39.51%	Joginder Kandola; 1,285; 3.10%	Allan Ryan; 2,269; 5.47%	Matthew James (Comm.); 97 0.23%	David Kilgour
Edmonton Southeast	David Kilgour; 21,109; 50.87%	Tim Uppal; 16,392; 39.51%	Joginder Kandola; 1,285; 3.10%	Allan Ryan; 2,269; 5.47%	Michael Sekuloff (CAP); 154 0.37%	David Kilgour
Edmonton Southeast	David Kilgour; 21,109; 50.87%	Tim Uppal; 16,392; 39.51%	Joginder Kandola; 1,285; 3.10%	Allan Ryan; 2,269; 5.47%	Richard Shelford (NLP); 187 0.45%	David Kilgour
Edmonton Southwest	Chiu Lau; 18,223; 33.98%	James Rajotte; 26,197; 48.85%	Bernie Keeler; 2,746; 5.12%	Joseph Fernando; 5,803; 10.82%	Wade McKinley (NLP); 195 0.36%	Ian McClelland†
Edmonton Southwest	Chiu Lau; 18,223; 33.98%	James Rajotte; 26,197; 48.85%	Bernie Keeler; 2,746; 5.12%	Joseph Fernando; 5,803; 10.82%	Jerry Paschen (Green); 462 0.86%	Ian McClelland†
Edmonton—Strathcona	Jonathan Dai; 17,816; 31.89%	Rahim Jaffer; 23,463; 42.00%	Hélène Narayana; 8,256; 14.78%	Gregory Toogood; 5,047; 9.04%	Kevan Hunter (M-L); 164 0.29%	Rahim Jaffer
Edmonton—Strathcona	Jonathan Dai; 17,816; 31.89%	Rahim Jaffer; 23,463; 42.00%	Hélène Narayana; 8,256; 14.78%	Gregory Toogood; 5,047; 9.04%	Ken Kirk (Mar.); 814 1.46%	Rahim Jaffer
Edmonton—Strathcona	Jonathan Dai; 17,816; 31.89%	Rahim Jaffer; 23,463; 42.00%	Hélène Narayana; 8,256; 14.78%	Gregory Toogood; 5,047; 9.04%	Kesa Rose Semenchuk (CAP); 299 0.54%	Rahim Jaffer
Edmonton West	Anne McLellan; 21,978; 44.24%	Betty Unger; 21,245; 42.77%	Richard D. Vanderberg; 2,895; 5.83%	Rory J. Koopmans; 3,009; 6.06%	Peggy Morton (M-L); 194 0.39%	Anne McLellan
Edmonton West	Anne McLellan; 21,978; 44.24%	Betty Unger; 21,245; 42.77%	Richard D. Vanderberg; 2,895; 5.83%	Rory J. Koopmans; 3,009; 6.06%	Dan Parker (CAP); 354 0.71%	Anne McLellan
St. Albert	Bob Russell; 13,637; 24.78%	John Williams; 32,745; 59.50%	John Williams; 2,965; 5.39%	Andy Jones; 5,687; 10.33%		John Williams

=== Calgary ===
Electoral district	Candidates						Incumbent
Electoral district	Liberal	Canadian Alliance	NDP	PC	Green	Other	Incumbent
Calgary Centre	Joanne Levy; 5,630; 9.84%	Eric Lowther; 22,054; 38.53%	Don LePan; 1,604; 2.80%	Joe Clark; 26,358; 46.05%	Michael Alvarez-Toye; 1,170; 2.04%	Margaret Peggy Askin (M-L); 133 0.23%	Eric Lowther
Calgary Centre	Joanne Levy; 5,630; 9.84%	Eric Lowther; 22,054; 38.53%	Don LePan; 1,604; 2.80%	Joe Clark; 26,358; 46.05%	Michael Alvarez-Toye; 1,170; 2.04%	Beverley Smith (Ind.); 293 0.51%	Eric Lowther
Calgary East	Doug Perras; 6,843; 20.47%	Deepak Obhrai; 18,141; 54.26%	Kaie Jones; 1,444; 4.32%	Roger Richard; 5,510; 16.48%		Jason Devine (Comm.); 152 0.45%	Deepak Obhrai
Calgary East	Doug Perras; 6,843; 20.47%	Deepak Obhrai; 18,141; 54.26%	Kaie Jones; 1,444; 4.32%	Roger Richard; 5,510; 16.48%		Grant Adam Krieger (Mar.); 1,222 3.65%	Deepak Obhrai
Calgary East	Doug Perras; 6,843; 20.47%	Deepak Obhrai; 18,141; 54.26%	Kaie Jones; 1,444; 4.32%	Roger Richard; 5,510; 16.48%		Neeraj Varma (NLP); 124 0.37%	Deepak Obhrai
Calgary Northeast	Sam Keshavjee; 9,841; 21.79%	Art Hanger; 28,242; 62.54%	H. Ken Sahil; 1,852; 4.10%	Jerry Vague; 5,222; 11.56%			Art Hanger
Calgary—Nose Hill	Brian Thiessen; 11,602; 19.43%	Diane Ablonczy; 35,904; 60.13%	Jon Adams; 2,227; 3.73%	James F. McArdle; 8,696; 14.56%	Andrew Pickles; 1,092; 1.83%	Maureen Ann Roberts (CAP); 194; 0.32%	Diane Ablonczy
Calgary Southeast	Dana Peace; 6,646; 12.19%	Jason Kenney; 34,492; 63.25%	Giorgio Cattabeni; 1,111; 2.04%	Ray Clark; 11,353; 20.82%	James Stephen Kohut; 931; 1.71%		Jason Kenney
Calgary Southwest	Barry J. Rust; 7,954; 14.93%	Preston Manning; 34,529; 64.81%	Jennifer Stewart; 2,113; 3.97%	Paul Monaghan; 8,679; 16.29%			Preston Manning
Calgary West	Frank Bruseker; 11,181; 18.19%	Rob Anders; 33,222; 54.05%	Greg Klassen; 2,350; 3.82%	Jim Silye; 13,259; 21.57%	Evan Osenton; 1,456; 2.37%		Rob Anders

== British Columbia ==
=== BC Interior ===
Electoral district	Candidates						Incumbent
Electoral district	Liberal	Canadian Alliance	NDP	PC	Green	Other	Incumbent
Cariboo—Chilcotin	John McCarvill; 6,555; 20.34%	Philip Mayfield; 19,213; 59.63%	Raymond John Skelly; 2,915; 9.05%	Pamela J. Culbert; 2,822; 8.76%		Al Charlebois (M-L); 124 0.38%	Philip Mayfield
Cariboo—Chilcotin	John McCarvill; 6,555; 20.34%	Philip Mayfield; 19,213; 59.63%	Raymond John Skelly; 2,915; 9.05%	Pamela J. Culbert; 2,822; 8.76%		William Turkel (Ind.); 591 1.83%	Philip Mayfield
Kamloops, Thompson and Highland Valleys	Jon Moser; 7,582; 15.63%	Betty Hinton; 23,577; 48.59%	Nelson Riis; 13,600; 28.03%	Randy Patch; 3,217; 6.63%		Ernie Schmidt (CAP); 544; 1.12%	Nelson Riis
Kelowna	Joe Leask; 13,564; 23.86%	Werner Schmidt; 33,810; 59.47%	John O. Powell; 3,572; 6.28%	Doug Mallo; 4,708; 8.28%		Jack W. Peach (CAP); 1,199; 2.11%	Werner Schmidt
Kootenay—Boundary—Okanagan	Bill Barlee; 11,357; 27.36%	Jim Gouk; 19,386; 46.70%	Don Scarlett; 4,091; 9.85%	Michele Elise Duncan; 2,147; 5.17%	Andrew Shadrack; 2,689; 6.48%	Bev Collins (CAP); 762 1.84%	Jim Gouk
Kootenay—Boundary—Okanagan	Bill Barlee; 11,357; 27.36%	Jim Gouk; 19,386; 46.70%	Don Scarlett; 4,091; 9.85%	Michele Elise Duncan; 2,147; 5.17%	Andrew Shadrack; 2,689; 6.48%	Annie Holtby (NLP); 191 0.46%	Jim Gouk
Kootenay—Boundary—Okanagan	Bill Barlee; 11,357; 27.36%	Jim Gouk; 19,386; 46.70%	Don Scarlett; 4,091; 9.85%	Michele Elise Duncan; 2,147; 5.17%	Andrew Shadrack; 2,689; 6.48%	Dan Loehndorf (Mar.); 889 2.14%	Jim Gouk
Kootenay—Columbia	Delvin R. Chatterson; 5,581; 14.74%	Jim Abbott; 25,663; 67.78%	Andrea Dunlop; 3,297; 8.71%	Jerry Pirie; 2,165; 5.72%	Jubilee Rose Cacaci; 1,158; 3.06%		Jim Abbott
Okanagan—Coquihalla	Tom Chapman; 9,923; 20.46%	Stockwell Day; 28,794; 59.37%	Ken Ellis; 4,096; 8.45%	Gordon John Seiter; 2,939; 6.06%	Harry Naegel; 1,110; 2.29%	Clay Harmon (NA); 95 0.20%	Stockwell Day
Okanagan—Coquihalla	Tom Chapman; 9,923; 20.46%	Stockwell Day; 28,794; 59.37%	Ken Ellis; 4,096; 8.45%	Gordon John Seiter; 2,939; 6.06%	Harry Naegel; 1,110; 2.29%	Elizabeth Innes (NLP); 167 0.34%	Stockwell Day
Okanagan—Coquihalla	Tom Chapman; 9,923; 20.46%	Stockwell Day; 28,794; 59.37%	Ken Ellis; 4,096; 8.45%	Gordon John Seiter; 2,939; 6.06%	Harry Naegel; 1,110; 2.29%	Dorothy-Jean O'Donnell (M-L); 99 0.20%	Stockwell Day
Okanagan—Coquihalla	Tom Chapman; 9,923; 20.46%	Stockwell Day; 28,794; 59.37%	Ken Ellis; 4,096; 8.45%	Gordon John Seiter; 2,939; 6.06%	Harry Naegel; 1,110; 2.29%	Larry Taylor (CAP); 461 0.95%	Stockwell Day
Okanagan—Coquihalla	Tom Chapman; 9,923; 20.46%	Stockwell Day; 28,794; 59.37%	Ken Ellis; 4,096; 8.45%	Gordon John Seiter; 2,939; 6.06%	Harry Naegel; 1,110; 2.29%	Teresa Taylor (Mar.); 818 1.69%	Stockwell Day
Okanagan—Shuswap	Marvin Friesen; 9,855; 20.59%	Darrel Stinson; 29,345; 61.30%	Wayne Alexander Fowler; 4,060; 8.48%	Sheila Marguerite Wardman; 3,096; 6.47%		K. No Daniels (NA); 447 0.93%	Darrel Stinson
Okanagan—Shuswap	Marvin Friesen; 9,855; 20.59%	Darrel Stinson; 29,345; 61.30%	Wayne Alexander Fowler; 4,060; 8.48%	Sheila Marguerite Wardman; 3,096; 6.47%		Vera Gottlieb (CAP); 724 1.51%	Darrel Stinson
Okanagan—Shuswap	Marvin Friesen; 9,855; 20.59%	Darrel Stinson; 29,345; 61.30%	Wayne Alexander Fowler; 4,060; 8.48%	Sheila Marguerite Wardman; 3,096; 6.47%		David Lethbridge (Comm.); 347 0.72%	Darrel Stinson
Prince George—Bulkley Valley	Jeannette Townsend; 8,202; 23.43%	Dick Harris; 20,596; 58.84%	Mark Walsh; 2,029; 5.80%	Oliver William Ray; 2,448; 6.99%	John Grogan; 793; 2.27%	David MacKay (M-L); 84 0.24%	Dick Harris
Prince George—Bulkley Valley	Jeannette Townsend; 8,202; 23.43%	Dick Harris; 20,596; 58.84%	Mark Walsh; 2,029; 5.80%	Oliver William Ray; 2,448; 6.99%	John Grogan; 793; 2.27%	John Van der Woude (NA); 152 0.43%	Dick Harris
Prince George—Bulkley Valley	Jeannette Townsend; 8,202; 23.43%	Dick Harris; 20,596; 58.84%	Mark Walsh; 2,029; 5.80%	Oliver William Ray; 2,448; 6.99%	John Grogan; 793; 2.27%	Suzanne Woodrow (CAP); 701 2.00%	Dick Harris
Prince George—Peace River	Arleene Thorpe; 5,319; 15.53%	Jay Hill; 23,840; 69.62%	Lenart Nelson; 1,597; 4.66%	Jan Christiansen; 2,103; 6.14%	Hilary Crowley; 744; 2.17%	Henry A. Dunbar (CAP); 562 1.64%	Jay Hill
Prince George—Peace River	Arleene Thorpe; 5,319; 15.53%	Jay Hill; 23,840; 69.62%	Lenart Nelson; 1,597; 4.66%	Jan Christiansen; 2,103; 6.14%	Hilary Crowley; 744; 2.17%	Colby Nicholson (M-L); 80 0.23%	Jay Hill
Skeena	Rhoda Witherly; 8,714; 29.12%	Andy Burton; 12,787; 42.73%	Larry Guno; 6,273; 20.96%	Devin Lee Glowinski; 965; 3.22%	Roger Colin Benham; 688; 2.30%	Cliff Brown (NLP); 140 0.47%	Mike Scott†
Skeena	Rhoda Witherly; 8,714; 29.12%	Andy Burton; 12,787; 42.73%	Larry Guno; 6,273; 20.96%	Devin Lee Glowinski; 965; 3.22%	Roger Colin Benham; 688; 2.30%	George Joseph (NA); 361 1.21%	Mike Scott†

=== Fraser Valley and Southern Lower Mainland ===
Electoral district	Candidates						Incumbent
Electoral district	Liberal	Canadian Alliance	NDP	PC	Green	Other	Incumbent
Delta—South Richmond	Jim Doswell; 15,858; 29.16%	John M. Cummins; 30,882; 56.79%	Ernie Fulton; 3,060; 5.63%	Curtis MacDonald; 3,838; 7.06%		Frank Wagner (NA); 225 0.41%	John Cummins
Delta—South Richmond	Jim Doswell; 15,858; 29.16%	John M. Cummins; 30,882; 56.79%	Ernie Fulton; 3,060; 5.63%	Curtis MacDonald; 3,838; 7.06%		Allan Warnke (CAP); 517 0.95%	John Cummins
Dewdney—Alouette	Jatinder Sidhu; 8,717; 18.07%	Grant McNally; 28,181; 58.42%	Malcolm James Crockett; 5,535; 11.47%	Gord Kehler; 5,804; 12.03%			Grant McNally
Fraser Valley	Hal H. Singleton; 8,965; 16.29%	Chuck Strahl; 38,509; 69.97%	Rob Lees; 3,185; 5.79%	Rocky Nenka; 2,330; 4.23%	Carol Battaglio; 528; 0.96%	Debbie Anderson (CAP); 425 0.77%	Chuck Strahl
Fraser Valley	Hal H. Singleton; 8,965; 16.29%	Chuck Strahl; 38,509; 69.97%	Rob Lees; 3,185; 5.79%	Rocky Nenka; 2,330; 4.23%	Carol Battaglio; 528; 0.96%	Chris Bolster (Comm.); 69 0.13%	Chuck Strahl
Fraser Valley	Hal H. Singleton; 8,965; 16.29%	Chuck Strahl; 38,509; 69.97%	Rob Lees; 3,185; 5.79%	Rocky Nenka; 2,330; 4.23%	Carol Battaglio; 528; 0.96%	Norm Siefken (Mar.); 811 1.47%	Chuck Strahl
Fraser Valley	Hal H. Singleton; 8,965; 16.29%	Chuck Strahl; 38,509; 69.97%	Rob Lees; 3,185; 5.79%	Rocky Nenka; 2,330; 4.23%	Carol Battaglio; 528; 0.96%	Ed Van Woudenberg (NA); 212 0.39%	Chuck Strahl
Langley—Abbotsford	Steve Ferguson; 9,554; 17.26%	Randy White; 38,810; 70.11%	Paul Latham; 2,353; 4.25%	Bev Braaten; 4,218; 7.62%		Harold John Ludwig (NA); 420; 0.76%	Randy White
Richmond	Raymond Chan; 19,940; 42.04%	Joe Peschisolido; 21,064; 44.41%	Gail Paquette; 2,695; 5.68%	Frank Peter Tofin; 2,578; 5.44%	Kevan Hudson; 897; 1.89%	Kathy McClement (NLP); 164 0.35%	Raymond Chan
Richmond	Raymond Chan; 19,940; 42.04%	Joe Peschisolido; 21,064; 44.41%	Gail Paquette; 2,695; 5.68%	Frank Peter Tofin; 2,578; 5.44%	Kevan Hudson; 897; 1.89%	Edith Petersen (M-L); 93 0.20%	Raymond Chan
South Surrey—White Rock—Langley	Bill Brooks; 10,200; 21.26%	Val Meredith; 28,762; 59.95%	Matt Todd; 2,718; 5.66%	Alistair Johnston; 4,796; 10.00%	Steve Chitty; 844; 1.76%	Mavis Louise Becker (Mar.); 559 1.17%	Val Meredith
South Surrey—White Rock—Langley	Bill Brooks; 10,200; 21.26%	Val Meredith; 28,762; 59.95%	Matt Todd; 2,718; 5.66%	Alistair Johnston; 4,796; 10.00%	Steve Chitty; 844; 1.76%	Daphne Quance (NLP); 100 0.21%	Val Meredith
Surrey Central	Peter Warkentin; 19,513; 33.78%	Gurmant Grewal; 29,812; 51.61%	Dan Goy; 3,211; 5.56%	Dan Baxter; 3,940; 6.82%	David Walters; 1,175; 2.03%	Harjit Daudharia (Comm.); 114; 0.20%	Gurmant Grewal
Surrey North	Shinder Purewal; 10,279; 28.87%	Chuck Cadman; 19,973; 56.10%	Art Hildebrant; 2,619; 7.36%	Dareck Faichuk; 1,714; 4.81%	Brian Lutes; 556; 1.56%	Tyler Campbell (Comm.); 174 0.49%	Chuck Cadman
Surrey North	Shinder Purewal; 10,279; 28.87%	Chuck Cadman; 19,973; 56.10%	Art Hildebrant; 2,619; 7.36%	Dareck Faichuk; 1,714; 4.81%	Brian Lutes; 556; 1.56%	Gerhard Herwig (NA); 285 0.80%	Chuck Cadman

=== Vancouver and Northern Lower Mainland ===
Electoral district	Candidates							Incumbent
Electoral district	Liberal	Canadian Alliance	NDP	PC	Green	Canadian Action	Other	Incumbent
Burnaby—Douglas	Francesca Zumpano; 10,774; 23.67%	Alan McDonnell; 15,057; 33.08%	Svend Robinson; 17,018; 37.39%	Kenneth Edgar King; 2,477; 5.44%			Roger Perkins (Comm.); 189; 0.42%	Svend Robinson
New Westminster—Coquitlam—Burnaby	Lee Rankin; 14,579; 30.97%	Paul Forseth; 20,698; 43.97%	Lorrie Williams; 7,076; 15.03%	Mike Redmond; 3,492; 7.42%	François C. Nantel; 1,028; 2.18%		Hanne Gidora (Comm.); 109 0.23%	Paul Forseth
New Westminster—Coquitlam—Burnaby	Lee Rankin; 14,579; 30.97%	Paul Forseth; 20,698; 43.97%	Lorrie Williams; 7,076; 15.03%	Mike Redmond; 3,492; 7.42%	François C. Nantel; 1,028; 2.18%		Brian Sproule (M-L); 93 0.20%	Paul Forseth
North Vancouver	Bill Bell; 18,343; 32.77%	Ted White; 27,920; 49.88%	Sam Schechter; 2,760; 4.93%	Laurence Putnam; 3,975; 7.10%		Diana Jewell; 877; 1.57%	Tunya Audain (Mar.); 1,008 1.80%	Ted White
North Vancouver	Bill Bell; 18,343; 32.77%	Ted White; 27,920; 49.88%	Sam Schechter; 2,760; 4.93%	Laurence Putnam; 3,975; 7.10%		Diana Jewell; 877; 1.57%	Dallas Collis (Ind.); 760 1.36%	Ted White
North Vancouver	Bill Bell; 18,343; 32.77%	Ted White; 27,920; 49.88%	Sam Schechter; 2,760; 4.93%	Laurence Putnam; 3,975; 7.10%		Diana Jewell; 877; 1.57%	Rusty Corben (Ind.); 253 0.45%	Ted White
North Vancouver	Bill Bell; 18,343; 32.77%	Ted White; 27,920; 49.88%	Sam Schechter; 2,760; 4.93%	Laurence Putnam; 3,975; 7.10%		Diana Jewell; 877; 1.57%	Michael Hill (M-L); 80 0.14%	Ted White
Port Moody—Coquitlam—Port Coquitlam	Lou Sekora; 16,937; 29.39%	James Moore; 28,631; 49.69%	Jamie Arden; 5,340; 9.27%	Joe Gluska; 4,506; 7.82%	Dave King; 839; 1.46%	Will Arlow; 452; 0.78%	Paul Geddes (Mar.); 818 1.42%	Sharon Hayes†
Port Moody—Coquitlam—Port Coquitlam	Lou Sekora; 16,937; 29.39%	James Moore; 28,631; 49.69%	Jamie Arden; 5,340; 9.27%	Joe Gluska; 4,506; 7.82%	Dave King; 839; 1.46%	Will Arlow; 452; 0.78%	George Gidora (Comm.); 98 0.17%	Sharon Hayes†
Vancouver Centre	Hedy Fry; 24,553; 42.30%	John Mortimer; 15,176; 26.15%	Scott Robertson; 6,993; 12.05%	Lee Johnson; 6,828; 11.76%	Jamie-Lee Hamilton; 2,285; 3.94%	Jeff Jewell; 742; 1.28%	Kimball Cariou (Comm.); 99 0.17%	Hedy Madeleine Fry
Vancouver Centre	Hedy Fry; 24,553; 42.30%	John Mortimer; 15,176; 26.15%	Scott Robertson; 6,993; 12.05%	Lee Johnson; 6,828; 11.76%	Jamie-Lee Hamilton; 2,285; 3.94%	Jeff Jewell; 742; 1.28%	Marc Emery (Mar.); 1,116 1.92%	Hedy Madeleine Fry
Vancouver Centre	Hedy Fry; 24,553; 42.30%	John Mortimer; 15,176; 26.15%	Scott Robertson; 6,993; 12.05%	Lee Johnson; 6,828; 11.76%	Jamie-Lee Hamilton; 2,285; 3.94%	Jeff Jewell; 742; 1.28%	Valerie Laporte (NLP); 177 0.30%	Hedy Madeleine Fry
Vancouver Centre	Hedy Fry; 24,553; 42.30%	John Mortimer; 15,176; 26.15%	Scott Robertson; 6,993; 12.05%	Lee Johnson; 6,828; 11.76%	Jamie-Lee Hamilton; 2,285; 3.94%	Jeff Jewell; 742; 1.28%	Joseph Theriault (M-L); 75 0.13%	Hedy Madeleine Fry
Vancouver East	Mason Loh; 13,421; 33.74%	Sal Vetro; 5,536; 13.92%	Libby Davies; 16,818; 42.28%	Michael Walsh; 1,439; 3.62%	Kelly Elizabeth White; 975; 2.45%	Brian Bacon; 432; 1.09%	Edna Mathilda Brass (NA); 196 0.49%	Libby Davies
Vancouver East	Mason Loh; 13,421; 33.74%	Sal Vetro; 5,536; 13.92%	Libby Davies; 16,818; 42.28%	Michael Walsh; 1,439; 3.62%	Kelly Elizabeth White; 975; 2.45%	Brian Bacon; 432; 1.09%	Rosemary Galte (NLP); 97 0.24%	Libby Davies
Vancouver East	Mason Loh; 13,421; 33.74%	Sal Vetro; 5,536; 13.92%	Libby Davies; 16,818; 42.28%	Michael Walsh; 1,439; 3.62%	Kelly Elizabeth White; 975; 2.45%	Brian Bacon; 432; 1.09%	Gloria Anne Kieler (NA); 143 0.36%	Libby Davies
Vancouver East	Mason Loh; 13,421; 33.74%	Sal Vetro; 5,536; 13.92%	Libby Davies; 16,818; 42.28%	Michael Walsh; 1,439; 3.62%	Kelly Elizabeth White; 975; 2.45%	Brian Bacon; 432; 1.09%	David Malmo-Levine (Mar.); 724 1.82%	Libby Davies
Vancouver Kingsway	Sophia Leung; 16,118; 43.07%	Alice Wong; 11,076; 29.60%	Victor Wong; 5,921; 15.82%	Kanman Wong; 1,803; 4.82%	Phillip Petrik; 1,009; 2.70%	Connie Fogal; 1,200; 3.21%	Elwyn Patterson (Comm.); 168 0.45%	Sophia Leung
Vancouver Kingsway	Sophia Leung; 16,118; 43.07%	Alice Wong; 11,076; 29.60%	Victor Wong; 5,921; 15.82%	Kanman Wong; 1,803; 4.82%	Phillip Petrik; 1,009; 2.70%	Connie Fogal; 1,200; 3.21%	Donna Petersen (M-L); 126 0.34%	Sophia Leung
Vancouver Quadra	Stephen Owen; 22,253; 44.84%	Kerry-Lynne Findlay; 18,613; 37.50%	Loretta Woodcock; 2,595; 5.23%	Bill Clarke; 4,112; 8.28%	Doug Warkentin; 1,434; 2.89%	Chris Shaw; 390; 0.79%	Steven Beck (NLP); 126 0.25%	Ted McWhinney†
Vancouver Quadra	Stephen Owen; 22,253; 44.84%	Kerry-Lynne Findlay; 18,613; 37.50%	Loretta Woodcock; 2,595; 5.23%	Bill Clarke; 4,112; 8.28%	Doug Warkentin; 1,434; 2.89%	Chris Shaw; 390; 0.79%	Anne Jamieson (M-L); 109 0.22%	Ted McWhinney†
Vancouver South—Burnaby	Herb Dhaliwal; 17,705; 42.69%	Ron Jack; 15,384; 37.09%	Herschel Hardin; 3,848; 9.27%	Dan Tidball; 2,649; 6.38%	Imtiaz Popat; 646; 1.55%	Adam Sealey; 430; 1.03%	Charles Boylan (M-L); 101; 0.24%	Herb Dhaliwal
Vancouver South—Burnaby	Herb Dhaliwal; 17,705; 42.69%	Ron Jack; 15,384; 37.09%	Herschel Hardin; 3,848; 9.27%	Dan Tidball; 2,649; 6.38%	Imtiaz Popat; 646; 1.55%	Adam Sealey; 430; 1.03%	Michelle Jasmine Chang (Ind.); 465; 1.12%	Herb Dhaliwal
Vancouver South—Burnaby	Herb Dhaliwal; 17,705; 42.69%	Ron Jack; 15,384; 37.09%	Herschel Hardin; 3,848; 9.27%	Dan Tidball; 2,649; 6.38%	Imtiaz Popat; 646; 1.55%	Adam Sealey; 430; 1.03%	Derrick O'Keefe (Ind.); 158; 1.03%	Herb Dhaliwal
Vancouver South—Burnaby	Herb Dhaliwal; 17,705; 42.69%	Ron Jack; 15,384; 37.09%	Herschel Hardin; 3,848; 9.27%	Dan Tidball; 2,649; 6.38%	Imtiaz Popat; 646; 1.55%	Adam Sealey; 430; 1.03%	Prince Pabbies (NLP); 81; 0.19%	Herb Dhaliwal
West Vancouver—Sunshine Coast	Ian McKay; 14,169; 26.60%	John Reynolds; 25,546; 47.97%	Telis Savvaidis; 3,351; 6.29%	Kate Manvell; 4,993; 9.38%	Jane Bishop; 2,605; 4.89%	Marc Bombois; 976; 1.83%	Dana Larsen (Mar.); 1,618; 3.04%	John Reynolds

=== Vancouver Island ===
Electoral district	Candidates							Incumbent
Electoral district	Liberal	Canadian Alliance	NDP	PC	Green	Natural Law	Other	Incumbent
Esquimalt—Juan de Fuca	Alan Thompson; 11,536; 23.92%	Keith Martin; 23,982; 49.73%	Carol E. Harris; 6,468; 13.41%	John Vukovic; 3,857; 8.00%	Casey Brennan; 2,056; 4.26%	Paul E. Tessier; 324; 0.67%		Keith Martin
Nanaimo—Alberni	Hira Chopra; 10,877; 20.70%	James D. Lunney; 26,516; 50.45%	Bill Holdom; 7,635; 14.53%	Bill McCullough; 5,340; 10.16%		Marty Howe; 235; 0.45%	Brunie Brunie (Ind.); 830 1.58%	Bill Gilmour†
Nanaimo—Alberni	Hira Chopra; 10,877; 20.70%	James D. Lunney; 26,516; 50.45%	Bill Holdom; 7,635; 14.53%	Bill McCullough; 5,340; 10.16%		Marty Howe; 235; 0.45%	Donald Lavallee (Mar.); 1,125 2.14%	Bill Gilmour†
Nanaimo—Cowichan	Marshall Cooper; 10,857; 21.42%	Reed Elley; 23,641; 46.63%	Garth Mirau; 8,599; 16.96%	Cynthia-Mary Hemsworth; 3,640; 7.18%	Norm Abbey; 1,196; 2.36%		Doug Catley (CAP); 1,500 2.96%	Reed Elley
Nanaimo—Cowichan	Marshall Cooper; 10,857; 21.42%	Reed Elley; 23,641; 46.63%	Garth Mirau; 8,599; 16.96%	Cynthia-Mary Hemsworth; 3,640; 7.18%	Norm Abbey; 1,196; 2.36%		Meaghan Walker-Williams (Mar.); 1,262 2.49%	Reed Elley
Saanich—Gulf Islands	Karen Knott; 19,002; 32.30%	Gary Lunn; 25,392; 43.16%	Pat O'Neill; 4,721; 8.02%	Don Page; 6,049; 10.28%	Wally Du Temple; 3,243; 5.51%	Kathleen Lapeyrouse; 217; 0.37%	Dan Moreau (NA); 123 0.21%	Gary Lunn
Saanich—Gulf Islands	Karen Knott; 19,002; 32.30%	Gary Lunn; 25,392; 43.16%	Pat O'Neill; 4,721; 8.02%	Don Page; 6,049; 10.28%	Wally Du Temple; 3,243; 5.51%	Kathleen Lapeyrouse; 217; 0.37%	Charley Stimac (Comm.); 88 0.15%	Gary Lunn
Vancouver Island North	Daniel P. Smith; 12,092; 24.84%	John Duncan; 24,844; 51.04%	Alex Turner; 5,701; 11.71%	David R. Tingley; 2,997; 6.16%	Pam Munroe; 2,532; 5.20%	Nancy More; 205; 0.42%	Jack East (M-L); 92 0.19%	John Duncan
Vancouver Island North	Daniel P. Smith; 12,092; 24.84%	John Duncan; 24,844; 51.04%	Alex Turner; 5,701; 11.71%	David R. Tingley; 2,997; 6.16%	Pam Munroe; 2,532; 5.20%	Nancy More; 205; 0.42%	John Krell (NA); 216 0.44%	John Duncan
Victoria	David Anderson; 23,730; 42.65%	Bruce Hallsor; 16,502; 29.66%	David Turner; 7,243; 13.02%	Brian Burchill; 3,629; 6.52%	Joan Elizabeth Russow; 3,264; 5.87%	Cal Danyluk; 138; 0.25%	Chuck Beyer (Mar.); 863 1.55%	David Anderson
Victoria	David Anderson; 23,730; 42.65%	Bruce Hallsor; 16,502; 29.66%	David Turner; 7,243; 13.02%	Brian Burchill; 3,629; 6.52%	Joan Elizabeth Russow; 3,264; 5.87%	Cal Danyluk; 138; 0.25%	Lorenzo A. Bouchard (Ind.); 101 0.18%	David Anderson
Victoria	David Anderson; 23,730; 42.65%	Bruce Hallsor; 16,502; 29.66%	David Turner; 7,243; 13.02%	Brian Burchill; 3,629; 6.52%	Joan Elizabeth Russow; 3,264; 5.87%	Cal Danyluk; 138; 0.25%	Mary Moreau (NA); 75 0.13%	David Anderson
Victoria	David Anderson; 23,730; 42.65%	Bruce Hallsor; 16,502; 29.66%	David Turner; 7,243; 13.02%	Brian Burchill; 3,629; 6.52%	Joan Elizabeth Russow; 3,264; 5.87%	Cal Danyluk; 138; 0.25%	Scott Rushton (Comm.); 92 0.17%	David Anderson

== Nunavut ==
Electoral district	Candidates				Incumbent
Electoral district	Liberal	NDP	PC	Green	Incumbent
Nunavut	Nancy Karetak-Lindell; 5,327; 69.01%	Palluq Susan Enuaraq; 1,410; 18.27%	Mike Sherman; 633; 8.20%	Brian Robert Jones; 349; 4.52%	Nancy Karetak-Lindell

== Northwest Territories ==
Electoral district	Candidates				Incumbent
Electoral district	Liberal	Canadian Alliance	NDP	PC	Incumbent
Western Arctic	**Ethel Blondin-Andrew**; 5,855; 45.60%	Fred Turner; 2,273; 17.70%	Dennis Bevington; 3,430; 26.71%	Bruce McLaughlin; 1,282; 9.98%	**Ethel Blondin-Andrew**

== Yukon ==
Electoral district	Candidates					Incumbent
Electoral district	Liberal	Canadian Alliance	NDP	PC	Nil	Incumbent
Yukon	Larry Bagnell; 4,293; 32.48%	Jim Kenyon; 3,659; 27.68%	Louise Hardy; 4,223; 31.95%	Don Cox; 991; 7.50%	Geoffrey Capp; 53; 0.40%	Larry Bagnell
