= Pinsonneault =

Pinsonneault is a surname found in Canada. Notable people with the surname include:

- Alfred Pinsonneault (c. 1830–1897), Canadian politician
- Chase Pinsonneault (2006), Canadian professional stock car racing driver
- Jean-Paul Pinsonneault (1923–1978), Canadian writer
- Steve Pinsonneault (?), Canadian politician
