= Louis Conrad =

Louis Conrad may refer to:

- Louis Conrad Pelletier (1852–1929), Quebec lawyer and political figure
- Louis Conrad Rosenberg (1890–1983), American artist, architect, author, and educator

== See also ==
- Louis William Conradt Jr. (1950–2006), American district attorney who shot himself on TV
