= Richard Bélisle =

Canadian politician (born 1946)

Member of Parliament for La Prairie
- In office 1993–1997
- Preceded by: Fernand Jourdenais
- Succeeded by: riding dissolved

Personal details
- Born: 20 July 1946 (age 80) Montreal, Quebec
- Party: Conservative (2004-); Quebec Liberal Party (2008-)
- Other political affiliations: Bloc Québécois (1993-2000); Canadian Alliance (2000-2004)
- Profession: health, safety

Richard Bélisle (born 20 July 1946 in Montreal, Quebec) is a Canadian politician who was a member of the House of Commons of Canada from 1993 to 1997. His career has been in health and safety fields.

He was elected in the La Prairie electoral district under the Bloc Québécois party in the 1993 federal election, thus he served in the 35th Canadian Parliament. Due to riding restructuring, he sought re-election in the Saint-Lambert electoral district in the 1997 federal election, but lost to Liberal Party of Canada candidate Yolande Thibeault.

Bélisle switched to the Canadian Alliance party and campaigned in the 2000 federal election at the Brossard—La Prairie electoral district. He lost to Liberal Jacques Saada.

In the 2004 federal election he unsuccessfully ran as the Conservative Party of Canada candidate in the riding of Longueuil—Pierre-Boucher.

In the 2008 Quebec general election, Richard Bélisle ran for the Quebec Liberal Party in the Longueuil provincial electoral district of Taillon, losing to the Parti Québécois incumbent Marie Malavoy.

He was defeated as the Conservative Party candidate in the riding of Longueuil—Pierre-Boucher in the 2011 federal election.
