= Côme-Séraphin Cherrier =

Côme-Séraphin Cherrier may refer to:

- Côme-Séraphin Cherrier (Lower Canada politician) (1798–1885), a member of the Legislative Assembly of Lower Canada
- Côme-Séraphin Cherrier (Quebec politician) (1848–1912), a member of the Legislative Assembly of Quebec
