= 2025 Ride the 'Dente 200 =

1st race of the 2025 ARCA Menards Series

Race details
- Race 1 of 20 of the 2025 ARCA Menards Series
- Date: February 15, 2025
- Official name: 62nd Annual Ride the 'Dente 200
- Location: Daytona International Speedway, Daytona Beach, Florida
- Course: Permanent racing facility
- Course length: 2.5 miles (4 km)
- Distance: 80 laps, 200 mi (321 km)
- Scheduled distance: 80 laps, 200 mi (321 km)
- Average speed: 96.450 mph (155.221 km/h)

Pole position
Driver	William Sawalich	Joe Gibbs Racing
- Grid positions set by competition-based formula

Most laps led
Driver	William Sawalich	Joe Gibbs Racing
- Laps: 29

Winner
No. 28	Brenden Queen	Pinnacle Racing Group

Television in the United States
- Network: FOX
- Announcers: Jamie Little, Phil Parsons and Trevor Bayne

Radio in the United States
- Radio: MRN

The 2025 Ride the 'Dente 200 (alternatively known as the 2025 Chili's 200 for drivers under 21) was the first stock car race of the 2025 ARCA Menards Series season, and the 62nd running of the event. The race was held on Saturday, February 15, 2025, at Daytona International Speedway in Daytona Beach, Florida, a 2.5 mile (4 km) permanent tri-oval shaped asphalt superspeedway. The race took the scheduled 80 laps to complete. In a wild race that included numerous wrecks, Brenden Queen, driving for Pinnacle Racing Group, would survive the chaos that took place, and scored his first career ARCA Menards Series win. William Sawalich was awarded the pole and led a race-high 29 laps, finishing in 2nd. To fill out the podium, Jason Kitzmiller, driving for CR7 Motorsports, would finish in 3rd, respectively.

== Report ==
=== Background ===
Daytona International Speedway, the circuit where the race was held.

Daytona International Speedway is one of three superspeedways to hold NASCAR races, the other two being Atlanta Motor Speedway and Talladega Superspeedway. The standard track at Daytona International Speedway is a four-turn superspeedway that is 2.5 miles (4.0 km) long. The track's turns are banked at 31 degrees, while the front stretch, the location of the finish line, is banked at 18 degrees.

==== Entry list ====
- (R) denotes rookie driver.

#	Driver	Team	Make	Sponsor
0	Brayton Laster (R)	Wayne Peterson Racing	Chevrolet	Clear Tech Pools
02	Craig Bracken	Young's Motorsports	Chevrolet	Technique High / Speed Prototypes
03	Alex Clubb	Clubb Racing Inc.	Ford	Race Parts Liquidators / A. Clubb Lawn Care
3	Willie Mullins	Mullins Racing	Ford	CorvetteParts.net / Crow Wing Recycling
4	Dale Quarterley	1/4 Ley Racing	Chevrolet	Van Dyk Recycling Solutions / ACI
06	Bryce Haugeberg	Fast Track Racing	Toyota	North Dakota State University / Brenco
6	Lavar Scott	Rev Racing	Chevrolet	Max Siegel Inc.
7	Eric Caudell	CCM Racing	Toyota	Coble Enterprises / Red Tide Canopies
8	Sean Corr	Empire Racing	Chevrolet	NESCO Bus Sales
9	Jason White	Fast Track Racing	Ford	More Core / Powder Ventures
10	Ed Pompa	Fast Track Racing	Ford	Double "H" Ranch
11	Cody Dennison	Fast Track Racing	Chevrolet	Timcast
12	Takuma Koga	Fast Track Racing	Toyota	Macnica Yit Ikedo / CKB
15	Chase Pinsonneault	Venturini Motorsports	Toyota	131 MotorSports Park
18	William Sawalich	Joe Gibbs Racing	Toyota	Starkey
20	Lawless Alan	Venturini Motorsports	Toyota	AutoParkIt.com
23	Katherine Legge	Sigma Performance Services	Chevrolet	Sirp.ai / El Bandido Yankee Tequila
25	Jake Finch	Venturini Motorsports	Toyota	Phoenix Construction
27	Tim Richmond	Richmond Motorsports	Toyota	Immigration Law Center
28	Brenden Queen (R)	Pinnacle Racing Group	Chevrolet	BestRepair.net
29	Kyle Steckly	Rette Jones Racing	Ford	APC Auto Parts Centres
30	Garrett Mitchell	Rette Jones Racing	Ford	Kenetix
31	Tim Viens	Rise Motorsports	Toyota	HitchGO / Opella
36	Ryan Huff	Ryan Huff Motorsports	Ford	Commonwealth Equipment
46	Thad Moffitt	Nitro Motorsports	Toyota	Safety-Kleen
48	Jeff Scofield	Scofield Motorsports	Chevrolet	JXT Transportation
52	Robert Martin	Martin Racing	Toyota	Martin Racing
55	Isabella Robusto (R)	Venturini Motorsports	Toyota	Mobil 1
57	Hunter Deshautelle	Brother-In-Law Racing	Chevrolet	O. B. Builders
62	Steve Lewis Jr.	Steve Lewis Racing	Chevrolet	Patriot Roof Group / Splatzz.com
67	Ryan Roulette	Maples Motorsports	Ford	VFW / Maples Motorsports
68	Scott Melton	Kimmel Racing	Ford	Melton-McFadden Insurance Agency
69	Nolan Wilson	Kimmel Racing	Ford	Stowell Co-Decisely Ins
70	Amber Balcaen	Nitro Motorsports	Toyota	Gambit Technologies / ICON Direct
73	Andy Jankowiak	KLAS Motorsports	Ford	KLAS Motorsports
75	Bryan Dauzat	Brother-In-Law Racing	Chevrolet	O. B. Builders
76	Kole Raz	AM Racing	Ford	Cyclum Renewable Truck Stops
77	Corey Day	Spire Motorsports	Chevrolet	HendrickCars.com
82	Hélio Castroneves	Pinnacle Racing Group	Chevrolet	Wendy's
86	Becca Monopoli	City Garage Motorsports	Toyota	Orlando Health
87	Chuck Buchanan Jr.	Charles Buchanan Racing	Chevrolet	Spring Drug
88	A. J. Moyer	Moyer-Petroniro Racing	Chevrolet	River's Edge Cottages & RV Park
93	Caleb Costner	CW Motorsports	Chevrolet	Piedmont Outfitters
97	Jason Kitzmiller	CR7 Motorsports	Chevrolet	A.L.L. Construction
99	Michael Maples	Maples Motorsports	Chevrolet	Don Ray Petroleum / Maples Motorsports
Official entry list

== Practice ==
The first and only practice session was originally scheduled to be held on Thursday, February 13, at 4:05 PM EST, but was postponed due to inclement weather. Practice was rescheduled for Friday, February 14, at 1:30 PM EST, the original qualifying time slot, and would last for 45 minutes. Thad Moffitt, driving for Nitro Motorsports, would set the fastest time in the session, with a lap of 49.772, and a speed of 180.825 mph (291.010 km/h).

Pos.	#	Driver	Team	Make	Time	Speed
1	46	Thad Moffitt	Nitro Motorsports	Toyota	49.772	180.825
2	55	Isabella Robusto (R)	Venturini Motorsports	Toyota	49.804	180.708
3	20	Lawless Alan	Venturini Motorsports	Toyota	49.805	180.705
Official practice results

== Starting lineup ==
Qualifying was originally scheduled to be held on Friday, February 14, at 1:30 PM EST. The qualifying procedure used is a multi-car, multi-lap group-based system. Drivers will be split into different groups of seven to eight drivers. Each group will have four minutes to set a lap time, and the driver who sets the overall fastest lap between the groups will win the pole. The fastest 34 drivers will lock in, with the final 6 spots being reserved for provisional starters.

Qualifying was cancelled due to inclement weather from the previous day, with the starting lineup based on the 2024 ARCA Menards Series owner point standings. As a result, William Sawalich, driving for Joe Gibbs Racing, would start on the pole.

Chase Pinsonneault, Ryan Huff, Robert Martin, Steve Lewis Jr., and Chuck Buchanan Jr. would fail to qualify.

=== Starting lineup ===
Pos.	#	Driver	Team	Make
1	18	William Sawalich	Joe Gibbs Racing	Toyota
2	20	Lawless Alan	Venturini Motorsports	Toyota
3	6	Lavar Scott	Rev Racing	Chevrolet
4	55	Isabella Robusto (R)	Venturini Motorsports	Toyota
5	28	Brenden Queen (R)	Pinnacle Racing Group	Chevrolet
6	25	Jake Finch	Venturini Motorsports	Toyota
7	46	Thad Moffitt	Nitro Motorsports	Toyota
8	76	Kole Raz	AM Racing	Ford
9	23	Katherine Legge	Sigma Performance Services	Chevrolet
10	11	Cody Dennison	Fast Track Racing	Chevrolet
11	9	Jason White	Fast Track Racing	Ford
12	12	Takuma Koga	Fast Track Racing	Toyota
13	10	Ed Pompa	Fast Track Racing	Ford
14	03	Alex Clubb	Clubb Racing Inc.	Ford
15	06	Bryce Haugeberg	Fast Track Racing	Toyota
16	31	Tim Viens	Rise Motorsports	Toyota
17	99	Michael Maples	Maples Motorsports	Chevrolet
18	48	Jeff Scofield	Scofield Motorsports	Chevrolet
19	82	Hélio Castroneves	Pinnacle Racing Group	Chevrolet
20	73	Andy Jankowiak	KLAS Motorsports	Ford
21	77	Corey Day	Spire Motorsports	Chevrolet
22	3	Willie Mullins	Mullins Racing	Ford
23	93	Caleb Costner	CW Motorsports	Chevrolet
24	97	Jason Kitzmiller	CR7 Motorsports	Chevrolet
25	86	Becca Monopoli	City Garage Motorsports	Toyota
26	27	Tim Richmond	Richmond Motorsports	Toyota
27	30	Garrett Mitchell	Rette Jones Racing	Ford
28	69	Nolan Wilson	Kimmel Racing	Ford
29	67	Ryan Roulette	Maples Motorsports	Ford
30	70	Amber Balcaen	Nitro Motorsports	Toyota
31	29	Kyle Steckly	Rette Jones Racing	Ford
32	02	Craig Bracken	Young's Motorsports	Chevrolet
33	8	Sean Corr	Empire Racing	Chevrolet
34	4	Dale Quarterley	1/4 Ley Racing	Chevrolet
35	0	Brayton Laster (R)	Wayne Peterson Racing	Chevrolet
36	68	Scott Melton	Kimmel Racing	Ford
37	7	Eric Caudell	CCM Racing	Toyota
38	88	A. J. Moyer	Moyer-Petroniro Racing	Chevrolet
39	57	Hunter Deshautelle	Brother-In-Law Racing	Chevrolet
40	75	Bryan Dauzat	Brother-In-Law Racing	Chevrolet
Failed to qualify
41	15	Chase Pinsonneault	Venturini Motorsports	Toyota
42	36	Ryan Huff	Ryan Huff Motorsports	Ford
43	52	Robert Martin	Martin Racing	Toyota
44	62	Steve Lewis Jr.	Steve Lewis Racing	Chevrolet
45	87	Chuck Buchanan Jr.	Charles Buchanan Racing	Chevrolet
Official starting lineup

== Race results ==
Fin	St	#	Driver	Team	Make	Laps	Led	Status	Pts
1	5	28	Brenden Queen (R)	Pinnacle Racing Group	Chevrolet	80	10	Running	47
2	1	18	William Sawalich	Joe Gibbs Racing	Toyota	80	29	Running	44
3	24	97	Jason Kitzmiller	CR7 Motorsports	Chevrolet	80	0	Running	41
4	3	6	Lavar Scott	Rev Racing	Chevrolet	80	10	Running	41
5	19	82	Hélio Castroneves	Pinnacle Racing Group	Chevrolet	80	0	Running	39
6	8	76	Kole Raz	AM Racing	Ford	80	0	Running	38
7	38	88	A. J. Moyer	Moyer-Petroniro Racing	Chevrolet	80	0	Running	37
8	20	73	Andy Jankowiak	KLAS Motorsports	Ford	80	0	Running	36
9	29	67	Ryan Roulette	Maples Motorsports	Ford	80	0	Running	35
10	15	06	Bryce Haugeberg	Fast Track Racing	Toyota	80	4	Running	35
11	39	57	Hunter Deshautelle	Brother-In-Law Racing	Chevrolet	80	0	Running	33
12	11	9	Jason White	Fast Track Racing	Ford	80	0	Running	32
13	13	10	Ed Pompa	Fast Track Racing	Ford	80	0	Running	31
14	18	48	Jeff Scofield	Scofield Motorsports	Chevrolet	77	0	Running	30
15	6	25	Jake Finch	Venturini Motorsports	Chevrolet	75	0	Running	29
16	14	03	Alex Clubb	Clubb Racing Inc.	Ford	74	0	Running	28
17	26	27	Tim Richmond	Richmond Motorsports	Toyota	64	0	Mechanical	27
18	2	20	Lawless Alan	Venturini Motorsports	Toyota	52	26	Running	27
19	16	31	Tim Viens	Rise Motorsports	Toyota	51	0	Running	25
20	40	75	Bryan Dauzat	Brother-In-Law Racing	Chevrolet	50	0	Mechanical	24
21	4	55	Isabella Robusto (R)	Venturini Motorsports	Toyota	48	0	Mechanical	23
22	21	77	Corey Day	Spire Motorsports	Chevrolet	45	0	Accident	22
23	36	68	Scott Melton	Kimmel Racing	Ford	40	1	Mechanical	22
24	35	0	Brayton Laster (R)	Wayne Peterson Racing	Chevrolet	24	0	Accident	20
25	12	12	Takuma Koga	Fast Track Racing	Ford	18	0	Accident	19
26	25	86	Becca Monopoli	City Garage Motorsports	Toyota	18	0	Accident	18
27	32	02	Craig Bracken	Young's Motorsports	Chevrolet	18	0	Accident	17
28	28	69	Nolan Wilson	Kimmel Racing	Ford	18	0	Mechanical	16
29	30	70	Amber Balcaen	Nitro Motorsports	Toyota	17	0	Accident	15
30	27	30	Garrett Mitchell	Rette Jones Racing	Ford	17	0	Accident	14
31	17	99	Michael Maples	Maples Motorsports	Chevrolet	13	0	Accident	13
32	31	29	Kyle Steckly	Rette Jones Racing	Ford	11	0	Accident	12
33	34	4	Dale Quarterley	1/4 Ley Racing	Chevrolet	6	0	Accident	11
34	10	11	Cody Dennison	Fast Track Racing	Chevrolet	4	0	Accident	10
35	22	3	Willie Mullins	Mullins Racing	Ford	4	0	Accident	9
36	33	8	Sean Corr	Empire Racing	Chevrolet	4	0	Accident	8
37	7	46	Thad Moffitt	Nitro Motorsports	Toyota	3	0	Accident	7
38	23	93	Caleb Costner	CW Motorsports	Chevrolet	3	0	Accident	6
39	9	23	Katherine Legge	Sigma Performance Services	Chevrolet	3	0	Accident	5
40	37	7	Eric Caudell	CCM Racing	Toyota	3	0	Accident	4
Official race results

== Standings after the race ==
Drivers' Championship standings

Pos	Driver	Points
1	Brenden Queen	47
2	William Sawalich	44 (-3)
3	Jason Kitzmiller	41 (–6)
4	Lavar Scott	40 (–7)
5	Hélio Castroneves	39 (–8)
6	Kole Raz	38 (–9)
7	A. J. Moyer	37 (–10)
8	Andy Jankowiak	36 (–11)
9	Ryan Roulette	35 (–12)
10	Bryce Haugeberg	35 (–12)

- Note: Only the first 10 positions are included for the driver standings.

Previous race: 2024 Owens Corning 200	ARCA Menards Series; 2025 season	Next race: 2025 General Tire 150 (Phoenix)
