= Craig Bracken =

Canadian racing driver

- Born: September 15, 1972 (age 54); Windsor, Ontario, Canada

ARCA Menards Series career
- 2 races run over 3 years
- Best finish: 134th (2025)
- First race: 2002 Pork, The Other White Meat 200 (Berlin)
- Last race: 2025 Ride the 'Dente 200 (Daytona)
Wins	Top tens	Poles
0	0	0
- Statistics up to date as of February 15, 2025.

Craig Bracken (born September 15, 1972) is a Canadian professional stock car racing driver who last competed part-time in the ARCA Menards Series, driving the No. 02 Chevrolet for Young's Motorsports.

== Racing career ==
In 2002, Bracken made his debut in the ARCA Re/Max Series at Berlin Raceway, driving the No. 8 Chevrolet for Norm Benning Racing, where he started 32nd and finished 33rd after running only two laps due to rear end issues. He attempted one more race in 2005, driving the No. 09 car at Toledo Speedway, where he failed to qualify.

In 2025, it was revealed that Bracken would participate in the pre-season test for the now ARCA Menards Series at Daytona International Speedway, driving for Fast Track Racing. A month later, it was revealed that Bracken would attempt to qualify for the season opening race at Daytona, this time driving the No. 02 Chevrolet for Young's Motorsports. Bracken was involved in a crash on lap 19 and finished the race in 27th. After being taken to the infield care center after the accident, Bracken was transported to a local hospital for further evaluation.

== Motorsports career results ==
=== ARCA Menards Series ===
(key) (Bold – Pole position awarded by qualifying time. Italics – Pole position earned by points standings or practice time. * – Most laps led. ** – All laps led.)

ARCA Menards Series results
Year	Team	No.	Make	1	2	3	4	5	6	7	8	9	10	11	12	13	14	15	16	17	18	19	20	21	22	23	AMSC	Pts	Ref
2002	Norm Benning Racing	8	Chevy	DAY	ATL	NSH	SLM	KEN	CLT	KAN	POC	MCH	TOL	SBO	KEN	BLN; 33	POC	NSH	ISF	WIN	DSF	CHI	SLM	TAL	CLT		162nd	65	
2005	N/A	09	N/A	DAY	NSH	SLM	KEN	TOL	LAN	MIL	POC	MCH	KAN	KEN	BLN	POC	GTW	LER	NSH	MCH	ISF	TOL; DNQ	DSF	CHI	SLM	TAL	N/A	0	
2025	Young's Motorsports	02	Chevy	DAY; 27	PHO	TAL	KAN	CLT	MCH	BLN	ELK	LRP	DOV	IRP	IOW	GLN	ISF	MAD	DSF	BRI	SLM	KAN	TOL				134th	17	
