= La Prairie—Atateken =

Federal electoral district in Quebec, Canada

Quebec electoral district
- Interactive map of riding boundaries from the 2025 federal election

Federal electoral district
- Legislature: House of Commons
MP
Jacques Ramsay
Liberal
- District created: 2013
- First contested: 2015
- Last contested: 2025
- District webpage: profile, map

Demographics
- Population (2016): 105,496
- Electors (2019): 86,779
- Area (km²): 295
- Pop. density (per km²): 357.6
- Census division: Roussillon
- Census subdivision(s): Saint-Constant, La Prairie, Candiac, Sainte-Catherine, Kahnawake, Delson, Saint-Philippe, Saint-Mathieu

La Prairie—Atateken (formerly La Prairie, French pronunciation: [la pʁɛʁi]) is a federal electoral district in Quebec, Canada, that was represented in the House of Commons of Canada from 1867 to 1896, 1968 to 1997 and again since 2015.

== Demographics ==
According to the 2021 Canadian census, 2023 representation order

Racial groups: 84.2% White, 3.2% Black, 2.9% Chinese, 2.8% Latin American, 2.1% Arab, 1.4% Indigenous
Languages: 80.4% French, 8.4% English, 2.9% Spanish, 1.6% Mandarin, 1.4% Arabic, 1.1% Romanian
Religions: 67.0% Christian (56.3% Catholic, 2.8% Christian Orthodox, 7.9% Other), 3.8% Muslim, 28.0% None
Median income: $48,400 (2020)
Average income: $60,050 (2020)

== History ==
The riding of Laprairie was created by the British North America Act 1867. It consisted of the parishes of Laprairie, Saint-Philippe, Saint Jacques le Mineur, Saint Isidore and Saint Constant, the Indian Lands of Sault Saint Louis, and all islands in the River Saint Lawrence close to the county. It was abolished in 1892 when it was redistributed into the Châteauguay and Laprairie—Napierville electoral districts.

The riding was re-created in 1966 from Beauharnois—Salaberry and Châteauguay—Huntingdon—Laprairie ridings. It consisted of:

- the City of Saint-Lambert;
- the Towns of Brossard, Candiac, Châteauguay, Châteauguay-Centre, Châteauguay Heights, Delson, Greenfield Park, La Prairie, LeMoyne, Léry and Préville; and
- in the County of Laprairie: the parish municipalities of Saint-Constant and Sainte-Catherine-d'Alexandrie-de-Laprairie; and the Indian Reserve of Caughnawaga No. 14.

In 1976, it was redefined to consist of:

- the City of Saint-Lambert;
- the Towns of Brossard, Candiac, Greenfield Park, La Prairie and LeMoyne; and
- in the county of Laprairie: the municipality of Notre-Dame.

In 1980, it was renamed La Prairie. In 1987, it was redefined to consist of the towns of Brossard, Candiac, La Prairie et Saint-Lambert.

The riding was abolished in 1996 when it was abolished into Brossard—La Prairie and Saint-Lambert.

This riding was re-created during the 2012 electoral redistribution from parts of Châteauguay—Saint-Constant and Brossard—La Prairie.

Following the 2022 federal electoral redistribution the riding was renamed La Prairie—Atateken. It gained a small piece of territory north of Autoroute 30 in Saint-Isidore and a small piece of territory near Ch. St-Bernard in Châteauguay from Châteauguay—Lacolle.

== Profile ==
The Bloc Québécois is more popular in the central and southern portions of the riding, in areas such as Saint-Constant, Sainte-Catherine, Delson and rural areas, with significant support in La Prairie. The Liberals are the main competitors to the Bloc, having won in 2015. Their support is concentrated in La Prairie and Candiac. The Mohawk reserve of Kahnawake is dominated by the Liberals and NDP, but turnout is generally low.

== Members of Parliament ==
This riding has elected the following members of Parliament:

Parliament	Years	Member	Party
Laprairie
1st	1867–1872	Alfred Pinsonneault	Conservative
2nd	1872–1874	Alfred Pinsonneault	Conservative
3rd	1874–1878	Alfred Pinsonneault	Conservative
4th	1878–1882	Alfred Pinsonneault	Conservative
5th	1882–1887	Alfred Pinsonneault	Conservative
6th	1887–1891	Cyrille Doyon	Independent Liberal
7th	1891–1896	Louis Conrad Pelletier	Conservative
Riding dissolved into Châteauguay and Laprairie—Napierville
Riding re-created from Beauharnois—Salaberry and Châteauguay—Huntingdon—Laprairie
28th	1968–1972	Ian Watson	Liberal
29th	1972–1974	Ian Watson	Liberal
30th	1974–1979	Ian Watson	Liberal
31st	1979–1980	Pierre Deniger	Liberal
La Prairie
32nd	1980–1984	Pierre Deniger	Liberal
33rd	1984–1988	Fernand Jourdenais	Progressive Conservative
34th	1988–1993	Fernand Jourdenais	Progressive Conservative
35th	1993–1997	Richard Bélisle	Bloc Québécois
Riding dissolved into Brossard—La Prairie and Saint-Lambert
Riding re-created from Brossard—La Prairie and Châteauguay—Saint-Constant
42nd	2015–2019	Jean-Claude Poissant	Liberal
43rd	2019–2021	Alain Therrien	Bloc Québécois
44th	2021–2025	Alain Therrien	Bloc Québécois
La Prairie—Atateken
45th	2025–present	Jacques Ramsay	Liberal

== Election results ==
=== La Prairie—Atateken, 2025-present ===
2025 Canadian federal election
Party	Candidate	Votes	%	±%
Liberal	Jacques Ramsay	29,418	44.06	+9.45
Bloc Québécois	Alain Therrien	23,232	34.80	-8.93
Conservative	Dave Pouliot	11,505	17.23	+7.29
New Democratic	Mathieu Boisvert	1,588	2.38	-4.92
Green	Barbara Joannette	657	0.98	-0.68
People's	Ruth Fontaine	361	0.54	-2.05
Total valid votes/expense limit		66,761	98.83	
Total rejected ballots		787	1.17	-0.37
Turnout		67,548	72.99	+5.20
Eligible voters		92,538		
Liberal notional gain from Bloc Québécois		Swing		+9.19
Source: Elections Canada
Note: number of eligible voters does not include voting day registrations.

=== La Prairie, 2015–2025 ===
2021 Canadian federal election: La Prairie
Party	Candidate	Votes	%	±%	Expenditures
Bloc Québécois	Alain Therrien	25,862	43.73	+1.9	$27,187.05
Liberal	Caroline Desrochers	20,470	34.61	-2.0	$64,263.73
Conservative	Lise des Greniers	5,878	9.94	+0.9	$4,378.21
New Democratic	Victoria Hernandez	4,317	7.30	-0.4	$24.86
People's	Ruth Fontaine	1,532	2.59	+2.0	$2,454.19
Green	Barbara Joannette	983	1.66	-2.5	$0.00
Marxist–Leninist	Normand Chouinard	98	0.17	±0.0	$0.00
Total valid votes/expense limit		59,140	98.46	–	$117,466.66
Total rejected ballots		924	1.54	1.17	
Turnout		60,064	67.79	-4.2	
Registered voters		88,603			
Source: Elections Canada

2019 Canadian federal election: La Prairie
Party	Candidate	Votes	%	±%	Expenditures
Bloc Québécois	Alain Therrien	25,707	41.8	+15.56	$16,299.46
Liberal	Jean-Claude Poissant	22,504	36.6	+0.14	$58,876.52
Conservative	Isabelle Lapointe	5,540	9.0	-2.91	none listed
New Democratic	Victoria Hernandez	4,744	7.7	-15.18	$0.10
Green	Barbara Joannette	2,565	4.2	+2.05	$362.15
People's	Gregory Yablunovsky	393	0.6	–	none listed
Marxist–Leninist	Normand Chouinard	100	0.2	-0.15	$0.00
Total valid votes/expense limit		61,553	100.0		
Total rejected ballots		886			
Turnout		62,439	71.95		
Eligible voters		86,779			
Bloc Québécois gain from Liberal		Swing		+7.71	
Source: Elections Canada

2015 Canadian federal election: La Prairie
Party	Candidate	Votes	%	±%	Expenditures
Liberal	Jean-Claude Poissant	20,993	36.46	+23.24	–
Bloc Québécois	Christian Picard	15,107	26.24	+0.51	–
New Democratic	Pierre Chicoine	13,174	22.88	-27.08	–
Conservative	Yves Perras	6,859	11.91	+2.46	–
Green	Joanne Tomas	1,235	2.15	+0.69	$43.49
Marxist–Leninist	Normand Chouinard	204	0.35	–	–
Total valid votes/expense limit		57,572	100.00		$218,081.80
Total rejected ballots		996	1.70	–	
Turnout		58,568	71.15	–	
Eligible voters		82,318			
Liberal gain from New Democratic		Swing		+25.16	
Source: Elections Canada

2011 federal election redistributed results
Party	Vote	%
New Democratic	25,308	50.0
Bloc Québécois	13,035	25.7
Conservative	6,697	13.2
Liberal	4,787	9.5
Green	736	1.5
Marxist–Leninist	91	0.2

=== La Prairie, 1980–1997 ===
1993 Canadian federal election: La Prairie
Party	Candidate	Votes
Bloc Québécois	Richard Bélisle	27,490
Liberal	Jacques Saada	27,014
Progressive Conservative	Fernand Jourdenais	7,852
New Democratic	Mohamed Akoum	708
Natural Law	Pierre Montpetit	691
Commonwealth of Canada	Alain Gauthier	200

1988 Canadian federal election: La Prairie
Party	Candidate	Votes
Progressive Conservative	Fernand Jourdenais	30,834
Liberal	Pierre Deniger	19,497
New Democratic	Bruce Katz	6,228
Rhinoceros	Marc-André Shakespeare Audet	1,378
Commonwealth of Canada	Alain Gauthier	186

1984 Canadian federal election: La Prairie
Party	Candidate	Votes
Progressive Conservative	Fernand Jourdenais	26,506
Liberal	Pierre Deniger	25,182
New Democratic	Lyse Chevalier-Grégoire	8,602
Rhinoceros	Monique Spazzola Fisicaro	1,851
Parti nationaliste	Marian Wecowski	1,373
Commonwealth of Canada	Jean-Pierre Gélineau	157

1980 Canadian federal election: La Prairie
Party	Candidate	Votes
Liberal	Pierre Deniger	36,842
New Democratic	Jean-Claude Bohrer	5,894
Progressive Conservative	Thérèse L'Écuyer	4,960
Rhinoceros	Jacques Ferron	1,868
Social Credit	Maurice Roy	948
Libertarian	David B. Chamberlain	297
Union populaire	Christian Labelle	222
Marxist–Leninist	Jocelyne Éthier	87
lop.parl.ca

=== Laprairie, 1966–1980 ===
1979 Canadian federal election: La Prairie
Party	Candidate	Votes
Liberal	Pierre Deniger	39,410
Progressive Conservative	Jacques Vasseur	6,576
Social Credit	Maurice Roy	4,461
New Democratic	Jean-Claude Bohrer	4,188
Rhinoceros	Jacques Cinq Cennes Marcotte	1,335
Libertarian	David Beaulieu Chamberlain	435
Union populaire	Christian Labelle	266
Marxist–Leninist	Jocelyne Éthier	121

1974 Canadian federal election: La Prairie
Party	Candidate	Votes
Liberal	Ian Watson	35,276
Progressive Conservative	Georges Brossard	12,767
New Democratic	Jean-Claude Bohrer	5,153
Social Credit	Aimé Coderre	3,855

1972 Canadian federal election: La Prairie
Party	Candidate	Votes
Liberal	Ian Watson	34,557
Progressive Conservative	Robert-F. Nelson	9,147
Social Credit	Marcellin Gagnon	7,315
New Democratic	Bernard Boulanger	5,261

1968 Canadian federal election: La Prairie
Party	Candidate	Votes
Liberal	Ian Watson	31,968
Progressive Conservative	H.-René Laberge	5,316
New Democratic	Yves Demers	3,551
Ralliement créditiste	Marcellin Gagnon	1,288

=== Laprairie, 1867–1892 ===
1891 Canadian federal election: La Prairie
Party	Candidate	Votes
Conservative	Louis Conrad Pelletier	970
Liberal	Cyrille Doyon	916

1887 Canadian federal election: La Prairie
Party	Candidate	Votes
Independent Liberal	Cyrille Doyon	917
Conservative	Joseph Tassé	894

1882 Canadian federal election: La Prairie
Party	Candidate	Votes
Conservative	Alfred Pinsonneault	675
Unknown	J.E. Robidoux	572

1878 Canadian federal election: La Prairie
Party	Candidate	Votes
Conservative	Alfred Pinsonneault	661
Unknown	T.A. Longtin	601

1874 Canadian federal election: La Prairie
Party	Candidate	Votes
Conservative	Alfred Pinsonneault	Acclaimed
Source: Canadian Elections Database

1872 Canadian federal election: La Prairie
Party	Candidate	Votes
Conservative	Alfred Pinsonneault	632
Unknown	J.-M. Loranger	563
Source: Canadian Elections Database

1867 Canadian federal election: La Prairie
Party	Candidate	Votes
Conservative	Alfred Pinsonneault	750
Unknown	M. Normandeau	293
Eligible voters		1,688
Source: Canadian Parliamentary Guide, 1871

== See also ==
- List of Canadian electoral districts
- Historical federal electoral districts of Canada
