= Fernand Jourdenais =

Canadian politician

Member of the Canadian Parliament for La Prairie
- In office 1984–1993
- Preceded by: Pierre Deniger
- Succeeded by: Richard Bélisle

Personal details
- Born: 25 March 1933 Montreal, Quebec
- Died: 29 February 2016 (aged 82)
- Party: Progressive Conservative
- Occupation: Businessman, trader

Fernand Jourdenais (25 March 1933 – 29 February 2016) was a Progressive Conservative member of the House of Commons of Canada. He was a businessman and trader by career.

He represented the Quebec riding of La Prairie where he was first elected in the 1984 federal election and re-elected in 1988, therefore becoming a member in the 33rd and 34th Canadian Parliaments.

Jourdenais left federal politics after his defeat in the 1993 federal election by Richard Bélisle of the Bloc Québécois party.

1988 Canadian federal election: La Prairie
Party	Candidate	Votes
Progressive Conservative	Fernand Jourdenais	30,834
Liberal	Pierre Deniger	19,497
New Democratic	Bruce Katz	6,228
Rhinoceros	Marc-André Shakespeare Audet	1,378
Commonwealth of Canada	Alain Gauthier	186

1984 Canadian federal election: La Prairie
Party	Candidate	Votes
Progressive Conservative	Fernand Jourdenais	26,506
Liberal	Pierre Deniger	25,182
New Democratic	Lyse Chevalier-Grégoire	8,602
Rhinoceros	Monique Spazzola Fisicaro	1,851
Parti nationaliste	Marian Wecowski	1,373
Commonwealth of Canada	Jean-Pierre Gélineau	157
