= Maka Kotto =

Canadian politician and actor (born 1961)

Member of the National Assembly of Quebec for Bourget
- In office May 12, 2008 – August 29, 2018
- Preceded by: Diane Lemieux
- Succeeded by: Richard Campeau

Member of the Canadian Parliament for Saint-Lambert
- In office June 28, 2004 – March 13, 2008
- Preceded by: Yolande Thibeault
- Succeeded by: Josée Beaudin

Personal details
- Born: December 7, 1961 (age 64) Douala, Cameroon
- Party: Bloc Québécois, Parti Québécois
- Spouse: Caroline St-Hilaire
- Children: 4
- Profession: Author, stage director

Léopold-Marcel Kotto-Maka (born December 7, 1961), known as Maka Kotto, is a Cameroonian-born Canadian politician and actor. Educated in France, Kotto immigrated to Quebec, Canada, where he was an educator before entering politics. Kotto was a Parti Québécois member of the National Assembly of Quebec for the riding of Bourget. From 2012 to 2014, he served as the Minister of Culture and Communications. A former member of the House of Commons of Canada for the Bloc Québécois, Kotto is also a published author and has appeared in films.

== Early life and education ==
Born in Douala, Cameroon, Léopold-Marcel Kotto-Maka graduated from high school at Lycée Henri-Martin in Saint-Quentin, France. He studied law, politics, dramatic art and cinema in Nanterre, Bordeaux and Paris. Kotto immigrated to Quebec in 1990.

Before becoming a politician, Kotto was an author, actor, and stage director. He appeared in the 1989 movie How to Make Love to a Negro Without Getting Tired (Comment faire l'amour avec un nègre sans se fatiguer), based on the novel by Dany Laferrière. He also appeared in a second film in 2000, Lumumba, starring as Joseph Kasa-Vubu.

Kotto was also an educator in dramatic art for nearly 15 years in France and Quebec.

== Federal political career ==
Kotto was elected to the House of Commons of Canada, representing the Bloc Québécois in the 2004 Canadian federal election. In that election, he defeated incumbent Liberal MP Yolande Thibeault and five other candidates. Upon winning the Saint-Lambert riding, Kotto became the first black Canadian Member of Parliament for the Bloc. He was re-elected two years later, winning a comfortable, but reduced, popular vote and a much larger plurality in the 2006 Canadian federal election. He defeated five other candidates to win his second term in office.

Kotto served as the Bloc's critic for Canadian heritage.

== Provincial political career ==
On November 12, 2007, Kotto announced that he would be the candidate for the Parti Québécois in the provincial riding of Bourget in Montreal to fill a vacancy created by the resignation of former PQ house leader Diane Lemieux. It was his second attempt at provincial politics; he was defeated in his previous candidacy in Viau by former Liberal MNA William Cusano.

Kotto resigned his seat in House of Commons of Canada on March 5, 2008, in order to run in the provincial by-election. His vacancy was officially recognized by the Speaker on March 13, 2008.

On May 12, 2008, he won the Bourget by-election as a Parti Québécois candidate with 40% of the vote.

With the election of the Parti Québécois on September 4, 2012, Kotto became Minister of Culture and Communications.

Kotto was re-elected in the 2014 Quebec election with a smaller margin, but the Parti Québécois government of Pauline Marois was defeated and Kotto became a member of the Official Opposition caucus. He was defeated in the 2018 election.

== Personal life ==
Kotto is the husband of former Longueuil mayor and Bloc Québécois caucus colleague Caroline St-Hilaire, and is the father of four children.

== Selected filmography ==
- How to Make Love to a Negro Without Getting Tired (Comment faire l'amour avec un nègre sans se fatiguer) - 1989
- The Night of the Visitor (La nuit du visiteur) - 1990
- Between the Devil and the Deep Blue Sea - 1995
- Beaumarchais - 1996
- The Caretaker's Lodge (La Conciergerie) - 1997
- Lumumba - 2000
- On Your Head (Le Ciel sur la tête) - 2001
- A Silent Love - 2004
- Looking for Alexander (Mémoires affectives) - 2004
- On the Verge of a Fever (Le Goût des jeunes filles) - 2004
- How to Conquer America in One Night (Comment conquérir l'Amérique en une nuit) - 2004
- Zim and Co. - 2005
- A Sunday in Kigali (Un dimanche à Kigali) - 2006

== Electoral record ==
2014 Quebec general election: Bourget
Party	Candidate	Votes	%	±%
Parti Québécois	Maka Kotto	12,525	37.78	-7.90
Liberal	Jean-Pierre Gagnon	9,567	28.86	+9.45
Coalition Avenir Québec	Sylvain Medza	6,510	19.64	-1.29
Québec solidaire	Gaétan Chateauneuf	3,714	11.20	+1.77
Green	Thomas Lapierre	489	1.48	-0.02
Option nationale	Diego Saavedra Renaud	243	0.73	-1.23
Marxist–Leninist	Claude Brunelle	101	0.30	+0.11
Total valid votes		33,149	98.29	–
Total rejected ballots		577	1.71	–
Turnout		33,726	68	+22.26
Electors on the lists		49,334	–	–

2012 Quebec general election: Bourget
Party	Candidate	Votes	%	±%
Parti Québécois	Maka Kotto	16,379	45.68	−4.51
Coalition Avenir Québec	Mario Bentrovato	7,503	20.93	+10.60
Liberal	Dave McMahon	6,960	19.41	−11.40
Québec solidaire	Patrice Gagnon	3,381	9.43	+4.88
Option nationale	Paolo Zambito	702	1.96	–
Green	Gilbert Caron	537	1.50	−2.12
Parti indépendantiste	Sylvie Tremblay	199	0.57	+0.08
Coalition pour la constituante	Jan Stohl	70	0.20	–
Marxist–Leninist	Claude Brunelle	68	0.19	–
Unité Nationale	Gaston Savard	57	0.16	–
Total valid votes		35,856	98.64	–
Total rejected ballots		495	1.36	–
Turnout		36,351	74%	−6.0
Electors on the lists		48,998	–	–

2008 Quebec general election: Bourget
Party	Candidate	Votes	%	±%
Parti Québécois	Maka Kotto	13,007	50.19	+9.53
Liberal	Pierre Mac Nicoll	7,984	30.81	−1.11
Action démocratique	Guy Boutin	2,677	10.33	+0.93
Québec solidaire	Gaétan Legault	1,180	4.55	+0.22
Green	Gilbert Caron	939	3.62	−7.75
Parti indépendantiste	Antonis Labbé	127	0.49	−1.84
Total valid votes		25,914	98.33	
Total rejected ballots		439	1.67	
Turnout		26,353	55.56	
Electors on the lists		47,434		
Source: Official Results, Le Directeur général des élections du Québec.

Quebec provincial by-election, May 12, 2008: Bourget
Party	Candidate	Votes	%	±%
Parti Québécois	Maka Kotto	6,575	40.66	−0.60
Liberal	Lyn Thériault	5,161	31.92	+9.07
Green	Scott McKay	1,839	11.37	+3.28
Action démocratique	Denis Mondor	1,520	9.40	−13.61
Québec solidaire	Gaétan Legault	700	4.33	+0.14
Parti indépendantiste	Richard Gervais	376	2.33	–
Total valid votes		16,171	99.01	–
Total rejected ballots		162	0.99	–
Turnout		16,333	34.55	−35.34
Electors on the lists		47,276	–	–
Source: Official Results, Le Directeur général des élections du Québec.

2006 Canadian federal election: Saint-Lambert
Party	Candidate	Votes	%	±%	Expenditures
Bloc Québécois	Maka Kotto	20,949	45.3	-3.5	$45,282
Liberal	Jean-Jacques Hermans	10,777	23.3	-13.6	$57,186
Conservative	Patrick Clune	9,097	19.7	+13.6	$36,940
New Democratic	Ronaldo Garcia	3,404	7.4	+2.6	$1,200
Green	Sonia Ziadé	1,819	3.9	+0.8	
Marxist–Leninist	Normand Fournier	196	0.4	+0.1	
Total valid votes/Expense limit		46,242	100.00	$77,306	
Total rejected ballots		562	1.2	-0.7	
Turnout		46,804			

2004 Canadian federal election: Saint-Lambert
Party	Candidate	Votes	%	±%	Expenditures
Bloc Québécois	Maka Kotto	22,024	48.8	+10.7	$44,877
Liberal	Yolande Thibeault	16,654	36.9	-8.5	$51,431
Conservative	Patrick Clune	2,739	6.1	-7.2	$16,096
New Democratic	Monique Garcia	2,130	4.7	–	$984
Green	Diane Joubert	1,404	3.1	–	
Marxist–Leninist	Normand Fournier	145	0.3	–	
Total valid votes/Expense limit		45,096	100.0	$77,333	
Total rejected ballots		861			
Turnout		45,957	1.9		

2003 Quebec general election: Viau
Party	Candidate	Votes	%	±%
Liberal	William Cusano	17,703	65.13	-4.95
Parti Québécois	Maka Kotto	6,142	22.60	–
Action démocratique	Paolo V. Tamburello	2,406	8.85	-10.61
Bloc Pot	Guillaume Blouin-Beaudoin	426	1.57	-4.66
UFP	Jocelyne Dupuis	384	1.41	–
No designation	Yannick Duguay	121	0.45	–

== Books ==
- Kotto, Maka. Femme : libre exaltation poétique. Outremont, Québec: Lanctôt, 2002. 93 p.; 21 cm. (Series: J'aime la poésie 12^{e}) ISBN 2-89485-213-4
