= Pierre Deniger =

Canadian politician

Member of the Canadian Parliament for Laprairie
- In office 1979–1984
- Preceded by: Ian Watson
- Succeeded by: Fernand Jourdenais

Personal details
- Born: 16 October 1947 Longueuil, Quebec, Canada
- Died: 13 April 1992 (aged 44)
- Party: Liberal
- Portfolio: Parliamentary Secretary to the Minister of State (Multiculturalism) (1980-1982)

Pierre Deniger (16 October 1947 – 13 April 1992) was a Liberal party member of the House of Commons of Canada. He was born in Longueuil, Quebec and became a businessman and lawyer by career.

He won the Laprairie electoral district in the 1979 federal election and was re-elected there in 1980. In the 1984 election, Deniger was defeated by Fernand Jourdenais of the Progressive Conservative party. Deniger also lost to Jourdenais in another attempt to win the riding in the 1988 election. He served in the 31st and 32nd Canadian Parliaments.

== Electoral record ==
1984 Canadian federal election: La Prairie
Party	Candidate	Votes
Progressive Conservative	Fernand Jourdenais	26,506
Liberal	Pierre Deniger	25,182
New Democratic	Lyse Chevalier-Grégoire	8,602
Rhinoceros	Monique Spazzola Fisicaro	1,851
Parti nationaliste	Marian Wecowski	1,373
Commonwealth of Canada	Jean-Pierre Gélineau	157

1980 Canadian federal election: La Prairie
Party	Candidate	Votes
Liberal	Pierre Deniger	36,842
New Democratic	Jean-Claude Bohrer	5,894
Progressive Conservative	Thérèse L'Écuyer	4,960
Rhinoceros	Jacques Ferron	1,868
Social Credit	Maurice Roy	948
Libertarian	David B. Chamberlain	297
Union populaire	Christian Labelle	222
Marxist–Leninist	Jocelyne Éthier	87
lop.parl.ca

1979 Canadian federal election: La Prairie
Party	Candidate	Votes
Liberal	Pierre Deniger	39,410
Progressive Conservative	Jacques Vasseur	6,576
Social Credit	Maurice Roy	4,461
New Democratic	Jean-Claude Bohrer	4,188
Rhinoceros	Jacques Cinq Cennes Marcotte	1,335
Libertarian	David Beaulieu Chamberlain	435
Union populaire	Christian Labelle	266
Marxist–Leninist	Jocelyne Éthier	121
