= Alain Therrien =

Canadian politician (born 1966)

Alain Therrien MNA

House Leader of the Bloc Québécois
- In office September 21, 2021 – April 28, 2025
- Leader: Yves-Francois Blanchet
- Succeeded by: Christine Normandin

Member of Parliament for La Prairie
- In office October 21, 2019 – March 23, 2025
- Preceded by: Jean-Claude Poissant
- Succeeded by: Jacques Ramsay

Member of the National Assembly of Quebec for Sanguinet
- Incumbent
- Assumed office October 5, 2026
- Preceded by: Christine Fréchette
- In office September 4, 2012 – October 18, 2018
- Preceded by: Riding established
- Succeeded by: Danielle McCann

Personal details
- Born: July 6, 1966 (age 60) Verdun, Quebec, Canada
- Party: Bloc Québécois
- Other political affiliations: Parti Québécois

Alain Therrien (French pronunciation: [alɛ̃ tɛʁjɛ̃]; born July 6, 1966) is a Canadian politician who was elected to represent the riding of La Prairie in the 2019 federal election as a member of the Bloc Québécois. Prior to entering federal politics, he served as a member of the National Assembly of Quebec for the riding of Sanguinet from 2012 to 2018 as a member of the Parti Québécois.

== Career ==
On June 17, 2020, Therrien was called a "racist" by New Democratic Party leader Jagmeet Singh after Therrien said no to a proposed motion to address systemic racism and discrimination in the RCMP; his position was the same as his party, which was to wait for the RCMP to conduct its own evaluation that is currently happening. Singh was subsequently removed from the House of Commons after refusing to apologize.

From 2021 to 2025 he served as the Bloc Québécois House Leader and critic for democratic institutions and single tax returns in the Shadow Cabinet.

In the 2025 Canadian federal election, he was unseated by Liberal candidate Jacques Ramsay.

He is a PQ MNA in the 2026 Quebec general election. Alain Therrien was appointed Minister responsible for Government Administration and Chair of the Treasury Board in the government of Paul St-Pierre Plamondon. He was also assigned responsibility for Community Action.

As Chair of the Treasury Board, the government initiated the transfer of responsibilities and personnel from the Ministry of Cybersecurity and Digital Affairs to the Treasury Board as part of a reorganization of government digital administration and cybersecurity.

== Electoral record ==
=== Federal ===
2025 Canadian federal election: La Prairie—Atateken
Party	Candidate	Votes	%	±%	Expenditures
Liberal	Jacques Ramsay	29,418	44.06	+9.45	$58,052.28
Bloc Québécois	Alain Therrien	23,232	34.80	–8.93	$34,973.64
Conservative	Dave Pouliot	11,505	17.23	+7.29	$3,919.05
New Democratic	Mathieu Boisvert	1,588	2.38	–4.92	$298.73
Green	Barbara Joannette	657	0.98	–0.68	$0.00
People's	Ruth Fontaine	361	0.54	–2.05	$0.00
Total valid votes/expense limit		66,761	98.83	+0.37	$138,301.93
Total rejected ballots		787	1.17	–0.37	
Turnout		67,548	72.99	+5.20	
Eligible voters		92,538			
Liberal notional gain from Bloc Québécois		Swing		+9.19	
Source: Elections Canada
Note: number of eligible voters does not include voting day registrations.

2021 Canadian federal election: La Prairie
Party	Candidate	Votes	%	±%	Expenditures
Bloc Québécois	Alain Therrien	25,862	43.73	+1.9	$27,187.05
Liberal	Caroline Desrochers	20,470	34.61	-2.0	$64,263.73
Conservative	Lise des Greniers	5,878	9.94	+0.9	$4,378.21
New Democratic	Victoria Hernandez	4,317	7.30	-0.4	$24.86
People's	Ruth Fontaine	1,532	2.59	+2.0	$2,454.19
Green	Barbara Joannette	983	1.66	-2.5	$0.00
Marxist–Leninist	Normand Chouinard	98	0.17	±0.0	$0.00
Total valid votes/expense limit		59,140	98.46	–	$117,466.66
Total rejected ballots		924	1.54	1.17	
Turnout		60,064	67.79	-4.2	
Registered voters		88,603			
Source: Elections Canada

2019 Canadian federal election: La Prairie
Party	Candidate	Votes	%	±%	Expenditures
Bloc Québécois	Alain Therrien	25,707	41.8	+15.56	$16,299.46
Liberal	Jean-Claude Poissant	22,504	36.6	+0.14	$58,876.52
Conservative	Isabelle Lapointe	5,540	9.0	-2.91	none listed
New Democratic	Victoria Hernandez	4,744	7.7	-15.18	$0.10
Green	Barbara Joannette	2,565	4.2	+2.05	$362.15
People's	Gregory Yablunovsky	393	0.6	–	none listed
Marxist–Leninist	Normand Chouinard	100	0.2	-0.15	$0.00
Total valid votes/expense limit		61,553	100.0		
Total rejected ballots		886			
Turnout		62,439	71.95		
Eligible voters		86,779			
Bloc Québécois gain from Liberal		Swing		+7.71	
Source: Elections Canada

=== Provincial ===
2026 Quebec general election: Sanguinet
** Preliminary results — Not yet official **
Party	Candidate	Votes	%	±%
Parti Québécois	Alain Therrien	13,331	41.59	
Liberal	Pinou Thong	6,110	19.06	
Conservative	Serge Benoit	5,008	15.62	
Coalition Avenir Québec	Jean Lacroix	4,590	14.32	
Québec solidaire	Virginie Bernier	2,877	8.98	
Bloc pot	Maxime Fournier	137	0.43	
Total valid votes				
Total rejected ballots				
Turnout			71.50	
Electors on the lists			–	–
Parti Québécois gain from Coalition Avenir Québec		Swing		+
Source: Élections Québec

2018 Quebec general election: Sanguinet
Party	Candidate	Votes	%	±%
Coalition Avenir Québec	Danielle McCann	12,986	43.54	+11.77
Parti Québécois	Alain Therrien	7,389	24.77	-10.29
Québec solidaire	Maya Fréchette-Bonnier	4,390	14.72	+11.25
Liberal	Marcelina Jugureanu	4,169	13.98	-11.38
Green	Antonino Geraci	456	1.53	
Conservative	Nikolai Grigoriev	355	1.19	+0.45
Marxist–Leninist	Hélène Héroux	81	0.27	-0.13
Total valid votes		29,826	97.98	
Total rejected ballots		616	2.02	
Turnout		30,442	72.45	
Eligible voters		42,016		
Coalition Avenir Québec gain from Parti Québécois		Swing		+11.03
Source(s) "Rapport des résultats officiels du scrutin". Élections Québec.

2014 Quebec general election
Party	Candidate	Votes	%	±%
Parti Québécois	Alain Therrien	10,096	35.06	-5.62
Coalition Avenir Québec	Denis Leftakis	9,147	31.77	-0.61
Liberal	Jean Paul Pellerin	7,301	25.36	+5.41
Québec solidaire	Christian Laramée	1,056	3.47	0.00
Option nationale	Robert Moreau	271	0.94	-0.38
Conservative	Alexandre Dagenais	213	0.74	-0.21
Marxist–Leninist	Hélène Héroux	116	0.40	+0.18
Total valid votes		28,794	97.92	
Total rejected ballots		613	2.08	
Turnout		29,407	74.15	
Electors on the lists		39,658		
Parti Québécois hold		Swing		-3.115

2014 results reference:

2012 Quebec general election
Party	Candidate	Votes	%	±%
Parti Québécois	Alain Therrien	12,384	40.68	
Coalition Avenir Québec	François Rebello	9,857	32.38	
Liberal	Jocelyne Bates	6,072	19.95	
Québec solidaire	Frédéric Nadeau	1,056	3.47	
Option nationale	Keven Rousseau	401	1.32	
(no designation)	Martin McNeil	315	1.04	
Conservative	André Martel	288	0.95	
Marxist–Leninist	Hélène Héroux	67	0.22	
Total valid votes		30,440	98.44	
Total rejected ballots		482	1.56	
Turnout		30,922	80.39	
Electors on the lists		38,464		

2012 results reference:
