= Sanguinet (electoral district) =

Provincial electoral district in Quebec, Canada

Coordinates: 45.325°N 73.588°W

Quebec electoral district

Provincial electoral district
- Legislature: National Assembly of Quebec
MNA
Alain Therrien
Parti Québécois
- District created: 2011
- First contested: 2012
- Last contested: 2026

Demographics
- Electors (2012): 38,350
- Area (km²): 182.8
- Census division(s): Les Jardins-de-Napierville (part), Roussillon (part)
- Census subdivision(s): Sainte-Catherine, Saint-Constant, Saint-Mathieu, Saint-Rémi

Sanguinet (French pronunciation: [sɑ̃ɡinɛ]) is a provincial electoral district in the Montérégie region of Quebec, Canada, which elects one member to the National Assembly of Quebec. It consists of the municipalities of Sainte-Catherine, Saint-Constant, Saint-Mathieu, and Saint-Rémi. Since 2026 its member of the National Assembly (MNA) has been Alain Therrien from the Parti Québécois (PQ). It was previously held by Christine Fréchette, who was the Premier of Quebec and leader of the Coalition Avenir Québec (CAQ) since April 2026.

== History ==
It was created for the 2012 election from parts of various other electoral districts: it took Sainte-Catherine from Châteauguay, Saint-Constant and Saint-Mathieu from La Prairie, and Saint-Rémi from Huntingdon.

== Members of the National Assembly ==
Legislature	Years	Member	Party
Riding created from Châteauguay, La Prairie and Huntington
40th	2012–2014	Alain Therrien	Parti Québécois
41st	2014–2018	Alain Therrien	Parti Québécois
42nd	2018–2022	Danielle McCann	Coalition Avenir Québec
43rd	2022–2026	Christine Fréchette	Coalition Avenir Québec
44th	2026–Present	Alain Therrien	Parti Québécois

== Election results ==
2026 Quebec general election
** Preliminary results — Not yet official **
Party	Candidate	Votes	%	±%
Parti Québécois	Alain Therrien	13,331	41.59	
Liberal	Pinou Thong	6,110	19.06	
Conservative	Serge Benoit	5,008	15.62	
Coalition Avenir Québec	Jean Lacroix	4,590	14.32	
Québec solidaire	Virginie Bernier	2,877	8.98	
Bloc pot	Maxime Fournier	137	0.43	
Total valid votes				
Total rejected ballots				
Turnout			71.50	
Electors on the lists			–	–
Parti Québécois gain from Coalition Avenir Québec		Swing		+
Source: Élections Québec

2022 Quebec general election
Party	Candidate	Votes	%	±%
Coalition Avenir Québec	Christine Fréchette	14,607	48.8	+5.26
Parti Québécois	Daphnée Paquin-Auger	4,882	16.3	-11.67
Québec solidaire	Virginie Bernier	3,925	13.1	-1.62
Conservative	François Gibeault	3,164	10.6	+9.41
Liberal	Rodrigue Asatsop	2,952	9.9	-4.08
Green	Halimatou Bah	325	1.1	-0.43
Climat Québec	Martine Lajoie	58	0.2	–
Marxist–Leninist	Hélène Héroux	31	0.1	-0.17
Total valid votes		29,944	–	
Total rejected ballots		417	–	
Turnout		30,361	69.8	-2.65
Electors on the lists			–	–
Coalition Avenir Québec hold		Swing		

2018 Quebec general election
Party	Candidate	Votes	%	±%
Coalition Avenir Québec	Danielle McCann	12,986	43.54	+11.77
Parti Québécois	Alain Therrien	7,389	24.77	-10.29
Québec solidaire	Maya Fréchette-Bonnier	4,390	14.72	+11.25
Liberal	Marcelina Jugureanu	4,169	13.98	-11.38
Green	Antonino Geraci	456	1.53	
Conservative	Nikolai Grigoriev	355	1.19	+0.45
Marxist–Leninist	Hélène Héroux	81	0.27	-0.13
Total valid votes		29,826	97.98	
Total rejected ballots		616	2.02	
Turnout		30,442	72.45	
Eligible voters		42,016		
Coalition Avenir Québec gain from Parti Québécois		Swing		+11.03
Source(s) "Rapport des résultats officiels du scrutin". Élections Québec.

2014 Quebec general election
Party	Candidate	Votes	%	±%
Parti Québécois	Alain Therrien	10,096	35.06	-5.62
Coalition Avenir Québec	Denis Leftakis	9,147	31.77	-0.61
Liberal	Jean Paul Pellerin	7,301	25.36	+5.41
Québec solidaire	Christian Laramée	1,056	3.47	0.00
Option nationale	Robert Moreau	271	0.94	-0.38
Conservative	Alexandre Dagenais	213	0.74	-0.21
Marxist–Leninist	Hélène Héroux	116	0.40	+0.18
Total valid votes		28,794	97.92	
Total rejected ballots		613	2.08	
Turnout		29,407	74.15	
Electors on the lists		39,658		
Parti Québécois hold		Swing		-3.115

2014 results reference:

2012 Quebec general election
Party	Candidate	Votes	%	±%
Parti Québécois	Alain Therrien	12,384	40.68	
Coalition Avenir Québec	François Rebello	9,857	32.38	
Liberal	Jocelyne Bates	6,072	19.95	
Québec solidaire	Frédéric Nadeau	1,056	3.47	
Option nationale	Keven Rousseau	401	1.32	
(no designation)	Martin McNeil	315	1.04	
Conservative	André Martel	288	0.95	
Marxist–Leninist	Hélène Héroux	67	0.22	
Total valid votes		30,440	98.44	
Total rejected ballots		482	1.56	
Turnout		30,922	80.39	
Electors on the lists		38,464		

2012 results reference:

== See also ==
- List of Quebec provincial electoral districts
- Canadian provincial electoral districts
