= Jacques Ramsay =

Canadian politician

Jacques Ramsay MP

Parliamentary Secretary to the Minister of Public Safety
- Incumbent
- Assumed office June 5, 2025

Member of Parliament for La Prairie—Atateken
- Incumbent
- Assumed office April 28, 2025
- Preceded by: Alain Therrien

Personal details
- Party: Liberal
- Website: jacquesramsay.liberal.ca

Jacques Ramsay MP is a Canadian politician from the Liberal Party of Canada. He was elected Member of Parliament for La Prairie—Atateken in the 2025 Canadian federal election. He defeated Alain Therrien, who was house leader for the Bloc Québécois.

Before politics, he was a family doctor in Montreal's South Shore. At the time of the 2025 Canadian federal election, he lived in Boucherville.

== Electoral record ==
2025 Canadian federal election: La Prairie—Atateken
Party	Candidate	Votes	%	±%	Expenditures
Liberal	Jacques Ramsay	29,418	44.06	+9.45	$58,052.28
Bloc Québécois	Alain Therrien	23,232	34.80	–8.93	$34,973.64
Conservative	Dave Pouliot	11,505	17.23	+7.29	$3,919.05
New Democratic	Mathieu Boisvert	1,588	2.38	–4.92	$298.73
Green	Barbara Joannette	657	0.98	–0.68	$0.00
People's	Ruth Fontaine	361	0.54	–2.05	$0.00
Total valid votes/expense limit		66,761	98.83	+0.37	$138,301.93
Total rejected ballots		787	1.17	–0.37	
Turnout		67,548	72.99	+5.20	
Eligible voters		92,538			
Liberal notional gain from Bloc Québécois		Swing		+9.19	
Source: Elections Canada
Note: number of eligible voters does not include voting day registrations.
