= Sadia Groguhé =

Canadian politician

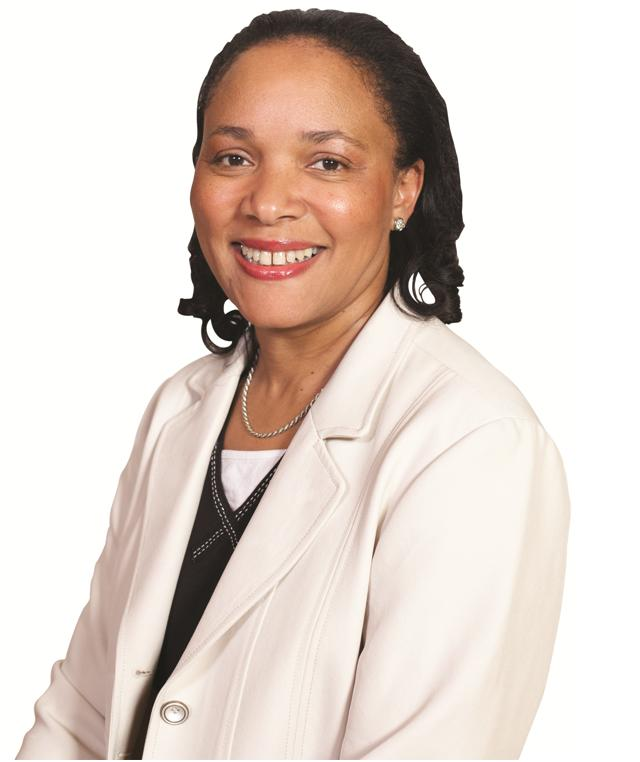

Member of Parliament for Saint-Lambert
- In office May 2, 2011 – October 19, 2015
- Preceded by: Josée Beaudin

Personal details
- Born: November 9, 1962 (age 63) Istres, France
- Party: New Democratic Party
- Children: 4
- Profession: Guidance counselor

Sadia Groguhé (Arabic: ساديا جروغوه; born November 9, 1962) is a French-Canadian politician of Algerian descent. A municipal councillor in the French city of Istres from 1995 to 2000, Groguhé and her husband immigrated to Canada in 2005.

In the 2011 federal election, she was elected to the House of Commons of Canada as the Member of Parliament for the electoral district of Saint-Lambert under the banner of the New Democratic Party. She was defeated for reelection in the new electoral district of Longueuil—Charles-LeMoyne in the 2015 election.

== Early life and French political career in ==
Groguhé was born on November 9, 1962, in Istres, France, to Algerian immigrants, one of twelve children. She has a Master's degree, practiced as a psychologist, and did community work.

In France, she worked in the area of social and occupational integration for youth and adults in distress. Trained in transactional analysis as a therapeutic tool, she held sessions as a trainer. Groguhé was chair of the Istres equality association.

Groguhé ran as an independent candidate in 1994’s cantonal election. Noticed by Jacques Siffre, Istres’ socialist mayor, she ran municipally in 1995. Groguhé was elected and was a municipal councillor from 1995 to 2000. She was responsible for integration, and left her position after the birth of her children.

Groguhé and her husband, who is originally from the Ivory Coast, decided to leave France so their children would not be discriminated against because of their background. They submitted their visa requests in 2003 and immigrated to Canada in 2005.

== Canadian politics ==
=== 2011 election and tenure ===
Naturalized as a Canadian citizen in 2010, Groguhé joined the New Democratic Party. She was a candidate for the party in the 2011 federal election in the Montreal riding of Saint-Lambert and defeated the incumbent Bloc MP, Josée Beaudin, with 42.65% of the vote.

After her election, Groguhé was appointed the NDP’s assistant critic for immigration, citizenship, and multiculturalism. During her parliamentary tenure, Groguhé advocated for modernizing the immigration application system.

From April 19, 2012, to August 12, 2013, Groguhé was the Deputy House Leader of the NDP and the Official Opposition. She then became the NDP's Deputy Whip, which meant she was also the Official Opposition Deputy Whip, and gave up the assistant critic portfolios she had held since 2011.

In June 2014, the Board of Internal Economy found that a group of NDP MPs, including Groguhé, had improperly used Parliamentary resources for partisan activities by sending out nearly two million mass mailings, costing 1.17 million dollars to different ridings, including some that were holding by-elections at the time. Groguhé kept the deputy whip position until she lost her bid for re-election in the new riding of Longueuil—Saint-Hubert in the 2015 federal election.

=== Party politics ===
Following Jack Layton's death, she supported Thomas Mulcair in the 2012 NDP leadership race. In the 2017 leadership contest, Groguhé was a supporter of Peter Julian prior to his exit from the race.

=== Post-federal politics ===
Following her defeat, Groguhé became a guidance counselor. Groguhé announced in April 2017 that she is running for Mayor of Longueuil in the 2017 Quebec municipal election. She finished third with 14.7% of the vote.

== Personal life ==
Groguhé is the mother of four children, and is married.

== Electoral record ==
2015 Canadian federal election: Longueuil—Charles-LeMoyne
Party	Candidate	Votes	%	±%	Expenditures
Liberal	Sherry Romanado	18,301	35.39	+22.07	$26,644.67
Bloc Québécois	Philippe Cloutier	13,974	27.03	-1.27	$54,305.34
New Democratic	Sadia Groguhé	12,468	24.11	-21.32	–
Conservative	Thomas Barré	4,961	9.59	-0.94	–
Green	Mario Leclerc	1,510	2.92	+0.51	$6,229.28
Rhinoceros	Matthew Iakov Liberman	325	0.63	–	–
Marxist–Leninist	Pierre Chénier	168	0.32	–	–
Total valid votes/Expense limit		51,707	100.00		$220,839.26
Total rejected ballots		925	1.76	–	
Turnout		52,632	62.87	–	
Eligible voters		83,719			
Liberal gain from New Democratic		Swing		+21.70	
Source: Elections Canada

2011 Canadian federal election: Saint-Lambert
Party	Candidate	Votes	%	±%	Expenditures
New Democratic	Sadia Groguhé	18,705	42.64	+28.19	
Bloc Québécois	Josée Beaudin	11,353	25.88	-11.74	
Liberal	Roxane Stanners	8,463	19.29	-9.21	
Conservative	Qais Hamidi	4,396	10.02	-5.78	
Green	Carmen Budilean	944	2.15	-1.45	
Total valid votes/Expense limit		43,861	100.0		
Total rejected ballots		584	1.31	+0.14	
Turnout		44,445	60.60	+1.15	
