= Cyrille Doyon =

Canadian politician

Member of the Canadian Parliament for Laprairie
- In office 1887–1891
- Preceded by: Alfred Pinsonneault
- Succeeded by: Louis Conrad Pelletier

Member of the Legislative Assembly of Quebec for Laprairie
- In office 1892–1897
- Preceded by: Georges Duhamel
- Succeeded by: Côme-Séraphin Cherrier

Personal details
- Born: October 28, 1842 Saint-Isidore, Canada East
- Died: January 7, 1918 (aged 75) Montreal, Quebec
- Party: Independent Liberal

Cyrille Doyon (October 28, 1842 – January 7, 1918) was a Quebec merchant, farmer and political figure. He represented Laprairie in the House of Commons of Canada from 1887 to 1891 as an independent Liberal and Laprairie in the Legislative Assembly of Quebec from 1892 to 1897 as a Conservative member.

He was born in St-Isidore, Canada East, the son of Antoine Doyon and Marie-Archange Pépin dit Lachance, and was educated at the Collège de Montréal. Doyan was a justice of the peace and an inspector for the Farmers' Assurance Company and for the Sovereign Assurance Company. In 1869, he married Vitaline Riopel. Doyon served as mayor of Saint-Isidore from 1874 to 1876. He established the first butter factory in Saint-Isidore in 1885. Doyon was defeated when he ran for reelection to the House of Commons in 1891 and when he ran for reelection to the Quebec assembly in 1897. He moved to Montreal in 1898. Doyon died there at the age of 75 and was buried in the Notre-Dame-des-Neiges Cemetery.

== Electoral record ==
1891 Canadian federal election: La Prairie
Party	Candidate	Votes
Conservative	Louis Conrad Pelletier	970
Liberal	Cyrille Doyon	916

1887 Canadian federal election: La Prairie
Party	Candidate	Votes
Independent Liberal	Cyrille Doyon	917
Conservative	Joseph Tassé	894
