= Josée Beaudin =

Canadian politician (born 1961)

Member of Parliament for Saint-Lambert
- In office 2008–2011
- Preceded by: Maka Kotto
- Succeeded by: Sadia Groguhé

Personal details
- Born: December 20, 1961 (age 64) Saint-Lambert, Quebec
- Party: Bloc Québécois
- Profession: Administrator

Josée Beaudin (born December 20, 1961) is a Canadian politician who was elected to represent the electoral district of Saint-Lambert in the 2008 Canadian federal election. A member of the Bloc Québécois, she was defeated for reelection in 2011 by Sadia Groguhé of the New Democratic Party.
