= Côme-Séraphin Cherrier (Quebec politician) =

Canadian politician

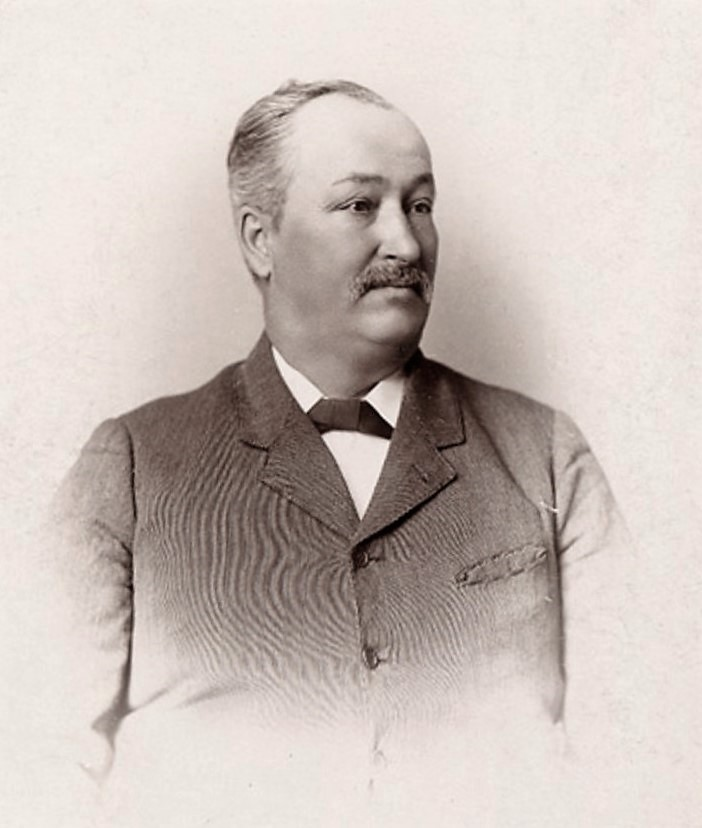

Member of the Legislative Assembly of Quebec for Laprairie
- In office 1897–1908
- Preceded by: Cyrille Doyon
- Succeeded by: Esioff-Léon Patenaude

Personal details
- Born: 4 April 1848 Sainte-Philomène-de-Châteauguay (today Mercier), Canada East
- Died: 29 November 1912 (aged 64) La Prairie, Quebec
- Party: Liberal

Côme-Séraphin Cherrier (4 April 1848 – 29 November 1912) was a member of the Legislative Assembly of Quebec.

He was first elected to the Legislative Assembly in the 1897 Quebec general election for the Quebec Liberal Party in Laprairie electoral district. He was re-elected in 1900 and 1904, but was defeated in 1908.
