= Venturini Motorsports =

Former American stock car racing team

- Owner(s): Bill Venturini; Billy Venturini; Cathy Venturini
- Base: Concord, North Carolina
- Series: ARCA Menards Series; ARCA Menards Series East; ARCA Menards Series West
- Race drivers: ARCA Menards Series: 15. Chase Pinsonneault, Treyten Lapcevich, Patrick Staropoli (part-time); 20. Lawless Alan, Leland Honeyman; 25. Jake Finch, Patrick Staropoli, Corey Heim, Mason Mitchell; 55. Isabella Robusto; ARCA Menards Series East: 15. Kris Wright; 20. Lawless Alan, Jake Finch, Leland Honeyman; 25. Patrick Staropoli, Jake Finch, Mason Mitchell; 55. Isabella Robusto (part-time); ARCA Menards Series West: 15. Treyten Lapcevich, Thomas Annunziata (part-time); 20. Lawless Alan, Jade Avedisian (part-time); 25. Patrick Staropoli, Alon Day, Taylor Reimer (part-time); 55. Isabella Robusto (part-time)
- Manufacturer: Toyota

Career
- Debut: 1982
- Latest race: 2025
- Races competed: 1560
- Drivers' Championships: Total: 6 ARCA Menards Series: 4 ARCA Menards Series West: 2
- Race victories: Total: 110; ARCA Menards Series: 98; ARCA Menards Series West: 7 ARCA Menards Series East: 3
- Pole positions: 108

Venturini Motorsports was an American professional stock car racing team that competed in the ARCA Menards Series, ARCA Menards Series East, and ARCA Menards Series West. Founded in 1982 by Bill Venturini Sr., Venturini Motorsports was the longest continually operated ARCA racing team in the United States. The team was based in Concord, North Carolina.

The team announced on April 18, 2025 that they will shut down their operations, transferring the ownership to Nitro Motorsports beginning on October 15.

== History ==
Venturini Motorsports was formed by Bill Venturini Sr., a former NASCAR driver, two-time ARCA Racing Series Champion (1987 and 1991), and 1983 ARCA Rookie of the Year. Largely influenced by his father Tony Venturini, Bill founded the racing team in 1982. The team is family-owned and operated, with various members of the Venturini family holding positions on the team, including CEO, CFO, General Manager, and Director of Marketing and Public Relations. In 2007, Bill's son Billy helped found the Venturini Driver Development Program, one of the largest such programs for ARCA drivers in the United States.

On April 18, 2025, it was announced that the team would be sold to Nitro Motorsports after the 2025 season. The transfer date would be October 15.

== Cup Series ==
Bill Venturini drove the No. 35 Chevrolet with Rain-X as a sponsor to make its Winston Cup debut at Michigan in 1989, where he started 38th and finished 37th. Between 1982 and 1995, the team had made select starts in the Winston Cup Series, Busch Series, and Craftsman Truck Series with Bill Venturini behind the wheel.

=== Car No. 35 results ===
NASCAR Winston Cup Series results
Year	Driver	No.	Make	1	2	3	4	5	6	7	8	9	10	11	12	13	14	15	16	17	18	19	20	21	22	23	24	25	26	27	28	29	30	31	NWCC	Pts	Ref
1989	Bill Venturini	35	Chevy	DAY	CAR	ATL	RCH	DAR	BRI	NWS	MAR	TAL	CLT	DOV	SON	POC	MCH; 37	DAY	POC	TAL	GLN	MCH	BRI	DAR	RCH	DOV	MAR	CLT	NWS	CAR	PHO	ATL			100th	52	
1990	Bill Venturini	35	Chevy	DAY; DNQ	RCH	CAR	ATL	DAR	BRI	NWS	MAR	TAL; 18	CLT; DNQ	DOV	SON	POC	MCH; 30	DAY	POC	TAL; 25	GLN	MCH; 28	BRI	DAR	RCH	DOV	MAR	NWS	CLT; DNQ	CAR	PHO	ATL			45th	349	
1991	Bill Venturini	35	Chevy	DAY; DNQ	RCH	CAR	ATL	DAR	BRI	NWS	MAR	TAL	CLT	DOV	SON	POC	MCH; 40	DAY	POC; 39	TAL	GLN	MCH	BRI	DAR	RCH	DOV	MAR	NWS	CLT	CAR	PHO	ATL; DNQ			74th	89	
1992	Bill Venturini	35	Chevy	DAY	CAR	RCH	ATL	DAR	BRI	NWS	MAR	TAL	CLT	DOV	SON	POC	MCH; DNQ	DAY	POC	TAL	GLN	MCH; DNQ	BRI	DAR	RCH	DOV	MAR	NWS	CLT	CAR	PHO	ATL			NA	-	
1993	Bill Venturini	35	Chevy	DAY	CAR	RCH	ATL	DAR	BRI	NWS	MAR	TAL	SON	CLT	DOV	POC	MCH	DAY; DNQ	NHA	POC	TAL	GLN	MCH	BRI	DAR	RCH	DOV	MAR	NWS	CLT; DNQ	CAR	PHO	ATL		NA	-	
1994	Bill Venturini	35	Chevy	DAY	CAR	RCH	ATL	DAR	BRI	NWS	MAR	TAL	SON	CLT	DOV	POC	MCH	DAY	NHA	POC	TAL	IND	GLN	MCH	BRI	DAR	RCH	DOV	MAR	NWS	CLT	CAR	PHO	ATL; DNQ	NA	-	

==== Daytona 500 ====
Year	Driver	Manufacturer	Start	Finish
1990	Bill Venturini	Chevrolet	DNQ	
1991	Bill Venturini	Chevrolet	DNQ	

== Xfinity Series ==
=== Car No. 35 results ===
NASCAR Busch Series results
Year	Driver	No.	Make	1	2	3	4	5	6	7	8	9	10	11	12	13	14	15	16	17	18	19	20	21	22	23	24	25	26	27	28	29	30	31	32	33	34	35	NBSC	Pts	Ref
1982	Bill Venturini	35	Buick	DAY; 13	RCH	BRI	MAR	DAR	HCY	SBO	CRW	RCH	LGY	DOV	HCY	CLT	ASH	HCY	SBO	CAR	CRW	SBO	HCY	LGY	IRP	BRI	HCY	RCH	MAR	CLT	HCY	MAR							126th	124	
1983	Bill Venturini	65	Pontiac	DAY; 24	RCH	CAR	HCY	MAR	NWS	SBO	GPS	LGY	DOV	BRI	CLT	SBO	HCY	ROU	SBO	ROU	CRW	ROU	SBO	HCY	LGY	IRP	GPS	BRI	HCY	DAR	RCH	NWS	SBO	MAR	ROU	CLT	HCY	MAR	130th	91	
1984	Bill Venturini	35	Pontiac	DAY	RCH	CAR	HCY	MAR	DAR	ROU	NSV	LGY	MLW; 11	DOV	CLT	SBO	HCY	ROU	SBO	ROU	HCY	IRP	LGY	SBO	BRI	DAR	RCH	NWS	CLT	HCY	CAR	MAR							113th	-	
1985	Bill Venturini	35	Pontiac	DAY	CAR	HCY	BRI	MAR	DAR	SBO	LGY	DOV	CLT	SBO	HCY	ROU	IRP; 21	SBO	LGY	HCY	MLW	BRI	DAR	RCH	NWS	ROU	CLT	HCY	CAR	MAR									103rd	-	

=== Car No. 25 history ===
In 2013, the team made its return to the Nationwide Series with driver John Wes Townley and sponsor Zaxby's on the 25 Toyota Camry. The team planned to run at Bristol, Charlotte, and Talladega with the possibility of up to eight more races. Townley finished 17th in his debut at Bristol, crashed at Charlotte, and failed to qualify at Talladega.

=== Car No. 25 results ===
NASCAR Xfinity Series results
Year	Driver	No.	Make	1	2	3	4	5	6	7	8	9	10	11	12	13	14	15	16	17	18	19	20	21	22	23	24	25	26	27	28	29	30	31	32	33	34	35	NXSC	Pts	Ref
2013	John Wes Townley	25	Toyota	DAY	PHO	LVS	BRI; 17	CAL	TEX	RCH	TAL; DNQ	DAR	CLT; 35	DOV	IOW	MCH	ROA	KEN	DAY	NHA	CHI	IND	IOW	GLN	MOH	BRI	ATL	RCH	CHI	KEN	DOV	KAN	CHA	TEX	PHO	HOM			114th	0^{1}	

== Craftsman Truck Series ==
Bill Venturini attempted three races in the No. 35 between 1995 and 1996, qualifying for two of them. It was announced in August 2014 that Venturini would return to the Camping World Truck Series on a part-time basis for the starting at Bristol with ARCA driver Justin Boston and his sponsor Zloop. Team owner Billy Venturini himself would serve as Boston's crew chief. Boston qualified 27th and finished 30th after a crash. The team planned to run the final three races of the season in preparation for a full-time effort in 2015, but those plans were scrapped when sponsor Zloop shifted their focus to the next season.

Boston and Zloop would move to Kyle Busch Motorsports for 2015. In addition, Venturini would field the No. 25 truck in select races for KBM driver Matt Tifft, Joe Gibbs Racing driver Cody Coughlin, and Venturini road course specialist Brian Wong. The team has not made any scheduled races in 2016.

=== Car No. 35 results ===
NASCAR Craftsman Truck Series results
Year	Driver	No.	Make	1	2	3	4	5	6	7	8	9	10	11	12	13	14	15	16	17	18	19	20	21	22	23	24	NCTC	Pts	Ref
1995	Bill Venturini	35	Chevy	PHO	TUS	SGS	MMR	POR	EVG	I70	LVL	BRI	MLW	CNS	HPT	IRP	FLM	RCH	MAR	NWS; DNQ	SON	MMR	PHO; 34					78th	116	
1996	Bill Venturini	35	Chevy	HOM	PHO	POR	EVG	TUS	CNS	HPT	BRI	NZH	MLW; 31	LVL	I70	IRP	FLM	GLN	NSV	RCH	NHA	MAR	NWS	SON	MMR	PHO	LVS	119th	70	

=== Car No. 25 results ===
NASCAR Craftsman Truck Series results
Year	Driver	No.	Make	1	2	3	4	5	6	7	8	9	10	11	12	13	14	15	16	17	18	19	20	21	22	23	NCTC	Pts	Ref
2014	Justin Boston	25	Toyota	DAY	MAR	KAN	CLT	DOV	TEX	GTW	KEN	IOW	ELD	POC	MCH	BRI; 30	MSP	CHI	NHA	LVS	TAL	MAR	TEX	PHO	HOM		82nd	14	
2015	Matt Tifft	25	Toyota	DAY; 19	ATL	MAR; 9	KAN; 29	CLT	DOV	TEX	GTW	IOW	KEN	ELD	POC	MCH	BRI										36th	107	
2015	Brian Wong	25	Toyota															MSP; 12	CHI	NHA	LVS	TAL	MAR	TEX	PHO	HOM	36th	107	

== ARCA Menards Series ==
Venturini Motorsports competed in the ARCA Menards Series. Various NASCAR Cup Series drivers, including Joey Logano, Ryan Blaney, Alex Bowman, William Byron, Erik Jones and Daniel Suárez, were former drivers for Venturini Motorsports.

=== Car No. 8 history ===
Marc Davis (2008)

Marc Davis drove the No. 8 in one race in 2008.

=== Car No. 14 history ===
Tom Berte (2008)

Tom Berte drove a No. 14 for one race in 2008.

=== Car No. 15 history ===
Multiple Drivers (2008)

The No. 15 drove in six races in 2008, all with different drivers, including the 2018, 2022and 2024 NASCAR Cup Series champion, Joey Logano.

Multiple Drivers (2010-2018)

Venturini entered the No. 15 for eighteen races in 2010 and sixteen races in 2011. Ryan Reed drove fourteen of the nineteen races from the No. 15 in 2012. Kyle Benjamin and John Wes Townley drove eleven of the twenty-one races in 2013 for the No. 15. Townley would end up driving fifteen of the twenty races in the No. 15 in 2014. Only eight races in 2015 entered the No. 15. Daniel Suárez and even the legendary Frank Kimmel drove it. Sixteen races entered the No. 15 in 2016. For 2017, soon-to-be the 2019 series champion, Christian Eckes drove the No. 15 with other drivers. 2018 had twenty races run.

Christian Eckes (2019)

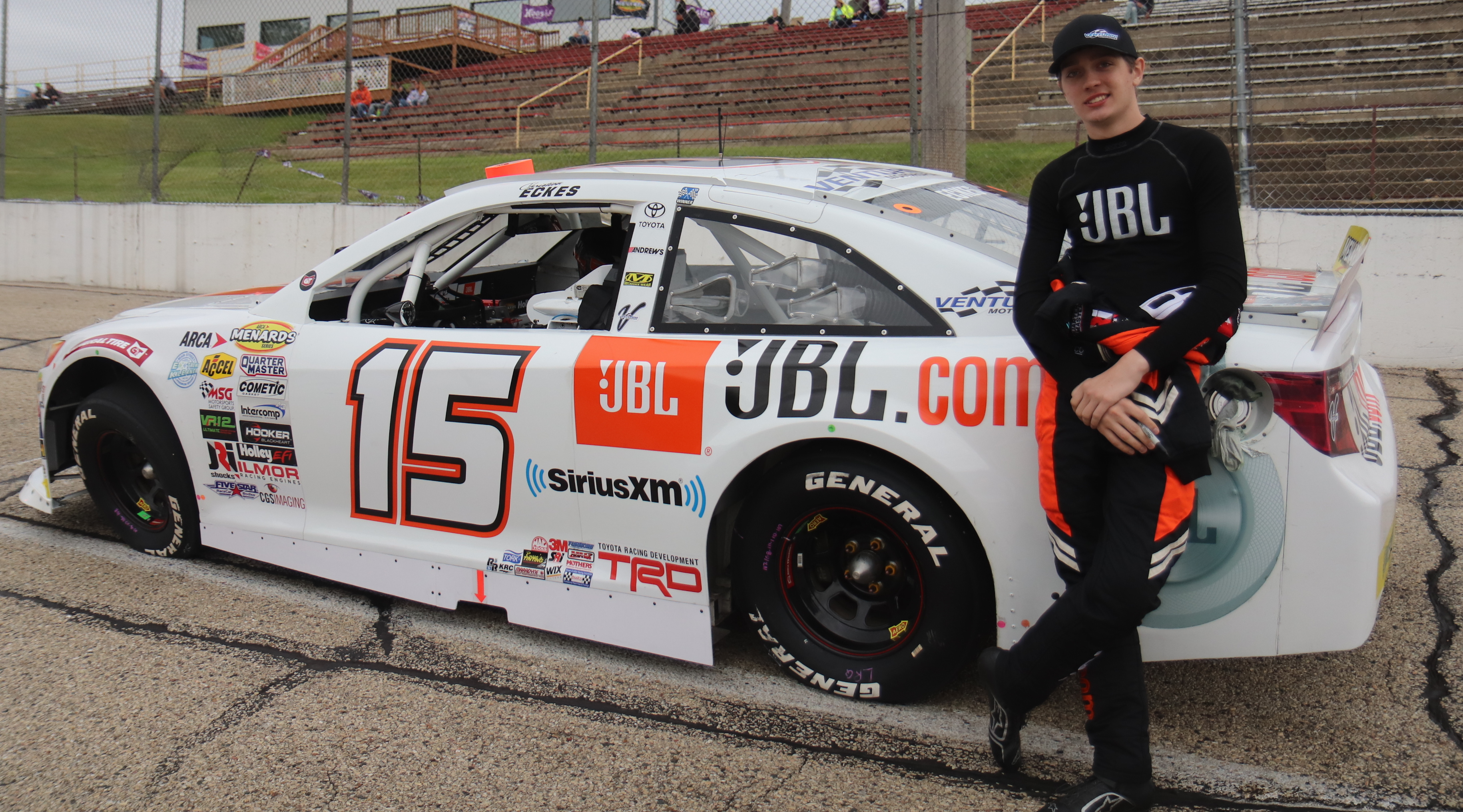
Christian Eckes next to his No. 15 car at Madison International Speedway in 2019

Eckes drove the No. 15 car to a championship in 2019. He became the first driver since Tim Steele in 1997 to win a championship while missing a race because Harrison Burton raced one race in the No. 15 while Eckes drove the other nineteen.

Drew Dollar (2020)

After Eckes was promoted to the NASCAR Gander RV & Outdoors Truck Series in 2020, Drew Dollar was promoted from the West Series to the ARCA Menards Series in 2020, finishing third and fourteenth in the first two races before the 2019-20 coronavirus pandemic stopped NASCAR from being public. Though he won at Talladega and finished fourth in points, he left to drive part-time in the Truck Series and part-time here.

Multiple Drivers (2021-2023)

Drew Dollar is slated to run 11 national series raced in 2021. Gracie Trotter was promoted from the ARCA West Series to the ARCA Menards Series on a part-time schedule for 5 races.

In 2022, Parker Chase, Gus Dean, Jonathan Shafer, and Landon Pembelton will split the seat time.

In 2023, Sean Hingorani competed in eight races with the rest of the schedule split between numerous drivers such as Kris Wright, Toni Breidinger, and Amber Balcaen.

Kris Wright (2024)

For the 2024 season, Kris Wright signed on to pilot the No. 15 for the entire season. Wright would go on to have a solid season, finishing third in the points standings with eight Top 5s and twelve Top 10s.

Multiple Drivers (2025)

The No. 15 was shared by multiple drivers for 2025.

=== Car No. 20 history ===
Multiple Drivers (2017–2020)

Zane Smith and Tom Berte both drove the No. 20 in three races with Smith driving two and Berte one. Drivers such as Leilani Münter and Chandler Smith drove the No. 20 in 2018. Five drivers shared the No. 20 in 2019. Ryan Repko and Chandler Smith shared the No. 20 in 2020.

Corey Heim (2021)

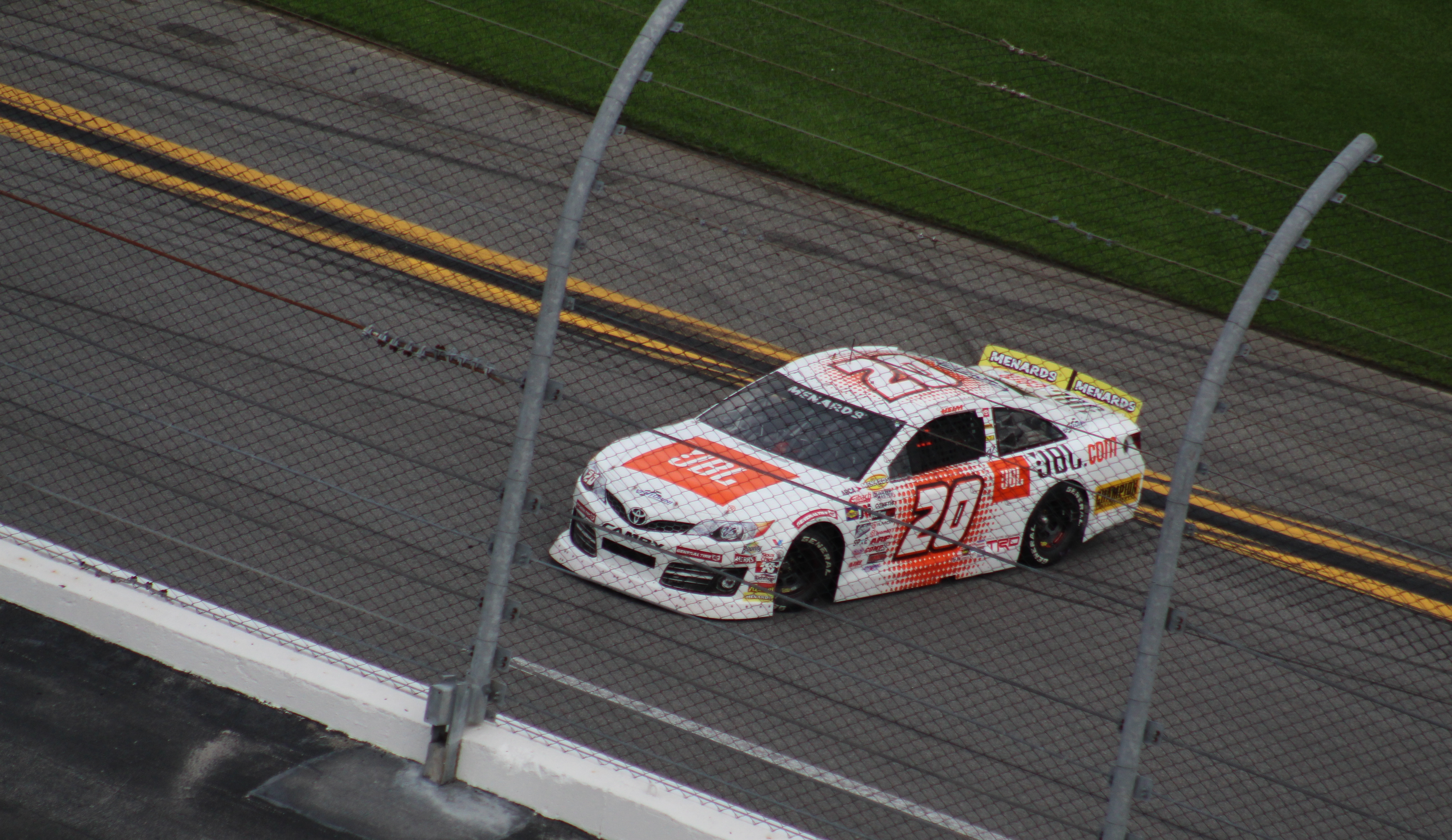
Corey Heim's No. 20 after winning the 2021 Lucas Oil 200

Corey Heim drove the 20 full-time in 2021. Corey won the Lucas Oil 200 (ARCA) that year. Heim would go on to win six races and finish second in the points standings.

Jesse Love (2022-2023)

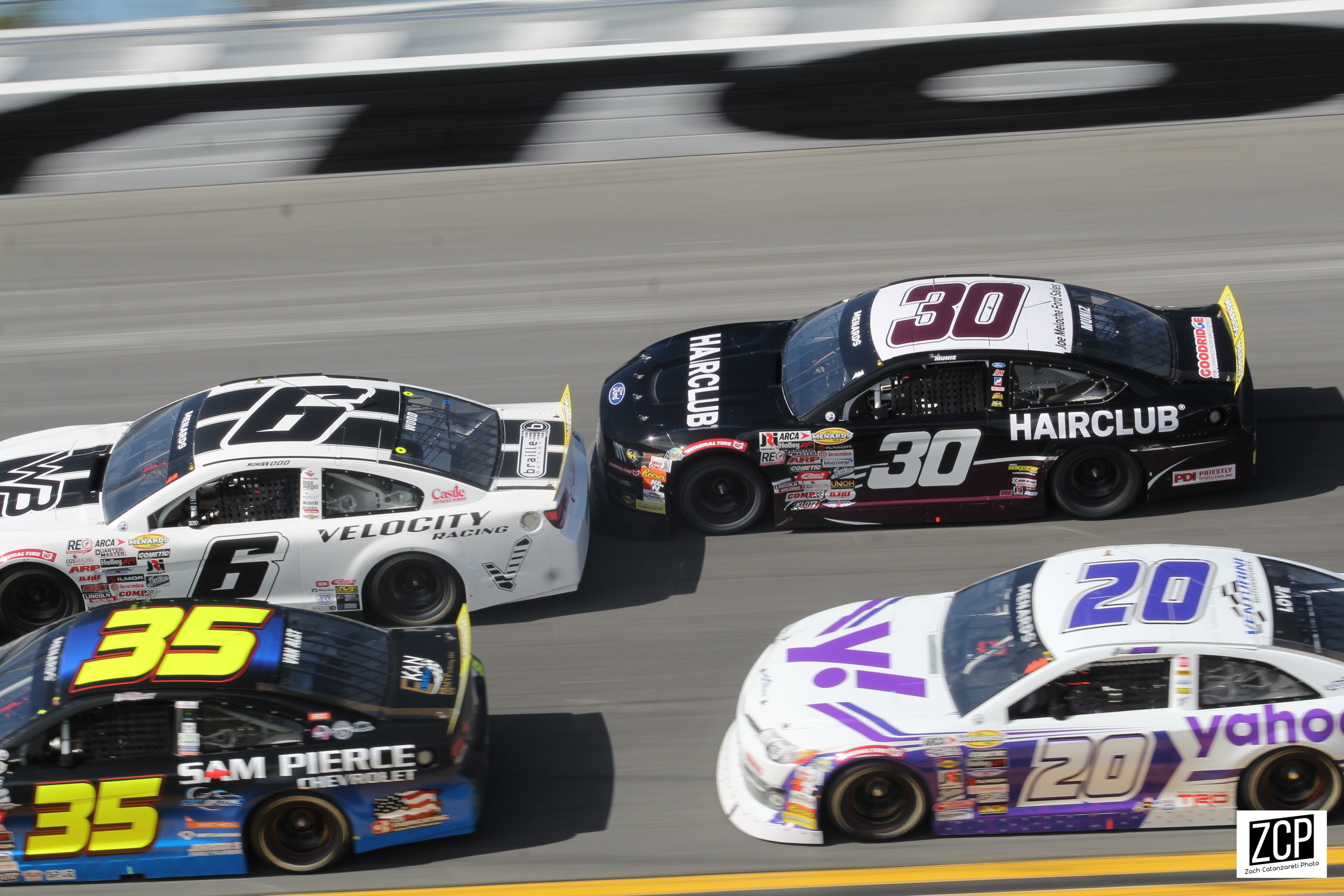
Jesse Love driving the #20 Yahoo Toyota in the 2023 BRANDT 200

Jesse Love ran the No. 20 in 14 races in 2022, excluding 6 events which Corey Heim ran. Love returned to pilot the No. 20 full time in 2023, as he had turned 18 before the season began. Love finished 7th in the season opener at Daytona. He had led 38 laps in the second race at Phoenix before he crashed and ended up 27th. Love bounced back winning the next three races at Talladega, Kansas and Charlotte. Love would go on to dominate the season, winning 10 races and the championship.

Multiple Drivers (2024)

The No. 20 was shared by multiple drivers for 2024.

Multiple Drivers (2025)

On January 5, 2025, it was announced that Lawless Alan would drive the No. 20 full-time in 2025, but that would be down to part-time, as Leland Honeyman would drive the No. 20 for the final few races.

=== Car No. 22 History ===
Amber Balcaen (2024)

On January 9, 2024, Balcaen was announced to be joining VMS full-time, piloting the No. 22. Balcaen would finish sixth in the points standings with seven Top 10s.

=== Car No. 25 history ===
Multiple Drivers (2008)

Sixteen races were run by five different drivers in 2008.

Mikey Kile (2010)

Mikey Kile moved from running a limited basis in Brad Keselowski Racing in 2009 to drive the No. 25 in 2010 full-time winning a race at Michigan and finishing fifth in points.

Multiple Drivers (2011)

Ten drivers drove in the No. 25 in 2011.

Brennan Poole (2012)

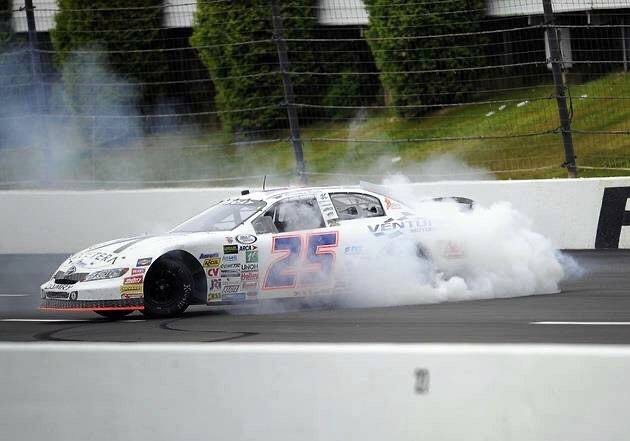
Brennan Poole at Pocono Raceway in 2012

Poole would drive the No. 25 in 2012 full-time earning fifteen top tens, three poles, and two wins back-to-back at Elko Speedway and Pocono Raceway to finish third in points before being forced to race part-time for the next two years due to a lack of funding, he would serve as a crew chief, spotter, consultant, and engineer for the team in that time.

Justin Boston (2013-2014)

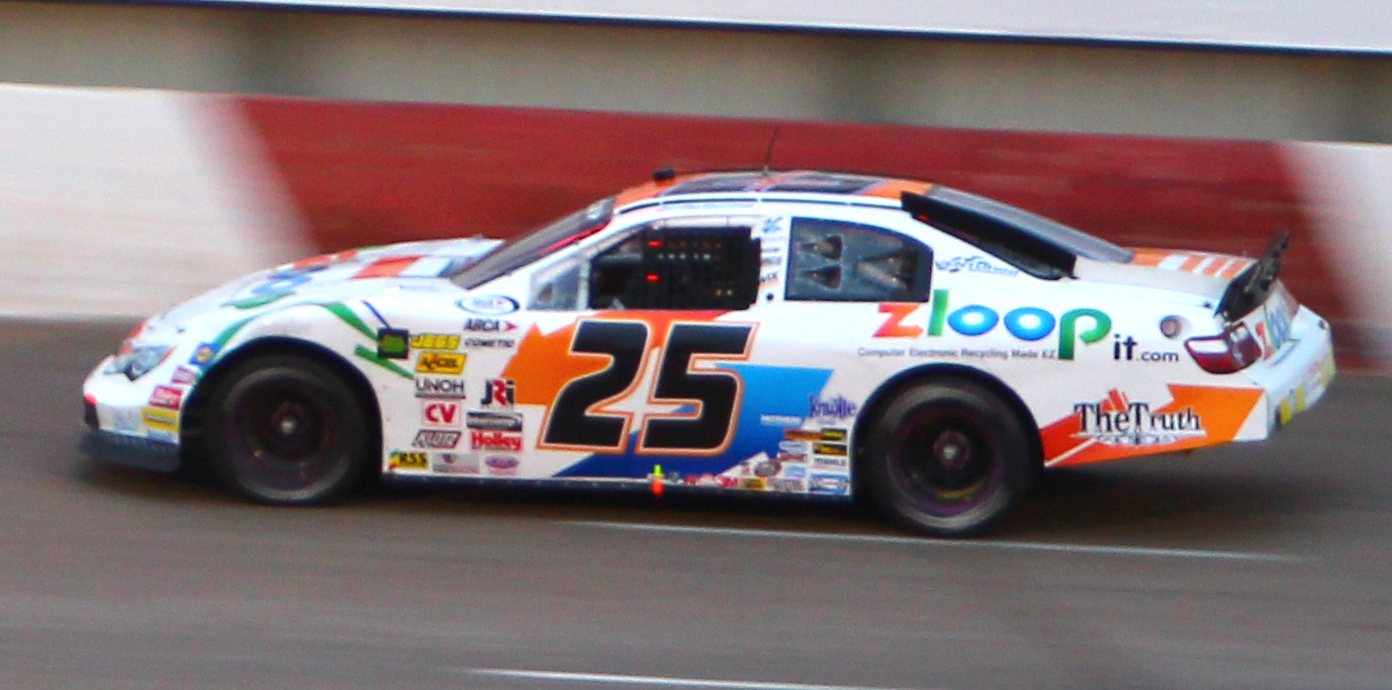
Justin Boston in the No. 25 at Elko Speedway in 2013

To replace Poole, Venturini got Justin Boston to race the No. 25 in 2013, with his sponsor, Zloop. His highest finish was second at Madison Speedway. That was one of his eight top-fives that season. He ended up getting the Rookie Of The Year honors and finished third in the standings behind Mason Mingus and Frank Kimmel. He drove the No. 25 again in 2014. Although he got two wins at Toledo and Madison, he finished fifth in points for 2014. He left the No. 25 in 2015 to drive two more races in ARCA in Venturini's No. 55.

Frank Kimmel And Brandon Jones (2015)

Both drivers drove ten races in 2015, with Kimmel finishing thirteenth in points to Jones finishing fifteenth. Kimmel's highest finish was second at Michigan and Jones’ highest finish was also second but at Mobile.

Tom Hessert (2016)

After Jones and Kimmel left, Tom Hessert was picked up to drive the No. 25 for 2016. He won one race at DeQuoin and ended up finishing second in points to Hessert's replacement at Cunningham Motorsports, Chase Briscoe.

Multiple Drivers (2017)

Hessert drove part-time along with a couple of other drivers including Natalie Decker.

Natalie Decker (2018)

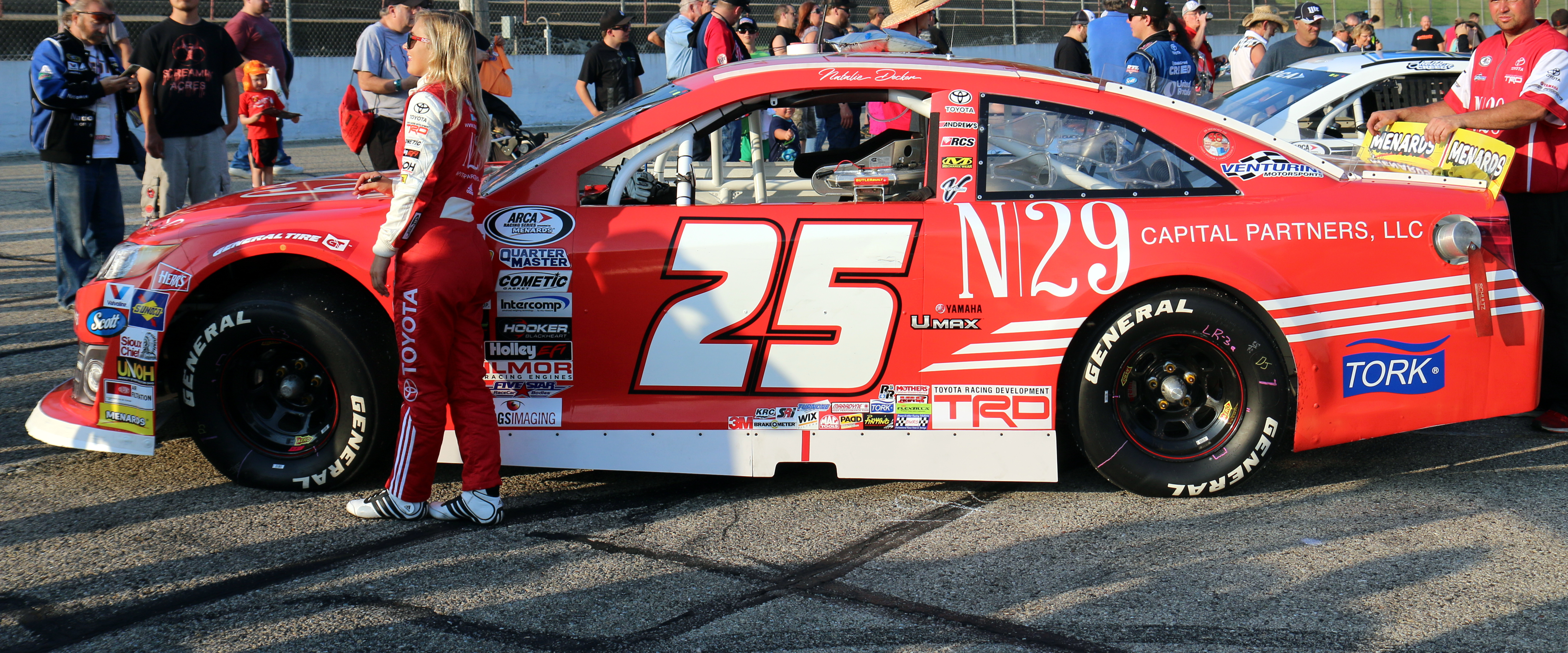
Natalie Decker drove the No. 25 car in 2018

Decker was assigned to drive full-time in 2018. She got two top fives at the season opener and Elko. She was then promoted to the Truck Series after finishing seventh in points for Venturini in the 2018 season.

Michael Self (2019-2020)

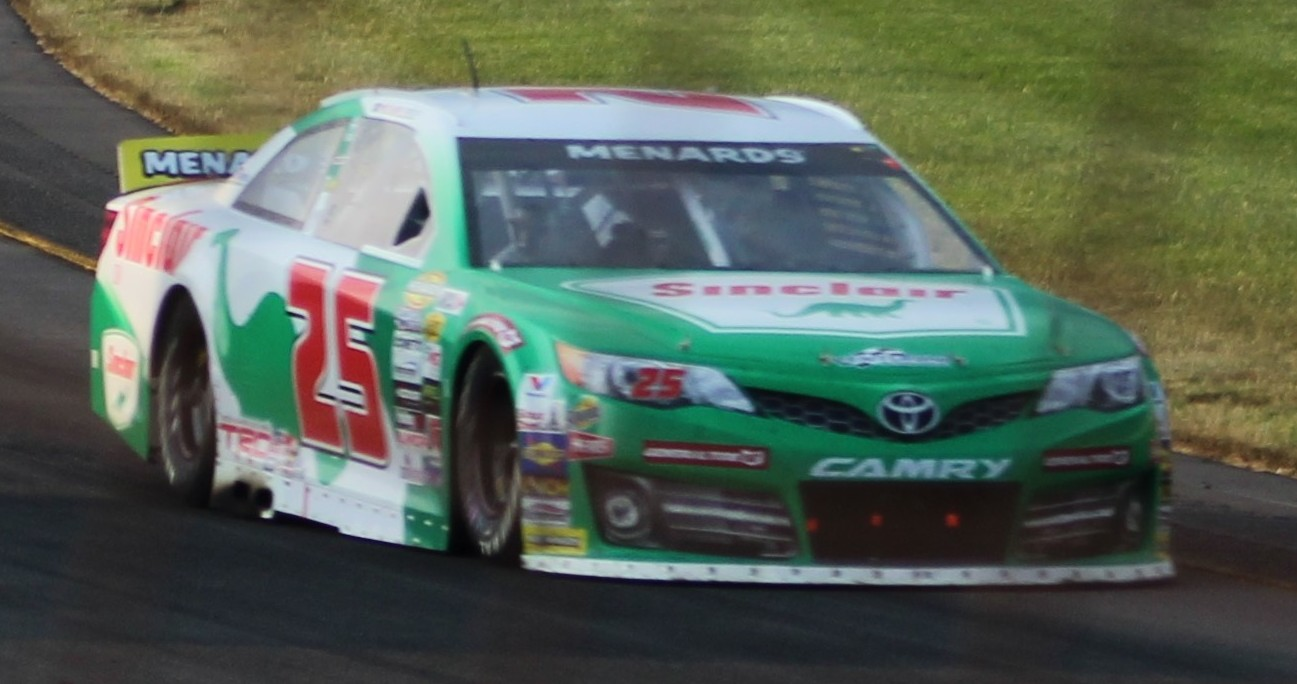
Michael Self in the No. 25 at Pocono Raceway in 2019

Michael Self replaced Decker after he got some wins driving part-time. After wrecking in the season opener, he retaliated by winning the next two races. He won two more races and finished second behind his teammate in points, Christian Eckes. In 2020, he won the season opener and finished second in the next race before the 2019-20 coronavirus pandemic held up the rest of the season. Following the resumption of the season, Self won at Daytona again to sweep the races. Self would go on to finish second in points again, only 12 points behind champion Bret Holmes.

Multiple Drivers (2021)

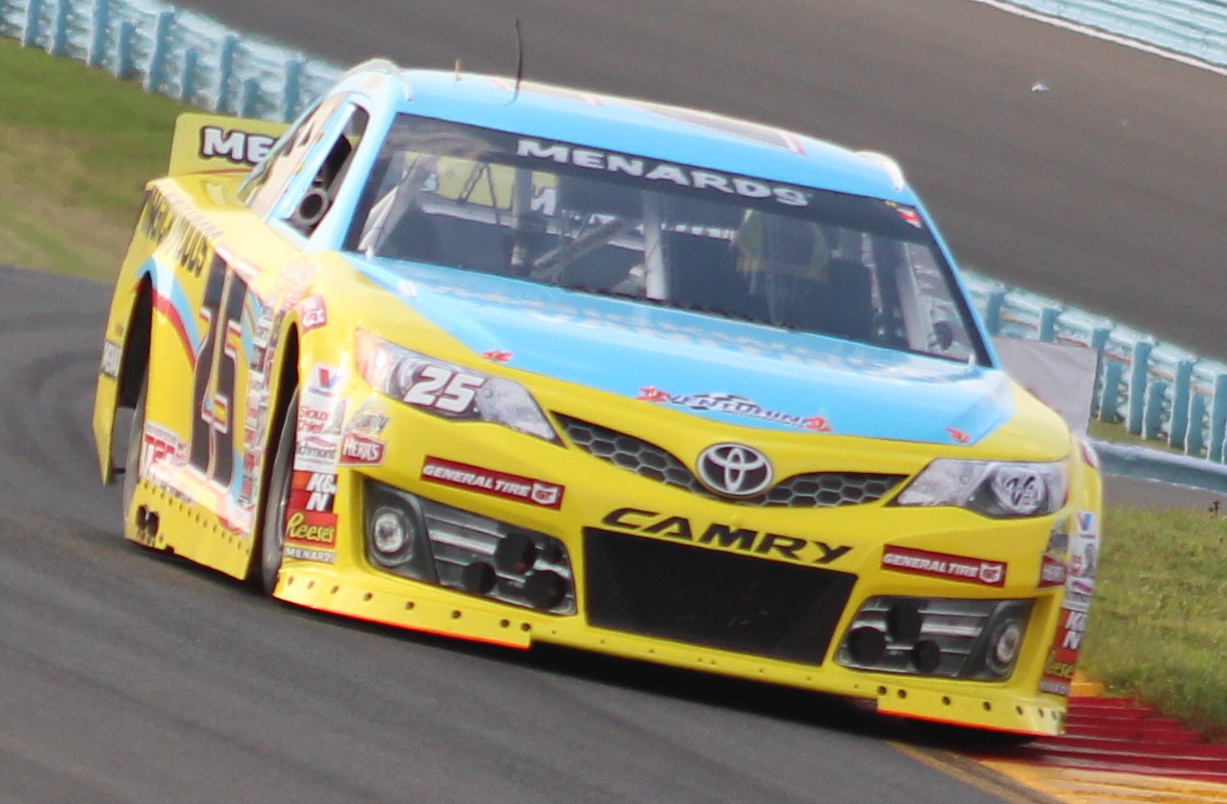
Brandon Jones in the No. 25 at Watkins Glen

Gracie Trotter was promoted from the Arca West Series to the ARCA Menards Series on a part-time schedule for 4 races beginning at the Lucas Oil 200. Trotter would compete in eight races with seven other drivers filling out the rest of the schedule

Toni Breidinger (2022)

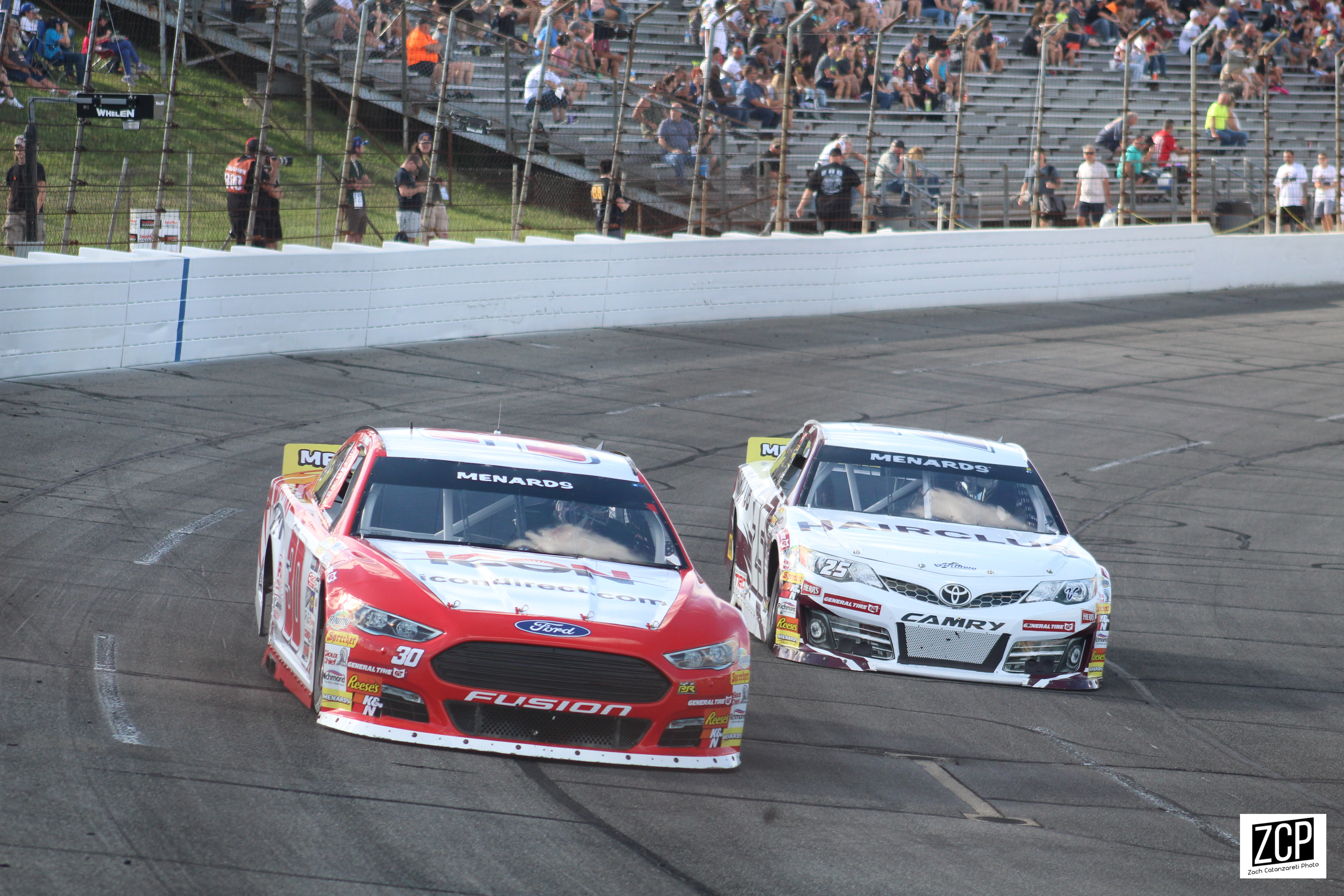
Toni Breidinger in the #25 Hairclub Toyota

In 2022, Toni Breidinger would run this car full-time. She scored 6 top tens which came at Daytona, Kansas, Berlin, Pocono, Kansas 2, and Salem. Her average finish for the season was 12.8. She finished the season 6th in the points standings.

Multiple Drivers (2023)

The No. 25 was shared by multiple drivers again for 2023. Brent Crews, in one of his select races, won at the Illinois State Fairgrounds Racetrack.

Toni Breidinger (2024)

For 2024, Toni Breidinger returned to full-time status in the No. 25. Breidinger enjoyed a solid season, accumulating eleven Top 10s and finishing 4th in the points standings.

Multiple Drivers (2025)

The No. 25 was shared by multiple drivers again for 2025.

=== Car No. 28 history ===
Miguel Paludo (2011)

The No. 28 only ran one race, with Miguel Paludo at the season opener, finishing thirteenth.

=== Car No. 35 history ===
Multiple Drivers (2010, 2012)

The No. 35 was first run in 2010 with it only being driven in six races. After not racing in 2011, the No. 35 was revived in 2012 for a full-time season with part-time drivers.

Milka Duno (2013)

Venturini hired Milka Duno for her first and only full-time season in 2013. She even got a pole at the Talladega race, leading the first eleven laps before wrecking out. Her highest finish was eighth at Salem. After finishing almost all her races in the top twenty, she finished seventh in points. This was the last year the No. 35 raced.

=== Car No. 47 history ===
Tom Berte (2008)

The No. 47 only ran two races in 2008. Tom Berte drove both of them. The No. 47 has not run since.

=== Car No. 48 history ===
Tom Berte (2008)

The No. 48 only ran one race, with Tom Berte in 2008.

=== Car No. 55 history ===
Multiple Drivers (2010-2017)

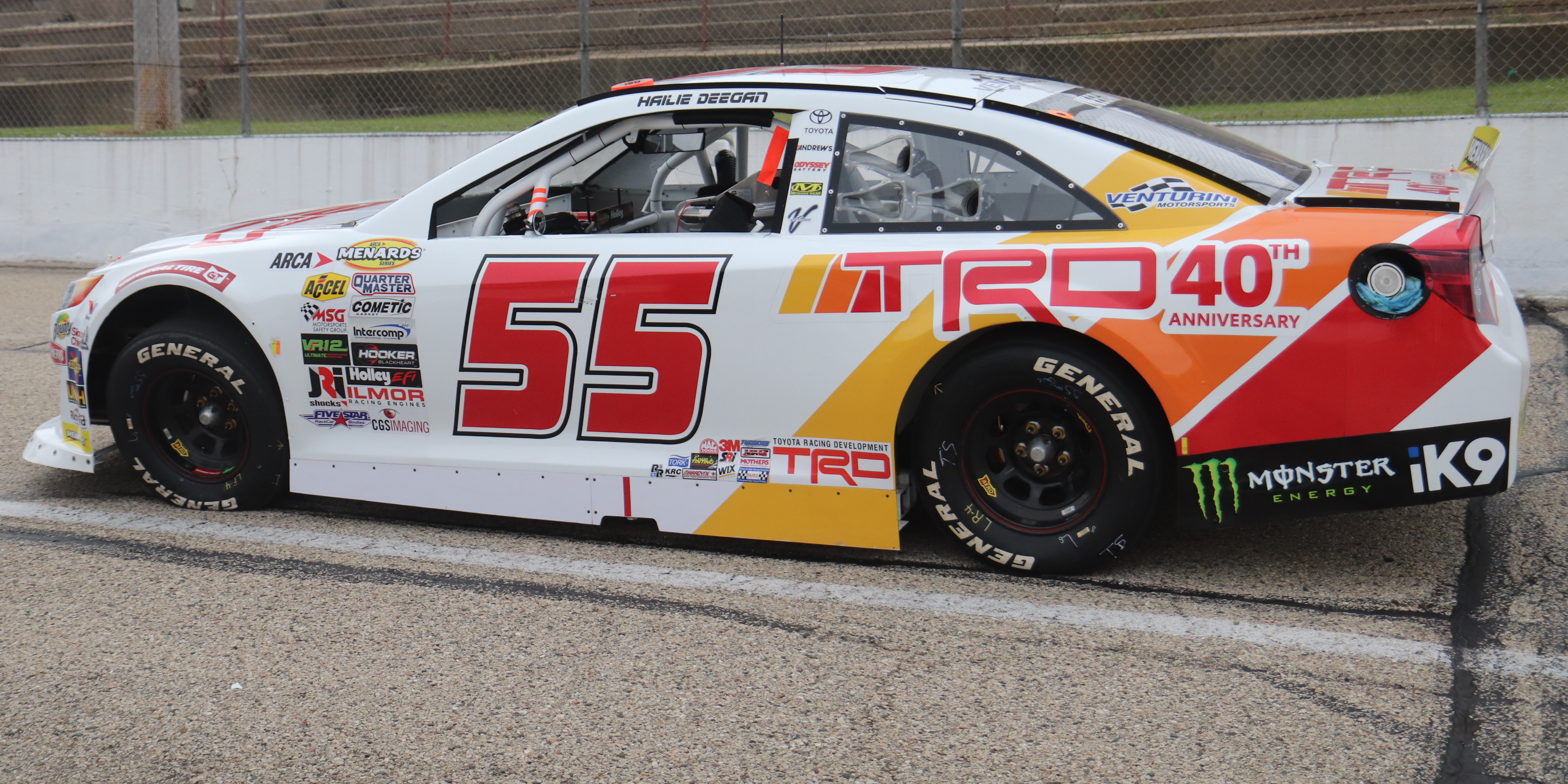
Hailie Deegan's No. 55 car at Madison International Speedway in 2019

In 2010, Steve Arpin eighteen races while two others filled the others. In 2011, ten drivers shared the car, including current Cup Series drivers, Alex Bowman, and Brennan Poole. In 2012, Erik Jones drove most of the races before finishing twenty-first in points. In 2013, Taylor Ferns drove the most out of the ten drivers sharing the No. 55. Cody Coughlin would drive the most races in 2014. Coughlin again would share the No. 55 in 2015 with at the time, future Cup Series drivers such as William Byron and Daniel Suárez. In 2016, Dalton Sargeant drove the most races with fifteen in the No. 55. Zane Smith would drive the most races for the No. 55 team in 2017.

Corey Heim (2020)

In 2020, Venturini announced Corey Heim will drive their No. 55 part-time in 2020.

Derek Griffith (2021)

Derek will drive the 55 for two races in 2021. One of these races was the Lucas Oil 200.

Gus Dean (2022)

Dean drive the 55 for at least five races in 2022. One of these races was the Lucas Oil 200.

==== Isabella Robusto (2024-2025) ====
Robusto started the 2024 season with a 6th place finish in Phoenix. Robusto won the pole at Kansas 2, being the 6th female driver to do so.

On December 20, 2024, it was announced that Robusto would drive the No. 55 full-time in 2025.

=== Car No. 66 history ===
Mark Thompson (2010-2012)

Thompson would drive the No. 66 in only two races in 2010, the season opener where he finished second, and at Talladega where he finished 25th. In 2011, he raced in two races again, at the opener, finishing seventeenth, and at Chicago, finishing thirty-fourth. 2012 was the only season the No. 66 was raced full-time. In 2012, he finished fifth in the season opener, fourteenth at Talladega, and twenty-fourth at Chicago. The No. 66 did not run in 2013.

Multiple Drivers (2014)

Ten drivers shared the No. 66 in 2014.

Leilani Münter (2015)

Leilani drove the No. 66 in one race, wrecking out at the season opener, finishing 38th.

Multiple Drivers (2016)

Five races were run in 2015, with Mark Thompson running two while the other three drove one.

=== Wins ===
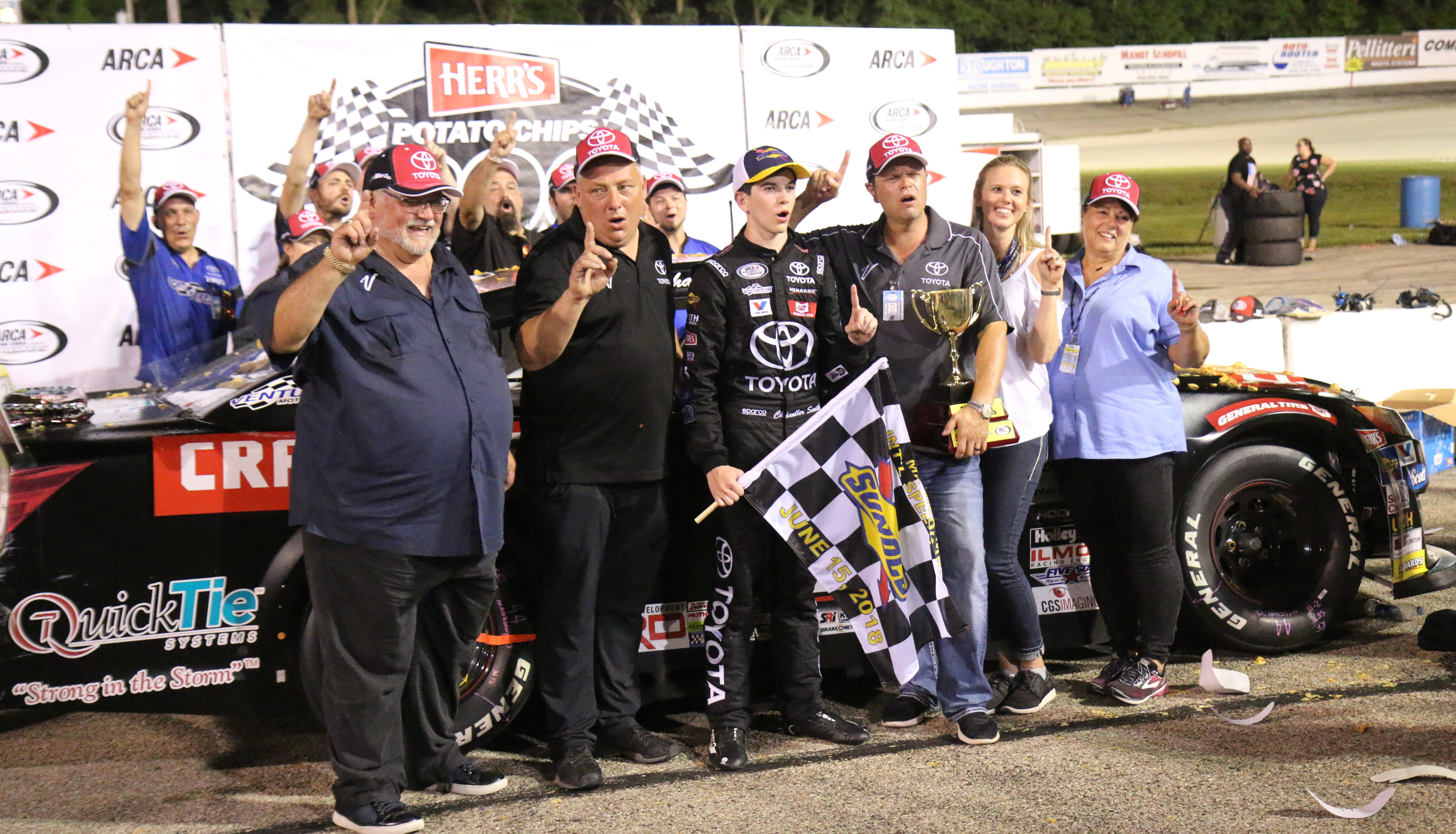
2018 ARCA Venturini Motorsports team in victory lane at Madison

In 2006, the team ended a 12-year winless streak when Billy Venturini won the Kentuckiana Ford Dealers ARCA 200 by Federated Auto Parts. Since 2006, Venturini Motorsports drivers had won 86 ARCA Menards Series races:
