= Chase Pinsonneault =

Canadian racing driver

- Born: November 7, 2006 (age 20) Belle River, Ontario, Canada

CARS Pro Late Model Tour career
- Debut season: 2024
- Years active: 2024
- Starts: 1
- Championships: 0
- Wins: 0
- Poles: 0
- Best finish: N/A in 2024
- Statistics up to date as of September 24, 2025.

Chase Pinsonneault (born November 7, 2006) is a Canadian professional stock car racing driver who last competed part-time in the ARCA Menards Series, driving the No. 15 Toyota for Venturini Motorsports.

== Racing career ==
Pinsonneault has previously competed in series such as the CRA JEGS All-Stars Tour, where he won one race and finished second in the points in 2024, the ASA STARS National Tour, the ASA CRA Super Series, and the APC United Late Model Series.

On December 30, 2024, it was announced that Pinsonneault would attempt to make his debut in the ARCA Menards Series at the season opening race at Daytona International Speedway in 2025, driving the No. 15 Toyota for Venturini Motorsports, although he failed to qualify after qualifying was cancelled due to rain.

== Motorsports career results ==
=== Stock car career summary ===
Season	Series	Team	Races	Wins	Top 5	Top 10	Points	Position
2024	ASA STARS National Tour	Zach Dunson Motorsports	3	0	1	3	177	19th
2024	CARS Pro Late Model Tour	Zach Dunson Motorsports	1	0	0	0	0	N/A
2025	ASA STARS National Tour	Zach Dunson Motorsports	12	0	0	3	509	11th
2025	ARCA Menards Series	Venturini Motorsports	0	0	0	0	0	N/A
2026	ASA STARS National Tour	Zach Dunson Motorsports	11	0	1	5		

=== ARCA Menards Series ===
(key) (Bold – Pole position awarded by qualifying time. Italics – Pole position earned by points standings or practice time. * – Most laps led. ** – All laps led.)

ARCA Menards Series results
Year	Team	No.	Make	1	2	3	4	5	6	7	8	9	10	11	12	13	14	15	16	17	18	19	20	AMSC	Pts	Ref
2025	Venturini Motorsports	15	Toyota	DAY; DNQ	PHO	TAL	KAN	CLT	MCH	BER	ELK	LRP	DOV	IRP	IOW	GLN	ISF	MAD	DSF	BRI	SLM	KAN	TOL	N/A	0	

=== CARS Pro Late Model Tour ===
(key)

CARS Pro Late Model Tour results
Year	Team	No.	Make	1	2	3	4	5	6	7	8	9	10	11	12	13	CPLMTC	Pts	Ref
2024	Zach Dunson Motorsports	14	N/A	SNM; 13	HCY	OCS	ACE	TCM	CRW	HCY	NWS	ACE	FLC	SBO	TCM	NWS	N/A	0	

=== ASA STARS National Tour ===
(key) (Bold – Pole position awarded by qualifying time. Italics – Pole position earned by points standings or practice time. * – Most laps led. ** – All laps led.)

ASA STARS National Tour results
Year	Team	No.	Make	1	2	3	4	5	6	7	8	9	10	11	12	ASNTC	Pts	Ref
2024	Zach Dunson Motorsports	14	Chevy	NSM	FIF	HCY	MAD	MLW	AND	OWO; 8	TOL; 8	WIN; 4	NSV			19th	177	
2025	Zach Dunson Motorsports	14P	Chevy	NSM; 20	FIF; 17	DOM; 12	HCY; 12	NPS; 8	MAD; 15	SLG; 6	AND; 6	OWO; 14	TOL; 18		NSV; 11	11th	509	
2025	Zach Dunson Motorsports	14	Chevy											WIN; 16		11th	509	
2026	Zach Dunson Motorsports	14	Chevy	NSM; 20	FIF; 8	HCY; 4	SLG; 9	MAD; 17	NPS; 12	OWO; 11	TRI; 12	WIN; 6	NSV; 16	NSM; 9		-*	-*	
