= Alfred Pinsonneault =

Canadian politician

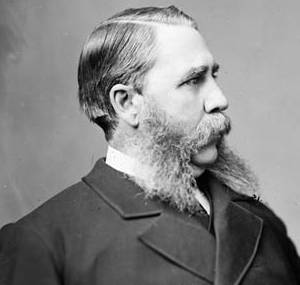

Member of the Canadian Parliament for Laprairie
- In office 1867–1887
- Succeeded by: Cyrille Doyon

Personal details
- Born: 1830 St-Jacques le Mineur, Lower Canada
- Died: August 20, 1897 (aged 66–67) Saint-Jean-sur-Richelieu, Quebec
- Party: Conservative

Alfred Pinsonneault (ca. 1830 – August 20, 1897) was a Quebec farmer and political figure. He represented Laprairie in the House of Commons of Canada as a Conservative member from 1867 to 1887.

He was born in Saint-Jacques-le-Mineur, Quebec around 1830. He served as a lieutenant-colonel in the local militia and was also justice of the peace. He was elected to the Legislative Assembly of the Province of Canada in a by-election in 1863 after the sitting member was appointed a judge; he was reelected in the general election later that same year and again after Confederation. He retired from politics in 1887. In 1888, he was named harbour master for the port of Saint-Jean-sur-Richelieu.

1878 Canadian federal election: La Prairie
Party	Candidate	Votes
Conservative	Alfred Pinsonneault	661
Unknown	T.A. Longtin	601

1874 Canadian federal election: La Prairie
Party	Candidate	Votes
Conservative	Alfred Pinsonneault	Acclaimed
Source: Canadian Elections Database

1872 Canadian federal election: La Prairie
Party	Candidate	Votes
Conservative	Alfred Pinsonneault	632
Unknown	Louis-Onésime Loranger	563
Source: Canadian Elections Database

1867 Canadian federal election: La Prairie
Party	Candidate	Votes
Conservative	Alfred Pinsonneault	750
Unknown	M. Normandeau	293
Eligible voters		1,688
Source: Canadian Parliamentary Guide, 1871
