= Louis Conrad Pelletier =

Canadian politician

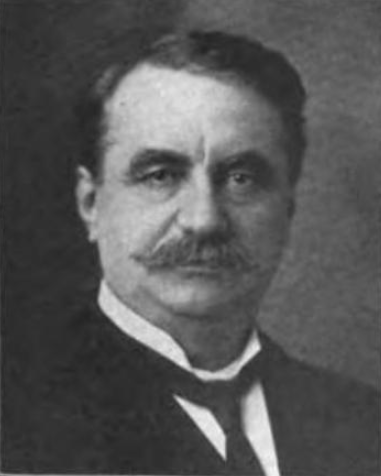

Member of the Canadian Parliament for Laprairie
- In office 1891–1896
- Preceded by: Cyrille Doyon
- Succeeded by: District was abolished in 1892

Personal details
- Born: November 10, 1852 Lavaltrie, Canada East
- Died: June 5, 1929 (aged 76) Montreal, Quebec
- Party: Conservative

Louis Conrad Pelletier, KC (November 10, 1852 – June 5, 1929) was a Quebec lawyer and political figure. He represented Laprairie in the House of Commons of Canada from 1891 to 1896 as a Conservative member.

== Biography ==
He was born in Lavaltrie, Canada East, the son of Emile Pelletier and Emilie Laporte. He was educated at the Collège de l'Assomption and McGill University. Pelletier was admitted to the Quebec bar in 1877 and set up practice in Montreal. He ran unsuccessfully for the La Prairie seat in the Quebec assembly in 1890 and again in 1900. He was elected to the House of Commons in the 1891 federal election and was defeated by Dominique Monet when he ran for reelection in the newly created riding of Laprairie—Napierville in 1896. Pelletier was named Queen's Counsel in 1893.

In 1894, he married Marie-Anne Élisabeth Élisa Bernardette Roberge. Pelletier served as mayor for La Prairie in 1904. He was also co-founder of the St. Lawrence Brick company (Briqueterie Saint-Laurent). Pelletier was bâtonnier for the Montreal bar from 1920 to 1921.

Louis-Siméon Morin, a cousin on his father's side, served as a member of the legislative assembly for the Province of Canada.

Louis Conrad Pelletier died at his home in Montreal on June 5, 1929.
