= Canadian federal election results in Montérégie =

Seats obtained by party (since 1925)

Liberal
Conservative
New Democratic
Bloc Québécois
Social Credit (defunct)
Progressive Conservative (defunct)
Bloc populaire (1945)
Independents

Canadian federal elections have provided the following results in Montérégie.

== Regional profile ==
Montérégie stretches from Montreal's South Shore suburbs into the countryside to the east. The former have been a battleground between the Liberals and the Bloc Québécois because of the collapse of the Progressive Conservative Party in 1993. The more rural ridings of Saint-Jean, Verchères—Les-Patriotes and Chambly—Borduas are Bloquist strongholds. Vaudreuil-Soulanges, west of Montreal, has a significant Anglophone population and can usually be expected to vote Liberal—its 2004 fall to the BQ on election night was one of the biggest surprises on election night. The fallout from the sponsorship scandal allowed the Bloc to sweep the region in 2006 for the first time, although the Liberals regained the traditional Liberal seat of Brossard-La Prairie in 2008, albeit on a judicial recount. Conservative support picked up significantly in the rural areas but remains very low in the suburban areas.

However, these distinctions were overwhelmed by the surge of NDP support in Quebec in the 2011 election, with the party sweeping every seat in this region by wide margins—in no case by less than 3,500 votes, and in several cases by nearly or more than 10,000 votes. In a huge reversal of fortunes, the NDP was cut down to just 3 seats in the region during the 2015 election, in which the Liberals surged to captured most of the region's seats. Renewed Bloc strength allowed them to capture several seats at the NDP and Liberals' expense in 2019.

=== Votes by party throughout time ===
Election	Liberal	Conservative	New Democratic	Bloc Québécois	Green	People's	PC	Reform / Alliance	Social Credit	Others
1979	266,648; 65.5%	—N/a	26,145; 6.4%	—N/a	—N/a	—N/a	53,111; 13.0%	—N/a	46,288; 11.4%	15,078; 3.7%
1980	263,760; 71.2%	—N/a	44,365; 12.0%	—N/a	—N/a	—N/a	38,278; 10.3%	—N/a	8,858; 2.4%	15,188; 4.1%
1984	146,172; 31.5%	—N/a	47,758; 10.3%	—N/a	—N/a	—N/a	242,887; 52.3%	—N/a	—N/a	27,247; 5.9%
1988	127,216; 26.9%	—N/a	76,574; 16.2%	—N/a	2,401; 0.5%	—N/a	253,213; 53.6%	—N/a	—N/a	13,106; 2.8%
1993	170,303; 32.1%	—N/a	8,550; 1.6%	291,875; 54.9%	—N/a	—N/a	54,495; 10.3%	—N/a	—N/a	6,080; 1.1%
1997	173,622; 33.8%	—N/a	8,203; 1.6%	223,092; 43.5%	—N/a	—N/a	106,618; 20.8%	573; 0.1%	—N/a	1,141; 0.2%
2000	203,719; 41.1%	—N/a	7,306; 1.5%	218,637; 44.1%	—N/a	—N/a	26,635; 5.4%	29,319; 5.9%	—N/a	10,157; 2.0%
2004	159,300; 31.2%	34,538; 6.8%	20,296; 4.0%	278,693; 54.6%	15,284; 3.0%	—N/a	—N/a	—N/a	—N/a	2,779; 0.5%
2006	100,172; 18.4%	112,042; 20.5%	39,915; 7.3%	269,728; 49.5%	22,281; 4.1%	—N/a	—N/a	—N/a	—N/a	1,090; 0.2%
2008	115,164; 20.9%	96,032; 17.4%	71,595; 13.0%	247,180; 44.9%	19,608; 3.6%	—N/a	—N/a	—N/a	—N/a	780; 0.1%
2011	71,995; 12.6%	62,505; 10.9%	258,076; 45.2%	158,491; 27.7%	11,846; 2.1%	—N/a	—N/a	—N/a	—N/a	8,343; 1.5%
2015	229,488; 35.4%	70,192; 10.8%	170,173; 26.3%	157,783; 24.4%	17,790; 2.7%	—N/a	—N/a	—N/a	—N/a	2,288; 0.4%
2019	238,039; 35.8%	58,978; 8.9%	61,000; 9.2%	263,940; 39.7%	34,858; 5.2%	5,780; 0.9%	—N/a	—N/a	—N/a	1,821; 0.3%
2021	221,114; 35.2%	67,209; 10.7%	53,232; 8.5%	256,136; 40.8%	8,256; 1.3%	13,227; 2.1%	—N/a	—N/a	—N/a	8,891; 1.4%
2025	307,807; 44.0%	118,782; 17.0%	21,539; 3.1%	240,861; 34.4%	5,961; 0.9%	4,895; 0.7%	—N/a	—N/a	—N/a	389; 0.1%

Liberal Conservative New Democratic Bloc Québécois	Green Progressive Conservative (defunct) Alliance / Reform (defunct) Social Credit (defunct)

== Detailed results ==
=== 2021 ===
Electoral district	Candidates								Incumbent
Electoral district	Liberal	Conservative	BQ	NDP	Green	PPC	FPC	Other	Incumbent
Beloeil—Chambly	Marie-Chantal Hamel; 15,502; 23.73%	Stéphane Robichaud; 5,661; 8.67%	Yves-François Blanchet; 34,678; 53.09%	Marie-Josée Béliveau; 5,524; 8.46%	Fabrice Gélinas Larrain; 1,294; 1.98%	Danila Ejov; 1,316; 2.01%	Mario Grimard; 810; 1.24%	Michel Blondin (PIQ); 163 0.25%	Yves-Francois Blanchet
Beloeil—Chambly	Marie-Chantal Hamel; 15,502; 23.73%	Stéphane Robichaud; 5,661; 8.67%	Yves-François Blanchet; 34,678; 53.09%	Marie-Josée Béliveau; 5,524; 8.46%	Fabrice Gélinas Larrain; 1,294; 1.98%	Danila Ejov; 1,316; 2.01%	Mario Grimard; 810; 1.24%	Thomas Thibault-Vincent (Rhino.); 185 0.28%	Yves-Francois Blanchet
Beloeil—Chambly	Marie-Chantal Hamel; 15,502; 23.73%	Stéphane Robichaud; 5,661; 8.67%	Yves-François Blanchet; 34,678; 53.09%	Marie-Josée Béliveau; 5,524; 8.46%	Fabrice Gélinas Larrain; 1,294; 1.98%	Danila Ejov; 1,316; 2.01%	Mario Grimard; 810; 1.24%	Benjamin Vachon (Mar.); 191 0.29%	Yves-Francois Blanchet
Brossard—Saint-Lambert	Alexandra Mendès; 28,326; 54.10%	Marcos Alves; 6,276; 11.99%	Marie-Laurence Desgagné; 10,441; 19.94%	Marc Audet; 5,442; 10.39%		Brenda Ross; 1,288; 2.46%	Engineer-Ingénieur Hu; 583; 1.11%		Alexandra Mendès
Châteauguay—Lacolle (judicial recount result)	Brenda Shanahan; 18,029; 37.03%	Pierre Bournaki; 5,538; 11.38%	Patrick O'Hara; 18,017; 37.01%	Hannah Wolker; 3,752; 7.71%	Frédéric Olivier; 801; 1.65%	Jeff Benoit; 1,821; 3.74%	André Lafrance; 448; 0.92%	Marc Gagnon (PIQ); 277; 0.57%	Brenda Shanahan
La Prairie	Caroline Desrochers; 20,470; 34.61%	Lise des Greniers; 5,878; 9.94%	Alain Therrien; 25,862; 43.73%	Victoria Hernandez; 4,317; 7.30%	Barbara Joannette; 983; 1.66%	Ruth Fontaine; 1,532; 2.59%		Normand Chouinard (M-L); 98; 0.17%	Alain Therrien
Longueuil—Charles-LeMoyne	Sherry Romanado; 19,400; 40.44%	Isabelle Lalonde; 3,986; 8.31%	Nathalie Boisclair; 16,926; 35.28%	Kalden Dhatsenpa; 4,957; 10.33%	Nancy Cardin; 1,170; 2.44%	Tiny Olinga; 1,409; 2.94%		Pierre Chénier (M-L); 122; 0.25%	Sherry Romanado
Longueuil—Saint-Hubert	Florence Gagnon; 21,930; 38.32%	Boukare Tall; 3,964; 6.93%	Denis Trudel; 23,579; 41.20%	Mildred Murray; 4,553; 7.95%	Simon King; 1,599; 2.79%	Manon Girard; 1,358; 2.37%		Jacinthe Lafrenaye (PIQ); 252; 0.44%	Denis Trudel
Montarville	Marie-Ève Pelchat; 19,974; 34.75%	Julie Sauvageau; 5,460; 9.50%	Stéphane Bergeron; 26,011; 45.26%	Djaouida Sellah; 4,809; 8.37%		Natasha Hynes; 1,218; 2.12%			Stéphane Bergeron
Pierre-Boucher—Les Patriotes—Verchères	Louis-Gabriel Girard; 14,282; 25.85%	Jérôme Painchaud; 4,870; 8.82%	Xavier Barsalou-Duval; 29,978; 54.26%	Martin Leprohon; 4,261; 7.71%		Alexandre Blais; 1,078; 1.95%	Carole Boisvert; 777; 1.41%		Xavier Barsalou-Duval
Saint-Jean	Jean Rioux; 16,650; 28.12%	Serge Benoit; 7,544; 12.74%	Christine Normandin; 27,243; 46.01%	Jeremy Fournier; 4,308; 7.28%	Leigh V. Ryan; 1,262; 2.13%		Jean-Charles Cléroux; 1,790; 3.02%	Pierre Duteau (PIQ); 413; 0.70%	Christine Normandin
Salaberry—Suroît	Linda Gallant; 16,550; 27.19%	Jean Collette; 7,476; 12.28%	Claude Debellefeuille; 29,093; 47.80%	Joan Gottman; 4,529; 7.44%		Nicolas Thivierge; 2,207; 3.63%	Marcel Goyette; 561; 0.92%	Luc Bertrand (PIQ); 449; 0.74%	Claude DeBellefeuille
Vaudreuil—Soulanges	Peter Schiefke; 30,001; 46.47%	Karen Cox; 10,556; 16.35%	Thierry Vadnais-Lapierre; 14,308; 22.16%	Niklas Brake; 6,780; 10.50%	Cameron Stiff; 1,631; 2.53%		Ginette Destrempes; 1,288; 1.99%		Peter Schiefke

=== 2019 ===
Electoral district	Candidates							Incumbent
Electoral district	Liberal	Conservative	BQ	NDP	Green	PPC	Other	Incumbent
Beloeil—Chambly	Marie-Chantal Hamel; 16,059; 23.11%	Véronique Laprise; 4,305; 6.20%	Yves-François Blanchet; 35,068; 50.46%	Matthew Dubé; 10,086; 14.51%	Pierre Carrier; 3,255; 4.68%	Chloé Bernard; 512; 0.74%	Michel Blondin (PIQ); 205; 0.30%	Matthew Dubé
Brossard—Saint-Lambert	Alexandra Mendès; 30,537; 53.90%	Glenn Hoa; 6,112; 10.79%	Marie-Claude Diotte; 11,131; 19.65%	Marc Audet; 5,410; 9.55%	Grégory De Luca; 2,935; 5.18%	Sam Nassif; 527; 0.93%		Alexandra Mendès
Châteauguay—Lacolle	Brenda Shanahan; 20,118; 38.39%	Hugues Laplante; 5,851; 11.17%	Claudia Valdivia; 19,479; 37.17%	Marika Lalime; 4,005; 7.64%	Meryam Haddad; 1,929; 3.68%	Jeff Benoit; 563; 1.07%	Pierre Chénier (M-L); 64; 0.12% Marc Gagnon (PIQ); 393; 0.75%	Brenda Shanahan
La Prairie	Jean-Claude Poissant; 22,504; 36.56%	Isabelle Lapointe; 5,540; 9.00%	Alain Therrien; 25,707; 41.76%	Victoria Hernandez; 4,744; 7.71%	Barbara Joannette; 2,565; 4.17%	Gregory Yablunovsky; 393; 0.64%	Normand Chouinard (M-L); 100; 0.16%	Jean-Claude Poissant
Longueuil—Charles-LeMoyne	Sherry Romanado; 20,114; 39.02%	Stéphane Robichaud; 3,811; 7.39%	Cathy Lepage; 18,794; 36.46%	Kalden Dhatsenpa; 5,289; 10.26%	Casandra Poitras; 2,978; 5.78%	Henri Cousineau; 558; 1.08%		Sherry Romanado
Longueuil—Saint-Hubert	Réjean Hébert; 20,471; 34.21%	Patrick Clune; 3,779; 6.31%	Denis Trudel; 23,061; 38.54%	Éric Ferland; 5,104; 8.53%	Pierre Nantel; 6,745; 11.27%	Ellen Comeau; 467; 0.78%	Pierre-Luc Filion (Ind.); 217; 0.36%	Pierre Nantel
Montarville	Michel Picard; 21,061; 35.56%	Julie Sauvageau; 4,138; 6.99%	Stéphane Bergeron; 25,366; 42.83%	Djaouida Sellah; 4,984; 8.41%	Jean-Charles Pelland; 2,967; 5.01%	Julie Lavallée; 501; 0.85%	Thomas Thibault-Vincent (Rhino.); 211; 0.35%	Michel Picard
Pierre-Boucher—Les Patriotes—Verchères	Simon Chalifoux; 17,333; 28.52%	Mathieu Daviault; 4,910; 8.08%	Xavier Barsalou-Duval; 31,009; 51.02%	Sean English; 4,192; 6.90%	Dany Gariépy; 2,955; 4.86%	Clifford Albert; 384; 0.63%		Xavier Barsalou-Duval
Saint-Jean	Jean Rioux; 18,906; 30.56%	Martin Thibert; 6,612; 10.69%	Christine Normandin; 27,750; 44.85%	Chantal Reeves; 4,794; 7.75%	André-Philippe Chenail; 3,127; 5.05%	Marc Hivon; 397; 0.64%	Yvon Savary (PIQ); 289; 0.47%	Jean Rioux
Salaberry—Suroît	Marc Faubert; 18,682; 29.70%	Cynthia Larivière; 6,116; 9.72%	Claude DeBellefeuille; 29,975; 47.65%	Joan Gottman; 5,024; 7.99%	Nahed AlShawa; 1,997; 3.17%	Alain Savard; 767; 1.22%	Luc Bertrand (PIQ); 342; 0.54%	Anne Minh-Thu Quach†
Vaudreuil—Soulanges	Peter Schiefke; 32,254; 47.33%	Karen Cox; 7,804; 11.45%	Noémie Rouillard; 16,600; 24.36%	Amanda MacDonald; 7,368; 10.81%	Cameron Stiff; 3,405; 5.00%	Kaylin Tam; 711; 1.04%		Peter Schiefke

=== 2015 ===
Electoral district	Candidates						Incumbent
Electoral district	Conservative	NDP	Liberal	BQ	Green	Other	Incumbent
Beloeil—Chambly	Claude Chalhoub; 6,173; 9.29%	Matthew Dubé; 20,641; 31.07%	Karine Desjardins; 19,494; 29.34%	Yves Lessard; 18,387; 27.68%	Fodé Kerfalla Yansané; 1,498; 2.25%	Michael Maher (Libert.); 245; 0.37%	Matthew Dubé; Chambly—Borduas
Brossard—Saint-Lambert	Qais Hamidi; 7,215; 12.60%	Hoang Mai; 14,075; 24.58%	Alexandra Mendès; 28,818; 50.33%	Suzanne Lachance; 6,071; 10.60%	Fang Hu; 1,081; 1.89%		Hoang Mai; Brossard—La Prairie
Châteauguay—Lacolle	Philippe St-Pierre; 5,805; 11.21%	Sylvain Chicoine; 11,986; 23.15%	Brenda Shanahan; 20,245; 39.10%	Sophie Stanké; 12,615; 24.36%	Jency Mercier; 982; 1.90%	Linda Sullivan (M-L); 149; 0.29%	Sylvain Chicoine; Châteauguay—Saint-Constant
La Prairie	Yves Perras; 6,859; 11.91%	Pierre Chicoine; 13,174; 22.88%	Jean-Claude Poissant; 20,993; 36.46%	Christian Picard; 15,107; 26.24%	Joanne Tomas; 1,235; 2.15%	Normand Chouinard (M-L); 204; 0.35%	New District
Longueuil—Charles-LeMoyne	Thomas Barré; 4,961; 9.59%	Sadia Groguhé; 12,468; 24.11%	Sherry Romanado; 18,301; 35.39%	Philippe Cloutier; 13,974; 27.03%	Mario Leclerc; 1,510; 2.92%	Pierre Chénier (M-L); 168 0.32%	Sadia Groguhé; Saint-Lambert
Longueuil—Charles-LeMoyne	Thomas Barré; 4,961; 9.59%	Sadia Groguhé; 12,468; 24.11%	Sherry Romanado; 18,301; 35.39%	Philippe Cloutier; 13,974; 27.03%	Mario Leclerc; 1,510; 2.92%	Matthew Iakov Liberman (Rhino.); 325 0.63%	Sadia Groguhé; Saint-Lambert
Longueuil—Saint-Hubert	John Sedlak; 5,087; 8.74%	Pierre Nantel; 18,171; 31.22%	Michael O'Grady; 17,468; 30.01%	Denis Trudel; 15,873; 27.27%	Casandra Poitras; 1,447; 2.49%	Affine Lwalalika (SD); 153; 0.26%	Pierre Nantel; Longueuil—Pierre-Boucher
Montarville	Stéphane Duranleau; 6,284; 10.85%	Djaouida Sellah; 14,296; 24.68%	Michel Picard; 18,848; 32.54%	Catherine Fournier; 16,460; 28.42%	Olivier Adam; 1,388; 2.40%	Claude Leclair (Libert.); 641; 1.11%	Djaouida Sellah; Saint-Bruno—Saint-Hubert
Pierre-Boucher—Les Patriotes— Verchères	Clovis Maheux; 6,079; 10.24%	Raphaël Fortin; 14,454; 24.34%	Lucie Gagnon; 16,794; 28.28%	Xavier Barsalou-Duval; 17,007; 28.64%	JiCi Lauzon; 5,056; 8.51%		Sana Hassainia†; Verchères—Les Patriotes
Saint-Jean	Stéphane Guinta; 6,549; 10.85%	Hans Marotte; 17,555; 29.07%	Jean Rioux; 20,022; 33.16%	Denis Hurtubise; 14,979; 24.81%	Marilyn Redivo; 1,281; 2.12%		Tarik Brahmi†
Salaberry—Suroît	Albert De Martin; 6,132; 9.97%	Anne Minh-Thu Quach; 18,726; 30.43%	Robert Sauvé; 17,955; 29.18%	Claude DeBellefeuille; 17,452; 28.36%	Nicola-Silverado Socrates; 867; 1.41%	Patricia Domingos (SD); 184 0.30%	Anne Minh-Thu Quach; Beauharnois—Salaberry
Salaberry—Suroît	Albert De Martin; 6,132; 9.97%	Anne Minh-Thu Quach; 18,726; 30.43%	Robert Sauvé; 17,955; 29.18%	Claude DeBellefeuille; 17,452; 28.36%	Nicola-Silverado Socrates; 867; 1.41%	Sylvain Larocque (Ind.); 219 0.36%	Anne Minh-Thu Quach; Beauharnois—Salaberry
Vaudreuil—Soulanges	Marc Boudreau; 9,048; 13.81%	Jamie Nicholls; 14,627; 22.32%	Peter Schiefke; 30,550; 46.62%	Vincent François; 9,858; 15.04%	Jennifer Kaszel; 1,445; 2.21%		Jamie Nicholls; Vaudreuil-Soulanges

=== 2011 ===
Electoral district	Candidates						Incumbent
Electoral district	BQ	Conservative	Liberal	NDP	Green	Other	Incumbent
Beauharnois—Salaberry	Claude DeBellefeuille; 18,182; 33.18%	David Couturier; 7,049; 12.87%	François Deslandres; 4,559; 8.32%	Anne Minh-Thu Quach; 23,998; 43.80%	Rémi Pelletier; 1,003; 1.83%		Claude DeBellefeuille
Brossard—La Prairie	Marcel Lussier; 10,890; 17.51%	Maurice Brossard; 7,806; 12.55%	Alexandra Mendès; 16,976; 27.30%	Hoang Mai; 25,512; 41.02%	Kevin Murphy; 900; 1.45%	Normand Chouinard (M-L); 110; 0.18%	Alexandra Mendès
Chambly—Borduas	Yves Lessard; 19,147; 27.65%	Nathalie Ferland Drolet; 5,425; 7.83%	Bernard Delorme; 6,165; 8.90%	Matthew Dubé; 29,591; 42.74%	Nicholas Lescarbeau; 1,072; 1.55%	Jean-François Mercier (Ind.); 7,843; 11.33%	Yves Lessard
Châteauguay— Saint-Constant	Carole Freeman; 14,957; 26.70%	André Turcôt; 5,756; 10.27%	Linda Schwey; 5,069; 9.05%	Sylvain Chicoine; 29,156; 52.04%	Clara Kwan; 923; 1.65%	Linda Sullivan (M-L); 162; 0.29%	Carole Freeman
Longueuil—Pierre-Boucher	Jean Dorion; 14,181; 27.16%	Richard Bélisle; 4,339; 8.31%	Kévan Falsafi; 5,321; 10.19%	Pierre Nantel; 27,119; 51.93%	Valérie St-Amant; 1,032; 1.98%	Serge Patenaude (M-L); 228; 0.44%	Jean Dorion
Saint-Bruno—Saint-Hubert	Carole Lavallée; 15,384; 28.19%	Nicole Charbonneau Barron; 5,887; 10.79%	Michel Picard; 7,423; 13.60%	Djaouida Sellah; 24,361; 44.64%	Germain Denoncourt; 1,523; 2.79%		Carole Lavallée
Saint-Jean	Claude Bachand; 16,023; 30.50%	Jean Thouin; 5,603; 10.66%	Robert David; 4,644; 8.84%	Tarik Brahmi; 24,943; 47.48%	Pierre Tremblay; 1,326; 2.52%		Claude Bachand
Saint-Lambert	Josée Beaudin; 11,353; 25.88%	Qais Hamidi; 4,396; 10.02%	Roxane Stanners; 8,463; 19.30%	Sadia Groguhé; 18,705; 42.65%	Carmen Budilean; 944; 2.15%		Josée Beaudin
Vaudreuil-Soulanges	Meili Faille; 17,781; 25.69%	Marc Boudreau; 11,360; 16.41%	Lyne Pelchat; 8,023; 11.59%	Jamie Nicholls; 30,177; 43.61%	Jean-Yves Massenet; 1,864; 2.69%		Meili Faille
Verchères—Les Patriotes	Luc Malo; 20,593; 36.38%	Rodrigo Alfaro; 4,884; 8.63%	Pier-Luc Therrien-Péloquin; 5,352; 9.46%	Sana Hassainia; 24,514; 43.31%	Thomas Lapierre; 1,259; 2.22%		Luc Malo

=== 2008 ===
Electoral district	Candidates						Incumbent
Electoral district	BQ	Conservative	Liberal	NDP	Green	Other	Incumbent
Beauharnois—Salaberry	Claude Debellefeuille; 26,904; 50.07%	Dominique Bellemare; 10,858; 20.21%	Maria Lopez; 7,995; 14.88%	Anne Minh Thu Quach; 6,214; 11.56%	David Smith; 1,764; 3.28%		Claude DeBellefeuille
Brossard—La Prairie	Marcel Lussier; 19,034; 32.47%	Maurice Brossard; 11,062; 18.87%	Alexandra Mendes; 19,103; 32.59%	Hoang Mai; 7,452; 12.71%	Sonia Ziadé; 1,816; 3.10%	Normand Chouinard (M-L); 157; 0.27%	Marcel Lussier
Chambly—Borduas	Yves Lessard; 31,773; 50.08%	Suzanne Chartrand; 9,564; 15.07%	Gabriel Arsenault; 10,649; 16.78%	Serge Gélinas; 8,998; 14.18%	Olivier Adam; 2,460; 3.88%		Yves Lessard
Châteauguay—Saint-Constant	Carole Freeman; 25,086; 45.58%	Pierre-Paul Routhier; 9,827; 17.86%	Linda Schwey; 10,104; 18.36%	Sonia Jurado; 8,261; 15.01%	Brian Sarwer-Foner; 1,755; 3.19%		Carole Freeman
Longueuil—Pierre-Boucher	Jean Dorion; 23,118; 46.12%	Jacques Bouchard; 7,210; 14.38%	Ryan Hillier; 10,920; 21.79%	Lise St-Denis; 7,021; 14.01%	Danielle Moreau; 1,752; 3.50%	Serge Patenaude (M-L); 103; 0.21%	Caroline St-Hilaire†
Saint-Bruno—Saint-Hubert	Carole Lavallée; 23,767; 44.99%	Nicole Charbonneau Baron; 8,125; 15.38%	Pierre Diamond; 11,755; 22.25%	Vesna Vesic; 7,154; 13.54%	Simon Bernier; 2,031; 3.84%		Carole Lavallée
Saint-Jean	Claude Bachand; 26,506; 49.61%	Marie-Josée Mercier; 9,281; 17.37%	Claire Ste-Marie; 9,430; 17.65%	Philippe Refghi; 5,529; 10.35%	Pierre Tremblay; 2,160; 4.04%	Guy Berger (Ind.); 520; 0.97%	Claude Bachand
Saint-Lambert	Josée Beaudin; 16,346; 37.63%	Patrick Clune; 6,867; 15.81%	Roxane Stanners; 12,383; 28.50%	Richard Marois; 6,280; 14.46%	Diane Joubert; 1,566; 3.60%		Vacant
Vaudreuil-Soulanges	Meili Faille; 27,044; 41.34%	Michael M. Fortier; 15,496; 23.69%	Brigitte Legault; 13,954; 21.33%	Maxime Héroux-Legault; 6,298; 9.62%	Jean-Yves Massenet; 2,625; 4.01%		Meili Faille
Verchères—Les Patriotes	Luc Malo; 27,602; 50.85%	Benoît Dussault; 7,742; 14.26%	François Fournier; 8,871; 16.34%	Raphaël Fortin; 8,388; 15.45%	Annie Morel; 1,679; 3.09%		Luc Malo

=== 2006 ===
Electoral district	Candidates						Incumbent
Electoral district	BQ	Liberal	Conservative	NDP	Green	Other	Incumbent
Beauharnois—Salaberry	Claude DeBellefeuille; 26,190; 47.53%	John Khawand; 8,272; 15.01%	David Couturier; 14,609; 26.51%	Cynthia Roy; 4,163; 7.56%	David Smith; 1,864; 3.38%		Alain Boire†
Brossard—La Prairie	Marcel Lussier; 21,433; 37.17%	Jacques Saada; 20,190; 35.01%	Tenzin D. Khangsar; 9,749; 16.91%	Robert Nicolas; 4,301; 7.46%	François Desgroseilliers; 1,883; 3.27%	Normand Chouinard (M-L); 110; 0.19%	Jacques Saada
Chambly—Borduas	Yves Lessard; 33,703; 54.70%	Chantal Bouchard; 6,933; 11.25%	Yves Bourassa; 12,703; 20.62%	Alain Dubois; 5,167; 8.39%	Olivier Adam; 3,113; 5.05%		Yves Lessard
Châteauguay—Saint-Constant	Carole Freeman; 28,274; 51.38%	Charles Ghorayeb; 10,295; 18.71%	Rosaire Turcot; 11,219; 20.39%	Ehsan Mohammadian; 2,865; 5.21%	Alain Rioux; 2,375; 4.32%		Denise Poirier-Rivard†
Longueuil—Pierre-Boucher	Caroline St-Hilaire; 27,425; 55.20%	Lancine Diawara; 6,260; 12.60%	Sébastien Legris; 9,331; 18.78%	Philippe Haese; 4,273; 8.60%	Adam Sommerfeld; 1,995; 4.02%	David Fiset (Mar.); 397; 0.80%	Caroline St-Hilaire
Saint-Bruno—Saint-Hubert	Carole Lavallée; 26,509; 50.29%	Kerline Joseph; 8,643; 16.40%	Nicolas Waldteufel; 10,451; 19.83%	Marie Henretta; 4,359; 8.27%	Elisabeth Papin; 2,364; 4.48%	Jules Édouard Gaudet (Ind.); 387; 0.73%	Carole Lavallée
Saint-Jean	Claude Bachand; 28,070; 53.98%	Maro Akoury; 6,426; 12.36%	Francis Lévesque; 11,516; 22.14%	Mathieu-Gilles Lanciault; 3,622; 6.96%	Véronique Bisaillon; 2,371; 4.56%		Claude Bachand
Saint-Lambert	Maka Kotto; 20,949; 45.30%	Jean-Jacques Hermans; 10,777; 23.31%	Patrick Clune; 9,097; 19.67%	Ronaldo Garcia; 3,404; 7.36%	Sonia Ziadé; 1,819; 3.93%	Normand Fournier (M-L); 196; 0.42%	Maka Kotto
Vaudreuil-Soulanges	Meili Faille; 26,925; 43.08%	Marc Garneau; 17,774; 28.44%	Stéphane Bourgon; 11,888; 19.02%	Bert Markgraf; 3,468; 5.55%	Pierre Pariseau Legault; 2,450; 3.92%		Meili Faille
Verchères—Les Patriotes	Luc Malo; 30,250; 57.43%	Alanna Woods; 4,602; 8.74%	Jean-Félix Racicot; 11,479; 21.79%	Simon Vallée; 4,293; 8.15%	Carl Danis; 2,047; 3.89%		Vacant (Note: Formerly held by Bloc MP Stéphane Bergeron, resigned November 9, 2005)

=== 2004 ===
Electoral district	Candidates						Incumbent
Electoral district	Liberal	BQ	Conservative	NDP	Green	Other	Incumbent
Beauharnois—Salaberry	Serge Marcil; 18,293; 34.62%	Alain Boire; 26,775; 50.67%	Dominique Bellemare; 4,864; 9.20%	Ligy Alakkattussery; 1,018; 1.93%	Rémi Pelletier; 1,415; 2.68%	Félix Malboeuf (Mar.); 480; 0.91%	Serge Marcil
Brossard—La Prairie	Jacques Saada; 24,155; 45.90%	Marcel Lussier; 21,596; 41.04%	Robert Nicolas; 3,107; 5.90%	Nadia Alexan; 2,321; 4.41%	Cécile Bissonnette; 1,340; 2.55%	Yves Le Seigle (M-L); 109; 0.21%	Jacques Saada
Chambly—Borduas	Sophie Joncas; 12,694; 22.75%	Yves Lessard; 33,945; 60.85%	Lucien Richard; 4,219; 7.56%	Daniel Blouin; 2,681; 4.81%	Benoit Lapointe; 2,248; 4.03%		Ghislain Lebel† (Note: Lebel formerly Bloc Québécois.); Chambly
Châteauguay—Saint-Constant	Robert Lanctôt; 15,384; 30.04%	Denise Poirier-Rivard; 29,337; 57.28%	Rosaire Turcot; 2,902; 5.67%	Mélanie Archambault; 1,704; 3.33%	Marc-André Gadoury; 1,889; 3.69%		Robert Lanctôt (Note: Lanctôt defected from the Bloc Québécois in December 2003.); Châteauguay
Longueuil	Robert Gladu; 12,363; 25.56%	Caroline St-Hilaire; 29,473; 60.94%	Richard Bélisle; 2,354; 4.87%	Nicole Fournier-Sylvester; 2,512; 5.19%	Michel Bédard; 1,263; 2.61%	David Fiset (Mar.); 401; 0.83%	Caroline St-Hilaire
Saint-Bruno—Saint-Hubert	Marc Savard; 15,457; 30.37%	Carole Lavallée; 28,050; 55.11%	Jean-François Mongeau; 3,189; 6.27%	Marie Henretta; 2,253; 4.43%	Janis Crawford; 1,349; 2.65%	David Vachon (Mar.); 596; 1.17%	Pierrette Venne† (Note: Venne is formerly Bloc Québécois.)
Saint-Jean	Michel Fecteau; 12,729; 25.95%	Claude Bachand; 29,485; 60.11%	Joseph Khoury; 3,856; 7.86%	Jonathan Trépanier; 1,687; 3.44%	Claude Genest; 1,298; 2.65%		Claude Bachand
Saint-Lambert	Yolande Thibeault; 16,654; 36.93%	Maka Kotto; 22,024; 48.84%	Patrick Clune; 2,739; 6.07%	Monique Garcia; 2,130; 4.72%	Diane Joubert; 1,404; 3.11%	Normand Fournier (M-L); 145; 0.32%	Yolande Thibeault
Vaudreuil-Soulanges	Nick Discepola; 21,613; 38.80%	Meili Faille; 24,675; 44.29%	Robert Ramage; 4,558; 8.18%	Bert Markgraf; 2,175; 3.90%	Julie C. Baribeau; 2,103; 3.77%	Charles Soucy (Mar.); 585; 1.05%	Nick Discepola
Verchères—Les-Patriotes	Nathalie Tousignant; 9,958; 20.20%	Stéphane Bergeron; 33,333; 67.62%	Francis-Pierre Rémillard; 2,750; 5.58%	Simon Vallée; 1,815; 3.68%	Philippe Morlighem; 975; 1.98%	Sébastien Drouin (Mar.); 463; 0.94%	Stéphane Bergeron

==== Maps ====
1. Beauharnois-Salaberry
2. Brossard-La Prairie
3. Chambly-Borduas
4. Châteauguay-Saint-Constant
5. Longueuil
6. Saint-Bruno-Saint-Hubert
7. Saint-Jean
8. Saint-Lambert
9. Vaudreuil-Soulanges
10. Verchères-Les-Patriotes
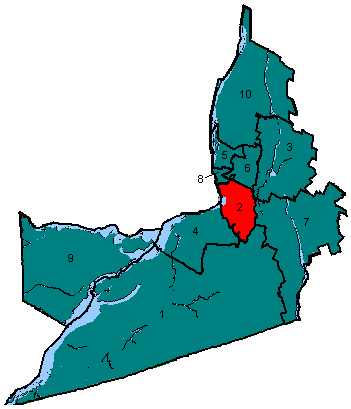
Key map

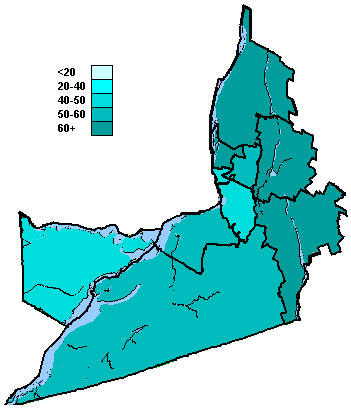
Bloc Québécois

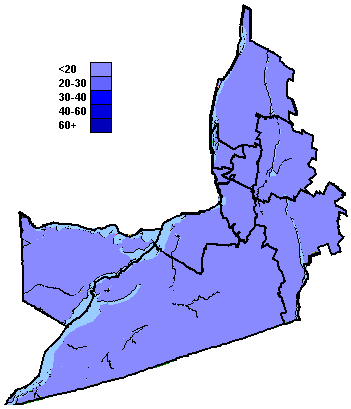
Conservative Party of Canada

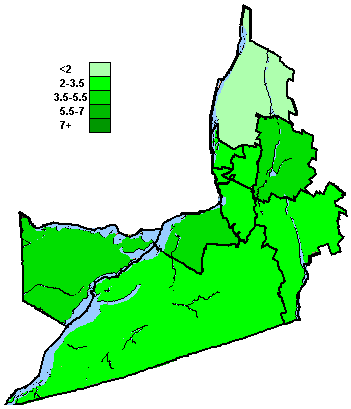
Green Party of Canada

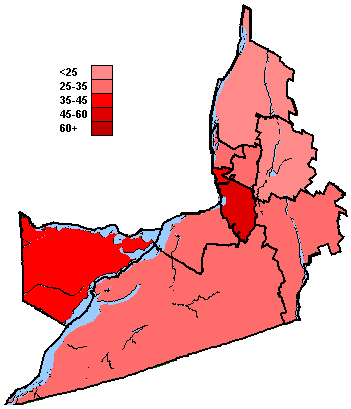
Liberal Party of Canada

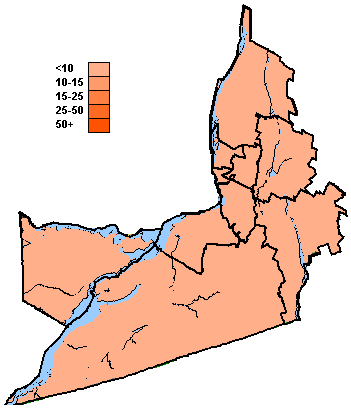
New Democratic Party

=== 2000 ===
Electoral district	Candidates						Incumbent
Electoral district	BQ	Liberal	Canadian Alliance	NDP	PC	Other	Incumbent
Beauharnois—Salaberry	Daniel Turp; 20,938; 42.39%	Serge Marcil; 23,834; 48.26%	Stephane Renaud; 1,782; 3.61%	Elizabeth Clark; 703; 1.42%	Roma Myre; 2,133; 4.32%		Daniel Turp
Brossard—La Prairie	Nicolas Tétrault; 16,758; 32.94%	Jacques Saada; 26,806; 52.69%	Richard Bélisle; 2,973; 5.84%	Clémence Provencher; 852; 1.67%	Sylvain St-Louis; 2,783; 5.47%	Normand Chouinard (M-L); 172 0.34% Sylvia Larrass (NLP); 528 1.04%	Jacques Saada
Chambly	Ghislain Lebel; 26,084; 49.94%	Denis Caron; 17,400; 33.31%	Gaétan Paquette; 2,780; 5.32%	Darren O'Toole; 769; 1.47%	Jacques Parenteau; 3,448; 6.60%	Sébastien Duclos (Mar.); 1,751; 3.35%	Ghislain Lebel
Châteauguay	Robert Lanctôt; 26,284; 47.12%	Carole Marcil; 22,972; 41.18%	Ricardo Lopez; 3,120; 5.59%	Robert Lindblad; 622; 1.12%	Réjeanne Rioux; 2,041; 3.66%	Margaret Larrass (NLP); 743; 1.33%	Maurice Godin†
Longueuil	Caroline St-Hilaire; 20,868; 52.25%	Sophie Joncas; 12,991; 32.53%	Michel Minguy; 2,066; 5.17%	Timothy Spurr; 655; 1.64%	Richard Lafleur; 2,210; 5.53%	Stéphane Chénier (M-L); 183 0.46% David Fiset (Mar.); 968 2.42%	Caroline St-Hilaire
Saint-Bruno—Saint-Hubert	Pierrette Venne; 22,217; 43.98%	Claude Leblanc; 19,743; 39.08%	Jean Vézina; 3,305; 6.54%	Marie Henretta; 1,029; 2.04%	Otmane Brixi; 2,673; 5.29%	Maryève Daigle (Mar.); 1,546; 3.06%	Pierrette Venne
Saint-Jean	Claude Bachand; 22,686; 47.44%	Joseph Khoury; 17,262; 36.09%	Josée Coulombe; 3,169; 6.63%	Julien Patenaude; 698; 1.46%	Gérald L'Ecuyer; 2,764; 5.78%	Marc St-Jean (Mar.); 1,246; 2.61%	Claude Bachand
Saint-Lambert	Christian Picard; 16,519; 38.11%	Yolande Thibeault; 19,679; 45.40%	Nic Leblanc; 3,066; 7.07%		Walter Stirling; 2,704; 6.24%	Katherine Léveillé (Mar.); 1,377; 3.18%	Yolande Thibeault
Vaudreuil-Soulanges	Éric Cimon; 17,587; 34.49%	Nick Discepola; 26,292; 51.56%	Dean Drysdale; 4,188; 8.21%	Shaun G. Lynch; 904; 1.77%	Stratos Psarianos; 2,020; 3.96%		Nick Discepola
Verchères—Les Patriotes	Stéphane Bergeron; 28,696; 52.29%	Mark Provencher; 16,740; 30.50%	Stéphane Désilets; 2,870; 5.23%	Charles Bussières; 1,074; 1.96%	Frédéric Grenier; 3,859; 7.03%	Jonathan Bérubé (Mar.); 1,643; 2.99%	Stéphane Bergeron; Verchères

=== 1997 ===
Electoral district	Candidates						Incumbent
Electoral district	BQ	Liberal	PC	Reform	NDP	Other	Incumbent
Beauharnois—Salaberry	Daniel Turp; 20,449	Linda Julien; 17,226	Dominique Bellemare; 13,160		Erin Runions; 652		Laurent Lavigne
Brossard—La Prairie	Françoise Bélanger; 17,342	Jacques Saada; 24,676	Kiet Ngo; 9,982		Samantha McGavin; 906		Richard Bélisle; La Prairie
Chambly	Ghislain Lebel; 26,109	Nicole Bourget-Laramée; 14,061	Jacques Parenteau; 11,802		Darren O'Toole; 998		Ghislain Lebel
Châteauguay	Maurice Godin; 25,909	Sergio Pavone; 19,167	George F. Lavoie; 11,112		Hannah Rogers; 794		Maurice Godin
Longueuil	Caroline St-Hilaire; 20,977	Carole Marcil; 12,247	François Leduc; 7,773		Maurice Auzat; 857		Caroline St-Hilaire
Saint-Bruno—Saint-Hubert	Pierrette Venne; 23,759	Claude LeBlanc; 17,279	Camille Bolté; 10,579		Marie Henretta; 1,032		Pierrette Venne
Saint-Jean	Claude Bachand; 22,441	Diane MacDonald; 13,239	Gérald L'Ecuyer; 11,938		Julien Patenaude; 755	André Davignon (M.-L.); 347	Claude Bachand
Saint-Lambert	Richard Bélisle; 18,458	Yolande Thibeault; 19,436	Jean-Frédéric Lafontaine; 8,084		Allison Engel; 921	Jean-Louis Pagé (CAP); 304	New District
Vaudreuil-Soulanges	René St-Onge; 17,574	Nick Discepola; 23,676	Jean Lajoie; 9,760	Peter McLoughlin; 573	Jason Sigurdson; 538	Eric E. Simon (NL); 490	Nick Discepola; Vaudreuil
Verchères	Stéphane Bergeron; 30,074	Pierre Patenaude; 12,715	Jean Legault; 12,428		Yas Etessam; 750		Stéphane Bergeron

=== 1993 ===
Electoral district	Candidates						Incumbent
Electoral district	BQ	Liberal	PC	NDP	Commonwealth of Canada	Other	Incumbent
Beauharnois—Salaberry	Laurent Lavigne; 25,934	Linda Julien; 15,867	Marie-Andrée McSween; 7,687	Marc Dubuc; 985			Jean-Guy Hudon
Chambly	Ghislain Lebel; 36,485	Jean-Claude Villiard; 17,803	Hélène Tremblay; 4,760	François Côté; 1,796	Marcel Marjot; 277		Phil Edmonston
Châteauguay	Maurice Godin; 34,271	Kimon Valaskakis; 18,012	Ricardo López; 5,749	Luc Proulx; 850	Stéphane Beauregard; 317		Ricardo López
La Prairie	Richard Bélisle; 27,490	Jacques Saada; 27,014	Fernand Jourdenais; 7,852	Mohamed Akoum; 708	Alain Gauthier; 200	Pierre Montpetit (NL); 691	Fernand Jourdenais
Longueuil	Nic Leblanc; 39,734	Guy Chartrand; 14,955	Richard Ledoux; 4,512	Sergio Martinez; 985	Dany Lépine; 262		Nic Leblanc
Saint-Hubert	Pierrette Venne; 34,701	Angéline Fournier; 19,668	Jean Lesage; 4,545	Nathalie Rochefort; 904	Bruno Lipke; 269	Jean Cerigo (NL); 863; Claude K. Alain (Nat); 339	Pierrette Venne
Saint-Jean	Claude Bachand; 29,753	Delbert Deschambault; 14,244	Clément Couture; 7,795	Jutta Teigeler; 504	Guy David; 105	Alain Longpré (NL); 872	Clément Couture
Vaudreuil	Mario Turbide; 25,133	Nick Discepola; 31,120	Richard Préfontaine; 6,459	Yves Marie Christin; 1,107	Robert Charles; 186	Eric E. Simon (NL); 727; Neal Ford (Lib.); 438	Pierre Cadieux
Verchères	Stéphane Bergeron; 38,536	Benoît Chiquette; 12,138	François Leduc; 5,221	Frances Elbourne; 695	Nicholas Maris; 179	Jean Blaquière (CHP); 47	Marcel Danis

=== 1988 ===
Electoral district	Candidates						Incumbent
Electoral district	Liberal	PC	NDP	Rhinoceros	Green	Other	Incumbent
Beauharnois—Salaberry	Linda Julien; 13,351	Jean-Guy Hudon; 29,141	Daniel Payette; 5,937	Robert Joseph Hamon; 729	Luc Bergevin; 771		Jean-Guy Hudon
Chambly	Bernard Loiselle; 10,886	Richard Grisé; 25,770	Phil Edmonston; 17,268	Stéphane Desmarteau; 792		Gilles Racine (PfC); 64	Richard Grisé
Châteauguay	Jean-Marc Fournier; 16,422	Ricardo López; 22,439	Pierre Hétu; 8,282	Hubert Le Tube Simon; 1,250		André Turcot (Ind); 1,724	Ricardo López
La Prairie	Pierre Deniger; 19,497	Fernand Jourdenais; 30,834	Bruce Katz; 6,228	Marc-André Shakespeare Audet; 1,378		Alain Gauthier (PfC); 186	Fernand Jourdenais
Longueuil	Michel Dupuy; 12,328	Nic Leblanc; 29,054	Daniel Senez; 10,681	Sylvie Legs Legault; 2,080		Serge Lachapelle (Ind); 233; Louis Dubé (PfC); 163	Nic Leblanc
Saint-Hubert	Raymond Dupont; 15,209	Pierrette Venne; 25,573	Nicole Desranleau; 9,435	Jean Nonobstant Thibault; 1,222	Patricia Métivier; 718	Jean-Sébastien Tremblay (PfC); 132	New district
Saint-Jean	Gilles Dolbec; 14,643	Clément Couture; 27,685	Rezeq Faraj; 5,786	Sylvio Dubois; 1,084			André Bissonnette
Vaudreuil	Jean Blais; 16,393	Pierre Cadieux; 30,392	Suzanne Aubertin; 6,185	Maureen Decelles; 671	Yves-Marie Christin; 912	Isajlovic Momcilo (PfC); 43	Pierre Cadieux
Verchères	Maurice Lemoine; 8,487	Marcel Danis; 32,317	Maria Jean; 6,772	Michel Ben 97 Benoit; 1,260		Roland Coté (PfC); 95	Marcel Danis

=== 1984 ===
Electoral district	Candidates							Incumbent
Electoral district	Liberal	PC	NDP	Rhinoceros	Parti nationaliste	Commonwealth of Canada	Libertarian	Incumbent
Beauharnois—Salaberry	Jean-Guy Gaudreau; 11,395	Jean-Guy Hudon; 27,614	Gus Callaghan; 2,720	Réal Le Parfait Gingras; 1,216	Maurice Vaudrin; 798			Gérald Laniel
Chambly	Raymond Dupont; 18,078	Richard Grisé; 31,535	Clifford D. Hastings; 6,783	Bertrand Plastic Loiselle; 2,328	Claude J. A. Hosson; 1,942	Louis A. Deserres; 189		Raymond Dupont
Châteauguay	Ian Watson; 17,313	Ricardo López; 21,318	Robert Vigneault; 5,083		Jean-Guy Lafrenaye; 1,630	Gilles A. Grisé; 124	Guy Pelletier; 284	Ian Watson
La Prairie	Pierre Deniger; 25,182	Fernand Jourdenais; 26,506	Lyse Chevalier-Grégoire; 8,202	Monique Spazzola Fisicaro; 1,851	Marian Wecowsk; 1,373	Jean-Pierre Gélineau; 157		Pierre Deniger
Longueuil	Jacques Olivier; 19,654	Nic Leblanc; 28,956	Claire Gagnon; 6,401	Robert Millet-Lynch dit Bagno; 2,503	Denise Imbeau; 3,054	André Rouillard; 73		Jacques Olivier
Saint-Jean	Paul-André Massé; 14,823	André Bissonnette; 30,769	Todd Sloan; 3,642	Gaëtan dit Paco Pelletier; 1,209	Luc Choinière; 1,002	Pierre Talbot; 45		Paul-André Massé
Vaudreuil	Hal Herbert; 20,362	Pierre Cadieux; 37,499	Anne Erskine; 7,993	Nicole B.D. Pans; 1,470	Benoît Duchesne; 1,017	Jacques Cartier; 139	Gordon Gouldson; 345	Hal Herbert
Verchères	Bernard Loiselle; 19,365	Marcel Danis; 38,690	James Christie; 6,534	Miko Maillot; 2,216	Michel Lepage; 2,153	Michel A. Lemire; 101		Bernard Loiselle
