= Paul-André Massé =

Canadian politician (1947–2019)

Member of Parliament for Saint-Jean
- In office 1979–1984
- Preceded by: Walter Bernard Smith
- Succeeded by: André Bissonnette

Personal details
- Born: 5 November 1947 Saint-Jean-sur-Richelieu, Quebec, Canada
- Died: 17 March 2019 (aged 71) Saint-Jean-sur-Richelieu, Quebec, Canada
- Party: Liberal
- Profession: public servant

Paul-André Massé (5 November 1947 – 17 March 2019) was a Liberal party member of the House of Commons of Canada. He was a public servant by career.

Born in Saint-Jean-sur-Richelieu, Quebec, Massé represented Quebec's Saint-Jean electoral district, winning the seat in the 1979 federal election. Massé was re-elected in the 1980 election, but lost in 1984 to André Bissonnette of the Progressive Conservative party. Massé served in the 31st and 32nd Canadian Parliaments.
