= Maurice Godin =

Maurice Godin may refer to:

- Maurice Godin (politician)
- Maurice Godin (actor)
