= Luther Hamilton Holton =

Canadian politician

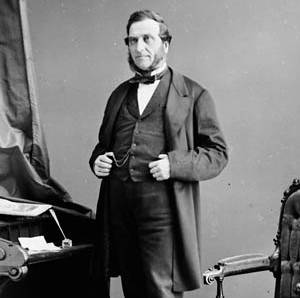

Member of the Canadian Parliament for Châteauguay
- In office 1867–1880
- Succeeded by: Edward Holton

Member of the Legislative Assembly of Quebec for Montréal-Centre
- In office 1871–1874
- Preceded by: Edward Carter
- Succeeded by: Charles Alexander

Personal details
- Born: January 22, 1817 Sheffield's Corner, Upper Canada
- Died: March 14, 1880 (aged 63) Ottawa, Ontario
- Party: Liberal

Luther Hamilton Holton (January 22, 1817 – March 14, 1880) was a Canadian businessman and political figure. He represented Châteauguay as a Liberal member in the House of Commons of Canada from 1867 to 1880. He became Minister of Finance, Governor of McGill University, board member of the Montreal Board of Trade, and an early developer of the railroads in Canada.

== Early life and education ==
He was born at Sheffield's Corners in Leeds County, Upper Canada in 1817 and went to Montreal to live with his uncle after his father's death in 1826. At the age of 12, after completing his schooling, he became a clerk in his uncle's business. Seven years later, he joined the firm of Henderson and Hooker, who were involved in transporting goods and passengers along the St. Lawrence and lower Great Lakes; in 1845, he became a senior partner in the firm, now Hooker and Holton, on Henderson's death.

In 1842, he helped found the Unitarian Society of Montreal. In 1846, he was elected to the Montreal Board of Trade. He supported reciprocity in trade with the United States and, for a time, he supported annexation. During the 1850s, he became involved in railway development and played an important role in the development of the Grand Trunk Railway in Canada. For a time, he was a director for the Grand Trunk and, in 1853, formed a firm with Alexander Tilloch Galt and others which was contracted to extend their tracks from Toronto to Sarnia. Both Holton and Galt were heavily criticized for taking advantage of their government connections to win the contract and gain government subsidies.

He was a member of the city council for Montreal from 1850 to 1851. In 1854, he was elected to the Legislative Assembly of the Province of Canada and represented the city of Montreal. He supported an elected Legislative Council, secularization of the clergy reserves and putting an end to seigneurial tenure. In 1857, he retired from his association with the Grand Trunk with the intention of devoting his attention to politics but was defeated in the next general election.

In 1862, he was elected to the Legislative Council for Victoria District. In 1863, he resigned to become minister of finance in the government of John Sandfield Macdonald and Antoine-Aimé Dorion; when he ran for a seat in the Legislative Assembly, he was defeated in Montreal Centre but elected in Châteauguay. In 1864, Holton transferred the public accounts from the Bank of Upper Canada to the Bank of Montreal, which led to the failure of the Upper Canada bank a few years later. He opposed Confederation because of his concerns about its effect on Lower Canada, but, after 1867, helped promote its acceptance in Quebec.

He represented Montréal-Centre in the Quebec Legislative Assembly from 1871 until 1874, when the dual mandate became illegal (holding seats both federally and provincially). He supported amnesty for Louis Riel.

He also served as a Governor of McGill University from 1876 to 1880.

He died in office at Ottawa in 1880.

His son Edward succeeded him as representative for Châteauguay in the House of Commons.

== Electoral history ==
1867 Canadian federal election: Châteauguay
Party	Candidate	Votes
Liberal	Luther Hamilton Holton	1,013
Unknown	Thomas Kennedy Ramsay	586

1872 Canadian federal election: Châteauguay
Party	Candidate	Votes
Liberal	Luther Hamilton Holton	907
Unknown	R. Stuart	669
Source: Canadian Elections Database

1874 Canadian federal election: Châteauguay
Party	Candidate	Votes
Liberal	Luther Hamilton Holton	911
Unknown	J. Tantone	519
Source: Canadian Elections Database

1878 Canadian federal election: Châteauguay
Party	Candidate	Votes
Liberal	Luther Hamilton Holton	936
Unknown	L. A. Seers	757
Source: Canadian Elections Database
