= Châteauguay (federal electoral district) =

Former federal electoral district in Quebec, Canada

Quebec electoral district

Defunct federal electoral district
- Legislature: House of Commons
- District created: 1976
- District abolished: 2003
- First contested: 1979
- Last contested: 2000

Châteauguay was a federal electoral district in Quebec, Canada, that was represented in the House of Commons of Canada from 1867 to 1917 and from 1979 to 2004.

== History ==
It was created by the British North America Act 1867. In 1914, it was amalgamated with Huntingdon to become Châteauguay—Huntingdon riding.

The riding was recreated in 1976 from portions of La Prairie and Beauharnois—Salaberry ridings. It consisted of:

- the Towns of Châteauguay, Châteauguay-Centre, Delson, Léry, Mercier, Sainte-Catherine, Saint-Constant and Saint-Rémi;
- in the County of Châteauguay: the parish municipalities of Sainte-Clothilde, Sainte-Martine and Saint-Urbain-Premier; the municipality of Saint-Paul-de-Châteauguay;
- in the County of Laprairie: the parish municipality of Saint-Isidore; the municipality of Saint-Mathieu; the Indian Reserve of Caughnawaga No. 14; and
- in the County of Napierville: the parish municipalities of Saint-Michel and Saint-Rémi.

In 1987, it was redefined to consist of:

- the Towns of Châteauguay, Delson, Mercier, Sainte-Catherine, Saint-Constant and Saint-Rémi;
- in the County of Laprairie: the parish municipalities of Saint-Isidore, Saint-Jacques-le-Mineur and Saint-Philippe; the Municipality of Saint-Mathieu; the Indian Reserve of Kahnawake No. 14; and
- in the County of Napierville: the parish municipalities of Saint-Édouard, Saint-Michel and Saint-Patrick-de-Sherrington.

In 1996, it was redefined to consist of:

- the cities of Châteauguay, Delson, Léry, Mercier, Saint-Constant, Saint-Rémi and Sainte-Catherine;
- the County Regional Municipality of Roussillon, including Kahnawake Indian Reserve No. 14 (Caughnawaga), excepting: the cities of Candiac and La Prairie; the Parish Municipality of Saint-Philippe; and
- in the County Regional Municipality of Les Jardins-de-Napierville: the parish municipalities of Saint-Édouard, Saint-Jacques-le-Mineur and Saint-Michel.

It was abolished in 2003 when it was redistributed into Beauharnois—Salaberry, Saint-Jean and Châteauguay—Saint-Constant ridings.

== Members of Parliament ==
This riding elected the following members of Parliament:

Parliament	Years	Member	Party
Châteauguay
1st	1867–1872	Luther Hamilton Holton	Liberal
2nd	1872–1874	Luther Hamilton Holton	Liberal
3rd	1874–1878	Luther Hamilton Holton	Liberal
4th	1878–1880	Luther Hamilton Holton	Liberal
4th	1880–1882	Edward Holton	Liberal
5th	1882–1887	Edward Holton	Liberal
6th	1887–1891	Edward Holton	Liberal
7th	1891–1896	James Pollock Brown	Liberal
8th	1896–1900	James Pollock Brown	Liberal
9th	1900–1904	James Pollock Brown	Liberal
10th	1904–1908	James Pollock Brown	Liberal
11th	1908–1911	James Pollock Brown	Liberal
12th	1911–1913	James Pollock Brown	Liberal
12th	1913–1917	James Morris	Conservative
Riding dissolved into Châteauguay—Huntingdon
Riding re-created from Laprairie and Beauharnois—Salaberry
31st	1979–1980	Ian Watson	Liberal
32nd	1980–1984	Ian Watson	Liberal
33rd	1984–1988	Ricardo López	Progressive Conservative
34th	1988–1993	Ricardo López	Progressive Conservative
35th	1993–1997	Maurice Godin	Bloc Québécois
36th	1997–2000	Maurice Godin	Bloc Québécois
37th	2000–2003	Robert Lanctôt	Bloc Québécois
37th	2003–2004	Robert Lanctôt	Liberal
Riding dissolved into Beauharnois—Salaberry, Saint-Jean and Châteauguay—Saint-Constant

== Election results ==
=== 1867 – 1917 ===
1867 Canadian federal election
Party	Candidate	Votes
Liberal	Luther Hamilton Holton	1,013
Unknown	Thomas Kennedy Ramsay	586

1872 Canadian federal election
Party	Candidate	Votes
Liberal	Luther Hamilton Holton	907
Unknown	R. Stuart	669
Source: Canadian Elections Database

1874 Canadian federal election
Party	Candidate	Votes
Liberal	Luther Hamilton Holton	911
Unknown	J. Tantone	519
Source: Canadian Elections Database

1878 Canadian federal election
Party	Candidate	Votes
Liberal	Luther Hamilton Holton	936
Unknown	L. A. Seers	757

By-election: On Mr. Holton's death, 14 March 1880

By-election on 17 April 1880
Party	Candidate	Votes
Liberal	Edward Holton	838
Unknown	P. Laberge	725

1882 Canadian federal election
Party	Candidate	Votes
Liberal	Edward Holton	860
Unknown	F. A. Quinn	799

1887 Canadian federal election
Party	Candidate	Votes
Liberal	Edward Holton	1,120
Conservative	Michael Joseph Francis Quinn	767

1891 Canadian federal election
Party	Candidate	Votes
Liberal	James Pollock Brown	1,246
Independent	R. N. Walsh	1,148

1896 Canadian federal election
Party	Candidate	Votes
Liberal	James Pollock Brown	1,594
Conservative	C. Lecavalier	894

1900 Canadian federal election
Party	Candidate	Votes
Liberal	James Pollock Brown	1,301
Conservative	William Greig	872

1904 Canadian federal election
Party	Candidate	Votes
Liberal	James Pollock Brown	1,370
Conservative	John George Bryson	906

1908 Canadian federal election
Party	Candidate	Votes
Liberal	James Pollock Brown	1,397
Conservative	Campbell Lane	1,092

1911 Canadian federal election
Party	Candidate	Votes
Liberal	James Pollock Brown	1,281
Conservative	James Morris	1,241

By-election: On Mr. Brown's death, 30 May 1913

By-election on 11 October 1913
Party	Candidate	Votes
Conservative	James Morris	1,412
Liberal	Sydney Arthur Fisher	1,267

=== 1979 - 2004 ===
1979 Canadian federal election
Party	Candidate	Votes
Liberal	Ian Watson	27,485
Progressive Conservative	Yves Longtin	5,909
Social Credit	Jean Lachaine	3,668
New Democratic	Ginette Bourdon	2,404
Rhinoceros	Cher Logue Georges Duchesne	883
Union populaire	Guy Cousineau	213

1980 Canadian federal election
Party	Candidate	Votes
Liberal	Ian Watson	27,152
New Democratic	William W. Evans	4,203
Progressive Conservative	Jean Dugre	3,311
Social Credit	Paul-André Boucher	1,182
Union populaire	Jean-Denis Paquette	570
Marxist–Leninist	Jane Woods	199
lop.parl.ca

1984 Canadian federal election
Party	Candidate	Votes
Progressive Conservative	Ricardo López	21,318
Liberal	Ian Watson	17,313
New Democratic	Robert Vigneault	5,083
Parti nationaliste	Jean-Guy Lafrenaye	1,630
Libertarian	Guy Pelletier	284
Commonwealth of Canada	Gilles A. Grisé	124

1988 Canadian federal election
Party	Candidate	Votes
Progressive Conservative	Ricardo López	22,439
Liberal	Jean-Marc Fournier	16,422
New Democratic	Pierre Hétu	8,282
Not affiliated	André Turcot	1,724
Rhinoceros	Hubert Le Tube Simon	1,250

1993 Canadian federal election
Party	Candidate	Votes
Bloc Québécois	Maurice Godin	34,271
Liberal	Kimon Valaskakis	18,012
Progressive Conservative	Ricardo López	5,749
New Democratic	Luc Proulx	850
Commonwealth of Canada	Stéphane Beauregard	317

1997 Canadian federal election
Party	Candidate	Votes
Bloc Québécois	Maurice Godin	25,909
Liberal	Sergio Pavone	19,167
Progressive Conservative	George F. Lavoie	11,112
New Democratic	Hannah Rogers	794

2000 Canadian federal election
Party	Candidate	Votes
Bloc Québécois	Robert Lanctôt	26,284
Liberal	Carole Marcil	22,972
Alliance	Ricardo López	3,120
Progressive Conservative	Réjeanne Rioux	2,041
Natural Law	Margaret Larrass	743
New Democratic	Robert Lindblad	622

== See also ==
- List of Canadian electoral districts
- Historical federal electoral districts of Canada
