= James Pollock Brown =

Canadian politician

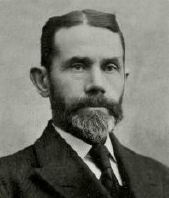

Member of the Canadian Parliament for Châteauguay
- In office 1891–1913
- Preceded by: Edward Holton
- Succeeded by: James Morris

Personal details
- Born: 4 April 1841 Beau River, Canada East
- Died: 30 May 1913 (aged 72)
- Party: Liberal

James Pollock Brown (4 April 1841 – 30 May 1913) was a Canadian politician.

Born in Beau River, Canada East, the son of David Brown and Jean Pollock both from Renfrewshire, Scotland, Brown was educated at the Elementary Schools and the Business College of New Haven, Connecticut. A miller, general store keeper and farmer, he was elected as the Liberal candidate to the House of Commons of Canada for the electoral district of Châteauguay in the general elections of 1891, 1896, 1900, 1904, 1908 and 1911. He died in May 1913, after an illness of two months, and was buried at Russelltown Flats in the present day community of Saint-Chrysostome, Quebec.

== Electoral history ==
1891 Canadian federal election: Châteauguay
Party	Candidate	Votes
Liberal	James Pollock Brown	1,246
Independent	R. N. Walsh	1,148

1896 Canadian federal election: Châteauguay
Party	Candidate	Votes
Liberal	James Pollock Brown	1,594
Conservative	C. Lecavalier	894

1900 Canadian federal election: Châteauguay
Party	Candidate	Votes
Liberal	James Pollock Brown	1,301
Conservative	William Greig	872

1904 Canadian federal election: Châteauguay
Party	Candidate	Votes
Liberal	James Pollock Brown	1,370
Conservative	John George Bryson	906

1908 Canadian federal election: Châteauguay
Party	Candidate	Votes
Liberal	James Pollock Brown	1,397
Conservative	Campbell Lane	1,092

1911 Canadian federal election: Châteauguay
Party	Candidate	Votes
Liberal	James Pollock Brown	1,281
Conservative	James Morris	1,241
