= Edward Holton =

Canadian politician

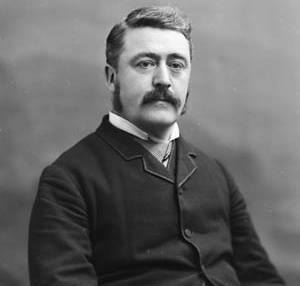

Member of the Canadian Parliament for Châteauguay
- In office 1880–1891
- Preceded by: Luther Hamilton Holton
- Succeeded by: James Pollock Brown

Personal details
- Born: September 1, 1844 Montreal, Canada East
- Died: August 10, 1907 (aged 62)
- Party: Liberal

Edward Holton (September 1, 1844 – August 10, 1907) was a lawyer and political figure in Quebec. He represented Châteauguay in the House of Commons of Canada from 1880 to 1891 as a Liberal member.

He was born in Montreal, Canada East, the son of Luther Hamilton Holton and Eliza Forbes, was educated at McGill University and was called to the Quebec bar in 1867. For a time, he served in the Prince of Wales Rifles. He set up practice in Montreal. Holton was first elected to the House of Commons in an 1880 by-election held after the death of his father and served until his retirement for politics in 1891. In 1873, he married Helen Ford. Holton was managing director and then president of the Herald printing company in Montreal.

== Electoral history ==
By-election: On Mr. Holton's death, 14 March 1880

By-election on 17 April 1880
Party	Candidate	Votes
Liberal	Edward Holton	838
Unknown	P. Laberge	725

1882 Canadian federal election: Châteauguay
Party	Candidate	Votes
Liberal	Edward Holton	860
Unknown	F. A. Quinn	799

1887 Canadian federal election: Châteauguay
Party	Candidate	Votes
Liberal	Edward Holton	1,120
Conservative	Michael Joseph Francis Quinn	767
