= James Morris (Quebec politician) =

Canadian politician

Member of the Canadian Parliament for Châteauguay
- In office 1911–1917
- Preceded by: James Pollock Brown
- Succeeded by: District was abolished in 1914

Personal details
- Born: 16 December 1857 Rutland, Canada West
- Died: 12 June 1931 (aged 73)
- Party: Conservative

James Morris (16 December 1857 – 12 June 1931) was a farmer, marble and granite dealer and political figure in Quebec. He represented Châteauguay in the House of Commons of Canada from 1913 to 1917 as a Conservative.

He was born in Rutland, Canada West, the son of Patrick Morris and Ann McRae, and was educated at Saint-Chrysostome, Quebec. He settled at Aubrey, now listed in the present region. He was mayor of Saint-Chrysostome for two years. He was defeated by James Pollock Brown when he ran for a federal seat in 1911; Morris was elected to the House of Commons in a 1913 by-election held after Brown's death. He was defeated by James Robb when he ran for reelection in the amalgamated riding of Châteauguay—Huntingdon in 1917. He died in Aubrey at the age of 73.

== Electoral history ==
By-election: On Mr. Brown's death, 30 May 1913

By-election on 11 October 1913
Party	Candidate	Votes
Conservative	James Morris	1,412
Liberal	Sydney Arthur Fisher	1,267
