= Alexandra Mendès =

Canadian politician

Alexandra Mendès MP
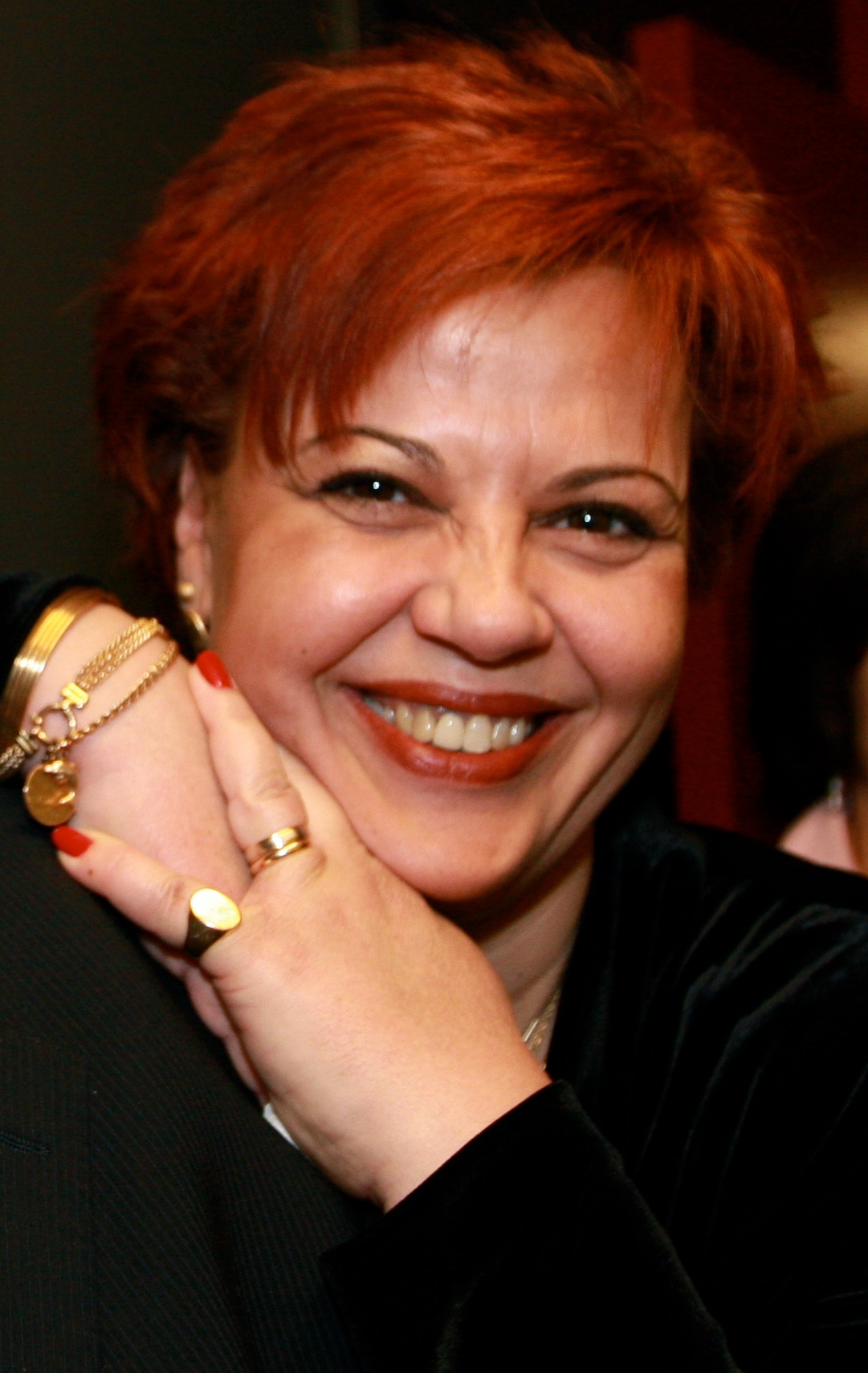
- Mendès in 2011

Member of Parliament for Brossard—Saint-Lambert
- Incumbent
- Assumed office October 19, 2015
- Preceded by: Hoang Mai

Member of Parliament for Brossard—La Prairie
- In office October 14, 2008 – May 2, 2011
- Preceded by: Marcel Lussier
- Succeeded by: Hoang Mai

Personal details
- Born: November 3, 1963 (age 63) Lisbon, Portugal
- Party: Liberal
- Profession: Communications Officer

Alexandra Mendès MP (born November 3, 1963) is a Canadian Liberal politician, currently serving as the Member of Parliament for the riding of Brossard—Saint-Lambert since 2015. She previously served in the House of Commons from 2008 until 2011 as the MP for the riding of Brossard—La Prairie.

== Early life ==
Mendès was born in Portugal and immigrated to Canada with her family in 1978 when she was 15.

== Political career ==
Mendès worked as a constituency assistant to Jacques Saada, who served as a Liberal MP for Brossard—La Prairie from 1997 to 2006. She also taught at the Brossard Portuguese School. Mendès was a Quebec assistant to Bob Rae for a period of eight months during his leadership campaign. She has worked for fifteen years at a settlement organization for new immigrants and refugees at Maison Internationale de la Rive-Sud.

She was elected to the House of Commons in 2008, defeating Bloc Quebecois MP Marcel Lussier, who had defeated her former boss Saada in the previous election. She initially came in second by 102 votes, but a recount ordered by Elections Canada resulted in her winning by a margin of 69 votes. She was defeated in the 2011 election by NDP candidate Hoang Mai.

In August 2011, Mendès announced her candidacy for the presidency of the Liberal Party of Canada. She was defeated in her race for the presidency by Mike Crawley, but remained a committed member of the party, making appearances on CTV and CBC's Power and Politics representing the party. In June 2012, Mendès became President of the Liberal Party's Quebec wing, the Liberal Party of Canada (Quebec).

In the 2015 federal election, Mendès was the Liberal candidate in the newly created riding of Brossard—Saint-Lambert, again facing off against Mai. She defeated Mai, returning to the House of Commons.

On April 6, 2017, Mendès moved a motion "That the House do now proceed to Orders of the Day" during debate on a Question of Privilege of an instance of Members of Parliament having their Rights as Members denied. Such a motion during a debate on a Question of Privilege had never been made before in Canadian Parliamentary History. The Liberal majority voted in favour of Mendès's motion, preventing the issue from being reviewed by the Canadian House of Commons Standing Committee on Procedure and House Affairs.

On April 11, 2017, the Speaker of the House of Commons Geoff Regan said the motion was unprecedented and ruled that the Question of Privilege should be revived.

As a child, Mendès was a member of the Girl Guides of Canada and has spoken in the House of Commons about her view that "much of what (she is) today (she) owes to Guiding".

On February 28, 2019, Mendès created controversy when during an emergency debate on the SNC-Lavalin affair she said "I really do not understand why this is a big deal."

Mendès was re-elected in the 2019 Canadian federal election.

On December 10, 2019, Mendès was appointed Assistant Deputy Speaker and Assistant Deputy Chair of Committees of the Whole

Mendès was re-elected in the 2021 Canadian federal election.

In the 2025 Liberal Party of Canada leadership election, she endorsed Chrystia Freeland. She accused the Trump administration of engaging in "rhetorical acts of war against Canada".

Mendès was re-elected in the 2025 Canadian federal election.

== Personal life ==
Mendes holds dual citizenship for Canada and Portugal. In February 2025, she announced she is undergoing cancer treatment.

== Electoral record ==
2025 Canadian federal election: Brossard—Saint-Lambert
| Party | Candidate | Votes | % | ±% | Expenditures |
|---|---|---|---|---|---|
| Liberal | Alexandra Mendès | 36,541 | 62.21 | +8.11 | $41,475.56 |
| Conservative | William Huynh-Jan | 11,076 | 18.86 | +6.87 | $13,902.01 |
| Bloc Québécois | Soledad Orihuela-Bouchard | 7,837 | 13.34 | –6.60 | $3,049.13 |
| New Democratic | Zeinab Mistou Akkaoui | 2,049 | 3.49 | –6.91 | $317.36 |
| Green | Gregory De Luca | 855 | 1.46 | N/A | $0.00 |
| People's | Hector Huerta | 381 | 0.65 | –1.81 | none listed |
| Total valid votes/expense limit | | 58,739 | 98.94 | +0.34 | $132,960.59 |
| Total rejected ballots | | 632 | 1.06 | –0.34 | |
| Turnout | | 59,371 | 68.33 | +4.45 | |
| Eligible voters | | 86,890 | | | |
| Liberal hold | | Swing | | +0.62 | |
Source: Elections Canada
Note: number of eligible voters does not include voting day registrations.

2021 Canadian federal election: Brossard—Saint-Lambert
| Party | Candidate | Votes | % | ±% | Expenditures |
|---|---|---|---|---|---|
| Liberal | Alexandra Mendès | 28,326 | 54.10 | +0.2 | $43,143.97 |
| Bloc Québécois | Marie-Laurence Desgagné | 10,441 | 19.94 | +0.3 | $2,261.56 |
| Conservative | Marcos Alves | 6,276 | 11.99 | +1.2 | $5,119.08 |
| New Democratic | Marc Audet | 5,442 | 10.39 | +0.9 | $1,969.07 |
| People's | Brenda Ross | 1,288 | 2.46 | +1.6 | $2,754.06 |
| Free | Engineer-Ingénieur Hu | 583 | 1.11 | N/A | $84.25 |
| Total valid votes/expense limit | | 52,356 | 98.60 | – | $113,037.00 |
| Total rejected ballots | | 744 | 1.40 | | |
| Turnout | | 53,100 | 63.88 | | |
| Registered voters | | 83,125 | | | |
| Liberal hold | | Swing | | -0.1 | |
Source: Elections Canada

2019 Canadian federal election: Brossard—Saint-Lambert
| Party | Candidate | Votes | % | ±% | Expenditures |
|---|---|---|---|---|---|
| Liberal | Alexandra Mendès | 30,537 | 53.9 | +3.6 | $51,952.14 |
| Bloc Québécois | Marie-Claude Diotte | 11,131 | 19.6 | +9 | none listed |
| Conservative | Glenn Hoa | 6,112 | 10.8 | -1.6 | $13,207.97 |
| New Democratic | Marc Audet | 5,410 | 9.5 | -15.1 | $4,953.35 |
| Green | Grégory De Luca | 2,935 | 5.2 | +3.3 | $4,793.32 |
| People's | Sam Nassif | 527 | 0.9 | | none listed |
| Total valid votes/expense limit | | 56,652 | 100.0 | | |
| Total rejected ballots | | 657 | | | |
| Turnout | | 57,309 | 68.7 | | |
| Eligible voters | | 83,447 | | | |
| Liberal hold | | Swing | | -2.70 | |
Source: Elections Canada

2015 Canadian federal election: Brossard—Saint-Lambert
| Party | Candidate | Votes | % | ±% | Expenditures |
|---|---|---|---|---|---|
| Liberal | Alexandra Mendès | 28,818 | 50.3 | +17.55 | – |
| New Democratic | Hoang Mai | 14,075 | 24.6 | -12.21 | – |
| Conservative | Qais Hamidi | 7,215 | 12.6 | -0.22 | – |
| Bloc Québécois | Suzanne Lachance | 6,071 | 10.6 | -5.35 | – |
| Green | Fang Hu | 1,089 | 1.9 | +0.39 | – |
| Total valid votes/Expense limit | | 57,260 | 100.0 | | $220,572.15 |
| Total rejected ballots | | 549 | 0.94 | – | |
| Turnout | | 57,809 | 69.16 | – | |
| Eligible voters | | 83,194 | | | |
Source: Elections Canada

2011 Canadian federal election: Brossard—La Prairie
| Party | Candidate | Votes | % | ±% |
|---|---|---|---|---|
| New Democratic | Hoang Mai | 25,512 | 41.02 | +28.31 |
| Liberal | Alexandra Mendès (incumbent) | 16,976 | 27.30 | −5.29 |
| Bloc Québécois | Marcel Lussier | 10,890 | 17.51 | −14.96 |
| Conservative | Maurice Brossard | 7,806 | 12.55 | −6.32 |
| Green | Kevin Murphy | 900 | 1.45 | −1.65 |
| Marxist–Leninist | Normand Chouinard | 110 | 0.18 | −0.09 |
| Total valid votes | | 62,194 | 100.00 | |
| Total rejected ballots | | 569 | | |
| Turnout | | 62,763 | | |
Source: Official Results, Elections Canada.

2008 Canadian federal election: Brossard—La Prairie
| Party | Candidate | Votes | % | ±% | Expenditures |
|---|---|---|---|---|---|
| Liberal | Alexandra Mendès | 19,103 | 32.59 | −2.42 | $36,025 |
| Bloc Québécois | Marcel Lussier | 19,034 | 32.47 | −4.70 | $55,711 |
| Conservative | Maurice Brossard | 11,062 | 18.87 | +1.96 | $66,126 |
| New Democratic | Hoang Mai | 7,452 | 12.71 | +5.25 | $5,453 |
| Green | Sonia Ziadé | 1,816 | 3.10 | −0.17 | $1,057 |
| Marxist–Leninist | Normand Chouinard | 157 | 0.27 | +0.08 | none listed |
| Total valid votes | | 58,624 | 100.00 | | |
| Total rejected ballots | | 563 | | | |
| Turnout | | 59,187 | 64.57 | −2.49 | |
| Electors on the lists | | 91,662 | | | |
Sources: Official Results, Elections Canada and Financial Returns, Elections Canada. Italicized expenditures refer to totals submitted by the candidate and are presented when the reviewed totals are not available.
