= Christine Normandin =

Canadian politician

Christine Normandin MP
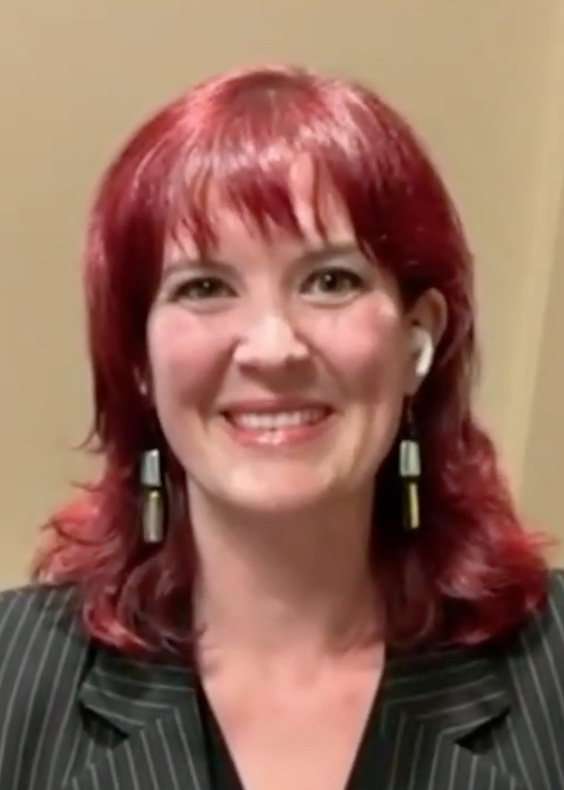

Member of Parliament for Saint-Jean
- Incumbent
- Assumed office October 21, 2019
- Preceded by: Jean Rioux

Personal details
- Born: April 30, 1984 (age 42) Saint-Jean-sur-Richelieu, Quebec
- Party: Bloc Québécois
- Other political affiliations: Parti Québécois (provincial)

Christine Normandin MP (born April 30, 1984) is a Canadian politician, who was first elected to the House of Commons of Canada in the 2019 election. She represents the electoral district of Saint-Jean as a member of the Bloc Québécois.

She was re-elected at the 2021 Canadian federal election. She was then appointed deputy house leader and the critic of national defence in the Bloc Québécois Shadow Cabinet. She was again re-elected in the 2025 Canadian federal election. She was elected vice chair of the Canadian House of Commons Standing Committee on Procedure and House Affairs in the 45th Canadian Parliament in 2025.

At the time of the 2025 Canadian federal election, she lived in Saint-Jean-sur-Richelieu.

== Electoral record ==
2025 Canadian federal election: Saint-Jean
Party	Candidate	Votes	%	±%	Expenditures
Bloc Québécois	Christine Normandin	28,474	44.34	−1.67	$46,950.99
Liberal	Patrick Agbokou	21,999	34.26	+6.14	$30,931.46
Conservative	Marie Louis-Seize	10,480	16.32	+3.58	$1,152.66
New Democratic	Danielle Dubuc	1,650	2.57	−4.71	$482.97
Green	Vincent Piette	988	1.54	−0.59	$2,485.93
People's	Tchad Deschenes	624	0.97	N/A	$0.00
Total valid votes		64,215	98.27	+0.78	$139,276.93
Total rejected ballots		1,133	1.73	–0.78	
Turnout		65,348	69.76		
Eligible voters		93,678			
Bloc Québécois hold		Swing		−3.90	
Source: Elections Canada

2021 Canadian federal election
Party	Candidate	Votes	%	±%
Bloc Québécois	Christine Normandin	27,243	46.0	
Liberal	Jean Rioux	16,650	28.0	
Conservative	Serge Benoit	7,544	12,7	
New Democratic	Jeremy Fournier	4,308	7,3	
Free	Jean-Charles Cléroux	1,790	3.0	
Green	Leigh V. Ryan	1262	2.0	
Indépendance du Québec	Pierre Duteau	413	< 0.1	
Total valid votes				
Total rejected ballots				
Turnout		59,210		
Eligible voters		91,951		
Source: Elections Canada

2019 Canadian federal election: Saint-Jean
Party	Candidate	Votes	%	±%	Expenditures
Bloc Québécois	Christine Normandin	27,750	44.8	+19.99	$14,561.23
Liberal	Jean Rioux	18,906	30.6	-2.56	$111,054.31
Conservative	Martin Thibert	6,612	10.7	-0.15	$12,932.62
New Democratic	Chantal Reeves	4,794	7.7	-21.37	$0.10
Green	André-Philippe Chenail	3,127	5.1	+2.98	$2,436.80
People's	Marc Hivon	397	0.6	–	none listed
Indépendance du Québec	Yvon Savary	289	0.5	–	$137.94
Total valid votes/expense limit		61,875	100.0		
Total rejected ballots		1,241			
Turnout		63,116			
Eligible voters		91,035			
Population		111,190			
Bloc Québécois gain from Liberal		Swing		+11.28	
Source: Elections Canada

Quebec provincial by-election, June 22, 2009: Marguerite-Bourgeoys
Party	Candidate	Votes	%	±%
Liberal	Clément Gignac	7,753	72.41	+6.22
Parti Québécois	Christine Normandin	1,835	17.14	-4.56
Action démocratique	Diane Charbonneau	384	3.59	-5.08
Green	Julien Leclerc	290	2.71	–
Québec solidaire	Valérie Black St-Laurent	265	2.48	-0.96
Independent	Sylvie R. Tremblay	73	0.68	–
Parti indépendantiste	Érik Poulin	66	0.62	–
Independent	Régent Millette	41	0.38	–
Total valid votes		10,707	99.19	–
Total rejected ballots		87	0.81	–
Turnout		10,794	23.22	-24.87
Electors on the lists		46,478	–	–

2008 Quebec general election
Party	Candidate	Votes	%	±%
Liberal	Filomena Rotiroti	16433	73.05	
Parti Québécois	Christine Normandin	3379	15.02	
Action démocratique	Luigi Verrelli	1726	7.67	
Québec solidaire	Celine Gingras	554	2.46	
Independent	Katia Proulx	281	1.25	
People's Front	Garnet Colly	124	0.55	
	Total valid votes	22,497	98.57	
	Total rejected ballots	326	1.43	
	Turnout	22,823	46.95	
	Electors on the lists	48,609		
