= Robert Lanctôt =

Canadian politician and lawyer (born 1963)

Robert Lanctôt (born November 19, 1963) is a former Canadian politician and lawyer.

A lawyer by profession, Lanctôt was elected as a member of Parliament (MP) for the Bloc Québécois in the 2000 federal election representing the riding of Châteauguay. He served in the Bloc Québécois (BQ) shadow cabinet as Critic for Amateur Sport and Children and Youth from 2000 to 2002, Critic for Scrutiny of Regulations from 2001 to 2002 and Critic for Public Works and Government Services from 2002 to 2003.

On December 11, 2003, following Paul Martin's election as leader of the governing Liberal Party of Canada and the day before Martin's swearing in as Prime Minister, Lanctôt crossed the floor to join the Liberals. His defection occurred days after his riding association passed a resolution stating it no longer wished to work with the MP and did not want him to run for the BQ in the next election.

Lanctôt ran as a Liberal in Châteauguay—Saint-Constant in the 2004 federal election but was defeated by the BQ's Denise Poirier-Rivard.

2000 Canadian federal election: Châteauguay
| Party | Candidate | Votes |
|---|---|---|
| Bloc Québécois | Robert Lanctôt | 26,284 |
| Liberal | Carole Marcil | 22,972 |
| Alliance | Ricardo López | 3,120 |
| Progressive Conservative | Réjeanne Rioux | 2,041 |
| Natural Law | Margaret Larrass | 743 |
| New Democratic | Robert Lindblad | 622 |
