= Brossard—La Prairie =

Former federal electoral district in Quebec, Canada

Coordinates: 45°25′N 73°25′W

Quebec electoral district
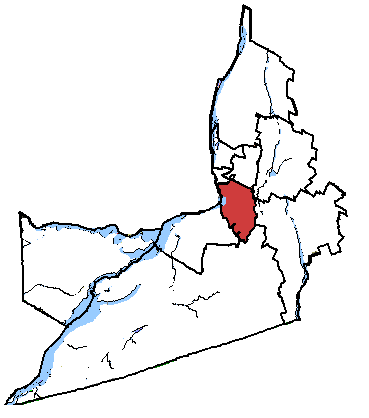
- Brossard—La Prairie in relation to other Montérégie federal electoral districts

Defunct federal electoral district
- Legislature: House of Commons
- District created: 1996
- District abolished: 2013
- First contested: 1997
- Last contested: 2011
- District webpage: profile, map

Demographics
- Population (2011): 128,001
- Electors (2011): 91,662
- Area (km²): 168.14
- Census division: Roussillon RCM
- Census subdivision(s): Brossard, Candiac, La Prairie, Saint-Philippe

Brossard—La Prairie (French pronunciation: [bʁɔsaʁ la pʁɛʁi]) was a federal electoral district in Quebec, Canada, that was represented in the House of Commons of Canada from 1997 to 2015. As of 2011, its population was 128,001.

== Geography ==
The riding was located in the South Shore area of the Montreal metropolitan region, within the Quebec region of Montérégie.

The district included the Cities of Candiac and La Prairie, the Municipality of Saint-Philippe, and the City of Brossard.

The neighbouring ridings were Châteauguay—Saint-Constant, Beauharnois—Salaberry, Saint-Jean, Chambly—Borduas, Saint-Bruno—Saint-Hubert, and Saint-Lambert. Jeanne-Le Ber and LaSalle—Émard located across the Champlain Bridge.

== History ==
The riding was created in 1996 from parts of La Prairie riding.

It consisted initially of the cities of Brossard, Candiac and La Prairie, and the Parish Municipality of Saint-Philippe in the County Regional Municipality of Roussillon.

It was dissolved into the reestablished riding of La Prairie (later known as La Prairie—Atateken) and the new riding of Brossard—Saint-Lambert for the 2015 election.

=== Members of Parliament ===
This riding has elected the following members of Parliament:

Parliament	Years	Member	Party
Brossard—La Prairie; Riding created from La Prairie
36th	1997–2000	Jacques Saada	Liberal
37th	2000–2004	Jacques Saada	Liberal
38th	2004–2006	Jacques Saada	Liberal
39th	2006–2008	Marcel Lussier	Bloc Québécois
40th	2008–2011	Alexandra Mendès	Liberal
41st	2011–2015	Hoang Mai	New Democratic
Riding dissolved into La Prairie and Brossard—Saint-Lambert

== Election results ==
2011 Canadian federal election
Party	Candidate	Votes	%	±%	Expenditures
New Democratic	Hoang Mai	25,512	41.02	+28.31	
Liberal	Alexandra Mendès	16,976	27.30	-5.29	
Bloc Québécois	Marcel Lussier	10,890	17.51	-14.96	
Conservative	Maurice Brossard	7,806	12.55	-6.32	
Green	Kevin Murphy	900	1.45	-1.65	
Marxist–Leninist	Normand Chouinard	110	0.18	-0.09	
Total valid votes/expense limit		62,194	100.00		
Rejected ballots		569	0.91	-0.1	
Turnout		62,763	65.02	-0.1	
Eligible voters		96,527	–	–	

2008 Canadian federal election
Party	Candidate	Votes	%	±%	Expenditures
Liberal	Alexandra Mendès^{1}	19,103	32.59	-2.4	$36,025
Bloc Québécois	Marcel Lussier^{1}	19,034	32.47	-4.7	$57,985
Conservative	Maurice Brossard	11,062	18.87	+2.0	$65,223
New Democratic	Hoang Mai	7,452	12.71	+5.3	$5,268
Green	Sonia Ziadé	1,816	3.10	-0.2	$1,057
Marxist–Leninist	Normand Chouinard	157	0.27	+0.1	
Total valid votes/expense limit		58,624	100.00	$92,860	
Rejected ballots		563	1.0		
Turnout		59,187	65.1		
Liberal gain from Bloc Québécois		Swing	-1.1		

^{1} Alexandra Mendes of the Liberal party won the riding seat on 24 October 2008 following a judicial recount. Previously, the Returning Officer for the riding validated the vote counts as 19,202 to 19,100 in favour of Marcel Lussier of the Bloc Québécois.

2006 Canadian federal election
Party	Candidate	Votes	%	±%	Expenditures
Bloc Québécois	Marcel Lussier	21,433	37.2	-3.8	$38,970
Liberal	Jacques Saada	20,190	35.0	-10.9	$67,491
Conservative	Tenzin Khangsar	9,749	16.9	+11.0	$9,901
New Democratic	Robert Nicolas	4,301	7.5	+3.1	$1,510
Green	François Desgroseilliers	1,883	3.3	+0.7	$351
Marxist–Leninist	Normand Chouinard	110	0.2	0.0	
Total valid votes/expense limit		57,666	100.0	$84,147	

2004 Canadian federal election
Party	Candidate	Votes	%	±%	Expenditures
Liberal	Jacques Saada	24,155	45.9	-6.8	$79,076
Bloc Québécois	Marcel Lussier	21,596	41.0	+8.1	$34,591
Conservative	Robert Nicolas	3,107	5.9	-5.4	$7,661
New Democratic	Nadia Alexan	2,321	4.4	+2.7	$1,767
Green	Cécile Bissonnette	1,340	2.5	–	
Marxist–Leninist	Yves Le Seigle	109	0.2	-0.1	
Total valid votes/expense limit		52,628	100.0	$81,275	

Note: Conservative vote is compared to the total of the Canadian Alliance vote and Progressive Conservative vote in 2000 election.

2000 Canadian federal election
Party	Candidate	Votes	%	±%
Liberal	Jacques Saada	26,806	52.7	+6.1
Bloc Québécois	Nicolas Tétrault	16,758	32.9	+0.2
Alliance	Richard Bélisle	2,973	5.8	
Progressive Conservative	Sylvain St-Louis	2,783	5.5	-13.4
New Democratic	Clémence Provencher	852	1.7	0.0
Natural Law	Sylvia Larrass	528	1.0	
Marxist–Leninist	Normand Chouinard	172	0.3	
Total valid votes		50,872	100.0	

1997 Canadian federal election
Party	Candidate	Votes	%
Liberal	Jacques Saada	24,676	46.6
Bloc Québécois	Françoise Bélanger	17,342	32.8
Progressive Conservative	Kiet Ngo	9,982	18.9
New Democratic	Samantha McGavin	906	1.7
Total valid votes		52,906	100.0

== See also ==
- List of Canadian electoral districts
- Historical federal electoral districts of Canada
