= Marcel Lussier =

Canadian politician

Member of Parliament for Brossard—La Prairie
- In office January 23, 2006 – 2008
- Preceded by: Jacques Saada
- Succeeded by: Alexandra Mendès

Personal details
- Born: June 30, 1944 (age 82) Saint-Damase, Quebec, Canada
- Party: Bloc Québécois
- Profession: engineer

Marcel Lussier (born June 30, 1944) is a Canadian politician and the former Member of Parliament for the riding of Brossard—La Prairie. Lussier was born in Saint-Damase, Quebec.

Lussier was an unsuccessful candidate for the Parti Québécois in La Pinière in the 2003 Quebec election. He ran for office as a member of the Bloc Québécois in the 2004 federal election, but was defeated by Jacques Saada. In the 2006 election he ran again, defeating Saada by approximately two per cent of the vote. He served as the party's critic for Environment.

Prior to being elected, he had worked as an engineer. In 1968 he earned a Master of Science degree in health engineering from École Polytechnique, and then went on to earn a bachelor's degree in applied science for civil engineering in 1970 from Université de Sherbrooke. He worked at Hydro-Québec for 22 years as an environmental engineering specialist.

He was initially declared re-elected in the 2008 election, but a judicial recount later declared that he had been defeated by Alexandra Mendès of the Liberals. In the 2011 election he lost again, to Hoang Mai of the NDP.

In June 2022, Lussier won the 70 million dollar jackpot in the Lotto Max lottery.

== Electoral record ==
2011 Canadian federal election: Brossard—La Prairie
Party	Candidate	Votes	%	±%
New Democratic	Hoang Mai	25,512	41.02	+28.31
Liberal	Alexandra Mendès (incumbent)	16,976	27.30	−5.29
Bloc Québécois	Marcel Lussier	10,890	17.51	−14.96
Conservative	Maurice Brossard	7,806	12.55	−6.32
Green	Kevin Murphy	900	1.45	−1.65
Marxist–Leninist	Normand Chouinard	110	0.18	−0.09
Total valid votes		62,194	100.00	
Total rejected ballots		569		
Turnout		62,763		
Source: Official Results, Elections Canada.

2008 Canadian federal election: Brossard—La Prairie
Party	Candidate	Votes	%	±%	Expenditures
Liberal	Alexandra Mendès	19,103	32.59	−2.42	$36,025
Bloc Québécois	Marcel Lussier	19,034	32.47	−4.70	$55,711
Conservative	Maurice Brossard	11,062	18.87	+1.96	$66,126
New Democratic	Hoang Mai	7,452	12.71	+5.25	$5,453
Green	Sonia Ziadé	1,816	3.10	−0.17	$1,057
Marxist–Leninist	Normand Chouinard	157	0.27	+0.08	none listed
Total valid votes		58,624	100.00		
Total rejected ballots		563			
Turnout		59,187	64.57	−2.49	
Electors on the lists		91,662			
Sources: Official Results, Elections Canada and Financial Returns, Elections Canada. Italicized expenditures refer to totals submitted by the candidate and are presented when the reviewed totals are not available.

2006 Canadian federal election: Brossard—La Prairie
Party	Candidate	Votes	%	±%	Expenditures
Bloc Québécois	Marcel Lussier	21,433	37.17		$38,970
Liberal	Jacques Saada	20,190	35.01	–	$67,491
Conservative	Tenzin D. Khangsar	9,749	16.91		$9,901
New Democratic	Robert Nicolas	4,301	7.46		$1,510
Green	François Desgroseilliers	1,883	3.27	–	$351
Marxist–Leninist	Normand Chouinard	110	0.19		none listed
Total valid votes		57,666	100.00		
Total rejected ballots		545			
Turnout		58,211	67.06		
Electors on the lists		86,808			
Sources: Official Results, Elections Canada and Financial Returns, Elections Canada. Italicized expenditures refer to totals submitted by the candidate and are presented when the reviewed totals are not available.
