= Claude Bachand =

Canadian politician (1951–2026)

Member of Parliament for Saint-Jean
- In office October 25, 1993 – May 2, 2011
- Preceded by: Clément Couture
- Succeeded by: Tarik Brahmi

Personal details
- Born: January 3, 1951 Saint-Jean-sur-Richelieu, Quebec, Canada
- Died: September 14, 2026 (aged 75)
- Party: Bloc Québécois
- Profession: Educator
- Website: Official website

Claude Bachand (January 3, 1951 – September 14 2026) was a Canadian politician who represented the riding of Saint-Jean in the House of Commons of Canada from 1993 until 2011 as a member of the Bloc Québécois. Bachand was the National Defence critic for the Bloc Québécois. Before entering politics, Bachand was an educator.

== Life and career ==
Bachand was born in Saint-Jean-sur-Richelieu, Quebec on January 3, 1951. He ran for mayor of Saint-Jean-sur-Richelieu in the 2013 and 2017 municipal elections, losing both times.

Bachand died on September 14, 2026, at the age of 75.
