= Ian Watson (politician) =

Canadian politician (1934–2023)

- Official 1980 portrait

Member of the Canadian Parliament for Châteauguay—Huntingdon—Laprairie
- In office April 1963 – June 1968
- Preceded by: Jean Boucher
- Succeeded by: District abolished

Member of the Canadian Parliament for Laprairie
- In office June 1968 – May 1979
- Preceded by: District established
- Succeeded by: Pierre Deniger

Member of the Canadian Parliament for Châteauguay
- In office May 1979 – July 1984
- Preceded by: District established
- Succeeded by: Ricardo López

Personal details
- Born: April 10, 1934 Howick, Quebec, Canada
- Died: April 2, 2023 (aged 88)
- Party: Liberal
- Profession: Lawyer
- Committees: Chair, Standing Committee on National Resources and Public Works (1980-1984); Chair, Standing Committee on Indian Affairs and Northern Development (1968–1972 & 1976–1979)
- Portfolio: Parliamentary Secretary to the Minister of National Revenue (1972); Parliamentary Secretary to the Minister of State for Urban Affairs (1972–1973 & 1974)

Ian Watson (April 10, 1934 – April 2, 2023) was a Canadian politician. He served as a Liberal party MP from 1963 to 1984.

== Early life and career ==
Born in Howick, Quebec, Watson was a lawyer by trade.

== Political career ==
Watson first won office at Quebec's Châteauguay—Huntingdon—Laprairie riding in the 1963 federal election and was re-elected in 1965, 1968, 1972 and 1974. His riding was changed to La Prairie in 1968.

In the 1979 election, Watson campaigned and won in the Châteauguay riding and was re-elected there in 1980. He was defeated in the 1984 election by Ricardo Lopez of the Progressive Conservative party.

Watson served seven successive terms from the 26th to the 32nd Canadian Parliaments.

== Death ==
Watson died on April 2, 2023, at the age of 88.

== Electoral history ==
1968 Canadian federal election: La Prairie
Party	Candidate	Votes
Liberal	Ian Watson	31,968
Progressive Conservative	H.-René Laberge	5,316
New Democratic	Yves Demers	3,551
Ralliement créditiste	Marcellin Gagnon	1,288

1972 Canadian federal election: La Prairie
Party	Candidate	Votes
Liberal	Ian Watson	34,557
Progressive Conservative	Robert-F. Nelson	9,147
Social Credit	Marcellin Gagnon	7,315
New Democratic	Bernard Boulanger	5,261

1974 Canadian federal election: La Prairie
Party	Candidate	Votes
Liberal	Ian Watson	35,276
Progressive Conservative	Georges Brossard	12,767
New Democratic	Jean-Claude Bohrer	5,153
Social Credit	Aimé Coderre	3,855

1979 Canadian federal election: Châteauguay
Party	Candidate	Votes
Liberal	Ian Watson	27,485
Progressive Conservative	Yves Longtin	5,909
Social Credit	Jean Lachaine	3,668
New Democratic	Ginette Bourdon	2,404
Rhinoceros	Cher Logue Georges Duchesne	883
Union populaire	Guy Cousineau	213

1980 Canadian federal election: Châteauguay
Party	Candidate	Votes
Liberal	Ian Watson	27,152
New Democratic	William W. Evans	4,203
Progressive Conservative	Jean Dugre	3,311
Social Credit	Paul-André Boucher	1,182
Union populaire	Jean-Denis Paquette	570
Marxist–Leninist	Jane Woods	199
lop.parl.ca

1984 Canadian federal election: Châteauguay
Party	Candidate	Votes
Progressive Conservative	Ricardo López	21,318
Liberal	Ian Watson	17,313
New Democratic	Robert Vigneault	5,083
Parti nationaliste	Jean-Guy Lafrenaye	1,630
Libertarian	Guy Pelletier	284
Commonwealth of Canada	Gilles A. Grisé	124
