= Hoang Mai =

Canadian politician

Shadow Minister for National Revenue
- In office May 26, 2011 – January 16, 2013
- Leader: Jack Layton; Nycole Turmel; Thomas Mulcair
- Preceded by: Jean-Claude D'Amours
- Succeeded by: Murray Rankin

Member of Parliament for Brossard—La Prairie
- In office 2011–2015
- Preceded by: Alexandra Mendès
- Succeeded by: district abolished

Personal details
- Born: June 14, 1973 (age 53) Montreal, Quebec, Canada
- Party: New Democratic Party

Hoang Mai (born June 14, 1973) is a Canadian politician, who served as a New Democratic Party Member of Parliament for Brossard—La Prairie from 2011 to 2015.

== Early life ==
Mai studied pure science and economics before completing his bachelor's degree in law and a master's degree in international private law with a notary option from the Université de Montréal in 1996. He then trained in international law in The Hague. In 1998 he joined an international law office which took him to work in Vietnam, Singapore and Hong Kong before returning to Montreal in 2001. Since 2002, Hoang has been a notary in private practice.

Mai ran in Brossard—La Prairie in the 2008 federal election, but lost to Liberal candidate Alexandra Mendès. He was elected in the 2011 Canadian federal election, defeating Mendès. Born in Montreal to Vietnamese immigrant parents, he and caucus colleague Anne Minh-Thu Quach were the second and third people of Vietnamese descent, following Ève-Mary Thaï Thi Lac, ever elected to the House of Commons of Canada.

Shortly after the election Mai was named to the official opposition shadow cabinet as critic for National Revenue. He was also the first Vice-Chair of the Standing Committee on Finance (FINA) in the House of Commons. In January 2013, he was named Deputy Critic for Justice and began to sit on the Justice and Human rights committee. In March 2014, he was named the Official Opposition Transport critic, replacing Olivia Chow, who resigned and campaigned to become Mayor of Toronto.

He was member of the Canada-Vietnam and Canada-China parliamentary associations.

In the 2015 federal election, Mai ran for re-election in the newly created riding of Brossard—Saint-Lambert, again facing off against Mendès, who defeated him.

== Electoral record ==
2015 Canadian federal election: Brossard—Saint-Lambert
Party	Candidate	Votes	%	±%	Expenditures
Liberal	Alexandra Mendès	28,818	50.3	+17.55	–
New Democratic	Hoang Mai	14,075	24.6	-12.21	–
Conservative	Qais Hamidi	7,215	12.6	-0.22	–
Bloc Québécois	Suzanne Lachance	6,071	10.6	-5.35	–
Green	Fang Hu	1,089	1.9	+0.39	–
Total valid votes/Expense limit		57,260	100.0		$220,572.15
Total rejected ballots		549	0.94	–	
Turnout		57,809	69.16	–	
Eligible voters		83,194			
Source: Elections Canada

2011 Canadian federal election: Brossard—La Prairie
Party	Candidate	Votes	%	±%
New Democratic	Hoang Mai	25,512	41.02	+28.31
Liberal	Alexandra Mendès (incumbent)	16,976	27.30	−5.29
Bloc Québécois	Marcel Lussier	10,890	17.51	−14.96
Conservative	Maurice Brossard	7,806	12.55	−6.32
Green	Kevin Murphy	900	1.45	−1.65
Marxist–Leninist	Normand Chouinard	110	0.18	−0.09
Total valid votes		62,194	100.00	
Total rejected ballots		569		
Turnout		62,763		
Source: Official Results, Elections Canada.

2008 Canadian federal election: Brossard—La Prairie
Party	Candidate	Votes	%	±%	Expenditures
Liberal	Alexandra Mendès	19,103	32.59	−2.42	$36,025
Bloc Québécois	Marcel Lussier	19,034	32.47	−4.70	$55,711
Conservative	Maurice Brossard	11,062	18.87	+1.96	$66,126
New Democratic	Hoang Mai	7,452	12.71	+5.25	$5,453
Green	Sonia Ziadé	1,816	3.10	−0.17	$1,057
Marxist–Leninist	Normand Chouinard	157	0.27	+0.08	none listed
Total valid votes		58,624	100.00		
Total rejected ballots		563			
Turnout		59,187	64.57	−2.49	
Electors on the lists		91,662			
Sources: Official Results, Elections Canada and Financial Returns, Elections Canada. Italicized expenditures refer to totals submitted by the candidate and are presented when the reviewed totals are not available.
