= Ricardo López (politician) =

Canadian politician (1937–2024)

Ricardo López Bello (February 13, 1937 – January 27, 2024) was a Canadian politician who was a member of the House of Commons of Canada, 1984-1993. He was a businessman by trade.

López was born in Cabrui, A Coruña, Galicia, Spain and represented the Quebec riding of Châteauguay. He was first elected in the 1984 federal election and re-elected in 1988, therefore becoming a member in the 33rd and 34th Canadian Parliaments. He was a member of the Progressive Conservative (PC) Party. He did not serve in the cabinet under PC prime ministers Brian Mulroney or Kim Campbell. His main claim to fame in the House of Commons was that when he rose to address the assembly, both English and French interpreters would immediately start to try to decipher his speech due to his thick accent.

He played a role in inflaming opinions during the Oka crisis.

López left federal politics after he lost his seat in 1993 to Maurice Godin of the Bloc Québécois. He was also defeated at the same riding in the 2000 federal election, this time a candidate for the Canadian Alliance.

López died on January 27, 2024, at the age of 86.

== Electoral history ==
1984 Canadian federal election: Châteauguay
Party	Candidate	Votes
Progressive Conservative	Ricardo López	21,318
Liberal	Ian Watson	17,313
New Democratic	Robert Vigneault	5,083
Parti nationaliste	Jean-Guy Lafrenaye	1,630
Libertarian	Guy Pelletier	284
Commonwealth of Canada	Gilles A. Grisé	124

1988 Canadian federal election: Châteauguay
Party	Candidate	Votes
Progressive Conservative	Ricardo López	22,439
Liberal	Jean-Marc Fournier	16,422
New Democratic	Pierre Hétu	8,282
Not affiliated	André Turcot	1,724
Rhinoceros	Hubert Le Tube Simon	1,250

1993 Canadian federal election: Châteauguay
Party	Candidate	Votes
Bloc Québécois	Maurice Godin	34,271
Liberal	Kimon Valaskakis	18,012
Progressive Conservative	Ricardo López	5,749
New Democratic	Luc Proulx	850
Commonwealth of Canada	Stéphane Beauregard	317

2000 Canadian federal election: Châteauguay
Party	Candidate	Votes
Bloc Québécois	Robert Lanctôt	26,284
Liberal	Carole Marcil	22,972
Alliance	Ricardo López	3,120
Progressive Conservative	Réjeanne Rioux	2,041
Natural Law	Margaret Larrass	743
New Democratic	Robert Lindblad	622
