= Jacques Saada =

Canadian politician

The Honourable Jacques Saada PC

Member of Parliament for Brossard—La Prairie
- In office 2 June 1997 – 23 January 2006
- Preceded by: first member
- Succeeded by: Marcel Lussier

Personal details
- Born: November 22, 1947 (age 78) Tunis, Tunisia
- Party: Liberal
- Profession: Teacher, businessman

Jacques Saada, PC (Arabic: جاك سعادة; born 22 November 1947) is a Canadian politician and former cabinet minister.

Saada is a teacher and linguist by profession and was chief executive officer of a translation firm, a consultant and a lecturer in translation prior to entering politics.

He was first elected to the House of Commons of Canada as a Liberal Member of Parliament (MP) from the Quebec riding of Brossard—La Prairie in the 1997 federal election. He served as Deputy Government Whip from 2001 to 2003. When Paul Martin became Prime Minister of Canada on 12 December 2003, he had Saada appointed as a privy councillor (giving him the prenominal "The Honourable" and the postnominal "PC" for life) and to the Cabinet as Minister Responsible for Democratic Reform and Government House Leader.

Following the 2004 election with the election of a Liberal minority government, Saada was transferred to the positions of Minister for the Economic Development Agency of Canada for the Regions of Quebec and Minister responsible for La Francophonie.

Saada was born in Tunis, the main city of Tunisia, to a Jewish family. In the 2004 election his campaign was the target of antisemitic graffiti, letters, and phone calls.

Saada was defeated in the 2006 election, losing his seat in Brossard—La Prairie to Bloc Québécois candidate Marcel Lussier. His former constituency assistant, Alexandra Mendès, defeated Lussier in the 2008 election.

He was the Quebec Chair for the Rae campaign for the leadership of the Liberal Party. In September 2007, Saada was named president and chief executive officer of the Quebec Aerospace Association (AQA). He resigned from that position in December 2011.

== Electoral record (partial) ==
2000 Canadian federal election: Brossard—La Prairie
Party	Candidate	Votes	%	±%	Expenditures
Liberal	Jacques Saada	26,806	52.69	–	$63,331
Bloc Québécois	Nicolas Tétrault	16,758	32.94		$66,058
Alliance	Richard Bélisle	2,973	5.84		$8,956
Progressive Conservative	Sylvain St-Louis	2,783	5.47		$50
New Democratic	Clémence Provencher	852	1.67		none listed
Natural Law	Sylvia Larrass	528	1.04		none listed
Marxist–Leninist	Normand Chouinard	172	0.34		$10
Total valid votes/expenditures limit		50,872	100.00		$69,269
Total rejected ballots		1,067			
Turnout		51,939	66.13		
Electors on the lists		78,535			
Sources: Official Results, Elections Canada and Financial Returns, Elections Canada.

27th Canadian Ministry (2003–2006) – Cabinet of Paul Martin
Cabinet posts (3)
Predecessor	Office	Successor
legislation enacted	Minister of the Economic Development Agency of Canada for the Regions of Quebec; 2005–2006	Jean-Pierre Blackburn
	Minister of State; 2004–2005 styled as Minister of the Economic Development Agency of Canada for the Regions of Quebec	legislation enacted
	Minister of State; 2003–2004 styled as Leader of the Government in the House of Commons	
Special Cabinet Responsibilities
Predecessor	Title	Successor
Denis Coderre	Minister responsible for La Francophonie; 2004–2006	Josée Verner
position created	Minister responsible for Democratic Reform; 2003–2004	Mauril Bélanger
Special Parliamentary Responsibilities
Predecessor	Title	Successor
Don Boudria	Leader of the Government in the House of Commons; 2003–2004	Tony Valeri
