= Tarik Brahmi =

Canadian engineer and politician

Member of Parliament for Saint-Jean
- In office May 2, 2011 – August 4, 2015
- Preceded by: Claude Bachand
- Succeeded by: Jean Rioux

Personal details
- Born: May 19, 1968 (age 58) Lyon, France
- Party: New Democratic Party
- Profession: Engineer, consultant, politician

Tarik Brahmi (born May 19, 1968) is a Canadian engineer and politician. He was the Member of Parliament for the riding of Saint-Jean from 2011, when he defeated incumbent Claude Bachand of the Bloc Québécois, until 2015, and sat with New Democratic Party caucus.

Born in Lyon, France, with a father from Toudja, Algeria, he graduated from the Université de Montpellier in 1991 with a degree in Microelectronics and Control Engineering. He became interested in environmental causes in 1995, and worked in software development. He immigrated to Canada in 2002 and became a Canadian citizen in 2006. He was a candidate for the municipal council of Saint-Jean-sur-Richelieu in 2009.

Prior to being elected to parliament, he worked as a senior interviewer for Statistics Canada. Brahmi did not stand in the 2015 federal election.

== Electoral record ==
2011 Canadian federal election
Party	Candidate	Votes	%	±%	Expenditures
New Democratic	Tarik Brahmi	24,899	47.4%	-	
Bloc Québécois	Claude Bachand	16,023	30.5%	-	
Conservative	Jean Thouin	5,601	10.7%	-	
Liberal	Robert David	4,643	8.8%	-	
Green	Pierre Tremblay	1,322	2.5%	-	
Total valid votes/Expense limit		52,488	100.0%		

Source: Elections Canada
