= Brossard—Saint-Lambert =

Federal electoral district in Quebec, Canada

Quebec electoral district
- Interactive map of riding boundaries from the 2015 federal election

Federal electoral district
- Legislature: House of Commons
MP
Alexandra Mendès
Liberal
- District created: 2013
- First contested: 2015
- Last contested: 2021
- District webpage: profile, map

Demographics
- Population (2016): 107,582
- Electors (2019): 83,447
- Area (km²): 52.82
- Pop. density (per km²): 2,036.8
- Census division(s): Longueuil
- Census subdivision(s): Brossard, Saint-Lambert

Brossard—Saint-Lambert (French pronunciation: [bʁɔsaʁ sɛ̃ lɑ̃bɛʁ]) is a federal electoral district in Quebec, Canada, that has been represented in the House of Commons of Canada since 2015.

Brossard—Saint-Lambert was created by the 2012 federal electoral boundaries redistribution from parts of Brossard—La Prairie and Saint-Lambert. It was legally defined in the 2013 representation order, and came into effect upon the call of the 2025 Canadian federal election.

== Profile ==
Brossard—Saint-Lambert is a fairly diverse riding, especially for Montreal's South Shore. The riding has one of the strongest Chinese communities in Quebec, concentrated in Brossard. In addition to this, Brossard—Saint-Lambert has one of the stronger Anglophone communities on the South Shore of Montreal. This riding, and its predecessor, has traditionally been a Liberal bastion of support and they reclaimed it from the NDP following the 2015 federal election.

The Liberals are slightly stronger in Brossard than in Saint-Lambert, while the opposite is true for the Bloc Québécois. Due to their recent large margins of victory in the past three elections (2015, 2019, 2021), this difference in support levels is not particularly apparent, as the Liberals have carried all or almost all polls in the riding.

== Demographics ==
According to the 2021 Canadian census, 2023 representation order

Racial groups: 56.4% White, 13.3% Chinese, 6.4% Arab, 5.7% Black, 4.7% Latin American, 4.1% South Asian, 3.0% West Asian, 2.4% Southeast Asian
Languages: 50.3% French, 16.3% English, 5.9% Mandarin, 5.2% Spanish, 4.6% Arabic, 4.3% Cantonese, 1.5% Dari, 1.4% Vietnamese, 1.2% Romanian, 1.0% Persian, 1.0% Portuguese
Religions: 52.0% Christian (37.9% Catholic, 4.1% Christian Orthodox, 10.0% Other), 12.5% Muslim, 2.2% Buddhist, 1.3% Hindu, 31.0% None
Median income: $42,000 (2020)
Average income: $60,200 (2020)

== Member of Parliament ==
This riding has elected the following members of Parliament:

Parliament	Years	Member	Party
Brossard—Saint-Lambert; Riding created from Brossard—La Prairie and Saint-Lambert
42nd	2015–2019	Alexandra Mendès	Liberal
43rd	2019–2021	Alexandra Mendès	Liberal
44th	2021–2025	Alexandra Mendès	Liberal
45th	2025–present	Alexandra Mendès	Liberal

== Election results ==
2025 Canadian federal election
Party	Candidate	Votes	%	±%
Liberal	Alexandra Mendès	36,541	62.21	+8.11
Conservative	William Huynh-Jan	11,076	18.86	+6.87
Bloc Québécois	Soledad Orihuela-Bouchard	7,837	13.34	-6.60
New Democratic	Zeinab Mistou Akkaoui	2,049	3.49	-6.91
Green	Gregory De Luca	855	1.46	N/A
People's	Hector Huerta	381	0.65	-1.81
Total valid votes/expense limit		58,739	98.94	
Total rejected ballots		632	1.06	-0.34
Turnout		59,371	68.33	+4.45
Eligible voters		86,890		
Liberal hold		Swing		+0.62
Source: Elections Canada
Note: number of eligible voters does not include voting day registrations.

2021 Canadian federal election
Party	Candidate	Votes	%	±%	Expenditures
Liberal	Alexandra Mendès	28,326	54.10	+0.2	$43,143.97
Bloc Québécois	Marie-Laurence Desgagné	10,441	19.94	+0.3	$2,261.56
Conservative	Marcos Alves	6,276	11.99	+1.2	$5,119.08
New Democratic	Marc Audet	5,442	10.39	+0.9	$1,969.07
People's	Brenda Ross	1,288	2.46	+1.6	$2,754.06
Free	Engineer-Ingénieur Hu	583	1.11	N/A	$84.25
Total valid votes/expense limit		52,356	98.60	–	$113,037.00
Total rejected ballots		744	1.40		
Turnout		53,100	63.88		
Registered voters		83,125			
Liberal hold		Swing		-0.1	
Source: Elections Canada

2019 Canadian federal election
Party	Candidate	Votes	%	±%	Expenditures
Liberal	Alexandra Mendès	30,537	53.9	+3.6	$51,952.14
Bloc Québécois	Marie-Claude Diotte	11,131	19.6	+9	none listed
Conservative	Glenn Hoa	6,112	10.8	-1.6	$13,207.97
New Democratic	Marc Audet	5,410	9.5	-15.1	$4,953.35
Green	Grégory De Luca	2,935	5.2	+3.3	$4,793.32
People's	Sam Nassif	527	0.9		none listed
Total valid votes/expense limit		56,652	100.0		
Total rejected ballots		657			
Turnout		57,309	68.7		
Eligible voters		83,447			
Liberal hold		Swing		-2.70	
Source: Elections Canada

2015 Canadian federal election
Party	Candidate	Votes	%	±%	Expenditures
Liberal	Alexandra Mendès	28,818	50.33	+17.58	–
New Democratic	Hoang Mai	14,075	24.58	-12.23	–
Conservative	Qais Hamidi	7,215	12.6	-0.22	–
Bloc Québécois	Suzanne Lachance	6,071	10.6	-5.35	–
Green	Fang Hu	1,081	1.9	+0.39	–
Total valid votes/Expense limit		57,260	100.0		$220,572.15
Total rejected ballots		549	0.94	–	
Turnout		57,809	69.01	–	
Eligible voters		83,766			
Source: Elections Canada

2011 federal election redistributed results
Party	Vote	%
New Democratic	18,031	36.81
Liberal	16,045	32.75
Bloc Québécois	7,812	15.95
Conservative	6,282	12.82
Green	740	1.51
Others	76	0.16

== See also ==
- List of Canadian electoral districts
- Historical federal electoral districts of Canada
