= Walter Bernard Smith =

Canadian politician

Member of Parliament for Saint-Jean
- In office June 1968 – March 1979

Personal details
- Born: 26 March 1912 Hemmingford, Quebec, Canada
- Died: 3 October 1987 (aged 75)
- Party: Liberal
- Profession: customs officer, merchant

Walter Bernard Smith (26 March 1912 – 3 October 1987) was a Liberal party member of the House of Commons of Canada. He was born in Hemmingford, Quebec and became a customs officer and merchant by career.

He was first elected at the Saint-Jean riding in the 1968 general election. Smith was re-elected in the 1972 and 1974 federal elections, then left federal politics after completing his term in the 30th Parliament.
