= Clément Couture =

Canadian politician (1939–2021)

Clément Couture (2 August 1939 – 8 July 2021) was a Canadian politician who was a member of the House of Commons from 1988 to 1993. By career, he was an industrial commissioner and administrator.

== Biography ==
Clément Couture was born in Saint-Camille, Quebec, Canada, on 2 August 1939.

Couture was elected in the 1988 federal election at the Saint-Jean electoral district for the Progressive Conservative Party. He served in the 34th Canadian Parliament after which he was defeated by Claude Bachand of the Bloc Québécois in the 1993 federal election.

Couture died on 8 July 2021, at the age of 81.
