= Thomas Kennedy Ramsay =

Thomas Kennedy Ramsay (2 September 1826-22 December 1886) was a Scots-Canadian jurist and judge.

== Life ==
He was born in Ayr as the third son of David Ramsay of Grimmat, Straiton, writer to the signet, whilst his mother (d.1878) was a daughter of Thomas Kennedy of Kirkmechan House, Ayr and sister to the wife of the army officer James Shaw. His father died when he was young and he was initially privately tutored at St John's, Maryhill, where his mother had moved, then at a school in St Andrews and Ayr Academy as well as in France.

His mother took the family to St Hugues in Canada in 1847 and Thomas was called to the bar in 1852 as well as helping manage La Patrie and the Evening Telegraph, helping found the Lower Canada Jurist and editing the Law Reporter. He also ran unsuccessfully twice for the House of Commons of Canada.

From 1859 to 1862 he was secretary of the commission for the codification of the civil law of Lower Canada, publishing an Index to Reported Cases in 1865 just before being appointed crown prosecutor at Montreal, including prosecution of the Fenian raiders at Sweetsburg. He was made a Queen's Counsel in 1867, three years later an assistant justice of the superior court and in 1873 a puisne judge of the court of queen's bench for the Dominion. Upon his death he was buried at the Mount Royal Cemetery, Montreal.
