= Saint-Jean (federal electoral district) =

Federal electoral district in Quebec, Canada

Coordinates: 45.24°N 73.24°W

Quebec electoral district
- Interactive map of riding boundaries from the 1997 federal election

Federal electoral district
- Legislature: House of Commons
MP
Christine Normandin
Bloc Québécois
- District created: 1966
- First contested: 1968
- Last contested: 2021
- District webpage: profile, map

Demographics
- Population (2011): 108,244
- Electors (2015): 88,081
- Area (km²): 734
- Pop. density (per km²): 147.5
- Census subdivision(s): Saint-Jean-sur-Richelieu, Mont-Saint-Grégoire, Lacolle, Saint-Alexandre, Sainte-Anne-de-Sabrevois, Saint-Paul-de-l'Île-aux-Noix, Saint-Blaise-sur-Richelieu, Sainte-Brigide-d'Iberville, Saint-Valentin

Saint-Jean (French pronunciation: [sɛ̃ ʒɑ̃]) is a federal electoral district in Quebec, Canada, that has been represented in the House of Commons of Canada since 1968.

== Demographics ==
According to the 2021 Canadian census, 2023 representation order

Racial groups: 94.7% White, 1.5% Indigenous, 1.2% Black
Languages: 94.4% French, 4.1% English
Religions: 69.2% Christian (62.4% Catholic, 6.8% Other), 1.2% Muslim, 29.1% None
Median income: $42,400 (2020)
Average income: $49,680 (2020)

== Geography ==
The riding extends along the Richelieu River southeast of Montreal, in the Quebec region of Montérégie. It consists of the northern and western parts of the RCM of Le Haut-Richelieu.

The neighbouring ridings are Beauharnois—Salaberry, Brossard—La Prairie, Chambly—Borduas, Shefford, and Brome—Missisquoi.

Its population is 102,902, with 85,659 registered electors, and has an area of 734 km^{2}.

== Profile ==
Long a Bloc stronghold, the riding of Saint-Jean turned orange as the NDP swept the province of Quebec in 2011. BQ support was generally spread evenly throughout the riding, like the victorious NDP. The Liberals did slightly better in and around Lacolle than in other portions of the seat but had weak support in all parts of the riding. The Conservatives did have some pockets of good support, but they were largely isolated. Their support was largely uniform, although they did slightly better in the rural areas.

== History ==
It was created in 1966 from parts of Beauharnois—Salaberry, Châteauguay—Huntingdon—Laprairie and Saint-Jean—Iberville—Napierville ridings.

This riding was not changed during the 2012 electoral redistribution.

== Members of Parliament ==
Parliament	Years	Member	Party
Saint-Jean; Riding created from Beauharnois—Salaberry, Châteauguay—Huntingdon—Laprairie and Saint-Jean—Iberville—Napierville
28th	1968–1972	Walter Bernard Smith	Liberal
29th	1972–1974	Walter Bernard Smith	Liberal
30th	1974–1979	Walter Bernard Smith	Liberal
31st	1979–1980	Paul-André Massé	Liberal
32nd	1980–1984	Paul-André Massé	Liberal
33rd	1984–1988	André Bissonnette	Progressive Conservative
34th	1988–1993	Clément Couture	Progressive Conservative
35th	1993–1997	Claude Bachand	Bloc Québécois
36th	1997–2000	Claude Bachand	Bloc Québécois
37th	2000–2004	Claude Bachand	Bloc Québécois
38th	2004–2006	Claude Bachand	Bloc Québécois
39th	2006–2008	Claude Bachand	Bloc Québécois
40th	2008–2011	Claude Bachand	Bloc Québécois
41st	2011–2015	Tarik Brahmi	New Democratic
42nd	2015–2019	Jean Rioux	Liberal
43rd	2019–2021	Christine Normandin	Bloc Québécois
44th	2021–2025	Christine Normandin	Bloc Québécois
45th	2025–present	Christine Normandin	Bloc Québécois

== Election results ==
2025 Canadian federal election
Party	Candidate	Votes	%	±%
Bloc Québécois	Christine Normandin	28,474	44.34	−1.67
Liberal	Patrick Agbokou	21,999	34.26	+6.14
Conservative	Marie Louis-Seize	10,480	16.32	+3.58
New Democratic	Danielle Dubuc	1,650	2.57	−4.71
Green	Vincent Piette	988	1.54	−0.59
People's	Tchad Deschenes	624	0.97	N/A
Total valid votes		64,215	98.27	
Total rejected ballots		1,133	1.73	-0.78
Turnout		65,348	69.76	
Eligible voters		93,678		
Bloc Québécois hold		Swing		−3.90
Source: Elections Canada

2021 Canadian federal election
Party	Candidate	Votes	%	±%	Expenditures
Bloc Québécois	Christine Normandin	27,243	46.01	+1.16	$24,135.60
Liberal	Jean Rioux	16,650	28.12	-2.44	$25,867.78
Conservative	Serge Benoit	7,544	12.74	+2.05	$8,881.79
New Democratic	Jeremy Fournier	4,308	7.28	-0.47	$1,799.40
Free	Jean-Charles Cléroux	1,790	3.02	–	$574.88
Green	Leigh V. Ryan	1,262	2.13	-2.92	none listed
Indépendance du Québec	Pierre Duteau	413	0.70	+0.23	$0.00
Total valid votes/expense limit		59,210	–	–	$120,327.62
Total rejected ballots					
Turnout					
Eligible voters		91,951			
Bloc Québécois hold		Swing		+1.80	
Source: Elections Canada

2019 Canadian federal election: Saint-Jean
Party	Candidate	Votes	%	±%	Expenditures
Bloc Québécois	Christine Normandin	27,750	44.8	+19.99	$14,561.23
Liberal	Jean Rioux	18,906	30.6	-2.56	$111,054.31
Conservative	Martin Thibert	6,612	10.7	-0.15	$12,932.62
New Democratic	Chantal Reeves	4,794	7.7	-21.37	$0.10
Green	André-Philippe Chenail	3,127	5.1	+2.98	$2,436.80
People's	Marc Hivon	397	0.6	–	none listed
Indépendance du Québec	Yvon Savary	289	0.5	–	$137.94
Total valid votes/expense limit		61,875	100.0		
Total rejected ballots		1,241			
Turnout		63,116			
Eligible voters		91,035			
Population		111,190			
Bloc Québécois gain from Liberal		Swing		+11.28	
Source: Elections Canada

2015 Canadian federal election
Party	Candidate	Votes	%	±%	Expenditures
Liberal	Jean Rioux	20,022	33.16	+24.32	–
New Democratic	Hans Marotte	17,555	29.07	-18.40	–
Bloc Québécois	Denis Hurtubise	14,979	24.81	-5.69	–
Conservative	Stéphane Guinta	6,549	10.85	+0.18	–
Green	Marilyn Redivo	1,281	2.12	-0.40	–
Total valid votes/expense limit		60,386	100.00		$228,390.29
Total rejected ballots		1,231	2.00	–	
Turnout		61,617	69.69	–	
Eligible voters		88,414			
Liberal gain from New Democratic		Swing		+21.36	
Source: Elections Canada

2011 Canadian federal election
Party	Candidate	Votes	%	±%	Expenditures
New Democratic	Tarik Brahmi	24,943	47.5	+37.2	
Bloc Québécois	Claude Bachand	16,023	30.5	-19.1	
Conservative	Jean Thouin	5,603	10.7	-6.7	
Liberal	Robert David	4,644	8.8	-8.9	
Green	Pierre Tremblay	1,326	2.5	-1.5	
Total valid votes/expense limit		52,539	100.0		
Total rejected ballots		862	1.6	+0.1	
Turnout		53,401	62.3	-5.6	
Eligible voters		85,659	–	–	

2008 Canadian federal election
Party	Candidate	Votes	%	±%	Expenditures
Bloc Québécois	Claude Bachand	26,506	49.6	-4.4	$75,270
Liberal	Claire Ste-Marie	9,430	17.7	+5.3	$18,708
Conservative	Marie-Josée Mercier	9,281	17.4	-4.7	$86,608
New Democratic	Philippe Refghi	5,529	10.3	+3.3	$1,813
Green	Pierre Tremblay	2,160	4.0	-0.6	$872
Independent	Guy Berger	520	1.0		
Total valid votes/expense limit		53,426	100.0	$87,185	
Total rejected ballots		830	1.5		
Turnout		54,256	67.9		

2006 Canadian federal election
Party	Candidate	Votes	%	±%	Expenditures
Bloc Québécois	Claude Bachand	28,070	54.0	-6.1	$71,327
Conservative	Francis Lévesque	11,516	22.1	+14.3	$6,476
Liberal	Maro Akoury	6,426	12.4	-13.6	$27,591
New Democratic	Mathieu-Gilles Lanciault	3,622	7.0	+3.5	$2,283
Green	Véronique Bisaillon	2,371	4.6	+1.9	$311
Total valid votes/expense limit		52,005	100.0	$80,251	

2004 Canadian federal election
Party	Candidate	Votes	%	±%	Expenditures
Bloc Québécois	Claude Bachand	29,485	60.1	+12.3	$74,555
Liberal	Michel Fecteau	12,729	25.9	-10.4	$73,815
Conservative	Joseph Khoury	3,856	7.9	-4.6	$29,196
New Democratic	Jonathan Trépanier	1,687	3.4	+2.0	$86
Green	Claude Genest	1,298	2.6	–	
Total valid votes/expense limit		49,055	100.0	$77,882	

Note: Conservative vote is compared to the total of the Canadian Alliance vote and Progressive Conservative vote in 2000 election.

2000 Canadian federal election
Party	Candidate	Votes	%	±%
Bloc Québécois	Claude Bachand	22,686	47.8	+1.7
Liberal	Joseph Khoury	17,262	36.4	+9.2
Alliance	Josée Coulombe	3,169	6.7	
Progressive Conservative	Gérald L'Ecuyer	2,764	5.8	-18.7
Marijuana	Marc St-Jean	872	1.8	
New Democratic	Julien Patenaude	698	1.5	-0.1
Total valid votes		47,451	100.0	

1997 Canadian federal election
Party	Candidate	Votes	%	±%
Bloc Québécois	Claude Bachand	22,441	46.1	-9.8
Liberal	Diane MacDonald	13,239	27.2	+0.4
Progressive Conservative	Gérald L'Ecuyer	11,938	24.5	+9.9
New Democratic	Julien Patenaude	755	1.5	+0.6
Marxist–Leninist	André Davignon	347	0.7	
Total valid votes		48,720	100.0	

1993 Canadian federal election
Party	Candidate	Votes	%	±%
Bloc Québécois	Claude Bachand	29,753	55.9	
Liberal	Delbert Deschambault	14,244	26.7	-3.0
Progressive Conservative	Clément Couture	7,795	14.6	-41.6
Natural Law	Alain Longpré	872	1.6	
New Democratic	Jutta Teigeler	504	0.9	-10.8
Commonwealth of Canada	Guy David	105	0.2	
Total valid votes		53,273	100.0	

1988 Canadian federal election
Party	Candidate	Votes	%	±%
Progressive Conservative	Clément Couture	27,685	56.3	-3.5
Liberal	Gilles Dolbec	14,643	29.8	+1.0
New Democratic	Rezeq Faraj	5,786	11.8	+4.7
Rhinoceros	Sylvio Dubois	1,084	2.2	-0.1
Total valid votes		49,198	100.0	

1984 Canadian federal election
Party	Candidate	Votes	%	±%
Progressive Conservative	André Bissonnette	30,769	59.8	+49.2
Liberal	Paul-André Massé	14,823	28.8	-43.3
New Democratic	Todd Sloan	3,642	7.1	-5.4
Rhinoceros	Gaëtan dit Paco Pelletier	1,209	2.3	0.0
Parti nationaliste	Luc Choinière	1,002	1.9	
Commonwealth of Canada	Pierre Talbot	45	0.1	
Total valid votes		51,490	100.0	

1980 Canadian federal election
Party	Candidate	Votes	%	±%
Liberal	Paul-André Massé	30,134	72.1	+7.6
New Democratic	Roger Roy	5,194	12.4	+7.4
Progressive Conservative	Jean-Maurice Bergeron	4,410	10.6	+1.4
Rhinoceros	Jean-Luc Arène	982	2.4	+0.8
Social Credit	Marcel Coté	929	2.2	-16.5
Marxist–Leninist	Monique Davignon	136	0.3	-0.1
Total valid votes		41,785	100.0	

1979 Canadian federal election
Party	Candidate	Votes	%	±%
Liberal	Paul-André Massé	28,496	64.5	+11.2
Social Credit	Jean-Paul Lasnier	8,275	18.7	+10.2
Progressive Conservative	Paul Desrochers	4,050	9.2	-18.3
New Democratic	Todd Sloan	2,204	5.0	-1.4
Rhinoceros	John Philipp McMillan II	666	1.5	
Bloc Québécois	Lionel C. Laporte	310	0.7	
Marxist–Leninist	Monique Davignon	179	0.4	-0.3
Total valid votes		44,180	100.0	

1974 Canadian federal election
Party	Candidate	Votes	%	±%
Liberal	Walter Smith	18,798	53.3	9.4
Progressive Conservative	J.-C.-Raymond Grenier	9,689	27.5	+4.9
Social Credit	Claude Coté	3,014	8.6	-16.3
New Democratic	Fernand Houde	2,234	6.3	+0.6
Independent	André Avery	1,116	3.2	
Marxist–Leninist	André Davignon	250	0.7	
Independent	Louis Poirier	137	0.4	
Total valid votes		35,238	100.0	

1972 Canadian federal election
Party	Candidate	Votes	%	±%
Liberal	Walter Smith	16,459	43.9	-8.1
Social Credit	André Avery	9,304	24.8	+20.3
Progressive Conservative	Lucien Roy	8,462	22.6	-9.3
New Democratic	Jean-Marc Lebeau	2,165	5.8	-5.1
Independent	Maurice Gibeau	600	1.6	
Independent	Denis Lauzon	347	0.9	
Independent	Gilles Davignon	137	0.4	
Total valid votes		37,474	100.0	

Note: Social Credit vote is compared to Ralliement créditiste vote in the 1968 election.

1968 Canadian federal election
Party	Candidate	Votes	%
Liberal	Walter Smith	15,878	52.0
Progressive Conservative	Paul Beaulieu	9,715	31.8
New Democratic	Gérard Docquier	3,332	10.9
Ralliement créditiste	Louis Poirier	1,373	4.5
Démocratisation Économique	Jean Meloche	214	0.7
Total valid votes		30,512	100.0

== See also ==
- List of Canadian electoral districts
- Historical federal electoral districts of Canada
