= Maurice Godin (politician) =

Canadian politician (1932–2024)

Maurice Godin (21 October 1932 – 14 June 2024) was a Canadian politician who was a member of the House of Commons of Canada from 1993 to 2000. He was a manager by career.

== Life and career ==
Godin was born in Montreal, Quebec on 21 October 1932. He was elected in the Châteauguay electoral district under the Bloc Québécois party in the 1993 and 1997 federal elections, thus serving in the 35th and 36th Canadian Parliaments. Godin did not seek a third term in Parliament and left Canadian politics in 2000. Godin died on 14 June 2024, at the age of 91.

== Electoral record ==
1993 Canadian federal election: Châteauguay
Party	Candidate	Votes
Bloc Québécois	Maurice Godin	34,271
Liberal	Kimon Valaskakis	18,012
Progressive Conservative	Ricardo López	5,749
New Democratic	Luc Proulx	850
Commonwealth of Canada	Stéphane Beauregard	317

1997 Canadian federal election: Châteauguay
Party	Candidate	Votes
Bloc Québécois	Maurice Godin	25,909
Liberal	Sergio Pavone	19,167
Progressive Conservative	George F. Lavoie	11,112
New Democratic	Hannah Rogers	794
