= André Bissonnette =

Canadian politician

André Bissonnette, PC (born June 25, 1945) is a Canadian businessman and former politician.

Born in Saint-Jean-sur-Richelieu, Quebec, Bissonnette, a businessman in the manufacturing industry, was elected to the House of Commons of Canada in the 1984 election as the Member of Parliament for Saint-Jean, Quebec, in the Progressive Conservative landslide that brought Brian Mulroney to power.

He was appointed by the new prime minister to the Cabinet as Minister of State for Small Business (1984–1986), and Minister of State for Transport (1986–1987).

He was forced to resign from Cabinet on January 19, 1987, when it became known that the Royal Canadian Mounted Police was investigating his alleged involvement in land speculation in his riding. The real estate in question was eventually sold to weapons manufacturer Oerlikon Aerospace to build its facilities in Saint-Jean-sur-Richelieu. Bissonnette was formally accused of wrongdoing but eventually acquitted by a local jury.

He did not run for re-election in the 1988 election and left politics.
