= Progressive Conservative Party of Canada candidates in the 2000 Canadian federal election =

Twelve candidates of the Progressive Conservative Party of Canada were elected in the 2000 federal election, making the party the fifth-largest in the House of Commons of Canada. Many of the party's candidates have their own biography pages; information about others may be found here.

== Quebec (incomplete) ==
Riding	Candidate's Name	Notes	Gender	Residence	Occupation	Votes	%	Rank
Bas-Richelieu—Nicolet—Bécancour	Gabriel Rousseau		M		Student	1,944	4.38	4th
Terrebonne—Blainville	Mélanie Gemme		F		Student	3,089	5.54	4th

== Ontario ==
=== Daniel Clark (Timmins-James Bay) ===
Daniel Clark is a Canadian politician and actor who has pursued a successful career in pharmaceuticals, working for both Pharmacia and Hoffmann-La Roche. He is currently upgrading his education at Dalhousie and is a member of the university's Board of Governors. Clark was not from Timmins and never set foot in the riding before one week into the election. He finished a distant fourth. Clark has been an active volunteer in politics and his community since the age of 12. His extensive election campaign work includes tour scheduling for Dr. John Hamm's campaign for the 1999 Nova Scotia election, which resulted in Dr. Hamm becoming Premier.

=== Louise Sankey (Eglinton—Lawrence) ===
A telecommunications expert, Sankey was forty-four years old at the time of the election. She campaigned on increasing health and defence spending, eliminating the capital gains tax and toughening the Young Offenders Act. She is disabled, and used a battery-run scooter to canvass the riding. She received 7,156 votes (17.26%), finishing second against Liberal incumbent Joseph Volpe. Sankey later became active with the Conservative Party, served as fundraising director for the Eglinton—Lawrence riding. In 2005, she spoke against adopting a policy to restrict abortion rights.

=== Bryan Brulotte (Lanark—Carleton) ===
Brulotte (born in Kingston, Ontario) was an officer in the Canadian military, serving as a peacekeeper and an aide-de-camp for Governor General Ray Hnatyshyn. After leaving active service, he earned an EMBA from the University of Ottawa and started MaxSys, a temporary help and contract professional services agency. He received the PC nomination in May 2000 (Ottawa Citizen, 24 October 2000), and campaigned on a platform of expanding Kanata's high-tech services to rural parts of the riding. Considered a star candidate, he was one of two Progressive Conservatives in the Ottawa area to be endorsed by the Ottawa Citizen newspaper (Ottawa Citizen, 22 November 2000).

Brulotte received 12,430 votes (19.61%), finishing third against Canadian Alliance candidate Scott Reid. In 2001, he was part of a six-member panel encouraging unity between the Canadian Alliance and Progressive Conservatives (National Post, 15 May 2001).

He planned to put his campaign organizer behind Bernard Lord in the Progressive Conservative Party's 2002 leadership contest, and was himself mentioned as a possible candidate when Lord declined to run (CanWest News, 23 October 2002). Brulotte is now a supporter of the Conservative Party of Canada.

=== Derrall Bellaire (London-Fanshawe) ===
Bellaire later ran for the Progressive Canadian Party in the 2004 Canadian federal election.

=== Stephen Woollcombe (Ottawa—Vanier) ===
Woollcombe was raised in the Sandy Hill and New Edinburgh areas of Ottawa, and attended Ashbury College (founded by his grandfather). He holds a Master of Arts degree, taught English and Geography in Ahmedabad, Gujarat, India from 1961 to 1963, and was a Canadian diplomat from 1965 to 1995 (Ottawa Citizen, 18 November 2000). He supported affordable housing and official bilingualism for Ottawa (Citizen, 24 November 2000). He received 7,400 votes (15.37%), finishing third against Liberal incumbent Mauril Belanger.

Woollcombe joined the Conservative Party of Canada after the Progressive Conservative Party's merger with the Canadian Alliance, and campaigned for the party's Ottawa—Vanier nomination for the 2004 election. He lost to Kevin Friday, by a vote of 90 to 53. As of 2005, he sits on Ottawa's advisory committee on French language services.

=== Darrin Langen (Peterborough) ===
Darrin Langen is a graduate of the Royal Military College of Canada and served with Special Services at CFB Petawawa from 1979 to 1988. He has military experience in North America, Germany, and Cyprus. He later became president of Dare Technology Consulting and president of the federal Progressive Conservative Association of Peterborough. He ran for the Peterborough city council in 1997, but was defeated. Thirty-eight years old in 2000, Langen was nominated as his party's candidate when the anticipated nominee unexpectedly dropped out of the contest. He anti-abortion but has said that he would vote against any attempt to re-criminalize abortion. He also opposed both the Canadian Firearms Registry and the death penalty. He received 7,034 votes (13.45%), finishing third against Liberal candidate Peter Adams.

Langen was appointed to Peterborough's Culture and Heritage Management Board in 2002. The following year, he supported the Progressive Conservative Party's merger with the more right-wing Canadian Alliance to create the Conservative Party of Canada. He originally planned to seek the new party's nomination for the 2004 federal election, but later declined to stand. He was the first candidate to declare for the Conservative nomination in the buildup to the 2006 election, focusing on health and environmental issues. He was defeated by Dean Del Mastro.

=== Ellery Hollingsworth (Scarborough Southwest) ===
Hollingsworth was 59 years old at the time of the election, and was a retired manager for the Canadian Broadcasting Corporation. He had also served as a school trustee on the Scarborough Board of Education from 1994 to 1997, following unsuccessful campaigns in 1988 and 1991. In an interview with the Toronto Star, he indicated that homelessness, the Young Offenders Act and taxes were his three primary issues (Toronto Star, 19 November 2000). In 1988, he led a movement to save R.H. King Academy.

He received 5,251 votes (14.68%), finishing second against Liberal incumbent Tom Wappel.

=== Alex McGregor (Sudbury) ===
Alex McGregor is a retired professor at Laurentian University. He chaired the Classics department for 22 years, and worked as an occasional newspaper columnist. During the 2000 election, he called for increased spending in health and education as well as tax cuts and the elimination of the Canadian gun registry. He received 2,642 votes (7.62%), finishing fourth against Liberal incumbent Diane Marleau. McGregor did not express any bitterness toward Marleau after the campaign, but lamented that many Progressive Conservative supporters had crossed over to the more right-wing Canadian Alliance. "It boggles the mind how moderate Conservatives could go over to the dark side the way they did", he was quoted as saying.

McGregor supported Jim Prentice's bid for the leadership of the Progressive Conservative Party in June 2003. Later in the year, he supported the Progressive Conservative Party's merger with the Canadian Alliance to create the Conservative Party of Canada.

=== Rob Chopowick (Whitby—Ajax) ===
Chopowick was 37 years old at the time of the election, and worked as a research manager at Toronto Dominion Evergreen (Reuters News, 6 April 2000). He had previously been involved with the Liberal Party for a short period of time (Toronto Star, 23 November 2000).

He received 7,563 votes (15.51%), finishing third against Liberal incumbent Judi Longfield.

=== Ian West (Windsor West) ===
West received 2,116 votes, finishing fourth in a field of six candidates.

=== Jason Daniel Baker (York South—Weston) ===
Baker was a 26-year-old University of Toronto student at the time of the election. He had previously written a series of op-ed letters to Toronto-area newspapers, criticizing both the Liberal and Reform parties. He received 986 votes, finishing fifth against Liberal candidate Alan Tonks.

At the same time as the 2000 federal election, a candidate named "Jason Baker" ran for Ward 15 on Toronto's city council in the 2000 municipal election. It is not clear if this was the same person. The municipal candidate received 405 votes (2.71%) to finish fourth against incumbent councillor Howard Moscoe.

== Manitoba ==
=== Doreen Murray (Churchill) ===
Murray owned a mineral exploration company in Flin Flon at the time of the election (Broadcast News, 1 November 2000). She has previously campaigned for a seat on the Flin Flon city council in 1995, but was defeated. The Progressive Conservatives initially had difficulty finding a candidate in Churchill, and Murray was one of the last candidates to be nominated by her party.

Electoral record
Election	Division	Party	Votes	%	Place	Winner
1995 municipal	Flin Flon council	n/a	819	6.31	11/13	six candidates elected
2000 federal	Churchill	PC	1,198	5.14	4/4	Bev Desjarlais, New Democratic Party

The 1995 results are taken from the Winnipeg Free Press, 26 October 1995. The final official results were not significantly different.

=== Morley McDonald (Portage—Lisgar) ===
McDonald was a truck driver in Manitoba at the time of the election. He previously worked as a police officer (Kingston Whig-Standard, 15 November 2000).

In 1984, McDonald unsuccessfully challenged Progressive Conservative Member of Parliament (MP) Charlie Mayer for the party's nomination in Portage—Neepawa. He focused on bilingualism as his primary issue, and accused the federal party of allowing the Manitoba Progressive Conservatives to be portrayed as bigots and racists for opposing the provincial entrenchment of French-language rights (The Globe and Mail, 28 June 1984).

He was 58 years old at the time of the 2000 election (Winnipeg Free Press, 15 November 2000). He received 5,339 votes (15.51%), finishing third against Canadian Alliance candidate Brian Pallister.

=== Henry C. Dyck (Provencher) ===
Dyck was a veteran organizer for the Progressive Conservatives, and had previously been president of the Provencher riding association (WFP, 28 November 1996). He lived in the riding for twenty years before moving to Winnipeg in 1999 (WFP, 23 November 2000).

The 2000 election was called soon after the formation of the Canadian Alliance, a successor to the Reform Party. Some prominent Progressive Conservatives in rural Manitoba gave their support to the Alliance, and Dyck commented that many voters were initially confused by his presence, believing the Progressive Conservatives would not field a candidate of their own (WFP, 31 October 2000). He received 2,276 votes (6.73%), finishing third against Alliance candidate Vic Toews.

=== Mike Reilly (St. Boniface) ===
Reilly received 4,505 votes in the 2000 election, finishing fourth against Liberal incumbent Ron Duhamel. He campaigned for the Progressive Conservatives again in a by-election for St. Boniface held on May 13, 2002, and received 3,583 votes. On this occasion, he finished third against new Liberal candidate Raymond Simard.

He was 35 years old at the time of the 2002 by-election, and worked as a project manager with the Manitoba Telephone System (Winnipeg Free Press, 5 April 2002). In 2004, Reilly endorsed the newly formed Conservative Party of Canada, which had been formed by a merger of the Progressive Conservative Party with the Canadian Alliance (Winnipeg Free Press, 23 June 2004).

Reilly's wife, Kirsty Reilly, has campaigned for the Progressive Conservative Party of Manitoba at the provincial level.

=== Myron Troniak (Winnipeg North) ===
Troniak is a financial planner, and is listed in a 1998 newspaper report as a consumer mortgage advocate with Benchmark Financial Services (Winnipeg Free Press, 18 April). He also campaigned for a seat on the Assiniboine South school board in 1998. A 2005 report lists him as 47 years old (Manitoba Business, 1 July 2005).

Electoral record
Election	Division	Party	Votes	%	Place	Winner
1998 municipal, Assiniboine South school board	Ward II	n/a	2,275		4/4	three candidates elected
2000 federal	Winnipeg North	P.C.	2,950	12.00	3/4	Judy Wasylycia-Leis, New Democratic Party

=== Geoffrey Lambert (Winnipeg South) ===
Lambert is a political studies professor at the University of Manitoba in Winnipeg. He has written on Canada's political culture, and has provided an award for first-year Political Science students at the University of Manitoba. Lambert has also been the Manitoba contact for the University of Minnesota Alumni Association.

The 2000 election was Lambert's only campaign for public office at the provincial or federal level. He was forced to withdraw shortly before election day for health reasons, although his name remained on the ballot (Canadian Press, 14 November 2000, 21:36 report). He received 3,599 votes (8.55%), finishing fourth against Liberal incumbent Reg Alcock.

Lambert is also a supporter of the Progressive Conservative Party of Manitoba. In 2002, he criticized party leader Stuart Murray for hiring discredited strategist Taras Sokolyk as an adviser (Broadcast News, 16 December 2002).

He wrote Manitoba's contributions to the Canadian annual review of politics and public affairs in 2005.

=== Christopher Brewer (Winnipeg—Transcona) ===
Brewer was a truck driver at the time of the election. He won the Progressive Conservative nomination by acclamation, and received 2,133 votes (6.51%) in the general election for a fourth-place finish against New Democratic Party incumbent Bill Blaikie.

== Saskatchewan ==
=== Kirk Eggum (Saskatoon—Wanuskewin) ===
Eggum was a 22-year-old student at the University of Saskatchewan during the election (Saskatoon Star-Phoenix, 23 November 2000). He was previously a candidate for the Progressive Conservative Party of Saskatchewan during that party's skeletal campaign in the 1999 provincial election. In 2000, he supported the elimination of taxes on scholarships and increased subsidies for post-secondary education.

He is likely related to Kris Eggum, who has also campaigned for the Progressive Conservatives in Saskatchewan.

Electoral record
Election	Division	Party	Votes	%	Place	Winner
1999 provincial	Saskatoon Mount Royal	PC	89		4/4	Eric Cline, New Democratic Party
2000 federal	Saskatoon—Wanuskewin	PC	1,709	5.16	4/5	Maurice Vellacott, Canadian Alliance
