= 2000 Canadian federal election =

- November 27, 2000

301 seats in the House of Commons 151 seats needed for a majority
- Opinion polls
- Turnout: 64.1% (▼2.9 pp)

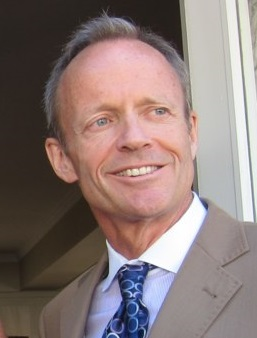

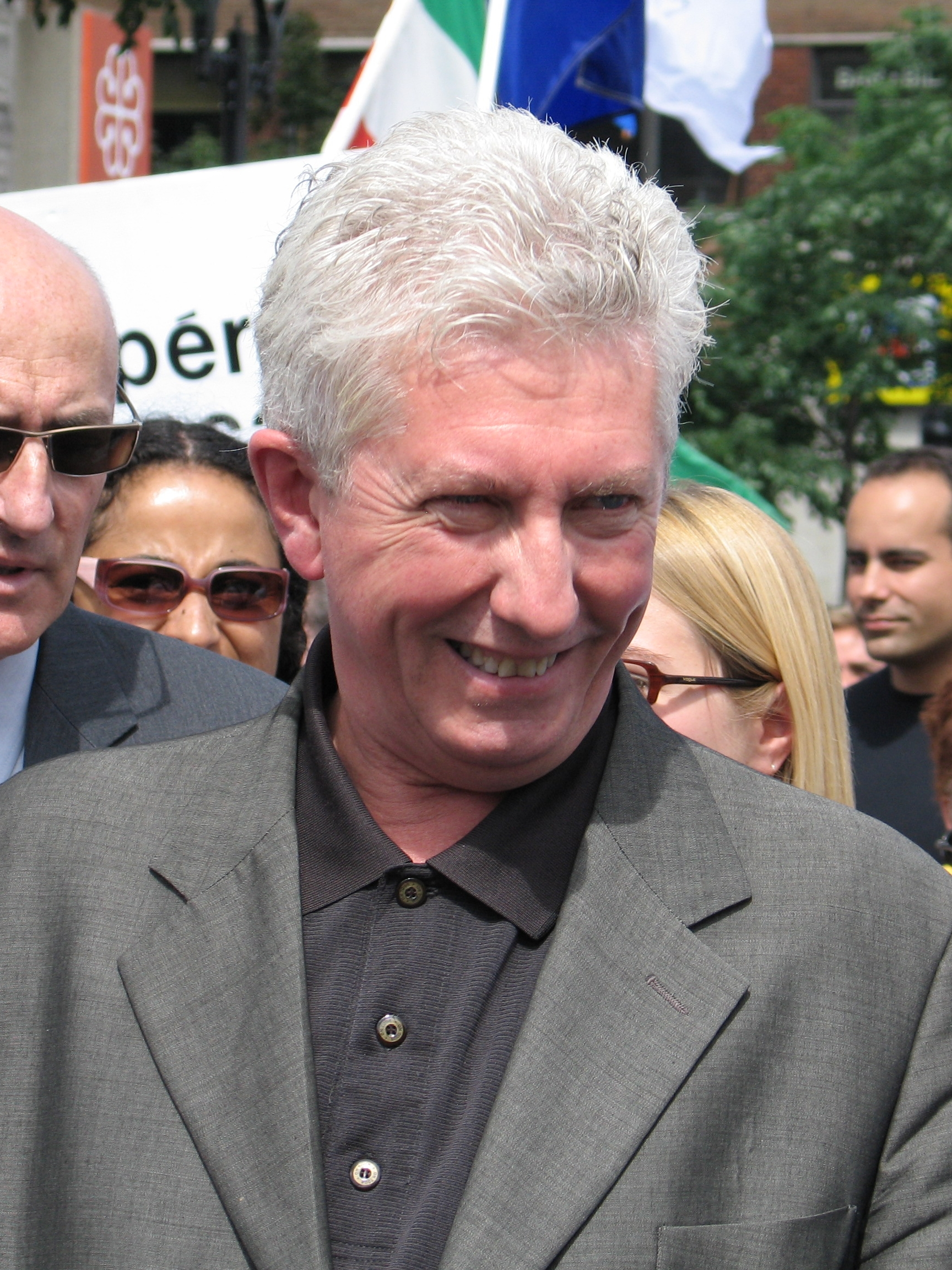

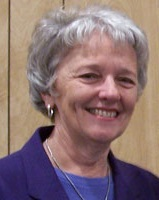

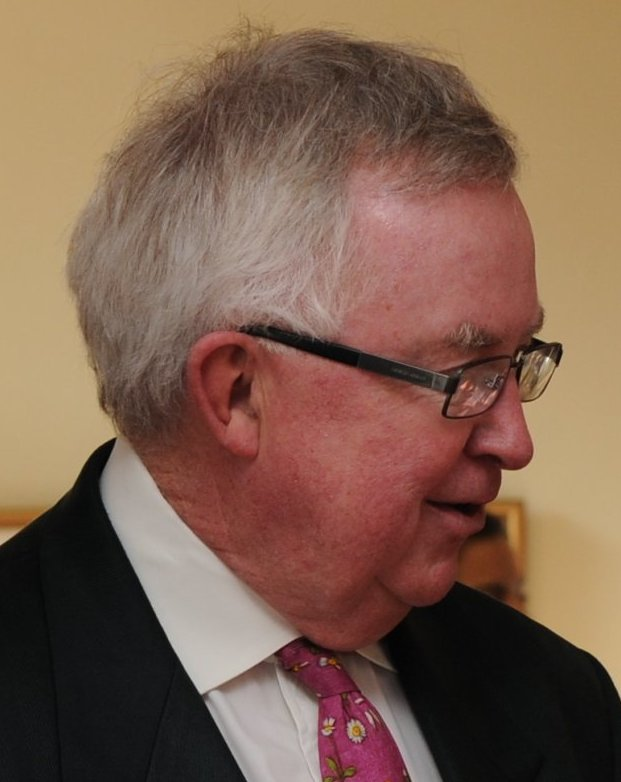
	First party	Second party	Third party
Leader	Jean Chrétien	Stockwell Day	Gilles Duceppe
Party	Liberal	Alliance	Bloc Québécois
Leader since	June 23, 1990	June 24, 2000	March 15, 1997
Leader's seat	Saint-Maurice	Okanagan—Coquihalla	Laurier— Sainte-Marie
Last election	155 seats, 38.46%	60 seats, 19.35%	44 seats, 10.67%
Seats before	161	58	44
Seats won	172	66	38
Seat change	▲11	▲8	▼6
Popular vote	5,252,031	3,276,929	1,377,727
Percentage	40.85%	25.49%	10.72% (Note: Only contested seats in Quebec.)
Swing	▲2.39 pp	▲6.13 pp	▲0.04 pp
	Fourth party	Fifth party
Leader	Alexa McDonough	Joe Clark
Party	New Democratic	Progressive Conservative
Leader since	October 14, 1995	November 14, 1998
Leader's seat	Halifax	Calgary Centre
Last election	21 seats, 11.05%	20 seats, 18.84%
Seats before	19	15
Seats won	13	12
Seat change	▼6	▼3
Popular vote	1,093,868	1,566,998
Percentage	8.51%	12.19%
Swing	▼2.54 pp	▼6.65 pp
Prime Minister before election
Jean Chrétien
Liberal
Prime Minister after election
Jean Chrétien
Liberal

The 2000 Canadian federal election was held on November 27, 2000, to elect members to the House of Commons of Canada of the 37th Parliament of Canada. Prime Minister Jean Chrétien's Liberal Party won a third majority government.

Since the previous election of 1997, small-c conservatives had begun attempts to merge the Reform Party of Canada and the Progressive Conservative Party of Canada as part of the United Alternative agenda. During that time, Jean Charest stepped down as leader of the Progressive Conservatives and former Prime Minister Joe Clark took over the party and opposed any union with the Reform Party. In the spring of 2000, the Reform Party became the Canadian Alliance, a political party dedicated to uniting conservatives together into one party. Former Reform Party leader Preston Manning lost in a leadership race to Stockwell Day who became leader of the new Canadian Alliance party.

The federal government called an early election after being in office for close to three and a half years (with a maximum allowed mandate of five years). The governing Liberal Party of Canada won a third consecutive majority government, winning more seats than in 1997. The Canadian Alliance only made minor gains, and an Eastern breakthrough did not happen. The Bloc Québécois, New Democratic Party and the Progressive Conservatives all suffered slight losses.

The Liberal win made Chrétien the first Canadian prime minister to lead his party to three or more consecutive majority governments since Wilfrid Laurier in 1908. This was the most recent election as of 2026 in which an incumbent government successfully defended its parliamentary majority. It was also the last election until 2025 in which a single party won more than 40% of the popular vote. This was the only election contested by the Canadian Alliance and the last by the Progressive Conservatives (as they both merged into the Conservative Party of Canada in 2003). This was the first election in which Nunavut participated as a separate territory, having previously been part of the Northwest Territories.

== Changes to constituency names ==
The following name changes took effect for the 2000 election:

1997 constituency name and province		New designation
Abitibi	QC	Abitibi—Baie-James—Nunavik
Argenteuil—Papineau	QC	Argenteuil—Papineau—Mirabel
Beauport—Montmorency—Orléans	QC	Beauport—Montmorency—Côte-de-Beaupré—Île-d'Orléans
Bramalea—Gore—Malton	ON	Bramalea—Gore—Malton—Springdale
Bras d'Or	NS	Bras d'Or—Cape Breton
Broadview—Greenwood	ON	Toronto—Danforth
Carleton—Gloucester	ON	Ottawa—Orléans
Charlesbourg	QC	Charlesbourg—Jacques-Cartier
Charleswood—Assiniboine	MB	Charleswood—St. James—Assiniboia
Charlotte	NB	New Brunswick Southwest
Chicoutimi	QC	Chicoutimi—Le Fjord
Edmonton East	AB	Edmonton Centre-East
Kamloops	BC	Kamloops, Thompson and Highland Valleys
Kent—Essex	ON	Chatham-Kent—Essex
Lac-Saint-Jean	QC	Lac-Saint-Jean—Saguenay
Lévis	QC	Lévis-et-Chutes-de-la-Chaudière
Lotbinière	QC	Lotbinière—L'Érable
Port Moody—Coquitlam	BC	Port Moody—Coquitlam—Port Coquitlam
Qu'Appelle	SK	Regina—Qu'Appelle
Richelieu	QC	Bas-Richelieu—Nicolet—Bécancour
Rimouski—Mitis	QC	Rimouski—Neigette-et-La-Mitis
Rosemont	QC	Rosemont—Petite-Patrie
Saint-Eustache—Sainte-Thérèse	QC	Rivière-des-Mille-Îles
Stormont—Dundas	ON	Stormont—Dundas—Charlottenburgh
Verchères	QC	Verchères—Les Patriotes
Verdun—Saint-Henri	QC	Verdun—Saint-Henri—Saint-Paul—Pointe Saint-Charles
Victoria—Haliburton	ON	Haliburton—Victoria—Brock
Wanuskewin	SK	Saskatoon—Wanuskewin
Wentworth—Burlington	ON	Ancaster—Dundas—Flamborough—Aldershot
West Kootenay—Okanagan	BC	Kootenay—Boundary—Okanagan

== Campaign ==
On October 22, 2000, Prime Minister and Liberal Party leader Jean Chrétien advised Governor General Adrienne Clarkson to dissolve parliament and call an election scheduled for November 27, 2000. This move has been viewed by commentators as an attempt to stem a possible rise of support to the newly formed Canadian Alliance, to stop the leadership ambitions of Paul Martin, and to capitalize on the nostalgia created by the recent death of Pierre Trudeau. At the time of the election, the Canadian economy was strong and there were few immediate negative issues, as the opposition parties were not prepared for the campaign.

The major issue in the election was health care which had risen in public opinion polls to be the most important issue for Canadians.

The public was largely uninterested in the election, with commentators stating that voters expected a repeat of previous regionally divided elections that offered little chance of a change of government.

The Liberals' final television advertisement, according to Stephen Clarkson's The Big Red Machine, "emphasized the contrast between [the Liberals and the Canadian Alliance] while warning voters about [PC leader] Joe Clark's claim that he would form a coalition with the Bloc Québécois in a minority government. The ad told Canadians not to take risks with other parties but to choose a strong, proven team".

== Political parties ==
=== Liberal Party ===
Liberal Party logo during the election.

The Liberal Party entered the election with a record of ending the budgetary deficit, making major reductions in federal spending (such as by cuts to the civil service, privatization of crown corporations), creating new environmental regulations, and increasing spending beginning on social programs beginning in 1998 after the budget deficit had ended and a surplus had been achieved. The Liberal Party came under attack by opposition parties for irregularities in the Department of Human Resources' Transition Job Fund program, but Chrétien managed to capably defend the government's actions. Chrétien was directly attacked by the opposition parties for alleged corrupt involvement from the Prime Minister's Office (PMO) in providing funding to local projects in Chrétien's riding of Saint-Maurice. The Liberal Party focused its attacks on the Canadian Alliance, accusing it of being a dangerous right-wing movement that was a threat to national unity. The Liberal Party's most tense problem was the ongoing leadership feud within the Liberal Party between Chrétien and Finance Minister Paul Martin who wanted to replace Chrétien as Liberal leader and Prime Minister.

==== Strategy ====
Due to the regionalized nature of previous elections, the Liberal Party designed its election strategy along regional lines, aiming to take every seat in Ontario, winning seats in Quebec from the Bloc Québécois, and winning seats in Atlantic Canada, while attempting to minimize losses in Western Canada to the Canadian Alliance.

Chrétien only spent parts of nine days campaigning in the West, including only two stops in the province of Alberta, both in the city of Edmonton while visiting the province of British Columbia only three times, and only in the cities of Victoria and Vancouver.

The Liberal Party focused its effort in regaining support in Atlantic Canada, where the party had suffered serious losses in the 1997 election to the New Democratic Party and Progressive Conservative Party due to the Liberal government's imposition of quotas on Atlantic Canadian cod fisheries and the government's cuts to unemployment insurance benefits. Chrétien gained support during the campaign from former New Brunswick Premier Frank McKenna and former Chrétien government minister and then the current Premier of Newfoundland and Labrador, Brian Tobin resigned as Premier and ran as a Liberal Party candidate in his province. During the campaign, Chrétien apologized to Atlantic Canadians for the negative impact of employment insurance reforms which had caused hardship in Atlantic Canada.

In Quebec, the Liberal Party benefited from the collapse of support for the Progressive Conservative Party, after the PCs' popular Québécois leader Jean Charest had resigned in 1998 and was replaced by former Prime Minister Joe Clark who was unpopular in Quebec which resulted in three PC members from Quebec defecting to join the Liberal Party prior to the election. In Quebec the recently passed Clarity Act by the federal government was controversial in that it demanded a clear and concise question on a new referendum on sovereignty. Chrétien defended the Clarity Act and attacked sovereigntist Quebec premier and former Bloc Québécois leader Lucien Bouchard, challenging him to hold another referendum on sovereignty under the new laws, as Chrétien expected that the sovereigntists would lose such a referendum. The Liberal Party promised a number of government projects in Quebec to woo Quebec voters to the Liberal Party.

The Liberal Party appealed to Canada's most populous province of Ontario by acting to restore funding that its government had cut in the 1990s in order to cut the deficit of the 1990s. The Liberal government established a health accord with all premiers in September 2000 that involved major projected increases to public health care spending. Overall, the Liberals increased their number of seats in the House of Commons from 155 seats to 172 seats. They also won the popular vote in their former stronghold of Quebec for the first time since 1980, though they narrowly fell short of winning the most seats in the province, winning 36 seats to the Bloc's 38.

=== Canadian Alliance ===
Canadian Alliance logo during the election.

The Canadian Alliance (the common short form name of Canadian Reform Conservative Alliance) was a new political party in the election, having been created only months earlier as the successor to the Reform Party of Canada, a party founded as a Western Canada protest party which sought to become a national party in the 1990s. Reform Party leader Preston Manning was deeply disappointed with the Reform Party's failure to spread eastward in the 1997 election, as the Reform Party lost its only seat in Ontario in that election. Reform identified vote-splitting with its rival conservative movement, the Progressive Conservative Party as the cause for the Liberals' 1997 election victory, and Manning proposed the solution of a merger of the Reform and Progressive Conservative parties. This agenda by the Reform Party to unite the two parties was called the United Alternative which began in 1998, and ultimately resulted in the Alliance.

The new party subsequently elected Stockwell Day as leader over Manning. The Alliance had hoped to use the 2000 election to eclipse the PC party in Ontario and Eastern Canada. The Alliance dedicated its campaign to demonstrating that the party was a national party and not as western-based as its predecessor had been perceived as. Day's more media friendly and "easy going" persona was expected to appeal to more Ontario voters than Manning's reputation as a policy wonk, and after the United Alternative project had integrated the successful Provincial PCs in the party, the Canadian Alliance was hoping for major improvements.

The Alliance campaigned on: cutting taxes by reducing the Federal taxation rate to two lower tax brackets, an end to the federal gun registration program, and importance of family values. The campaign was dogged by accusations: introducing a two-tier health care—the party would allow private health care to exist alongside the public medicare system; and for threatening the protection of gay rights and abortion rights. The latter accusations tended to focus on the party's residual direct democracy provisions in their platform. The accusations against his party platform, along with Day's relative inexperience compared to decades-experienced fixtures like Clark and Chrétien, led to the party fading from contention.

While they did not force the Liberals into minority government, they did retain their official opposition status, and increased their numbers in the House of Commons by six seats, from 60 to 66. The Alliance ended up winning only two Ontario ridings. On election night, controversy arose when a CBC producer's gratuitously sexist comment about Stockwell Day's daughter-in-law, Juliana Thiessen-Day, was accidentally broadcast on the Canadian networks' pooled election feed from Day's riding.

=== Bloc Québécois ===
Logo of the Bloc Québécois during the election.

The Bloc Québécois suffered from the unpopular decision of its provincial counterpart, the ruling Parti Québécois government's agenda to merge the communities surrounding Quebec City into one community. Many Québécois were angered by this decision and voted in protest against the Bloc or chose not to vote at all to demonstrate their frustration. Bloc leader Gilles Duceppe received negative media attention after he decided to personally appoint candidate Noël Tremblay to run in the riding of Chicoutimi—Le Fjord in spite of the Bloc's riding association's selection of Sylvain Gaudreault to run in the riding. The Bloc's 177 page platform was criticized as being far too large, thus few copies were distributed, few internet users accessed the platform, and it was rarely discussed during the campaign. Instead, the Bloc produced large numbers of copies of small booklets that outlined the policies within the large platform. The Bloc campaigned to try to win over previous supporters of the PC Party. This campaign strategy failed, as the Bloc lost seats to the Liberal Party due to the collapse of Quebec support for the Progressive Conservative Party, whose voters shifted to the Liberal Party. The Bloc won in 38 ridings, six ridings fewer than in the 1997 election.

=== New Democratic Party ===
Logo of the New Democratic Party during the election.

The New Democratic Party suffered badly in the campaign due to the drop in support for the provincial New Democratic parties over the preceding decade and amid a scandal in 2000 facing British Columbia's NDP Premier Glen Clark who was forced to resign as Premier. Matters were made worse for the federal NDP after Saskatchewan's NDP Premier Roy Romanow resigned in 2000 after the party lost seats in the 1999 Saskatchewan provincial election, and afterwards suggested that the federal NDP should merge with the Liberal Party. In Nova Scotia, the provincial NDP lost seats in its 1999 election while the NDP government of the Yukon had been recently defeated. As Canada's major social democratic political party, it relied on support from the labour movement, but recent strains between the NDP and the Canadian Auto Workers union and the Canadian Labour Congress had weakened the party's base of support. The party had received little media attention during the election and 2000 as a whole, due to the media's focus on Canada's newest political party, the Canadian Alliance, the political comeback of former Prime Minister Joe Clark to the leadership of the Progressive Conservative Party, and the leadership feud within the Liberal Party between Jean Chrétien and Paul Martin. The NDP did not expect to do well in the election and aimed to win thirty-two "must-win" seats.

The NDP's platform and campaign focused on protecting medicare while attacking the Liberal Party for its tax cuts to wealthy Canadians and corporations. The NDP's focus on attacking the Liberals failed to recognize the surging support for the Canadian Alliance in the province of Saskatchewan, where the NDP had hoped to gain seats. The NDP failed to galvanize support, as it remained low in support in polling results throughout most of the election campaign. NDP leader Alexa McDonough performed badly in the French-language debate due to her not being fluent in French. In the English-language debate, McDonough attacked Alliance leader Stockwell Day for favouring two-tier health care and attacked Liberal leader Jean Chrétien for giving out tax cuts to the wealthy rather than funding Canada's public health care system.

=== Progressive Conservative Party ===
Logo of the Progressive Conservative Party during the election.

The Progressive Conservative Party aimed to regain its former place in Canadian politics under the leadership of former Prime Minister Joe Clark. The PC Party had a very disappointing election, recording its lowest ever share of the national vote, falling from 20 to 12 seats, and being almost exclusively confined to the Maritime provinces. It won the 12 seats needed for Official party status in the House of Commons, however.

== Results ==
Summary of the 2000 House of Commons of Canada election results
Party	Party leader	Candidates	Seats				Popular vote		
Party	Party leader	Candidates	1997	Dissol.	Elected	% Change	#	%	Change
Liberal	Jean Chrétien	301	155	161	172	+11.0%	5,252,031	40.85%	+2.39pp
Alliance	Stockwell Day	298	60	58	66	+10.0%	3,276,929	25.49%	+6.13pp^{1}
Bloc Québécois	Gilles Duceppe	75	44	44	38	-13.6%	1,377,727	10.72%	+0.05pp
New Democratic	Alexa McDonough	298	21	19	13	-38.1%	1,093,868	8.51%	-2.54pp
Progressive Conservative	Joe Clark	291	20	15	12	-40.0%	1,566,998	12.19%	-6.65pp
Green	Joan Russow	111	-	-	-	-	104,402	0.81%	+0.38pp
Marijuana	Marc-Boris St-Maurice	73	*	-	-	*	66,258	0.52%	*
Independent and No Affiliation		86	1	4	-	-100%	55,036	0.43%	-0.04pp
Canadian Action	Paul T. Hellyer	70	-	-	-	-	27,103	0.21%	+0.08pp
Natural Law	Neil Paterson	69	-	-	-	-	16,577	0.13%	-0.16pp
Marxist–Leninist	Sandra L. Smith	84	-	-	-	-	12,068	0.09%	-
Communist	Miguel Figueroa	52	*	-	-	*	8,776	0.07%	*
Vacant				-					
Total		1,808	301	301	301	±0.0%	12,857,773	100%	-
Sources: Elections Canada Web Site History of Federal Ridings since 1867 Archived December 4, 2008, at the Wayback Machine

Notes:

"% change" refers to change from previous election

* – Party did not nominate candidates in the previous election

^{1} – percentage change from Reform Party of Canada in previous election.

=== Synopsis of results ===
Results by riding — 2000 Canadian federal election
Riding		Winning party							Turnout (Note: Including spoiled ballots)	Votes (Note: Minor political parties receiving less than 1% of the popular vote (other than ones which had a significant number of candidates receiving more than 1,000 votes) are aggregated under Other)									
Riding		1997	1st place	Votes	Share	Margin #	Margin %	2nd place	Turnout	Lib	All	BQ	NDP	PC	Green	Mar	Ind	Other	Total
Athabasca	AB	Ref	All	18,775	54.46%	8,982	26.05%	Lib	56.3%	9,793	18,775	–	872	4,224	345	469	–	–	34,478
Calgary Centre	AB	Ref	PC	26,358	46.05%	4,304	7.52%	All	56.8%	5,630	22,054	–	1,604	26,358	1,170	–	293	133	57,242
Calgary East	AB	Ref	All	18,141	54.26%	11,298	33.79%	Lib	48.2%	6,843	18,141	–	1,444	5,510	–	1,222	–	276	33,436
Calgary Northeast	AB	Ref	All	28,242	62.54%	18,401	40.75%	Lib	50.6%	9,841	28,242	–	1,852	5,222	–	–	–	–	45,157
Calgary Southeast	AB	Ref	All	34,492	63.25%	23,139	42.43%	PC	63.9%	6,646	34,492	–	1,111	11,353	931	–	–	–	54,533
Calgary Southwest	AB	Ref	All	34,529	64.81%	25,850	48.52%	PC	62.9%	7,954	34,529	–	2,113	8,679	–	–	–	–	53,275
Calgary West	AB	Ref	All	33,222	54.05%	19,963	32.48%	PC	61.9%	11,181	33,222	–	2,350	13,259	1,456	–	–	–	61,468
Calgary—Nose Hill	AB	Ref	All	35,904	60.13%	24,302	40.70%	Lib	59.5%	11,602	35,904	–	2,227	8,696	1,092	–	–	194	59,715
Crowfoot	AB	Ref	All	33,767	70.56%	26,989	56.40%	PC	66.2%	2,964	33,767	–	1,457	6,778	–	–	2,891 (Note: Jack Ramsay, elected in 1997 under the Reform banner, received 2,668 votes.)	–	47,857
Edmonton Centre-East	AB	Ref	All	17,768	42.44%	3,445	8.23%	Lib	53.4%	14,323	17,768	–	7,304	2,252	–	–	–	222	41,869
Edmonton North	AB	Ref	All	22,063	51.22%	7,277	16.89%	Lib	57.2%	14,786	22,063	–	3,216	3,010	–	–	–	–	43,075
Edmonton Southeast	AB	Lib	Lib	21,109	50.87%	4,717	11.37%	All	61.8%	21,109	16,392	–	1,285	2,269	–	–	–	438	41,493
Edmonton Southwest	AB	Ref	All	26,197	48.85%	7,974	14.87%	Lib	64.1%	18,223	26,197	–	2,746	5,803	462	–	–	195	53,626
Edmonton West	AB	Lib	Lib	21,978	44.24%	733	1.48%	All	56.3%	21,978	21,245	–	2,895	3,009	–	–	–	548	49,675
Edmonton—Strathcona	AB	Ref	All	23,463	42.00%	5,647	10.11%	Lib	62.8%	17,816	23,463	–	8,256	5,047	–	814	–	463	55,859
Elk Island	AB	Ref	All	33,730	64.23%	24,441	46.54%	Lib	66.6%	9,289	33,730	–	3,316	6,178	–	–	–	–	52,513
Lakeland	AB	Ref	All	29,348	65.45%	20,298	45.27%	Lib	63.6%	9,050	29,348	–	2,069	4,373	–	–	–	–	44,840
Lethbridge	AB	Ref	All	30,380	66.02%	22,583	49.08%	Lib	61.9%	7,797	30,380	–	2,648	4,062	864	–	–	264	46,015
Macleod	AB	Ref	All	30,783	70.05%	24,704	56.22%	PC	62.8%	4,137	30,783	–	2,945	6,079	–	–	–	–	43,944
Medicine Hat	AB	Ref	All	31,134	74.28%	26,742	63.80%	Lib	58.7%	4,392	31,134	–	2,153	4,236	–	–	–	–	41,915
Peace River	AB	Ref	All	27,508	65.59%	21,013	50.10%	Lib	55.1%	6,495	27,508	–	2,914	5,021	–	–	–	–	41,938
Red Deer	AB	Ref	All	36,940	72.61%	30,418	59.79%	Lib	60.4%	6,522	36,940	–	2,346	5,064	–	–	–	–	50,872
St. Albert	AB	Ref	All	32,745	59.50%	19,108	34.72%	Lib	65.9%	13,637	32,745	–	2,965	5,687	–	–	–	–	55,034
Wetaskiwin	AB	Ref	All	33,675	69.50%	25,357	52.34%	Lib	64.0%	8,318	33,675	–	2,045	4,413	–	–	–	–	48,451
Wild Rose	AB	Ref	All	40,193	70.36%	32,823	57.46%	PC	62.5%	6,334	40,193	–	2,320	7,370	–	–	908	–	57,125
Yellowhead	AB	Ref	All	26,824	66.08%	20,476	50.44%	Lib	60.4%	6,348	26,824	–	1,910	5,141	–	–	371	–	40,594
Burnaby—Douglas	BC	NDP	NDP	17,018	37.39%	1,961	4.31%	All	62.3%	10,774	15,057	–	17,018	2,477	–	–	–	189	45,515
Cariboo—Chilcotin	BC	Ref	All	19,213	59.63%	12,658	39.29%	Lib	60.5%	6,555	19,213	–	2,915	2,822	–	–	591	124	32,220
Delta—South Richmond	BC	Ref	All	30,882	56.79%	15,024	27.63%	Lib	65.8%	15,858	30,882	–	3,060	3,838	–	–	225	517	54,380
Dewdney—Alouette	BC	Ref	All	28,181	58.42%	19,464	40.35%	Lib	63.4%	8,717	28,181	–	5,535	5,804	–	–	–	–	48,237
Esquimalt—Juan de Fuca	BC	Ref	All	23,982	49.73%	12,446	25.81%	Lib	61.5%	11,536	23,982	–	6,468	3,857	2,056	–	–	324	48,223
Fraser Valley	BC	Ref	All	38,509	69.97%	29,544	53.68%	Lib	63.9%	8,965	38,509	–	3,185	2,330	528	811	212	494	55,034
Kamloops, Thompson and Highland Valleys	BC	NDP	All	23,577	48.59%	9,977	20.56%	NDP	67.4%	7,582	23,577	–	13,600	3,217	–	–	–	544	48,520
Kelowna	BC	Ref	All	33,810	59.47%	20,246	35.61%	Lib	64.0%	13,564	33,810	–	3,572	4,708	–	–	–	1,199	56,853
Kootenay—Boundary—Okanagan	BC	Ref	All	19,386	46.70%	8,029	19.34%	Lib	64.9%	11,357	19,386	–	4,091	2,147	2,689	889	–	953	41,512
Kootenay—Columbia	BC	Ref	All	25,663	67.78%	20,082	53.04%	Lib	65.2%	5,581	25,663	–	3,297	2,165	1,158	–	–	–	37,864
Langley—Abbotsford	BC	Ref	All	38,810	70.11%	29,256	52.85%	Lib	66.9%	9,554	38,810	–	2,353	4,218	–	–	420	–	55,355
Nanaimo—Alberni	BC	Ref	All	26,516	50.45%	15,639	29.76%	Lib	64.9%	10,877	26,516	–	7,635	5,340	–	1,125	830	235	52,558
Nanaimo—Cowichan	BC	Ref	All	23,641	46.63%	12,784	25.22%	Lib	64.6%	10,857	23,641	–	8,599	3,640	1,196	1,262	–	1,500	50,695
New Westminster—Coquitlam—Burnaby	BC	Ref	All	20,698	43.97%	6,119	13.00%	Lib	60.1%	14,579	20,698	–	7,076	3,492	1,028	–	–	202	47,075
North Vancouver	BC	Ref	All	27,920	49.88%	9,577	17.11%	Lib	68.8%	18,343	27,920	–	2,760	3,975	–	1,008	1,013	957	55,976
Okanagan—Coquihalla	BC	Ref	All	28,794	59.37%	18,871	38.91%	Lib	65.5%	9,923	28,794	–	4,096	2,939	1,110	818	95	727	48,502
Okanagan—Shuswap	BC	Ref	All	29,345	61.30%	19,490	40.71%	Lib	65.6%	9,855	29,345	–	4,060	3,096	–	–	447	1,071	47,874
Port Moody—Coquitlam—Port Coquitlam	BC	Ref	All	28,631	49.69%	11,694	20.29%	Lib	63.4%	16,937	28,631	–	5,340	4,506	839	818	–	550	57,621
Prince George–Bulkley Valley	BC	Ref	All	20,596	58.84%	12,394	35.41%	Lib	59.3%	8,202	20,596	–	2,029	2,448	793	–	152	785	35,005
Prince George—Peace River	BC	Ref	All	23,840	69.62%	18,521	54.08%	Lib	56.7%	5,319	23,840	–	1,597	2,103	744	–	–	642	34,245
Richmond	BC	Lib	All	21,064	44.41%	1,124	2.37%	Lib	61.7%	19,940	21,064	–	2,695	2,578	897	–	–	257	47,431
Saanich—Gulf Islands	BC	Ref	All	25,392	43.16%	6,390	10.86%	Lib	70.6%	19,002	25,392	–	4,721	6,049	3,243	–	123	305	58,835
Skeena	BC	Ref	All	12,787	42.73%	4,073	13.61%	Lib	59.7%	8,714	12,787	–	6,273	965	688	–	361	140	29,928
South Surrey—White Rock—Langley	BC	Ref	All	28,762	59.95%	18,562	38.69%	Lib	67.8%	10,200	28,762	–	2,718	4,796	844	559	–	100	47,979
Surrey Central	BC	Ref	All	29,812	51.61%	10,299	17.83%	Lib	59.5%	19,513	29,812	–	3,211	3,940	1,175	–	–	114	57,765
Surrey North	BC	Ref	All	19,973	56.10%	9,694	27.23%	Lib	55.4%	10,279	19,973	–	2,619	1,714	556	–	285	174	35,600
Vancouver Centre	BC	Lib	Lib	24,553	42.30%	9,377	16.15%	All	60.5%	24,553	15,176	–	6,993	6,828	2,285	1,116	–	1,093	58,044
Vancouver East	BC	NDP	NDP	16,818	42.28%	3,397	8.54%	Lib	55.9%	13,421	5,536	–	16,818	1,439	975	724	339	529	39,781
Vancouver Island North	BC	Ref	All	24,844	51.04%	12,752	26.20%	Lib	64.5%	12,092	24,844	–	5,701	2,997	2,532	–	216	297	48,679
Vancouver Kingsway	BC	Lib	Lib	16,118	43.07%	5,042	13.47%	All	56.0%	16,118	11,076	–	5,921	1,803	1,009	–	–	1,494	37,421
Vancouver Quadra	BC	Lib	Lib	22,253	44.84%	3,640	7.33%	All	63.3%	22,253	18,613	–	2,595	4,112	1,434	–	–	625	49,632
Vancouver South—Burnaby	BC	Lib	Lib	17,705	42.70%	2,321	5.60%	All	58.4%	17,705	15,384	–	3,848	2,649	646	–	623	612	41,467
Victoria	BC	Lib	Lib	23,730	42.65%	7,228	12.99%	All	63.6%	23,730	16,502	–	7,243	3,629	3,264	863	176	230	55,637
West Vancouver—Sunshine Coast	BC	Ref	All	25,546	47.97%	11,377	21.36%	Lib	63.8%	14,169	25,546	–	3,351	4,993	2,605	1,618	–	976	53,258
Brandon—Souris	MB	PC	PC	13,707	37.41%	2,029	5.54%	All	67.0%	6,544	11,678	–	4,518	13,707	–	–	94	102	36,643
Charleswood—St. James—Assiniboia	MB	Lib	Lib	13,901	36.21%	2,332	6.08%	All	67.0%	13,901	11,569	–	2,786	9,991	–	–	–	138	38,385
Churchill	MB	NDP	NDP	10,477	44.94%	2,963	12.71%	Lib	51.1%	7,514	4,126	–	10,477	1,198	–	–	–	–	23,315
Dauphin—Swan River	MB	Ref	All	15,855	47.66%	8,764	26.35%	Lib	63.5%	7,091	15,855	–	5,813	3,946	–	–	189	372	33,266
Portage—Lisgar	MB	Ref	All	17,318	50.31%	11,185	32.49%	Lib	61.6%	6,133	17,318	–	2,073	5,339	–	–	3,558	–	34,421
Provencher	MB	Lib	All	21,358	52.76%	6,939	17.14%	Lib	70.0%	14,419	21,358	–	1,980	2,726	–	–	–	–	40,483
Saint Boniface	MB	Lib	Lib	20,173	52.17%	11,211	28.99%	All	64.2%	20,173	8,962	–	5,026	4,505	–	–	–	–	38,666
Selkirk—Interlake	MB	Ref	All	17,856	43.82%	8,244	20.23%	Lib	66.7%	9,612	17,856	–	8,113	4,992	–	–	178	–	40,751
Winnipeg Centre	MB	NDP	NDP	11,263	41.26%	1,953	7.16%	Lib	52.6%	9,310	3,975	–	11,263	1,915	698	–	–	134	27,295
Winnipeg North Centre	MB	NDP	NDP	14,356	58.39%	7,601	30.92%	Lib	51.9%	6,755	–	–	14,356	2,950	–	–	–	525	24,586
Winnipeg North—St. Paul	MB	Lib	Lib	14,556	38.78%	3,144	8.38%	All	64.1%	14,556	11,412	–	7,931	2,959	232	–	126	318	37,534
Winnipeg South	MB	Lib	Lib	21,433	50.94%	8,795	20.90%	All	66.4%	21,433	12,638	–	4,224	3,599	–	–	183	–	42,077
Winnipeg South Centre	MB	Lib	Lib	15,231	40.46%	4,556	12.10%	PC	62.5%	15,231	3,210	–	7,501	10,675	–	640	–	383	37,640
Winnipeg—Transcona	MB	NDP	NDP	15,680	47.85%	7,344	22.41%	All	58.4%	6,041	8,336	–	15,680	2,133	229	–	264	87	32,770
Acadie—Bathurst	NB	NDP	NDP	23,568	46.61%	3,206	6.34%	Lib	75.4%	20,362	2,314	–	23,568	4,321	–	–	–	–	50,565
Beauséjour—Petitcodiac	NB	NDP	Lib	21,465	47.10%	6,834	15.00%	PC	71.3%	21,465	6,256	–	3,217	14,631	–	–	–	–	45,569
Fredericton	NB	Lib	Lib	14,175	38.60%	3,256	8.87%	PC	62.8%	14,175	8,814	–	2,584	10,919	–	–	–	233	36,725
Fundy—Royal	NB	PC	PC	15,279	40.51%	3,857	10.23%	Lib	68.5%	11,422	8,392	–	2,628	15,279	–	–	–	–	37,721
Madawaska—Restigouche	NB	PC	Lib	19,913	52.27%	5,496	14.43%	PC	69.3%	19,913	1,958	–	1,811	14,417	–	–	–	–	38,099
Miramichi	NB	Lib	Lib	17,047	51.44%	8,706	26.27%	PC	71.4%	17,047	5,298	–	2,453	8,341	–	–	–	–	33,139
Moncton—Riverview—Dieppe	NB	Lib	Lib	26,545	58.74%	18,415	40.75%	All	62.7%	26,545	8,130	–	3,139	7,082	–	–	–	297	45,193
New Brunswick Southwest	NB	PC	PC	14,489	47.25%	6,047	19.72%	Lib	67.6%	8,442	6,562	–	1,173	14,489	–	–	–	–	30,666
Saint John	NB	PC	PC	16,751	50.92%	7,216	21.93%	Lib	60.3%	9,535	2,980	–	2,989	16,751	131	461	–	52	32,899
Tobique—Mactaquac	NB	PC	Lib	10,897	33.60%	147	0.45%	PC	68.2%	10,897	9,573	–	1,216	10,750	–	–	–	–	32,436
Bonavista—Trinity—Conception	NL	Lib	Lib	22,096	54.38%	11,087	27.29%	PC	61.2%	22,096 (Note: Brian Tobin had also been Premier of Newfoundland (1996-2000).)	1,051	–	6,473	11,009	–	–	–	–	40,629
Burin—St. George's	NL	PC	Lib	14,603	47.52%	6,712	21.84%	Ind	58.0%	14,603	1,511	–	924	5,798	–	–	7,891	–	30,727
Gander—Grand Falls	NL	Lib	Lib	15,874	55.02%	7,683	26.63%	PC	50.8%	15,874	1,912	–	2,876	8,191	–	–	–	–	28,853
Humber—St. Barbe—Baie Verte	NL	Lib	Lib	15,405	48.53%	7,108	22.39%	NDP	58.2%	15,405	1,702	–	8,297	6,340	–	–	–	–	31,744
Labrador	NL	Lib	Lib	7,153	68.99%	5,869	56.61%	NDP	53.0%	7,153	677	–	1,284	1,254	–	–	–	–	10,368
St. John's East	NL	PC	PC	23,606	53.22%	9,771	22.03%	Lib	57.5%	13,835	1,144	–	5,395	23,606	–	–	254	122	44,356
St. John's West	NL	PC	PC	22,959	53.62%	8,822	20.60%	Lib	57.1%	14,137	840	–	4,744	22,959	–	–	–	141	42,821
Bras d'Or—Cape Breton	NS	NDP	Lib	20,815	54.85%	12,701	33.47%	PC	68.2%	20,815	1,483	–	7,537	8,114	–	–	–	–	37,949
Cumberland—Colchester	NS	PC	PC	18,716	48.49%	8,445	21.88%	Lib	62.3%	10,271	4,981	–	4,629	18,716	–	–	–	–	38,597
Dartmouth	NS	NDP	NDP	13,585	36.28%	1,177	3.14%	Lib	59.8%	12,408	3,282	–	13,585	8,085	–	–	–	86	37,446
Halifax	NS	NDP	NDP	16,563	40.36%	3,024	7.37%	Lib	60.7%	13,539	2,348	–	16,563	7,255	590	627	–	113	41,035
Halifax West	NS	NDP	Lib	18,327	39.21%	4,311	9.22%	NDP	60.5%	18,327	4,531	–	14,016	9,701	–	–	–	160	46,735
Kings—Hants	NS	PC	PC	17,612	40.29%	4,399	10.06%	Lib	60.0%	13,213	4,618	–	7,244	17,612	–	669	140	218	43,714
Pictou—Antigonish—Guysborough	NS	PC	PC	19,298	48.41%	6,713	16.84%	Lib	67.6%	12,585	2,930	–	4,498	19,298	–	–	552	–	39,863
Sackville—Musquodoboit Valley—Eastern Shore	NS	NDP	NDP	13,619	34.48%	755	1.91%	Lib	61.5%	12,864	4,773	–	13,619	7,589	–	658	–	–	39,503
South Shore	NS	PC	PC	14,328	39.69%	1,651	4.57%	Lib	61.8%	12,677	4,697	–	4,394	14,328	–	–	–	–	36,096
Sydney—Victoria	NS	NDP	Lib	19,388	49.83%	5,172	13.29%	NDP	64.8%	19,388	1,528	–	14,216	3,779	–	–	–	–	38,911
West Nova	NS	PC	Lib	12,783	36.09%	703	1.98%	PC	68.0%	12,783	6,581	–	3,976	12,080	–	–	–	–	35,420
Algoma—Manitoulin	ON	Lib	Lib	15,000	48.36%	6,008	19.37%	All	57.9%	15,000	8,992	–	4,326	2,269	428	–	–	–	31,015
Ancaster—Dundas—Flamborough—Aldershot	ON	Lib	Lib	19,921	41.16%	4,649	9.61%	All	65.0%	19,921	15,272	–	3,756	9,451	–	–	–	–	48,400
Barrie—Simcoe—Bradford	ON	Lib	Lib	26,309	48.27%	8,709	15.98%	All	54.8%	26,309	17,600	–	2,385	7,588	–	–	234	387	54,503
Beaches—East York	ON	Lib	Lib	22,515	52.74%	13,579	31.81%	NDP	56.9%	22,515	3,838	–	8,936	5,766	599	682	–	351	42,687
Bramalea—Gore—Malton—Springdale	ON	Lib	Lib	21,917	57.05%	14,703	38.27%	All	49.5%	21,917	7,214	–	1,864	6,019	–	–	783	619	38,416
Brampton Centre	ON	Lib	Lib	18,365	50.64%	9,136	25.19%	PC	50.4%	18,365	6,247	–	1,795	9,229	628	–	–	–	36,264
Brampton West—Mississauga	ON	Lib	Lib	31,041	66.38%	23,375	49.99%	All	47.6%	31,041	7,666	–	1,567	5,957	529	–	–	–	46,760
Brant	ON	Lib	Lib	24,068	56.42%	13,113	30.74%	All	56.3%	24,068	10,955	–	3,126	3,580	484	–	–	447	42,660
Bruce—Grey—Owen Sound	ON	Lib	Lib	19,817	44.22%	3,857	8.61%	All	62.1%	19,817	15,960	–	2,166	6,872	–	–	–	–	44,815
Burlington	ON	Lib	Lib	22,175	46.77%	10,675	22.52%	All	61.3%	22,175	11,500	–	1,722	11,240	771	–	–	–	47,408
Cambridge	ON	Lib	Lib	22,148	46.60%	7,233	15.22%	All	57.4%	22,148	14,915	–	4,111	5,988	–	–	160	210	47,532
Chatham-Kent—Essex	ON	Lib	Lib	20,085	49.71%	7,128	17.64%	All	56.5%	20,085	12,957	–	2,209	4,156	715	–	73	213	40,408
Davenport	ON	Lib	Lib	17,014	66.72%	13,557	53.16%	NDP	51.2%	17,014	2,021	–	3,457	1,526	642	480	–	361	25,501
Don Valley East	ON	Lib	Lib	25,915	66.60%	20,270	52.09%	PC	54.8%	25,915	4,736	–	2,249	5,645	–	–	212	153	38,910
Don Valley West	ON	Lib	Lib	25,329	55.37%	14,746	32.24%	PC	60.9%	25,329	7,239	–	2,024	10,583	–	469	–	97	45,741
Dufferin—Peel—Wellington—Grey	ON	Lib	Lib	21,678	45.57%	6,650	13.98%	All	58.4%	21,678	15,028	–	1,473	7,926	1,464	–	–	–	47,569
Durham	ON	Lib	Lib	20,602	45.20%	6,859	15.05%	All	56.6%	20,602	13,743	–	2,545	8,367	–	–	326	–	45,583
Eglinton—Lawrence	ON	Lib	Lib	25,161	60.68%	18,005	43.43%	PC	57.6%	25,161	5,497	–	2,663	7,156	688	–	–	297	41,462
Elgin—Middlesex—London	ON	Lib	Lib	17,202	41.02%	1,706	4.07%	All	59.4%	17,202	15,496	–	2,319	6,080	431	–	407	–	41,935
Erie—Lincoln	ON	Lib	Lib	17,054	42.21%	2,062	5.10%	All	61.1%	17,054	14,992	–	2,423	5,174	–	–	476	280	40,399
Essex	ON	Lib	Lib	20,524	44.33%	4,505	9.73%	All	58.5%	20,524	16,019	–	6,431	3,175	–	–	–	152	46,301
Etobicoke Centre	ON	Lib	Lib	26,083	56.37%	15,765	34.07%	All	62.3%	26,083	10,318	–	2,124	7,566	–	–	–	181	46,272
Etobicoke North	ON	Lib	Lib	23,345	72.54%	17,065	53.03%	All	50.1%	23,345	6,280	–	2,210	–	–	–	–	347	32,182
Etobicoke—Lakeshore	ON	Lib	Lib	22,467	51.78%	13,307	30.67%	All	57.8%	22,467	9,160	–	2,835	8,453	–	–	–	473	43,388
Glengarry—Prescott—Russell	ON	Lib	Lib	31,371	67.96%	22,739	49.26%	All	63.4%	31,371	8,632	–	1,877	3,942	–	–	–	340	46,162
Guelph—Wellington	ON	Lib	Lib	26,440	48.19%	15,403	28.07%	All	61.1%	26,440	11,037	–	5,685	10,188	966	–	275	275	54,866
Haldimand—Norfolk—Brant	ON	Lib	Lib	20,867	46.82%	5,451	12.23%	All	61.9%	20,867	15,416	–	2,124	5,761	–	–	–	397	44,565
Haliburton—Victoria—Brock	ON	Lib	Lib	16,710	33.95%	1,119	2.27%	All	62.0%	16,710	15,591	–	2,409	14,508	–	–	–	–	49,218
Halton	ON	Lib	Lib	28,168	47.27%	12,512	21.00%	All	60.3%	28,168	15,656	–	2,633	12,114	1,018	–	–	–	59,589
Hamilton East	ON	Lib	Lib	16,435	52.85%	10,396	33.43%	All	48.4%	16,435	6,039	–	4,111	3,321	–	575	270	346	31,097
Hamilton Mountain	ON	Lib	Lib	22,536	50.91%	12,915	29.17%	All	57.4%	22,536	9,621	–	4,387	7,467	–	–	–	259	44,270
Hamilton West	ON	Lib	Lib	21,273	52.72%	13,978	34.64%	All	56.7%	21,273	7,295	–	5,300	5,024	616	437	163	246	40,354
Hastings—Frontenac—Lennox and Addington	ON	Lib	Lib	16,996	39.00%	3,769	8.65%	All	61.3%	16,996	13,227	–	2,200	10,231	516	–	250	156	43,576
Huron—Bruce	ON	Lib	Lib	21,547	49.91%	11,204	25.95%	All	64.6%	21,547	10,343	–	2,669	8,138	–	–	249	225	43,171
Kenora—Rainy River	ON	Lib	Lib	14,416	45.21%	5,291	16.59%	All	58.4%	14,416	9,125	–	6,868	1,476	–	–	–	–	31,885
Kingston and the Islands	ON	Lib	Lib	26,457	51.69%	17,235	33.67%	PC	58.5%	26,457	7,904	–	4,951	9,222	2,652	–	–	–	51,186
Kitchener Centre	ON	Lib	Lib	23,511	52.84%	11,908	26.76%	All	55.5%	23,511	11,603	–	3,058	6,162	–	–	–	158	44,492
Kitchener—Waterloo	ON	Lib	Lib	27,132	50.34%	14,730	27.33%	All	59.1%	27,132	12,402	–	4,394	8,621	809	–	105	437	53,900
Lambton—Kent—Middlesex	ON	Lib	Lib	21,124	48.95%	7,822	18.13%	All	62.6%	21,124	13,302	–	1,871	5,918	341	–	365	232	43,153
Lanark—Carleton	ON	Lib	All	24,670	38.93%	1,859	2.93%	Lib	66.1%	22,811	24,670	–	1,946	12,430	871	–	150	495	63,373
Leeds—Grenville	ON	Lib	Lib	18,594	39.51%	55	0.12%	All	65.4%	18,594	18,539	–	990	7,940	816	–	–	181	47,060
London North Centre	ON	Lib	Lib	22,795	51.46%	13,733	31.00%	All	54.2%	22,795	9,062	–	3,936	7,305	681	453	–	65	44,297
London West	ON	Lib	Lib	23,794	49.37%	13,632	28.29%	All	59.2%	23,794	10,162	–	3,596	9,788	614	–	–	241	48,195
London—Fanshawe	ON	Lib	Lib	19,677	54.81%	11,679	32.53%	All	50.6%	19,677	7,998	–	4,107	4,119	–	–	–	–	35,901
Markham	ON	PC	Lib	32,104	66.64%	23,089	47.92%	All	56.8%	32,104	9,015	–	1,129	5,085	493	–	222	130	48,178
Mississauga Centre	ON	Lib	Lib	24,381	64.13%	17,738	46.66%	All	51.3%	24,381	6,643	–	1,404	5,077	–	389	–	125	38,019
Mississauga East	ON	Lib	Lib	22,158	64.50%	16,786	48.86%	All	52.1%	22,158	5,372	–	1,451	5,144	–	–	–	227	34,352
Mississauga South	ON	Lib	Lib	20,676	51.77%	10,537	26.38%	All	58.1%	20,676	10,139	–	1,636	6,903	516	–	–	67	39,937
Mississauga West	ON	Lib	Lib	31,260	63.20%	20,678	41.81%	All	55.0%	31,260	10,582	–	1,532	5,275	810	–	–	–	49,459
Nepean—Carleton	ON	Lib	Lib	24,570	41.16%	2,260	3.79%	All	67.7%	24,570	22,310	–	2,223	9,536	805	–	–	249	59,693
Niagara Centre	ON	Lib	Lib	21,641	45.74%	8,328	17.60%	All	61.3%	21,641	13,313	–	7,029	4,893	–	–	–	439	47,315
Niagara Falls	ON	Lib	Lib	17,907	45.92%	5,908	15.15%	All	57.1%	17,907	11,999	–	2,356	6,077	501	–	–	155	38,995
Nickel Belt	ON	Lib	Lib	19,187	55.57%	11,883	34.42%	NDP	60.0%	19,187	6,370	–	7,304	1,664	–	–	–	–	34,525
Nipissing	ON	Lib	Lib	18,888	57.04%	11,427	34.51%	All	57.6%	18,888	7,461	–	2,572	4,192	–	–	–	–	33,113
Northumberland	ON	Lib	Lib	20,109	45.90%	8,699	19.86%	All	59.8%	20,109	11,410	–	2,141	8,768	1,102	–	–	276	43,806
Oak Ridges	ON	Lib	Lib	33,058	59.41%	21,344	38.36%	All	56.3%	33,058	11,714	–	1,623	8,409	672	–	–	172	55,648
Oakville	ON	Lib	Lib	23,074	47.74%	9,530	19.72%	All	63.4%	23,074	13,544	–	1,335	9,589	790	–	–	–	48,332
Oshawa	ON	Lib	Lib	16,179	42.92%	5,316	14.10%	All	49.9%	16,179	10,863	–	4,203	5,675	–	679	–	97	37,696
Ottawa Centre	ON	Lib	Lib	22,716	40.01%	9,200	16.20%	NDP	61.0%	22,716	10,167	–	13,516	7,505	1,531	813	–	526	56,774
Ottawa South	ON	Lib	Lib	26,585	51.33%	13,908	26.85%	All	62.0%	26,585	12,677	–	3,463	8,096	–	679	–	290	51,790
Ottawa West—Nepean	ON	Lib	Lib	22,606	43.32%	7,853	15.05%	All	62.8%	22,606	14,753	–	2,718	10,507	585	423	89	504	52,185
Ottawa—Orléans	ON	Lib	Lib	26,635	51.01%	13,319	25.51%	All	66.8%	26,635	13,316	–	2,169	8,738	561	534	–	266	52,219
Ottawa—Vanier	ON	Lib	Lib	26,749	55.56%	19,149	39.78%	All	56.9%	26,749	7,600	–	4,194	7,400	1,083	728	–	387	48,141
Oxford	ON	Lib	Lib	15,181	35.55%	2,131	4.99%	PC	61.3%	15,181	11,455	–	2,254	13,050	–	–	536	227	42,703
Parkdale—High Park	ON	Lib	Lib	20,676	49.41%	12,729	30.42%	NDP	58.2%	20,676	4,882	–	7,947	5,681	1,161	775	132	594	41,848
Parry Sound—Muskoka	ON	Lib	Lib	17,911	47.52%	8,342	22.13%	All	58.7%	17,911	9,569	–	1,665	7,055	1,495	–	–	–	37,695
Perth—Middlesex	ON	Lib	Lib	16,988	40.37%	5,443	12.94%	PC	61.2%	16,988	9,785	–	2,800	11,545	689	–	141	128	42,076
Peterborough	ON	Lib	Lib	25,310	48.41%	10,386	19.86%	All	60.8%	25,310	14,924	–	3,967	7,034	903	–	147	–	52,285
Pickering—Ajax—Uxbridge	ON	Lib	Lib	28,834	57.44%	16,893	33.65%	All	58.8%	28,834	11,941	–	1,523	6,883	1,014	–	–	–	50,195
Prince Edward—Hastings	ON	Lib	Lib	20,055	50.46%	10,348	26.04%	All	56.3%	20,055	9,707	–	1,897	8,083	–	–	–	–	39,742
Renfrew—Nipissing—Pembroke	ON	Lib	All	20,634	44.18%	2,423	5.19%	Lib	64.1%	18,211	20,634	–	1,607	5,287	–	762	121	78	46,700
Sarnia—Lambton	ON	Lib	Lib	19,329	50.97%	8,121	21.42%	All	59.7%	19,329	11,208	–	2,735	3,320	514	–	545	269	37,920
Sault Ste. Marie	ON	Lib	Lib	18,867	50.79%	9,665	26.02%	NDP	63.8%	18,867	7,006	–	9,202	1,168	776	–	–	128	37,147
Scarborough Centre	ON	Lib	Lib	26,969	67.51%	18,120	45.36%	All	54.2%	26,969	8,849	–	3,171	–	–	959	–	–	39,948
Scarborough East	ON	Lib	Lib	24,019	59.82%	16,460	41.00%	All	55.9%	24,019	7,559	–	1,884	6,284	–	–	–	405	40,151
Scarborough Southwest	ON	Lib	Lib	21,466	60.01%	16,215	45.33%	PC	53.4%	21,466	4,912	–	3,638	5,251	–	–	–	501	35,768
Scarborough—Agincourt	ON	Lib	Lib	26,986	70.89%	21,886	57.49%	All	54.7%	26,986	5,100	–	1,499	4,030	–	–	–	453	38,068
Scarborough—Rouge River	ON	Lib	Lib	28,669	79.05%	25,432	70.13%	All	50.5%	28,669	3,237	–	1,793	2,566	–	–	–	–	36,265
Simcoe North	ON	Lib	Lib	24,510	50.76%	10,227	21.18%	All	60.3%	24,510	14,283	–	2,272	6,914	–	–	305	–	48,284
Simcoe—Grey	ON	Lib	Lib	22,224	44.77%	6,111	12.31%	All	59.7%	22,224	16,113	–	1,646	8,655	–	–	246	751	49,635
St. Catharines	ON	Lib	Lib	20,992	44.93%	5,121	10.96%	All	60.0%	20,992	15,871	–	2,878	6,522	–	–	166	296	46,725
St. Paul's	ON	Lib	Lib	25,358	54.01%	15,259	32.50%	PC	59.2%	25,358	5,457	–	4,451	10,099	769	514	–	299	46,947
Stoney Creek	ON	Lib	Lib	24,150	51.08%	10,796	22.84%	All	60.9%	24,150	13,354	–	3,083	6,102	–	–	–	587	47,276
Stormont—Dundas—Charlottenburgh	ON	Lib	Lib	19,113	46.69%	2,962	7.24%	All	61.0%	19,113	16,151	–	1,696	3,635	–	–	–	341	40,936
Sudbury	ON	Lib	Lib	20,290	58.52%	13,736	39.62%	All	54.3%	20,290	6,554	–	4,368	2,642	503	–	–	313	34,670
Thornhill	ON	Lib	Lib	27,152	64.59%	20,509	48.78%	All	57.2%	27,152	6,643	–	1,653	6,338	–	–	–	254	42,040
Thunder Bay—Atikokan	ON	Lib	Lib	11,449	36.98%	2,382	7.69%	All	55.7%	11,449	9,067	–	6,023	3,652	769	–	–	–	30,960
Thunder Bay—Superior North	ON	Lib	Lib	15,241	48.12%	8,963	28.30%	All	57.2%	15,241	6,278	–	6,169	2,753	648	581	–	–	31,670
Timiskaming—Cochrane	ON	Lib	Lib	19,404	62.40%	13,564	43.62%	All	58.7%	19,404	5,840	–	2,461	2,603	790	–	–	–	31,098
Timmins—James Bay	ON	Lib	Lib	16,335	54.22%	6,950	23.07%	NDP	56.1%	16,335	3,356	–	9,385	1,053	–	–	–	–	30,129
Toronto Centre—Rosedale	ON	Lib	Lib	26,203	55.33%	18,054	38.12%	PC	57.2%	26,203	5,058	–	5,300	8,149	–	722	–	1,927 (Note: Former Liberal Cabinet minister Paul Hellyer, standing for the Canadian Action Party, received 1,466 votes.)	47,359
Toronto—Danforth	ON	Lib	Lib	20,330	51.90%	9,500	24.25%	NDP	57.2%	20,330	3,021	–	10,830	3,138	769	513	–	567	39,168
Trinity—Spadina	ON	Lib	Lib	20,032	47.56%	4,031	9.57%	NDP	57.9%	20,032	2,250	–	16,001	2,309	562	673	–	290	42,117
Vaughan—King—Aurora	ON	Lib	Lib	38,208	67.22%	28,451	50.06%	All	57.9%	38,208	9,757	–	1,938	6,551	–	–	384	–	56,838
Waterloo—Wellington	ON	Lib	Lib	19,619	43.66%	4,822	10.73%	All	58.1%	19,619	14,797	–	1,845	7,999	432	–	249	–	44,941
Whitby—Ajax	ON	Lib	Lib	25,693	52.68%	12,534	25.70%	All	58.6%	25,693	13,159	–	2,359	7,563	–	–	–	–	48,774
Willowdale	ON	Lib	Lib	27,038	61.27%	19,627	44.47%	All	56.9%	27,038	7,411	–	2,404	7,134	–	–	–	145	44,132
Windsor West	ON	Lib	Lib	20,729	54.21%	11,952	31.26%	All	50.0%	20,729	8,777	–	6,080	2,116	–	–	304	229	38,235
Windsor—St. Clair	ON	Lib	NDP	17,001	40.84%	401	0.96%	Lib	55.6%	16,600	5,639	–	17,001	1,906	390	–	–	95	41,631
York Centre	ON	Lib	Lib	24,788	71.09%	20,173	57.86%	All	54.0%	24,788	4,615	–	2,109	2,518	532	–	–	305	34,867
York North	ON	Lib	Lib	22,665	46.50%	10,680	21.91%	All	57.4%	22,665	11,985	–	1,696	11,890	–	–	509	–	48,745
York South—Weston	ON	Ind	Lib	15,841	45.60%	1,497	4.31%	Ind	56.5%	15,841 (Note: Alan Tonks was previously Chairman of the Municipality of Metropolitan Toronto (1987-1997))	1,754	–	1,288	986	293	–	14,344	232	34,738
York West	ON	Lib	Lib	19,768	77.28%	17,034	66.59%	All	47.9%	19,768	2,734	–	2,365	–	–	539	–	175	25,581
Cardigan	PE	Lib	Lib	8,545	48.06%	276	1.55%	PC	79.2%	8,545	500	–	465	8,269	–	–	–	–	17,779
Egmont	PE	Lib	Lib	9,227	50.05%	2,111	11.45%	PC	72.8%	9,227	952	–	1,139	7,116	–	–	–	–	18,434
Hillsborough	PE	Lib	Lib	8,277	41.81%	2,238	11.30%	PC	67.2%	8,277	1,005	–	4,328	6,039	–	–	58	92	19,799
Malpeque	PE	Lib	Lib	8,972	48.62%	1,786	9.68%	PC	73.2%	8,972	1,262	–	782	7,186	250	–	–	–	18,452
Abitibi—Baie-James—Nunavik	QC	Lib	Lib	18,198	49.99%	2,631	7.23%	BQ	56.5%	18,198	1,297	15,567	534	809	–	–	–	–	36,405
Ahuntsic	QC	Lib	Lib	28,643	53.89%	11,511	21.66%	BQ	67.0%	28,643	1,816	17,132	997	3,018	1,123	–	–	421	53,150
Anjou—Rivière-des-Prairies	QC	Lib	Lib	28,134	57.86%	13,379	27.52%	BQ	66.6%	28,134	2,005	14,755	624	2,034	–	918	–	151	48,621
Argenteuil—Papineau—Mirabel	QC	BQ	BQ	21,713	43.20%	542	1.08%	Lib	63.7%	21,171	2,897	21,713	550	1,848	723	934	167	256	50,259
Bas-Richelieu—Nicolet—Bécancour	QC	BQ	BQ	25,266	56.92%	11,485	25.87%	Lib	67.3%	13,781	2,078	25,266	421	1,944	–	901	–	–	44,391
Beauce	QC	Lib	Lib	26,033	56.01%	13,710	29.49%	BQ	63.3%	26,033	5,452	12,323	436	1,628	–	–	–	611	46,483
Beauharnois—Salaberry	QC	BQ	Lib	23,834	48.26%	2,896	5.86%	BQ	70.4%	23,834	1,782	20,938	703	2,133	–	–	–	–	49,390
Beauport—Montmorency—Côte-de-Beaupré—Île-d'Orléans	QC	BQ	BQ	21,341	41.55%	2,627	5.11%	Lib	65.9%	18,714	5,878	21,341	869	2,916	–	1,364	–	283	51,365
Bellechasse—Etchemins—Montmagny—L'Islet	QC	Lib	Lib	19,163	47.91%	4,190	10.48%	BQ	63.8%	19,163	4,224	14,973	–	1,636	–	–	–	–	39,996
Berthier—Montcalm	QC	BQ	BQ	31,647	57.06%	14,978	27.00%	Lib	61.1%	16,669	2,851	31,647	823	2,011	–	1,464	–	–	55,465
Bonaventure—Gaspé—Îles-de-la-Madeleine—Pabok	QC	BQ	Lib	19,213	53.19%	3,681	10.19%	BQ	65.4%	19,213	764	15,532	613	–	–	–	–	–	36,122
Bourassa	QC	Lib	Lib	25,403	62.22%	13,941	34.15%	BQ	62.3%	25,403	1,435	11,462	736	1,325	–	–	–	467	40,828
Brome—Missisquoi	QC	Lib	Lib	21,545	50.26%	8,182	19.09%	BQ	65.7%	21,545	1,977	13,363	480	5,502	–	–	–	–	42,867
Brossard—La Prairie	QC	Lib	Lib	26,806	52.69%	10,048	19.75%	BQ	66.1%	26,806	2,973	16,758	852	2,783	–	–	–	700	50,872
Chambly	QC	BQ	BQ	26,084	49.94%	8,684	16.63%	Lib	66.5%	17,400	2,780	26,084	769	3,448	–	1,751	–	–	52,232
Champlain	QC	BQ	BQ	20,423	45.26%	15	0.03%	Lib	68.1%	20,408	2,599	20,423	672	–	–	1,020	–	–	45,122
Charlesbourg—Jacques-Cartier	QC	BQ	BQ	21,867	38.29%	822	1.44%	Lib	68.1%	21,045	8,801	21,867	1,000	3,256	1,136	–	–	–	57,105
Charlevoix	QC	BQ	BQ	20,479	61.44%	11,171	33.52%	Lib	58.3%	9,308	1,905	20,479	484	1,154	–	–	–	–	33,330
Châteauguay	QC	BQ	BQ	26,284	47.12%	3,312	5.94%	Lib	67.3%	22,972	3,120	26,284	622	2,041	–	–	–	743	55,782
Chicoutimi—Le Fjord	QC	PC	Lib	20,105	48.24%	5,032	12.07%	BQ	64.2%	20,105	2,001	15,073	698	–	–	–	3,797	–	41,674
Compton—Stanstead	QC	PC	Lib	17,729	46.56%	2,921	7.67%	BQ	65.6%	17,729	2,061	14,808	580	2,422	–	–	–	476	38,076
Drummond	QC	BQ	BQ	18,970	45.27%	4,635	11.06%	Lib	65.6%	14,335	1,621	18,970	423	6,559	–	–	–	–	41,908
Frontenac—Mégantic	QC	BQ	Lib	17,069	45.95%	1,366	3.68%	BQ	69.4%	17,069	1,751	15,703	427	1,497	–	698	–	–	37,145
Gatineau	QC	Lib	Lib	25,960	51.45%	13,143	26.05%	BQ	56.5%	25,960	5,069	12,817	1,763	3,619	–	–	617	611	50,456
Hochelaga—Maisonneuve	QC	BQ	BQ	21,250	49.20%	5,107	11.82%	Lib	58.7%	16,143	1,502	21,250	767	1,751	–	1,227	–	549	43,189
Hull—Aylmer	QC	Lib	Lib	22,385	51.40%	12,334	28.32%	BQ	59.1%	22,385	3,639	10,051	1,521	4,181	–	892	184	699	43,552
Joliette	QC	BQ	BQ	23,615	52.20%	8,795	19.44%	Lib	64.4%	14,820	2,432	23,615	1,085	2,730	–	–	–	560	45,242
Jonquière	QC	BQ	BQ	16,189	50.07%	4,615	14.27%	Lib	62.3%	11,574	3,428	16,189	1,139	–	–	–	–	–	32,330
Kamouraska—Rivière-du-Loup—Temiscouata—Les-Basques	QC	BQ	BQ	23,319	59.99%	11,525	29.65%	Lib	59.4%	11,794	1,373	23,319	836	1,382	–	–	–	170	38,874
Lac-Saint-Jean—Saguenay	QC	BQ	BQ	21,391	66.17%	13,855	42.86%	Lib	62.8%	7,536	1,536	21,391	417	535	–	–	912	–	32,327
Lac-Saint-Louis	QC	Lib	Lib	43,515	74.16%	39,104	66.64%	PC	71.7%	43,515	4,223	3,913	1,464	4,411	–	1,031	–	119	58,676
LaSalle—Émard	QC	Lib	Lib	32,069	65.75%	20,264	41.55%	BQ	65.6%	32,069	1,806	11,805	837	1,111	–	765	–	380	48,773
Laurentides	QC	BQ	BQ	30,337	49.90%	6,718	11.05%	Lib	62.5%	23,619	2,269	30,337	720	3,094	–	–	–	757	60,796
Laurier—Sainte-Marie	QC	BQ	BQ	23,473	52.79%	12,022	27.04%	Lib	57.7%	11,451	960	23,473	2,111	1,879	2,169	2,156	–	269	44,468
Laval Centre	QC	BQ	BQ	23,746	43.35%	42	0.08%	Lib	64.5%	23,704	2,437	23,746	832	2,778	1,285	–	–	–	54,782
Laval East	QC	BQ	Lib	26,018	44.77%	1,292	2.22%	BQ	68.8%	26,018	2,354	24,726	573	2,459	660	892	255	178	58,115
Laval West	QC	Lib	Lib	31,758	51.30%	11,783	19.03%	BQ	68.0%	31,758	4,631	19,975	764	3,613	983	–	–	180	61,904
Lévis-et-Chutes-de-la-Chaudière	QC	BQ	BQ	26,398	41.85%	4,876	7.73%	Lib	66.4%	21,522	9,152	26,398	1,411	4,222	–	–	–	374	63,079
Longueuil	QC	BQ	BQ	20,868	52.25%	7,877	19.72%	Lib	59.7%	12,991	2,066	20,868	655	2,210	–	968	–	183	39,941
Lotbinière—L'Érable	QC	BQ	BQ	15,351	45.64%	2,788	8.29%	Lib	66.4%	12,563	2,827	15,351	538	2,357	–	–	–	–	33,636
Louis-Hébert	QC	BQ	Lib	23,695	41.14%	2,455	4.26%	BQ	70.8%	23,695	5,887	21,240	1,200	5,189	–	–	–	382	57,593
Manicouagan	QC	BQ	BQ	11,595	53.24%	3,825	17.56%	Lib	56.0%	7,770	1,197	11,595	386	830	–	–	–	–	21,778
Matapédia—Matane	QC	BQ	BQ	14,678	46.64%	276	0.88%	Lib	58.8%	14,402	–	14,678	935	1,456	–	–	–	–	31,471
Mercier	QC	BQ	BQ	24,755	52.87%	9,339	19.95%	Lib	63.3%	15,416	1,684	24,755	480	1,629	1,813	937	–	104	46,818
Mount Royal	QC	Lib	Lib	33,118	81.24%	30,629	75.13%	PC	59.9%	33,118	1,444	1,740	1,034	2,489	681	–	–	262	40,768
Notre-Dame-de-Grâce—Lachine	QC	Lib	Lib	28,328	60.72%	19,879	42.61%	BQ	62.6%	28,328	2,022	8,449	2,208	3,352	1,031	897	–	364	46,651
Outremont	QC	Lib	Lib	18,796	47.68%	7,645	19.39%	BQ	58.9%	18,796	1,283	11,151	2,199	3,190	1,478	1,013	–	312	39,422
Papineau—Saint-Denis	QC	Lib	Lib	23,955	54.10%	12,176	27.50%	BQ	61.9%	23,955	2,114	11,779	1,983	1,215	1,128	886	738	482	44,280
Pierrefonds—Dollard	QC	Lib	Lib	39,357	72.85%	33,420	61.86%	BQ	68.2%	39,357	3,481	5,937	1,109	2,991	–	1,149	–	–	54,024
Pontiac—Gatineau—Labelle	QC	Lib	Lib	20,590	45.36%	6,038	13.30%	BQ	58.9%	20,590	6,587	14,552	840	1,791	654	–	98	277	45,389
Portneuf	QC	BQ	Lib	17,877	40.78%	2,433	5.55%	BQ	65.3%	17,877	6,699	15,444	–	3,819	–	–	–	–	43,839
Québec	QC	BQ	BQ	22,793	43.43%	4,174	7.95%	Lib	61.2%	18,619	3,980	22,793	1,704	3,171	–	1,480	–	737	52,484
Quebec East	QC	BQ	Lib	21,813	38.61%	647	1.15%	BQ	64.2%	21,813	8,594	21,166	1,192	3,727	–	–	–	–	56,492
Repentigny	QC	BQ	BQ	33,627	57.80%	17,992	30.93%	Lib	63.5%	15,635	2,964	33,627	831	3,122	–	1,997	–	–	58,176
Richmond—Arthabaska	QC	PC	PC	18,430	37.20%	363	0.73%	BQ	66.4%	10,416	1,930	18,067	319	18,430	–	–	–	375	49,537
Rimouski—Neigette-et-La-Mitis	QC	BQ	BQ	19,759	59.55%	9,964	30.03%	Lib	60.0%	9,795	1,280	19,759	525	1,150	–	–	–	673	33,182
Rivière-des-Mille-Îles	QC	BQ	BQ	26,508	49.41%	8,052	15.01%	Lib	63.8%	18,456	3,677	26,508	739	2,935	1,329	–	–	–	53,644
Roberval	QC	BQ	BQ	16,928	55.06%	6,248	20.32%	Lib	58.4%	10,680	1,830	16,928	437	870	–	–	–	–	30,745
Rosemont—Petite-Patrie	QC	BQ	BQ	23,315	49.13%	7,263	15.31%	Lib	59.3%	16,052	1,354	23,315	1,417	2,006	1,475	1,486	114	233	47,452
Saint-Bruno—Saint-Hubert	QC	BQ	BQ	22,217	43.98%	2,474	4.90%	Lib	67.5%	19,743	3,305	22,217	1,029	2,673	–	1,546	–	–	50,513
Saint-Hyacinthe—Bagot	QC	BQ	BQ	25,916	55.41%	9,651	20.63%	Lib	67.6%	16,265	2,161	25,916	499	1,932	–	–	–	–	46,773
Saint-Jean	QC	BQ	BQ	22,686	47.44%	5,424	11.34%	Lib	68.7%	17,262	3,169	22,686	698	2,764	–	1,246	–	–	47,825
Saint-Lambert	QC	Lib	Lib	19,679	45.40%	3,160	7.29%	BQ	63.5%	19,679	3,066	16,519	–	2,704	–	1,377	–	–	43,345
Saint-Laurent—Cartierville	QC	Lib	Lib	32,861	73.58%	27,023	60.51%	BQ	63.1%	32,861	1,909	5,838	1,070	2,308	–	–	–	672	44,658
Saint-Léonard—Saint-Michel	QC	Lib	Lib	35,396	76.66%	28,717	62.20%	BQ	63.7%	35,396	1,750	6,679	528	1,057	–	635	–	127	46,172
Saint-Maurice	QC	Lib	Lib	23,345	54.07%	6,524	15.11%	BQ	72.5%	23,345	1,461	16,821	359	966	–	–	–	223	43,175
Shefford	QC	PC	Lib	20,707	45.93%	891	1.98%	BQ	67.5%	20,707	1,867	19,816	380	1,498	–	819	–	–	45,087
Sherbrooke	QC	PC	BQ	23,559	46.53%	2,377	4.69%	Lib	63.6%	21,182	2,284	23,559	677	1,955	–	–	294	681	50,632
Témiscamingue	QC	BQ	BQ	18,801	50.14%	2,773	7.40%	Lib	62.4%	16,028	1,368	18,801	493	804	–	–	–	–	37,494
Terrebonne—Blainville	QC	BQ	BQ	28,933	51.91%	11,265	20.21%	Lib	64.8%	17,668	3,741	28,933	1,111	3,089	–	–	–	1,193	55,735
Trois-Rivières	QC	BQ	BQ	22,405	46.67%	1,799	3.75%	Lib	66.3%	20,606	2,161	22,405	512	1,599	–	–	–	722	48,005
Vaudreuil—Soulanges	QC	Lib	Lib	26,292	51.56%	8,705	17.07%	BQ	70.0%	26,292	4,188	17,587	904	2,020	–	–	–	–	50,991
Verchères—Les Patriotes	QC	BQ	BQ	28,696	52.29%	11,956	21.78%	Lib	69.1%	16,740	2,870	28,696	1,074	3,859	–	1,643	–	–	54,882
Verdun—Saint-Henri—Saint-Paul—Pointe Saint-Charles	QC	Lib	Lib	20,905	51.27%	8,929	21.90%	BQ	59.0%	20,905	2,098	11,976	1,003	2,670	933	924	117	148	40,774
Westmount—Ville-Marie	QC	Lib	Lib	23,093	60.19%	18,496	48.21%	PC	54.7%	23,093	1,697	4,110	1,990	4,597	1,245	692	694	246	38,364
Battlefords—Lloydminster	SK	Ref	All	17,691	60.23%	12,584	42.85%	NDP	59.9%	5,098	17,691	–	5,107	1,474	–	–	–	–	29,370
Blackstrap	SK	Ref	All	16,028	44.24%	6,477	17.88%	NDP	65.8%	8,206	16,028	–	9,551	1,926	519	–	–	–	36,230
Churchill River	SK	NDP	Lib	9,856	41.81%	2,177	9.23%	All	59.5%	9,856	7,679	–	5,141	755	–	–	–	143	23,574
Cypress Hills—Grasslands	SK	Ref	All	18,593	61.65%	13,492	44.73%	NDP	64.9%	3,791	18,593	–	5,101	2,676	–	–	–	–	30,161
Palliser	SK	NDP	NDP	12,136	38.16%	209	0.66%	All	62.7%	6,492	11,927	–	12,136	1,248	–	–	–	–	31,803
Prince Albert	SK	Ref	All	14,825	45.59%	8,071	24.82%	Lib	64.1%	6,754	14,825	–	6,676	3,943	317	–	–	–	32,515
Regina—Lumsden—Lake Centre	SK	NDP	All	12,585	42.94%	161	0.55%	NDP	63.2%	4,296	12,585	–	12,424	–	–	–	–	–	29,305
Regina—Qu'Appelle	SK	NDP	NDP	11,731	41.30%	164	0.58%	All	61.1%	5,106	11,567	–	11,731	–	–	–	–	–	28,404
Saskatoon—Humboldt	SK	Ref	All	15,780	44.28%	6,360	17.85%	NDP	64.0%	7,740	15,780	–	9,420	1,963	488	–	–	245	35,636
Saskatoon—Rosetown—Biggar	SK	NDP	All	11,177	41.66%	68	0.25%	NDP	55.6%	3,023	11,177	–	11,109	1,518	–	–	–	–	26,827
Saskatoon—Wanuskewin	SK	Ref	All	17,404	52.57%	9,382	28.34%	NDP	61.6%	5,567	17,404	–	8,022	1,709	402	–	–	–	33,104
Souris—Moose Mountain	SK	Ref	All	19,278	63.28%	14,523	47.67%	NDP	63.0%	4,371	19,278	–	4,755	2,060	–	–	–	–	30,464
Wascana	SK	Lib	Lib	14,244	41.19%	1,752	5.07%	All	62.3%	14,244	12,492	–	7,446	–	–	–	–	401	34,583
Yorkton—Melville	SK	Ref	All	19,978	62.98%	14,825	46.74%	Lib	63.6%	5,153	19,978	–	5,007	1,583	–	–	–	–	31,721
Nunavut	Terr	Lib	Lib	5,327	69.01%	3,917	50.74%	NDP	54.1%	5,327	–	–	1,410	633	349	–	–	–	7,719
Western Arctic	Terr	Lib	Lib	5,855	45.60%	2,425	18.89%	NDP	52.2%	5,855	2,273	–	3,430	1,282	–	–	–	–	12,840
Yukon	Terr	NDP	Lib	4,293	32.48%	70	0.53%	NDP	63.5%	4,293	3,659	–	4,223	991	–	–	53	–	13,219

= Open seat
= Turnout is above provincial average
= Winning candidate held seat in previous House
= Incumbent had switched allegiance
= Previously incumbent in another riding
= Not incumbent; was previously elected to the House
= Incumbency arose from byelection gain
= Other incumbents renominated
= Previously a member of one of the provincial legislatures
= Multiple candidates

=== Summary analysis ===
Party candidates in 2nd place
Party in 1st place	Party in 2nd place						Total
Party in 1st place	Lib	All	BQ	NDP	PC	Ind	Total
Liberal		94	33	16	27	2	172
Alliance	51			9	6		66
Bloc Québécois	38						38
New Democratic	9	4					13
Progressive Conservative	9	2	1				12
Total	107	100	34	25	33	2	301

Principal races, according to 1st and 2nd-place results
Parties		Seats
█ Liberal	█ Alliance	145
█ Liberal	█ Bloc Québécois	71
█ Liberal	█ Progressive Conservative	36
█ Liberal	█ New Democratic	25
█ Alliance	█ New Democratic	13
█ Alliance	█ Progressive Conservative	8
█ Liberal	█ Independent	2
█ Progressive Conservative	█ Bloc Québécois	1
Total		301

Candidates ranked 1st to 5th place, by party
Parties	1st	2nd	3rd	4th	5th
█ Liberal	172	107	22		
█ Alliance	66	100	79	48	2
█ Bloc Québécois	38	34	2	1	
█ New Democratic	13	25	56	136	36
█ Progressive Conservative	12	33	139	101	5
█ Independent		2	1	3	20
█ Green			2	2	89
█ Marijuana				5	37
█ Communist				2	5
█ Canadian Action				1	19
█ Natural Law					17
█ Marxist–Leninist					8

=== Vote and seat summaries ===
Ternary plots - shift of electoral support (1997-2000)
1997

2000
Electoral districts identified by colours of winning parties

Changes in popular vote and seats by party (2000 vs 1997)
Party	Popular vote			Seats		
Party	2000	1997	Change (pp)	1997	2000	±
█ Liberal	40.85%	38.46%	2.39	155	172 / 301	17▲
█ Alliance	25.49%	19.35%	6.14	60	66 / 301	6▲
█ Progressive Conservative	12.19%	18.84%	-6.65	20	12 / 301	8▼
█ Bloc Québécois	10.72%	10.67%	0.05	44	38 / 301	6▼
█ New Democratic	8.51%	11.05%	-2.54	21	13 / 301	8▼
█ Other	2.24%	1.63%	0.61	1	–	1▼

=== Results by province ===
Party name		BC	AB	SK	MB	ON	QC	NB	NS	PE	NL	NU	NT	YK	Total
Liberal	Seats:	5	2	2	5	100	36	6	4	4	5	1	1	1	172
Liberal	Popular vote:	27.7	20.9	20.7	32.5	51.5	44.2	41.7	36.5	47.0	44.9	69.0	45.3	32.9	40.8
Canadian Alliance	Seats:	27	23	10	4	2	-	-	-	-	-		-	-	66
Canadian Alliance	Vote:	49.4	58.9	47.7	30.4	23.6	6.2	15.7	9.6	5.0	3.9		17.6	27.0	25.5
Bloc Québécois	Seats:						38								38
Bloc Québécois	Vote:						39.9								10.7
New Democratic	Seats:	2	-	2	4	1	-	1	3	-	-	-	-	-	13
New Democratic	Vote:	11.3	5.4	26.2	20.9	8.3	1.8	11.7	24.0	9.0	13.1	18.3	26.9	32.1	8.5
Progressive Conservative	Seats:	-	1	-	1	-	1	3	4	-	2	-	-	-	12
Progressive Conservative	Vote:	7.3	13.5	4.8	14.5	14.4	5.6	30.5	29.1	38.4	34.5	8.1	10.1	7.6	12.2
Total seats:		34	26	14	14	103	75	10	11	4	7	1	1	1	301
Parties that won no seats:
Green	Vote:	2.1	0.5	0.4	0.2	0.9	0.6		0.1	0.3		4.5			0.8
Marijuana	Vote:	0.7	0.2		0.1	0.3	1.0	0.1	0.4						0.5
Canadian Action	Vote:	0.8	0.1	0.2	0.2	0.2									0.2
Natural Law	Vote:	0.1				0.1	0.3	0.2		0.1	0.1				0.1
Marxist–Leninist	Vote:	0.1				0.1	0.2		0.1						0.1
Communist	Vote:	0.1			0.3	0.1	0.1								0.1
Other	Vote:	0.4	0.4		1.0	0.6	0.2		0.2	0.1	4.4			0.4	0.4

Source: Elections Canada

=== Gains and losses ===
Elections to the 37th Parliament of Canada – seats won/lost by party, 1997–2000
Party	1997	Gain from (loss to)												2000
Party	1997	Lib		All		BQ		NDP		PC		Ind		2000
Liberal	155				(4)	7		6	(1)	8		1		172
Alliance	60	4						3			(1)			66
Bloc Québécois	44		(7)							1				38
New Democratic	21	1	(6)		(3)									13
Progressive Conservative	20		(8)	1			(1)							12
Independent	1		(1)											–
Total	301	5	(22)	1	(7)	7	(1)	9	(1)	9	(1)	1	–	301

The following seats changed allegiance from the 1997 election:

Liberal to Alliance

- Lanark—Carleton
- Provencher
- Renfrew—Nipissing—Pembroke
- Richmond

Liberal to NDP

- Windsor—St. Clair

Alliance to PC

- Calgary Centre

Bloc to Liberal

- Beauharnois—Salaberry
- Bonaventure—Gaspé—Îles-de-la-Madeleine—Pabok
- Frontenac—Mégantic
- Laval East
- Louis-Hébert
- Portneuf
- Quebec East

NDP to Liberal

- Beauséjour—Petitcodiac
- Bras d'Or—Cape Breton
- Churchill River
- Halifax West
- Sydney—Victoria
- Yukon

NDP to Alliance

- Kamloops, Thompson and Highland Valleys
- Regina—Lumsden—Lake Centre
- Saskatoon—Rosetown—Biggar

PC to Liberal

- Burin—St. George's
- Chicoutimi
- Compton—Stanstead
- Madawaska—Restigouche
- Markham
- Shefford
- Tobique—Mactaquac
- West Nova

PC to Bloc

- Sherbrooke

Independent to Liberal

- York South—Weston

=== Notes ===
- Number of parties: 11
  - First appearance: Marijuana Party of Canada
  - Reappearance after hiatus: Communist Party of Canada
  - Final appearance: Natural Law Party of Canada, Progressive Conservative Party of Canada
  - First-and-only appearance: Canadian Alliance

=== 10 closest ridings ===
1.Champlain, QC: Marcel Gagnon (BQ) def. Julie Boulet (Lib) by 15 votes
2.Laval Centre, QC: Madeleine Dalphond-Guiral (BQ) def. Pierre Lafleur (Lib) by 42 votes
3.Leeds—Grenville, ON: Joe Jordan (Lib) def. Gord Brown (CA) by 55 votes
4.Saskatoon—Rosetown—Biggar, SK: Carol Skelton (CA) def. Dennis Gruending (NDP) by 68 votes
5.Yukon, YT: Larry Bagnell (Lib) def. Louise Hardy (NDP) by 70 votes
6.Tobique—Mactaquac, NB: Andy Savoy (Lib) def. Gilles Bernier (PC) by 150 votes
7.Regina—Lumsden—Lake Centre, SK: Larry Spencer (CA) def. John Solomon (NDP) by 161 votes
8.Regina—Qu'Appelle, SK: Lorne Nystrom (NDP) def. Don Leier (CA) by 164 votes
9.Palliser, SK: Dick Proctor (NDP) def. Don Findlay (CA) by 209 votes
10.Matapédia—Matane, QC: Jean-Yves Roy (BQ) def. Marc Bélanger (Lib) by 276 votes
11.Cardigan, PE: Lawrence MacAulay (Lib) def. Kevin MacAdam (PC) by 276 votes

== See also ==
- List of Canadian federal general elections
- List of political parties in Canada
- Results of the 2000 Canadian federal election by riding

Articles on parties' candidates in this election:

- Marxist-Leninists
- Canadian Action
- Canadian Alliance
- Communists
- Liberals
- Natural Law
- New Democrats
- Progressive Conservatives
- Christian Heritage
