= Opinion polling for the 2000 Canadian federal election =

Polls leading up to the 2000 Canadian federal election.

== National polls ==
Voter intentions in the campaign for the 2000 Canadian federal election Liberal Party of Canada Progressive Conservative Party of Canada Bloc Québécois New Democratic Party of Canada Canadian Alliance

Voter intentions in years before the 2000 Canadian federal election Liberal Party of Canada Progressive Conservative Party of Canada Bloc Québécois New Democratic Party of Canada Canadian Alliance (2000–2000) Reform Party (1997–2000)

=== Campaign period ===
Evolution of voting intentions at national level
Last day of survey	LPC	CA	PC	BQ	NDP	GPC	Other	Polling firm	Sample	ME	Source
Voting result	40.85	25.49	12.19	10.72	8.51	0.81	1.43				
November 26, 2000	41	26	12	10	9	—N/a	1	Environics	—N/a	—N/a	HTML
November 25, 2000	43	25	11	10	9	—N/a	3	Léger	2,514	± 2.3	PDF
November 23, 2000	39	27	12	10	10	1	1	Ipsos	4,102	± 1.5	PDF
November 23, 2000	41	25	12	10	9	—N/a	4	Compass	1,032	± 3.2	HTML
November 23, 2000	41	27	14	7	8	—N/a	3	Zogby	—N/a	—N/a	PDF
November 23, 2000	43	25	11	10	9	—N/a	—N/a	Léger	—N/a	—N/a	PDF
November 23, 2000	41	25	12	10	9	—N/a	—N/a	Compass	—N/a	—N/a	PDF
November 22, 2000	43	25	11	9	9	—N/a	2	Ekos	3,910	—N/a	PDF
November 22, 2000	45	24	13	10	7	—N/a	—N/a	Environics	—N/a	—N/a	PDF
November 21, 2000	39	24	12	13	10	—N/a	—N/a	Decima	—N/a	—N/a	PDF
November 21, 2000	39	27	12	11	9	—N/a	3	Compass	—N/a	—N/a	HTML
November 16, 2000	46	25	10	10	9	—N/a	0	Léger	2,213	± 2.2	
November 15, 2000	43	26	10	10	9	—N/a	1	Ekos	2,455	± 2.0	PDF
November 14, 2000	46	23	10	11	9	—N/a	1	Environics	1,835	± 2.3	HTML
November 14, 2000	45	25	10	10	8	—N/a	1	Compass	—N/a	—N/a	HTML
November 11, 2000	43	27	8	11	10	0	1	Ipsos	2,552	± 2.0	PDF
November 10, 2000	43	24	8	12	8	—N/a	6	Compass	1,612	± 2.5	PDF
November 7, 2000	44	26	8	11	10	1	1	Ipsos	1,052	± 3.1	PDF
November 6, 2000	48	26	8	9	8	—N/a	1	Environics	1,857	± 2.3	
November 2, 2000	42	29	8	10	9	—N/a	2	Ipsos	—N/a	—N/a	PDF
October 30, 2000	45	29	7	10	7	—N/a	—N/a	Environics	1,339	± 2.7	PDF
October 26, 2000	47	28	8	9	7	—N/a	1	Ekos	—N/a	—N/a	PDF
October 26, 2000	44	24	10	9	10	—N/a	3	Decima	2,000	± 2.2	
October 25, 2000	44	27	8	10	8	—N/a	3	Compass	2,346	± 3.2	
October 25, 2000	45	28	8	9	8	—N/a	—N/a	Ipsos	1,502	± 2.5	
October 23, 2000	48	23	10	10	9	—N/a	1	Environics	2,019	± 2.2	HTML
October 22, 2000	48	21	8	10	8	—N/a	5	Léger	1,503	± 2.1	
Official call of federal elections (October 22, 2000)

=== During the 36th Parliament of Canada ===
Evolution of voting intentions at national level
Last day of survey	LPC	CA (Reform)	PC	BQ	NDP	GPC	Other	Polling firm	Sample	ME	Source
October 16, 2000	44	25	9	10	10	—N/a	1	Environics	2,028	± 2.2	HTML
October 12, 2000	52	20	8	10	8	—N/a	1	Ipsos	1,500	± 2.5	1 2
October 12, 2000	45	26	7	11	11	—N/a	0	Compass	—N/a	—N/a	HTML
October 7, 2000	50	19	11	9	8	—N/a	4	Ekos	2,502	± 2.0	PDF
September 27, 2000	44	25	9	10	9	—N/a	3	Ipsos	1,843	± 2.3	1 2
September 27, 2000	47	24	10	9	9	—N/a	1	Compass	—N/a	—N/a	HTML
August 24, 2000	46	22	10	10	10	—N/a	2	Angus Reid	1,500	± 2.5	PDF
August 12, 2000	43	25	10	11	10	—N/a	2	Angus Reid	1,500	± 2.5	1 2
August 6, 2000	47	23	10	9	11	—N/a	0	Ekos	1,505	± 2.6	
July 28, 2000	50	20	12	9	9	—N/a	0	Ekos	1,500	± 2.6	
July 26, 2000	45	24	10	10	11	—N/a	1	Angus Reid	1,503	± 2.5	1 2
July 17, 2000	48	18	13	9	9	—N/a	2	Ekos	2,492	± 2.0	
July 16, 2000	44	21	12	8	14	—N/a	1	Environics	—N/a	—N/a	HTML
Stockwell Day becomes the head of Canadian Alliance (July 8, 2000)
May 25, 2000	47	18	14	10	10	—N/a	2	Angus Reid	1,516	± 2.5	PDF
May 15, 2000	49	19	9	10	11	—N/a	—N/a	Ekos	1,482	± 2.6	
May 8, 2000	52	17	11	9	9	—N/a	—N/a	Ekos	3,530	± 1.6	
Creation of Canadian Alliance (March 27, 2000)
March 6, 2000	47	14	13	11	12	—N/a	2	Angus Reid	1,501	± 2.5	PDF
February 2, 2000	46	12	15	9	12	—N/a	6	Angus Reid	1,500	± 2.5	PDF
January 11, 2000	57	11	13	7	10	—N/a	—N/a	Gallup	1,007	± 3.1	PDF
November 22, 1999	54	9	20	7	10	—N/a	1	Gallup	1,007	± 3.1	PDF
November 1, 1999	50	12	13	13	10	—N/a	2	Environics	2,061	± 2.0	HTML
August 21, 1999	50	9	20	10	9	—N/a	—N/a	Gallup	1,014	± 3.1	PDF
July 19, 1999	52	7	23	9	7	—N/a	—N/a	Gallup	1,002	± 3.1	PDF
August 2, 1999	48	12	16	10	12	—N/a	2	Environics	2,018	± 2.0	HTML
June 19, 1999	53	8	20	9	9	—N/a	—N/a	Gallup	1,002	± 3.1	PDF
May 30, 1999	47	12	18	11	12	—N/a	—N/a	Angus Reid	1,500	± 2.5	PDF
April 18, 1999	54	10	15	9	10	—N/a	—N/a	Gallup	1,005	± 3.1	PDF
January 25, 1999	56	10	13	9	10	—N/a	2	Gallup	1,008	± 3.1	PDF
January 25, 1999	49	10	11	8	8	—N/a	—N/a	Ekos	4,000	± 2.0	PDF
January 3, 1999	49	12	12	—N/a	13	—N/a	—N/a	Environics	2,000	± 2.0	HTML
Joe Clark becomes head of Progressive Conservative Party (November 14, 1998)
November 1, 1998	47	14	17	10	11	—N/a	—N/a	Angus Reid	1,500	± 2.5	
October 25, 1998	49	13	13	—N/a	12	—N/a	—N/a	Environics	2,000	± 2.0	HTML
October 21, 1998	58	11	16	6	7	—N/a	—N/a	Gallup	1,004	± 3.1	PDF
September 24, 1998	47	14	13	12	11	—N/a	2	Angus Reid	1,515	± 2.5	PDF
August 3, 1998	60	12	12	—N/a	—N/a	—N/a	—N/a	Gallup	1,002	± 3.1	PDF
July 16, 1998	49	14	13	—N/a	13	—N/a	—N/a	Environics	2,021	± 2.0	HTML
June 23, 1998	49	14	15	10	11	—N/a	1	Angus Reid	1,504	± 2.5	HTML
Jean Charest resigns from the leadership of the Progressive Conservative Party (April 2, 1998)
March 24, 1998	58	14	14	7	6	—N/a	—N/a	Gallup	1,003	± 3.1	PDF
January 27, 1998	55	14	13	9	8	—N/a	—N/a	Gallup	1,002	± 3.1	PDF
January 26, 1998	47	16	15	10	10	—N/a	1	Angus Reid	1,500	± 2.5	PDF
December 15, 1997	51	13	16	8	10	—N/a	—N/a	Gallup	—N/a	—N/a	PDF
November 25, 1997	47	16	14	11	11	—N/a	1	Angus Reid	1,516	± 2.5	HTML
September 23, 1997	48	15	15	8	13	—N/a	—N/a	Gallup	1,003	± 3.1	PDF
Signature of the Calgary Declaration (September 14, 1997)
August 28, 1997	53	13	16	8	8	—N/a	2	Gallup	1,003	± 3.1	
July 30, 1997	45	17	14	9	14	—N/a	1	Environics	2,001	—N/a	HTML
June 2, 1997	38.46	19.35	18.84	10.67	11.05	0.43	1.20				

== By geographic area ==
=== In the Atlantic provinces ===
Evolution of voting intentions in the Atlantic provinces
Last day of survey	LPC	CA (Reform)	PC	NDP	Other	Polling firm	Sample	ME	Source
November 26, 2000	46	11	23	19	1	Environics	—N/a	—N/a	HTML
November 25, 2000	50	12	24	12	3	Léger	201	—N/a	PDF
November 23, 2000	36	12	29	23	0	Compass	87	—N/a	HTML
November 22, 2000	50	10	23	12	4	Ekos	—N/a	—N/a	PDF
November 21, 2000	33	11	36	18	2	Compass	89	—N/a	HTML
November 16, 2000	42	16	28	13	1	Léger	—N/a	—N/a	
November 15, 2000	52	12	22	13	1	Ekos	—N/a	—N/a	PDF
November 6, 2000	50	15	20	14	1	Environics	265	± 6.1	HTML
October 30, 2000	55	14	22	9	0	Environics	—N/a	—N/a	HTML
October 26, 2000	53	13	19	16	0	Decima	—N/a	—N/a	HTML
October 23, 2000	61	8	17	13	0	Environics	—N/a	—N/a	HTML
October 22, 2000	64	2	17	11	7	Léger	—N/a	—N/a	
Official call of federal elections (October 22, 2000)
October 16, 2000	52	9	22	17	1	Environics	—N/a	—N/a	HTML
October 7, 2000	53	13	19	16	0	Ekos	—N/a	—N/a	PDF
August 24, 2000	51	7	31	11	0	Angus Reid	120	—N/a	PDF
August 12, 2000	42	15	21	22	0	Angus Reid	—N/a	—N/a	1 2
July 16, 2000	49	9	24	18	—N/a	Environics	—N/a	—N/a	HTML
May 25, 2000	52	6	29	13	0	Angus Reid	120	—N/a	PDF
May 15, 2000	65	6	21	8	0	Ekos	—N/a	—N/a	
February 2, 2000	40	5	32	21	3	Angus Reid	122	—N/a	PDF
July 19, 1999	46	5	30	19	0	Gallup	—N/a	—N/a	PDF
May 30, 1999	46	3	24	27	0	Angus Reid	100	—N/a	PDF
April 18, 1999	58	4	21	17	0	Gallup	—N/a	—N/a	PDF
September 24, 1998	43	8	25	23	1	Angus Reid	105	—N/a	PDF
June 23, 1998	53	6	25	16	0	Angus Reid	109	—N/a	PDF
January 26, 1998	57	3	25	14	1	Angus Reid	108	—N/a	PDF
July 30, 1997	35	12	24	28	1	Environics	—N/a	—N/a	HTML
Elections in 1997	32.8	9.0	33.8	23.7	0.7				

=== In Québec ===
During the election campaign
Last day of survey	LPC	CA (Reform)	PC	BQ	NDP	Other	Polling firm	Sample	ME	Source
Voting result	44.2	6.7	5.6	39.9	1.8	1.8				
November 26, 2000	41	9	4	45	1	0	Environics	—N/a	—N/a	HTML
November 25, 2000	43	5	5	41	2	3	Léger	1,001	—N/a	PDF
November 23, 2000	40	9	7	40	3	1	Ipsos	—N/a	—N/a	PDF
November 23, 2000	40	10	5	39	3	2	Sondagem	912	± 3.3	PDF
November 23, 2000	40	4	6	42	3	5	Compass	278	—N/a	HTML
November 22, 2000	42	6	4	42	4	3	Ekos	—N/a	—N/a	PDF
November 15, 2000	43	6	5	42	3	1	Ekos	804	± 3.5	PDF
November 15, 2000	41	9	6	40	2	2	SOM	—N/a	—N/a	PDF
November 14, 2000	43	5	4	43	4	0	Environics	421	± 4.9	HTML
November 12, 2000	38	6	5	46	4	1	Ipsos	550	—N/a	PDF
November 10, 2000	35	4	7	48	—N/a	—N/a	Compass	—N/a	—N/a	PDF
November 6, 2000	48	8	1	38	4	0	Environics	421	± 4.9	HTML
November 3, 2000	43	8	2	43	2	3	Léger	3,514	± 1.66	PDF
November 2, 2000	38	10	2	43	6	2	Ipsos	—N/a	—N/a	PDF
October 30, 2000	45	6	2	45	2	0	Environics	302	± 5.8	PDF
October 26, 2000	42	11	3	39	4	2	Decima	—N/a	—N/a	HTML
October 26, 2000	37	5	4	36	3	1	Sondagem	1,008	± 3.1	PDF
October 25, 2000	43	11	6	37	4	—N/a	Ipsos	—N/a	± 4.9	
October 23, 2000	44	7	6	38	5	1	Environics	—N/a	—N/a	HTML
October 22, 2000	43	9	3	39	4	2	Léger	1,001	± 3.1	
Official call of federal elections (October 22, 2000)

During the 36th Parliament of Canada
Last day of survey	LPC	CA (Reform)	PC	BQ	NDP	Other	Polling firm	Sample	ME	Source
October 16, 2000	41	10	3	41	5	1	Environics	—N/a	—N/a	HTML
October 12, 2000	49	5	1	39	3	2	Ipsos	—N/a	—N/a	1 2
October 7, 2000	43	11	3	40	3	1	Ekos	—N/a	—N/a	PDF
September 27, 2000	40	11	4	40	3	2	Ipsos	—N/a	—N/a	1 2
September 24, 2000	40	7	5	42	6	1	CROP	1,000	± 3.0	PDF
September 15, 2000	34	7	3	37	3	—N/a	Sondagem	1,003	± 3.0	PDF
August 24, 2000	39	8	6	39	7	1	Angus Reid	400	—N/a	PDF
August 20, 2000	43	5	3	43	3	3	Léger	1,006	± 3.4	
August 12, 2000	39	7	4	43	4	2	Angus Reid	—N/a	—N/a	1 2
July 26, 2000	41	8	4	40	6	1	Angus Reid	—N/a	—N/a	1 2
July 16, 2000	39	9	7	31	12	—N/a	Environics	—N/a	—N/a	HTML
June 26, 2000	41	4	5	43	7	—N/a	CROP	—N/a	—N/a	PDF
May 25, 2000	48	2	5	40	4	1	Angus Reid	400	—N/a	PDF
May 15, 2000	46	4	3	39	5	3	Ekos	—N/a	—N/a	
May 8, 2000	48	4	—N/a	36	—N/a	—N/a	Ekos	—N/a	—N/a	
April 30, 2000	45	—N/a	8	39	5	3	Léger	1,000	± 3.4	PDF
March 6, 2000	39	3	5	45	7	1	Angus Reid	400	—N/a	PDF
February 27, 2000	44	—N/a	8	41	—N/a	—N/a	Léger	984	± 3.1	PDF
February 2, 2000	46	2	5	37	6	4	Angus Reid	400	—N/a	PDF
January 23, 2000	48	1	6	40	3	2	Léger	1,010	—N/a	PDF
November 22, 1999	58	—N/a	7	30	3	—N/a	Gallup	264	± 6.0	PDF
November 14, 1999	49	1	10	35	5	1	Léger	1,004	± 3.1	PDF
November 1, 1999	46	—N/a	—N/a	38	—N/a	—N/a	Environics	—N/a	—N/a	HTML
August 2, 1999	47	—N/a	—N/a	38	—N/a	—N/a	Environics	—N/a	—N/a	HTML
July 19, 1999	52	—N/a	7	40	—N/a	—N/a	Gallup	—N/a	± 6.0	PDF
June 29, 1999	44	1	10	40	4	1	Léger	1,005	± 3.1	1 2
June 19, 1999	50	—N/a	—N/a	38	—N/a	—N/a	Gallup	—N/a	± 6.1	PDF
May 30, 1999	42	2	8	43	5	—N/a	Angus Reid	351	—N/a	PDF
May 13, 1999	54	—N/a	—N/a	32	—N/a	—N/a	Ekos	—N/a	—N/a	
April 18, 1999	49	—N/a	6	36	3	—N/a	Gallup	—N/a	± 6.0	PDF
April 14, 1999	45	2	7	41	3	—N/a	Léger	1,005	± 3.1	
January 25, 1999	50	1	3	30	4	—N/a	Ekos	1,500	± 2.8	HTML
January 3, 1999	43	—N/a	—N/a	43	—N/a	—N/a	Environics	—N/a	—N/a	HTML
November 1, 1998	46	2	6	40	5	0	Angus Reid	342	—N/a	PDF
October 24, 1998	43	—N/a	—N/a	44	—N/a	—N/a	Environics	—N/a	—N/a	HTML
October 21, 1998	55	—N/a	—N/a	28	—N/a	—N/a	Gallup	—N/a	—N/a	PDF
September 24, 1998	43	1	6	45	3	2	Angus Reid	352	—N/a	PDF
August 11, 1998	47	1	10	38	3	1	Léger	1,001	± 3.1	PDF
July 16, 1998	49	—N/a	—N/a	39	—N/a	—N/a	Environics	—N/a	—N/a	HTML
June 23, 1998	45	0	8	39	7	1	Angus Reid	352	—N/a	HTML
February 19, 1998	43	1	14	38	3	1	CROP	927	± 3.3	PDF
February 17, 1998	40	1	18	37	4	1	Léger	1,000	± 3.1	PDF
January 26, 1998	39	1	14	41	4	1	Angus Reid	343	—N/a	PDF
December 9, 1997	38	1	13	37	4	8	Angus Reid	1,000	± 3.1	PDF
November 25, 1997	39	1	12	43	6	1	Angus Reid	342	—N/a	1 2
November 21, 1997	32	1	31	30	4	3	SOM	810	± 3.7	PDF
November 19, 1997	39	1	15	38	6	0	Léger	1,001	± 3.1	PDF
October 20, 1997	37	1	21	38	5	1	Léger	1,000	± 3.1	PDF
September 23, 1997	45	—N/a	—N/a	32	—N/a	—N/a	Gallup	268	± 6.0	PDF
August 28, 1997	51	—N/a	—N/a	30	—N/a	—N/a	Gallup	269	± 6.0	
July 30, 1997	39	2	18	36	5	0	Environics	—N/a	—N/a	HTML
Election 1997	36.7	0.3	22.2	37.9	2.0	1.2				

=== In Ontario ===
Evolution of voting intentions in Ontario
Last day of survey	LPC	CA (Reform)	PC	NDP	Other	Polling firm	Sample	ME	Source
Voting result	51.5	23.6	14.4	8.3	2.2				
November 26, 2000	51	23	14	10	2	Environics	—N/a	—N/a	HTML
November 25, 2000	51	21	15	11	4	Léger	602	—N/a	PDF
November 23, 2000	54	24	14	6	3	Compass	419	—N/a	HTML
November 23, 2000	49	25	14	10	1	Ipsos	1,225	—N/a	PDF
November 22, 2000	53	21	13	9	3	Ekos	—N/a	—N/a	PDF
November 16, 2000	55	22	11	9	3	Léger	1,202	—N/a	
November 15, 2000	54	24	12	8	1	Ekos	—N/a	—N/a	PDF
November 6, 2000	56	25	10	8	1	Environics	439	± 4.8	HTML
October 30, 2000	55	29	9	7	1	Environics	—N/a	—N/a	HTML
October 26, 2000	58	26	10	6	0	Decima	—N/a	—N/a	HTML
October 23, 2000	58	22	12	7	0	Environics	—N/a	—N/a	HTML
October 22, 2000	57	18	11	9	5	Léger	569	± 4.0	
Official call of federal elections (October 22, 2000)
October 16, 2000	56	22	11	9	2	Environics	—N/a	—N/a	HTML
October 7, 2000	58	26	10	6	0	Ekos	—N/a	—N/a	PDF
August 24, 2000	57	20	12	8	2	Angus Reid	525	—N/a	PDF
August 12, 2000	55	21	13	9	1	Angus Reid	—N/a	—N/a	1 2
August 6, 2000	57	20	12	—N/a	—N/a	Ekos	—N/a	—N/a	
July 16, 2000	55	17	16	11	—N/a	Environics	—N/a	—N/a	HTML
May 25, 2000	53	16	19	10	1	Angus Reid	525	—N/a	PDF
May 15, 2000	57	18	13	11	—N/a	Ekos	—N/a	—N/a	
May 8, 2000	63	14	13	—N/a	—N/a	Ekos	—N/a	—N/a	
February 2, 2000	55	8	21	11	5	Angus Reid	525	—N/a	PDF
July 19, 1999	55	7	33	—N/a	—N/a	Gallup	—N/a	—N/a	PDF
May 30, 1999	55	7	26	12	0	Angus Reid	469	—N/a	PDF
April 18, 1999	63	4	22	10	—N/a	Gallup	—N/a	—N/a	PDF
September 24, 1998	59	10	17	13	1	Angus Reid	512	—N/a	PDF
August 3, 1998	71	—N/a	—N/a	—N/a	—N/a	Gallup	—N/a	—N/a	PDF
June 23, 1998	58	12	19	10	1	Angus Reid	512	—N/a	PDF
January 26, 1998	57	15	17	11	1	Angus Reid	525	—N/a	PDF
December 15, 1997	58	—N/a	21	—N/a	—N/a	Gallup	—N/a	—N/a	PDF
November 25, 1997	60	12	17	11	1	Angus Reid	522	—N/a	1 2
September 23, 1997	59	—N/a	—N/a	—N/a	—N/a	Gallup	—N/a	—N/a	PDF
July 30, 1997	60	14	13	12	1	Environics	—N/a	—N/a	HTML
Election 1997	49.5	19.1	18.8	10.7	1.9				

=== In the Prairies ===
Evolution of voting intentions in Prairies (Manitoba and Saskatchewan)
Last day of survey	LPC	CA (Reform)	PC	NDP	Other	Polling firm	Sample	ME	Source
November 25, 2000	32	38	9	19	3	Léger	201	—N/a	PDF
November 23, 2000	28	34	7	25	5	Compass	86	—N/a	HTML
November 23, 2000	31	34	9	25	1	Ipsos	470	—N/a	PDF
November 22, 2000	34	35	11	21	0	Ekos	—N/a	—N/a	PDF
November 15, 2000	32	42	5	19	1	Ekos	—N/a	—N/a	PDF
November 6, 2000	32	43	15	9	1	Environics	175	± 7.6	HTML
October 30, 2000	30	45	7	17	0	Environics	—N/a	—N/a	HTML
October 26, 2000	45	31	8	15	0	Decima	—N/a	—N/a	HTML
October 22, 2000	38	25	10	18	9	Léger	—N/a	—N/a	
Official call of federal elections (October 22, 2000)
October 7, 2000	45	31	8	15	0	Ekos	—N/a	—N/a	PDF
August 24, 2000	29	36	5	26	3	Angus Reid	120	—N/a	PDF
August 12, 2000	24	36	13	25	1	Angus Reid	—N/a	—N/a	1 2
May 25, 2000	39	29	11	20	1	Angus Reid	120	—N/a	PDF
February 2, 2000	37	20	11	26	6	Angus Reid	120	—N/a	PDF
May 30, 1999	48	17	11	24	0	Angus Reid	103	—N/a	PDF
April 18, 1999	37	29	18	15	—N/a	Gallup	—N/a	—N/a	PDF
September 24, 1998	41	27	7	21	4	Angus Reid	512	—N/a	PDF
June 23, 1998	35	30	12	23	1	Angus Reid	96	—N/a	PDF
January 26, 1998	45	24	11	18	1	Angus Reid	104	—N/a	PDF
Elections in 1997	29.7	29.6	13.0	26.9	0.9				

=== In Alberta ===
Evolution of voting intentions in Alberta
Last day of survey	LPC	CA (Reform)	PC	NDP	Other	Polling firm	Sample	ME	Source
Voting result	20.9	58.9	13.5	5.4	1.3				
November 26, 2000	21	57	14	7	1	Environics	—N/a	—N/a	HTML
November 25, 2000	22	60	10	8	1	Léger	201	—N/a	PDF
November 23, 2000	20	59	10	5	7	Compass	106	—N/a	HTML
November 23, 2000	20	57	13	7	1	Ipsos	335	—N/a	PDF
November 22, 2000	21	57	13	7	2	Ekos	—N/a	—N/a	PDF
November 15, 2000	26	58	9	5	2	Ekos	—N/a	—N/a	PDF
November 6, 2000	28	53	13	4	1	Environics	226	± 6.7	HTML
October 30, 2000	21	64	11	4	0	Environics	—N/a	—N/a	HTML
October 26, 2000	29	57	9	5	1	Decima	—N/a	—N/a	HTML
October 23, 2000	32	54	11	1	2	Environics	—N/a	—N/a	HTML
October 22, 2000	34	50	9	3	4	Léger	—N/a	—N/a	
Official call of federal elections (October 22, 2000)
October 16, 2000	28	54	9	9	1	Environics	—N/a	—N/a	HTML
October 7, 2000	29	57	9	5	1	Ekos	—N/a	—N/a	PDF
August 24, 2000	35	49	9	6	1	Angus Reid	135	—N/a	PDF
August 12, 2000	22	59	10	7	1	Angus Reid	—N/a	—N/a	1 2
July 16, 2000	29	47	11	10	—N/a	Environics	—N/a	—N/a	HTML
May 25, 2000	25	50	14	8	3	Angus Reid	151	—N/a	PDF
May 15, 2000	28	55	—N/a	—N/a	—N/a	Ekos	—N/a	—N/a	
Creation of Canadian Alliance (March 27, 2000)
February 2, 2000	30	38	15	9	7	Angus Reid	135	—N/a	PDF
May 30, 1999	33	37	23	7	0	Angus Reid	112	—N/a	PDF
September 24, 1998	28	44	19	8	1	Angus Reid	128	—N/a	PDF
June 23, 1998	37	40	16	6	1	Angus Reid	124	—N/a	PDF
January 26, 1998	37	41	16	5	1	Angus Reid	127	—N/a	PDF
July 30, 1997	31	48	14	7	0	Environics	—N/a	—N/a	HTML
Election 1997	24.0	54.6	14.4	5.7	1.3				

=== In British Columbia ===
Evolution of voting intentions in British Columbia
Last day of survey	LPC	CA (Reform)	PC	NDP	GPC	Other	Polling firm	Sample	ME	Source
Voting result	27.7	49.4	7.3	11.3	2.1	2.2				
November 26, 2000	32	43	11	10	—N/a	4	Environics	—N/a	—N/a	HTML
November 25, 2000	34	45	5	11	—N/a	5	Léger	308	—N/a	PDF
November 23, 2000	28	45	9	13	—N/a	5	Compass	153	—N/a	HTML
November 23, 2000	28	48	9	12	2	0	Ipsos	459	—N/a	PDF
November 22, 2000	31	44	8	12	—N/a	6	Ekos	—N/a	—N/a	PDF
November 15, 2000	33	43	6	15	—N/a	3	Ekos	—N/a	—N/a	PDF
November 6, 2000	41	43	4	10	—N/a	2	Environics	331	± 5.5	HTML
October 30, 2000	38	45	3	12	—N/a	2	Environics	—N/a	—N/a	HTML
October 26, 2000	37	49	5	8	—N/a	2	Decima	—N/a	—N/a	HTML
October 23, 2000	35	40	6	17	—N/a	1	Environics	—N/a	—N/a	HTML
October 22, 2000	39	38	3	12	—N/a	8	Léger	—N/a	—N/a	
Official call of federal elections (October 22, 2000)
October 16, 2000	31	46	7	15	—N/a	1	Environics	—N/a	—N/a	HTML
October 7, 2000	37	49	5	8	—N/a	2	Ekos	—N/a	—N/a	PDF
August 24, 2000	37	39	5	15	—N/a	4	Angus Reid	200	—N/a	PDF
August 12, 2000	36	44	5	11	—N/a	4	Angus Reid	—N/a	—N/a	1 2
July 16, 2000	34	39	7	18	—N/a	—N/a	Environics	—N/a	—N/a	HTML
May 25, 2000	43	33	8	13	—N/a	3	Angus Reid	200	—N/a	PDF
May 15, 2000	43	35	5	11	—N/a	—N/a	Ekos	—N/a	—N/a	
February 2, 2000	40	28	7	14	—N/a	11	Angus Reid	200	—N/a	PDF
September 10, 1999	53	23	8	14	4	0	Angus Reid	600	± 4.0	HTML
July 19, 1999	59	18	7	12	—N/a	—N/a	Gallup	—N/a	—N/a	PDF
May 30, 1999	39	37	10	14	0	0	Angus Reid	162	—N/a	PDF
April 18, 1999	57	22	7	10	—N/a	—N/a	Gallup	—N/a	—N/a	PDF
September 24, 1998	43	29	11	13	—N/a	5	Angus Reid	128	—N/a	PDF
June 23, 1998	44	29	10	14	—N/a	3	Angus Reid	172	—N/a	PDF
January 26, 1998	36	39	8	16	—N/a	1	Angus Reid	179	—N/a	PDF
July 30, 1997	33	35	5	25	—N/a	2	Environics	—N/a	—N/a	HTML
Election 1997	28.8	43.1	6.2	18.2	2.0	1.7				
