= Results of the 2004 Canadian federal election by riding =

This is a seat by seat list of candidates in the 2004 Canadian election.

For more information about the election see 2004 Canadian federal election.

== 2004 federal redistribution ==
Due to the 2001 census, Canada's 301 electoral districts increased to 308 as of April 1, 2004. Boundary changes took effect across the country to even out population redistribution, and seven new districts were formed. Each province has a minimum number of seats, and therefore it is rare for a province to lose seats in a redistribution. The numbers beside the region names correspond to the map below.

Province	Seats				Avg. Population per Seat
Province	Total	Created	Eliminated	Change	Avg. Population per Seat
1. Newfoundland and Labrador	7	0	0	-	73 276
2. Nova Scotia	11	0	0	-	82 546
3. Prince Edward Island	4	0	0	-	33 824
4. New Brunswick	10	0	0	-	72 950
Quebec	75	4	4	-	96 500
5. Eastern	5	0	1	-1
6. Côte-Nord & Saguenay	5	0	2	-2
7. Quebec City	5	1	0	+1
8. Central	9	1	1	-
9. Eastern Townships	9	0	0	-
10. Montérégie	10	0	0	-
11. Northern Montreal & Laval	8	1	0	+1
12. Eastern Montreal	5	0	0	-
13. Western Montreal	9	0	0	-
14. Laurentides, Outaouais & North	10	1	0	+1
Ontario	106	8	5	+3	107 642
15. Ottawa	7	1	0	+1
16. Eastern	7	0	1	-1
17. Central	11	1	0	+1
18. Southern Durham & York	9	2	0	+2
19. Suburban Toronto	12	0	0	-
20. Central Toronto	10	0	0	-
21. Brampton, Mississauga & Oakville	9	2	1	+1
22. Hamilton, Burlington & Niagara	10	1	2	-1
23. Midwestern	11	1	0	+1
24. Southwestern	10	0	0	-
25. Northern	10	0	1	-1
Manitoba	14	1	1	-	79 970
26. Rural	6	0	0	-
27. Winnipeg	8	1	1	-
Saskatchewan	14	0	0	-	69 924
28. Northern	7	0	0	-
29. Southern	7	0	0	-
Alberta	28	3	1	+2	106 243
30. Rural	12	1	0	+1
31. Edmonton & environs	8	1	1	-
32. Calgary	8	1	0	+1
British Columbia	36	3	1	+2	108 548
33. Interior	9	0	1	-1
34. Fraser Valley & S. Lower Mainland	10	2	0	+2
35. Vancouver & N. Lower Mainland	11	1	0	+1
36. Vancouver Island	6	0	0	-
37. Nunavut	1	0	0	-	26 745
37. Northwest Territories	1	0	0	-	37 360
37. Yukon	1	0	0	-	28 675

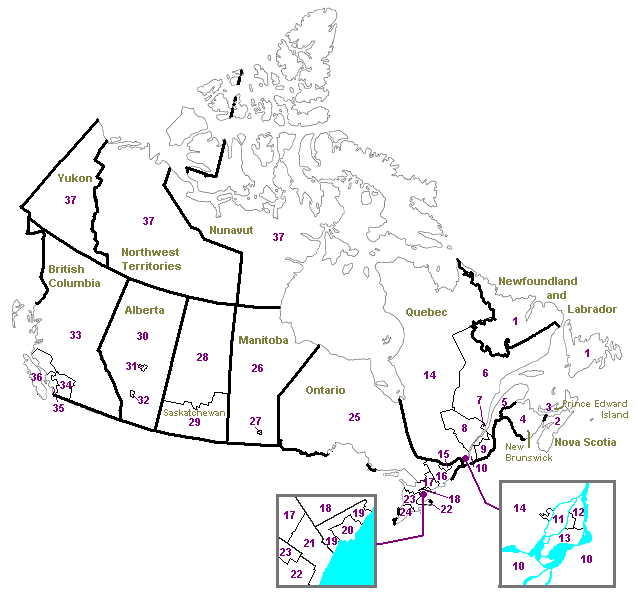

== Candidates and ridings ==
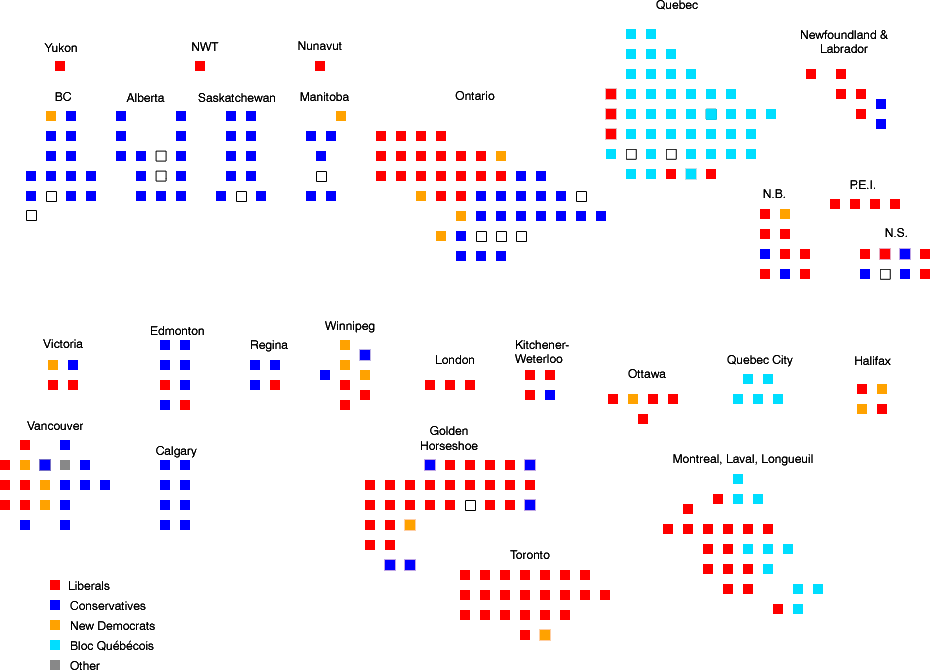
schematic seat-by-seat results

All candidate names are those on the official list of confirmed candidates; names in media or on party website may differ slightly.

Names in bold represent party leaders and cabinet ministers.
† represents that the incumbent chose not to run again.
§ represents that the incumbent was defeated for nomination.
‡ represents that the incumbent ran in a different district.
^{@} represents that the candidate was automatically granted the nomination by party leader.

Nominations closed on June 7, 2004. Elections Canada released a final candidate list on June 9.

Party key and abbreviations guide

•
**Green Party**
- (Ind.) - **Independent**
- Minor Parties:
  - (CAP) - **Canadian Action Party**
  - (CHP) - **Christian Heritage Party**
  - (Comm.) - **Communist Party**
  - (Libert.) - **Libertarian Party**
  - (Mar.) - **Marijuana Party**
  - (M-L) - **Marxist–Leninist Party**
  - (PC) - **Progressive Canadian Party**
•
**New Democratic Party**
•
**Bloc Québécois**
•
**Liberal Party**
•
**Conservative Party**
•
**Independent/Other**

=== Newfoundland and Labrador ===
Electoral district	Candidates					Incumbent
Electoral district	Liberal	Conservative	NDP	Green	Independent	Incumbent
Avalon	**R. John Efford**; 18,335; 58.34%	Rick Dalton; 9,211; 29.31%	Michael Kehoe; 3,450; 10.98%	Don C. Ferguson; 430; 1.37%		**John Efford** (Note: Efford won seat in 2002 byelection; originally held by Liberal Brian Tobin.)
Bonavista—Exploits	Scott Simms; 15,970; 48.20%	Rex Barnes; 13,786; 41.61%	Samuel Robert McLean; 2,667; 8.05%	Ed Sailor White; 367; 1.11%	John Lannon; 344; 1.04%	Rex Barnes (Note: Barnes won seat in 2002 byelection; originally held by Liberal George Baker.)
Humber—St. Barbe—Baie Verte	Gerry Byrne; 17,820; 62.56%	Wynanne Downer; 6,538; 22.95%	Holly Pike; 3,743; 13.14%	Steve Durant; 384; 1.35%		Gerry Byrne
Labrador	Lawrence David O'Brien; 5,524; 62.23%	Merrill Strachan; 1,400; 15.77%	Shawn Crann; 856; 9.64%	Lori-Ann Martino; 178; 2.01%	Ern Condon; 919; 10.35%	Lawrence D. O'Brien
Random—Burin—St. George's	Bill Matthews; 12,383; 46.77%	Larry Peckford; 4,820; 18.21%	Des McGrath; 8,797; 33.23%	Justin Dollimont; 474; 1.79%		Bill Matthews
St. John's North	Walter Noel; 13,343; 36.65%	Norman E Doyle; 15,073; 41.40%	Janine Piller; 7,198; 19.77%	Scott Vokey; 791; 2.17%		Norman Doyle
St. John's South	Siobhan Coady; 11,879; 35.26%	Loyola Hearn; 13,330; 39.57%	Peg Norman; 7,989; 23.71%	Stephen Daniel Willcott; 493; 1.46%		Loyola Hearn

=== Prince Edward Island ===
Electoral district	Candidates					Incumbent
Electoral district	Liberal	Conservative	NDP	Green	Christian Heritage	Incumbent
Cardigan	Lawrence MacAulay; 11,064; 53.38%	Peter McQuaid; 6,889; 33.24%	Dave MacKinnon; 2,103; 10.15%	Jeremy Stiles; 670; 3.23%		Lawrence MacAulay
Charlottetown	Shawn Murphy; 9,175; 49.36%	Darren Peters; 5,121; 27.55%	Dody Crane; 3,428; 18.44%	Will McFadden; 760; 4.09%	Baird Judson; 105; 0.56%	Shawn Murphy
Egmont	Joe McGuire; 10,220; 55.44%	Reg Harper; 5,363; 29.09%	Regena Kaye Russell; 2,133; 11.57%	Irené Novaczek; 717; 3.89%		Joe McGuire
Malpeque	Wayne Easter; 9,782; 51.90%	Mary Crane; 6,126; 32.50%	Ken Bingham; 1,902; 10.09%	Sharon Labchuk; 1,037; 5.50%		Wayne Easter

=== Nova Scotia ===
Electoral district	Candidates					Incumbent
Electoral district	Liberal	Conservative	NDP	Green	Other	Incumbent
Cape Breton—Canso	Rodger Cuzner; 20,139; 53.26%	Kenzie MacNeil; 7,654; 20.24%	Shirley Hartery; 9,197; 24.32%	Seumas Gibson; 820; 2.17%		Rodger Cuzner
Central Nova	Susan L. Green; 9,986; 26.39%	Peter G. MacKay; 16,376; 43.27%	Alexis MacDonald; 10,470; 27.66%	Rebecca Mosher; 1,015; 2.68%		Peter MacKay
Dartmouth—Cole Harbour	Mike Savage; 17,425; 42.07%	Mike MacDonald; 8,739; 21.10%	Susan MacAlpine-Gillis; 13,463; 32.50%	Michael Marshall; 1,311; 3.16%	Tracy Parsons (PC); 415 1.00%	Wendy Lill†
Dartmouth—Cole Harbour	Mike Savage; 17,425; 42.07%	Mike MacDonald; 8,739; 21.10%	Susan MacAlpine-Gillis; 13,463; 32.50%	Michael Marshall; 1,311; 3.16%	Charles Spurr (M-L); 70 0.17%	Wendy Lill†
Halifax	Sheila Fougere; 17,267; 39.11%	Kevin Leslie Keefe; 6,457; 14.63%	Alexa McDonough; 18,341; 41.55%	Michael Oddy; 2,081; 4.71%		Alexa McDonough
Halifax West	**Geoff Regan**; 19,083; 47.50%	Ken MacPhee; 8,413; 20.94%	Bill Carr; 11,228; 27.95%	Martin Willison; 1,452; 3.61%		**Geoff Regan**
Kings—Hants	Scott Brison; 17,555; 46.61%	Bob Mullan; 11,344; 30.12%	Skip Hambling; 6,663; 17.69%	Kevin Stacey; 1,364; 3.62%	Richard Hennigar (Ind.); 242 0.64%	Scott Brison (Note: Brison defected from the Progressive Conservative caucus in December 2003.)
Kings—Hants	Scott Brison; 17,555; 46.61%	Bob Mullan; 11,344; 30.12%	Skip Hambling; 6,663; 17.69%	Kevin Stacey; 1,364; 3.62%	Jim Hnatiuk (CHP); 493 1.31%	Scott Brison
North Nova	Dianne Brushett; 10,591; 26.49%	Bill Casey; 20,188; 50.49%	Margaret E. Sagar; 7,560; 18.91%	Sheila G. Richardson; 1,245; 3.11%	Jack Moors (PC); 399; 1.00%	Bill Casey
Sackville—Eastern Shore	Dale Stevens; 11,222; 28.66%	Steve Streatch; 8,363; 21.35%	Peter Stoffer; 17,925; 45.77%	David Fullerton; 1,007; 2.57%	Greg Moors (PC); 645; 1.65%	Peter Stoffer
South Shore—St. Margaret's	John Chandler; 12,658; 32.08%	Gerald Keddy; 14,954; 37.90%	Gordon Earle; 10,140; 25.70%	Katie Morris Boudreau; 1,700; 4.31%		Gerald Keddy
Sydney—Victoria	Mark Eyking; 19,372; 52.13%	Howie MacDonald; 5,897; 15.87%	John Hugh Edwards; 10,298; 27.71%	Chris Milburn; 855; 2.30%	B. Chris Gallant (Ind.); 264 0.71%	Mark Eyking
Sydney—Victoria	Mark Eyking; 19,372; 52.13%	Howie MacDonald; 5,897; 15.87%	John Hugh Edwards; 10,298; 27.71%	Chris Milburn; 855; 2.30%	Cathy Thériault (Mar.); 474 1.28%	Mark Eyking
West Nova	Robert Thibault; 18,343; 42.64%	Jon Charles Carey; 14,209; 33.03%	Edmund Arthur Bull; 9,086; 21.12%	Matthew Granger; 1,385; 3.22%		Robert Thibault

=== New Brunswick ===
Electoral district	Candidates					Incumbent
Electoral district	Liberal	Conservative	NDP	Green	Other	Incumbent
Acadie—Bathurst	Serge Rousselle; 14,452; 32.67%	Joel E. Bernard; 4,841; 10.94%	Yvon Godin; 23,857; 53.93%	Mario Lanteigne; 1,085; 2.45%		Yvon Godin
Beauséjour	Dominic LeBlanc; 21,934; 53.28%	Angela Vautour; 11,604; 28.19%	Omer Bourque; 6,056; 14.71%	Anna Girouard; 1,574; 3.82%		Dominic LeBlanc
Fredericton	**Andy Scott**; 19,819; 46.78%	Kent Fox; 14,193; 33.50%	John Carty; 7,360; 17.37%	Daron Letts; 997; 2.35%		**Andy Scott**
Fundy	John Herron; 11,635; 34.77%	Rob Moore; 14,997; 44.82%	Pat Hanratty; 5,417; 16.19%	Karin Bach; 1,051; 3.14%	David Raymond Amos (Ind.); 358; 1.07%	John Herron (Note: Herron was formerly PC, sat until dissolution as an independent, then ran as a Liberal.)
Madawaska—Restigouche	Jean-Claude J.C. D'Amours; 14,144; 44.66%	Benoit Violette; 7,605; 24.01%	Rodolphe Martin; 8,737; 27.59%	Jovette Cyr; 1,185; 3.74%		Jeannot Castonguay†
Miramichi	Charles Isaac Hubbard; 15,647; 48.08%	Michael J. Morrison; 9,448; 29.03%	Hilaire Rousselle; 5,980; 18.38%	Gary Sanipass; 1,468; 4.51%		Charles Hubbard
Moncton—Riverview—Dieppe	**Claudette Bradshaw**; 25,266; 59.29%	Jean LeBlanc; 10,003; 23.48%	Hélène Lapointe; 5,344; 12.54%	Judith Hamel; 1,998; 4.69%		**Claudette Bradshaw**
St. Croix—Belleisle	Jim Dunlap; 9,702; 31.51%	Greg Thompson; 16,339; 53.06%	Patrick Webber; 3,600; 11.69%	Erik Matthew Millett; 960; 3.12%	David Szemerda (CAP); 194; 0.63%	Greg Thompson
Saint John	Paul Zed; 15,725; 43.28%	Bob McVicar; 12,212; 33.62%	Terry Albright; 6,926; 19.06%	Jonathan Cormier; 807; 2.22%	Tom Oland (Ind.); 290 0.80%	Elsie Wayne†
Saint John	Paul Zed; 15,725; 43.28%	Bob McVicar; 12,212; 33.62%	Terry Albright; 6,926; 19.06%	Jonathan Cormier; 807; 2.22%	Jim Wood (Mar.); 369 1.02%	Elsie Wayne†
Tobique—Mactaquac	Andy Savoy; 16,787; 48.23%	Mike Allen; 13,779; 39.59%	Jason Mapplebeck; 2,957; 8.50%	Scott Jones; 1,282; 3.68%		Andy Savoy

=== Quebec ===
Quebec flag

Throughout most of recent history, the Liberals have dominated in federal politics in Quebec, even when Quebec voters were simultaneously electing the Parti Québécois at the provincial level.

There have been temporary Progressive Conservative breakthroughs under Diefenbaker in the 1958 election, and under native son Brian Mulroney in the 1984 election and the 1988 election, but these did not last. The 1958 result was helped by an alliance with Maurice Duplessis's formidable provincial electoral machine. But by the 1962 election, Duplessis had died and his Union Nationale party was out of office and in disarray, and Diefenbaker's support in Quebec had evaporated. The Mulroney-era resurgence also collapsed entirely when he retired from politics.

The Bloc Québécois was formed for the 1993 election in the aftermath of the failure of the Meech Lake Accord and Charlottetown Accord, and has won more seats in Quebec than the Liberals in every election it has run in. The number of seats won by the Bloc has declined in each successive election from 1993 to 1997 to 2000. The party has now had a resurgence due to the sponsorship scandal and the unpopularity of Jean Charest's provincial Liberal government, which influences support for the federal Liberals even though the two parties are independent of one another.

Polls show the Bloc with a strong lead, and they may return to the number of seats they had in 1993. However, the Liberals are likely to dominate in many parts of Montreal. Ridings where Anglophone voters are a significant factor are among the safest Liberal seats in all of Canada.

The other two major federal parties, the Conservatives and the New Democratic Party (NDP) are not expected to win any seats and are struggling to move out of single digits in the polls. The NDP in particular has historically never had any electoral success in Quebec up to that point.

==== Eastern Quebec ====
Electoral district	Candidates						Incumbent
Electoral district	Liberal	BQ	Conservative	NDP	Green	Communist	Incumbent
Gaspésie—Îles-de-la-Madeleine	Georges Farrah; 12,579; 32.65%	Raynald Blais; 21,446; 55.67%	Guy De Coste; 2,636; 6.84%	Philip Toone; 805; 2.09%	Bob Eichenberger; 1,060; 2.75%		Georges Farrah; Bonaventure—Gaspé—Îles-de-la-Madeleine—Pabok
Lévis—Bellechasse	Christian Jobin; 13,664; 27.62%	Réal Lapierre; 21,930; 44.34%	Gilles Vézina; 9,425; 19.05%	Louise Foisy; 1,910; 3.86%	Sylvain Castonguay; 2,372; 4.80%	Christophe Vaillancourt; 163; 0.33%	Christian Jobin (Note: Elected in a 2003 byelection after Antoine Dubé resigned to seek a seat in the National Assembly of Quebec.); Lévis-et-Chutes-de-la-Chaudière
Matapédia—Matane	Marc Bélanger; 9,653; 30.48%	Jean-Yves Roy; 17,878; 56.45%	Vahid Fortin-Vidah; 1,972; 6.23%	Jean-Guy Côté; 1,581; 4.99%	Nicolas Deville; 585; 1.85%		Jean-Yves Roy
Rimouski-Neigette—Témiscouata—Les Basques	Côme Roy; 9,161; 23.77%	Louise Thibault; 22,215; 57.63%	Denis Quimper; 3,445; 8.94%	Guy Caron; 2,717; 7.05%	Marjolaine Delaunière; 1,008; 2.62%		Suzanne Tremblay†; Rimouski—Neigette-et-La-Mitis
Rivière-du-Loup—Montmagny	Isabelle Mignault; 13,124; 29.61%	Paul Crête; 25,327; 57.13%	Marc-André Drolet; 4,040; 9.11%	Frédérick Garon; 876; 1.98%	André Clermont; 962; 2.17%		Paul Crête; Kamouraska—Rivière-du-Loup—Témiscouata—Les Basques
Rivière-du-Loup—Montmagny	Isabelle Mignault; 13,124; 29.61%	Paul Crête; 25,327; 57.13%	Marc-André Drolet; 4,040; 9.11%	Frédérick Garon; 876; 1.98%	André Clermont; 962; 2.17%		merged district
Rivière-du-Loup—Montmagny	Isabelle Mignault; 13,124; 29.61%	Paul Crête; 25,327; 57.13%	Marc-André Drolet; 4,040; 9.11%	Frédérick Garon; 876; 1.98%	André Clermont; 962; 2.17%		Gilbert Normand†; Bellechasse—Etchemins—Montmagny—L'Islet

==== Côte-Nord and Saguenay ====
Electoral district	Candidates						Incumbent
Electoral district	Liberal	BQ	Conservative	NDP	Green	Other	Incumbent
Charlevoix—Montmorency	Lisette Lepage; 8,598; 20.58%	Michel Guimond; 25,451; 60.91%	Guy-Léonard Tremblay; 5,259; 12.59%	Steeve Hudon; 1,055; 2.52%	Yves Jourdain; 1,422; 3.40%		Gérard Asselin; Charlevoix
Charlevoix—Montmorency	Lisette Lepage; 8,598; 20.58%	Michel Guimond; 25,451; 60.91%	Guy-Léonard Tremblay; 5,259; 12.59%	Steeve Hudon; 1,055; 2.52%	Yves Jourdain; 1,422; 3.40%		merged district
Charlevoix—Montmorency	Lisette Lepage; 8,598; 20.58%	Michel Guimond; 25,451; 60.91%	Guy-Léonard Tremblay; 5,259; 12.59%	Steeve Hudon; 1,055; 2.52%	Yves Jourdain; 1,422; 3.40%		Michel Guimond; Beauport—Montmorency—Côte-de-Beaupré—Île-d'Orléans
Chicoutimi—Le Fjord	André Harvey; 19,787; 43.43%	Robert Bouchard; 20,650; 45.33%	Alcide Boudreault; 2,385; 5.23%	Éric Dubois; 1,699; 3.73%	Paul Tremblay; 1,038; 2.28%		André Harvey
Jonquière—Alma	Daniel Giguère; 13,355; 29.12%	Sébastien Gagnon; 25,193; 54.93%	Gilles Lavoie; 2,217; 4.83%	François Picard; 1,561; 3.40%	Jean-Sébastien Busque; 679; 1.48%	Jocelyne Girard-Bujold (Ind.); 2,737; 5.97% ———— Michel Perron (Comm.); 121; 0.26%	Sébastien Gagnon; Lac-Saint-Jean—Saguenay
Jonquière—Alma	Daniel Giguère; 13,355; 29.12%	Sébastien Gagnon; 25,193; 54.93%	Gilles Lavoie; 2,217; 4.83%	François Picard; 1,561; 3.40%	Jean-Sébastien Busque; 679; 1.48%	Jocelyne Girard-Bujold (Ind.); 2,737; 5.97% ———— Michel Perron (Comm.); 121; 0.26%	merged district
Jonquière—Alma	Daniel Giguère; 13,355; 29.12%	Sébastien Gagnon; 25,193; 54.93%	Gilles Lavoie; 2,217; 4.83%	François Picard; 1,561; 3.40%	Jean-Sébastien Busque; 679; 1.48%	Jocelyne Girard-Bujold (Ind.); 2,737; 5.97% ———— Michel Perron (Comm.); 121; 0.26%	Jocelyne Girard-Bujold§ Jonquière
Manicouagan	Anthony Detroio; 8,097; 24.88%	Gérard Asselin; 19,040; 58.51%	Pierre Paradis; 1,601; 4.92%	Pierre Ducasse; 3,361; 10.33%	Les Parsons; 444; 1.36%		Ghislain Fournier†
Roberval	Michel Malette; 8,064; 23.19%	Michel Gauthier; 20,655; 59.41%	Ghislain Lavoie; 3,011; 8.66%	Isabelle Tremblay; 1,777; 5.11%	Marc-André Gauthier; 1,260; 3.62%		Michel Gauthier

==== Quebec City ====
Electoral district	Candidates						Incumbent
Electoral district	Liberal	BQ	Conservative	NDP	Green	Other	Incumbent
Beauport	Dennis Dawson; 11,866; 25.63%	Christian Simard; 22,989; 49.65%	Stephan Asselin; 7,388; 15.96%	Xavier Trégan; 1,896; 4.09%	Jeannine T. Desharnais; 1,577; 3.41%	Nicolas Frichot (Mar.); 585; 1.26%	new district
Charlesbourg	Jean-Marie Laliberté; 11,911; 25.73%	Richard Marceau; 23,886; 51.60%	Bertrand Proulx; 7,306; 15.78%	François Villeneuve; 1,623; 3.51%	Marilou Moisan-Domm; 1,188; 2.57%	Benjamin Kasapoglu (Mar.); 376; 0.81%	Richard Marceau; Charlesbourg—Jacques-Cartier
Louis-Hébert	**Hélène Chalifour Scherrer**; 18,999; 34.03%	Roger Clavet; 24,071; 43.11%	Clermont Gauthier; 7,512; 13.45%	Robert Turcotte; 3,112; 5.57%	Jean-Pierre Guay; 2,137; 3.83%		**Hélène Scherrer**
Louis-Saint-Laurent	Michel Fragasso; 10,025; 22.34%	Bernard Cleary; 17,248; 38.44%	Josée Verner; 13,967; 31.13%	Christopher Bojanowski; 1,369; 3.05%	Yonnel Bonaventure; 1,243; 2.77%	Jean-Guy Carignan (Ind.); 563 1.25%	Jean-Guy Carignan (Note: Jean-Guy Carignan was elected as a Liberal MP for the Quebec East riding in 2000 but left the Liberal caucus in December 2001. He rejoined the Liberal caucus for 2 days in October 2003, and sat as an Independent MP for the remainder of the 37th Parliament.); Quebec East
Louis-Saint-Laurent	Michel Fragasso; 10,025; 22.34%	Bernard Cleary; 17,248; 38.44%	Josée Verner; 13,967; 31.13%	Christopher Bojanowski; 1,369; 3.05%	Yonnel Bonaventure; 1,243; 2.77%	Henri Gauvin (Ind.); 332 0.74%	Jean-Guy Carignan; Quebec East
Louis-Saint-Laurent	Michel Fragasso; 10,025; 22.34%	Bernard Cleary; 17,248; 38.44%	Josée Verner; 13,967; 31.13%	Christopher Bojanowski; 1,369; 3.05%	Yonnel Bonaventure; 1,243; 2.77%	Dominique Théberge (Comm.); 119 0.27%	Jean-Guy Carignan; Quebec East
Québec	Jean-Philippe Côté; 12,982; 26.97%	Christiane Gagnon; 24,373; 50.63%	Pierre Gaudreault; 5,330; 11.07%	Jean-Marie Fiset; 2,670; 5.55%	Antonine Yaccarini; 2,046; 4.25%	Jean Bédard (M-L); 223 0.46%	Christiane Gagnon
Québec	Jean-Philippe Côté; 12,982; 26.97%	Christiane Gagnon; 24,373; 50.63%	Pierre Gaudreault; 5,330; 11.07%	Jean-Marie Fiset; 2,670; 5.55%	Antonine Yaccarini; 2,046; 4.25%	Pierre-Etienne Paradis (Mar.); 512 1.06%	Christiane Gagnon
Source: Elections Canada

==== Central Quebec ====
Electoral district	Candidates						Incumbent
Electoral district	Liberal	BQ	Conservative	NDP	Green	Marijuana	Incumbent
Berthier—Maskinongé	Laurier Thibault; 11,198; 22.79%	Guy André; 29,432; 59.90%	Ann Julie Fortier; 5,535; 11.27%	Denis McKinnon; 1,653; 3.36%	Eric Labrecque; 1,314; 2.67%		New district
Joliette	Jean-François Coderre; 10,975; 22.70%	Pierre A. Paquette; 30,661; 63.42%	Daniel Bouchard; 3,107; 6.43%	Jacques Trudeau; 1,755; 3.63%	Wendy Gorchinsky; 1,147; 2.37%	Marco Geoffroy; 701; 1.45%	Pierre Paquette
Lotbinière—Chutes-de-la-Chaudière	Anicet Gagné; 9,445; 21.45%	Odina Desrochers; 20,245; 45.99%	Jean Landry; 10,628; 24.14%	Jean Bernatchez; 2,091; 4.75%	Rama Borne MacDonald; 1,615; 3.67%		Odina Desrochers; Lotbinière—L'Érable
Montcalm	Daniel Brazeau; 7,915; 16.40%	Roger Gaudet; 34,383; 71.24%	Michel Paulette; 2,831; 5.87%	François Rivest; 1,531; 3.17%	Serge Bellemare; 1,606; 3.33%		Roger Gaudet; Berthier—Montcalm
Portneuf	Claude Duplain; 11,863; 27.56%	Guy Côté; 18,471; 42.91%	Howard M. Bruce; 9,251; 21.49%	Jean-François Breton; 1,540; 3.58%	Pierre Poulin; 1,925; 4.47%		Claude Duplain
Repentigny	Lévis Brien; 9,353; 18.25%	Benoît Sauvageau; 35,907; 70.06%	Allen F. MacKenzie; 2,447; 4.77%	André Cardinal; 1,526; 2.98%	Jean-François Léveque; 1,482; 2.89%	François Boudreau; 539; 1.05%	Benoît Sauvageau
Richelieu	Ghislaine Provencher; 11,045; 22.68%	Louis Plamondon; 31,497; 64.67%	Daniel A. Proulx; 3,726; 7.65%	Charles Bussières; 1,017; 2.09%	Jean-Pierre Bonenfant; 839; 1.72%	Daniel Blackburn; 580; 1.19%	Louis Plamondon; Bas-Richelieu—Nicolet—Bécancour
Saint-Maurice—Champlain	Marie-Eve Bilodeau; 14,320; 30.55%	Marcel Gagnon; 25,918; 55.29%	Martial Toupin; 4,129; 8.81%	Pierre J.C. Allard; 1,104; 2.36%	Pierre Cayou Audette; 855; 1.82%	Paul Giroux; 547; 1.17%	Vacant (Note: Formerly held by Liberal Jean Chrétien.); Saint-Maurice
Saint-Maurice—Champlain	Marie-Eve Bilodeau; 14,320; 30.55%	Marcel Gagnon; 25,918; 55.29%	Martial Toupin; 4,129; 8.81%	Pierre J.C. Allard; 1,104; 2.36%	Pierre Cayou Audette; 855; 1.82%	Paul Giroux; 547; 1.17%	merged district
Saint-Maurice—Champlain	Marie-Eve Bilodeau; 14,320; 30.55%	Marcel Gagnon; 25,918; 55.29%	Martial Toupin; 4,129; 8.81%	Pierre J.C. Allard; 1,104; 2.36%	Pierre Cayou Audette; 855; 1.82%	Paul Giroux; 547; 1.17%	Marcel Gagnon; Champlain
Trois-Rivières	Jean-Éric Guindon; 12,703; 27.36%	Paule Brunelle; 26,240; 56.51%	Jean-Guy Mercier; 4,381; 9.43%	Marc Tessier; 1,635; 3.52%	Linda Lavoie; 1,476; 3.18%		Yves Rocheleau†

==== Eastern Townships ====
Electoral district	Candidates					Incumbent
Electoral district	Liberal	BQ	Conservative	NDP	Green	Incumbent
Beauce	Claude Drouin; 19,592; 41.38%	Jean-François Barbe; 17,168; 36.26%	Alain Guay; 8,091; 17.09%	Philippe Giguère; 1,443; 3.05%	Michel Binette; 1,054; 2.23%	Claude Drouin
Brome—Missisquoi	**Denis Paradis**; 18,609; 42.08%	Christian Ouellet; 17,537; 39.66%	Peter Stastny; 4,888; 11.05%	Piper Huggins; 1,177; 2.66%	Louise Martineau; 2,011; 4.55%	**Denis Paradis**
Compton—Stanstead	David Price; 15,752; 35.97%	France Bonsant; 20,450; 46.70%	Gary Caldwell; 4,589; 10.48%	Martin Baller; 1,451; 3.31%	Laurier Busque; 1,546; 3.53%	David Price
Drummond	Roger Gougeon; 9,591; 22.81%	Pauline Picard; 23,670; 56.29%	Lyne Boisvert; 7,123; 16.94%	Blake Evans; 745; 1.77%	Louis Lacroix; 921; 2.19%	Pauline Picard
Mégantic—L'Érable	Gérard Binet; 15,778; 36.65%	Marc Boulianne; 19,264; 44.74%	Yves Mailly; 4,916; 11.42%	Alexandre Côté; 1,608; 3.73%	Bruno Vézina; 1,489; 3.46%	Gérard Binet; Frontenac—Mégantic
Richmond—Arthabaska	Christine St-Pierre; 12,809; 27.15%	André Bellavance; 26,211; 55.55%	Pierre Poissant; 4,925; 10.44%	Jason S. Noble; 1,540; 3.26%	Lucie Laforest; 1,699; 3.60%	André Bachand (Note: Elected as a PC in the 2000 federal election. Did not join the Conservative caucus and sat the rest of the 37th Parliament as an independent MP.)
Saint-Hyacinthe—Bagot	Michel Gaudette; 10,558; 22.12%	Yvan Loubier; 29,789; 62.40%	Andrée Champagne; 5,240; 10.98%	Joëlle Chevrier; 1,204; 2.52%	Bruno Godbout; 948; 1.99%	Yvan Loubier
Shefford	Diane St-Jacques; 18,725; 39.72%	Robert Vincent; 21,968; 46.60%	Jacques Parenteau; 3,732; 7.92%	Sonia Bisson; 1,146; 2.43%	Francine Brière; 1,571; 3.33%	Diane St-Jacques
Sherbrooke	Bruno-Marie Béchard; 15,482; 31.01%	Serge Cardin; 29,323; 58.74%	Réal Leblanc; 2,142; 4.29%	Philippe Dion; 1,463; 2.93%	Jeffrey Champagne; 1,509; 3.02%	Serge Cardin

==== Montérégie ====
Electoral district	Candidates						Incumbent
Electoral district	Liberal	BQ	Conservative	NDP	Green	Other	Incumbent
Beauharnois—Salaberry	Serge Marcil; 18,293; 34.62%	Alain Boire; 26,775; 50.67%	Dominique Bellemare; 4,864; 9.20%	Ligy Alakkattussery; 1,018; 1.93%	Rémi Pelletier; 1,415; 2.68%	Félix Malboeuf (Mar.); 480; 0.91%	Serge Marcil
Brossard—La Prairie	**Jacques Saada**; 24,155; 45.90%	Marcel Lussier; 21,596; 41.04%	Robert Nicolas; 3,107; 5.90%	Nadia Alexan; 2,321; 4.41%	Cécile Bissonnette; 1,340; 2.55%	Yves Le Seigle (M-L); 109; 0.21%	**Jacques Saada**
Chambly—Borduas	Sophie Joncas; 12,694; 22.75%	Yves Lessard; 33,945; 60.85%	Lucien Richard; 4,219; 7.56%	Daniel Blouin; 2,681; 4.81%	Benoit Lapointe; 2,248; 4.03%		Ghislain Lebel† (Note: Lebel formerly Bloc Québécois.); Chambly
Châteauguay—Saint-Constant	Robert Lanctôt; 15,384; 30.04%	Denise Poirier-Rivard; 29,337; 57.28%	Rosaire Turcot; 2,902; 5.67%	Mélanie Archambault; 1,704; 3.33%	Marc-André Gadoury; 1,889; 3.69%		Robert Lanctôt (Note: Lanctôt defected from the Bloc Québécois in December 2003.); Châteauguay
Longueuil	Robert Gladu; 12,363; 25.56%	Caroline St-Hilaire; 29,473; 60.94%	Richard Bélisle; 2,354; 4.87%	Nicole Fournier-Sylvester; 2,512; 5.19%	Michel Bédard; 1,263; 2.61%	David Fiset (Mar.); 401; 0.83%	Caroline St-Hilaire
Saint-Bruno—Saint-Hubert	Marc Savard; 15,457; 30.37%	Carole Lavallée; 28,050; 55.11%	Jean-François Mongeau; 3,189; 6.27%	Marie Henretta; 2,253; 4.43%	Janis Crawford; 1,349; 2.65%	David Vachon (Mar.); 596; 1.17%	Pierrette Venne† (Note: Venne is formerly Bloc Québécois.)
Saint-Jean	Michel Fecteau; 12,729; 25.95%	Claude Bachand; 29,485; 60.11%	Joseph Khoury; 3,856; 7.86%	Jonathan Trépanier; 1,687; 3.44%	Claude Genest; 1,298; 2.65%		Claude Bachand
Saint-Lambert	Yolande Thibeault; 16,654; 36.93%	Maka Kotto; 22,024; 48.84%	Patrick Clune; 2,739; 6.07%	Monique Garcia; 2,130; 4.72%	Diane Joubert; 1,404; 3.11%	Normand Fournier (M-L); 145; 0.32%	Yolande Thibeault
Vaudreuil-Soulanges	Nick Discepola; 21,613; 38.80%	Meili Faille; 24,675; 44.29%	Robert Ramage; 4,558; 8.18%	Bert Markgraf; 2,175; 3.90%	Julie C. Baribeau; 2,103; 3.77%	Charles Soucy (Mar.); 585; 1.05%	Nick Discepola
Verchères—Les-Patriotes	Nathalie Tousignant; 9,958; 20.20%	Stéphane Bergeron; 33,333; 67.62%	Francis-Pierre Rémillard; 2,750; 5.58%	Simon Vallée; 1,815; 3.68%	Philippe Morlighem; 975; 1.98%	Sébastien Drouin (Mar.); 463; 0.94%	Stéphane Bergeron

==== Eastern Montreal ====
Electoral district	Candidates								Incumbent
Electoral district	Liberal	BQ	Conservative	NDP	Green	Marijuana	Marxist-Leninist	Communist	Incumbent
Hochelaga	Benoit Bouvier; 11,712; 25.63%	Réal Ménard; 27,476; 60.12%	Mario Bernier; 1,856; 4.06%	David Gagnon; 2,510; 5.49%	Rolf Bramann; 1,361; 2.98%	Antoine Théorêt-Poupart; 482; 1.05%	Christine Dandenault; 112; 0.25%	Pierre Bibeau; 190; 0.42%	Réal Ménard; Hochelaga—Maisonneuve
Honoré-Mercier	Pablo Rodriguez; 22,223; 46.10%	Éric St-Hilaire; 19,461; 40.37%	Gianni Chiazzese; 2,902; 6.02%	François Pilon; 1,973; 4.09%	Richard Lahaie; 852; 1.77%	Steve Boudrias; 626; 1.30%	Hélène Héroux; 164; 0.34%		Yvon Charbonneau†; Anjou—Rivières-des-Prairies
La Pointe-de-l'Île	Jean-Claude Gobé; 10,593; 22.93%	Francine Lalonde; 30,713; 66.47%	Christian Prevost; 1,961; 4.24%	André Langevin; 1,751; 3.79%	Andre Levert; 1,186; 2.57%				Francine Lalonde; Mercier
Laurier	Jean-François Thibault; 8,454; 17.68%	**Gilles Duceppe**; 28,728; 60.07%	Pierre Albert; 1,224; 2.56%	François Gregoire; 5,779; 12.08%	Dylan Perceval-Maxwell; 2,912; 6.09%	Nicky Tanguay; 572; 1.20%	Ginette Boutet; 154; 0.32%		**Gilles Duceppe**; Laurier—Sainte-Marie
Rosemont—La Petite-Patrie	Christian Bolduc; 11,572; 22.90%	Bernard Bigras; 31,224; 61.80%	Michel Sauvé; 1,561; 3.09%	Benoît Beauchamp; 3,876; 7.67%	François Chevalier; 2,145; 4.25%			Kenneth Higham; 145; 0.29%	Bernard Bigras; Rosemont—Petite-Patrie

==== Western Montreal ====
Electoral district	Candidates								Incumbent
Electoral district	Liberal	BQ	Conservative	NDP	Green	Marijuana	Marxist-Leninist	Other	Incumbent
Jeanne-Le Ber	**Liza Frulla**; 18,766; 41.09%	Thierry St-Cyr; 18,694; 40.93%	Pierre-Albert Sévigny; 2,524; 5.53%	Anthony Philbin; 3,160; 6.92%	Jean Claude Mercier; 1,864; 4.08%	Cathy Duschene; 520; 1.14%	Normand Chouinard; 148; 0.32%		**Liza Frulla**; Verdun—Saint-Henri—Saint-Paul—Pointe Saint-Charles
Lac-Saint-Louis	Francis Scarpaleggia; 32,122; 63.91%	Maxime Côté; 5,106; 10.16%	Jeff Howard; 6,082; 12.10%	Daniel Quinn; 3,789; 7.54%	Peter Graham; 2,584; 5.14%	Patrick Cardinal; 578; 1.15%			Clifford Lincoln†
LaSalle—Émard	**Paul Martin**; 25,806; 56.55%	Thierry Larrivée; 14,001; 30.68%	Nicole Roy-Arcelin; 2,271; 4.98%	Rebecca Blaikie; 1,995; 4.37%	Douglas Jack; 1,000; 2.19%	**Marc-Boris St-Maurice**; 349; 0.76%	Jean-Paul Bédard; 210; 0.46%		**Paul Martin**
Mount Royal	**Irwin Cotler**; 28,670; 75.68%	Vincent Gagnon; 2,636; 6.96%	Matthew Fireman; 3,271; 8.63%	Sébastien Beaudet; 1,859; 4.91%	Adam Sommerfeld; 1,046; 2.76%	Adam Greenblatt; 308; 0.81%	Diane Johnston; 94; 0.25%		**Irwin Cotler**
Notre-Dame-de-Grâce—Lachine	Marlene Jennings; 23,552; 53.20%	Jean-Philippe Chartré; 9,736; 21.99%	William R. McCullock; 4,526; 10.22%	Maria Pia Chávez; 3,513; 7.93%	Jessica Gal; 2,214; 5.00%	Jay Dell; 479; 1.08%	Rachel Hoffman; 88; 0.20%	Earl Wertheimer (Libert.); 165; 0.37%	Marlene Jennings
Outremont	Jean Lapierre; 15,675; 40.94%	François Rebello; 12,730; 33.25%	Marc Rousseau; 2,284; 5.97%	Omar Aktouf; 5,382; 14.06%	Shaun Perceval-Maxwell; 1,643; 4.29%	Yan Lacombe; 452; 1.18%	Linda Sullivan; 120; 0.31%		Martin Cauchon†
Pierrefonds—Dollard	Bernard Patry; 29,601; 63.57%	Marie-Hélène Brunet; 7,426; 15.95%	Andrea Paine; 5,010; 10.76%	Danielle Lustgarten; 2,545; 5.47%	Theodore Kouretas; 1,401; 3.01%	Jean-François Labrecque; 511; 1.10%	Garnet Colly; 71; 0.15%		Bernard Patry
Saint-Laurent—Cartierville	Stéphane Dion; 28,107; 66.82%	William Fayad; 7,261; 17.26%	Marc Rahmé; 2,606; 6.20%	Zaid Mahayni; 2,630; 6.25%	Almaz Aladass; 875; 2.08%	Alex Neron; 298; 0.71%	Fernand Deschamps; 125; 0.30%	Ken Fernandez (CAP); 84 0.20%	Stéphane Dion
Saint-Laurent—Cartierville	Stéphane Dion; 28,107; 66.82%	William Fayad; 7,261; 17.26%	Marc Rahmé; 2,606; 6.20%	Zaid Mahayni; 2,630; 6.25%	Almaz Aladass; 875; 2.08%	Alex Neron; 298; 0.71%	Fernand Deschamps; 125; 0.30%	Nilda Vargas (Comm.); 78 0.19%	Stéphane Dion
Westmount—Ville-Marie	**Lucienne Robillard**; 22,337; 55.84%	Louis La Rochelle; 5,922; 14.81%	Robert Gervais; 4,027; 10.07%	Eric Wilson Steedman; 4,795; 11.99%	Brian Sarwer-Foner; 2,419; 6.05%	David John Proctor; 396; 0.99%	Serge Lachapelle; 103; 0.26%		**Lucienne Robillard**

==== Northern Montreal and Laval ====
Electoral district	Candidates								Incumbent
Electoral district	Liberal	BQ	Conservative	NDP	Green	Marijuana	Marxist-Leninist	Other	Incumbent
Ahuntsic	Eleni Bakopanos; 21,234; 43.76%	Maria Mourani; 20,020; 41.25%	Jean E. Fortier; 2,544; 5.24%	Annick Bergeron; 3,013; 6.21%	Lynette Tremblay; 1,301; 2.68%	F.X. De Longchamp; 314; 0.65%	Marsha Fine; 102; 0.21%		Eleni Bakopanos
Bourassa	**Denis Coderre**; 20,927; 50.03%	Doris Provencher; 15,794; 37.76%	Frédéric Grenier; 2,226; 5.32%	Stefano Saykaly; 1,661; 3.97%	Noémi Lopinto; 660; 1.58%	Philippe Gauvin; 403; 0.96%	Geneviève Royer; 154; 0.37%		**Denis Coderre**
Papineau	**Pierre Pettigrew**; 16,892; 41.10%	Martine Carrière; 16,424; 39.96%	Mustaque Sarker; 1,961; 4.77%	André Frappier; 3,603; 8.77%	Adam Jastrzebski; 1,058; 2.57%	Christelle Dusablon-Pelletier; 490; 1.19%	Peter Macrisopoulos; 169; 0.41%	Jimmy Garoufalis (Ind.); 250 0.61%	**Pierre Pettigrew**; Papineau—Saint-Denis
Papineau	**Pierre Pettigrew**; 16,892; 41.10%	Martine Carrière; 16,424; 39.96%	Mustaque Sarker; 1,961; 4.77%	André Frappier; 3,603; 8.77%	Adam Jastrzebski; 1,058; 2.57%	Christelle Dusablon-Pelletier; 490; 1.19%	Peter Macrisopoulos; 169; 0.41%	André Parizeau (Comm.); 252 0.61%	**Pierre Pettigrew**; Papineau—Saint-Denis
Saint-Léonard—Saint-Michel	Massimo Pacetti; 25,884; 63.90%	Paul-Alexis François; 8,852; 21.85%	Payam Eslami; 2,138; 5.28%	Laura Colella; 2,422; 5.98%	Ricardo Fellicetti; 944; 2.33%		Stéphane Chénier; 267; 0.66%		Massimo Pacetti

==== Laurentides, Outaouais and Northern Quebec ====
Electoral district	Candidates						Incumbent
Electoral district	Liberal	BQ	Conservative	NDP	Green	Other	Incumbent
Abitibi—Témiscamingue	Gilbert Barrette; 13,457; 30.98%	Marc Lemay; 25,041; 57.66%	Bernard Hugues Beauchesne; 2,425; 5.58%	Dennis Shushack; 1,472; 3.39%	Patrick Rancourt; 1,037; 2.39%		Gilbert Barrette; Témiscamingue
Argenteuil—Mirabel	Yves Sabourin; 13,214; 26.87%	Mario Laframboise; 28,228; 57.40%	David H. McArthur; 3,460; 7.04%	Elisabeth Clark; 1,493; 3.04%	Claude Sabourin; 2,510; 5.10%	Laurent Filion (CHP); 202 0.41%	Mario Laframboise; Argenteuil—Mirabel
Argenteuil—Mirabel	Yves Sabourin; 13,214; 26.87%	Mario Laframboise; 28,228; 57.40%	David H. McArthur; 3,460; 7.04%	Elisabeth Clark; 1,493; 3.04%	Claude Sabourin; 2,510; 5.10%	Michael O'Grady (M-L); 69 0.14%	Mario Laframboise; Argenteuil—Mirabel
Gatineau	Françoise Boivin; 19,198; 42.09%	Richard Nadeau; 18,368; 40.27%	Gérald Nicolas; 3,461; 7.59%	Dominique Vaillancourt; 2,610; 5.72%	Brian Gibb; 1,402; 3.07%	Gabriel Girard-Bernier (M-L); 125 0.27%	Mark Assad†
Gatineau	Françoise Boivin; 19,198; 42.09%	Richard Nadeau; 18,368; 40.27%	Gérald Nicolas; 3,461; 7.59%	Dominique Vaillancourt; 2,610; 5.72%	Brian Gibb; 1,402; 3.07%	Stephane Salko (Mar.); 453 0.99%	Mark Assad†
Hull—Aylmer	Marcel Proulx; 20,135; 41.87%	Alain Charette; 15,626; 32.49%	Pierrette Bellefeuille; 3,963; 8.24%	Pierre Laliberté; 5,709; 11.87%	Gail Walker; 2,561; 5.33%	Christian Legeais (M-L); 98; 0.20%	Marcel Proulx
Laurentides—Labelle	Dominique Boyer; 14,459; 29.43%	Johanne Deschamps; 28,675; 58.38%	Guillaume Desjardins; 2,887; 5.88%	Brendan Naef; 1,320; 2.69%	Jacques Léger; 1,781; 3.63%		new district
Nunavik—Eeyou	Guy St-Julien; 12,006; 43.17%	Yvon Lévesque; 12,578; 45.23%	François Dionne; 1,265; 4.55%	Pierre Corbeil; 1,097; 3.94%	Martin Fournier; 862; 3.10%		Guy St-Julien; Abitibi—Baie-James—Nunavik
Pontiac	David Smith; 15,358; 38.36%	L-Hubert Leduc; 11,685; 29.19%	Judith Grant; 8,869; 22.15%	Gretchen Schwarz; 2,317; 5.79%	Thierry Vicente; 1,673; 4.18%	Benoit Legros (M-L); 132; 0.33%	Robert Bertrand§ Pontiac—Gatineau—Labelle
Rivière-des-Mille-Îles	Yolaine Savignac; 11,025; 24.18%	Gilles-A. Perron; 27,993; 61.39%	Érick Gauthier; 3,064; 6.72%	Nicolas Du Cap; 1,559; 3.42%	Marie Martine Bédard; 1,961; 4.30%		Gilles-A. Perron
Rivière-du-Nord	Lorraine Auclair; 9,509; 21.60%	Monique Guay; 29,204; 66.33%	Catherine Brousseau; 2,435; 5.53%	François Côté; 1,290; 2.93%	Marcel Poirier; 1,129; 2.56%	Christian Marcoux (Mar.); 459; 1.04%	Monique Guay; Laurentides
Terrebonne—Blainville	Pierre Gingras; 9,048; 19.70%	Diane Bourgeois; 31,288; 68.13%	Patrick Légaré; 2,582; 5.62%	Normand Beaudet; 1,451; 3.16%	Martin Drapeau; 1,554; 3.38%		Diane Bourgeois

=== Ontario ===

Ontario was predicted to be the battle ground of this election. Most pundits believed that this is where the election was lost for the Conservatives. Ontario is home to more than one third of all of Canada's ridings. In the last three elections, right wing vote splitting has resulted in just six riding losses for the Liberals, compared to 299 riding wins. However, the Canadian Alliance and the Progressive Conservatives have merged, and they should win many seats in Ontario, especially in rural ridings in midwestern Ontario, Central-eastern Ontario, and Central Ontario. The NDP has some support in various pockets in Ontario in the past, but has only won one riding in the last three elections, and one more in a by-election, both in Windsor. However, the NDP was expected to do well not only in Windsor, but in Hamilton, Downtown Toronto, Ottawa Centre, and possibly even in Northern Ontario.

==== Ottawa ====
Electoral district	Candidates							Incumbent
Electoral district	Liberal	Conservative	NDP	Green	Marijuana	Marxist-Leninist	Other	Incumbent
Carleton—Lanark	Dan Wicklum; 22,185; 33.99%	Gordon O'Connor; 32,664; 50.04%	Rick Prashaw; 6,758; 10.35%	Stuart Langstaff; 3,665; 5.61%				New district
Nepean—Carleton	**David Pratt**; 26,684; 40.05%	Pierre Poilievre; 30,420; 45.66%	Phil Brown; 6,072; 9.11%	Chris Walker; 2,886; 4.33%	Brad Powers; 561; 0.84%			**David Pratt**
Ottawa Centre	Richard Mahoney; 19,478; 31.07%	Mike Murphy; 11,933; 19.04%	Ed Broadbent; 25,734; 41.05%	David Chernushenko; 4,730; 7.55%	Michael Foster; 455; 0.73%	Louis Lang; 67; 0.11%	Carla Marie Dancey (CAP); 76 0.12%	Vacant (Note: Previously held by Liberal Mac Harb)
Ottawa Centre	Richard Mahoney; 19,478; 31.07%	Mike Murphy; 11,933; 19.04%	Ed Broadbent; 25,734; 41.05%	David Chernushenko; 4,730; 7.55%	Michael Foster; 455; 0.73%	Louis Lang; 67; 0.11%	Robert G. Gauthier (Ind.); 121 0.19%	Vacant
Ottawa Centre	Richard Mahoney; 19,478; 31.07%	Mike Murphy; 11,933; 19.04%	Ed Broadbent; 25,734; 41.05%	David Chernushenko; 4,730; 7.55%	Michael Foster; 455; 0.73%	Louis Lang; 67; 0.11%	Stuart Ryan (Comm.); 90 0.14%	Vacant
Ottawa—Orléans	Marc Godbout; 26,383; 44.99%	Walter Robinson; 23,655; 40.34%	Crystal Leblanc; 5,905; 10.07%	Dan Biocchi; 2,699; 4.60%				Eugène Bellemare†
Ottawa South	David McGuinty; 25,956; 43.82%	Alan Riddell; 20,622; 34.82%	Monia Mazigh; 8,080; 13.64%	John Ford; 3,398; 5.74%	John Akpata; 495; 0.84%	Saroj Bains; 79; 0.13%	Raymond Aubin (Ind.); 225 0.38%	John Paul Manley†
Ottawa South	David McGuinty; 25,956; 43.82%	Alan Riddell; 20,622; 34.82%	Monia Mazigh; 8,080; 13.64%	John Ford; 3,398; 5.74%	John Akpata; 495; 0.84%	Saroj Bains; 79; 0.13%	Brad Thomson (PC); 375 0.63%	John Paul Manley†
Ottawa—Vanier	**Mauril Bélanger**; 25,952; 49.17%	Kevin Friday; 12,769; 24.19%	Ric Dagenais; 9,787; 18.54%	Raphaël Thierrin; 3,628; 6.87%	Carol Taylor; 558; 1.06%	Françoise Roy; 85; 0.16%		**Mauril Bélanger**
Ottawa West—Nepean	Marlene Catterall; 23,971; 41.78%	Sean Casey; 22,591; 39.37%	Marlene Rivier; 7,449; 12.98%	Neil Adair; 2,748; 4.79%	Russell Barth; 430; 0.75%	Alexandre Legeais; 68; 0.12%	Mary-Sue Haliburton (CAP); 121; 0.21%	Marlene Catterall

==== Eastern Ontario ====
Electoral district	Candidates					Incumbent
Electoral district	Liberal	Conservative	NDP	Green	Other	Incumbent
Glengarry— Prescott—Russell	Don Boudria; 23,921; 47.86%	Alain Lalonde; 18,729; 37.47%	Martin Cauvier; 4,238; 8.48%	Roy Fjarlie; 2,634; 5.27%	Tim Bloedow (CHP); 464; 0.93%	Don Boudria
Kingston and the Islands	Peter Milliken; 28,544; 52.45%	Blair MacLean; 12,582; 23.12%	Rob Hutchison; 8,964; 16.47%	Janina Fisher Balfour; 3,339; 6.13%	Rosie The Clown Elston (Ind.); 237 0.44%	Peter Milliken
Kingston and the Islands	Peter Milliken; 28,544; 52.45%	Blair MacLean; 12,582; 23.12%	Rob Hutchison; 8,964; 16.47%	Janina Fisher Balfour; 3,339; 6.13%	Terry Marshall (CHP); 481 0.88%	Peter Milliken
Kingston and the Islands	Peter Milliken; 28,544; 52.45%	Blair MacLean; 12,582; 23.12%	Rob Hutchison; 8,964; 16.47%	Janina Fisher Balfour; 3,339; 6.13%	Don Rogers (CAP); 179 0.33%	Peter Milliken
Kingston and the Islands	Peter Milliken; 28,544; 52.45%	Blair MacLean; 12,582; 23.12%	Rob Hutchison; 8,964; 16.47%	Janina Fisher Balfour; 3,339; 6.13%	Karl Eric Walker (Ind.); 100 0.18%	Peter Milliken
Lanark—Frontenac— Lennox and Addington	Larry McCormick; 17,507; 30.97%	Scott Jeffrey Reid; 27,566; 48.77%	Ross Sutherland; 7,418; 13.12%	John Baranyi; 2,736; 4.84%	George Walter Kolaczynski (Mar.); 479 0.85% Bill Vankoughnet (Ind.); 820 1.45%	Larry McCormick
Lanark—Frontenac— Lennox and Addington	Larry McCormick; 17,507; 30.97%	Scott Jeffrey Reid; 27,566; 48.77%	Ross Sutherland; 7,418; 13.12%	John Baranyi; 2,736; 4.84%	George Walter Kolaczynski (Mar.); 479 0.85% Bill Vankoughnet (Ind.); 820 1.45%	merged district
Lanark—Frontenac— Lennox and Addington	Larry McCormick; 17,507; 30.97%	Scott Jeffrey Reid; 27,566; 48.77%	Ross Sutherland; 7,418; 13.12%	John Baranyi; 2,736; 4.84%	George Walter Kolaczynski (Mar.); 479 0.85% Bill Vankoughnet (Ind.); 820 1.45%	Scott Reid
Leeds—Grenville	Joe Jordan; 16,967; 32.93%	Gord Brown; 26,002; 50.46%	Steve Armstrong; 5,834; 11.32%	Chris Bradshaw; 2,722; 5.28%		Joe Jordan
Prince Edward—Hastings	Bruce Knutson; 20,042; 37.57%	Daryl Kramp; 22,598; 42.36%	Dan Douglas; 8,105; 15.19%	Tom Lawson; 2,130; 3.99%	Joseph Sahadat (Ind.); 468; 0.88%	Lyle Vanclief†
Renfrew—Nipissing— Pembroke	Rob Jamieson; 14,798; 29.65%	Cheryl Gallant; 27,494; 55.08%	Sue McSheffrey; 5,720; 11.46%	Gordon S McLeod; 1,191; 2.39%	Stanley Sambey (Mar.); 714; 1.43%	Cheryl Gallant
Stormont—Dundas— South Glengarry	Bob Kilger; 17,779; 36.78%	Guy Lauzon; 21,678; 44.85%	Elaine MacDonald; 5,387; 11.15%	Tom Manley; 3,491; 7.22%		Bob Kilger

==== Central Ontario ====
Electoral district	Candidates						Incumbent
Electoral district	Liberal	Conservative	NDP	Green	Christian Heritage	Other	Incumbent
Barrie	**Aileen Carroll**; 21,233; 42.66%	Patrick Brown; 19,938; 40.06%	Peter Bursztyn; 5,312; 10.67%	Erich Jacoby-Hawkins; 3,288; 6.61%			**Aileen Carroll**; Barrie—Simcoe—Bradford
Clarington—Scugog—Uxbridge	Tim Lang; 19,548; 38.27%	Bev Oda; 20,813; 40.74%	Bruce Rogers; 7,721; 15.11%	Virginia Ervin; 2,085; 4.08%	Durk Bruinsma; 915; 1.79%		Alex Shepherd; Durham
Dufferin—Caledon	Murray Calder; 17,557; 39.00%	David Tilson; 19,270; 42.81%	Rita Landry; 3,798; 8.44%	Ted Alexander; 3,947; 8.77%	Ursula Ellis; 443; 0.98%		Murray Calder; Dufferin—Peel—Wellington—Grey
Grey—Bruce—Owen Sound	Ovid Jackson; 17,824; 35.78%	Larry Miller; 22,411; 44.99%	Sebastian Ostertag; 6,516; 13.08%	Alex Drossos; 2,076; 4.17%	Steven J. Taylor; 982; 1.97%		Ovid Jackson
Haliburton—Kawartha Lakes—Brock	John O'Reilly; 19,294; 34.51%	Barry Devolin; 24,731; 44.23%	Gil J. McElroy; 8,427; 15.07%	Tim Holland; 2,637; 4.72%	Peter Vogel; 493; 0.88%	Charles Olito (Ind.); 330; 0.59%	John O'Reilly; Haliburton—Victoria—Brock
Newmarket—Aurora	Martha Hall Findlay; 21,129; 41.08%	Belinda Stronach; 21,818; 42.42%	Ed Chudak; 5,111; 9.94%	Daryl Wyatt; 2,298; 4.47%		Dorian Baxter (PC); 1,079; 2.10%	New district
Northumberland—Quinte West	Paul Macklin; 22,989; 39.85%	Doug Galt; 22,676; 39.31%	Russ Christianson; 9,007; 15.61%	Steve Haylestrom; 3,016; 5.23%			Paul Macklin; Northumberland
Peterborough	Peter Adams; 25,099; 43.55%	James Jackson; 18,393; 31.92%	Linda Slavin; 10,957; 19.01%	Brent Wood; 3,182; 5.52%			Peter Adams
Simcoe—Grey	Paul Bonwick; 22,396; 40.44%	Helena Guergis; 22,496; 40.62%	Colin Mackinnon; 5,532; 9.99%	Peter Ellis; 2,668; 4.82%	Peter Vander Zaag; 2,285; 4.13%		Paul Bonwick
Simcoe North	Paul DeVillers; 23,664; 43.36%	Peter Stock; 20,570; 37.69%	Jen Hill; 6,162; 11.29%	Mary Lou Kirby; 3,486; 6.39%	Adrian Kooger; 544; 1.00%	Ian Woods (CAP); 145; 0.27%	Paul DeVillers
York—Simcoe	Kate Wilson; 16,763; 35.47%	Peter Van Loan; 21,343; 45.17%	Sylvia Gerl; 5,314; 11.25%	Bob Burrows; 2,576; 5.45%	Vicki Gunn; 588; 1.24%	Stephen Sircelj (PC); 670; 1.42%	Karen Kraft Sloan; York North

==== Southern Durham and York ====
Profile & Notes	Electoral History
This sprawling and rapidly growing suburban area to the north and east of the City of Toronto encompasses the eastern portion of what Canadian political watchers in the early nineties dubbed the "905 belt"—a swath of middle class suburban voters roughly corresponding to the same boundaries of the 905 Area Code that can be readily tipped from the Liberal to the Conservative column. 905's buy-in on the provincial level to Mike Harris's Common Sense Revolution secured him two conservative majority governments, while its rejection of the Tories in 2002 paved the way for Dalton McGuinty's landslide. 905 solidly supported the Chrétien Liberals, but Conservatives hope that the absence of vote-splitting and rising national fortunes can lead to substantial pickups on election night.	•••••••••	2004
	•••••••	2000
	•••••••	1997
	••••	1993
	••••	1988
	•••	1984
	•••	1980
	•••	1979

Electoral district	Candidates					Incumbent
Electoral district	Liberal	Conservative	NDP	Green	Other	Incumbent
Ajax—Pickering	Mark Holland; 21,706; 49.77%	René Soetens; 14,666; 33.63%	Kevin Modeste; 5,286; 12.12%	Karen MacDonald; 1,951; 4.47%		new district
Markham—Unionville	**John McCallum**; 30,442; 66.31%	Joe Li; 10,325; 22.49%	Janice Hagan; 3,993; 8.70%	Ed Wong; 1,148; 2.50%		**John McCallum**
Oak Ridges—Markham	Lui Temelkovski; 31,964; 51.73%	Bob Callow; 20,712; 33.52%	Pamela Courtot; 5,430; 8.79%	Bernadette Manning; 2,406; 3.89%	Jim Conrad (PC); 820 1.33%	new district
Oak Ridges—Markham	Lui Temelkovski; 31,964; 51.73%	Bob Callow; 20,712; 33.52%	Pamela Courtot; 5,430; 8.79%	Bernadette Manning; 2,406; 3.89%	Maurice G Whittle (CHP); 458 0.74%	new district
Oshawa	Louise V. Parkes; 14,510; 30.47%	Colin Carrie; 15,815; 33.21%	Sid Ryan; 15,352; 32.24%	Liisa Whalley; 1,850; 3.89%	Tim Sullivan (M-L); 91; 0.19%	Ivan Grose§
Pickering—Scarborough East	Dan McTeague; 27,312; 56.98%	Tim Dobson; 13,417; 27.99%	Gary Dale; 5,392; 11.25%	Matthew Pollesel; 1,809; 3.77%		Dan McTeague
Richmond Hill	Bryon Wilfert; 27,102; 58.48%	Pete Merrifield; 11,530; 24.88%	C. Nella Cotrupi; 4,495; 9.70%	Tim Rudkins; 2,144; 4.63%	Ellena Lam (PC); 1,074; 2.32%	Bryon Wilfert
Thornhill	Susan Kadis; 28,709; 54.58%	Josh Cooper; 18,125; 34.46%	Rick Morelli; 3,671; 6.98%	Lloyd Helferty; 1,622; 3.08%	Benjamin Fitzerman (Ind.); 241 0.46%	Elinor Caplan†
Thornhill	Susan Kadis; 28,709; 54.58%	Josh Cooper; 18,125; 34.46%	Rick Morelli; 3,671; 6.98%	Lloyd Helferty; 1,622; 3.08%	Simion Iron (Ind.); 233 0.44%	Elinor Caplan†
Vaughan	Maurizio Bevilacqua; 31,430; 62.96%	Joe Spina; 11,821; 23.68%	Octavia Beckles; 4,371; 8.76%	Russell Korus; 1,722; 3.45%	Walter Aolari (CAP); 192 0.38%	Maurizio Bevilacqua
Vaughan	Maurizio Bevilacqua; 31,430; 62.96%	Joe Spina; 11,821; 23.68%	Octavia Beckles; 4,371; 8.76%	Russell Korus; 1,722; 3.45%	Paolo Fabrizio (Libert.); 388 0.78%	Maurizio Bevilacqua
Whitby—Oshawa	Judi Longfield; 25,649; 45.04%	Ian MacNeil; 20,531; 36.06%	Maret Sadem-Thompson; 8,002; 14.05%	Michael MacDonald; 2,759; 4.85%		Judi Longfield

==== Central Toronto ====
Profile & Notes	Electoral History
Since 1993, Central Toronto has been a bastion of Liberal support. It is far more competitive in the 2004 election, however, largely because new NDP leader Jack Layton is a former Toronto city councillor who has reoriented the NDP towards drawing support in the urban centres. Most of the ridings are remain safe Liberal seats, with only four or five seats vulnerable to the New Democrats and Conservatives.	••••••••••	2004
Since 1993, Central Toronto has been a bastion of Liberal support. It is far more competitive in the 2004 election, however, largely because new NDP leader Jack Layton is a former Toronto city councillor who has reoriented the NDP towards drawing support in the urban centres. Most of the ridings are remain safe Liberal seats, with only four or five seats vulnerable to the New Democrats and Conservatives.	••••••••••	2000
Since 1993, Central Toronto has been a bastion of Liberal support. It is far more competitive in the 2004 election, however, largely because new NDP leader Jack Layton is a former Toronto city councillor who has reoriented the NDP towards drawing support in the urban centres. Most of the ridings are remain safe Liberal seats, with only four or five seats vulnerable to the New Democrats and Conservatives.	••••••••••	1997
Since 1993, Central Toronto has been a bastion of Liberal support. It is far more competitive in the 2004 election, however, largely because new NDP leader Jack Layton is a former Toronto city councillor who has reoriented the NDP towards drawing support in the urban centres. Most of the ridings are remain safe Liberal seats, with only four or five seats vulnerable to the New Democrats and Conservatives.	••••••••••	1993
Since 1993, Central Toronto has been a bastion of Liberal support. It is far more competitive in the 2004 election, however, largely because new NDP leader Jack Layton is a former Toronto city councillor who has reoriented the NDP towards drawing support in the urban centres. Most of the ridings are remain safe Liberal seats, with only four or five seats vulnerable to the New Democrats and Conservatives.	••••••••••	1988
Since 1993, Central Toronto has been a bastion of Liberal support. It is far more competitive in the 2004 election, however, largely because new NDP leader Jack Layton is a former Toronto city councillor who has reoriented the NDP towards drawing support in the urban centres. Most of the ridings are remain safe Liberal seats, with only four or five seats vulnerable to the New Democrats and Conservatives.	•••••••••••	1984
Since 1993, Central Toronto has been a bastion of Liberal support. It is far more competitive in the 2004 election, however, largely because new NDP leader Jack Layton is a former Toronto city councillor who has reoriented the NDP towards drawing support in the urban centres. Most of the ridings are remain safe Liberal seats, with only four or five seats vulnerable to the New Democrats and Conservatives.	•••••••••••	1980
Since 1993, Central Toronto has been a bastion of Liberal support. It is far more competitive in the 2004 election, however, largely because new NDP leader Jack Layton is a former Toronto city councillor who has reoriented the NDP towards drawing support in the urban centres. Most of the ridings are remain safe Liberal seats, with only four or five seats vulnerable to the New Democrats and Conservatives.	•••••••••••	1979

Electoral district	Candidates							Incumbent
Electoral district	Liberal	Conservative	NDP	Green	Marijuana	Marxist-Leninist	Other	Incumbent
Beaches—East York	Maria Minna; 22,494; 47.93%	Nick Nikopoulos; 6,603; 14.07%	Peter Tabuns; 15,156; 32.29%	Peter Davison; 2,127; 4.53%	Daniel Dufresne; 365; 0.78%	Roger Carter; 46; 0.10%	**Miguel Figueroa** (Comm.); 62 0.13%	Maria Minna
Beaches—East York	Maria Minna; 22,494; 47.93%	Nick Nikopoulos; 6,603; 14.07%	Peter Tabuns; 15,156; 32.29%	Peter Davison; 2,127; 4.53%	Daniel Dufresne; 365; 0.78%	Roger Carter; 46; 0.10%	Edward Slota (Ind.); 80 0.17%	Maria Minna
Davenport	Mario Silva; 16,773; 50.69%	Theresa Rodrigues; 3,077; 9.30%	Rui Pires; 11,292; 34.13%	Mark O'Brien; 1,384; 4.18%	Elmer Gale; 251; 0.76%	Sarah Thompson; 79; 0.24%	Johan Boyden (Comm.); 137 0.41%	Charles Caccia†
Davenport	Mario Silva; 16,773; 50.69%	Theresa Rodrigues; 3,077; 9.30%	Rui Pires; 11,292; 34.13%	Mark O'Brien; 1,384; 4.18%	Elmer Gale; 251; 0.76%	Sarah Thompson; 79; 0.24%	John Riddell (CAP); 97 0.29%	Charles Caccia†
Don Valley West	John Godfrey; 30,615; 59.79%	David Turnbull; 14,495; 28.31%	David Thomas; 4,393; 8.58%	Serge Abbat; 1,703; 3.33%				John Godfrey
Eglinton—Lawrence	**Joseph Volpe**; 28,360; 60.24%	Bernie Tanz; 11,792; 25.05%	Max Silverman; 4,886; 10.38%	Shel Goldstein; 1,924; 4.09%			Corrinne Prévost (CAP); 115; 0.24%	**Joe Volpe**
Parkdale—High Park	Sarmite (Sam) Bulte; 19,727; 42.05%	Jurij Klufas; 7,221; 15.39%	Peggy Nash; 16,201; 34.53%	Neil Spiegel; 3,249; 6.93%	Terry Parker; 384; 0.82%	Lorne Gershuny; 130; 0.28%		Sarmite Bulte
St. Paul's	**Carolyn Bennett**; 32,171; 58.39%	Barry Cline; 11,226; 20.38%	Norman Tobias; 8,667; 15.73%	Peter Elgie; 3,031; 5.50%				**Carolyn Bennett**
Toronto Centre	**Bill Graham**; 30,336; 56.53%	Megan Harris; 7,936; 14.79%	Michael Shapcott; 12,747; 23.75%	Gabriel Draven; 2,097; 3.91%	Jay Wagner; 313; 0.58%	Philip Fernandez; 65; 0.12%	Dan Goldstick (Comm.); 106 0.20%	**Bill Graham**
Toronto Centre	**Bill Graham**; 30,336; 56.53%	Megan Harris; 7,936; 14.79%	Michael Shapcott; 12,747; 23.75%	Gabriel Draven; 2,097; 3.91%	Jay Wagner; 313; 0.58%	Philip Fernandez; 65; 0.12%	Kevin Peck (CAP); 63 0.12%	**Bill Graham**
Toronto—Danforth	Dennis Mills; 19,803; 41.34%	Loftus Cuddy; 2,975; 6.21%	**Jack Layton**; 22,198; 46.34%	**Jim Harris**; 2,575; 5.38%	Scott Yee; 265; 0.55%	Marcell Rodden; 84; 0.18%		Dennis Mills
Trinity—Spadina	Tony Ianno; 23,202; 43.55%	David Watters; 4,605; 8.64%	Olivia Chow; 22,397; 42.04%	Mark Viitala; 2,259; 4.24%		Nick Lin; 102; 0.19%	Tristan Alexander Downe-Dewdney (CAP); 91 0.17%	Tony Ianno
Trinity—Spadina	Tony Ianno; 23,202; 43.55%	David Watters; 4,605; 8.64%	Olivia Chow; 22,397; 42.04%	Mark Viitala; 2,259; 4.24%		Nick Lin; 102; 0.19%	Asif Hossain (PC); 531 1.00%	Tony Ianno
Trinity—Spadina	Tony Ianno; 23,202; 43.55%	David Watters; 4,605; 8.64%	Olivia Chow; 22,397; 42.04%	Mark Viitala; 2,259; 4.24%		Nick Lin; 102; 0.19%	Daniel Knezetic (NA); 89 0.17%	Tony Ianno
York South—Weston	Alan Tonks; 20,537; 59.83%	Stephen Halicki; 5,133; 14.95%	Paul Ferreira; 7,281; 21.21%	Jessica Fracassi; 1,199; 3.49%			Shirley Hawley (Comm.); 175; 0.51%	Alan Tonks

==== Suburban Toronto ====
Electoral district	Candidates					Incumbent
Electoral district	Liberal	Conservative	NDP	Green	Other	Incumbent
Don Valley East	Yasmin Ratansi; 21,864; 54.62%	David Johnson; 11,206; 27.99%	Valerie Mah; 5,287; 13.21%	Dan King; 1,172; 2.93%	Christopher Black (Comm.); 149 0.37%	David Collenette†
Don Valley East	Yasmin Ratansi; 21,864; 54.62%	David Johnson; 11,206; 27.99%	Valerie Mah; 5,287; 13.21%	Dan King; 1,172; 2.93%	Ryan Kidd (CHP); 351 0.88%	David Collenette†
Etobicoke Centre	Borys Wrzesnewskyj; 30,441; 58.28%	Lida Preyma; 14,829; 28.39%	John Richmond; 5,174; 9.91%	Margo Pearson; 1,676; 3.21%	France Tremblay (M-L); 112; 0.21%	Vacant (Note: Formerly held by Allan Rock (Liberal).)
Etobicoke—Lakeshore	**Jean Augustine**; 24,909; 50.24%	John Capobianco; 15,159; 30.58%	Margaret Anne McHugh; 7,179; 14.48%	John Huculiak; 2,201; 4.44%	Janice Murray (M-L); 129; 0.26%	**Jean Augustine**
Etobicoke North	Roy Cullen; 19,450; 63.32%	Rupinder Nannar; 5,737; 18.68%	Cesar Martello; 3,761; 12.24%	Mir Kamal; 605; 1.97%	Anna Di Carlo (M-L); 195 0.63%	Roy Cullen
Etobicoke North	Roy Cullen; 19,450; 63.32%	Rupinder Nannar; 5,737; 18.68%	Cesar Martello; 3,761; 12.24%	Mir Kamal; 605; 1.97%	George Szebik (Ind.); 309 1.01%	Roy Cullen
Etobicoke North	Roy Cullen; 19,450; 63.32%	Rupinder Nannar; 5,737; 18.68%	Cesar Martello; 3,761; 12.24%	Mir Kamal; 605; 1.97%	William Ubbens (CHP); 661 2.15%	Roy Cullen
Scarborough—Agincourt	Jim Karygiannis; 26,400; 64.08%	Andrew Faust; 8,649; 20.99%	D'Arcy Palmer; 4,182; 10.15%	Wayne Yeechong; 919; 2.23%	Tony J. Karadimas (PC); 1,048; 2.54%	Jim Karygiannis
Scarborough Centre	John Cannis; 20,740; 56.65%	John Mihtis; 8,515; 23.26%	Greg Gogan; 6,156; 16.82%	Greg Bonser; 1,045; 2.85%	Dorothy Sauras (Comm.); 152; 0.42%	John Cannis
Scarborough-Guildwood	John McKay; 20,950; 57.53%	Tom Varesh; 8,277; 22.73%	Sheila White; 5,885; 16.16%	Paul Charbonneau; 1,106; 3.04%	Brenda Thompson (CAP); 200; 0.55%	John McKay
Scarborough—Rouge River	Derek Lee; 22,564; 57.92%	Tony Backhurst; 5,184; 13.31%	Fauzia Khan; 3,635; 9.33%	Kathryn Holloway; 610; 1.57%	Raymond Cho (Ind.); 6,962; 17.87%	Derek Lee
Scarborough Southwest	Tom Wappel; 18,776; 49.46%	Heather Jewell; 9,028; 23.78%	Dan Harris; 8,471; 22.31%	Peter Van Dalen; 1,520; 4.00%	Elizabeth Rowley (Comm.); 168; 0.44%	Tom Wappel
Willowdale	**Jim Peterson**; 30,855; 61.39%	Jovan Boseovski; 11,615; 23.11%	Yvonne Bobb; 4,812; 9.57%	Sharolyn Vettese; 1,844; 3.67%	Ardavan Behrouzi (PC); 883 1.76%	**Jim Peterson**
Willowdale	**Jim Peterson**; 30,855; 61.39%	Jovan Boseovski; 11,615; 23.11%	Yvonne Bobb; 4,812; 9.57%	Sharolyn Vettese; 1,844; 3.67%	Bernadette Michael (Ind.); 253 0.50%	**Jim Peterson**
York Centre	Ken Dryden^{@} 21,520; 54.79%	Michael Mostyn; 10,318; 26.27%	Peter Flaherty; 5,376; 13.69%	Constantine Kritsonis; 1,240; 3.16%	Max Royz (Ind.); 824; 2.10%	Art Eggleton†
York West	**Judy Sgro**; 17,903; 64.74%	Leslie Soobrian; 3,120; 11.28%	Sandra Romano Anthony; 4,228; 15.29%	Tim McKellar; 824; 2.98%	Joseph Grubb (CHP); 1,580; 5.71%	**Judy Sgro**

==== Brampton, Mississauga and Oakville ====
Profile & Notes	Electoral History
This area is part of the rapidly growing 905 belt, where the Conservatives are hoping for a breakthrough, as it is a traditionally Conservative area. Until their collapse in 1993, the Conservatives only lost two ridings in this area between 1979 and 1988. In the riding of Brampton-Springdale, the Liberal riding association is campaigning for the NDP, to protest Paul Martin's appointment of candidate Ruby Dhalla. The original candidate was known to be a supporter of John Manley in last year's Liberal leadership race. Running against incumbent Colleen Beaumier in Brampton West is former Ontario cabinet minister and federal Conservative leadership candidate Tony Clement. Notes: ^{1} Hundal replaced previous Conservative candidate Gurjit Grewal after a past conviction for assault came to light.	•••••••••	2004
	••••••••	2000
	••••••••	1997
	•••••••	1993
	•••••••	1988
	•••	1984
	•••	1980
	•••	1979

Electoral district	Candidates					Incumbent
Electoral district	Liberal	Conservative	NDP	Green	Other	Incumbent
Bramalea—Gore—Malton	Gurbax S. Malhi; 20,394; 49.54%	Raminder Gill; 12,594; 30.59%	Fernando Miranda; 6,113; 14.85%	Sharleen McDowall; 1,832; 4.45%	Frank Chilelli (M-L); 237; 0.58%	Gurbax S. Malhi
Brampton—Springdale	Ruby Dhalla^{@} 19,385; 47.73%	Sam Hundal^{1} 11,182; 27.53%	Kathy Pounder; 8,038; 19.79%	Nick Hudson; 1,927; 4.74%	Gurdev Singh Mattu (Comm.); 86; 0.21%	Sarkis Assadourian†
Brampton West	Colleen Beaumier; 21,254; 45.30%	Tony Clement; 18,768; 40.00%	Chris Moise; 4,920; 10.49%	Sanjeev Goel; 1,603; 3.42%	Tom Bose (Ind.); 371; 0.79%	Colleen Beaumier
Mississauga—Brampton South	Navdeep Bains; 24,753; 57.16%	Parvinder Sandhu; 10,433; 24.09%	Larry Taylor; 6,411; 14.80%	Paul Simas; 1,525; 3.52%	David Gershuny (M-L); 185; 0.43%	new district
Mississauga East—Cooksville	**Albina Guarnieri**; 22,435; 56.70%	Riina DeFaria; 10,299; 26.03%	Jim Gill; 4,619; 11.67%	Jason Robert Hinchliffe; 1,167; 2.95%	Pierre Chénier (M-L); 154 0.39%	**Albina Guarnieri**
Mississauga East—Cooksville	**Albina Guarnieri**; 22,435; 56.70%	Riina DeFaria; 10,299; 26.03%	Jim Gill; 4,619; 11.67%	Jason Robert Hinchliffe; 1,167; 2.95%	Andrew Seitz (Ind.); 114 0.29%	**Albina Guarnieri**
Mississauga East—Cooksville	**Albina Guarnieri**; 22,435; 56.70%	Riina DeFaria; 10,299; 26.03%	Jim Gill; 4,619; 11.67%	Jason Robert Hinchliffe; 1,167; 2.95%	Sally Wong (CHP); 778 1.97%	**Albina Guarnieri**
Mississauga—Erindale	Carolyn Parrish; 28,246; 54.37%	Bob Dechert; 16,600; 31.95%	Simon Black; 5,104; 9.82%	Jeff Brownridge; 1,855; 3.57%	David Greig (M-L); 145; 0.28%	Carolyn Parrish
Mississauga—Erindale	Carolyn Parrish; 28,246; 54.37%	Bob Dechert; 16,600; 31.95%	Simon Black; 5,104; 9.82%	Jeff Brownridge; 1,855; 3.57%	David Greig (M-L); 145; 0.28%	merged district
Mississauga—Erindale	Carolyn Parrish; 28,246; 54.37%	Bob Dechert; 16,600; 31.95%	Simon Black; 5,104; 9.82%	Jeff Brownridge; 1,855; 3.57%	David Greig (M-L); 145; 0.28%	Steve Mahoney§
Mississauga South	Paul John Mark Szabo; 24,628; 51.67%	Phil Green; 16,027; 33.62%	Michael James Culkin; 5,004; 10.50%	Neeraj Jain; 1,899; 3.98%	Dagmar Sullivan (M-L); 107; 0.22%	Paul Szabo
Mississauga—Streetsville	Wajid Khan; 22,768; 50.56%	Nina Tangri; 14,287; 31.73%	Manjinder Rai; 4,266; 9.47%	Otto Casanova; 2,415; 5.36%	Peter Gibson Creighton (PC); 1,293; 2.87%	new district
Oakville	M.A. Bonnie Brown; 28,729; 52.01%	Rick Byers; 19,524; 35.35%	Alison Myrden; 4,027; 7.29%	Tania Orton; 2,861; 5.18%	Zeshan Shahbaz (CAP); 95; 0.17%	Bonnie Brown

==== Hamilton, Burlington and Niagara ====
Profile & Notes	Electoral History
This region has been traditionally Conservative, however the Liberal Party swept the region, along with most of the rest in Ontario, in the last three elections. However, most Liberal victories outside Hamilton proper can be attributed to vote-splitting between the two right-wing parties. Now that they have merged, the Conservatives are targeting several ridings in the area in this election. In Hamilton, the New Democrats is looking for major gains as well. They held the seat of Hamilton Mountain twice. Traditionally, Liberal support has been concentrated in Niagara Falls, Welland and in Hamilton. The Liberal membership in at least one Hamilton riding is heavily divided, with disgruntled former MP Sheila Copps rumoured to be running for the NDP or as an independent before she announced she was quitting politics. Notes: 1 - Bryden defected from Liberals in Feb. '04	••••••••••	2004
	•••••••••••	2000
	•••••••••••	1997
	•••••••••••	1993
	•••••••••••	1988
	•••••••••••	1984
	•••••••••••	1980
	•••••••••••	1979

Electoral district	Candidates						Incumbent
Electoral district	Liberal	Conservative	NDP	Green	Christian Heritage	Other	Incumbent
Ancaster—Dundas—Flamborough—Westdale	Russ Powers; 21,935; 39.69%	David Sweet; 19,135; 34.63%	Gordon Guyatt; 11,557; 20.91%	David Januczkowski; 2,636; 4.77%			John Bryden§^{1}
Burlington	Paddy Torsney; 27,423; 44.96%	Mike Wallace; 23,389; 38.35%	David Carter Laird; 6,581; 10.79%	Angela Reid; 3,169; 5.20%	John Herman Wubs; 429; 0.70%		Paddy Torsney
Halton	Gary Carr; 27,362; 48.35%	Dean Martin; 21,704; 38.35%	Anwar Naqvi; 4,642; 8.20%	Frank Marchetti; 2,889; 5.10%			Julian Reed†
Hamilton Centre	**Stan Keyes**; 14,948; 33.70%	Leon Patrick O'Connor; 6,714; 15.13%	David Christopherson; 20,321; 45.81%	Anne Marie Pavlov; 1,422; 3.21%	Stephen Downey; 520; 1.17%	Michael James Baldasaro (NA); 345 0.78%	**Stan Keyes**
Hamilton Centre	**Stan Keyes**; 14,948; 33.70%	Leon Patrick O'Connor; 6,714; 15.13%	David Christopherson; 20,321; 45.81%	Anne Marie Pavlov; 1,422; 3.21%	Stephen Downey; 520; 1.17%	Jamilé Ghaddar (M-L); 91 0.21%	**Stan Keyes**
Hamilton East—Stoney Creek	**Tony Valeri**; 18,417; 37.74%	Fred Eisenberger; 10,888; 22.31%	Tony DePaulo; 17,490; 35.84%	Richard Safka; 1,446; 2.96%		Sam Cino (Ind.); 393 0.81% ———— Bob Mann (Comm.); 166 0.34%	**Tony Valeri**
Hamilton East—Stoney Creek	**Tony Valeri**; 18,417; 37.74%	Fred Eisenberger; 10,888; 22.31%	Tony DePaulo; 17,490; 35.84%	Richard Safka; 1,446; 2.96%		Sam Cino (Ind.); 393 0.81% ———— Bob Mann (Comm.); 166 0.34%	merged district
Hamilton East—Stoney Creek	**Tony Valeri**; 18,417; 37.74%	Fred Eisenberger; 10,888; 22.31%	Tony DePaulo; 17,490; 35.84%	Richard Safka; 1,446; 2.96%		Sam Cino (Ind.); 393 0.81% ———— Bob Mann (Comm.); 166 0.34%	Sheila Copps§
Hamilton Mountain	Beth Phinney; 18,548; 34.81%	Tom Jackson; 15,590; 29.26%	Chris Charlton; 17,552; 32.94%	Jo Pavlov; 1,378; 2.59%		Paul Lane (M-L); 214; 0.40%	Beth Phinney
Niagara Falls	Victor Pietrangelo; 18,745; 36.48%	Rob Nicholson; 19,882; 38.70%	Wayne Gates; 10,680; 20.79%	Ted Mousseau; 2,071; 4.03%			Gary Pillitteri†
Niagara West—Glanbrook	Debbie Zimmerman; 20,210; 39.01%	Dean Allison; 20,874; 40.29%	Dave Heatley; 7,681; 14.82%	Tom Ferguson; 1,761; 3.40%	David Bylsma; 1,107; 2.14%	Phil Rose (CAP); 179; 0.35%	new district
St. Catharines	Walt Lastewka; 21,277; 40.44%	Leo Bonomi; 18,261; 34.71%	Ted Mouradian; 10,135; 19.26%	Jim Fannon; 1,927; 3.66%	Linda Klassen; 751; 1.43%	Elaine Couto (M-L); 61 0.12%	Walt Lastewka
St. Catharines	Walt Lastewka; 21,277; 40.44%	Leo Bonomi; 18,261; 34.71%	Ted Mouradian; 10,135; 19.26%	Jim Fannon; 1,927; 3.66%	Linda Klassen; 751; 1.43%	Jane Elizabeth Paxton (CAP); 204 0.39%	Walt Lastewka
Welland	John Maloney; 19,642; 39.63%	Mel Grunstein; 12,997; 26.22%	Jody Di Bartolomeo; 14,623; 29.50%	Ryan McLaughlin; 1,454; 2.93%	Irma D. Ruiter; 735; 1.48%	Ron Walker (M-L); 113; 0.23%	John Maloney
Welland	John Maloney; 19,642; 39.63%	Mel Grunstein; 12,997; 26.22%	Jody Di Bartolomeo; 14,623; 29.50%	Ryan McLaughlin; 1,454; 2.93%	Irma D. Ruiter; 735; 1.48%	Ron Walker (M-L); 113; 0.23%	merged district
Welland	John Maloney; 19,642; 39.63%	Mel Grunstein; 12,997; 26.22%	Jody Di Bartolomeo; 14,623; 29.50%	Ryan McLaughlin; 1,454; 2.93%	Irma D. Ruiter; 735; 1.48%	Ron Walker (M-L); 113; 0.23%	Tony Tirabassi§

==== Midwestern Ontario ====
Profile & Notes	Electoral History
This area is traditionally conservative, except for the riding of Brant which has not voted Conservative since 1958. Brant is where the NDP did will with popular MP Derek Blackburn from 1971 to 1993. However, the NDP have been unable to duplicate this success in this area, and are unlikely to do so. The Conservatives won every other seat except for three seats in 1979, 1980, 1984, and 1988 sweeping the area (except for Brant) in 1984 and 1979. The three seats that went Liberal were Guelph and Kitchener (1980) and Haldimand-Norfolk (1988). Since the collapse of the Conservatives, and vote splitting the Liberals swept this area in 1993, 1997 and 2000. However, with a united right, this is unlikely to be duplicated a fourth time.	•••••••••••	2004
	••••••••••	2000
	••••••••••	1997
	•••••••••	1993
	•••••••••	1988
	•••••••••	1984
	•••••••••	1980
	•••••••••	1979

Electoral district	Candidates						Incumbent
Electoral district	Liberal	Conservative	NDP	Green	Christian Heritage	Other	Incumbent
Brant	Lloyd St. Amand; 20,455; 38.05%	Greg Martin; 17,792; 33.10%	Lynn Bowering; 11,826; 22.00%	Helen-Anne Embry; 2,738; 5.09%	Barra L. Gots; 570; 1.06%	John C. Turmel (Ind.); 373; 0.69%	Jane Stewart†
Cambridge	Janko Peric; 18,899; 36.65%	Gary Goodyear; 19,123; 37.09%	Gary Price; 10,392; 20.15%	Gareth M. White; 2,506; 4.86%	John G. Gots; 395; 0.77%	Alex W. Gryc (Ind.); 114 0.22%	Janko Peric
Cambridge	Janko Peric; 18,899; 36.65%	Gary Goodyear; 19,123; 37.09%	Gary Price; 10,392; 20.15%	Gareth M. White; 2,506; 4.86%	John G. Gots; 395; 0.77%	John Oprea (Ind.); 134 0.26%	Janko Peric
Guelph	Brenda Chamberlain; 23,442; 44.61%	Jon Dearden; 13,721; 26.11%	Phil Allt; 10,527; 20.03%	Mike Nagy; 3,866; 7.36%	Peter Ellis; 634; 1.21%	Manuel Couto (M-L); 66 0.13%	Brenda Chamberlain
Guelph	Brenda Chamberlain; 23,442; 44.61%	Jon Dearden; 13,721; 26.11%	Phil Allt; 10,527; 20.03%	Mike Nagy; 3,866; 7.36%	Peter Ellis; 634; 1.21%	Lyne Rivard (Mar.); 291 0.55%	Brenda Chamberlain
Haldimand—Norfolk	**Bob Speller**; 19,336; 38.84%	Diane Finley; 20,981; 42.15%	Carrie Sinkowski; 7,143; 14.35%	Colin Jones; 1,703; 3.42%	Steven Elgersma; 617; 1.24%		**Bob Speller**
Huron—Bruce	Paul Steckle; 25,538; 49.79%	Barb Fisher; 15,930; 31.06%	Grant Robertson; 6,707; 13.08%	Dave Vasey; 1,518; 2.96%	Dave Joslin; 958; 1.87%	Glen Smith (Mar.); 638; 1.24%	Paul Steckle
Kitchener Centre	Karen Redman; 21,264; 47.13%	Thomas Ichim; 12,412; 27.51%	Richard Walsh-Bowers; 8,717; 19.32%	Karol Vesely; 2,450; 5.43%		Mark Corbiere (Ind.); 277; 0.61%	Karen Redman
Kitchener—Conestoga	Lynn Myers; 17,819; 42.29%	Frank Luellau; 14,903; 35.37%	Len Carter; 6,623; 15.72%	Kris Stapleton; 2,793; 6.63%			Lynn Myers
Kitchener—Waterloo	Andrew Telegdi; 28,015; 48.12%	Steve Strauss; 17,155; 29.47%	Edwin Laryea; 9,267; 15.92%	Pauline Richards; 3,277; 5.63%	Frank Ellis; 379; 0.65%	Ciprian Mihalcea (Ind.); 124; 0.21%	Andrew Telegdi
Oxford	Murray Coulter; 14,011; 30.52%	Dave Mackenzie; 20,606; 44.89%	Zoé Dorcas Kunschner; 6,673; 14.54%	Irene Tietz; 1,951; 4.25%	Leslie Bartley; 1,534; 3.34%	James Bender (Mar.); 794 1.73%	John Finlay†
Oxford	Murray Coulter; 14,011; 30.52%	Dave Mackenzie; 20,606; 44.89%	Zoé Dorcas Kunschner; 6,673; 14.54%	Irene Tietz; 1,951; 4.25%	Leslie Bartley; 1,534; 3.34%	Alex Kreider (CAP); 108 0.24%	John Finlay†
Oxford	Murray Coulter; 14,011; 30.52%	Dave Mackenzie; 20,606; 44.89%	Zoé Dorcas Kunschner; 6,673; 14.54%	Irene Tietz; 1,951; 4.25%	Leslie Bartley; 1,534; 3.34%	Kaye Sargent (Libert.); 226 0.49%	John Finlay†
Perth Wellington	Brian Innes; 15,032; 33.42%	Gary Ralph Schellenberger; 18,879; 41.97%	Robert Roth; 7,027; 15.62%	John Cowling; 2,770; 6.16%	Irma Nicolette Devries; 1,273; 2.83%		Gary Schellenberger
Wellington—Halton Hills	Bruce Hood; 19,173; 38.21%	Mike Chong; 21,479; 42.81%	Noel Duignan; 5,974; 11.91%	Brent Bouteiller; 2,725; 5.43%	Pat Woode; 826; 1.65%		new district

==== Southwestern Ontario ====
Profile & Notes	Electoral History
Southwestern Ontario is traditionally a very Liberal region of Ontario, but is divided between urban and rural. The Liberals do well in the cities of Windsor and London, and Conservatives do well in the rural areas of Kent County, Essex County, Lambton County, Elgin County, and Middlesex County. The NDP also has done well in the past, and currently in Windsor and London, where unions are strong. The NDP was elected in both Windsor-Walkerville and London-Fanshawe in 1984 and 1988, and hold both Windsor seats currently. The Liberas swept all but the riding of Elgin in 1980, the Conservatives swept all but the two Windsor ridings in 1984, and one London riding. The Liberals swept every single riding here in 1993 and 1997, and all but the riding of Windsor-St. Clair in 2000.	••••••••••	2004
	••••••••••	2000
	••••••••••	1997
	•••••••••••	1993
	•••••••••••	1988
	•••••••••••	1984
	•••••••••••	1980
	•••••••••••	1979

Electoral district	Candidates						Incumbent
Electoral district	Liberal	Conservative	NDP	Green	Marxist-Leninist	Other	Incumbent
Chatham-Kent—Essex	Jerry Pickard; 17,435; 39.63%	Dave Van Kesteren; 17,028; 38.70%	Kathleen Kevany; 7,538; 17.13%	Rod Hetherington; 1,845; 4.19%	Margaret Mondaca; 150; 0.34%		Jerry Pickard
Elgin—Middlesex—London	**Gar Knutson**; 15,860; 34.20%	Joe Preston; 20,333; 43.84%	Tim McCallum; 6,763; 14.58%	Julie-Ann Stodolny; 2,033; 4.38%		Will Arlow (CAP); 146 0.31%	**Gar Knutson**
Elgin—Middlesex—London	**Gar Knutson**; 15,860; 34.20%	Joe Preston; 20,333; 43.84%	Tim McCallum; 6,763; 14.58%	Julie-Ann Stodolny; 2,033; 4.38%		Ken DeVries (CHP); 1,246 2.69%	**Gar Knutson**
Essex	Susan Whelan; 17,926; 34.95%	Jeff Watson; 18,755; 36.57%	David Tremblay; 12,519; 24.41%	Paul Forman; 1,981; 3.86%	Robert A. Cruise; 105; 0.20%		Susan Whelan
London—Fanshawe	Pat O'Brien; 15,664; 38.08%	John Mazzilli; 10,811; 26.28%	Irene Mathyssen; 12,511; 30.41%	Ed Moore; 1,634; 3.97%	Cameron Switzer; 65; 0.16%	Derrall Bellaire (PC); 453; 1.10%	Pat O'Brien
London North Centre	Joe Fontana; 21,472; 43.08%	Tim Gatten; 13,677; 27.44%	Joe Swan; 12,034; 24.14%	Bronagh Joyce Morgan; 2,376; 4.77%	Gustavo Granados-Ocon; 67; 0.13%	Rod Morley (PC); 220; 0.44%	Joe Fontana
London West	Sue Barnes; 25,061; 45.48%	Mike Menear; 17,335; 31.46%	Gina Barber; 9,522; 17.28%	Rebecca Bromwich; 2,611; 4.74%	Margaret Villamizar; 67; 0.12%	Steve Hunter (PC); 511; 0.93%	Sue Barnes
Middlesex—Kent—Lambton	Rose-Marie Ur; 19,452; 39.73%	Bev Shipley; 19,288; 39.39%	Kevin Blake; 7,376; 15.06%	Allan McKeown; 1,834; 3.75%		Allan James (CHP); 1,015; 2.07%	Rose-Marie Ur
Sarnia—Lambton	Roger Gallaway; 19,932; 41.93%	Marcel Beaubien; 14,500; 30.50%	Greg Agar; 7,764; 16.33%	Anthony Cramer; 2,548; 5.36%		Dave Core (Ind.); 749 1.58%	Roger Gallaway
Sarnia—Lambton	Roger Gallaway; 19,932; 41.93%	Marcel Beaubien; 14,500; 30.50%	Greg Agar; 7,764; 16.33%	Anthony Cramer; 2,548; 5.36%		Gary De Boer (CHP); 1,819 3.83%	Roger Gallaway
Sarnia—Lambton	Roger Gallaway; 19,932; 41.93%	Marcel Beaubien; 14,500; 30.50%	Greg Agar; 7,764; 16.33%	Anthony Cramer; 2,548; 5.36%		John Elliott (Ind.); 229 0.48%	Roger Gallaway
Windsor—Tecumseh	Rick Limoges; 16,219; 33.88%	Rick Fuschi; 9,827; 20.53%	Joe Comartin; 20,037; 41.85%	Élizabeth Powles; 1,613; 3.37%	Laura Chesnik; 182; 0.38%		Joe Comartin
Windsor West	Richard Pollock; 13,831; 31.32%	Jordan Katz; 8,348; 18.91%	Brian Masse; 20,297; 45.97%	Rob Spring; 1,545; 3.50%	Enver Villamizar; 134; 0.30%		Brian Masse

==== Northern Ontario ====
Profile & Notes	Electoral History
Northern Ontario is traditionally a very Liberal area in Ontario, but with historically strong showings by the NDP. The Conservatives have only won a combined total of 9 seats in Northern Ontario since 1979, 4 of which in the very Conservative Parry Sound Muskoka. The NDP has consistently done well here, finishing either first or second, even if it means not winning seats. They are especially strong in Thunder Bay-Atikokan, Nickel Belt, and Sault Ste. Marie, but have also won seats in Kenora-Rainy River, Thunder Bay-Nipigon, and Timmins Chapleau. The only bad showing by the Liberals since 1979 came in 1984, where they still managed 3 of 12 seats winning in Algoma, Sudbury, and Cochrane despite a national Conservative landslide.	•••••••••	2004
	••••••••••	2000
	••••••••••	1997
	••••••••••••	1993
	••••••••••••	1988
	••••••••••••	1984
	••••••••••••	1980
	••••••••••••	1979

Electoral district	Candidates					Incumbent
Electoral district	Liberal	Conservative	NDP	Green	Other	Incumbent
Algoma—Manitoulin—Kapuskasing	Brent St. Denis; 14,276; 40.94%	Blaine Armstrong; 8,093; 23.21%	Carol Hughes; 11,051; 31.69%	Lindsay Killen; 1,449; 4.16%		Brent St. Denis
Kenora	Roger Valley; 8,563; 36.23%	Bill Brown; 6,598; 27.92%	Susan Barclay; 7,577; 32.06%	Carl Chaboyer; 898; 3.80%		Bob Nault†
Nickel Belt	Raymond Bonin; 17,188; 42.41%	Mike Dupont; 7,628; 18.82%	Claude Gravelle; 13,980; 34.50%	Steve Lafleur; 1,031; 2.54%	Michel D. Ethier (Mar.); 430 1.06%	Raymond Bonin
Nickel Belt	Raymond Bonin; 17,188; 42.41%	Mike Dupont; 7,628; 18.82%	Claude Gravelle; 13,980; 34.50%	Steve Lafleur; 1,031; 2.54%	Don Lavallee (Ind.); 217 0.54%	Raymond Bonin
Nickel Belt	Raymond Bonin; 17,188; 42.41%	Mike Dupont; 7,628; 18.82%	Claude Gravelle; 13,980; 34.50%	Steve Lafleur; 1,031; 2.54%	Steve Rutchinski (M-L); 51 0.13%	Raymond Bonin
Nipissing—Timiskaming	Anthony Rota; 18,254; 42.31%	Al McDonald; 16,001; 37.09%	Dave Fluri; 7,354; 17.05%	Les Wilcox; 1,329; 3.08%	Ross MacLean (CAP); 204; 0.47%	Bob Wood†
Parry Sound-Muskoka	**Andy Mitchell**; 19,271; 43.86%	Keith Montgomery; 15,970; 36.35%	Jo-Anne Marie Boulding; 5,171; 11.77%	Glen Hodgson; 3,524; 8.02%		**Andy Mitchell**
Sault Ste. Marie	Carmen Provenzano; 15,760; 36.55%	Cameron Ross; 9,969; 23.12%	Tony Martin; 16,512; 38.29%	Julie Emmerson; 814; 1.89%	Mike Taffarel (M-L); 67; 0.16%	Carmen Provenzano
Sudbury	Diane Marleau; 18,914; 44.19%	Stephen L. Butcher; 9,008; 21.05%	Gerry McIntaggart; 12,781; 29.86%	Luke Norton; 1,999; 4.67%	Dave Starbuck (M-L); 100; 0.23%	Diane Marleau
Thunder Bay—Rainy River	Ken Boshcoff; 14,290; 39.37%	David Leskowski; 9,559; 26.33%	John Rafferty; 10,781; 29.70%	Russ Aegard; 856; 2.36%	Johannes Scheibler (CHP); 267 0.74%	Stan Dromisky†
Thunder Bay—Rainy River	Ken Boshcoff; 14,290; 39.37%	David Leskowski; 9,559; 26.33%	John Rafferty; 10,781; 29.70%	Russ Aegard; 856; 2.36%	Doug Thompson (Mar.); 547 1.51%	Stan Dromisky†
Thunder Bay—Superior North	**Joe Comuzzi**; 15,022; 43.04%	Bev Sarafin; 7,394; 21.18%	Bruce Hyer; 10,230; 29.31%	Carl Rose; 1,614; 4.62%	Denis A. Carrière (Mar.); 645; 1.85%	**Joe Comuzzi**
Timmins-James Bay	Raymond Chénier; 13,525; 39.65%	Andrew Van Oosten; 5,682; 16.66%	Charlie Angus; 14,138; 41.45%	Marsha Gail Kriss; 767; 2.25%		Réginald Bélair†
Timmins-James Bay	Raymond Chénier; 13,525; 39.65%	Andrew Van Oosten; 5,682; 16.66%	Charlie Angus; 14,138; 41.45%	Marsha Gail Kriss; 767; 2.25%		merged district
Timmins-James Bay	Raymond Chénier; 13,525; 39.65%	Andrew Van Oosten; 5,682; 16.66%	Charlie Angus; 14,138; 41.45%	Marsha Gail Kriss; 767; 2.25%		Ben Serré†

=== Manitoba ===

Manitoba is traditionally split between the NDP, the Liberals, and the Conservatives. This is especially true in the city of Winnipeg where most Manitobans live. However, due to vote splitting in recent elections, neither the Progressive Conservatives or the Canadian Alliance/Reform Party have been able to win in Winnipeg. In rural Manitoba, the Liberals are usually shut out of elections (exception in 1993). Conservative support is normally in the more populous south, with NDP support in the sparsely populated north, which usually only means one seat.

==== Rural Manitoba ====
Profile & Notes	Electoral History
Rural Manitoba is traditionally very Conservative, sith some NDP leanings. Vote splitting only effected this area in 1993, when the Liberals nearly swept the region, winning all but one seat. In 1997 they could keep one. The Progressive Conservatives did their best here, out of all of western Canada, winning the riding of Brandon-Souris in both 1997 and 2000. The NDP's strength lies in the riding of Churchill, in northern Manitoba where they have consistently won in.	••••••	2004
Rural Manitoba is traditionally very Conservative, sith some NDP leanings. Vote splitting only effected this area in 1993, when the Liberals nearly swept the region, winning all but one seat. In 1997 they could keep one. The Progressive Conservatives did their best here, out of all of western Canada, winning the riding of Brandon-Souris in both 1997 and 2000. The NDP's strength lies in the riding of Churchill, in northern Manitoba where they have consistently won in.	••••••	2000
Rural Manitoba is traditionally very Conservative, sith some NDP leanings. Vote splitting only effected this area in 1993, when the Liberals nearly swept the region, winning all but one seat. In 1997 they could keep one. The Progressive Conservatives did their best here, out of all of western Canada, winning the riding of Brandon-Souris in both 1997 and 2000. The NDP's strength lies in the riding of Churchill, in northern Manitoba where they have consistently won in.	••••••	1997
Rural Manitoba is traditionally very Conservative, sith some NDP leanings. Vote splitting only effected this area in 1993, when the Liberals nearly swept the region, winning all but one seat. In 1997 they could keep one. The Progressive Conservatives did their best here, out of all of western Canada, winning the riding of Brandon-Souris in both 1997 and 2000. The NDP's strength lies in the riding of Churchill, in northern Manitoba where they have consistently won in.	•••••••	1993
Rural Manitoba is traditionally very Conservative, sith some NDP leanings. Vote splitting only effected this area in 1993, when the Liberals nearly swept the region, winning all but one seat. In 1997 they could keep one. The Progressive Conservatives did their best here, out of all of western Canada, winning the riding of Brandon-Souris in both 1997 and 2000. The NDP's strength lies in the riding of Churchill, in northern Manitoba where they have consistently won in.	•••••••	1988
Rural Manitoba is traditionally very Conservative, sith some NDP leanings. Vote splitting only effected this area in 1993, when the Liberals nearly swept the region, winning all but one seat. In 1997 they could keep one. The Progressive Conservatives did their best here, out of all of western Canada, winning the riding of Brandon-Souris in both 1997 and 2000. The NDP's strength lies in the riding of Churchill, in northern Manitoba where they have consistently won in.	•••••••	1984
Rural Manitoba is traditionally very Conservative, sith some NDP leanings. Vote splitting only effected this area in 1993, when the Liberals nearly swept the region, winning all but one seat. In 1997 they could keep one. The Progressive Conservatives did their best here, out of all of western Canada, winning the riding of Brandon-Souris in both 1997 and 2000. The NDP's strength lies in the riding of Churchill, in northern Manitoba where they have consistently won in.	•••••••	1980
Rural Manitoba is traditionally very Conservative, sith some NDP leanings. Vote splitting only effected this area in 1993, when the Liberals nearly swept the region, winning all but one seat. In 1997 they could keep one. The Progressive Conservatives did their best here, out of all of western Canada, winning the riding of Brandon-Souris in both 1997 and 2000. The NDP's strength lies in the riding of Churchill, in northern Manitoba where they have consistently won in.	•••••••	1979

Electoral district	Candidates						Incumbent
Electoral district	Liberal	Conservative	NDP	Green	Christian Heritage	Communist	Incumbent
Brandon—Souris	Murray Downing; 8,522; 24.21%	Merv Tweed; 18,209; 51.72%	Mike Abbey; 6,740; 19.15%	David Kattenburg; 1,264; 3.59%	Colin Atkins; 351; 1.00%	Lisa Gallagher; 118; 0.34%	Rick Borotsik†
Churchill	Ron Evans; 7,604; 38.35%	Bill Archer; 2,999; 15.13%	Bev Desjarlais; 8,612; 43.44%	C. David Nickarz; 612; 3.09%			Bev Desjarlais
Dauphin—Swan River	Don Dewar; 6,809; 20.38%	Inky Mark; 18,025; 53.95%	Walter Kolisnyk; 7,341; 21.97%	Lindy Clubb; 673; 2.01%	David C. Andres; 560; 1.68%		Inky Mark
Portage—Lisgar	Don Kuhl; 6,174; 17.74%	Brian Pallister; 22,939; 65.93%	Daren Van Den Bussche; 3,251; 9.34%	Marc Payette; 856; 2.46%	David Reimer; 1,458; 4.19%	Allister Cucksey; 117; 0.34%	Brian Pallister
Provencher	Peter Epp; 8,975; 24.92%	Vic Toews; 22,694; 63.02%	Sarah Zaharia; 3,244; 9.01%	Janine G. Gibson; 1,100; 3.05%			Vic Toews
Selkirk—Interlake	Bruce Benson; 9,059; 22.85%	James Bezan; 18,727; 47.25%	Duane Nicol; 10,516; 26.53%	Trevor Farley; 982; 2.48%	Anthony Barendregt; 353; 0.89%		Howard Hilstrom†

==== Winnipeg ====
Profile & Notes	Electoral History
Winnipeg has traditionally been a three-way race between the NDP, the Conservatives and the Liberals. That ended in 1993, and since then nor the Progressive Conservatives or the Alliance/Reform Party have been able to win a seat here. Now that they are merged, their prospects look good to return Winnipeg once again into a three-way race. Notes: 1 - formerly held by John Harvard	••••••••	2004
Winnipeg has traditionally been a three-way race between the NDP, the Conservatives and the Liberals. That ended in 1993, and since then nor the Progressive Conservatives or the Alliance/Reform Party have been able to win a seat here. Now that they are merged, their prospects look good to return Winnipeg once again into a three-way race. Notes: 1 - formerly held by John Harvard	••••••••	2000
Winnipeg has traditionally been a three-way race between the NDP, the Conservatives and the Liberals. That ended in 1993, and since then nor the Progressive Conservatives or the Alliance/Reform Party have been able to win a seat here. Now that they are merged, their prospects look good to return Winnipeg once again into a three-way race. Notes: 1 - formerly held by John Harvard	••••••••	1997
Winnipeg has traditionally been a three-way race between the NDP, the Conservatives and the Liberals. That ended in 1993, and since then nor the Progressive Conservatives or the Alliance/Reform Party have been able to win a seat here. Now that they are merged, their prospects look good to return Winnipeg once again into a three-way race. Notes: 1 - formerly held by John Harvard	•••••••	1993
Winnipeg has traditionally been a three-way race between the NDP, the Conservatives and the Liberals. That ended in 1993, and since then nor the Progressive Conservatives or the Alliance/Reform Party have been able to win a seat here. Now that they are merged, their prospects look good to return Winnipeg once again into a three-way race. Notes: 1 - formerly held by John Harvard	•••••••	1988
Winnipeg has traditionally been a three-way race between the NDP, the Conservatives and the Liberals. That ended in 1993, and since then nor the Progressive Conservatives or the Alliance/Reform Party have been able to win a seat here. Now that they are merged, their prospects look good to return Winnipeg once again into a three-way race. Notes: 1 - formerly held by John Harvard	•••••••	1984
Winnipeg has traditionally been a three-way race between the NDP, the Conservatives and the Liberals. That ended in 1993, and since then nor the Progressive Conservatives or the Alliance/Reform Party have been able to win a seat here. Now that they are merged, their prospects look good to return Winnipeg once again into a three-way race. Notes: 1 - formerly held by John Harvard	•••••••	1980
Winnipeg has traditionally been a three-way race between the NDP, the Conservatives and the Liberals. That ended in 1993, and since then nor the Progressive Conservatives or the Alliance/Reform Party have been able to win a seat here. Now that they are merged, their prospects look good to return Winnipeg once again into a three-way race. Notes: 1 - formerly held by John Harvard	•••••••	1979

Electoral district	Candidates							Incumbent
Electoral district	Liberal	Conservative	NDP	Green	Communist	Marijuana	Other	Incumbent
Charleswood—St. James	Glen Murray; 17,954; 42.55%	Steven John Fletcher; 18,688; 44.29%	Peter Carney; 4,283; 10.15%	Andrew Basham; 880; 2.09%	Beatriz Alas; 49; 0.12%	Dan Zupansky; 337; 0.80%		vacant^{1}
Elmwood—Transcona	Tanya Parks; 4,923; 16.81%	Bryan McLeod; 7,644; 26.11%	Bill Blaikie; 15,221; 51.99%	Elijah Gair; 719; 2.46%	Paul Sidon; 74; 0.25%	Gavin Whittaker; 311; 1.06%	Robert Scott (CHP); 386; 1.32%	Bill Blaikie
Kildonan—St. Paul	Terry Duguid; 13,304; 36.54%	Joy Smith; 13,582; 37.30%	Lorene Mahoney; 8,202; 22.53%	Jacob Giesbrecht; 756; 2.08%		Rebecca Whittaker; 290; 0.80%	Katharine Reimer (CHP); 278; 0.76%	new district
Saint Boniface	Raymond Simard; 17,989; 46.61%	Ken Cooper; 11,956; 30.98%	Mathieu Allard; 6,954; 18.02%	Daniel Backé; 925; 2.40%	Gérard Guay; 77; 0.20%	Chris Buors; 317; 0.82%	Jeannine Moquin-Perry (CHP); 378; 0.98%	Raymond Simard
Winnipeg Centre	David Northcott; 9,285; 34.69%	Robert Eng; 3,631; 13.56%	Pat Martin; 12,149; 45.39%	Robin (Pilar) Faye; 1,151; 4.30%	Anna-Celestrya Carr; 114; 0.43%	John M. Siedleski; 346; 1.29%	Douglas Edward Schweitzer (Ind.); 92; 0.34%	Pat Martin
Winnipeg North	**Rey D. Pagtakhan**; 9,491; 36.55%	Kris Stevenson; 3,186; 12.27%	Judy Wasylycia-Leis; 12,507; 48.16%	Alon Weinberg; 531; 2.04%	Darrell Rankin; 111; 0.43%		Eric Truijen (CHP); 141; 0.54%	**Rey Pagtakhan**
Winnipeg North	**Rey D. Pagtakhan**; 9,491; 36.55%	Kris Stevenson; 3,186; 12.27%	Judy Wasylycia-Leis; 12,507; 48.16%	Alon Weinberg; 531; 2.04%	Darrell Rankin; 111; 0.43%		Eric Truijen (CHP); 141; 0.54%	merged district
Winnipeg North	**Rey D. Pagtakhan**; 9,491; 36.55%	Kris Stevenson; 3,186; 12.27%	Judy Wasylycia-Leis; 12,507; 48.16%	Alon Weinberg; 531; 2.04%	Darrell Rankin; 111; 0.43%		Eric Truijen (CHP); 141; 0.54%	Judy Wasylycia-Leis
Winnipeg South	**Reg Alcock**; 19,270; 51.31%	Rod Bruinooge; 12,770; 34.00%	Catherine Green; 4,217; 11.23%	Ron Cameron; 1,003; 2.67%			Jane MacDiarmid (CHP); 296; 0.79%	**Reg Alcock**
Winnipeg South Centre	Anita Neville; 18,133; 46.60%	Raj Joshi; 10,516; 27.02%	James Allum; 8,270; 21.25%	Ian Scott; 1,508; 3.88%	Andrew Dalgliesh; 81; 0.21%	Andy Caisse; 293; 0.75%	Magnus Thompson (CAP); 114; 0.29%	Anita Neville

=== Saskatchewan ===

In terms of party lines, Saskatchewan is not divided up between north and south but by urban and rural. Traditionally, Saskatchewan has been a two-way race between the Conservatives, and later the Reform/Alliance and the NDP. Recent vote splitting has allowed the Liberals to come through and win a few seats in this polarized province. Urban Saskatchewan has tended to vote NDP and rural Saskatchewan has tended to vote Conservative. This is especially true in provincial politics, where riding boundaries more reflect the urban/rural divide. Both Saskatoon and Regina, Saskatchewans largest cities are split into 4 ridings each. All eight of these ridings are generally split evenly between rural and urban. Northern Saskatchewan has in the past been the stand-alone region of rural Saskatchewan, usually voting for the NDP.

==== Southern Saskatchewan ====
Profile & Notes	Electoral History
Southern Saskatchewan is traditionally split between the NDP and the Conservatives. In 1993, the Reform Party came along, and stole most Conservative votes, but also made room for the Liberals to win seats here, and make the area a 3-way race. Notes: 1 - Spencer formerly CA; 2 - Devine's Conservative nomination blocked	•••••••	2004
Southern Saskatchewan is traditionally split between the NDP and the Conservatives. In 1993, the Reform Party came along, and stole most Conservative votes, but also made room for the Liberals to win seats here, and make the area a 3-way race. Notes: 1 - Spencer formerly CA; 2 - Devine's Conservative nomination blocked	•••••••	2000
Southern Saskatchewan is traditionally split between the NDP and the Conservatives. In 1993, the Reform Party came along, and stole most Conservative votes, but also made room for the Liberals to win seats here, and make the area a 3-way race. Notes: 1 - Spencer formerly CA; 2 - Devine's Conservative nomination blocked	•••••••	1997
Southern Saskatchewan is traditionally split between the NDP and the Conservatives. In 1993, the Reform Party came along, and stole most Conservative votes, but also made room for the Liberals to win seats here, and make the area a 3-way race. Notes: 1 - Spencer formerly CA; 2 - Devine's Conservative nomination blocked	•••••••	1993
Southern Saskatchewan is traditionally split between the NDP and the Conservatives. In 1993, the Reform Party came along, and stole most Conservative votes, but also made room for the Liberals to win seats here, and make the area a 3-way race. Notes: 1 - Spencer formerly CA; 2 - Devine's Conservative nomination blocked	•••••••	1988
Southern Saskatchewan is traditionally split between the NDP and the Conservatives. In 1993, the Reform Party came along, and stole most Conservative votes, but also made room for the Liberals to win seats here, and make the area a 3-way race. Notes: 1 - Spencer formerly CA; 2 - Devine's Conservative nomination blocked	•••••••	1984
Southern Saskatchewan is traditionally split between the NDP and the Conservatives. In 1993, the Reform Party came along, and stole most Conservative votes, but also made room for the Liberals to win seats here, and make the area a 3-way race. Notes: 1 - Spencer formerly CA; 2 - Devine's Conservative nomination blocked	•••••••	1980
Southern Saskatchewan is traditionally split between the NDP and the Conservatives. In 1993, the Reform Party came along, and stole most Conservative votes, but also made room for the Liberals to win seats here, and make the area a 3-way race. Notes: 1 - Spencer formerly CA; 2 - Devine's Conservative nomination blocked	•••••••	1979

Electoral district	Candidates						Incumbent
Electoral district	Liberal	Conservative	NDP	Green	Christian Heritage	Independent	Incumbent
Cypress Hills—Grasslands	Bill Caton; 5,547; 18.68%	David Anderson; 18,010; 60.64%	Jeff Potts; 4,901; 16.50%	Bev Currie; 1,243; 4.19%			David L. Anderson
Palliser	John Williams; 8,244; 24.82%	Dave Batters; 11,909; 35.85%	Dick Proctor; 11,785; 35.48%	Brian Rands; 829; 2.50%	Harold Stephan; 451; 1.36%		Dick Proctor
Regina—Lumsden—Lake Centre	Gary Anderson; 10,167; 32.82%	Tom Lukiwski; 10,289; 33.21%	Moe Kovatch; 8,300; 26.79%	Fiorindo Agi; 716; 2.31%		Larry Spencer; 1,506; 4.86%	Larry Spencer^{1}
Regina—Qu'Appelle	Allyce Herle; 7,793; 27.84%	Andrew Scheer; 10,012; 35.76%	Lorne Edmund Nystrom; 9,151; 32.69%	Deanna Robilliard; 639; 2.28%	Mary Sylvia Nelson; 293; 1.05%	Lorne Edward Widger (NA); 106; 0.38%	Lorne Nystrom
Souris—Moose Mountain	Lonny McKague; 6,001; 19.59%	Ed Komarnicki; 11,306; 36.90%	Robert Stephen Stringer; 4,202; 13.72%	Sigfredo Gonzalez; 537; 1.75%	Robert Thomas Jacobson; 191; 0.62%	Grant Devine^{2} 8,399; 27.42%	Roy Bailey†
Wascana	**Ralph Goodale**; 20,567; 57.17%	Doug Cryer; 8,709; 24.21%	Erin M. K. Weir; 5,771; 16.04%	Darcy Robilliard; 928; 2.58%			**Ralph Goodale**
Yorkton—Melville	Ted Quewezance; 4,697; 14.83%	Gary Breitkreuz; 19,940; 62.94%	Don Olson; 5,890; 18.59%	Ralph Pilchner; 630; 1.99%		David Sawkiw; 524; 1.65%	Gary Breitkreuz

==== Northern Saskatchewan ====
Profile & Notes	Electoral History
Northern Saskatchewan has also been a traditional two-way race between the NDP and the Conservatives. The NDP with their strongest support in the riding of Churchill River. However, the most recent 2000 election saw this riding pass to the Liberals. More recent elections have seen the Reform/Canadian Alliance do extremely well here, and are expected to do just as well, or even better as the new Conservative Party. Notes: 1 - Laliberte did not seek Liberal nomination 2 - Pankiw formerly CA; 3 - Chris Axworthy was a former New Democrats MP and provincial cabinet minister	•••••••	2004
	•••••••	2000
	•••••••	1997
	•••••••	1993
	•••••••	1988
	•••••••	1984
	•••••••	1980
	•••••••	1979

Electoral district	Candidates					Incumbent
Electoral district	Liberal	Conservative	NDP	Green	Other	Incumbent
Battlefords—Lloydminster	Del Price; 4,617; 17.42%	Gerry Ritz; 15,441; 58.25%	Shawn McKee; 5,367; 20.25%	Kelsey Pearson; 766; 2.89%	Diane Stephan (CHP); 316; 1.19%	Gerry Ritz
Blackstrap	Tiffany Paulsen; 11,815; 31.40%	Lynne Yelich; 15,608; 41.48%	Don Kossick; 8,862; 23.55%	Lynn Oliphant; 1,168; 3.10%	Clayton A. Sundberg (CHP); 177; 0.47%	Lynne Yelich
Churchill River	Al Ducharme; 5,815; 29.87%	Jeremy Harrison; 7,279; 37.39%	Earl Cook; 3,910; 20.09%	Marcella Gall; 539; 2.77%	Rick Laliberte (Ind.); 1,923; 9.88%	Rick Laliberte^{1}
Prince Albert	Patrick W. Jahn; 6,929; 24.13%	Brian Fitzpatrick; 13,576; 47.28%	Don Hovdebo; 7,221; 25.15%	Marc Loiselle; 987; 3.44%		Brian Fitzpatrick
Saskatoon—Humboldt	Patrick Wolfe; 9,009; 25.52%	Bradley R. Trost; 9,444; 26.75%	Nettie Wiebe; 9,027; 25.57%	Ron Schriml; 680; 1.93%	Jim Pankiw (Ind.); 7,076 20.04%	Jim Pankiw^{2}
Saskatoon—Humboldt	Patrick Wolfe; 9,009; 25.52%	Bradley R. Trost; 9,444; 26.75%	Nettie Wiebe; 9,027; 25.57%	Ron Schriml; 680; 1.93%	Larry Zarysky (NA); 71 0.20%	Jim Pankiw^{2}
Saskatoon—Rosetown—Biggar	Myron Luczka; 4,171; 15.75%	Carol Skelton; 11,875; 44.84%	Dennis Gruending; 9,597; 36.24%	Rick Barsky; 841; 3.18%		Carol Skelton
Saskatoon—Wanuskewin	Chris Axworthy^{3} 10,553; 32.58%	Maurice Vellacott; 15,109; 46.64%	Priscilla Settee; 5,770; 17.81%	David Greenfield; 960; 2.96%		Maurice Vellacott

=== Alberta ===

Alberta is unarguably the most Conservative province in Canada. You need only look at the results of the ridings here in the last century to prove this. Alberta has long been a Progressive Conservative province, but with the collapse of the party in 1993, Albertans went to the Reform Party of Canada (later the Canadian Alliance) for their vote. Edmonton seems to be the only exception to this. The Liberals have won in Edmonton six times since 1993, and the NDP has won in Edmonton as well.

==== Rural Alberta ====
Profile & Notes	Electoral History
This region is unarguably the most Conservative region in Canada. One may only have to look at the election results from the last 70 years to prove it. The Progressive Conservative Party of Canada did not lose a single seat in rural Alberta from 1972 until the party's collapse of 1993. Instead a new right wing party, the Reform Party of Canada took over and swept rural Alberta in the next two elections. They did the same under the Canadian Alliance banner in 2000. It is unlikely any other party will win here in 2004.	••••••••••••	2004
	•••••••••••	2000
	•••••••••••	1997
	••••••••••••	1993
	••••••••••••	1988
	••••••••••	1984
	••••••••••	1980
	••••••••••	1979

Electoral district	Candidates					Incumbent
Electoral district	Liberal	Conservative	NDP	Green	Other	Incumbent
Athabasca	Doug Faulkner; 7,158; 24.05%	Brian Jean; 17,942; 60.30%	Robert Cree; 3,115; 10.47%	Ian Hopfe; 1,542; 5.18%		new district
Crowfoot	Adam Campbell; 3,615; 7.70%	Kevin Sorenson; 37,649; 80.21%	Ellen Parker; 3,241; 6.90%	Arnold Baker; 1,795; 3.82%	Max Leonard Cornelssen (Mar.); 639; 1.36%	Kevin Sorenson
Lethbridge	Ken Nicol; 10,250; 21.56%	Rick Casson; 29,765; 62.62%	Melanee Thomas; 4,623; 9.73%	Erin Marie Matthews; 1,262; 2.66%	Dustin Sobie (Mar.); 553 1.16%	Rick Casson
Lethbridge	Ken Nicol; 10,250; 21.56%	Rick Casson; 29,765; 62.62%	Melanee Thomas; 4,623; 9.73%	Erin Marie Matthews; 1,262; 2.66%	Ken Vanden Broek (CHP); 1,079 2.27%	Rick Casson
Macleod	Chris Shade; 5,214; 12.09%	Ted Menzies; 32,232; 74.76%	Joyce Thomas; 2,802; 6.50%	Laurel Denise Fadeeff; 2,865; 6.65%		Grant Hill†
Medicine Hat	Bill Cocks; 4,331; 10.91%	Monte Kenton Solberg; 30,241; 76.15%	Betty Stroh; 3,643; 9.17%	Kevin Dodd; 1,498; 3.77%		Monte Solberg
Peace River	Lyle Carlstrom; 8,200; 18.97%	Charlie Penson; 28,158; 65.13%	Susan Thompson; 4,804; 11.11%	Benjamin Morrison Pettit; 2,073; 4.79%		Charlie Penson
Red Deer	Luke Kurata; 5,294; 11.82%	Bob Mills; 33,510; 74.80%	Jeff Sloychuk; 3,500; 7.81%	Garfield John Marks; 2,142; 4.78%	Teena Cormack (CAP); 353; 0.79%	Bob Mills
Vegreville—Wainwright	Duff Stewart; 5,390; 11.73%	Leon E. Benoit; 33,800; 73.54%	Len Legault; 3,793; 8.25%	James Kenney; 2,976; 6.48%		Leon Benoit
Westlock—St. Paul	Joe Dion; 7,619; 19.26%	Dave Chatters; 26,433; 66.80%	Peggy Kirkeby; 3,480; 8.79%	John A. McDonald; 2,036; 5.15%		David Chatters
Wetaskiwin	Rick Bonnett; 5,088; 11.93%	Dale Johnston; 31,404; 73.66%	Tim Robson; 3,090; 7.25%	Tom Lampman; 2,642; 6.20%	Brent McKelvie (CAP); 410; 0.96%	Dale Johnston
Wild Rose	Judy Stewart; 5,971; 12.64%	Myron Thompson; 33,337; 70.60%	Jeff Horvath; 4,009; 8.49%	Chris Foote; 3,904; 8.27%		Myron Thompson
Yellowhead	Peter Crossley; 4,441; 11.50%	Rob Merrifield; 26,503; 68.61%	Noel Lapierre; 4,429; 11.47%	Eric Stieglitz; 2,534; 6.56%	Jacob Strydhorst (CHP); 721; 1.87%	Rob Merrifield

==== Edmonton and environs ====
Electoral History
••••••••	2004
••••••••	2000
••••••••	1997
••••••••	1993
••••••••	1988
••••••	1984
••••••	1980
••••••	1979

Edmonton is the most left wing area of Alberta, but this doesn't say much. Much like the rest of Alberta, Edmonton usually always votes for the leading right wing party of the day. This is the one area of Alberta where the Liberals have been able to win anything in recent years, winning two seats in both 1997 and 2000, and four seats in 1993. The NDP have also won a seat in Edmonton, doing so in 1988. The two Liberal incumbents are both in close races, and the new Conservative Party of Canada could possibly sweep Edmonton, and therefore all of Alberta.

Electoral district	Candidates					Incumbent
Electoral district	Liberal	Conservative	NDP	Green	Other	Incumbent
Edmonton—Beaumont	David Kilgour; 17,555; 42.82%	Tim Uppal; 17,421; 42.49%	Paul Reikie; 3,975; 9.70%	Michael Garfinkle; 1,911; 4.66%	Naomi Rankin (Comm.); 135; 0.33%	David Kilgour; Edmonton Southeast
Edmonton Centre	**Anne McLellan**; 22,560; 42.50%	Laurie Hawn; 21,839; 41.14%	Meghan McMaster; 4,836; 9.11%	David J. Parker; 2,584; 4.87%	John Baloun (Ind.); 221 0.42%	**Anne McLellan**; Edmonton West
Edmonton Centre	**Anne McLellan**; 22,560; 42.50%	Laurie Hawn; 21,839; 41.14%	Meghan McMaster; 4,836; 9.11%	David J. Parker; 2,584; 4.87%	Lyle Kenny (Mar.); 509 0.96%	**Anne McLellan**; Edmonton West
Edmonton Centre	**Anne McLellan**; 22,560; 42.50%	Laurie Hawn; 21,839; 41.14%	Meghan McMaster; 4,836; 9.11%	David J. Parker; 2,584; 4.87%	Peggy Morton (M-L); 78 0.15%	**Anne McLellan**; Edmonton West
Edmonton Centre	**Anne McLellan**; 22,560; 42.50%	Laurie Hawn; 21,839; 41.14%	Meghan McMaster; 4,836; 9.11%	David J. Parker; 2,584; 4.87%	Sean Tisdall (PC); 456 0.86%	**Anne McLellan**; Edmonton West
Edmonton East	John Bethel^{@} 14,250; 32.43%	Peter Goldring; 20,224; 46.02%	Janina Strudwick; 6,464; 14.71%	Harlan Light; 2,471; 5.62%	Ed Spronk (CHP); 538; 1.22%	Peter Goldring; Edmonton Centre-East
Edmonton—Leduc	Bruce King; 14,269; 29.32%	James Rajotte; 26,791; 55.05%	Doug McLachlan; 4,581; 9.41%	Bruce Sinclair; 3,029; 6.22%		James Rajotte; Edmonton Southwest
Edmonton—St. Albert	Moe Saeed; 12,359; 24.15%	John Williams; 29,508; 57.65%	Mike Melymick; 5,927; 11.58%	Conrad A. Bitangcol; 3,387; 6.62%		John Williams; St. Albert
Edmonton—St. Albert	Moe Saeed; 12,359; 24.15%	John Williams; 29,508; 57.65%	Mike Melymick; 5,927; 11.58%	Conrad A. Bitangcol; 3,387; 6.62%		merged district
Edmonton—St. Albert	Moe Saeed; 12,359; 24.15%	John Williams; 29,508; 57.65%	Mike Melymick; 5,927; 11.58%	Conrad A. Bitangcol; 3,387; 6.62%		Deborah Grey†; Edmonton North
Edmonton—Sherwood Park	Maureen Towns; 11,519; 24.49%	Ken Epp; 27,222; 57.87%	Chris Harwood; 5,155; 10.96%	Margaret Marean; 3,146; 6.69%		Ken Epp; Elk Island
Edmonton—Spruce Grove	Neil Mather; 12,912; 25.57%	Rona Ambrose; 30,497; 60.40%	Hayley Phillips; 4,508; 8.93%	Jerry Paschen; 2,572; 5.09%		new district
Edmonton—Strathcona	Debby Carlson; 14,057; 29.01%	Rahim Jaffer; 19,089; 39.40%	Malcolm Azania; 11,535; 23.81%	Cameron Wakefield; 3,146; 6.49%	Dave Dowling (Mar.); 519 1.07%	Rahim Jaffer
Edmonton—Strathcona	Debby Carlson; 14,057; 29.01%	Rahim Jaffer; 19,089; 39.40%	Malcolm Azania; 11,535; 23.81%	Cameron Wakefield; 3,146; 6.49%	Kevan Hunter (M-L); 103 0.21%	Rahim Jaffer

==== Calgary ====
Electoral History
••••••••	2004
•••••••	2000
•••••••	1997
••••••	1993
••••••	1988
•••••	1984
•••••	1980
•••••	1979

Calgary, the largest city in Alberta is just as Conservative as rural Alberta. The Progressive Conservatives swept Calgary until 1993, then it was the Reform Party in 1993 and 1997, then the Canadian Alliance in 2000. The one abnormal seat was when Progressive Conservative Party leader Joe Clark won the riding of Calgary Centre in 2000. It is expected the Conservatives will once again sweep Calgary in 2004.

Electoral district	Candidates					Incumbent
Electoral district	Liberal	Conservative	NDP	Green	Other	Incumbent
Calgary Centre	Julia Turnbull; 15,305	Lee Richardson; 26,192	Keith Purdy; 4,350	Phillip K. Liesemer; 5,080	274	Joe Clark (Note: Elected as a Progressive Conservative in 2000, declined to join the Conservative caucus upon the merger of the Progressive Conservative party and the Canadian Alliance.)
Calgary East	James Maxim; 7,621	Deepak Obhrai; 21,897	Elizabeth Thomas; 3,535	Dean Kenneth Christie; 2,529	245	Deepak Obhrai
Calgary North Centre	Cathy Mcclusky; 11,093	Jim Prentice; 28,143	John Chan; 6,298	Mark Macgillivray; 5,840	564	New district
Calgary Northeast	Dale Muti; 8,672	Art Hanger; 21,924	Giorgio Cattabeni; 2,682	Morgan Duford; 1,658	291	Art Hanger
Calgary—Nose Hill	Ted Haney; 11,051	Diane Ablonczy; 31,088	Vinay Dey; 3,250	Richard Larson; 2,898		Diane Ablonczy
Calgary Southeast	Jim Tanner; 8,488	Jason Kenney; 36,843	Brian Pincott; 3,419	George Read; 3,142		Jason Kenney
Calgary Southwest	Avalon Roberts; 9,501	**Stephen Harper**; 35,297	Daria Fox; 2,884	Darcy Kraus; 3,210	745	**Stephen Harper**
Calgary West	Justin Thompson; 16,402	Rob Anders; 31,322	Tim Patterson; 3,632	Danielle Roberts; 4,274	402	Rob Anders

=== British Columbia ===

British Columbia is what many pundits consider to be the complete opposite of a bellwether region. British Columbia has a history of voting against the government. This has meant the NDP in the 1980s and the Reform/Canadian Alliance in the 1990s. More recently, regional trends have started to appear in B.C. The interior votes very Conservative, as the Canadian Alliance swept this area in 2000. B.C. has in the past been a province that would swing from one extreme to the other going for the right wing Social Credit to the left wing NDP in the past, in not only federal elections but provincial elections. The NDP also does well in British Columbia, or at least has in the past. Recently, they have been reduced to seats in the Vancouver area. There is hope that they will return to more traditional NDP seats on Vancouver Island, and in the interior. The Liberals have also won a few seats in B.C. recently, an area they have traditionally done very poor. Their strengths are in Victoria and in Vancouver.

==== Interior B.C. ====
Electoral district	Candidates						Incumbent
Electoral district	Liberal	Conservative	NDP	Green	Canadian Action	Other	Incumbent
Cariboo—Prince George	Gurbux Saini; 8,397; 19.89%	Dick Harris; 19,721; 46.72%	Rick Smith; 11,183; 26.49%	Douglas Gook; 1,798; 4.26%	Bev Collins; 408; 0.97%	Carol Lee Chapman (M-L); 79 0.19%	Dick Harris
Cariboo—Prince George	Gurbux Saini; 8,397; 19.89%	Dick Harris; 19,721; 46.72%	Rick Smith; 11,183; 26.49%	Douglas Gook; 1,798; 4.26%	Bev Collins; 408; 0.97%	Mike Orr (Ind.); 478 1.13%	merged district
Cariboo—Prince George	Gurbux Saini; 8,397; 19.89%	Dick Harris; 19,721; 46.72%	Rick Smith; 11,183; 26.49%	Douglas Gook; 1,798; 4.26%	Bev Collins; 408; 0.97%	Jeff Paetkau (Libert.); 148 0.35%	Philip Mayfield†
Kamloops—Thompson	John O'Fee; 14,434; 28.26%	Betty Hinton; 20,611; 40.35%	Brian Carroll; 13,379; 26.19%	Grant Fraser; 2,213; 4.33%		Arjun Singh (Ind.); 440; 0.86%	Betty Hinton
Kelowna	Vern Nielsen; 14,109; 26.50%	Werner Schmidt; 25,553; 48.00%	Starleigh Grass; 8,954; 16.82%	Kevin Ade; 3,903; 7.33%	Michael Cassidyne-Hook; 271; 0.51%	Huguette Plourde (Mar.); 447; 0.84%	Werner Schmidt
Kootenay—Columbia	Ross Priest; 7,351; 17.92%	Jim Abbott; 21,336; 52.02%	Brent Bush; 9,772; 23.82%	Carmen Gustafson; 2,558; 6.24%			Jim Abbott
North Okanagan—Shuswap	Will Hansma; 11,636; 22.48%	Darrel Stinson; 24,014; 46.39%	Alice Brown; 12,528; 24.20%	Erin Nelson; 2,333; 4.51%	Claire A. Foss; 257; 0.50%	Gordon Campbell (NA); 401 0.77%	Darrel Stinson
North Okanagan—Shuswap	Will Hansma; 11,636; 22.48%	Darrel Stinson; 24,014; 46.39%	Alice Brown; 12,528; 24.20%	Erin Nelson; 2,333; 4.51%	Claire A. Foss; 257; 0.50%	K. No. Daniels (NA); 104 0.20%	Darrel Stinson
North Okanagan—Shuswap	Will Hansma; 11,636; 22.48%	Darrel Stinson; 24,014; 46.39%	Alice Brown; 12,528; 24.20%	Erin Nelson; 2,333; 4.51%	Claire A. Foss; 257; 0.50%	Blair T. Longley (Mar.); 492 0.95%	Darrel Stinson
Okanagan—Coquihalla	Vanessa Sutton; 11,212; 23.05%	Stockwell Day; 24,220; 49.79%	Joyce Procure; 9,509; 19.55%	Harry Naegal; 2,896; 5.95%	Lelannd Haver; 259; 0.53%	Jack William Peach (Mar.); 548; 1.13%	Stockwell Day
Prince George—Peace River	Arleene Thorpe; 4,988; 13.76%	Jay Hill; 21,281; 58.71%	Michael Hunter; 7,501; 20.70%	Hilary Crowley; 2,073; 5.72%	Harley J. Harasym; 301; 0.83%	Tara Rimstad (M-L); 101; 0.28%	Jay Hill
Skeena—Bulkley Valley	Miles Richardson; 7,965; 21.59%	Andy Burton; 12,434; 33.70%	Nathan Cullen; 13,706; 37.14%	Roger Colin Benham; 1,225; 3.32%		Frank Martin (M-L); 161 0.44%	Andy Burton
Skeena—Bulkley Valley	Miles Richardson; 7,965; 21.59%	Andy Burton; 12,434; 33.70%	Nathan Cullen; 13,706; 37.14%	Roger Colin Benham; 1,225; 3.32%		Rod Taylor (CHP); 1,408 3.82%	Andy Burton
Southern Interior	Doug Stanley; 8,310; 17.96%	Jim Gouk; 16,940; 36.60%	Alex Atamanenko; 16,260; 35.13%	Scott Leyland; 3,663; 7.91%	Farlie Paynter; 87; 0.19%	Karine Cyr (Mar.); 391 0.84%	Jim Gouk
Southern Interior	Doug Stanley; 8,310; 17.96%	Jim Gouk; 16,940; 36.60%	Alex Atamanenko; 16,260; 35.13%	Scott Leyland; 3,663; 7.91%	Farlie Paynter; 87; 0.19%	Robert Schuster (Ind.); 591 1.28%	Jim Gouk
Southern Interior	Doug Stanley; 8,310; 17.96%	Jim Gouk; 16,940; 36.60%	Alex Atamanenko; 16,260; 35.13%	Scott Leyland; 3,663; 7.91%	Farlie Paynter; 87; 0.19%	Brian Sproule (M-L); 39 0.08%	Jim Gouk

==== Fraser Valley and Southern Lower Mainland ====
Electoral district	Candidates					Incumbent
Electoral district	Liberal	Conservative	NDP	Green	Other	Incumbent
Abbotsford	Moe Gill; 9,617; 19.95%	Randy White; 29,587; 61.37%	Scott Fast; 6,575; 13.64%	Karl Hann; 1,389; 2.88%	Tim Felger (Mar.); 404 0.84%	Randy White
Abbotsford	Moe Gill; 9,617; 19.95%	Randy White; 29,587; 61.37%	Scott Fast; 6,575; 13.64%	Karl Hann; 1,389; 2.88%	Harold J. Ludwig (CHP); 585 1.21%	Randy White
Abbotsford	Moe Gill; 9,617; 19.95%	Randy White; 29,587; 61.37%	Scott Fast; 6,575; 13.64%	Karl Hann; 1,389; 2.88%	David MacKay (M-L); 51 0.11%	Randy White
Chilliwack—Fraser Canyon	Bob Besner; 8,249; 18.38%	Chuck Strahl; 24,096; 53.68%	Rollie L. Keith; 9,244; 20.59%	Aisha Coghlan; 1,449; 3.23%	**Ron Gray** (CHP); 1,156 2.58%	Chuck Strahl
Chilliwack—Fraser Canyon	Bob Besner; 8,249; 18.38%	Chuck Strahl; 24,096; 53.68%	Rollie L. Keith; 9,244; 20.59%	Aisha Coghlan; 1,449; 3.23%	Dorothy-Jean O'Donnell (M-L); 95 0.21%	Chuck Strahl
Chilliwack—Fraser Canyon	Bob Besner; 8,249; 18.38%	Chuck Strahl; 24,096; 53.68%	Rollie L. Keith; 9,244; 20.59%	Aisha Coghlan; 1,449; 3.23%	Norm Siefken (Mar.); 603 1.34%	Chuck Strahl
Delta—Richmond East	Shelley Leonhardt; 15,515; 33.20%	John Cummins; 21,308; 45.60%	Itrath Syed; 6,838; 14.63%	Dana L. Miller; 3,066; 6.56%		John Cummins
Dewdney—Alouette	Blanche Juneau; 10,500; 21.87%	Randy Kamp; 18,490; 38.51%	Mike Bocking; 15,693; 32.68%	Tammy Lea Meyer; 2,535; 5.28%	Scott Etches (NA); 798; 1.66%	Grant McNally†
Fleetwood—Port Kells	Gulzar Cheema; 11,568; 29.47%	Nina Grewal; 14,052; 35.80%	Barry Bell; 10,976; 27.97%	David Walters; 2,484; 6.33%	Joseph Theriault (M-L); 167; 0.43%	new district
Langley	Kim Richter; 12,649; 24.74%	Mark Warawa; 24,390; 47.70%	Dean Morrison; 8,568; 16.75%	Patrick Meyer; 3,108; 6.08%	Mel Kositsky (Ind.); 2,422; 4.74%	new district
Newton—North Delta	Sukh Dhaliwal; 13,009; 31.55%	Gurmant Grewal; 13,529; 32.82%	Nancy Clegg; 12,037; 29.20%	John Hague; 2,555; 6.20%	Nazir Rizvi (Comm.); 98; 0.24%	Gurmant Grewal
Richmond	Raymond Chan; 18,204; 44.48%	Alice Wong; 14,457; 35.33%	Dale Jackaman; 6,142; 15.01%	Stephen H.F. Kronstein; 1,743; 4.26%	Allan Warnke (CAP); 376; 0.92%	Joe Peschisolido§
South Surrey—White Rock—Cloverdale	Judy Higginbotham; 19,611; 36.77%	Russ Hiebert; 22,760; 42.67%	H. Pummy Kaur; 7,663; 14.37%	Romeo De La Pena; 3,032; 5.68%	Pat Taylor (CAP); 272; 0.51%	Val Meredith§
Surrey North	Dan Sheel; 5,413; 15.71%	Jasbir Singh Cheema; 4,340; 12.60%	Jim Karpoff; 8,312; 24.13%	Sunny Athwal; 658; 1.91%	Chuck Cadman (NA); 15,089; 43.80%	Chuck Cadman (Note: Cadman lost the Conservative nomination and left caucus to sit as an Independent in April 2004.)
Surrey North	Dan Sheel; 5,413; 15.71%	Jasbir Singh Cheema; 4,340; 12.60%	Jim Karpoff; 8,312; 24.13%	Sunny Athwal; 658; 1.91%	Gerhard Herwig (CHP); 460 1.34%	Chuck Cadman
Surrey North	Dan Sheel; 5,413; 15.71%	Jasbir Singh Cheema; 4,340; 12.60%	Jim Karpoff; 8,312; 24.13%	Sunny Athwal; 658; 1.91%	Joyce Holmes (Comm.); 93 0.27%	Chuck Cadman
Surrey North	Dan Sheel; 5,413; 15.71%	Jasbir Singh Cheema; 4,340; 12.60%	Jim Karpoff; 8,312; 24.13%	Sunny Athwal; 658; 1.91%	Roy Whyte (CAP); 85 0.25%	Chuck Cadman

==== Vancouver and Northern Lower Mainland ====
Electoral district	Candidates							Incumbent
Electoral district	Liberal	Conservative	NDP	Green	Canadian Action	Communist	Other	Incumbent
Burnaby—Douglas	Bill Cunningham^{@} 14,748; 32.53%	George Drazenovic; 12,531; 27.64%	Bill Siksay; 15,682; 34.59%	Shawn Hunsdale; 1,687; 3.72%		Hanne Gidora; 122; 0.27%	Frank Cerminara (Ind.); 282 0.62%	Svend Robinson†
Burnaby—Douglas	Bill Cunningham^{@} 14,748; 32.53%	George Drazenovic; 12,531; 27.64%	Bill Siksay; 15,682; 34.59%	Shawn Hunsdale; 1,687; 3.72%		Hanne Gidora; 122; 0.27%	Adam Desaulniers (Libert.); 291 0.64%	Svend Robinson†
Burnaby—New Westminster	Mary Pynenburg; 13,732; 32.93%	Mike Redmond; 11,821; 28.35%	Peter Julian; 14,061; 33.72%	Revel Kunz; 1,606; 3.85%	Dana Green; 312; 0.75%	Péter Pál Horváth; 166; 0.40%		new district
New Westminster—Coquitlam	Dave Haggard; 13,080; 27.40%	Paul Forseth; 15,693; 32.87%	Steve McClurg; 15,580; 32.64%	Carli Travers; 2,684; 5.62%			Jack Hummelman (CHP); 700; 1.47%	Paul Forseth
North Vancouver	Don H. Bell; 22,619; 40.03%	Ted White; 20,548; 36.36%	John Nelson; 8,967; 15.87%	Peggy Stortz; 4,114; 7.28%	Andres Esteban Barker; 181; 0.32%		Michael Hill (M-L); 77; 0.14%	Ted White
Port Moody—Westwood—Port Coquitlam	Kwangyul Peck; 12,445; 27.30%	James Moore; 18,664; 40.94%	Charley King; 12,023; 26.38%	Richard Voigt; 1,971; 4.32%	Pat Goff; 111; 0.24%	George Gidora; 94; 0.21%	Lewis Dahlby (Libert.); 276; 0.61%	James Moore
Vancouver Centre	Hedy Fry; 21,280; 40.31%	Gary Mitchell; 10,139; 19.21%	Kennedy Stewart; 17,050; 32.30%	Robbie Mattu; 3,580; 6.78%	Alexander Frei; 101; 0.19%	Kimball Carriou; 96; 0.18%	John Clarke (Libert.); 304 0.58%	Hedy Fry
Vancouver Centre	Hedy Fry; 21,280; 40.31%	Gary Mitchell; 10,139; 19.21%	Kennedy Stewart; 17,050; 32.30%	Robbie Mattu; 3,580; 6.78%	Alexander Frei; 101; 0.19%	Kimball Carriou; 96; 0.18%	Joe Pal (CHP); 243 0.46%	Hedy Fry
Vancouver East	Shirley Chan^{@} 10,768; 25.93%	Harvey Grigg; 4,153; 10.00%	Libby Davies; 23,452; 56.46%	Ron Plowright; 2,365; 5.69%			Marc Boyer (Mar.); 399 0.96%	Libby Davies
Vancouver East	Shirley Chan^{@} 10,768; 25.93%	Harvey Grigg; 4,153; 10.00%	Libby Davies; 23,452; 56.46%	Ron Plowright; 2,365; 5.69%			Gloria Anne Kieler (CHP); 250 0.60%	Libby Davies
Vancouver East	Shirley Chan^{@} 10,768; 25.93%	Harvey Grigg; 4,153; 10.00%	Libby Davies; 23,452; 56.46%	Ron Plowright; 2,365; 5.69%			Louis James Lesosky (NA); 147 0.35%	Libby Davies
Vancouver Kingsway	David Emerson^{@} 17,267; 40.44%	Jesse Johl; 7,037; 16.48%	Ian Waddell; 15,916; 37.28%	Tracey Jastinder Mann; 1,521; 3.56%	Jacob Rempel; 142; 0.33%	Jason Mann; 172; 0.40%	Jeannie Kwan (NA); 548 1.28%	Sophia Leung†
Vancouver Kingsway	David Emerson^{@} 17,267; 40.44%	Jesse Johl; 7,037; 16.48%	Ian Waddell; 15,916; 37.28%	Tracey Jastinder Mann; 1,521; 3.56%	Jacob Rempel; 142; 0.33%	Jason Mann; 172; 0.40%	Donna Petersen (M-L); 94 0.22%	Sophia Leung†
Vancouver Quadra	**Stephen Owen**; 29,187; 52.43%	Stephen Rogers; 14,648; 26.31%	David Askew; 8,348; 15.00%	Doug Warkentin; 3,118; 5.60%	**Connie Fogal**; 165; 0.30%		Katrina Chowne (Libert.); 151 0.27%	**Stephen Owen**
Vancouver Quadra	**Stephen Owen**; 29,187; 52.43%	Stephen Rogers; 14,648; 26.31%	David Askew; 8,348; 15.00%	Doug Warkentin; 3,118; 5.60%	**Connie Fogal**; 165; 0.30%		Donovan Young (M-L); 48 0.09%	**Stephen Owen**
Vancouver South	Ujjal Dosanjh^{@} 18,196; 44.52%	Victor Soo Chan; 10,426; 25.51%	Bev Meslo; 10,038; 24.56%	Doug Perry; 1,465; 3.58%	Joe Sixpack Horrocks; 90; 0.22%	Stephen Von Sychowski; 105; 0.26%	Charles Boylan (M-L); 119 0.29%	Herb Dhaliwal†
Vancouver South	Ujjal Dosanjh^{@} 18,196; 44.52%	Victor Soo Chan; 10,426; 25.51%	Bev Meslo; 10,038; 24.56%	Doug Perry; 1,465; 3.58%	Joe Sixpack Horrocks; 90; 0.22%	Stephen Von Sychowski; 105; 0.26%	H. Sandhu (NA); 98 0.24%	Herb Dhaliwal†
Vancouver South	Ujjal Dosanjh^{@} 18,196; 44.52%	Victor Soo Chan; 10,426; 25.51%	Bev Meslo; 10,038; 24.56%	Doug Perry; 1,465; 3.58%	Joe Sixpack Horrocks; 90; 0.22%	Stephen Von Sychowski; 105; 0.26%	Frank Wagner (CHP); 339 0.83%	Herb Dhaliwal†
West Vancouver—Sunshine Coast	Blair Wilson; 19,685; 32.51%	John Reynolds; 21,372; 35.30%	Nicholas Simons; 13,156; 21.73%	Andrea Goldsmith; 5,887; 9.72%	Marc Bombois; 321; 0.53%		Anne Jamieson (M-L); 123; 0.20%	John Reynolds

==== Vancouver Island ====
Electoral district	Candidates						Incumbent
Electoral district	Liberal	Conservative	NDP	Green	Canadian Action	Other	Incumbent
Esquimalt—Juan de Fuca	Keith Martin; 19,389; 35.30%	John Koury; 13,271; 24.16%	Randall Garrison; 16,821; 30.62%	Jane Sterk; 5,078; 9.24%	Shawn W. Giles; 141; 0.26%	Jen Fisher-Bradley (Ind.); 229; 0.42%	Keith Martin (Note: Elected as an Alliance MP in 2000, Keith Martin left the Alliance caucus in 2003, refusing to join the new Conservative Party and sat as an independent for the remainder of the 37th Parliament. He ran again successfully as a Liberal in 2004.)
Nanaimo—Alberni	Hira Chopra; 11,770; 19.86%	James D Lunney; 23,158; 39.07%	Scott Fraser; 19,152; 32.31%	David Wright; 4,357; 7.35%	Diana E. Lifton; 201; 0.34%	Barbara Biley (M-L); 80 0.13%	James Lunney
Nanaimo—Alberni	Hira Chopra; 11,770; 19.86%	James D Lunney; 23,158; 39.07%	Scott Fraser; 19,152; 32.31%	David Wright; 4,357; 7.35%	Diana E. Lifton; 201; 0.34%	Michael Mann (Mar.); 560 0.94%	James Lunney
Nanaimo—Cowichan	Lloyd Macilquham; 9,257; 16.03%	Dave Quist; 18,928; 32.78%	Jean Crowder; 25,243; 43.71%	Harold Henn; 3,822; 6.62%	Jeffrey Ian Warr; 270; 0.47%	Brunie Brunie (Ind.); 229; 0.40%	Reed Elley†
Saanich—Gulf Islands	David Mulroney; 17,082; 26.79%	Gary Lunn; 22,050; 34.58%	Jennifer Burgis; 13,763; 21.58%	Andrew Lewis; 10,662; 16.72%		Mary Moreau (Ind.); 214; 0.34%	Gary Lunn
Vancouver Island North	Noor Ahmed; 11,352; 21.46%	John Duncan; 18,733; 35.41%	Catherine Bell; 18,250; 34.50%	Pam Munroe; 4,456; 8.42%		Jack East (M-L); 111; 0.21%	John Duncan
Victoria	**David Anderson**; 20,398; 35.04%	Logan Wenham; 12,708; 21.83%	David Turner; 18,093; 31.08%	Ariel Lade; 6,807; 11.69%	Derek J. Skinner; 206; 0.35%		**David Anderson**

=== Nunavut ===
Electoral district	Candidates					Incumbent
Electoral district	Liberal	Conservative	NDP	Green	Independent	Incumbent
Nunavut	Nancy Karetak-Lindell; 3,818; 51.30%	Duncan Cunningham; 1,075; 14.45%	Bill Riddell; 1,129; 15.17%	Nedd Kenney; 248; 3.33%	Manitok Thompson; 1,172; 15.75%	Nancy Karetak-Lindell

=== Northwest Territories ===
Electoral district	Candidates				Incumbent
Electoral district	Liberal	Conservative	NDP	Green	Incumbent
Western Arctic	**Ethel Blondin-Andrew**; 5,317; 39.45%	Sean Mandeville; 2,314; 17.17%	Dennis Bevington; 5,264; 39.06%	Chris O'Brien; 583; 4.33%	**Ethel Blondin-Andrew**

=== Yukon ===
Electoral district	Candidates						Incumbent
Electoral district	Liberal	Conservative	NDP	Green	Christian Heritage	Marijuana	Incumbent
Yukon	Larry Bagnell; 5,724; 45.69%	James Hartle; 2,618; 20.90%	Pam Boyde; 3,216; 25.67%	Philippe LeBlond; 571; 4.56%	Geoffrey Capp; 100; 0.80%	Sean Davey; 299; 2.39%	Larry Bagnell

== See also ==
- List of Canadian federal electoral districts

== Sources ==
- Complete List of Official Candidates—Elections Canada
- Election Almanac - Canada Federal Election
- http://www.electionprediction.org/2004_fed/
