= Canadian federal election results in Quebec City =

Seats obtained by party (since 1945)

Liberal
Conservative
New Democratic
Bloc Québécois
Social Credit (defunct)
Progressive Conservative (defunct)
Independents

This article details Canadian federal election results in Quebec City.

== Local profile ==
Quebec City, like the rest of the province, used to be solidly Liberal until 1984. In 1984 and 1988, the Progressive Conservatives swept the area, thanks to nationalist support. This nationalist support went to the Bloc Québécois in 1993, and Quebec City became a Bloc stronghold for the next two decades.

In the 2000 election, the Liberals were able to gain some ground, winning two seats, but the Bloc regained those seats in the 2004 election before losing all but one in 2006 to the Conservatives. The 2006 and 2008 federal elections witnessed fierce battles between sovereigntist support for the Bloc, and populist/libertarian support for the Conservatives, which intensified greatly in the fallout of the CHOI-FM controversy.

In 2011, the unexpected surge of NDP support in Quebec managed to overwhelm the support of all other parties, allowing them to sweep Quebec City.

The Liberals remained on the radar screen in Quebec City, but this support didn't translate into actual seats again until 2015, when they won two seats. The Conservatives won the other three, among the few bright spots in the Tories' defeat that year. In 2019 the Bloc regained popularity, but only took one seat leaving two seats each for Liberals and Conservatives. All parties held their respective seats in 2021.

The 2025 election saw a surge in support for the Liberals at the expense of the Bloc, part of a wider trend across the province. They flipped the riding of Beauport—Limoilou from the Bloc. Meanwhile, the Conservative vote share declined in all five of the city's ridings (they did not field a candidate in Québec Centre due to a filing error), but the party managed to retain both of their seats.

=== Votes by party throughout time ===
Election	Liberal	Bloc Québécois	New Democratic	Conservative	Green	PC	Reform / Alliance	Social Credit	Others
1979	133,000; 66.1%	—N/a	15,156; 7.7%	—	No candidate	14,496; 7.2%	—	32,284; 16.0%	6,040; 3.0%
1980	129,060; 69.7%	—	20,918; 11.3%	—	No candidate	14,801; 8.0%	—	6,711; 3.6%	13,577; 7.3%
1984	73,565; 34.1%	—	23,635; 10.9%	—	No candidate	103,666; 48.0%	—	1,081; 0.5%	15,136; 7.0%
1988	59,771; 26.3%	—	34,194; 15.1%	—	2,837; 1.2%	126,926; 55.9%	—	—	3,471; 1.5%
1993	58,648; 25.0%	134,001; 57.1%	4,274; 1.8%	—	786; 0.3%	30,868; 13.2%	No candidate	—	5,975; 2.6%
1997	74,184; 32.2%	93,271; 40.5%	5,920; 2.6%	—	No candidate	51,655; 22.4%	3,642; 1.6%	—	1,533; 0.7%
2000	85,172; 38.1%	87,066; 38.9%	5,106; 2.3%	—	1,136; 0.5%	15,343; 6.9%	27,262; 12.2%	—	2,599; 1.2%
2004	65,783; 27.2%	112,567; 46.6%	10,670; 4.4%	41,503; 17.2%	8,191; 3.4%	Merged into Conservative Party		—	2,710; 1.1%
2006	27,068; 10.5%	90,566; 35.3%	19,829; 7.7%	103,696; 40.4%	9,624; 3.7%	Merged into Conservative Party		—	5,972; 2.3%
2008	43,262; 16.4%	85,905; 33.4%	29,312; 11.4%	91,428; 35.5%	6,925; 2.7%	Merged into Conservative Party		—	736; 0.3%
2011	23,124; 8.4%	56,454; 20.4%	116,832; 42.3%	73,936; 26.8%	4,779; 1.7%	Merged into Conservative Party		—	981; 0.4%
2015	77,313; 26.8%	40,385; 14.0%	62,283; 21.6%	101,232; 35.1%	6,817; 2.4%	Merged into Conservative Party		—	655; 0.2%
2019	82,362; 28.2%	80,973; 27.8%	25,596; 8.8%	83,978; 28.8%	11,739; 4.0%	Merged into Conservative Party		—	6,456; 2.2%
2021	75,997; 27.0%	73,523; 26.2%	22,880; 8.1%	96,456; 34.3%	5,569; 2.0%	Merged into Conservative Party		—	6,567; 2.3%
2025	127,257; 41.3%	75,198; 24.4%	11,338; 3.7%	87,645; 28.4%	897; 0.3%	Merged into Conservative Party		—	6,056; 2.0%

Votes by party in Québec City districts

Liberal New Democratic Conservative Bloc Québécois	Progressive Conservative (defunct) Social Credit (defunct) Reform (defunct) Alliance (defunct)

== Detailed results ==
=== 2021 ===
Electoral district	Candidates								Incumbent
Electoral district	Liberal	Conservative	BQ	NDP	Green	PPC	FPC	Other	Incumbent
Beauport—Limoilou	Ann Gingras; 12,378; 25.45%	Alupa Clarke; 14,164; 29.12%	Julie Vignola; 15,146; 31.14%	Camille Esther Garon; 5,075; 10.43%	Dalila Elhak; 1,025; 2.11%		Lyne Verret; 737; 1.52%	Claude Moreau (M-L); 119; 0.24%	Julie Vignola
Charlesbourg—Haute-Saint-Charles	René-Paul Coly; 11,326; 19.75%	Pierre Paul-Hus; 25,623; 44.68%	Marie-Christine Lamontagne; 14,237; 24.83%	Michel Marc Lacroix; 3,446; 6.01%	Jacques Palardy-Dion; 972; 1.69%	Wayne Cyr; 1,296; 2.26%	Daniel Pelletier; 449; 0.78%		Pierre Paul-Hus
Louis-Hébert	Joël Lightbound; 22,933; 38.35%	Gilles Lépine; 14,332; 23.97%	Marc Dean; 16,247; 27.17%	Hamid Nadji; 4,337; 7.25%	Denis Blanchette; 1,573; 2.63%			Ali Dahan (Ind.); 378; 0.63%	Joël Lightbound
Louis-Saint-Laurent	Nathanielle Morin; 11,228; 17.52%	Gérard Deltell; 33,098; 51.64%	Thierry Bilodeau; 13,069; 20.39%	Yu-Ti Eva Huang; 3,370; 5.26%	Daniel Chicoine; 907; 1.42%	Guillaume Côté; 1,337; 2.09%	Mélanie Fortin; 1,089; 1.70%		Gérard Deltell
Québec	Jean-Yves Duclos; 18,132; 35.42%	Bianca Boutin; 9,239; 18.05%	Louis Sansfaçon; 14,824; 28.96%	Tommy Bureau; 6,652; 12.99%	Patrick Kerr; 1,182; 2.31%	Daniel Brisson; 855; 1.67%	Karine Simard; 307; 0.60%		Jean-Yves Duclos
Source: Elections Canada

=== 2019 ===
Electoral district	Candidates							Incumbent
Electoral district	Liberal	Conservative	BQ	NDP	Green	PPC	Other	Incumbent
Beauport—Limoilou	Antoine Bujold; 13,020; 25.94%	Alupa Clarke; 13,185; 26.27%	Julie Vignola; 15,149; 30.18%	Simon-Pierre Beaudet; 5,599; 11.16%	Dalila Elhak; 2,127; 4.24%	Alicia Bédard; 1,033; 2.06%	Claude Moreau (M-L); 78; 0.16%	Alupa Clarke
Charlesbourg—Haute-Saint-Charles	René-Paul Coly; 12,584; 21.29%	Pierre Paul-Hus; 22,484; 38.05%	Alain D'Eer; 16,053; 27.16%	Guillaume Bourdeau; 4,554; 7.71%	Samuel Moisan-Domm; 2,042; 3.46%	Joey Pronovost; 1,379; 2.33%		Pierre Paul-Hus
Louis-Hébert	Joël Lightbound; 25,140; 40.51%	Marie-Josée Guérette; 10,912; 17.58%	Christian Hébert; 17,375; 28.00%	Jérémie Juneau; 4,884; 7.87%	Macarena Diab; 2,466; 3.97%	Daniel Brisson; 1,016; 1.64%	Ali Dahan (Ind.); 267; 0.43%	Joël Lightbound
Louis-Saint-Laurent	Jean-Christophe Cusson; 13,571; 20.70%	Gérard Deltell; 29,279; 44.66%	Jeanne-Paule Desgagnés; 14,674; 22.38%	Colette Amram Ducharme; 4,339; 6.62%	Sandra Mara Riedo; 2,155; 3.29%	Guillaume Côté; 1,543; 2.35%		Gérard Deltell
Québec	Jean-Yves Duclos; 18,047; 33.30%	Bianca Boutin; 8,118; 14.98%	Christiane Gagnon; 17,722; 32.70%	Tommy Bureau; 6,220; 11.48%	Luc Joli-Coeur; 2,949; 5.44%	Bruno Dabiré; 674; 1.24%	Sébastien CoRhino (Rhino.); 349; 0.64% Luc Paquin (PIQ); 119; 0.22%	Jean-Yves Duclos
Source: Elections Canada

=== 2015 ===
Electoral district	Candidates						Incumbent
Electoral district	Conservative	NDP	Liberal	BQ	Green	Other	Incumbent
Beauport—Limoilou	Alupa Clarke; 15,461; 30.58%	Raymond Côté; 12,881; 25.48%	Antoine Bujold; 12,854; 25.42%	Doni Berberi; 7,467; 14.77%	Dalila Elhak; 1,220; 2.41%	Francis Bedard (Libert.); 423 0.84%	Raymond Côté
Beauport—Limoilou	Alupa Clarke; 15,461; 30.58%	Raymond Côté; 12,881; 25.48%	Antoine Bujold; 12,854; 25.42%	Doni Berberi; 7,467; 14.77%	Dalila Elhak; 1,220; 2.41%	Bladimir Laborit (SD); 124 0.25%	Raymond Côté
Beauport—Limoilou	Alupa Clarke; 15,461; 30.58%	Raymond Côté; 12,881; 25.48%	Antoine Bujold; 12,854; 25.42%	Doni Berberi; 7,467; 14.77%	Dalila Elhak; 1,220; 2.41%	Claude Moreau (M-L); 128 0.25%	Raymond Côté
Charlesbourg—Haute-Saint-Charles	Pierre Paul-Hus; 24,608; 42.24%	Anne-Marie Day; 11,690; 20.07%	Jean Côté; 13,525; 23.22%	Marc Antoine Turmel; 7,177; 12.32%	Nathalie Baudet; 1,256; 2.16%		Anne-Marie Day
Louis-Hébert	Jean-Pierre Asselin; 16,789; 27.19%	Denis Blanchette; 12,850; 20.81%	Joël Lightbound; 21,516; 34.85%	Caroline Pageau; 8,900; 14.41%	Andrée-Anne Beaudoin-Julien; 1,561; 2.53%	Stefan Jetchick (CHP); 128; 0.21%	Denis Blanchette
Louis-Saint-Laurent	Gérard Deltell; 32,637; 50.46%	G. Daniel Caron; 10,296; 15.92%	Youri Rousseau; 13,852; 21.42%	Ronald Sirard; 6,688; 10.34%	Michel Savard; 1,210; 1.87%		Alexandrine Latendresse†
Québec	Pierre-Thomas Asselin; 11,737; 21.79%	Annick Papillon; 14,566; 27.04%	Jean-Yves Duclos; 15,566; 28.90%	Charles Mordret; 10,153; 18.85%	Philippe Riboty; 1,570; 2.91%	Normand Fournier (M-L); 153 0.28%	Annick Papillon
Québec	Pierre-Thomas Asselin; 11,737; 21.79%	Annick Papillon; 14,566; 27.04%	Jean-Yves Duclos; 15,566; 28.90%	Charles Mordret; 10,153; 18.85%	Philippe Riboty; 1,570; 2.91%	Danielle Provost (SD); 122 0.23%	Annick Papillon
Source: Elections Canada

=== 2011 ===
Electoral district	Candidates							Incumbent
Electoral district	BQ	Conservative	Liberal	NDP	Green	Christian Heritage	Marxist-Leninist	Incumbent
Beauport—Limoilou	Michel Létourneau; 10,250; 19.43%	Sylvie Boucher; 13,845; 26.24%	Lorraine Chartier; 3,162; 5.99%	Raymond Côté; 24,306; 46.07%	Louise Courville; 950; 1.80%	Anne-Marie Genest; 124; 0.24%	Claude Moreau; 122; 0.23%	Sylvie Boucher
Charlesbourg—Haute-Saint-Charles	Félix Grenier; 8,732; 16.29%	Daniel Petit; 16,220; 30.26%	Martine Gaudreault; 3,505; 6.54%	Anne-Marie Day; 24,131; 45.01%	Simon Verret; 832; 1.55%	Simon Cormier; 189; 0.35%		Daniel Petit
Louis-Hébert	Pascal-Pierre Paillé; 14,640; 24.21%	Pierre Paul-Hus; 13,207; 21.84%	Jean Beaupré; 8,110; 13.41%	Denis Blanchette; 23,373; 38.65%	Michelle Fontaine; 996; 1.65%	Marie-Claude Bouffard; 143; 0.24%		Pascal-Pierre Paillé
Louis-Saint-Laurent	France Gagné; 8,148; 14.36%	Josée Verner; 21,334; 37.59%	Philippe Mérel; 3,612; 6.36%	Alexandrine Latendresse; 22,629; 39.87%	Jean Cloutier; 857; 1.51%	Daniel Arseneault; 175; 0.31%		Josée Verner
Québec	Christiane Gagnon; 14,684; 27.96%	Pierre Morasse; 9,330; 17.77%	François Payeur; 4,735; 9.02%	Annick Papillon; 22,393; 42.64%	Yvan Dutil; 1,144; 2.18%	Stefan Jetchick; 228; 0.43%		Christiane Gagnon
Source: Elections Canada

=== 2008 ===
The Bloc Québécois won one of the four seats lost to the Conservatives in the last election.

Electoral district	Candidates						Incumbent
Electoral district	BQ	Conservative	Liberal	NDP	Green	Other	Incumbent
Beauport—Limoilou	Éléonore Mainguy; 15,962; 32.61%	Sylvie Boucher; 17,994; 36.76%	Yves Picard; 7,030; 14.36%	Simon-Pierre Beaudet; 5,986; 12.23%	Luc Côté; 1,363; 2.78%	Simon Bédard (Ind.); 610; 1.25%	Sylvie Boucher
Charlesbourg—Haute-Saint-Charles	Denis Courteau; 14,602; 29.22%	Daniel Petit; 20,566; 41.15%	Denise Legros; 7,039; 14.08%	Anne-Marie Day; 6,542; 13.09%	François Bédard; 1,231; 2.46%		Daniel Petit
Louis-Hébert	Pascal-Pierre Paillé; 20,992; 36.23%	Luc Harvey; 16,343; 28.21%	Jean Beaupré; 13,669; 23.59%	Denis Blanchette; 5,403; 9.33%	Michelle Fontaine; 1,408; 2.43%	Stefan Jetchick (CHP); 119; 0.21%	Luc Harvey
Louis-Saint-Laurent	France Gagné; 13,330; 26.53%	Josée Verner; 23,683; 47.14%	Hélène H. Leone; 6,712; 13.36%	Alexandrine Latendresse; 5,252; 10.45%	Jean Cloutier; 1,260; 2.51%		Josée Verner
Québec	Christiane Gagnon; 21,064; 41.76%	Myriam Taschereau; 12,943; 25.66%	Damien Rousseau; 8,845; 17.54%	Catheryn Roy-Goyette; 5,933; 11.76%	Yonnel Bonaventure; 1,650; 3.27%		Christiane Gagnon
Source: Elections Canada

=== 2006 ===
The Bloc Québécois held on to just one of the five seats in this region, losing four to the Conservatives, who had some of their strongest results in Quebec in this region in 2004, mainly from libertarian voters as a result of the CHOI-FM controversy.

Electoral district	Candidates						Incumbent
Electoral district	BQ	Liberal	Conservative	NDP	Green	Other	Incumbent
Beauport—Limoilou	Christian Simard; 18,589; 37.87%	Yves Picard; 4,929; 10.04%	Sylvie Boucher; 19,409; 39.54%	Simon-Pierre Beaudet; 3,917; 7.98%	Mario Laprise; 2,005; 4.08%	Jean Bédard (M–L); 234; 0.48%	Christian Simard; Beauport
Charlesbourg—Haute-Saint-Charles	Richard Marceau; 19,034; 38.28%	Valérie Giguère; 4,364; 8.78%	Daniel Petit; 20,406; 41.04%	Isabelle Martineau; 3,084; 6.20%	Les Parsons; 1,262; 2.54%	Daniel Pelletier (Ind.); 1,567; 3.15%	Richard Marceau; Charlesbourg
Louis-Hébert	Roger Clavet; 20,101; 34.08%	Hélène Chalifour Scherrer; 8,852; 15.01%	Luc Harvey; 20,332; 34.47%	Denis Blanchette; 5,351; 9.07%	Robert Hudon; 2,517; 4.27%	Francis Fortin (Ind.); 565 0.96%	Roger Clavet
Louis-Hébert	Roger Clavet; 20,101; 34.08%	Hélène Chalifour Scherrer; 8,852; 15.01%	Luc Harvey; 20,332; 34.47%	Denis Blanchette; 5,351; 9.07%	Robert Hudon; 2,517; 4.27%	Stefan Jetchick (CHP); 116 0.20%	Roger Clavet
Louis-Hébert	Roger Clavet; 20,101; 34.08%	Hélène Chalifour Scherrer; 8,852; 15.01%	Luc Harvey; 20,332; 34.47%	Denis Blanchette; 5,351; 9.07%	Robert Hudon; 2,517; 4.27%	Frédérick Têtu (Ind.); 1,147 1.94%	Roger Clavet
Louis-Saint-Laurent	Bernard Cleary; 11,997; 24.19%	Isa Gros-Louis; 3,180; 6.41%	Josée Verner; 28,606; 57.68%	Robert Donnelly; 2,848; 5.74%	Lucien Gravelle; 1,468; 2.96%	Christian Légaré (Ind.); 1,498; 3.02%	Bernard Cleary
Québec	Christiane Gagnon; 20,845; 41.53%	Caroline Drolet; 5,743; 11.44%	Frédérik Boisvert; 14,943; 29.77%	Michaël Lessard; 4,629; 9.22%	Yonnel Bonaventure; 2,372; 4.73%	Dan Aubut (Ind.); 813 1.62%	Christiane Gagnon
Québec	Christiane Gagnon; 20,845; 41.53%	Caroline Drolet; 5,743; 11.44%	Frédérik Boisvert; 14,943; 29.77%	Michaël Lessard; 4,629; 9.22%	Yonnel Bonaventure; 2,372; 4.73%	Francis Bedard (Libert.); 325 0.65%	Christiane Gagnon
Québec	Christiane Gagnon; 20,845; 41.53%	Caroline Drolet; 5,743; 11.44%	Frédérik Boisvert; 14,943; 29.77%	Michaël Lessard; 4,629; 9.22%	Yonnel Bonaventure; 2,372; 4.73%	Alexandre Raymond-Labrie (PC); 520 1.04%	Christiane Gagnon
Source: Elections Canada

=== 2004 ===
Electoral district	Candidates						Incumbent
Electoral district	Liberal	BQ	Conservative	NDP	Green	Other	Incumbent
Beauport	Dennis Dawson; 11,866; 25.63%	Christian Simard; 22,989; 49.65%	Stephan Asselin; 7,388; 15.96%	Xavier Trégan; 1,896; 4.09%	Jeannine T. Desharnais; 1,577; 3.41%	Nicolas Frichot (Mar.); 585; 1.26%	new district
Charlesbourg	Jean-Marie Laliberté; 11,911; 25.73%	Richard Marceau; 23,886; 51.60%	Bertrand Proulx; 7,306; 15.78%	François Villeneuve; 1,623; 3.51%	Marilou Moisan-Domm; 1,188; 2.57%	Benjamin Kasapoglu (Mar.); 376; 0.81%	Richard Marceau; Charlesbourg—Jacques-Cartier
Louis-Hébert	Hélène Chalifour Scherrer; 18,999; 34.03%	Roger Clavet; 24,071; 43.11%	Clermont Gauthier; 7,512; 13.45%	Robert Turcotte; 3,112; 5.57%	Jean-Pierre Guay; 2,137; 3.83%		Hélène Scherrer
Louis-Saint-Laurent	Michel Fragasso; 10,025; 22.34%	Bernard Cleary; 17,248; 38.44%	Josée Verner; 13,967; 31.13%	Christopher Bojanowski; 1,369; 3.05%	Yonnel Bonaventure; 1,243; 2.77%	Jean-Guy Carignan (Ind.); 563 1.25%	Jean-Guy Carignan (Note: Jean-Guy Carignan was elected as a Liberal MP for the Quebec East riding in 2000 but left the Liberal caucus in December 2001. He rejoined the Liberal caucus for 2 days in October 2003, and sat as an Independent MP for the remainder of the 37th Parliament.); Quebec East
Louis-Saint-Laurent	Michel Fragasso; 10,025; 22.34%	Bernard Cleary; 17,248; 38.44%	Josée Verner; 13,967; 31.13%	Christopher Bojanowski; 1,369; 3.05%	Yonnel Bonaventure; 1,243; 2.77%	Henri Gauvin (Ind.); 332 0.74%	Jean-Guy Carignan; Quebec East
Louis-Saint-Laurent	Michel Fragasso; 10,025; 22.34%	Bernard Cleary; 17,248; 38.44%	Josée Verner; 13,967; 31.13%	Christopher Bojanowski; 1,369; 3.05%	Yonnel Bonaventure; 1,243; 2.77%	Dominique Théberge (Comm.); 119 0.27%	Jean-Guy Carignan; Quebec East
Québec	Jean-Philippe Côté; 12,982; 26.97%	Christiane Gagnon; 24,373; 50.63%	Pierre Gaudreault; 5,330; 11.07%	Jean-Marie Fiset; 2,670; 5.55%	Antonine Yaccarini; 2,046; 4.25%	Jean Bédard (M-L); 223 0.46%	Christiane Gagnon
Québec	Jean-Philippe Côté; 12,982; 26.97%	Christiane Gagnon; 24,373; 50.63%	Pierre Gaudreault; 5,330; 11.07%	Jean-Marie Fiset; 2,670; 5.55%	Antonine Yaccarini; 2,046; 4.25%	Pierre-Etienne Paradis (Mar.); 512 1.06%	Christiane Gagnon
Source: Elections Canada

==== Maps ====
1. Beauport
2. Charlesbourg
3. Louis-Hébert
4. Louis-Saint-Laurent
5. Québec
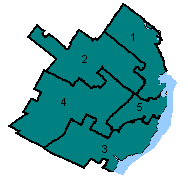
Key map

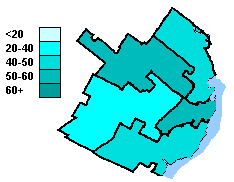
Bloc Québécois

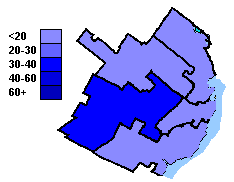
Conservative Party of Canada

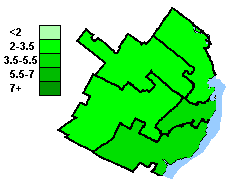
Green Party of Canada

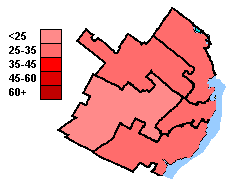
Liberal Party of Canada

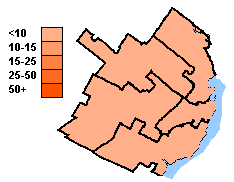
New Democratic Party

=== 2000 ===
Electoral district	Candidates							Incumbent
Electoral district	BQ	Liberal	Canadian Alliance	NDP	PC	Marxist-Leninist	Other	Incumbent
Charlesbourg—Jacques-Cartier	Richard Marceau; 21,867; 38.29%	Isabelle Thiverge; 21,045; 36.85%	Gérard Latulippe; 8,801; 15.41%	Françoise Dicaire; 1,000; 1.75%	Dann Murray; 3,256; 5.70%		Samuel Moisan-Domm (Green); 1,136; 1.99%	Richard Marceau; Charlesbourg
Louis-Hébert	Hélène Alarie; 21,240; 36.88%	Hélène Scherrer; 23,695; 41.14%	Léonce-E. Roy; 5,887; 10.22%	Karl Adomeit; 1,200; 2.08%	Clermont Gauthier; 5,189; 9.01%	Gisèle Desrochers; 382; 0.66%		Hélène Alarie
Quebec	Christiane Gagnon; 22,793; 43.43%	Claudette Tessier-Couture; 18,619; 35.48%	Michel Rivard; 3,980; 7.58%	Jean-Marie Fiset; 1,714; 3.25%	Marc Jalbert; 3,171; 6.04%	Claude Moreau; 255; 0.49%	Pierre-E. Paradis (Mar.); 1,480 2.82% Gilles Rochette (NLP); 482 0.92%	Christiane Gagnon
Quebec East	Jean-Paul Marchand; 21,166; 37.47%	Jean Guy Carignan; 21,813; 38.61%	Robert Martel; 8,594; 15.21%	Majella Desmeules; 1,192; 2.11%	Richard Joncas; 3,727; 6.60%			Jean-Paul Marchand
Source: Elections Canada

=== 1997 ===
Electoral district	Candidates							Incumbent
Electoral district	BQ	Liberal	Reform	NDP	PC	Marxist-Leninist	Natural Law	Incumbent
Charlesbourg	Richard Marceau; 21,556	Jacques Portelance; 17,628	François Ruel; 1,135	Jocelyn Tremblay; 963	Dany Renauld; 13,811	Claude Moreau; 266	Michel Audy; 709	Jean-Marc Jacob
Louis-Hébert	Hélène Alarie; 23,653	Hélène Scherrer; 19,955	Gilles St-Laurent; 1,024	Karl Adomeit; 1,161	Christian Lessard; 13,002		Réal Croteau; 558	Philippe Paré
Quebec	Christiane Gagnon; 24,817	Claudette Tessier-Couture; 18,062		Jean-Marie Fiset; 2,556	Marc Jalbert; 10,309			Christiane Gagnon
Quebec East	Jean-Paul Marchand; 23,245	Remy Poulin; 18,539	Suzanne Bhérer; 1,483	Cécile Rainville; 1,240	Marquis Gagnon; 14,533			Jean-Paul Marchand; Québec-Est
Source: Elections Canada

=== 1993 ===
Electoral district	Candidates							Incumbent
Electoral district	BQ	Liberal	PC	NDP	Natural Law	Abolitionist	Other	Incumbent
Charlesbourg	Jean-Marc Jacob; 38,327	Michel Renaud; 15,084	Monique Tardif; 8,032	Gaston Juneau; 1,446	Michel Audy; 1,743	Nelson Lejeune; 323		Monique Tardif
Louis-Hébert	Philippe Paré; 33,683	Margo Brousseau; 15,596	Suzanne Duplessis; 9,254	Karl Adomeit; 823	Michel Nadeau; 878	Raymond Guimond; 167	Jacques Brochu (PfC); 145	Suzanne Duplessis
Quebec	Christiane Gagnon; 27,788	Jean Pelletier; 13,965	Gilles Loiselle; 7,077	Majella Desmeules; 1,067	Danielle Charland; 883	Ernst Fernandez; 158	Richard Domm (Green); 786	Gilles Loiselle; Langelier
Québec-Est	Jean-Paul Marchand; 34,203	Camil Samson; 14,003	Marcel Tremblay; 6,505	Stéphanie Mitchell; 938	Pierre-Paul Paquet; 1,059	Henri Gagnon; 364	Guy Sanfaçon (Nat.); 255	Marcel Tremblay
Source: Canadian Elections Database

=== 1988 ===
Electoral district	Candidates						Incumbent
Electoral district	PC	Liberal	NDP	Green	Rhinoceros	Other	Incumbent
Charlesbourg	Monique Tardif; 35,549	Paul Vézina; 15,727	Denis Courteau; 7,914				Monique Tardif
Louis-Hébert	Suzanne Duplessis; 37,329	Nicole Duplé; 15,469	Pierre Lavigne; 8,139		Éric Houblon Ouellet; 1,515		Suzanne Duplessis
Langelier	Gilles Loiselle; 24,555	Marielle Guay-Mineault; 14,843	Pauline Gingras; 10,586	Gilles Fontaine; 1,931		France Tremblay (Ind.); 402; Alexandre Roy (Ind.); 319	Michel Côté
Québec-Est	Marcel Tremblay; 29,493	Rémi Bujold; 13,732	Jeanne Lalanne; 7,555	Reine Biron; 906	Jean-François Lehoux; 1,028	Claude Moreau (Ind.); 207	Marcel Tremblay
Source: Canadian Elections Database

=== 1984 ===
Electoral district	Candidates							Incumbent
Electoral district	PC	Liberal	NDP	Parti nationaliste	Social Credit	Rhinoceros	Other	Incumbent
Charlesbourg	Monique Tardif; 37,592	Pierre Bussieres; 22,637	Etienne Tremblay; 7,301	Jean-Nil Jean; 1,088	Robert Robichaud; 469	Jean Vadrouille Frenette; 2,557	Daniel St-Louis (PfC); 84	Pierre Bussieres
Louis-Hébert	Suzanne Duplessis; 29,420	Dennis Dawson; 22,592	Gilles Fiset; 7,548	Jean-Baptiste Giroux; 1,106	Sylvain Desbiens; 184	Hélène Bernier; 2,003	Raymond Boisvert (Ind); 1,153	Dennis Dawson
Langelier	Michel Côté; 16,872	Florence Ievers; 14,004	Majella Desmeules; 4,597	André Binette; 919	Christian Landry; 189	Jean Obélix Lefebvre; 2,576		J. Gilles Lamontagne
Québec-Est	Marcel Tremblay; 19,782	Gérard Duquet; 14,332	Michel Leblanc; 4,189	Jean-Louis Bourque; 790	Serge Bérubé; 239	Michel Fafard; 1,683	Pierre Angers (PfC); 96	Gérard Duquet
Source: Canadian Elections Database
