= Thibaudeau =

Thibaudeau may refer to:

== People ==
- Alfred Thibaudeau (1860–1926), Canadian politician, former senator from Quebec
- Antoine Claire Thibaudeau (1765–1854), French politician
- Colleen Thibaudeau (1925–2012), Canadian poet and short-story writer
- Gilles Thibaudeau (born 1963), Canadian ice hockey player
- Jean Thibaudeau (1935–2013), French author
- Joseph-Élie Thibaudeau (1822–1878), Canadian businessman and politician
- Joseph-Rosaire Thibaudeau (1837–1909), Canadian businessman and politician, former senator from Quebec
- Martin Thibaudeau, actor
- Yvann Thibaudeau (born 1973), Canadian cutter

It is also the given name of:

- Thibaudeau Rinfret (1879–1962), Canadian jurist and Chief Justice of Canada from 1944 to 1954

== Places ==
- Thibaudeau railway station, Manitoba
