= Denis Blanchette =

Canadian politician (born 1956)

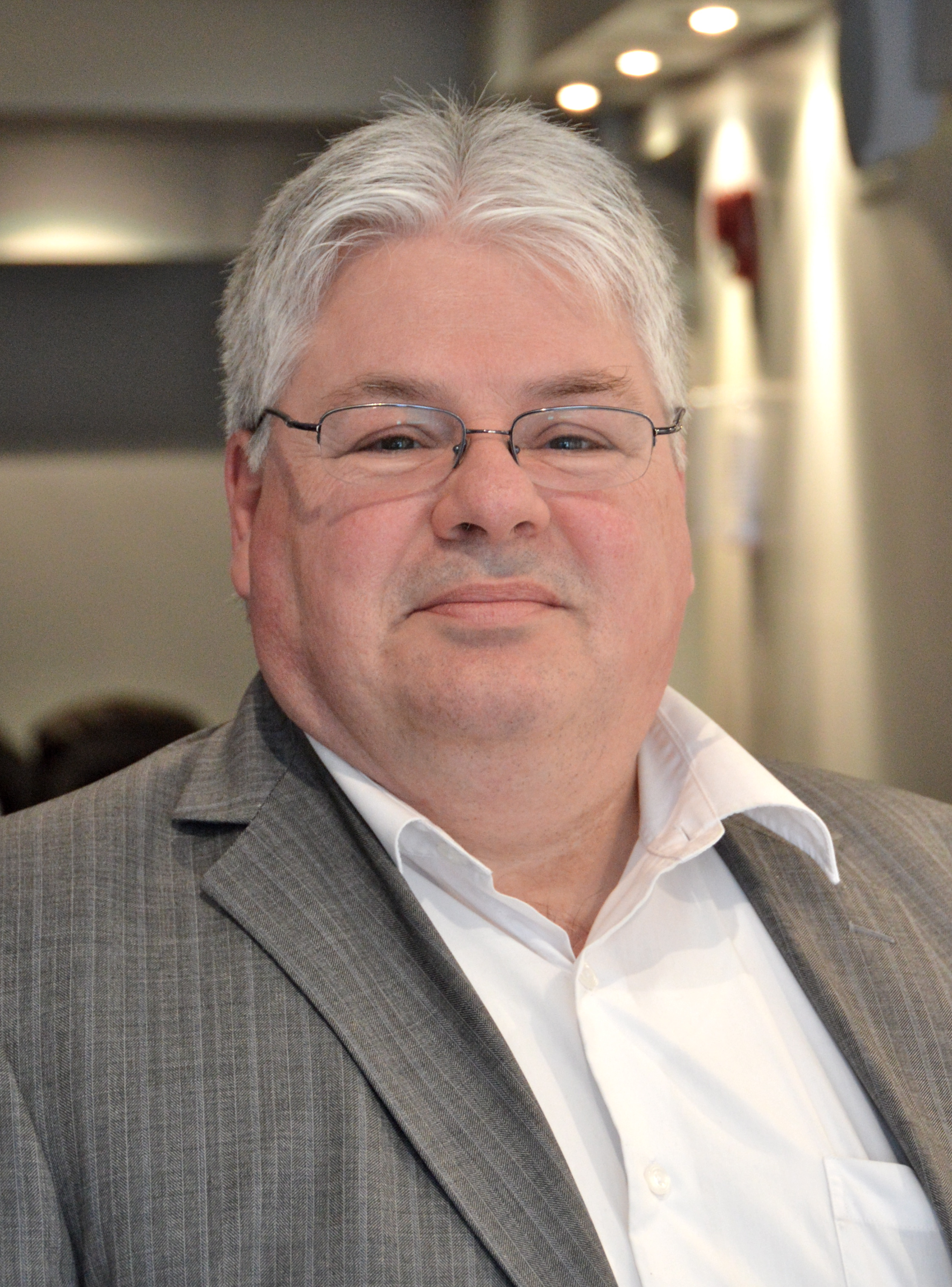
- Blanchette in 2015

Member of Parliament for Louis-Hébert
- In office May 2, 2011 – October 19, 2015
- Preceded by: Pascal-Pierre Paillé
- Succeeded by: Joël Lightbound

Personal details
- Born: September 4, 1956 (age 70) Quebec City, Quebec
- Party: Canadian Future Party (2024–present)
- Other political affiliations: NDP (2006–2021); NDPQ (provincial); Green (2021–2024)
- Profession: Computer analyst, public servant

Denis Blanchette (born September 4, 1956) is a Canadian politician who served as the member of Parliament (MP) for Louis-Hébert from 2011 to 2015. A member of the New Democratic Party (NDP), he was elected to the House of Commons of Canada in the 2011 election.

== Political career ==
Blanchette ran in Louis-Hébert twice, in 2006 and 2008, before being elected. Prior to winning office he was a computer analyst and public servant.

In May 2017 Blanchette was selected as president of the New Democratic Party of Quebec. He was the candidate for the NDPQ in the October 2, 2017 by-election held in the district of Louis-Hébert. He finished 7th with 1.3 per cent of the vote. He resigned as president of the NDPQ in 2018 citing personal reasons. Blanchette again contested Louis-Hébert in the 2021 federal election as a candidate for the Green Party. In February 2024 he joined the national council of the centrist Canadian Future Party.

== Electoral record ==
=== Federal ===
2021 Canadian federal election: Louis-Hébert
Party	Candidate	Votes	%	±%	Expenditures
Liberal	Joël Lightbound	22,933	38.35	-2.16	$51,233.94
Bloc Québécois	Marc Dean	16,247	27.17	-0.83	$22,437.53
Conservative	Gilles Lépine	14,332	23.97	+6.39	$21,615.85
New Democratic	Hamid Nadji	4,337	7.25	-0.62	$5,611.33
Green	Denis Blanchette	1,573	2.63	-1.34	$2,847.44
Independent	Ali Dahan	378	0.63	+0.20	$0.00
Total valid votes/expense limit		59,800	–	–	$111,646.95
Total rejected ballots		861			
Turnout		60,661	74.31	-2.07	
Registered voters		81,632			
Liberal hold		Swing		-0.67	
Source: Elections Canada

==== Louis-Hébert ====
2015 Canadian federal election
Party	Candidate	Votes	%	±%	Expenditures
Liberal	Joël Lightbound	21,516	34.85	+21.43	$61,915.23
Conservative	Jean-Pierre Asselin	16,789	27.19	+5.36	$75,098.22
New Democratic	Denis Blanchette	12,850	20.81	-17.84	$69,979.91
Bloc Québécois	Caroline Pageau	8,900	14.41	-9.80	$31,934.38
Green	Andrée-Anne Beaudoin-Julien	1,561	2.53	+0.88	–
Christian Heritage	Stefan Jetchick	128	0.21	-0.03	–
Total valid votes/expense limit		61,744	100.00		$217,520.39
Total rejected ballots		627	1.01	–	
Turnout		62,371	76.90	–	
Eligible voters		81,109			
Liberal gain from New Democratic		Swing		+19.64	
Source: Elections Canada

2011 Canadian federal election
Party	Candidate	Votes	%	±%	Expenditures
New Democratic	Denis Blanchette	23,373	38.65	+29.32	
Bloc Québécois	Pascal-Pierre Paillé	14,640	24.21	-12.02	
Conservative	Pierre Paul-Hus	13,207	21.84	-6.37	
Liberal	Jean Beaupré	8,110	13.41	-10.18	
Green	Michelle Fontaine	996	1.65	-0.78	
Christian Heritage	Marie-Claude Bouffard	143	0.24	+0.03	
Total valid votes/expense limit		60,469	100.00		
Total rejected ballots		636	1.04		
Turnout		61,105	73.73		
New Democratic gain from Bloc Québécois		Swing		+20.67	

2008 Canadian federal election
Party	Candidate	Votes	%	±%	Expenditures
Bloc Québécois	Pascal-Pierre Paillé	20,992	36.23	+2.15	$78,716
Conservative	Luc Harvey	16,343	28.21	-6.26	$96,878
Liberal	Jean Beaupré	13,669	23.59	+8.58	$42,500
New Democratic	Denis Blanchette	5,403	9.33	+0.26	$7,979
Green	Michelle Fontaine	1,408	2.43	-1.84	
Christian Heritage	Stefan Jetchick	119	0.21	+0.01	$383
Total valid votes/expense limit		57,934	100.00	$87,350	
Total rejected ballots		595	1.02		
Turnout		58,529	70.29		
Bloc Québécois gain from Conservative		Swing		+4.21	

2006 Canadian federal election
Party	Candidate	Votes	%	±%	Expenditures
Conservative	Luc Harvey	20,332	34.47	+21.02	$63,705
Bloc Québécois	Roger Clavet	20,101	34.08	-9.03	$61,438
Liberal	Hélène Scherrer	8,852	15.01	-19.02	$43,177
New Democratic	Denis Blanchette	5,351	9.07	+3.50	$6,274
Green	Robert Hudon	2,517	4.27	+0.44	
Independent	Frédérick Têtu	1,147	1.94	–	$430
Independent	Francis Fortin	565	0.96	–	$460
Christian Heritage	Stefan Jetchick	116	0.20	–	$189
Total valid votes/expense limit		58,981	100.00	$81,438	
Conservative gain from Bloc Québécois		Swing		+15.03	

=== Provincial ===
==== Louis-Hebert ====
Quebec provincial by-election, October 2, 2017 On the resignation of Sam Hamad
Party	Candidate	Votes	%	±%
Coalition Avenir Québec	Geneviève Guilbault	12,091	51.04	+25.12
Liberal	Ihssane El Ghernati	4,433	18.71	-30.51
Parti Québécois	Normand Beauregard	3,852	16.26	-2.11
Québec solidaire	Guillaume Boivin	1,235	5.21	+0.27
Conservative	Sylvie Asselin	976	4.12	+3.29
Green	Alex Tyrrell	487	2.06	–
New Democratic	Denis Blanchette	319	1.35	–
Independent	Vincent Bégin	215	0.91	–
Option nationale	Martin St-Louis	61	0.26	-0.45
Équipe Autonomiste	Jean-Luc Rouckout	18	0.08	–
Total valid votes		23,687	99.20	
Total rejected ballots		190	0.80	
Turnout		23,877	52.43	
Electors on the lists		45,540	–	
Coalition Avenir Québec gain from Liberal		Swing		+27.82
