= Jean Robert Beaulé =

Canadian politician (1927–2005)

Robert Beaulé

Member of the Canadian Parliament for Quebec East
- In office 1962–1965
- Preceded by: Yvon-Roma Tassé
- Succeeded by: Gérard Duquet

Personal details
- Born: June 17, 1927 Capreol, Ontario, Canada
- Died: January 9, 2005 (aged 77) Quebec City, Quebec, Canada
- Party: Social Credit Party of Canada; Ralliement Créditiste
- Profession: Electrician insurance broker railway employee

Jean Robert Beaulé (June 17, 1927 – January 9, 2005) was a Canadian politician, electrician, insurance broker and railway employee. He was elected to the House of Commons of Canada in the 1962 federal election as a Member of the Social Credit Party to represent the riding of Quebec East. He was re-elected in the 1963 election and resigned from the party with other Quebec Social credit MPs to form the Ralliement Créditiste. He was defeated in the 1965 election. He died in 2005 in Quebec City.

1958 Canadian federal election: Quebec East
Party	Candidate	Votes
Progressive Conservative	Yvon Tassé	22,285
Liberal	Maurice Lamontagne	21,649
Social Credit	Jean-Louis Hudon	1,104

1962 Canadian federal election: Quebec East
Party	Candidate	Votes
Social Credit	Jean Robert Beaulé	22,446
Liberal	Maurice Lamontagne	13,747
Progressive Conservative	Yvon Tassé	8,005
New Democratic	Roméo Bilodeau	703

1963 Canadian federal election: Quebec East
Party	Candidate	Votes
Social Credit	Jean Robert Beaulé	18,661
Liberal	Albert Parent	16,976
Progressive Conservative	Gaston Michaud	6,593
New Democratic	Paul-Henri Dufresne	1,450
Nationalist	Léo Tremblay	540

1965 Canadian federal election: Quebec East
Party	Candidate	Votes
Liberal	Gérard Duquet	18,900
Ralliement créditiste	Jean Robert Beaulé	13,642
Progressive Conservative	Robert Perron	5,546
New Democratic	Raymond Bruneau	2,870
