= Tourangeau =

Tourangeau is a French term for a person from the city of Tours.

It can also refer to:

- Adolphe Guillet dit Tourangeau (1831–1894), Québecois politician
- Huguette Tourangeau (1938–2018), Québecois opera singer
- the Oïl dialect spoken in the province of Touraine
