= Yvon Tassé =

Canadian politician

Yvon-Roma Tassé

Member of the Canadian Parliament for Quebec East
- In office 31 March 1958 – 17 June 1962
- Preceded by: Louis St. Laurent
- Succeeded by: Jean Robert Beaulé

Personal details
- Born: 1 October 1910 Saint-Gabriel-de-Brandon, Quebec
- Died: 28 August 1998 (aged 87) Quebec City, Quebec
- Party: Progressive Conservative
- Profession: civil engineer

Yvon-Roma Tassé, CM (1 October 1910 – 28 August 1998) was a Progressive Conservative party member of the House of Commons of Canada.

Tassé was born in Saint-Gabriel-de-Brandon, Quebec and became a civil engineer by trade. He was instrumental in opening the Saint Lawrence River for ships during the winter season.

His first federal election campaign was at the Quebec South electoral district for a by-election in September 1955. In the 1958 general election, he won the Quebec East riding and served one term, the 24th Canadian Parliament during which he was Parliamentary Secretary to the Minister of Public Works from November 1959 to November 1961 and again for the first four months of 1962. Tassé was defeated in the 1962 election by Jean Robert Beaulé of the Social Credit party.

In 1993, Tassé was awarded the Order of Canada. He died on 28 August 1998.
