= Isidore Thibaudeau =

Canadian politician

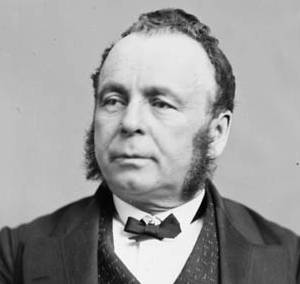

Member of the House of Commons of Canada for Quebec East
- In office 1874–1877
- Preceded by: Adolphe Guillet dit Tourangeau
- Succeeded by: Wilfrid Laurier

Member of the Legislative Council of Quebec for Kennebec division
- In office 1867–1874
- Succeeded by: Louis Richard

Member of the Legislative Assembly of the Province of Canada for Quebec-Centre
- In office 1863–1867
- Preceded by: Georges-Honoré Simard
- Succeeded by: Legislature abolished

President of the Executive Council of the Province of Canada
- In office May 16, 1863 – March 29, 1864

Personal details
- Born: September 30, 1819 Cap-Santé, Lower Canada
- Died: August 18, 1893 (aged 73) Quebec City, Quebec
- Party: Liberal
- Spouse: Laure Drolet
- Children: Alfred Thibaudeau, Senator
- Relatives: Joseph-Rosaire Thibaudeau (brother), Senator

Isidore Thibaudeau (September 30, 1819 – August 18, 1893) was a Quebec businessman and political figure. He represented Quebec East in the House of Commons of Canada as a Liberal from 1874 to 1877.

He was born Pierre-Isidore Thibaudeau in Pointe-aux-Trembles, Lower Canada in 1819; his father was a merchant of Acadian origin. He worked as a clerk in the Quebec City branch of a firm based in Montreal. In 1847, he became a partner in the branch and, in 1856, a partner in the Montreal operation. Thibaudeau brought his brothers and later his son into the company. He helped establish two banks, the Caisse d’Épargnes de Notre-Dame de Québec and the Banque Nationale, serving as president of the latter from 1879 to 1889. In 1863, he was elected to the Legislative Assembly of the Province of Canada for Quebec-Centre. In the same year, he was named president of the Executive Council, serving until 1864. He opposed Confederation. Thibaudeau served as a member of the Legislative Council of Quebec from 1867 to 1874, when he was elected to the federal parliament. He resigned his seat in 1877 to give Wilfrid Laurier a seat in the house and left politics in 1878 after running unsuccessfully for another federal seat. By 1889, he had become a millionaire.

He died in Quebec City in 1893.

His brother Joseph-Élie also served in the legislative assembly for the Province of Canada and brother Joseph-Rosaire was a member of the Senate of Canada.

His daughter Laura married Esdras Alfred de St-Georges, who served in the Canadian House of Commons.

Parliament of Canada
Preceded by Adolphe Guillet dit Tourangeau	Member of Parliament from Quebec East; 1874–1877	Succeeded by Wilfrid Laurier
