= Marie-Françoise Mégie =

Canadian physician

The Honourable Marie-Françoise Mégie
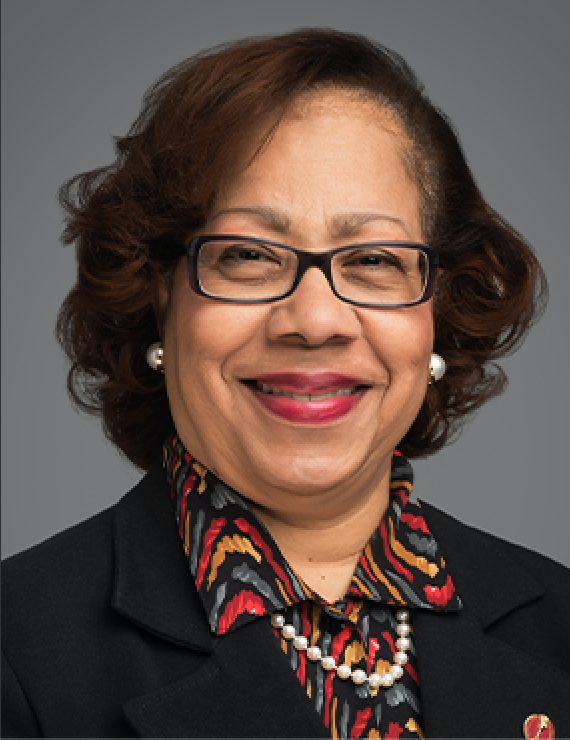

Canadian Senator from Quebec (Rougemont)
- In office November 25, 2016 – September 20, 2025
- Nominated by: Justin Trudeau
- Appointed by: David Johnston
- Preceded by: Suzanne Duplessis
- Succeeded by: Richard Martel

Personal details
- Born: September 21, 1950 (age 76)
- Party: Independent Senators Group

Marie-Françoise Mégie (born September 21, 1950) is a Canadian physician, university professor at the Université de Montreal and former member of the Independent Senators Group in the Senate of Canada. Born in Jacmel, Haiti, she moved to Quebec in 1976. She served as a senator until her mandatory retirement in 2025, on her 75th birthday.

== Biography ==
=== Education and career ===
Mégie was born in Jacmel, Haiti, and completed her primary and secondary education there. In July 1974, she obtained her medical degree from the Faculty of Medicine and Pharmacy at the Université d'État d'Haïti, in Port-au-Prince.

In November 1976, Mégie arrived in Quebec and decided to pursue her career as a physician there. She completed a rotating internship, allowing her to obtain her license from the Medical Council of Canada, and officially carried the title of "Doctor" in Canada, in 1981. In June 1981, she passed the examination of the Federation of State Medical Boards of the United States. Then, in July 1981, she received her diploma from the Corporation des Médecins du Québec (now the Collège des médecins du Québec).

In October 1981, she joined the Centre local de services communautaires (CLSC) du Marigot in Laval and worked in home care with the elderly, the severely handicapped, and people approaching the end of life. Before becoming medical director of the Laval palliative care center, she also worked at the CLSC St-Louis-du-Parc, at the residence Les Maronniers (a high-rise apartment building for retirees) and at the Long-term care center (CHSLD) in Dollard-des-Ormeaux.

She then pursued her career in teaching. She became an associate professor in the Department of Family Medicine and Emergency Medicine at the Université de Montréal. There, she was involved in the development of a home care internship, which became mandatory for family medicine residents. Mégie also served on the Elder Care Curriculum Review Committee. She worked at the Université de Montréal for almost 30 years.

Mégie taught multisystemic diseases, clinical reasoning, ethics in geriatric practice, and palliative care. She also taught elder care in the family medicine residency. In addition to that, she was responsible for organizing care of the elderly and geriatrics internships for family medicine residents at the CLSC. She also taught residents about medical ethics and consent to care. Mégie conducted thematic activities on the treatment of pressure ulcers.

Throughout her career, she participated as an organizer or speaker at several national and international conferences. In the '90s, Mégie participated in Health & Aging research in Canada, by studying the incidence of Alzheimer's disease. She examined patients in the IMAGE project - a research on the genetic aspects of Alzheimer's disease. In 2004, she became a co-researcher in the prevalence study of chronic wounds in home care, which evaluated the phenomenon in the 140 CLSCs in the province of Quebec. She also was an expert in the study on the indicators of quality and continuity of health care services provided to the elderly.

She obtained a grant from the Conseil québécois de développement professionnel continu des médecins for the development and validation of an evaluation grid for medical training sites on the Internet. She presented her medical specialties in a dozen of conferences, for the Fédération des médecins omnipraticiens du Québec (FMOQ). She also participates in conferences organized by the Canadian Association of Wound Care.

==== Senator Mégie in the Senate of Canada ====
She was appointed to Senate on November 25, 2016, by Prime Minister Justin Trudeau. She officially entered office on December 2, 2016 as an independent senator from Rougemont. As a member of the Senate, she has been a part of the Standing Committee of Social Affairs, Science and Technology (SOCI), the Standing Committee of Official Languages (OLLO), the Standing Committee of Agriculture and Forestry (AGFO), and the Standing Committee on Aboriginal Peoples (APPA). In 2018, she gave a speech, in which she recommended caution and data collection for research regarding Bill C-45 on cannabis. In 2019, she gave a speech in support of the Canadian Accessibility Act.

She also became the Senate sponsor of Bill C-243 - the National Maternity Assistance Program Strategy Act.

The Honourable Senator supported Senator Moodie's motion to bring to the attention of the Senate the important issue of vaccine hesitancy and the corresponding threats to public health. This motion is prescient of the vaccine hesitancy that would slow down the vaccination campaign to end the COVID-19 pandemic.

The Senator is also a member of the Parliamentary Black Caucus, whose mission is to prioritize issues affecting Black communities in Canada. In 2020, after the tragic events surrounding the murder of George Floyd, she participated in the drafting, with the help of other members, of the Statement by the Parliamentary Black Caucus. This document urges the government to take concrete steps to fight against systemic racism in Canada. She has asked for the Senate's consent to table the Declaration. The Senator then introduced a motion for the Senate to go into a plenary session to receive Ministers and discuss the government's role in combating racism.

During the Senate's subsequent study of racism, the Honourable Senator Mégie made a landmark speech that included the recommendations of the Parliamentary Black Caucus.

In 2021, she was elected to the Independent Senators Group, and was appointed member of the Special Joint Committee of the Senate and House of Commons. This committee was established to review the terms of the Criminal Code regarding medically assisted dying and its application, particularly issues related to mature minors, advance directives, mental illness, the state of palliative care in Canada, and the protection of Canadians with disabilities.

=== Professional associations ===
The senator is a member of several professional associations. In 1993, she joined the Société québécoise de gériatrie. In 1995, she became a member of the Association Médicale Haïtienne à l'Étranger, where she served as vice-president from 1997 to 1998, and then as president for five years. From 2014 to 2017, she was president of the Association Médecins francophones du Canada (AMLFC), which later became Médecins francophones du Canada. She was also the editor of the AMLFC Bulletin.

She helped set up the Maison de soins palliatifs de Laval, which opened in 2009. There, she served as medical director until 2016. She joined the board of directors of this residence and then became its vice-president.

== Awards ==
- June 2001: Award from the Régie régionale de la santé et des services sociaux de Laval (now called the Centre intégré de santé et de services sociaux de Laval) for her book on in-home health care services.
- October 2001: Gilles des Rosiers Award from the Fédération des médecins omnipraticiens du Québec for contributing to the education of her peers.
