= Louis-Hébert (federal electoral district) =

Federal electoral district in Quebec, Canada

Coordinates: 46°46′30″N 71°17′50″W

Quebec electoral district
- Interactive map of riding boundaries from the 2025 federal election

Federal electoral district
- Legislature: House of Commons
MP
Joël Lightbound
Liberal
- District created: 1966
- First contested: 1968
- Last contested: 2021
- District webpage: profile, map

Demographics
- Population (2011): 103,346
- Electors (2019): 81,131
- Area (km²): 97
- Pop. density (per km²): 1,065.4
- Census division: Quebec City
- Census subdivision: Quebec City (part)

Louis-Hébert (French pronunciation: [lwi ebɛʁ]) is a federal electoral district in the Canadian province of Quebec. Represented in the House of Commons since 1968, its population was certified, according to the detailed statistics of 2001, as 98,156.

== Geography ==
The district, in the Quebec region of Capitale-Nationale, consists of the southern part of Quebec City, and is largely coextensive with the borough of Sainte-Foy–Sillery–Cap-Rouge. It is based mostly on the former city of Sainte-Foy, which was merged into the "megacity" of Quebec City in 2002.

The neighbouring ridings are Portneuf—Jacques-Cartier, Louis-Saint-Laurent, Québec, Lévis—Bellechasse, and Lotbinière—Chutes-de-la-Chaudière.

The riding lost small fractions of territory to Louis-Saint-Laurent and Québec as a result of the 2012 electoral redistribution.

Following the 2022 Canadian federal electoral redistribution, the riding lost the area east of Av. Maguire to Québec Centre.

== Demographics ==
According to the 2011 Canadian census

Ethnic groups: 91.3% White, 2.2% Indigenous, 1.8% Arab, 1.6% Latino, 1.4% Black, 0.6% Chinese, 1.1% other
Languages: 91.2% French, 2.2% English, 1.6% Spanish, 1.4% Arabic, 3.6% other
Religions: 82.6% Christian, 2.5% Muslim, 0.6% other, 14.3% none
Median income: $34,624 (2010)
Average income: $45,439 (2010)

== History ==
The electoral district was created in 1966 from Quebec East, Quebec South, Quebec West, and Québec—Montmorency ridings. The riding is notable for having had nine different people represent the riding since 1984; Suzanne Duplessis was elected that year and served two terms in the House of Commons until 1993. From then until 2019, every subsequent MP to represent the district was either defeated in the next election or retired from politics after a single term.

=== Members of parliament ===
This riding has elected the following members of parliament:

Parliament	Years	Member	Party
Louis-Hébert; Riding created from Quebec East, Quebec South, Quebec West and Québec—Montmorency
28th	1968–1972	Jean-Charles Cantin	Liberal
29th	1972–1974	Albanie Morin	Liberal
30th	1974–1976	Albanie Morin	Liberal
30th	1977–1979	Dennis Dawson	Liberal
31st	1979–1980	Dennis Dawson	Liberal
32nd	1980–1984	Dennis Dawson	Liberal
33rd	1984–1988	Suzanne Duplessis	Progressive Conservative
34th	1988–1993	Suzanne Duplessis	Progressive Conservative
35th	1993–1997	Philippe Paré	Bloc Québécois
36th	1997–2000	Hélène Alarie	Bloc Québécois
37th	2000–2004	Hélène Scherrer	Liberal
38th	2004–2006	Roger Clavet	Bloc Québécois
39th	2006–2008	Luc Harvey	Conservative
40th	2008–2011	Pascal-Pierre Paillé	Bloc Québécois
41st	2011–2015	Denis Blanchette	New Democratic
42nd	2015–2019	Joël Lightbound	Liberal
43rd	2019–2021	Joël Lightbound	Liberal
44th	2021–2025	Joël Lightbound	Liberal
45th	2025–present	Joël Lightbound	Liberal

== Election results ==
Election results in Louis-Hébert 1966-present (minor parties that never got 2% of the vote or didn't run consistently are omitted) View source data.

2025 Canadian federal election
Party	Candidate	Votes	%	±%	Expenditures
Liberal	Joël Lightbound	33,512	55.44	+17.23	
Bloc Québécois	Valérie Savard	12,897	21.34	-5.66	
Conservative	Claude Dussault	12,164	20.12	-4.19	
New Democratic	Jean-Paul Lussiaà-Berdou	1,540	2.55	-4.68	
People's	Vatthana Maholy	332	0.55	N/A	
Total valid votes/expense limit		60,445	98.81		
Total rejected ballots		729	1.19		
Turnout		61,174	76.95		
Eligible voters		79,502			
Liberal notional hold		Swing		+11.45	
Source: Elections Canada
Note: number of eligible voters does not include voting day registrations.

2021 federal election redistributed results
Party	Vote	%
Liberal	21,704	38.21
Bloc Québécois	15,337	27.00
Conservative	13,805	24.31
New Democratic	4,107	7.23
Green	1,478	2.60
Others	365	0.64

2021 Canadian federal election
Party	Candidate	Votes	%	±%	Expenditures
Liberal	Joël Lightbound	22,933	38.35	-2.16	$51,233.94
Bloc Québécois	Marc Dean	16,247	27.17	-0.83	$22,437.53
Conservative	Gilles Lépine	14,332	23.97	+6.39	$21,615.85
New Democratic	Hamid Nadji	4,337	7.25	-0.62	$5,611.33
Green	Denis Blanchette	1,573	2.63	-1.34	$2,847.44
Independent	Ali Dahan	378	0.63	+0.20	$0.00
Total valid votes/expense limit		59,800	–	–	$111,646.95
Total rejected ballots		861			
Turnout		60,661	74.31	-2.07	
Registered voters		81,632			
Liberal hold		Swing		-0.67	
Source: Elections Canada

2019 Canadian federal election
Party	Candidate	Votes	%	±%	Expenditures
Liberal	Joël Lightbound	25,140	40.51	+5.66	$82,402.61
Bloc Québécois	Christian Hébert	17,375	28.00	+13.59	$49,988.85
Conservative	Marie-Josée Guérette	10,912	17.58	-9.61	$54,059.24
New Democratic	Jérémie Juneau	4,884	7.87	-12.94	none listed
Green	Macarena Diab	2,466	3.97	+1.44	none listed
People's	Daniel Brisson	1,016	1.64	–	none listed
Independent	Ali Dahan	267	0.43	–	$0.00
Total valid votes		62,060	98.61	–	
Total rejected ballots		873	1.39	–	
Turnout		62,933	76.38	–	
Eligible voters		82,395	–	–	
Liberal hold		Swing		-3.97	
Source: Elections Canada

2015 Canadian federal election
Party	Candidate	Votes	%	±%	Expenditures
Liberal	Joël Lightbound	21,516	34.85	+21.43	$61,915.23
Conservative	Jean-Pierre Asselin	16,789	27.19	+5.36	$75,098.22
New Democratic	Denis Blanchette	12,850	20.81	-17.84	$69,979.91
Bloc Québécois	Caroline Pageau	8,900	14.41	-9.80	$31,934.38
Green	Andrée-Anne Beaudoin-Julien	1,561	2.53	+0.88	–
Christian Heritage	Stefan Jetchick	128	0.21	-0.03	–
Total valid votes/expense limit		61,744	100.00		$217,520.39
Total rejected ballots		627	1.01	–	
Turnout		62,371	76.90	–	
Eligible voters		81,109			
Liberal gain from New Democratic		Swing		+19.64	
Source: Elections Canada

2011 federal election redistributed results
Party	Vote	%
New Democratic	23,358	38.65
Bloc Québécois	14,635	24.22
Conservative	13,194	21.83
Liberal	8,108	13.42
Green	996	1.65
Others	143	0.24

2011 Canadian federal election
Party	Candidate	Votes	%	±%	Expenditures
New Democratic	Denis Blanchette	23,373	38.65	+29.32	
Bloc Québécois	Pascal-Pierre Paillé	14,640	24.21	-12.02	
Conservative	Pierre Paul-Hus	13,207	21.84	-6.37	
Liberal	Jean Beaupré	8,110	13.41	-10.18	
Green	Michelle Fontaine	996	1.65	-0.78	
Christian Heritage	Marie-Claude Bouffard	143	0.24	+0.03	
Total valid votes/expense limit		60,469	100.00		
Total rejected ballots		636	1.04		
Turnout		61,105	73.73		
New Democratic gain from Bloc Québécois		Swing		+20.67	

2008 Canadian federal election
Party	Candidate	Votes	%	±%	Expenditures
Bloc Québécois	Pascal-Pierre Paillé	20,992	36.23	+2.15	$78,716
Conservative	Luc Harvey	16,343	28.21	-6.26	$96,878
Liberal	Jean Beaupré	13,669	23.59	+8.58	$42,500
New Democratic	Denis Blanchette	5,403	9.33	+0.26	$7,979
Green	Michelle Fontaine	1,408	2.43	-1.84	
Christian Heritage	Stefan Jetchick	119	0.21	+0.01	$383
Total valid votes/expense limit		57,934	100.00	$87,350	
Total rejected ballots		595	1.02		
Turnout		58,529	70.29		
Bloc Québécois gain from Conservative		Swing		+4.21	

2006 Canadian federal election
Party	Candidate	Votes	%	±%	Expenditures
Conservative	Luc Harvey	20,332	34.47	+21.02	$63,705
Bloc Québécois	Roger Clavet	20,101	34.08	-9.03	$61,438
Liberal	Hélène Scherrer	8,852	15.01	-19.02	$43,177
New Democratic	Denis Blanchette	5,351	9.07	+3.50	$6,274
Green	Robert Hudon	2,517	4.27	+0.44	
Independent	Frédérick Têtu	1,147	1.94	–	$430
Independent	Francis Fortin	565	0.96	–	$460
Christian Heritage	Stefan Jetchick	116	0.20	–	$189
Total valid votes/expense limit		58,981	100.00	$81,438	
Conservative gain from Bloc Québécois		Swing		+15.03	

2004 Canadian federal election
Party	Candidate	Votes	%	±%	Expenditures
Bloc Québécois	Roger Clavet	24,071	43.11	+6.23	$57,547
Liberal	Hélène Scherrer	18,999	34.03	-7.11	$58,530
Conservative	Clermont Gauthier	7,512	13.45	-5.78	$11,262
New Democratic	Robert Turcotte	3,112	5.57	+3.49	$2,646
Green	Jean-Pierre Guay	2,137	3.83	–	
Total valid votes/expense limit		55,831	100.00	$80,654	
Bloc Québécois gain from Liberal		Swing		+6.67	

Note: Conservative vote is compared to the total of the Canadian Alliance vote and Progressive Conservative vote in the 2000 election.

2000 Canadian federal election
Party	Candidate	Votes	%	±%
Liberal	Hélène Scherrer	23,695	41.14	+7.52
Bloc Québécois	Hélène Alarie	21,240	36.88	-2.97
Alliance	Léonce-E. Roy	5,887	10.22	+8.50
Progressive Conservative	Clermont Gauthier	5,189	9.01	-12.90
New Democratic	Karl Adomeit	1,200	2.08	+0.13
Marxist–Leninist	Gisèle Desrochers	382	0.66	
Total valid votes		57,593	100.00	
Liberal gain from Bloc Québécois		Swing		+5.25

Note: Canadian Alliance vote is compared to the Reform vote in 1997 election.

1997 Canadian federal election
Party	Candidate	Votes	%	±%
Bloc Québécois	Hélène Alarie	23,653	39.85	-15.78
Liberal	Hélène Scherrer	19,955	33.62	+7.86
Progressive Conservative	Christian Lessard	13,002	21.91	+6.62
New Democratic	Karl Adomeit	1,161	1.96	+0.60
Reform	Gilles St-Laurent	1,024	1.73	
Natural Law	Réal Croteau	558	0.94	-0.51
Total valid votes		59,353	100.00	
Bloc Québécois hold		Swing		+11.82

1993 Canadian federal election
Party	Candidate	Votes	%	±%
Bloc Québécois	Philippe Paré	33,683	55.63	
Liberal	Margo Brousseau	15,596	25.76	+0.99
Progressive Conservative	Suzanne Duplessis	9,254	15.28	-44.49
Natural Law	Michel Nadeau	878	1.45	
New Democratic	Karl Adomeit	823	1.36	-11.67
Abolitionist	Raymond Guimond	167	0.28	
Commonwealth of Canada	Jacques Brochu	145	0.24	
Total valid votes		60,546	100.00	
Bloc Québécois gain from Progressive Conservative		Swing		–

1988 Canadian federal election
Party	Candidate	Votes	%	±%
Progressive Conservative	Suzanne Duplessis	37,329	59.77	+13.81
Liberal	Nicole Duplé	15,469	24.77	-10.53
New Democratic	Pierre Lavigne	8,139	13.03	+1.24
Rhinoceros	Éric Houblon Ouellet	1,515	2.43	-0.70
Total valid votes		62,452	100.00	
Progressive Conservative hold		Swing		+12.17

1984 Canadian federal election
Party	Candidate	Votes	%	±%
Progressive Conservative	Suzanne Duplessis	29,420	45.96	+35.58
Liberal	Dennis Dawson	22,592	35.30	-29.46
New Democratic	Gilles Fiset	7,548	11.79	-2.19
Rhinoceros	Hélène Bernier	2,003	3.13	-4.05
Independent	Raymond Boisvert	1,153	1.80	
Parti nationaliste	Jean-Baptiste Giroux	1,106	1.73	
Social Credit	Sylvain Desbiens	184	0.29	-2.07
Total valid votes		64,006	100.00	
Progressive Conservative gain from Liberal		Swing		+32.52

1980 Canadian federal election
Party	Candidate	Votes	%	±%
Liberal	Dennis Dawson	34,231	64.75	-1.25
New Democratic	Robert Caron	7,392	13.98	+3.86
Progressive Conservative	Michel Doyon	5,490	10.39	+4.60
Rhinoceros	François Ouellet	3,795	7.18	
Social Credit	Jean-Paul Rhéaume	1,247	2.36	-13.83
Union populaire	Henri Laberge	596	1.13	-0.17
Marxist–Leninist	Lynda Forgues	112	0.21	-0.40
Total valid votes		52,863	100.00	

1979 Canadian federal election
Party	Candidate	Votes	%	±%
Liberal	Dennis Dawson	37,908	66.00	-6.25
Social Credit	Henri Gariépy	9,297	16.19	+12.31
New Democratic	Jean Daoust	5,812	10.12	
Progressive Conservative	Maxime Langlois	3,322	5.78	-15.69
Union populaire	Michel Tremblay	746	1.30	
Marxist–Leninist	Lynda Forgues	351	0.61	
Total valid votes		57,436	100.00	

Canadian federal by-election, 24 May 1977
Party	Candidate	Votes	%	±%
On Mrs. Morin's death, 1 October 1976
Liberal	Dennis Dawson	30,763	72.25	+4.22
Progressive Conservative	Jean Lavoie	9,142	21.47	+10.57
Social Credit	Daniel Boulay	1,652	3.88	-1.99
Communist	Hervé Fuyet	1,021	2.40	
Total valid votes		42,578	100.00	

1974 Canadian federal election
Party	Candidate	Votes	%	±%
Liberal	Albanie Morin	32,441	68.03	+10.21
New Democratic	Françoise Gamache Stanton	6,829	14.32	-0.17
Progressive Conservative	Blanche Boucher	5,201	10.91	-3.24
Social Credit	Rosaire Proulx	2,799	5.87	-2.86
Marxist–Leninist	Robert Lapointe	419	0.88	
Total valid votes		47,689	100.00	

1972 Canadian federal election
Party	Candidate	Votes	%	±%
Liberal	Albanie Morin	30,928	57.82	-6.49
New Democratic	Françoise Stanton	7,750	14.49	+9.81
Progressive Conservative	Cécile Bergeron	7,566	14.14	-4.48
Social Credit	Ghislaine Clavet	4,672	8.73	-3.65
Independent	Lisette Pouliot	1,490	2.79	
Independent	Henri Tremblay	1,085	2.03	
Total valid votes		53,491	100.00	

Note: Social Credit vote is compared to Ralliement créditiste vote in the 1968 election.

1968 Canadian federal election
Party	Candidate	Votes	%
Liberal	Jean-Charles Cantin	28,220	64.31
Progressive Conservative	Gérard Berlinguette	8,174	18.63
Ralliement créditiste	Jean Turgeon	5,433	12.38
New Democratic	Gaétan Dutil	2,054	4.68
Total valid votes		43,881	100.00

== See also ==
- List of Canadian electoral districts
- Historical federal electoral districts of Canada
