= Joseph-Élie Thibaudeau =

Joseph-Élie Thibaudeau (September 2, 1822 – January 5, 1878) was a Quebec businessman and political figure.

He was born at Cap-Santé, Lower Canada in 1822 and became a merchant there. He was also justice of the peace and a captain in the militia. Thibaudeau was elected to represent Portneuf in the Legislative Assembly of the Province of Canada in 1854 and 1857. He was president of the Executive Council and minister of agriculture in 1858. In 1863, he was named registrar for Portneuf County and served in that post until his death at Cap-Santé in 1878.

His brother Isidore was a member of the Canadian House of Commons and his brother Joseph-Rosaire was a member of the Canadian Senate.
