= Donat Raymond =

Canadian politician and builder

The Honourable Donat Raymond
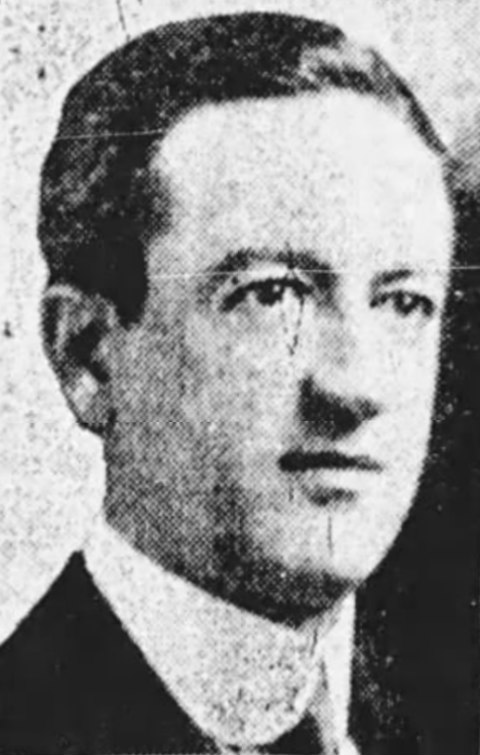
- Raymond c. 1921

Senator for De la Vallière, Quebec
- In office December 20, 1926 – June 5, 1963
- Appointed by: William Lyon Mackenzie King
- Preceded by: Alfred Thibaudeau
- Succeeded by: Romuald Bourque

Personal details
- Born: January 3, 1880 Saint-Stanislas-de-Kostka, Quebec, Canada
- Died: June 5, 1963 (aged 83)
- Party: Liberal
- Occupation: Financier

Joseph Donat Raymond (January 3, 1880 – June 5, 1963) was a Canadian Senator and builder in the National Hockey League.

== Biography ==
Born in Saint-Stanislas-de-Kostka, Quebec, Donat Raymond was a member of the Canadian Senate as a Liberal Party from 1926 to 1963. He was also head of the Canadian Arena Company that helped designed arenas throughout Canada. One of the major arenas he re-built was the Montreal Forum in 1968. One of his final acts was to approve the financing and plans of the arena before he died. He won the Stanley Cup seven times, twice with the Montreal Maroons in 1926 and 1935, and five times with Montreal Canadiens in 1944, 1946, 1953, 1956 and 1957.

He was inducted into the Hockey Hall of Fame in 1958.

His brothers were hotel entrepreneur Joseph-Aldéric Raymond, proprietor of Maison Joseph-Aldéric Raymond, and Canadian politician Maxime Raymond.
