= Thomas Pope (Canadian politician) =

Canadian politician

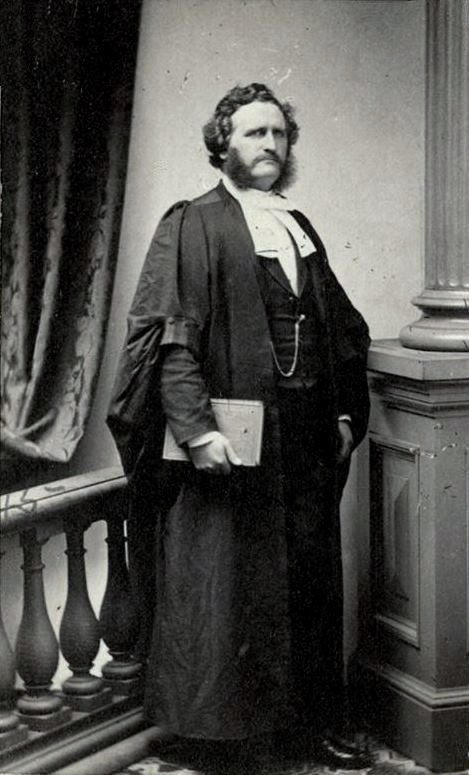
- Born: October 6, 1825; Prescott, Upper Canada
- Died: June 29, 1863 (aged 37); Quebec City, Lower Canada
- Occupations: lawyer, politician

Thomas Pope (October 6, 1825 – June 29, 1863) was a Canadian independent politician and served as the eleventh mayor of Quebec City. He was in power from January 22, 1861, to January 29, 1863 (a total of two years and seven days), before being replaced by Adolphe Guillet dit Tourangeau. He replaced Hector-Louis Langevin and was the city's last non-Francophone mayor.

== Early years ==
Pope was born on October 6, 1825, in Prescott, Upper Canada, to Scottish immigrants and was later educated in Scotland before moving to Canada East.

== Legal and political career ==
After returning from his studies he became a lawyer after articling under Jean-François-Joseph Duval, whom later became Chief Justice of Quebec. Before becoming mayor Pope served on Quebec City Council from 1858 to 1861.

== Death ==
Pope died in office on June 29, 1863 and buried at Notre-Dame-de-Belmont Cemetery in Quebec City.

== Legacy ==
A short residential street, rue Thomas-Pope, in Quebec City is named for him.
