= Jean-Guy Carignan =

Canadian politician

Member of Parliament for Quebec East
- In office 2000–2004
- Preceded by: Jean-Paul Marchand
- Succeeded by: riding dissolved

Personal details
- Born: 3 May 1941 (age 85) Victoriaville, Quebec, Canada
- Party: Liberal; Independent Liberal / Independent
- Profession: administrator

Jean-Guy Carignan (born 3 May 1941 in Victoriaville, Quebec) is a Canadian politician who served as a member of the House of Commons of Canada from 2000 to 2004. He was an administrator by career.

== Career ==
Carignan joined the 37th Canadian Parliament on 27 November 2000 after being elected a Liberal member for the Quebec East electoral district.

On his election day, however, he was charged with offences relating to a hit and run incident on 3 October 2000. He pleaded guilty to these charges on 6 November 2001 and was sentenced to a partial house arrest and 100 hours of community service that allowed him to attend the House of Commons. He resigned from the Liberal party on 14 December 2001 and continued as an independent member of Parliament.

He declared himself an "Independent Liberal" for a year, beginning 7 October 2002. On 8 October 2003 he rejoined the Liberal party for two days, with Jean Chrétien calling for his resignation after it was learned he did not yet complete his sentence for his 2001 conviction.

Further controversy ensued following a mailing of 2000 Christmas cards featuring a picture of Carignan with Palestinian leader Yasser Arafat. Groups such as the Canadian Jewish Congress and the B'nai B'rith Canada's League for Human Rights condemned the MP's choice of seasonal greetings.

For the 2004 election, Carignan ran as an independent in Louis-Saint-Laurent, essentially a reconfigured version of his old riding. He finished in sixth place while Bernard Cleary of the Bloc Québécois won the riding.
