= Josée Verner =

Canadian politician (born 1959)

The Honourable Josée Verner PC

Deputy Leader of the Canadian Senators Group
- In office November 4, 2019 – May 14, 2021
- Leader: Scott Tannas
- Preceded by: Position established
- Succeeded by: Dennis Patterson

Canadian Senator from Quebec (Montarville)
- Incumbent
- Assumed office June 13, 2011
- Nominated by: Stephen Harper
- Appointed by: David Johnston
- Preceded by: Raymond Lavigne

Member of Parliament for Louis-Saint-Laurent
- In office January 23, 2006 – May 2, 2011
- Preceded by: Bernard Cleary
- Succeeded by: Alexandrine Latendresse

Personal details
- Born: December 30, 1959 (age 66) Gatineau, Quebec, Canada
- Party: Canadian Senators Group (2019–present); Conservative (provincial; 2021–present)
- Other political affiliations: Independent Senators Group (2017–2019); Conservative (federal; 2004–2017); ADQ/CAQ (provincial; until 2021)
- Spouse: Marc Lacroix
- Profession: Politician; staffer

Josée Verner, PC (born December 30, 1959) is a Canadian politician. She represented the electoral district of Louis-Saint-Laurent in the House of Commons of Canada from 2006 to 2011 as a member of the Conservative Party of Canada. She also served as a minister in the Cabinet of Prime Minister Stephen Harper serving as Minister of Intergovernmental Affairs, President of the Queen's Privy Council for Canada and Minister for La Francophonie. On May 18, 2011, it was announced that she would be appointed to the Senate of Canada following the loss of her Commons seat in the 2011 federal election. She was formally appointed on June 13, 2011.

== Political career ==
More recently a member of the provincial Action démocratique du Québec and the federal Conservative Party of Canada, Verner had previously worked as a political staffer in Quebec City in the Robert Bourassa government. Verner has spent almost 20 years in the communications and public service fields.

She was a candidate for the Conservatives in the 2004 federal election and finished second with 31% of the vote, the party's best Quebec showing, in a three-way race that was won by the Bloc Québécois's Bernard Cleary. This was contrasted with her victory in a two-way race in 2006.

Looking to boost the party's profile in Quebec, and hoping to make Verner a viable candidate in future elections, Conservative leader Stephen Harper took the unusual step of naming Verner to the opposition shadow cabinet even though she was not a Member of Parliament. She served as critic for the Minister of the Economic Development Agency of Canada for the Regions of Quebec and the Minister responsible for La Francophonie, both posts then held by fellow Quebecker Jacques Saada. She was also appointed chair of the Quebec Conservative caucus which at the time was made up of herself and Conservative senators.

== Cabinet ==
Running again in the 2006 election, she was elected with 57.68% of the vote in Louis-Saint-Laurent, defeating Bernard Cleary, and heading a wave of Conservative victories that swept the Quebec City area.

On February 6, 2006, she was sworn into Prime Minister Stephen Harper's cabinet as Minister of International Co-operation and Minister for La Francophonie and the Official Languages Act.

Her parliamentary secretary was Ted Menzies, who received some criticism for having La Francophonie as his portfolio while he does not speak French. It was subsequently specified that he was appointed parliamentary secretary to Josée Verner for his experience as opposition critic for International Co-operation rather than for La Francophonie.

== Senate ==
After losing her seat in the House of Commons in the 2011 election, Verner was appointed by Prime Minister Stephen Harper to the Canadian Senate on May 18, 2011. On January 31, 2017, Verner announced that she would be resigning from the Conservative caucus to sit as a non-affiliated senator.

In May 2017, there was speculation that Verner may be selected as the CAQ candidate for a by-election in the Quebec City electoral district of Louis-Hébert. Although Verner did not run, she did endorse CAQ candidate Geneviève Guilbault for the seat.

Verner joined the Independent Senators Group caucus in October 2017. On November 4, 2019, she joined the Canadian Senators Group. At the same time, the CSG selected Senator Verner as its interim deputy leader.

In January 2021, The Globe and Mail reported that Verner was vacationing in Florida contrary to public health advice to avoid non-essential international travel during the COVID-19 pandemic in Canada.

28th Canadian Ministry (2006–2015) – Cabinet of Stephen Harper
Cabinet posts (4)
| Predecessor | Office | Successor |
|---|---|---|
| Rona Ambrose | President of the Queen's Privy Council for Canada; 2008–2011 | Peter Penashue |
| Rona Ambrose | Minister of Intergovernmental Affairs (Canada); 2008–2011 | Peter Penashue |
| Bev Oda | Minister of Canadian Heritage and Status of Women; 2007–2008 | James Moore |
| Aileen Carroll | Minister for International Cooperation; 2006–2007 | Bev Oda |
Special Cabinet Responsibilities
| Predecessor | Title | Successor |
| Jacques Saada | Ministerresponsible for La Francophonie; 2006–2007 | Maxime Bernier |
| Mauril Bélanger | Minister responsible for Official Languages; 2006–2008 | James Moore |
| Maxime Bernier | Minister responsible for La Francophonie; 2008–2011 | Bernard Valcourt |
