= Joseph-Rosaire Thibaudeau =

Canadian politician

The Hon. Joseph-Rosaire Thibaudeau
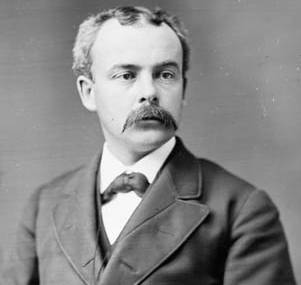

Senator for Rigaud, Quebec
- In office 1878–1909
- Appointed by: Alexander Mackenzie
- Preceded by: Charles Wilson
- Succeeded by: Arthur Boyer

Personal details
- Born: October 1, 1837 Cap-Santé, Lower Canada
- Died: June 16, 1909 (aged 71)
- Party: Liberal
- Relations: Isidore Thibaudeau, brother Alfred Thibaudeau, nephew

Joseph-Rosaire Thibaudeau (October 1, 1837 – June 16, 1909) was a Quebec businessman and political figure. He was a Liberal member of the Senate of Canada for Rigaud division from 1878 to 1909.

He was born at Cap-Santé, Lower Canada in 1837. Thibaudeau operated the Montreal branch of his older brother Isidore's company until 1895. In 1890, he was named sheriff for the city of Montreal. He was also president of the electric company and vice-president of the telephone company.

Thibaudeau was a member of the first Board of directors, Bell Telephone Company of Canada (Bell Canada) in 1880, the Ontario and Quebec Railway in July 1881, and Northern Electric and Manufacturing Company Limited (Nortel).

His nephew Alfred Thibaudeau also served in the Canadian senate.

== Family ==
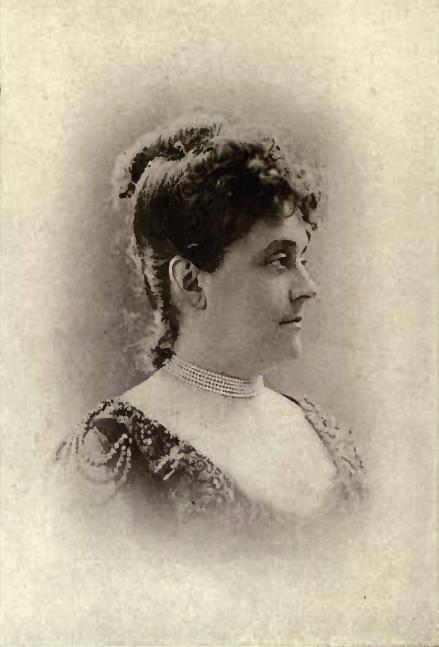
Madame Marguerite Thibaudeau by William James Topley

Joseph Rosaire Thibaudeau married December 9, 1873, Marguerite La Mothe, daughter of Guillaume La Mothe, former Postmaster of Montreal, and his wife, Marguerite de Savoye. Marguerite Thibaudeau was born at Montreal, Quebec March 6, 1853 and educated in Montreal. She served as the President of the Notre Dame Hospital and was instrumental in raising over $50,000 for the institution. She volunteered with the National Council of Women, the Women's Historical Society, the Parks and Playgrounds Association of Montreal. She was a founder of the Ladies' Branch of the Numismatic and Antiquarian Society. The couple lived at 837 Lagauchettire Street, Montreal. The couple had two daughters, the eldest of whom is married to Aime, son of Hon. C. A. Geoffrion, K.C., P.C. Miss Juliette La Mothe, a sister of Madame Thibaudeau, was married, in January, 1888, to the Marquis Charles de Bouthillier-Chavigny.
