= Alexandrine Latendresse =

Canadian politician (born 1984)

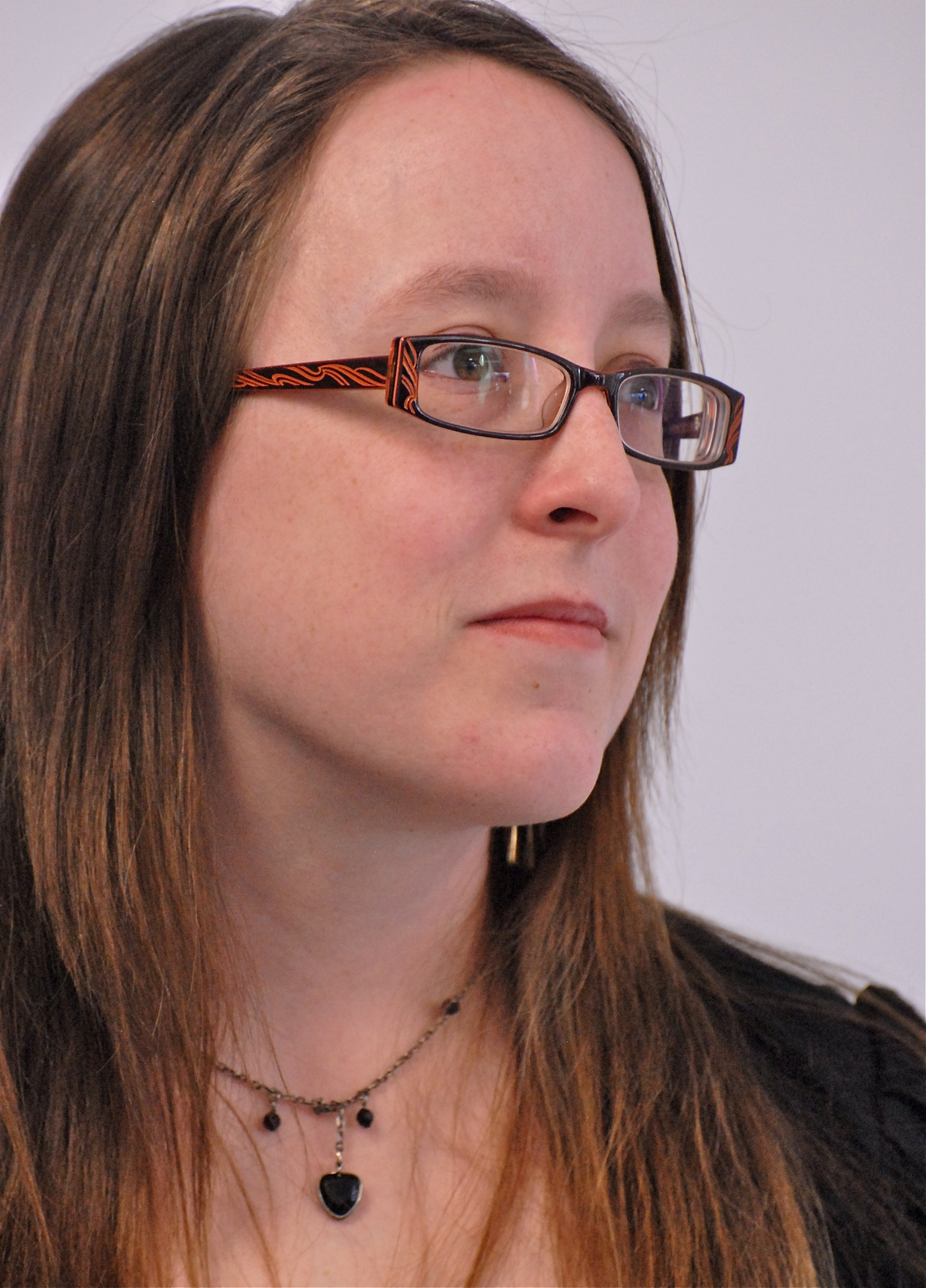

Member of Parliament for Louis-Saint-Laurent
- In office May 2, 2011 – October 19, 2015
- Preceded by: Josée Verner
- Succeeded by: Gérard Deltell

Personal details
- Born: April 30, 1984 (age 42) Montreal, Quebec
- Party: New Democratic Party

Alexandrine Latendresse (born April 30, 1984) was the New Democratic Party Member of Parliament for Louis-Saint-Laurent from 2011 to 2015.

== Early life and education ==
Latendresse was born in Montreal and had a career as a child actor, starring in advertisements in the 1980s that promoted cheese in Quebec. She then had roles in various television series, including Watatatow and Virginie. She also participated in films, including Montréal vu par..., La fête des rois, Soho, Aline and Anna's Garden (Le Jardin d'Anna).

She completed a Bachelor of Arts in linguistics at Université Laval one week before the 2011 election. She was to undertake graduate studies in May 2011, but she agreed to postpone this decision until after the election.

== Politics ==
Latendresse was the NDP candidate in the electoral district of Louis-Saint-Laurent in the 2008 federal election, but lost.

Alexandrine Latendresse when her election was announced on election night, 2 May 2011, at the NDP gathering in Québec.

She ran again as the NDP candidate in the same district in the 2011 Canadian federal election and was elected. She defeated former Minister of Intergovernmental Affairs Josée Verner of the Conservative Party.

In June 2011, leader Jack Layton named Latendresse to a frontbench position in the NDP caucus, as deputy critic for democratic reform. She served in this capacity for the entirety of the 41st Canadian Parliament.

Latendresse introduced Bill C-419, which would require future officers of Parliament to be able to function in both official languages without the help of an interpreter.

Latendresse declined to run again in the 2015 election, saying the pace of parliamentary debate had lost its appeal for her. Daniel Caron, a former ambassador of Canada to Ukraine from 2008 to 2011, was acclaimed as the NDP candidate in the district shortly thereafter.
