= Adolphe Guillet dit Tourangeau =

Canadian politician

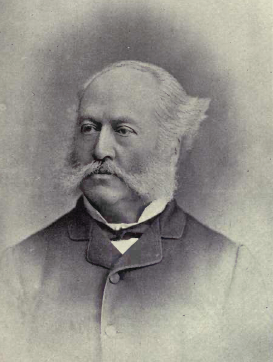

Member of the Canadian Parliament for Quebec East
- In office 1870–1874
- Preceded by: Pierre-Gabriel Huot
- Succeeded by: Isidore Thibaudeau

Mayor of Quebec City
- In office 1864–1865
- Preceded by: Thomas Pope
- Succeeded by: Joseph-Édouard Cauchon
- In office 1870–1870
- Preceded by: William Hossak
- Succeeded by: Pierre Garneau

Personal details
- Born: January 15, 1831 Quebec City, Lower Canada
- Died: October 8, 1894 (aged 63) Quebec City, Quebec
- Party: Conservative

Adolphe-Elzéar Guillet dit Tourangeau (January 15, 1831 – October 8, 1894) was a notary and political figure in Quebec, Canada. He was a Conservative member of the House of Commons of Canada representing Quebec East from 1870 to 1874. He also served two terms as mayor of Quebec City.

== Biography ==
He was born in Quebec City, Lower Canada in 1831 and studied at the Petit Séminaire de Québec. He articled as a notary, studied law at Université Laval and qualified as a notary in 1855. He set up practice in Quebec City, also serving as an agent for several insurance companies. He was a director for the North Shore Railway and the Quebec and Gosford Railway, later the Quebec and Lake St. John Railway. In 1863, he was elected to city council and he served as mayor from 1863 to 1866. During his time as mayor, a regular ferry service was established between Quebec City and Lévis. Tourangeau attempted to have the walls separating Quebec City's Upper Town and Lower Town demolished, although his efforts failed. He served another term as mayor in 1870; after the end of his term, Tourangeau and several of his fellow councillors continued to occupy city hall, claiming that the election was invalid. They were eventually forced to surrender after supplies were cut off.

He was elected to the House of Commons in an 1870 by-election, after Pierre-Gabriel Huot resigned his seat. He was reelected in 1872 but did not run in 1874. He ran unsuccessfully in an 1877 by-election against Wilfrid Laurier. He returned to his notary practice. He was named postmaster for Quebec in 1883 and served until his death in 1894.

By-election on 18 July 1870 Huot was appointed Postmaster of Quebec, May 1870
Party	Candidate	Votes
Conservative	Adolphe Guillet dit Tourangeau	1,092
Unknown	P.A. Valin	915

1872 Canadian federal election: Quebec East/Québec-Est
Party	Candidate	Votes
Conservative	Adolphe Guillet dit Tourangeau	acclaimed
Source: Canadian Elections Database
