= Pascal-Pierre Paillé =

Canadian politician (born 1978)

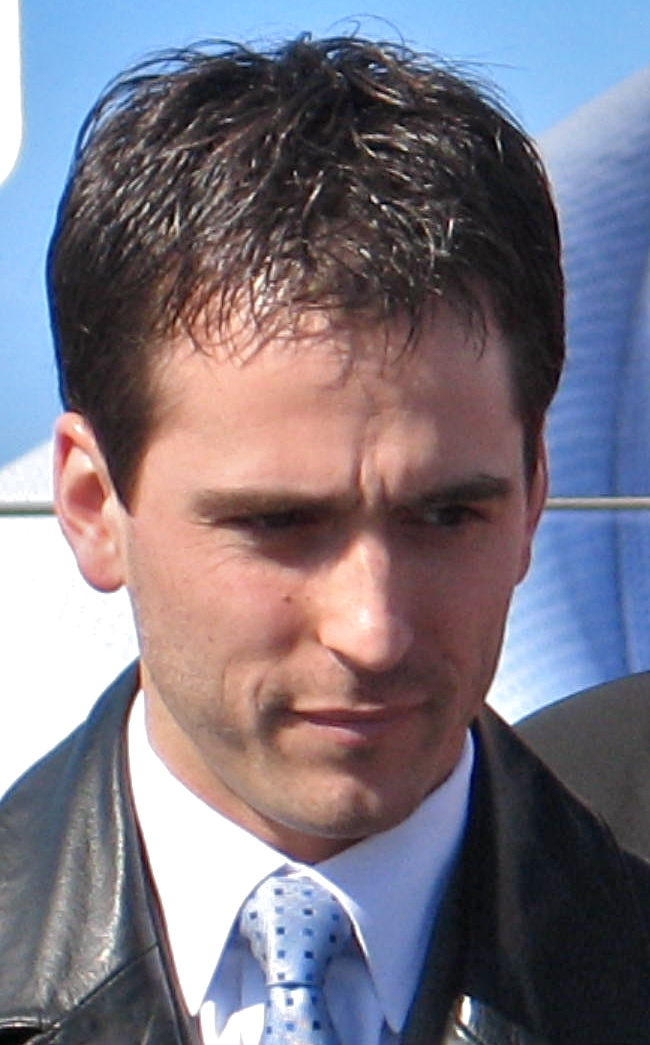

Member of Parliament for Louis-Hébert
- In office October 14, 2008 – May 2, 2011
- Preceded by: Luc Harvey
- Succeeded by: Denis Blanchette

Personal details
- Born: May 30, 1978 (age 48) Sherbrooke, Quebec, Canada
- Party: Bloc Québécois
- Profession: Politician; teacher

Pascal-Pierre Paillé (born May 30, 1978) is a Canadian former politician. As a member of the Bloc Québécois, he served as member of Parliament (MP) for the electoral district of Louis-Hébert from 2008 until his defeat in 2011.

Born in Sherbrooke, Quebec, Paillé is the nephew of Daniel Paillé, former leader of the Bloc Québécois and former Parti Québécois MNA in the National Assembly of Quebec who was elected as the MP for Hochelaga in a 2009 by-election.

Paillé was defeated in the 2011 federal election. He returned to teaching, working for the Centre de services scolaire de la Capitale in Quebec City. In March 2026, he was charged with allegedly committing sexual offences against two minors, with the allegations being from 2006 and 2024.
