= Hélène Scherrer =

Canadian politician (born 1950)

The Honourable Hélène Scherrer PC

Minister of Canadian Heritage
- In office 12 December 2003 – 19 July 2004
- Prime Minister: Paul Martin
- Preceded by: Sheila Copps
- Succeeded by: Liza Frulla

Personal details
- Born: 6 July 1950 (age 76) Quebec City, Quebec
- Party: Liberal

Hélène Chalifour-Scherrer, PC (born July 6, 1950) is a Canadian politician.

Scherrer was born in Quebec City, Quebec. From 2000 to 2004, she was a Member of Parliament in the House of Commons representing riding of Louis-Hébert, Quebec, as a member of the Liberal Party of Canada.

She has a Bachelor of Arts degree in social work. She has two children.

In December 2003, she was appointed Minister of Canadian Heritage by the new prime minister, Paul Martin. In the 2004 election, she was defeated by Roger Clavet of the Bloc Québécois, and replaced as heritage minister by Liza Frulla a month later.

On August 18, 2004, it was announced that she was to become Paul Martin's principal secretary, replacing Francis Fox. She held this post until the defeat of the Martin government in 2006. She ran again in that election, this time placing third behind Clavet and winner Luc Harvey.

Parliament of Canada
Preceded by Hélène Alarie	Member of Parliament for Louis-Hébert; 2000–2004	Succeeded by Roger Clavet
27th Canadian Ministry (2003–2006) – Cabinet of Paul Martin
Cabinet post (1)
Predecessor	Office	Successor
Sheila Copps	Minister of Canadian Heritage; 2003–2004	Liza Frulla
