= Louis-Saint-Laurent—Akiawenhrahk =

Federal electoral district in Quebec, Canada

Quebec electoral district
- Interactive map of riding boundaries from the 2025 federal election

Federal electoral district
- Legislature: House of Commons
MP
Gérard Deltell
Conservative
- District created: 2003
- First contested: 2004
- Last contested: 2025
- District webpage: profile, map

Demographics
- Population (2016): 117,238
- Electors (2019): 94,734
- Area (km²): 141
- Pop. density (per km²): 831.5
- Census division: Quebec City
- Census subdivision(s): Quebec City (part), L'Ancienne-Lorette, Wendake

Louis-Saint-Laurent—Akiawenhrahk (formerly Louis-Saint-Laurent) is a federal electoral district in Quebec, Canada, which has been represented in the House of Commons since 2004. It is one of five federal electoral districts in Quebec City. Since 2015, its Member of Parliament (MP) has been Gérard Deltell of the Conservative Party.

It was created in 2003 from parts of the Portneuf and Quebec East former districts.

== Geography ==
The riding, in the Quebec region of Capitale-Nationale, consists of the northwestern part of Quebec City, including parts of the boroughs of Laurentien, Les Rivières, and La Haute-Saint-Charles, along with the Wendake Indian reserve and the city of L'Ancienne-Lorette.

The neighbouring ridings are Portneuf—Jacques-Cartier, Charlesbourg—Haute-Saint-Charles, Québec, and Louis-Hébert.

The riding lost a small fraction of territory to Charlesbourg—Haute-Saint-Charles and gained a small fraction from Louis-Hébert during the 2012 electoral redistribution.

Following the 2022 federal electoral redistribution the riding lost territory to Charlesbourg—Haute-Saint-Charles east of the following line: Boul. Val-Cartier to Rue de la Rivière-Nelson, Rivière Saint-Charles, the eastern limits of the Wendake Indian Reserve, Boul. Bastien and Boul. Pierre-Bertrand.

== Demographics ==
According to the 2011 Canadian census

Ethnic groups: 94.9% White, 3.0% Indigenous, 0.6% Black, 1.5% other
Languages: 96.8% French, 1.3% English, 1.9% other
Religions: 88.9% Christian, 0.5% Muslim, 0.4% other, 10.2% none
Median income: $35,225 (2010)
Average income: $39,793 (2010)

== History ==
The riding is named after former prime minister Louis St. Laurent, and is mostly a reconfigured version of his old riding of Quebec East; ironically, it has not been represented by an MP from his Liberal Party at any point since its creation. In the 2004 federal election, Bernard Cleary defeated Conservative candidate Josée Verner by some 3,000 votes. Verner's win in the 2006 election, was part of a Conservative breakthrough in Quebec that helped the party win government for the first time. After five years, Verner was swept out by the NDP's Alexandrine Latendresse as part of the NDP's sweep of Quebec City.

Following the 2022 electoral redistribution, the riding shrank to the south to cede a portion of territory to the Charlesbourg—Haute-Saint-Charles riding. When the final report was adopted on June 16, 2023, Louis-Saint-Laurent changed its name to Louis-Saint-Laurent—Akiawenhrahk. The name initially proposed by the commission was Louis-Saint-Laurent—Wendake since the reserve of the same name is located on the territory, but the Grand Chief of the Huron-Wendatt Nation of Wendake, Rémy Vincent, instead proposed Akiawenhrahk, which means "trout" in Wendat, but is also the name for the Saint-Charles River which runs along the western boundary of the reserve.

=== Members of Parliament ===
This riding has elected the following members of Parliament:

Parliament	Years	Member	Party
Louis-Saint-Laurent; Riding created from Portneuf and Quebec East
38th	2004–2006	Bernard Cleary	Bloc Québécois
39th	2006–2008	Josée Verner	Conservative
40th	2008–2011	Josée Verner	Conservative
41st	2011–2015	Alexandrine Latendresse	New Democratic
42nd	2015–2019	Gérard Deltell	Conservative
43rd	2019–2021	Gérard Deltell	Conservative
44th	2021–2025	Gérard Deltell	Conservative
Louis-Saint-Laurent—Akiawenhrahk
45th	2025–present	Gérard Deltell	Conservative

== Election results ==
=== Louis-Saint-Laurent—Akiawenhrahk ===
2025 Canadian federal election
Party	Candidate	Votes	%	±%	Expenditures
Conservative	Gérard Deltell	29,525	44.86	-7.17	
Liberal	Rhode-Malaure Pierre	21,693	32.96	+15.62	
Bloc Québécois	Martin Trudel	12,465	18.94	-1.19	
New Democratic	Colette Ducharme	1,607	2.44	-2.84	
People's	Anthony Leclerc	527	0.80	-1.33	
Total valid votes/expense limit		65,817	98.61		
Total rejected ballots		928	1.39		
Turnout		66,745	72.80		
Eligible voters		91,687			
Conservative notional hold		Swing		-11.40	
Source: Elections Canada
Note: number of eligible voters does not include voting day registrations.

2021 federal election redistributed results
Party	Vote	%
Conservative	30,443	52.03
Bloc Québécois	11,778	20.13
Liberal	10,145	17.34
New Democratic	3,087	5.28
People's	1,244	2.13
Green	833	1.42
Others	985	1.68

=== Louis-Saint-Laurent ===
2021 Canadian federal election: Louis-Saint-Laurent
Party	Candidate	Votes	%	±%	Expenditures
Conservative	Gérard Deltell	33,098	51.64	+6.98	$58,431.61
Bloc Québécois	Thierry Bilodeau	13,609	20.39	-1.99	$5,282.09
Liberal	Nathanielle Morin	11,228	17.52	-3.18	$13,078.75
New Democratic	Yu-Ti Eva Huang	3,370	5.26	-1.36	$305.95
People's	Guillaume Côté	1,337	2.09	-0.27	$100.00
Free	Mélanie Fortin	1,089	1.70	–	$416.51
Green	Daniel Chicoine	907	1.42	-1.87	$661.11
Total valid votes/expense limit		64,098	–	–	$123,881.08
Total rejected ballots					
Turnout			66.52	-4.06	
Registered voters		96,352			
Conservative hold		Swing		+4.49	
Source: Elections Canada

2019 Canadian federal election: Louis-Saint-Laurent
Party	Candidate	Votes	%	±%	Expenditures
Conservative	Gérard Deltell	29,279	44.66	-5.80	$47,164.29
Bloc Québécois	Jeanne-Paule Desgagnés	14,674	22.38	+12.04	$1,905.18
Liberal	Jean-Christophe Cusson	13,571	20.70	-0.72	none listed
New Democratic	Colette Amram Ducharme	4,339	6.62	-9.30	$1,469.48
Green	Sandra Mara Riedo	2,155	3.29	+1.42	$2,280.42
People's	Guillaume Côté	1,543	2.35		none listed
Total valid votes/expense limit		65,561	97.93		
Total rejected ballots		1,389	2.07		
Turnout		66,950	70.58		
Eligible voters		94,851			
Conservative hold		Swing		-17.82	
Source: Elections Canada

2015 Canadian federal election: Louis-Saint-Laurent
Party	Candidate	Votes	%	±%	Expenditures
Conservative	Gérard Deltell	32,637	50.46	+12.58	$74,381.15
Liberal	Youri Rousseau	13,852	21.42	+15.05	$26,310.43
New Democratic	G. Daniel Caron	10,296	15.92	-23.96	$48,765.46
Bloc Québécois	Ronald Sirard	6,688	10.34	-4.02	$12,115.99
Green	Michel Savard	1,210	1.87	+0.37	–
Total valid votes/expense limit		64,683	100.0		$234,522.60
Total rejected ballots		852	–	–	
Turnout		65,535	–	–	
Eligible voters		91,332			
Conservative gain from New Democratic		Swing		+18.27	
Source: Elections Canada

2011 federal election redistributed results
Party	Vote	%
New Democratic	22,576	39.88
Conservative	21,278	37.58
Bloc Québécois	8,128	14.36
Liberal	3,606	6.37
Green	852	1.50
Others	175	0.31

2011 Canadian federal election
Party	Candidate	Votes	%	±%	Expenditures
New Democratic	Alexandrine Latendresse	22,629	39.87	+29.42	
Conservative	Josée Verner	21,334	37.59	-9.55	
Bloc Québécois	France Gagné	8,148	14.36	-12.17	
Liberal	Philippe Mérel	3,612	6.36	-7.00	
Green	Jean Cloutier	857	1.51	-1.00	
Christian Heritage	Daniel Arseneault	175	0.31	–	
Total valid votes/expense limit		56,755	100.00		
Total rejected ballots		800	1.39		
Turnout		57,555	66.35		

2008 Canadian federal election
Party	Candidate	Votes	%	±%	Expenditures
Conservative	Josée Verner	23,683	47.14	-10.54	$75,380
Bloc Québécois	France Gagné	13,330	26.53	+2.34	$40,886
Liberal	Hélène H. Leone	6,712	13.36	+6.95	$14,160
New Democratic	Alexandrine Latendresse	5,252	10.45	+4.71	$1,021
Green	Jean Cloutier	1,260	2.51	-0.45	$253
Total valid votes/expense limit		50,237	100.00	$85,998	
Total rejected ballots		729	1.43		
Turnout		50,966	62.88		

2006 Canadian federal election
Party	Candidate	Votes	%	±%	Expenditures
Conservative	Josée Verner	28,606	57.68	+26.55	$76,425
Bloc Québécois	Bernard Cleary	11,997	24.19	-14.25	$36,060
Liberal	Isa Gros-Louis	3,180	6.41	-15.93	$46,551
New Democratic	Robert Donnelly	2,848	5.74	+2.69	$3,702
Independent	Christian Légaré	1,498	3.02	–	$28,956
Green	Lucien Gravelle	1,468	2.96	+0.19	$112
Total valid votes/expense limit		49,597	100.00	$79,200	
Total rejected ballots		467	0.93		
Turnout		50,064	64.01		
Conservative gain from Bloc Québécois		Swing		-10.7	

2004 Canadian federal election
Party	Candidate	Votes	%	±%	Expenditures
Bloc Québécois	Bernard Cleary	17,248	38.44	+1.4	$29,253
Conservative	Josée Verner	13,967	31.13	+7.6	$66,667
Liberal	Michel Fragasso	10,025	22.34	-15.6	$66,345
New Democratic	Christopher Bojanowski	1,369	3.05	+1.3	$271
Green	Yonnel Bonaventure	1,243	2.77	–	
Independent	Jean-Guy Carignan	563	1.25	–	$20,647
Independent	Henri Gauvin	332	0.74	–	
Communist	Dominique Théberge	119	0.27	–	$889
Total valid votes/expense limit		45,851	100.00	$77,479	
Total rejected ballots		985	2.15		
Turnout		45,851	59.39		
Bloc Québécois gain from Liberal		Swing		-3.1	

Change from 2000 is based on redistributed results. Conservative Party change is based on the total of Canadian Alliance and Progressive Conservative Party votes.

== See also ==
- List of Canadian electoral districts
- Historical federal electoral districts of Canada
