= Jean-Paul Marchand =

Canadian politician

Member of Parliament for Quebec East
- In office 1993–2000
- Preceded by: Marcel Tremblay
- Succeeded by: Jean-Guy Carignan

Personal details
- Born: 13 September 1944 (age 81) Penetanguishene, Ontario, Canada
- Party: Bloc Québécois
- Profession: professor, author

Jean-Paul Marchand (born 13 September 1944) was a member of the House of Commons of Canada from 1993 to 2000. He is a professor and author by career.

Born in Penetanguishene, Ontario, Marchand taught philosophy at the University of Manitoba, the University of Ottawa and Université Laval.

He was elected in the Quebec East electoral district under the Bloc Québécois party in the 1993 and 1997 federal elections, thus serving in the 35th and 36th Canadian Parliaments. He was defeated in the 2000 federal election and thus left Canadian politics.

== Works ==
- Conspiration? : les anglophones veulent-ils éliminer le français du Canada?. Stanké. April 1997. ISBN 978-2-7604-0576-9.
- Marchand, Jean-Paul (1989). Maudits Anglais. Lettre ouverte aux Québécois d'un Franco-Ontarien indigné. Stanké. ISBN 2-7604-0350-5.
