= Suzanne Duplessis =

Canadian politician

The Honourable Suzanne Fortin-Duplessis

Member of Parliament for Louis-Hébert
- In office 1984–1993
- Preceded by: Dennis Dawson
- Succeeded by: Philippe Paré

Senator from Quebec (Rougemont)
- In office 14 January 2009 – 30 June 2015
- Preceded by: Michael Fortier
- Succeeded by: Marie-Françoise Mégie

Personal details
- Born: 30 June 1940 (age 86) Chicoutimi, Quebec
- Party: Progressive Conservative → Conservative
- Spouse: Maurice Duplessis

Suzanne Fortin-Duplessis (born 30 June 1940) is a Canadian retired Senator and former Progressive Conservative member of the House of Commons of Canada. She was a teacher by profession.

== Early life ==
She studied at the École des Beaux-Arts in Quebec City followed by studies at Université Laval where she received a Bachelor of Arts degree for visual arts with an educational psychology certificate. Fortin-Duplessis became a teacher after this.

== Member of Parliament ==
She was the first female elected municipal councillor in Sainte-Foy, Quebec in 1981.

Fortin-Duplessis represented the Quebec riding of Louis-Hébert where she was first elected in the 1984 federal election and re-elected in 1988, becoming part of Brian Mulroney's governing party during the 33rd and 34th Canadian Parliaments.

Fortin-Duplessis left federal politics after her defeat in the 1993 federal election by Philippe Paré of the Bloc Québécois.

== Return to politics ==
Both Fortin-Duplessis and former colleague Pierre H. Vincent managed the Conservative campaign in Quebec in the federal election of 2008.

Prime Minister Stephen Harper appointed Fortin-Duplessis to the Senate on 22 December 2008. She retired on 30 June 2015 upon reaching the mandatory retirement age of 75.
