= Philippe Paré =

Canadian politician

Member of Parliament for Louis-Hébert
- In office 25 October 1993 – 1 June 1997
- Preceded by: Suzanne Duplessis
- Succeeded by: Hélène Alarie

Personal details
- Born: 24 August 1935 (age 90) Montmagny, Quebec
- Party: Bloc Québécois
- Profession: educator

Philippe Paré (born 24 August 1935) is a former member of the House of Commons of Canada, in which he served from 1993 to 1997. His career has been in education.

Born in Montmagny, Quebec, he was elected in the Louis-Hébert electoral district under the Bloc Québécois party in the 1993 federal election, thus he served in the 35th Canadian Parliament. He did not seek a second term in office and therefore left Canadian politics following the 1997 federal election.
