= Hélène Alarie =

Canadian politician (1941–2023)

Member of the Canadian Parliament for Louis-Hébert
- In office June 2, 1997 – November 26, 2000
- Preceded by: Philippe Paré
- Succeeded by: Hélène Scherrer

Personal details
- Born: 6 June 1941 Sainte-Anne-de-la-Pocatière, Quebec, Canada
- Died: 26 October 2023 (aged 82) Lévis, Quebec, Canada
- Party: Bloc Québécois
- Occupation: Agronomist

Hélène Alarie (French pronunciation: [elɛn alaʁi]; June 6, 1941 – October 26, 2023) was a Canadian politician who was a member of the House of Commons from 1997 to 2000. By career, she had work in teaching, government and agriculture.

Born in Sainte-Anne-de-la-Pocatière, Quebec, she was elected in the Louis-Hébert electoral district under the Bloc Québécois party in the 1997 federal election, serving in the 36th Canadian Parliament. During her term of office she participated in parliamentary committees relating to agriculture. She was defeated in the 2000 federal election by Liberal candidate Hélène Scherrer. Alarie died in 2023 in Lévis, Quebec, at the age of 82.

== Electoral record ==
2000 Canadian federal election
Party	Candidate	Votes	%	±%
Liberal	Hélène Scherrer	23,695	41.14	+7.52
Bloc Québécois	Hélène Alarie	21,240	36.88	-2.97
Alliance	Léonce-E. Roy	5,887	10.22	+8.50
Progressive Conservative	Clermont Gauthier	5,189	9.01	-12.90
New Democratic	Karl Adomeit	1,200	2.08	+0.13
Marxist–Leninist	Gisèle Desrochers	382	0.66	
Total valid votes		57,593	100.00	
Liberal gain from Bloc Québécois		Swing		+5.25

Note: Canadian Alliance vote is compared to the Reform vote in 1997 election.

1997 Canadian federal election
Party	Candidate	Votes	%	±%
Bloc Québécois	Hélène Alarie	23,653	39.85	-15.78
Liberal	Hélène Scherrer	19,955	33.62	+7.86
Progressive Conservative	Christian Lessard	13,002	21.91	+6.62
New Democratic	Karl Adomeit	1,161	1.96	+0.60
Reform	Gilles St-Laurent	1,024	1.73	
Natural Law	Réal Croteau	558	0.94	-0.51
Total valid votes		59,353	100.00	
Bloc Québécois hold		Swing		+11.82
