= Joël Lightbound =

Canadian politician (born 1988)

The Honourable Joël Lightbound PC MP
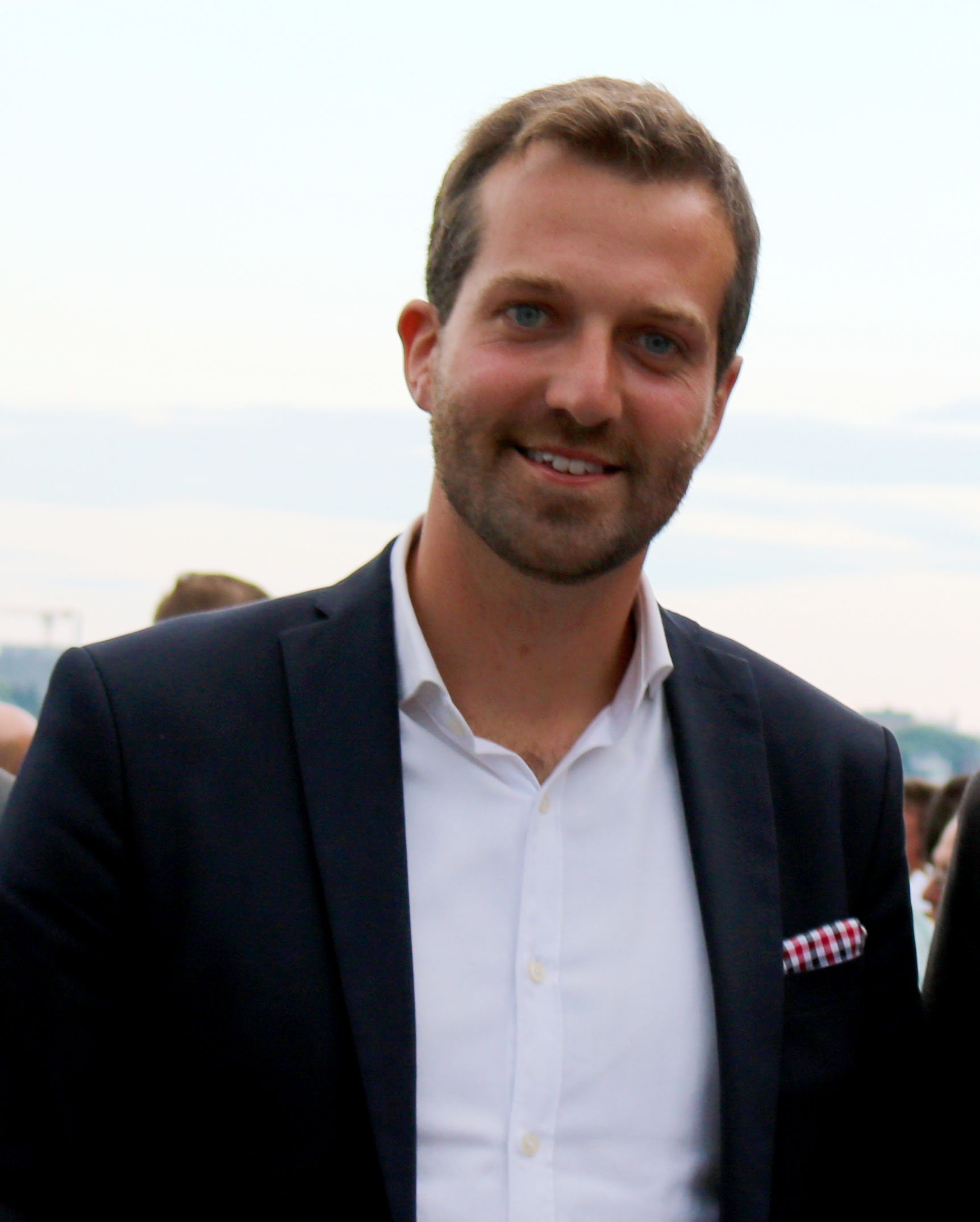
- Lightbound in 2015

Minister of Government Transformation, Public Services and Procurement Receiver General for Canada
- Incumbent
- Assumed office May 13, 2025
- Prime Minister: Mark Carney
- Preceded by: Ali Ehsassi
Junior ministerial roles
Parliamentary Secretary to the Minister of Public Safety and Emergency Preparedness
In office December 12, 2019 – October 26, 2021
Minister	Bill Blair
Preceded by	Bill Blair (as Minister of Border Security)
Succeeded by	Pam Damoff (Parliamentary Secretary for Public Safety)
Parliamentary Secretary to the Minister of Finance
In office September 19, 2017 – December 12, 2019
Minister	Bill Morneau
Preceded by	Ginette Petitpas Taylor
Succeeded by	Sean Fraser (as Secretary to the Minister of Finance and to the Minister of Middle Class Prosperity)
Parliamentary Secretary to the Minister of Health
In office January 30, 2017 – September 19, 2017
Minister	Jane Philpott; Ginette Petitpas Taylor
Preceded by	Kamal Khera
Succeeded by	Bill Blair

Member of Parliament for Louis-Hébert
- Incumbent
- Assumed office October 19, 2015
- Preceded by: Denis Blanchette

Personal details
- Born: February 8, 1988 (age 38) Toronto, Ontario, Canada
- Party: Liberal
- Education: McGill University

Joël Lightbound (born February 8, 1988) is a Canadian politician who has served as the minister of government transformation, public services and procurement since May 2025 and the government's Quebec lieutenant since December 2025. A member of the Liberal Party, he was first elected following the 2015 federal election and is the member of Parliament (MP) for Louis-Hébert.

== Background ==
In 2008, Lightbound was awarded the Cardinal Roy Trophy from Champlain Regional College. He later attended the McGill University Faculty of Law, where he won the National Laskin Moot. He initially articled with the Montreal offices of Fasken, and prior to his election practiced law in the Quebec City area, specializing in immigration.

== Political career ==
Lightbound was elected in 2015. He was re-elected in 2019, becoming the first MP in three decades to hold Louis-Hébert for more than one term, and again in 2021.

In February 2022, during the COVID-19 pandemic and Freedom Convoy protests, Lightbound held a press conference where he spoke out against politicians' handling of the pandemic, and denounced dismissing those with "legitimate concerns" while also calling for the convoy protesters to return home. Soon afterwards, Lightbound resigned his position in the party as Quebec caucus chair.

In 2022, Lightbound was the sole Liberal MP to vote for a Bloc Québécois-sponsored resolution calling for the Monarchy of Canada to be abolished.

On April 28, 2025, Lightbound was re-elected again from Louis-Hébert, with 55.4% of the vote. On May 13, 2025, he was appointed to Prime Minister Mark Carney's Cabinet as Minister of Government Transformation, Public Services and Procurement. In this capacity, Lightbound announced in September 2025 that the federal government would allow Canada Post to phase out door-to-door service in favour of community mailboxes, impacting roughly 4,000,000 addresses. It will also close many rural post offices. He was appointed Quebec lieutenant in December 2025.

== Electoral record ==
2025 Canadian federal election: Louis-Hébert
Party	Candidate	Votes	%	±%	Expenditures
Liberal	Joël Lightbound	33,512	55.44	+17.23	$46,379.06
Bloc Québécois	Valérie Savard	12,897	21.34	–5.66	$40,176.74
Conservative	Claude Dussault	12,164	20.12	–4.19	$34,464.89
New Democratic	Jean-Paul Lussiaà-Berdou	1,540	2.55	–4.68	$444.00
People's	Vatthana Maholy	332	0.55	N/A	$0.00
Total valid votes/expense limit		60,445	98.81	–	$126,772.11
Total rejected ballots		729	1.19		
Turnout		61,174	76.95		
Eligible voters		79,502			
Liberal notional hold		Swing		+11.45	
Source: Elections Canada
Note: number of eligible voters does not include voting day registrations.

2021 Canadian federal election: Louis-Hébert
Party	Candidate	Votes	%	±%	Expenditures
Liberal	Joël Lightbound	22,933	38.35	-2.16	$51,233.94
Bloc Québécois	Marc Dean	16,247	27.17	-0.83	$22,437.53
Conservative	Gilles Lépine	14,332	23.97	+6.39	$21,615.85
New Democratic	Hamid Nadji	4,337	7.25	-0.62	$5,611.33
Green	Denis Blanchette	1,573	2.63	-1.34	$2,847.44
Independent	Ali Dahan	378	0.63	+0.20	$0.00
Total valid votes/expense limit		59,800	–	–	$111,646.95
Total rejected ballots		861			
Turnout		60,661	74.31	-2.07	
Registered voters		81,632			
Liberal hold		Swing		-0.67	
Source: Elections Canada

2019 Canadian federal election: Louis-Hébert
Party	Candidate	Votes	%	±%	Expenditures
Liberal	Joël Lightbound	25,140	40.51	+5.66	$82,402.61
Bloc Québécois	Christian Hébert	17,375	28.00	+13.59	$49,988.85
Conservative	Marie-Josée Guérette	10,912	17.58	-9.61	$54,059.24
New Democratic	Jérémie Juneau	4,884	7.87	-12.94	none listed
Green	Macarena Diab	2,466	3.97	+1.44	none listed
People's	Daniel Brisson	1,016	1.64	–	none listed
Independent	Ali Dahan	267	0.43	–	$0.00
Total valid votes		62,060	98.61	–	
Total rejected ballots		873	1.39	–	
Turnout		62,933	76.38	–	
Eligible voters		82,395	–	–	
Liberal hold		Swing		-3.97	
Source: Elections Canada

2015 Canadian federal election: Louis-Hébert
Party	Candidate	Votes	%	±%	Expenditures
Liberal	Joël Lightbound	21,516	34.85	+21.43	–
Conservative	Jean-Pierre Asselin	16,789	27.19	+5.36	–
New Democratic	Denis Blanchette	12,850	20.81	-17.84	–
Bloc Québécois	Caroline Pageau	8,900	14.41	-9.80	–
Green	Andrée-Anne Beaudoin-Julien	1,561	2.53	+0.88	–
Christian Heritage	Stefan Jetchick	128	0.21	-0.03	–
Total valid votes/Expense limit		61,744	100.00		$217,520.39
Total rejected ballots		627	1.01	–	
Turnout		62,371	76.90	–	
Eligible voters		81,109			
Liberal gain from New Democratic		Swing		+19.63	
Source: Elections Canada

Order of precedence
Preceded by Tim Hodgson as Member of the Cabinet	Order of Precedence of Canada as Member of the Cabinet	Succeeded by Heath MacDonald as Member of the Cabinet
