= Quebec East =

Former federal electoral district in Quebec, Canada

Quebec electoral district

Defunct federal electoral district
- Legislature: House of Commons
- District created: 1867
- District abolished: 2003
- First contested: 1867
- Last contested: 2000

Quebec East (also known as Québec-Est and Québec East) was a federal electoral district in Quebec, Canada, that was represented in the House of Commons of Canada from 1867 to 2004.

While its boundaries changed over the decades, it was essentially made up of the eastern part of Quebec City and was largely of working class composition. It was created in 1867. It was renamed "Québec-Est" in 1966, and "Québec East" in 1996. It was abolished through redistribution 2003 into the ridings of Québec, Louis-Saint-Laurent, and Beauport.

From 1877 to 1958, the riding was represented by only three Members of Parliament (MPs): Prime Minister Sir Wilfrid Laurier (1877–1919), senior Cabinet member Ernest Lapointe (1919–1941) and Prime Minister Louis St. Laurent (1942–1958). With Laurier serving as prime minister from 1896 until 1911, and St. Laurent doing likewise from 1948 until 1957, Quebec East became one of two districts to be represented by two sitting prime ministers; the only other to date is Prince Albert.

== Members of Parliament ==
This riding has elected the following members of Parliament:

Parliament	Years	Member	Party
Quebec East
1st	1867–1870	Pierre Gabriel Huot	Liberal
1st	1870–1872	Adolphe Guillet dit Tourangeau	Conservative
2nd	1872–1874	Adolphe Guillet dit Tourangeau	Conservative
3rd	1874–1877	Isidore Thibaudeau	Liberal
3rd	1877–1878	Wilfrid Laurier	Liberal
4th	1878–1882	Wilfrid Laurier	Liberal
5th	1882–1887	Wilfrid Laurier	Liberal
6th	1887–1891	Wilfrid Laurier	Liberal
7th	1891–1896	Wilfrid Laurier	Liberal
8th	1896–1896	Wilfrid Laurier	Liberal
8th	1896–1900	Wilfrid Laurier	Liberal
9th	1900–1904	Wilfrid Laurier	Liberal
10th	1904–1908	Wilfrid Laurier	Liberal
11th	1908–1911	Wilfrid Laurier	Liberal
12th	1911–1917	Wilfrid Laurier	Liberal
13th	1917–1919	Wilfrid Laurier	Opposition (Laurier Liberals)
13th	1919–1921	Ernest Lapointe	Opposition (Laurier Liberals)
14th	1921–1922	Ernest Lapointe	Liberal
14th	1922–1925	Ernest Lapointe	Liberal
15th	1925–1926	Ernest Lapointe	Liberal
16th	1926–1926	Ernest Lapointe	Liberal
16th	1926–1930	Ernest Lapointe	Liberal
17th	1930–1935	Ernest Lapointe	Liberal
18th	1935–1940	Ernest Lapointe	Liberal
19th	1940–1941	Ernest Lapointe	Liberal
19th	1942–1945	Louis St. Laurent	Liberal
20th	1945–1949	Louis St. Laurent	Liberal
21st	1949–1953	Louis St. Laurent	Liberal
22nd	1953–1957	Louis St. Laurent	Liberal
23rd	1957–1958	Louis St. Laurent	Liberal
24th	1958–1962	Yvon Tassé	Progressive Conservative
25th	1962–1963	Jean Robert Beaulé	Social Credit
26th	1963–1963	Jean Robert Beaulé	Social Credit
26th	1963–1965	Jean Robert Beaulé	Ralliement créditiste
27th	1965–1968	Gérard Duquet	Liberal
Québec-Est
28th	1968–1972	Gérard Duquet	Liberal
29th	1972–1974	Gérard Duquet	Liberal
30th	1974–1979	Gérard Duquet	Liberal
31st	1979–1980	Gérard Duquet	Liberal
32nd	1980–1984	Gérard Duquet	Liberal
33rd	1984–1988	Marcel Tremblay	Progressive Conservative
34th	1988–1993	Marcel Tremblay	Progressive Conservative
35th	1993–1997	Jean-Paul Marchand	Bloc Québécois
Québec East
36th	1997–2000	Jean-Paul Marchand	Bloc Québécois
37th	2000–2001	Jean-Guy Carignan	Liberal
37th	2001–2003	Jean-Guy Carignan	Independent
37th	2003–2003	Jean-Guy Carignan	Liberal
37th	2003–2004	Jean-Guy Carignan	Independent
Riding dissolved into Québec, Louis-Saint-Laurent and Beauport

== Election results ==
=== Quebec East ===
1867 Canadian federal election
Party	Candidate	Votes
Liberal	Pierre Huot	acclaimed
Source: Canadian Elections Database

By-election on 18 July 1870 Huot was appointed Postmaster of Quebec, May 1870
Party	Candidate	Votes
Conservative (independent)	Adolphe Guillet dit Tourangeau	1,092
Conservative	Pierre-Vincent Valin	915

1872 Canadian federal election
Party	Candidate	Votes
Conservative	Adolphe Guillet dit Tourangeau	acclaimed
Source: Canadian Elections Database

1874 Canadian federal election
Party	Candidate	Votes
Liberal	Isidore Thibaudeau	acclaimed
Source: lop.parl.ca

Canadian federal by-election, November 11, 1877 Federal Ministerial by-election for Laurier's appointed as Minister of Inland Revenue and Isidore Thibaudeau resignation on November 7, 1877
Party	Candidate	Votes	%	Elected
Liberal	Wilfrid Laurier	1,863	54.62	✓
Conservative	Adolphe Guillet dit Tourangeau	1,548	45.38	
Total valid votes		3,411	100.00	
Source(s) "Quebec East, Quebec (1867-08-06 - 1968-04-22)". History of Federal Ridings Since 1867. Library of Parliament. Federal Ministerial by-election, November 11, 1877: Quebec East, Quebec on Wilfrid Laurier's appointment as Minister of Inland Revenue, October 8, 1877

1878 Canadian federal election
Party	Candidate	Votes	%	Elected
Liberal	Wilfrid Laurier	1,946	62.49	✓
Unknown	Phi. Vallières	1,168	37.51	
Total valid votes		3,114	100.00	
Source(s) "Quebec East, Quebec (1867-08-06 - 1968-04-22)". History of Federal Ridings Since 1867. Library of Parliament.

1882 Canadian federal election
Party	Candidate	Votes	%	Elected
Liberal	Wilfrid Laurier	1,750	57.70	✓
Conservative	Jacques-Philippe Rhéaume	1,283	42.30	
Total valid votes		3,033	100.00	
Source(s) "Quebec East, Quebec (1867-08-06 - 1968-04-22)". History of Federal Ridings Since 1867. Library of Parliament.

1887 Canadian federal election
Party	Candidate	Votes	%	Elected
Liberal	Wilfrid Laurier	2,622	79.05	✓
Conservative	F. X. Drouin	695	20.95	
Total valid votes		3,317	100.00	
Source(s) "Quebec East, Quebec (1867-08-06 - 1968-04-22)". History of Federal Ridings Since 1867. Library of Parliament.

1891 Canadian federal election
Party	Candidate	Votes	Elected
Liberal	Wilfrid Laurier	acclaimed	✓
Total valid votes		-	-
Source(s) "Quebec East, Quebec (1867-08-06 - 1968-04-22)". History of Federal Ridings Since 1867. Library of Parliament.

1896 Canadian federal election
Party	Candidate	Votes	%	Elected
Liberal	Wilfrid Laurier	3,202	76.00	✓
Conservative	Cléophas Leclerc	1,011	24.00	
Total valid votes		4,213	100.00	
Source(s) "Quebec East, Quebec (1867-08-06 - 1968-04-22)". History of Federal Ridings Since 1867. Library of Parliament.

Canadian federal by-election, July 30, 1896 Federal Ministerial by-election for Laurier's being made Prime Minister on July 11, 1896
Party	Candidate	Votes	Elected
Liberal	Wilfrid Laurier	acclaimed	✓
Total valid votes		-	-
Source(s) "Quebec East, Quebec (1867-08-06 - 1968-04-22)". History of Federal Ridings Since 1867. Library of Parliament.

1900 Canadian federal election
Party	Candidate	Votes	%	Elected
Liberal	Wilfrid Laurier	3,598	81.33	✓
Conservative	Joseph-Eugène Chapleau	826	18.67	
Total valid votes		4,424	100.00	
Source(s) "Quebec East, Quebec (1867-08-06 - 1968-04-22)". History of Federal Ridings Since 1867. Library of Parliament.

1904 Canadian federal election
Party	Candidate	Votes	%	Elected
Liberal	Wilfrid Laurier	3,524	71.35	✓
Conservative	Michel Fiset	1,415	28.65	
Total valid votes		4,939	100.00	
Source(s) "Quebec East, Quebec (1867-08-06 - 1968-04-22)". History of Federal Ridings Since 1867. Library of Parliament.

1908 Canadian federal election
Party	Candidate	Votes	%	Elected
Liberal	Wilfrid Laurier	3,764	70.83	✓
Conservative	Michel Fiset	1,550	29.17	
Total valid votes		5,314	100.00	
Source(s) "Quebec East, Quebec (1867-08-06 - 1968-04-22)". History of Federal Ridings Since 1867. Library of Parliament.

1911 Canadian federal election
Party	Candidate	Votes	Elected
Liberal	Wilfrid Laurier	acclaimed	✓
Total valid votes		-	-
Source(s) "Quebec East, Quebec (1867-08-06 - 1968-04-22)". History of Federal Ridings Since 1867. Library of Parliament.

1917 Canadian federal election
Party	Candidate	Votes	%	Elected
Opposition (Laurier Liberals)	Wilfrid Laurier	6,957	92.53	✓
Government (Unionist)	Ferdinand Omer Drouin	562	7.47	
Total valid votes		7,519	100.00	
Source(s) "Quebec East, Quebec (1867-08-06 - 1968-04-22)". History of Federal Ridings Since 1867. Library of Parliament.

By-election on 27 October 1919 On Laurier's death, 17 February 1919
Party	Candidate	Votes
Opposition (Laurier Liberals)	Ernest Lapointe	6,222
Parti nationaliste	François-Xavier Galibois	2,283

1921 Canadian federal election
Party	Candidate	Votes
Liberal	Ernest Lapointe	9,005
Conservative	Rodolphe-Alfred Drapeau	1,424

By-election on 19 January 1922 On Lapointe's acceptance of an office of emolument under the Crown, 3 January 1922
Party	Candidate	Votes
Liberal	Ernest Lapointe	acclaimed

1925 Canadian federal election
Party	Candidate	Votes
Liberal	Ernest Lapointe	9,193
Conservative	Pierre Audet	6,366

1926 Canadian federal election
Party	Candidate	Votes
Liberal	Ernest Lapointe	9,370
Conservative	Pierre Audet	6,438

By-election on 2 November 1926 On Lapointe's acceptance of an office of emolument under the Crown, 5 October 1926
Party	Candidate	Votes
Liberal	Ernest Lapointe	acclaimed

1930 Canadian federal election
Party	Candidate	Votes
Liberal	Ernest Lapointe	11,822
Conservative	Alleyn Taschereau	9,642

1935 Canadian federal election
Party	Candidate	Votes
Liberal	Ernest Lapointe	15,557
Conservative	Edgar Champoux	9,611

1940 Canadian federal election
Party	Candidate	Votes
Liberal	Ernest Lapointe	17,914
Independent Nationalist	Paul Bouchard	12,302

By-election on 9 February 1942 On Lapointe's death, 26 November 1941
Party	Candidate	Votes
Liberal	Louis St. Laurent	16,708
Canadian Party	Paul Bouchard	12,768

1945 Canadian federal election
Party	Candidate	Votes
Liberal	Louis St. Laurent	17,965
Independent	Noël Dorion	7,197
Social Credit	Gérard Mercier	2,816
Bloc populaire	Joseph-Norbert-Jules Thérien	1,463
Independent	Paul-Émile Latouche	280
Co-operative Commonwealth	François-Xavier Perron	231
Labor–Progressive	Joseph-Gaudias De Croiselles	109

1949 Canadian federal election
Party	Candidate	Votes
Liberal	Louis St. Laurent	25,832
Progressive Conservative	Mark Robert Drouin	7,876
Union des électeurs	Alphonse Tousignant	1,395

ॗ

1953 Canadian federal election
Party	Candidate	Votes
Liberal	Louis St. Laurent	25,945
Progressive Conservative	Raymond Maher	5,841
Labor–Progressive	Gérard Fortin	438
Locataire	Louis Seigneur	417
Anti-Communist	Patrick Walsh	333

1957 Canadian federal election
Party	Candidate	Votes
Liberal	Louis St. Laurent	27,364
Progressive Conservative	Louis Gagnon	9,900
Social Credit	Roland Roy	739

1958 Canadian federal election
Party	Candidate	Votes
Progressive Conservative	Yvon Tassé	22,285
Liberal	Maurice Lamontagne	21,649
Social Credit	Jean-Louis Hudon	1,104

1962 Canadian federal election
Party	Candidate	Votes
Social Credit	Jean Robert Beaulé	22,446
Liberal	Maurice Lamontagne	13,747
Progressive Conservative	Yvon Tassé	8,005
New Democratic	Roméo Bilodeau	703

1963 Canadian federal election
Party	Candidate	Votes
Social Credit	Jean Robert Beaulé	18,661
Liberal	Albert Parent	16,976
Progressive Conservative	Gaston Michaud	6,593
New Democratic	Paul-Henri Dufresne	1,450
Nationalist	Léo Tremblay	540

1965 Canadian federal election
Party	Candidate	Votes
Liberal	Gérard Duquet	18,900
Ralliement créditiste	Jean Robert Beaulé	13,642
Progressive Conservative	Robert Perron	5,546
New Democratic	Raymond Bruneau	2,870

=== Québec-Est ===
1968 Canadian federal election
Party	Candidate	Votes
Liberal	Gérard Duquet	14,945
Ralliement créditiste	Robert Robichaud	13,807
Progressive Conservative	Jacques Perron	4,607
New Democratic	Yvon Le-Tiec	953

1972 Canadian federal election
Party	Candidate	Votes
Liberal	Gérard Duquet	19,382
Social Credit	Robert Robichaud	10,926
Progressive Conservative	Théo Genest	6,152

1974 Canadian federal election
Party	Candidate	Votes
Liberal	Gérard Duquet	19,014
Social Credit	Robert Robichaud	5,442
Progressive Conservative	Médéric Robichaud	5,060
New Democratic	Raymond Laliberté	2,522
Marxist–Leninist	Francine Tremblay	210

1979 Canadian federal election
Party	Candidate	Votes
Liberal	Gérard Duquet	28,365
Social Credit	Rolland Savard	7,778
Progressive Conservative	J. Wilfrid Dufresne	3,128
New Democratic	Benoit Carrier	2,147
Rhinoceros	Michel Fafard	1,307
Union populaire	Antoine Makdissi	231
Marxist–Leninist	Claude Moreau	142

1980 Canadian federal election
Party	Candidate	Votes
Liberal	Gérard Duquet	27,546
New Democratic	Maurice Vaney	3,327
Progressive Conservative	Guy Charest	2,577
Social Credit	Roland Savard	1,998
Rhinoceros	Raymond Patrotrovitch Pollender	1,862
Union populaire	Paul Fortier	199
Independent	Hélène Jones	111
Marxist–Leninist	James Demers	108

1984 Canadian federal election
Party	Candidate	Votes
Progressive Conservative	Marcel Tremblay	19,782
Liberal	Gérard Duquet	14,332
New Democratic	Michel Leblanc	4,189
Rhinoceros	Michel Fafard	1,683
Parti nationaliste	Jean-Louis Bourque	790
Social Credit	Serge Bérubé	239
Commonwealth of Canada	Pierre Angers	96

1988 Canadian federal election
Party	Candidate	Votes
Progressive Conservative	Marcel Tremblay	29,493
Liberal	Rémi Bujold	13,732
New Democratic	Jeanne Lalanne	7,555
Rhinoceros	Jean-François Lehoux	1,028
Green	Reine Biron	906
Independent	Claude Moreau	207

1993 Canadian federal election
Party	Candidate	Votes
Bloc Québécois	Jean-Paul Marchand	34,203
Liberal	Camil Samson	14,003
Progressive Conservative	Marcel Tremblay	6,505
Natural Law	Pierre-Paul Paquet	1,059
New Democratic	Stéphanie Mitchell	938
Abolitionist	Henri Gagnon	364
National	Guy Sanfaçon	255

=== Québec East ===
1997 Canadian federal election
Party	Candidate	Votes
Bloc Québécois	Jean-Paul Marchand	23,245
Liberal	Remy Poulin	18,539
Progressive Conservative	Marquis Gagnon	14,533
Reform	Suzanne Bhérer	1,483
New Democratic	Cécile Rainville	1,240

2000 Canadian federal election
Party	Candidate	Votes
Liberal	Jean-Guy Carignan	21,813
Bloc Québécois	Jean-Paul Marchand	21,166
Alliance	Robert Martel	8,594
Progressive Conservative	Richard Joncas	3,727
New Democratic	Majella Desmeules	1,192

== See also ==
- List of Canadian electoral districts
- Historical federal electoral districts of Canada

Parliament of Canada
Preceded by Cape Breton; Glengarry	Constituency represented by the prime minister 1896–1911; 1948–1957	Succeeded by Halifax; Prince Albert
