= Gérard Duquet =

Canadian politician

Official 1980 portrait

Gérard Duquet (17 April 1909 – 26 January 1986) was a Liberal party member of the House of Commons of Canada. He was born in Montmorency, Quebec and became a business agent, businessman and manager by career.

He represented the Quebec East electoral district which he first won in the 1965 federal election. The riding once been held by Prime Ministers Wilfrid Laurier and Louis St. Laurent; Duquet was the first Liberal to win it since St. Laurent's retirement in 1958. since He won re-election in the 1968, 1972, 1974, 1979 and 1980 federal elections. Duquet served six consecutive terms from the 27th through the 32nd Canadian Parliaments.

Duquet was defeated in the 1984 federal election by Marcel Tremblay of the Progressive Conservative party.

== Electoral record ==
1974 Canadian federal election: Quebec East
Party	Candidate	Votes	%	±%
Liberal	Gérard Duquet	19,014	58.96	
Social Credit	Robert Robichaud	5,442	16.88	
Progressive Conservative	Médéric Robichaud	5,060	15.69	
New Democratic	Raymond Laliberté	2,522	7.82	
Marxist–Leninist	Francine Tremblay	210	0.65	
Total valid votes		32,248	100.00	
Total rejected ballots		1,784		
Turnout		34,032	64.89	
Electors on the lists		52,449		
Source: Report of the Chief Electoral Officer, Thirtieth General Election, 1974.
lop.parl.ca
