= Alfred Thibaudeau =

Canadian politician

The Honourable Alfred Arthur Thibaudeau
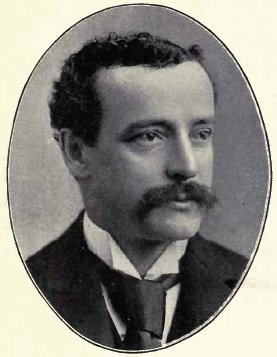

Senator for De la Vallière, Quebec
- In office August 22, 1896 – August 15, 1926
- Appointed by: Wilfrid Laurier
- Preceded by: Auguste-Réal Angers
- Succeeded by: Donat Raymond

Personal details
- Born: December 1, 1860 Quebec City, Canada East
- Died: August 15, 1926 (aged 65)
- Party: Liberal
- Occupation: Business executive, wholesaler

Alfred Arthur Thibaudeau (December 1, 1860 – August 15, 1926) was a Canadian politician. He became Senator and Governor of Université Laval.

Born in Quebec City, the son of Isidore Thibaudeau, a Quebec businessman and political figure in Upper Canada, Thibaudeau was educated at the Quebec High School.

He was the head of the firm of Thibaudeau Brothers. He was the president of the Wholesale Dry-Goods Association, and was a member of Council of the Montreal Board of Trade.

He was a director of the Notre Dame Hospital, Governor of Université Laval, director of the Great West Life Assurance Company, and of the Park & Island Railway Co. of Montreal. He was appointed to the Senate in August, 1896 on the advice of Wilfrid Laurier representing the senatorial division of De la Vallière, Quebec.

A Liberal, he served for almost 30 years before dying in office in 1926.
