= Roger Clavet =

Canadian politician from Quebec

Roger Clavet (born February 8, 1953) is a Canadian politician from Quebec. A journalist, he was first elected to the House of Commons of Canada in the 2004 Canadian federal election. He was a member of the Bloc Québécois for the riding of Louis-Hébert. He was the Bloc's critic of Asia-Pacific. He was defeated in the 2006 federal election.

Clavet was born in Quebec City, Quebec.

Parliament of Canada
Preceded by Hélène Scherrer	Member of Parliament for Louis-Hébert; 2004-2006	Succeeded by Luc Harvey
