= Bernard Cleary =

Canadian politician (1937–2020)

Bernard Cleary MP

Member of Parliament for Louis-Saint-Laurent
- In office 2004–2006
- Preceded by: first member
- Succeeded by: Josée Verner

Personal details
- Born: May 8, 1937 Mashteuiatsh, Quebec, Canada
- Died: July 27, 2020 (aged 83) Charny, Quebec, Canada
- Party: Bloc Québécois

Bernard Cleary (May 8, 1937 – July 27, 2020) was a Canadian politician.

Cleary was first elected to the House of Commons of Canada in the 2004 Canadian federal election. He was the Bloc Québécois member of parliament for the riding of Louis-Saint-Laurent. He was the Bloc's critic to the Minister of Indian Affairs and Northern Development. Prior to being elected, Cleary was a businessman, chief negotiator, journalist and professor.

In 2006, he was defeated by Josée Verner from the Conservative Party of Canada.

Cleary was born in Mashteuiatsh, Quebec. He was the first person of Aboriginal descent to be elected in Quebec, as well as the first Innu person elected from any province, to the House of Commons.
