= Luc Harvey =

Canadian politician (born 1964)

Leader of the Conservative Party of Quebec
- In office January 18, 2012 – September 11, 2012
- Preceded by: Serge Fontaine
- Succeeded by: Albert De Martin (interim)

Member of the Parliament for Louis-Hébert
- In office January 23, 2006 – October 14, 2008
- Preceded by: Roger Clavet
- Succeeded by: Pascal-Pierre Paillé

Personal details
- Born: Luc Harvey; April 4, 1964 (age 62) Chicoutimi, Quebec, Canada
- Party: Conservative Party of Quebec (2012–present)
- Other political affiliations: Conservative Party of Canada (2006–present)
- Spouse: Betty Harvey
- Children: 6, including Magali Harvey
- Education: Université Laval
- Profession: Business manager/computer engineer

Luc Harvey (born April 4, 1964) is a Canadian politician and the former Member of Parliament for the riding of Louis-Hébert in Quebec from 2006 to 2008. He served as the leader of the Conservative Party of Quebec from January to September 2012. Harvey was born in Chicoutimi, Quebec.

Harvey graduated from Université Laval with a bachelor's degree in political science, and studied English literature at the University of Guelph. Prior to being elected, he was in charge of business strategies at Centre Financier ASSEP, a life insurance broker. In 2006, Harvey ran for office as a member of the Conservative Party against Bloc Québécois politician Roger Clavet and won with 34.22% of the vote.

Harvey attained attention during the 2008 federal election campaign, when he confronted and loudly castigated Bloc leader Gilles Duceppe at the Public Market Sainte-Foy. Duceppe dismissed Harvey by calling him an "imbecile" who "asked why Canada is not in the European Union." Harvey was ultimately defeated by Bloc candidate Pascal-Pierre Paillé during this election.

Harvey has also worked on developing an electronic system designed for aircraft engines, and an experimental plane with Denis Lambert and André Beaudoin. The plane was a winner at the EAA Air Venture Oshkosh show.

In 2011, Harvey bought an old mansion that was converted into a daycare centre. Located less than 2 km of the bridges of Quebec, this centre will be able to receive nearly 160 children in the summer of 2012.

During his free time, Harvey has also worked on the development of the controller shower Geni, of which he is one of the patent owners.
