= Results of the 2006 Canadian federal election by riding =

The following are the individual results for the 2006 Canadian federal election.

Abbreviations guide

- (Ind.) - **Independent**
- Minor parties:
  - (AAEVP) **Animal Alliance Environment Voters Party of Canada**
  - (CAP) - **Canadian Action Party**
  - (CHP) - **Christian Heritage Party**
  - (Comm.) - **Communist Party**
  - (FPNP) - **First Peoples National Party of Canada**
  - (Libert.) - **Libertarian Party**
  - (Mar.) - **Marijuana Party**
  - (M-L) - **Marxist–Leninist Party**
  - (PC) - **Progressive Canadian Party**
  - (WBP) - **Western Block Party**

Names in boldface type represent either Cabinet members or opposition party leaders.
Candidates' names are as registered with Elections Canada.
Vote totals are those validated by Elections Canada; media coverage is usually based on preliminary totals and often differs from the final numbers.

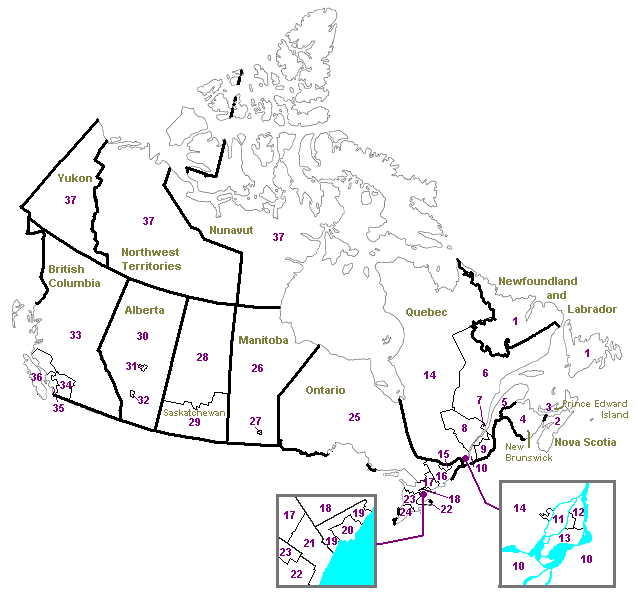

== Newfoundland and Labrador ==
| Electoral district | Candidates | | | | Incumbent |
| Electoral district | Liberal | Conservative | NDP | Green | Incumbent |
|---|---|---|---|---|---|
| Avalon | Bill Morrow; 14,318; 38.58% | Fabian Manning; 19,132; 51.55% | Eugene Conway; 3,365; 9.07% | Shannon Hillier; 297; 0.80% | **John Efford**† |
| Bonavista—Gander— Grand Falls—Windsor | Scott Simms; 19,866; 52.04% | Aaron Hynes; 15,376; 40.28% | Sandra Cooze; 2,668; 6.99% | Judy Davis; 265; 0.69% | Scott Simms |
| Humber—St. Barbe—Baie Verte | Gerry Byrne; 17,208; 52.90% | Cyril Jr. Pelley; 10,137; 31.16% | Holly Pike; 4,847; 14.90% | Martin Hanzalek; 339; 1.04% | Gerry Byrne |
| Labrador | Todd Norman Russell; 5,768; 50.53% | Joe Goudie; 4,528; 39.67% | Jacob Edward Larkin; 1,037; 9.08% | Gail Zwicker; 82; 0.72% | Todd Russell (Note: Russell won seat in byelection held May 24, 2005. Previously held by Liberal Lawrence D. O'Brien (died December 16, 2004).) |
| Random—Burin—St. George's | Bill Matthews; 13,652; 45.49% | Cynthia Downey; 12,232; 40.76% | Amanda Will; 3,702; 12.34% | Mark Brennan; 426; 1.42% | Bill Matthews |
| St. John's East | Paul Antle; 14,345; 34.95% | Norman Doyle; 19,110; 46.56% | Mike Kehoe; 7,190; 17.52% | Stephen Eli Harris; 402; 0.98% | Norman Doyle |
| St. John's South—Mount Pearl | Siobhan Coady; 12,295; 33.01% | Loyola Hearn; 16,644; 44.69% | Peg Norman; 8,073; 21.67% | Barry Crozier; 235; 0.63% | Loyola Hearn |

== Prince Edward Island ==
| Electoral district | Candidates | | | | | Incumbent |
| Electoral district | Liberal | Conservative | NDP | Green | Other | Incumbent |
|---|---|---|---|---|---|---|
| Cardigan | Lawrence MacAulay; 11,542; 56.21% | Don Gillis; 6,923; 33.72% | Edith Perry; 1,535; 7.48% | Haida Arsenault-Antolick; 533; 2.60% | | Lawrence MacAulay |
| Charlottetown | Shawn Murphy; 9,586; 50.16% | Tom DeBlois; 6,524; 34.14% | Brian Pollard; 2,126; 11.12% | David Lobie Daughton; 586; 3.07% | Andrew J. Chisholm (Mar.); 193 1.01% | Shawn Murphy |
| Charlottetown | Shawn Murphy; 9,586; 50.16% | Tom DeBlois; 6,524; 34.14% | Brian Pollard; 2,126; 11.12% | David Lobie Daughton; 586; 3.07% | Baird Judson (CHP); 97 0.51% | Shawn Murphy |
| Egmont | Joe McGuire; 10,288; 53.17% | Edward Guergis; 5,991; 30.96% | Regena Kaye Russell; 1,847; 9.55% | Ron Matsusaki; 1,005; 5.19% | Michael Nesbitt (Ind.); 219; 1.13% | Joe McGuire |
| Malpeque | Wayne Easter; 9,779; 50.48% | George Noble; 6,708; 34.63% | George Marshall; 1,983; 10.24% | Sharon Labchuk; 901; 4.65% | | Wayne Easter |

== Nova Scotia ==
| Electoral district | Candidates | | | | | Incumbent |
| Electoral district | Liberal | Conservative | NDP | Green | Other | Incumbent |
|---|---|---|---|---|---|---|
| Cape Breton—Canso | Rodger Cuzner; 21,424; 53.19% | Kenzie MacNeil; 9,740; 24.18% | Hector Morrison; 8,111; 20.14% | Rob Hines; 1,006; 2.5% | | Rodger Cuzner |
| Central Nova | Dan Walsh; 10,349; 24.56% | Peter G. MacKay; 17,134; 40.66% | Alexis MacDonald; 13,861; 32.89% | David Orton; 671; 1.59% | Allan H. Bezanson (M-L); 124; 0.29% | Peter MacKay |
| Cumberland—Colchester— Musquodoboit Valley | Gary Richard; 10,299; 23.89% | Bill Casey; 22,439; 52.04% | Margaret Sagar; 8,944; 20.74% | N. Bruce Farrell; 910; 2.11% | Rick Simpson (Ind.); 524; 1.22% | Bill Casey |
| Dartmouth—Cole Harbour | Mike Savage; 19,027; 42.32% | Robert A. Campbell; 10,259; 22.82% | Peter Mancini; 14,612; 32.50% | Elizabeth Perry; 1,005; 2.24% | Charles Spurr (M-L); 56; 0.12% | Michael Savage |
| Halifax | Martin MacKinnon; 15,437; 30.90% | Andrew House; 8,993; 18.00% | Alexa McDonough; 23,420; 46.88% | Nick Wright; 1,948; 3.90% | Tony Seed (M-L); 164; 0.33% | Alexa McDonough |
| Halifax West | **Geoff Regan**; 21,818; 49.36% | Rakesh Khosla; 10,184; 23.04% | Alan Hill; 10,798; 24.43% | Thomas Trappenberg; 1,406; 3.18% | | **Geoff Regan** |
| Kings—Hants | **Scott Brison**; 19,491; 45.56% | Bob Mullan; 13,772; 32.19% | Mary DeWolfe; 8,138; 19.02% | Sheila Richardson; 947; 2.21% | Chummy Anthony (Mar.); 436; 1.02% | **Scott Brison** |
| Sackville—Eastern Shore | Bill Fleming; 9,921; 22.99% | Paul Francis; 9,450; 21.90% | Peter Stoffer; 22,848; 52.95% | Richard MacDonald; 933; 2.16% | | Peter Stoffer |
| South Shore—St. Margaret's | Darian Malcom Huskilson; 11,629; 28.36% | Gerald Gordon Keddy; 15,108; 36.85% | Gordon S. Earle; 11,689; 28.51% | Katie Morris Boudreau; 1,198; 2.92% | James Hnatiuk (CHP); 1,376; 3.36% | Gerald Keddy |
| Sydney—Victoria | Mark Eyking; 20,277; 49.88% | Howie MacDonald; 7,455; 18.34% | John Hugh Edwards; 11,587; 28.50% | Chris Milburn; 1,336; 3.29% | | Mark Eyking |
| West Nova | Robert Thibault; 17,734; 39.24% | Greg Kerr; 17,222; 38.11% | Arthur Bull; 8,512; 18.84% | Matthew Granger; 1,040; 2.30% | Ken Griffiths (Ind.); 682; 1.51% | Robert Thibault |

== New Brunswick ==
| Electoral district | Candidates | | | | | Incumbent |
| Electoral district | Liberal | Conservative | NDP | Green | Other | Incumbent |
|---|---|---|---|---|---|---|
| Acadie—Bathurst | Marcelle Mersereau; 15,504; 30.71% | Serge Savoie; 8,513; 16.86% | Yvon Godin; 25,195; 49.90% | Philippe Rousselle; 699; 1.38% | Ulric DeGrâce (Ind.); 219 0.43% | Yvon Godin |
| Acadie—Bathurst | Marcelle Mersereau; 15,504; 30.71% | Serge Savoie; 8,513; 16.86% | Yvon Godin; 25,195; 49.90% | Philippe Rousselle; 699; 1.38% | Eric Landry (Ind.); 362 0.72% | Yvon Godin |
| Beauséjour | Dominic LeBlanc; 22,012; 47.55% | Omer Leger; 14,919; 32.23% | Neil Gardner; 7,717; 16.67% | Anna Girouard; 1,290; 2.79% | J. Frank Comeau (Ind.); 357; 0.77% | Dominic LeBlanc |
| Fredericton | **Andy Scott**; 19,649; 41.80% | Pat Lynch; 16,292; 34.66% | John Carty; 9,988; 21.25% | Philip Duchastel; 884; 1.88% | David Raymond Amos (Ind.); 198; 0.42% | **Andy Scott** |
| Fundy Royal | Eldon Hunter; 9,979; 27.34% | Rob Moore; 17,630; 48.31% | Rob Moir; 7,696; 21.09% | Patty Donovan; 1,189; 3.26% | | Rob Moore |
| Madawaska—Restigouche | Jean-Claude J. C. D'Amours; 13,734; 38.02% | Jean-Pierre Ouellet; 12,849; 35.57% | Rodolphe Martin; 8,322; 23.04% | Irka Laplante; 1,220; 3.38% | | Jean-Claude D'Amours |
| Miramichi | Charles Isaac Hubbard; 13,960; 42.27% | Mike Morrison; 11,250; 34.07% | Jeannette Manuel-Allain; 5,587; 16.92% | John Welsford Bethell; 587; 1.78% | Danny Gay (Ind.); 1,640; 4.97% | Charles Hubbard |
| Moncton—Riverview—Dieppe | Brian Murphy; 22,918; 47.71% | Charles Doucet; 14,464; 30.11% | David Hackett; 9,095; 18.93% | Camille Labchuk; 1,409; 2.93% | Ron Pomerleau (CAP); 150; 0.31% | **Claudette Bradshaw**† |
| New Brunswick Southwest | Stan Smith; 8,877; 26.79% | Greg Thompson; 18,155; 54.80% | Andrew Graham; 5,178; 15.63% | Erik Millett; 922; 2.78% | | Greg Thompson |
| Saint John | Paul Zed; 17,202; 42.92% | John Wallace; 15,753; 39.30% | Terry Albright; 6,267; 15.64% | Vern M. Garnett; 858; 2.14% | | Paul Zed |
| Tobique—Mactaquac | Andy Savoy; 15,558; 42.86% | Mike Allen; 15,894; 43.78% | Alice Finnamore; 4,172; 11.49% | Robert Bérubé Jr. 679; 1.87% | | Andy Savoy |

== Quebec ==
=== Eastern Quebec ===
| Electoral district | Candidates | | | | | | Incumbent |
| Electoral district | BQ | Liberal | Conservative | NDP | Green | Independent | Incumbent |
|---|---|---|---|---|---|---|---|
| Gaspésie—Îles-de-la-Madeleine | Raynald Blais; 17,678; 42.69% | Mario Lévesque; 7,977; 19.26% | Gaston Langlais; 13,347; 32.23% | Sylvie Dauphinais; 1,225; 2.96% | Bob Eichenberger; 1,183; 2.86% | | Raynald Blais |
| Haute-Gaspésie—La Mitis—Matane—Matapédia | Jean-Yves Roy; 15,721; 46.04% | Kim Leclerc; 4,463; 13.07% | Rodrigue Drapeau; 10,157; 29.75% | Stéphane Ricard; 2,116; 6.20% | Sarah Desjardins; 910; 2.67% | Yvan Côté; 778; 2.28% | Jean-Yves Roy |
| Lévis—Bellechasse | Réal Lapierre; 16,223; 29.02% | Shirley Baril; 4,581; 8.19% | Steven Blaney; 25,940; 46.40% | Eric Boucher; 2,590; 4.63% | Mathieu Castonguay; 2,293; 4.10% | Normand Cadrin; 4,275; 7.65% | Réal Lapierre |
| Montmagny—L'Islet—Kamouraska—Rivière-du-Loup | Paul Crête; 24,117; 52.44% | Lise M. Vachon; 6,466; 14.06% | Daniel Nadeau; 11,529; 25.07% | Myriam Leblanc; 2,107; 4.58% | Serge Lemay; 1,768; 3.84% | | Paul Crête |
| Rimouski-Neigette—Témiscouata—Les Basques | Louise Thibault; 19,804; 46.38% | Michel Tremblay; 8,254; 19.33% | Roger Picard; 9,481; 22.20% | Guy Caron; 4,186; 9.80% | François Bédard; 973; 2.28% | | Louise Thibault |

=== Côte-Nord and Saguenay ===
| Electoral district | Candidates | | | | | | Incumbent |
| Electoral district | BQ | Liberal | Conservative | NDP | Green | Independent | Incumbent |
|---|---|---|---|---|---|---|---|
| Chicoutimi—Le Fjord | Robert Bouchard; 19,226; 38.49% | André Harvey; 14,581; 29.19% | Alcide Boudreault; 12,350; 24.72% | Éric Dubois; 2,571; 5.15% | Jean-Martin Gauthier; 1,226; 2.45% | | Robert Bouchard |
| Jonquière—Alma | Sébastien Gagnon; 20,569; 39.30% | Gilles Savard; 1,550; 2.96% | Jean-Pierre Blackburn; 27,262; 52.09% | Martin Bertrand; 2,028; 3.87% | Sylvain Dompierre; 928; 1.77% | | Sébastien Gagnon |
| Manicouagan | Gérard Asselin; 18,601; 51.10% | Randy Jones; 5,214; 14.32% | Pierre Paradis; 6,910; 18.98% | Pierre Ducasse; 4,657; 12.79% | Jacques Gélineau; 824; 2.26% | Eric Vivier; 195; 0.54% | Gérard Asselin |
| Montmorency—Charlevoix— Haute-Côte-Nord | Michel Guimond; 22,169; 49.11% | Robert Gauthier; 3,989; 8.84% | Yves Laberge; 14,559; 32.25% | Martin Cauchon; 2,896; 6.42% | Yves Jourdain; 1,527; 3.38% | | Michel Guimond; Charlevoix—Montmorency |
| Roberval—Lac-Saint-Jean | Michel Gauthier; 17,586; 45.20% | Luc Chiasson; 3,014; 7.75% | Ghislain Lavoie; 14,463; 37.18% | François Privé; 2,151; 5.53% | Sébastien Girard; 1,689; 4.34% | | Michel Gauthier; Roberval |

=== Quebec City ===
| Electoral district | Candidates | | | | | | Incumbent |
| Electoral district | BQ | Liberal | Conservative | NDP | Green | Other | Incumbent |
|---|---|---|---|---|---|---|---|
| Beauport—Limoilou | Christian Simard; 18,589; 37.87% | Yves Picard; 4,929; 10.04% | Sylvie Boucher; 19,409; 39.54% | Simon-Pierre Beaudet; 3,917; 7.98% | Mario Laprise; 2,005; 4.08% | Jean Bédard (M–L); 234; 0.48% | Christian Simard; Beauport |
| Charlesbourg—Haute-Saint-Charles | Richard Marceau; 19,034; 38.28% | Valérie Giguère; 4,364; 8.78% | Daniel Petit; 20,406; 41.04% | Isabelle Martineau; 3,084; 6.20% | Les Parsons; 1,262; 2.54% | Daniel Pelletier (Ind.); 1,567; 3.15% | Richard Marceau; Charlesbourg |
| Louis-Hébert | Roger Clavet; 20,101; 34.08% | Hélène Chalifour Scherrer; 8,852; 15.01% | Luc Harvey; 20,332; 34.47% | Denis Blanchette; 5,351; 9.07% | Robert Hudon; 2,517; 4.27% | Francis Fortin (Ind.); 565 0.96% | Roger Clavet |
| Louis-Hébert | Roger Clavet; 20,101; 34.08% | Hélène Chalifour Scherrer; 8,852; 15.01% | Luc Harvey; 20,332; 34.47% | Denis Blanchette; 5,351; 9.07% | Robert Hudon; 2,517; 4.27% | Stefan Jetchick (CHP); 116 0.20% | Roger Clavet |
| Louis-Hébert | Roger Clavet; 20,101; 34.08% | Hélène Chalifour Scherrer; 8,852; 15.01% | Luc Harvey; 20,332; 34.47% | Denis Blanchette; 5,351; 9.07% | Robert Hudon; 2,517; 4.27% | Frédérick Têtu (Ind.); 1,147 1.94% | Roger Clavet |
| Louis-Saint-Laurent | Bernard Cleary; 11,997; 24.19% | Isa Gros-Louis; 3,180; 6.41% | Josée Verner; 28,606; 57.68% | Robert Donnelly; 2,848; 5.74% | Lucien Gravelle; 1,468; 2.96% | Christian Légaré (Ind.); 1,498; 3.02% | Bernard Cleary |
| Québec | Christiane Gagnon; 20,845; 41.53% | Caroline Drolet; 5,743; 11.44% | Frédérik Boisvert; 14,943; 29.77% | Michaël Lessard; 4,629; 9.22% | Yonnel Bonaventure; 2,372; 4.73% | Dan Aubut (Ind.); 813 1.62% | Christiane Gagnon |
| Québec | Christiane Gagnon; 20,845; 41.53% | Caroline Drolet; 5,743; 11.44% | Frédérik Boisvert; 14,943; 29.77% | Michaël Lessard; 4,629; 9.22% | Yonnel Bonaventure; 2,372; 4.73% | Francis Bedard (Libert.); 325 0.65% | Christiane Gagnon |
| Québec | Christiane Gagnon; 20,845; 41.53% | Caroline Drolet; 5,743; 11.44% | Frédérik Boisvert; 14,943; 29.77% | Michaël Lessard; 4,629; 9.22% | Yonnel Bonaventure; 2,372; 4.73% | Alexandre Raymond-Labrie (PC); 520 1.04% | Christiane Gagnon |

=== Central Quebec ===
| Electoral district | Candidates | | | | | | Incumbent |
| Electoral district | BQ | Liberal | Conservative | NDP | Green | Other | Incumbent |
|---|---|---|---|---|---|---|---|
| Bas-Richelieu—Nicolet—Bécancour | Louis Plamondon; 27,742; 55.92% | Ghislaine Provencher; 6,438; 12.98% | Marie-Ève Hélie-Lambert; 11,588; 23.36% | Marie-Claude Roberge Cartier; 2,248; 4.53% | Louis Lacroix; 1,595; 3.22% | | Louis Plamondon; Richelieu |
| Berthier—Maskinongé | Guy André; 26,191; 48.50% | Serge Lafrenière; 5,605; 10.38% | Marie-Claude Godue; 16,958; 31.40% | Anne-Marie Aubert; 3,319; 6.15% | Nathalie Gratton; 1,925; 3.56% | | Guy André |
| Joliette | Pierre A. Paquette; 28,630; 54.12% | Gérard Leclerc; 5,245; 9.92% | Sylvie Lavallée; 14,192; 26.83% | Jacques Trudeau; 2,745; 5.19% | Jean-François Lévêque; 2,086; 3.94% | | Pierre Paquette |
| Lotbinière—Chutes-de-la-Chaudière | Odina Desrochers; 15,402; 29.64% | Eric Paradis; 2,820; 5.43% | Jacques Gourde; 28,236; 54.34% | Raymond Côté; 3,529; 6.79% | Shirley Picknell; 1,978; 3.81% | | Odina Desrochers |
| Montcalm | Roger Gaudet; 34,975; 62.28% | Luc Fortin; 4,645; 8.27% | Michel Paulette; 10,818; 19.26% | Nancy Leclerc; 3,766; 6.71% | Wendy Gorchinsky; 1,954; 3.48% | | Roger Gaudet |
| Portneuf—Jacques-Cartier | Guy Côté; 13,094; 25.88% | Gilles Landry; 2,489; 4.92% | Howard M. Bruce; 11,472; 22.67% | Jean-Marie Fiset; 1,956; 3.87% | Jérôme Beaulieu; 1,431; 2.83% | André Arthur (Ind.); 20,158; 39.84% | Guy Côté; Portneuf |
| Repentigny | Benoît Sauvageau; 34,958; 62.42% | Josyanne Forest; 4,847; 8.65% | Claude Jr Lafortune; 10,124; 18.08% | Réjean Bellemare; 4,337; 7.74% | Adam Jastrzebski; 1,742; 3.11% | | Benoît Sauvageau |
| Saint-Maurice—Champlain | Jean-Yves Laforest; 21,532; 44.34% | Lucille Whissell; 5,612; 11.56% | Martial Toupin; 16,028; 33.01% | Claude Larocque; 3,684; 7.59% | Pierre Audette; 1,705; 3.51% | | Marcel Gagnon† |
| Trois-Rivières | Paule Brunelle; 22,331; 45.87% | Martine Girard; 5,268; 10.82% | Luc Ménard; 15,423; 31.68% | Geneviève Boivin; 3,774; 7.75% | Linda Lavoie; 1,513; 3.11% | Paul Giroux (Mar.); 371; 0.76% | Paule Brunelle |

=== Eastern Townships ===
| Electoral district | Candidates | | | | | | Incumbent |
| Electoral district | BQ | Liberal | Conservative | NDP | Green | Other | Incumbent |
|---|---|---|---|---|---|---|---|
| Beauce | Patrice Moore; 10,997; 19.97% | Jacques Lussier; 4,364; 7.92% | Maxime Bernier; 36,915; 67.02% | Cléo Chartier; 1,405; 2.55% | Jean-Claude Roy; 1,397; 2.54% | | Claude Drouin† |
| Brome—Missisquoi | Christian Ouellet; 18,596; 38.33% | Denis Paradis; 13,569; 27.97% | David Marler; 9,874; 20.35% | Josianne Jetté; 2,839; 5.85% | Michel Champagne; 1,721; 3.55% | Heward Grafftey (PC); 1,921; 3.96% | Denis Paradis |
| Compton—Stanstead | France Bonsant; 21,316; 42.77% | David Price; 11,126; 22.32% | Gary Caldwell; 12,131; 24.34% | Stéphane Bürgi; 3,099; 6.22% | Gaétan Perreault; 2,171; 4.36% | | France Bonsant |
| Drummond | Pauline Picard; 22,575; 49.69% | Éric Cardinal; 7,437; 16.37% | Jean-Marie Pineault; 10,134; 22.30% | François Choquette; 2,870; 6.32% | Jean-Benjamin Milot; 2,418; 5.32% | | Pauline Picard |
| Mégantic—L'Érable | Marc Boulianne; 15,410; 32.62% | Yvan Corriveau; 4,912; 10.40% | Christian Paradis; 23,550; 49.85% | Isabelle Tremblay; 1,836; 3.89% | Jean François Hamel; 1,534; 3.25% | | Marc Boulianne |
| Richmond—Arthabaska | André Bellavance; 24,466; 47.89% | Louis Napoléon Mercier; 5,294; 10.36% | Jean Landry; 16,465; 32.23% | Isabelle Maguire; 2,507; 4.91% | Laurier Busque; 2,355; 4.61% | | André Bellavance |
| Saint-Hyacinthe—Bagot | Yvan Loubier; 27,838; 56.02% | Stéphane Deschênes; 4,884; 9.83% | Huguette Guilhaumon; 12,323; 24.80% | Joëlle Chevrier; 2,723; 5.48% | Jacques Tétreault; 1,925; 3.87% | | Yvan Loubier |
| Shefford | Robert Vincent; 22,159; 43.09% | Diane St-Jacques; 12,043; 23.42% | Jean Lambert; 12,734; 24.76% | Paula Maundcote; 2,431; 4.73% | Francine Brière; 2,061; 4.01% | | Robert Vincent |
| Sherbrooke | Serge Cardin; 27,112; 52.20% | Robert Pouliot; 6,863; 13.21% | Marc Nadeau; 10,763; 20.72% | Martin Plaisance; 4,646; 8.95% | Michel Quirion; 2,238; 4.31% | Claudia Laroche-Martel (Ind.); 315; 0.61% | Serge Cardin |

=== Montérégie ===
| Electoral district | Candidates | | | | | | Incumbent |
| Electoral district | BQ | Liberal | Conservative | NDP | Green | Other | Incumbent |
|---|---|---|---|---|---|---|---|
| Beauharnois—Salaberry | Claude DeBellefeuille; 26,190; 47.53% | John Khawand; 8,272; 15.01% | David Couturier; 14,609; 26.51% | Cynthia Roy; 4,163; 7.56% | David Smith; 1,864; 3.38% | | Alain Boire† |
| Brossard—La Prairie | Marcel Lussier; 21,433; 37.17% | **Jacques Saada**; 20,190; 35.01% | Tenzin D. Khangsar; 9,749; 16.91% | Robert Nicolas; 4,301; 7.46% | François Desgroseilliers; 1,883; 3.27% | Normand Chouinard (M-L); 110; 0.19% | **Jacques Saada** |
| Chambly—Borduas | Yves Lessard; 33,703; 54.70% | Chantal Bouchard; 6,933; 11.25% | Yves Bourassa; 12,703; 20.62% | Alain Dubois; 5,167; 8.39% | Olivier Adam; 3,113; 5.05% | | Yves Lessard |
| Châteauguay—Saint-Constant | Carole Freeman; 28,274; 51.38% | Charles Ghorayeb; 10,295; 18.71% | Rosaire Turcot; 11,219; 20.39% | Ehsan Mohammadian; 2,865; 5.21% | Alain Rioux; 2,375; 4.32% | | Denise Poirier-Rivard† |
| Longueuil—Pierre-Boucher | Caroline St-Hilaire; 27,425; 55.20% | Lancine Diawara; 6,260; 12.60% | Sébastien Legris; 9,331; 18.78% | Philippe Haese; 4,273; 8.60% | Adam Sommerfeld; 1,995; 4.02% | David Fiset (Mar.); 397; 0.80% | Caroline St-Hilaire |
| Saint-Bruno—Saint-Hubert | Carole Lavallée; 26,509; 50.29% | Kerline Joseph; 8,643; 16.40% | Nicolas Waldteufel; 10,451; 19.83% | Marie Henretta; 4,359; 8.27% | Elisabeth Papin; 2,364; 4.48% | Jules Édouard Gaudet (Ind.); 387; 0.73% | Carole Lavallée |
| Saint-Jean | Claude Bachand; 28,070; 53.98% | Maro Akoury; 6,426; 12.36% | Francis Lévesque; 11,516; 22.14% | Mathieu-Gilles Lanciault; 3,622; 6.96% | Véronique Bisaillon; 2,371; 4.56% | | Claude Bachand |
| Saint-Lambert | Maka Kotto; 20,949; 45.30% | Jean-Jacques Hermans; 10,777; 23.31% | Patrick Clune; 9,097; 19.67% | Ronaldo Garcia; 3,404; 7.36% | Sonia Ziadé; 1,819; 3.93% | Normand Fournier (M-L); 196; 0.42% | Maka Kotto |
| Vaudreuil-Soulanges | Meili Faille; 26,925; 43.08% | Marc Garneau; 17,774; 28.44% | Stéphane Bourgon; 11,888; 19.02% | Bert Markgraf; 3,468; 5.55% | Pierre Pariseau Legault; 2,450; 3.92% | | Meili Faille |
| Verchères—Les Patriotes | Luc Malo; 30,250; 57.43% | Alanna Woods; 4,602; 8.74% | Jean-Félix Racicot; 11,479; 21.79% | Simon Vallée; 4,293; 8.15% | Carl Danis; 2,047; 3.89% | | Vacant (Note: Formerly held by Bloc MP Stéphane Bergeron, resigned November 9, 2005) |

=== Eastern Montreal ===
| Electoral district | Candidates | | | | | | | | Incumbent |
| Electoral district | BQ | Liberal | Conservative | NDP | Green | Marijuana | Marxist-Leninist | Other | Incumbent |
|---|---|---|---|---|---|---|---|---|---|
| Hochelaga | Réal Ménard; 25,570; 55.58% | Vicky Harvey; 7,932; 17.24% | Audrey Castonguay; 5,617; 12.21% | David-Roger Gagnon; 4,101; 8.91% | Rolf Bramann; 2,235; 4.86% | **Blair T. Longley**; 332; 0.72% | Christine Dandenault; 220; 0.48% | | Réal Ménard |
| Honoré-Mercier | Gérard Labelle; 17,879; 34.83% | Pablo Rodriguez; 19,622; 38.23% | Angelo M. Marino; 8,952; 17.44% | François Pilon; 3,191; 6.22% | Sylvain Castonguay; 1,502; 2.93% | | Hélène Héroux; 183; 0.36% | | Pablo Rodriguez |
| La Pointe-de-l'Île | Francine Lalonde; 29,368; 60.46% | Marie-Migniaud Dominique; 6,855; 14.11% | Christian Prévost; 7,402; 15.24% | Nicolas Tremblay; 3,407; 7.01% | Benjamin Rankin; 1,544; 3.18% | | | | Francine Lalonde |
| Laurier—Sainte-Marie | **Gilles Duceppe**; 26,773; 54.69% | Soeung Tang; 6,095; 12.45% | Carlos De Sousa; 3,124; 6.38% | François Grégoire; 8,165; 16.68% | Dylan Perceval-Maxwell; 4,064; 8.30% | Nicky Tanguay; 338; 0.69% | Ginette Boutet; 137; 0.28% | Jocelyne Leduc (Ind.); 157 0.32% | **Gilles Duceppe**; Laurier |
| Laurier—Sainte-Marie | **Gilles Duceppe**; 26,773; 54.69% | Soeung Tang; 6,095; 12.45% | Carlos De Sousa; 3,124; 6.38% | François Grégoire; 8,165; 16.68% | Dylan Perceval-Maxwell; 4,064; 8.30% | Nicky Tanguay; 338; 0.69% | Ginette Boutet; 137; 0.28% | Evelyn Elizabeth Ruiz (Comm.); 100 0.20% | **Gilles Duceppe**; Laurier |
| Rosemont—La Petite-Patrie | Bernard Bigras; 29,336; 55.99% | Suzanne Harvey; 8,259; 15.76% | Michel Sauvé; 4,873; 9.30% | Chantal Reeves; 6,051; 11.55% | Marc-André Gadoury; 3,457; 6.60% | Hugô St-Onge; 419; 0.80% | | | Bernard Bigras |

=== Western Montreal ===
| Electoral district | Candidates | | | | | | | Incumbent |
| Electoral district | BQ | Liberal | Conservative | NDP | Green | Marxist-Leninist | Other | Incumbent |
|---|---|---|---|---|---|---|---|---|
| Jeanne-Le Ber | Thierry St-Cyr; 20,213; 40.22% | **Liza Frulla**; 17,118; 34.06% | Pierre-Olivier Brunelle; 5,951; 11.84% | Matthew McLauchlin; 4,621; 9.19% | Claude William Genest; 2,357; 4.69% | | | **Liza Frulla** |
| Lac-Saint-Louis | Anne-Marie Guertin; 4,064; 7.65% | Francis Scarpaleggia; 25,588; 48.17% | Andrea Paine; 14,164; 26.66% | Daniel Quinn; 5,702; 10.73% | Peter Graham; 3,605; 6.79% | | | Francis Scarpaleggia |
| LaSalle—Émard | May Chiu; 13,501; 28.73% | **Paul Martin**; 22,751; 48.41% | Georges-Alexandre Bastien; 5,994; 12.75% | Russ Johnson; 2,805; 5.97% | Serge Bellemare; 1,512; 3.22% | Jean-Paul Bédard; 152; 0.32% | Jean-Philippe Lebleu (Ind.); 281; 0.60% | **Paul Martin** |
| Mount Royal | Guillaume Dussault; 2,112; 5.71% | **Irwin Cotler**; 24,248; 65.55% | Neil Martin Drabkin; 6,621; 17.90% | Nicolas R. Thibodeau; 2,479; 6.70% | Damien Pichereau; 1,423; 3.85% | Diane Johnston; 106; 0.29% | | **Irwin Cotler** |
| Notre-Dame-de-Grâce—Lachine | Alexandre Lambert; 9,385; 20.34% | Marlene Jennings; 20,235; 43.85% | Allen F. Mackenzie; 8,048; 17.44% | Peter Deslauriers; 5,455; 11.82% | Pierre-Albert Sévigny; 2,754; 5.97% | Rachel Hoffman; 118; 0.26% | Earl Wertheimer (Libert.); 152; 0.33% | Marlene Jennings |
| Outremont | Jacques Léonard; 11,778; 29.01% | **Jean-C. Lapierre**; 14,282; 35.18% | Daniel Fournier; 5,168; 12.73% | Léo-Paul Lauzon; 6,984; 17.20% | François Pilon; 1,957; 4.82% | Linda Sullivan; 88; 0.22% | Eric Roach Denis (Ind.); 101 0.25% | **Jean Lapierre** |
| Outremont | Jacques Léonard; 11,778; 29.01% | **Jean-C. Lapierre**; 14,282; 35.18% | Daniel Fournier; 5,168; 12.73% | Léo-Paul Lauzon; 6,984; 17.20% | François Pilon; 1,957; 4.82% | Linda Sullivan; 88; 0.22% | Yan Lacombe (Ind.); 85 0.21% | **Jean Lapierre** |
| Outremont | Jacques Léonard; 11,778; 29.01% | **Jean-C. Lapierre**; 14,282; 35.18% | Daniel Fournier; 5,168; 12.73% | Léo-Paul Lauzon; 6,984; 17.20% | François Pilon; 1,957; 4.82% | Linda Sullivan; 88; 0.22% | Régent Millette (Ind.); 22 0.05% | **Jean Lapierre** |
| Outremont | Jacques Léonard; 11,778; 29.01% | **Jean-C. Lapierre**; 14,282; 35.18% | Daniel Fournier; 5,168; 12.73% | Léo-Paul Lauzon; 6,984; 17.20% | François Pilon; 1,957; 4.82% | Linda Sullivan; 88; 0.22% | Philip Paynter (PC); 94 0.23% | **Jean Lapierre** |
| Outremont | Jacques Léonard; 11,778; 29.01% | **Jean-C. Lapierre**; 14,282; 35.18% | Daniel Fournier; 5,168; 12.73% | Léo-Paul Lauzon; 6,984; 17.20% | François Pilon; 1,957; 4.82% | Linda Sullivan; 88; 0.22% | Xavier Rochon (Ind.); 34 0.08% | **Jean Lapierre** |
| Pierrefonds—Dollard | Denis Martel; 5,901; 12.37% | Bernard Patry; 24,388; 51.12% | Don Rae; 11,013; 23.08% | Shameem Siddiqui; 3,664; 7.68% | Leo Williams; 2,645; 5.54% | Garnet Colly; 96; 0.20% | | Bernard Patry |
| Saint-Laurent—Cartierville | William Fayad; 6,192; 14.58% | **Stéphane Dion**; 25,412; 59.85% | Ishrat Alam; 5,590; 13.17% | Liz Elder; 3,279; 7.72% | Gilles Mercier; 1,810; 4.26% | Fernard Deschamps; 177; 0.42% | | **Stéphane Dion** |
| Westmount—Ville-Marie | Sophie Fréchette; 5,191; 12.56% | **Lucienne Robillard**; 18,884; 45.68% | Louise O'Sullivan; 7,295; 17.65% | Eric Wilson Steedman; 6,356; 15.37% | Julie Sabourin; 3,451; 8.35% | Serge Lachapelle; 94; 0.23% | Bill Sloan (Comm.); 69; 0.17% | **Lucienne Robillard** |

=== Northern Montreal and Laval ===
| Electoral district | Candidates | | | | | | Incumbent |
| Electoral district | BQ | Liberal | Conservative | NDP | Green | Other | Incumbent |
|---|---|---|---|---|---|---|---|
| Ahuntsic | Maria Mourani; 19,428; 38.91% | Eleni Bakopanos; 18,594; 37.24% | Étienne Morin; 6,119; 12.26% | Caroline Desrosiers; 3,948; 7.91% | Lynette Tremblay; 1,836; 3.68% | | Eleni Bakopanos |
| Bourassa | Apraham Niziblian; 13,777; 31.97% | Denis Coderre; 18,705; 43.41% | Liberato Martelli; 6,830; 15.85% | Stefano Saykaly; 2,237; 5.19% | François Boucher; 1,370; 3.18% | Geneviève Royer (M-L); 173; 0.40% | Denis Coderre |
| Papineau | Vivian Barbot; 17,775; 40.75% | **Pierre Pettigrew**; 16,785; 38.48% | Mustaque A. Sarker; 3,630; 8.32% | Marc Hasbani; 3,358; 7.70% | Louis-Philippe Verenka; 1,572; 3.60% | Mahmood-Raza Baig (CAP); 185 0.42% | **Pierre Pettigrew** |
| Papineau | Vivian Barbot; 17,775; 40.75% | **Pierre Pettigrew**; 16,785; 38.48% | Mustaque A. Sarker; 3,630; 8.32% | Marc Hasbani; 3,358; 7.70% | Louis-Philippe Verenka; 1,572; 3.60% | Peter Macrisopoulos (M-L); 317 0.73% | **Pierre Pettigrew** |
| Saint-Léonard—Saint-Michel | Justine Charlemagne; 7,772; 18.74% | Massimo Pacetti; 23,705; 57.17% | Ercolano Pingiotti; 5,975; 14.41% | Laura Colella; 2,831; 6.83% | Pierre-Louis Parant; 961; 2.32% | Stéphane Chénier (M-L); 219; 0.53% | Massimo Pacetti |

=== Laurentides, Outaouais and Northern Quebec ===
| Electoral district | Candidates | | | | | | Incumbent |
| Electoral district | BQ | Liberal | Conservative | NDP | Green | Marxist-Leninist | Incumbent |
|---|---|---|---|---|---|---|---|
| Abitibi—Baie-James— Nunavik—Eeyou | Yvon Lévesque; 13,928; 46.57% | Armand Caouette; 6,700; 22.40% | Gilles Gagnon; 6,261; 20.93% | Dominique Vaillancourt; 1,810; 6.05% | Pierre M. Denis; 1,210; 4.05% | | Yvon Lévesque; Nunavik—Eeyou |
| Abitibi—Témiscamingue | Marc Lemay; 24,637; 52.34% | Charles Lavergne; 6,501; 13.81% | Marie-Josée Carbonneau; 10,634; 22.59% | Christine Moore; 4,022; 8.54% | Patrick Rancourt; 1,279; 2.72% | | Marc Lemay |
| Argenteuil—Papineau—Mirabel | Mario Laframboise; 27,855; 52.13% | François-Hugues Liberge; 7,171; 13.42% | Suzanne Courville; 12,461; 23.32% | Alain Senécal; 3,466; 6.49% | Claude Sabourin; 2,480; 4.64% | | Mario Laframboise; Argenteuil—Mirabel |
| Gatineau | Richard Nadeau; 21,093; 39.25% | Françoise Boivin; 16,826; 31.31% | Patrick Robert; 9,014; 16.77% | Anne Levesque; 5,354; 9.96% | Gail Walker; 1,456; 2.71% | | Françoise Boivin |
| Hull—Aylmer | Alain Charette; 15,788; 29.35% | Marcel Proulx; 17,576; 32.67% | Gilles Poirier; 9,284; 17.26% | Pierre Laliberté; 8,334; 15.49% | Christian Doyle; 2,687; 4.99% | Gabriel Girard-Bernier; 125; 0.23% | Marcel Proulx |
| Laurentides—Labelle | Johanne Deschamps; 28,217; 53.82% | Jean-Pierre Fortin; 7,616; 14.53% | Jean-Serge Beauregard; 10,666; 20.35% | Rose-Aimée Auclair; 3,382; 6.45% | Richard Savignac; 2,543; 4.85% | | Johanne Deschamps |
| Pontiac | Christine Émond Lapointe; 13,698; 28.71% | David Smith; 11,561; 24.23% | Lawrence Cannon; 16,069; 33.68% | Céline Brault; 4,759; 9.98% | Moe Garahan; 1,512; 3.17% | Benoit Legros; 107; 0.22% | David Smith |
| Rivière-des-Mille-Îles | Gilles-A. Perron; 26,272; 53.90% | Robert Frégeau; 6,239; 12.80% | Érick Gauthier; 10,173; 20.87% | Francis Chartrand; 3,418; 7.01% | Marie Martine Bédard; 2,643; 5.42% | | Gilles Perron |
| Rivière-du-Nord | Monique Guay; 27,789; 59.08% | Yannick Guénette; 4,365; 9.28% | Pierre Albert; 9,769; 20.77% | Simon Bernier; 3,393; 7.21% | Maude Genet; 1,722; 3.66% | | Monique Guay |
| Terrebonne—Blainville | Diane Bourgeois; 30,197; 59.17% | Maxime Thériault; 4,576; 8.97% | Daniel Lebel; 10,212; 20.01% | Michel Le Clair; 3,829; 7.50% | Martin Drapeau; 2,216; 4.34% | | Diane Bourgeois |

== Ontario ==
The province of Ontario gave 54 of its 106 seats to the Liberals - a loss of 21 seats compared to the previous election of 2004. The Conservatives won 40 seats (up by 17), and the remaining 12 went to the NDP (up by 4).

=== Ottawa ===
| Electoral district | Candidates | | | | | Incumbent |
| Electoral district | Liberal | Conservative | NDP | Green | Other | Incumbent |
|---|---|---|---|---|---|---|
| Carleton—Mississippi Mills | Isabel Metcalfe; 16,360; 23.57% | Gordon O'Connor; 39,004; 56.19% | Tasha Bridgen; 8,677; 12.50% | Jake Cole; 4,544; 6.55% | George Kolaczynski (Mar.); 426 0.61% | Gordon O'Connor |
| Carleton—Mississippi Mills | Isabel Metcalfe; 16,360; 23.57% | Gordon O'Connor; 39,004; 56.19% | Tasha Bridgen; 8,677; 12.50% | Jake Cole; 4,544; 6.55% | **Tracy Parsons** (PC); 408 0.59% | Gordon O'Connor |
| Nepean—Carleton | Michael Gaffney; 20,111; 27.98% | Pierre Poilievre; 39,512; 54.97% | Laurel Gibbons; 8,274; 11.51% | Lori Gadzala; 3,976; 5.53% | | Pierre Poilievre |
| Ottawa Centre | Richard Mahoney; 19,468; 29.22% | Keith Fountain; 15,105; 22.67% | Paul Dewar; 24,609; 36.94% | David Chernushenko; 6,765; 10.15% | John Andrew Akpata (Mar.); 387 0.58% | Ed Broadbent† |
| Ottawa Centre | Richard Mahoney; 19,468; 29.22% | Keith Fountain; 15,105; 22.67% | Paul Dewar; 24,609; 36.94% | David Chernushenko; 6,765; 10.15% | Christian Legeais (M-L); 69 0.10% | Ed Broadbent† |
| Ottawa Centre | Richard Mahoney; 19,468; 29.22% | Keith Fountain; 15,105; 22.67% | Paul Dewar; 24,609; 36.94% | David Chernushenko; 6,765; 10.15% | Stuart Ryan (Comm.); 102 0.15% | Ed Broadbent† |
| Ottawa Centre | Richard Mahoney; 19,468; 29.22% | Keith Fountain; 15,105; 22.67% | Paul Dewar; 24,609; 36.94% | David Chernushenko; 6,765; 10.15% | Anwar Syed (Ind.); 121 0.18% | Ed Broadbent† |
| Ottawa—Orléans | Marc Godbout; 24,224; 39.08% | Royal Galipeau; 25,455; 41.06% | Mark Andrew Leahy; 9,354; 15.09% | Sarah Samplonius; 2,377; 3.83% | Alain Saint-Yves (Ind.); 578; 0.93% | Marc Godbout |
| Ottawa South | David McGuinty; 27,158; 44.15% | Allan Cutler; 23,028; 37.44% | Henri Sader; 8,138; 13.23% | John Ford; 2,913; 4.74% | Brad Thomson (PC); 273; 0.44% | David McGuinty |
| Ottawa—Vanier | **Mauril Bélanger**; 23,567; 42.31% | Paul Benoit; 15,970; 28.67% | Ric Dagenais; 12,145; 21.81% | Raphaël Thierrin; 3,675; 6.60% | Alexandre Legeais (M-L); 117 0.21% | **Mauril Bélanger** |
| Ottawa—Vanier | **Mauril Bélanger**; 23,567; 42.31% | Paul Benoit; 15,970; 28.67% | Ric Dagenais; 12,145; 21.81% | Raphaël Thierrin; 3,675; 6.60% | James C. Parsons (PC); 221 0.40% | **Mauril Bélanger** |
| Ottawa West—Nepean | Lee Farnworth; 20,250; 34.06% | John Baird; 25,607; 43.07% | Marlene Rivier; 9,626; 16.19% | Neil Adair; 2,941; 4.95% | Randy Bens (CAP); 121 0.20% | Marlene Catterall† |
| Ottawa West—Nepean | Lee Farnworth; 20,250; 34.06% | John Baird; 25,607; 43.07% | Marlene Rivier; 9,626; 16.19% | Neil Adair; 2,941; 4.95% | John Pacheco (Ind.); 905 1.52% | Marlene Catterall† |

=== Eastern Ontario ===
| Electoral district | Candidates | | | | | Incumbent |
| Electoral district | Liberal | Conservative | NDP | Green | Other | Incumbent |
|---|---|---|---|---|---|---|
| Glengarry— Prescott—Russell | René Berthiaume; 22,787; 41.19% | Pierre Lemieux; 22,990; 41.56% | Jo-Ann Fennessey; 7,049; 12.74% | Bonnie Jean-Louis; 2,494; 4.51% | | Don Boudria† |
| Kingston and the Islands | Peter Milliken; 28,548; 45.86% | Lou Grimshaw; 16,230; 26.07% | Rob Hutchison; 11,946; 19.19% | Eric Walton; 5,006; 8.04% | Don Rogers (CAP); 222 0.36% | Peter Milliken |
| Kingston and the Islands | Peter Milliken; 28,548; 45.86% | Lou Grimshaw; 16,230; 26.07% | Rob Hutchison; 11,946; 19.19% | Eric Walton; 5,006; 8.04% | Karl Eric Walker (Ind.); 296 0.48% | Peter Milliken |
| Lanark—Frontenac— Lennox and Addington | Geoff Turner; 14,709; 24.74% | Scott Reid; 30,367; 51.07% | Helen Forsey; 9,604; 16.15% | Mike Nickerson; 3,115; 5.24% | Jerry Ackerman (CAP); 429 0.72% | Scott Reid |
| Lanark—Frontenac— Lennox and Addington | Geoff Turner; 14,709; 24.74% | Scott Reid; 30,367; 51.07% | Helen Forsey; 9,604; 16.15% | Mike Nickerson; 3,115; 5.24% | Jeffrey Bogaerts (PC); 735 1.24% | Scott Reid |
| Lanark—Frontenac— Lennox and Addington | Geoff Turner; 14,709; 24.74% | Scott Reid; 30,367; 51.07% | Helen Forsey; 9,604; 16.15% | Mike Nickerson; 3,115; 5.24% | Ernest Rathwell (Mar.); 501 0.84% | Scott Reid |
| Leeds—Grenville | Bob Eaton; 12,661; 24.32% | Gord Brown; 28,447; 54.65% | Steve Armstrong; 7,945; 15.26% | David Lee; 3,003; 5.77% | | Gord Brown |
| Prince Edward—Hastings | Bob Vaughan; 18.034; 31.58% | Daryl Kramp; 27,787; 48.67% | Michael McMahon; 8,474; 14.84% | Joseph Sahadat; 2,386; 4.18% | Tim Hickey (Ind.); 416; 0.73% | Daryl Kramp |
| Renfrew—Nipissing— Pembroke | Don Lindsay; 12,532; 24.16% | Cheryl Gallant; 29,923; 57.69% | Sue McSheffrey; 6,509; 12.55% | Gordon Scott McLeod; 1,605; 3.09% | Paul Kelly (Ind.); 1,304; 2.51% | Cheryl Gallant |
| Stormont—Dundas— South Glengarry | Tom Manley; 13,906; 27.17% | Guy Lauzon; 28,014; 54.73% | Elaine MacDonald; 6,892; 13.46% | Doug Beards; 1,713; 3.35% | Carson Chisholm (CHP); 663; 1.30% | Guy Lauzon |

=== Central Ontario ===
| Electoral district | Candidates | | | | | Incumbent |
| Electoral district | Liberal | Conservative | NDP | Green | Other | Incumbent |
|---|---|---|---|---|---|---|
| Barrie | **Aileen Carroll**; 22,456; 39.18% | Patrick Brown; 23,999; 41.88% | Peter Bursztyn; 6,978; 12.18% | Erich Jacoby-Hawkins; 3,875; 6.76% | | **Aileen Carroll** |
| Bruce—Grey—Owen Sound | Verona Jackson; 14,378; 27.56% | Larry Miller; 25,133; 48.18% | Jill McIllwraith; 5,918; 11.34% | Shane Jolley; 6,735; 12.91% | | Larry Miller |
| Dufferin—Caledon | Garry Moore; 14,777; 29.97% | David Tilson; 23,641; 47.94% | Chris Marquis; 5,983; 12.13% | Ted Alexander; 4,912; 9.96% | | David Tilson |
| Durham | Doug Moffatt; 17,290; 30.01% | Bev Oda; 27,087; 47.02% | Bruce Rogers; 9,946; 17.26% | Virginia Ervin; 2,676; 4.64% | Henry Zekveld (CHP); 612; 1.06% | Bev Oda |
| Haliburton—Kawartha Lakes—Brock | Greg Walling; 17,266; 28.75% | Barry Devolin; 29,427; 49.00% | Anne MacDermid; 10,340; 17.22% | Andy Harjula; 3,017; 5.02% | | Barry Devolin |
| Newmarket—Aurora | **Belinda Stronach**; 27,176; 46.21% | Lois Brown; 22,376; 38.05% | Ed Chudak; 5,639; 9.59% | Glenn Hubbers; 2,813; 4.78% | Dorian Baxter (PC); 729 1.24% | **Belinda Stronach** |
| Newmarket—Aurora | **Belinda Stronach**; 27,176; 46.21% | Lois Brown; 22,376; 38.05% | Ed Chudak; 5,639; 9.59% | Glenn Hubbers; 2,813; 4.78% | Peter Maloney (CAP); 79 0.13% | **Belinda Stronach** |
| Northumberland—Quinte West | Paul Macklin; 22,566; 36.00% | Rick Norlock; 25,833; 41.21% | Russ Christianson; 11,334; 18.08% | Patricia Lawson; 2,946; 4.70% | | Paul Macklin |
| Peterborough | Diane Lloyd; 20,532; 32.37% | Dean Del Mastro; 22,774; 35.90% | Linda Slavin; 16,286; 25.68% | Brent Wood; 3,205; 5.05% | Bob Bowers (Ind.); 179 0.28% | Peter Adams† |
| Peterborough | Diane Lloyd; 20,532; 32.37% | Dean Del Mastro; 22,774; 35.90% | Linda Slavin; 16,286; 25.68% | Brent Wood; 3,205; 5.05% | Aiden Wiechula (Mar.); 455 0.72% | Peter Adams† |
| Simcoe—Grey | Elizabeth Kirley; 18,689; 30.86% | Helena Guergis; 30,135; 49.76% | Katy Austin; 6,784; 11.20% | Peter Ellis; 3,372; 5.57% | Peter Vander Zaag (CHP); 1,585; 2.62% | Helena Guergis |
| Simcoe North | Karen Graham; 22,078; 38.37% | Bruce Stanton; 23,266; 40.43% | Jen Hill; 8,132; 14.13% | Sandy Agnew; 3,451; 6.00% | Adrian Peter Kooger (CHP); 617; 1.07% | Paul DeVillers† |
| York—Simcoe | Kate Wilson; 16,456; 30.70% | Peter Van Loan; 25,685; 47.93% | Sylvia Gerl; 7,139; 13.32% | John Dewar; 3,719; 6.94% | Vicki Gunn (CHP); 595; 1.11% | Peter Van Loan |

=== Southern Durham and York ===
| Electoral district | Candidates | | | | | Incumbent |
| Electoral district | Liberal | Conservative | NDP | Green | Other | Incumbent |
|---|---|---|---|---|---|---|
| Ajax—Pickering | Mark Holland; 25,636; 49.38% | Rondo Thomas; 16,992; 32.73% | Kevin Modeste; 6,655; 12.82% | Russell Korus; 2,199; 4.24% | Kevin Norng (CHP); 435; 0.84% | Mark Holland |
| Markham—Unionville | **John McCallum**; 32,769; 61.89% | Joe Li; 14,153; 26.73% | Janice Hagan; 4,257; 8.04% | Wesley Weese; 1,146; 2.16% | Fayaz Choudhary (PC); 321 0.61% | **John McCallum** |
| Markham—Unionville | **John McCallum**; 32,769; 61.89% | Joe Li; 14,153; 26.73% | Janice Hagan; 4,257; 8.04% | Wesley Weese; 1,146; 2.16% | Partap Dua (Ind.); 297 0.56% | **John McCallum** |
| Oak Ridges—Markham | Lui Temelkovski; 35,083; 47.06% | Bob Callow; 28,683; 38.47% | Pamela Courtout; 7,367; 9.88% | Steve Armes; 3,423; 4.59% | | Lui Temelkovski |
| Oshawa | Louise Parkes; 12,831; 23.98% | Colin Carrie; 20,657; 38.61% | Sid Ryan; 17,905; 33.47% | Adam Jobse; 2,019; 3.77% | David Gershuny (M-L); 91; 0.17% | Colin Carrie |
| Pickering— Scarborough East | Dan McTeague; 27,719; 52.68% | Tim Dobson; 16,693; 31.73% | Gary Dale; 6,090; 11.57% | Jeff Brownridge; 1,869; 3.55% | Pedro Gonsalves (Ind.); 176 0.33% | Dan McTeague |
| Pickering— Scarborough East | Dan McTeague; 27,719; 52.68% | Tim Dobson; 16,693; 31.73% | Gary Dale; 6,090; 11.57% | Jeff Brownridge; 1,869; 3.55% | Chai Kalevar (CAP); 70 0.13% | Dan McTeague |
| Richmond Hill | Bryon Wilfert; 27,837; 53.58% | Joe Di Paola; 16,564; 31.88% | Wess Dowsett; 5,176; 9.96% | Tim Rudkins; 2,379; 4.58% | | Bryon Wilfert |
| Thornhill | Susan Kadis; 29,934; 53.10% | Anthony Reale; 19,005; 33.71% | Simon Strelchik; 4,405; 7.81% | Lloyd Helferty; 1,934; 3.43% | Mark Abramowitz (PC); 1,094; 1.94% | Susan Kadis |
| Vaughan | Maurizio Bevilacqua; 36,968; 59.72% | Richard Majkot; 16,124; 26.05% | Yurgo Alexopoulos; 5,114; 8.26% | Adrian Visentin; 3,004; 4.85% | Paolo Fabrizio (Libert.); 688; 1.11% | Maurizio Bevilacqua |
| Whitby—Oshawa | Judi Longfield; 25,882; 38.75% | Jim Flaherty; 29,294; 43.86% | Maret Sadem-Thompson; 8,716; 13.05% | Ajay Krishnan; 2,407; 3.60% | Tom Cochrane (CAP); 217 0.32% | Judi Longfield |
| Whitby—Oshawa | Judi Longfield; 25,882; 38.75% | Jim Flaherty; 29,294; 43.86% | Maret Sadem-Thompson; 8,716; 13.05% | Ajay Krishnan; 2,407; 3.60% | Marty Gobin (Libert.); 274 0.41% | Judi Longfield |

=== Suburban Toronto ===
| Electoral district | Candidates | | | | | Incumbent |
| Electoral district | Liberal | Conservative | NDP | Green | Other | Incumbent |
|---|---|---|---|---|---|---|
| Don Valley East | Yasmin Ratansi; 23,441; 54.00% | Eugene McDermott; 12,661; 29.16% | Richard Alan Hennick; 5,597; 12.89% | Wayne Clements; 1,714; 3.95% | | Yasmin Ratansi |
| Etobicoke Centre | Borys Wrzesnewskyj; 29,509; 52.44% | Axel Kuhn; 18,702; 33.24% | Cynthia Cameron; 5,426; 9.64% | John Vanderheyden; 2,111; 3.75% | Norman Dundas (PC); 402 0.71% | Borys Wrzesnewskyj |
| Etobicoke Centre | Borys Wrzesnewskyj; 29,509; 52.44% | Axel Kuhn; 18,702; 33.24% | Cynthia Cameron; 5,426; 9.64% | John Vanderheyden; 2,111; 3.75% | France Tremblay (M-L); 117 0.21% | Borys Wrzesnewskyj |
| Etobicoke— Lakeshore | Michael Ignatieff; 24,337; 43.63% | John Capobianco; 19,613; 35.16% | Liam McHugh-Russell; 8,685; 15.57% | Philip Ridge; 2,853; 5.11% | Cathy Holliday (Comm.); 186 0.33% | Jean Augustine† |
| Etobicoke— Lakeshore | Michael Ignatieff; 24,337; 43.63% | John Capobianco; 19,613; 35.16% | Liam McHugh-Russell; 8,685; 15.57% | Philip Ridge; 2,853; 5.11% | Janice Murray (M-L); 104 0.19% | Jean Augustine† |
| Etobicoke North | Roy Cullen; 22,195; 61.62% | Amanjit Singh Khroad; 8,049; 22.35% | Ali Naqvi; 3,820; 10.61% | George Jan Havlovic; 950; 2.64% | Alexander T. Bussmann (PC); 526 1.46% | Roy Cullen |
| Etobicoke North | Roy Cullen; 22,195; 61.62% | Amanjit Singh Khroad; 8,049; 22.35% | Ali Naqvi; 3,820; 10.61% | George Jan Havlovic; 950; 2.64% | Anna Di Carlo (M-L); 205 0.57% | Roy Cullen |
| Etobicoke North | Roy Cullen; 22,195; 61.62% | Amanjit Singh Khroad; 8,049; 22.35% | Ali Naqvi; 3,820; 10.61% | George Jan Havlovic; 950; 2.64% | George Szebik (Ind.); 273 0.76% | Roy Cullen |
| Scarborough— Agincourt | Jim Karygiannis; 28,065; 62.59% | Bill Redwood; 10,684; 23.83% | David Robertson; 4,969; 11.08% | Casey Maple; 1,120; 2.50% | | Jim Karygiannis |
| Scarborough Centre | John Cannis; 23,332; 55.38% | Roxanne James; 11,522; 27.35% | Dorothy Laxton; 5,884; 13.96% | Andrew Strachan; 1,396; 3.31% | | John Cannis |
| Scarborough— Guildwood | John McKay; 21,877; 53.26% | Pauline Browes; 11,790; 28.70% | Peter Campbell; 5,847; 14.23% | Mike Flanagan; 1,235; 3.01% | Farooq Khan (Ind.); 150 0.37% | John McKay |
| Scarborough— Guildwood | John McKay; 21,877; 53.26% | Pauline Browes; 11,790; 28.70% | Peter Campbell; 5,847; 14.23% | Mike Flanagan; 1,235; 3.01% | Andrew C. Thomas (Ind.); 82 0.20% | John McKay |
| Scarborough— Guildwood | John McKay; 21,877; 53.26% | Pauline Browes; 11,790; 28.70% | Peter Campbell; 5,847; 14.23% | Mike Flanagan; 1,235; 3.01% | Brenda Thompson (CAP); 98 0.24% | John McKay |
| Scarborough— Rouge River | Derek Lee; 30,285; 65.62% | Jerry Bance; 9,432; 20.44% | Andrew Brett; 4,972; 10.77% | Serge Abbat; 754; 1.63% | Yaqoob Khan (Ind.); 467 1.01% | Derek Lee |
| Scarborough— Rouge River | Derek Lee; 30,285; 65.62% | Jerry Bance; 9,432; 20.44% | Andrew Brett; 4,972; 10.77% | Serge Abbat; 754; 1.63% | Alan Mercer (Libert.); 243 0.53% | Derek Lee |
| Scarborough Southwest | Tom Wappel; 19,930; 47.83% | Vincent Veerasuntharam; 10,017; 24.04% | Dan Harris; 9,626; 23.10% | Valery Philip; 1,827; 4.38% | Elizabeth Rowley (Comm.); 120 0.29% | Tom Wappel |
| Scarborough Southwest | Tom Wappel; 19,930; 47.83% | Vincent Veerasuntharam; 10,017; 24.04% | Dan Harris; 9,626; 23.10% | Valery Philip; 1,827; 4.38% | Trevor Sutton (Ind.); 147 0.35% | Tom Wappel |
| Willowdale | **Jim Peterson**; 30,623; 55.23% | Jovan Boseovski; 16,254; 29.32% | Rochelle Carnegie; 6,297; 11.36% | Sharolyn Vettese; 2,268; 4.09% | | **Jim Peterson** |
| York Centre | **Ken Dryden**; 22,468; 52.66% | Michael Mostyn; 12,828; 30.06% | Marco Iacampo; 5,813; 13.62% | Constantine Kritsonis; 1,560; 3.66% | | **Ken Dryden** |
| York West | Judy Sgro; 21,418; 63.78% | Parm Gill; 6,244; 18.59% | Sandra Romano Anthony; 4,724; 14.07% | Nick Capra; 1,002; 2.98% | Axcel Cocon (Ind.); 192; 0.57% | Judy Sgro |

=== Central Toronto ===
| Electoral district | Candidates | | | | | | Incumbent |
| Electoral district | Liberal | Conservative | NDP | Green | Marxist-Leninist | Other | Incumbent |
|---|---|---|---|---|---|---|---|
| Beaches—East York | Maria Minna; 20,678; 40.39% | Peter Conroy; 9,238; 18.04% | Marilyn Churley; 17,900; 34.96% | **Jim Harris**; 3,106; 6.07% | Roger Carter; 91; 0.18% | Jim Love (PC); 183; 0.36% | Maria Minna |
| Davenport | Mario Silva; 20,172; 51.87% | Theresa Rodrigues; 4,202; 10.80% | Gord Perks; 12,681; 32.61% | Mark O'Brien; 1,440; 3.70% | Sarah Thompson; 103; 0.26% | **Miguel Figueroa** (Comm.); 172 0.44% | Mario Silva |
| Davenport | Mario Silva; 20,172; 51.87% | Theresa Rodrigues; 4,202; 10.80% | Gord Perks; 12,681; 32.61% | Mark O'Brien; 1,440; 3.70% | Sarah Thompson; 103; 0.26% | Wendy Forrest (CAP); 122 0.31% | Mario Silva |
| Don Valley West | **John Godfrey**; 28,709; 53.36% | John Carmichael; 17,908; 33.29% | David Thomas; 4,902; 9.11% | Daphne So; 1,906; 3.54% | | Paul Barnes (CAP); 151 0.28% | **John Godfrey** |
| Don Valley West | **John Godfrey**; 28,709; 53.36% | John Carmichael; 17,908; 33.29% | David Thomas; 4,902; 9.11% | Daphne So; 1,906; 3.54% | | Soumen Deb (Libert.); 226 0.42% | **John Godfrey** |
| Eglinton—Lawrence | **Joe Volpe**; 26,044; 52.89% | Peter Coy; 14,897; 30.25% | Maurganne Mooney; 5,660; 11.49% | Patrick Metzger; 2,520; 5.12% | | John Brian Steele (NA); 123; 0.25% | **Joe Volpe** |
| Parkdale—High Park | Sarmite Sam Bulte; 18,489; 35.94% | Jurij Klufas; 8,777; 17.06% | Peggy Nash; 20,790; 40.41% | Robert L. Rishchynski; 2,840; 5.52% | Lorne Gershuny; 124; 0.24% | Beverly Bernardo (NA); 119 0.23% | Sarmite Bulte |
| Parkdale—High Park | Sarmite Sam Bulte; 18,489; 35.94% | Jurij Klufas; 8,777; 17.06% | Peggy Nash; 20,790; 40.41% | Robert L. Rishchynski; 2,840; 5.52% | Lorne Gershuny; 124; 0.24% | Terry Parker (Mar.); 311 0.60% | Sarmite Bulte |
| St. Paul's | **Carolyn Bennett**; 29,295; 50.26% | Peter Kent; 15,021; 25.77% | Paul Summerville; 11,189; 19.20% | Kevin Farmer; 2,785; 4.78% | | | **Carolyn Bennett** |
| Toronto Centre | **Bill Graham**; 30,874; 52.23% | Lewis Reford; 10,763; 18.21% | Michael Shapcott; 14,036; 23.74% | Chris Tindal; 3,080; 5.21% | Philip Fernandez; 66; 0.11% | Johan Boyden (Comm.); 120 0.20% | **Bill Graham** |
| Toronto Centre | **Bill Graham**; 30,874; 52.23% | Lewis Reford; 10,763; 18.21% | Michael Shapcott; 14,036; 23.74% | Chris Tindal; 3,080; 5.21% | Philip Fernandez; 66; 0.11% | Michel Prairie (NA); 101 0.17% | **Bill Graham** |
| Toronto Centre | **Bill Graham**; 30,874; 52.23% | Lewis Reford; 10,763; 18.21% | Michael Shapcott; 14,036; 23.74% | Chris Tindal; 3,080; 5.21% | Philip Fernandez; 66; 0.11% | **Liz White** (AAEVP); 72 0.12% | **Bill Graham** |
| Toronto—Danforth | Deborah Coyne; 17,256; 34.23% | Kren Clausen; 4,992; 9.90% | **Jack Layton**; 24,412; 48.42% | Al Hart; 3,583; 7.11% | Marcell Rodden; 172; 0.34% | | **Jack Layton** |
| Trinity—Spadina | **Tony Ianno**; 25,067; 40.14% | Sam Goldstein; 5,625; 9.01% | Olivia Chow; 28,748; 46.03% | Thom Chapman; 2,398; 3.84% | Nick Lin; 138; 0.22% | Asif Hossain (PC); 392 0.63% | **Tony Ianno** |
| Trinity—Spadina | **Tony Ianno**; 25,067; 40.14% | Sam Goldstein; 5,625; 9.01% | Olivia Chow; 28,748; 46.03% | Thom Chapman; 2,398; 3.84% | Nick Lin; 138; 0.22% | John Riddell (CAP); 82 0.13% | **Tony Ianno** |
| York South—Weston | Alan Tonks; 22,871; 57.06% | Steve Halicki; 6,991; 17.44% | Paul Ferreira; 8,525; 21.27% | Maria De Angelis-Pater; 1,506; 3.76% | | Dragan Cimesa (Ind.); 189; 0.47% | Alan Tonks |

=== Brampton, Mississauga and Oakville ===
| Electoral district | Candidates | | | | | Incumbent |
| Electoral district | Liberal | Conservative | NDP | Green | Other | Incumbent |
|---|---|---|---|---|---|---|
| Bramalea—Gore—Malton | Gurbax S. Malhi; 25,348; 50.68% | John Sprovieri; 16,367; 32.73% | Cesar Martello; 6,343; 12.68% | Ernst Braendli; 1,721; 3.44% | Frank Chilelli (M-L); 233; 0.47% | Gurbax Malhi |
| Brampton—Springdale | Ruby Dhalla; 22,294; 47.34% | Sam Hundal; 14,492; 30.77% | Anna Mather; 8,345; 17.72% | Ian Raymond Chiocchio; 1,853; 3.93% | Upali Jinadasa Wannaku Rallage (Comm.); 110; 0.23% | Ruby Dhalla |
| Brampton West | Colleen Beaumier; 27,988; 49.12% | Bal Gosal; 20,345; 35.70% | Jagtar Singh Shergill; 6,310; 11.07% | Jaipaul Massey-Singh; 2,340; 4.11% | | Colleen Beaumier |
| Mississauga—Brampton South | Navdeep Bains; 27,370; 53.94% | Arnjeet Sangha; 15,605; 30.75% | Nirvan Balkissoon; 5,521; 10.88% | Grace Yogaretnam; 1,927; 3.80% | Tim Sullivan (M-L); 319; 0.63% | Navdeep Bains |
| Mississauga East—Cooksville | **Albina Guarnieri**; 23,530; 51.65% | Carl DeFaria; 14,326; 31.45% | Jim Gill; 5,180; 11.37% | Rich Pietro; 1,393; 3.06% | Pierre Chénier (M-L); 164 0.36% | **Albina Guarnieri** |
| Mississauga East—Cooksville | **Albina Guarnieri**; 23,530; 51.65% | Carl DeFaria; 14,326; 31.45% | Jim Gill; 5,180; 11.37% | Rich Pietro; 1,393; 3.06% | Mohamed Elrofaie (Ind.); 496 1.09% | **Albina Guarnieri** |
| Mississauga East—Cooksville | **Albina Guarnieri**; 23,530; 51.65% | Carl DeFaria; 14,326; 31.45% | Jim Gill; 5,180; 11.37% | Rich Pietro; 1,393; 3.06% | Sally Wong (CHP); 467 1.03% | **Albina Guarnieri** |
| Mississauga—Erindale | Omar Alghabra; 26,852; 44.81% | Bob Dechert; 23,524; 39.26% | Rupinder Brar; 6,644; 11.09% | Adam Hunter; 2,613; 4.36% | Ronnie Amyotte (Ind.); 289; 0.48% | Carolyn Parrish (Note: Elected as a Liberal in the 2004 Election, Carolyn Parrish was excluded from the Liberal caucus in November 2004.) |
| Mississauga South | Paul Szabo; 23,018; 44.17% | Phil Green; 20,888; 40.09% | Mark de Pelham; 5,607; 10.76% | Brendan Tarry; 2,393; 4.59% | Paul D.J. McMurray (CAP); 129 0.25% | Paul Szabo |
| Mississauga South | Paul Szabo; 23,018; 44.17% | Phil Green; 20,888; 40.09% | Mark de Pelham; 5,607; 10.76% | Brendan Tarry; 2,393; 4.59% | Dagmar Sullivan (M-L); 74 0.14% | Paul Szabo |
| Mississauga—Streetsville | Wajid Khan; 23,913; 45.95% | Raminder Gill; 18,121; 34.82% | James Caron; 6,929; 13.31% | Otto Casanova; 2,334; 4.48% | Peter Creighton (PC); 747; 1.44% | Wajid Khan |
| Oakville | M. A. Bonnie Brown; 25,892; 43.35% | Terence Young; 25,148; 42.10% | Tina Agrell; 5,815; 9.74% | Laura Domsy; 2,872; 4.81% | | Bonnie Brown |

=== Hamilton, Burlington and Niagara ===
| Electoral district | Candidates | | | | | Incumbent |
| Electoral district | Liberal | Conservative | NDP | Green | Other | Incumbent |
|---|---|---|---|---|---|---|
| Ancaster—Dundas— Flamborough—Westdale | Russ Powers; 21,656; 34.51% | David Sweet; 24,530; 39.10% | Gordon Guyatt; 13,376; 21.32% | David Januczkowski; 2,767; 4.41% | Ben Cowie (Ind.); 303 0.48% | Russ Powers |
| Ancaster—Dundas— Flamborough—Westdale | Russ Powers; 21,656; 34.51% | David Sweet; 24,530; 39.10% | Gordon Guyatt; 13,376; 21.32% | David Januczkowski; 2,767; 4.41% | Jamilé Ghaddar (M-L); 112 0.18% | Russ Powers |
| Burlington | Paddy Torsney; 25,431; 39.11% | Mike Wallace; 28,030; 43.11% | David Laird; 8,090; 12.44% | Rick Goldring; 3,471; 5.34% | | Paddy Torsney |
| Halton | Gary Carr; 28,680; 41.44% | Garth Turner; 30,577; 44.18% | Anwar Naqvi; 6,114; 8.83% | Kyle Grice; 3,843; 5.55% | | Gary Carr |
| Hamilton Centre | Javid Mirza; 11,224; 23.49% | Eliot Lewis Hill; 9,696; 20.29% | David Christopherson; 24,503; 51.29% | John Livingstone; 2,022; 4.23% | Tony Des Lauriers (CAP); 332; 0.69% | David Christopherson |
| Hamilton East—Stoney Creek | **Tony Valeri**; 18,880; 35.16% | Frank Rukavina; 13,581; 25.29% | Wayne Marston; 19,346; 36.03% | Jo Pavlov; 1,573; 2.93% | Bob Mann (Comm.); 316; 0.59% | **Tony Valeri** |
| Hamilton Mountain | Bill Kelly; 18,704; 31.87% | Don Graves; 15,915; 27.11% | Chris Charlton; 21,970; 37.43% | Susan Wadsworth; 1,517; 2.58% | Stephen Downey (CHP); 458 0.78% | Beth Phinney† |
| Hamilton Mountain | Bill Kelly; 18,704; 31.87% | Don Graves; 15,915; 27.11% | Chris Charlton; 21,970; 37.43% | Susan Wadsworth; 1,517; 2.58% | Paul Lane (M-L); 132 0.22% | Beth Phinney† |
| Niagara Falls | Gary Burroughs; 20,092; 34.53% | Rob Nicholson; 23,485; 40.36% | Wayne Gates; 12,209; 20.98% | Kay Green; 2,402; 4.13% | | Rob Nicholson |
| Niagara West—Glanbrook | Heather Carter; 17,712; 30.68% | Dean Allison; 27,351; 47.38% | Dave Heatley; 9,251; 16.02% | Tom Ferguson; 2,284; 3.96% | David W. Bylsma (CHP); 1,132; 1.96% | Dean Allison |
| St. Catharines | Walt Lastewka; 21,423; 37.05% | Richard Dykstra; 21,669; 37.47% | Jeff Burch; 11,848; 20.49% | Jim Fannon; 2,305; 3.99% | Bill Bylsma (CHP); 481 0.83% | Walt Lastewka |
| St. Catharines | Walt Lastewka; 21,423; 37.05% | Richard Dykstra; 21,669; 37.47% | Jeff Burch; 11,848; 20.49% | Jim Fannon; 2,305; 3.99% | Elaine Couto (M-L); 101 0.17% | Walt Lastewka |
| Welland | John Maloney; 20,267; 35.53% | Mel Grunstein; 16,678; 29.23% | Jody Di Bartolomeo; 17,492; 30.66% | Brian Simpson; 1,960; 3.44% | Irma Ruiter (CHP); 539 0.94% | John Maloney |
| Welland | John Maloney; 20,267; 35.53% | Mel Grunstein; 16,678; 29.23% | Jody Di Bartolomeo; 17,492; 30.66% | Brian Simpson; 1,960; 3.44% | Ron Walker (M-L); 113 0.20% | John Maloney |

=== Midwestern Ontario ===
| Electoral district | Candidates | | | | | | Incumbent |
| Electoral district | Liberal | Conservative | NDP | Green | Christian Heritage | Other | Incumbent |
|---|---|---|---|---|---|---|---|
| Brant | Lloyd St. Amand; 22,077; 36.95% | Phil McColeman; 21,495; 35.97% | Lynn Bowering; 12,713; 21.28% | Adam King; 2,729; 4.57% | John H. Wubs; 526; 0.88% | John C. Turmel (Ind.); 213; 0.36% | Lloyd St. Amand |
| Cambridge | Janko Peric; 19,419; 33.61% | Gary Goodyear; 25,337; 43.85% | Donna Reid; 9,794; 16.95% | Gareth White; 3,017; 5.22% | | David M. Pelly (CAP); 217; 0.38% | Gary Goodyear |
| Guelph | Brenda Chamberlain; 23,662; 38.39% | Brent Barr; 18,342; 29.76% | Phil Allt; 13,561; 22.00% | Mike Nagy; 5,376; 8.72% | Peter Ellis; 538; 0.87% | Manuel Couto (M–L); 45 0.07% | Brenda Chamberlain |
| Guelph | Brenda Chamberlain; 23,662; 38.39% | Brent Barr; 18,342; 29.76% | Phil Allt; 13,561; 22.00% | Mike Nagy; 5,376; 8.72% | Peter Ellis; 538; 0.87% | Scott Gilbert (Comm.); 111 0.18% | Brenda Chamberlain |
| Haldimand—Norfolk | Bob Speller; 18,363; 34.29% | Diane Finley; 25,885; 48.33% | Valya Roberts; 6,858; 12.80% | Carolyn Van Nort; 1,894; 3.54% | Steven Elgersma; 559; 1.04% | | Diane Finley |
| Huron—Bruce | Paul Steckle; 21,260; 39.84% | Ben Lobb; 20,289; 38.02% | Grant Robertson; 8,696; 16.30% | Victoria Serda; 1,829; 3.43% | Dave Joslin; 1,019; 1.91% | Dennis Valenta (Ind.); 270; 0.51% | Paul Steckle |
| Kitchener Centre | Karen Redman; 21,714; 43.26% | Steven Cage; 16,131; 32.14% | Richard Walsh-Bowers; 9,253; 18.43% | Tony Maas; 2,822; 5.62% | | Martin Suter (Comm.); 274; 0.55% | Karen Redman |
| Kitchener—Conestoga | Lynn Myers; 19,246; 38.48% | Harold Glenn Albrecht; 20,615; 41.22% | Len Carter; 7,445; 14.89% | Kristine Yvonne Stapleton; 2,706; 5.41% | | | Lynn Myers |
| Kitchener—Waterloo | Andrew Telegdi; 31,136; 46.85% | Ajmer Mandur; 18,817; 28.31% | Edwin Laryea; 11,889; 17.89% | Pauline Richards; 4,298; 6.47% | | Julian Ichim (M–L); 144 0.22% | Andrew Telegdi |
| Kitchener—Waterloo | Andrew Telegdi; 31,136; 46.85% | Ajmer Mandur; 18,817; 28.31% | Edwin Laryea; 11,889; 17.89% | Pauline Richards; 4,298; 6.47% | | Ciprian Mihalcea (Ind.); 173 0.26% | Andrew Telegdi |
| Oxford | Greig Mordue; 13,961; 28.08% | Dave MacKenzie; 23,140; 46.55% | Zoé Kunschner; 8,639; 17.38% | Ronnee Sykes; 1,566; 3.15% | John Markus; 1,434; 2.88% | James Bender (Mar.); 771 1.55% | Dave MacKenzie |
| Oxford | Greig Mordue; 13,961; 28.08% | Dave MacKenzie; 23,140; 46.55% | Zoé Kunschner; 8,639; 17.38% | Ronnee Sykes; 1,566; 3.15% | John Markus; 1,434; 2.88% | Kaye Sargent (Libert.); 204 0.41% | Dave MacKenzie |
| Perth Wellington | David Cunningham; 12,301; 25.79% | Gary Schellenberger; 22,004; 46.14% | Keith Dinicol; 8,876; 18.61% | John Day Cowling; 3,117; 6.54% | Irma DeVries; 1,396; 2.93% | | Gary Schellenberger |
| Wellington—Halton Hills | Rod Finnie; 16,065; 29.17% | Michael Chong; 27,907; 50.67% | Noel Paul Duignan; 6,785; 12.32% | Brent Bouteiller; 3,362; 6.10% | Carol Ann Krusky; 606; 1.10% | Mike Wisniewski (Ind.); 355; 0.64% | Michael Chong |

=== Southwestern Ontario ===
| Electoral district | Candidates | | | | | | Incumbent |
| Electoral district | Liberal | Conservative | NDP | Green | Marxist-Leninist | Other | Incumbent |
|---|---|---|---|---|---|---|---|
| Chatham-Kent—Essex | Jim Comiskey; 15,204; 31.26% | Dave Van Kesteren; 20,820; 42.81% | Kathleen Kevany; 10,875; 22.36% | Ken Bell; 1,737; 3.57% | | | Jerry Pickard† |
| Elgin—Middlesex—London | Crispin Colvin; 13,517; 26.34% | Joe Preston; 23,416; 45.62% | Tim McCallum; 9,873; 19.24% | Jonathan Martyn; 2,873; 5.60% | | Will Arlow (CAP); 105 0.20% | Joe Preston |
| Elgin—Middlesex—London | Crispin Colvin; 13,517; 26.34% | Joe Preston; 23,416; 45.62% | Tim McCallum; 9,873; 19.24% | Jonathan Martyn; 2,873; 5.60% | | Phill Borm (PC); 504 0.98% | Joe Preston |
| Elgin—Middlesex—London | Crispin Colvin; 13,517; 26.34% | Joe Preston; 23,416; 45.62% | Tim McCallum; 9,873; 19.24% | Jonathan Martyn; 2,873; 5.60% | | Ken DeVries (CHP); 1,039 2.02% | Joe Preston |
| Essex | Susan Whelan; 19,510; 34.08% | Jeff Watson; 23,125; 40.40% | Taras Natyshak; 12,993; 22.70% | James McVeity; 1,507; 2.63% | Bob Cruise; 108; 0.19% | | Jeff Watson |
| Lambton—Kent—Middlesex | Jeff Wesley; 16,835; 31.01% | Bev Shipley; 25,170; 46.36% | Kevin Blake; 9,330; 17.19% | Jim Johnston; 2,156; 3.97% | | Mike Janssens (CHP); 797; 1.47% | Rose-Marie Ur† |
| London—Fanshawe | Glen Douglas Pearson; 15,199; 32.64% | Dan Mailer; 13,495; 28.98% | Irene Mathyssen; 16,067; 34.51% | David McLaughlin; 1,803; 3.87% | | | Pat O'Brien† |
| London North Centre | **Joe Fontana**; 24,109; 40.12% | John Mazzilli; 17,968; 29.90% | Stephen Maynard; 14,271; 23.75% | Stuart Smith; 3,300; 5.49% | Margaret Mondaca; 160; 0.27% | Rod Morley (PC); 283; 0.47% | **Joe Fontana** |
| London West | Sue Barnes; 23,019; 37.70% | Al Gretzky; 21,690; 35.53% | Gina Barber; 13,056; 21.39% | Monica Jarabek; 2,900; 4.75% | Margaret Villamizar; 59; 0.10% | Steve Hunter (PC); 328; 0.54% | Sue Barnes |
| Sarnia—Lambton | Roger Gallaway; 17,649; 33.11% | Pat Davidson; 21,841; 40.98% | Greg Agar; 10,673; 20.02% | Mike Jacobs; 1,712; 3.21% | | Gary De Boer (CHP); 1,108 2.08% | Roger Gallaway |
| Sarnia—Lambton | Roger Gallaway; 17,649; 33.11% | Pat Davidson; 21,841; 40.98% | Greg Agar; 10,673; 20.02% | Mike Jacobs; 1,712; 3.21% | | John Elliott (Ind.); 316 0.59% | Roger Gallaway |
| Windsor—Tecumseh | Bruck Easton; 13,413; 26.43% | Rick Fuschi; 12,851; 25.32% | Joe Comartin; 22,646; 44.63% | Catherine Pluard; 1,644; 3.24% | Laura Chesnik; 193; 0.38% | | Joe Comartin |
| Windsor West | Werner Keller; 12,110; 25.39% | Al Teshuba; 9,592; 20.11% | Brian Masse; 23,608; 49.49% | Jillana Bishop; 1,444; 3.03% | Enver Villamizar; 108; 0.23% | Chris Schnurr (PC); 614 1.29% | Brian Masse |
| Windsor West | Werner Keller; 12,110; 25.39% | Al Teshuba; 9,592; 20.11% | Brian Masse; 23,608; 49.49% | Jillana Bishop; 1,444; 3.03% | Enver Villamizar; 108; 0.23% | Habib Zaidi (Ind.); 224 0.47% | Brian Masse |

=== Northern Ontario ===
| Electoral district | Candidates | | | | | Incumbent |
| Electoral district | Liberal | Conservative | NDP | Green | Other | Incumbent |
|---|---|---|---|---|---|---|
| Algoma—Manitoulin— Kapuskasing | Brent St. Denis; 14,652; 38.18% | Ian West; 8,957; 23.34% | Carol Hughes; 13,244; 34.51% | Sarah Hutchinson; 1,025; 2.67% | Will Morin (FPNP); 338 0.88% | Brent St. Denis |
| Algoma—Manitoulin— Kapuskasing | Brent St. Denis; 14,652; 38.18% | Ian West; 8,957; 23.34% | Carol Hughes; 13,244; 34.51% | Sarah Hutchinson; 1,025; 2.67% | Donald Milton Polmateer (Ind.); 164 0.43% | Brent St. Denis |
| Kenora | Roger Valley; 9,937; 36.52% | Bill Brown; 8,434; 30.99% | Susan Barclay; 8,149; 29.95% | Dave Vasey; 692; 2.54% | | Roger Valley |
| Nickel Belt | Raymond Bonin; 19,775; 43.31% | Margaret Schwartzentruber; 5,732; 12.55% | Claude Gravelle; 17,668; 38.70% | Mark McAllister; 975; 2.14% | Michel D. Ethier (Mar.); 421 0.92% | Raymond Bonin |
| Nickel Belt | Raymond Bonin; 19,775; 43.31% | Margaret Schwartzentruber; 5,732; 12.55% | Claude Gravelle; 17,668; 38.70% | Mark McAllister; 975; 2.14% | Mathieu Péron (PC); 1,044 2.29% | Raymond Bonin |
| Nickel Belt | Raymond Bonin; 19,775; 43.31% | Margaret Schwartzentruber; 5,732; 12.55% | Claude Gravelle; 17,668; 38.70% | Mark McAllister; 975; 2.14% | Steve Rutchinski (M-L); 42 0.09% | Raymond Bonin |
| Nipissing—Timiskaming | Anthony Rota; 21,393; 44.69% | Peter Chirico; 16,511; 34.49% | Dave Fluri; 8,268; 17.27% | Meg Purdy; 1,698; 3.55% | | Anthony Rota |
| Parry Sound-Muskoka | **Andy Mitchell**; 18,485; 40.04% | Tony Clement; 18,513; 40.10% | Jo-Anne Boulding; 5,472; 11.85% | Glen Hodgson; 3,701; 8.02% | | **Andy Mitchell** |
| Sault Ste. Marie | Christian Provenzano; 15,825; 34.22% | Ken Walker; 11,099; 24.00% | Tony Martin; 17,979; 38.88% | Mark Viitala; 1,056; 2.28% | Guy Dumas (FPNP); 225 0.49% | Tony Martin |
| Sault Ste. Marie | Christian Provenzano; 15,825; 34.22% | Ken Walker; 11,099; 24.00% | Tony Martin; 17,979; 38.88% | Mark Viitala; 1,056; 2.28% | Mike Taffarel (M-L); 59 0.13% | Tony Martin |
| Sudbury | Diane Marleau; 19,809; 41.57% | Kevin Serviss; 10,332; 21.68% | Gerry McIntaggart; 15,225; 31.95% | Joey Methé; 1,301; 2.73% | Stephen Butcher (PC); 782 1.64% | Diane Marleau |
| Sudbury | Diane Marleau; 19,809; 41.57% | Kevin Serviss; 10,332; 21.68% | Gerry McIntaggart; 15,225; 31.95% | Joey Methé; 1,301; 2.73% | Sam Hammond (Comm.); 70 0.15% | Diane Marleau |
| Sudbury | Diane Marleau; 19,809; 41.57% | Kevin Serviss; 10,332; 21.68% | Gerry McIntaggart; 15,225; 31.95% | Joey Methé; 1,301; 2.73% | J. David Popescu (Ind.); 54 0.11% | Diane Marleau |
| Sudbury | Diane Marleau; 19,809; 41.57% | Kevin Serviss; 10,332; 21.68% | Gerry McIntaggart; 15,225; 31.95% | Joey Methé; 1,301; 2.73% | Dave Starbuck (M-L); 77 0.16% | Diane Marleau |
| Thunder Bay—Rainy River | Ken Boshcoff; 13,520; 35.13% | David Leskowski; 10,485; 27.25% | John Rafferty; 12,862; 33.42% | Russ Aegard; 1,193; 3.10% | Doug MacKay (Mar.); 424; 1.10% | Ken Boshcoff |
| Thunder Bay— Superior North | Joe Comuzzi; 14,009; 36.01% | Bev Sarafin; 8,578; 22.05% | Bruce Hyer; 13,601; 34.96% | Dawn Kannegiesser; 2,231; 5.73% | Denis A. Carrière (Mar.); 486; 1.25% | Joe Comuzzi |
| Timmins-James Bay | Robert Riopelle; 13,003; 34.26% | Ken Graham; 5,173; 13.63% | Charlie Angus; 19,195; 50.58% | Sahaja Freed; 578; 1.52% | | Charlie Angus |

== Manitoba ==
=== Rural Manitoba ===
| Electoral district | Candidates | | | | | | Incumbent |
| Electoral district | Liberal | Conservative | NDP | Green | Christian Heritage | Other | Incumbent |
|---|---|---|---|---|---|---|---|
| Brandon—Souris | Murray Downing; 6,696; 18.00% | Merv Tweed; 20,247; 54.43% | Bob Senff; 7,528; 20.24% | Brad Bird; 1,707; 4.59% | Colin Atkins; 290; 0.78% | Lisa Gallagher (Comm.); 120 0.32% | Merv Tweed |
| Brandon—Souris | Murray Downing; 6,696; 18.00% | Merv Tweed; 20,247; 54.43% | Bob Senff; 7,528; 20.24% | Brad Bird; 1,707; 4.59% | Colin Atkins; 290; 0.78% | Mike Volek (Ind.); 611 1.64% | Merv Tweed |
| Churchill | Tina Keeper; 10,157; 40.68% | Nazir Ahmad; 2,886; 11.56% | Niki Christina Ashton; 7,093; 28.41% | Jeff Fountain; 401; 1.61% | | Brad Bodnar (Ind.); 146 0.58% | Bev Desjarlais |
| Churchill | Tina Keeper; 10,157; 40.68% | Nazir Ahmad; 2,886; 11.56% | Niki Christina Ashton; 7,093; 28.41% | Jeff Fountain; 401; 1.61% | | Bev Desjarlais (Ind.); 4,283 17.16% | Bev Desjarlais |
| Dauphin—Swan River—Marquette | Don Dewar; 6,171; 18.15% | Inky Mark; 20,084; 59.08% | Walter Kolisnyk; 6,221; 18.30% | Kathy Storey; 1,246; 3.67% | Iris Yawney; 273; 0.80% | | Inky Mark; Dauphin—Swan River |
| Portage—Lisgar | Garry McLean; 4,199; 11.39% | Brian Pallister; 25,719; 69.78% | Daren Van Den Bussche; 4,072; 11.05% | Charlie Howatt; 1,880; 5.10% | David Reimer; 987; 2.68% | | Brian Pallister |
| Provencher | Wes Penner; 6,077; 15.84% | Vic Toews; 25,199; 65.68% | Patrick O'Connor; 5,259; 13.71% | Janine G. Gibson; 1,830; 4.77% | | | Vic Toews |
| Selkirk—Interlake | Bruce Benson; 4,436; 10.03% | James Bezan; 21,661; 48.99% | Ed Schreyer; 16,358; 36.99% | Thomas Alexander Goodman; 1,283; 2.90% | Anthony Eric Barendregt; 204; 0.46% | Duncan E. Geisler (Ind.); 277; 0.63% | James Bezan |

=== Winnipeg ===
| Electoral district | Candidates | | | | | Incumbent |
| Electoral district | Liberal | Conservative | NDP | Green | Other | Incumbent |
|---|---|---|---|---|---|---|
| Charleswood—St. James— Assiniboia | John Loewen; 16,099; 36.37% | Steven Fletcher; 20,791; 46.98% | Dennis Kshyk; 5,669; 12.81% | Mike Johannson; 1,700; 3.84% | | Steven Fletcher |
| Elmwood—Transcona | Tanya Parks; 4,108; 12.31% | Linda West; 10,720; 32.13% | Bill Blaikie; 16,967; 50.85% | Tanja Hutter; 1,211; 3.63% | Robert Scott (CHP); 363; 1.09% | Bill Blaikie |
| Kildonan—St. Paul | Terry Duguid; 13,597; 33.47% | Joy Smith; 17,524; 43.13% | Evelyn Myskiw; 8,193; 20.17% | Colleen Zobel; 1,101; 2.71% | Eduard Hiebert (Ind.); 213; 0.52% | Joy Smith |
| Saint Boniface | Raymond Simard; 16,417; 38.59% | Ken Cooper; 14,893; 35.00% | Mathieu Allard; 9,311; 21.88% | Marc Payette; 1,640; 3.85% | Jane MacDiarmid (CHP); 285; 0.67% | Raymond Simard |
| Winnipeg Centre | Ray St. Germain; 6,940; 24.34% | Helen Sterzer; 5,554; 19.48% | Pat Martin; 13,805; 48.43% | Gary Gervais; 2,010; 7.05% | Anna-Celestrya Carr (Comm.); 199; 0.70% | Pat Martin |
| Winnipeg North | Parmjeet Gill; 5,752; 21.11% | Garreth McDonald; 4,810; 17.65% | Judy Wasylycia-Leis; 15,582; 57.18% | David Carey; 779; 2.86% | Darrell Rankin (Comm.); 123 0.45% | Judy Wasylycia-Leis |
| Winnipeg North | Parmjeet Gill; 5,752; 21.11% | Garreth McDonald; 4,810; 17.65% | Judy Wasylycia-Leis; 15,582; 57.18% | David Carey; 779; 2.86% | Eric Truijen (CHP); 207 0.76% | Judy Wasylycia-Leis |
| Winnipeg South | **Reg Alcock**; 17,217; 41.15% | Rod Bruinooge; 17,328; 41.42% | Robert Page; 5,743; 13.73% | Wesley Owen Whiteside; 1,289; 3.08% | Heidi Loewen-Steffano (CHP); 259; 0.62% | **Reg Alcock** |
| Winnipeg South Centre | Anita Neville; 16,296; 39.25% | Michael Richards; 13,077; 31.49% | Mark Wasyliw; 9,055; 21.81% | Vere H. Scott; 1,848; 4.45% | Jeffrey Anderson (Ind.); 246 0.59% | Anita Neville |
| Winnipeg South Centre | Anita Neville; 16,296; 39.25% | Michael Richards; 13,077; 31.49% | Mark Wasyliw; 9,055; 21.81% | Vere H. Scott; 1,848; 4.45% | Dale Swirsky (PC); 934 2.25% | Anita Neville |
| Winnipeg South Centre | Anita Neville; 16,296; 39.25% | Michael Richards; 13,077; 31.49% | Mark Wasyliw; 9,055; 21.81% | Vere H. Scott; 1,848; 4.45% | Magnus Thompson (CAP); 66 0.16% | Anita Neville |

== Saskatchewan ==
=== Southern Saskatchewan ===
| Electoral district | Candidates | | | | | Incumbent |
| Electoral district | Liberal | Conservative | NDP | Green | Other | Incumbent |
|---|---|---|---|---|---|---|
| Cypress Hills—Grasslands | Bill Caton; 3,885; 12.89% | David Anderson; 20,035; 66.48% | Mike Eason; 5,076; 16.84% | Amanda Knorr; 1,141; 3.79% | | David Anderson |
| Palliser | John Williams; 7,006; 20.20% | Dave Batters; 14,906; 42.99% | Jo-Anne Dusel; 11,460; 33.05% | Larissa Shasko; 1,182; 3.41% | Marcia Fogal (CAP); 121; 0.35% | Dave Batters |
| Regina—Lumsden—Lake Centre | Gary Anderson; 8,956; 26.63% | Tom Lukiwski; 14,176; 42.15% | Moe Kovatch; 9,467; 28.15% | Bill Sorochan; 1,035; 3.08% | | Tom Lukiwski |
| Regina—Qu'Appelle | Allyce Herle; 7,134; 23.05% | Andrew Scheer; 12,753; 41.21% | Lorne Nystrom; 10,041; 32.45% | Brett Dolter; 1,016; 3.28% | | Andrew Scheer |
| Souris—Moose Mountain | Lonny McKague; 5,681; 18.51% | Ed Komarnicki; 19,282; 62.82% | Michael Haukeness; 4,284; 13.96% | Matthew Smith; 1,448; 4.72% | | Ed Komarnicki |
| Wascana | **Ralph Goodale**; 20,666; 51.78% | Brad Farquhar; 11,990; 30.04% | Helen Yum; 5,880; 14.73% | Nigel Taylor; 1,378; 3.45% | | **Ralph Goodale** |
| Yorkton—Melville | Mervin Joseph Cushman; 4,558; 13.95% | Garry Breitkreuz; 20,736; 63.47% | Jason Dennison; 6,165; 18.87% | Keith Neu; 923; 2.83% | Carl Barabonoff (Ind.); 287; 0.88% | Garry Breitkreuz |

=== Northern Saskatchewan ===
| Electoral district | Candidates | | | | | Incumbent |
| Electoral district | Liberal | Conservative | NDP | Green | Other | Incumbent |
|---|---|---|---|---|---|---|
| Battlefords—Lloydminster | Dominic LaPlante; 3,901; 12.77% | Gerry Ritz; 16,491; 53.96% | Elgin Wayne Wyatt; 4,829; 15.80% | Norbert Kratchmer; 637; 2.08% | Jim Pankiw (NA); 4,396 14.38% | Gerry Ritz |
| Battlefords—Lloydminster | Dominic LaPlante; 3,901; 12.77% | Gerry Ritz; 16,491; 53.96% | Elgin Wayne Wyatt; 4,829; 15.80% | Norbert Kratchmer; 637; 2.08% | Harold Stephan (CHP); 306 1.00% | Gerry Ritz |
| Blackstrap | Herta Barron; 6,841; 16.90% | Lynne Yelich; 19,430; 47.99% | Don Kossick; 12,376; 30.57% | Mike Fornssler; 1,334; 3.29% | Sonje Kristtorn (Comm.); 94 0.23% | Lynne Yelich |
| Blackstrap | Herta Barron; 6,841; 16.90% | Lynne Yelich; 19,430; 47.99% | Don Kossick; 12,376; 30.57% | Mike Fornssler; 1,334; 3.29% | D.-Jay Krozser (Ind.); 412 1.02% | Lynne Yelich |
| Desnethé—Missinippi— Churchill River | Gary Merasty; 10,191; 41.37% | Jeremy Harrison; 10,124; 41.09% | Anita Jackson; 3,787; 15.37% | John A. McDonald; 534; 2.17% | | Jeremy Harrison |
| Prince Albert | Patrick Jahn; 6,149; 19.38% | Brian Fitzpatrick; 17,271; 54.44% | Valerie Mushinski; 7,562; 23.84% | Larry Zepp; 744; 2.35% | | Brian Fitzpatrick |
| Saskatoon—Humboldt | Peter Stroh; 6,281; 16.85% | Brad Trost; 18,285; 49.07% | Andrew Mason; 10,975; 29.45% | Mike E. Jones; 1,382; 3.71% | Tim Nyborg (Ind.); 342; 0.92% | Brad Trost |
| Saskatoon—Rosetown—Biggar | Myron Luczka; 3,536; 12.08% | Carol Skelton; 13,331; 45.54% | Nettie Wiebe; 11,412; 38.98% | Rick Barsky; 738; 2.52% | Marcel Bourassa (CHP); 258; 0.88% | Carol Skelton |
| Saskatoon—Wanuskewin | Chris Axworthy; 8,655; 24.08% | Maurice Vellacott; 17,753; 49.39% | Jim Maddin; 7,939; 22.09% | Don Cameron; 1,292; 3.59% | Dale Sanders (CHP); 307; 0.85% | Maurice Vellacott |

== Alberta ==
=== Rural Alberta ===
| Electoral district | Candidates | | | | | Incumbent |
| Electoral district | Liberal | Conservative | NDP | Green | Other | Incumbent |
|---|---|---|---|---|---|---|
| Crowfoot | Adam Campbell; 2,908; 5.56% | Kevin A. Sorenson; 43,210; 82.56% | Ellen Parker; 3,875; 7.40% | Cameron Wigmore; 2,347; 4.48% | | Kevin Sorenson |
| Fort McMurray—Athabasca | Mel H. Buffalo; 4,663; 14.78% | Brian Jean; 20,400; 64.66% | Roland Lefort; 4,602; 14.59% | Ian Hopfe; 1,547; 4.90% | John Malcolm (FPNP); 337; 1.07% | Brian Jean; Athabasca |
| Lethbridge | Michael Cormican; 5,859; 11.25% | Rick Casson; 35,061; 67.30% | Melanee Thomas; 7,135; 13.70% | Andrea Sheridan; 1,846; 3.54% | Howard Fosyth (Ind.); 735 1.41% | Rick Casson |
| Lethbridge | Michael Cormican; 5,859; 11.25% | Rick Casson; 35,061; 67.30% | Melanee Thomas; 7,135; 13.70% | Andrea Sheridan; 1,846; 3.54% | Marc Slingerland (CHP); 1,458 2.80% | Rick Casson |
| Macleod | Bernie Kennedy; 4,596; 9.24% | Ted Menzies; 37,534; 75.45% | Joyce Thomas; 3,251; 6.54% | Larry Ashmore; 3,075; 6.18% | Catherine Whelan Costen (CAP); 235 0.47% | Ted Menzies |
| Macleod | Bernie Kennedy; 4,596; 9.24% | Ted Menzies; 37,534; 75.45% | Joyce Thomas; 3,251; 6.54% | Larry Ashmore; 3,075; 6.18% | Myron Wolf Child (Ind.); 1,055 2.12% | Ted Menzies |
| Medicine Hat | Bev Botter; 3,737; 8.35% | Monte Solberg; 35,670; 79.71% | Wally Regehr; 3,598; 8.04% | Kevin Dodd; 1,746; 3.90% | | Monte Solberg |
| Peace River | Tanya Mary Kappo; 4,573; 9.38% | Chris Warkentin; 27,785; 56.97% | Susan Thompson; 5,427; 11.13% | Zane Lewis; 1,102; 2.26% | Bill Given (Ind.); 9,882; 20.26% | Charlie Penson† |
| Red Deer | Luke Kurata; 4,636; 9.15% | Bob Mills; 38,375; 75.75% | Kelly Bickford; 5,034; 9.94% | Tanner Wade Waldo; 2,618; 5.17% | | Bob Mills |
| Vegreville—Wainwright | Duff Stewart; 3,873; 7.57% | Leon Benoit; 37,954; 74.17% | Len Legault; 4,727; 9.24% | Brian Rozmahel; 3,822; 7.47% | Robert Peter Kratchmer (WBP); 431 0.84% | Leon Benoit |
| Vegreville—Wainwright | Duff Stewart; 3,873; 7.57% | Leon Benoit; 37,954; 74.17% | Len Legault; 4,727; 9.24% | Brian Rozmahel; 3,822; 7.47% | Blaine William Stephan (CHP); 364 0.71% | Leon Benoit |
| Westlock—St. Paul | Cory Ollikka; 6,531; 15.00% | Brian Storseth; 29,698; 68.22% | Peter Opryshko; 4,368; 10.03% | Richard De Smet; 2,136; 4.91% | Werner Gisler (Ind.); 416 0.96% | David Chatters† |
| Westlock—St. Paul | Cory Ollikka; 6,531; 15.00% | Brian Storseth; 29,698; 68.22% | Peter Opryshko; 4,368; 10.03% | Richard De Smet; 2,136; 4.91% | Clarence Shultz (Ind.); 381 0.88% | David Chatters† |
| Wetaskiwin | Peter Crossley; 4,371; 9.18% | Blaine Calkins; 35,776; 75.15% | Jim Graves; 4,441; 9.33% | Tom Lampman; 3,016; 6.34% | | Dale Johnston† |
| Wild Rose | Judy Stewart; 5,331; 9.74% | Myron Thompson; 39,487; 72.17% | Shannon Nelles; 3,968; 7.25% | Sean Maw; 5,929; 10.84% | | Myron Thompson |
| Yellowhead | Nancy Love; 4,066; 9.45% | Rob Merrifield; 30,640; 71.19% | Noel Lapierre; 4,712; 10.95% | Monika Schaefer; 2,856; 6.64% | John Marvin Wierenga (CHP); 765; 1.78% | Rob Merrifield |

=== Edmonton and environs ===
| Electoral district | Candidates | | | | | Incumbent |
| Electoral district | Liberal | Conservative | NDP | Green | Other | Incumbent |
|---|---|---|---|---|---|---|
| Edmonton Centre | Anne McLellan; 22,196; 38.58% | Laurie Hawn; 25,805; 44.85% | Donna Martyn; 6,187; 10.75% | David J. Parker; 3,021; 5.25% | Peggy Morton (M–L); 117 0.20% | **Anne McLellan** |
| Edmonton Centre | Anne McLellan; 22,196; 38.58% | Laurie Hawn; 25,805; 44.85% | Donna Martyn; 6,187; 10.75% | David J. Parker; 3,021; 5.25% | Chandra Segaran Swamy (Ind.); 204 0.35% | **Anne McLellan** |
| Edmonton East | Nicole Martel; 13,088; 26.16% | Peter Goldring; 25,086; 50.13% | Arlene Chapman; 9,243; 18.47% | Trey Capnerhurst; 2,623; 5.24% | | Peter Goldring |
| Edmonton—Leduc | Jim Jacuta; 10,856; 19.46% | James Rajotte; 33,764; 60.53% | Marty Rybiak; 7,685; 13.78% | Ben Morrison Pettit; 3,479; 6.24% | | James Rajotte |
| Edmonton—Mill Woods— Beaumont | Amarjit Grewal; 9,809; 21.15% | Mike Lake; 27,191; 58.62% | Neal Gray; 6,749; 14.55% | Kate Harrington; 2,073; 4.47% | Kyle McLeod (Ind.); 477 1.03% | David Kilgour (Note: Elected as a Liberal in 2004, left the Liberal caucus in April 2005 to protest the Sponsorship scandal.) |
| Edmonton—Mill Woods— Beaumont | Amarjit Grewal; 9,809; 21.15% | Mike Lake; 27,191; 58.62% | Neal Gray; 6,749; 14.55% | Kate Harrington; 2,073; 4.47% | Naomi Rankin (Comm.); 85 0.18% | David Kilgour |
| Edmonton—St. Albert | Stanley Haroun; 11,893; 20.29% | John Williams; 34,997; 59.69% | Mike Melymick; 8,218; 14.02% | Peter Johnston; 3,520; 6.00% | | John Williams |
| Edmonton—Sherwood Park | Ron Symic; 7,801; 14.36% | Ken Epp; 34,740; 63.97% | Laurie Lang; 7,773; 14.31% | Lynn T. Lau; 3,992; 7.35% | | Ken Epp |
| Edmonton—Spruce Grove | Brad Enge; 9,776; 16.83% | Rona Ambrose; 38,826; 66.83% | Jason Rockwell; 6,091; 10.48% | John Lackey; 3,404; 5.86% | | Rona Ambrose |
| Edmonton—Strathcona | Andy Hladyshevsky; 9,391; 17.80% | Rahim Jaffer; 22,009; 41.71% | Linda Duncan; 17,153; 32.51% | Cameron Wakefield; 3,139; 5.95% | Dave Dowling (Mar.); 390 0.74% | Rahim Jaffer |
| Edmonton—Strathcona | Andy Hladyshevsky; 9,391; 17.80% | Rahim Jaffer; 22,009; 41.71% | Linda Duncan; 17,153; 32.51% | Cameron Wakefield; 3,139; 5.95% | Michael Fedeyko (PC); 582 1.10% | Rahim Jaffer |
| Edmonton—Strathcona | Andy Hladyshevsky; 9,391; 17.80% | Rahim Jaffer; 22,009; 41.71% | Linda Duncan; 17,153; 32.51% | Cameron Wakefield; 3,139; 5.95% | Kevan Hunter (M–L); 106 0.20% | Rahim Jaffer |

=== Calgary ===
| Electoral district | Candidates | | | | | | Incumbent |
| Electoral district | Liberal | Conservative | NDP | Green | Canadian Action | Other | Incumbent |
|---|---|---|---|---|---|---|---|
| Calgary Centre | Heesung Kim; 10,464; 19.19% | Lee Richardson; 30,213; 55.41% | Brian Pincott; 7,227; 13.25% | John N. Johnson; 6,372; 11.69% | Trevor Grover; 250; 0.46% | | Lee Richardson |
| Calgary Centre-North | Matthew Moody; 7,628; 13.70% | Jim Prentice; 31,174; 56.00% | John Chan; 9,341; 16.78% | Mark MacGillivray; 6,573; 11.81% | James S. Kohut; 168; 0.30% | Margaret Peggy Askin (M-L); 194 0.35% | Jim Prentice |
| Calgary Centre-North | Matthew Moody; 7,628; 13.70% | Jim Prentice; 31,174; 56.00% | John Chan; 9,341; 16.78% | Mark MacGillivray; 6,573; 11.81% | James S. Kohut; 168; 0.30% | Doug Dokis (FPNP); 206 0.37% | Jim Prentice |
| Calgary Centre-North | Matthew Moody; 7,628; 13.70% | Jim Prentice; 31,174; 56.00% | John Chan; 9,341; 16.78% | Mark MacGillivray; 6,573; 11.81% | James S. Kohut; 168; 0.30% | Michael Falconar (Ind.); 383 0.69% | Jim Prentice |
| Calgary East | Dobie To; 5,410; 13.56% | Deepak Obhrai; 26,766; 67.10% | Patrick Arnell; 4,338; 10.87% | John Mark Taylor; 2,954; 7.41% | Ghazanfar Khan; 183; 0.46% | Jason Devine (Comm.); 239; 0.60% | Deepak Obhrai |
| Calgary Northeast | Jaswinder S. Johal; 9,241; 22.06% | Art Hanger; 27,169; 64.86% | Tyler Ragan; 3,284; 7.84% | Trung Nguyen; 1,833; 4.38% | | Ron Sanderson (Ind.); 364; 0.87% | Art Hanger |
| Calgary—Nose Hill | Ted Haney; 9,443; 17.10% | Diane Ablonczy; 37,815; 68.49% | Bruce Kaufman; 4,385; 7.94% | Juliet Burgess; 3,573; 6.47% | | | Diane Ablonczy |
| Calgary Southeast | James Ludwar; 6,193; 10.35% | Jason Kenney; 44,987; 75.18% | Eric Leavitt; 4,584; 7.66% | Gus Gutoski; 4,076; 6.81% | | | Jason Kenney |
| Calgary Southwest | Mike Swanson; 6,553; 11.41% | **Stephen J. Harper**; 41,549; 72.36% | Holly Heffernan; 4,628; 8.06% | Kim Warnke; 4,407; 7.68% | | Larry R. Heather (CHP); 279; 0.49% | **Stephen Harper** |
| Calgary West | Jennifer Pollock; 14,328; 22.12% | Rob Anders; 38,020; 58.71% | Teale Phelps Bondaroff; 5,370; 8.29% | Danielle Roberts; 6,653; 10.27% | Tim Cayzer; 265; 0.41% | André Vachon (M-L); 125; 0.19% | Rob Anders |

== British Columbia ==
=== BC Interior ===
| Electoral district | Candidates | | | | | Incumbent |
| Electoral district | Liberal | Conservative | NDP | Green | Other | Incumbent |
|---|---|---|---|---|---|---|
| British Columbia Southern Interior | Bill Profili; 9,383; 20.20% | Derek Zeisman; 8,948; 19.26% | Alex Atamanenko; 22,742; 48.96% | Scott Leyland; 5,258; 11.32% | Brian Sproule (M-L); 123; 0.26% | Jim Gouk† |
| Cariboo—Prince George | Simon Yu; 10,509; 24.07% | Dick Harris; 19,624; 44.94% | Alfred Julian Trudeau; 10,129; 23.20% | Alex Bracewell; 2,416; 5.53% | Carol Lee Chapman (M-L); 109 0.25% | Dick Harris |
| Cariboo—Prince George | Simon Yu; 10,509; 24.07% | Dick Harris; 19,624; 44.94% | Alfred Julian Trudeau; 10,129; 23.20% | Alex Bracewell; 2,416; 5.53% | Bev Collins (CAP); 279 0.64% | Dick Harris |
| Cariboo—Prince George | Simon Yu; 10,509; 24.07% | Dick Harris; 19,624; 44.94% | Alfred Julian Trudeau; 10,129; 23.20% | Alex Bracewell; 2,416; 5.53% | Christopher S. M. Kempling (CHP); 505 1.16% | Dick Harris |
| Cariboo—Prince George | Simon Yu; 10,509; 24.07% | Dick Harris; 19,624; 44.94% | Alfred Julian Trudeau; 10,129; 23.20% | Alex Bracewell; 2,416; 5.53% | Don Roberts (FPNP); 95 0.22% | Dick Harris |
| Kamloops— Thompson—Cariboo | Ken Sommerfeld; 13,454; 25.22% | Betty Zane Hinton; 20,948; 39.27% | Michael Crawford; 16,417; 30.78% | Matt G. Greenwood; 2,518; 4.72% | | Betty Hinton |
| Kelowna—Lake Country | Vern Nielsen; 14,807; 25.84% | Ron Cannan; 28,174; 49.17% | Kevin M. Hagglund; 9,538; 16.64% | Angela Reid; 4,562; 7.96% | David Thomson (CAP); 223; 0.39% | Werner Schmidt† |
| Kootenay—Columbia | Jhim Burwell; 5,443; 13.34% | Jim Abbott; 22,181; 54.36% | Brent Bush; 10,560; 25.88% | Clements Verhoeven; 2,490; 6.10% | Thomas Fredrick Sima (CAP); 132; 0.32% | Jim Abbott |
| Okanagan—Coquihalla | David Perry; 11,575; 23.01% | Stockwell Day; 25,278; 50.24% | John Harrop; 9,660; 19.20% | Karan Bowyer; 3,802; 7.56% | | Stockwell Day |
| Okanagan—Shuswap | Will Hansma; 12,330; 22.62% | Colin Mayes; 24,448; 44.86% | Alice Brown; 14,551; 26.70% | Harry Naegel; 2,215; 4.06% | Gordon Campbell (NA); 425 0.78% | Darrel Stinson† |
| Okanagan—Shuswap | Will Hansma; 12,330; 22.62% | Colin Mayes; 24,448; 44.86% | Alice Brown; 14,551; 26.70% | Harry Naegel; 2,215; 4.06% | Neville O'Grady (CAP); 172 0.32% | Darrel Stinson† |
| Okanagan—Shuswap | Will Hansma; 12,330; 22.62% | Colin Mayes; 24,448; 44.86% | Alice Brown; 14,551; 26.70% | Harry Naegel; 2,215; 4.06% | Darren Seymour (Ind.); 359 0.66% | Darrel Stinson† |
| Prince George—Peace River | Nathan Bauder; 5,889; 15.74% | Jay Hill; 22,412; 59.89% | Malcolm James Crockett; 6,377; 17.04% | Hilary Crowley; 2,394; 6.40% | Donna Young (Ind.); 351; 0.94% | Jay Hill |
| Skeena—Bulkley Valley | Gordon Stamp-Vincent; 4,845; 12.66% | Mike Scott; 12,630; 33.00% | Nathan Cullen; 18,496; 48.33% | Phil Brienesse; 1,064; 2.78% | Rod Taylor (CHP); 1,235; 3.23% | Nathan Cullen |

=== Fraser Valley and Southern Lower Mainland ===
| Electoral district | Candidates | | | | | Incumbent |
| Electoral district | Liberal | Conservative | NDP | Green | Other | Incumbent |
|---|---|---|---|---|---|---|
| Abbotsford | David Oliver; 5,976; 12.68% | Ed Fast; 29,825; 63.27% | Jeffrey Hansen-Carlson; 8,004; 16.98% | Stephanie Ashley-Pryce; 2,740; 5.81% | Tim Felger (Mar.); 334 0.71% | Randy White† |
| Abbotsford | David Oliver; 5,976; 12.68% | Ed Fast; 29,825; 63.27% | Jeffrey Hansen-Carlson; 8,004; 16.98% | Stephanie Ashley-Pryce; 2,740; 5.81% | Richard Gebert (CAP); 173 0.37% | Randy White† |
| Abbotsford | David Oliver; 5,976; 12.68% | Ed Fast; 29,825; 63.27% | Jeffrey Hansen-Carlson; 8,004; 16.98% | Stephanie Ashley-Pryce; 2,740; 5.81% | David S. MacKay (M-L); 86 0.18% | Randy White† |
| Chilliwack—Fraser Canyon | Myra Sweeney; 8,106; 16.91% | Chuck Strahl; 26,842; 55.99% | Malcolm James; 10,015; 20.89% | Ed Baye; 1,929; 4.02% | **Ron Gray** (CHP); 935 1.95% | Chuck Strahl |
| Chilliwack—Fraser Canyon | Myra Sweeney; 8,106; 16.91% | Chuck Strahl; 26,842; 55.99% | Malcolm James; 10,015; 20.89% | Ed Baye; 1,929; 4.02% | Dorothy-Jean O'Donnell (M-L); 114 0.24% | Chuck Strahl |
| Delta—Richmond East | Patricia Whittaker; 15,527; 31.88% | John Cummins; 23,595; 48.44% | William Jonsson; 7,176; 14.73% | Jean-Philippe Laflamme; 2,414; 4.96% | | John Cummins |
| Fleetwood—Port Kells | Brenda Locke; 13,749; 31.57% | Nina Grewal; 14,577; 33.47% | Barry Bell; 10,961; 25.17% | Duncan McDonald; 1,059; 2.43% | Jack Cook (Ind.); 3,202; 7.35% | Nina Grewal |
| Langley | Bill Brooks; 12,553; 23.09% | Mark Warawa; 28,577; 52.57% | Angel Claypool; 9,993; 18.38% | Patrick Meyer; 3,023; 5.56% | Vicki Lee Sloan (CAP); 211; 0.39% | Mark Warawa |
| Newton—North Delta | Sukh Dhaliwal; 15,006; 34.25% | Phil Eidsvik; 13,416; 30.62% | Nancy Clegg; 14,006; 31.96% | Sunny Athwal; 853; 1.95% | Harjit Daudharia (Comm.); 112 0.26% | Gurmant Grewal† |
| Newton—North Delta | Sukh Dhaliwal; 15,006; 34.25% | Phil Eidsvik; 13,416; 30.62% | Nancy Clegg; 14,006; 31.96% | Sunny Athwal; 853; 1.95% | Rob Girn (Ind.); 319 0.73% | Gurmant Grewal† |
| Newton—North Delta | Sukh Dhaliwal; 15,006; 34.25% | Phil Eidsvik; 13,416; 30.62% | Nancy Clegg; 14,006; 31.96% | Sunny Athwal; 853; 1.95% | Mike Saifie (Ind.); 106 0.24% | Gurmant Grewal† |
| Pitt Meadows—Maple Ridge— Mission | Keith Henry; 10,556; 20.25% | Randy Kamp; 20,946; 40.19% | Mike Bocking; 18,225; 34.97% | Rob Hornsey; 1,694; 3.25% | Dan Banov (Mar.); 327 0.63% | Randy Kamp |
| Pitt Meadows—Maple Ridge— Mission | Keith Henry; 10,556; 20.25% | Randy Kamp; 20,946; 40.19% | Mike Bocking; 18,225; 34.97% | Rob Hornsey; 1,694; 3.25% | Erin Knipstrom (Ind.); 277 0.53% | Randy Kamp |
| Pitt Meadows—Maple Ridge— Mission | Keith Henry; 10,556; 20.25% | Randy Kamp; 20,946; 40.19% | Mike Bocking; 18,225; 34.97% | Rob Hornsey; 1,694; 3.25% | Frank Martin (M-L); 95 0.18% | Randy Kamp |
| Richmond | Raymond Chan; 18,712; 42.83% | Darrel Robert Reid; 16,904; 38.69% | Neil Smith; 6,106; 13.98% | Richard Mathias; 1,967; 4.50% | | Raymond Chan |
| South Surrey—White Rock— Cloverdale | Jim McMurtry; 17,336; 30.67% | Russ Hiebert; 26,383; 46.68% | Libby Thornton; 9,525; 16.85% | Pierre Rovtar; 2,980; 5.27% | Brian Marlatt (PC); 293; 0.52% | Russ Hiebert |
| Surrey North | Surjit Kooner; 6,991; 19.59% | David Matta; 9,864; 27.64% | Penny Priddy; 16,307; 45.69% | Roy Whyte; 961; 2.69% | John Baloun (Ind.); 420 1.18% | Vacant (Note: Formerly held by Independent MP Chuck Cadman, died July 9, 2005) |
| Surrey North | Surjit Kooner; 6,991; 19.59% | David Matta; 9,864; 27.64% | Penny Priddy; 16,307; 45.69% | Roy Whyte; 961; 2.69% | Nikolas Langlands (PC); 221 0.62% | Vacant |
| Surrey North | Surjit Kooner; 6,991; 19.59% | David Matta; 9,864; 27.64% | Penny Priddy; 16,307; 45.69% | Roy Whyte; 961; 2.69% | Kevin Pielak (CHP) 411 1.15% | Vacant |
| Surrey North | Surjit Kooner; 6,991; 19.59% | David Matta; 9,864; 27.64% | Penny Priddy; 16,307; 45.69% | Roy Whyte; 961; 2.69% | Nina Rivet (Ind.); 512 1.43% | Vacant |

=== Vancouver and Northern Lower Mainland ===
| Electoral district | Candidates | | | | | | Incumbent |
| Electoral district | Liberal | Conservative | NDP | Green | Marxist-Leninist | Other | Incumbent |
|---|---|---|---|---|---|---|---|
| Burnaby—Douglas | Bill Cunningham; 16,079; 33.02% | George Drazenovic; 13,467; 27.65% | Bill Siksay; 17,323; 35.57% | Ray Power; 1,694; 3.48% | | Timothy George Gidora (Comm.); 138; 0.28% | Bill Siksay |
| Burnaby—New Westminster | Mary Pynenburg; 13,420; 29.94% | Marc Dalton; 12,364; 27.58% | Peter Julian; 17,391; 38.79% | Scott Henry Janzen; 1,654; 3.69% | | | Peter Julian |
| New Westminster—Coquitlam | Joyce Murray; 11,931; 23.53% | Paul Forseth; 16,494; 32.53% | Dawn Black; 19,427; 38.32% | Sven Biggs; 1,496; 2.95% | Joseph Theriault; 54; 0.11% | Dick Estey (Ind.); 123 0.24% | Paul Forseth |
| New Westminster—Coquitlam | Joyce Murray; 11,931; 23.53% | Paul Forseth; 16,494; 32.53% | Dawn Black; 19,427; 38.32% | Sven Biggs; 1,496; 2.95% | Joseph Theriault; 54; 0.11% | Paul Warnett (Ind.); 1,174 2.32% | Paul Forseth |
| North Vancouver | Don Bell; 25,357; 42.35% | Cindy Silver; 22,021; 36.78% | Sherry Shaghaghi; 7,903; 13.20% | Jim Stephenson; 4,483; 7.49% | Michael Hill; 112; 0.19% | | Don Bell |
| Port Moody—Westwood— Port Coquitlam | Jon Kingsbury; 13,134; 27.06% | James Moore; 19,961; 41.12% | Mary Woo Sims; 11,196; 23.07% | Scott Froom; 1,623; 3.34% | | Lewis Dahlby (Libert.); 309 0.64% | James Moore |
| Port Moody—Westwood— Port Coquitlam | Jon Kingsbury; 13,134; 27.06% | James Moore; 19,961; 41.12% | Mary Woo Sims; 11,196; 23.07% | Scott Froom; 1,623; 3.34% | | Greg Watrich (Ind.); 2,317 4.77% | James Moore |
| Vancouver Centre | Hedy Fry; 25,013; 43.80% | Tony Fogarassy; 11,684; 20.46% | Svend Robinson; 16,374; 28.67% | Jared Evans; 3,340; 5.85% | | Heathcliff Dionysus Campbell (Mar.); 259 0.45% | Hedy Fry |
| Vancouver Centre | Hedy Fry; 25,013; 43.80% | Tony Fogarassy; 11,684; 20.46% | Svend Robinson; 16,374; 28.67% | Jared Evans; 3,340; 5.85% | | John Clarke (Libert.); 304 0.53% | Hedy Fry |
| Vancouver Centre | Hedy Fry; 25,013; 43.80% | Tony Fogarassy; 11,684; 20.46% | Svend Robinson; 16,374; 28.67% | Jared Evans; 3,340; 5.85% | | Joe Pal (CHP); 130 0.23% | Hedy Fry |
| Vancouver East | David Carl Haggard; 9,907; 23.42% | Elizabeth M. Pagtakhan; 5,631; 13.31% | Libby Davies; 23,927; 56.57% | Christine Ellis; 2,536; 6.00% | | Bryce Bartholomew (CAP); 293; 0.69% | Libby Davies |
| Vancouver Kingsway | **David Emerson**; 20,062; 43.45% | Kanman Wong; 8,679; 18.80% | Ian Waddell; 15,470; 33.51% | Arno Schortinghuis; 1,307; 2.83% | Donna Petersen; 68; 0.15% | Kimball Cariou (Comm.); 162 0.35% | **David Emerson** |
| Vancouver Kingsway | **David Emerson**; 20,062; 43.45% | Kanman Wong; 8,679; 18.80% | Ian Waddell; 15,470; 33.51% | Arno Schortinghuis; 1,307; 2.83% | Donna Petersen; 68; 0.15% | Connie Fogal (CAP); 143 0.31% | **David Emerson** |
| Vancouver Kingsway | **David Emerson**; 20,062; 43.45% | Kanman Wong; 8,679; 18.80% | Ian Waddell; 15,470; 33.51% | Arno Schortinghuis; 1,307; 2.83% | Donna Petersen; 68; 0.15% | Matt Kadioglu (Libert.); 277 0.60% | **David Emerson** |
| Vancouver Quadra | **Stephen Owen**; 28,655; 49.14% | Stephen Rogers; 16,844; 28.89% | David Askew; 9,379; 16.08% | Ben West; 2,974; 5.10% | Donovan Young; 41; 0.07% | Marc Boyer (Mar.); 158 0.27% | **Stephen Owen** |
| Vancouver Quadra | **Stephen Owen**; 28,655; 49.14% | Stephen Rogers; 16,844; 28.89% | David Askew; 9,379; 16.08% | Ben West; 2,974; 5.10% | Donovan Young; 41; 0.07% | Betty Krawczyk (Ind.); 263 0.45% | **Stephen Owen** |
| Vancouver South | **Ujjal Dosanjh**; 20,991; 48.05% | Tarlok Sablok; 11,856; 27.14% | Bev Meslo; 9,205; 21.07% | Doug Perry; 1,435; 3.28% | Charles Boylan; 202; 0.46% | | **Ujjal Dosanjh** |
| West Vancouver—Sunshine Coast —Sea to Sky Country | Blair Wilson; 23,867; 37.51% | John Weston; 22,891; 35.97% | Judith Wilson; 12,766; 20.06% | Silvaine Zimmermann; 3,966; 6.23% | Anne Jamieson; 145; 0.23% | | John Reynolds† |

=== Vancouver Island ===
| Electoral district | Candidates | | | | | | Incumbent |
| Electoral district | Liberal | Conservative | NDP | Green | Canadian Action | Other | Incumbent |
|---|---|---|---|---|---|---|---|
| Esquimalt—Juan de Fuca | Keith Martin; 20,761; 34.93% | Troy DeSouza; 16,327; 27.47% | Randall Garrison; 18,595; 31.29% | Mike Robinson; 3,385; 5.70% | David Piney; 89; 0.15% | **Douglas Christie** (WBP); 272; 0.46% | Keith Martin |
| Nanaimo—Alberni | Jim Stewart; 12,023; 19.05% | James Lunney; 26,102; 41.36% | Manjeet Uppal; 20,335; 32.23% | David Wright; 3,379; 5.35% | Jen Fisher-Bradley; 113; 0.18% | Barbara Biley (M-L); 94 0.15% | James Lunney |
| Nanaimo—Alberni | Jim Stewart; 12,023; 19.05% | James Lunney; 26,102; 41.36% | Manjeet Uppal; 20,335; 32.23% | David Wright; 3,379; 5.35% | Jen Fisher-Bradley; 113; 0.18% | R. L. Dusty Miller (Ind.); 920 1.46% | James Lunney |
| Nanaimo—Alberni | Jim Stewart; 12,023; 19.05% | James Lunney; 26,102; 41.36% | Manjeet Uppal; 20,335; 32.23% | David Wright; 3,379; 5.35% | Jen Fisher-Bradley; 113; 0.18% | Frank Wagner (CHP); 136 0.22% | James Lunney |
| Nanaimo—Cowichan | Brian Scott; 9,352; 15.32% | Norm Sowden; 19,615; 32.13% | Jean Crowder; 28,558; 46.77% | Harold Henn; 3,107; 5.09% | Jeff Warr; 277; 0.45% | Jack East (M-L); 148; 0.24% | Jean Crowder |
| Saanich—Gulf Islands | Sheila Orr; 17,144; 26.09% | Gary Vincent Lunn; 24,416; 37.15% | Jennifer Burgis; 17,445; 26.54% | Andrew Lewis; 6,533; 9.94% | | Patricia O'Brien (WBP); 183; 0.28% | Gary Lunn |
| Vancouver Island North | Jim Mitchell; 7,239; 12.83% | John Duncan; 22,936; 40.64% | Catherine Bell; 23,552; 41.73% | Michael Mascall; 2,715; 4.81% | | | John Duncan |
| Victoria | David Mulroney; 17,056; 27.52% | Robin Baird; 15,249; 24.60% | Denise Savoie; 23,839; 38.46% | Ariel Lade; 5,036; 8.13% | | Saul Andersen (Ind.); 282 0.45% | David Anderson† |
| Victoria | David Mulroney; 17,056; 27.52% | Robin Baird; 15,249; 24.60% | Denise Savoie; 23,839; 38.46% | Ariel Lade; 5,036; 8.13% | | Bruce Burnett (WBP); 208 0.34% | David Anderson† |
| Victoria | David Mulroney; 17,056; 27.52% | Robin Baird; 15,249; 24.60% | Denise Savoie; 23,839; 38.46% | Ariel Lade; 5,036; 8.13% | | Fred Mallach (Mar.); 311 0.50% | David Anderson† |

== Nunavut ==
| Electoral district | Candidates | | | | | Incumbent |
| Electoral district | Liberal | Conservative | NDP | Green | Marijuana | Incumbent |
|---|---|---|---|---|---|---|
| Nunavut | Nancy Karetak-Lindell; 3,673; 39.98% | David Aglukark Sr. 2,670; 29.06% | Bill Riddell; 1,576; 17.15% | Feliks Kappi; 544; 5.92% | D. Ed deVries; 724; 7.88% | Nancy Karetak-Lindell |

== Northwest Territories ==
| Electoral district | Candidates | | | | | Incumbent |
| Electoral district | Liberal | Conservative | NDP | Green | Independent | Incumbent |
|---|---|---|---|---|---|---|
| Western Arctic | Ethel Blondin-Andrew; 5,643; 34.98% | Richard Edjericon; 3,200; 19.84% | Dennis Bevington; 6,802; 42.16% | Alexandre Beaudin; 338; 2.10% | Jan H. van der Veen; 149; 0.92% | Ethel Blondin-Andrew |

== Yukon ==
| Electoral district | Candidates | | | | Incumbent |
| Electoral district | Liberal | Conservative | NDP | Green | Incumbent |
|---|---|---|---|---|---|
| Yukon | Larry Bagnell; 6,847; 48.52% | Susan Greetham; 3,341; 23.67% | Pam Boyde; 3,366; 23.85% | Philippe LeBlond; 559; 3.96% | Larry Bagnell |
