= Dale Johnston =

Dale Johnston may refer to:

- Dale Johnston (curler)
- Dale Johnston (politician), Canadian politician
- Dale Johnston (sound editor)
- Dale Johnston, wrongfully convicted of murder

== See also ==
- Dale Johnson, American football executive
