= Dale Johnston (sound editor) =

American sound editor

- Born: April 8, 1933; United States
- Died: October 26, 2004 (aged 71); Thousand Oaks, California, U.S.
- Occupation: Sound editor

Dale Johnston (April 8, 1933 – October 26, 2004) was an American sound editor. He won a Primetime Emmy Award and was nominated for three more in the category Outstanding Sound Editing for his work on the television programs The Six Million Dollar Man and Lou Grant, and also the television film Duel.

Johnston died on October 26, 2004, in Sherman Oaks, California, at the age of 71.
