= Rivière des Sept Ponts =

Tributary of "rivière du Berger" in Québec, Canada

- Location within Quebec

Location
- Country: Canada
- Province: Quebec
- Region: Capitale-Nationale
- Regional County Municipality: Quebec City

Physical characteristics
- Source: Confluence of two mountain streams
  - location: Quebec City
  - coordinates: 46°56′10″N 71°16′20″W
  - elevation: 330
- Mouth: Rivière du Berger
  - location: Quebec City
  - coordinates: 46°53′48″N 71°18′06″W
  - elevation: 159 m
- Length: 5.8 km (3.6 mi)

Basin features
- Tributaries
  - left: (Upward from the mouth) three unidentified streams, Chicots stream.
  - right: Unidentified stream.

The rivière des Sept Ponts (English: river of the seven bridges) is a tributary of the rivière du Berger flowing in the sectors of Beauport and Charlesbourg, in Quebec City, Quebec, Canada.

The upper part of the valley of the Sept Ponts river does not have a road. Its lower part, downstream from Lac Bégon, is located mainly in urban areas and is mainly served by Boulevard Henri-Bourassa, Rue Sophia Melvin and Rue des Nations Est.

The surface of the Sept Ponts river (except the rapids areas) is generally frozen from the beginning of December to the end of March; however, safe circulation on the ice is generally done from the end of December to the beginning of March. The water level of the river varies with the seasons and the precipitation; the spring flood occurs in March or April.

== Geography ==
The Rivière des Sept Ponts is the second main tributary of the watershed of the rivière du Berger. It rises at the confluence of two mountain streams (altitude: 330 metres (1,080 ft)) in a wooded and mountainous area north of the borough of Beauport. This source is located at:

- 2.0 kilometres (1.2 mi) south-east of the center of Lac-Beauport;
- 0.6 kilometres (0.37 mi) south-west of the summit of Montagne des Trois Sommets (altitude: 457 metres (1,499 ft);
- 1.9 kilometres (1.2 mi) north-west of Lac des Roches which is the head lake of the rivière des Roches;
- 4.9 kilometres (3.0 mi) north of the confluence of the Sept Ponts river and the rivière du Berger.

From its source, the river of the seven bridges flows on 5.8 kilometres (3.6 mi), with a drop of 171 metres (561 ft), according to the following segments:

- 1.6 kilometres (0.99 mi) to the south with a good drop in a steep valley, to the Chicots stream (coming from the northeast);
- 2.7 kilometres (1.7 mi) to the south by forming a hook towards the southwest, displaying a good drop in a deep valley and crossing Lake Bégon (length: 0.3 metres (1 ft 0 in); altitude: 185 metres (607 ft)) at the end of the segment up to the dam at its mouth;
- 0.5 kilometres (0.31 mi) to the south by crossing rue de l'Aventure and crossing Lac Flamand (length: 0.18 metres (7.1 in); altitude: 175 metres (574 ft)) at the end of the segment, until its mouth. Note: Plage-Laurentides is located east of Lac Flamand;
- 1.0 kilometre (0.62 mi) to the south by entering the residential area, crossing the rue du Dublin, Sophia Melvin and des Nation Est, until it meets the Berger river.

From this confluence, the current descends on 17.1 kilometres (10.6 mi) to the southeast in an urban area, then to the southwest, the course of the Berger river; then on 8.3 kilometres (5.2 mi) generally towards the northeast in an urban area, following the course of the Saint-Charles River which flows onto the east bank of the Saint-Laurent river.

== Toponymy ==
The toponym "Rivière des Sept Ponts" was formalized on March 28, 1974, at the Commission de toponymie du Québec.

== See also ==
- List of rivers of Quebec
