= Charlesbourg =

Charlesbourg may refer to:

- Charlesbourg, Quebec City
- Charlesbourg-Haute-Saint-Charles, current federal electoral district
- Charlesbourg-Jacques-Cartier, former federal electoral district
- Charlesbourg (provincial electoral district), in Quebec
