= Pierre Bussières =

Canadian politician

The Hon. Pierre Bussières

Member of the Canadian Parliament for Portneuf
- In office 1974–1979
- Preceded by: Roland Godin
- Succeeded by: Rolland Dion

Member of the Canadian Parliament for Charlesbourg
- In office 1979–1984
- Preceded by: District was created in 1976
- Succeeded by: Monique Tardif

Personal details
- Born: July 8, 1939 (age 87) Normandin, Quebec
- Party: Liberal
- Cabinet: Minister of National Revenue (1982-1984)

Pierre Bussières, PC (July 8, 1939 – August 15, 2014) was a Canadian politician.

Bussières was first elected to the House of Commons of Canada in the 1974 federal election as the Member of Parliament (MP) for Portneuf. He was re-elected in the 1979 election, this time from Charlesbourg. He was chairman of the Quebec Liberal caucus while the party was in opposition.

The defeat of the Progressive Conservative government of Prime Minister Joe Clark on a non-confidence motion occurred after Pierre Trudeau had announced his resignation as Liberal Party leader. Bussières quickly announced that the Quebec caucus unanimously supported Trudeau's return as leader, and urged the former prime minister] to rescind his resignation. After the rest of the federal caucus and the party executive followed suit in requesting his return, Trudeau announced that he would lead the Liberals into the 1980 federal election held as a result of the Clark government's fall.

The Liberals were elected with a majority government, and Trudeau appointed Bussières to cabinet as Minister of State for finance. In 1982, he was promoted to Minister of National Revenue.

Bussières was not included in the cabinet of Trudeau's successor, John Turner, which was formed in June 1984. Nevertheless, he was a candidate in the 1984 federal election, but was defeated as the Liberals lost government and were reduced to forty seats in the House of Commons.

1979 Canadian federal election: Portneuf
Party	Candidate	Votes	%	±%
Liberal	Rolland Dion	25,297	63.6	+14.8
Social Credit	Bernard Lapointe	8,330	20.9	-16.1
Progressive Conservative	Armand Caron	3,620	9.1	+0.7
New Democratic	Renée Brisson	1,346	3.4	-2.3
Rhinoceros	Réjane Mame Bujold	985	2.5	
Union populaire	O'H Ls Gingras	184	0.5	
Total valid votes		39,762	100.0	
