= Daniel Petit =

Canadian politician

Member of Parliament for Charlesbourg—Haute-Saint-Charles
- In office 2006–2011
- Preceded by: Richard Marceau
- Succeeded by: Anne-Marie Day

Personal details
- Born: September 27, 1948 (age 77) Doische, Belgium
- Party: Conservative
- Spouse: Sylvia Petit
- Profession: Lawyer

Daniel Petit (born September 27, 1948 in Doische, Belgium) is a Canadian politician.

A lawyer by profession, Petit is a graduate of Université Laval and was called to the Quebec bar in 1973. He is a founder and partner of the firm Petit, Beaudoin, Société nominale d'avocats. Petit specialized in labour and administrative law and has organized for the Conservatives and the Progressive Conservatives since the 1980s.

He was first elected to the House of Commons of Canada in the 2006 federal election as the Conservative Member of Parliament for Charlesbourg—Haute-Saint-Charles. He defeated incumbent Bloc Québécois MP Richard Marceau to win the seat. In the 2011 election, he was defeated by Anne-Marie Day of the NDP.

He currently serves as the legal commission president of the Conservative Party of Quebec.
