= Anne-Marie Day =

Canadian politician

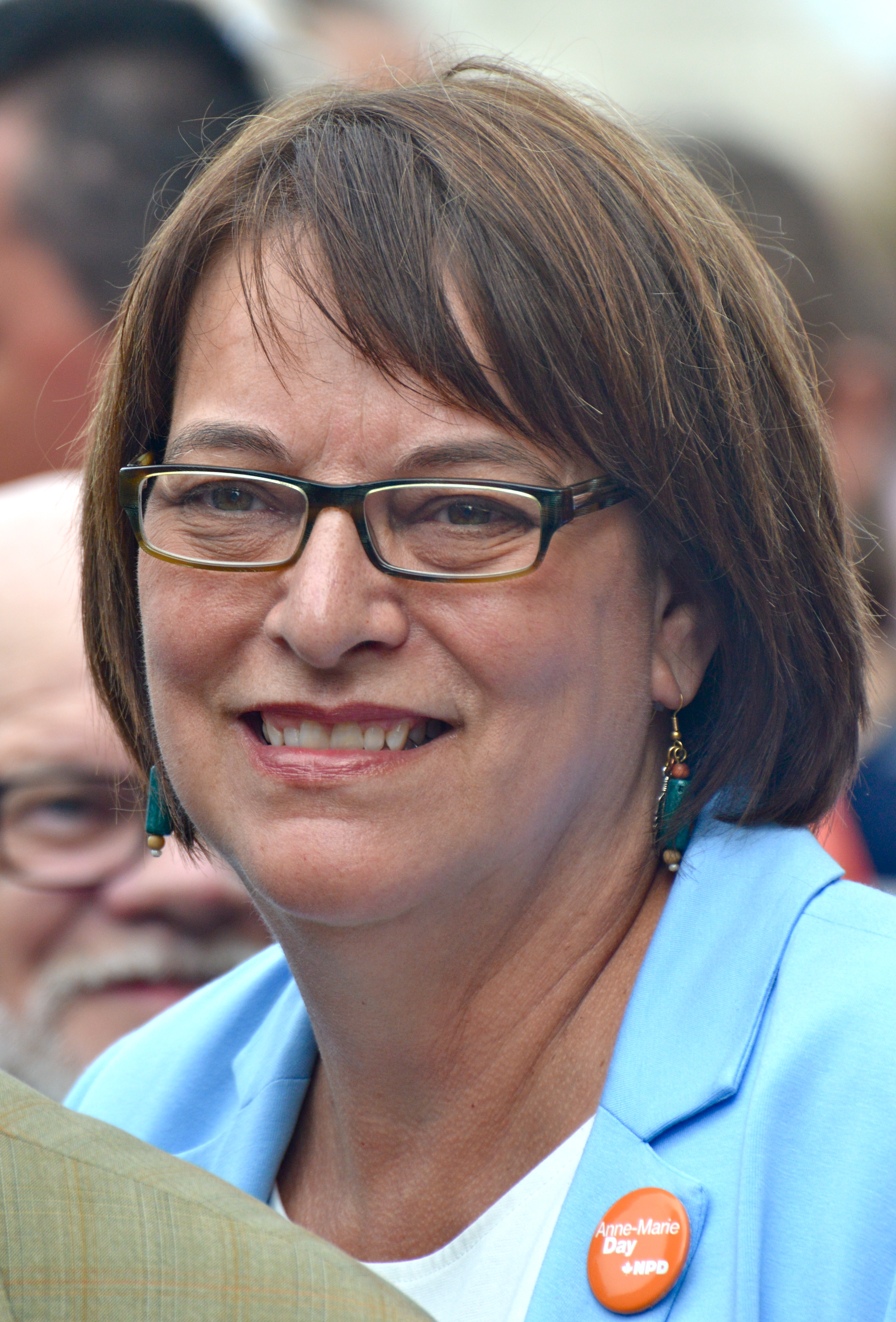
- Anne-Marie Day in 2015

Member of Parliament for Charlesbourg—Haute-Saint-Charles
- In office May 2, 2011 – August 4, 2015
- Preceded by: Daniel Petit
- Succeeded by: Pierre Paul-Hus

Personal details
- Born: February 2, 1954 (age 72) Grande-Rivière, Quebec
- Party: New Democratic Party
- Profession: Director

Anne-Marie Day (born February 2, 1954) is a Canadian politician, who was elected to the House of Commons of Canada in the 2011 election. She represented the electoral district of Charlesbourg—Haute-Saint-Charles as a member of the New Democratic Party.

Prior to being elected, Day was the president of an employment agency, and is a former president of a women's issues group. She has a bachelor's degree in education and a master's degree in local and regional development from Université Laval.

Day also ran in Charlesbourg—Haute-Saint-Charles in the 2008 federal election, but lost.

Despite her anglophone-sounding name, Day is a francophone, and French is her preferred language on the Commons floor.

== Electoral record ==
2015 Canadian federal election
Party	Candidate	Votes	%	±%	Expenditures
Conservative	Pierre Paul-Hus	24,608	42.24	+11.95	–
Liberal	Jean Côté	13,525	23.22	+16.69	–
New Democratic	Anne-Marie Day	11,690	20.07	-24.92	–
Bloc Québécois	Marc Antoine Turmel	7,177	12.32	-3.96	–
Green	Nathalie Baudet	1,256	2.16	+0.6	–
Total valid votes/expense limit		58,256	100.0		$221,301.50
Total rejected ballots		866	–	–	
Turnout		59,122	–	–	
Eligible voters		83,648			
Conservative gain from New Democratic		Swing		+18.44	
Source: Elections Canada

2011 Canadian federal election
Party	Candidate	Votes	%	±%	Expenditures
New Democratic	Anne-Marie Day	24,131	45.0	+31.9	
Conservative	Daniel Petit	16,220	30.3	-10.8	
Bloc Québécois	Félix Grenier	8,732	16.3	-12.9	
Liberal	Martine Gaudreault	3,505	6.5	-7.6	
Green	Simon Verret	832	1.6	-0.9	
Christian Heritage	Simon Cormier	189	0.4	-	
Total valid votes/expense limit		53,609	100.0		
Total rejected ballots		801	1.5	-0.1	
Turnout		54,410	66.2	+2.5	–
Eligible voters		82,140	–	–	

2008 Canadian federal election
Party	Candidate	Votes	%	±%	Expenditures
Conservative	Daniel Petit	20,566	41.14	+0.1	$40,863
Bloc Québécois	Denis Courteau	14,602	29.21	-9.1	$58,190
Liberal	Denise Legros	7,039	14.08	+5.3	$14,902
New Democratic	Anne-Marie Day	6,542	13.08	+6.9	$3,986
Green	François Bédard	1,231	2.46	-0.1	$0
Total valid votes/expense limit		49,980	100.0	$85,288	
Rejected ballots		811	1.6		
Turnout		50,791	63.66		
