= Monique Tardif =

Canadian politician (1936–2016)

Monique Bernatchez Tardif

Member of the Canadian Parliament for Charlesbourg
- In office 1984–1993
- Preceded by: Pierre Bussières
- Succeeded by: Jean-Marc Jacob

Personal details
- Born: January 8, 1936 Quebec City, Quebec, Canada
- Died: October 2, 2016 (aged 80) Saint-Augustin-de-Desmaures, Canada
- Party: Progressive Conservative

Monique Bernatchez Tardif (8 January 1936 – October 2, 2016) was a Canadian politician who served as Progressive Conservative member of the House of Commons of Canada. She was an administrator by career.

Tardif represented the Quebec riding of Charlesbourg where she was first elected in the 1984 federal election and re-elected in 1988, therefore becoming a member in the 33rd and 34th Canadian Parliaments. She was defeated in the 1993 election by Jean-Marc Jacob of the Bloc Québécois.

Tardif died on October 2, 2016, at the age of 80.
