= Rivière des Roches (rivière du Berger) =

Tributary of Saint-Charles River in Québec, Canada

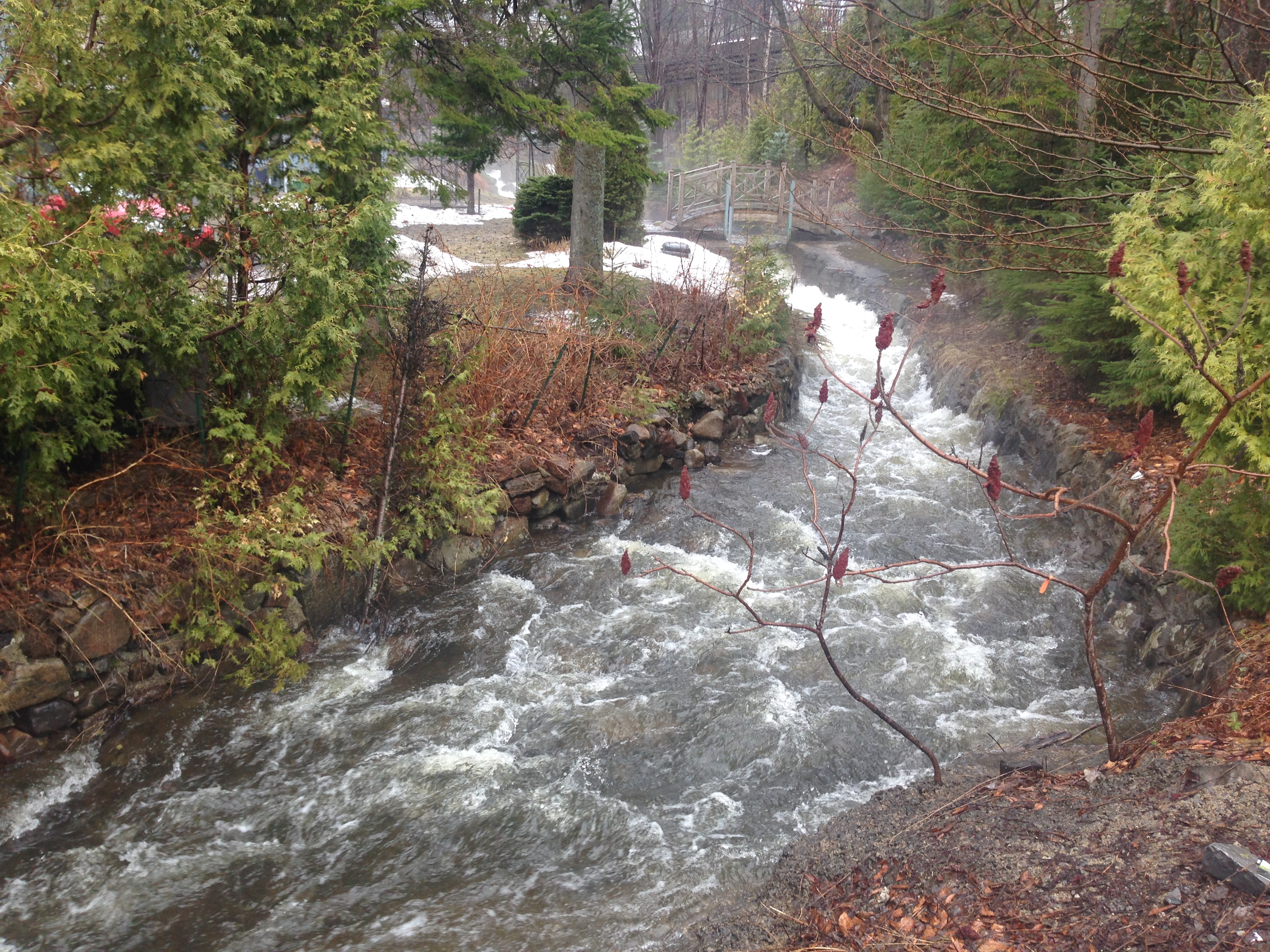

- Location within Quebec

Location
- Country: Canada
- Province: Quebec
- Region: Capitale-Nationale
- Regional County Municipality: Quebec (city)

Physical characteristics
- Source: Lac des Roches
  - location: Quebec (city)
  - coordinates: 46°55′07″N 71°15′42″W
  - elevation: 320
- Mouth: Rivière du Berger
  - location: Quebec (city)
  - coordinates: 46°53′44″N 71°17′20″W
  - elevation: 117 m
- Length: 5.3 km (3.3 mi)

Basin features
- Tributaries
  - left: Unidentified stream.
  - right: Unidentified stream.

The Rivière des Roches is a tributary of the rivière du Berger flowing in the sectors Beauport and Charlesbourg in Quebec City, in the region of Capitale-Nationale, in the province of Quebec, in Canada. Taking its source in the Lac des Roches, it has a length of approximately 5.3 km.

The valley of the Roches river does not have a road except its upper part which is served east of Lac des Roches by Arthur-Drolet road and northeast by Lac-des-Roches road. While its lower part crosses an urban area.

The surface of the Rivière des Roches (except the rapids areas) is generally frozen from the beginning of December to the end of March; however, safe circulation on the ice is generally done from the end of December to the beginning of March. The water level of the river varies with the seasons and the precipitation; the spring flood occurs in March or April.

== Geography ==
The Roches River is one of the main tributaries of the watershed of the rivière du Berger. It has its source in lac des Roches (landmark 46°55′07″N 71°15′41″W) (length: 1.4 kilometres (0.87 mi); altitude: 320 metres (1,050 ft)), located at 320 metres (1,050 ft) above sea level in a wooded area north of the arrondissement of Beauport.

From the dam at the mouth of Lac des Roches, this river flows over 5.3 kilometres (3.3 mi), with a drop of 203 metres (666 ft), according to the following segments:

- 1.6 kilometres (0.99 mi) in a southerly direction, widens temporarily to become the Petit lac des Roches (landmark 46°54′35″N 71°16′13″W) up to its mouth where a dam has been built. Note: This small lake is located between Mont des Épinettes Noires (summit of 363 metres (1,191 ft) on the west side) and Mont Reine-Malouin (summit of 331 metres (1,086 ft) on the east side);
- 2.4 kilometres (1.5 mi) towards the south with a drop of 105 metres (344 ft), up to the limit of the residential area of Orsainville;
- 1.3 kilometres (0.81 mi) to the south by entering a residential area in the Orsainville district where its environment is protected by the Rivière-des-Roches linear park before whether it is, for the most part, channeled or privatized over the rest of its route to its confluence with the Berger river (landmark 46°52′58″N 71°17′43″W).

From this confluence, the current descends on 15.0 kilometres (9.3 mi) to the southeast in an urban area, then to the southwest, the course of the rivière du Berger; then on 8.3 kilometres (5.2 mi) generally towards the northeast in an urban area, following the course of the Saint-Charles River.

== History ==
The river was partly channeled in the 1970s and 1980 due to residential construction.

In 2009, the development of a new residential sector (the "Domaine Rivière des Roches" project) further up the river, raised concerns about environmental protection. A citizen consultation session is held on September 15, 2009. During the fall, the contractor Sébastien Leboeuf decides to immediately begin the work of felling without authorization from the city., causing the illegal cutting of hundreds of trees. The project was adjusted in 2010 to make more room for the environment of the Roches River. The Rivière-des-Roches linear park was created thereafter and the City built paths and walkways there.

== Toponymy ==
The toponym "Rivière des Roches" is based on the rocky character of the bottom of the river.

The toponym "Rivière des Roches" was formalized on December 5, 1968, at the Commission de toponymie du Québec.

== Gallery ==
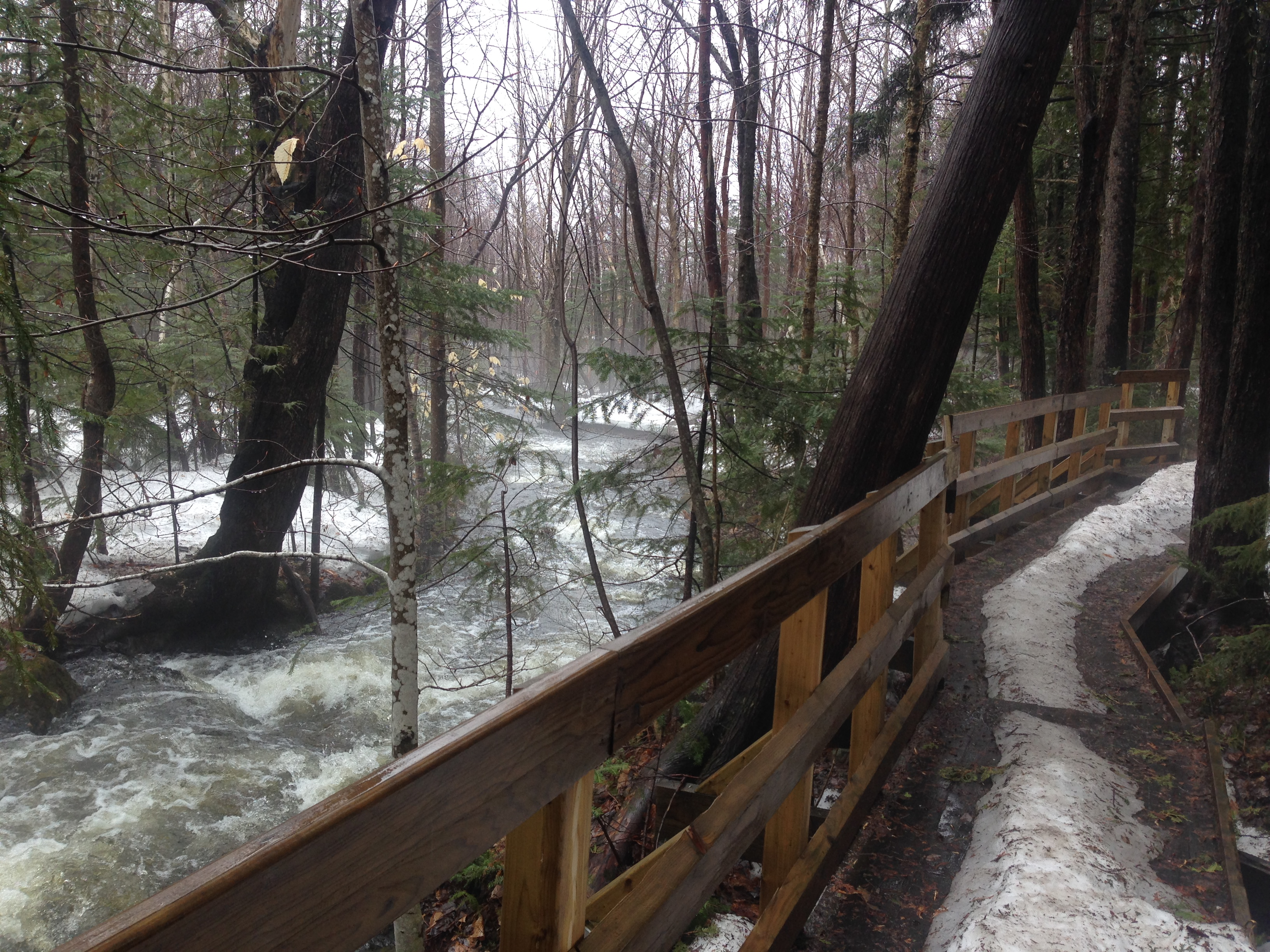
Trail along the river

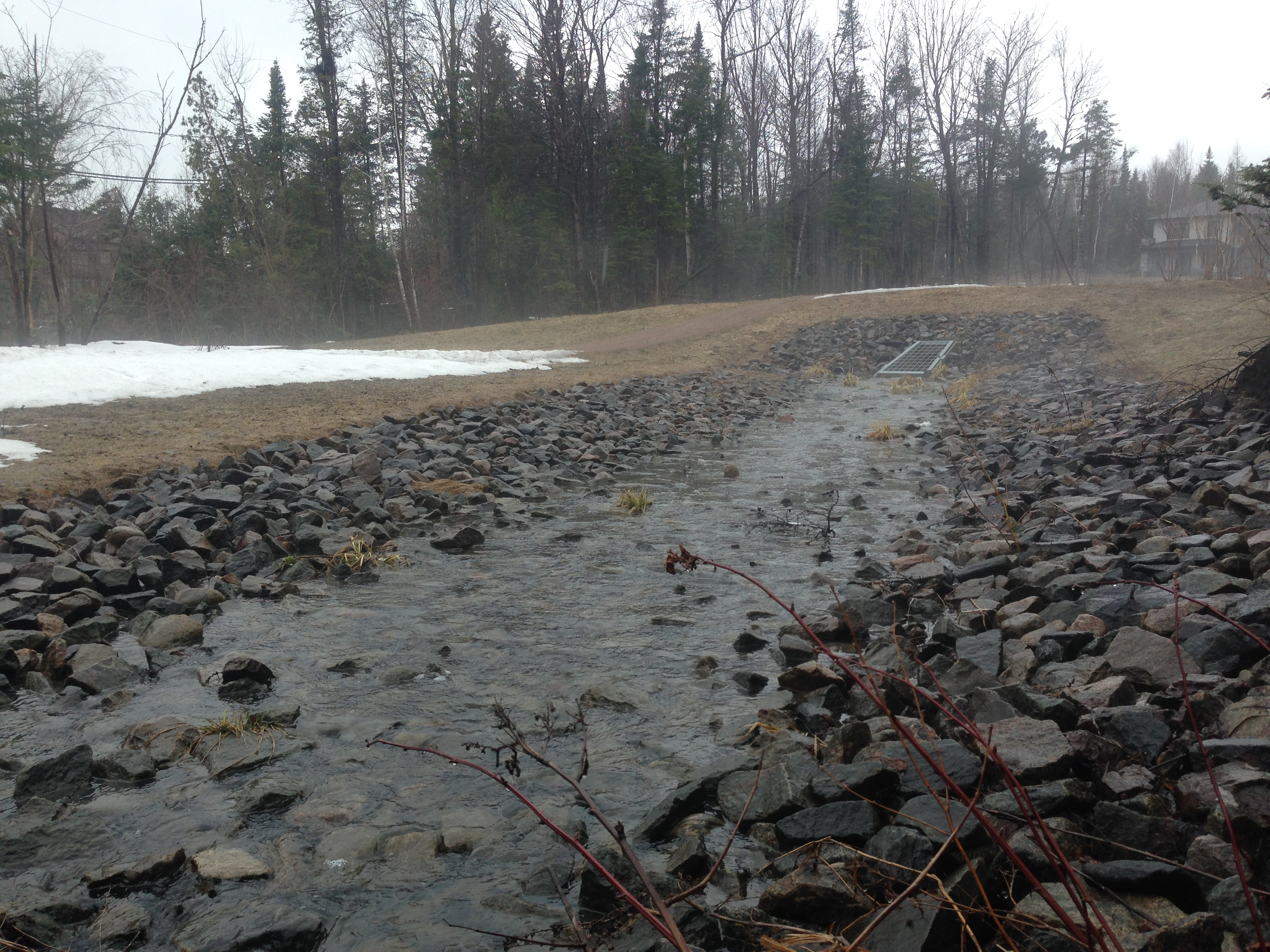
Small tributary

== See also ==
- List of rivers of Quebec
