= Richard Marceau =

Canadian politician (born 1970)

Member of Parliament for Charlesbourg—Haute-Saint-Charles
- In office 1997–2006
- Preceded by: Jean-Marc Jacob
- Succeeded by: Daniel Petit

Personal details
- Born: August 25, 1970 (age 56) Charlesbourg, Quebec City, Canada
- Party: Bloc Québécois
- Spouse: Lori Beckerman (m. 1994; died 2014)
- Children: 2 sons
- Education: Faculté de droit de l'Université Laval; University of Western Ontario Faculty of Law; École nationale d'administration
- Occupation: Lawyer, politician, writer, executive
- Awards: Canadian Jewish Book Award for best memoir (2012)

Richard Marceau (born August 25, 1970) is a Canadian former Bloc Québécois Member of Parliament, who served as an MP for nearly nine years. He is now Vice President, External Affairs and General Counsel for the Centre for Israel and Jewish Affairs. He authored A Quebec Jew: From Bloc Québécois MP to Jewish Activist (2011).

== Early and personal life ==
Marceau was born in Charlesbourg, Quebec City. He is an 11th-generation Quebecker, from a Roman Catholic family, and has four siblings. His father was a civil servant and a practising Catholic, and his mother Michelle was a homemaker. His ancestors arrived from France in the colony of New France (now Quebec) in 1635.

Marceau was educated by priests in Quebec City. He graduated from law schools at Faculté de droit de l'Université Laval and at the University of Western Ontario Faculty of Law. He also studied at the École nationale d'administration in France. He became a lawyer in both Québec and Ontario. Marceau lives in Gatineau, Québec.

Until her death of cancer in 2014, he was married to Lori Beckerman with whom he had two sons.

== Political career ==
Marceau was first elected to the House of Commons of Canada as a Member of Parliament in the 1997 federal election for the Bloc Québécois (which advocates for national independence for the Canadian province of Quebec) in the riding of Charlesbourg at the age of 26. He served in Parliament for the better part of nine years, and was a sovereignist. He was re-elected in the 2000 election in the riding of Charlesbourg—Jacques-Cartier, and again in the 2004 election in the riding of Charlesbourg. Among the bills he sponsored was the Act to establish Holocaust Memorial Day, which received royal assent on November 7, 2003. He served beginning in 2005 as Chair of the Parliament's Subcommittee on the process for appointment to the Federal Judiciary of the Standing Committee on Justice, Human Rights, Public Safety and Emergency Preparedness. He also served as the Bloc's critic to the Solicitor General of Canada, International Trade, Crown–Indigenous Relations and Northern Affairs Canada, Intergovernmental Affairs, and the King's Privy Council for Canada. He was their critic to the Minister of Justice and Attorney General of Canada and the Minister of Public Safety and Emergency Preparedness. He was also the party's spokesperson in English Canada.

He was defeated in the 2006 election by Daniel Petit of the Conservative Party of Canada by under 1,400 votes, 41%-38%. Marceau ran unsuccessfully as the Parti Québécois candidate in Charlesbourg in the 2007 Quebec election.

== Conversion to Judaism ==
Marceau converted to Judaism in 2004, 10 years after his marriage to Lori Beckerman, who had been a fellow law student of his and was Jewish. He said she opened "the door to a people, a nation, a culture and a religion that I grew to love." He converted first to Reform Judaism, but became more observant and later converted as well in an Orthodox Jewish conversion. Regarding his circumcision, Marceau said: "I quickly came to believe that it is better to undergo surgery at eight days old than at 34 years." He had co-chaired the Canada-Israel Inter-Parliamentary Friendship Group and sponsored a bill establishing a national Holocaust remembrance day. He is now fluent in Hebrew. He described himself as a "pro-Palestinian Zionist" in an op-ed piece he wrote for the Ottawa Citizen in 2005.

== The Canada-Israel Committee and the Centre for Israel and Jewish Affairs ==
From 2006 to 2011, Marceau worked for the Canada-Israel Committee. Since 2011, he has worked for the Centre for Israel and Jewish Affairs initially as a senior advisor and senior counsel, and now as Vice President, External Affairs and General Counsel.

== Writing ==
In 2011, Marceau published A Quebec Jew: From Bloc Québécois MP to Jewish Activist, detailing his spiritual journey from a Catholic family to Judaism against the backdrop of Quebec politics. It was published in French and English, and won the 2012 Canadian Jewish Book Award for best memoir.

== See also ==
- List of converts to Judaism
- List of Jewish Canadian politicians

Parliament of Canada
Preceded by Jean-Marc Jacob, Bloc Québécois	Member of Parliament for Charlesbourg; 1997-2006	Succeeded by Daniel Petit, Conservative Party of Canada
