= Jean-Marc Jacob =

Canadian politician

Member of the Canadian Parliament for Charlesbourg
- In office 1993–1997
- Preceded by: Monique Tardif
- Succeeded by: Richard Marceau

Personal details
- Born: 18 February 1947 (age 79) Charlesbourg, Quebec, Canada
- Party: Bloc Québécois

Jean-Marc Jacob (born 18 February 1947) was a member of the House of Commons of Canada from 1993 to 1997. He is a veterinarian by career.

He was elected in the Charlesbourg electoral district under the Bloc Québécois party in the 1993 federal election, thus serving in the 35th Canadian Parliament.

On 28 April 1997, Jacob lost his riding's party nomination in the riding to Richard Marceau for the 1997 federal election after which he left Canadian politics.

== Controversies ==
Jacob faced accusations that he advised Quebec members of the Canadian Forces to join a Quebec army if there was a winning vote for Quebec sovereignty in the 1995 Quebec referendum. The prevailing Liberal government decided to investigate these remarks, while the Reform Party demanded Jacob be charged with sedition. Reaction to this incident included a 22 March 1996 sketch on the English language television comedy series Royal Canadian Air Farce where Jacob "learns the meaning of the word sedition".

For 10 days in November 1996, Jacob was suspended from the Bloc Québécois caucus over comments he made following a failed bid to become mayor of his home community of Charlesbourg.
