= Charlesbourg—Haute-Saint-Charles =

Federal electoral district in Quebec, Canada

Coordinates: 46.900°N 71.307°W

Quebec electoral district
- Interactive map of riding boundaries from the 2025 federal election

Federal electoral district
- Legislature: House of Commons
MP
Pierre Paul-Hus
Conservative
- District created: 1976
- First contested: 1979
- Last contested: 2021
- District webpage: profile, map

Demographics
- Population (2016): 107,254
- Electors (2019): 85,804
- Area (km²): 118
- Pop. density (per km²): 908.9
- Census division: Quebec City
- Census subdivision: Quebec City (part)

Charlesbourg—Haute-Saint-Charles (formerly Charlesbourg and Charlesbourg—Jacques Cartier) is a federal electoral district in Quebec, Canada, that has been represented in the House of Commons of Canada since 1979.

== Geography ==
The riding, in the Quebec region of Capitale-Nationale, consists of the northeast part of Quebec City, including the borough of Charlesbourg and the eastern portion of La Haute-Saint-Charles (Saint-Émile and Lac-Saint-Charles).

The neighbouring ridings are Québec, Louis-Saint-Laurent, Portneuf—Jacques-Cartier, and Beauport—Limoilou.

== Demographics ==
According to the 2011 Canadian census

Ethnic groups: 95.3% White, 2.9% Indigenous, 1.8% Other
Languages: 96.8% French, 1.1% English, 2.1% other
Religions: 88.7% Christian, 0.8% Other, 10.5% none
Median income: $32,861 (2010)
Average income: $36,940 (2010)

== History ==
Charlesbourg was created in 1976 from parts of Portneuf and Montmorency. It was renamed Charlesbourg—Jacques-Cartier in 2000 and abolished in 2003, at which point a new Charlesbourg riding was created. After the federal election in 2004, it was renamed Charlesbourg—Haute-Saint-Charles.

The riding gained a small fraction of territory from Louis-Saint-Laurent from the 2012 electoral redistribution.

Following the 2022 Canadian federal electoral redistribution, the riding gained territory from Louis-Saint-Laurent east of the following line: Boul. Val-Cartier to Rue de la Rivière-Nelson, Rivière Saint-Charles, the eastern limits of the Wendake Indian Reserve, Boul. Bastien, Boul. Pierre-Bertrand, lost the territory east of Ch. de Château-Bigot and Av. du Bourg-Royal and north of Boul. Louis-XIV to Montmorency—Charlevoix, and lost territory to Beauport—Limoilou south of a line that follows Rue de Chamonix, 10e Av. East, and Boul. Louix-XIV, and an additional territory south of a line that follows 41e Rue West, to Boul. Henri-Bourassa to Autoroute 40.

=== Members of Parliament ===
This riding has elected the following members of the House of Commons of Canada:

Parliament	Years	Member	Party
Charlesbourg; Riding created from Portneuf and Montmorency
31st	1979–1980	Pierre Bussières	Liberal
32nd	1980–1984	Pierre Bussières	Liberal
33rd	1984–1988	Monique Tardif	Progressive Conservative
34th	1988–1993	Monique Tardif	Progressive Conservative
35th	1993–1997	Jean-Marc Jacob	Bloc Québécois
36th	1997–2000	Richard Marceau	Bloc Québécois
Charlesbourg—Jacques-Cartier
37th	2000–2004	Richard Marceau	Bloc Québécois
Charlesbourg
38th	2004–2006	Richard Marceau	Bloc Québécois
Charlesbourg—Haute-Saint-Charles
39th	2006–2008	Daniel Petit	Conservative
40th	2008–2011	Daniel Petit	Conservative
41st	2011–2015	Anne-Marie Day	New Democratic
42nd	2015–2019	Pierre Paul-Hus	Conservative
43rd	2019–2021	Pierre Paul-Hus	Conservative
44th	2021–2025	Pierre Paul-Hus	Conservative
45th	2025–present	Pierre Paul-Hus	Conservative

== Election results ==
=== Charlesbourg—Haute-Saint-Charles 2004 - present ===
2025 Canadian federal election
Party	Candidate	Votes	%	±%	Expenditures
Conservative	Pierre Paul-Hus	27,698	42.44	–2.58	
Liberal	Louis Bellemare	22,597	34.62	+14.97	
Bloc Québécois	Bladimir Laborit Infante	12,346	18.92	–5.72	
New Democratic	Dominique Harrisson	1,752	2.68	–3.24	
People's	Paul Cyr	516	0.79	–1.41	
Independent	Danick Bisson	357	0.55	N/A	
Total valid votes/expense limit		65,266	98.58		
Total rejected ballots		937	1.42		
Turnout		66,203	73.15		
Eligible voters (Note: Number of eligible voters does not include election day registrations.)		90,590			
Conservative notional hold		Swing		–8.78	
Source: Elections Canada

2021 federal election redistributed results
Party	Vote	%
Conservative	26,759	45.02
Bloc Québécois	14,642	24.64
Liberal	11,681	19.65
New Democratic	3,516	5.92
People's	1,310	2.20
Green	994	1.67
Others	531	0.89

2021 Canadian federal election
Party	Candidate	Votes	%	±%	Expenditures
Conservative	Pierre Paul-Hus	25,623	44.7	+6.6	$58,750.08
Bloc Québécois	Marie-Christine Lamontagne	14,237	24.8	-2.4	$11,815.04
Liberal	René-Paul Coly	11,326	19.7	-1.6	$29,942.88
New Democratic	Michel Marc Lacroix	3,446	6.0	-1.7	$0.00
People's	Wayne Cyr	1,296	2.3	±0.0	$0.00
Green	Jacques Palardy-Dion	972	1.7	-1.8	$524.90
Free	Daniel Pelletier	449	0.8	N/A	$389.30
Total valid votes/expense limit		57,349	98.1	–	$114,717.37
Total rejected ballots		1,136	1.9		
Turnout		58,485	68.7		
Registered voters		85,183			
Conservative hold		Swing		+4.5	
Source: Elections Canada

2019 Canadian federal election
Party	Candidate	Votes	%	±%	Expenditures
Conservative	Pierre Paul-Hus	22,484	38.05	-4.19	$55,938.52
Bloc Québécois	Alain D'Eer	16,053	27.16	+14.84	none listed
Liberal	René-Paul Coly	12,584	21.29	-1.92	$25,312.84
New Democratic	Guillaume Bourdeau	4,554	7.71	-12.36	none listed
Green	Samuel Moisan-Domm	2,042	3.46	+1.30	$6,186.85
People's	Joey Pronovost	1,379	2.33	-	none listed
Total valid votes/expense limit		59,096	97.91		
Total rejected ballots		1,264	2.09	+0.63	
Turnout		60,360	70.25	+0.55	
Eligible voters		85,926			
Conservative hold		Swing		-9.52	
Source: Elections Canada

2015 Canadian federal election
Party	Candidate	Votes	%	±%	Expenditures
Conservative	Pierre Paul-Hus	24,608	42.24	+11.95	$64,105.10
Liberal	Jean Côté	13,525	23.22	+16.69	$19,339.48
New Democratic	Anne-Marie Day	11,690	20.07	-24.92	$23,012.10
Bloc Québécois	Marc Antoine Turmel	7,177	12.32	-3.96	$16,642.76
Green	Nathalie Baudet	1,256	2.16	+0.6	–
Total valid votes/expense limit		58,256	98.54		$222,590.66
Total rejected ballots		866	1.46	–	
Turnout		59,122	69.69	–	
Eligible voters		84,830			
Conservative gain from New Democratic		Swing		+18.44	
Source: Elections Canada

2011 federal election redistributed results
Party	Vote	%
New Democratic	24,197	44.99
Conservative	16,288	30.29
Bloc Québécois	8,756	16.28
Liberal	3,512	6.53
Green	837	1.56
Others	189	0.35

2011 Canadian federal election
Party	Candidate	Votes	%	±%	Expenditures
New Democratic	Anne-Marie Day	24,131	45.0	+31.9	
Conservative	Daniel Petit	16,220	30.3	-10.8	
Bloc Québécois	Félix Grenier	8,732	16.3	-12.9	
Liberal	Martine Gaudreault	3,505	6.5	-7.6	
Green	Simon Verret	832	1.6	-0.9	
Christian Heritage	Simon Cormier	189	0.4	-	
Total valid votes/expense limit		53,609	100.0		
Total rejected ballots		801	1.5	-0.1	
Turnout		54,410	66.2	+2.5	–
Eligible voters		82,140	–	–	

2008 Canadian federal election
Party	Candidate	Votes	%	±%	Expenditures
Conservative	Daniel Petit	20,566	41.14	+0.1	$40,863
Bloc Québécois	Denis Courteau	14,602	29.21	-9.1	$58,190
Liberal	Denise Legros	7,039	14.08	+5.3	$14,902
New Democratic	Anne-Marie Day	6,542	13.08	+6.9	$3,986
Green	François Bédard	1,231	2.46	-0.1	$0
Total valid votes/expense limit		49,980	100.0	$85,288	
Rejected ballots		811	1.6		
Turnout		50,791	63.66		

2006 Canadian federal election
Party	Candidate	Votes	%	±%	Expenditures
Conservative	Daniel Petit	20,406	41.0	+26.3	$53,716
Bloc Québécois	Richard Marceau	19,034	38.3	-9.8	$63,223
Liberal	Valérie Giguère	4,364	8.8	-15.2	$24,547
New Democratic	Isabelle Martineau	3,084	6.2	+2.9	$0
Independent	Daniel Pelletier	1,567	3.2	–	$2,056
Green	Les Parsons	1,262	2.5	+0.1	$0
Total valid votes/expense limit		49,717	100.0	$78,519	

=== Charlesbourg 2003 - 2004 ===
2004 Canadian federal election
Party	Candidate	Votes	%	±%	Expenditures
Bloc Québécois	Richard Marceau	23,886	48.0	+9.7	$73,605
Liberal	Jean-Marie Laliberté	11,911	24.0	-12.9	$60,346
Conservative	Bertrand Proulx	7,306	14.7	-6.4	$8,784
New Democratic	François Villeneuve	1,623	3.3	+1.5	$2,581
Green	Marilou Moisan-Domm	1,188	2.4	+0.4	
Marijuana	Benjamin Kasapoglu	376	0.8	New	
Total valid votes/expense limit		46,290	98.0	–	$76,602
Total rejected ballots		961	2.0	-1.0	
Turnout		47,251	62.3	-5.8	
Eligible voters		75,827	–	–	
Bloc Québécois hold		Swing		+11.3	
Change from 2000 is based on redistributed results. Conservative Party change is based on the total of Canadian Alliance and Progressive Conservative Party votes.

=== Charlesbourg—Jacques-Cartier 2000 - 2004 ===
2000 Canadian federal election
Party	Candidate	Votes	%
Bloc Québécois	Richard Marceau	21,867	38.3
Liberal	Isabelle Thivierge	21,045	36.9
Alliance	Gérard Latulippe	8,801	15.4
Progressive Conservative	Dann Murray	3,256	5.7
Green	Samuel Moisan-Domm	1,136	2.0
New Democratic	Françoise Dicaire	1,000	1.8
Total valid votes/expense limit		57,105	97.3
Total rejected ballots		1,747	3.0
Turnout		58,852	68.1
Eligible voters		86,361	
Source: Elections Canada

=== Charlesbourg 1979 - 2000 ===
1997 Canadian federal election
Party	Candidate	Votes
Bloc Québécois	Richard Marceau	21,556
Liberal	Jacques Portelance	17,628
Progressive Conservative	Dany Renauld	13,811
Reform	François Ruel	1,135
New Democratic	Jocelyn Tremblay	963
Natural Law	Michel Audy	709
Marxist–Leninist	Claude Moreau	266

1993 Canadian federal election
Party	Candidate	Votes
Bloc Québécois	Jean-Marc Jacob	38,327
Liberal	Michel Renaud	15,084
Progressive Conservative	Monique B. Tardif	8,032
Natural Law	Michel Audy	1,743
New Democratic	Gaston Juneau	1,446
Abolitionist	Nelson Lejeune	323

1988 Canadian federal election
Party	Candidate	Votes
Progressive Conservative	Monique B. Tardif	35,549
Liberal	Paul Vézina	15,727
New Democratic	Denis Courteau	7,914

1984 Canadian federal election
Party	Candidate	Votes
Progressive Conservative	Monique B. Tardif	37,592
Liberal	Pierre Bussieres	22,637
New Democratic	Etienne Tremblay	7,301
Rhinoceros	Jean Vadrouille Frenette	2,557
Parti nationaliste	Jean-Nil Jean	1,088
Social Credit	Robert Robichaud	469
Commonwealth of Canada	Daniel St-Louis	84

1980 Canadian federal election
Party	Candidate	Votes
Liberal	Pierre Bussieres	42,569
New Democratic	Etienne Tremblay	7,388
Progressive Conservative	Henri Casault	4,128
Rhinoceros	Denis Van Bernard	3,066
Social Credit	Claude L'Herault	2,275
Union populaire	Roch Gaudreau	480

1979 Canadian federal election
Party	Candidate	Votes
Liberal	Pierre Bussieres	40,796
Social Credit	Louis Leclerc	10,461
Progressive Conservative	Robert B. Lafreniere	5,860
New Democratic	Jean Bernard Jobin	3,784
Union populaire	Henri Laberge	948

== See also ==
- List of Canadian electoral districts
- Historical federal electoral districts of Canada
