= Lac des Roches =

Lake in Capitale-Nationale, Quebec, Canada

Lake des Roches
- Location within Quebec
- Location: Capitale-Nationale, Quebec, Canada
- Coordinates: 46°55′16″N 71°15′05″W
- Primary inflows: Five small forest and mountain streams.
- Primary outflows: Rivière des Roches
- Basin countries: Canada
- Surface elevation: 295 m (968 ft)
- Settlements: Quebec City

The Lac des Roches (English: lake of rocks) is a freshwater body of the city of Quebec, in the region of the Capitale-Nationale, in the province of Quebec, in Canada.

It is the main reserve of drinking water in the arrondissement of Charlesbourg. Lac des Roches is mainly fed by five forest streams from the surrounding mountains.

The Lake Saint-Charles is served on the east side mainly by the Lac des Roches road and on the south side by the Arthur-Drolet road for the needs of recreational tourism and forestry.

The surface of Lake Saint-Charles is generally frozen from the beginning of December to the end of March; safe circulation on the ice is generally done from the end of December to the beginning of March.

== Description ==
The lake is composed of two shallow basins, surrounded by a mixed forest. A peninsula attached to the north shore stretches for 0.5 kilometres (0.31 mi) to the east in the central part of the lake.

The shore of its eastern portion is mainly occupied by private properties where a dozen chalets are located there, while its western portion is owned by the city. Human activity is prohibited there since the lake is the source supplying the water treatment plant in Charlesbourg. Inaugurated in 2009, it is one of the four water treatment centers in Quebec City.

The mouth of Lac des Roches is located 4.7 kilometres (2.9 mi) northeast of the mouth of the Roches River and 6.6 kilometres (4.1 mi) north of the center of the Charlesbourg area.

== Toponymy ==
The name of the lake appears for the first time on an 1834 map entitled "The Environs of Quebec", compiled by the merchant Alfred Hawkins.

The toponym "Lac des Roches" was formalized on December 5, 1968, at the Commission de toponymie du Québec.

== Gallery ==
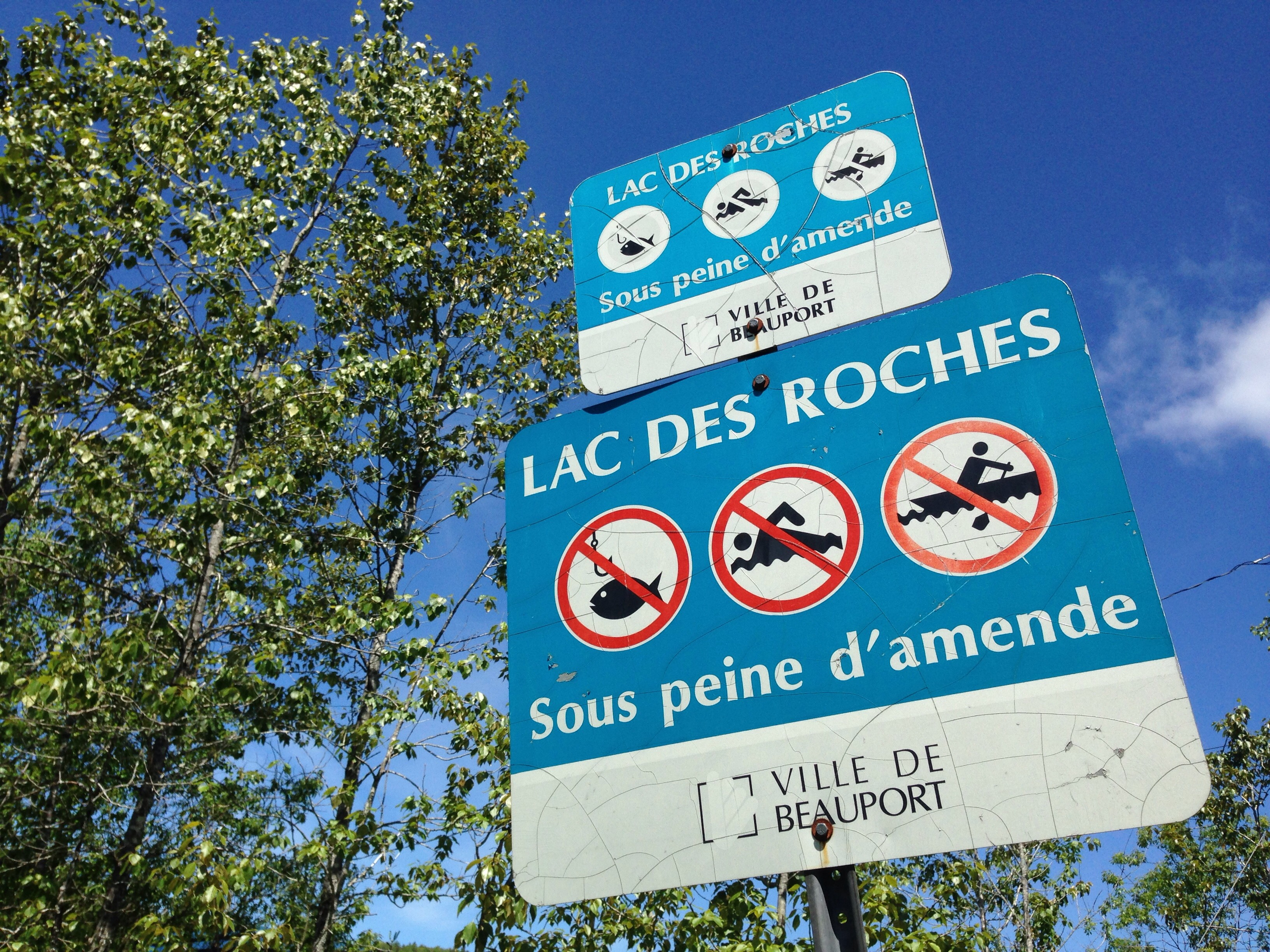
Sign indicating the prohibitions

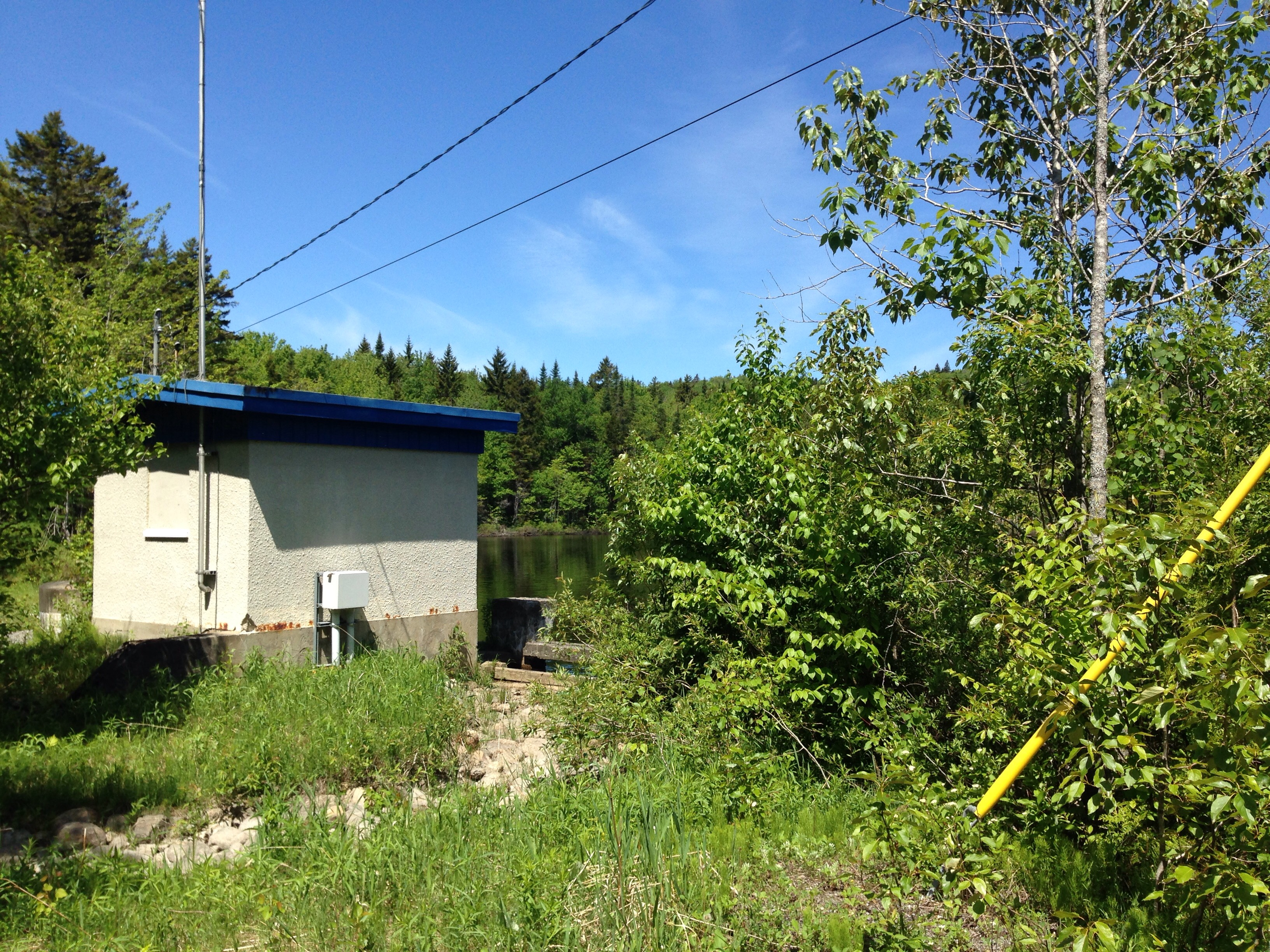
Building at the outlet of the lake

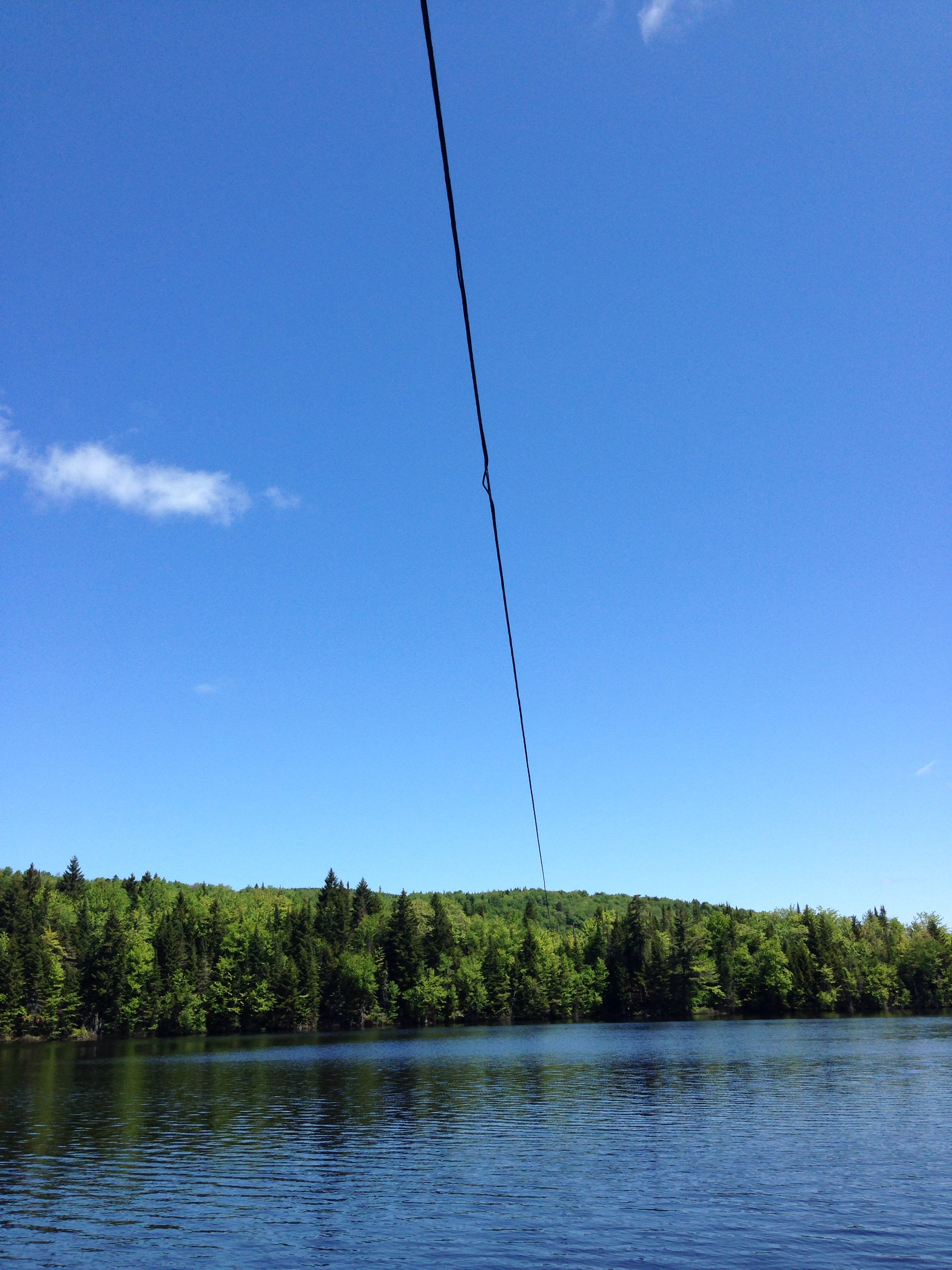
A power line crossing the western basin of the lake

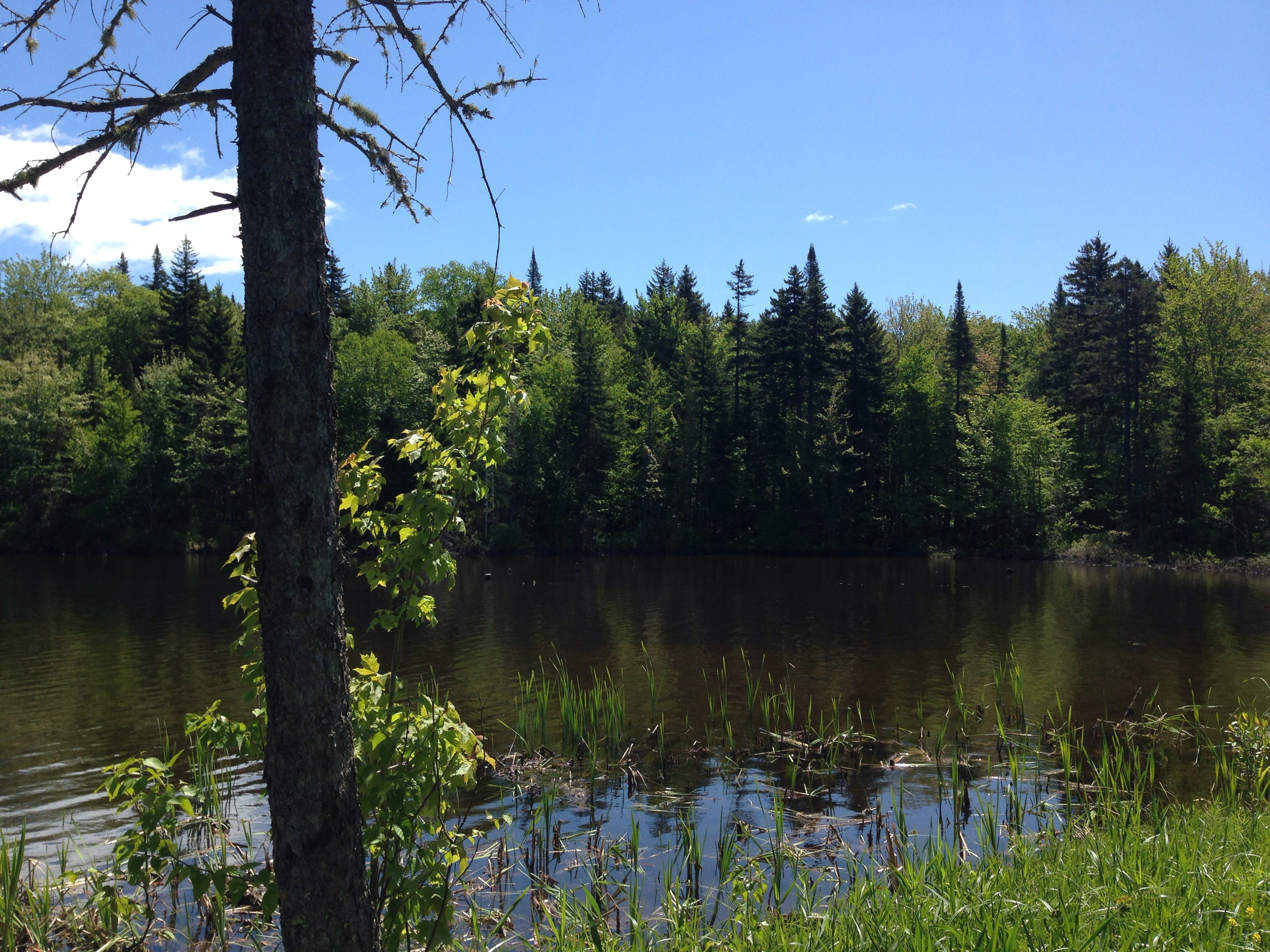
Vegetation

== See also ==
- Rivière du Berger
- Saint-Charles River
