= Pierre Paul-Hus =

Canadian politician

Pierre Paul-Hus MP
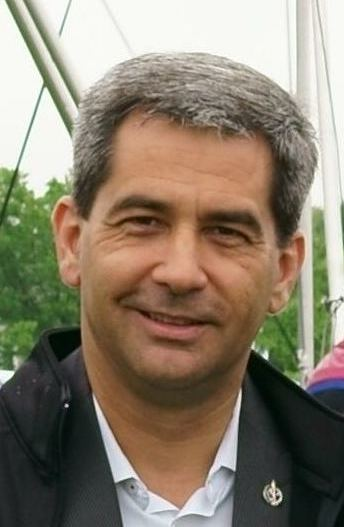
- Paul-Hus in 2017

Quebec lieutenant of the Conservative Party
- Incumbent
- Assumed office September 13, 2022
- Leader: Pierre Poilievre
- Preceded by: Luc Berthold

Member of Parliament for Charlesbourg—Haute-Saint-Charles
- Incumbent
- Assumed office October 19, 2015
- Preceded by: Anne-Marie Day

Personal details
- Born: November 5, 1969 (age 56) Granby, Quebec, Canada
- Party: Conservative
- Education: Canadian Army Command and Staff College; École Militaire de Paris; Université Laval

Military service
- Allegiance: Canada
- Branch/service: Canadian Army
- Years of service: 1987–2009
- Rank: Lieutenant-colonel

Pierre Paul-Hus MP is a Canadian politician, who was elected to represent the riding of Charlesbourg—Haute-Saint-Charles as a member of the Conservative Party in the House of Commons of Canada in the 2015 Canadian federal election.

== Biography ==
Paul-Hus is a graduate of political science at Laval University and owner of PRESTIGE Media Group. He has also been vice president of Sélections Mondiales des Vins Canada (the largest wine competition in North America) for 11 years.

=== Military career ===
Paul-Hus is a military officer (Reserve) and a graduate of the Canadian Army Command and Staff College in Kingston, Ontario and the Ecole Militaire in Paris, where he also taught. In 1987, when Paul-Hus graduated from high school, he enlisted and joined the Régiment de la Chaudière, reserve unit of the Canadian Armed Forces. During the 22 years of his military service, he has conducted two operational missions: one in Goose Bay, Labrador, under the aegis of NATO, and the second in Cyprus to the United Nations. He retired in 2009 at the rank of lieutenant-colonel.

=== Political career ===
In 2011, Paul-Hus finished third for the Conservative Party in Louis-Hébert. He ran again in 2015, in the riding of Charlesbourg—Haute-Saint-Charles and was successful, defeating Incumbent Anne-Marie Day. He is currently serving as the Official Opposition Shadow Minister for Public safety and Emergency preparedness.

==== Committees ====
He is vice-chair of the Standing Committee on Public Safety and National Security. In addition, he is also vice-chairman of the Defense and Security Committee of the NATO Parliamentary Association.

== Electoral record ==
2025 Canadian federal election: Charlesbourg—Haute-Saint-Charles
Party	Candidate	Votes	%	±%	Expenditures
Conservative	Pierre Paul-Hus	27,698	42.44	–2.58	$81,498.60
Liberal	Louis Bellemare	22,597	34.62	+14.97	$10,025.41
Bloc Québécois	Bladimir Laborit Infante	12,346	18.92	–5.72	$9,130.87
New Democratic	Dominique Harrisson	1,752	2.68	–3.24	$0.00
People's	Paul Cyr	516	0.79	–1.41	none listed
Independent	Danick Bisson	357	0.55	N/A	$0.00
Total valid votes/expense limit		65,266	98.58	–	$136,528.69
Total rejected ballots		937	1.42		
Turnout		66,203	73.15		
Eligible voters (Note: Number of eligible voters does not include election day registrations.)		90,590			
Conservative notional hold		Swing		–8.78	
Source: Elections Canada

2021 Canadian federal election: Charlesbourg—Haute-Saint-Charles
Party	Candidate	Votes	%	±%	Expenditures
Conservative	Pierre Paul-Hus	25,623	44.7	+6.6	$58,750.08
Bloc Québécois	Marie-Christine Lamontagne	14,237	24.8	-2.4	$11,815.04
Liberal	René-Paul Coly	11,326	19.7	-1.6	$29,942.88
New Democratic	Michel Marc Lacroix	3,446	6.0	-1.7	$0.00
People's	Wayne Cyr	1,296	2.3	±0.0	$0.00
Green	Jacques Palardy-Dion	972	1.7	-1.8	$524.90
Free	Daniel Pelletier	449	0.8	N/A	$389.30
Total valid votes/expense limit		57,349	98.1	–	$114,717.37
Total rejected ballots		1,136	1.9		
Turnout		58,485	68.7		
Registered voters		85,183			
Conservative hold		Swing		+4.5	
Source: Elections Canada

2019 Canadian federal election: Charlesbourg—Haute-Saint-Charles
Party	Candidate	Votes	%	±%	Expenditures
Conservative	Pierre Paul-Hus	22,484	38.05	-4.19	$55,938.52
Bloc Québécois	Alain D'Eer	16,053	27.16	+14.84	none listed
Liberal	René-Paul Coly	12,584	21.29	-1.92	$25,312.84
New Democratic	Guillaume Bourdeau	4,554	7.71	-12.36	none listed
Green	Samuel Moisan-Domm	2,042	3.46	+1.30	$6,186.85
People's	Joey Pronovost	1,379	2.33	-	none listed
Total valid votes/expense limit		59,096	97.91		
Total rejected ballots		1,264	2.09	+0.63	
Turnout		60,360	70.25	+0.55	
Eligible voters		85,926			
Conservative hold		Swing		-9.52	
Source: Elections Canada

2015 Canadian federal election: Charlesbourg—Haute-Saint-Charles
Party	Candidate	Votes	%	±%	Expenditures
Conservative	Pierre Paul-Hus	24,608	42.24	+11.95	–
Liberal	Jean Côté	13,525	23.22	+16.69	–
New Democratic	Anne-Marie Day	11,690	20.07	-24.92	–
Bloc Québécois	Marc-Antoine Turmel	7,177	12.32	-3.96	–
Green	Nathalie Baudet	1,256	2.16	+0.6	–
Total valid votes/Expense limit		58,256	100.0		$221,301.50
Total rejected ballots		866	–	–	
Turnout		59,122	–	–	
Eligible voters		83,648			
Conservative gain from New Democratic		Swing		+18.44	
Source: Elections Canada

2011 Canadian federal election: Louis-Hébert
Party	Candidate	Votes	%	±%	Expenditures
New Democratic	Denis Blanchette	23,373	38.65	+29.32	
Bloc Québécois	Pascal-Pierre Paillé	14,640	24.21	-12.02	
Conservative	Pierre Paul-Hus	13,207	21.84	-6.37	
Liberal	Jean Beaupré	8,110	13.41	-10.18	
Green	Michelle Fontaine	996	1.65	-0.78	
Christian Heritage	Marie-Claude Bouffard	143	0.24	+0.03	
Total valid votes/Expense limit		60,469	100.00		
Total rejected ballots		636	1.04		
Turnout		61,105	73.73		
