= Rivière du Berger =

Tributary of Saint-Charles River in Québec, Canada

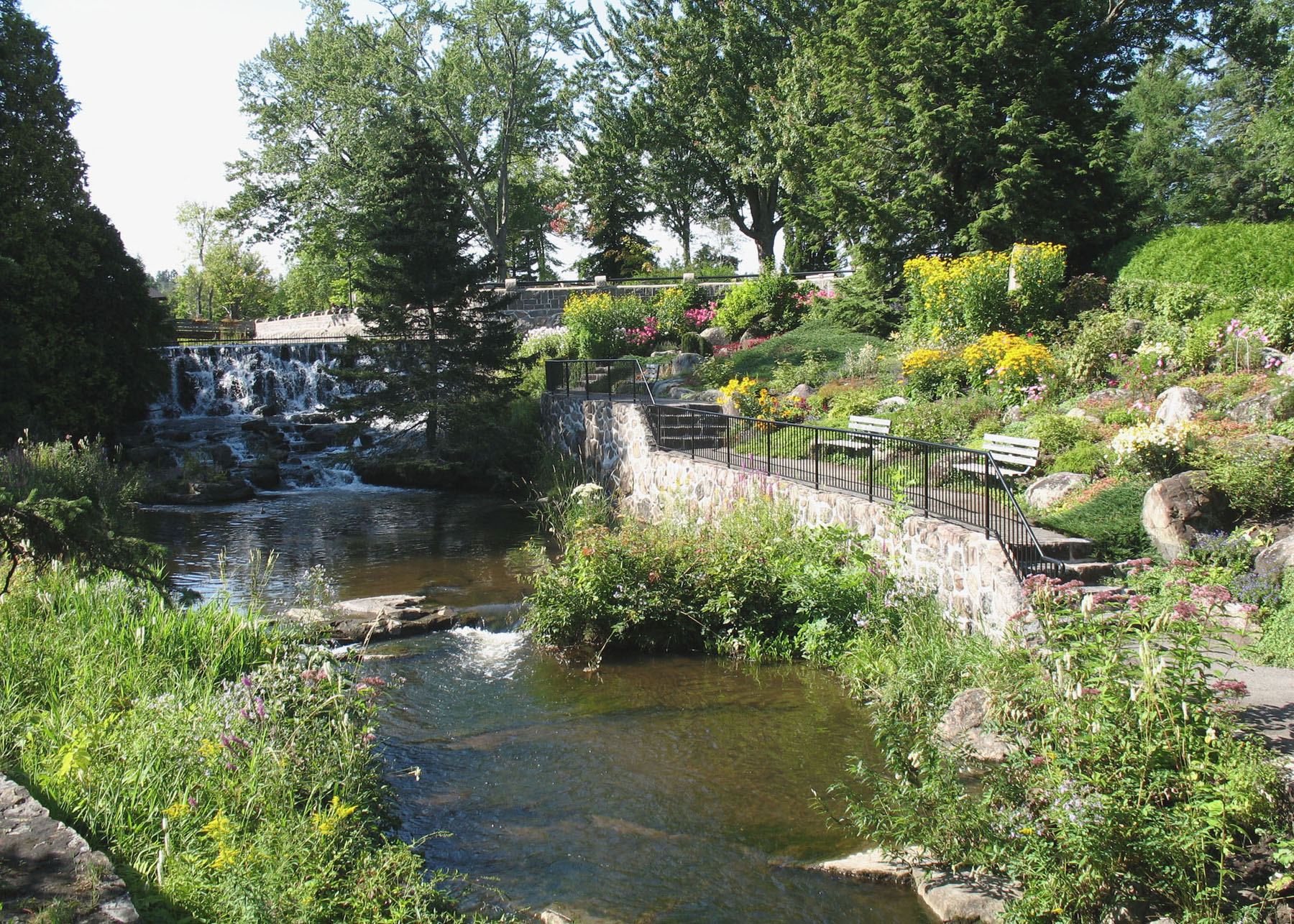

- Location within Quebec

Location
- Country: Canada
- Province: Quebec
- Region: Capitale-Nationale
- Regional County Municipality: Quebec (city)

Physical characteristics
- Source: Little unidentified lake
  - location: Quebec (city)
  - coordinates: 46°55′22″N 71°18′03″W
  - elevation: 179
- Mouth: Rivière du Berger
  - location: Quebec (city)
  - coordinates: 46°48′37″N 71°17′56″W
  - elevation: 10 m
- Length: 18.4 km (11.4 mi)

Basin features
- Tributaries
  - left: (Upward from the mouth) unidentified stream, Carrières stream, unidentified stream, unidentified stream, unidentified stream, rivière des Roches, rivière des Sept Ponts;
  - right: (Upward from the mouth) unidentified stream, unidentified stream, unidentified stream.

The Rivière du Berger is a tributary of the Saint-Charles River located in Quebec, in the administrative region of Capitale-Nationale, in the province of Quebec, in Canada. It is 18.4 km long.

The Berger river valley is served (from upstream to downstream) by boulevard Central, boulevard Lebourgneuf, rue de la Rive Boisée Nord, boulevard Robert-Bourassa, avenue Chauveau, boulevard Bastien, rue Élisabeth-II, rue du Pomerol, rue de Jurançon, rue du Daim and rue Saint-Alexandre.

The surface of the Berger River (except the rapids areas) is generally frozen from the beginning of December to the end of March; however, safe circulation on the ice is generally done from the end of December to the beginning of March. The water level of the river varies with the seasons and the precipitation; the spring flood occurs in March or April.

== Geography ==
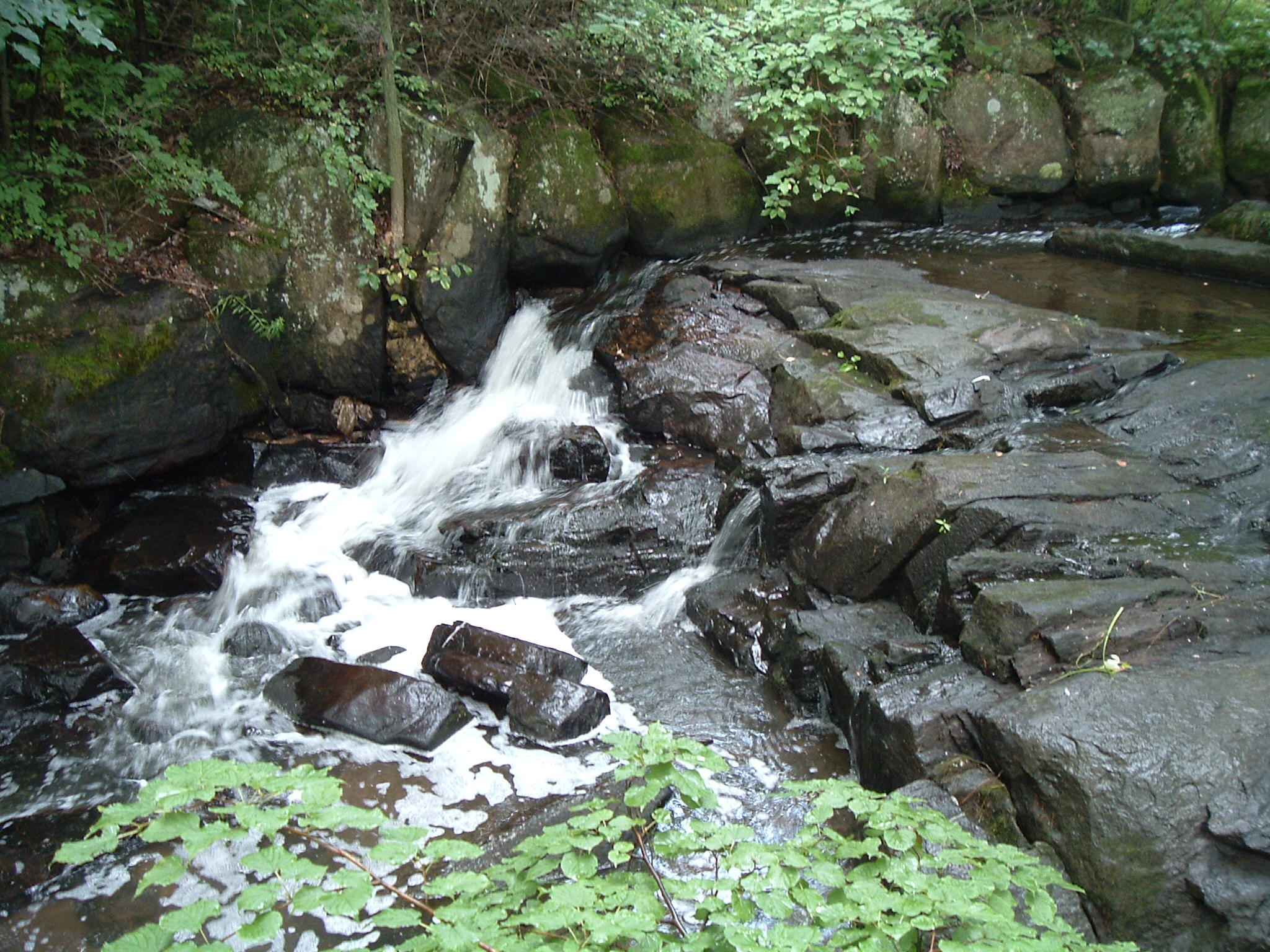
The Berger River in Moulins Park, Quebec

The Berger River watershed, which covers 53 km^{2}, is located in the southeast sector of the Saint-Charles River watershed. It crosses, from upstream to downstream, the foothills of the Canadian Shield and the St. Lawrence Lowlands.

The river takes its source from a small unidentified lake in a wooded area of Notre-Dame-des-Laurentides. The main tributaries of the Berger River are the rivière des Sept Ponts, the Commissaires stream, the Carrières stream and the rivière des Roches. The southern part of the Berger river basin is relatively urbanized, but the density decreases towards the north. Apart from a low density area upstream from the site of the former zoological garden, the northern part is very little developed. There is a large wooded area that houses the Lac des Roches, used as a reserve of drinking water by the borough of Charlesbourg.

From the mouth of an unidentified small lake, the Berger river flows over 18.4 kilometres (11.4 mi), with a drop of 169 metres (554 ft), according to the following segments:

- 1.3 kilometres (0.81 mi) in a southerly direction, gradually bending towards the south-east when entering an urban area, up to the outlet of the rivière des Sept Ponts (coming from the north);
- 2.1 kilometres (1.3 mi) to the south, crossing the Parc des Moulins (where the Orsainville zoo is located), to the confluence of the rivière des Roches (coming from the north);
- 0.5 kilometres (0.31 mi) southwards in urban areas, up to the discharge of an urban stream (coming from the north);
- 1.1 kilometres (0.68 mi) south-east at the limit of the residential construction of Orsainville, up to a bend of the river corresponding to a small stream (coming from ballast);
- 1.6 kilometres (0.99 mi) to the southwest in the green zone by crossing the autoroute 73 and collecting an unidentified stream (coming from the north), up to a river bend;
- 5.7 kilometres (3.5 mi) to the southwest by collecting a stream (coming from the northwest), bending towards the south, by collecting a stream (coming from the west), crossing a long area rapids in the Neufchâtel sector, bending south-east while winding in places, to route 369;
- 2.8 kilometres (1.7 mi) towards the south-east, meandering through the Parc de l'Escarpement and the Métrobec industrial park, to autoroute 40;
- 3.3 kilometres (2.1 mi) towards the south-east in the Duberger sector, forming a loop towards the west, then curving towards the south-west, up to the confluence with the Berger river.

The Berger River flows into a river curve on the north bank of the Saint-Charles River. From this confluence, the current descends on 8.3 kilometres (5.2 mi) generally towards the northeast in urban areas, following the course of the Saint-Charles River.

== History ==
The river takes its current name from New France. On a map published in 1688 by Robert de Villeneuve, the toponym “Rivière du Berger” appears clearly. Until the 1960s, the lit) of the river remained practically intact and its surroundings were not urbanized.

In 1973, during the construction of autoroute 740 (autoroute Robert-Bourassa), we were able to witness the turnaround of the Berger River over long distances.

== Toponymy ==
The toponym "Rivière du Berger" is linked to the Du Berger sector that the last segment of the Berge river crosses.

The toponym "Rivière du Berger" was formalized on December 5, 1968, at the Commission de toponymie du Québec.

== Pollution and protection ==
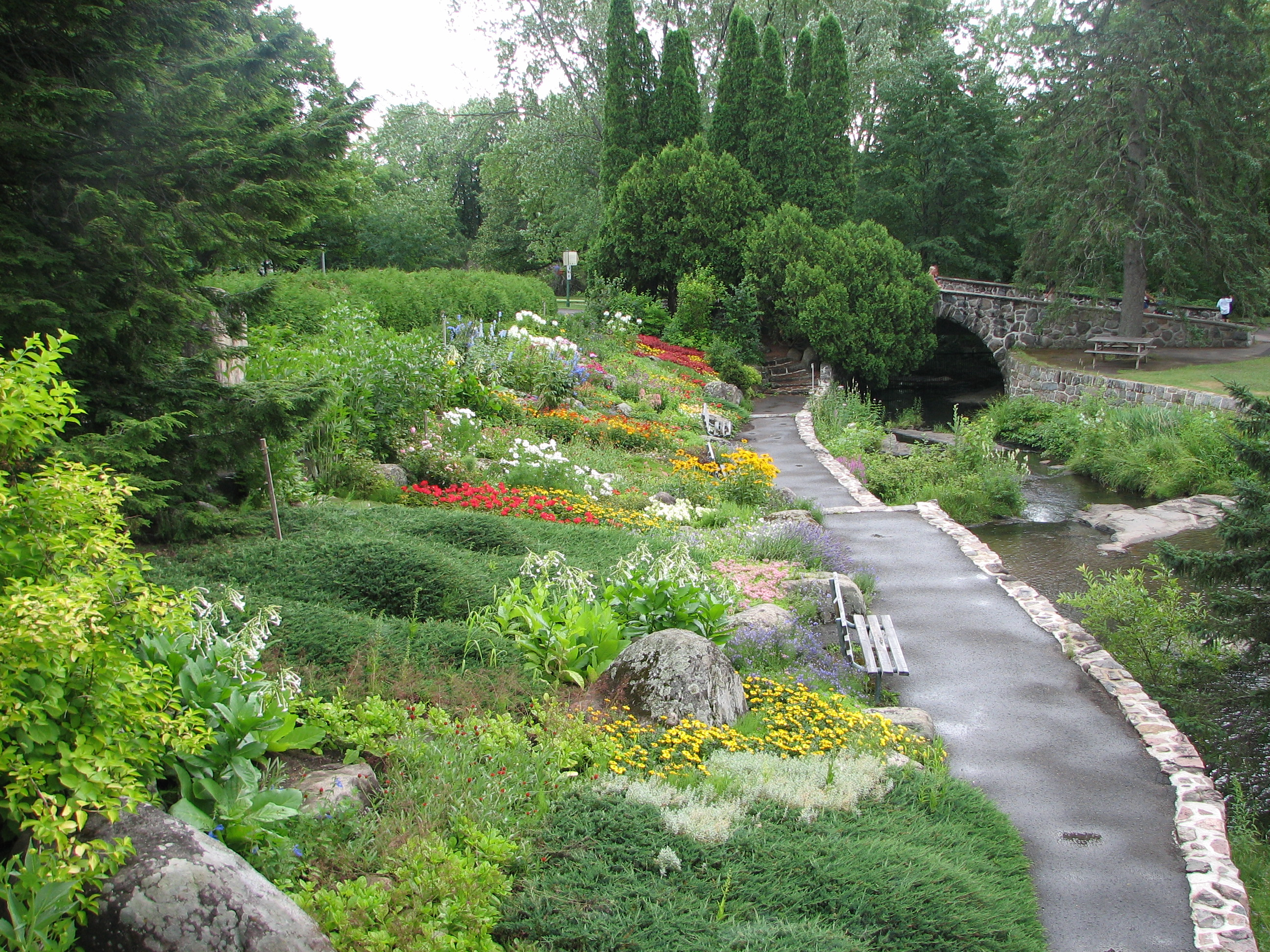
The Berger river in the "garden of the river", then at Zoological garden of Quebec in 2005.

The sources of water pollution are mainly urban. At the mouth of the Berger River, poor quality water is observed: bacteriological contamination is high there and it regularly exceeds the quality criteria for phosphorus, aluminum and organic matter concentrations. However, the quality of the water upstream is far from being as bad as at the mouth: the general water quality index is greater than 80 (good quality generally allowing all uses including swimming) while it can drop to 20 at the mouth (poor quality, most uses may be compromised). However, a point zone of bacteriological contamination was observed at the site of the former zoological garden due to the presence of aquatic birds in the river. The results of recent inventories of fish populations show that the populations of brook trout upstream of the site of the former zoological garden of Quebec are allopatric while they are sympatric downstream.

Part of the river banks is protected by the Saint-Charles and Berger rivers linear park.

== See also ==
- List of rivers of Quebec
