= Charlesbourg, Quebec City =

Coordinates: 46.867°N 71.267°W

Charlesbourg
- Borough of Quebec City
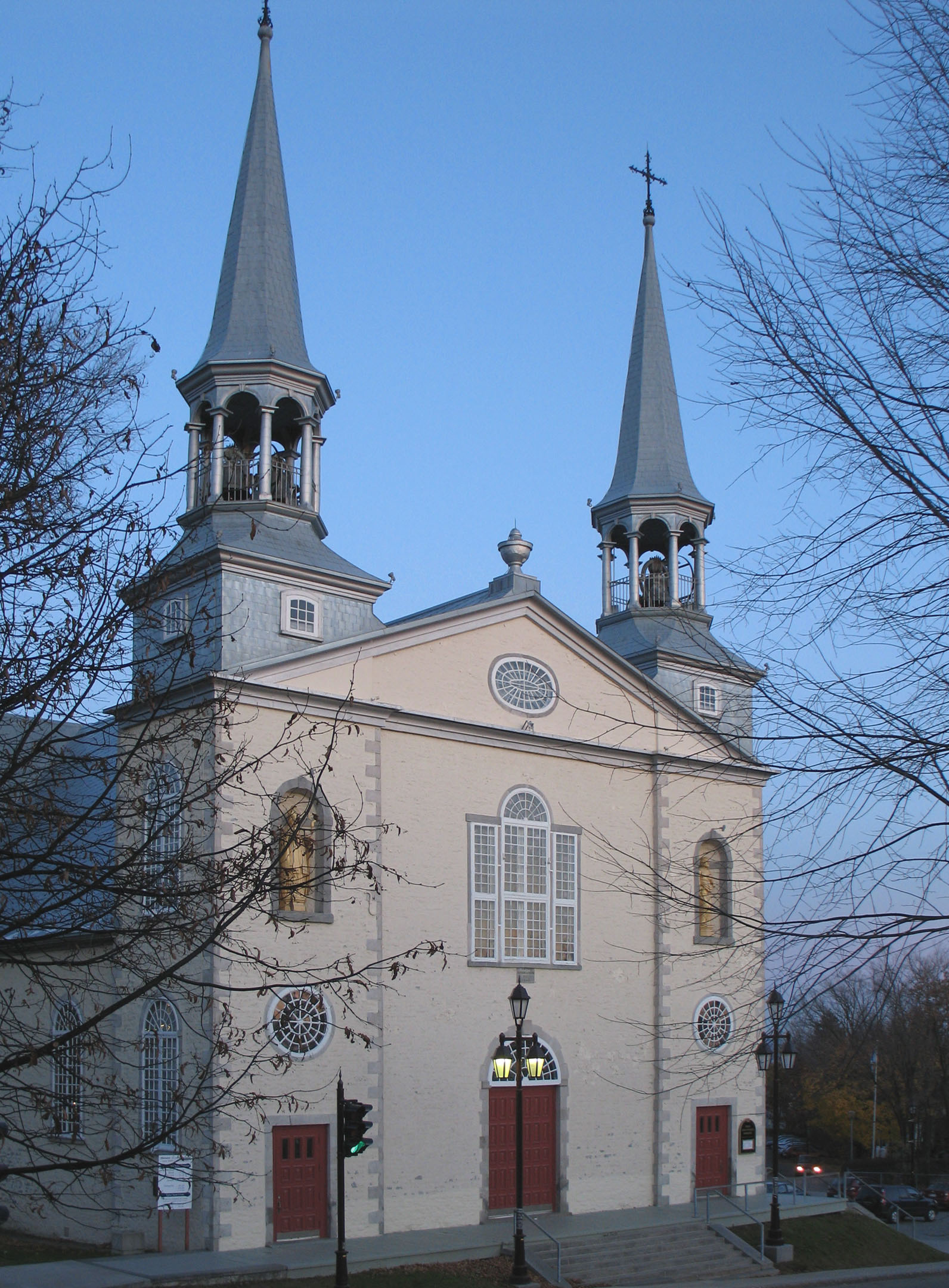
- Motto: "Fide Et Labore Valebo" (Latin) "My worthiness stems from my faith and labour"
- Interactive map of Charlesbourg
- Country: Canada
- Province: Quebec
- Metropolitan Community: Québec
- Established: 1 January 2002

Government
  - Type: Borough
  - Mayor: Vincent Dufresne (2013-2017)

Area
  - Total: 66.43 km^{2} (25.65 sq mi)

Population (2006)^{[1]}
  - Total: 72,810
- Time zone: UTC-5 (EST)
  - Summer (DST): UTC-4 (EDT)

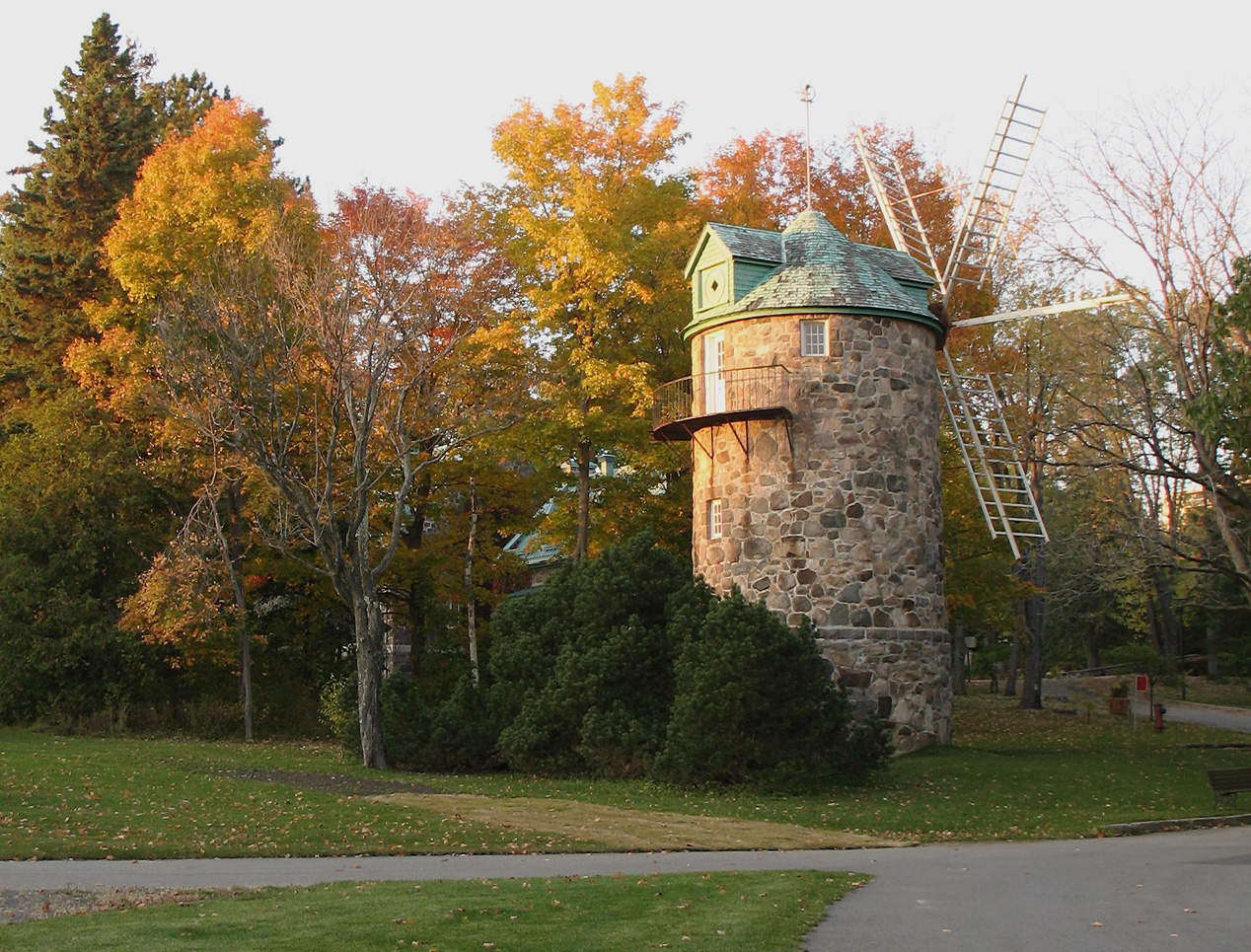
Zoological Gardens

Charlesbourg (French pronunciation: [ʃaʁləbuʁ]) is a borough of Quebec City, in the northeastern part of the city, west of the borough of Beauport.

== History ==
The origins of Charlesbourg began with the concession of the seigniory of Notre-Dame-des-Anges in 1626. The seigniory extended from the Charles River northward, encompassing the modern boroughs of Limoilou and Charlesbourg. In 1665, the new Intendant of Justice, Jean Talon, set out to establish three new villages further north on the plateau. That caused friction with the Jesuits who were the seignors of the area.

The first of the villages consisted of a 25-arpent square, in which a five-arpent square (the "trait carré") was reserved for the church, presbytery and cemetery. The homes of the settlers located on the periphery of the Trait Carré and their trapezoidal plots of land form a star shape. The second village, which is semicircular due to lack of space, was established just to the south at Petite-Auvergne and the third was established in 1667 in Bourg-Royal, to the northeast. This particular arrangement is still visible from the air and is the hallmark of Charlesbourg.

Charlesbourg is, first and foremost, an agricultural area, in addition to becoming a vacation destination for inhabitants of Quebec City in the first half of the 20th century. It became urbanized in the second half of the 20th century and became a suburb of Quebec City. In 1976, the municipalities of Charlesbourg-Est, Notre-Dame-des-Laurentides, Orsainville and the city of Charlesbourg were merged into the city of Charlesbourg. In 2002, Charlesbourg was in turn merged with other municipalities in Quebec City to form a new, large city. Charlesbourg became one of the boroughs of Quebec City.

Charlesbourg's earlier name was Bourg Royal, but it was changed in honour of Charles Borromeo, its patron saint. This Catholic saint was a leading figure of the Counter-Reformation combat against the Protestant Reformation.

An 18th-century British map depicts the place name Charlebourg.

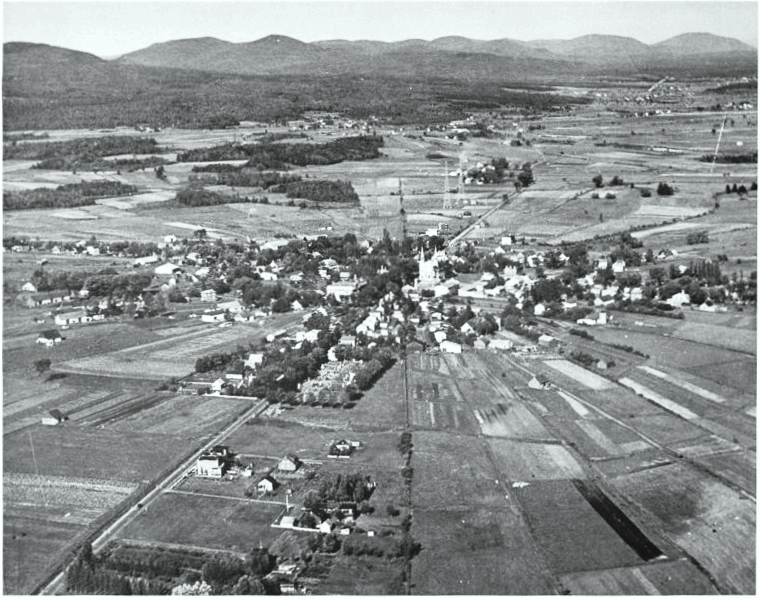
The Trait-Carré,
Aerial View in 1937

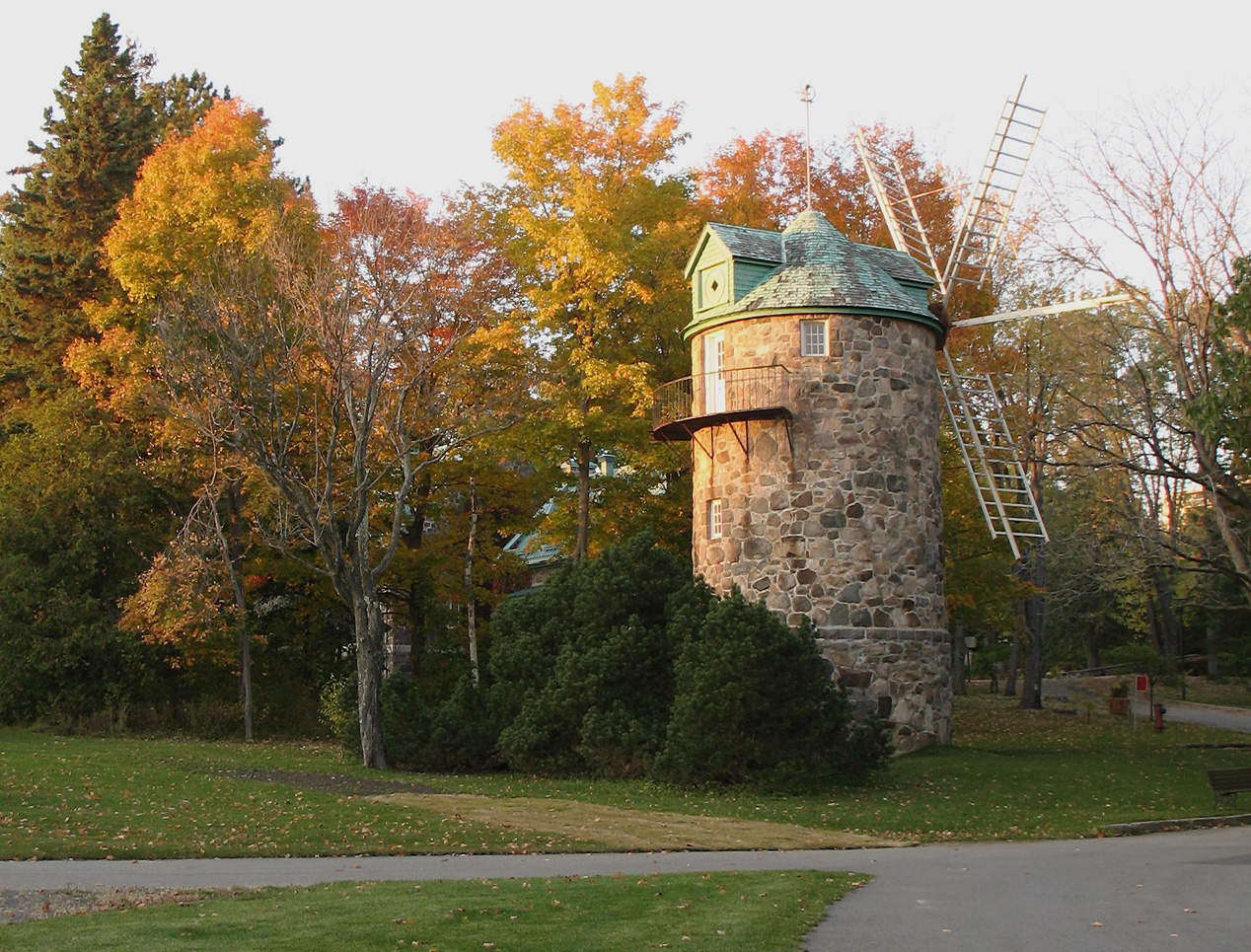
Parc des Moulins

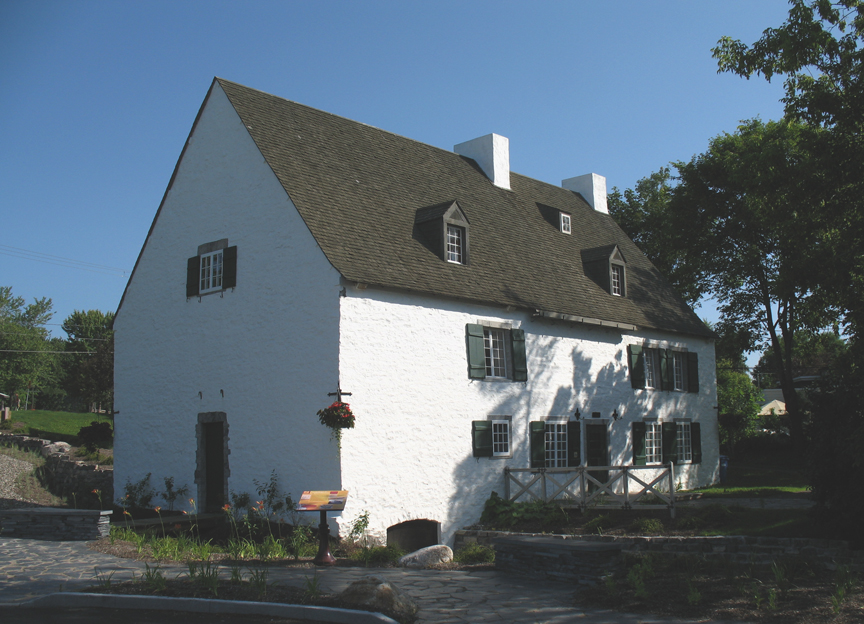
Moulin des Jésuites

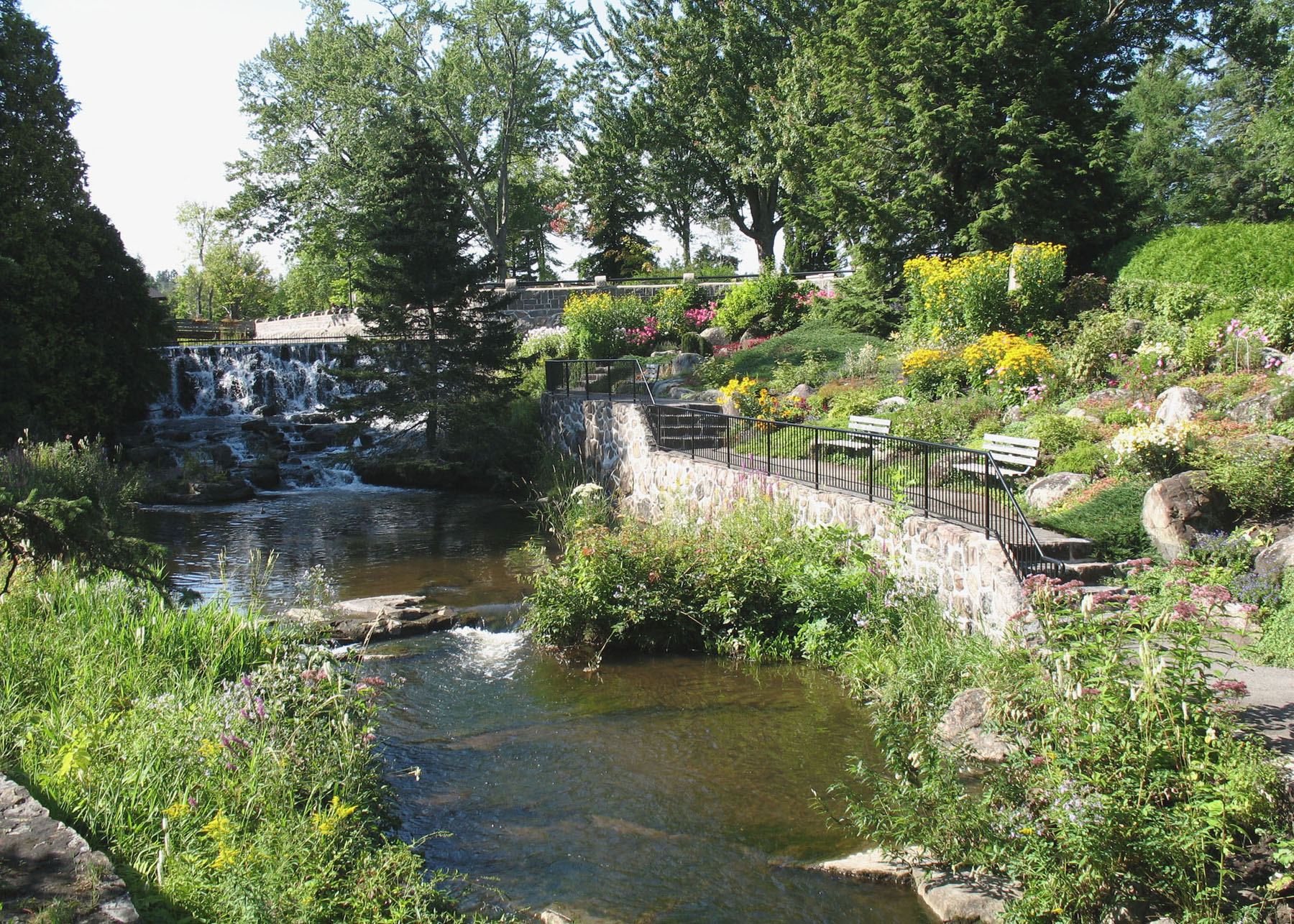
Parc des Moulins
and the Rivière du Berger

== Territory ==
The territory of the borough is divided in six quarters, only two of which have official names: Notre-Dame-des-Laurentides and Des Jésuites. The borough is also equally divided into five electoral districts for municipal elections. The quarters and districts do not correspond, unlike for other boroughs such as Beauport.

The other four quarters have numeric identifiers and will receive official names when neighborhood councils are formed and names are adopted.

=== Quarters ===
- Notre-Dame-des-Laurentides
- Des Jésuites
- Orsainville, officially "Quarter 4-2"

Corresponds to the former city of Orsainville.

- Bourg-Royal, officially "Quarter 4-3"

Corresponds to the former municipality of Charlesbourg-Est.

- Trait-Carré, officially "Quarter 4-5"

Includes the portion of the borough located west of Henri-Bourassa Boulevard, between the Corridor des Cheminots to the south and Jean-Talon Boulevard to the North. In particular, the historic borough of Charlesbourg - the Trait-Carré - with the Church of Saint-Charles-Borromée, listed as an historic monument in 1959, as well as the Magella-Paradis House and the Moulin des Jesuites.

- Saint-Rodrigue, officially "Quarter 4-6"

Corresponds to the former parish of Saint-Rodrigue. It is bounded on the NNW by the Corridor des Cheminots, a cycle track located partly on an old railway track. It is a residential service area. The La Fourmilière Primary School dates back to the 1940s and the Catholic church dates to 1962. The "Les Galeries Charlebourg" shopping center and Loblaws supermarket were built on the site of an important fur trading post. The area is also home to the offices of the Quebec Ministry of Natural Resources.

== Demographics ==
This residential suburb of Quebec City is the fourth-largest urban centre of the Québec Urban Community. Like Beauport, it has increased by more than 20,000 people over the last 25 years.

According to the Canada 2006 Census:

- Population: 72,814
- % Change (2001-2006): +3.6
- Dwellings: 33,497
- Area (km²): 66.29
- Density (persons per km²): 1,098.4

== Notable residents ==
- Félix Asselin
- Steve Barakatt, composer & pianist.
- Alexandre Barrette
- Pierre-Stanislas Bédard
- Gaétan Boucher, Olympic gold medalist speed skater.
- Marc Chouinard, former NHL hockey player.
- Jean-Philippe Côté
- Noël Dorion
- Jérémy Gabriel, singer.
- Nathalie Giguère
- Jean-Marc Jacob
- Jorane
- Richard Marceau
- Pierre Martel
- Jacques Normand
- Bruno Pelletier, singer and actor.
- Hélène Pelletier
- Pascale Picard
- Manon Rhéaume
- Pascal Rhéaume
- Catherine Roberge
- Andrée Watters, singer.

== See also ==
- List of former cities in Quebec
- Municipal reorganization in Quebec
- "The Trait-Carré of Charlesbourg - The Only Star-Shaped Village in Canada!" - Online Exhibition of the Virtual Museum of Canada
